= List of Norwegian films of the 2000s =

Films produced in Norway in the 2000s:

Title	Director	Cast	Genre	Notes
2000
80 grader aust for Birdland	Sølvi A. Lindseth			
Aberdeen	Hans Petter Moland	Lena Heady, Stellan Skarsgård, Ian Hart	Drama	Co-produced with UK and Sweden
Cool and Crazy	Knut Erik Jensen		Documentary	
Detector	Pål Jackman	Mads Ousdal, Kristoffer Joner, Harald Eia	Drama / comedy	Entered into the 23rd Moscow International Film Festival
Get Ready to be Boyzvoiced	Espen Eckbo, Henrik Elvestad and Mathis Fürst	Espen Eckbo, Henrik Elvestad, Linn Skåber, Atle Antonsen, Trond-Viggo Torgersen	Mockumentary	It has been screened multiple times on Australian television channel SBS.
Odd Little Man / When I Hit Jesus... with a Slingshot	Stein Leikanger	Fredrik Stenberg Ditlev-Simonsen, Frederick Paasche, Otto Jespersen	Comedy / family	Based on the biographic memoirs of Odd Børretzen; The Norwegian entry to the Academy Award for Best Foreign Language Film in 2001.
2001
Aria	Pjotr Sapegin		Animated short	Canadian-Norwegian coproduction
Elling	Petter Næss	Sven Nordin		Nominated for Academy Award for Best Foreign Language Film
You Really Got Me	Pål Sletaune	Robert Skjærstad	Comedy	Original title: Amatørene
2002
All About my Father	Even Benestad		Documentary	Winner of the "Best Film" award at the Amanda awards in 2002.
Coastal Life	Øyvind Sandberg		Documentary	
Hold my Heart	Trygve Allister Diesen	Jørgen Langhelle		The Norwegian entry to the Academy Award for Best Foreign Language Film in 2003.
I Am Dina	Ole Bornedal	Gérard Depardieu, Maria Bonnevie, Christopher Eccleston, Bjørn Floberg, Mads Mikkelsen, Wenche Foss	Period drama	The most expensive Norwegian movie to date, with a budget of 144 million NOK ($21 million).; Despite the story being set in northern Norway, and most characters played by Norwegian actors, the dialogue is in English.
2003
Buddy	Morten Tyldum	Aksel Hennie, Nicolai Cleve Broch, Pia Tjelta		Winner of the "Best Film" award at the Amanda awards in 2004.
Burned Negro	Erik Smith Meyer		Comedy / horror	Banned in Australia
Jonny Vang	Jens Lien			
Kitchen Stories	Bent Hamer		Drama / comedy	Winner of the "Best Film" award at the Amanda awards in 2003.
Mother's Elling	Eva Isaksen	Per Christian Ellefsen	Drama	Prequel to Elling
Olsenbanden Jr. går under vann	Arne Lindtner Næss			First feature film of the Olsenbanden Jr. franchise, a spin-off of the Olsenbanden film series.
The Woman of My Life	Alexander Eik	Ane Dahl Torp		
2004
The Crossing	Martin Asphaug	Trond Fausa Aurvåg	Thriller	
Asfaltevangeliet	David Åleskjær	Tommy Karlsen, Per Christian Ellefsen, Brit Elisabeth Haagensli, Helene Rask, Bjørn Sundquist, Sverre Anker Ousdal	Drama	
The Color of Milk	Torun Lian	Andrine Sæther, Ane Dahl Torp	Comedy / romance	
Hawaii, Oslo	Erik Poppe			The Norwegian entry to the Academy Award for Best Foreign Language Film; Winner of the "Best Film" award at the Amanda awards in 2005.; Was nominated for the 2005 Nordic Council Film Prize.
Just Bea	Petter Næss			
Monsterthursday	Arild Østin Ommundsen	Kim Bodnia	Drama / romance	Sequel to Mongoland
Olsenbanden Jr. På Rocker'n	Arne Lindtner Næss			
This is the Song you Need	Tore Rygh	Morten Abel, Kristoffer Joner	Comedy	
Through My Thick Glasses (Gjennom mine tykke briller)	Pjotr Sapegin	Odd Børretzen, Sossen Krohg	Animated short	Canadian-Norwegian coproduction
Ungdommens råskap	Margreth Olin		Documentary	
Uno	Aksel Hennie	Aksel Hennie, Nicolai Cleve Broch, Bjørn Floberg		
2005
37½	Vibeke Idsøe	Helen Vikstvedt, Ulrikke Hansen Døvigen, Anne Ryg, Kåre Conradi, Pia Tjelta	Comedy	
Elsk meg i morgen	Petter Næss	Per Christian Ellefsen	Drama	Sequel to Elling
Factotum	Bent Hamer	Matt Dillon, Lili Taylor, Marisa Tomei	Drama / comedy	Principally a Norwegian production, but with an American cast and about an American author.
The Giant (Norwegian Documentary)	Hallvard Bræin	Erik Bye	Documentary	
Import-Export	Khalid Hussain	Asia Begum, Niklas Gundersen, Iram Haq	Comedy	
Izzat	Ulrik Imtiaz Rolfsen	Emil Marwa	Action / mafia	
Kissed by Winter	Sara Johnsen	Kristoffer Joner	Drama	The Norwegian entry to the Academy Award for Best Foreign Language Film; Was nominated for the 2005 Nordic Council Film Prize.
Naboer	Pål Sletaune	Kristoffer Joner, Cecilie Mosli, Julia Schacht, Anna Bache-Wiig	Thriller	Second Norwegian movie ever to receive an over-18 rating.
Pitbullterje	Arild Fröhlich	Atle Antonsen	Drama / comedy	
2006
The Art of Negative Thinking	Bård Breien	Trond Fausa Aurvåg, Petronella Barker, Birgitte Larsen	Black comedy	Beien won a Crystal Globe award as best director for the film at the Karlovy Vary International Film Festival in the Czech Republic.
The Bothersome Man	Jens Lien	Marian Saastad Ottesen, Fridjov Såheim, Kirsti Eline Torhau	Drama / comedy	
Free Jimmy	Christopher Nielsen		Animation / comedy	Norway's first computer animated feature film; Winner of the "Best Film" award at the Amanda awards in 2006.
Cold Prey	Roar Uthaug	Ingrid Bolsø Berdal, Rune Melby	Horror	
Comrade Pedersen	Hans Petter Moland	Kristoffer Joner, Ane Dahl Torp	Drama	
Olsenbanden Jr. på Cirkus	Arne Lindtner Næss		Comedy / family	
Long Flat Balls	Bjørn Fast Nagell, Harald Zwart			
Reprise	Joachim Trier			The Norwegian entry to the Academy Award for Best Foreign Language Film; Was nominated for the 2007 Nordic Council Film Prize.
Sons	Erik Richter Strand	Nils Jørgen Kaalstad, Mikkel Bratt Silset, Henrik Mestad, Edward Schultheiss, Ingrid Bolsø Berdal	Drama / thriller	Was nominated for the 2007 Nordic Council Film Prize.
Uro	Stefan Faldbakken	Nicolai Cleve Broch, Ane Dahl Torp	Crime / drama	Screened at the 2006 Cannes Film Festival
2007
Bitter Flowers	Ulrik Imtiaz Rolfsen	Trond Espen Seim, Bjørn Floberg	Thriller / crime	First film in the Varg Veum series, based on the Gunnar Staalesen novels.
Elias and the Royal Yacht	Espen Fyksen		Animation / family	
Gone with the Woman	Petter Næss	Trond Fausa Aurvåg, Marian Saastad Ottesen, Peter Stormare	Drama / comedy	The Norwegian entry to the Academy Award for Best Foreign Language Film
Hearts (Norwegian Documentary)	Øyvind Sandberg		Documentary	
Kill Buljo	Tommy Wirkola		Action / comedy	Spoof of the Kill Bill-movies, set in Sami territory.
Mars & Venus	Eva F. Dahr	Pia Tjelta	Drama / comedy	
Mirush	Marius Holst	Enrico Lo Verso	Drama	
Natural Born Star	Even Benestad	Fred Robsahm	Documentary	
O' Horten	Bent Hamer	Bård Owe, Espen Skjønberg, Ghita Nørby, Henny Moan	Drama	Chosen for Un Certain Regard at the Cannes Film Festival.; Skjonberg was awarded an Amanda Award for Best Actor in a Supporting Role.
Olsenbanden Jr. og Sølvgruvens hemmelighet	Arne Lindtner Næss			
The Radio Pirates	Stig Svendsen	Gard Eidsvold, Henrik Mestad, Ane Dahl Torp, Per Christian Ellefsen	Drama / family	
Switch	Ole Martin Hafsmo	Peter Stormare	Youth drama	
USA vs. Al-Arian	Line Halvorsen		Documentary	Awarded the Audience Prize at the Tromsø International Film Festival
2008
Backwoods	Patrik Syversen	Henriette Brusgaard, Lasse Valdal	Horror	
Cold Prey 2	Mats Stenberg	Ingrid Bolsø Berdal	Horror	
Fallen Angels	Morten Tyldum	Trond Espen Seim, Bjørn Floberg, Pia Tjelta	Thriller / crime	Part of the Varg Veum series.
House of Fools	Eva Isaksen	Ingrid Bolsø Bærdal, Fridtjov Såheim, Anneke von der Lippe	Drama	
Fatso	Arild Fröhlich	Nils Jørgen Kaalstad	Drama / comedy	
The Kautokeino Rebellion	Nils Gaup	Mikael Persbrandt, Mikkel Gaup, Bjørn Sundquist	Drama / action	
Kurt turns Evil	Rasmus Sivertsen		Animation	Based on a novel by Erlend Loe
Long Flat Balls II	Harald Zwart	Don Johnson	Comedy	
The Man Who Loved Yngve	Stian Kristiansen	Rolf Kristian Larsen, Jørgen Langhelle	Drama	Was nominated for the 2008 Nordic Council Film Prize.
Max Manus	Joachim Rønning, Espen Sandberg	Aksel Hennie	War / biography	
Troubled Water	Erik Poppe	Pål Sverre Valheim Hagen	Drama	
2009
The Orange Girl	Eva Dahr	Annie Dahr Nygaard	Drama	Based on a book by Jostein Gaarder.
Betrayal	Håkon Gundersen	Lene Nystrøm, Kåre Conradi, Fritjov Såheim, Jørgen Langhelle, Ingrid Bolsø Berdal, Götz Otto	War / thriller	
Dead Snow	Tommy Wirkola		Horror / comedy	
Magic Silver	Katarina Launing, Roar Uthaug	Ane Viola Semb, Johan Tinus Lindgren, Jan Gunnar Røise, Finn Schau	Children's / family	Original title: Julenatt i Blåfjell
North	Rune Denstad Langlo	Anders Baasmo Christiansen	Drama / comedy	Was nominated for the 2009 Nordic Council Film Prize.
Upperdog	Sara Johnsen		Drama	
Vegas	Gunnar Vikene	Helge Jordal	Drama	
Hidden	Pål Øie	Kristoffer Joner	Psychological horror	
