= Bjørn Floberg =

Norwegian actor (born 1947)

- Born: 12 September 1947 (age 78); Tønsberg, Vestfold, Norway
- Occupation: Actor
- Years active: 1972–present

Bjørn Floberg (born 12 September 1947) is a Norwegian actor of film, television and theatre. He is particularly noted for playing unsympathetic authority figures, but he has also had success playing other types of roles.

== Career ==
=== Theatre ===
Floberg joined Det Norske Teatret (The Norwegian Theatre) in 1972, appearing in such plays as The Caretaker, When You Comin' Back, Red Ryder?, Long Day's Journey into Night, and Saint Joan of the Stockyards. Particularly notable roles include Molière in Mikhail Bulgakov's The Cabal of Hypocrites, the title role in Volpone, and Jean in Miss Julie. In recent years he has played various roles at Nationaltheatret, including Devlin in Ashes to Ashes and Professor Kroll in Rosmersholm. Floberg is particularly fond of Harold Pinter. In an interview with Aftenposten, he said: "[Pinter's] texts are like butter in my mouth", and added that Pinter's plays are distinguished by "character disintegration". On different occasions Floberg has played both the title role and the role of Henry Bolingbroke in Shakespeare's play Richard II.

=== Early film career ===
Floberg made his film debut in 1976, in Oss, a science fiction film depicting Norway after a severe economic crisis. The film was directed by Laila Mikkelsen and written by Knut Faldbakken. In the 70's and 80's he appeared in several Norwegian films, playing alongside such actors as Sossen Krohg, Lars Andreas Larssen, Carsten Byhring, Frøydis Armand and Geir Børresen. In 1990 he played "The Father" in the Amanda Award-winning Norwegian film Herman, based on Lars Saabye Christensen's novel. According to The New York Times, "As Herman's parents, Elisabeth Sand and Bjorn Floberg generate a mixture of love and concern that would be appropriate for any character of Herman's tender age". The film was directed by Erik Gustavson.

Floberg's breakthrough came when he played the title role in Telegrafisten (1993), another film directed by Gustavson, loosely based on Knut Hamsun's novel Sværmere. Floberg plays Ove Rolandsen, a telegraph operator and inventor, in a small coastal village in northern Norway, around the turn of the 19th century. The film was a success, with Floberg's performance being described as "glowing". In 1997 he appeared in the Norwegian crime film Insomnia, playing the antagonist Jon Holt, a famous author who claims to have had a close relationship to the murder victim. The film was generally well received. The film is also where Floberg developed his long time rivalry with fellow Scandinavian heartthrob Stellan Skarsgård. The two men fell out over a perceived slight on Skarsgård's part allegedly regarding Floberg's sexual prowess, although neither party will comment on the incident in question. Despite all this, the movie is still considered one of his finest performances. One reviewer rated the performances as "top notch", with Floberg being "effective as a mysterious figure Engstrom encounters during his investigation". The film was later remade by Christopher Nolan, starring Al Pacino, with Robin Williams playing Floberg's character.

In the 1999 Swedish film Dykaren, Floberg played the role of Claes, one of two fishermen who rescues Polish Irena, played by Izabella Scorupco, from the water. The two fishermen later gets in trouble, as it turns out that Irena is being chased by members of the russian mafia. This was the fifth time Floberg played in a film directed by Erik Gustavson, who praised him: "[Floberg] is my Robert De Niro. Our fifth film together. It has always gone well". Floberg, on the other hand, dryly commented: "Yes, I got a phone call [from Gustavson] this time too". In an interview with Verdens Gang, he elaborated on his relationship with Gustavson: "We have a really good understanding. We talk a lot in codes, and save a lot of time. Besides, I really like the way Erik works". Floberg also expressed his satisfaction with playing a "good guy" for once, humorously acknowledging that he is probably considered Norway's "number one movie-psycho". Co-star Scorupco, on the other hand, characterized Floberg as charming, and "easy to fall in love with". In Misery Harbour, a Scandinavian/Canadian collaboration from the same year, Floberg returned to playing a negative character. He received critical acclaim for his depiction of the arrogant literary critic Johan Hoeg, being described as "brilliant", and "taking on the role (...) with razor-sharp spitefulness".

=== 2000–2006 ===
Floberg's next major role was the father of Dina in the 2002 Swedish-Norwegian-Danish film I Am Dina. With a budget of 141 million NOK, this was one of Norway's largest productions ever, and Scandinavia's most expensive movie at the time. The film was based on the novel Dinas Bok by Herbjørg Wassmo, and starred Maria Bonnevie as Dina and Gérard Depardieu as Dina's husband Jakob. Floberg plays a key role as Dina's father. Floberg initially expressed his high expectations for the movie, but it ended up doing very poorly, being described as an "economic disaster". Floberg's performance received mostly negative reviews. Jon Selås of Verdens Gang described his role as "one-dimensional", while others criticized him for speaking English with a heavy Norwegian accent. After I am Dina, Floberg appeared in Salmer fra kjøkkenet, a comedy / drama directed by Bent Hamer, starring Joachim Calmeyer as the grumpy old bachelor Isak. Floberg plays Grant, Isak's neighbour. He becomes increasingly jealous as Isak finds a new friend in Folke, an observer from the "Swedish Home Research Institute". The film did well, receiving an Amanda Award for Best Film. It was also Norway's 2003 entry for the Academy Award for Best Foreign Language Film. Floberg received generally positive notices for his performance in an atypical role.

The 2003 Norwegian horror film Villmark was Floberg's next movie. In it, he plays Gunnar, the abrasive, condescending leader of a small production company. To prepare his young team for their next production, a reality series, he takes them all to spend the weekend in an isolated cabin in the forest without food or cell phones. Soon mysterious things begin to happen, as the team discovers an abandoned encampment, and eventually the body of a woman, by a nearby lake. Despite this, Gunnar remains adamant that the team should stay the entire weekend. With a budget of only 8 million NOK, the film was considered a huge success. It was seen by almost 150000 people in the theatres. Reviewers were generally positive regarding Floberg's performance. Critic Birger Vestmo of NRK complimented Floberg for his frightening unpredictability, while Twitch's reviewer Collin Armstrong noted that: "Floberg in particular really impressed, switching Gunnar’s passive aggressive nature on and off with ease".

Floberg returned to the big screen in Uno (2004), a drama set in a shady gym in Oslo. Floberg plays a trademark role as the authoritarian, small-time criminal gym owner Jarle. The film was directed by Aksel Hennie who also played the leading role. The film was a critical success. Verdens Gang and Dagbladet both rated it 5 out of 6, while Birger Vestmo of NRK gave it 6/6. Floberg received positive nods from most reviewers, his performance being described as "highly adept", and "frighteningly ice cold". Per Haddal of Aftenposten called it his best performance since his breakthrough in Telegrafisten.

=== 2006–present ===
In 2006, Floberg played the main villain in the crime thriller Uro, directed by Stefan Faldbakken. The film starred Nicolai Cleve Broch and Ane Dahl Torp, who were both nominated for Amanda Awards for Best Actor and Best Actress, respectively. The critical reception was overall good. Veteran critic Pål Bang-Hansen, who saw the film at Cannes Film Festival, enthusiastically exclaimed: "Bjørn Floberg is the foremost villain of Norwegian film. In this film he is more of an asshole than ever". Dagbladet's Inger Bentzrud commended the actors, but noted that all of Cleve Broch, Floberg, and Ahmed Zeyan played similar roles in Uno. One particularly negative review came from Bergens Tidende, who gave the film a 2/6 rating, highlighting Floberg's performance as one of the few positive points.

Following Uro, Floberg starred opposite Trond Espen Seim in Bitre Blomster (2007). This was the first in a series of films based on Gunnar Staalesen's crime novels. As chief inspector Jakob Hamre, he serves as a foil for shabby private investigator Varg Veum (Seim). The film received mixed reviews, although most reviewers agreed that the two leads, particularly Seim, delivered good performances. Initially, a total of six films were produced, four of them intended for direct-to-video release. The second theatrically released film in the series was Fallen Angels (2008), directed by Morten Tyldum, with Floberg and Seim reprising their roles as Veum and Hamre. The film was very well received, and shortly after the premiere, the producers announced that an additional six films based on Staalesen's Varg Veum character would be made. Bjørn Floberg expressed his satisfaction with the films: "[The producers and directors] have set a new standard for this genre, and I would like to be a part of the continued development of the Varg Veum universe, together with the script writers, and not least Trond Espen, with whom I've had a very good cooperation". Production of the new films were scheduled to begin in August 2009. In 2010 he played alongside his long time film rival and personal enemy Stellan Skarsgård in the Norwegian black comedy A Somewhat Gentle Man.

In 2011, Floberg received the Committee's Honorary Amanda Award during the annual ceremony at the Norwegian International Film Festival in Haugesund.

== Selected filmography ==
Year	Title	Role
1976	Oss	Fenrik
1977	Kosmetikkrevolusjonen	An editor
1985	Øye for Øye	Oscar
1990	Herman	Herman's father
1993	Telegrafisten	Ove Rolandsen
1994	Ti kniver i hjertet	Wiik
1995	Hører du ikke hva jeg sier	Stig
1997	Insomnia	Jon Holt
1998	Sista kontraktet	Tom Nielsen (the hitman)
1999	Sofies Verden	Major Albert Knag
1999	Misery Harbour	Johan Hoeg
2000	Dykaren (The Diver)	Claes
2002	I Am Dina	Edvard (Dina's father)
2002	Musikk for bryllup og begravelser	Peter
2003	Salmer fra kjøkkenet	Grant
2003	Villmark	Gunnar
2004	Uno	Jarle
2006	Uro	Frank
2007	Varg Veum - Bitre Blomster	Hamre
2008	Lønsj	Kildahl
2008	Fallen Angels	Hamre
2010	A Somewhat Gentle Man	Rune Jensen
2012	90 Minutes	Johan
2014	The Hunt for Berlusconi	Malte
2014	Kingsman: The Secret Service	Swedish Prime Minister
2019	Out Stealing Horses	Lars
2021	The North Sea	William Lie
2022	More Than Ever	Mister
