= Fallen Angels (2008 film) =

2008 Norwegian film

- Directed by: Morten Tyldum
- Written by: Thomas Moldestad; Gunnar Staalesen
- Cinematography: John Andreas Andersen
- Edited by: Jon Endre Mørk
- Music by: Ginge
- Production company: Miso Film
- Distributed by: SF Norge
- Release date: April 4, 2008
- Running time: 95 minutes
- Country: Norway
- Language: Norwegian
- Box office: $1.9 million

Fallen Angels (Norwegian: Varg Veum: Falne engler) is a 2008 Norwegian film directed by Morten Tyldum. It was nominated for numerous Amanda Awards in 2008. It is the fourth film in the Varg Veum series.

== Cast ==
- Trond Espen Seim as Varg Veum
- Per Kjerstad as Jacob
- Bjørn Floberg as Hamre
- Pia Tjelta as Rebecca
- Fridtjov Såheim as Simon
