= Endre Hellestveit =

Norwegian actor

Endre Hellestveit (born 7 August 1976 in Rosendal in Kvinnherad Municipality) is a Norwegian actor. He plays Isachsen in the Varg Veum series of crime films.

== Education ==
Hellestveit was previously a ski instructor at Gautefall in Telemark before he joined the military service in Norway. He was there for just two years and served in their diving squad. He then continued his studies in Australia, but ended up at BI Norwegian Business School in Bergen. He was then taken up by the Norwegian National Academy of Theatre in Oslo.

== Film, theatre and television ==
He made his debut in the film The Biggest in the World ( 2001) with Herborg Kråkevik, and later he played a taxi driver in the film Himmelfall (2002), and valet Jan Isachsen in the Varg Veum series (2007–2008).

After the theatre academy he went to Den Nationale Scene where he played, among other things, lawyer Krogstad in Henrik Ibsen's A Doll's House, and Adolf Hitler in Mein Kampf. He became a permanent employee at Det Norske Teatret where he played Peer Gynt, and Rick in the play Katt på hett tinktak opposite Ane Dahl Torp.

He has also played 11 episodes in the TV series Seks som oss (2005–2007) as Lisa Tønne 's boyfriend. In Det tredje øyet he played Kårstein Omvik.

== Filmography ==
Year	Title	Role	Notes
2001	Det største i verden	Gunnar	
2002	Himmelfall	Thomas	
2007	Bitter Flowers	Isachsen	
2008	Fallen Angels	Isachsen	
2010	Cold Prey 3	Fjellmannen	
2013	Pioneer	Trond	
2018	22 July	Security Official #1	
2019	Amundsen	Peter Tessem	
