= Faldbakken =

Faldbakken is a Norwegian surname. Notable people with the surname include:

- Knut Faldbakken (born 1941), Norwegian novelist
- Matias Faldbakken (born 1973), Norwegian artist and writer
- Stefan Faldbakken (born 1972), Norwegian film director and screenwriter
