= Bitter Flowers =

Bitter Flowers may refer to:

- Bitter Flowers (2007 film), a Norwegian crime thriller film
- Bitter Flowers (2017 film), a drama film directed by Olivier Meys
