= Alexander Eik =

Norwegian actor and film director

- Born: January 8, 1972 (age 54); Oslo
- Occupations: actor; film director; screenwriter

Alexander Eik (born in Oslo on 8 January 1972) is a Norwegian director, screenwriter, series creator, and executive producer in the film company Cinenord AS, where he is also co-owner and head of script development. Eik made his feature film debut in 2003 with the blockbuster success

== Education and career ==
Eik is a trained visual artist from the painting line at the Norwegian National Academy of Craft and Art Industry. Early in his film career, he directed short films and music videos for a number of well-known artists. Eik's short film Første akt (English: First act) won the Amanda Award for Best Short Film in 2001. Eik's music video for the song High on the Crime by the band Turbonegro won the MTV Music Awards in 2005. Eik made his feature film debut in 2003 with the blockbuster success Kvinnen i mitt liv.

=== Crime series ===
Alexander Eik directed three of the films in the Varg Veum based on the books by Gunnar Staalesen. In addition, he was responsible for script development on the last six films in the Varg Veum series, and he wrote the screenplay for one of these films himself. Eik is also executive producer on the crime series Wisting, which is based on the book series by Jørn Lier Horst.

=== Benefit concert (2010) ===
In 2010, Alexander Eik initiated a concert for Haiti, which was a benefit concert to raise money for the victims of the earthquake in Haiti. The concert was arranged by an action group consisting of a dozen people from Norwegian cultural life, where Eik was one of the project leaders. A number of well-known artists performed at the concert, which was performed at the National Opera's stage and broadcast live on NRK on 24 January 2010, with Princess Märtha Louise present. The event raised NOK 24 million, with the proceeds going to the Norwegian Church Aid, UNICEF, and the Red Cross' relief work in Haiti. For his efforts, Alexander Eik was honored by the Red Cross with the President's plaque of honour, presented by then Red Cross President, Sven Mollekleiv, during the organization's national executive committee meeting on 14 April 2010.

=== Atlantic Crossing (2020) ===
Alexander Eik is also the series creator of the Emmy Award-winning series Atlantic Crossing, an eight-episode drama series about Crown Princess Märtha of Norway and other Norwegian royal family's experiences during World War II. In Norway, the series caused fierce debate, and several historians publicly stated that the portrayal of the Crown Princess's significance for the role the United States played in the war was roughly signed, and that other historical figures also attributed words and actions that were far removed from how these individuals appeared in reality. The series creators were also criticized for the series by the Norwegian Broadcasting Council.

== Family ==
Alexander Eik has five children and is married to film producer Silje Hopland Eik. His brother is Joacim Lund, who is a commentator in Aftenposten. His sister is Monica Boracco, president of the Writers' Guild of Norway.

== Filmography ==
=== Actor ===
- 2003: Kvinnen i mitt liv
- 2006: Kalde føtter
- 2008: Varg Veum – Kvinnen i kjøleskapet
- 2008: Varg Veum – Begravde hunder

=== Screenwriter ===
- 2000: Første akt
- 2011: Varg Veum – I mørket er alle ulver grå
- 2014: Karsten og Petra på vinterferie
- 2015: Karsten og Petra på safari
- 2020: Atlantic Crossing

=== Director ===
- 2000: Første akt
- 2003: Kvinnen i mitt liv
- 2006: Kalde føtter
- 2007: Nattsøsteren
- 2008: Varg Veum
- 2009: Orkestergraven
- 2011: Varg Veum
- 2020: Atlantic Crossing
