= Atlantic Crossing (TV series) =

Historical mini-series set in Norway & US during WWII

- Genre: Historical drama
- Created by: Alexander Eik
- Written by: Alexander Eik; Linda May Kallestein
- Directed by: Alexander Eik; Janic Heen
- Starring: Sofia Helin; Kyle MacLachlan; Tobias Santelmann; Søren Pilmark; Anneke von der Lippe
- Theme music composer: Susanne Sundfør
- Opening theme: "When"
- Composer: Raymond Enoksen
- Country of origin: Norway
- Original languages: Norwegian, English
- No. of seasons: 1
- No. of episodes: 8

Production
- Executive producers: Tone Rønning; Justus Riesenkampff; Friedemann Goez; Sofia Helin; Anni Faurbye Fernandez; James Cabourne; Susanne Simpson; Sofie Wanting Hassing
- Producer: Silje Hopland Eik
- Production location: Norway
- Cinematography: Carl Sundberg
- Editors: Silje Nordseth; Morten Rørvig
- Camera setup: Multiple camera
- Running time: 52-55 minutes
- Production company: Cinenord

Original release
- Network: NRK
- Release: 25 October – 13 December 2020

Atlantic Crossing is a historical drama in the form of a television miniseries set in Norway and the United States during World War II. The series is wide-ranging but pays special attention to interactions between Crown Princess Martha of Norway and President Franklin Roosevelt during the period when Martha was a war refugee in the United States after fleeing the 1940 Nazi Invasion of Norway.

Some portions with Norwegian, Danish or Swedish spoken dialogue are subtitled in English. It premiered on 25 October 2020 on NRK in Norway. The series premiered 4 April 2021 on Masterpiece on PBS.

== Production ==
The eight part series was co-produced by the Norwegian independent production company Cinenord, Norway's public broadcaster NRK and the US Public Broadcasting Service (PBS). Most of the series was filmed in the Czech Republic and Norway.

== Main cast ==
- Sofia Helin as Crown Princess Märtha of Norway
- Tobias Santelmann as Crown Prince Olav of Norway
- Kyle MacLachlan as Franklin Delano Roosevelt, President of the United States
- Søren Pilmark as King Haakon VII of Norway
- Anneke von der Lippe as Ragni Østgaard, Crown Princess Märtha's lady-in-waiting

=== Recurring ===
- Harriet Sansom Harris as Eleanor Roosevelt, First Lady of the United States
- Daniel Betts as Harry Hopkins, Roosevelt's closest advisor on foreign policy affairs during the war
- Lucy Russell as Missy LeHand, Roosevelt's private secretary
- Suzanne Bertish as Florence Harriman, U.S. ambassador to Norway
- Leonora Eik as Princess Ragnhild of Norway
- Amathea Eik as Princess Astrid of Norway
- Justýna Brozková as Prince Harald of Norway
- Michael Pitthan as King George VI of the United Kingdom
- Abigail Rice as Queen Elizabeth of the United Kingdom
- Lasse Kolsrud as Nikolai Ramm-Østgaard, Olav's aide-de-camp
- Petr Meissel as Oswald Nordlie, King Haakon's aide-de-camp
- Terje Ranes as Johan Nygaardsvoll, Prime Minister of Norway
- Stig Ryste Amdam as General Carl Gustav Fleischer, commander of the Norwegian infantry brigade based in Scotland
- Trond Teigen as Wilhelm von Munthe af Morgenstierne, Norwegian Ambassador to the United States

=== Guest ===
- Erik Hivju as General Otto Ruge, Commander-in-chief of the Royal Norwegian Armed Forces
- Marianne Høgsbro as Princess Ingeborg, Duchess of Västergötland, Crown Princess Märtha's mother
- Jan Tiselius as Prince Carl, Duke of Västergötland, Crown Princess Märtha's father
- Carl-Magnus Dellow as King Gustaf V of Sweden, Crown Princess Märtha's uncle
- Oscar Töringe as Prince Carl Bernadotte, Crown Princess Märtha's brother
- Fredrik Dolk as Per Albin Hansson, Prime Minister of Sweden
- Hartmut Krug as Victor Prinz zu Wied, German Ambassador to Sweden
- Fridtjov Såheim as Alfred Isaksen, a double amputee and survivor of the Arctic convoys
- Håkon Karoliussen as Captain John Mansfield, Commanding officer of the cruiser HMS Norfolk
- Dan Cade as Private Joseph L. Lockard, a soldier manning the radar station at a hilltop at Opana Point, Oahu
- Stanislav Callas as Private George R. Elliot Jr., Lockard's colleague and fellow radio operator
