= Magic Silver II =

- Slovak film poster
- Norwegian: Blåfjell 2: Jakten på det magiske horn
- Directed by: Arne Lindtner Næss
- Written by: Thomas Moldestad; Gudny Hagen
- Produced by: Jørgen Storm Rosenberg; Lasse Greve Alsos
- Starring: Ane Viola Semb; Johan Tinus Austad Lindgren; Toralv Maurstad; Elsa Lystad; Per Christian Ellefsen; Stig-Werner Moe; Simon Andersen; Geir Morstad
- Distributed by: Storm Rosenberg
- Release date: 18 November 2011
- Running time: 85 minutes
- Country: Norway
- Language: Norwegian

Magic Silver II (Norwegian: Blåfjell 2: Jakten på det magiske horn; lit. 'Blue Mountain II: The Hunt for the Magic Horn') is a 2011 Norwegian children's adventure film. The Blaafarveværket industrial museum was used as a setting. The film is a sequel to the 2009 film Magic Silver and was the first 3D film produced in Norway. It was viewed in the theaters by 272,719 people, and was the first Scandinavian 3-D live action film.

== Cast ==
- Ane Viola Semb as Fjellrose
- Johan Tinus Lindgren as Dreng
- Toralv Maurstad as Mosetussen
- Per Christian Ellefsen as Rimspå
- Elsa Lystad as Gamlemor
- Robert Skjærstad as Nissefyken
- Geir Morstad as Kullbaronen
- Stig Werner Moe as Mons
- Simon Andersen as Pilten
