= Mama Tumaini =

- Directed by: Martin Mhando; Sigve Endresen
- Written by: Tololwa Marti Mollel
- Starring: Penina Mlama Sigrid Huun Mary Chibwana; Per Christian Ellefsen
- Cinematography: Selemani Kissoky
- Music by: John Mgandu; Dionisius Mbilinyi; Øistein Boassen; Arne Moslåtten
- Distributed by: Tanzania Filmcomp; Motlys; NRK
- Release date: August 18, 1986
- Running time: 61 minutes
- Countries: Norway, Tanzania
- Languages: Swahili, Norwegian

Mama Tumaini – Tumaini betyr håp (Mother Hope) is a Norwegian–Tanzanian drama film and family film from 1986. It was directed by Martin Mhando and Sigve Endresen. The story takes place in Tanzania and Norway. The film is based on an African script, and it mostly features African actors and an African crew.

The film was produced with support from the Norwegian Agency for Development Cooperation. The film was not released in commercial theaters in Norway, but screened at the Norwegian International Film Festival, held in Kristiansand in 1986.

== Plot ==
Two women, one black and one white, meet in Dar es Salaam in East Africa in 1986. Both are there because of their men. The white woman is a professional's wife, and the black woman is leaving her village because her husband is taking a job in the big city. Across the racial divide and major social and economic barriers, a friendship develops between the two women. The plot is based on a real event that happened in the 1970s.

== Cast ==
- Mary Chibwana
- Per Christian Ellefsen as Jan
- Sigrid Huun as Lisbeth
- Penina Mlama as Mama Tumaini
