= Stig Henrik Hoff =

Norwegian actor (born 1965)

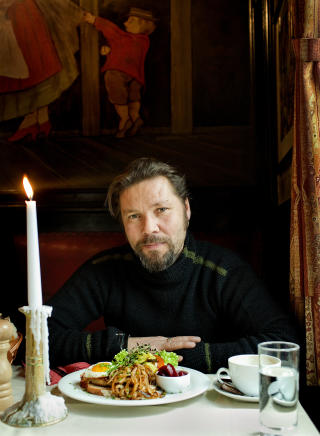
- Hoff in 2010
- Born: 4 February 1965 (age 60); Vadsø, Norway
- Occupation: Actor
- Years active: 1991–present
- Parent: Trygve Henrik Hoff
- Website: hoffern.com

Stig Henrik Hoff (born 4 February 1965) is a Norwegian actor. He was born in Vadsø but grew up in Berlevåg and Darbu. He is the son of Norwegian singer and writer Trygve Henrik Hoff.

== Selected filmography ==
=== Film ===
List of film appearances, with year, title, and role shown
Year	Title	Role	Notes
1991	Byttinger	G.T.	
1997	Burnt by Frost	Simon	
1998	1732 Høtten	Dwayne	
2000	Når mørket er forbi	Josef Omgang	
2002	Pelle Politibil	Høgger'n	
2003	Fia og klovnene	Siggen	
2004	A Cry in the Woods	Morgan	
2004	Hawaii, Oslo	Frode	
2006	Comrade Pedersen	Jan Klåstad	
2008	The Kautokeino Rebellion	Stockfleths assistent	
2008	Ulvenatten	Vidar Bø	
2008	Troubled Water	Fengselsprest	
2008	Max Manus: Man of War	Politikaptein Eilertsen	
2011	The Thing	Peder	
2012	Mercy	Björn	
2012	Into the White	Feldwebel Wolfgang Strunk	
2013	Victoria	Camillas far	
2014	In Order of Disappearance	Experienced Police Officer	
2014	Glassdukkene	Aslak	
2016	The Last King	Erlend	
2016	Dyrene i Hakkebakkeskogen	Mikkel Rev	Voice
2017	Juleblod	Thomas Rasch	
2018	Los Bando	Simen	
2022	Narvik	Aslak Tofte	

=== Television ===
List of television appearances, with year, title, and role shown
Year	Title	Role	Notes
2008–10	Hvaler	Espen Aronsen	21 episodes
2013	Lilyhammer	Willy	3 episodes
2017	Borderliner	Lindberg	4 episodes
2019	Beforeigners	Tommy	4 episodes
2021	Welcome to Utmark	Bilzi	3 episodes
