= Grete Nordrå =

Norwegian actress (1924–2012)

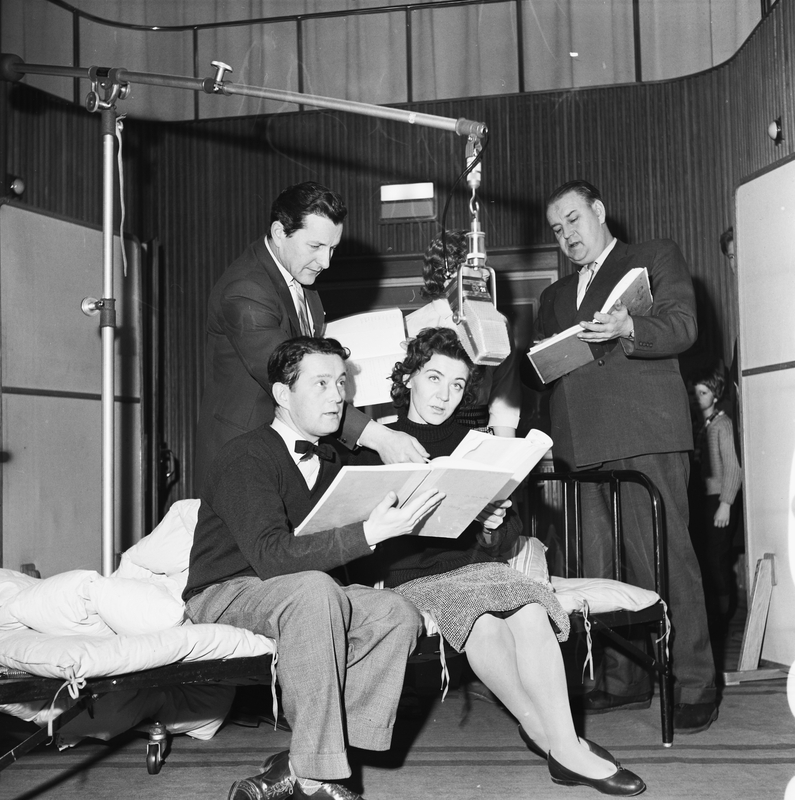
- Norwegian Broadcasting Radio Theatre Studio 1959. Actors Jack Fjeldstad, Jan Pande-Rolfsen, Grete Nordrå and author Alf Prøysen
- Born: 22 November 1924; Asker, Norway
- Died: 13 March 2012 (aged 87); Bergen, Norway

Grete Nordrå (22 November 1924 – 13 March 2012) was a Norwegian actress who appeared on screen from the 1950s onwards. She was born in Asker.

She made her screen debut in 1955 when she appeared in Trost i taklampa. Over the next 35 years, her roles were few and far between, but in 1990 she appeared as a Norwegian witch in the film adaptation of Roald Dahl's The Witches, and her screen appearances since then have been more frequent, though still mostly on Norwegian television. Her biggest commercial success was co-starring in 2003's Mors Elling as the mother of title character. She was nominated for an Amanda Award for her performance. She died in 2012 in Bergen.

== Filmography ==
Year	Title	Role	Notes
1955	Trost i taklampa	Gunvor Smikkstugun	
1957	Nine Lives	Stenografen	
1970	Douglas	Fru Ahrman	
1971	Rødblått paradis		
1975	Hustruer	Uteligger	
1984	On the Threshold	Fru Lund	
1990	The Witches	Norwegian Witch	
1990	Landstrykere	Edevarts mor	
1991	For dagene er onde	Ane	
1999	Bornholms stemme	Line	
1999	Evas øye	Damen med hund	
2000	Da jeg traff Jesus... med sprettert		
2001	Det største i verden	Tine	
2003	Mother's Elling	Mor	
