= Kari Rolfsen =

Norwegian sculptor and illustrator (1938–2020)

- Born: 12 October 1938; Oslo, Norway
- Died: 8 December 2020 (aged 82); Oslo, Norway
- Education: Norwegian National Academy of Craft and Art Industry; Norwegian National Academy of Fine Arts; Accademia di Belle Arti di Firenze; Royal Danish Academy of Fine Arts
- Occupations: Sculptor, illustrator and comics creator
- Spouse: Karl Erik Harr (m. 1963–1968)
- Children: Ulrik Imtiaz Rolfsen

Kari Rolfsen (12 October 1938 – 8 December 2020) was a Norwegian sculptor and illustrator.

== Career ==
Rolfsen was born in Oslo, a daughter of Aase Espetvedt and Rolf Rolfsen, and was married to Karl Erik Harr. She studied at the Norwegian National Academy of Craft and Art Industry and further at the Norwegian National Academy of Fine Arts under the supervision of Per Palle Storm, further at Accademia di Belle Arti di Firenze in Firenze, and at the Royal Danish Academy of Fine Arts under supervision of Mogens Bøggild.

Her sculptural works include På vei til bingo? (1975), Gammel kone med veske (1978; Gjøvik) and statue of Kristin Lavransdatter (1972), bust of Gisle Straume, reliefs of Andreas Mørch, Sigrid Undset and Cecilie Thoresen, and monument of Theodor Kittelsen. She illustrated books, including Constance Ring by Amalie Skram, covers of folk music albums, and she created the comics series Jensen in the feminist magazine Sirene.

She is represented with works in the National Museum of Art, Architecture and Design in Oslo.

Rolfsen died in Oslo on 8 December 2020.
