= Burnt by Frost =

- Directed by: Knut Erik Jensen
- Written by: Knut Erik Jensen; Alf R. Jacobsen
- Starring: Stig Henrik Hoff; Gørild Mauseth; Reidar Sørensen; Iris Johansen; Katja Medbøe; Yevgeny Sidikhin
- Release date: 29 August 1997
- Running time: 97 minutes
- Country: Norway
- Language: Norwegian

Burnt by Frost (Norwegian: Brent av frost) is a 1997 Norwegian drama film directed by Knut Erik Jensen, starring Stig Henrik Hoff and Gørild Mauseth. Simon (Stig Henrik Hoff) helps a group of Soviet partisans during World War II. After the war is over, he is recruited as a Soviet spy.
