= Betrayal (2009 film) =

- Directed by: Håkon Gundersen
- Written by: Håkon Gundersen
- Starring: Fridtjov Såheim; Lene Nystrøm; Kåre Conradi; Götz Otto
- Release date: 9 October 2009
- Running time: 103 minutes
- Country: Norway
- Language: Norwegian

Betrayal (Norwegian: Svik) is a 2009 Norwegian historic action film directed by Håkon Gundersen, starring Fridtjov Såheim, Lene Nystrøm, Götz Otto and Kåre Conradi. The film is based on a true story.

== Plot ==
During the German occupation of Norway, nightclub owner Tor Lindblom (Såheim) makes a fortune by collaborating with the Germans. With the help of SS-Sturmbannführer Krüger (Otto), he plans to exploit the construction of a new aluminium plant for his own benefit. At the same time he is also romantically involved with Eva Karlsen (Nystrøm), a singer at the nightclub, who is a British double agent.

== Reception ==
Norwegian reviewers were generally negative in their view of Betrayal. In a review for newspaper Verdens Gang, Morten Ståle Nilsen gave it a "die throw" of two and called the film an "awkward amateur night". Ingunn Økland of Aftenposten gave it three points, calling it a "missed opportunity" to make what could have been "an important Norwegian war film".
