= The Radio Pirates =

- Directed by: Stig Svendsen
- Written by: Gunnar Germundson (also radio play)
- Produced by: Håkon Øverås; Aagot Skjeldal
- Starring: Gard Eidsvold; Henrik Mestad; Per Christian Ellefsen; Ane Dahl Torp
- Cinematography: John Andreas Andersen
- Edited by: Pål Gengenbach; Siv Ebelstoft
- Music by: Bjørnar Johnsen
- Distributed by: Nordisk Filmdistribusjon (Norway only)
- Release date: September 14, 2007
- Running time: 85 minutes
- Country: Norway
- Language: Norwegian
- Budget: 15,000,000 kr (estimated)

The Radio Pirates (Norwegian: Radiopiratene) is a Norwegian family film released in 2007, directed by first-time director Stig Svendsen and is based on a radio play by Gunnar Germundson. It stars Gard B. Eidsvold, Per Christian Ellefsen, Henrik Mestad and Ane Dahl Torp.

== Plot ==
The Radio Pirates is the story of Karl Jonathan and his father. They leave the city for the father's dilapidated childhood home but soon realise that the entire village of "Skjelleruten" has been transformed into the ultimate safe society, where children are strictly protected from behaving like children. Karl Jonathan and his new friend, Sisseline, start an uprising against this model village with the aid of a closed-down pirate radio. But the model citizens refuse to give in without a fight.
