= Ulrik Imtiaz Rolfsen =

Norwegian film director

- Born: 4 May 1972 (age 54); Oslo, Norway
- Occupations: Film director, screenwriter, writer
- Years active: 2005–Present
- Mother: Kari Rolfsen
- Awards: Best movie, Kosmorama film festival (2006); Gullruten (2012); The Rhino Prize (2014); Ossietzky (2015) Freedom Of Expression Award from PEN Norway

Ulrik Imtiaz Rolfsen (born 4 May 1972) is a Norwegian film director, producer and writer. He is best known for his action drama IZZAT (2005), his TV series TAXI (2011) as well as documentary films Voluntarily Forced (2014) and Recruiting for Jihad (2017). He often addresses national- and global discussion concerning immigration and racism both in his films as well as being an outspoken newspaper columnist and television debattant. In 2012 he founded the Oslo-based production company Curry Film AS. Other films directed by him, are the crime thriller Varg Veum - Bitter Flowers (2007) and the slacker comedy The Last Joint Venture (2008).

== Filmography ==
- Import Eksport (2005) - co-director
- IZZAT (2005) - writer/ director
- Varg Veum-Bitter Flowers (2007) - director
- The Last Joint Venture (2008)
- TAXI (2011) - writer/ director
- Haram (2014) - director/ producer
- Voluntarily Forced (2014) (documentary) - director/ producer
- Recruiting For Jihad (2017) (documentary) - director/producer
- In The Dark (2017) (TV series) - director

Ulrik Imtiaz Rolfsen directed part two (episodes 3&4) of In The Dark, a four-part drama, starting MyAnna Buring, written by Bafta-winning writer Danny Brocklehurst (Ordinary Lies, The Driver, Exile) for BBC One. Adapted from the books by best-selling novelist Mark Billingham, In The Dark centers around the engaging and complex female detective Helen Weeks, in two separate stories.

== Awards ==
- 2006: Audience Award, IZZAT, best movie Kosmorama film festival
- 2012: Gullruten (Golden Screen) Best Drama - TAXI
- 2014: The Rhino Prize (Neshornpprisen), Klassekampen
- 2015: The Ossietzky Prize, Freedom Of Expression Award, Norwegian PEN(a department of PEN international)

== Early life ==
Rolfsen was born and raised in Hasle, Oslo. His father is a Pakistani immigrant and his mother, acclaimed artist, Kari Rolfsen. From the age of 11 Rolfsen engaged in fighting everyday racism as a youth associate of Norwegian Centre Against Racism.

== Career ==
In 1992 Rolfsen majored in drama at Hartvig Nissen High School in Oslo. Instead of attending college, he moved to New York City 1992-1993 to work as a photographer's assistant as well as serving as an intern editing documentary films. Back in Oslo he started a career as a still photographer and directed advertisement films for many years, as well as music-videos.

Rolfsens most notable success has been as a feature film director. In 2005 Rolfsen wrote and directed his first feature movie, IZZAT, produced by Filmkameratene. It is a coming of age action drama telling the story of Pakistani gangsters in Oslo. The movie received 4 nominations (including Best Cinematic Movie) at the Norwegian film awards AMANDA in 2006.

In 2014 Ulrik Imtiaz Rolfsen wrote, directed and produced the sequel to IZZAT, Haram (http://www.haramfilm.no) as a low budget film, produced and theatrically distributed in Norway by Curry Film.

The Norwegian thriller TV-series Taxi (2011) has been Ulrik Imtiaz Rolfsen's most noted international success. Written and directed by Rolfsen it also illustrates issues concerning Norway's multi cultured society. The TV-series won Best TV-drama in Norway 2012, in Gullruten. The successful TV-series was produced by Norwegian Broadcast Corporation (NRK) and a remake is currently being developed by the independent production company New Pictures, with development commissioned by the BBC.

Ulrik Imtiaz Rolfsen wrote the thriller-novel The Pipeline (Gass) in 2012, as a sequel to Taxi.

In 2008 Ulrik Imtiaz Rolfsen directed the Norwegian movie The Last Joint Venture (Den Siste Revejakta), based on Ingvar Ambjørnsen's cult novel of the same name. The movie, set in 1979, is a comedy/drama portraying two friends in Oslo who fight hard drugs, while dealing weed - trying to remain hippies as the 80's comes charging. Main cast was Kristoffer Joner, Kåre Conradi and Nicolay Cleve Broch.

In 2007 Ulrik Imtiaz Rolfsen helmed Varg Veum - Bitter Flowers (Bitre Blomster), a Norwegian crime thriller that was released theatrically in Norway in August 2007. It is the first in a series of twelve films about the private detective Varg Veum financed by German TV station ARD Degeto, based on the books by Gunnar Staalesen. Portraying Varg Veum was actor Trond Espen Seim.

Rolfsen produced and directed the documentary Voluntarily Forced (2014). In it Rolfsen studies the collision between Norwegian, promiscuous, liberal culture versus traditional Pakistani clan culture practicing arranged and forced marriages, and the documentary caused a nationwide discussion.

Rolfsen has earlier made a number of commercials and music videos.

=== The Supreme Court-case ===
On June 8, 2015, while producing and directing Recruiting For Jihad, a documentary about Norwegian radicalized Islamists, Norwegian Police Security Service (PST) raided Rolfsen's house and seized 8 hours of raw documentary footage without a court warrant. Several Norwegian press associations reacted, claiming protection of journalistic sources. Supported by The Association of Norwegian Editors, Rolfsen challenged the PST, but lost in two lower levels of the Norwegian judicial system, before winning the case in The Supreme Court of Norway in November 2015. On April 4, 2016 this verdict was awarded the Columbia Global Freedom of Expression Prize in 2015. The documentary was planned to air in 2015, but due to the seizure and subsequent trial Rolfsen was forced to halt the production. The film was released April 5, 2017 on NRK (Norwegian Broadcast Corporation). This version was shown in Toronto during HotDocs in April 2017, while an extended international version had its international premiere at AFI Docs in Washington DC in June 2017.
