= Bitter Flowers (2007 film) =

- Teaser Poster for the Varg Veum film series
- Norwegian: Varg Veum: Bitre Blomster
- Directed by: Ulrik Imtiaz Rolfsen
- Screenplay by: Thomas Moldestad
- Based on: Bitter Flowers by Gunnar Staalesen
- Produced by: Jonas Allen; Peter Bose
- Starring: Trond Espen Seim; Kathrine Fagerland; Bjørn Floberg
- Cinematography: Gaute Gunnari
- Edited by: Wibecke Rønseth; Erik Thv. Aster
- Music by: Ginge
- Release date: 28 September 2007
- Running time: 95 minutes
- Country: Norway
- Language: Norwegian / English
- Box office: $4.8 million

Bitter Flowers (Norwegian: Varg Veum: Bitre Blomster) is 2007 Norwegian crime thriller film directed by Ulrik Imtiaz Rolfsen. It is the first in a series of twelve films about the private detective Varg Veum, based on the books by Gunnar Staalesen. The film stars Trond Espen Seim as Veum.

== Plot ==
A man vanishes without a trace. His lover, a married, successful politician, discreetly contacts private investigator Varg Veum for assistance. Varg finds her lover murdered, and the politician's husband is arrested for the murder. However, Varg accuses the police of miscarriage of justice and gets involved in an international murder case branching out far beyond Norwegian borders, with adversaries who will stop at nothing.

== Cast ==
- Trond Espen Seim as Varg Veum
- Kathrine Fagerland as Anna Keilhaug
- Bjørn Floberg as Hamre
- Endre Hellestveit as Isachsen
- Anders Dale as Odin
- Øyvind Gran as Trygve
- Ove Andreassen as Monrad
- Per Jansen as Harald
- Trine Wiggen as Vibeke
- Håvard Bakke as Bård
- Nicholas Hope as Warren Donaldson

== Reception ==
The film was reviewed with a "die throw" of 4 in VG, Dagsavisen, Bergens Tidende, Bergensavisen, Adresseavisen. Stavanger Aftenblad, Klassekampen, Fædrelandsvennen and Fredriksstad Blad; 3 in Dagbladet and Hamar Arbeiderblad; and 2 in Aftenposten, Dagens Næringsliv, which gave no "die throw," called the main character "dime-a-dozen" and the plot somewhat cliché.
