= Endre Lund Eriksen =

Norwegian author and politician (born 1977)

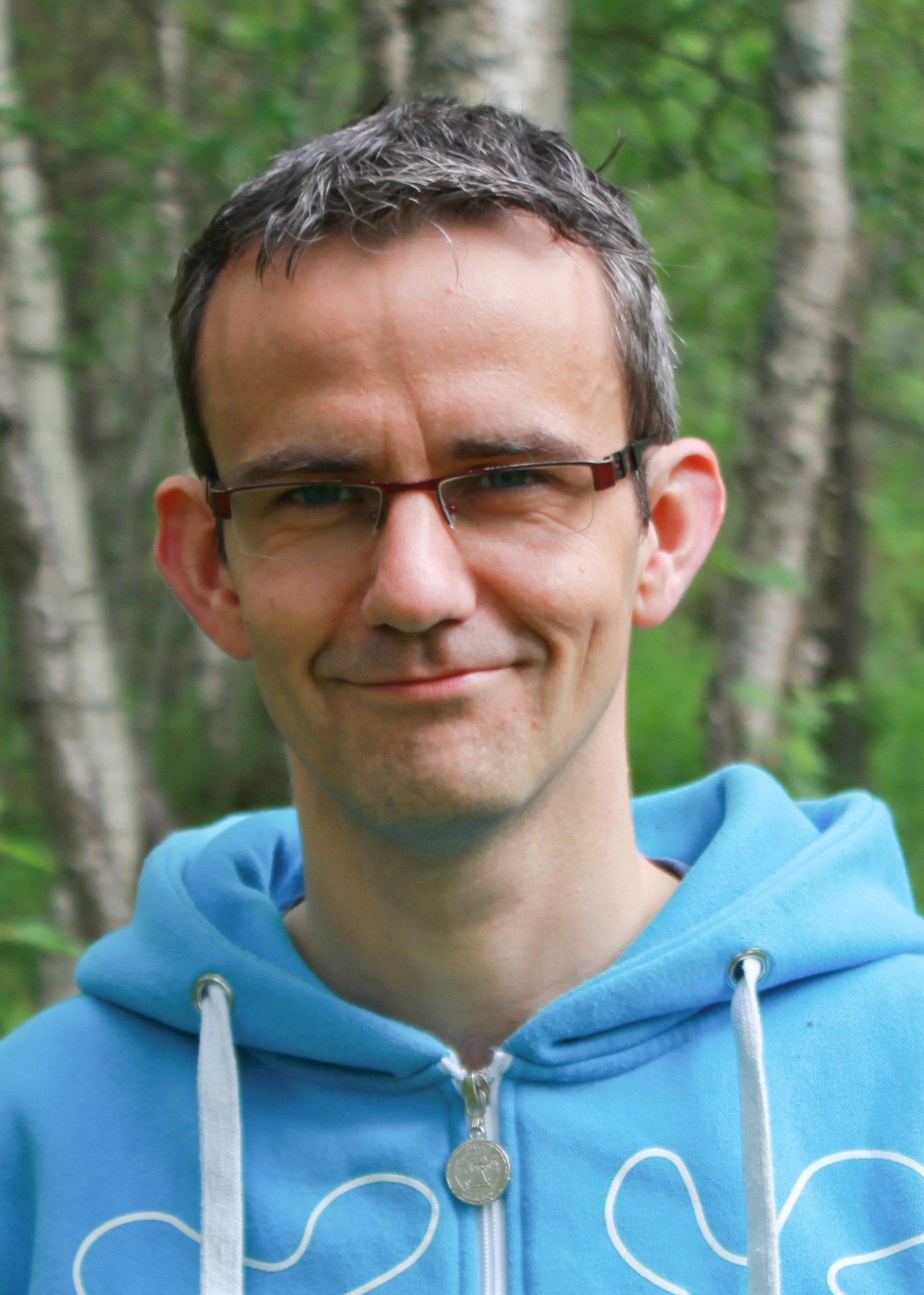
- Born: 10 February 1977 (age 49); Bodø, Norway
- Occupation: Author
- Writing career
- Period: 2002–present
- Genres: Children's books, novels
- Website: www.lunderiksen.no

Endre Lund Eriksen (born 10 February 1977) is a Norwegian author and politician.

Lund Eriksen was active in Socialist Youth in his teenage years, and as a member of the Norwegian Socialist Left Party (SV) in Nordland, Eriksen was a deputy in the Storting Parliament from 1997 to 2001. In March 2015 he was elected to the SV central board with a special responsibility to follow up on the project "Yes to Northern Norway."

He made his book debut as an author in 2002, with the children's book Pitbull-Terje går amok (lit. Pitbull-Terje runs amok). The book received the Kulturdepartementets priser for barne- og ungdomslitteratur, and was made into a film, Pitbullterje (2005), with manuscript by Lund Eriksen. The film won the 2006 Amanda Award for Best Children and Youth Film.

Lund Eriksen has written three more books about Pitbull-Terje: Pitbull-Terje og kampen mot barnevernet (Pitbull-Terje and the fight against the Child Welfare service) (2006), that won the 2006 Arks barnebokpris, Pitbull-Terje blir ond (Pitbull-Terje turns evil) (2007), that won the 2008 UPrisen, and Pitbull-Terje på sporet av den tapte far (Pitbull-Terje and the hunt for the lost father) (2010).

Lund Eriksen has received several awards for his books, that have been translated to 11 languages including Bulgarian, Danish, Dutch, French, German, Sami, and Swedish.

== Notable works ==
- 2002: Pitbull-Terje går amok (Pitbull-Terje goes wild)

- German translation: — (2004). Beste Freunde, kapiert! (in German). Dressler. ISBN 978-3-7915-2852-6.

- 2003: Ingen kan stoppe meg no (No one can stop me now)
- 2004: JAFS. Flukten fra Villmarka Zoo (JAFS: The escape from the wild Zoo)
- 2005: Det tar ikke slutt (It doesn't end)
- 2005: Pelle blir rappa (Pelle is stolen)
- 2006: Pitbull-Terje og kampen mot barnevernet (Pitbull-Terje and the fight against the Child Welfare service)
- 2007: Pitbull-Terje blir ond (Pitbull-Terje turns evil)

- German translation: — (2007). Beste Freunde oder der ganz normale Wahnsinn (in German). Dressler. ISBN 978-3-7915-2853-3.

- 2008: En terrorist i senga (A terrorist in the bed)
- 2009: Førstemann som pissa på månen (First man that peed on the moon)

- Danish translation: — (2014). Den første mand som tissede på månen (in Danish). Turbine. ISBN 978-87-7141-569-8.

- 2010: Super

- Dutch translation: — (8 April 2011). Super (in Dutch). Unieboek & Het Spectrum. ISBN 978-90-00-30040-2.

- 2010: Pitbull-Terje på sporet av den tapte far (Pitbull-Terje and the hunt for the lost father)
- 2010: Alvin Pang og en søster for mye (Alvin Pang and one too much of a sister)
- 2010: Alvin Pang og verdens beste bursdag (Alvin Pang and the world's best birthday)

- Danish translation: — (2014). Alvin Pang og verdens bedste fødselsdag (in Danish). Turbine. ISBN 978-87-7141-535-3.

- 2011: Alvin Pang og hva foreldre gjør når du sover (Alvin Pang and what your parents do when you're sleeping)
- 2011: Evens hage (Evan's garden)
- 2011: Monstrene i Dunderly (The Monsters in Dunderly)
- 2011: Farvel Miss Nice Girl (Goodbye Miss Nice Girl)

- Danish translation: — (17 August 2015). Farvel Miss Nice Girl (in Danish). Gyldendal. ISBN 978-87-02-18805-9.

- 2011: Nissefella (Santa Fella)
- 2011: Bulder – en bruksanvisning (Rushing – an instruction manual)
- 2012: Herlige farligheter (Lovely dangerous devices)
- 2012: Moi og uhyret
- 2012: Den sommeren pappa ble homo (That Summer my Daddy was Gay)

- Dutch translation: — (3 July 2014). De zomer waarin mijn vader homo werd (in Dutch). Unieboek & Het Spectrum. ISBN 978-90-00-32957-1.
- French translation: — (2014). L'été où papa est devenu gay (in French). T. Magnier. ISBN 978-2-36474-517-9.

- 2012: Monstervenn (The Monster Friend)
- 2012: Moi om våren (Me and the Monster)
- 2013: Alvin Pang på rømmen (Alvin Pang on The Run)
- 2014: Nattdyr (Animals at Night)
- 2014: Rudy og lynmonsteret (Rudy and the Lightning Monster)
- 2015: Raggmonsteret (The Rag Monster)
- 2016: Dunder

== Awards ==
- 2000: 3rd prize in NRK's drama competition for Strandet i paradis (Stranded in Paradise)
- 2002: Kulturdepartementets priser for barne- og ungdomslitteratur for Pitbull-Terje går amok
- 2002: Aschehougs debutantstipend for Pitbull-Terje går amok (Note: "Litteraturpriser til Nesbø, Hagerup og Eriksen". Bergens Tidende.)
- 2003: Havmannprisen for Ingen kan stoppe meg no
- 2006: Arks barnebokpris for Pitbull-Terje og kampen mot barnevernet
- 2008: UPrisen for Pitbull-Terje blir ond
- 2008: Arks barnebokpris for En terrorist i senga
- 2009: Skolebibliotekarforeningens litteraturpris for his collected oeuvre
- 2012: Nordland fylkes kulturpris for his authorship
- 2012: Teskjekjerringprisen
