= Narvik (film) =

2022 Norwegian historical drama film

- Directed by: Erik Skjoldbjaerg
- Screenplay by: Cristoph Grøndahl; Live Bonnevie (story); Erik Skjoldbaerg (story); Sebastian Torngren Wartin (story)
- Produced by: Aage Aaberge; Live Bonnevie
- Starring: Kristine Hartgen; Carl Martin Eggesbø; Cristoph Gelfert Mathiesen; Henrik Mestad
- Cinematography: John-Erling Holmenes Fredriksen
- Edited by: Martin Stoltz
- Music by: Christine Hals
- Production company: Nordisk Film
- Distributed by: Netflix Streaming Services
- Release dates: 25 December 2022 (Norway); 23 January 2023 (Netflix)
- Running time: 107 minutes
- Country: Norway
- Languages: Norwegian; German; English; French

Narvik (Norwegian: Kampen om Narvik lit. 'The Battle for Narvik') is a Norwegian historical film depicting the Battles of Narvik from 9 April to 8 June 1940. Directed by Erik Skjoldbjærg and made by Nordisk Film, it stars Kristine Hartgen, Carl Martin Eggesbø, Cristoph Gelfert Mathiesen and Henrik Mestad. The film premiered in Norway in December 2022 and was released worldwide (except in Norway) on Netflix in January 2023.

== Background ==
The German invasion of Norway began in April 1940 with coordinated landings across Norway. The invasion was largely successful, but ran into its greatest resistance in the far north. The town of Narvik, a port town on the Atlantic, was strategically important because it shipped iron ore from neutral Sweden to Germany. The Nazis wanted to secure these exports, while the Allies wished to keep Narvik under control of the Norwegian government, or at least sabotage its use as a port. Two months of warfare between the Allies and the Germans would ensue.

== Plot ==
On 8 April 1940, a group of Norwegian soldiers arrive at Narvik by ship. One of them, Corporal Gunnar Tofte is given permission to go home to see his son Ole on his birthday. He meets his wife Ingrid, who is a waitress at the town's hotel, during a meeting between German and British representatives to discuss working relations between the warring states, who both need the iron ore mined in Kiruna and Gällivare, Sweden and brought to this Norwegian town by the ore railway for export.

After spending the night with his family, Gunnar awakes before dawn as German soldiers land in Narvik. After a brief standoff, the Norwegian commander orders his troops to withdraw. They march out to a railroad bridge in the mountains, which their new commander intends to dynamite to prevent its use by the Germans. After phoning his father, Aslak, on the dynamite's whereabouts, Gunnar is told that his wife and child are on a train heading towards the bridge. Shortly afterwards, a group of civilians, including Ingrid and Ole, appear and cross just as German soldiers arrive. A firefight ensues and the bridge is blown up. Gunnar is captured, while Ingrid and Ole, who decided to watch, are taken back to town.

The Germans take over the hotel, enlist Ingrid as a translator since she speaks German and search for the British consul, Ross, whom Ingrid hides in a mountain cabin. The German consul Fritz Wussow asks Ingrid to assist him in negotiations with the hostile mayor Theodor Broch. Ingrid in turn asks Wussow to help get Gunnar released. After Ross calls on Ingrid to visit, he convinces her to steal military plans from Wussow by indirectly threatening her. While Ingrid is at the hotel, the British navy enters the harbor and starts firing on the German destroyers there, sending Ingrid, Ole, Aslak and other civilians to hide in a basement. After the engagement, all German destroyers are sunk, but no British soldiers have landed. In the chaos, Ingrid manages to steal a map of German artillery emplacements in town and then gives it to Ross, who sends the information to the British warships. As she returns, the British start bombarding the town, killing Aslak and injuring Ole when a shell lands on their house.

Four weeks later, the Germans have fortified the area around Narvik. In the mountains, Gunnar and other POWs are forced to move supplies for the Germans when they are attacked by French and Norwegian soldiers. Gunnar is rescued and returns to combat, intent on returning to Narvik after being told of his father's death. While hiding in a bunker, Ole suffers an infection from his prior injury as Ingrid braves shellfire to bring him to the hotel and betrays Ross whereabouts to Wussow in exchange for Ole receiving medical treatment, after which the German doctor removes a piece of shrapnel near his lung.

Two weeks later, Allied forces enter Narvik. Gunnar and others overcome the German defenses and destroy a large artillery piece firing at the British warships. As the Germans prepare to withdraw, Wussow asks Ingrid to accompany him to Berlin but she declines. He then incorrectly tells her that Gunnar was killed. After taking advice from her boss Polly, who warns her that her collaboration with the Germans is known in the town, Ingrid decides to leave Narvik with Ole.

Gunnar and other soldiers return to Narvik to cheering crowds but is told that his wife was a collaborator. Upon returning to his damaged house, he is reunited with Ingrid and Ole. Ingrid explains her actions to Gunnar, who angrily calls her a traitor as German planes bomb Narvik. Gunnar rushes out into the street to see a comrade getting killed. While hearing their commander call for resistance, Gunnar watches Ingrid and Ole leave. They board a fishing boat with other civilians who scorn them for her collaboration before they are joined by Gunnar and escape Narvik before the Germans recapture the city.

== Cast ==
- Kristine Hartgen as Ingrid Tofte
- Carl Martin Eggesbø as Corporal Gunnar Tofte
- Cristoph Gelfert Mathiesen as Ole Tofte
- Henrik Mestad as Major Sigurd Omdal
- Mathilde Holtedahl Cuhra as Bjørg
- Stig Henrik Hoff as Aslak Tofte
- Emil Johnsen as Theodor Broch
- Kari Bremnes as Petra 'Polly' Gleditsch
- Cristoph Bach as Consul Fritz Wussow
- Billy Campbell as George L.D. Gibbs
- Holger Handtke as General Eduard Dietl
- Magnus Dugdale as Giles Romilly
- Edvard Lie Aalstad as Private Magne Hansen
- Øyvind Trøite as Private Olav Præstnes
- Torfinn Nag as Colonel Konrad Sundlo

== Production ==
Aage Aaberge of Nordisk Films signed a deal to make a film depicting the events at Narvik, in 2016.

== Release ==
The film had a delayed release due to the COVID-19 pandemic. It had its Norwegian premiere on 25 December 2022, prior to its worldwide Netflix release. It passed 400,000 cinema visits to become the most watched Norwegian cinema film from 2022. The film was released in 86 territories by Netflix in January 2023.

== Reception ==
On the review aggregator website Rotten Tomatoes, Narvik holds an approval rating of 100% based on 5 reviews. The film received some criticism for its thin characterisation. Praise came for the cinematography and acting, whilst drawing parallels with events in Ukraine from 2022 onwards.
