= Erik Skjoldbjærg =

Norwegian film director

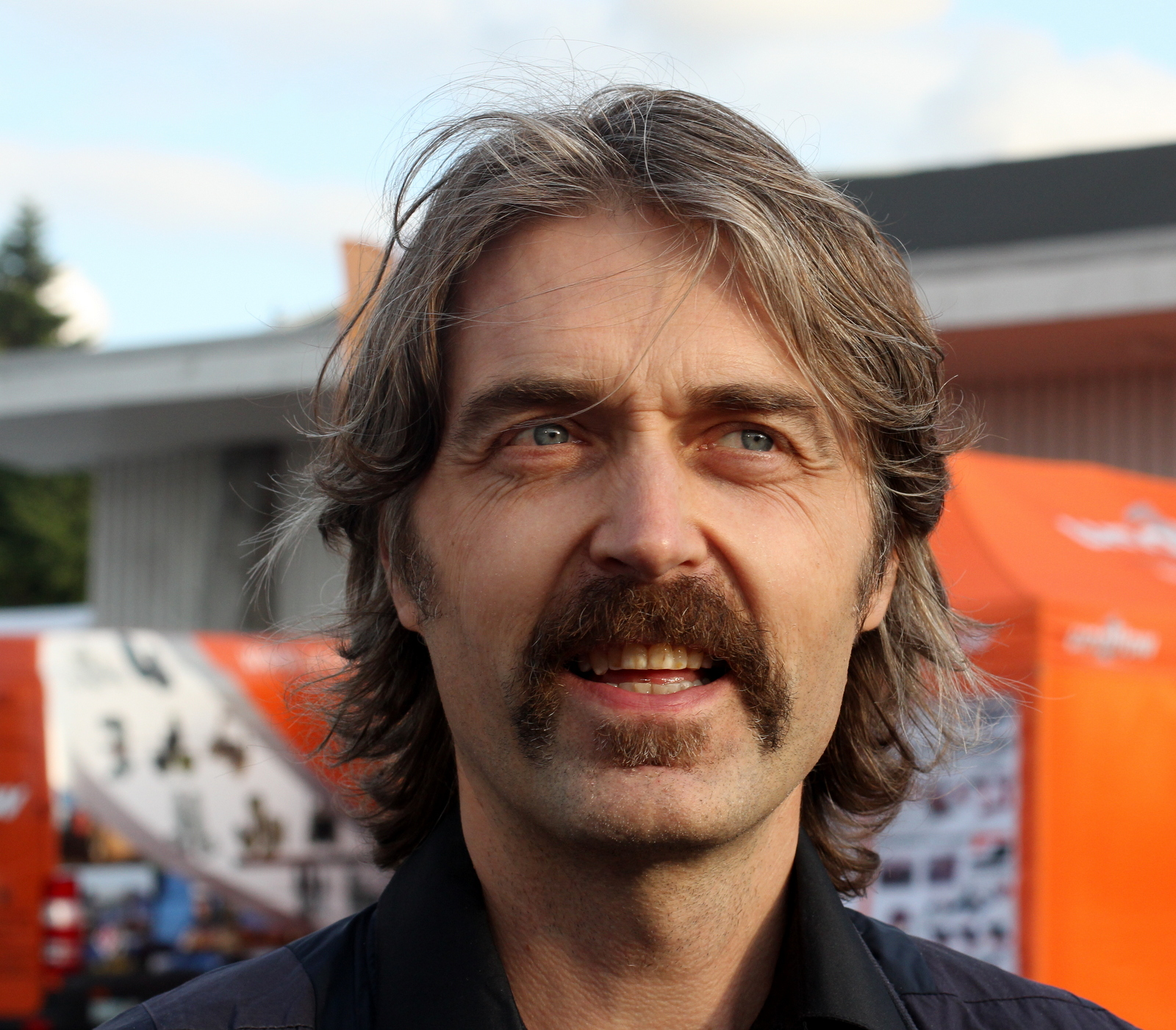
- Erik Skjoldbjærg, 2013
- Born: December 14, 1964 (age 61); Tromsø, Norway
- Occupations: Director and writer
- Notable work: Insomnia, Narvik

Erik Skjoldbjærg (born December 14, 1964) is a Norwegian director and writer best known for co-writing and directing the films Insomnia and Narvik. His film Pioneer was selected to be screened in the Special Presentation section at the 2013 Toronto International Film Festival.

== Filmography ==
=== As director ===
- Vinterveien (Near Winter, short film, 1993, also wrote)
- Close to Home (short film, 1994, also wrote)
- Spor (1996, also wrote)
- Insomnia (1997, also wrote)
- Prozac Nation (2001)
- Skolen (TV series, unknown episodes, 2004)
- En folkefiende (An Enemy of the People, 2005, also wrote)
- Størst av alt (TV series, 3 episodes, 2006)
- Nokas (2010)
- Pionér (Pioneer, 2013, also wrote)
- Pyromaniac (2016)
- Forsvinningen - Lørenskog 31. oktober 2018 (The Lørenskog Disappearance, miniseries, 3 episodes, 2022)
- Narvik (2022)

=== As writer ===
- Insomnia (2002)
- Occupied (2015–20)
