= Pioneer (film) =

2013 Norwegian thriller film

- Film poster
- Directed by: Erik Skjoldbjærg
- Written by: Erik Skjoldbjærg
- Starring: Aksel Hennie; Stephen Lang; Wes Bentley; Ane Dahl Torp; Stephanie Sigman; Jonathan LaPaglia; Jørgen Langhelle; Eirik Stubø; André Eriksen; David A. Jørgensen; Endre Hellestveit
- Cinematography: Jallo Faber
- Edited by: Frida Eggum Michaelsen; Jonas Aaro
- Music by: Air
- Production companies: Film i Väst; Garagefilm International; Les Films d'Antoine; Pandora Filmproduktion
- Distributed by: Nordisk Film
- Release date: 30 August 2013
- Running time: 111 minutes
- Countries: Norway; France; Germany; Sweden; Iceland
- Languages: Norwegian; English

Pioneer (Norwegian: Pionér) is a 2013 Norwegian thriller film directed by Erik Skjoldbjærg. It was released on 30 August, followed by a screening in the Special Presentation section at the 2013 Toronto International Film Festival.

== Synopsis ==
Petter is a commercial offshore diver in the North Sea during the 1980s. Norway is at the beginning of its program for oil extraction. Petter and his brother Knut have key roles in laying the first petroleum pipe in the North Sea. Norwegians and Americans are cooperating in diving deeper than anyone previously has done, to prepare for the installation of a gas pipeline. Petter experiences a tragic accident during a test dive. When he later tries to find out what really happened, he finds that the authorities and his colleagues are trying to cover up the matter.

== Cast ==
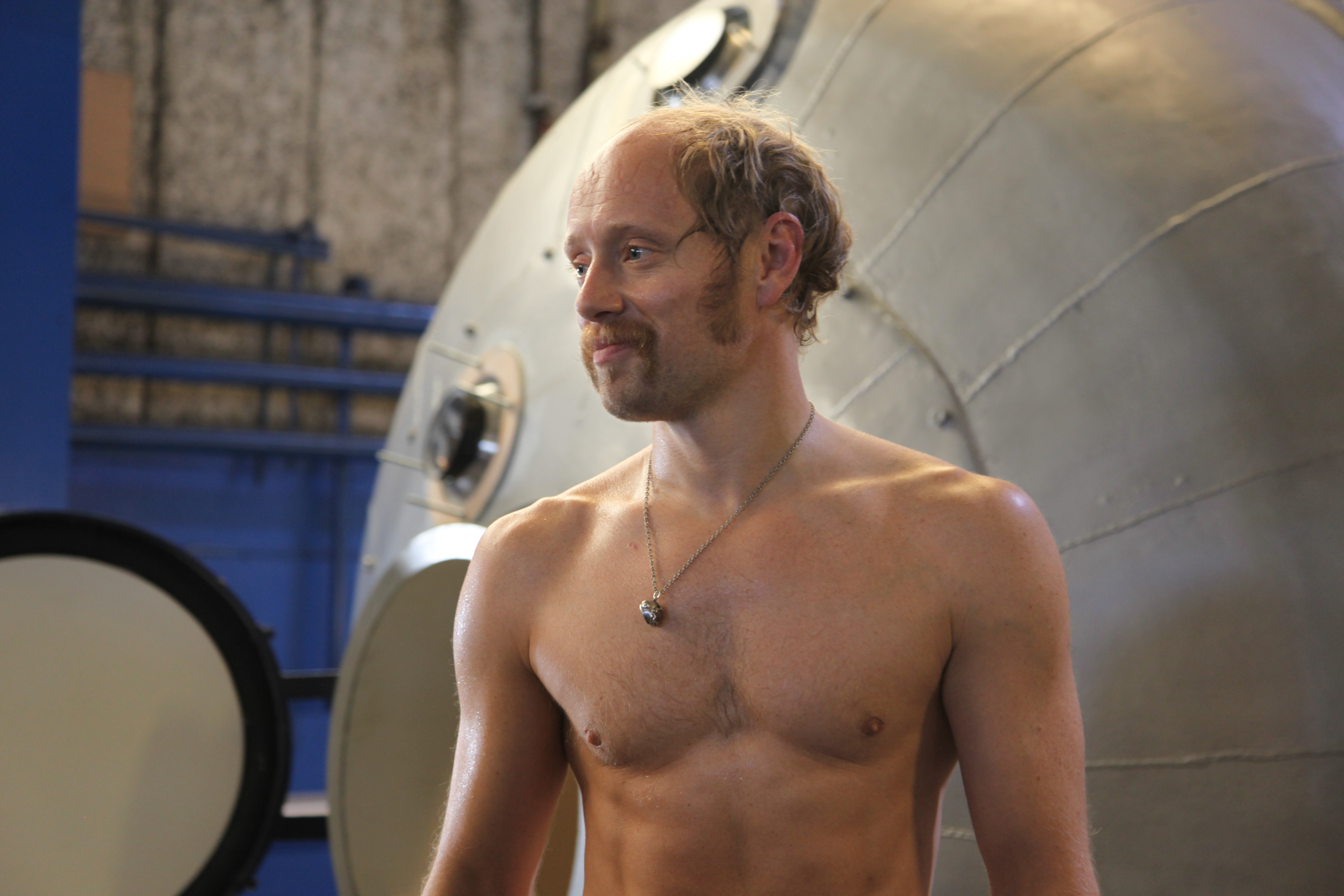
Aksel Hennie during the production of Pioneer.

- Aksel Hennie as Petter Jensen
- Wes Bentley as Mike
- Stephen Lang as John Ferris
- Jonathan LaPaglia as Ronald McDermott
- Stephanie Sigman as Maria Salazar
- Jørgen Langhelle as Leif Lindberg
- Ane Dahl Torp as Pia
- André Eriksen as Knut Jensen
- Arne Lindtner Næss as Minister
- Eirik Stubø as Ivar Jeger
- Endre Hellestveit as Trond
- Janne Heltberg as Trude Svendsen
- Kent Albinsson as Jens Roger Hjort

== Reception ==
On Rotten Tomatoes, the film has an approval rating of 55% based on 44 reviews, with an average rating of 5.6/10. The website's critics consensus reads: "Pioneer boasts strong acting and a throwback conspiracy thriller vibe, but fails to take it far enough, and is very slow about not getting there." On Metacritic, the film has a score of 58 out of 100, based on reviews from 13 critics.

== English-language remake ==
As of April 2014, Smokehouse Pictures, operated by George Clooney and Grant Heslov, were reported to be working on an English-language remake of the film.

== See also ==
- The drilling rig Byford Dolphin, where a real-life decompression chamber accident in Norway resulted in the death of a number of divers in 1983.
