= Byttinger =

- Directed by: Sigve Endresen
- Written by: Sigve Endresen; Kenny Sanders
- Starring: Bjarte Hjelmeland; Stig Henrik Hoff; Mona Hofland; Hallvard Holmen
- Release date: 26 December 1991
- Running time: 84 minutes
- Country: Norway
- Language: Norwegian

Byttinger (English: Changelings) is a 1991 Norwegian drama film directed by Sigve Endresen, starring Bjarte Hjelmeland and Stig Henrik Hoff. A group of seven inner-city youths are given the choice between prison and a rehabilitation camp in the countryside. The two social workers who follow them there believe that the fresh air and beautiful scenery will have a positive influence on them. During an excursion to a glacier the group gets trapped, and the kids have to use all their street smarts to get out.
