= Sigve Endresen =

Norwegian film producer and director

- Born: November 12, 1953 (age 72); Stavanger, Norway
- Occupations: Film producer and director

Sigve Endresen (born November 12, 1953, in Stavanger) is a producer and director of documentary films.

== Career ==
In 1998, Sigve Endresen received the Aamot statuette. In 2009, Sigve Endresen and Brede Hovland jointly received the Kanon Award in the Best Producer category for their work on the film North . In 2021, he co-directed the documentary Generasjon Utøya which focused on the experiences of survivors of the Utøya massacre. The film was awarded the Human prize and was nominated for the Amanda award 2021 in the category best Norwegian cinema film and best documentary film.

Endresen founded the production company Motlys, which has been operational for over four decades.

== Partial filmography ==
- 1986: Mama Tumaini
- 1989: For harde livet
- 1991: Byttinger
- 1995: Store gutter gråter ikke
- 1998: Leve blant løver
- 2002: Vektløs
- 2005: Alt for Norge
- 2009: North (producer)
- 2011: Jeg reiser alene (producer)
- 2011: Oslo, 31. august (producer)
- 2014: Blind
- 2021: Generasjon Utøya (director and producer)
