= Holger Handtke =

German television actor (born 1968)

Holger Handtke (born 1968) is a German television actor.

== Filmography ==
=== Film ===
- Keep on Running (1991) - Ludwig
- Enemy at the Gates (2001) - Paulus' Aide de Camp
- Hart's War (2002) - Maj. Johann Wirtz
- Wir (We, 2003) - Supervisor
- Love in Thoughts (2004) - Wieland
- Die Hitlerkantate (2005) - Regisseur
- Franziska Spiegel, Eine Erinnerung (2005, Short) - Gottfried Spiegel
- Baruto no Gakuen (2006) - Eduard Boese
- 1½ Knights: In Search of the Ravishing Princess Herzelinde (2008)
- Life Is Too Long (2010)
- Tom Sawyer (2011) - Staatsanwalt
- Hotel Lux (2011) - Ribbentrop
- Bild von ihr (2011) - Jonathan
- Two Lives (2012) - German Interrogator
- Füße im Mund (2012) - Bert
- The Monuments Men (2014) - Colonel Wegner
- Amour fou (2014) - Arzt
- Alone in Berlin (2016) - Dollfuss
- The Silent Revolution (2018) - Polizeibeamter
- Der Überläufer (2020) - Soldat
- Narvik (2022)

=== TV movies ===
- SOKO Kitzbühel (2004-2006) - Dr. Nicolas Borowski / Norbert Schnitzler
- Unsolved (2006) - Frank Schubert
- Küstenwache (2006) - Michael Kortwich
- La Lance de la destinée (The Spear of Destiny, 2007) - Manfred
- Löwenzahn (2012-2019) - Heinz Kluthe / Horst Kluthe

And many second-roles in German TV series like Derrick, The Old Fox and others.
