= In the Dark (British TV series) =

- Genre: Crime drama
- Based on: In the Dark by Mark Billingham
- Written by: Danny Brocklehurst
- Directed by: Gilles Bannier; Ulrik Imtiaz Rolfsen
- Starring: MyAnna Buring; Ben Batt; David Leon; Jamie Sives; Clive Wood; Georgia Tennant; Matt King
- Composer: Neil Davidge
- Country of origin: United Kingdom
- Original language: English
- No. of series: 1
- No. of episodes: 4

Production
- Executive producer: Hilary Martin
- Producer: Hugh Warren
- Cinematography: Sam Care
- Running time: 58 minutes
- Production company: BBC Studios

Original release
- Network: BBC One
- Release: 11 July – 1 August 2017

In the Dark is a four-part British crime drama that premiered on BBC One from 11 July to 1 August 2017. The series is an adaptation of the Mark Billingham novels, Time of Death and In The Dark. It is written by Danny Brocklehurst and stars MyAnna Buring as detective Helen Weeks. Production and global distribution was handled by BBC Studios.

== Synopsis ==
In the Dark consists of two stories of two parts each centring around detective Helen Weeks. In the first story, Helen finds out that she is pregnant and becomes involved in a case in which the husband of her childhood best friend is accused of kidnapping two young girls. In the second story, a heavily pregnant Helen is pulled into the dark side of urban Manchester as she deals with an unexpected tragedy.

== Cast and characters ==
- MyAnna Buring as DI Helen Weeks of the Manchester Metropolitan Police.
- Ben Batt as DI Paul Hopkins, Helen's partner and fellow detective in the Greater Manchester Police.
- Emma Fryer as Linda Bates, the wife of Stephen Bates who is the main suspect in the abduction of two young girls.
- David Leon as DI Adam Perrin, a detective in the Manchester Metropolitan Police and Helen's former fling
- Pearce Quigley as Trevor Hare, the owner of a pub in Helen’s hometown of Polesford.
- Ashley Walters as DI Tim Cornish, a North Derbyshire Police officer leading the abduction case.
- Matt King as Phil Hendricks, a forensic scientist.
- Jamie Sives as DCI Jack Gosforth., Week's superior at the Manchester Metropolitan Police
- Georgia Tennant as Jenny, Helen's sister.
- Sinead Matthews as Paula Days, an old acquaintance from Helen's childhood.
- Clive Wood as Robert Weeks, Helen's father.
- Jessica Gunning as DC Sophie Carson, the North Derbyshire Police officer on the field in the abduction case.
- Kevin Sutton as Gavin Sweeney, Paula's husband.
- Tim McInnerny as Frank Linnell
- Eleni Foskett as Charli

== Episodes ==
No.	Title	Directed by	Written by	Original release date	UK viewers (millions)
1	"Time of Death: Part 1"	Gilles Bannier	Danny Brocklehurst	11 July 2017	7.96
Manchester-based DI Helen Weeks informs her boyfriend and fellow detective Paul that she is pregnant. While Paul is overjoyed by the news, Helen is apprehensive. Helen returns to her rural home town of Polesford, Derbyshire, after learning that the husband of her childhood best friend, Linda, has been arrested for the abduction of two young girls. Meanwhile, local DI Tim Cornish is under pressure to close the case and is keen to pin the crime on Linda's husband, Stephen.
2	"Time of Death: Part 2"	Gilles Bannier	Danny Brocklehurst	18 July 2017	6.71
Helen and Paul continue to have misapprehensions about the case, bolstered by the advice of their colleague Phil, an MPD coroner. As the evidence proving Stephen's innocence builds up, Helen is forced to confront a vicious crime from her past as well as troubles in her relationship with Paul, then a break in the case leads to a race against time to save the other kidnapped girl.
3	"In the Dark: Part 1"	Ulrik Imtiaz Rolfsen	Danny Brocklehurst	25 July 2017	6.41
As a 38-week pregnant Helen is about to take maternity leave, she is struck by a personal tragedy which threatens to upend her life. Meanwhile, a novice gang member finds himself in over his head after his initiation, and unknowingly connected to Helen.
4	"In the Dark: Part 2"	Ulrik Imtiaz Rolfsen	Danny Brocklehurst	1 August 2017	6.38
As she tries to reconcile the facts of her loss with her own doubts, Helen digs deeper into Manchester's criminal underworld, only to be hit with a betrayal she never saw coming.

== Production ==
Filming for the series began in April 2016 in Manchester and Marsden.

== Reception ==
The Daily Telegraph's Michael Hogan gave the first episode three stars out of five, noting that: "In the Dark did show promise and could yet come good. It was taut and tensely atmospheric with an intriguing premise which found its heroine caught in the middle between police and prime suspect."

Reviewing the first episode, The Guardian's Sam Wollaston concluded that: "In The Dark is by no means a trope-free zone...But once you have accepted that, it's a crisp opener (of four) – pacy, thoughtful and skilfully constructed, with multiple strands I am eager to see twisted together again."
