= Pitbullterje =

Pibullterje
- DVD cover
- Directed by: Arild Fröhlich
- Written by: Endre Lund Eriksen
- Based on: Pitbull-Terje by Endre Lund Eriksen
- Produced by: Finn Gjerdrum; Torleif Hauge; Stein B. Kvae
- Starring: Petrus A. Christensen; Jørgen Foss; Robert Lindahl Haug; Vetle Næss; Charlotte Brodde; Rosa E. Bye; Kristin Skogheim; Atle Antonsen; Andreas Cappelen
- Cinematography: Trond Høines
- Edited by: Vidar Flataukan
- Music by: Kåre Vestrheim
- Production companies: Paradox; Paradox Spillefilm
- Distributed by: Scanbox Norge
- Release date: 4 November 2005 (Norway)
- Running time: 90 minutes
- Country: Norway
- Language: Norwegian

Pitbullterje is a 2005 Norwegian comedy film, that is based on the book by Endre Lund Eriksen. It stars Petrus A. Christensen as the lead role as Jim, and also Jørgen Foss as Terje. It also stars Robert Lindahl Haug, Vetle Næss, Charlotte Brodde, Rosa E. Bye, Kristin Skogheim, Atle Antonsen and Andreas Cappelen.

== Plot ==
Jim is a 12-year-old outsider. He has a mother with anxiety and he lives a hard life. At school he is smallest in his class, and compelled to buy beer and smoke and have parties in his garage. Home is different: He's the father of the house, and takes care of his mother, who has isolated herself in bed with a video of the Moon landing on VHS. She's not going out of her house due to anxiety. One day Terje (an overweight boy who claims to own a pit bull) starts in his class. He gets excluded from the class society, but he considers Jim as his best friend making him choose between an outsider friend and his poor social status.

== Music ==
The song "Et Juleevangelium" is by the Norwegian group "Klovner i Kamp".
