= Gørild Mauseth =

Norwegian actress (born 1972)

- Born: April 24, 1972 (age 54); Kjøllefjord, Finnmark, Norway
- Occupation: Actress
- Years active: 1993 – present
- Spouse: Tommaso Mottola
- Awards: "Best Début" Amanda Award 1998: Brent av frost

Gørild Mauseth (born 24 April 1972) is a Norwegian actress. After graduating from the Norwegian National Academy of Theatre, she has worked at both Den Nationale Scene and Nationaltheatret (the National Theatre). She is best known for her movie and television roles, that include "Deadline Torp" (TV, 2005) and Når mørket er forbi (Passing Darkness, 2000). In 2001 she was named one of European films' Shooting Stars by the European Film Promotion.

Mauseth won the "Best Début" Amanda Award in 1998 for her role in the 1997 movie Brent av frost. A controversy erupted when the Norwegian Broadcasting Corporation (NRK) later showed the scene out of context and without permission. NRK was originally convicted for unauthorised use of the clip, then acquitted in a court of appeal as being within Norway's right to quote doctrine, but then finally convicted by the Supreme Court.

Mauseth is married to the Italian director and producer Tommaso Mottola, and the couple lived together in Rome, but then moved to the hamlet of Kjøllefjord in Northern Norway.

The couple together made the documentary Karenina & I showing the challenging process of Mauseth travelling across Russia with her son and husband to play Anna Karenina and learning russian in the process. It explores the process to understand the intentions of Tolstoy the author, and of the actress almost becoming the subject. This was also the debut of Gøril Mauseth as a film producer.

== Filmography ==
- Karenina & I (2017)
- Hjerte til hjerte - sesong 1 / episode 1 (2007)
- Deadline Torp (TV, 2005)
- Når nettene blir lange (2000)
- Når mørket er forbi (2000)
- Brent av frost (1997)
- Black & Decker (1996)
- Telegrafisten (1993)
