= Knut Erik Jensen =

Norwegian film director (born 1940)

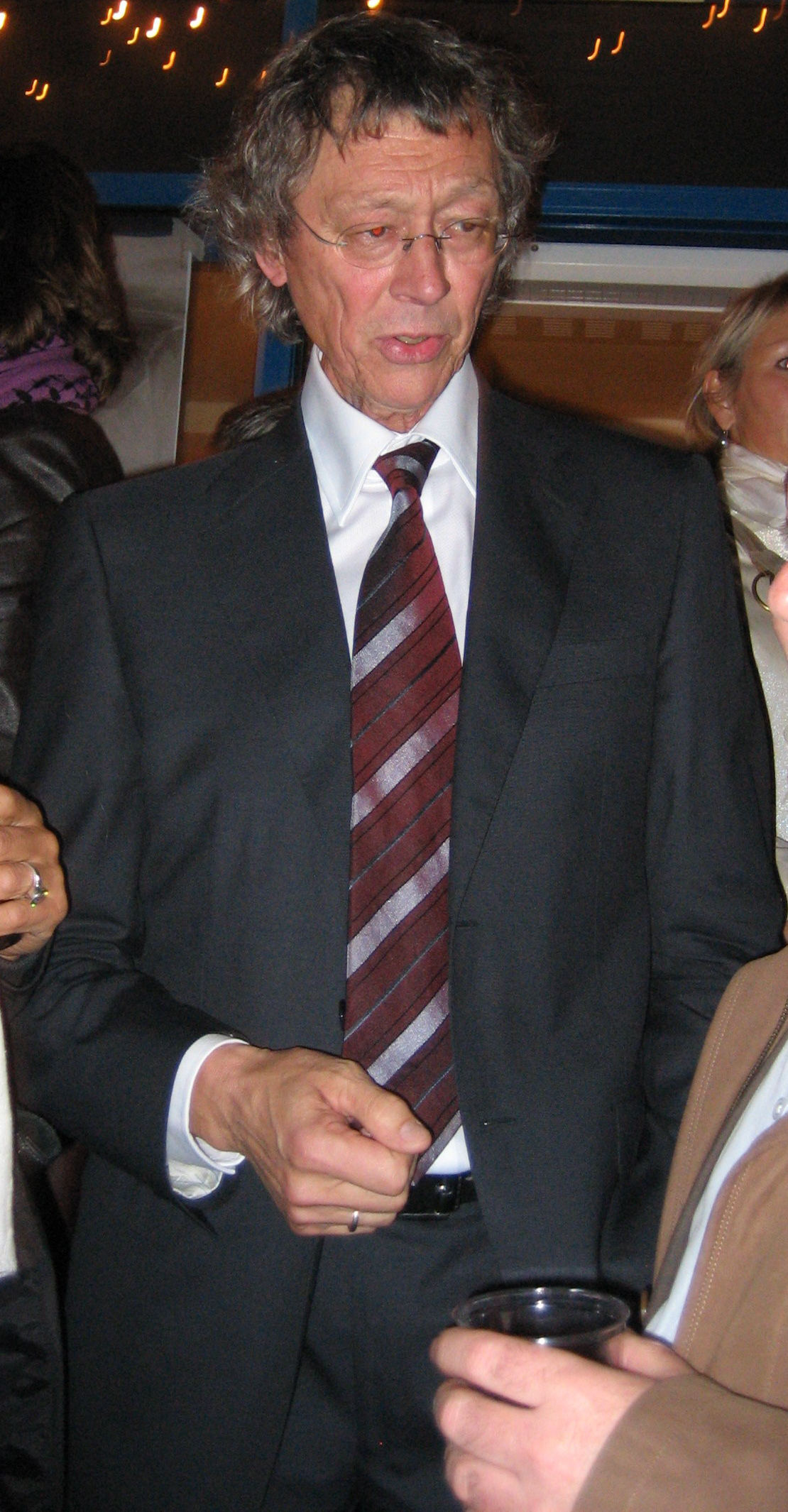
- Knut Erik Jensen at the première of Iskyss in Honningsvåg, 2008
- Born: 8 October 1940 (age 85); Honningsvåg, Norway
- Awards: Royal Norwegian Order of St. Olav

Knut Erik Jensen (born 8 October 1940 in Honningsvåg, Finnmark) is a Norwegian film director, best known for his documentary Cool and Crazy.

== Biography ==
After studying French, Russian and history, Jensen attended the London Film School. In 1978, he joined the Norwegian Broadcasting Corporation (NRK), and has since made documentaries and short films for NRK as well as independently. He is known for the documentary Cool and Crazy. Jensen has also directed three feature films: Stella Polaris (1993), Burnt by Frost (1997) and Passing Darkness (2000).

At the 2001 Amanda Awards, Jensen's documentary Heftig og begeistret won both Best Film (Årets norske kinofilm) and Best Documentary (Årets dokumentarfilm).

In 2008 Jensen was made a Knight, First Class of the Royal Norwegian Order of St. Olav.
