= Ginge Anvik =

Norwegian composer

Jan Inge “Ginge” Berentsen Anvik (born 25 October 1970, Kobe, Japan) is a Norwegian composer, known for his film scores. He is often credited as Ginge.

Ginge's film composer debut was the comedy Tommys Inferno from 2005. His next project was The Bothersome Man of 2006, and after that he has written the score for several titles in the Varg Veum series (2007–2011), among other films.
