= Bjørn Sundquist =

Norwegian actor (born 1948)

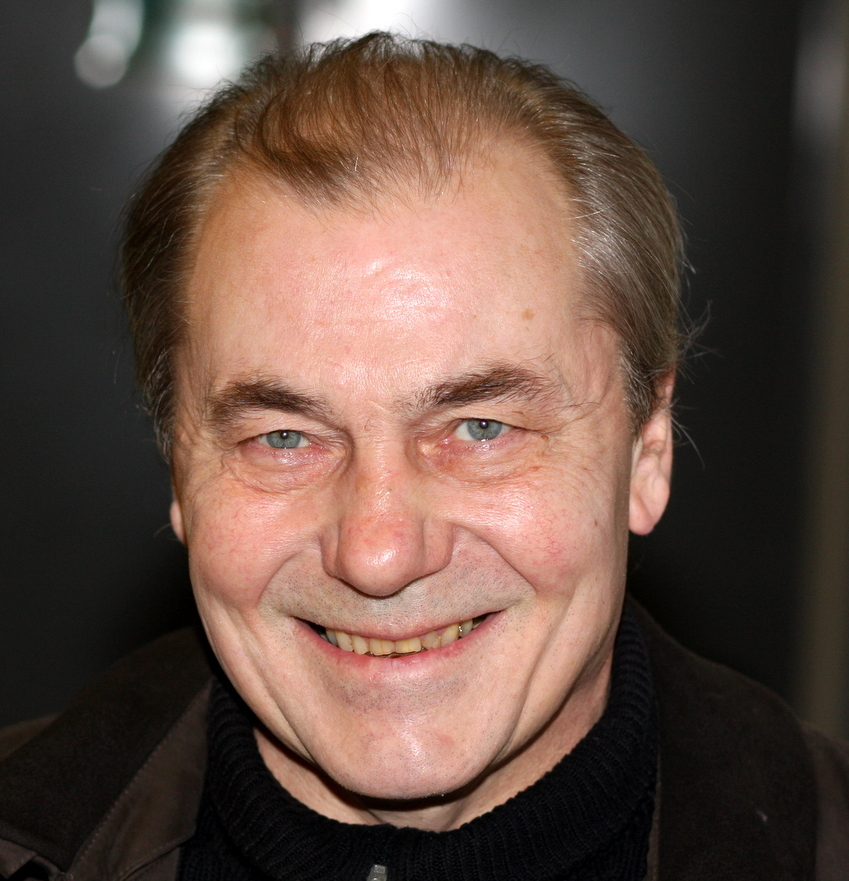
- Sundquist in 2010
- Born: Bjørn Richard Sundquist; 16 June 1948 (age 78); Hammerfest, Norway
- Occupation: Actor

Bjørn Richard Sundquist (born 16 June 1948) is a Norwegian television, theatre and film actor.

For many years he worked at Det Norske Teatret and Nationaltheateret in Oslo. Sundquist is especially famous for the roles as Merlin and Hamlet.

When he received the Honorary Amanda Award (Norway's answer to Oscar) in 2000, he became the youngest ever recipient of the greatest honor in Norwegian film. He was 52 at the time and only a few months younger than Liv Ullmann, who received the honorary award in 1992.

He is of Sami heritage on his mother's side (a minority originating mainly from the northern parts of the Scandinavian peninsula often referred to as Sápmi). He has had several TV-roles for both NRK, the biggest Norwegian television channel, and Norway's largest commercial channel, TV2. Sundquist has been awarded both a Gullruten and an Amanda award for his leading role as police chief Inspector Konrad Sejer in the television miniseries Sejer.

Sundquist is humorously said to appear in every single Norwegian movie, due to his popularity and versatility.

== Filmography ==
- The Battle of Oslo (2025)
- Mr. K (2024)
- Spermageddon (2024)
- Handling the Undead (2024)
- The Machinery (2020)
- Ragnarok (TV series) (2020)
- Hansel and Gretel: Witch Hunters (2013)
- Beyond the Border (2011)
- A Somewhat Gentle Man (2010)
- Tomme Tønner (2010)
- Karl III (2009) TV series
- Jernanger (2009)
- Dead Snow (2009) (a.k.a. Død Snø)
- Kautokeino-opprøret (2008)
- An Immortal Man (2006) as Reimann
- Sejer - Svarte sekunder (2006) (mini) TV miniseries
- Min misunnelige frisør (2004)
- The Homolulu Show (2004)
- Ørnen: En krimi-odyssé (2004) Tv series
- Asfaltevangeliet (2004)
- Sejer - Elskede Poona (2003) (mini) TV series
- The Pledge (2003)
- Loose Ends (2003)
- Jonny Vang (2003)
- Pelle politibil (2002)
- Sejer - Djevelen holder lyset (2002) TV miniseries
- Falling Sky (2002)
- Cowboys Don't Cry (2002)
- I Am Dina (2002)
- Endelig fredag (2002) TV series
- Nini (2001) TV series
- Amatørene (2001)
- Sleepwalker (2000)
- Evas øye (1999)
- Tørst - Framtidens forbrytelser (1999)
- Sejer - se deg ikke tilbake (1999) (mini) TV series
- 1732 Høtten (1998)
- Åpen post (1998) TV Series
- Thranes metode (1998)
- Tann for Tann (1998)
- Hammarkullen (1997) TV miniseries
- Salige er de som tørster (1997)
- Blind gudinne (1997) TV series
- Mendel (1997)
- Budbringeren (1997)
- Sagojoga minister (1997)
- Pust på meg! (1997)
- Søndagsengler (1996)
- Kjærlighetens kjøtere (1995)
- Pan (1995)
- Noe beroligende (1995)
- Ti kniver i hjertet (1994)
- Trollsyn (1994)
- Drømspel (1994)
- Brødrene Dal og legenden om Atlant-Is (1994) TV series
- Secondløitnanten (1993)
- Telegrafisten (1993)
- Pelle politibil (1993) TV series
- Svarte pantere (1992)
- Krigerens hjerte (1992)
- For dagene er onde (1991)
- Fedrelandet (1991) (mini) TV series
- Gränslots (1990)
- Haakon Haakonsen (1990)
- Døden på Oslo S (1990)
- Håndfull tid, En (1990)
- Dykket (1989)
- Sweetwater (1988)
- Etter Rubicon (1987)
- På stigende kurs (1987)
- Over grensen (1987), based on the Feldmann case
- Nattseilere (1986)
- Skal det vere ein dans? (1986) TV series
- Havlandet (1985)
- Gulag (1985) (TV)
- Galskap! (1985)
- Noe helt annet (1985)
- Høvdingen (1984)
- Spyship (1983) (mini) TV series
- Engler i sneen (1982)
- Kronprinsen (1979)
- Rallarblod (1979)
