= Uro (film) =

2006 Norwegian crime film

- Directed by: Stefan Faldbakken
- Written by: Harald Rosenløw Eeg
- Produced by: Knud Bjørne Larsen; Frida Ohrvik
- Starring: Nicolai Cleve Broch
- Cinematography: John Andreas Andersen
- Edited by: Vidar Flataukan
- Release date: 25 August 2006
- Running time: 104 minutes
- Country: Norway
- Language: Norwegian

Uro (Disturbance) is a 2006 Norwegian crime film starring Nicolai Cleve Broch and Ane Dahl Torp. It was directed by Stefan Faldbakken. It was screened in the Un Certain Regard section at the 2006 Cannes Film Festival.

== Plot ==
A former delinquent, Petter (HP) becomes a policeman. He is so involved when he is infiltrated that he sometimes forgets that he is a cop. His mission is to arrest a drug dealer Marco.

== Cast ==
- Nicolai Cleve Broch – Hans Petter
- Ane Dahl Torp – Mette
- Ahmed Zeyan – Marco
- Bjørn Floberg – Frank Hermansen
- Ingar Helge Gimle – Makker
- Eivind Sander – Henning
- Kim Sørensen – Anders
- Anne Krigsvoll – Mother
- Thorsten Flinck – Radovan
- Nicholas Hope – The dealer
- Bartek Kaminski – Vekteren
- Jørgen Emmanuel – Tim
- Anne Ryg – Avdelingsleder
- Heidi Gjermundsen – Lege (as Heidi Gjermundsen Broch)
- Marlene Vilberg – Danskens datter
