= Carl Sundberg =

American football coach

Coaching career (HC unless noted)
- 1906: Carthage

Head coaching record
- Overall: 3–2

Carl Sundberg was an American football coach. He served as the head football coach at Carthage College in Carthage, Illinois for one season, in 1906, compiling a record of 3–2.

== Head coaching record ==
Year	Team	Overall	Conference	Standing	Bowl/playoffs
Carthage Red Men (Independent) (1906)
1906	Carthage	3–2			
Carthage:		3–2			
Total:		3–2			
