= Varg Veum =

Fictional character created by Gunnar Staalesen

- Varg Veum character
- First appearance: Bukken til havresekken (The Buck to the Sack of Oats)
- Created by: Gunnar Staalesen
- Portrayed by: Trond Espen Seim

In-universe information
- Gender: Male
- Occupation: Private detective
- Nationality: Norwegian

Varg Veum is the central character in a series of crime novels, written by the Norwegian author Gunnar Staalesen, about a private detective who lives in Bergen, on the west coast of Norway. The books have been translated into several languages, including English, Spanish, German, and Swedish.

In the series there are 20 novels, two short story compilations and an additional short story, a collaboration (1993) with writer Fredrik Skagen, in which Veum meets a hero of Skagen's books, Morten Martens.

== Fictional biography ==
In the novels, Varg Veum was born on the 15th of October 1942. He grew up in a working class family in the Nordnes-neighborhood. After military service and a few years at sea, Veum studied law at the University of Oslo, but never completed his degree. He later trained as a social worker and was hired by the Child Welfare Services in Bergen in 1970.

Veum resigned from his position in 1975 after being charged with assault following a fight with a man who had abused a minor. His marriage also ended in divorce by this point. He established himself as a private investigator the same year and has an office in Strandkaien 2 in the city center of Bergen.

Veum's clients are usually private individuals who hire him to track down missing persons or expose affairs. His cases often have ties back to his time in the welfare services and he frequently uses his old contact network from there. Outside work, Veum has few friends and does not get to see his son as often as he likes. He is a heavy drinker, preferring Akvavit, and enjoys jazz music.

== List of novels ==
Cover of the first novel, 1977.

- Bukken til havresekken (The Buck to the Sack of Oats) (1977)
- Din, til døden (Yours Until Death) (1979) *
- Tornerose sov i hundre år (Sleeping Beauty Slept for One Hundred Years) (1980)
- Kvinnen i kjøleskapet (The Woman in the Fridge) (1981)
- I mørket er alle ulver grå (At Night All Wolves Are Grey) (1983) *
- Hekseringen (The Witches Circle) (includes 7 Varg Veum stories) (1985)
- Svarte får (Black Sheep) (1988) *
- Falne engler (Fallen Angels) (1989) *
- Bitre blomster (Bitter Flowers) (1991)
- Begravde hunder biter ikke (Buried Dogs Do Not Bite) (1993)
- Dødelig madonna (Lethal Madonna) (collaborative story with Fredrik Skagen) (1993)
- Skriften på veggen (The Writing on the Wall) (1995) *
- De døde har det godt (The Dead Have It Easy) (8 stories) (1996)
- Som i et speil (As If In A Mirror) (2002)
- Ansikt til ansikt (Face to Face) (2004)
- Dødens drabanter (The Consorts of Death) (2006) *
- Kalde hjerter (Cold Hearts) (2008) *
- Vi skal arve vinden (We Shall Inherit The Wind) (2010) *
- Der hvor roser aldri dør (Where Roses Never Die) (2012) *
- Ingen er så trygg i fare (Wolves in the Dark) (2014) *
- Storesøster (Big Sister) (2016) *
- Utenfor er hundene (Wolves at the Door) (2018) *
- Forfulgt av død (Pursued by Death) (2023) *

* Available in English.

== Films ==
=== Production history ===
In 2005 the Norwegian film production company SF Norge announced they would produce six films based on the books. The first film, Bitre Blomster (Bitter Flowers), opened in cinemas in Norway 28 September 2007. The film was directed by the Norwegian director Ulrik Imtiaz Rolfsen, who was previously known for the 2005 crime film Izzat. In film adaptations, Varg Veum is portrayed by Trond Espen Seim. Seim noticeably does not speak with a Bergen dialect, which caused attention before the release of the first film. Veums alcoholism is also toned down in the films and he appears much tougher than in the novels.

The second and third films, Tornerose (Sleeping Beauty) and Din til døden (Yours Until Death), were directed by Erik Richter Strand, a director who had won awards both in Europe and in the United States for his previous films. Both went direct to DVD. The fourth film, Falne engler (Fallen Angels), was directed by Morten Tyldum, who later became well known after his 2011 film direction of the Jo Nesbø novel Hodejegerne (Headhunters). It received a cinema release.

The fifth and sixth films, Kvinnen i kjøleskapet (The Woman in the Fridge) and Begravde hunder (Buried Dogs) respectively, were directed by Alexander Eik and released direct to DVD.

In 2009 it was announced that six more of the Varg Veum novels would be filmed. The second series films were released theatrically in Norway. All titles have been since then released both on DVD and on Blu-ray. The first of these was Skriften på veggen (The Writing on the Wall), directed by Stefan Faldbakken, a director of commercials. Svarte får (Black Sheep) was directed by the television director Stephan Apelgren, best known for directing many of the Swedish detective Kurt Wallander crime films. Apelgren continued directing duties on the next film in the series, Dødens drabanter (Consorts of Death).

The tenth film, I mørket er alle ulver grå (At Night All Wolves Are Grey), saw the return of director Alexander Eik. The eleventh film, De døde har det godt (The Dead Have It Easy), is the only one not directly based on a Varg Veum novel but rather combined elements from several short stories from the compilation of the same title. The last film, Kalde hjerter (Cold Hearts), was co-written and directed by lead actor Seim.

=== List of films ===
==== First series ====
- Bitre blomster (Bitter Flowers) (September 2007)
- Tornerose (Sleeping Beauty) (January 2008)
- Din til døden (Yours Until Death) (March 2008)
- Falne engler (Fallen Angels) (April 2008)
- Kvinnen i kjøleskapet (The Woman In The Fridge) (September 2008)
- Begravde hunder (Buried Dogs) (October 2008)

==== Second series ====
- Skriften på veggen (The Writing on the Wall) (November 2010)
- Svarte får (Black Sheep) (January 2011)
- Dødens drabanter (Consorts of Death) (April 2011)
- I mørket er alle ulver grå (At Night All Wolves Are Grey) (November 2011)
- De døde har det godt (The Dead Have It Easy) (January 2012)
- Kalde hjerter (Cold Hearts) (March 2012)
