= Magic Silver =

- Julenatt i Blåfjell
- Directed by: Katarina Launing; Roar Uthaug
- Written by: Gudny Ingebjørg Hagen; Thomas Moldestad
- Produced by: Jørgen Storm Rosenberg
- Starring: Ane Viola Semb; Johan Tinus Lindgren; Jan Gunnar Røise; Finn Schau
- Distributed by: Storm Rosenberg
- Release date: 2009
- Running time: 84 minutes
- Country: Norway
- Language: Norwegian
- Budget: NOK 21 million

Magic Silver (Norwegian: Julenatt i Blåfjell, "Christmas Night on Blue Mountain") is a Norwegian Christmas film from 2009 directed by Katarina Launing and Roar Uthaug.

The film is based on the television series Jul i Blåfjell ("Christmas on Blue Mountain") and Jul på Månetoppen] ("Christmas on Moon Peak"), but the film is set 100 years before this and portrays the first dramatic encounter between the red gnomes and the blue gnomes, as well as the pursuit of the magical blue silver. The film was followed by a sequel, Magic Silver II (Norwegian: Blåfjell 2: Jakten på det magiske horn, "Blue Mountain II: Search for the Magic Horn"), in 2011.

The film premiered on November 13, 2009, and was released on DVD on November 17, 2010. It was viewed in the theaters by nearly 370,000 people.

The film was nominated for the Amanda Award in the category children's and youth film in 2010.

== Cast ==
- Simen Bakken: Erke
- Sigve Bøe: Rimspå
- Nikoline Ursin Erichsen: Tufsa
- Johan Tinus Lindgren: Dreng
- Lillian Lydersen: Blåværskona
- Jan Gunnar Røise: Halvor
- Finn Schau: Fjellkonge
- Ane Viola Semb: Fjellrose
- Martin Slaatto: Vom
- Knut Walle: Nissefar
- Hanne Kogh: Sonja
