= Mother's Elling =

- Directed by: Eva Isaksen
- Starring: Per Christian Ellefsen; Grete Nordrå
- Release date: 10 October 2003
- Running time: 78 minutes
- Country: Norway
- Language: Norwegian
- Box office: $3.3 million

Mother's Elling (Norwegian: Mors Elling) is a 2003 Norwegian comedy film directed by Eva Isaksen. It is a prequel to the 2001 film Elling. According to BoxOfficeMojo, the film made $3,315,075.

== Cast ==
- Per Christian Ellefsen – Elling
- Grete Nordrå – Mor
- Helge Reiss – Bugge-Høvik
- Christin Borge – Mag
- Per Schaanning – Georg
