= North (2009 film) =

- Directed by: Rune Denstad Langlo
- Written by: Erlend Loe
- Produced by: Sigve Endresen; Brede Hovland
- Starring: Anders Baasmo Christiansen
- Cinematography: Philip Øgaard
- Edited by: Zaklina Stojevska
- Release date: February 6, 2009
- Running time: 82 minutes
- Country: Norway
- Language: Norwegian

North is a Norwegian film from 2009 written by Erlend Loe and directed by Rune Denstad Langlo. Anders Baasmo Christiansen plays the main role of "Jomar Henriksen".

== Summary ==
Following a nervous breakdown, ski athlete Jomar has isolated himself in a lonely existence as the guard of a ski park. When he learns that he might be the father of a child way up north, he sets on a strange and poetic journey through Norway on a snowmobile, with 5 liters of alcohol as sole provisions. On this trip through amazing arctic landscapes, Jomar seems to do everything in his power to avoid reaching his destination. He meets other tender and confused souls, who will all contribute to push Jomar further along his reluctant journey towards the brighter side of life.

== Achievements ==
North participated in the Berlin Film Festival where it won the award "Europa Cinemas Label ex aequo". The film shared the award with a French film called Welcome.

The film won the main award "The Transilvania Trophy" in the Transilvanian International Film Festival and shared it with a Romanian film. The film also won the "Best Cinematography Award" (Philip Øgaard).

Under Tribeca Film Festival 2009 the film received the "Best New Narrative Filmmaker" award.

Under Brussels Film Festival 2009 the film received the "Special Mention for Best Scene" award.

Mads Sjøgård Pettersen won the "Amandaprisen 2009" award for best supporting male role (Ulrik) in North. The movie was also one of three films nominated in four other categories: "best Norwegian film", "best script", "best photography" and "best music".

The "Kanonprisen 2010" award was won by: Anders Baasmo Christiansen (for best male actor), Brede Hovland and Sigve Endresen (for best production) and Bent Holm (for best sound design). The winners of this award are determined after a voting which takes place between members in various film associations in Norway.

North was nominated for the 2009 Nordic Council Film Prize.
