= 90 Minutes =

2001 football video game

- European Dreamcast cover art
- Developer(s): Smilebit
- Publisher(s): Sega
- Platform(s): Dreamcast
- Release: EU: October 25, 2001; JP: February 7, 2002
- Genre(s): Sports
- Mode(s): Single-player, multiplayer

90 Minutes: Sega Championship Football is a football video game developed by Smilebit for the Dreamcast. In Japan it was released as J.League Spectacle Soccer (Jリーグ スペクタクルサッカー), tying it in with the Japanese J.League. It features full field action, as well as sim elements such as the ability to make an all-star team.

== Gameplay ==
Players have the freedom to select from over 32 national teams, as well as club teams from major leagues across Europe and around the world. There is a choice of club teams from the English, French, German, Italian and Spanish leagues. Players may challenge for the World Championship (based on the World Cup) or compete for title glory in a Domestic League competition.

The game also features in-game commentary from British television and radio commentator Alan Parry.

== Reception ==
The game received a score of just 30/100 in Dreamcast Magazine, with reviewer Russell Murray writing that "the awful control and lacklustre speed totally ruins the good old game of football and makes it almost as slow and unimaginative as green bowling or tiddlywinks".
