= Nicolai Cleve Broch =

Norwegian actor

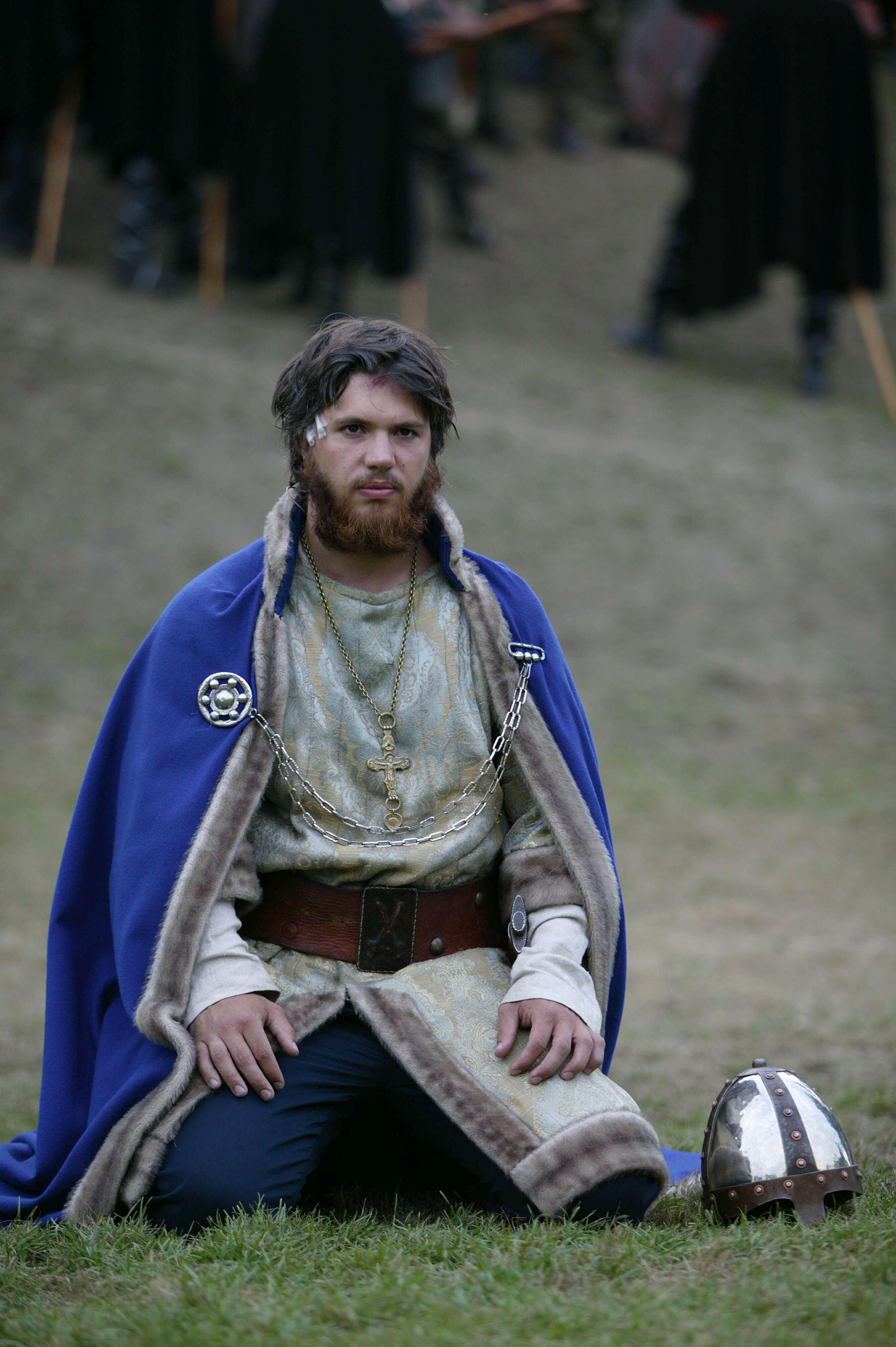
- Broch acting as king Olaf II of Norway in The Saint Olav Drama at Stiklestad 2004
- Born: Nicolai Cleve Broch; 14 November 1975 (age 50); Bærum, Norway
- Education: Liverpool Institute for Performing Arts
- Occupation: Actor
- Years active: 1995–present
- Spouse: Heidi Gjermundsen Broch

Nicolai Cleve Broch (born 14 November 1975) is a Norwegian theatre and film actor. He rose to national fame playing one of the leading roles in the 2002 drama series Lekestue, which aired on NRK in 2002. He is also known for playing the protagonist in Buddy, a romantic comedy from 2003. Other major film credits include Uno, Uro and Den siste revejakta. More recently, Cleve Broch was nominated for an Amanda Award for his portrayal of World War II resistance fighter Gregers Gram in Max Manus. Often appearing alongside Aksel Hennie, the two have been referred to as "Norway's Ben Affleck and Matt Damon".

== Theatre ==
Cleve Broch received his education at the Norwegian National Academy of Theatre from 1996 to 1999. He made his debut in the play Hjalmar og Frode. From 2005, Cleve Broch has been at Nationaltheatret, where he has portrayed Julian the Apostate in Henrik Ibsen's Emperor and Galilean. He has previously been employed at Oslo Nye Teater and Det Norske Teatret, where he has appeared in plays such as The Seagull by Anton Chekhov, and Who's Afraid of Virginia Woolf? by Edward Albee. Cleve Broch was named "Theatre Talent of the Year" in 2002 by Dagbladet.

== Film and television ==
Cleve Broch made his film debut in 1995, in the Swedish-Norwegian coming-of-age film Sebastian. In 2002, Cleve Broch became well known for playing Roger, a kindergarten teacher, on NRK's 2002 drama series Lekestue. Critics praised him for his "dreamlike charisma" and "expressive, awkward, body language", and he was nominated for an award in the category "Best male actor" in Gullruten for his performance. The following year, Cleve Broch got his big break in Buddy, a romantic comedy directed by Morten Tyldum. The film revolves around two friends, played by Cleve Broch and Aksel Hennie, and their ascent from being billboard hangers to getting their own segment in a popular talk show. According to Cleve Broch, "it was a challenge to make all the storylines affect my character and the way he sees things". The film was well received by critics, who highlighted its "perfect cast", and were impressed with what was coined a "new generation of [Norwegian] film actors".

In 2004, Cleve Broch took on another film role alongside Aksel Hennie, this time in Uno (2004), a drama set in a shady gym in Oslo. Cleve Broch plays Morten, the best friend of David (Hennie). The film was a critical success. Verdens Gang and Dagbladet both rated it 5 out of 6, while Birger Vestmo of NRK P3 gave it 6/6. Vestmo praised Cleve Broch for believably portraying the cowardly Morten, while Adresseavisen commended Cleve Broch and Hennie for their "spontaneous interplay". In 2006, Cleve Broch starred opposite Ane Dahl Torp in Uro, a crime film directed by Stefan Faldbakken. His portrayal of the undercover police officer Hans Petter "HP" Hansen was generally well received. Nettavisen's reviewer felt that Cleve Broch carried the film, and praised him for "brilliantly unfolding Hans Petter's troubled mind". Both he and Dahl Torp were nominated for Amanda Awards, for "Best Leading Actor" and Best Leading Actress", respectively.

Cleve Broch once again starred alongside Hennie in Max Manus, a 2008 war film based on real events from the life of resistance fighter Max Manus, played by Hennie. Cleve Broch portrays Gregers Gram, fellow resistance fighter and best friend of Manus. Cleve Broch found it easy to play Hennie's best friend. "Once, many years ago, we were going to play friends, and while preparing for that, we hung out together every day for a whole summer", he recalled. In an interview on TV 2, he expressed pride that he performed all the stunts himself. In preparation for the film, the actors got to fire live ammunition, something "one rarely gets to do" in Norwegian film, according to Cleve Broch. He was once again critically lauded for his on-screen interactions with Hennie, particularly for being able to emphasize the special friendship and humour between Manus and Gram. He received an Amanda Award nomination in the category "Best Actor in a Supporting Role" for his performance.

As an actor, Cleve Broch is noted for radically changing his appearance for his different roles, such a getting physically fit for Uno and Uro, growing a large beard and long hair for Den siste revejakta, and bleaching his hair for his role in Max Manus.

== Personal life ==
Nicolai Cleve Broch is married to his long-time girlfriend Heidi Gjermundsen Broch, who was educated at the Liverpool Institute for Performing Arts and the Norwegian National Academy of Theatre. She got her break playing Eliza Doolittle in Oslo Nye Teater, and has also received attention for her roles in Mamma Mia!, and particularly as Édith Piaf in Piaf. The couple has two sons, Jakob and Jørgen. Jørgen is also an actor, he portrayed Benjamin Elstad in two seasons of Stayer (2024). Cleve Broch is the half-brother of actress Ida Elise Broch.

== Selected filmography ==
Year	Film	Role	Notes
1995	Sebastian	Ulf	
2003	Buddy	Kristoffer Haukeland	
2004	Uno	Morten	
2006	Uro	Hans Petter "HP" Hansen	Nominated - Amanda Award for Best Actor
2007	Lønsj	Marius	
2008	Den siste revejakta	Robert	
2008	Max Manus	Gregers Gram	Nominated - Amanda Award for Best Actor in a Supporting Role
2010	Essential Killing	Helicopter Pilot	
2015	Frikjent	Aksel	
2018	Kielergata	Marius Borge	
2019	Beforeigners	Lars	
2020	Morden i Sandhamn	Alexander	8 episodes
