= Håkon Gundersen =

Norwegian footballer (1907-1986)

Personal information
- Date of birth: 18 September 1907
- Date of death: 26 December 1986 (aged 79)
- Place of death: Sarpsborg, Norway
- Position: Goalkeeper

International career
Years	Team	Apps	(Gls)
1936–1937	Norway	2	(0)

Håkon Gundersen (18 September 1907 – 26 December 1986) was a Norwegian footballer. He played in two matches for the Norway national football team from 1936 to 1937. He was also part of Norway's squad for the football tournament at the 1936 Summer Olympics, but he did not play in any matches.
