= Trond Espen Seim =

Norwegian actor (born 1971)

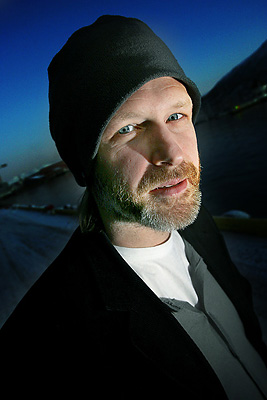
- Trond Espen Seim during the Tromsø International Film Festival (TIFF) in 2008
- Born: 4 October 1971 (age 54); Oslo, Norway
- Years active: 1996–present
- Children: 2

Trond Espen Seim (born 4 October 1971) is a Norwegian actor.

He has played private detective Varg Veum in a series of films based on the eponymous series of novels by Gunnar Staalesen. On 18 March 2010, Seim was cast in the film The Thing, which premiered on 14 October 2011 in the United States and 2 December 2011 in the United Kingdom.

== Selected filmography ==
=== Varg Veum films ===
- Bitre blomster (September 2007)
- Tornerose (January 2008)
- Din til døden (March 2008)
- Falne engler (April 2008)
- Kvinnen i kjøleskapet (September 2008)
- Begravde hunder (October 2008)
- Skriften på veggen (August 2010)
- Svarte får (January 2011)
- Dødens drabanter (2011)
- I mørket er alle ulver grå (2011)
- De døde har det godt (2011)
- Kalde hjerter (2012) (Also director)

=== Television ===
- The Legacy (2014-2017) - Robert Eliassen
- Mammon (2016) – Prime Minister Michael Woll
- Cape Town (2016) – Mat Joubert

=== Other films ===
- I Am Dina (2002) – The First Lieutenant
- Hawaii, Oslo (2004) – Vidar
- Troubled Water (2008) – Jon M
- The Frost (2009) – Alfred
- The Thing (2011) – Edvard Wolner
- Revenge (2015)
- Amundsen (2019) – Fridtjof Nansen
