= I Am Dina =

2002 Scandinavian film

- Norwegian Theatrical poster
- Directed by: Ole Bornedal
- Written by: Herbjørg Wassmo (novel); Ole Bornedal
- Produced by: Paulo Branco
- Starring: Maria Bonnevie; Mads Mikkelsen; Gérard Depardieu; Christopher Eccleston
- Music by: Marco Beltrami
- Distributed by: Columbia TriStar Film Distributors International
- Release date: 8 March 2002 (Norway)
- Running time: 125 minutes
- Language: English
- Budget: NOK 141,000,000
- Box office: $2.4 million (Norway)

I Am Dina is a 2002 Norwegian-Swedish-Danish film directed by Ole Bornedal. It is based on the 1989 book Dinas bok (Dina's Book) by Herbjørg Wassmo. It was one of the most high-profile films in Norwegian movie history.

== Plot ==
In Northern Norway during the 1860s, a little girl named Dina accidentally causes boiling lye to spill over her mother at the laundry, causing her mother's death. Overcome with grief, her father refuses to raise her, leaving her in the care of the household servants. Dina grows up wild and unmanageable, with her only friend being the stable boy, Tomas. She summons her mother's ghost and develops a strange fascination with death as well as a passion for living. Family friend Jacob encourages Dina's father to hire a tutor, Lorch, who introduces her to the cello. When Jacob asks for Dina's hand in marriage, Dina refuses. Her outraged father slaps her, prompting Dina to attack him. Knowing that Lorch and Dina have grown close, her father retaliates by sending Lorch away, devastating Dina. Unable to come to terms with Lorch's departure, Dina nearly kills Lorch in a fit of insanity.

When Dina is old enough, she marries Jacob and moves to Reinsnes, a port he runs with his mother, Karen, and his stepsons Niels and Anders. Niels dislikes Dina's eccentricity, and that she has taken over accounting duties at Reinsnes. When Jacob tries to fix the roof of his mistress' house, he falls and breaks his leg. The injury results in gangrene poisoning. As Jacob's health worsens, Dina takes him on a sled to the top of a cliff and pushes him off to his death, hoping to end his suffering and send him to a better place. Jacob's death reunites her with Tomas and the two have a passionate affair. Several months later, she gives birth to a baby boy that she names Benjamin, presumably her offspring with Tomas. She then learns of Lorch's death when the latter bequeaths her his cello.

Some years later, as a child, Benjamin accidentally sets fire to the barn. Dina falls in love with a courageous, handsome Russian named Zhukovsky, who rushes into the burning barn to save her beloved horses. It turns out Zhukovsky had seen Dina several years ago in Bergen and was smitten by her, and he has come to Reinsnes to court her. However, he leaves suddenly and Dina forces herself on Tomas.

While drunk, Niels rapes and impregnates a servant named Stina. When Dina finds out, she issues an ultimatum to Niels: marry Stina or leave for America. Niels will not countenance marrying a servant, but cannot afford to leave for America, since Dina has confiscated his savings and gave a third of his money to Stina. Zhukovsky returns to Reinsnes to take a prisoner back to Bergen. When a drunken and penniless Niels staggers into the house, Dina announces that he will soon be leaving for America. Niels asks Stina to marry him, but she refuses. Overcome with despair, Niels hangs himself.

Dina's father tells Dina that Zhukovsky is an anarchist involved in a plot against the King, and has been sentenced to hang. A distraught Dina rushes to Bergen and attempts to exonerate Zhukovsky. However, when she visits him in prison and her visiting time is up, Dina attacks the guards. They savagely beat her in retaliation, causing her to lose her baby with Zhukovsky. On the way back to Reinsnes, she is saved by Anders, who stops her bleeding. Despite this violent event, Dina's appeal is successful. Zhukovsky is released and he disappears afterwards. Several weeks later, Dina nearly drowns while teaching Benjamin how to sail. Luckily, she is saved by Zhukovsky who is on a nearby steamer. In her near-death state, she dreams that Zhukovsky announces that he is leaving her again and she kills him. Dina regains consciousness and asks if he is going to leave her. Zhukovsky says he will always be leaving her, though he says he will always be coming back.

== Cast ==
- Maria Bonnevie as Dina
- Gérard Depardieu as Jacob Grønlev
- Christopher Eccleston as Leo Zhukovsky
- Pernilla August as Hjertrud, Dina's mother
- Bjørn Floberg as Edvard, Dina's father
- Amanda Jean Kvakland as Little Dina
- Hans Matheson as Tomas
- Jørgen Langhelle as Anders
- Mads Mikkelsen as Niels
- Søren Sætter-Lassen as Lorch
- Kate Hardie as Stina
- Wenche Foss as Karen
- Bodil Udsen as Oline
- Anette Hoff as Dagny
- Henning Jensen as Gentleman
- Jørgen Reenberg as The Merchant
- Bjørn Sundquist as Prosecutor

== Production ==
=== Casting ===
Though the movie is set in 1860s Norway, all the dialogue is in English, resulting in a variety of accents throughout the movie.

There was some controversy surrounding the casting of the movie, as it was felt by many that Gørild Mauseth was the right choice for the part. In the end the casting of Maria Bonnevie was accepted.

=== Filming ===
The film is shot on location in Kjerringøy, in the present-day municipality of Bodø, in Nordland, Norway, and features spectacular fjord scenery.
