= SF Norge =

Film distribution company

SF Norge AS
- Trade name: SF Studios
- Type: Subsidiary
- Industry: Film distribution
- Founded: 1989
- Headquarters: Norway
- Number of employees: 9 (2026)
- Parent: SF Studios

SF Norge AS is a Norwegian-to-Swedish adult company for film distribution which was established in 1989. The company buys and sells films and distributes them to Norwegian cinemas. On 1 January 2000, SF signed a deal with the American film company 20th Century Fox. SF has also signed distribution deals with other large companies such as New Line Cinema, MGM and Revolution Studios.

In 2004, SF Norge set up its own production company for Norwegian films. They produce local films, and deal with the rights, launch and investment in Norwegian films from external producers.
