= Per Christian Ellefsen =

Norwegian actor (born 1954)

- Born: 1954 (age 70–71)
- Occupation: Actor

Per Christian Ellefsen (born 1954) is a Norwegian actor, mostly known from his roles in Elling and Rare Exports: A Christmas Tale. He studied at the Norwegian National Academy of Theatre from 1974–1977, and began working at the National Theatre in 1997.

== Filmography ==
- 2016 Run for Love
- 2014 1001 Grams
- 2011 Magic Silver II
- 2010 Rare Exports
- 2008 Hotel Cæsar (TV series)
- 2007 Radiopiratene
- 2007 Elias og kongeskipet
- 2006 Babas bilar
- 2006 Dobbel salto (TV movie)
- 2005 Love Me Tomorrow
- 2004 Asfaltevangeliet
- 2004 The Homolulu Show (short)
- 2003 Mors Elling
- 2002 Min søsters børn i sneen
- 2002 I Am Dina
- 2001 Elling
- 2000 Soria Moria (TV series)
- 1999 Olsenbandens siste stikk
- 1999 Absolutt blåmandag
- 1998-1999 Karl & Co (TV series)
- 1998 Red Indian
- 1996 Mot i brøstet (TV series)
- 1993 Fredrikssons fabrikk (TV series)
- 1990 Aksjemordet (TV mini-series)
- 1986: Mama Tumaini
- 1986 Plastposen
