= Morten Tyldum =

Norwegian film director (born 1967)

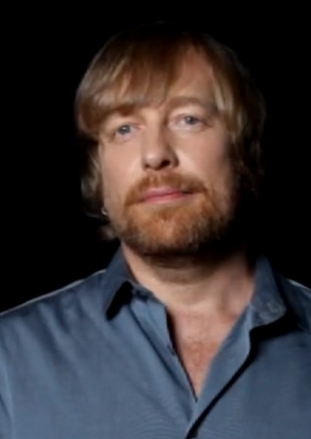
- Tyldum in 2013
- Born: 19 May 1967 (age 59); Bergen, Norway
- Education: School of Visual Arts
- Occupation: Director
- Years active: 1991–present
- Spouse: Janne Tyldum (-2016)
- Children: 1

Morten Tyldum (Norwegian: [ˈmɔ̂ʈːn̩ ˈtʏ̀ldʉm]; born 19 May 1967) is a Norwegian film director. He is best known in his native Norway for directing the thriller film Headhunters (2011), based on the novel by Jo Nesbø, and internationally for directing the historical drama The Imitation Game (2014), for which he was nominated for the Academy Award for Best Director, and the science fiction drama Passengers (2016).

== Early life ==
Tyldum was born in Bergen, Norway. He was educated at the School of Visual Arts in New York. He originally wanted to be a musician, but abandoned the ambition when he entered film school.

== Career ==
He had his feature film debut with Buddy in 2003, a film that won great popular and critical acclaim. Previously he had worked in television, music videos, commercials and short films. He had been named Film Talent of the Year by the newspaper Dagbladet in 1999.

Since Buddy, he has made the movie Fallen Angels in 2008 and Headhunters (Hodejegerne) in 2011. Headhunters is based on the 2008 novel by same name written by Jo Nesbø. It became the highest-grossing Norwegian film that year.

He made his English language debut with the historical drama The Imitation Game, about the life of mathematician Alan Turing, starring Benedict Cumberbatch. The Imitation Game immediately became an international success, and was nominated for eight Oscars at the 87th Academy Awards, including Best Picture and a Best Director nomination for Tyldum himself.

== Personal life ==
Tyldum lived in Beverly Hills with his wife Janne and their child. They also maintained a house in Norway. After he divorced his wife and her death by suicide, he moved back to Oslo, Norway, with his son.

In November 2025 he announced his engagement to The Challenge alumni Big (Tula) T. In 2026, Tyldum and Tula married after being engaged for 4 months.

== Filmography ==
Film

- Buddy (2003)
- Fallen Angels (2008)
- Headhunters (2011)
- The Imitation Game (2014)
- Passengers (2016)
- Ibelin (2027)

Short film

Year	Title	Notes
1996	Lorenzo	
2000	Fort Forever	
2002	H	Segment of Folk flest bor i Kina

Television

Year	Title	Director	Executive Producer	Notes
1991	U - rett og slett	Yes	No	
1992	U - Verden	Yes	No	
1992-1994	U	Yes	No	19 episodes
1993	U - Vår Vår	Yes	No	2 episodes
1994	U - Musikk	Yes	No	Miniseries
1994	U-natt	Yes	No	1 episode
1994	U - Åtte & 1/2	Yes	No	8 episodes
1996	En mann må gjøre det han må	Yes	No	TV movie
2017	Counterpart	Yes	Yes	Episode "The Crossing"
2018	Jack Ryan	Yes	Yes	Episode "Pilot"
2020	Defending Jacob	Yes	Yes	Miniseries
2023	Silo	Yes	Yes	3 episodes
2026	Cape Fear	Yes	Yes	Episode "Fingers & Toes"

== Awards and nominations ==
Year	Award	Title	Result
2002	Mannheim-Heidelberg International Filmfestival - Special Prize	Buddy	Won
2002	Mannheim-Heidelberg International Filmfestival - FIPRESCI Prize	Buddy	Won
2002	Mannheim-Heidelberg International Filmfestival - Award of Independent Cinema Owners	Buddy	Won
2003	Warsaw International Film Festival - Audience Award	Buddy	Won
2003	Norwegian International Film Festival - Audience Award	Buddy	Won
2003	Norwegian International Film Festival - Most Enjoyable Film	Buddy	Won
2003	Molodist International Film Festival - Best Film Award	Buddy	Nominated
2003	Bratislava International Film Festival - Grand Prix	Buddy	Nominated
2003	Amanda Awards, Norway - Best Nordic Newcomer	Buddy	Nominated
2004	Sofia International Film Festival - Grand Prix	Buddy	Won
2004	Amanda Awards, Norway - Best Film	Buddy	Won
2008	Amanda Awards, Norway - Best Director	Fallen Angels	Won
2011	Philadelphia Film Festival - Audience Award	Headhunters	Won
2012	European Film Awards - Audience Award	Headhunters	Nominated
2012	Amanda Awards, Norway - Public Choice Award	Headhunters	Won
2013	BAFTA Film Award - Best Foreign Film	Headhunters	Nominated
2014	Hollywood Film Awards - Best Director	The Imitation Game	Won
2015	AACTA International Awards - Best Direction	The Imitation Game	Nominated
2015	Directors Guild Awards - Outstanding Directorial Achievement in Feature Film	The Imitation Game	Nominated
2015	Academy Award for Best Director	The Imitation Game	Nominated
