= Gunnar Staalesen =

Norwegian writer (born 1947)

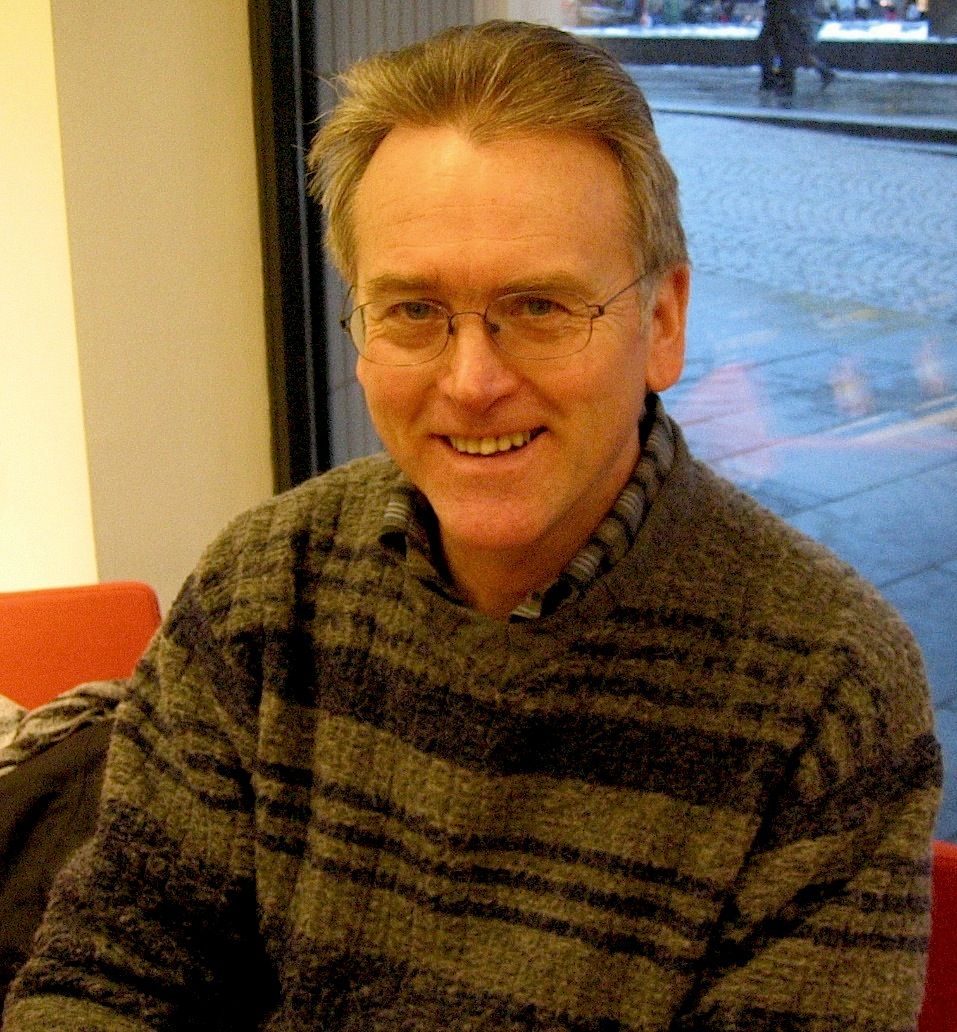
- Born: 19 October 1947 (age 78); Bergen, Hordaland, Norway
- Occupation: Novelist
- Spouse: Ellen-Karin Kristiansen (m. 1969)
- Writing career
- Period: 1969–present
- Genres: Murder mystery Crime fiction Historical novel
- Website: www.vargveum.no

Gunnar Staalesen (born 19 October 1947) is a Norwegian writer. He is a major figure in the Nordic noir crime fiction genre through his 20 novels featuring Varg Veum, a private detective in Bergen on the rainy west coast of Norway. The Varg Veum series has been praised as one of the best in modern crime fiction, and Staalesen has sold more than 4 million books in 24 countries. Staalesen is also a screenwriter and a playwright who has worked extensively with Den Nationale Scene, the largest theatre in Bergen.

== Early life ==
Staalesen was born in Bergen, where he has lived his entire life. His parents were an educator and a nurse, and he grew up mostly in the Nordnes neighbourhood. A bookworm from childhood, he credits his initial interest in crime fiction to reading Sir Arthur Conan Doyle’s Sherlock Holmes books as a teenager. Staalesen earned a degree in language and literary studies from the University of Bergen in 1976, studying French and English while also working as a journalist, a film critic and a press secretary at Den Nationale Scene.

== Career ==
After Staalesen failed to sell a collection of poems and a novel as a teenager, he published his first novel, Times of Innocence, in 1969. He published three additional novels, including the first two books in a series of crime novels starring two Bergen police officers, before he introduced Varg Veum in 1977 in the novel “Bukken til havresekken.”

Staalesen was inspired to create Veum, a social worker turned private detective, as an experiment in placing the classic detective archetype of American literature in modern-day Bergen. Veum was particularly influenced by Raymond Chandler’s Philip Marlowe, Ross Macdonald’s Lew Archer and Dashiell Hammett's Sam Spade. Staalesen was also inspired by the juxtaposition of crime fiction and social realism in the Martin Beck series published from 1965 to 1976 by Swedish writers Maj Sjöwall and Per Wahlöö. Veum’s physical appearance is almost never mentioned in the books, but Staalesen chose the character’s name to emphasize the private eye’s lone wolf status in society. In the Old Norse language, the phrase “Varg Veum” translates literally to “wolf in a sanctuary,” meaning a person that is made an outlaw.

Staalesen’s crime novels frequently examine social injustices illuminated by Veum through his detective work. The series has been praised for its intricate plots, atmospheric evocation of the Norwegian settings and clever interpretations of the classic detective novel form, leading some reviewers to call Staalesen “the godfather of Norwegian noir.”

In 1997, Staalesen stepped away from crime fiction and published three historical novels examining Bergen across the 20th century. Staalesen considers the Bergen Trilogy to be his best work. Varg Veum makes an appearance in the third novel of the trilogy. Staalesen has written a standalone sequel to the Bergen Trilogy, titled "2020 Post Festum," which was published on 15 October 2021.

Staalesen’s novels have been adapted for cinema, television, radio and the stage. Twelve films based on the Veum series were made between 2007 and 2012, all starring Trond Espen Seim.

== Personal life ==
Staalesen married his wife, Ellen-Karin Kristiansen, in 1969, and they are grandparents.

== Bibliography ==
=== Varg Veum works ===
Staalesen has written 20 novels and two short story collections with Veum as the main character. Veum also has appeared in additional short stories, screenplays, graphic novels and radio plays.

- Bukken til havresekken (1977)
- Din til døden (1979) (English: Yours Until Death, 1993)
- Tornerose sov i hundre år (1980)
- Kvinnen i kjøleskapet (1981)
- I mørket er alle ulver grå (1983) (English: At Night All Wolves Are Grey, 1986)
- Hekseringen (short stories, 1985)
- Svarte får (1988) (English: Black Sheep, 1988)
- Falne engler (1989) (English: Fallen Angels, 2020)
- Bitre blomster (1991) (English: Bitter Flowers, 2021)
- Begravde hunder biter ikke (1993)
- Skriften på veggen (1995) (English: The Writing on the Wall, 2004)
- De døde har det godt (short stories, 1996)
- Som i et speil (2002) (English: Mirror Image, 2024)
- Ansikt til ansikt (2004)
- Dødens drabanter (2006) (English: The Consorts of Death, 2009)
- Kalde hjerter (2008) (English: Cold Hearts, 2013)
- Vi skal arve vinden (2010) (English: We Shall Inherit the Wind, 2015)
- Der hvor roser aldri dør (2012) (English: Where Roses Never Die, 2016)
- Ingen er så trygg i fare (2014) (English: Wolves in the Dark, 2017)
- Storesøster (2016) (English: Big Sister, 2018)
- Utenfor er hundene (2018) (English: Wolves at the Door, 2019)
- Forfulgt av død (2023) (English: Pursued by Death, 2024)

=== Selected additional novels ===
- Uskyldstider (first novel, 1969)
- Rygg i rand, to i spann (first crime novel, winner of the Riverton Prize, 1975)
- 1900. Morgenrød (The Bergen Trilogy, 1997)
- 1950. High Noon (The Bergen Trilogy, 1998)
- 1999. Aftensang (The Bergen Trilogy, 2000)
- 2020. Post Festum (2021)
- 1899. Preludium (2025)
