= Stefan Faldbakken =

Norwegian film director

- Born: 13 January 1972 (age 54); England
- Occupations: Film director Screenwriter
- Years active: 2001-present

Stefan Faldbakken (born 13 January 1972) is a Norwegian film director and screenwriter. His film Uro was screened in the Un Certain Regard section at the 2006 Cannes Film Festival.

== Filmography ==
- Kosmonaut (2001)
- Anolit (2002)
- Uro (2006)
- Varg Veum – Skriften på veggen (2010)
