= Tolle =

Tolle may refer to:

== People ==
- Charles Tolle, French paralympic athlete
- Eckhart Tolle (born 1948), German-born spiritual teacher and self-help author
- Helga Charlotte Tolle (fl. 1951–2010), German actress, singer and dancer
- Jeff Tolle, American pastor
- Jim Tolle, American pastor, small college president, and radio host
- Neva Tölle (born 1956), Croatian feminist activist
- Payton Tolle (born 2002), American baseball player

== Places ==
- Porto Tolle, a town in the province of Rovigo, Veneto, Italy

== See also ==
- Tol (disambiguation)
- Toll (disambiguation)
