= Troll (disambiguation) =

A troll is a mythological creature.

Troll may also refer to:

== Places ==
- Troll (research station), a Norwegian Antarctic research station on Queen Maud Land
  - Troll Airfield, an airfield nearby
- Troll gas field, a large reservoir of gas in the northern North Sea
  - Troll A platform, a Norwegian production platform for this gas field
- Troll Ski Resort, a ski area in the Cariboo region of British Columbia

== People ==
=== Surname ===
- Carl Troll (1899–1975), German geographer
- Karl Troll (1865–1954), Austrian architect
- Max Troll (1902–1972), German communist and police informer
- Wilhelm Troll (1897–1978), German botanist

=== Nickname ===
- Francisco Álvarez (baseball) (born 2001), Venezuelan professional baseball player

=== Types of people ===
- Troll (gay slang), a gay man who wanders about looking for sexual partners
- Troll, a nickname for a resident of the Lower Peninsula of Michigan
- Trolling, an act in which a person attempts to disrupt a community or garner attention and controversy through provocative messages

== Arts, entertainment, and media ==
=== Fictional entities ===
- Troll (Dungeons & Dragons), a monster in the Dungeons & Dragons setting
- Troll (Harry Potter), a creature in J. K. Rowling's Harry Potter universe
- Troll, a species of humanoid aliens from the webcomic Homestuck
- Troll (Marvel Comics), a character appearing in Marvel Comics
- Troll (Middle-earth), a creature in J. R. R. Tolkien's Middle-earth universe
- Troll (Youngblood), an Image comics character
- Troll, a playable race in World of Warcraft
- Troll, one of the pair of fictional demons Hag and Troll appearing in Marvel Comics

=== Films ===
- Troll (1986 film), a fantasy film
  - Troll 2, an unrelated sequel to the above film produced under the title Goblins
  - Troll 3 (disambiguation), two different possible sequels, again unrelated to the previous two films
- Troll (2022 film), a Norwegian monster film
  - Troll 2 (2025 film), the second instalment in the Norwegian monster film series
- Trolls (film), a 2016 animated family film produced by DreamWorks

=== Literature ===
- The Troll (2009), a children's story by Julia Donaldson and David Roberts
- "Troll Bridge" (1991), a Discworld short story by Terry Pratchett

=== Music ===
- Troll (Norwegian band), a black metal band formed in 1992
- Troll (Swedish band), a 1985–1992 pop band
- The Trolls, a 2001–2004 American rock band fronted by Iggy Pop
- Troll, an album by Lumsk, 2005
- Troll (EP), by James Ferraro, 2017
- "Trollz" (song), by 6ix9ine and Nicki Minaj, 2020
- "Troll", a song by Bruno Sutter from Bruno Sutter, 2015
- "Troll", a song by IU from Lilac, 2021

=== Public art ===
- Bay Bridge Troll, a piece of art in the Oakland-San Francisco Bay Bridge, US
- Fremont Troll, a piece of public art in Seattle, Washington, US

=== Television ===
- Trollz (TV series), a 2005 animated show by DIC Entertainment based on the Troll doll
- Trolls: The Beat Goes On!, a 2018–2019 animated Netflix series based on the 2016 film
- Trolls: TrollsTopia, a 2020–2022 animated Hulu series, also based on the 2016 film
- "Trolls", a Lilyhammer episode
- "The Troll", a Wander Over Yonder episode

=== Other uses in arts, entertainment, and media ===
- Troll doll, a doll created by Thomas Dam in the 1960s
- Trolls (video game) (1992), a PC game by Capstone Software

== Law ==
- Copyright troll, in intellectual property rights
- Patent troll, in intellectual property rights
- Trademark troll, in intellectual property rights

== Other uses ==
- Troll (automobile), a Norwegian car manufacturer
- Trolling (fishing), the practice of fishing by drawing a baited line or lure behind a boat
- HNoMS Troll, several ships of the Royal Norwegian Navy
- IWL TR 150 Troll 1, an East German 1960s motor scooter by Industriewerke Ludwigsfelde

== See also ==
- Toll (disambiguation)
- Trawling, a method of fishing that involves pulling a fishing net
- Trollbloods, a faction in the Hordes game setting
- Trollhunter, a 2010 Norwegian fantasy horror film made in the form of a mockumentary
- Trolltooth (disambiguation)
- Trollface, an art piece frequently associated with internet trolling
