= Scott Bauer =

American pastor

- Born: Scott George Bauer; January 11, 1954; Chicago, Illinois, U.S.
- Died: October 24, 2003 (aged 49); Los Angeles, California, U.S.
- Occupations: Pastor, Speaker
- Spouse: Rebecca Hayford Bauer

Scott George Bauer (January 11, 1954 – October 24, 2003) was the senior pastor of The Church on the Way from late 1999 until his sudden death in 2003. He also served as the Chairman of the Board of Trustees of the King's College and Seminary and as the supervisor the Los Angeles North Valley District of Foursquare Churches. On weekdays, he was known for his messages that aired on the KTLW radio program titled Life on the Way. Before his death, Scott Bauer had finished writing his first book, The New Church On The Way. He helped in the founding the now defunct Los Angeles Community Builders Inc. which battled against neighborhood deterioration and juvenile delinquency. He is credited with assisting in the founding of the Israel-Christian Nexus with his "encouragement" and "guidance". Among Southern California clergy, he was known for bringing Jewish and Christian leaders together.

== Biography ==
Bauer was born in Chicago in 1954 to Bill and Dolores Bauer. Scott Bauer was an associate pastor of the Church On The Way from 1982 to the time when he was named by his father-in-law, church founder, Jack Hayford, as his successor in 1999, upon Hayford's retirement. Under his senior pastoral leadership, Jim Tolle was named as the pastor of La Iglesia En El Camino, the Spanish expression of the church and a theater complex was purchased in Santa Clarita, California, which was renovated into a church, The Church On The Way-Santa Clarita, now pastored by Doug Andersen and Jack Hayford's daughter Christa.

== Education ==
Scott Bauer obtained his bachelor's degree from UCLA, his master's from Fuller Theological Seminary and a doctorate in ministry from Oral Roberts University.

== Family ==
Bauer married Rebecca Hayford, a daughter of Church On The Way founder Jack Hayford. Together they had three children (Brian, Kyle, and Lindsey). Bauer's widow, Rebecca Hayford Bauer is a Gold Medallion author who has authored books such as The Spirit Filled Family, Seasons of Praise: A 52 Week worship Celebration for the Entire Family, and Just 25 Days 'Til Christmas. Rebecca Hayford Bauer was married to Scott Bauer for 27 years at the time of his sudden death. Their son Brian is lead pastor at Grace Church in San Marcos California, their second son Kyle was a missionary in Mexico and now pastor for the Spanish speaking congregation at the Church on the Way in Santa Clarita, and their daughter Lindsey is a church planter in Sacramento. In 2008, Rebecca resigned her staff position at The Church on the Way to pursue teaching, writing and other more lucrative endeavors. Currently she administers the "Van Nuys Campus" of The Kings University.

== Death ==
At the conclusion of a "Church Alive!" prayer meeting and worship service on the evening of Wednesday, October 22, 2003, Scott Bauer had a cerebral hemorrhage, causing him to lapse into a coma. He died two days later, on October 24, 2003, in the Northridge Hospital Medical Center, aged 49.

On October 29, 2003, a funeral service was conducted at the Church On the Way with over 6,000 people in attendance. Rabbi Steven Jacobs, personal friend of Scott Bauer, from Kol Tikvah Congregation in Woodland Hills was among the mourners, and spoke on behalf of the Jewish community. Bauer is interred in the Forest Lawn Memorial Park (Glendale) near the Foursquare denomination founder Aimee Semple McPherson and his mother-in-law Anna Hayford.

== See also ==
- International Church of the Foursquare Gospel
- Jack Hayford
- Jim Tolle
- Cleansing Stream Ministry
