= Mads Sjøgård Pettersen =

Norwegian actor (born 1984)

- Born: 21 January 1984 (age 41); Norway
- Other names: Mads Pettersen; Mads Sjøgård
- Occupation: Actor

Mads Sjøgård Pettersen (born 21 January 1984) is a Norwegian actor known for his role of Fredrik Kayser on mini-series The Heavy Water War and for his portrayal of Håvard Bakkeli on the series Nobel.

== Career ==
In 2009 he portrayed Thomas in the film North (in Norwegian: Nord). In 2012 he was part of the cast of the mini-series Erobreren where he portrayed young Axel. In 2015 he played the role of Fredrik Kayser, a resistance member, in The Heavy Water War (in Norwegian: "Kampen om tungtvannet"). In 2016 he portrayed Håvard Bakkeli in Nobel. In 2017 he portrayed Per in the film Askeladden - I Dovregubbens Hall.

== Filmography ==
=== TV series ===
Year	Title	Role	Notes
2019-2020	Home for Christmas	Stein	8 episodes
2019-2020	Occupied	Petter Bjørnstad	5 episodes
2018-2024	Lykkeland	Martin Lekanger	24 episodes
2016	Nobel	Håvard Bakkeli	8 episodes
2015	Kampen om tungtvannet	Fredrik Kayser	6 episodes – mini-series
2013	Hjem	BP	5 episodes
2011, 2013	Dag	To Tom Fire	4 episodes
2012	Erobreren	Axel	3 episodes – mini-series
2012	Lilyhammer	Sverre Falck	Episode "Pack Your Lederhosen"

=== Film ===
Year	Title	Role	Notes
2025	Troll 2	Major Kristoffer Holm	
2023	Christmas As Usual	Jørgen Bruun	
2022	Troll	Captain Kristoffer Holm	
2019	Amundsen	Helmer Hanssen	
2017	The 12th Man	Marius Gronnvoll	
2017	Askeladden - I Dovregubbens Hall	Per	Alongside Allan Hyde, Thorbjørn Harr and Synnøve Macody Lund
2016	Cave	Adrian	Alongside Heidi Toini, Benjamin Helstad and Ingar Helge Gimle
2015	Eddie the Eagle	Erik Moberg	
2015	Villmark Asylum	Even	
2013	Victoria	Ditlef	Alongside Iben Akerlie, Jakob Oftebro, Bill Skarsgård, Fridtjov Såheim and Torstein Bjørklund
2009	Nord	Thomas	Alongside Anders Baasmo Christiansen, Kyrre Hellum, Marte Aunemo and Astrid Solhaug
2008	Fritt vilt II	Johan	Alongside Ingrid Bolsø Berdal, Marthe Snorresdotter Rovik, Fridtjov Såheim, Rolf Kristian Larsen and Robert Follin

=== Theater ===
Year	Play	Rol	Director	Theater	Notes
–	På Bunnen	Vaska Pepel	Osk. Korsunovas	Nationaltheatret	–
–	En Himmel Full Av Stjerner	Tor Arne	I. Tindberg	Oslo Nye Centralteatret	–
–	Intemperance	Kyrre	Gemma Bodinetz	Everyman Theatre	–

== Awards ==
Year	Category	Award	Film	Result
2009	Best Supporting Actor	Amanda Award	Nord	Won
