= Jeff Tolle =

- Born: Jeffrey Jay Tolle
- Occupation: Pastor
- Spouse: Evelyn Tolle

Jeffrey Jay Tolle is an American pastor. He serves as senior pastor of Vida Church, a church in the City of Los Angeles located in the community of North Hills. He is also the former pastor of CityLife Church (Ciudad de Vida) as well as a former youth pastor at La Iglesia En El Camino, which belongs to the International Church of the Foursquare Gospel (as is his wife, Evelyn Tolle). He is also the founder of Eleva. a Christian youth conference.

== Biography ==
Tolle attended Los Angeles Baptist High School, where he served as the school’s ASB spiritual life chairman his senior year. After graduating in 1997, Tolle continued his education, receiving a bachelor's degree in music education from California State University, Northridge in 2001, where he was also a swimmer. He earned his master's degree in intercultural studies at Biola University. He was ordained as a minister in the Foursquare denomination in 2008. Married to Evelyn in 2002, together they have four children.

== See also ==
- Jim Tolle
- Jack Hayford
