= KTLW =

- Lancaster, California; United States
- Broadcast area: Lancaster-Palmdale, California
- Frequency: 88.9 MHz
- Branding: "Air1"

Programming
- Format: Christian worship music

Ownership
- Owner: Educational Media Foundation

Technical information
- Licensing authority: FCC
- Facility ID: 37813
- Class: A
- ERP: 5,800 watts
- HAAT: 83 meters
- Translators: 95.3 K237CG (Inyokern; 91.1 K216EM Arcadia; 91.1 K216FM Valley Village; 101.5 K268CO (Lake Los Angeles)

Links
- Public license information: Public file; LMS
- Webcast: Listen Live
- Website: air1.com

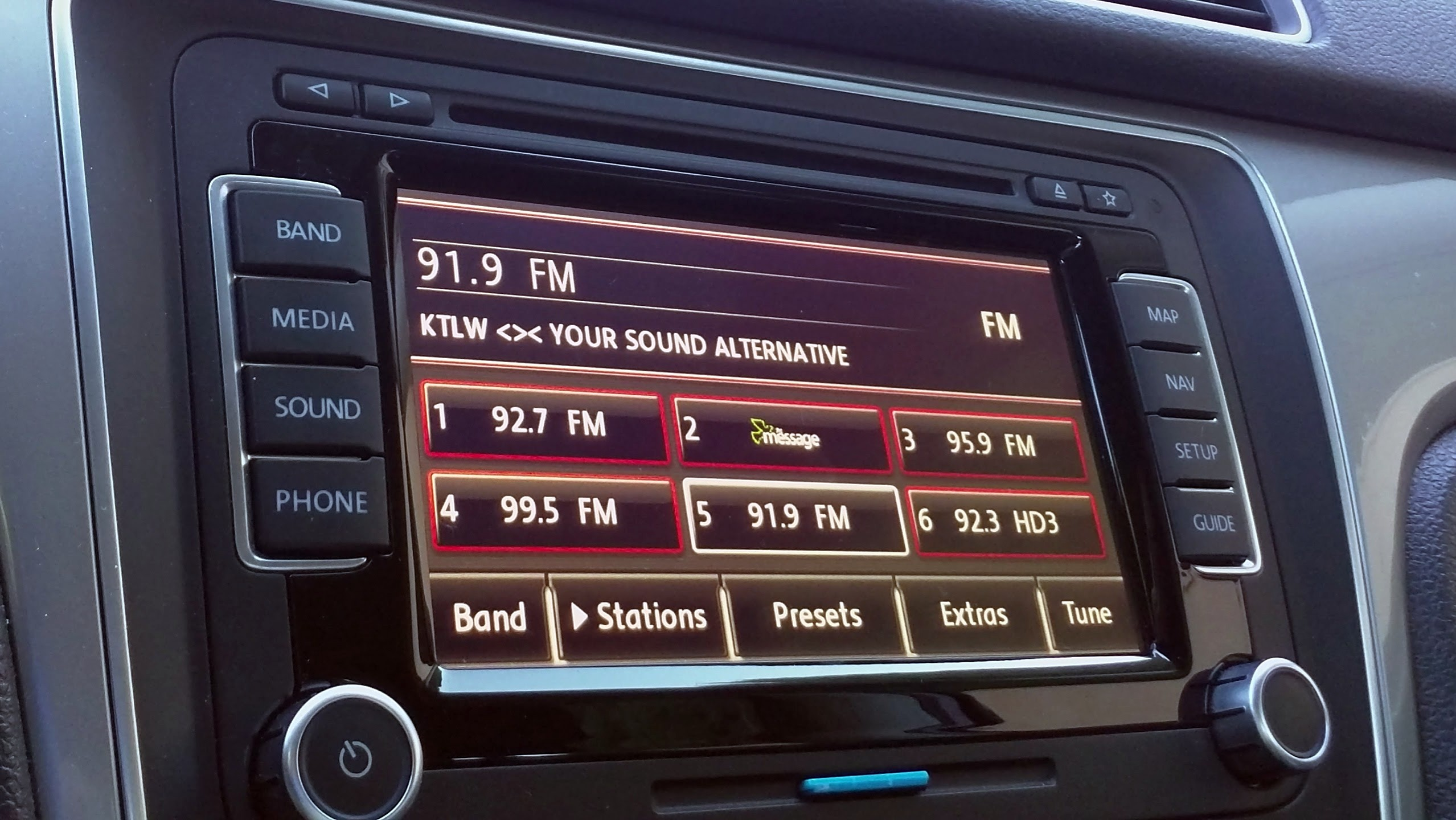
Worship on the Way RDS Data just before signing off in 2015.

KTLW (88.9 FM, "Air1") is an affiliate of the Educational Media Foundation's nationally syndicated Air1 Christian worship music radio network serving parts of the greater Los Angeles area. The station's primary signal broadcasts to the Antelope Valley with station facilities based in Lancaster, California. The station also is heard on several translator signals.

== History ==
=== Worship on the Way Radio ===
On July 3, 1997, The Church on the Way in Van Nuys began transmissions on KTLW under Life on the Way Communications and carried the "Worship on the Way" radio network. Initially, it aired programming from speakers like Jack Hayford, John MacArthur, and Billy Graham, as well as praise and worship music. In June 2015, the station announced its sale to EMF and three translator stations. On July 3, 2015, after an hour of station personnel interviews, favorite song picks, and memories, KTLW played "Majesty", a song written by Jack Hayford and signed off.

=== Air1 Radio ===
Moments after "Worship on the Way" ceased operations, Air1 programming under EMF began. Only parent station KTLW 88.9 in Lancaster and translators 88.9 K205EP in Santa Clarita, 91.9 K220FR in Simi Valley and 91.9 K220HC in Studio City were purchased by EMF. Air1 was chosen over K-Love programming in Los Angeles because, at that time, Univision's Spanish language station in the Los Angeles area, under the name "K-LOVE" on 107.5 FM would have caused a branding conflict. However that was resolved in 2017 when 100.3 FM, then KSWD, was divested to EMF in Los Angeles and struck a deal to air K-Love programming becoming the largest coverage area Christian music station in the Los Angeles metro. The sale of KTLW was consummated on August 31, 2015, at a purchase price of $1.075 million.

The first song to be played as the nationally syndicated feed of Air 1 came on the air on 91.9 FM was the last half of Plumb's "Don't Deserve You". On January 1, 2019, the station, along with the rest of the national network, flipped from Christian Rock to a Christian worship music format playing music by artists such as Elevation Worship, Hillsong Worship, and Vertical Worship as well as several solo artists such as Lincoln Brewster and Kutless.

== Translators ==
Because the station is licensed to Lancaster and their transmitter is located further north in Rosamond, KTLW's signal is unable to cover the entire market, especially with the San Gabriel Mountains hindering its signal southward. Thus, KTLW is relayed by an additional four translators to widen its broadcast area and an HD Radio subchannel of iHeartMedia's KRRL (92.3) itself translating KTLW as the main signal source.

Call sign	Frequency	City of license	FID	FCC info
K237CG	95.3 FM	Inyokern, CA	28567	LMS
K216EM	91.1 FM	Arcadia, CA	88940	LMS
K216FM	91.1 FM	Valley Village, CA	92354	LMS
K268CO	101.5 FM	Lake Los Angeles, CA	148497	LMS
