= Troll bait =

Troll bait may refer to:

- The bait used in trolling, a fishing method where baited fishing lines are drawn through water
- A flame bait, a provocative or offensive message meant to provoke an argument or an angry response

== See also ==
- Troll (disambiguation)
