= David Rudolph =

David Rudolph may refer to:

- David D. Rudolph (born 1949), American politician from Maryland
- David J. Rudolph (born 1967), American scholar
