= Trollz =

Trollz may refer to:

- "Trollz" (song), a 2020 song by 6ix9ine and Nicki Minaj
- Trollz (TV series), an animated show based on the Troll doll

== See also ==
- Troll (disambiguation)
