= Toll Gate =

Toll Gate or Tollgate may refer to:

- Toll gate, a barrier across a toll road or toll bridge that is lifted when the toll is paid

== Entertainment ==
- "Tollgate" (Hale single)
- The Toll-Gate, a 1954 novel by Georgette Heyer
- The Toll Gate, a 1920 American silent Western film

== Places ==
- Tollgate, Ontario, Canada
- Toll Gate, Alabama, U.S.
- Tollgate, Oregon, U.S.
- Toll Gate, West Virginia, U.S.

== See also ==
- Toll Gate Heights, Indiana
- Toll (disambiguation)
- The Toll (disambiguation)
- Toll house (disambiguation)
