= Toll =

Toll may refer to:

== Transportation ==
- Toll (fee), charged for the use of a road or waterway
  - Toll road, a type of road which for which payment is required for passage
  - Road pricing, the modern practice of charging for road use
  - Road toll (historic), the historic practice of charging for road use
  - Shadow toll, payments made by government to the private sector operator of a road based on the number of vehicles using the road
- Road toll (Australia and New Zealand), term for road death toll, i.e., the number of deaths caused annually by road accidents

== Brands and enterprises ==
- Toll Brothers, Horsham Township, Pennsylvania based construction company founded by brothers Robert I. Toll and Bruce E. Toll
- Toll Collect, a transportation support company in Germany
- Toll Group, an Australian transportation company
  - Toll Domestic Forwarding, an Australian freight forwarder
  - Toll Ipec, Australian transportation company
  - Toll Resources & Government Logistics

== Science ==
- Toll (gene), encode members of the Toll-like receptor class of proteins
- Toll-like receptor, a class of proteins that play a key role in the innate immune system

== Technology ==
- Toll (telecommunications), refers to connection charges, for instance note Trunk vs. Toll charging and toll-free telephone numbers
- Toll switching trunk, in telephone communications systems

== Other uses ==
- Toll, Queensland, a locality in the Charters Towers Region, Australia
- Funeral toll, the slow, solemn ringing of church bells at funerals
- Mount Toll, a mountain in Colorado
- Toll Mountain, a mountain in Texas
- Toll (name), a list of people with the name
- Toll, the ringing of a bell
- Tolling (law), a doctrine which allows for the pausing or delaying of the running of the period of time set forth by a statute of limitations

== See also ==
- For Whom the Bell Tolls (disambiguation)
- Tol (disambiguation)
- Tola (disambiguation)
- The Toll (disambiguation)
- Toll Gate (disambiguation)
- Toll house (disambiguation)
- Tolle (disambiguation)
- Troll (disambiguation)
