= The Ash Lad: In the Hall of the Mountain King =

2017 Norwegian fantasy adventure film

- Norwegian theatrical release poster
- Directed by: Mikkel Brænne Sandemose
- Written by: Aleksander Kirkwood Brown, Espen Enger
- Starring: Vebjørn Enger
- Cinematography: John Christian Rosenlund
- Edited by: Vidar Flataukan
- Music by: Ginge Anvik
- Distributed by: Norsk Filmdistribusjon
- Release date: 29 September 2017
- Running time: 104 minutes
- Countries: Norway; Czech Republic; Ireland
- Language: Norwegian
- Box office: $4.23 million

The Ash Lad: In the Hall of the Mountain King (Norwegian: Askeladden - I Dovregubbens Hall) is a 2017 fantasy adventure film directed by Mikkel Brænne Sandemose and starring Vebjørn Enger. It was released on 29 September 2017. It was co-produced by Czech Republic's Sirene Film and Irish Subotica Entertainment.

== Plot ==
Princess Kristin turns 18 and is obliged to be married. According to the legend, the wedding must happen at once, otherwise a gruesome troll will take her away to the mountain. Prince Fredrik arrives to wed Kristin, but she refuses him and runs away. The king promises his daughter's hand and half the kingdom to whoever can save her. Three poor farm boys, Per, Pål, and Espen, head out to find her and slay the Mountain King, in order to claim the reward and save their farm from ruin.

The film is based on the eighteenth-century Norwegian fairy tales of Askeladden.

== Sequel ==
The plot is continued in Ash Lad 2: In Search of the Golden Castle (also directed by Mikkel Brænne Sandemose in 2019), in which Espen Askeladd (Vebjørn Enger) and Princess Kristin (Eili Harboe) star. Per and Pål are imprisoned in a dungeon and sentenced to death, falsely accused of poisoning the King and Queen, by Svein, who aspires to the throne. Espen and Kristin set out to find the water of life (and thus save her parents), in the mythical palace of Soria Moria, under an enchanted Norwegian lake. On the road they encounter robbers and fortune hunters, including a Danish warrioress Ohlmann, who has a sense of humour, but who is also chasing the same prize. Clues lead them to the lake, guarded by monsters. They succeed in their quest, barely avoiding the execution of their friends and the enthronement of the evil Svein. A third film is planned.

== Cast ==
- Vebjørn Enger as Espen Askeladd
- Eili Harboe as Princess Kristin
- Allan Hyde as Prince Frederick
- Mads Sjøgård Pettersen as Per
- Elias Holmen Sørensen as Pål
- Gisken Armand as Stubbekjerringa
- Gard B. Eidsvold as King Erik
- Synnøve Macody Lund as Queen Viktoria
- Thorbjørn Harr as Askeladden's father
- Ida Ursin-Holm as Hulder
- Rune Hagerup as Cato The Messenger
- Arthur Berning as Gunnar
- Nasrin Khusrawi as Waitress
- Antonio de la Cruz as Vesle-Jan

== Release ==
The film was the second-highest-grossing film in Norway in 2017, earning $4.23 million.

== Critical reception ==
The CGI features of the film were criticized for being "more or less" by Morten Ståle Nilsen of Verdens Gang.
