= Ine Marie Wilmann =

Norwegian actress (born 1985)

- Born: 18 February 1985 (age 41)
- Education: Oslo National Academy of the Arts
- Occupation: Actress
- Awards: Amanda Award (2015, 2023); Gullruten (2016)

Ine Marie Wilmann (born 18 February 1985) is a Norwegian stage, film and television actress. Her awards include Amanda in 2015 and 2023, and Gullruten in 2016.

== Biography ==
Wilmann hails from Rykkinn in Bærum. She graduated from the Oslo National Academy of the Arts in 2011. She has had assignments for various theatres, including for Teatret Vårt, Riksteatret, Trøndelag Teater, Den Nationale Scene, and Oslo Nye Teater.

Her television roles include the series Størst av alt (2007), the crime series Det tredje øyet (2014–2016), which earned her the Gullruten award in 2016, and Zombie-Lars (2017–2018).

She played the character "Charlotte" in Anne Sewitsky’s film Homesick, for which she received the Amanda Award for best actress in 2015. She played Sonja Henie in Sewitsky's biopic Sonja from 2018. In 2023 Wilmann received another Amanda Award, for best actress in a supporting role, for the film War Sailor.

Wilmann starred in the 2022 film, Troll (2022 film), directed by Roar Uthaug. She reprises her role as Nora Tidemann in the sequel film, Troll 2 (2025 film), which was released on Netflix on December 1, 2025.
