= ZERO VFX =

- Type: Private
- Industry: Visual effects and advertising
- Founded: 2010
- Founders: Brian Drewes, Sean Devereaux, Marc Sadeghi
- Headquarters: Boston, Massachusetts
- Website: ZERO VFX

ZERO VFX is a visual effects and creative studio with offices in Boston, Massachusetts and Montreal, Quebec. Co-founded by Brian Drewes, Sean Devereaux and Marc Sadeghi in 2010, the company works on feature film and commercial projects.

== History ==
ZERO VFX was founded in 2010 by Brian Drewes, Sean Devereaux and Marc Sadeghi.

ZERO VFX developed Zync in 2011, a cloud based rendering tool for VFX and was sold to Google for an undisclosed sum in August 2014.

With headquarters in Boston, the company opened a second office in Venice Beach, California in November 2015 but went remote for California crew during the COVID-19 pandemic.

ZERO VFX joined forces with Mavericks VFX under the Dream Machine umbrella in 2023 and expanded its presence to Montreal, Quebec in February 2024.

== Sale of Zync ==
ZERO VFX was the original developer of Zync, a cloud based rendering tool geared towards the visual effects industry with support for The Foundry's NUKE, Autodesk Maya, Solid Angle's Arnold and Chaos Group's V-Ray. Zync was sold to Google for an undisclosed sum in August 2014.

== Previous film projects ==
- Creed 2
- Tomb Raider
- Fences
- Patriots Day
- Ghostbusters
- The Magnificent Seven
- Hardcore Henry
- Ridiculous 6
- Zookeeper
- Project X
- Sex Tape
- American Hustle
- Black Mass
- Fury
- Southpaw
- The Equalizer
- The Way, Way Back
- The Interview

== Previous advertising projects ==
- Walmart
- Ocean Spray
- Toyota
- SolarCity
- Snapchat
- Bose Corporation
- Under Armour
- Vaseline
- Jack Daniel's
- New Balance
- Ocean State Job Lot
- US Cellular
- Samsonite
- Humane Society
- Subway
- Friendly's
- 1800 Tequila
- Dunkin' Donuts
