= The Toll =

The Toll may refer to:

- The Toll (band), a rock band from Columbus, Ohio
- The Toll (2020 film), a Canadian film
- The Toll (2021 film), a Welsh film
- "The Toll" (Justified), an episode of the television series Justified
- "The Toll" (Ozark), an episode of the television series Ozark
- The Toll (novel), a 2019 novel by Neal Shusterman

== See also ==
- Toll (disambiguation)
- The Toll Gate (disambiguation)
