= Creed II =

2018 film by Steven Caple Jr.

- Theatrical release poster
- Directed by: Steven Caple Jr.
- Screenplay by: Juel Taylor; Sylvester Stallone
- Story by: Sascha Penn; Cheo Hodari Coker
- Based on: Characters by Sylvester Stallone
- Produced by: Irwin Winkler; Charles Winkler; William Chartoff; David Winkler; Kevin King-Templeton; Sylvester Stallone
- Starring: Michael B. Jordan; Sylvester Stallone; Tessa Thompson; Wood Harris; Florian Munteanu; Phylicia Rashad; Dolph Lundgren
- Cinematography: Kramer Morgenthau
- Edited by: Dana E. Glauberman; Saira Haider; Paul Harb
- Music by: Ludwig Göransson
- Production companies: Metro-Goldwyn-Mayer; Warner Bros. Pictures; Chartoff Productions; Winkler Films
- Distributed by: Metro-Goldwyn-Mayer (United States); Warner Bros. Pictures (International)
- Release dates: November 14, 2018 (Premiere); November 21, 2018 (United States)
- Running time: 130 minutes
- Country: United States
- Language: English
- Budget: $50 million
- Box office: $214.2 million

Creed II is a 2018 American sports drama film directed by Steven Caple Jr. from a screenplay by Juel Taylor and Sylvester Stallone. It is the sequel to Creed (2015), a follow-up to Rocky IV (1985), and the eighth installment in the Rocky franchise. It stars Michael B. Jordan, Stallone, Tessa Thompson, Wood Harris, Florian Munteanu, Phylicia Rashad, and Dolph Lundgren. In the film, under the continued tutelage of Rocky Balboa (Stallone), Adonis Creed (Jordan) faces off against Viktor Drago (Munteanu), the son of Ivan Drago (Lundgren), who became responsible for the death of Adonis' father Apollo Creed thirty-three years earlier.

A Creed sequel was confirmed in January 2016, but was delayed because Creed director Ryan Coogler and Jordan faced scheduling conflicts due to their involvement in Black Panther (2018). Coogler was originally replaced by Stallone, who completed the screenplay by July 2017, but he was replaced by Caple that December, with Coogler instead serving as an executive producer. The rest of the cast, including the returns of Thompson, Rashad, and Lundgren, was confirmed by March 2018. Principal photography lasted from March to June, primarily on location in Philadelphia.

Creed II premiered on November 14, 2018, at the Lincoln Center in New York City and was released in the United States by Metro-Goldwyn-Mayer on November 21. The film received generally positive reviews from critics, who praised the performances (particularly those of Stallone, Jordan, and Lundgren), character development, and Caple's direction, while noting its predictability. It was also a commercial success, grossing $214.2 million worldwide. The film marked Stallone's final appearance in the series as Rocky Balboa, as the former confirmed in Instagram that he set the latter into retirement. It was also his only film in the series in which he served as a co-writer with other people, after serving as sole writer to the original six films, and the last Rocky film he wrote overall.

The sequel, Creed III, directed by Jordan in his directorial debut, was released March 3, 2023.

== Plot ==
Three years after his loss to "Pretty" Ricky Conlan, (Note: As depicted in Creed (2015)) Adonis "Donnie" Creed, alongside his trainer Rocky Balboa, who has beaten his cancer, has won six straight bouts, culminating in a victory over Danny "Stuntman" Wheeler to win the WBC World Heavyweight Championship, and reclaimed his 1967 Ford Mustang which he had lost to Wheeler in a bet. Now a worldwide star, Adonis proposes marriage to his girlfriend, Bianca Taylor, who accepts. Bianca suggests starting a new life together in Los Angeles, but Adonis is reluctant to leave Philadelphia and Rocky.

In Ukraine, Ivan Drago, the former Soviet boxer who killed Adonis' late father Apollo during a bout in 1985, has been broke and destitute since losing to Rocky that year, (Note: As depicted in Rocky IV (1985)) and seeks to regain glory. Assisted by promoter Buddy Marcelle, Ivan pits his son, Viktor, against Adonis. When Rocky, out of fear for Adonis possibly suffering the same fate as Apollo, refuses to support Adonis' acceptance of Viktor's challenge, Adonis leaves for Los Angeles.

Adonis and Bianca settle in a luxurious apartment in Los Angeles close to Adonis' adoptive mother and Apollo's widow, Mary Anne. As they adjust to their new life and prepare for the upcoming match, Bianca learns that she is pregnant. Adonis recruits Tony "Little Duke" Evers, son of his father's trainer and later Rocky's trainer Tony "Duke" Evers, to start training him. However, Adonis becomes overwhelmed by his life's recent changes, rushes into the match in Barclays Center unprepared, and is badly injured by Viktor. Viktor, however, is disqualified for hitting Adonis while he is down, allowing Adonis to retain the World Heavyweight Championship. Nevertheless, Viktor becomes extremely popular in Russia and wins a series of fights with top billing.

With his body and ego shattered, Adonis becomes increasingly disconnected from Bianca. Mary Anne reaches out to Rocky, who reconciles with Adonis and agrees to train him for a rematch against Viktor, who is suffering torturous physical tests at Ivan's hands. Bianca gives birth to a daughter, Amara, and Rocky is named her godfather; Amara is born deaf, inheriting her lack of hearing from her mother's progressive hearing disorder.

While Viktor taunts Adonis publicly, he faces constant pressure from his father behind the scenes, who enjoys the attention of the media and various Russian delegates. At a state dinner, he and Ivan encounter Ludmilla, his mother and Ivan's ex-wife, for the first time in several years after she abandoned them following Ivan's loss to Rocky. Enraged at the sight of her, Viktor storms out of the dinner and chastises Ivan for seeking approval from those who cast them out. Meanwhile, Rocky and Little Duke retrain Adonis in a decrepit location in the California desert, focusing on fighting from within and training Adonis' body to absorb the heavy impact he will receive from Viktor in the ring.

In Moscow, the rematch is more balanced as a more controlled and focused Adonis exchanges equal blows with Viktor. Viktor is used to winning by knockout as his bouts have never lasted past four rounds; Adonis uses this to his advantage and willingly endures a heavy beating from Viktor, even after his ribs are broken. In the tenth round, Adonis unleashes sequences of effective blows on a now exhausted Viktor, leading to him knocking Viktor down twice. Ludmilla departs after the second knockdown, deeply upsetting Viktor, who loses the will to fight, and Ivan sees the truth of his son's earlier words. An exhausted Viktor is cornered and receives multiple strikes without defending himself, but is unwilling to go down. Finally realizing that his son's safety means more to him than revenge or acceptance from Russia's elite, Ivan throws in the towel, forfeiting the match to protect his son. He assures the distraught Viktor it is okay that he lost, and embraces him. As Bianca enters the ring to celebrate with Adonis, Little Duke, and Creed's other trainers, Rocky excuses himself and takes a seat to watch them from outside the ring.

Following the match, Viktor and Ivan later train together back in Ukraine. Rocky travels to Vancouver to make peace with his own estranged son, Robert Jr., and meets his grandson Logan for the first time. Adonis and Bianca visit Apollo's grave, where Adonis makes peace with his deceased father and the burden of carrying on his legacy, as he and Bianca introduce Amara, who now has a new set of hearing aids.

== Cast ==
- Michael B. Jordan as Adonis "Donnie" Creed: An underdog but talented heavyweight boxer, he is the son of world heavyweight champion Apollo Creed. His real name is Adonis Johnson, but he fights as Adonis Creed.
- Sylvester Stallone as Robert "Rocky" Balboa: A two-time world heavyweight champion and Apollo's best friend and former rival who becomes Adonis' avuncular trainer and mentor. He owns and operates an Italian restaurant in Philadelphia named after his deceased wife, Adrian. Creed II is Stallone's final appearance as Rocky, as he confirmed in an Instagram post in November 2018 that he would not portray the role any longer.
- Tessa Thompson as Bianca Taylor: Adonis' girlfriend, who becomes his fiancée and the mother of his child. She is also a singer-songwriter with progressive hearing loss.
- Phylicia Rashad as Mary Anne Creed: Apollo's widow and Adonis' stepmother, who took in Adonis as a child following the death of Adonis' biological mother.
- Dolph Lundgren as Captain Ivan Drago: Russia's former prize champion boxer, who, with the secret use of steroids and advanced training, gained worldwide attention due to his brute strength that had not been seen before. Years prior, he killed Apollo Creed during an exhibition boxing match, and was later defeated by Rocky. Having been disgraced in Russia, he relocated to Ukraine to raise his son Viktor, whom he also trained to box. Lundgren reprises his role from 1985's Rocky IV.
- Florian Munteanu as Viktor Drago: Ivan's son who is a burly and ruthless boxer, and Adonis' new rival.
- Wood Harris as Tony "Little Duke" Evers: One of Wheeler's trainers. His father, Tony "Duke" Evers, was a father-figure for Apollo as well as his trainer when Apollo became world heavyweight champion. He then became one of Rocky's trainers after Apollo's death. He trains Adonis for his fight with Viktor and later assists Rocky in training Adonis for his rematch with Viktor.
- Russell Hornsby as Buddy Marcelle: A boxing promoter who sets up the match between Adonis and Viktor.
- Milo Ventimiglia as Rocky Balboa Jr.: Rocky's estranged son, who moved to Vancouver in the period between Rocky Balboa (2006) and Creed and is now a father himself. Ventimiglia reprises his role from the former film.
- Andre Ward as Danny "Stuntman" Wheeler: A heavyweight boxer and Adonis' rival whom Adonis beats to become the heavyweight champion.
- Brigitte Nielsen as Ludmilla Vobet Drago: Ivan's ex-wife and Viktor's mother who left the pair during the latter's infancy. Nielsen also reprises her role from Rocky IV.

In addition, Robbie Johns appears briefly as Logan Balboa, Robert's son and Rocky's grandson. Archive footage of Carl Weathers as Apollo Creed is used throughout the film, with the actor's likeness also appearing through the use of photographs and murals.

== Production ==
=== Development and writing ===
On January 5, 2016, Sylvester Stallone and Metro-Goldwyn-Mayer CEO Gary Barber confirmed to Variety that a sequel to Creed was in development. That month, Stallone posed the possibility of Milo Ventimiglia reprising his role as Rocky's son Robert Balboa from Rocky Balboa. Ventimiglia had revealed during the development of Creed that he was open to returning to the franchise, stating, "I'll tell you what, if they invited me, I'd love to be there. If they didn't, I wouldn't be offended." It was revealed in April 2018 that he had been cast. On January 11, 2016, Barber revealed that Ryan Coogler would not be returning due to scheduling conflicts with Black Panther, though he would return as executive producer. Michael B. Jordan was paid between $3 and $4 million, and his schedule was delayed by starring in Black Panther. In July 2017, Stallone confirmed that he had completed the script, and that Ivan Drago would be featured. In October 2017, it was announced that Stallone would direct and produce the film. However, in December 2017, it was reported that Steven Caple Jr. would instead direct the film with Tessa Thompson confirmed to reprise her role of Bianca, Creed's love interest. In January 2018, Romanian amateur boxer Florian Munteanu was cast as Drago's son, and Dolph Lundgren to reprise his role of Drago. In March 2018, Russell Hornsby joined the cast and Phylicia Rashad, Wood Harris, and Andre Ward were confirmed to reprise their roles from the prior film.

Vince DiCola, composer of Rocky IV, was originally rumored to return to score the film, but stated in a Facebook post: "I would have loved to return, however that's just how Hollywood works. We don't always get what we want."

=== Filming ===
Principal photography began March 2018. Filming occurred in Philadelphia, Pennsylvania, in the city's Port Richmond neighborhood, and was completed on June 7, 2018. Some scenes were filmed at the Grey Towers Castle at Arcadia University in Glenside, Pennsylvania. The Hospital scenes were filmed at Temple University Hospital's Boyer Pavilion at Broad and Tioga Streets.

=== Visual effects ===
The visual effects were provided by Zero VFX and Mr. X and Supervised by Eric Robinson, Dan Cayer, and Crystal Dowd with the help of Crafty Apes.

== Release ==
=== Theatrical ===
Creed II premiered on November 14, 2018, at the Lincoln Center for the Performing Arts in New York City. It was released in the United States by MGM on November 21, 2018. It was released internationally in some countries by Warner Bros. Pictures

On December 21, 2018, it was announced the film would receive a January 4, 2019, release in China, the first Rocky film to ever receive a theatrical release in the country.

== Reception ==
=== Box office ===
Creed II grossed $115.7 million in the United States and Canada, and $98.4 million in other territories, for a total worldwide gross of $214.1 million, against a production budget of $50 million.

In the United States and Canada, Creed II was released alongside Ralph Breaks the Internet and Robin Hood, and the wide expansion of Green Book, and was projected to gross $44–54 million from 3,350 theaters in its five-day opening weekend. The film made $11.6 million on its first day, including $3.7 million from Tuesday night previews (the second best pre-Thanksgiving total ever behind fellow release Ralph Breaks the Internet's $3.8 million and marking a 64% improvement over the first film's $1.4 million preview total). It went on to debut to $35.3 million in its opening weekend (a five-day total of $55.8 million), finishing second at the box office and marking the best Thanksgiving opening for a live-action film, besting Enchanted ($49.1 million) and Four Christmases ($46.1 million). In its second and third weekends the film made $16.8 million and $10 million, finishing in third both times. Over the five-day Christmas frame (its fifth week of release), the film passed the $109.7 million domestic total made by the first film.

=== Critical response ===
On review aggregator Rotten Tomatoes, the film holds an approval rating of 83% based on 312 reviews, with an average rating of 6.9/10. The website's critical consensus reads, "Creed II's adherence to franchise formula adds up to a sequel with few true surprises, but its time-tested generational themes still pack a solid punch." On Metacritic, the film has a weighted average score of 66 out of 100, based on reviews from 45 critics, indicating "favorable reviews". Audiences polled by CinemaScore gave the film an average grade of "A" on an A+ to F scale, the same score earned by its predecessor, and PostTrak reported filmgoers gave it an 87% positive score and an 89% "definite recommend".

Odie Henderson of RogerEbert.com gave the film three out of four stars, stating that "Creed II falls victim to the sins of sequelitis—it's bigger, louder and more grandiose than its predecessor—yet manages to right itself by not losing focus on the humanity of its central characters." Owen Gleiberman of Variety called the film "rousing and effective" and wrote "Creed II has been made with heart and skill, and Jordan invests each moment with such fierce conviction that he makes it all seem like it matters. Even if it all mattered a notable notch more in Creed." Eric Kohn of IndieWire gave the film a "B", praising Stallone's performance and saying: "Kramer Morgenthau's cinematography lacks the showy steadicam acrobatics of Creed, but the climactic battle between Adonis and Viktor still delivers a dazzling light show that dovetails right into the visceral mayhem of the battle, captured from so many angles some viewers may reel from the punches themselves."

== Sequel ==
In response to the suggestion that Deontay Wilder could play the son of Clubber Lang in a potential Creed III, both Sylvester Stallone and Michael B. Jordan expressed interest in such a character being featured in the plot of the next installment. In February 2020, Zach Baylin was announced as the sequel's writer. In October 2020, it was reported that Michael B. Jordan would reprise his role of Adonis Creed, and have his directorial debut. Jordan was confirmed as the director of Creed III in March 2021, with a targeted release date of March 3, 2023, and Stallone confirmed in April that he would not appear as Rocky Balboa.

As of July 2019, the Rocky franchise as a whole was announced to continue with another mentor-student film like Creed and set after Creed II, in which Rocky Balboa befriends a young fighter who is also an illegal immigrant. Stallone stated: "Rocky meets a young, angry person who got stuck in this country when he comes to see his sister. He takes him into his life, and unbelievable adventures begin, and they wind up south of the border. It's very, very timely." In addition he announced the development of a Rocky prequel television series.

== See also ==
- List of boxing films
