= Messianic Jewish Theological Institute =

American graduate school of religion

The Messianic Jewish Theological Institute (MJTI) is an online graduate school based out of San Diego, California established by the Union of Messianic Jewish Congregations (UMJC) in 2002. It seeks to train rabbis, leaders, and laity by providing them with a unique Messianic Jewish education.

== Mission statement ==
MJTI's mission statement is as follows:

"Teaching and living a prophetic vision of Jewish life renewed in Yeshua.

"Messianic Jewish Theological Institute (MJTI) seeks to be a prophetic sign of Israel’s destiny by exemplifying and advancing Jewish life renewed in Yeshua. This foretaste of Israel’s destiny in Yeshua is realized as MJTI serves as the theological and prophetic vision center for the Messianic Jewish community; a leadership-training center rooted in a contemporary Jewish experience of Yeshua and a contemporary Messianic interpretation of Judaism; a dialogue center for open and respectful theological encounter between faithful Christians and Jews; and a Jewish school born in the diaspora but oriented to Israel."

== Programs ==
MJTI offers master's degrees, certificate tracks, and short courses.

=== Rabbinic Studies Program ===
The Rabbinic Studies Program offers a 90-credit Master's of Rabbinic Studies to both Jewish men and women. The degree program prepares students for smicha (ordination) as a Rabbi. There are four elements to the program:

- Online coursework
- Mentoring
- Residential intensives
- Humanitarian service project

These additional requirements prepare students for the interpersonal challenges of spiritual leadership in addition to the theological knowledge required.

=== Jewish Studies Program ===
The Jewish Studies Program offers a 54-credit Master's of Jewish Studies. The degree program exposes students to Jewish Studies from a Messianic Jewish context.

==== Certificate Tracks ====
The Jewish Studies Program also houses Certificate Tracks. Each Certificate is a unit of three classes (one each quarter, making each Certificate one academic year long) on discrete and various topics. They are designed for students wishing to study theology and other subjects at an advanced level without committing to an entire degree.

=== Panim-el-Panim Short Courses ===
MJTI offers short courses every month during the academic school year. These courses are open to anyone in the community, with no prerequisites or application process needed. Each course is on a different topic and offers learning at a less advanced level and with less commitment than the Certificate Tracks.

== Admissions requirements ==
=== To the Rabbinic Studies or Jewish Studies Programs ===
To apply for the Rabbinic Studies or Jewish Studies Program, an applicant must submit the following:

- Completion of MJTI application for admission
- Graduation from a four-year, accredited college
- Two letters of recommendation
- Admissions interview

Students must pass a Hebrew language proficiency test, or take a year-long Biblical Hebrew series through MJTI to satisfy this requirement.

==== Mature Student Status Admission ====
Students without a degree from a four-year institution but with experience in biblical studies may apply for the Jewish Studies Program or Certificate Programs. An applicant must submit the following:

- Completion of MJTI application for admission
- Two letters of recommendation
- Admissions interview

Students must be at least 30 years old and complete the Introduction to Messianic Jewish Studies certificate.

==== Student-At-Large ====
Students who wish to study at MJTI without enrolling in a degree program may apply to the Jewish Studies Program as a Student-At-Large. An applicant must submit the following:

- Completion of MJTI application for admission
- Graduation from a four-year, accredited college
- Letter of recommendation
- Admissions interview

== Notable faculty and staff ==
=== Faculty ===
- David J. Rudolph (Ph.D. New Testament, Cambridge University; M.A. Old Testament, Gordon-Conwell Theological Seminary; M.A. Biblical Languages, Gordon-Conwell Theological Seminary)
- Stuart Dauermann (Ph.D. Intercultural Studies, Fuller Seminary)
- David Friedman (Ph.D. Near Eastern Studies, California Graduate School of Theology)
- Vered Hillel (Ph.D. 2nd Temple Period Judaism, Hebrew University of Jerusalem)
- Mark Kinzer (Ph.D. Near Eastern Studies, University of Michigan)
- Carl Kinbar (DLitt. et Phil. Early Judaism, University of South Africa)
- Jennifer Rosner (Ph.D. Systematic Theology, Fuller Theological Seminary)

=== Administration ===
- Elliot Klayman — MJTI COO
- Rabbi Vered Hillel — MJTI Academic Dean
- Rabbi Paul Saal — MJTI Dean of Students
- Joyce Klayman — MJTI Business Manager

=== Board of Directors ===
- Rabbi Rich Nichol — MJTI President
- Rabbi Walter Lieber — Treasurer
- Rabbi Russell Resnik — Secretary
- James Klein
- Diane Cohen
- Jon Cline

=== Founding President ===
- Emeritus President Mark Kinzer
