= Mark Kinzer =

American author and theologian

Mark Kinzer (born 1952) is an American Messianic Jewish cleric, author, and theologian.

== Early life and education ==
Mark Kinzer was born in Detroit, Michigan, in 1952 to a Conservative Jewish family. He became a Messianic Jew in 1971.

Kinzer attended the University of Michigan as an undergraduate and graduate student. He earned a PhD in Near Eastern Studies from the University of Michigan in 1995.

== Career ==
In 1997, Kinzer co-founded Hashivenu, a Messianic Jewish movement that seeks a more serious engagement with the Jewish intellectual tradition. Hashivenu advocates for engagement with post-Biblical Rabbinic literature and discarding certain post-scriptural Christian writings deemed irrelevant. Kinzer has served as the chair of Hashivenu since 2000.

Kinzer was ordained as a Messianic Jewish cleric by the Union of Messianic Jewish Congregations in 2001. He was one of the founding members of the Messianic Jewish Rabbinical Council in 2006.

Kinzer has taught at the University of Michigan, Michigan State University, and Fuller Theological Seminary. He is president-emeritus and senior scholar at the Messianic Jewish Theological Institute, a graduate and Messianic Jewish clergy training institute that he founded in 2002.

He is founder and rabbi emeritus of Congregation Zera Avraham, a Messianic synagogue in Ann Arbor, Michigan, and led the congregation from 1993 to 2018.

=== Theology ===
Kinzer is an advocate for a Torah-observant Messianic Judaism engaged with Jewish tradition and heritage, as opposed to more evangelical strands.

In 2005, he published Post-Missionary Messianic Judaism: Redefining Christian Engagement with the Jewish People, which seeks to refute supersessionist theology. Kinzer coined the term "bilateral ecclesiology", expressing the idea that the Christian Church is made up of two distinct but united Jewish and Gentile bodies, as God's covenant with the Jewish people is everlasting and cannot be broken. Kinzer therefore argues Jewish law and practice is still binding for Jews. While believing in Jesus, Jewish people should maintain a separate religious and national identity without assimilation.

Messianic Jewish congregations have a long history of cooperation with Jewish evangelistic organizations like Jews for Jesus and Chosen People Ministries, but Kinzer's 2005 book Post-Missionary Messianic Judaism provided a theological basis for Messianic Jews to distance themselves from the more overt forms of Christian outreach to Jews. While some reviews of the book were positive, others were more critical.

Kinzer is also known for his dialogue with the Catholic Church. He presented a paper at the Messianic Jewish-Roman Catholic Dialogue Group in Vienna in 2008 which was adapted into a First Things essay.

Kinzer's theology has been explored by Catholic priest Antoine Lévy in his 2021 book Jewish Church: A Catholic Approach to Messianic Judaism.

== Legacy ==
Kinzer has been described as one of the major thinkers and innovators in the Messianic Jewish movement, especially in regard to supersessionism and ecclesiology.

In 2023, Kinzer was honored with a Festschrift that included 24 essays written by colleagues and friends.

In 2026, Kinzer received an honorary doctorate from the University of Fribourg.

== Works ==
- Stones the Builders Rejected: The Jewish Jesus, His Jewish Disciples, and the Culmination of History, edited by Jennifer M. Rosner, Cascade Books, 2024.
- Besorah: The Resurrection of Jerusalem and the Healing of a Fractured Gospel with Russell Resnik, Cascade Books, 2021
- Jerusalem Crucified, Jerusalem Risen: The Resurrected Messiah, the Jewish People, and the Land of Promise, Cascade Books, 2018
- Taming the Tongue, First Fruit of Zion, 2015
- Searching Her Own Mystery: Nostra Aetate, the Jewish People, and the Identity of the Church, Cascade Books, 2015
- Israel's Messiah and the People of God: A Vision for Messianic Jewish Covenant Fidelity, Cascade Books, 2011
- Postmissionary Messianic Judaism: Redefining Christian Engagement with the Jewish People, Brazos Press, 2005
