= HNoMS Troll =

Two ships of the Royal Norwegian Navy have borne the name HNoMS Troll, after the Norse mythological creature Troll:

- HNoMS Troll (1910) was a Draug-class destroyer launched in 1910 and scrapped in 1949.
- HNoMS Troll (1956) was an ex-Canadian River-class frigate loaned to the Royal Norwegian Navy in 1956 and bought in 1959.
