= Rolf Lidberg =

Swedish artist and botanist (1930–2005)

Rolf Lidberg Jonas (May 26, 1930 in Järkvissle, Sweden – 15 February 2005) was a Swedish artist and botanist, best known for his watercolor paintings and books with paintings of trolls depicting their life near Sweden's Indal river. In his illustrations, his trolls were very human, and usually occupied with something in nature, such as berry or mushroom picking, fishing, or gazing up in the sky. His books have been translated into 12 different languages.

Lidberg's main interest was botany, especially orchids and fungi. He was also a founder of a local mycological society in 1970, traveled around Europe to paint and draw vegetation, and spent long periods in Sicily, where he became an honorary citizen of the city Geraci Siculo.

Lidberg was known for having been hunchbacked, with a large beard, closely resembling the trolls that he frequently illustrated. He even named one of his famous troll illustrations "Self-Portrait." In the early 1980s, Swedish national television channel SVT broadcast a series of three programs on Rolf Lidberg, titled, "A Man and His Flowers."
