= Troll (2022 film) =

Norwegian film by Roar Uthaug

- Promotional release poster
- Directed by: Roar Uthaug
- Screenplay by: Espen Aukan
- Story by: Roar Uthaug
- Produced by: Espen Horn; Kristian Strand Sinkerud
- Starring: Ine Marie Wilmann; Kim Falck; Mads Sjøgård Pettersen; Gard B. Eidsvold
- Cinematography: Jallo Faber
- Edited by: Christoffer Heie; Jens Peder Hertzberg
- Music by: Johannes Ringen
- Production company: Motion Blur
- Distributed by: Netflix
- Release date: 1 December 2022
- Running time: 101 minutes
- Country: Norway
- Language: Norwegian

Troll is a 2022 Norwegian epic monster film directed by Roar Uthaug, written by Espen Auken, and starring Ine Marie Wilmann, Kim Falck, Mads Sjøgård Pettersen, and Gard B. Eidsvold. It tells the story of a ragtag group of people who must come together to stop an ancient giant troll that was awakened in a Norwegian mountain and prevent it from wreaking havoc.

Director Uthaug met with Motion Blur executives when his film Tomb Raider was near completion to discuss creating a film. He decided to utilize a Norwegian folklore-inspired idea that he had been pondering for over 20 years. The concept art of the titular monster attacking Oslo was released in March 2021. Principal photography began in August 2021 and wrapped in November, with location shooting taking place in Askim, Dovre, Indre Østfold, Lom, Øyer, Rena, and Ulsteinvik.

Troll was released by Netflix on 1 December 2022, to generally positive reviews from critics. A sequel, Troll 2, was released in 2025.

== Plot ==
As a young girl, Nora Tidemann listens to her father Tobias narrating the mythology of trolls and the origin of their local mountains. During one story, Nora almost "sees" the faces of trolls turned to stone in the rock face.

Years later, a drilling operation tunneling through the mountains of Dovre Municipality results in an eruption and the deaths of several workers and protestors. Desperate for answers, the Norwegian government recruits a diverse array of scientists, including Nora, who is now a paleontologist on her first major find. While the collected scientists initially believe that the eruption was caused by the miners hitting a pocket of methane, only Nora and the prime minister's advisor, Andreas Isaksan, point out that the region is surrounded by large impressions that appear to be footprints. The prime minister permits them to investigate the possibility further with Norwegian soldier, Captain Kris Holm from the FSK, when a second incident miles away tears apart the home of an elderly couple near Lesja.

Nora begins to believe that a troll may be responsible and the three seek assistance from Tobias, who has since lost his professorship for his belief in the existence of a real basis for mythical creatures. After a quick search of the mountains, Tobias identifies a topographical anomaly and the four accidentally awaken the slumbering 164 ft (50 m) troll, having camouflaged itself on the mountainside. They escape, capturing the first tangible video proof of Nora's theory.

The prime minister arranges a military operation led by Kris, but conventional weapons only annoy the troll. Tobias tries communicating with the troll, but is killed when the creature is startled by more gunfire. Researching the mythology, Nora recommends a sonic attack using church bells, but it enrages the creature instead of incapacitating it, causing immense collateral damage. Following the rampage, international news outlets pick up the story and broadcast it globally.

As the troll heads to Norway's capital Oslo, the prime minister orders a complete evacuation of the city. After learning of the government's plan to destroy the troll with a nuclear strike on Oslo, Nora and Andreas object, but are dismissed from the task force. Nora makes a last attempt to find out the truth about the creature. Tobias' notes lead them to the Royal Palace, where they meet Chief of Court Rikard Sinding, who reveals the truth about trolls in Norway. Tobias had been right all along; trolls had been living in Norway until they were wiped out by Christian settlers led by King Olaf and the truth buried in folklore. When Nora's father got too close to the truth, Sinding had him discredited and committed to a mental health hospital. The Royal Palace was built on top of the Troll King's palace after the Christians massacred his family and left him for dead inside a cavern in the Dovre mountains after luring him with his kidnapped child. Nora concludes that the creature is heading for Oslo in an attempt to return home.

Discovering that trolls are vulnerable to direct sunlight, Nora and Kris plan to expose the troll to UV light from a number of tanning beds. While Kris calls on fellow soldiers to make the troll trap, Andreas asks his friend Sigrid at the secret government facility to delay the bombing of Oslo. Sigrid hacks into the military's system to halt the nuclear strike. Nora and Andreas place the skull of one of the troll's babies in the back of the Queen's truck and lure him to the UV light trap. Nora has a last-minute change of heart, turns off the lights, and tries to save the creature's life. However, the sun then rises into a clear sky and kills the troll. While everyone else rejoices, Andreas and Nora wonder if more trolls are still alive deep inside Norway's mountains.

In the mid-credits, something seems to emerge with a roar from the rubble inside the Dovre mountain cave.

== Cast ==
- Ine Marie Wilmann as Nora Tidemann, a paleontologist
  - Ameli Olving Sælevik as young Nora Tidemann
- Kim Falck as Andreas Isaksen, a worker at the Prime Minister's office
- Mads Sjøgård Pettersen as Captain Kristoffer Holm, a military member who befriends Nora and Andreas
- Gard B. Eidsvold as Tobias Tidemann, the father of Nora
- Anneke von der Lippe as Berit Moberg, the Prime Minister of Norway
- Fridtjov Såheim as Frederick Markussen, the Minister of Defence
- Dennis Storhøi as Sverre Lunde, the Chief of Defence who is the commanding officer of Kristoffer
- Karoline Viktoria Sletteng Garvang as Sigrid Hodne, a worker at the Department of Defence who is friends with Andreas
- Yusuf Toosh Ibra as Amir Aw-Geedi
- Bjarne Hjelde as Rikard Sinding, the Chief of Court at Oslo's Royal Palace who knows Tobias
- Jon Ketil Johnsen as Professor Møller
- Duc Paul Mai-The as Professor Wangel
- Ingrid Vollan as Oddrun Gundersen, a woman whose house was flattened by the troll
- Trond Magnum as Lars Gundersen, the husband of Oddrun whose house was flattened by the troll
- Pål Richard Lunderby as Fisker
- Eric Vorenholt as an OPS officer
- Hugo Mikal Skår as a helicopter pilot

=== English dub ===
- Emily Goss as Professor Nora Tidemann
  - Ava Faust as young Nora Tidemann
- Kieran Regan as Anreas Isaksen
- Austen Moret as Captain Kristoffer Holm
- Richard Cansino as Tobias Tidemann
- Edie Mirman as Berit Moberg
- Sean Burgo as Frederick Markussen
- David St. James as CSverre Lunde
- Sophie Simpson as Sigrid Hodne
- Ian Casselberry as Amir Aw-Geedi
- Carrie Madsen as Oddrun Gunderson
- Michael Bell as Lars Gunderson
- Jesse Corti as Professor Møller
- Alan Lee as Professor Wangel
- Enzo de Angelis as Viktor
- Brett Calo as Victor's father
- Danny Feshenfeld as Piranha
- Avrielle Corti as Additional voices

== Production ==
=== Development ===
Roar Uthaug met with Motion Blur executives when his film Tomb Raider was near completion to discuss creating a film. Uthaug decided to utilize a Norwegian folklore-inspired idea that he had been pondering for more than two decades.

News website TheWrap officially announced Troll on 25 August 2020, with an article featuring a synopsis, and a statement from Uthaug. In March 2021, Bloody Disgusting revealed concept art of the titular monster attacking Oslo. In January 2022, David Kosse of Netflix described the film as "a giant four-quadrant event movie that happens to take place in Norway... with a troll."

=== Filming ===
Principal photography for Troll began in August 2021 and wrapped in November, with location shooting taking place in Askim, Dovre, Indre Østfold, Lom, Øyer, Rena, and Ulsteinvik.

=== Music ===
The music for Troll was written by Johannes Ringen.

== Release ==
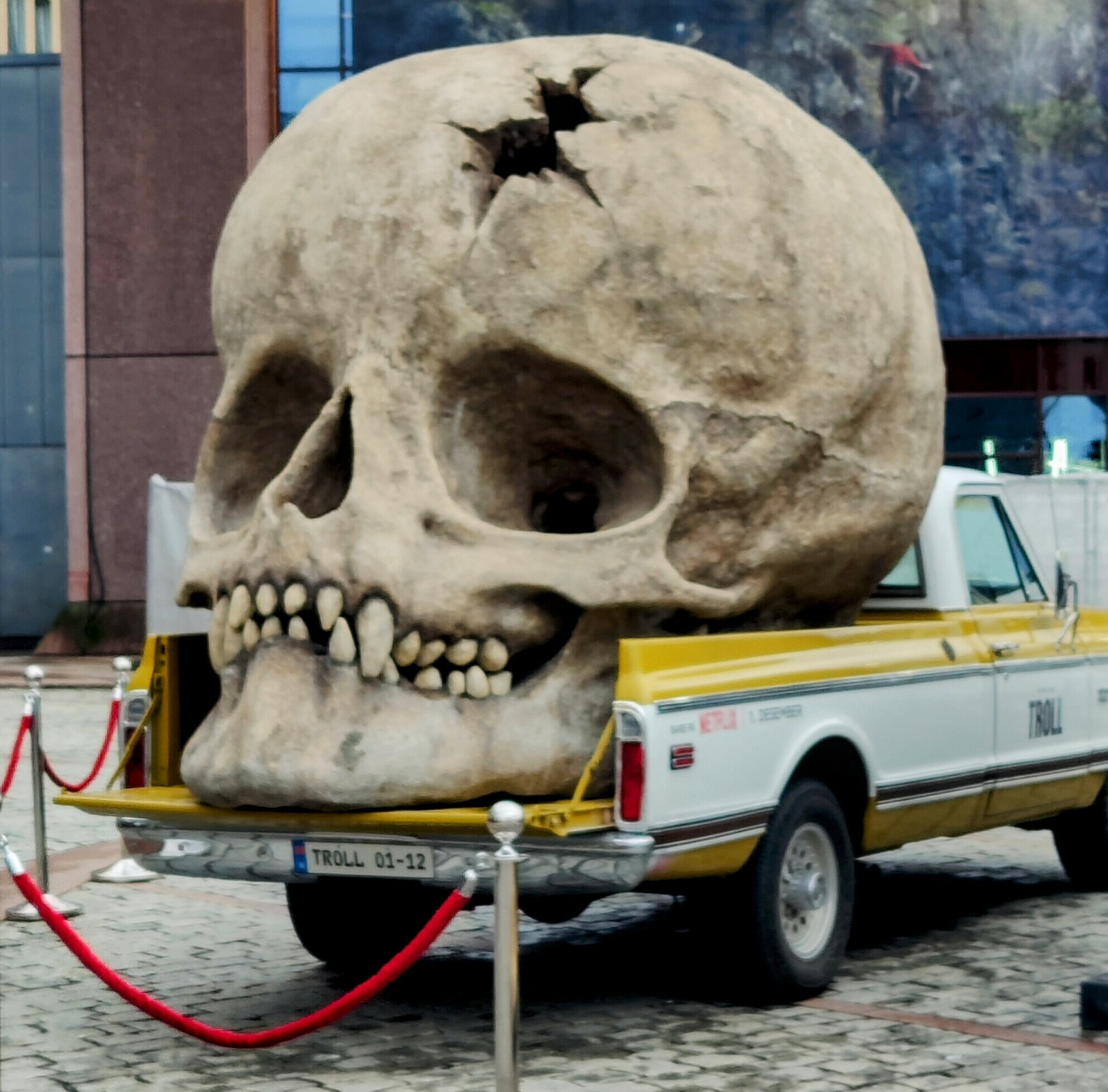
Promotional installation at Oslo Central Station in late November 2022

Troll was distributed by Netflix on 1 December 2022.

== Reception ==
=== Critical response ===
On the review aggregator website Rotten Tomatoes, 90% of 30 critics' reviews are positive, with an average rating of 6.5/10. The website's consensus reads: "Troll doesn't rewrite the monster movie rulebooks — but with mythology this rich and action this exciting, it doesn't have to." Metacritic, which uses a weighted average, assigned the film a score of 62 out of 100, based on 4 critics, indicating "generally favorable" reviews.

Critics deemed the story of a giant monster that wreaks havoc in a populous city derivative of Godzilla and King Kong films. Marco Vito Oddo of Collider gave it a rating of C+, writing that while its "not getting any awards for originality" it nevertheless "delivers what it promises by telling a story about a giant creature that destroys cities in its waking [sic] and the humans who try to prevent catastrophe." Michael Gingold, writing for Rue Morgue, said that "clearly, Uthaug is not taking all this entirely seriously, but he never pitches [the film] as a spoof," adding: "he takes spectacle seriously–even when at least one of the operations enacted to subdue the titan border [sic] on the downright goofy–and to that end, the visual effects of the troll and its devastation are first-rate, both out in rural areas, including a great reveal that's unfortunately given away in the trailer, and in the midst of the city of Oslo." South China Morning Post reviewer James Marsh felt that despite the fact that "the effects work is first-rate and the action efficiently handled", the film features a "frustrating lack of Scandinavian specificity on display, with Uthaug more eager to emulate blockbusters like Jurassic Park and Godzilla than introduce international viewers to his homeland’s unique folkloric threats."

Bloody Disgusting's Meagan Navarro felt that "what Troll lacks in originality, it makes up for in fresh mythology", and concluded "it's fun enough and does deliver on spectacle, but most of all, it leaves you rooting for its magnificent creature." Screen Anarchy critic Peter Martin commented "the movie feels faintly familiar," adding: "while refreshingly different, featuring new wrinkles that are well-considered and profoundly satisfying."

== Sequel ==
On September 19, 2023, Variety reported that Netflix had instructed the crew to create a sequel to the film. Filming on Troll 2 began in 2024 with Roar Uthaug and Espen Aukan returning as director and writer. Troll 2 was released on Netflix on December 1, 2025.
