= David J. Rudolph =

American religious scholar and messianic leader

David J. Rudolph (born 1967) is an American scholar and Director of Messianic Jewish Studies at The King's University, who has written books and articles on the New Testament, Second Temple Judaism, Messianic Jews, intermarriage, and Jewish-Christian relations. His work A Jew to the Jews: Jewish Contours of Pauline Flexibility in 1 Corinthians 9:19-23 won the 2007 Franz Delitzsch Prize from the Freie Theologische Akademie. Rudolph is also a lecturer in New Testament at Messianic Jewish Theological Institute’s School of Jewish Studies and a fellow at the MJTI Center for Jewish-Christian Relations.

== Life and career ==
David Rudolph (Ph.D., Cambridge University) was born and raised in the greater Washington, D.C. area. After receiving M.A. degrees in Old Testament and Biblical Languages from Gordon-Conwell Theological Seminary in South Hamilton, Massachusetts (1999–2002), Rudolph completed a Ph.D. in New Testament at the University of Cambridge under the supervision of Markus Bockmuehl (2002–2007). He went on to serve as director of the School of Jewish Studies at the Messianic Jewish Theological Institute in Los Angeles and scholar-in-residence at the MJTI Center for Jewish-Christian Relations (2008–2011). In 2015 he became Director of Messianic Jewish Studies at The King's University.

Rudolph's work A Jew to the Jews: Jewish Contours of Pauline Flexibility in 1 Corinthians 9:19-23 won the 2007 Franz Delitzsch Prize from the Freie Theologische Akademie in Germany. A review by Robert S. Dutch in the Journal for the Study of the New Testament described the book "a must-read for reconsidering Paul as a Torah-observant Jew and his relationship with Gentiles." J. Brian Tucker's review in the Journal of Beliefs and Values described the book as "a seminal work among New Testament scholars engaged in post-supersessionist interpretation." A review by Jacob Fronczak in Messiah Journal described the book as "one of only a few scholarly contributions by practicing Messianic Jews to the ongoing Jewish/Christian dialogue on Paul."

He served as the rabbi of Shulchan Adonai Messianic Synagogue in Annapolis, Maryland from 1990-1996. He was the rabbi of Tikvat Israel Messianic Synagogue in Richmond, Virginia from 2011-2015. Currently Rudolph is Professor of New Testament and Jewish Studies at The King’s University. Rudolph is also a lecturer in New Testament at the MJTI School of Jewish Studies. As a scholar of Jewish-Christian relations, he has also advocated for the inclusion of Messianic Jews in Jewish-Christian dialogue.

== Awards ==
- Franz Delitzsch Prize (2011) from the Freie Theologische Akademie in Germany for A Jew to the Jews: Jewish Contours of Pauline Flexibility in 1 Corinthians 9:19-23. ISBN 978-3161492938

== Selected bibliography ==
=== Books ===
- Introduction to Messianic Judaism: Its Ecclesial Context and Biblical Foundations. Edited by David Rudolph and Joel Willitts. Grand Rapids: Zondervan, 2013. ISBN 978-0310330639
- A Jew to the Jews: Jewish Contours of Pauline Flexibility in 1 Corinthians 9:19-23. Tübingen: Mohr Siebeck, 2011. ISBN 978-3161492938
- Growing Your Olive Tree Marriage: A Guide for Couples from Two Traditions. Baltimore: Lederer, 2003. ISBN 978-1880226179
- The Voice of the Lord: Messianic Jewish Daily Devotional. Baltimore: Lederer, 1998. ISBN 978-1880226704

=== Articles ===
- "Paul's 'Rule in All the Churches' (1 Cor 7:17-24) and Torah-Defined Ecclesiological Variegation." Studies in Christian-Jewish Relations 5 (2010): 1-23.
- "History of Judeo-Christian Communities in the Jewish Diaspora." Pages 136-39 in Encyclopedia of the Jewish Diaspora: Origins, Experiences, and Culture. 1. Edited by M. Avrum Ehrlich. Santa Barbara: ABC-CLIO, 2008. ISBN 978-1851098736
- "Messianic Jews and Christian Theology: Restoring an Historical Voice to the Contemporary Discussion." Pro Ecclesia 14:1 (2005): 58-84.
- "Festivals in Genesis 1:14." Tyndale Bulletin 54:2 (2003): 23-40.
- "Jesus and the Food Laws: A Reassessment of Mark 7:19b." Evangelical Quarterly 74:4 (2002): 291-311.
