= The King's University (Texas) =

Private Christian university

- Former names: The King's College and Seminary
- Type: Private university
- Established: 1997
- Founder: Jack W. Hayford
- Religious affiliation: Christian
- President: Irini Fambro
- Students: 650
- Location: 2121 E Southlake Blvd, Southlake, Texas, United States; 32.939603°N 97.121510°W
- Colors: Purple
- Website: www.tku.edu

The King's University is a private Christian university and seminary in Southlake, Texas, United States.

== History ==
Prior to the university's establishment, The Church On The Way, led by Jack W. Hayford, operated an internal education program since the 1970's known as The School On The Way, which offered courses in biblical studies, theology, and ministry. Some coursework from this program was transferable to accredited ministry institutions.

The institution began offering classes in September 1997 under the name The King's College and Seminary, providing undergraduate and graduate theological education. Instruction initially took place in Van Nuys, California (San Fernando Valley). The university expanded its academic offerings during its early years, including the development of distance-learning programs and an academic library.

In 1999, The King's College and Seminary entered the accreditation process with nationally recognized Christian accrediting agencies. The institution later achieved initial accreditation. In 2010, it was renamed The King's University.

During the 2000s, The King's University expanded through extension campuses operated in partnership with local churches. In 2009, the university partnered with Gateway Church in Southlake, Texas, to establish a branch campus. Following institutional planning and board approval, the university relocated its primary campus operations from California to Southlake, Texas, completing the transition in January 2014.

== Accreditation ==
The King's University is accredited by the Transnational Association of Christian Colleges and Schools at the Category IV level and by the Association for Biblical Higher Education. Both the Transnational Association of Christian Colleges and Schools and the Association of Biblical Higher Education are members of the Council for Higher Education Accreditation.

The university's seminary is accredited by the Commission on Accrediting of the Association of Theological Schools and is approved to offer the following degrees: Master of Divinity, Master of Practical Theology, Master of Organizational Leadership, and Doctor of Ministry. Additionally, The King's Seminary has received approval for its comprehensive distance education.
