= Brunnmigi =

Creature in Norse mythology

In Norse mythology, a Brunnmigi (Old Norse "pees in a well") is a being who defiles wells encountered by King Hjörleifr in Hálfs saga ok Hálfsrekka and, as recorded in the Prose Edda þulur, is also a kenning applied to foxes. It is a large beast.
