= Tomb Raider (film) =

2018 film by Roar Uthaug

- Theatrical release poster
- Directed by: Roar Uthaug
- Screenplay by: Geneva Robertson-Dworet; Alastair Siddons
- Story by: Evan Daugherty; Geneva Robertson-Dworet
- Based on: Tomb Raider by Square Enix
- Produced by: Graham King
- Starring: Alicia Vikander; Dominic West; Walton Goggins; Daniel Wu; Kristin Scott Thomas
- Cinematography: George Richmond
- Edited by: Stuart Baird; Michael Tronick; Tom Harrison-Read
- Music by: Tom Holkenborg
- Production companies: Warner Bros. Pictures; Metro-Goldwyn-Mayer Pictures; GK Films; Square Enix
- Distributed by: Warner Bros. Pictures
- Release dates: March 2, 2018 (Berlin); March 14, 2018 (UK); March 16, 2018 (US)
- Running time: 118 minutes
- Countries: United Kingdom; United States
- Language: English
- Budget: $90–106 million
- Box office: $275 million

Tomb Raider is a 2018 action-adventure film directed by Roar Uthaug and written by Geneva Robertson-Dworet and Alastair Siddons, based on the Tomb Raider video game series. An American and British co-production, it is served as a reboot and the third installment in the Tomb Raider film series, which was primarily inspired by the 2013 video game with some elements of its 2015 sequel Rise of the Tomb Raider. The film stars Alicia Vikander as Lara Croft, who embarks on a perilous journey to her father's last-known destination, hoping to solve the mystery of his disappearance. Dominic West, Walton Goggins, Daniel Wu, and Kristin Scott Thomas appear in supporting roles.

Principal photography took place from January to June 2017 at Warner Bros. Studios Leavesden in Hertfordshire, England, and Cape Town, South Africa. The film was also shot on location across London, particularly East London. Tomb Raider was released by Warner Bros. Pictures in the United Kingdom on March 14, 2018, and in the United States two days later. The film received mixed reviews from critics and grossed $275 million worldwide, a figure considered its break-even point.

A sequel was initially in development with Vikander set to return, but was cancelled in 2022 after producer Metro-Goldwyn-Mayer's rights to the Tomb Raider series expired, while Vikander stepped down from the role. Another reboot film, set to be part of a shared universe that will include a television series and a video game, is in development at Amazon MGM Studios.

== Plot ==
Following the disappearance of her father, Lord Richard Croft, Lara Croft makes a living as a bike courier. She is arrested after a collision with a police car. Richard's business partner, Ana Miller, posts her bail and urges Lara to accept her inheritance. Lara believes her father is still alive, but Ana warns Lara that the family estate, Croft Manor, will be sold off if she does not claim her inheritance. Lara reluctantly accepts and gains access to a secret chamber in her father's tomb, where she finds a pre-recorded video message from Richard detailing his research into Himiko, the mythical Queen of Yamatai who was said to command the power over life and death. Richard warns Lara to destroy his research, but instead she investigates further.

Not yet receiving her inheritance, Lara is forced to pawn the jade pendant her father gave her. With the money, Lara travels to Hong Kong where she hires Lu Ren, captain of the ship Endurance, to sail into the Devil's Sea and the island of Yamatai. The ship capsizes in a violent storm, and Lara washes ashore, where she is knocked unconscious. She awakens only to encounter Mathias Vogel, the leader of an expedition to locate Himiko's tomb. The expedition has been funded by a shadowy organization called Trinity, which seeks to harness and weaponize Himiko's power. Mathias takes Lara prisoner, claiming that he killed her father and revealing that he intends to use Richard's research to continue his expedition, and adding Lara and Lu to his slave force. The two of them try to escape, but only Lara succeeds.

After surviving rapids and narrowly avoiding falling over a waterfall with the wreck of a wartime airplane, Lara reunites with her father, who is revealed to be alive and staying on the island to prevent Trinity from finding Himiko's tomb. Despite his protests, Lara sets out the next morning to steal Mathias' satellite phone. Lara makes contact with Lu, and he, along with the other slaves, stages a distraction that allows Lara to infiltrate the Trinity camp and take the phone. In the ensuing chaos, Richard makes his way to Himiko's tomb but is captured by Mathias, who forces Lara to open the tomb, something she has prepared for since she was a child. At that point, the entrance to the tomb self-destructs and falls away, allowing them to enter the tomb, which has not been seen for over two thousand years.

The party navigates a series of booby traps and locates Himiko's sarcophagus. When a Trinity soldier attempts to remove her corpse, he is infected by a highly infectious pathogen that turns him into an aggressive necrotic zombie. Lara realizes that Himiko was an asymptomatic carrier of the virus who chose to entomb herself so that she could not infect others. Mathias concludes that Trinity wants to create a bio-weapon from it, but unable to move Himiko's corpse, he instead cuts off a finger, which he seals in a pouch. Lara and Richard overpower the remaining soldiers, but Mathias escapes and Richard becomes infected. Knowing there is no cure, Richard proposes destroying Himiko's tomb to prevent the disease from spreading across the world. Lara pursues Mathias as Richard sets off a bomb, killing himself and sealing the tomb. Lara fights Mathias at the ledge of a pit trap, forces him to swallow Himiko's finger, and then kicks him into the pit. She barely escapes the collapsing tomb, regrouping with Lu and the slaves; they commandeer a Trinity helicopter to escape Yamatai.

Lara returns to London, where she formally accepts her inheritance and inadvertently discovers that Trinity's front company, Patna, is a subsidiary of Croft Holdings. She investigates further, suspecting Ana is an agent of Trinity and manipulated her into accepting her inheritance to take control of Croft Holdings' business operations when Richard stopped cooperating with Trinity. Having witnessed Trinity's ruthlessness firsthand, she prepares for her next adventure. At the pawnbroker, she recovers her jade pendant, additionally buying two H&K USP pistols.

== Cast ==
- Alicia Vikander as Lara Croft, a British adventurer and archaeologist.
  - Maisy De Freitas as 7-year-old Lara
  - Emily Carey as 14-year-old Lara
- Dominic West as Lord Richard Croft, Lara's archaeologist father
- Walton Goggins as Mathias Vogel, a rival archaeologist of Richard Croft, and a member of Trinity, a shadowy organization
- Daniel Wu as Lu Ren, the ship captain who helps Lara to search for her father
- Kristin Scott Thomas as Ana Miller, an associate at Richard Croft's company, Croft Holdings
- Derek Jacobi as Mr. Yaffe, an associate at Croft Holdings
- Hannah John-Kamen as Sophie, Lara's friend
- Nick Frost as Alan, a pawn shop owner
- Jaime Winstone as Pamela, Alan's wife

Additionally, Antonio Aakeel plays Lara's friend Nitin. Duncan Airlie James plays Terry, a mixed martial arts club operator. Josef Altin portrays Lara's boss Bruce, Billy Postlethwaite and Roger Nsengiyumva appear as Bill and Rog, Lara's co-workers and opponents at the race, and Michael Obiora portrays Baxter, the Croft Holdings' receptionist.

== Production ==
=== Development and casting ===
In January 2009, Warner Bros. Pictures acquired the film rights for Tomb Raider from then-owner Eidos Interactive via a deal from Warner Bros.-owner Time Warner's increased stake in Eidos, with the intention of producing a film with Dan Lin; Paramount Pictures, who developed the prior films in the series, owned the rights before it reverted to Eidos. However, GK Films later acquired the rights from in 2011 from Square Enix, which absorbed Eidos. Metro-Goldwyn-Mayer became attatched to the project in 2013 while Warner Bros. returned in 2015, resulting in both sharing the rights, while the latter would distribute.

Initially, Megan Fox, Jennifer Lawrence, Olivia Wilde and Mila Kunis were originally rumored to portray Lara Croft, but all had declined. Deadline Hollywood had also reported that Daisy Ridley was considered for the role, but Ridley later described it as "the craziest rumor [she had] ever heard about [her]self". Norwegian director Roar Uthaug came on board in November 2015, and Alicia Vikander was cast as the new Lara Croft in April 2016. Walton Goggins was announced to play the villain in December 2016, and much of the rest of the cast was revealed in early 2017.

=== Filming ===
Principal photography began on January 23, 2017, in Cape Town, South Africa, and wrapped on June 9, 2017, at Warner Bros. Studios, Leavesden in Hertfordshire, England. Wilton House near Salisbury in Wiltshire was the location for exterior shots for Croft Manor. The waterfall sequence involving the plane was filmed at a waterpark at Lee Valley, outside London, at a venue that had been built for the 2012 Summer Olympics, and was combined with footage filmed in South Africa.

=== Visual effects ===
The visual effects are provided by Scanline VFX and supervised by Nick Crew and Paul Linden with the help of Method Studios, Rising Sun Pictures, Mr. X, Soho VFX, Zero VFX, and Factory VFX.

=== Music ===
On June 14, 2017, It was announced that Tom Holkenborg signed on as the film's composer after being removed from Justice League. The soundtrack was released digitally on March 9, 2018, by Sony Classical Records, with the physical edition being released on March 16, 2018, followed by the vinyl on August 24, 2018.

== Release ==
=== Theatrical ===
Tomb Raider premiered on March 2, 2018, in Berlin, Germany, at an exclusive preview with guests and cosplaying fans. It was released in the United States on March 16, 2018, by Warner Bros. Pictures.

=== Marketing ===
To promote the release of the film, Mattel released a promotional Barbie doll based on Lara Croft to tie in with the release. The doll is sculpted in the likeness of Alicia Vikander and features full articulation and a doll stand. The doll was designed by veteran doll designer Bill Greening as a Black Label Collector doll and released on February 19, 2018. Square Enix also promoted the film for its Final Fantasy mobile game, Final Fantasy Brave Exvius, with Lara Croft being its playable character.

=== Home media ===
Tomb Raider was released on digital streaming platforms on May 29, 2018. A 4K UHD Blu-ray, Blu-ray, and DVD release occurred on June 12, 2018. It was released in Australia on June 18, 2018, for Blu-ray, Ultra HD Blu-ray, Blu-ray 3D, and DVD.

== Reception ==
=== Box office ===
Tomb Raider grossed $58.3 million in the United States and Canada, and $216.4 million in other territories, for a worldwide total of $274.7 million, against a production budget in the range of $90–106 million. To break even, estimations say the film needed to gross at least $275 million worldwide. According to MGM's 2020 Q2 earning reports, Tomb Raider is producing net revenue for the studio.

In the United States and Canada, Tomb Raider was released alongside Love, Simon and I Can Only Imagine, and was projected to gross $23–29 million from 3,854 theaters in its opening weekend. The film made $9.1 million on its first day (including $2.1 million from Thursday night previews). It went on to open to $23.6 million, finishing second at the box office, behind Black Panther ($26.7 million in its fifth week). It fell 57% to $10.1 million in its second weekend, finishing 5th at the box office. It grossed $4.9 million in its third weekend, falling 51% and finishing seventh. Opening weekend audiences were 56 percent male and 44 percent female.

Internationally, the film opened in nine Asian countries a week before its United States debut. It made $14.2 million over the weekend, with Korea's $2.9 million being the biggest market. The film opened in China on March 16, 2018, and made $12.3 million the first day. It was the fifth-highest-grossing day for a Warner Bros. film, opening 6% higher than Wonder Woman, and went on to debut to $41 million. As of April 28, 2018, the film's largest markets were China ($78.4 million), the United Kingdom ($10.4 million), France ($10.1 million), and the CIS countries ($7.5 million).

=== Critical response ===
On Rotten Tomatoes, the film has an approval rating of 52% based on 326 reviews and an average rating of 5.5/10. The website's critical consensus reads, "Tomb Raider reboots the franchise with a more grounded approach and a star who's more than up to the task—neither of which are well served by an uninspired origin story." At the time of its release, it was the best-reviewed movie based on a video game on the site. On Metacritic, the film has a weighted average score of 48 out of 100, based on 53 critics, indicating "mixed or average reviews". Audiences polled by CinemaScore gave the film an average grade of "B" on an A+ to F scale, the same score earned by the 2001 film; PostTrak reported filmgoers gave it a 70% positive score.

Michael Phillips of the Chicago Tribune gave the film two out of four stars and said, "The Lara Croft reboot Tomb Raider isn't half bad for an hour. Then there's another hour. That hour is quite bad. It's no fun watching your action heroine get shoved, punched, and kicked to the sidelines of her movie, while the menfolk take over and take turns overacting before expiring." Todd McCarthy of The Hollywood Reporter gave the film a mixed review, criticizing the story but praising Vikander, and writing, "When all the one-dimensional supporting characters and familiar action moves fall by the wayside, the one thing left standing is Vikander... The film strains credulity even for a vid-game fantasy by letting the leading lady recover quickly from bad injuries, but other than that, Vikander commands attention and is the element here that makes Tomb Raider sort of watchable." Peter Bradshaw of The Guardian gave it two out of five and wrote: "Throughout, Vikander maintains a kind of serene evenness of manner. Blandness is Lara's theme."

Owen Gleiberman of Variety praised the film, saying that "The exciting surprise of the new Tomb Raider, directed by the Norwegian genre specialist Roar Uthaug, is that it doesn't tamp down Vikander's inner flame, or the three-dimensionality of her talent; it doesn't fold and insert her into an overly gymnastic and CGI-happy thrill ride. The movie is full of vine-swinging, bow-and-arrow-shooting, ancient-spirit-meeting action, but most of it is staged on a convincing human scale, one that's been expertly tailored to its star's understated directness." Matt Zoller Seitz of RogerEbert.com gave the film three out of four stars and said, "this is a beautifully crafted and unpretentious piece of action cinema, with several sequences that are as gorgeous as they are thrilling, and a female hero who's as elegant as she is deadly: an ass-kicking Audrey Hepburn." IndieWire's Anne Thompson wrote that Tomb Raider "was a well-mounted, intelligently wrought adventure, more grounded in the real world than its fantasy predecessors" and that "it establishes the action bonafides of both Vikander and director Roar Uthaug."

=== Accolades ===
At the 2018 Teen Choice Awards, the film received nominations for "Choice Action Movie" and Alicia Vikander as "Choice Action Movie Actress", but lost both to Avengers: Infinity War and Scarlett Johansson as Black Widow in Avengers: Infinity War, respectively.

== Franchise ==
=== Canceled sequel ===
In 2015, Adrian Askarieh, producer of the Hitman films, stated that he hoped to oversee a shared universe of Square Enix films with Just Cause, Hitman, Tomb Raider, Deus Ex, and Thief, but admitted that he did not have the rights to Tomb Raider.

Before the release of the first film, Vikander expressed interest in returning as Lara Croft for a second film, stating that "If there's an audience out there for it, then I would love to". In April 2019, Amy Jump was hired to write a script for a possible sequel, with Vikander attached. In September 2019, Ben Wheatley, Jump's husband, signed on to direct the sequel, with a planned March 19, 2021 release date, with Warner Bros. Pictures dropping out of the project. It was announced that filming would start in early 2020 in England.

According to Geek Vibes Nation, principal photography was scheduled to start in April with filming taking place across several countries including England, South Africa, Finland, and China, and looking to deliver a faithful adaptation of the games' story. Due to the COVID-19 pandemic, production was delayed, with filming due to take place in England and South Africa; and the film was removed from the studio's release schedule.

In January 2021, Misha Green signed to replace Jump and Wheatley respectively as writer and director, with the latter moving on to direct Meg 2: The Trench for Warner Bros. Pictures instead. The film was going to be released theatrically in the U.S. via Metro-Goldwyn-Mayer's distribution and marketing joint venture United Artists Releasing, and internationally through Warner Bros. Pictures.

In May 2021, Green confirmed via her official Twitter account that the first draft of the script, with the working title Tomb Raider: Obsidian, had been completed. In July of the same year, Vikander told Collider that the sequel was still set to be made, but had not yet been greenlit. In September that year, Green responded to a fan question about the status of the film on her Twitter account, indicating that she was still set to direct her own script.

In July 2022, it was reported that MGM had lost the film rights to the Tomb Raider franchise, after the window in which to give the sequel the green light ran out, culminating in Vikander's departure from the lead role. During this time, the rights reverted to its original game companies (Eidos and Crystal Dynamics), which were later acquired by Embracer Group in the third quarter of 2022, prompting a bidding war among other film studios.

=== Reboot ===
In January 2023, MGM sister company Amazon Studios (now known as Amazon MGM Studios) secured the rights to a new Tomb Raider film, with Dmitri M. Johnson and his company dj2 Entertainment attached to produce. The film is intended to be interconnected with a television series being developed by Phoebe Waller-Bridge and a video game from Crystal Dynamics, forming a Tomb Raider shared universe.

== See also ==
- List of films based on video games
