= Troll 2 (2025 film) =

Norwegian film by Roar Uthaug

- Release poster
- Directed by: Roar Uthaug
- Screenplay by: Espen Aukan
- Produced by: Espen Horn; Kristian Strand Sinkerud
- Starring: Ine Marie Wilmann; Kim S. Falck-Jørgensen; Mads Sjøgård Pettersen; Sara Khorami; Jon Ketil Johnsen; Gard B. Eidsvold; Aksel Almaas; Trond Magnum
- Production company: Motion Blur
- Distributed by: Netflix
- Release date: December 1, 2025
- Running time: 105 minutes
- Country: Norway
- Language: Norwegian

Troll 2 is a 2025 Norwegian monster film directed by Roar Uthaug and written by Espen Aukan. It is the sequel to Troll and stars Kim S. Falck-Jørgensen and Mads Sjøgård Pettersen, both of whom reprise their roles for the film and are joined by Sara Khorami, Jon Ketil Johnsen, Gard B. Eidsvold, Aksel Almaas, and Trond Magnum. It tells the story of Nora Tidemann, Andreas Isaksen, and Kristoffer Holm who reunite to fend off against another giant troll, Jotun, while they befriend another giant troll who helps to fight Jotun.

Development on Troll 2 began when Netflix had ordered the crew to create a sequel to Troll. Principal photography began in 2024, with Uthaug and Aukan returning as director and writer, respectively. A teaser was revealed in January 2025. Filmed in Trondheim, Maridalen, Jotunheimen, and Budapest, Troll 2 is the largest film production ever in the Nordic countries.

Troll 2 was released on Netflix on December 1, 2025. The film received mixed reviews from critics.

== Plot ==
Tobias Tidemann tells his daughter Nora the story of how humans and trolls once lived in harmony, until the Christian King Olaf wiped most of Norway's trolls out by forcing them into sunlight before imprisoning the Troll King and his offspring underground.

Thirty years later, Nora now lives alone in a remote cabin, three years after her encounter with the Troll King, (Note: As depicted in Troll) having resigned from her previous job of studying trolls for the Norwegian government. She is visited by Andreas Isaksen, who asks for her help in dealing with a new discovery. They travel to Vemork and enter a top-secret underground research facility run by Marion Rhadani, which houses a hibernating troll codenamed "Jotun", as well as ancient documents written by Olaf. While reuniting with Professor Møller and Professor Wangel, Nora approaches the sleeping Jotun while singing a song taught to her by Tobias. Jotun is awakened and breaks free, killing Wangel and escaping from the facility, as Møller escapes with a sample from Jotun.

Nora, Andreas and Marion meet up with Major Kristoffer Holm and Norway's Prime Minister Brichmann, who orders that the troll be killed despite Nora’s objections. The trio convince Kris to take them along on his operation, using two helicopters equipped with powerful ultraviolet lights. Jotun attacks a ski resort, killing numerous civilians, before Kris's forces arrive. The UV lights prove effective, but Jotun manages to destroy one of the helicopters, killing Kris's friend Amir, before departing.

At Nora's recommendation, the team return to the Dovre Municipality mountain cave where the Troll King emerged and find the underground pit that was once used to trap him. Nora lures another troll out of hiding: the now-adult offspring of the Troll King. She pacifies the young troll using the same song that awakened Jotun and nicknames him "Beautiful". She suggests that they attempt to have Beautiful communicate with Jotun, hoping to prevent any further conflict.

Nora and the team manage to bring Jotun and Beautiful together, and the two trolls communicate, but Jotun attacks Beautiful and causes him to fall into a deep fjord, forcing the team to flee. As the team regroup, a regretful Nora reveals that she had already found Beautiful and communicated with him once before. Marion deduces that the vengeful Jotun is following an ancient pilgrimage route which will lead him to Trondheim, Olaf's former capital.

In Trondheim, the team discover Olaf's hidden tomb in Nidaros Cathedral. Inside, they find a missing piece of an ancient document, which reveals that Olaf had a change of heart and decided to give the trolls a sanctuary where they could live in peace, but was killed on the Church's orders so they could continue to wipe out the creatures. Nora also realizes that holy water can be used against the trolls, and the team recruit some of Trondheim's citizens to help prepare a trap for Jotun.

Jotun enters Trondheim and approaches the cathedral, sustaining some damage from the team's new holy-water weapons but ultimately breaking through their defenses. However, Beautiful also arrives and challenges Jotun, igniting a battle between the two trolls until Jotun gains the upper hand. Nora and Marion distract Jotun with holy-water rockets, while Andreas sacrifices himself by diving into Jotun's mouth with their last holy-water bomb, which detonates inside Jotun and badly wounds him. Beautiful then kills Jotun by punching through his torso and ripping out his heart.

Later, Nora, Kris and Marion now live with Andreas's wife Sigrid and infant daughter Uhura, in a new sanctuary that has been established for Beautiful. In a mid-credits scene, Møller is secretly studying a baby troll that has been grown from one of Jotun's genetic samples.

== Cast ==
- Ine Marie Wilmann as Nora Tidemann, a paleontologist who became a recluse and found Beautiful
  - India Johanna Mydske as Young Nora Tidemann
- Kim S. Falck-Jørgensen as Andreas Isaksen, the former Prime Minister's office worker who wrote a book that made mild sales
- Mads Sjøgård Pettersen as Major Kristoffer "Kris" Holm, a military member and old friend of Nora and Andreas who has been promoted to major since the events of the first film.
- Sara Khorami as Marion Auryn Rhadani, the head of the Vemork facility
- Karoline Viktoria Sletteng Garvang as Sigrid Hodne, a staff sergeant who married Andreas
- Anne Krigsvoll as Esther Johanne Tiller, a historian in Trondheim who helps Nora's group get into King Olaf's tombs
- Jon Ketil Johnsen as Professor Møller, a professor who was among those that helped the government in the last film
- Duc Paul Mai-The as Professor Wangel, a professor who was among those that helped the government in the last film
- Yusuf Toosh Ibra as Amir Aw-Geedi, a military colleague of Kris who helps in an attempt to stop Jotun
- Gard B. Eidsvold as Tobias Tidemann, the late father of Nora who appears in a flashback at the beginning of the film
- Thea Borring Lande as Mathilde Tidemann, the late mother of Nora who died while she was young
- Ola G. Furuseth as Martin Brinchmann, the Prime Minister of Norway and successor of Berit Moberg whose brother was revealed to have perished in the helicopter-carried bell tactic in the last film
- Dennis Storhøi as General Sverre Lunde, the Chief of Defence
- Aksel Almaas as Party Boy
- Ingrid Vollun as the voice of Oddrun Gundersen, she is heard on the phone talking with her husband
- Trond Magnum as Lars Gundersen, a man whose house was being rebuilt while Oddrun was away until it was destroyed by Jotun

=== English dub ===
- Emily Goss as Professor Nora Tidemann
- Kieran Regan as Andreas Isaksen
- Austen Moret as Captain Kristoffer Holm
- Kyla Garcia as Marion Auryn Rhadani
- Rae Eaton as Sigrid Hodne
- Karrie King as Esther Johann Tiller
- Jesse Corti as Professor Møller
- Alan Lee as Professor Wangel
- Michael Edwards as Amir Aw-Geedi
- Richard Cansino as Tobias Tidemann
- Natalie Avital as Mathilde Tidemann
- Chris Smith as Martin Brinchmann
- David St. James as Sverre Lunde
- Carrie Madsen as Oddrunn Gundersen
- Michael Bell as Lars Gunderson

== Production ==
Troll 2 was directed by Roar Uthaug, with Espen Aukan as the screenwriter, and Espen Horn and Kristian Strand Sinkerud from Motion Blur as the film producers. The film was filmed in Trondheim, Pilgrimsleden, Maridalen in Oslo, Jotunheimen, Rjukan, Hemsedal and Budapest. Two locations are particularly noteworthy: the Nidaros Cathedral in Trondheim and Vemork in Rjukan. Troll 2 is the largest film production ever in the Nordic countries.

== Release ==
Troll 2 was released on Netflix on December 1, 2025.

== Reception ==
On the review aggregator website Rotten Tomatoes, 61% of 18 critics' reviews are positive, with an average rating of 5.8/10.

Simon Abrams of RogerEbert.com gave the film two out of four stars and wrote, "Unlike its predecessor, Troll 2 doesn't have enough canned dramatic or comedic incidents to make it seem particularly eventful."
