= Toll Gate, West Virginia =

- Unincorporated community
- Location within West Virginia Location within the United States
- Coordinates: 39°16′21″N 80°54′54″W
- Country: United States
- State: West Virginia
- County: Ritchie
- Elevation: 804 ft (245 m)
- Time zone: UTC-5 (Eastern (EST))
  - Summer (DST): UTC-4 (EDT)
- ZIP codes: 26442
- Area codes: 304 & 681
- GNIS feature ID: 1555815

Toll Gate is an unincorporated community in Ritchie County, West Virginia, United States. Toll Gate is 3 miles (4.8 km) east-southeast of Pennsboro.

The community was named after a tollgate near the original town site.
