= Toll (name) =

Toll is a surname. Notable people with the name include:

- Bruce E. Toll (born 1943), co-founder of Toll Brothers
- Catherine Toll (born 1959), American educator and politician from Vermont
- Eduard von Toll (1858–1902), Baltic German geologist and Arctic explorer
- Herman Toll (1907–1967), American politician from Pennsylvania
- Johan Christopher Toll (1743–1817), Swedish statesman and soldier
- John Toll (born 1952), American cinematographer
- John S. Toll (1923–2011), American physicist and educational administrator
- Karl Toll (1862–1936), Swedish officer
- Karl Wilhelm von Toll (1777–1842), Baltic German aristocrat and general
- Robert I. Toll (1940–2022), co-founder of Toll Brothers
- Sergiusz Toll (1893–1961), Polish entomologist
- Steve Toll (born 1974), Canadian lacrosse executive and former player
- Winfried Toll (born 1955), German conductor, singer, composer and academic teacher
