= Allan Hyde =

Danish actor (born 1989)

- Born: 20 December 1989 (age 36); Copenhagen, Denmark
- Occupations: Actor, singer, producer, scriptwriter
- Years active: 2002–present
- Spouse: Marie Hvidt Hyde

Allan Hyde (born 20 December 1989) is a Danish actor. He is best known for his role as the 2000-year-old vampire Godric in HBO's True Blood. He has performed in several Danish films and television series.

== Early life ==
Hyde was born in Denmark to a Danish mother and an English father from London. He grew up in Valby, and the street he grew up on was Traps Alle. Right across nr 7 He started acting in the Danish theater school Eventyrteatret, and in 2002 appeared in the musical Les Misérables.

== Career ==
Hyde began his acting career in Danish television in 2008 with roles in Album and 2900 Happiness. In the same year he appeared in the short films En Forelskelse (The Awakening) and Implosion. In 2009, he was cast as Godric in the HBO series True Blood. His character appears in four episodes in the second season. The character proved popular with viewers and with creator Alan Ball, and returned for the following two seasons, and appeared in flashbacks and as visions in Season 5. Hyde lived in Los Angeles while appearing in True Blood, until October 2012.

Since returning to Denmark, he has appeared in roles including a Danish prince in the 2017 Norwegian film Askeladden i Dovregubbens hall (The Ash Lad: In the Hall of the Mountain King). He plays a leading role in Fars drenge, a comedy series that premiered in August 2021. He provided the voice dubbing for Ron Weasley in all the Danish releases of the Harry Potter films and is the voice of several cartoon characters on Danish television.

Hyde is also a singer. He sang on one track of the Danish version of the soundtrack Camp Rock, and sings in the films Far til fire - Onkel Sofus vender tilbage and Far til fires vilde ferie.

Hyde also works as a scriptwriter. With Anders Morgenthaler, he co-scripted the comedy series Try Hard, which premiered in spring 2021.

== GourmetFilm ==
Hyde started a production company in 2008 called GourmetFilm with his friend Aske Bang. Their web sitcom Alla Salute! premiered in April 2011; other work includes the short film Fly on the Wings of Love.

== Personal life ==
Hyde became engaged to Marie Hvidt in 2017.

== Select filmography ==
=== Television ===
- 2900 Happiness (2008) – Max
- Album (2008) – Martin
- True Blood (2009–12) – Godric
- Lærkevej (4 episodes, 2010) – Jonas
- Den som dræber (2011) – Andreas
- Kødkataloget (2013-) – Jonas
- Limbo (2013) – Vikar
- Heartless (2013-) – Pieter
- Dicte II (2 episodes, 2014) – Simon Østergaard
- Juleønsket (2015) – Michael
- Silas (2015) – Anton
- Below the Surface (2017) – Silas Jensen
- Cold Hawaii (2020) – Mads-Emil
- Fars Drenge (2021) – Pelle

=== Films ===
- Implosion (2008) – Thomas
- En Forelskelse (2008) – Carsten
- Sidste Kys (2009) – Søren Grinderslev Hansen
- Franky, Frankly (2010) – Madison
- Exteriors (2010) – Allan
- You & Me Forever (2012) – Tobias
- Miraklet (The Miracle) (2012) – Young Jakob
- Marionette (2012) – Policeman
- Mommy (2013) – Lucas
- Far Til Fire - Onkel Sofus Vender Tilbage (2014) – Peter
- Kolbøttefabrikken (2014) – Frank
- Danny's Dommedag (2014) ... Fisker
- Mig Og Kærligheden (2014) – Kevin
- Hundeliv (2015) – William
- Dryads (2015) – Thomas
- The Shamer's Daughter (2015) – Davin
- Far Til Fire - Vilde Ferie (2015) – Peter
- Sommeren '92 (2015) – Flemming Povlsen
- TYRON (2015)
- Askeladden i Dovregubbens hall (2017) – Prince Frederik
- Skammerens datter II: Slangens gave (2019) – Davin

=== GourmetFilm ===
- Dværgen og Luderen (2008)
- The Friendly (2010)
- ALLA SALUTE (2010) – Patrik
- Stupid Clown (2011)
- Trail Of Broken Hearts (2012) – Kevin
- Fly on the Wings of Love (2013)

=== Theatre ===
- Les Misérables (2002) – Gavroche
- Sound Of Music (2004) – Friedrich
- Ugly Duckling (2005) – Ugly Duckling
- Peters Christmas (2005–2006) – Rasmus
- Uncle Danny (2006) – Dan
- Grease (2014) – Kenickie

=== Dubbing into Danish ===
- Camp Rock (2008)
- All Harry Potter films – Ron Weasley
- Ginga Densetsu Weed (2008) – Weed
- Det Ukendtes Skov – Wirt
- Teen Beach Movie – Tanner

=== Scriptwriter ===
- B (2014)
- Jeanne d'Arc (2015)
- Try Hard (2021)
