= Trolltooth =

Trolltooth may refer to:

- Trolltooth Pass
- The Trolltooth Wars
