= Roar Uthaug =

Norwegian film director (born 1973)

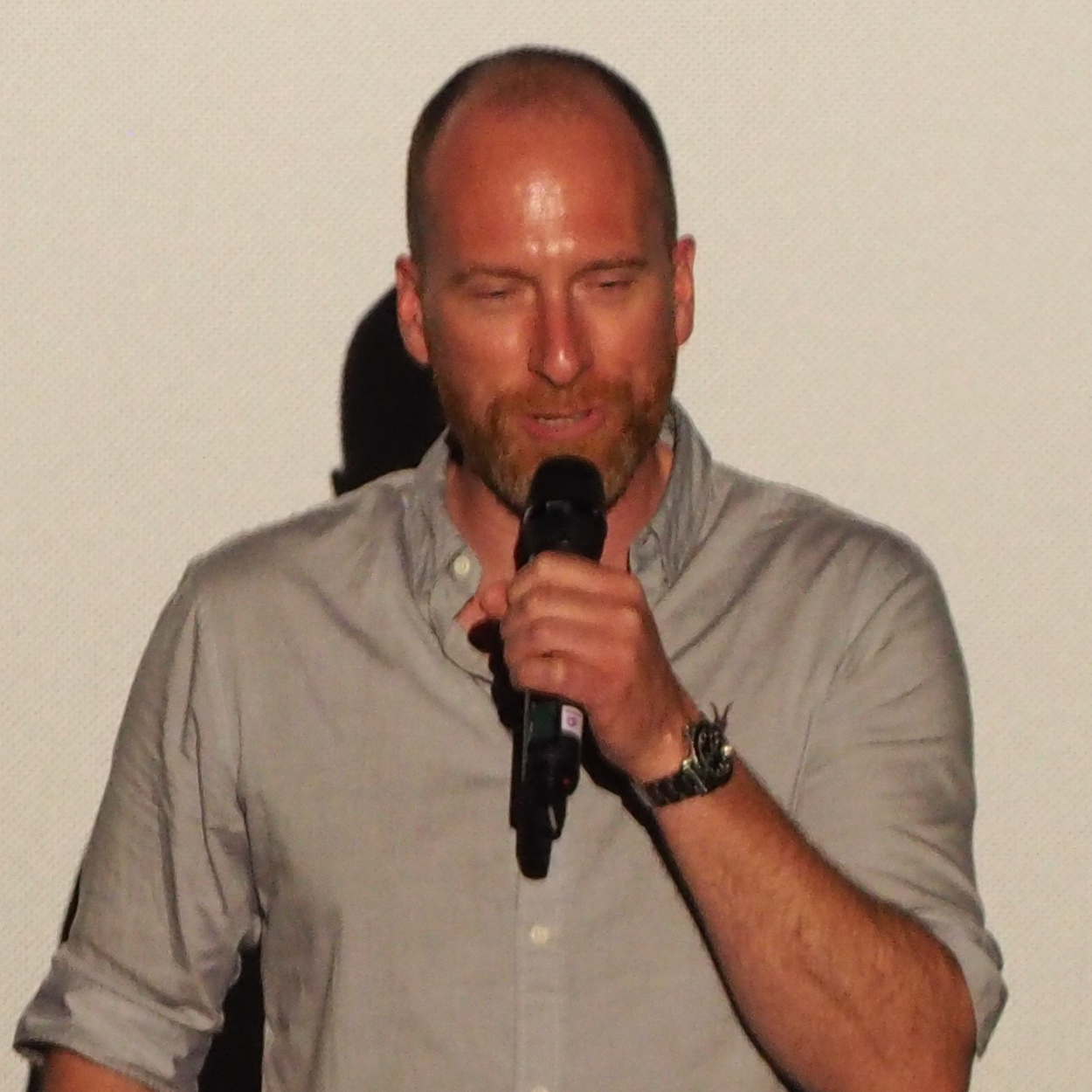
- Uthaug at the 2015 Toronto International Film Festival
- Born: August 25, 1973 (age 52); Lørenskog, Norway
- Years active: 1993–present

Roar Uthaug (born August 25, 1973) is a Norwegian film director. He graduated from the Norwegian Film School in 2002.

== Career ==
Uthaug's graduation film The Martin Administration was the second Norwegian student-film in history to be nominated by AMPAS (the Academy of Motion Pictures, Arts and Science) for the Student Academy Awards.

Working at the Norwegian production company Fantefilm, Uthaug has directed numerous commercials for Norwegian TV, and music videos for Gåte, Furia, Unni Wilhelmsen and Vidar Busk.

His feature debut Fritt Vilt (Cold Prey) was released in Norway on October 13, 2006. His notable feature was the 2015 disaster film, The Wave. In 2018, Uthaug directed Tomb Raider, the reboot of the film franchise, which was released on March 16, 2018 starring Alicia Vikander as Lara Croft. In 2022, he directed the film, Troll. It was released on Netflix on December 1, 2022. In 2025, he directed the film, Troll 2 (2025 film), which was a direct sequel to the movie, Troll. It was released on Netflix on December 1, 2025.

== Filmography ==
Short film

Year	Title	Director	Writer	Notes
1993	Snørr	Yes	Yes	
1994	En aften i det gronne	Yes	No	
1996	DX13036	Yes	No	
1996	Dis 2	Yes	Yes	Also producer
1996	A Fistful of Kebab	Yes	No	Co-directed with Espen Egeland
2002	Regjeringen Martin	Yes	No	

Feature film

Year	Title	Director	Writer	Executive Producer	Notes
2006	Cold Prey	Yes	No	No	
2009	Magic Silver	Yes	No	No	Co-directed with Katarina Launing
2012	Escape	Yes	Story	No	
2015	The Wave	Yes	No	No	
2018	Tomb Raider	Yes	No	No	
2022	Troll	Yes	Story	Yes	
2025	Troll 2	Yes	Story	Yes	

Television

Year	Title	Notes
2012	Hellfjord	1 episode
2016	Mammon	Episode "Miklagard"
