= Tol =

Tol or TOL may refer to:

== People ==
- Tol (surname), a Dutch surname
- Tol Avery (1915–1973), American film and television character actor
- Tol Hansse (1940–2002), stage name of Hans van Tol, Dutch singer and musician
- Vontongchai Intarawat (born 1987), Thai singer also known as Tol

== Places ==
- Tol, Iran, a village in Hormozgan Province
- Tol (Castropol), Asturias, Spain, a parish
- Tol, Federated States of Micronesia, a village
- Tol (island), in Chuuk State in the Federated States of Micronesia

== Transport codes ==
- TOL, IATA airport code and FAA location identifier for Toledo Express Airport, Toledo, Ohio, United States
- TOL, National Rail station code for Tolworth railway station, London

== Acronyms ==
- Treaty of Lisbon, a treaty amending the treaties of the European Union
- Tales of Legendia, a 2005 PlayStation 2 role-playing game
- Tower of London
- Township of Langley, British Columbia, Canada
- Transitions Online, an online journal
- Tree of life
- Tricare Online
- Throne of Lies, the online game of lies and deceit
- Trucial Oman Levies, paramilitary force that the British raised in 1951 to serve in the Trucial States

== Other uses ==
- Tol language, an indigenous and near-extinct language of Honduras
- Doljanchi, per the McCune–Reischauer romanization of Korean

== See also ==
- Tola (disambiguation)
- Toll (disambiguation)
