= Jim Tolle =

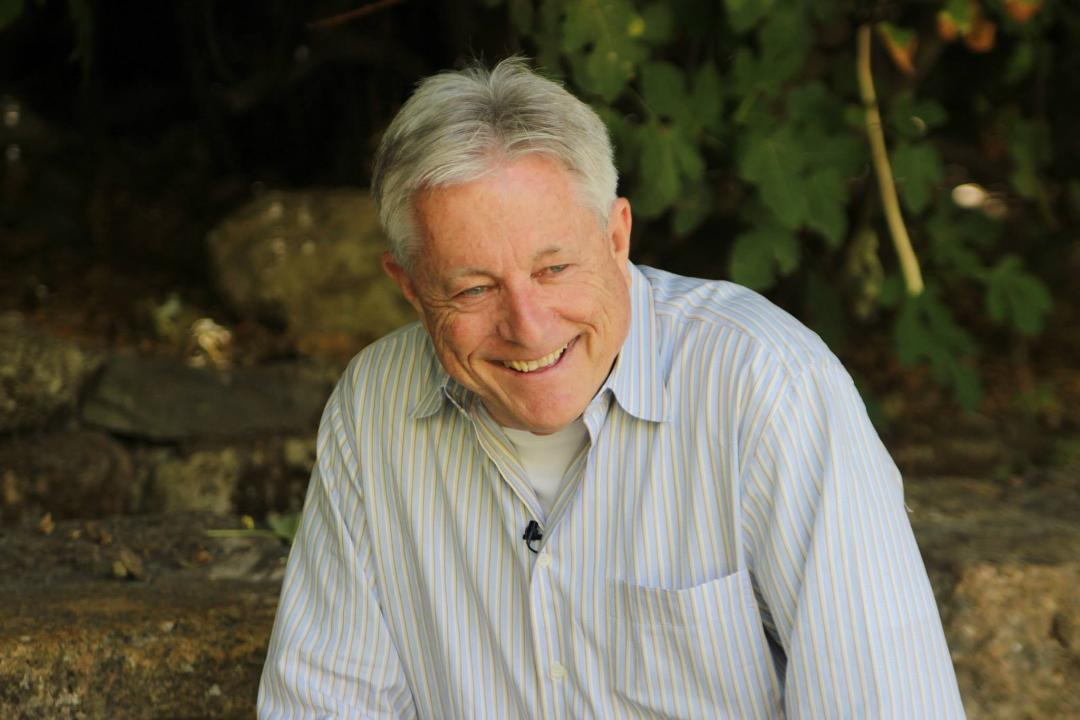
- Born: James Allen Tolle; April 13, 1949 (age 76); Los Angeles, California
- Occupations: Pastor, speaker, Evangelist, community leader
- Spouse: Alice Tolle

Jim Tolle is an American pastor, small college president, and radio host based in Los Angeles. After graduating with a degree in theology, he began as an apprentice minister with the well-known pastor, Dr. Jack W. Hayford and eventually served as Senior Pastor at The Church On The Way, a very well known congregation in the city, which became one of the largest multicultural churches in the United States. Since his retirement, he has pursued starting other multi-ethnic congregations. Today, he pastors El Camino Metro Church, (see: El Camino Metro), which offers services in both Spanish and English. Having begun the church in 2018, it has grown rapidly in rented facilities and has become an incubator for new leaders who have begun more than 50 other congregations.

Throughout his ministry, he has held numerous positions including that of being a church planter in Colombia and Argentina and the International Director of a global missions organization involving over 70,000 churches in 120 countries.

Jim is also well known as a radio host with his daily Spanish language program "Respuestas" which airs twice daily, reaching millions across the U.S. on the Radio Inspiración Network. He is often called upon to share his insights with television, radio, and print media, including CBN, CNN, Fox Español, Univisión and Salem Broadcasting Network. His influence has also extended to Washington, D.C., where he has testified before Congress and has been a participant in the National Hispanic Prayer Breakfast in Washington, D.C. Pastor Jim also serves on the board of directors of numerous organizations, including the National Association of Evangelicals (NAE), and the National Hispanic Christian Leadership Council (NHCLC).

Jim is passionate about helping people improve their lives through personal development and education. He serves on the boards of several schools and has championed the cause of education both in the private and public school systems. Pastor Jim is the president of El Camino Christian College, a school which he and his friend, Dr. Paul Chappell founded in 2014, which helps low-income students obtain college degrees. (see: El Camino Christian College) In his early adult years, Jim Tolle served in Vietnam in the U.S. Army. Later, he became an entrepreneur, starting a number of successful small businesses. He holds numerous degrees, both earned and honorary. He and his wife, Alice, live in Los Angeles near their close-knit family.
