= Troll =

Supernatural being in Nordic folklore

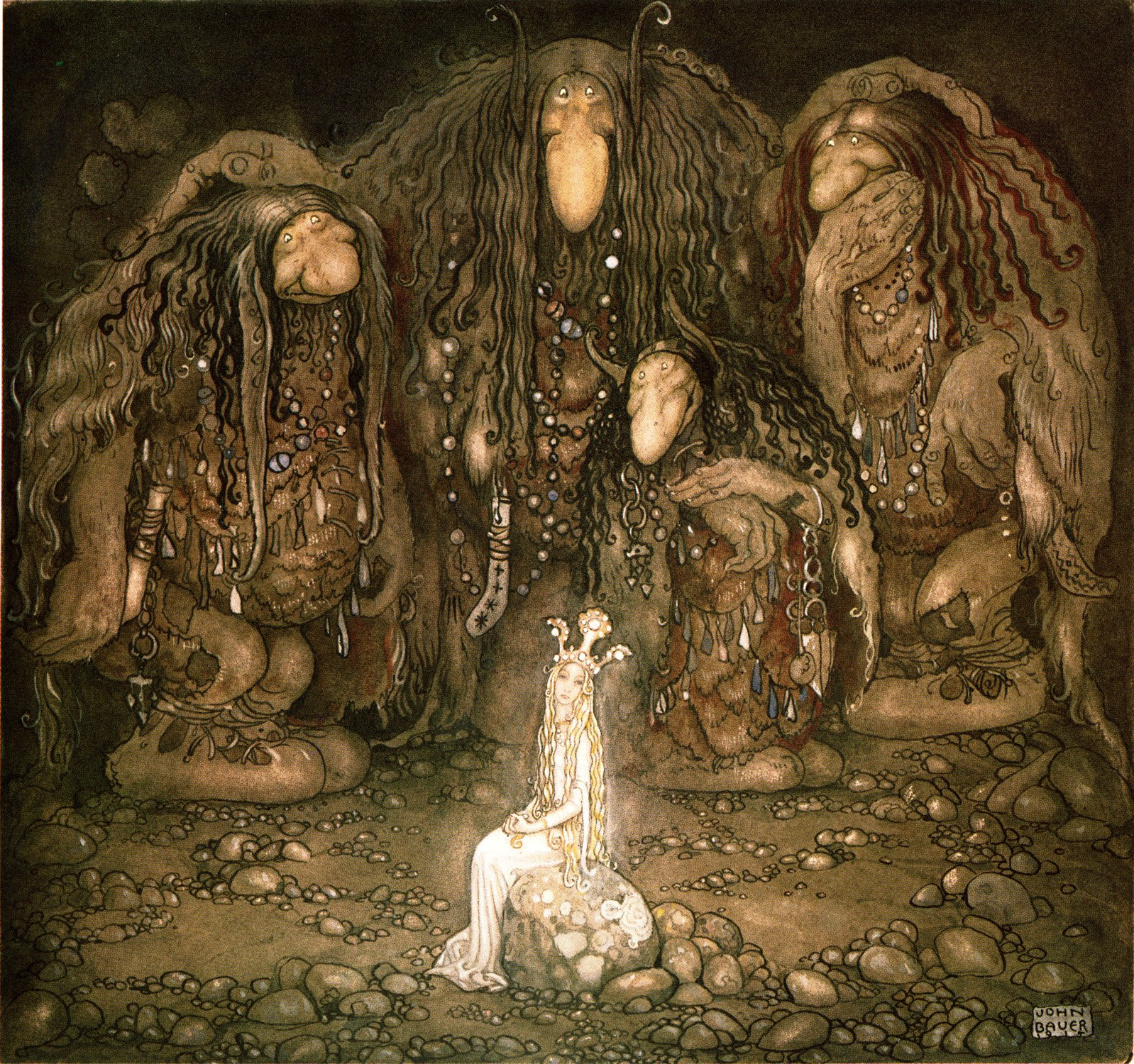
Look at them, troll mother said. Look at my sons! You won't find more beautiful trolls on this side of the moon. (1915) by John Bauer

A troll is a being in Nordic folklore, including Norse mythology. In Old Norse sources, beings described as trolls dwell in isolated areas of rocks, mountains, or caves, live together in small family units, and are rarely helpful to human beings.

In later Scandinavian folklore, trolls became beings in their own right, where they live far from human habitation, are not Christianized, and are considered dangerous to human beings. Depending on the source, their appearance varies greatly; trolls may be ugly and slow-witted, or look and behave exactly like human beings, with no particularly grotesque characteristic about them.

In Scandinavian folklore, trolls are sometimes associated with particular landmarks (sometimes said to have been formed by a troll having been exposed to sunlight). Trolls are depicted in a variety of media in modern popular culture.

== Etymology ==
The Old Norse nouns troll and trǫll (variously meaning "fiend, demon, werewolf, jötunn") and Middle High German troll, trolle "fiend" (according to philologist Vladimir Orel, the word is likely borrowed from Old Norse), possibly developed from Proto-Germanic neuter noun *trullan, meaning "to tread, step on". The origin of the Proto-Germanic word is unknown. Additionally, the Old Norse verb trylla 'to enchant, to turn into a troll' and the Middle High German verb trüllen "to flutter" both developed from the Proto-Germanic verb *trulljanan, a derivative of *trullan.

== Norse mythology ==
In Norse mythology, troll, like thurs, is a term applied to jötnar and is mentioned throughout the Old Norse corpus. In Old Norse sources, trolls are said to dwell in isolated mountains, rocks, and caves, sometimes live together (usually as father-and-daughter or mother-and-son), and are rarely described as helpful or friendly. The Prose Edda book Skáldskaparmál describes an encounter between an unnamed troll woman and the 9th-century skald Bragi Boddason. According to the section, Bragi was driving through "a certain forest" late one evening when a troll woman aggressively asked him who he was, in the process describing herself:

Old Norse:

Troll kalla mik
trungl sjǫtrungnis,
auðsug jǫtuns,
élsólar bǫl,
vilsinn vǫlu,
vǫrð nafjarðar,
hvélsveg himins –
hvat's troll nema þat?

Anthony Faulkes translation:

Trolls call me
moon of dwelling-Rungnir,
giant's wealth-sucker,
storm-sun's bale,
seeress's friendly companion,
guardian of corpse-fiord,
swallower of heaven-wheel;
what is a troll other than that?

John Lindow translation:

They call me a troll,
moon of the earth-Hrungnir [?]
wealth sucker [?] of the giant,
destroyer of the storm-sun [?]
beloved follower of the seeress,
guardian of the "nafjord" [?]
swallower of the wheel of heaven [the sun].
What's a troll if not that?

Bragi responds in turn, describing himself and his abilities as a skillful skald, before the scenario ends.

There is much confusion and overlap in the use of Old Norse terms jötunn, troll, þurs, and risi, which describe various beings. Lotte Motz theorized that these were originally four distinct classes of beings: lords of nature (jötunn), mythical magicians (troll), hostile monsters (þurs), and heroic and courtly beings (risi), the last class being the youngest addition. On the other hand, Ármann Jakobson is critical of Motz's interpretation and calls this theory "unsupported by any convincing evidence". Ármann highlights that the term is used to denote various beings, such as a jötunn or mountain-dweller, a witch, an abnormally strong or large or ugly person, an evil spirit, a ghost, a blámaðr, a magical boar, a heathen demi-god, a demon, a brunnmigi, or a berserker.

== Scandinavian folklore ==
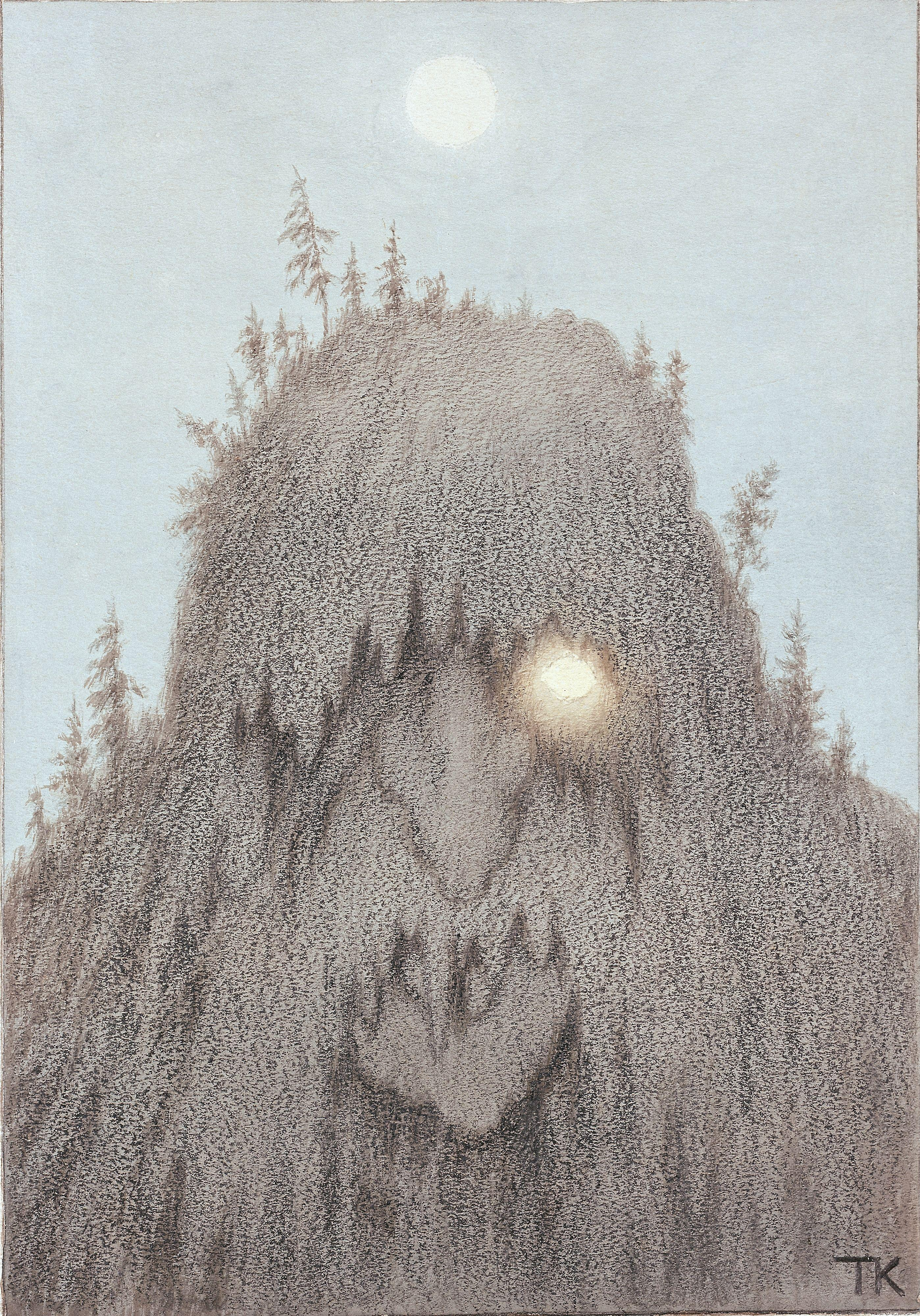
Skogtroll (Forest Troll), by Theodor Kittelsen, 1906

Later in Scandinavian folklore, trolls become defined as a particular type of being. Numerous tales are recorded about trolls in which they are frequently described as being extremely old, very strong, but slow and dim-witted, and are at times described as man-eaters and as turning to stone upon contact with sunlight. However, trolls are also attested as looking much the same as human beings, without any particularly hideous appearance about them, but living far away from human habitation and generally having "some form of social organization"—unlike the rå and näck, who are attested as "solitary beings". According to John Lindow, what sets them apart is that they are not Christian, and those who encounter them do not know them. Therefore, trolls were in the end dangerous, regardless of how well they might get along with Christian society, and trolls display a habit of bergtagning ('kidnapping'; literally "mountain-taking") and overrunning a farm or estate.

Lindow states that the etymology of the word "troll" remains uncertain, though he defines trolls in later Swedish folklore as "nature beings" and as "all-purpose otherworldly being[s], equivalent, for example, to fairies in Anglo-Celtic traditions". They "therefore appear in various migratory legends where collective nature-beings are called for". Lindow notes that trolls are sometimes swapped out for cats and "little people" in the folklore record.

A Scandinavian folk belief that lightning frightens away trolls and jötnar appears in numerous Scandinavian folktales, and may be a late reflection of the god Thor's role in fighting such beings. In connection, the lack of trolls and jötnar in modern Scandinavia is sometimes explained as a result of the "accuracy and efficiency of the lightning strokes". Additionally, the absence of trolls in regions of Scandinavia is described in folklore as being a "consequence of the constant din of the church-bells". This ringing caused the trolls to leave for other lands, although not without some resistance; numerous traditions relate how trolls destroyed a church under construction or hurled boulders and stones at completed churches. Large local stones are sometimes described as the product of a troll's toss. Additionally, into the 20th century, the origins of particular Scandinavian landmarks, such as particular stones, are ascribed to trolls who may, for example, have turned to stone upon exposure to sunlight.

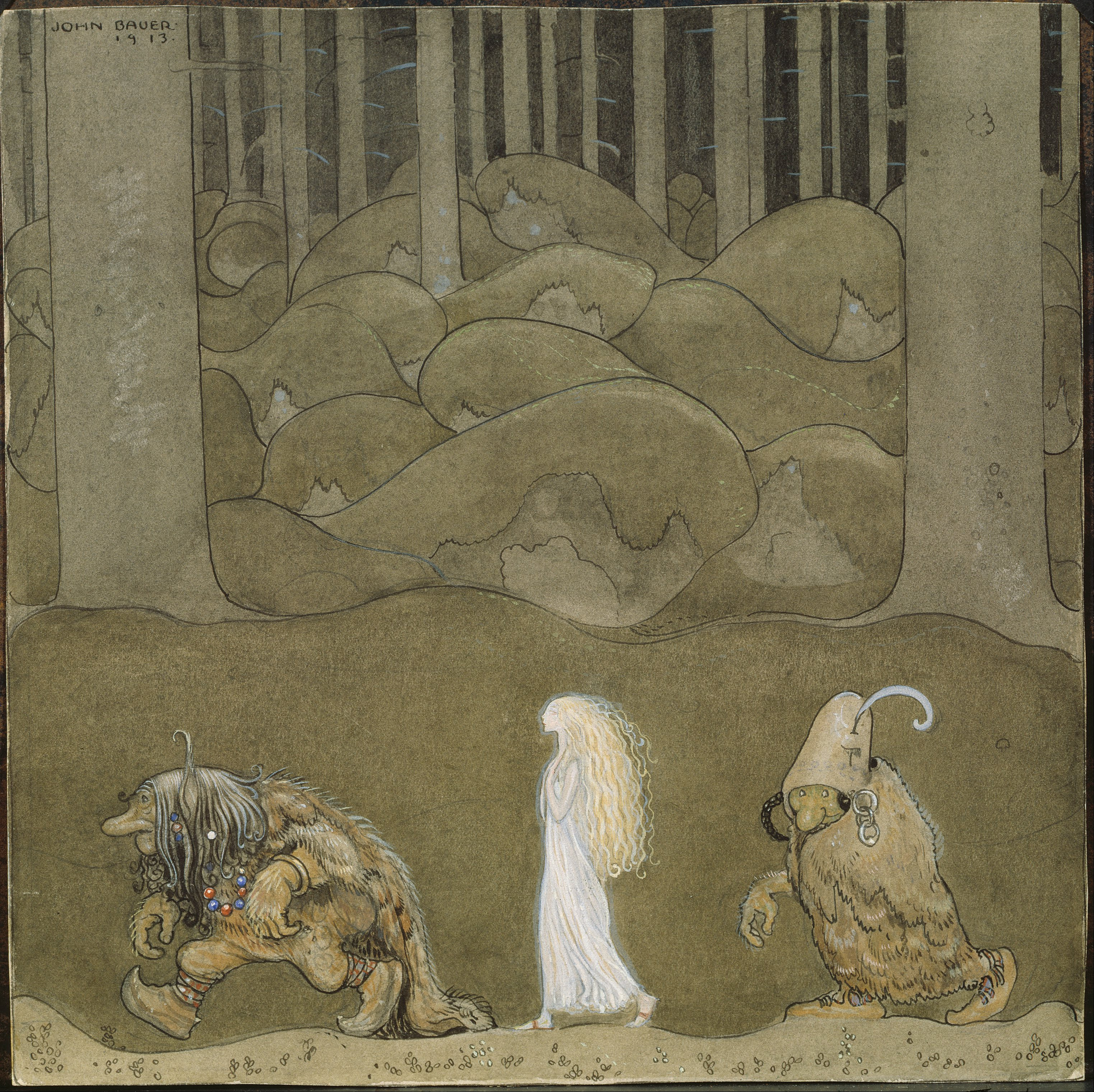
The Princess and the Trolls –The Changeling, by John Bauer, 1913

Lindow compares the trolls of the Swedish folk tradition to Grendel, the supernatural mead hall invader in the Old English poem Beowulf, and notes that "just as the poem Beowulf emphasizes not the harrying of Grendel but the cleansing of the hall of Beowulf, so the modern tales stress the moment when the trolls are driven off."

Smaller trolls are attested as living in burial mounds and in mountains in Scandinavian folk tradition. In Denmark, these creatures are recorded as troldfolk ("troll-folk"), bjergtrolde ("mountain-trolls"), or bjergfolk ("mountain-folk") and in Norway also as trollfolk ("troll-folk") and tusser. Trolls may be described as small, human-like beings or as tall as men depending on the region of origin of the story.

In Norwegian tradition, similar tales may be told about the larger trolls and the Huldrefolk ("hidden-folk"), yet a distinction is made between the two. The use of the word trow in Orkney and Shetland, to mean beings which are very like the Huldrefolk in Norway, may suggest a common origin for the terms. The word troll may have been used by pagan Norse settlers in Orkney and Shetland as a collective term for supernatural beings who should be respected and avoided rather than worshipped. Troll could later have become specialized as a description of the larger, more menacing Jötunn-kind whereas Huldrefolk may have developed as the term for smaller trolls.

John Arnott MacCulloch posited a connection between the Old Norse vættir and trolls, suggesting that both concepts may derive from spirits of the dead.

Troll, a Norwegian research station in Antarctica, is so named because of the rugged mountains which stand around that place like trolls. It includes a ground station which tracks satellites in polar orbit.

== In popular culture ==
Trolls have appeared in many works of modern fiction, most often in the fantasy genre, with classic examples being the portrayal of trolls in works such as in Tolkien's Middle-earth or the Dungeons & Dragons roleplaying game.

Beginning in the 1950s, Troll dolls were a popular toy based on the folklore creature. Trolls based on the dolls appeared in the Hollywood animated movie Trolls (2016) and its subsequent sequels Trolls World Tour (2020), and Trolls Band Together (2023).

There were also different types of trolls in the Harry Potter franchise.

Troll is the name of a 2022 Norwegian movie released by Netflix on December 1, 2022, that details with the awakening of a 105 ft. troll that sports a rocky body and a cat-like tail. A sequel called Troll 2 released on December 1, 2025. The sequel featured two trolls.

The French-Nordic folk band Skáld has performed a song based off Bragi Boddason's encounter with a troll and the Old Norse translation of Skáldskaparmál, titled Troll Kalla Mik. Their music video for it, as of May 2026, has 2.7 million views on Youtube.

Trolls were heavily featured in the 2010 Norwegian found footage movie Trollhunter, directed by André Øvredal.

Rolf Lidberg was a Swedish artist well known for his troll illustrations.

The Danish artist Thomas Dambo has created from recycled wood a series of monumental troll sculptures that can be seen in several botanic gardens and similar installations.

== Other ==
It has been hypothesized that the troll myth might have its origin in real-life interactions between anatomically modern humans and Neanderthal hominids.

== See also ==
- Þorgerðr Hölgabrúðr, a Norse goddess whose surname sometimes contains the element -troll
- Moomintroll, a fictional protagonist of The Moomins
- Hugo, a Danish video game and media franchise
