= The Church on the Way =

Church in Van Nuys, California, United States

The Church On The Way
- Van Nuys Foursquare Church
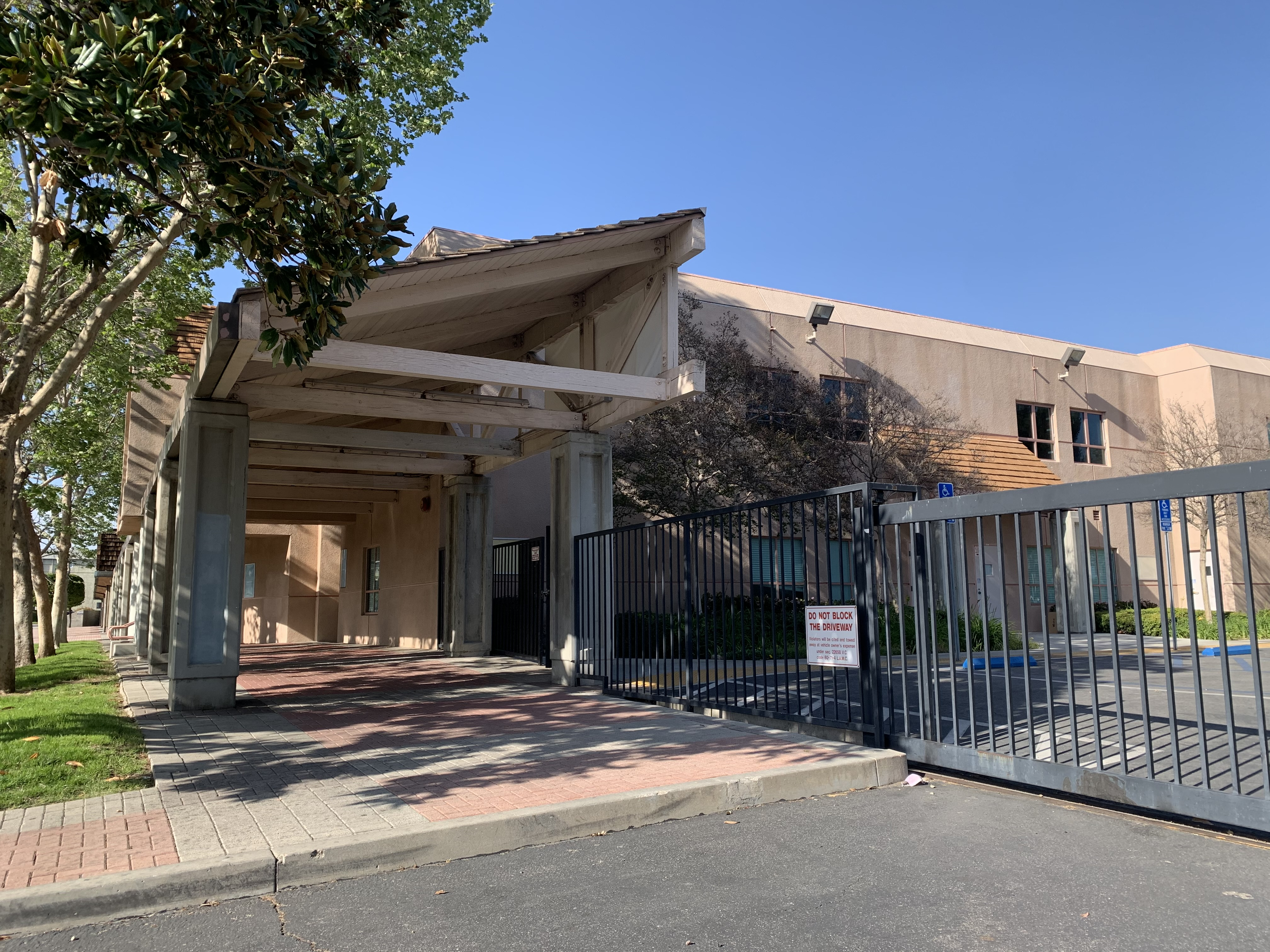

- 34.200761°N 118.4471727°W
- Location: 14300 Sherman Way, Van Nuys, CA 91405
- Country: United States
- Denomination: Pentecostal
- Website: thechurchontheway.org

History
- Status: Church
- Founded: 1926

Architecture
- Functional status: Active
- Years built: 1980-1981

The Church On The Way (The First Foursquare Church of Van Nuys) is a Pentecostal church in Van Nuys, California, led by Senior Pastor, Tim Clark. It is affiliated with the Foursquare Church. The church was formerly pastored by Jack Hayford and was widely influential in the Charismatic Movement in the 1970s through the 1990s, with services regularly televised on the Trinity Broadcasting Network and aired on its own local radio station. The church is related to several other churches of a similar name in Southern California, including La Iglesia En El Camino in Van Nuys, California and The Church On The Way, Santa Clarita in Santa Clarita, California. The Hollywood Cross, a landmark in Hollywood, California, is owned by the church.

== History ==
In 1926, a group of students from Life Bible College (now Life Pacific College) started a tent revival on Friar Street in Van Nuys, California. These prayer meetings developed into a church, which in the following year, was moved to a newly built facility on Erwin Street. In 1949, the church began building a new sanctuary, still located at 14344 Sherman Way, and completed it in 1951 with a marching band celebration down Van Nuys Blvd.

By 1969, the aging church had been reduced to a small number of elderly members. When Howard Carson, senior pastor at the time, became ill and decided to step down, Jack Hayford was appointed by the Foursquare Church as interim pastor. In 1971, he accepted the position as permanent senior pastor. Following Hayford's appointment, the church grew significantly. By 1974, the sanctuary had to be remodeled to increase capacity, and in 1981 the current sanctuary at 14300 Sherman Way was built. In 1987, as the church continued to outgrow its facilities, the church initiated the purchase of 14800 Sherman Way from the First Baptist Church of Van Nuys.

In 1999, when Jack Hayford retired, his son-in-law, Scott Bauer, was installed as his successor, serving as senior pastor until his sudden death in 2003. Between 2004 and 2010, Jim Tolle served as senior pastor of both the English and Spanish speaking congregations, and in 2011 Ricky Temple pastored the English speaking congregation for a year until 2013, when Tim Clark was named as senior pastor of the church, his term beginning in early 2014.
