= Jack W. Hayford =

American pastor (1934–2023)

Jack Hayford
- Born: Jack Williams Hayford; June 25, 1934; Los Angeles, California, U.S.
- Died: January 8, 2023 (aged 88); Los Angeles, California, U.S.
- Education: B.A. Life Pacific University; B.A. Azusa Pacific University; DD. Life Pacific University
- Alma mater: Life Pacific University, 1956
- Occupation: Minister
- Spouses: Anna Smith (m. 1955; died 2017); Valerie Lemire (m. 2018)
- Children: 4
- Religion: Pentecostal
- Congregations served: The Church on the Way 1969–1999
- Offices held: President, International Church of the Foursquare Gospel President Life Pacific University 1977-1982 Chancellor The King's University
- Website: jackhayford.com

Jack Hayford (June 25, 1934 – January 8, 2023) was an American Pentecostal minister, author, songwriter, and broadcaster. He is best known for serving as the senior pastor of The Church on the Way (formerly First Foursquare Church of Van Nuys, California) from 1969 to 1999, a congregation that became one of the early megachurches in the United States. Hayford also served as the fifth President of the International Church of the Foursquare Gospel from 2004 to 2009.

Hayford wrote more than 600 hymns and choruses. He wrote and composed the worship song "Majesty" (1978). The fourth president of Life Pacific University from 1977 to 1982. In his later years, he founded The King's University (originally The King's College and Seminary in Van Nuys, CA), which relocated to TX, where he served as Chancellor. His lifetime contributions to ministry and religious broadcasting were recognized with his 2014 induction into the National Religious Broadcasters Hall of Fame.

== Early life and education ==
Jack Williams Hayford was born on June 25, 1934, in Los Angeles, California, to Anita Dolores (née Farnsworth) (1916–1997) and Jack Hayford (1911–1979), who had married two years earlier on September 28, 1932. Hayford was born with a muscular condition in his neck, which improved later. His father had served in the military as a young man and worked as a switchman for the Southern Pacific Railroad. Hayford's mother, Dolores, was a Bible teacher who spoke at interdenominational women's classes and Women's Aglow Fellowship (now Aglow International). Although Hayford's parents did not always attend church, he has credited them with providing him with a Christian upbringing.

Hayford was raised in Oakland, California, and attended Oakland Technical High School. After graduating in 1952, Hayford moved back to Los Angeles to attend Life Pacific University (formerly L.I.F.E. Bible College) and received his first bachelor's degree in 1956. Nearer to middle age, he would earn a second bachelor's degree, from Azusa Pacific University (APU, graduating 1970).

== Career ==
=== Early academic and pastoral appointments ===
Early in Hayford's Career, he served as the National Youth Director of International Church of the Foursquare Gospel. He then joined the faculty of his alma mater, L.I.F.E., and went on to become dean of students there. (In that time, he began work on his second bachelor's degree, at APU.)

In 1969, while serving as dean at L.I.F.E. and finishing his APU degree, Hayford was asked to pastor a small congregation, the First Foursquare Church of Van Nuys, California, a congregation of only 18 members, with an average age of 65 years. While Hayford had initially agreed to pastor the church for only a period of six months, he later felt compelled to remain permanently. Only a few weeks from accepting an offer to pastor another Foursquare church, Hayford met with Foursquare denomination president Rolf McPherson, stating that he wanted to remain with the Van Nuys congregation. By the early 1980s, The Church on the Way had become one of the early megachurches in the United States and, at one point, reported a membership exceeding 10,000, making it one of the largest churches in the Foursquare denomination. Actor Dean Jones (deceased), a close friend of Hayford's, was an elder in the church, as was Pat Boone, along with Jan and Paul Crouch (founders of Trinity Broadcasting Network, which regularly broadcast services from the church).

== Broadcasting and hymn writing ==
Hayford wrote more than 600 hymns and choruses. He wrote and composed the 1978 hymn "Majesty", which has been included in published lists of the top 100 contemporary hymns, and is performed in churches around the world.

== Latter years ==
In the late 1990s, Hayford said that he felt called to establish a Pentecostal seminary in Los Angeles to train other pastors, and founded The King's College and Seminary, which later became known as The King's University. In 1999, he resigned as the senior pastor of The Church On The Way to focus on the college, although he briefly returned to help the church through a difficult transition after his successor and son-in-law, Scott Bauer, died suddenly. On October 4, 2004, Hayford was elected to a four-year term as president of the Foursquare denomination, a position he chose not to pursue after that single term. In 2013, Hayford said that he felt called to relocate The King's University to Southlake, Texas, under the stewardship of Gateway Church. In 2015, The Church On The Way, led by senior pastor Tim Clark, honored Hayford with the title of Pastor Emeritus in recognition of his continuing contributions to church management and oversight.

== Awards and recognition ==
In March 2014, Hayford was inducted into the National Religious Broadcasters Hall of Fame. He has also won the Gospel Music Association's Dove Award for his part in the album God With Us and the Salvation Army's William Booth Award, as well as serving as Worship Leader on the Men In Worship album.

Over the course of his life, Hayford has also been awarded several honorary degrees, including doctorates from Life Pacific College (Hon. D.Th.), and Oral Roberts University (Hon. D.D.), and one for literature from California Graduate School of Theology (Hon. D.D.).

== Personal life ==
On July 4, 1954, Hayford married his college sweetheart, Anna Marie Smith. Their marriage produced four children (Rebecca, Jack III, Mark, and Christa). In early 2016, Anna was diagnosed with stage 4 pancreatic cancer, and died in 2017. Hayford married Valerie Lemire the following year, and they lived in the San Fernando Valley of Los Angeles. He discontinued making public appearances in 2019.

Hayford died at his home in Los Angeles on January 8, 2023, at the age of 88.

== Published works ==
The following are some of the published works of the title subject:

- Prayer is Invading the Impossible. revised ed. (Logos International, 1977) ISBN 9780882702186
- The Key to Everything (Creation House) ISBN 9780884193425
- The Church On The Way (Marshalls Paperbacks, 1985) ISBN 0551012323
- Moments with Majesty (Multnomah Books, 1990) ISBN 0880703652
- Kingdom Warfare: Prayer, Spiritual Warfare, and the Ministry of Angels (Tommy Nelson, 1993)ISBN 0840784333
- The Power and Blessing (Victor Books, 1994) ISBN 1564764818
- Glory on Your House (Chosen Books, 1994) ISBN 0800792181
- The Beauty of Spiritual Language (Thomas Nelson, 1996) ISBN 0785272682
- The Heart of Praise (Regal Books, 1997) ISBN 0830716092
- Built by the Spirit/Rebuilding the Real You: Nehemiah (Regal Books, 1997) ISBN 1599794713
- Pastors of Promise(Regal Books, 1997) ISBN 0830718079
- Hayford's Bible Handbook (Thomas Nelson, 1999) ISBN 0785243062
- Grounds for Living, sound teaching for sure footing in Growth & Grace (Sovereign, 2001) ISBN 080079320X
- Rebuilding the Real You (Charisma House, 2013) ISBN 9780916847364
