= Oslo trilogy =

Norwegian film trilogy

- Directed by: Joachim Trier
- Written by: Joachim Trier and Eskil Vogt
- Edited by: Olivier Bugge Coutté
- Music by: Ola Fløttum
- Release dates: 3 July 2006 (Reprise); 19 May 2011 (Oslo, August 31st); 8 July 2021 (The Worst Person in the World)
- Country: Norway
- Language: Norwegian

The Oslo trilogy (Norwegian: Oslo-trilogien) consists of the Norwegian drama films Reprise (2006), Oslo, August 31st (2011) and The Worst Person in the World (2021). The three standalone films are all set in Oslo and feature the actor Anders Danielsen Lie in a leading role. They were directed by Joachim Trier who co-wrote them with Eskil Vogt.

== Films ==
=== Reprise ===
Reprise (2006) is about two Norwegian men in their 20s who struggle with personal relationships and burgeoning careers as novelists.

=== Oslo, August 31st ===
Oslo, August 31st (2011) is loosely based on the French novel Will O' the Wisp by Pierre Drieu La Rochelle, with the plot relocated to Oslo instead of Paris. It is about a recovering heroin addict who tries to reconnect with old friends and society during one day.

=== The Worst Person in the World ===
The Worst Person in the World (2021) follows four years of a woman's life as she navigates complex romantic and family relationships.

== Cast and crew ==
The actor Anders Danielsen Lie plays a leading role in all films of the trilogy. The three films were co-written by Joachim Trier and Eskil Vogt and directed by Trier. They feature original music composed by Ola Fløttum and were edited by Olivier Bugge Coutté.

== Themes ==
The common theme of the three films is social exclusion. Although Trier's and Vogt's film Thelma (2017) is also set in Oslo and is about being an outsider, the filmmakers do not consider it as part of the trilogy.

== Reception ==
All three films were well received by critics and won awards at film festivals and at Norway's Amanda Awards. Reprise and The Worst Person in the World received the Amanda Award for Best Film and Trier received the Amanda Award for Best Directing for Reprise and Oslo, August 31st. Renate Reinsve won the Cannes Film Festival Award for Best Actress for her performance in The Worst Person in the World. Oslo, August 31st and The Worst Person in the World were nominated for the César Award for Best Foreign Film. The Worst Person in the World was nominated for Best International Feature Film and Best Original Screenplay at the 94th Academy Awards.
