= The Fishing Place =

- Directed by: Rob Tregenza
- Written by: Rob Tregenza; Kirk Kjeldsen
- Starring: Ellen Dorrit Petersen
- Release date: November 22, 2024
- Running time: 94 minutes
- Country: Norway
- Language: Norwegian

The Fishing Place is a 2024 Norwegian drama film written by Rob Tregenza and Kirk Kjeldsen, directed by Tregenza and starring Ellen Dorrit Petersen.

== Cast ==
- Ellen Dorrit Petersen as Anna
- Andreas Lust as Priest
- Frode Winther as Hansen
- Eindride Eidsvold

== Release ==
The film was released in the United States on February 7, 2025.

== Reception ==
Christophe Bilien of Film Threat scored the film a 7 out of 10. Julian Roman of MovieWeb scored the film a 1.5 out of 5. Zach Lewis of Slant Magazine awarded the film three and a half stars out of four.
