= A Woman at Her Window =

- Directed by: Pierre Granier-Deferre
- Screenplay by: Jorge Semprún; Pierre Granier-Deferre
- Based on: Hotel Acropolis by Pierre Drieu La Rochelle
- Produced by: Albina du Boisrouvray; Hans Pflüger
- Starring: Romy Schneider; Philippe Noiret; Victor Lanoux; Umberto Orsini
- Cinematography: Aldo Tonti
- Edited by: Jean Ravel
- Music by: Carlo Rustichelli
- Distributed by: SNC
- Release date: 10 November 1976
- Running time: 110 minutes
- Country: France
- Language: French
- Box office: $9 million

A Woman at Her Window (French: Une femme à sa fenêtre) is a 1976 French drama film directed by Pierre Granier-Deferre, starring Romy Schneider, Philippe Noiret, Victor Lanoux and Umberto Orsini. Based on the 1929 novel Hotel Acropolis by Pierre Drieu La Rochelle, it tells the story of a woman who helps a union leader sought by police in 1930s Greece.

The film had 1,205,887 admissions in France. At the 2nd César Awards, Schneider was nominated for Best Actress and Jean Ravel was nominated for Best Editing.

== Plot ==
In Greece in 1936, Rico and Margot are married in name only. He pursues other women while she, rich and beautiful, has many suitors, the most bearable being Raoul. Outwardly frivolous, what she wants is not an extramarital affair but a grand passion. One hot night in August she sees from her window a man pursued by the police of the antidemocratic Greece regime, and on an impulse lets him hide in her bedroom. He is Michel, an anti-regime militant whose courage, idealism, and humanity overwhelm her. To hide him from the police, she gets him hired as chauffeur to Raoul and the two then disappear together. Rico and Raoul try to find her, but in vain. In 1967 a young woman visits Greece, trying to find traces of her parents: Margot and Michel.

== Cast ==
- Romy Schneider as Margot (Santorini)
- Philippe Noiret as Raoul Malfosse
- Victor Lanoux as Michel Boutros
- Umberto Orsini as Rico (Santorini)
- Gastone Moschin as Primoukis
- Delia Boccardo as Dora Cooper
- Martine Brochard as Avghi
- Nelli Riga as Amalia
- Joachim Hansen as Stahlbaum
- Carl Möhner as Von Pahlen
- Vasilis Kolovos as Andréas
- Paul Muller as Le Directeur
- Camille Piton as Le Gardien
- Aldo Farina as L'Américain
