= Jacques Rigaut =

French poet (1898–1929)

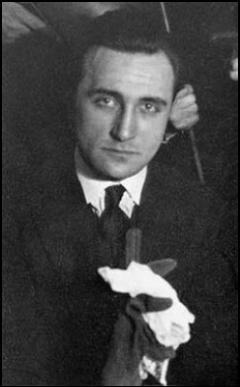
Jacques Rigaut

Jacques Rigaut (French pronunciation: [ʁiɡo]; 30 December 1898 – 9 November 1929) was a French poet associated with dada and surrealism.

== Life ==
Born in Paris, he was part of the Dadaist movement. His works frequently talked about suicide and he came to regard its successful completion as his occupation. In 1929, at Châtenay-Malabry, aged 30, as he had announced, Rigaut shot himself, using a ruler to be sure the bullet would pass through his heart.

He is buried in the Cimetière de Montmartre.

== Legacy ==
His suicide inspired the book Le Feu Follet by Pierre Drieu la Rochelle. The movie The Fire Within from Louis Malle is based on this book. The movie Oslo, August 31st directed by Joachim Trier, released in 2011, is also largely based on Le Feu Follet although the narrative takes place in contemporary Norway.

The Granada-based Spanish indie pop band Lori Meyers has a song entitled "La Vida de Jacques Rigaut" ("The Life of Jacques Rigaut") with its lyrics relating to his life.

== Publications ==
- "Propos Amorphes," Action, no. 4 (1920).
- "Je serai sérieux comme le plaisir," Littérature, no. 17 (1920); "Jacques Rigaut," tr. Terry Hale in Four Dada Suicides (London: Atlas Press, 1995).
- "Roman d'un jeune homme pauvre," Littérature, no. 18 (1921); "Story of a Poor Young Man," tr. Terry Hale in Four Dada Suicides (London: Atlas Press, 1995).
- "Fable," Salon Dada (June 1921).
- "L'Affaire Barrès," Littérature, no. 20 (1921).
- "Mae Murray," Littérature, new series, no. 1 (1922).
- "Un brillant sujet," Littérature, new series, no. 2 (1922); "A Brilliant Individual," tr. Terry Hale in Four Dada Suicides (London: Atlas Press, 1995).
- "Lignes," Little Review, vol. 9 (1923).

=== Posthumous publications ===
- "Lord Patchogue," Nouvelle Revue Française, no. 203 (1 August 1930); "Lord Patchogue," tr. Samuel Putnam, in European Caravan, vol. 1 (New York: Brewer, Warren and Putnam, 1931); "Lord Patchogue," tr. Terry Hale in Four Dada Suicides (London: Atlas Press, 1995).
- "Agence Générale du Suicide," Voix d'encre (2015); "The General Suicide Agency," tr. Terry Hale in Four Dada Suicides (London: Atlas Press, 1995).
- Et puis merde! with Paul Chadourne and Pierre Drieu La Rochelle (Paris: Libraires entre les lignes, 1998).

=== Collected works ===
- Écrits, ed. Martin Kay (Paris: Gallimard, 1970).
