= Nobel (TV series) =

2016 Norwegian television series

- Also known as: Nobel – fred for enhver pris
- Genre: War drama; Political thriller; Nordic noir
- Directed by: Per-Olav Sørensen
- Starring: Aksel Hennie; Anders Danielsen Lie; Tuva Novotny; Christian Rubeck; Atheer Adel; Danica Curcic; Odd-Magnus Williamson
- Country of origin: Norway
- Original language: Norwegian
- No. of seasons: 1
- No. of episodes: 8

Production
- Producers: Tone C. Rønning; Håkon Briseid
- Production locations: Oslo, Norway; Prague, Czech Republic; Morocco
- Production company: Monster Scripted

Original release
- Network: NRK
- Release: 25 September – 6 November 2016

Nobel is a 2016 Norwegian television series that premiered on NRK on 25 September 2016. It depicts Norway’s military involvement in Afghanistan. It was produced by Monster Scripted for the Norwegian broadcaster NRK and was broadcast under the title Nobel – fred for enhver pris (Nobel – Peace at Any Cost). The series under the title Nobel was made available on Netflix for streaming on 13 December 2016. Nobel was subsequently removed from Netflix in November 2020.

== Background ==
The series originated from its director Per-Olav Sørensen who was interested in making a contemporary story about Norwegian soldiers involved in military operations in Afghanistan. The script was written with Mette Marit Bøstad and Stephen Uhlander. The producer Håkon Briseid pitched the idea to NRK who then commissioned the TV series. The series was filmed in Oslo, Prague and Morocco in 2015. The production cost 68 million Norwegian krone (€7.9m), and the series is a co-production with Sirena Film in collaboration with DR (Denmark), SVT (Sweden) and RÚV (Iceland) with support from the Norwegian Film Institute and Nordisk Film & TV Fond.

The series was acquired for broadcast in France, Israel, and the Benelux countries. It was also sold to Netflix for streaming in various English-speaking countries. The first episode of seven was broadcast as a double episode in Norway, but released as two single episodes on Netflix, making a total of eight episodes for the series.

== Cast ==
- Aksel Hennie as Lieutenant Erling Riiser, a paratrooper patrol commander
- Tuva Novotny as Johanne Riiser, Erling's wife and the Foreign Minister's Chief of Staff
- Anders Danielsen Lie as Lieutenant Jon Petter Hals, paratrooper patrol commander prior to Erling
- Dennis Storhøi as Brigadier Jørund Ekeberg, Head of Forsvarets Spesialkommando
- Mads Sjøgård Pettersen as Lieutenant Håvard Bakkeli
- Danica Curcic as Lieutenant Adella Hanefi, an interpreter in the Norwegian Intelligence Service
- Christian Rubeck as Minister of Foreign Affairs Johan Ruud
- Odd-Magnus Williamson as Second Lieutenant Hans Ivar Johansen
- Kyrre Hellum as Major Jan Burås, Erling's superior officer
- Mattis Herman Nyquist as Hektor Stolt-Hansen, Project Manager for the "Fruit for Life" aid organization
- Amund Wiegand Blakstvedt as Rikard Riiser, Erling's and Johanne's son
- Hallvard Holmen as Rolf Innherad, a geologist representing Olje for utvikling (OFU)
- Atheer Adel as Sharif Zamani, a powerful landowner with ties to Taliban
- Mohammad-Ali Behboudi as Mullah Ahmed, the Taliban commander in the Balkh Province
- Ayesha Wolasmal as Wasima Zamani, Sharif's wife and cousin
- Ramin Yazdani as Heydar Zamani, Sharif's uncle and personal advisor
- André Jerman as Kristoffer Abel, The Foreign Minister's Director of communications
- Rolf Kristian Larsen as Sven Rasch, a War correspondent for VG
- Eirik Evjen as Sergeant Sigurd Sønsteby
- Ingrid Jørgensen Dragland as Minister of Defence Kjersti Mo
- Heidi Toini as Charlotte Heiberg, Johanne's personal assistant
- Ellen Horn as Nora Backer, the Chairwoman of the Norwegian Nobel Committee
- Samuel Fröler as Gunnar Riiser, Erling's father and a former professional jockey

== Reception ==
The series was generally well-received by Norwegian critics. Kjetil Lismoen of Aftenposten praised the acting and found the portrayal of the political machinations and the cost that comes from being involved in a war credible. Marie Kleve of Dagbladet considered the series to be socially relevant and significant while at the same time also entertaining to viewers. Øystein David Johansen of VG thought it an ambitious series with outstanding portrayal of the troops in Afghanistan, but found that it was the human drama in the series that impressed him most.

The premiere double episode was watched initially by 750,000 viewers excluding online viewers in Norway (a market share of 45%), with its Total Screen rating reaching 1.322 million viewers when online viewings over a longer period are included. There were over 1 million total viewers for every episode of the series. The final episode was watched by 703,000 viewers on its initial broadcast, with its total audience expected to reach 1.2 million.

The series was nominated for the 2016 Prix Italia in the TV drama category. It won the 2016 Prix Europa Media Award for Best European TV movie/mini-series, and in 2017, it won the Rose d'Or in the Drama Series category.

== Episodes ==
No.	Title	Directed by	Written by	Original airdate (Norway)	Netflix airdate
1	"Episode 1.1"	Per-Olav Sørensen	Mette M. Bølstad & Stephen Uhlander	25 September 2016	13 December 2016
2	"Episode 1.2"	Per-Olav Sørensen	Mette M. Bølstad & Stephen Uhlander	25 September 2016	13 December 2016
3	"Episode 1.3"	Per-Olav Sørensen	Mette M. Bølstad & Stephen Uhlander	2 October 2016	13 December 2016
4	"Episode 1.4"	Per-Olav Sørensen	Mette M. Bølstad & Stephen Uhlander	9 October 2016	13 December 2016
5	"Episode 1.5"	Per-Olav Sørensen	Mette M. Bølstad & Stephen Uhlander	16 October 2016	13 December 2016
6	"Episode 1.6"	Per-Olav Sørensen	Mette M. Bølstad & Stephen Uhlander	23 October 2016	13 December 2016
7	"Episode 1.7"	Per-Olav Sørensen	Mette M. Bølstad & Stephen Uhlander	30 October 2016	13 December 2016
8	"Episode 1.8"	Per-Olav Sørensen	Mette M. Bølstad & Stephen Uhlander	6 November 2016	13 December 2016

== Awards and nominations ==
Year	Organization	Category	Result	Ref.
2016	Prix Italia	TV drama	Nominated	
2016	Prix Europa	Best European TV movie/mini-series	Won	
2017	Gullruten	Best TV drama	Nominated	
2017	Rose d'Or	Drama series	Won	

== Home Video ==
Nobel was released on DVD in the UK on 12 November 2018.
