= Low Expectations =

2026 film by Eivind Landsvik

- Norwegian: Lave forventninger
- Directed by: Eivind Landsvik
- Written by: Eivind Landsvik
- Produced by: Lotte Sandbu; Synnøve Hørsdal
- Starring: Marie Ulven; Tone Mostraum; Anders Danielsen Lie; Embla Berntsen; Snorre Kind Monsson
- Cinematography: Andreas Bjørseth
- Edited by: Patrick Larsgaard
- Music by: Frederikke Hoffmeier; Bendik Hovik Kjeldsberg
- Production companies: Maipo Film; Snowglobe Films
- Distributed by: Nordisk Film
- Release dates: 19 May 2026 (Cannes); 23 October 2026 (Norway)
- Running time: 105 minutes
- Countries: Norway; Denmark
- Language: Norwegian

Low Expectations (Norwegian: Lave forventninger) is a 2026 drama film written and directed by Eivind Landsvik, in his directorial debut. It stars Marie Ulven, better known by her stage name Girl in Red, in her feature acting debut. It is an international co-production of Norway and Denmark.

The film had its world premiere at the Directors' Fortnight section of the 2026 Cannes Film Festival on 19 May, where it was nominated for the Caméra d'Or. It is set to be released in Norwegian theatres on 23 October 2026.

== Premise ==
At the height of her career, a musician falls apart and returns to her hometown where she slowly rebuilds her life.

== Cast ==
- Marie Ulven as Maja
- Tone Mostraum as Astrid
- Anders Danielsen Lie as Johannes
- Embla Berntsen as Aida
- Snorre Kind Monsson as Oscar
- Clara Dessau as Caroline

== Production ==
In January 2025, it was reported that singer Girl in Red would make her acting debut in Low Expectations. During the same month, the project was presented at the Discovery Co-Production Platform at the Nordic Film Market. In April 2025, it received a €291,000 production grant from Eurimages. In January 2026, it returned to the Nordic Film Market and participated at the Works in Progress section.

Cinematographer Andreas Bjørseth shot the film on 16mm.

== Release ==
Low Expectations had its world premiere at the Directors' Fortnight section of the 2026 Cannes Film Festival in May 2026. Salaud Morisset acquired the film's international sales rights a year prior.

The film is set to release in Norwegian theatres on 23 October 2026.
