= Odd-Magnus Williamson =

Norwegian comedian and actor (born 1980)

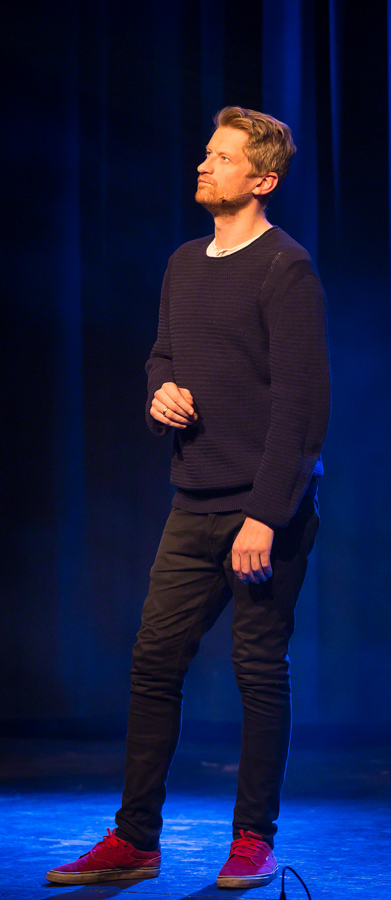
- Williamson in 2016
- Born: 14 September 1980 (age 44); Oslo, Norway
- Occupations: Actor; comedian; writer
- Spouse: Tinashe Bakas Roll (m. 2015)
- Children: 1

Odd-Magnus Williamson (born 14 September 1980) is a Norwegian comedian and actor. He is known to Norwegian television audiences for his recurring appearance in commercials for the grocery chain ICA and his performance on the Norwegian version of The Man Show.

== Biography ==
Williamson grew up at Nordstrand in Oslo. In 2006, he landed his first role in a movie, when he joined the cast of the Norwegian film Reprise, where he played Morten. In 2012, Williamson portrayed the Norwegian painter and sailor Erik Hesselberg, one of the members of Thor Heyerdahl's Kon-Tiki expedition, in a film of the same name.

In 2016, Williamson joined the main cast of the television drama series Aber Bergen where he plays defense attorney Erik Aber. He has also been a writer on the show. The same year, he began appearing in the miniseries Nobel, where he plays the soldier Hans Ivar Johansen.

As of 2019, Williamson appears on the HBO show Beforeigners, where he plays the corrupt police officer Jeppe. Since January 2020, he has acted in the Netflix series Ragnarok.

Williamson married Tinashe Bakas Roll in 2015, and they have one child together, a girl named Ziggy.

== Selected filmography ==
=== Film ===
List of film appearances, with year, title, and role shown
Year	Title	Role	Notes
2006	Reprise	Morten	
2010	En helt vanlig dag på jobben		
2012	Kon-Tiki	Erik Hesselberg	
2014	Captain Sabertooth and the Treasure of Lama Rama	Langemann	

=== Television ===
List of television appearances, with year, title, and role shown
Year	Title	Role	Notes
2013	Dag		1 episode
2016	Nobel	Second Lieutenant Hans Ivar Johansen	6 episodes
2016–2018	Aber Bergen	Erik Aber	12 episodes
2019—	Beforeigners	Jeppe	
2020–	Ragnarok	Erik	
