= Tone Danielsen =

Norwegian actress (born 1946)

- Born: 15 August 1946
- Occupation: Actor

Tone Danielsen (born 15 August 1946) is a Norwegian actress. She was an actress at Den Nationale Scene 1970–1971, the Hålogaland Teater 1971–1975, and from 1975 to the present at the National Theatre. She appeared in the film Reprise.

She is the granddaughter of Edvard Christian Danielsen and cousin of social anthropologist Berit Backer. Actor Anders Danielsen Lie is her son. She played the mother of his character in Reprise (2006); they also starred together in 22 July (2018), although their characters were not related.

== Selected filmography ==
- 1965: Skjær i sjøen as Eva Mørk, Johannes's daughter
- 1980: Belønningen as Unni
- 1986: Blackout
- 2006: Reprise as Inger
- 2008: Troubled Water as Liss
- 2009: Upperdog
- 2015–2016: Frikjent (TV series) as Sigrid Kvamme
- 2018: 22 July as Judge Wenche Arntzen
