= Olivier Bugge Coutté =

Danish film editor

- Born: Copenhagen, Denmark
- Occupation: Film editor

Olivier Bugge Coutté is a Danish film editor. He was nominated for an Academy Award in the category Best Film Editing for the film Sentimental Value.

== Selected filmography ==
- Reprise (2006)
- Beginners (2010)
- Oslo, August 31st (2011)
- Arthur Newman (2012)
- Louder Than Bombs (2015)
- Thelma (2017)
- The Good Traitor (2020)
- The Worst Person in the World (2021)
- The Pod Generation (2023)
- The Promised Land (2023)
- The Apprentice (2024)
- Sentimental Value (2025)
