= Berit Backer =

Norwegian anthropologist

- Born: August 3, 1947
- Died: March 7, 1993 (aged 45–46); Oslo
- Cause of death: Murder
- Occupation: social anthropologist
- Years active: 1969–1993.
- Known for: Working for Albanian causes, human rights activism, publishing papers, participating in documentaries, helping Kosovar Albanian refugees.
- Relatives: Edvard Christian Danielsen (grandfather); Tone Danielsen (first-cousin); Anders Danielsen Lie (second-cousin)

Berit Backer (August 3, 1947 – March 7, 1993) was a Norwegian social anthropologist and ethnographer, head of the Institute of Peace Research (PRIO) between 1978 and 1982 in Norway. Backer was a human rights activist who fought for Albanian national causes for much of her life. She published literature on Albanian family structures from studies conducted in the village of Isniq, in the Rugova valley of Kosovo. During her first visit to Albania in 1969, she became fascinated by the Albanians, and their culture and struggle for independence. She dedicated her research for a scholarly degree in social anthropology. Berit was fluent in Albanian.

She published the book Behind Stone Walls, a social anthropological study of traditional Albanian society. It focuses on the formation and evolution of household and family structures among the Kosovo Albanians. It was written on the basis of fieldwork carried in the village of Isniq in western Kosovo in 1975. Backer died suddenly in 1993 after having been stabbed to death by a mentally disturbed person. John Halliday, editor of the memoirs of Enver Hoxha called her "an Albanian expert". In 2018, Kosovos prime minister Hashim Thaqi dedicated the Presidential Jubilee Award to the Backer family.

== Background ==
Berit Backer was born on August 3, 1947, as the daughter of dedicated communist Ina Margrethe Danielsen (daughter of Edvard Christian Danielsen) and Norwegian allied war photographer Ola Friele Backer who had photographed the invading Germans in Bergen. They married shortly after the war. However, Ola died one month after Berit was born. Berit grew up in rough circumstances living in Kirkenes in northern Norway and moving several times. As the young daughter of a communist, Berit was sent to pioneer camps during summer vacations. She suffered bullying from other children which supposedly shaped her political views. After she finished secondary school she took a course at the Nansen School in Lillehammer in 1965–1966, and later, in the spring of 1968, she registered as a student at the University of Bergen. During the following years she studied statistics, social anthropology, philosophy and sociology. In opposition to her mother, Berit joined ranks with other young radicals towards the end of the sixties. Her interest in Albania was ignited when she visited the so-called “Lighthouse of Socialism” for the first time in 1969.

== Anthropological studies ==
Berit Backer became very popular amongst Albanian activists for her dedication working around the clock. Unable to visit Albania, she traveled to Kosovo in 1974–1975 being one of the first foreigners to conduct anthropological work. Her work was submitted as a master thesis for the Institute of Social Anthropology of the University of Oslo in April 1979. In 1982 she published a study of the self-reliance culture in Albania. At the time, Albania was the only country in the world without any debts. In 1990, Ann Christine Eek, a photographer at the University of Ethnographic Museum in Oslo, worked with Berit on an exhibition of Albanian culture in 1990 producing a book titled "Albanske tradisjoner" published in 1991. Between 1975 and 2007, Eek made journeys to former Yugoslavia together with Backer to study the rural life of villages. However the project had to be finished by Eek alone after Backer was killed. In 1992, Backer participated in a documentary film titled "The Albanians of Rrogam" in Rrogam and Thethi, Albania where she met villagers waiting for government officials to decide on the privatization of agricultural lands after the fall of communism. Berit stated in her studies that the Albanian old legal structures and rights to decide on family matters and feuds without state involvement was a characteristic which had enabled Albanians of Kosovo to survive Yugoslav oppression. She also writes that the rural ideal of a man in the village of Isniq was not someone who easily fell in love, as this was a sign of unreliability and immaturity, but rather someone who could keep women at a distance. Backer stated that in 1975 there were more Albanian girls in school than boys and that the 1981 economic crash forced women to be dependent on their husbands. Berit writes that the nusë does not move freely in the house she arrives at until years later.

== Death ==
Backer was suddenly stabbed to death on Mars 7, 1993, in Norway by a 29-year old asylum seeking Kosovar Albanian man suffering from paranoia. The trial at the City Court of Oslo concluded that the perpetrator was mentally unstable and was sentenced to five years of preventive detention inside the psychiatric health service. He received citizenship in 2001. According to photographer Per Erik Åström, who had been in a relationship with Berit, the perpetrator had murdered Berit at her home as a result of her work of abortion laws for Albanian migrant women in Norway. According to the police interrogation, he had been deeply offended by "her immoral suggestions" and that "it was his duty to deliver a punishment". The police found the perpetrators body in 2013 in a lake.

== Bibliography ==
- Behind Stone Walls : Changing Household Organisation among the Albanians of Kosovo.
- Self-Reliance under Socialism – The Case of Albania
