= Edvard Christian Danielsen =

Norwegian naval officer (1888–1964)

Vice Admiral Edvard Christian Danielsen
- Born: 14 April 1888; Mandal in Vest-Agder, Norway.
- Died: 30 January 1964 (aged 75)
- Relatives: Tone Danielsen (granddaughter); Berit Backer (granddaughter); Anders Danielsen Lie (great-grandson)
- Military career
- Allegiance: Norwegian
- Branch: Royal Norwegian Navy
- Service years: 1909-1951
- Rank: Vice Admiral and Chief of naval operations
- Awards: War Cross with Sword (1943)

Edvard Christian Danielsen (14 April 1888 – 30 January 1964) was a Norwegian naval officer. He held the rank of Vice admiral in the Royal Norwegian Navy and was chief of the admiral staff in London during World War II.

== Personal life ==
Danielsen was born at Mandal in Vest-Agder, Norway. He was the son of Daniel D. Danielsen (1842–95) and Margrethe Cecilie Jensen (1855-1939). He married Julie Lie Torjussen in 1915.

== Military career ==
Danielsen started as a cadet in the Royal Norwegian Naval Academy in 1906 and graduated in 1909. Danielsen entered the Royal Norwegian Navy and was in continuous submarine service from 1917 until 1936. He was appointed to captain in 1924 and was chief of the submarine division from 1934 to 1936.

After the German invasion of Norway in 1940, he worked on behalf of the Norwegian resistance movement in cooperation with the British Secret Intelligence Service (MI6). After Henry Diesen resigned his position in August 1941, Danielsen was promoted to Rear Admiral and served chief of the admiral staff in London.

After the liberation of Norway in 1945, Danielsen was appointed Vice Admiral and served as naval chief from May 1949 until he sought leave during 1951.

== Other sources ==
- Bjørn Rørholt; Bjarne Thorsen (1990) Usynlige soldater – Nordmenn i Secret Service forteller (Oslo: Aschehoug Forlag) ISBN 82-03-16046-8
