= Anders Danielsen Lie =

Norwegian actor and musician (born 1979)

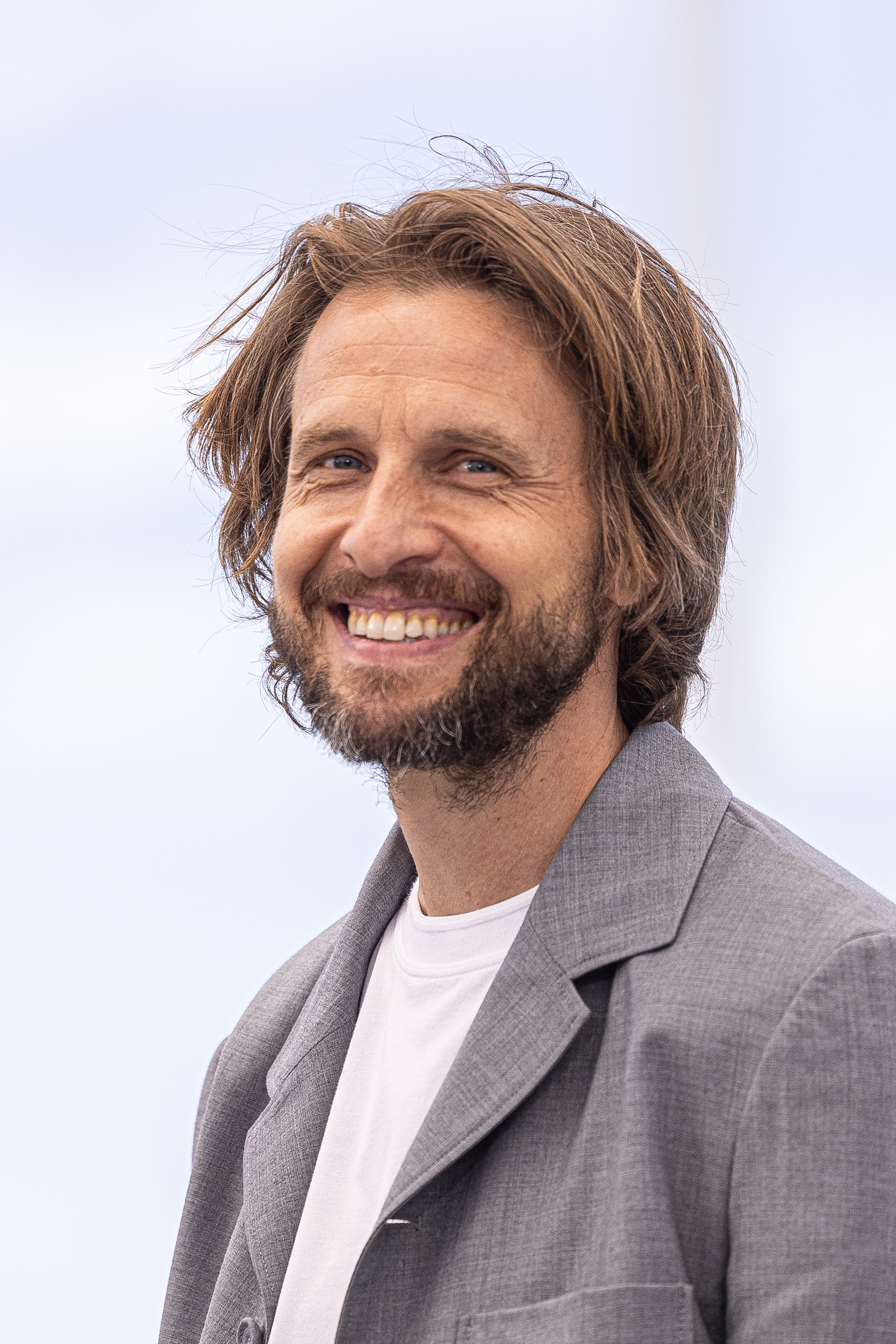
- Lie at the 2025 Cannes Film Festival
- Born: 1 January 1979 (age 47); Oslo, Norway
- Education: University of Oslo
- Occupations: Actor; musician; medical doctor
- Years active: 1990–present
- Spouse: Iselin Steiro (m. 2008)
- Children: 2
- Mother: Tone Danielsen
- Relatives: Edvard Christian Danielsen (great-grandfather); Berit Backer (cousin)

Anders Danielsen Lie (Norwegian: [ˈɑ̂nːəʂ ˈdɑ̀nɪɛlsn̩ ˈliː]; born 1 January 1979) is a Norwegian actor, musician, and physician.

== Education ==
Danielsen Lie studied Ancient Greek (1997–1998), musicology (2001–2003) and medicine (1999–2007) at the University of Oslo.

== Career ==
=== Acting career ===
Danielsen Lie made his film debut when he was 11 years old in the title role of Herman (1990) by Erik Gustavson. After that, he did not act for 16 years, but then he was approached by director Joachim Trier to audition for Trier's film Reprise. He was given the role, and took a year off from medical school to star in the film. He has since acted in several of Trier's films, with leading roles in Reprise (2006), Oslo, August 31st (2011) and The Worst Person in the World (2021), also known as the Oslo trilogy. Oslo, August 31st was selected for Un Certain Regard at the 2011 Cannes Film Festival. Guardian critic Peter Bradshaw included Danielsen Lie on his top-ten list of the best male performances of 2011. In 2016, he starred alongside Kristen Stewart in Olivier Assayas' supernatural psychological thriller film Personal Shopper, which was selected for main competition at the 69th Cannes film festival. Danielsen Lie is known for playing emotionally complex, sometimes mentally disturbed, characters. In 2018, he portrayed Anders Behring Breivik, the perpetrator of the 2011 Norway attacks, in Paul Greengrass's docudrama 22 July. Danielsen Lie has played Norwegian, English and French-speaking roles. He performed two different versions of his role in The Night Eats the World, one in English and one in French. In 2017, he made his stage acting debut in the role of obituary writer Daniel Woolf in Patrick Marber's play Closer (1997).

Danielsen Lie played major roles in the 2021 films The Worst Person in the World by Joachim Trier and Bergman Island by Mia Hansen-Løve. Both films were selected for main competition at the 2021 Cannes Film Festival. For his part in The Worst Person in the World he received the 2022 National Society of Film Critics Award for Best Supporting Actor, and the performance was named one of the 10 best movie performances of 2021 by Time magazine. The film was also declared the best film of 2021 by Vanity Fair and The Atlantic. In March 2023, it was announced that he was set to work with Glenn Close on director Charlie McDowell's film adaptation of Tove Jansson's novel The Summer Book. Danielsen Lie plays iconic jazz pianist Bill Evans in the 2026 feature film Everybody Digs Bill Evans by director Grant Gee.

=== Music ===
Danielsen Lie is a multi-instrumentalist who plays the piano, guitar, bass guitar and drums. On 11 April 2011, he released This Is Autism, a concept album with music written, performed and produced by himself, loosely based on recordings from his childhood. On 2 February 2024, he released his second studio album, IDIOSYNCRASY.

=== Medical career ===
Anders Danielsen Lie is a medical doctor and in between movies maintains his practice working as a general practitioner with patients in Oslo. While promoting Bergman Island, he insisted: "It doesn't really work and I would never recommend that anybody else combine the two." However, he has continued to maintain both a successful acting career and his medical practice since graduating from medical school. After shooting The Worst Person in the World in the fall of 2020, he started working as a medical supervisor for the COVID-19 vaccination center and contact trace team in the Nordre Aker borough of Oslo.

In 2007, Danielsen Lie and psychologist Maria Øverås authored a Norwegian-language non-fiction sexual education book for young adults (Sex og sånt, Gyldendal, ISBN 9788205370463). The book received an award from the Royal Ministry of Culture and Equality for best non-fiction and was also nominated for the Brage Prize, one of Norway's most prestigious literary awards. He has also written extensively on public health-related topics for Norwegian newspapers and magazines.

== Personal life ==
Danielsen Lie is the son of Amanda Award-winning actor Tone Danielsen. He met Norwegian model Iselin Steiro in 2007, and they married on 5 July 2008. They have two daughters together.

== Selected filmography ==
Key
†	Denotes productions that have not yet been released

Year	Title	Role	Notes
1990	Herman	Herman	
2006	Reprise	Phillip	
2011	Oslo, August 31st	Anders	
2014	Fidelio: Alice's Odyssey	Felix	
2015	This Summer Feeling	Lawrence	
2016	Personal Shopper	Erwin	
2016	Approaching the Unknown	Greenstreet	
2016	Nobel	Lieutenant Jon Petter Hals	
2017	Cleo & Paul	David	
2018	The Night Eats the World	Sam	
2018	22 July	Anders Behring Breivik	
2021	The Worst Person in the World	Aksel	
2021	Bergman Island	Joseph/Himself	
2022	Sick of Myself	Doctor	
2024	Handling the Undead	David	
2024	Mothers' Instinct	Simon	
2024	The Summer Book	Father	
2024	Quisling: The Final Days	Peder Olsen	
2025	Sentimental Value	Jakob	
2026	Everybody Digs Bill Evans	Bill Evans	
2026	Low Expectations		
2026	Brave New Love†	Andreas	

== Awards and nominations ==
Year	Organization	Category	Role	Result	Ref.
2012	RiverRun International Film Festival	Best Actor, Honorable Mention	Oslo, August 31st	Won	
2017	Gullruten	Best Actor, TV Drama	Nobel	Nominated	
2022	National Society of Film Critics Awards	Best Supporting Actor	The Worst Person in the World	Won	
