= Borderliner =

Norwegian crime drama television series

- Genre: Crime drama
- Starring: Tobias Santelmann; Ellen Dorrit Petersen; Benjamin Helstad; Eivind Sander; Bjørn Skagestad; Thelma Farnes Ottersen; Todd Bishop Monrad Vistven
- Country of origin: Norway
- Original language: Norwegian
- No. of seasons: 1
- No. of episodes: 8

Production
- Production company: Monster

Original release
- Network: TV 2 Netflix
- Release: November 2, 2017

Borderliner (Norwegian: Grenseland) is a Norwegian noir crime drama series created by Megan Gallagher and Alexander Opsal that involves an Oslo police detective who becomes involved in a suicide investigation while visiting his hometown. The series first aired on November 2, 2017, in Norway on TV 2 and was released to Netflix on March 6, 2018. The series was removed from Netflix in March 2023.

== Plot ==
Nikolai Andreassen, a police detective from Oslo, is visiting his home town, near Tista river and Swedish border. He is drawn into the investigation of the suicide of a local man named Tommy Hagen; his co-investigator, Anniken Høygaard-Larsen, from the National Criminal Investigation Service, suspects foul play. Nikolai plants evidence in order to protect his younger brother, Lars, who appears to be implicated, but later discovers the truth behind Hagen's death.

== Cast ==
- Tobias Santelmann as Nikolai Andreassen, a detective from Oslo
- Ellen Dorrit Petersen as Anniken Høygaard-Larsen, a detective from the National Criminal Investigation Service
- Benjamin Helstad as Lars Andreassen, Nikolai's brother, a local police officer
- Bjørn Skagestad as Hans Olav Andreassen, Lars and Nikolai's father, formerly the local sheriff
- Eivind Sander as Josef Koldberg, owner of a brew pub and real estate developer
- Frode Winther as Bengt Skare, the local sheriff
- Morten Svartveit as Kristoffer Lund
- Stig Henrik Hoff as Sven Lindberg, a high-ranking officer in the National Criminal Investigation Service
- Ellen Birgitte Winther as Marta Hagen
- Ole Christoffer Ertvaag as Ove Dreyer
- Thelma Farnes Ottersen as Milla
- Todd Bishop Monrad Vistven as Erik
- Kim-Henning Nilsen as Tommy Hagen
- Cathrine Hoel Hansen as Matilde
- Frida Stavnes as Katia

== Episodes ==
No. in season	Title
1	"Nikolai's Dilemma"
Tommy Hagen is found hanging. His death is initially thought to be suicide, but there is evidence that leads to an investigation by Oslo detective Nikolai and NCIS agent Anniken. They learn that Hagen left the bar the previous night with Ove Dreyer. Dreyer says that Hagen said he was later meeting Lars Andreassen (Nikolai's younger brother). Lars's daughter told Nikolai that her father came home late the night before. In confrontation, Lars says that he and Hagen fought (the latter was accused of paedophilia). Lars said that he had stabbed and choked Hagen, and was stabbed in turn. Nikolai lets him go free, and stands up Anniken on a date. The episode concludes with Lars making a mysterious phone call.
2	"Lars' Deception"
Nikolai draws blood from Tommy's body in the morgue and plants it on a fence. Lab reports later confirm that Tommy's blood was found on the fence and points to the suicide theory. Josef Koldberg (owner of the bar) wants to be nominated as a candidate for Mayor but is surprised and angry when the committee nominates someone else. CCTV footage undermines the blood on the fence evidence and Anniken re-opens the investigation. Nikolai's dad Hans (ex-cop) confirms that he was with Tommy's wife on the night of murder. He also states that it was impossible for Tommy to have sex because of a medical condition and thus invalidates the accusation that Tommy was a paedophile. Lars states that he and Bengt cooked up the paedophile angle because they had stumbled on a cocaine stash (from a car crash) and wanted to make money from it, but Tommy asked for a cut. Nikolai, Lars and Bengt destroy evidence at the stash site. Lars takes Nikolai to the place where they had hidden the drugs and discovers the place empty. Bengt is seen fleeing with the drugs. Anniken discovers CCTV evidence from morgue that shows a white-coated person leaving the morgue.
3	"Anniken's chase"
The person leaving the morgue was identified as Ove. He and Bengt flee to Sweden to sell the drugs. Meanwhile the owners of the drugs are scouting the town to track down the drugs: they contact Josef. An eyewitness confirms that Tommy went through the fence and the suicide theory is again considered. Anniken wants to search the river for a possible weapon that cut Tommy's face. The divers are called in. But Nikolai and Lars scheme to remove the screwdriver before the divers start. Anniken finds that Ove had repeatedly called a number (his girlfriend Malin Ekblad) in Sweden. Nikolai and Lars decide to move the children to Hans' place. However Hans has split up with Marta and is very drunk so they ask Josef to mind the children for some time. Anniken goes to Sweden to trace Ekblad. Lars nearly drowns in his attempt to find the screwdriver and is rushed to the hospital by Nikolai. Anniken tells Nikolai that she has found Ove.
4	"Ove's Evidence"
The Swedish police want an arrest warrant to take Ove in for questioning. Anniken tracks down Malin, Ove's girlfriend, and finds Ove staying there. Nikolai and Lars think that the game is up and prepare to concede. Ove dodges Anniken and turns up for work. Nikolai and Bengt take him to the station for questioning. On the way Bengt loses control and fatally shoots Ove. Bengt creates a story that Ove pulled a gun and he had to shoot him. Anniken takes over the case as Nikolai has to appear before internal affairs. Nikolai asks for a lawyer for his defence but the lawyer turns out to be Nikolai's lover (Nikolai is gay). Divers do not find the screwdriver. Internal Affairs choose not to proceed against Bengt and Nikolai. Anniken links Ove to drugs.
5	"Bengt's Fate"
Bengt owes money to Josef and offers his motorcycle and drugs as payment. Ove's girlfriend tells Nikolai that Ove and Tommy plan to sell drugs and Ove told her that Bengt was also involved. The drug gangsters threaten Josef. Nikolai guides Anniken to the drug car crash site. Nikolai is worried that Bengt may kill Malin. Anniken suspects an inside job and takes DNA from all cops. The drug car is recovered and more drugs are found in it. Nikolai plants Bengt's gloves in the drug car evidence and blackmails him. Bengt in turn plants the screwdriver (which he had in his possession). Josef tells the drug lords about Bengt. The lab identifies DNA from Lars and Tommy on the screwdriver. Nikolai intercepts Bengt before he arrives at the drug rendezvous. The drug lords attack Bengt and Nikolai.
6	"Milla's Future"
Lars is arrested based on DNA evidence. Gangsters violently beat up Bengt, leaving him severely injured. Nikolai manages to call for help. The gangsters flee but - accosted by Annekin - Bengt shoots himself in the head and dies. Lars confesses to Anniken but falsely implicates Bengt as Tommy's killer, and his own role as just asking for a cut of drug money. He hopes to get out of prison in a year's time. Annekin and Nikolai return to their respective stations. Nikolai takes the children with him to Oslo. Nikolai turns to his earlier case involving Lingberg and Eva. Internal affairs feel Nikolai cannot be a witness since the defence will tear him apart on account of recent events. Nikolai comes clean to his lover Kristoffer, who gets angry because Lindberg, who is suspected of murdering Kristoffer's sister, will now walk. Nikolai finds new evidence from a mobile recovered from the drug car. He rushes to Anniken's place but is surprised to see Lindberg there.
7	"Josef's Chance"
Lindberg has a deal with Eva who in turn ropes Josef in. Nikolai is able to understand the code and warns of an impending drug shipment. Nikolai also gets a tip-off that Eva came to Josef's house, and that Josef had been in Sweden and was using a van. Nikolai intercepts Eva but is denied permission to arrest her for want of evidence. Josef takes the van into the garage for drug loading. The drug gangsters are tipped off and Josef's car is empty when intercepted. Meanwhile Nikolai's dad has taken the role of temporary sheriff (since he was one before retiring). Lindberg and the Drug gangsters begin to view Nikolai as a threat. Nikolai's relationship with the victim's brother is exposed. Nikolai asks Anniken for help in tracing a number but she declines. Josef finds Bengt's drug stash in the motorcycle rear tyre. Nikolai dials the mystery number only to find it ringing inside his dad's shirt.
8	"Olav's Secret"
Hans claims that he and Lindberg were working undercover to catch Eva. Anniken reaches the drug gangsters garage to find it empty. Eva and her accomplices reach Josef and collect the drug stash from him. Pressure is put on Nikolai to back off from Lindberg, Eva and Josef. Eva calls Nikolai and asks to meet. A mysterious envelope to Lindberg contains the incriminating video of Nikolai. Meanwhile it appears that Eva has handed over a gun with Lindberg's fingerprints to Nikolai. Josef gets arrested in a drug bust and the secrets are finally revealed.

== Reception ==
Erik Adams of the AV Club considers it a top pick. Meghan O'Keefe of Decider called the series "as dark and atmospheric as Scandi-noir comes, but it’s also elegantly beautiful and extremely tense".
