= The Night Eats the World =

- Theatrical release poster
- French: La nuit a dévoré le monde
- Literally: The Night Has Devoured the World
- Directed by: Dominique Rocher
- Screenplay by: Jérémie Guez; Guillaume Lemans; Dominique Rocher
- Based on: La nuit a dévoré le monde by Pit Agarmen
- Produced by: Carole Scotta
- Starring: Anders Danielsen Lie; Golshifteh Farahani; Denis Lavant; Sigrid Bouaziz
- Cinematography: Jordane Chouzenoux
- Edited by: Isabelle Manquillet
- Music by: David Gubitsch
- Production companies: Haut et Court; Canal+; Ciné+; What the Film; CNC
- Distributed by: Haut et Court (France); WTFilms (International)
- Release dates: 13 January 2018 (Angers); 7 March 2018 (France)
- Running time: 94 minutes
- Country: France
- Language: English

The Night Eats the World (French: La nuit a dévoré le monde) is a 2018 French English-language psychological drama thriller film directed by Dominique Rocher and written by Jérémie Guez, Guillaume Lemans, and Rocher, based on the novel of the same name by Pit Agarman. The film stars Anders Danielsen Lie, Golshifteh Farahani, and Denis Lavant, and follows Sam (Danielsen Lie) in the midst of a zombie apocalypse that suddenly overtakes Paris. The film premiered at the Angers Film Festival on 13 January 2018 and was theatrically released in France on 7 March 2018.

== Plot ==
Sam, a musician living in Paris, visits his ex-girlfriend Fanny to recover music tapes left in her possession. Fanny is holding a party and brushes Sam off multiple times before telling him the tapes are in the office. Sam is accidentally bumped by a partygoer on his way to the tapes. Once there, his nose starts to bleed and he passes out. Sounds of chaos erupt outside the door of the office, but Sam sleeps through it.

The next morning, Sam wakes to find the apartment trashed, with bloodstains on the walls and no one inside. He ventures into the stairway and discovers a zombified Fanny and others, who charge at him when he calls her name. Locking himself in her apartment, he witnesses a family escaping from an apartment across the street only to be swarmed and killed by zombies as they attempt to escape in their car. The apartment, which is several stories up, is the only safe location that Sam can find. The zombies have seemingly spread over all of Paris, are very fast moving, and respond in hordes to any sight or sound. They are also completely silent, making almost no noise and never vocalizing.

Unable to leave the apartment, Sam begins cleaning up until a shotgun blast erupts through the floor. Using a pipe to widen the hole, he discovers that one of the residents below has committed suicide, after killing his wife, whom he had bound to a chair after she became infected. He retrieves their shotgun and ventures outside, finding the zombies in the stairway gone. He quickly closes the doors to the building to seal himself inside. Sam explores the building's units one by one, finding most of them empty; he cordons off one floor after he narrowly avoids getting killed by a group of zombies waiting inside. He finds a zombified elderly man in the building's lift, binds the gate up, and begins conversing one-sidedly with the zombie whose name he learns is Alfred.

Sam successfully raids the building for a large quantity of supplies. He rations these and discovers musical equipment in one room, which he uses to entertain himself. As time passes, Sam becomes increasingly lonely and unhinged. Desperate for company, he attempts to capture a stray cat wandering aimlessly among the undead but is nearly killed by several zombies. He makes it back to the apartment and sees the cat beside one of the undead, apparently unconcerned; enraged, Sam shoots at the cat. Fearing he was bitten, Sam nearly kills himself a second time when he falls asleep with the shotgun placed beneath his head while waiting to see if he would turn.

As winter approaches, he is forced to contend with a lack of heat, and the water supply to the apartment building stops working. Surviving by collecting rainwater and creating a fireplace, Sam's mental state continues to decline. He notices one day that the streets are largely empty. Frustrated, Sam tests how far away the zombies are by loudly playing a drum set and screaming in rhythm. The undead return in hordes and nearly climb onto the apartment's balcony by piling atop one another. An enraged Sam continues to play despite the danger.

That night, Sam hears movement outside his bedroom door and fires the shotgun through it. He hears cries of pain and realizes he shot another person. He attempts emergency medical aid and finds the woman's bag, which has a large amount of rope and a grapple hook she uses to go from rooftop to rooftop. The next morning, Sam speaks to the woman, Sarah, who explains how she has survived. He retrieves supplies from the lowest apartment and methodically eliminates the remaining zombified occupants. She goes to the roof and tells Sam he will either die or go insane if he does not leave the apartment building. Sam at first brushes her off but relents. He returns to his room and finds Sarah dead from the gunshot, apparently indicating that his conversations with her after he shot her were just a hallucination. He mourns her loss, eulogizes her, and covers her body. Among her possessions he finds a camera with photos of her family, then later of himself standing on the rooftop.

Sam decides to leave the apartment, burning the tapes and releasing Alfred, who wanders into his nearby apartment where Sam locks him away. The burning tapes set off a fire alarm; zombies attack the building. They break down the doors and rush inside. Killing several and hiding in the smoke, Sam manages to get to the roof and swings across the street to the next building, where he climbs to the rooftop and stares out into the seemingly endless skyline of Paris. He briefly hears a sound that might indicate the existence of other survivors.

== Cast ==
- Anders Danielsen Lie as Sam
- Golshifteh Farahani as Sarah
- Denis Lavant as Alfred
- Sigrid Bouaziz as Fanny
- David Kammenos as Mathieu

== Reception ==
On review aggregator Rotten Tomatoes, the film holds an approval rating of 87% based on 46 reviews, with an average rating of 7.1/10. The website's critical consensus reads, "The Night Eats the World finds a few unexplored corners in the crowded zombie genre, with a refreshing emphasis on atmosphere and character development." On Metacritic, the film has a weighted average rating of 50 out of 100 based on ten critics, indicating "mixed or average reviews".

The Hollywood Reporter wrote, "Imagine 28 Days Later without the action, The Walking Dead without the ensemble cast or [REC] without the video camera and white-knuckle suspense, and you'll get an inkling of what goes on in The Night Eats the World (La Nuit a devore le monde). IndieWire said, "Night Eats the World embarks on a complex meditation that makes it the most innovative zombie movie since Edgar Wright's Shaun of the Dead." Variety wrote, "Even within the fairly small number of movies about a lone (or nearly-alone) survivor facing some endless apocalyptic or purgatorial non-future, “Night” is short on ideas."

The film received Best Picture Award in Canary Islands Fantastic Film Festival - Isla Calavera 2018.
