= Blind (2014 film) =

2014 film by Eskil Vogt

- Film poster
- Directed by: Eskil Vogt
- Written by: Eskil Vogt
- Produced by: Sigve Endresen, Hans-Jørgen Osnes
- Cinematography: Thimios Bakatakis
- Edited by: Jens Christian Fodstad
- Music by: Henk Hofstede
- Production companies: Lemming Film, Motlys
- Distributed by: Cinéart
- Release dates: 17 January 2014 (Sundance); 26 February 2014 (Norway)
- Running time: 96 minutes
- Country: Norway
- Language: Norwegian

Blind is a 2014 Norwegian drama film written and directed by Eskil Vogt. The film premiered in-competition in the World Cinema Dramatic Competition at 2014 Sundance Film Festival on 19 January. Vogt received the Screenwriting Award for Blind at Sundance. The film was later screened in the Panorama section of the 64th Berlin International Film Festival, and was nominated for the 2014 Nordic Council Film Prize.

== Plot ==
Forsaken in a brand-new apartment in Oslo, frail author Ingrid is trying to come to terms with losing her eyesight in mid-life. Fearful of venturing out on her own, Ingrid retreats into an elaborate fantasy bubble, on the verge of convincing herself that her architect husband is spying on her. A faint tapping or an unfamiliar sound are enough to incite her paranoia while reality and imagination begin to blur.

== Cast ==
- Ellen Dorrit Petersen as Ingrid
- Henrik Rafaelsen as Morten
- Vera Vitali as Elin

== Reception ==
Blind received positive reviews upon its premiere at the 2014 Sundance Film Festival. Review aggregator Rotten Tomatoes reports a 92% positive score based on 37 reviews, with an average rating of 7.55/10. It also has a score of 83/100 on Metacritic based on 14 critics, indicating "universal acclaim".

Scott Foundas of Variety, said in his review that "ace Norwegian scribe Eskil Vogt makes a sparkling directorial debut with an alternately tragic and playful tale of a blind authoress". Boyd van Hoeij in his review for The Hollywood Reporter called the film "an ambitiously constructed screenplay translates into a film that's easier to admire than to love". William Bibbiani from CraveOnline praised the film by saying that "Blind exists as a nebulous construction, ever shifting but ultimately centered around a lovely and funny love-quadrangle with curious characters and consistent insight. The film's curious blend of the sensual and the cerebral manages to engage even when you begin to lack confidence about whether anything is actually happening at all".

== Accolades ==
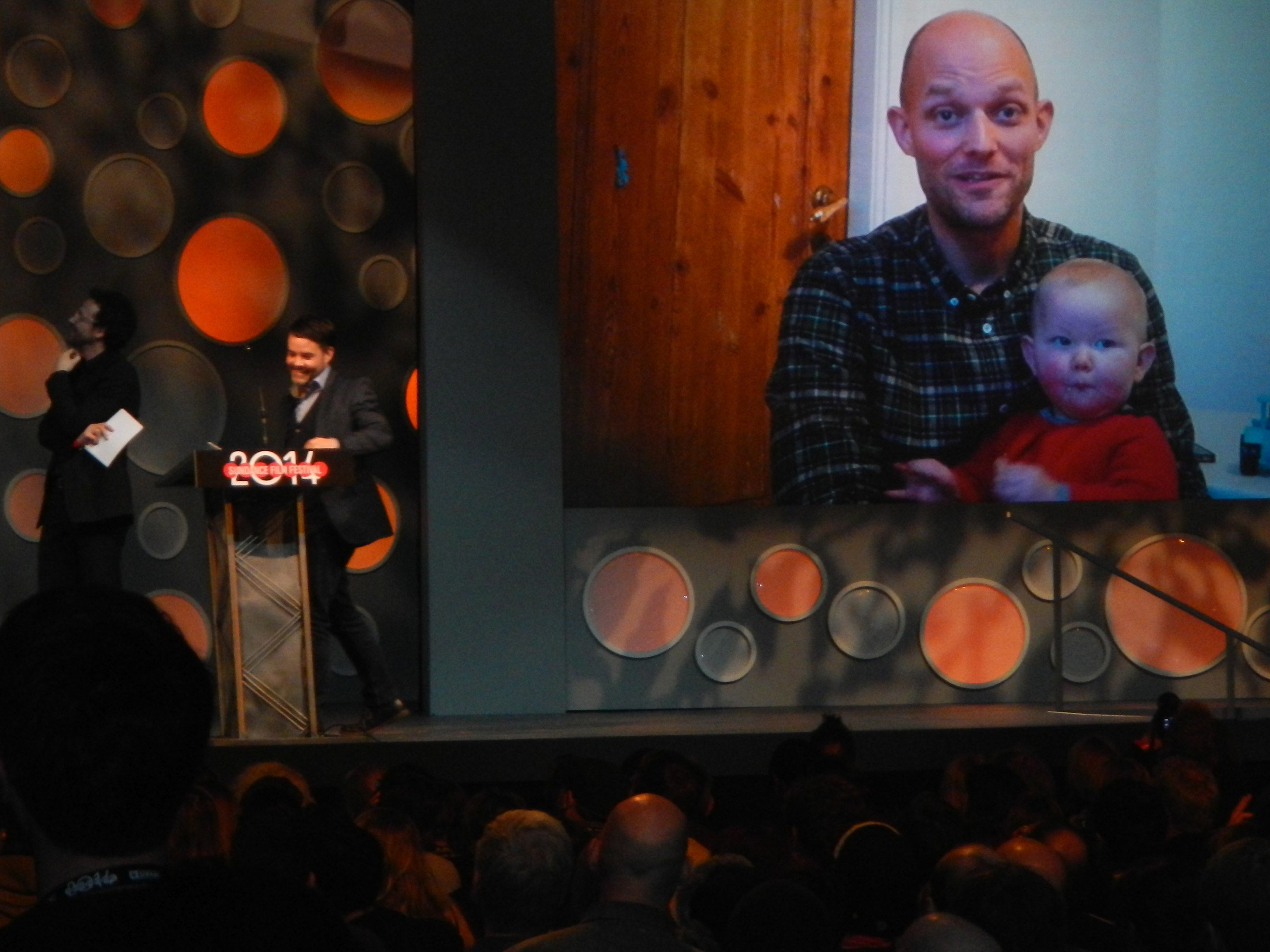
Blind won the Screenwriting Award at the 2014 Sundance Film Festival.

| Year | Award | Category | Recipient | Result |
|---|---|---|---|---|
| 2014 | Sundance Film Festival | World Cinema Grand Jury Prize: Dramatic | Eskil Vogt | Nominated |
| 2014 | Sundance Film Festival | Screenwriting Award: World Cinema Dramatic | Eskil Vogt | Won |
| 2014 | Berlin International Film Festival | Label Europa Cinemas | Eskil Vogt | Won |
