= The Man on Horseback =

1943 novel by Pierre Drieu La Rochelle

- Author: Pierre Drieu La Rochelle
- Original title: L'Homme à cheval
- Translator: Thomas M. Hines
- Language: French
- Publisher: Éditions Gallimard
- Publication date: 29 March 1943
- Publication place: France
- English publication date: 1978
- Pages: 243

The Man on Horseback (French: L'homme à cheval) is a 1943 novel by the French writer Pierre Drieu la Rochelle. It is set in Bolivia and tells the story of a dictator who tries to create an empire. The novel explores the author's ideas about political momentum and its origins. The allegorical narrative, complex plot and romantic verve make the novel stand out from Drieu's previous works, which are written in a realistic style and largely autobiographical.

== Publication ==
The first edition of The Man on Horseback was published in March 1943 and the second in July the same year. An English translation by Thomas M. Hines was published in 1978.

== Proposed film ==
In 1964 it was announced Harry Brown was writing a film version of the book to star Alain Delon and be directed by Sam Peckinpah. However no film resulted.

== See also ==
- Dictator novel
