= Hotel Acropolis =

1929 novel by Pierre Drieu La Rochelle

- Author: Pierre Drieu La Rochelle
- Original title: Une femme à sa fenêtre
- Translator: Patrick Kirwan
- Language: French
- Publisher: Éditions Gallimard
- Publication date: 1929
- Publication place: France
- English publication date: 1931
- Pages: 284

Hotel Acropolis is a 1929 novel by the French writer Pierre Drieu La Rochelle. The French title is Une femme à sa fenêtre, which means "a woman at her window". The narrative is set in Athens and revolves the love affair between the wife of a French diplomat and a young communist leader who is sought by the police for a terrorist attack he has committed.

Drieu was himself a communist at the time he wrote the novel, but the communist character is portrayed as a man who seeks adventure and action rather than a Marxist hero. This kind of character, the political adventure seeker, here appears for the first time in the author's oeuvre and would be used several times in his subsequent works.

The novel first appeared in the left-wing weekly La Voix in 1929 and was published as a book by Éditions Gallimard the same year. An English translation by Patrick Kirwan was published in 1931. The book was adapted into the 1976 film A Woman at Her Window directed by Pierre Granier-Deferre.
