= The Worst Person in the World =

2021 film by Joachim Trier

- Theatrical release poster
- Norwegian: Verdens verste menneske
- Directed by: Joachim Trier
- Written by: Eskil Vogt; Joachim Trier
- Produced by: Andrea Berentsen Ottmar; Thomas Robsahm
- Starring: Renate Reinsve; Anders Danielsen Lie; Herbert Nordrum
- Cinematography: Kasper Tuxen
- Edited by: Olivier Bugge Coutté
- Music by: Ola Fløttum
- Production companies: Oslo Pictures; MK Productions; Film i Väst; Snowglobe; B-Reel Films
- Distributed by: SF Studios (Norway); Memento Distribution (France); TriArt Film (Sweden); Camera Film (Denmark)
- Release dates: 8 July 2021 (Cannes); 13 October 2021 (France); 15 October 2021 (Norway); 19 November 2021 (Sweden); 16 June 2022 (Denmark)
- Running time: 128 minutes
- Countries: Norway; France; Denmark; Sweden
- Language: Norwegian
- Budget: €5 million ($5.6 million)
- Box office: $12.7 million

The Worst Person in the World (Norwegian: Verdens verste menneske) is a 2021 romantic comedy-drama film directed by Joachim Trier, who co-wrote the screenplay with Eskil Vogt. It is the third and final film in the director's Oslo trilogy, following Reprise (2006) and Oslo, August 31st (2011). The film premiered in competition at the 2021 Cannes Film Festival to widespread critical acclaim, with Renate Reinsve winning the award for Best Actress for her performance in the film. At the 94th Academy Awards, the film was nominated for Best International Feature Film and Best Original Screenplay.

== Plot ==
Julie, a medical student in Oslo, transitions from medicine to psychology and then photography, and begins working at a bookstore. In her late twenties, she begins a relationship with Aksel Willman, a comic artist fifteen years her senior. Now exploring writing, she spends a weekend with Aksel at his parents' house. Aksel suggests starting a family, but Julie is uncertain. While walking home from a publishing event for Aksel, Julie crashes a wedding reception and meets Eivind, a barista. Despite both being in relationships, they spend the night together sharing jokes and intimacies, but refrain from sexual relations. They exchange only their first names before parting ways.

Julie writes a short story about feminism and oral sex, impressing Aksel, who encourages her to post it online. It gains attention. She celebrates her thirtieth birthday at her divorced mother's home, but her father fails to attend, citing back pain. Days later, Julie's half-sister inadvertently reveals that their father was actually watching her play at a football tournament on Julie's birthday. He makes excuses to decline Aksel's invitation to visit them in Oslo. While working at a bookstore, Julie encounters Eivind and his girlfriend Sunniva. During dinner with Aksel's brother and sister-in-law, Aksel complains about the sanitized cinematic adaptation of his politically incorrect comic series Bobcat (Gaupe in Norwegian), leaving Julie feeling bored and ignored. The next morning she daydreams about spending the day with Eivind, imagining falling in love. That same day she ends her relationship with Aksel.

Eivind breaks up with the obsessively social justice– and climate-conscious Sunniva due to her restrictive lifestyle. Julie and Eivind move in together. At a small party Eivind hosts, one of his friends discovers Eivind's stash of psychedelic mushrooms, which Julie consumes, leading to hallucinations. The following night, Julie confides to Eivind that she feels comfortable being herself around him. Aksel's brother later runs into Julie at her workplace and reveals that Aksel has incurable pancreatic cancer. Sometime later, Eivind discovers a short story Julie wrote. Assuming it is autobiographical, he asks her about it, complimenting its writing. Still emotionally overwhelmed by the news about Aksel, she angrily denies it, patronizing him.

Julie discovers she is pregnant and hesitates to tell Eivind. She visits Aksel in the hospital, where he expresses fear of dying but still professes his love for her. Julie tells him about her pregnancy, and although Aksel insists she would be a good mother, she remains scared. Upon returning home, she informs Eivind of her pregnancy, acknowledging neither of them wanted children and stating she needs time to decide whether to keep the child. She spends more time with Aksel as his condition deteriorates, visiting places from his childhood and photographing him. He laments about wishing to return to their old life together. Later, she receives a voicemail from Aksel's brother, informing her that Aksel is unlikely to survive the night. Julie walks through the streets that night and watches the sun rise, becoming overwhelmed with emotion over Aksel's presumed death. While showering, she experiences a miscarriage.

Some time later, Julie works as an on-set photographer at a film shoot. She photographs an actress and later sees the actress outside with Eivind and a baby. Returning home, she begins editing the day's photos.

== Cast ==
- Renate Reinsve as Julie
- Anders Danielsen Lie as Aksel
- Herbert Nordrum as Eivind
- Hans Olav Brenner as Ole Magnus
- Helene Bjørneby as Karianne
- Vidar Sandem as Per Harald
- Maria Grazia Di Meo as Sunniva
- Lasse Gretland as Kristoffer
- Karen Røise Kielland as Tone
- Marianne Krogh as Eva
- Thea Stabell as Åse
- Deniz Kaya as Adil
- Eia Skjønsberg as Synne

== Production ==
The Worst Person in the World is directed by Norwegian director Joachim Trier, who was also responsible for co-writing the screenplay, along with Eskil Vogt.

The film is a co-production between Norway, France, Denmark, and Sweden. It was filmed on location in Oslo, Norway.

The title of the film comes from a Norwegian figure of speech that's commonly spoken in a self-deprecating way when people think they have made a mistake.

== Release and reception ==
mk2 Films acquired worldwide sales rights to the film in February 2021.

The film had its world premiere in competition for the Palme d'Or at the 2021 Cannes Film Festival on 7 July. A week later, the film's North American distribution rights were sold to Neon, while UK, Irish and Indian rights were acquired by Mubi.

The Worst Person in the World had its North American premiere on 11 September as a Gala Presentation at the 2021 Toronto International Film Festival. The film was released theatrically in France on 13 October 2021 by Memento Distribution, in Norway on 15 October 2021 by SF Studios, in Sweden on 19 November 2021 by TriArt Film and in Denmark on 16 June 2022 by Camera Film.

The Worst Person in the World became a part of The Criterion Collection with Blu-ray and DVD releases on 28 June 2022.

=== Critical response ===
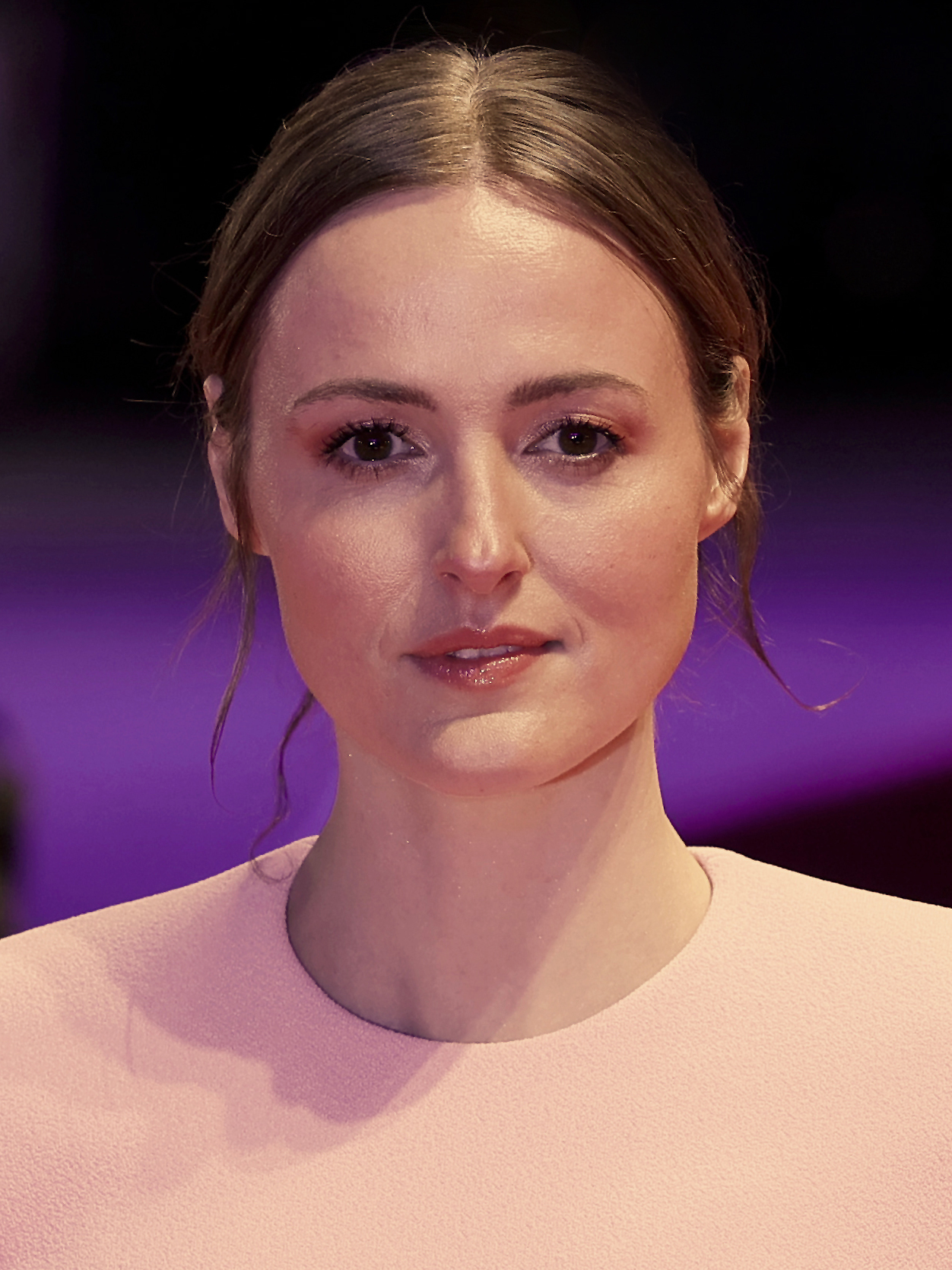
Renate Reinsve's performance received universal acclaim and won her the Cannes Film Festival Award for Best Actress and a earned her a BAFTA nomination.

On the review aggregator website Rotten Tomatoes, 96% of 251 critics' reviews are positive, with an average rating of 8.8/10. The website's consensus reads: "The Worst Person in the World concludes Joachim Trier's Oslo trilogy with a romantic comedy that delightfully subverts the genre's well-worn tropes." Metacritic, which uses a weighted average, assigned the film a score of 91 out of 100, based on 47 critics, indicating "universal acclaim". A review on newcityfilm.com called it "a drama in the fashion of a romantic comedy, with serious moments woven with an assured touch into heightened feeling and occasional subjective fantasy".

The Guardian's Peter Bradshaw described the film as "one of Cannes' best" and "an instant classic". Richard Lawson of Vanity Fair called it "exquisite, wistful (and downright sad)", praising the cast performances and Trier's writing. In a review for IndieWire, David Ehrlich gave the film a grade of B and commended Reinsve's performance, writing, "If Julie is less of a character than a vividly realized archetype, Reinsve didn't get the message." Richard Lawson of Vanity Fair and David Sims of The Atlantic declared The Worst Person in the World the best film of 2021.

Among the negative reviews, Deborah Ross wrote, "The 'messy young woman' trope has become, I think, rather overdone.... It's got to the point where a film about a woman who, say, sticks to a profession, fills in her tax return on time, has developed some certitudes about life might be the more interesting, more original option.... The two hours go by pleasantly enough but the bottom line is: I felt nothing and didn't care." Richard Brody concludes that the film "is a sham, except for its lead performance. Joachim Trier's drama about an intrepid and passionate young woman in Oslo reduces her to a handful of character traits. [...] Trier's film is set up like a deck of tarot cards, with each scene and event... corresponding clearly to a character trait and pushing a button of pre-programmed emotional response. Its narrowness of dramatic form reflects the narrowness with which it views its protagonist and the narrowness of the world view that it embodies....The movie offers no details about any conflict between domestic and artistic life...driven by a relentless focus on Julie's personal life, but it's a focus that remains obliviously impersonal."

The film was nominated for Best International Feature Film and Best Original Screenplay at the 94th Academy Awards.

In June 2025, The New York Times ranked The Worst Person in the World at number 95 on its list of "The 100 Best Movies of the 21st Century".

=== Accolades ===
Award	Date of ceremony	Category	Recipient(s)	Result	Ref.
Cannes Film Festival	17 July 2021	Palme d'Or	Joachim Trier	Nominated	
Cannes Film Festival	17 July 2021	Best Actress	Renate Reinsve	Won	
Gotham Independent Film Awards	29 November 2021	Best International Feature	The Worst Person in the World	Nominated	
National Board of Review	3 December 2021	Top Five Foreign Language Films	The Worst Person in the World	Won	
New York Film Critics Circle	3 December 2021	Best Foreign Language Film	The Worst Person in the World	Won	
Washington D.C. Area Film Critics Association Awards	6 December 2021	Best Foreign Language Film	The Worst Person in the World	Nominated	
European Film Awards	11 December 2021	Best Screenwriter	Joachim Trier	Nominated	
European Film Awards	11 December 2021	Best Actress	Renate Reinsve	Nominated	
Chicago Film Critics Association Awards	15 December 2021	Best Foreign Language Film	The Worst Person in the World	Nominated	
Los Angeles Film Critics Association Awards	18 December 2021	Best Actress	Renate Reinsve	Runner-up	
Dallas–Fort Worth Film Critics Association	20 December 2021	Best Foreign Language Film	The Worst Person in the World	Runner-up	
Alliance of Women Film Journalists Awards	January 2022	Best Breakthrough Performance	Renate Reinsve	Nominated	
Alliance of Women Film Journalists Awards	January 2022	Most Daring Performance	Renate Reinsve	Nominated	
National Society of Film Critics	8 January 2022	Best Actress	Renate Reinsve	Runner-up	
National Society of Film Critics	8 January 2022	Best Supporting Actor	Anders Danielsen Lie	Won	
Belgian Film Critics Association	8 January 2022	Grand Prix	The Worst Person in the World	Won	
San Diego Film Critics Society	10 January 2022	Best International Film	The Worst Person in the World	Nominated	
San Francisco Bay Area Film Critics Circle	10 January 2022	Best Foreign Language Film	The Worst Person in the World	Nominated	
Austin Film Critics Association	11 January 2022	Best International Film	The Worst Person in the World	Nominated	
Toronto Film Critics Association	16 January 2022	Best Foreign Language Film	The Worst Person in the World	Runner-up	
Seattle Film Critics Society	17 January 2022	Best Film Not in the English Language	The Worst Person in the World	Nominated	
Seattle Film Critics Society	17 January 2022	Best Actress in a Leading Role	Renate Reinsve	Nominated	
Houston Film Critics Society Awards	19 January 2022	Best Foreign Language Film	The Worst Person in the World	Nominated	
Online Film Critics Society Awards	24 January 2022	Best Picture	The Worst Person in the World	Nominated	
Online Film Critics Society Awards	24 January 2022	Best Actress	Renate Reinsve	Nominated	
Online Film Critics Society Awards	24 January 2022	Best Film Not in the English Language	The Worst Person in the World	Nominated	
London Film Critics Circle Awards	6 February 2022	Actress of the Year	Renate Reinsve	Nominated	
London Film Critics Circle Awards	6 February 2022	Foreign Language Film of the Year	The Worst Person in the World	Nominated	
César Awards	25 February 2022	Best Foreign Film	The Worst Person in the World	Nominated	
Critics' Choice Awards	13 March 2022	Best Foreign Language Film	The Worst Person in the World	Nominated	
British Academy Film Awards	13 March 2022	Best Actress in a Leading Role	Renate Reinsve	Nominated	
British Academy Film Awards	13 March 2022	Best Film Not in the English Language	The Worst Person in the World	Nominated	
Satellite Awards	2 April 2022	Best Foreign Language Film	The Worst Person in the World	Nominated	
Satellite Awards	2 April 2022	Best Actress in a Motion Picture – Comedy or Musical	Renate Reinsve	Nominated	
Academy Awards	27 March 2022	Best Original Screenplay	Eskil Vogt and Joachim Trier	Nominated	
Academy Awards	27 March 2022	Best International Feature Film	Norway	Nominated	
Amanda Award	20 August 2022	People's Amanda	The Worst Person in the World	Won	
Amanda Award	20 August 2022	Best Norwegian Film	The Worst Person in the World	Won	
Amanda Award	20 August 2022	Best Director (film)	Joachim Trier	Nominated	
Amanda Award	20 August 2022	Best Actress	Renate Reinsve	Won	
Amanda Award	20 August 2022	Best Supporting Actor	Anders Danielsen Lie	Won	
Amanda Award	20 August 2022	Best Supporting Actor	Herbert Nordrum	Nominated	
Amanda Award	20 August 2022	Best Screenplay	Eskil Vogt and Joachim Trier	Won	
Amanda Award	20 August 2022	Best Sound Design	Gisle Tveito	Nominated	
Amanda Award	20 August 2022	Best Original Soundtrack	Ola Fløttum	Won	
Amanda Award	20 August 2022	Best Editing	Olivier Bugge Coutté	Nominated	
Amanda Award	20 August 2022	Best Production Design	Roger Rosenberg	Nominated	
Amanda Award	20 August 2022	Best Visual Effect	Espen Syberg and Kai Kiønig Bortne	Nominated	
British Independent Film Awards	4 December 2022	Best International Independent Film	Joachim Trier, Eskil Vogt, Andrea Berentsen Ottmar, Thomas Robsahm	Won	
Gaudí Awards	22 January 2023	Best European Film	The Worst Person in the World	Nominated	
Goya Awards	11 February 2023	Best European Film	The Worst Person in the World	Won	

== See also ==
- List of submissions to the 94th Academy Awards for Best International Feature Film
- List of Norwegian submissions for the Academy Award for Best International Feature Film
- List of Nordic Academy Award winners and nominees
