= Reprise (film) =

- Theatrical release poster
- Directed by: Joachim Trier
- Written by: Eskil Vogt; Joachim Trier
- Produced by: Karin Julsrud
- Starring: Espen Klouman Høiner; Anders Danielsen Lie; Viktoria Winge; Odd-Magnus Williamson; Pål Stokka; Christian Rubeck; Henrik Elvestad
- Cinematography: Jakob Ihre
- Edited by: Olivier Bugge Coutté
- Music by: Ola Fløttum; Knut Schreiner
- Production companies: 4 1/2; Filmlance International AB; Nordisk Film Post Production; Norsk Filmstudio
- Distributed by: Nordisk Film Distribusjon
- Release dates: 3 July 2006 (KVIFF); 8 September 2006 (Norway)
- Running time: 105 minutes
- Country: Norway
- Language: Norwegian
- Box office: $1.3 million

Reprise is a 2006 Norwegian comedy-drama film directed by Joachim Trier and co-written, over the course of five years, by Trier and Eskil Vogt. It is Trier's first feature-length film and the first, along with Oslo, August 31st (2011) and The Worst Person in the World (2021), in the director's Oslo trilogy.

The film follows a friend group of people from Oslo as they navigate their early 20s, focusing particularly on Erik (Espen Klouman Høiner) and Phillip (Anders Danielsen Lie), who both harbour ambitions of being writers but whose lives take different paths.

It was the Norwegian submission for the Academy Award for Best International Feature Film at the 79th Academy Awards.

== Plot ==
Best friends and writers Erik and Phillip, both 23, fantasize that their novels will become cult hits. However, when they both submit manuscripts, Erik's is rejected. Phillip's, on the other hand, is immediately accepted and a year later he becomes a star of the Norwegian literary scene.

Six months later, Erik and his friends pick up Phillip at a psychiatric hospital after treatment following a suicide attempt. It is revealed that Phillip is suffering from psychosis which doctors believe was triggered by his whirlwind romance with Kari, a girl he met and fell in love with at an underground punk show. Still unpublished, Erik hasn't given up his dream, and continues to submit while Phillip shies away from all mention of writing. Phillip tries to reunite with Kari, who on the advice of his psychiatrists hasn't seen Phillip in seven months.

Erik's revised novel finally is accepted by a publisher. He struggles to assert himself during the editing process and wonders whether he should stay with his girlfriend, Lilian, who he fears is holding him back from success. His publisher invites him to a book launch where Erik learns that Sten Egil Dahl, a reclusive writer he and Phillip both admire deeply, will be in attendance. Erik invites Phillip to the launch but Phillip is quickly overwhelmed and leaves early. Meanwhile Erik's attempt to meet Dahl is botched by another writer.

Still unable to write, Phillip invites Kari to Paris to try to recreate their first trip together. While there he obsessively has Kari re-enact the events of their first trip, ignoring her discomfort. He eventually admits that he no longer is sure he loves her.

Erik's book is published but the publicity tour goes badly. He is met with poor reviews, and Lillian dumps him for his selfishness.

After a night out with Erik, Phillip is inspired to write and immediately asks Erik for his thoughts. Erik is honest and tells Phillip it isn't his best work but has potential. Phillip is crushed and criticizes himself as a hack who recycles the work of Dahl and Ulven. After Phillip implies he thinks the same of Erik's novel, Erik storms out. At a park, he is knocked over by Dahl's dog and awakens in Dahl's home. To his surprise, Dahl not only knows who he is but has also read his work, which he offers measured praise. This renews Erik's self-confidence and he begins to contemplate leaving Oslo to concentrate on his writing.

Phillip goes to Kari's telemarketing job and tells her that he loves her. When Kari rejects him he collapses on the floor and is then taken back to a psychiatric hospital. Erik goes to visit but cannot bring himself to meet with him and instead leaves.

Erik imagines a future in which he abruptly leaves for Paris, writing a book that creates mixed reviews but draws comparisons with Dahl's work. However his success is upstaged by the surprising literary success of another friend in his social circle, the boorish Henning. In Erik's fantasy, he returns to Oslo for a friend's wedding. He runs into Phillip, who is happy and back with Kari, now back in school studying psychology.

The day after the wedding, Erik and Phillip meet at a café and discuss Dahl's abrupt suicide for unknown reasons. Phillip compliments Erik on his latest novel, which encourages Erik to keep going forward with his third book. Erik asks Phillip if he is still writing, and he admits he is unlikely to write again unless inspiration abruptly strikes. Erik imagines a happy Phillip and Kari sitting at the café, playfully teasing each other.

== Cast ==
- Anders Danielsen Lie as Phillip
- Espen Klouman Høiner as Erik
- Viktoria Winge as Kari
- Odd-Magnus Williamson as Morten
- Pål Stokka as Geir
- Christian Rubeck as Lars
- Henrik Elvestad as Henning
- Henrik Mestad as Jan Eivind
- Rebekka Karijord as Johanne
- Sigmund Sæverud as Sten Egil Dahl
- Tone Danielsen as Inger
- Elisabeth Sand as Hanne
- Thorbjørn Harr as Mathis Wergeland
- Silje Hagen as Lillian
- Anne Sandvik Lindmo as host
- Andreas Tylden as Rune

== Reception ==
=== Box office ===
The film grossed approximately $1,297,260 worldwide: $514,013 in the United States and Canada, and $647,579 in other territories—including $491,785 in Norway.

=== Critical response ===
Reprise received generally positive reviews from Western critics. As of August 23, 2008, the review aggregator Rotten Tomatoes reported that 88% of critics gave the film positive reviews, based on 82 reviews, and an average rating of 7.4/10. The website's critical consensus states: "With Reprise, first-time director Joachim Trier effectively captures the spirit of young adulthood, and announces his arrival as a filmmaker to be watched". Metacritic reported the film had an average score of 79 out of 100, based on 25 critics, indicating "generally favorable reviews".

The film appeared on several critics' lists of the ten best films of 2008:

- 5th - Elizabeth Weitzman, New York Daily News
- 6th - Nathan Rabin, The A.V. Club
- 8th - Keith Phipps, The A.V. Club
- 10th - Andrew O'Hehir, Salon

In November 2009, film critics at the Norwegian newspaper Verdens Gang named Reprise the best Norwegian film of the decade.

=== Accolades ===
- Istanbul International Film Festival
  - The Golden Tulip: Best Film
- Lecce European Film Festival
  - The Golden Olive: Best Film
  - Best Script
- 41st Karlovy Vary International Film Festival
  - Best Director
  - Don Quijote Prize
- Nordic Film Festival in Rouen
  - Best Film
  - Audience Award
- Toronto International Film Festival
  - Discovery Award
- Amanda Award
  - Best Film
  - Best Direction
  - Best Script

Reprise was shown outside of competition at the 2007 Sundance Film Festival.
