= The Fire Within =

1963 French tragedy film by Louis Malle

- French theatrical release poster
- French: Le Feu follet
- Directed by: Louis Malle
- Screenplay by: Louis Malle
- Based on: Will O' the Wisp by Pierre Drieu La Rochelle
- Produced by: Alain Quefféléan
- Starring: Maurice Ronet
- Cinematography: Ghislain Cloquet
- Edited by: Suzanne Baron; Monique Nana
- Music by: Erik Satie
- Production companies: Nouvelles Éditions de Films; Arco Film
- Distributed by: Lux Compagnie Cinématographique de France (France); Ci. Ti. Cinematografica (Italy)
- Release dates: 2 September 1963 (Venice); 15 October 1963 (France); 2 November 1963 (Italy)
- Running time: 108 minutes
- Countries: France; Italy
- Language: French

The Fire Within (French: Le Feu follet, lit. 'will-o'-the-wisp', pronounced [lə fø fɔlɛ]) is a 1963 French tragedy film written and directed by Louis Malle. It is based on the 1931 novel Will O' the Wisp by Pierre Drieu La Rochelle, which was inspired by the life of poet Jacques Rigaut. The film stars Maurice Ronet and features Léna Skerla, Jean-Paul Moulinot, Bernard Tiphaine, Bernard Noël, Jeanne Moreau (who had previously worked with Ronet and Malle in Elevator to the Gallows), Jacques Sereys, and Alexandra Stewart in supporting roles. The score consists of music composed by Erik Satie and performed by pianist Claude Helffer.

The film won the Grand Jury Prize at the 24th Venice International Film Festival.

== Plot ==
Alain Leroy has been living and receiving treatment for his alcoholism at Dr. La Barbinais' rehabilitation clinic in Versailles for the past four months. He is separated from his American wife, Dorothy, who is in New York, where he also lived while they were together, and spends his first night away from the clinic to have a tryst with Lydia, one of Dorothy's friends, who is in France for a visit. Lydia tells Alain he is cured and should come back to New York with her, but he does not want to, and, though he says it is "serious", she cannot stay with him due to work obligations, so they part ways.

At the clinic, Alain spends most of his time alone in his room—reading, playing with knickknacks, trying to write, looking out the window, and examining his handgun. Dr. La Barbinais is happy to hear that Alain spent time with a woman and did not drink, and, telling Alain he has been cured for some time, suggests he think about moving out and getting on with his life. When Alain says he will drink again if he leaves the clinic, the doctor tells him that fear will fade with time and encourages him to try to reconcile with Dorothy again. Alain says he will be gone by the end of the week, and, before going to sleep that night, pledges to kill himself the next day.

In the morning, Alain hitches a ride to Paris and cashes a check Lydia gave him, supposedly to repay an old gambling debt. Then, he contacts some old friends and spends the rest of the day having a series of reunions. Dubourg, Alain's former drinking buddy, has settled into a comfortable life with his wife Fanny and her two young daughters, and is writing a book about ancient Egypt. He tries to impress upon Alain the virtues of his predictable, adult existence and invites Alain to move in with him, but Alain, saying he does not want to grow old, refuses.

Next, Alain sees Eva. They talk about how all of their friends have changed, but Alain is disgusted by the detachment of her new drug-using friends and leaves. He meets the Minville brothers, who, though the Algerian War is over, are still fighting against Algerian independence, at the Café Flore. After they leave, he drinks an alcoholic beverage left on the table. He soon begins to feel sick, so he goes to Cyrille and Solange Lavauds' house early to take a nap before the party to which they invited him.

A fancy dinner is underway when Alain wakes up. His friends are welcoming and glad to see him, but an intellectual named Brancion is not impressed by a story Cyrille tells about one of Alain's drunken escapades. Cyrille gives Alain another drink, and Alain ends up ranting about how he is incapable of wanting or desiring anything, even Solange, his beautiful former lover. In front of Cyrill, Alain asks Solange to save him, but she gently rebuffs him. He heads for the door, promising a concerned Cyrill he will be back, and Cyrill invites him to lunch the next day.

Michel "Milou" Bostel, a young man currently living a life of drinking and partying similar to the one Alain used to live, leaves the Lavauds' party at the same time as Alain. They ride the bus together and walk around Paris at night, and Alain confesses that he feels his reputation as a ladies' man is undeserved, as he was never able to hold on to a woman, and he has always wanted to love and be loved.

Waking up back in his room at the clinic, Alain packs up his belongings. Solange calls to remind him to come over for lunch, and he promises he will be there. She tries to share some kind words, but he says he does not understand and hangs up. After finishing reading The Great Gatsby, Alain shoots himself in the heart.

== Cast ==
- Maurice Ronet as Alain Leroy
- Léna Skerla as Lydia, a friend of Alain's wife, Dorothy
- Yvonne Clech as Ms. Farnoux, a patient at Dr. La Barbinais' clinic
- Hubert Deschamps as D'Averseau, a patient at Dr. La Barbinais' clinic
- Jean-Paul Moulinot as Dr. La Barbinais
- Mona Dol as Mrs. La Barbinais
- Pierre Moncorbier as Moraine, a patient at Dr. La Barbinais' clinic
- René Dupuy (credited as René Dupuis) as Charlie, the bartender at the Hotel du Quai Voltaire
- Bernard Tiphaine as Michel "Milou" Bostel, who Alain sees at the bar and the Lavauds' party
- Bernard Noël as Dubourg, Alain's friend who has settled down
- Ursula Kubler as Fanny, Dubourg's wife
- Jeanne Moreau as Eva, Alain's friend who is an artist
- Alain Mottet as Urcel, Eva's friend, who is a drug-addicted poet
- François Gragnon as François Minville, Alain's friend who is in the OAS and fresh out of jail
- Romain Bouteille as Jérôme Minville, Alain's friend who is in the OAS and fresh out of jail
- Jacques Sereys as Cyrille Lavaud, Alain's friend who is rich
- Alexandra Stewart as Solange, Alain's ex-girlfriend and Cyrille's wife
- Claude Deschamps as Maria, Alain's friend, who is at the Lavauds' party
- Tony Taffin as Marc Brancion, a guest at the Lavauds' party
- Henri Serre as Frédéric, Maria's married boyfriend
- Vera Valdez as the young female patient at Dr. La Barbinais' clinic (uncredited)
- Darling Légitimus as Chantal, the Dubourgs' maid (uncredited)
- Michèle Mahaut as a guest at the Lavauds' party (uncredited)

== Reception ==
The film was the official French submission for the Academy Award for Best Foreign Language Film at the 36th Academy Awards, but it was not chosen as one of the final five nominees in the category.

The Fire Within has an approval rating of 82% on review aggregator website Rotten Tomatoes, based on 11 reviews, and an average rating of 7.7/10. In his 2006 Movie Guide, Leonard Maltin gave the film 3.5 stars (out of four), calling it "probably Malle's best early film." Roger Ebert gave the film the same rating, describing it as a "triumph of style."

=== Influence ===
Malle has been an influence of American director Wes Anderson, with Anderson's The Royal Tenenbaums (2001) being particularly influenced by The Fire Within. Tenenbaums even features a character saying the line "I'm going to kill myself tomorrow", which is the English translation of a line from Malle's film.

The film also inspired Joachim Trier's Oslo, August 31st.

== See also ==
- List of submissions to the 36th Academy Awards for Best Foreign Language Film
- List of French submissions for the Academy Award for Best Foreign Language Film
