= Sick of Myself (film) =

2022 film by Kristoffer Borgli

- Theatrical release poster
- Norwegian: Syk pike
- Directed by: Kristoffer Borgli
- Written by: Kristoffer Borgli
- Produced by: Andrea Berentsen Ottmar; Dyveke Bjørkly Graver
- Starring: Kristine Kujath Thorp; Eirik Sæther; Fanny Vaager; Henrik Mestad; Andrea Bræin Hovig; Steinar Klouman Hallert; Fredrik Stenberg Ditlev-Simonsen; Sarah Francesca Brænne; Anders Danielsen Lie
- Cinematography: Benjamin Loeb
- Edited by: Kristoffer Borgli
- Music by: Turns
- Production companies: Oslo Pictures; Garagefilm International; Film i Väst
- Distributed by: Scandinavian Film Distribution (Norway)
- Release dates: 22 May 2022 (Cannes); 9 September 2022 (Norway)
- Running time: 97 minutes
- Countries: Norway; Sweden
- Language: Norwegian
- Box office: $1.1 million

Sick of Myself (Norwegian: Syk pike, lit. 'Sick girl') is a 2022 absurdist black comedy film written and directed by Kristoffer Borgli. It stars Kristine Kujath Thorp, Eirik Sæther, Fanny Vaager, Henrik Mestad, Andrea Bræin Hovig, Steinar Klouman Hallert, Fredrik Stenberg Ditlev-Simonsen, Sarah Francesca Brænne and Anders Danielsen Lie.

The film had its world premiere at the Un Certain Regard section of the 2022 Cannes Film Festival on 22 May. It was theatrically released in Norway on 9 September by Scandinavian Film Distribution.

== Plot ==
Signe and Thomas are a couple living together in Oslo, where Signe works as a barista while Thomas is an artist who specializes in “sculptures” made out of stolen furniture. Signe is jealous of the increased attention that Thomas has been receiving, and attempts to plot ways to divert it from him, including attempting to get a dog to attack her after witnessing a similar situation at her workplace. When Thomas lands a major exhibition of his work, Signe upstages his speech at a dinner celebrating its opening by faking a severe allergic reaction.

Signe comes across a news article about a Russian anti-anxiety medication called Lidexol, which has been recalled after reports that it has induced severe skin disease in those who have taken it. After purchasing a large quantity of it from Stian, her drug dealer friend, she begins to take it regularly. When symptoms of skin disease begin to present themselves, Signe visits a doctor under Thomas' encouragement, but refuses to allow him to perform any checks. That same day, Thomas is interviewed by a major magazine, leaving him unable to collect Signe from the hospital. Feeling Thomas is not showing her enough attention, Signe deliberately overdoses on Lidexol and is hospitalised, with Thomas spending more time caring for her as a result.

Under the recommendation of her mother, Signe begins attending a holistic support group for those with severe illnesses, but is admonished by a group member who believes she is lying. She lands an interview for a major news outlet under the pretence of raising awareness for her condition, but upon publication online, the resulting article is quickly overshadowed by news of a mass shooting. However, the next day, the article is published on the front page of the national newspaper, and leads to Signe signing a modelling contract. She continues to take Lidexol during this time, as a result of which her physical condition deteriorates further.

Signe is invited to shoot a commercial in a museum for a fashion brand called Regardless, alongside a model suffering from symbrachydactyly. On the day of the shoot, Thomas is arrested in a furniture store after an employee recognises him from the front page of the magazine that interviewed him, which describes him as "Thomas the Thief". At the shoot, Signe locks the other model in the bathroom before suddenly collapsing while she is being filmed. Signe reveals to her journalist friend Marte that she has been lying about her ordeal, and Thomas is jailed for his thefts. Signe returns to the support group for solace, once again fabricating her symptoms.

== Cast ==
- Kristine Kujath Thorp as Signe
- Eirik Sæther as Thomas
- Fanny Vaager as Marte
- Fredrik Stenberg Ditlev-Simonsen as Yngve
- Sarah Francesca Brænne as Emma
- Ingrid Vollan as Beate
- Steinar Klouman Hallert as Stian
- Andrea Bræin Hovig as Lisa
- Henrik Mestad as Espen
- Anders Danielsen Lie as a doctor

== Production ==
Borgli began conceiving the film in 2017. Despite Sick of Myself eventually being green-lit in Norway, the director said that living in Los Angeles while writing the script is what most heavily influenced the film's characters and plot: "The influence from the environment around me here really did something to the story and to the character. The personal traits of her being hugely ambitious, opportunistic and maybe even a little bit of a narcissist were things I bumped into more frequently here than I did in Norway."

== Release ==
Sick of Myself premiered at the Cannes Film Festival on 22 May 2022. It was released theatrically in Norway on 9 September 2022 by Scandinavian Film Distribution. In the United States, Utopia released the film in New York City on 12 April 2023 and in Los Angeles on 14 April.

== Reception ==
On the review aggregator website Rotten Tomatoes, the film holds an approval rating of 88% based on 68 reviews, with an average rating of 7.2/10. The website's critics consensus reads, "With an ample dose of dark humor, Sick of Myself is intent on turning stomachs with its vicious satire on vanity in the time of social media, delivering a one-upping saga of egos gone awry." Metacritic, which uses a weighted average, assigned the film a score of 72 out of 100, based on 11 critics, indicating "generally favorable reviews".

Bianca O'Neill of Time Out rated the film 5 stars out of 5, writing that "a perfectly executed black comedy accompanied by humorously vicious counter-culture commentary that cannot be overlooked." Cédric Succivalli of the International Cinephile Society rated the film 4 stars out of 5 and wrote, "Anchored by an exceptionally strong performance, and told in the stark and confrontational style that we have grown to expect from Scandinavian cinema, the film is a masterful achievement in socially-charged storytelling."

Angie Hans of The Hollywood Reporter wrote that "the sly pleasure of Sick of Myself is that Signe's narcissism differs from the rest of ours more in degree than kind. Her impulses are as uproarious as they are repulsive not because they're so hard to understand, but because on some level, we can understand them all too well." Amber Wilkinson of Screen Daily wrote that "The only problem with taking things to extremes is that it can lead to there being nowhere left to go but, if Sick of Myself runs out of narrative road towards the end, there's still a decent quotient of dark humour along the way."

Ella Kemp of IndieWire gave the film a rating of "B−". Hannah Strong of Little White Lies wrote that the film "appears so one-note there's never any threat of deeper meaner or commentary on societal beauty standards and the voracious appetites of social media influencers."

Damon Wise of Deadline Hollywood wrote, "There are two very intriguing stories going on here; one is an irreverent skit on society, the media, and the celebrity of victimhood, the other is a tender portrait of a sad, lonely woman who'll do anything to feel seen. But there's a yawning gap in the middle — and it's the sense of what's missing here that lingers, not what's there."

Beatrice Loayza of The New York Times called it a "queasy satire" and a "perverse tragedy of folly", saying: "Putting aside the film's obnoxious social critique (a seriously unfunny gag involving a blind assistant comes to mind), there is something compelling about its particular brand of cynicism."
