= Kristoffer Borgli =

Norwegian filmmaker (born 1985)

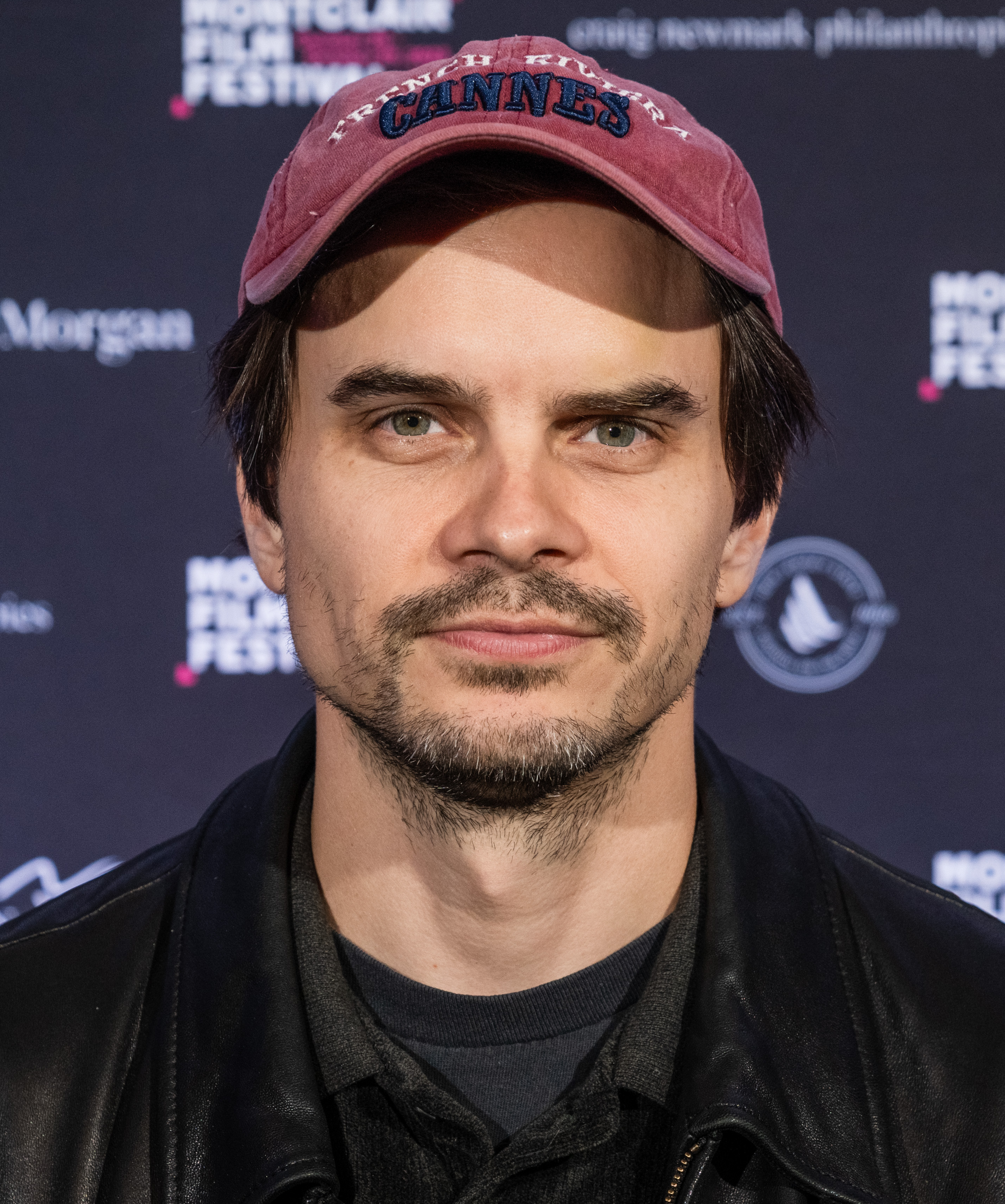
- Borgli in 2023
- Born: 1985 (age 40–41); Oslo, Norway
- Occupations: Film director; Screenwriter; Producer; Editor
- Years active: 2011–present
- Notable work: Sick of Myself (2022); Dream Scenario (2023); The Drama (2026)

Kristoffer Borgli (born 1985) is a Norwegian film director, screenwriter, producer and editor. He wrote and directed the films Sick of Myself (2022), Dream Scenario (2023), and The Drama (2026).

== Early life ==
Borgli was born in 1985 in Oslo, Norway. He grew up in a small suburb outside of Oslo, where skateboarding and making videos dominated his youth. At the age of 16, he worked at a video store for about three or four years, which sparked his interest in cinema and inspired him to pursue filmmaking.

== Career ==
Borgli's first feature film was 2017's DRIB, "a real documentary based on a fake energy drink". His second feature film, 2022's Sick of Myself, is a story about a relationship, contemporary art, and alternate identity/personality creation. The film received a limited theatrical release, grossing approximately $1.1 million worldwide – about $106,000 from the United States and Canada, and roughly $997,000 internationally.

In addition to his feature films, Borgli has directed several notable short films. His 2018 short film A Place We Call Reality received the Norwegian Film Critic Association award for Best Short of the Year. Another short film, Former Cult Member Hears Music For The First Time (2020), was an official selection at the Sundance Film Festival.

His 2023 film Dream Scenario about an ordinary college professor who suddenly achieves viral fame after appearing in millions of people's dreams received widespread critical praise and Oscar-buzz for its lead actor Nicolas Cage. He was not nominated. In 2024, it was announced that Borgli would direct and executive produce a series adaptation of The Shards by Bret Easton Ellis for HBO. He ended up leaving the project, with Ryan Murphy taking it over in 2025. His most recent film, The Drama, produced by A24 and starring Zendaya and Robert Pattinson in the lead roles was released in April 2026.

As of April 2026, Borgli is also developing a new feature film titled The Damage, which is based on the book The Damage by Harper Ellison.

On November 13th, 2026, it was annouced that Margot Robbie would be starring in Borgli's next film, The Week of Pain.

== Personal life ==
Allegedly, he wrote an article for the Norwegian magazine D2, where he described a relationship with a high school girl "ten years younger than me."

== Filmography ==
Short film

Year	Title	Director	Writer	Producer	Editor
2011	Molo	Yes	Yes	No	No
2011	Syndromes	Yes	No	No	No
2013	Whateverest	Yes	Yes	Yes	No
2014	Internet Famous	Yes	Yes	Yes	No
2018	A Place We Call Reality	Yes	Yes	No	Yes
2019	Loser	Yes	Yes	No	Yes
2019	It's Not a Phase	Yes	Yes	No	Yes
2020	Former Cult Member Hears Music for the First Time	Yes	Yes	No	Yes
2020	Softcore	Yes	Yes	No	No
2020	The Altruist	Yes	Yes	No	Yes
2021	Eer	Yes	Yes	No	No

Feature film

Year	Title	Director	Writer	Executive Producer	Editor
2017	DRIB	Yes	Yes	No	No
2022	Sick of Myself	Yes	Yes	No	Yes
2023	Dream Scenario	Yes	Yes	No	Yes
2026	The Drama	Yes	Yes	Yes	Yes
