= Rêveuse bourgeoisie =

1937 novel by Pierre Drieu La Rochelle

- Title page for Rêveuse bourgeoisie (1937)
- Author: Pierre Drieu La Rochelle
- Language: French
- Publisher: Éditions Gallimard
- Publication date: 1937
- Publication place: France
- Pages: 327

Rêveuse bourgeoisie ("Dreamy bourgeoisie") is a 1937 novel by the French writer Pierre Drieu La Rochelle. It tells the story of a declining middle-class family before and after World War I, told in five parts which span over three generations. The developments of the family, which was based on the author's own family, are paralleled to the overall decline of the French middle class around the same time. The novel was written at a time when Drieu La Rochelle was becoming increasingly more engaged in politics, but its themes and narrative are unpolitical and self-critical.

A first part of the novel was published in 1936 in the November issue of Nouvelle Revue Française. The finished book was published the year after by éditions Gallimard. Critics initially greeted it as the author's masterpiece, with some reservations about the change of pace toward the end of the novel.
