= How I Became Stupid =

2000 novel by Martin Page

- Author: Martin Page
- Original title: Comment je suis devenu stupide
- Language: French
- Publisher: Le Dilettante
- Publication date: 2000
- Publication place: France
- English publication date: 2004
- Pages: 224
- ISBN: 2-84263-040-8
- OCLC: 319909275

How I Became Stupid (originally Comment je suis devenu stupide) is a philosophical novel by French author Martin Page. It was published by Le Dilettante in 2000. The book won the Euroregional schools’ literature prize, an award given by Belgian, Dutch and German students.

The book has been translated into 24 languages.

== Synopsis ==
A twenty-five-year-old Aramaic scholar, Antoine has had it with being brilliant and deeply self-aware in today's culture. So tortured is he by the depth of his perception and understanding of himself and the world around him that he vows to denounce his intelligence by any means necessary in order to become stupid enough to be a happy, functioning member of society. What follows is a dark and hilarious odyssey as Antoine tries everything from alcoholism to stock-trading in order to lighten the burden of his brain on his soul.

== Adaptations ==
- Comment je suis devenu stupide (2004), comic by Nicolas Witko
