= Aber Bergen =

Norwegian television series

- Genre: Drama
- Directed by: Ole Endresen; Kjersti Steinsbø; Jadranko Mehic
- Starring: Ellen Dorrit Petersen; Odd-Magnus Williamson; Line Verndal; Lykke Kristine Moen; Siv Torin Knudsen Petersen; Torgny Gerhard Aanderaa
- Composer: Elliot Houwing Endresen
- Country of origin: Norway
- Original language: Norwegian
- No. of seasons: 3
- No. of episodes: 30

Production
- Executive producer: Eldar Nakken
- Running time: ca. 50 minutes
- Production company: ITV Studios Norway
- Budget: NOK20,000,000

Original release
- Release: 22 September 2016 – 2018

Aber Bergen is a Norwegian television series first broadcast on 22 September 2016 on TV3.

Ellen Dorrit Petersen was awarded the prize for best actress at the 2017 Gullruten ("Golden Screen") awards, while the series was nominated in the categories Best TV Drama and Best Audio/Scene/Production Design (Carly Reddin). It was nominated for four awards in the Gullruten 2018: Best Drama Series, Best Actress (Ellen Dorrit Petersen), Best Actor (Odd-Magnus Williamson), and Best Photography in TV Drama (Tore Vollan).

== Synopsis ==
The series follows the newly divorced Erik Aber and Elea Bergen, partners in the law firm Aber Bergen. The two defense lawyers engage in numerous challenging court cases as they attempt to balance their professional and private lives.

== Cast and characters ==
- Ellen Dorrit Petersen as Elea Bergen Vessel
- Odd-Magnus Williamson as Erik Aber
- Line Verndal as Diana Drange
- Lykke Kristine Moen as Unn Frøynes
- Siv Torin Knudsen Petersen as Trine-Lise
- Torgny Gerhard Aanderaa as Magnus Braseth
