= Martin Page (French author) =

French writer (born 1975)

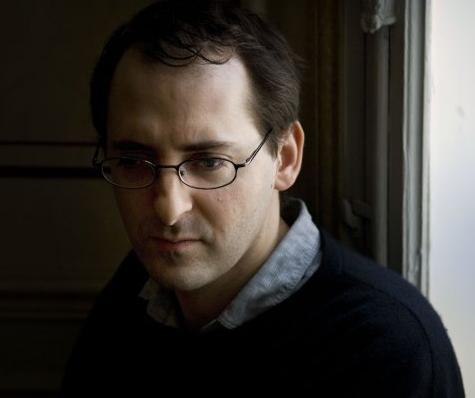
- Born: 1975 (age 50–51)
- Occupation: Writer
- Years active: 2000–present

Martin Page (born 1975) is a French writer.

He is the author of the bestselling novel, How I Became Stupid (2000), which won the Euroregional schools’ literature prize, an award given by Belgian, Dutch and German students.

== Bibliography ==
=== Novels ===
- How I Became Stupid (Comment je suis devenu stupide) (2000), ISBN 9782842630409
- Une parfaite journée parfaite (2002), ISBN 9782748107760
- La libellule de ses huit ans (2003), ISBN 9782842630683
- On s'habitue aux fins du monde (2005), ISBN 9782842631123
- The Discreet Pleasures of Rejection (Peut-être une histoire d'amour) (2008), ISBN 9782879296173
- La disparition de Paris et sa renaissance en Afrique (2010), ISBN 9782879297033
- La mauvaise habitude d'être soi (2010), illustrated by Quentin Faucompré, ISBN 9782757828830
- La nuit a dévoré le monde (2012), with pseudonym Pit Agarmen, ISBN 9782221132869
- L'apiculture selon Samuel Beckett (2013), ISBN 978-2823600070
- Je suis un dragon (2015), with pseudonym Pit Agarmen, ISBN 9782221145395
- L'art de revenir à la vie (2016), ISBN 9782021174960

=== Young adult novels ===
Flora et Max series, with Coline Pierré:

1. La folle rencontre de Flora et Max (2015), ISBN 9782211223942
2. Les nouvelles vies de Flora et Max (2018), ISBN 9782211239035

Stand-alones:

- Traité sur les miroirs pour faire apparaitre les dragons (2009), ISBN 9782211094641
- Le club des inadaptés (2010), ISBN 9782211201575
- Plus tard, je serai moi (2012), ISBN 9782812604911

=== Children's novels ===
- Le garçon de toutes les couleurs (2007), ISBN 9782211085373
- Je suis un tremblement de terre (2009), ISBN 9782211094559
- Conversation avec un gâteau au chocolat (2009), illustrated by Aude Picault, ISBN 9782211091770
- Le zoo des légumes (2013), illustrated by Sandrine Bonini, ISBN 9782211213219
- La première fois que j'ai (un peu) changé le monde (2018), ISBN 9782809661064

=== Young adult short stories ===
- "L'invention d'un secret" (2007), collected in Juke-box (ISBN 9782211086158)

=== Children's books ===
Picture books:

- La bataille contre mon lit (2011), illustrated by Sandrine Bonini, ISBN 9782360800230
- La recette des parents (2016), illustrated by Quentin Faucompré, ISBN 9782812611339
- Le permis d'être un enfant (2019), illustrated by Ronan Badel, ISBN 9782075097994

=== Comics ===
- Le banc de touche (2012), with Clément C. Fabre, ISBN 9782365350051
- Tu vas rater ta vie et personne ne t'aimera jamais (2012), ISBN 9791090425354
- 16 ways to get a boner (2013)
- If diseases were desserts (2013)

=== Poems ===
- 24 putain de poèmes de Noël (2021), collection of 24 poems
- Un accident entre le monde et moi (2022), collection of poems, ISBN 978-2362294303

=== Non-fiction ===
Essays:

- De la pluie (2007), ISBN 9782841148516
- Manuel d'écriture et de survie (2014), ISBN 9782021174885
- La charité des pauvres à l'égard des riches (2015), illustrated by Quentin Faucompré, ISBN 9791095668015
- Les animaux ne sont pas comestibles (2017), ISBN 978-2221193389
- Au-delà de la pénétration (2020), ISBN 9782371000926

Self help:

- N'essayez pas de changer : le monde restera toujours votre ennemi (2018), illustrated by Coline Pierré, ISBN 9782956536123

Epistolary:

- Nous avons des armes et nous ne savons pas nous en servir (2011), with Jakuta Alikavazovic, ISBN 9782913192980

== Adaptations ==
- Comment je suis devenu stupide (2004), comic by Nicolas Witko, based on novel How I Became Stupid
- Maybe a Love Story (2018), film directed by Rodrigo Bernardo, based on novel The Discreet Pleasures of Rejection
- The Night Eats the World (2018), film directed by Dominique Rocher, based on novel La nuit a dévoré le monde
- Le club des inadapté.e.s (2021), comic by Cati Baur, based on novel Le club des inadaptés

== Sources ==
- http://www.powells.com/cgi-bin/biblio?isbn=9780142004951&atch=h&atchi=158346812
- http://www.tower.com/details/details.cfm?wapi=100555497
