= The Comedy of Charleroi =

1934 short story collection by Pierre Drieu La Rochelle

- Author: Pierre Drieu La Rochelle
- Original title: La Comédie de Charleroi
- Translator: Douglas Gallagher
- Language: French
- Publisher: Éditions Gallimard
- Publication date: 1934
- Publication place: France
- English publication date: 1973
- Pages: 251

The Comedy of Charleroi (French: La comédie de Charleroi) is a 1934 short story collection by the French writer Pierre Drieu La Rochelle. It consists of six loosely connected stories based on Drieu La Rochelle's experiences as a soldier during World War I. An English translation by Douglas Gallagher was published in 1973.

== Plot ==
So began the battle of Charleroi, Belgium, August 21, 1914, in the first month of the (not so) Great War. Pierre Drieu La Rochelle, a 21-year-old French officer, was at first exhilarated, a fighting man at last, and then chastened by a shrapnel wound. Returning to the lines weeks later he was wounded again. After recovering from that he and other French soldiers joined the British in the Dardanelles, from which he was evacuated with amoebic dysentery. Recovered from that he joined a regiment at the Battle of Verdun to be so seriously wounded he was removed from active service.

== Contents ==
- "The Comedy of Charleroi" ("La comédie de Charleroi")
- "A Living Dog Is Better than a Dead Lion" ("Le chien de l'écriture")
- "Expedition to the Dardanelles" ("Le voyage des Dardanelles")
- "The Infantry Officer" ("Le lieutenant de tirailleurs")
- "The Deserter" ("Le déserteur")
- "End of a War" ("La fin d'une guerre")
