= Oslo, August 31st =

2011 Norwegian drama film by Joachim Trier

- Theatrical release poster
- Norwegian: Oslo, 31. august
- Directed by: Joachim Trier
- Screenplay by: Eskil Vogt; Joachim Trier
- Based on: Will O' the Wisp by Pierre Drieu La Rochelle
- Produced by: Hans-Jørgen Osnes; Yngve Sæther; Sigve Endresen
- Starring: Anders Danielsen Lie; Hans Olav Brenner; Ingrid Olava; Øystein Røger; Tone B. Mostraum; Kjærsti Odden Skjeldal; Petter Width Kristiansen; Renate Reinsve; Andreas Braaten
- Cinematography: Jakob Ihre
- Edited by: Olivier Bugge Coutté
- Music by: Ola Fløttum; Torgny Amdam
- Production companies: Motlys; Don't Look Now
- Distributed by: Nordisk Film Distribusjon
- Release dates: 19 May 2011 (Cannes); 31 August 2011 (Norway)
- Running time: 95 minutes
- Country: Norway
- Language: Norwegian

Oslo, August 31st (Norwegian: Oslo, 31. august) is a 2011 Norwegian drama film directed by Joachim Trier. It is the second film, along with Reprise (2006) and The Worst Person in the World (2021), in Trier's Oslo trilogy. The film is a homage to, and loosely based on Pierre Drieu La Rochelle's novel Will O' the Wisp (1931) and Louis Malle's feature film The Fire Within (1963).

The film premiered at the 2011 Cannes Film Festival. It won the Best Film and Best Cinematography awards at the Stockholm International Film Festival (SIFF). It received widespread critical acclaim, and was one of three films on the Norwegian shortlist for submissions to the 84th Academy Awards for Best Foreign Language Film.

The film's title references the International Overdose Awareness Day, an annual event to raise awareness, held on August 31st.

== Plot ==
Anders is a recovering drug addict in an Oslo rehab clinic. On his first opportunity to take an overnight trip from the rehab centre, he meets an old girlfriend and then attempts suicide by filling his pockets with rocks and walking into a lake. Unable to go through with it, he returns to the rehab centre, where he does not mention his suicide attempt in group therapy.

On 30 August, he is given a day's leave to attend a job interview in the city centre. He goes to visit his friend Thomas and his wife Rebecca and their two children. While there, he admits that after meeting his old girlfriend Malin, he felt nothing, and never loved another former girlfriend, Iselin, which Thomas tries to play off. Anders slowly reveals to him that he is having suicidal thoughts. At 34 years of age, he feels he is too old to start over and is unenthused about the interview as an editorial assistant that he is applying for. He sees Thomas as being happy, but Thomas talks about his own difficulties in life including being too tired to maintain passion with his wife, having limited time to focus on his career, and the lack of true friendships as he gets older. As the two part on good terms, Thomas begs Anders not to do anything stupid, while also inviting him to a party later that evening, which is being held by their mutual friend Mirjam.

Anders goes to his job interview, but beforehand calls the girlfriend he was dating while he was on drugs, Iselin, and getting her voicemail, begs her to call him back.

At the job interview, when he is asked about the gaps in his resume, Anders admits to being a former drug addict, causing the interviewer to grow uncomfortable. Anders abruptly ends the interview, taking his application with him and throwing it in the bin.

Following his interview, Anders has plans to meet with his sister, Nina, but is surprised and angry when Nina's girlfriend, Tove, shows up instead, eventually admitting that Nina does not want to see him and finds it difficult he is being let out of rehab. Tove is supposed to go with Anders to the family home, which is being sold to pay for his rehab, but Anders refuses to let her accompany him and takes the keys and leaves alone instead.

Anders goes to Mirjam's party hoping to meet Thomas. Instead, he runs into old friends unaware of his recent sobriety, and quickly breaks it by drinking at the party. The party is Mirjam's birthday and they eventually have a conversation about how difficult Mirjam finds ageing as all her female friends have children and her male friends are dating increasingly younger women. To comfort her, Anders gives her a lingering kiss, which makes things awkward between them. Anders retreats to a room alone and again calls Iselin, leaving a message on her voicemail wondering if she still loves him and hinting that he would like to get back together with her. He then rifles through the coats and purses of the party-goers, stealing money and abruptly leaving when he is caught by Mirjam.

Anders heads to his old drug dealer's apartment where he buys a gram of heroin. He then meets up at a bar with a friend of his and two pretty young women who are still in school. At the bar, Anders sees a man staring at him who he realizes is a man that Iselin cheated on him with. Before leaving, Anders tells him he forgives him, but the man is instead angry at him, telling him that the way he treated Iselin while they were dating was cruel.

Anders and the group party well into the morning, getting drunk, making out, and eventually going to a local pool which they realize is about to be shut down as it is the last day of August. The others go swimming while Anders refuses to join them.

Anders finally goes to his family home where everything is in disarray, about to be packed up. He finally calls Iselin one last time, telling her that he did not mean anything he had previously said. He retreats to his childhood bedroom where he injects himself with a potentially lethal dose of heroin.

== Cast ==
- Anders Danielsen Lie as Anders
- Hans Olav Brenner as Thomas
- Ingrid Olava as Rebekka
- Tone Mostraum as Tove
- Renate Reinsve as Renate

== Release ==
The film premiered in the Un Certain Regard competition at the 2011 Cannes Film Festival.

=== Reception ===
Oslo, August 31st has received widespread critical acclaim from both film critics and audiences. SIFF jury president Whit Stillman called the film "a perfectly painted portrait of a generation".

Review aggregator site Rotten Tomatoes reports that 97% of critics have given the film a positive review, based on 72 reviews with an average rating of 8.3/10. The general consensus being: "An upfront study of a drug addict confronting his demons, Oslo, August 31st makes this dark journey worthwhile with fantastic directing and equally fantastic acting". Metacritic, which assigns a weighted average score out of 100 to reviews from 23 mainstream critics, reports the film has a score of 84.

Roger Ebert of the Chicago Sun-Times gave the film four out of four stars and said the film is "quietly, profoundly, one of the most observant and sympathetic films I've seen". Ebert went on to name it the ninth best film of the year in his annual list.

=== Accolades ===
In addition to its wins at the Stockholm International Film Festival, Oslo, August 31st won the Amanda Award for Best Director and Best Editing at the 2012 Norwegian International Film Festival, the Transilvania International Film Festival's top "Transilvania Trophy" and Best Screenplay awards in Romania, as well as the Special Jury Prize at the Istanbul Film Festival.

== Thematic ==
- The French song France Culture by Arnaud Fleurent-Didier was translated into Norwegian and used in a monologue read by the main character.
- The monologue I remember is inspired by the book Je me souviens by Georges Perec, which was itself inspired by the book I Remember by Joe Brainard
