= Ellen Dorrit Petersen =

Norwegian actress (born 1975)

- Born: 4 December 1975 (age 50); Tau, Norway
- Education: Oslo National Academy of the Arts
- Occupation: Actress
- Years active: 2008–present
- Known for: Blind; Aber Bergen; Borderliner
- Children: 2
- Awards: Amanda; Kanon; Gullruten

Ellen Dorrit Petersen (born 4 December 1975) is a Norwegian actress.

== Life and career ==
Petersen was born in the small town of Tau but moved to Oslo for her professional studies. She attended the Oslo National Academy of the Arts. She was active within Rogaland Teater between 2005 and 2006, then went on to work at Det Norske Teatret. Petersen debuted as a screen actress in 2008 with the drama film Troubled Water. She has played leading roles in such productions as the 2014 film Blind, ITV's Aber Bergen, and the Netflix series Borderliner.

The actress has been nominated for several awards throughout her career and has won two Amanda Awards, one Kanon, and one Gullruten award.

Petersen is married to composer Ola Fløttum, with whom she has a son and a daughter.

== Selected filmography ==
=== Film ===
List of film appearances, with year, title, and role shown
Year	Title	Role	Notes
2008	Troubled Water	Anna	
2010	King of Devil's Island	Astrid	
2011	Pax	Kathrine	
2014	Blind	Ingrid	
2015	Villmark Asylum	Live	
2016	Shelley	Louise	
2017	Thelma	Unni	
2021	The Innocents	Ida and Anna's mother	
2021	Three Wishes for Cinderella	Stepmother	
2022	Battle: Freestyle	Vivian	
2024	Armand	Sarah	
2026	Fjord	Gunda	

=== Television ===
List of television appearances, with year, title, and role shown
Year	Title	Role	Notes
2016	Frikjent	Inger Moen Hansteen	18 episodes
2016–18	Aber Bergen	Elea Bergen Wessel	30 episodes
2017	Borderliner	Anniken Høygaard-Larsen	8 episodes
2019	Wisting	Hanne Kaupang	4 episodes

== Awards and recognition ==
- Amanda Award for Best Actress in Iskyss (2009)
- Nominated for Amanda Award, Best Actress in Fjellet (2011)
- Kanon Award for Best Actress in Blind (2014)
- Amanda Award for Best Actress in Blind (2014)
- Gullruten for Best Actress in Aber Bergen (2017)
- Nominated for Gullruten, Best Actress in Aber Bergen (2018)
