= Eskil Vogt =

Norwegian film director and screenwriter (born 1974)

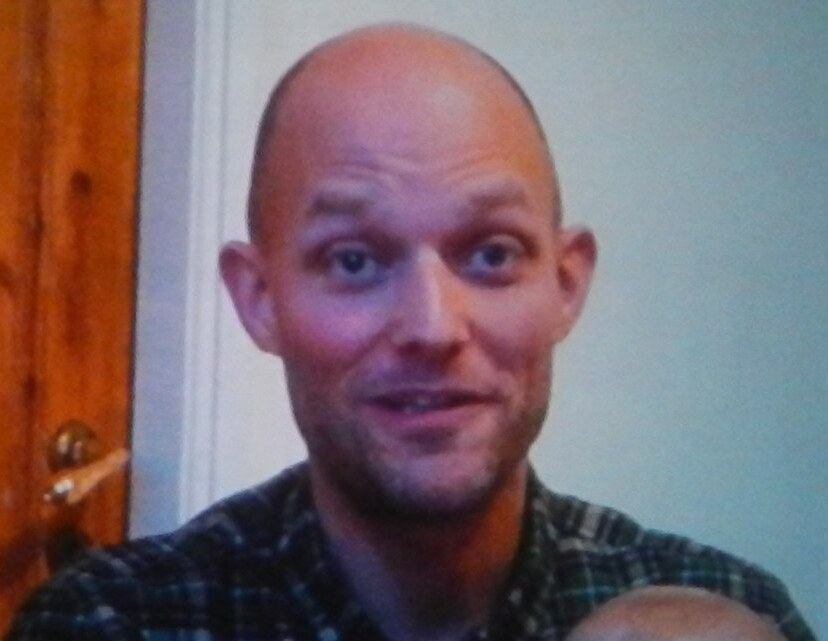
- Skyping the Sundance 2014 Awards Ceremony
- Born: 31 October 1974 (age 51); Oslo, Norway
- Education: La Fémis
- Occupations: Film director and screenwriter

Eskil Vogt (born 31 October 1974) is a Norwegian film director and screenwriter.

== Life and career ==
Born in Oslo on 31 October 1974, Vogt studied at the French film academy La Fémis.

His films include Reprise (2006), Oslo, August 31st (2011), Louder Than Bombs (2015), and Thelma (2017), all of which were directed by Joachim Trier from scripts written by Vogt and Trier.

He also wrote and directed the drama film Blind, which was screened at the 2014 Sundance Film Festival and received the World Cinema Screenwriting Award. The film was awarded the Europa Cinemas Label at the 64th Berlin International Film Festival.

In 2021, Vogt had two films at the 2021 Cannes Film Festival. The Innocents, which he wrote and directed, competed in the Un Certain Regard category, while The Worst Person in the World competed for the Palme d'Or. For his work on the latter, Vogt was nominated for the Academy Award for Best Original Screenplay at the 94th Academy Awards.

In 2026, he was a member of the Crystal Globe Competition jury at the 60th Karlovy Vary International Film Festival.

== See also ==
- List of Nordic Academy Award winners and nominees
