= Will O' the Wisp (novel) =

1931 novel by the French writer Pierre Drieu La Rochelle

- First edition cover
- Author: Pierre Drieu La Rochelle
- Original title: Le Feu follet
- Language: French
- Publisher: Éditions Gallimard
- Publication date: 1 May 1931
- Publication place: France
- English publication date: 1965
- Pages: 215

Will O' the Wisp (French: Le feu follet) is a 1931 novel by the French writer Pierre Drieu La Rochelle. It has also been published in English as The Fire Within. It tells the story of a 30-year-old man who after military service, followed by a few years of cosmopolitan, decadent life, has become burned out, addicted to heroin and tired of living. The author's source of inspiration for the main character was the dadaist poet Jacques Rigaut (1898–1929).

The novel has been the basis for two feature films, Louis Malle's The Fire Within from 1963 and Joachim Trier's Oslo, August 31st from 2011.

== Plot ==
Alain Leroy is 30 years old. He served in World War I and has led a cosmopolitan, decadent life for a few years, before being admitted to a mental institution for depression, fatigue and heroin addiction. He is unable to adapt to the regulated life of the institution, but the doctor does not think his stay needs to be extended.

Alain visits several old friends in Paris. He is presented with several opportunities to return to a regular life, but is unable to find any satisfying human connection, and other people have a hard time sympathising with his situation. Alain returns to his room at the hospital where he commits suicide.

== Publication ==
The book was published by éditions Gallimard in 1931. It was published in English in 1965, translated by Richard Howard under the title The Fire Within. A translation by Martin Robinson was published in 1966 as Will O' the Wisp. In 2012 the novel was published in Gallimard's Bibliothèque de la Pléiade series, as part of the volume Romans, récits, nouvelles. A new English language translation was published in 2021 by Rogue Scholar Press as Ghost Light.

== Reception ==
Anna Balakian of The Saturday Review wrote in 1965 that "Drieu manages an unsentimentalized objectivity in picturing the futile machinations of Alain's wasted mind[.]" Balakian continued: "Alain's nocturnal meanderings through the great, unresponsive city are illumined here and there by some erotic encounters. Thus the book is primarily a mood piece in which night prevails; as such it will be understood by the dispirited of any age and by those who watch with anguish the likes of Alain seeking the tunnel of narcotic release from which there is no exit. Although vaguely drawn, Alain is less dated as a type than many a humanistic figure projected by better known writers of the 1930s." Kirkus Reviews described the novel as "piquant, perverse, and rather sterile", and wrote: "La Rochelle handles this with a certain boutique decadence and a tired resignation (the novel is subtitled 'autobiographical') which is true to the experience ... but perhaps self-defeating to the book."

== Adaptations ==
The book was adapted for film by Louis Malle as The Fire Within, starring Maurice Ronet and released in 1963. It was also the basis for the 2011 Norwegian film Oslo, August 31st, directed by Joachim Trier.
