= Gilles (novel) =

1939 novel by Pierre Drieu La Rochelle

- Author: Pierre Drieu La Rochelle
- Language: French, English
- Publisher: Éditions Gallimard Tikhanov Library
- Publication date: 1939
- Publication place: France
- Pages: 485

Gilles is a 1939 novel by the French writer Pierre Drieu La Rochelle. It follows the life of Gilles Gambier, a Frenchman who is disgusted with the bourgeois world during World War I and the interwar period. After returning from the war, Gilles marries a Jewish woman for her wealth, becomes involved with the surrealist movement, develops his own fusion of Christianity and fascism, and joins the Nationalist faction to fight in the Spanish Civil War. The novel is partially autobiographical. Drieu La Rochelle himself considered it to be his greatest book.

== Reception ==
The French critic Gaëtan Picon wrote: "Gilles is, without any doubt, one of the greatest novels of the century—and one of those books in which the disarming sincerity of a man rises to the grandeur usually reserved to literary transpositions."

The English journalist Will Self wrote that Gilles is "as good and unapologetic an account of what it was to be a fascist during this era as André Malaraux's Man's Fate is one of what it was to be a communist."

Columbia professor Mark Lilla wrote: "Gilles is a tragic novel. Its main character, Gilles Gambier, is no highly polished hero. He, too, is a victim of the modern decadence he wants to combat."

== Translations ==
In 2024 the publishing house Tikhanov Library released the first of three volumes of an English translation of Gilles.
