= Tone Mostraum =

Norwegian actress (born 1974)

- Born: Tone Mostraum; 9 December 1974 (age 51)
- Occupation: Actress
- Years active: 1999 – present

Tone Beate Mostraum (born 9 December 1974) is a Norwegian actress. She graduated from the Norwegian National Academy of Theatre in 1999, and has since acted both at Trøndelag Teater and at the National Theatre, in roles such as Nora in Henrik Ibsen's play A Doll's House, and Torunn in Anne B. Ragde's Berlinerpoplene. She became known to a national audience through her role as Randi in the television series Svarte penger, hvite løgner in 2004, Kampen for tilværelsen in 2014, and Presten in 2017. She also starred in Joachim Trier's Oslo, August 31st in 2011.
