= Pierre Drieu La Rochelle =

French writer (1893–1945)

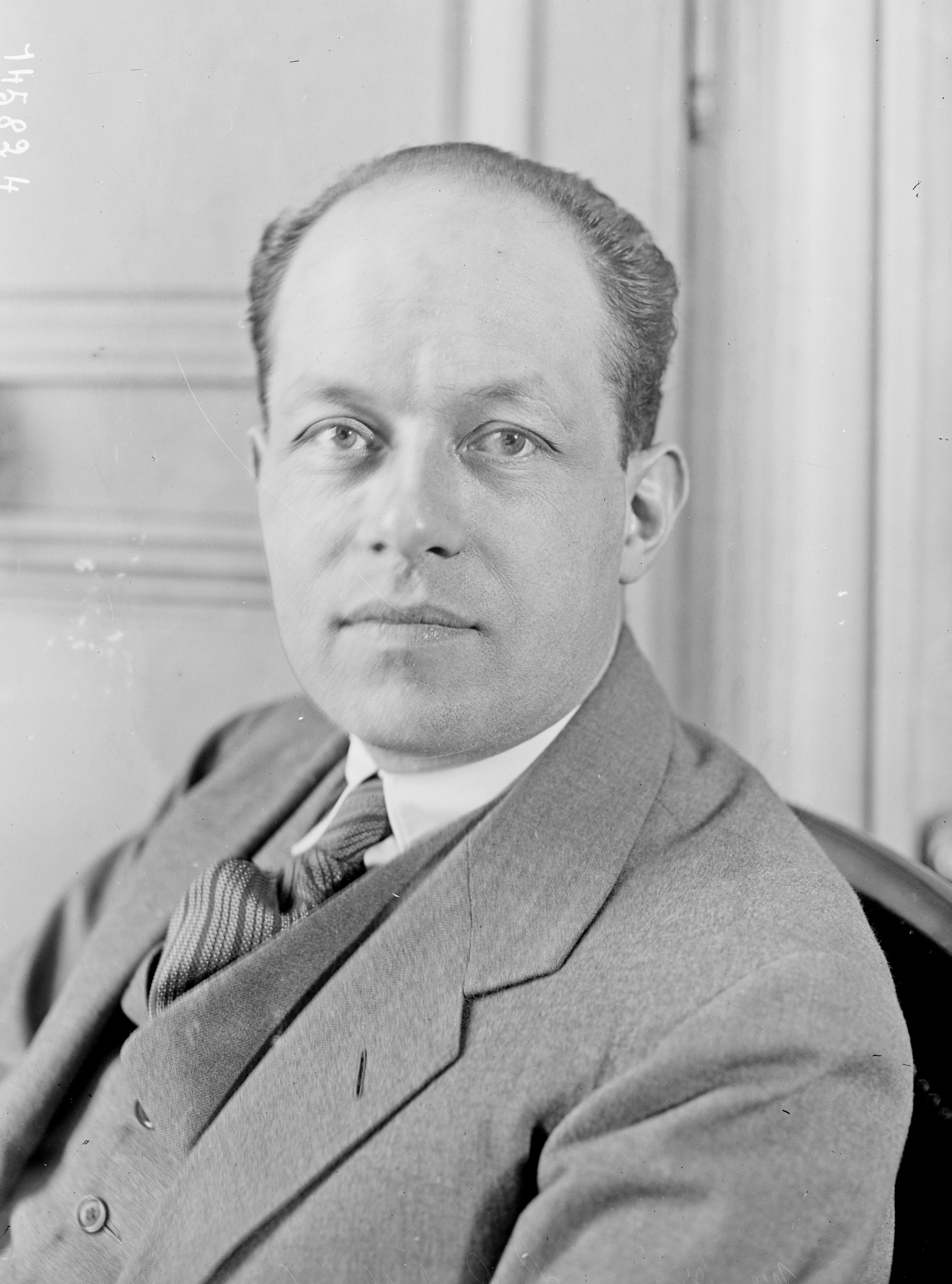
- Drieu La Rochelle in 1930
- Born: Pierre Eugène Drieu La Rochelle; 3 January 1893; Paris, France
- Died: 15 March 1945 (aged 52); Paris, France
- Occupations: Novelist, short story writer, essayist
- Writing career
- Language: French
- Notable works: Le Feu Follet (1931); Gilles (1939)

Pierre Eugène Drieu La Rochelle (French: [dʁjø la ʁɔʃɛl]; 3 January 1893 – 15 March 1945) was a French writer of novels, short stories, and political essays. He was born, lived and died in Paris. Drieu La Rochelle became a proponent of French fascism in the 1930s, and was a well-known collaborationist during the German occupation. He is best known for his books Le Feu Follet and Gilles.

== Early life ==
Drieu was born into a middle class family from Normandy, based in the 17th arrondissement of Paris. His father was an unsuccessful lawyer who relied on his wife's dowry and ended up squandering it, being "responsible for a sharp decline in the family's social status" by the time of his son's adolescence.

Although a brilliant student, Pierre failed his final exam at the École Libre des Sciences Politiques. Wounded three times, his experience as a soldier during World War I had a deep influence on him and marked him for the rest of his life.

In 1917, Drieu married Colette Jéramec, the sister of a Jewish friend. They divorced in 1921. Sympathetic to Dada and to the Surrealists and the Communists, and a close friend of Louis Aragon in the 1920s, he was also interested in the royalist Action Française, but refused to adhere to any one of these political currents. He wrote Mesure de la France ("Measure of France") in 1922, which gave him some small notoriety, and edited several novels.

In Drieu's political writings, he argued that the parliamentary system (the gouvernement d'assemblée of the French Third Republic) was responsible for what he saw as the "decadence" of France (economic crisis, declining birth rates, etc.). In his essays "Le Jeune Européen" ("European Youth", 1927) and "Genève ou Moscou" ("Geneva or Moscow", 1928), Drieu La Rochelle advocated a strong Europe and denounced the "decadent materialism" of democracy. He believed that a federal Europe could bolster a strong economic and political union isolated from the imperialist Russians and Americans; in 1939 he came to believe that only Nazi Germany could deliver such an autarkian promise.

His pro-European views expressed in 1928 were soon followed by closer contacts with employers' organizations, among them Ernest Mercier's Redressement Français, and then, at the end of the 1920s and the beginning of the 1930s, with some currents of the Radical Party.

== Fascism and collaboration ==
As late as 1931, in his essay L'Europe contre les patries ("Europe Against the homelands"), Drieu was writing as an anti-Hitlerian, but by 1934, especially after the 6 February 1934 riots organized by far right leagues before the Palais Bourbon, and then a visit to Nazi Germany in September 1935 (where he witnessed the Reichsparteitag rally in Nuremberg), he embraced Nazism as an antidote to the "mediocrity" of liberal democracy. After the 6 February 1934 riots, he contributed to the review La Lutte des Jeunes and reinvented himself as a fascist. The title of his October 1934 book Socialisme Fasciste ("Fascist Socialism") was representative of his politics at the time. In it, he described his discontent with Marxism as an answer to France's problems. He wrote that he found inspiration in Georges Sorel, Fernand Pelloutier, and the earlier French socialism of Saint-Simon, Charles Fourier, and Proudhon.

Drieu La Rochelle joined Jacques Doriot's fascist Parti Populaire Français (PPF) in 1936, and became the editor of its review, L'Emancipation Nationale, until his break with the party beginning in 1939. In 1937, with Avec Doriot, he argued for a specifically French fascism. He continued writing his most famous novel, Gilles, during this time.

He supported collaborationism and the Nazis' occupation of northern France. During the occupation of Paris, Drieu succeeded Jean Paulhan (whom he saved twice from the hands of the Gestapo) as director of the Nouvelle Revue Française and thus became a leading figure of French cultural collaboration with the Nazi occupiers, who he hoped would become the leader of a "Fascist International". His friendship with the German ambassador in Paris, Otto Abetz, pre-dated the war. He was a member of the committee of the Groupe Collaboration. Beginning in 1943, however, he became disillusioned by the New Order, and turned to the study of Eastern spirituality.

In a final, provocative act, he again embraced Jacques Doriot's PPF, simultaneously declaring in his secret diary his admiration for Stalinism. Upon the liberation of Paris in 1944, Drieu had to go into hiding. Despite the protection of his friend André Malraux, and after a failed first attempt in July 1944, Drieu committed suicide in Paris on 15 March 1945 by a combination of drug overdose and gas inhalation, two months before the end of World War II in Europe, after multiple failed attempts and facing imminent arrest for his collaborationist activities during the German occupation by the Nazi general Dietrich von Choltitz.

== Works ==
The following list is not exhaustive.

- Interrogation (1917), poems
- Etat civil (1921)
- "Mesure de la France" (1922), essay
- L'homme couvert de femmes (1925), novel
- "Le Jeune Européen" (1927), essay
- "Genève ou Moscou" (1928), essay
- Hotel Acropolis (Une femme à sa fenêtre) (1929), novel
- "L'Europe contre les patries" (1931), essay
- Will O' the Wisp (Le Feu Follet) (1931). This short novel narrates the last days of a former heroin user who commits suicide. It was inspired by the death of Drieu's friend, the surrealist poet Jacques Rigaut. Louis Malle adapted it for the screen in 1963 as The Fire Within. Joachim Trier adapted it as Oslo, August 31st in 2011. Translated into English and published in 2021 as Ghost Light by Rogue Scholar Press.
- Drôle de voyage (1933), novel
- The Comedy of Charleroi (La comédie de Charleroi) (1934), is a collection of short stories in which Drieu attempts to deal with his war trauma.
- Socialisme Fasciste (1934), essay
- Beloukia (1936), novel
- Rêveuse bourgeoisie (1937). In this novel, Drieu tells the story of his parents' failed marriage.
- "Avec Doriot" (1937), political pamphlet
- Gilles (1939) is Drieu's major work. It is simultaneously an autobiographical novel and a bitter indictment of inter-war France.
- "Ne plus attendre" (1941), essay
- "Notes pour comprendre le siècle" (1941), essay
- "Chronique politique" (1943), essay
- The Man on Horseback (L'homme à cheval) (1943), novel
- Les chiens de paille (1944), novel
- "Le Français d'Europe" (1944), essay
- Histoires déplaisantes (1963, posthumous), short stories
- Mémoires de Dirk Raspe (1966, posthumous), novel
- Journal d'un homme trompé (1978, posthumous), short stories
- Journal de guerre (1992, posthumous), war diary

== Bibliography ==
- Andreu, Pierre and Grover, Frederic, Drieu la Rochelle, Paris, Hachette 1979.
- Carrol, David, French literary fascism, Princeton University Press 1998.
- Dambre, Marc (ed.), Drieu la Rochelle écrivain et intellectuel, Paris, Presses de la Sorbonne Nouvelle 1995.
- Hervier, Julien, Deux individus contre l’Histoire : Pierre Drieu la Rochelle et Ernst Jünger, Paris, Klincksieck 1978
- Lecarme, Jacques, Drieu la Rochelle ou la bal des maudits, Paris, Presses Universitaires Françaises, 2001.
- Mauthner, Martin, Otto Abetz and His Paris Acolytes - French Writers Who Flirted with Fascism, 1930–1945. Liverpool University Press, 2016; (ISBN 978-1-84519-784-1)
