= Thelma (2017 film) =

2017 film by Joachim Trier

- Theatrical release poster
- Directed by: Joachim Trier
- Written by: Eskil Vogt; Joachim Trier
- Produced by: Thomas Robsahm
- Starring: Eili Harboe; Kaya Wilkins; Henrik Rafaelsen; Ellen Dorrit Petersen
- Cinematography: Jakob Ihre
- Edited by: Olivier Bugge Coutté
- Music by: Ola Fløttum
- Production companies: Motlys; Film i Väst; Le Pacte; Filmpool Nord; Snowglobe; B-Reel Films; Don't Look Now; Copenhagen Film Fund
- Distributed by: SF Norge (Norway); TriArt Film (Sweden); Camera Film (Denmark); Le Pacte (France)
- Release dates: 20 August 2017 (Norwegian International Film Festival); 15 September 2017 (Norway); 17 November 2017 (Sweden); 22 November 2017 (France); 30 November 2017 (Denmark)
- Running time: 116 minutes
- Countries: Norway; Sweden; Denmark; France
- Language: Norwegian
- Budget: €5 million
- Box office: $1.5 million

Thelma is a 2017 supernatural thriller drama film directed by Joachim Trier, who co-wrote the screenplay with Eskil Vogt. The film stars Eili Harboe, Kaya Wilkins, Henrik Rafaelsen, and Ellen Dorrit Petersen. Thelma tells the story of a sheltered young woman who discovers she has an inexplicable power that materializes when she feels desire for a female student at her university.

Thelma was selected as the Norwegian entry for the Academy Award for Best Foreign Language Film at the 90th Academy Awards, but did not receive the nomination.

== Plot ==
Thelma is a lonely and repressed young woman from an ultra-religious Christian family who has lived a sheltered life under the protection of her father, Trond, and disabled mother, Unni. She struggles to make friends and soon after moving to Oslo to attend university begins to experience unexplained psychogenic non-epileptic seizures. When she meets another student, Anja, she discovers that her feelings for Anja trigger uncontrollable psychokinetic powers. Thelma suffers much guilt over her feelings for Anja, and wishes she was not in love with her.

While undergoing a brain tomography test to find the cause of her seizures, she begins to think about Anja and as she focuses on her, Thelma's power is set in motion and she unconsciously and unwittingly makes Anja vanish into empty space. Distraught and confused by Anja's sudden disappearance, Thelma returns home and soon remembers that when she was a little girl, she had a baby brother. Once, when feeling neglected and jealous of the attention given to her younger sibling, and wishing him to be quiet and gone, she involuntarily caused him to teleport from his crib and reappear underneath the sofa. In a final tragic incident, she caused him to disappear from his bath, and he was found trapped below the ice of a frozen lake by her father. Traumatised, Thelma's mother tried to take her own life by jumping off a bridge, but instead the failed attempt left her paraplegic. Thelma had forgotten these events. Realising her utter distress, her parents tell her the truth, which is that she is somehow able to manifest whatever she deeply wants and that she inherited the same inexplicable ability from her grandmother (who blamed herself for the disappearance of Thelma's grandfather and was kept sedated in a psychiatric nursing home by Trond). Thelma perceives that her parents have a similar fate in mind for her as her grandmother. Though Trond expresses some misgivings about drugging Thelma, Unni tells him it is their responsibility to stop Thelma.

Earlier, while visiting Anja, Thelma had recalled how her father once held her hand over a lit candle until it almost burned so that she could feel what Hell's eternal fire was like. She causes the death of her father by telekinetically making him self-combust while out boating on the unfrozen lake. Thelma realises that her power can also restore life when she revives a small dead bird. She begins to understand that her supernatural ability is also a gift and uses it to heal her mother, making her able to walk again. Along with the realisation that she can summon her power, Thelma is able to finally control it, and brings Anja back to existence. She returns to college, now with Anja as her girlfriend.

== Cast ==
- Eili Harboe as Thelma
  - Grethe Eltervåg as young Thelma
- Kaya Wilkins as Anja
- Henrik Rafaelsen as Trond
- Ellen Dorrit Petersen as Unni

== Production ==
Thelma was produced by Thomas Robsahm of Norwegian production company Motlys, and co-produced by Film Väst, Filmpool Nord and B-Reel (Sweden), Snowglobe Film (Denmark), and Le Pacte (France); with financial support provided by the Norwegian Film Institute, Swedish Film Institute, Danish Film Institute, Copenhagen Film Fund, Nordic Film & TV Fund, Eurimages, and MEDIA Programme. The final production budget (Note: The first reported budget was 39 million NOK.) was €5,009,000 (i.e. 47 million NOK, 5.8 million USD).

Principal photography began on 20 September 2016 and lasted 44 days. Locations included Oslo in Norway, and Västra Götaland, Gothenburg, Trollhättan and Kiruna in Sweden.

The film poster was released in August 2017. The key art for the U.S. was released in September in advance of the American premiere, followed by the UK in October.

== Release ==
The film premiered at the Norwegian International Film Festival on 20 August 2017. Thelma held its international premiere at the Toronto International Film Festival as a Special Presentation on 9 September. It premiered in the United States at Fantastic Fest on 21 September, and screened at the New York Film Festival as a Main Slate selection on 6 October. It premiered in the United Kingdom at the BFI London Film Festival as a Cult Gala presentation on 14 October.

Thelma was released theatrically in Norway on 15 September. It was released in the United Kingdom on 3 November, followed by the United States on 10 November.

The Orchard acquired the North American distribution rights to the film in April the same year. Distribution rights to the United Kingdom were acquired by Thunderbird Releasing in August.

== Critical reception ==
On the review aggregator website Rotten Tomatoes, the film holds an approval rating of 92% based on 153 reviews, with an average rating of 7.3/10. The website's critics consensus reads, "Thelma plays with genre tropes in unexpected ways, delivering a thoughtfully twisty supernatural thriller with a lingering impact." Metacritic, which uses a weighted average, assigned the film a score of 74 out of 100, based on 32 critics, indicating "generally favorable" reviews. In IndieWire's annual critics poll of best films and performances, it was selected a "Critics Pick" for Best Foreign Language Film. The Hollywood Reporter selected Thelma as one of the best LGBTQ films of 2017.

Manohla Dargis wrote in The New York Times that Thelma is "a romance, a psychological thriller, a liberation story and a whodunit (and why) ... and most satisfyingly, it plays with the female Gothic ... in which women are at once the victims and agents of change", praising Joachim Trier with having "a great talent for making loneliness visceral and visible, for showing how pain can make the world disappear". In the Los Angeles Times, Justin Chang said the film was a "muted and moody supernatural chiller" that is "thoughtful and beautifully composed" with sequences "that tap into a vividly primal sense of terror".

Peter Bradshaw of The Guardian described Thelma as "an uncanny accumulation of mood, an ecstasy of disquiet" and the performance by Eili Harboe as "outstandingly good". AfterEllen praised the performance by Harboe as "exhilarating, and incredibly moving", and said that "in a sea of lesbian films that are often repetitive, Thelma explores analytical territory that none other has before". David Friend of The Canadian Press said the film carries "an ominous and sinister tone that evokes the best traits of classics like 'Carrie' and 'Let the Right One In'".

Bilge Ebiri of The Village Voice described the film's story as moving "away from the monstrous, toward compassion and understanding ... prob[ing] the profound underlying sadness beneath tales of possession" and "makes vivid the protagonist's loneliness and despair". David Ehrlich wrote in IndieWire that Thelma was "an ominous, unnerving, and strangely powerful thriller about the most devious of human desires" and "consistently keyed in to the persuasive power of the female body".

In The Hollywood Reporter, David Rooney said it contained "intelligent, measured tone and elegant visual style" and "while the more enigmatic supernatural elements at times veer close to formulaic Hollywood horror tropes, the movie maintains a compelling seriousness, particularly in its consideration of the conflict between sexuality and repression". Andrew Barker of Variety described the film as "an unnervingly effective slow-burn, and those with the patience for Trier’s patient accumulation of detail will find it pays off in unexpected ways".

The Verge said Thelma was a "quietly beautiful film" and "a thriller that's scary, sad, and ultimately triumphant", with cinematography that is "visually ... striking throughout". Margaret Barton-Fumo from Film Comment summarized Thelma as "a romantic film that pays close attention to physical detail", and "surprisingly tender, [it] proves itself a modern take on the supernatural film".

== Accolades ==
Award	Date of ceremony	Category	Recipient and nominee	Result	Ref
Norwegian International Film Festival	24 August 2017	Norwegian Critics Prize	Thelma	Won	
Méliès International Festivals Federation	3 November 2017	Méliès d'Or	Thelma	Won	
Lübeck Nordic Film Days	5 November 2017	Baltic Jury Award	Thelma	Won	
San Diego Film Critics Society	11 December 2017	Best Foreign Language Film	Thelma	Won	
Utah Film Critics Association	17 December 2017	Non-English Language Film	Thelma	Won	
Houston Film Critics Society	6 January 2018	Best Foreign Language Film	Thelma	Won	
Critics' Choice Movie Awards	11 January 2018	Best Foreign Language Film	Thelma	Nominated	
Kosmorama International Film Festival	8 March 2018	Best Picture	Thelma	Nominated	
Kosmorama International Film Festival	8 March 2018	Best Producer	Thomas Robsahm	Nominated	
Kosmorama International Film Festival	8 March 2018	Best Director	Joachim Trier	Nominated	
Kosmorama International Film Festival	8 March 2018	Best Actress	Eili Harboe	Won	
Kosmorama International Film Festival	8 March 2018	Best Actor	Henrik Rafaelsen	Won	
Kosmorama International Film Festival	8 March 2018	Best Screenplay	Eskil Vogt, Joachim Trier	Nominated	
Kosmorama International Film Festival	8 March 2018	Best Production Design	Roger Rosenberg	Nominated	
Kosmorama International Film Festival	8 March 2018	Best Film Music	Ola Fløttum	Won	
Kosmorama International Film Festival	8 March 2018	Best Editing	Olivier Bugge Coutts	Won	
Kosmorama International Film Festival	8 March 2018	Best Sound Design	Gisle Tveito	Nominated	
GLAAD Media Award	12 April 2018	Outstanding Film – Limited Release	Thelma	Nominated	
Amanda Award	18 August 2018	Best Norwegian Movie	Thelma	Nominated	
Amanda Award	18 August 2018	Best Director	Joachim Trier	Nominated	
Amanda Award	18 August 2018	Best Actress	Eili Harboe	Nominated	
Amanda Award	18 August 2018	Best Actor	Henrik Rafaelsen	Nominated	
Amanda Award	18 August 2018	Best Supporting Actress	Kaya Wilkins	Nominated	
Amanda Award	18 August 2018	Best Screenplay	Eskil Vogt, Joachim Trier	Nominated	
Amanda Award	18 August 2018	Best Cinematography	Jakob Ihre	Won	
Amanda Award	18 August 2018	Best Production Design/Scenography	Roger Rosenberg	Nominated	
Amanda Award	18 August 2018	Best Visual Effects	Esben Syberg (Shortcut)	Nominated	
Amanda Award	18 August 2018	Best Music	Ola Fløttum	Won	
Amanda Award	18 August 2018	Best Editing	Olivier Bugge Coutts	Won	
Amanda Award	18 August 2018	Best Sound Design	Gisle Tveito	Nominated	
Nordic Council Film Prize	30 October 2018	Award	Thelma	Nominated	

== Home media ==
The DVD for Region 2 and Blu-ray for Region B was released by SF Studios in Scandinavia on 4 December 2017. They were released in the UK by Thunderbird Releasing on 26 February 2018. In Region 1 the DVD was released by The Orchard through Passion River Films on 3 April 2018.

== See also ==
- List of LGBT-related films
- Lists of Norwegian films
- List of Norwegian submissions for the Academy Award for Best Foreign Language Film
- List of submissions to the 90th Academy Awards for Best Foreign Language Film
