= People in the Sun =

2011 Norwegian comedy film

- Film poster
- Norwegian: Mennesker i solen
- Directed by: Per-Olav Sørensen
- Starring: Kjersti Holmen; Ingar Helge Gimle
- Music by: Kristian Eidnes Andersen
- Release date: 4 March 2011
- Running time: 78 minutes
- Country: Norway
- Language: Norwegian

People in the Sun (Norwegian: Mennesker i solen) is a 2011 Norwegian comedy film directed by Per-Olav Sørensen.

== Cast ==
- Kjersti Holmen as Siv
- Ingar Helge Gimle as Svein
- Ane Dahl Torp as Ingrid
- Jon Øigarden as Stig
- Ghita Nørby as Fru Sørensen
