= Hvaler (TV series) =

Norwegian television series

- Also known as: Maria
- Genre: Drama
- Created by: Arne Berggren
- Written by: Arne Berggren
- Directed by: Margret Bergheim
- Starring: Charlotte Frogner; Cato Skimten Storengen; Ingar Helge Gimle; Lise Fjeldstad; Anne Marit Jacobsen; Kim Haugen; Minken Tveitan; Sigrid Edvardsson
- Opening theme: "Alt du vil av" by Raymond Enoksen and Geirmund Simonsen
- Country of origin: Norway
- Original language: Norwegian
- No. of seasons: 2
- No. of episodes: 24

Production
- Executive producer: Agnete Thuland
- Producer: Trond Berg-Nilssen
- Production location: Hvaler
- Production company: Rubicon TV

Original release
- Network: TV 2
- Release: 29 September 2008 – 30 November 2010

Hvaler (also known as Maria) is a Norwegian drama written by Arne Berggren, produced by Rubicon TV for TV 2. The first season of the series was shown on TV 2 from September to December 2008, while the second season was shown from September to November 2010. Recording of the first season took place in Hvaler during the period May to October 2008, while the second season was recorded in 2009.

The series won the award for best miniseries (Best Mini-series) during the Seoul International Drama Awards 2009, under the name of Maria.

== Cast ==
- Charlotte Frogner as Maria Blix
- Cato Skimten Storengen as Mads Jansen
- Maria Bock as Tove
- Lise Fjeldstad as Liv Hansen
- Sigrid Edvardsson as Tara Blix Hansen
- Axel Aubert as Vidar Blix Hansen
- Dagrun Anholt as Rita Hansen
- Erik Hivju as Fritjof Wang
- Anne Marit Jacobsen as Hilde Henningsen
- Gard B. Eidsvold as Steinar Baltersen
- Turid Gunnes as Kari Baltersen
- Minken Tveitan as Ylva Baltersen
- Ingar Helge Gimle as Trygve Eriksen
- Ågot Sendstad as Kjersti Eriksen
- Truls Einar Toftnes as Steffen Eriksen
- Stig Henrik Hoff as Espen Aronsen
- Lisa Loven Kongsli as Lone
- Kaia Varjord as Heidi
- Bjarte Hjelmeland as Edvard Borg
- Hedda Munthe as Karoline Borg
- Odin Waage as Tormod Borg
- Hanne Dahle as Astrid
- Tobias Santelmann as Ole Marius Aronsen
- Jakob Oftebro as Mikkel Olsen
- Liv Strand Nordin as Wilma
- Maria Sand as Venja
- Solveig Nuin Stephens as Liz
- Aslag Guttormsgaard as Marius Father
- Heidi Goldmann as Marius Mother
- Alex Bermann as Marius
- Zbigniew Franciszek Dluski as Andreij
- Sylwita Stasiak-Emilsen as Agnes
- Kalle Øby as Kjell Benestad
- Jorunn Kjellsby as Greta Herlofsen
- Dag Christian Klevås Rye as Hardware Dealer
- Jeppe Beck Laursen as Stian Kjeldsen
- Svein Roger Karlsen as Lensmann Rolf
- Simon Lay as Tom
- Terje Brevik as Reidar Tallaksen
- Signy Sandsberg as Vera Tallaksen
- Mattis Herman Nyquist as Jon
- Cecilie Jørstad as Trine
- Peter Bredal as Trine's father
- Bente Børsum as Trine's mother
- Espen Reboli Bjerke as Terje Solstad
- Ine Finholt Jansen as Benedikte
- Harald Sørlie as Food Inspector
- Helle Ottesen as Mrs Eriksen
- Thorbjørn Harr as Bjørn Kvisgård
- Bjørn Skagestad as Vebjørn Thilesen
- Geir Atle Johnsen as Newspaper Editor
- Jan Sælid as Karl Folkvord
- Jesper Malm as Betjent Otto
- Håkon Ramstad as Geir Aanonsen
- Trine Wiggen as Venke Aanonsen
- Mathias Augestad Ambjør as Stian Aanonsen
- Kim Haugen as Jørgen Philstrøm

== Episodes ==
=== Series overview ===
| Series | Episodes | Originally released | |
| Series | Episodes | First released | Last released |
|---|---|---|---|
| 1 | 12 | 29 September 2008 | 15 December 2008 |
| 2 | 12 | 14 September 2010 | 30 November 2010 |

=== Season 1 (2008) ===
| No. | Title | Directed by | Written by | Original release date |
|---|---|---|---|---|
| 1 | "Maria" | Margret Bergheim | Arne Berggren | 29 September 2008 |
| 2 | "Tinnsoldaten" | Margret Bergheim | Arne Berggren | 6 October 2008 |
| 3 | "Sinnadamen" | Margret Bergheim | Unknown | 13 October 2008 |
| 4 | "Bloksberg" | Cathrine Irgens Nilsen | Arne Berggren | 20 October 2008 |
| 5 | "Gutta" | Cathrine Irgens Nilsen | Unknown | 27 October 2008 |
| 6 | "Hyper" | Cathrine Irgens Nilsen | Sverre Knudsen | 3 November 2008 |
| 7 | "Forlis" | Margret Bergheim | Arne Berggren | 10 November 2008 |
| 8 | "Sisyfos" | Margret Bergheim | Pål Bistrup | 17 November 2008 |
| 9 | "Akkurat som før" | Margret Bergheim | Pål Bistrup | 24 November 2008 |
| 10 | "Tunnelen" | Audny Chris Øiamo-Holsen | Arne Berggren | 1 December 2008 |
| 11 | "Mannen som hatet pokaler" | Audny Chris Øiamo-Holsen | Arne Berggren | 8 December 2008 |
| 12 | "Hjem" | Audny Chris Øiamo-Holsen | Arne Berggren | 15 December 2008 |

=== Season 2 (2010) ===
| No. overall | No. in series | Title | Directed by | Written by | Original release date |
|---|---|---|---|---|---|
| 13 | 1 | "Bryllupet" | Margret Bergheim | Arne Berggren | 14 September 2010 |
| 14 | 2 | "Ryktet" | Margret Bergheim | Arne Berggren | 21 September 2010 |
| 15 | 3 | "Gode råd" | Margret Bergheim | Arne Berggren | 28 September 2010 |
| 16 | 4 | "Quiz" | Camilla Strøm-Henriksen | Arne Berggren | 5 October 2010 |
| 17 | 5 | "Mamma Mia" | Camilla Strøm-Henriksen | Pål Bistrup | 12 October 2010 |
| 18 | 6 | "Brødre" | Camilla Strøm-Henriksen | Arne Berggren | 19 October 2010 |
| 19 | 7 | "Indisium" | Lisa Marie Gamlem | Arne Berggren | 26 October 2010 |
| 20 | 8 | "Tvillingen" | Lisa Marie Gamlem | Arne Berggren | 2 November 2010 |
| 21 | 9 | "Gjennombrudd" | Lisa Marie Gamlem | Arne Berggren | 9 November 2010 |
| 22 | 10 | "Nøkkelen" | Arne Berggren | Arne Berggren | 16 November 2010 |
| 23 | 11 | "Tvil" | Arne Berggren | Arne Berggren | 23 November 2010 |
| 24 | 12 | "Advent" | Arne Berggren | Arne Berggren | 30 November 2010 |
