= Joachim Trier =

Norwegian filmmaker (born 1974)

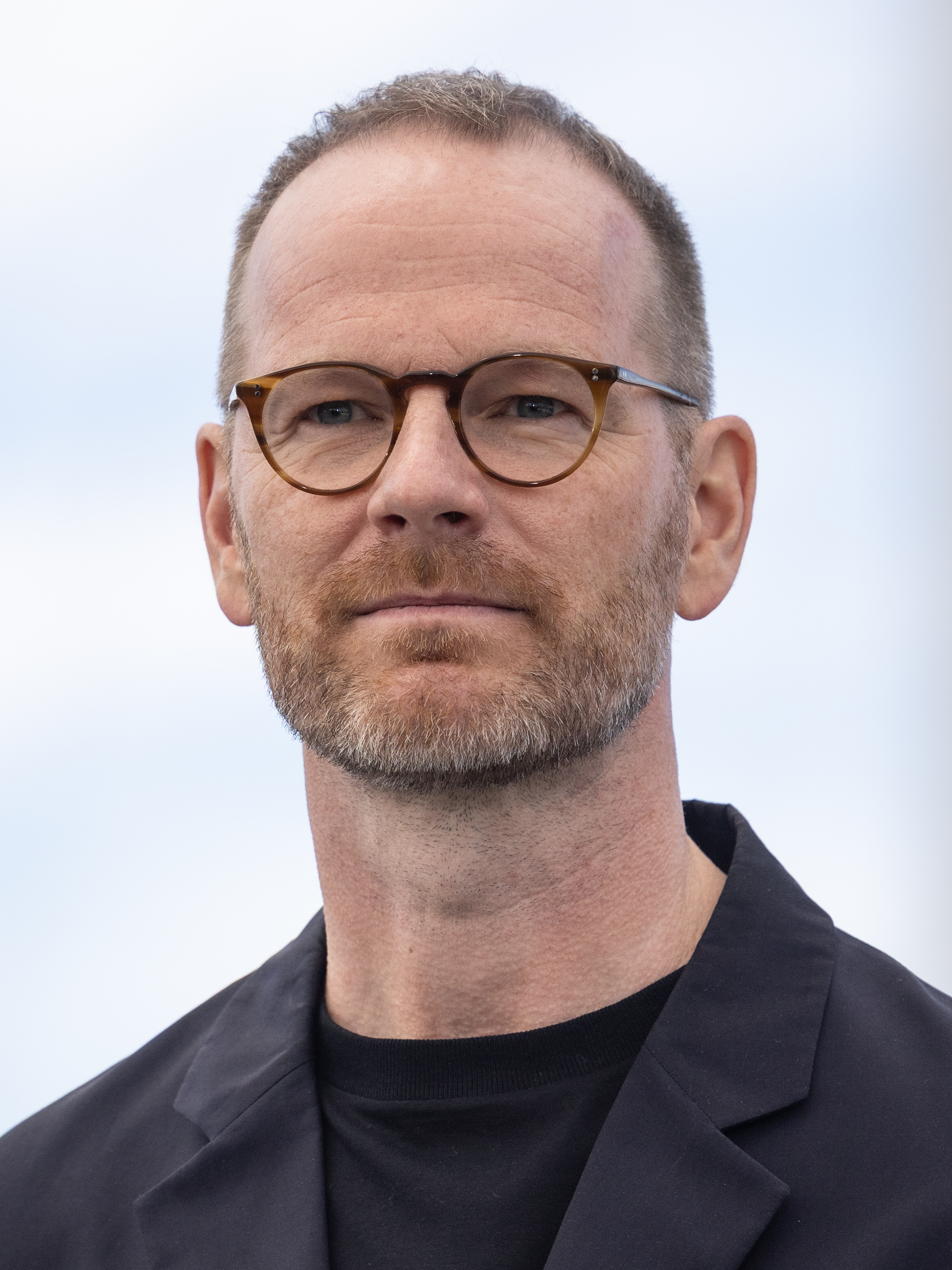
- Trier at the 2025 Cannes Film Festival
- Born: 1 March 1974 (age 52); Copenhagen, Denmark
- Education: National Film and Television School
- Occupation: Film director
- Years active: 2000–present

Joachim Trier (Norwegian: [ˈjùːɑˌkɪm ˈtɾìːəɾ]; born 1 March 1974) is a Norwegian filmmaker. His films have been described as "melancholy meditations concerned with existential questions of love, ambition, memory, and identity." He has received numerous accolades, including the Grand Prix at the Cannes Film Festival and an Academy Award accepted for Best International Film, as well as nominations for three Academy Awards, four BAFTAs, two Golden Globe Awards, and two César Awards.

He is best known for his Oslo trilogy which comprises the films Reprise (2006), Oslo, August 31st (2011), and The Worst Person in the World (2021), which was nominated for the Best Original Screenplay at the 94th Academy Awards. He is also known for Louder Than Bombs (2015), Thelma (2017) and The Other Munch (2018). For Sentimental Value (2025), he was nominated for Best Original Screenplay and Best Director at the 98th Academy Awards.

== Early life and education ==
Trier was born in Copenhagen, Denmark, to a Danish father and a Norwegian mother, and raised in Oslo, Norway. His father, Jacob Trier, was the sound technician of The Pinchcliffe Grand Prix, a notable film produced in Norway in 1975. His grandfather was Erik Løchen, artistic director of Norsk Film from 1981 to 1983 and also a filmmaker and screenwriter known for such experimental work as his 1972 film Remonstrance, which was constructed so that its five reels could be shown in any order, rendering 120 possible versions of its radical story of a film crew trying to make a political film.

As a teenager, Trier was a skateboarding champion who shot and produced his own skateboarding videos. He studied at the European Film College in Ebeltoft, Denmark and at the National Film and Television School in the United Kingdom.

Trier holds both Norwegian and Danish citizenship.

== Career ==
=== 2000–2006: Early work ===
Trier started his career writing and directing short films. His early short films include Pietà (2000) and Still (2001). After graduating from National Film and Television School Trier directed the short film Procter, a thriller revolving around a man who watches a suicide on a videotape and investigates the mystery surrounding the incident. The film premiered at the Edinburgh International Film Festival where he gained prominence winning the Best British Short Award. Ellen Margrethe Sand of Verdens Gang praised Trier, writing, "[He] utilises the scarcely allotted time and his film medium to the last drop". The short would also earn nominations for the European Film Award for Best Short Film and the Amanda Award in Norway.

Trier's debut film, Reprise, is about two aspiring writers and their volatile relationship. Released by Miramax in 2006, it received Norway's top film awards, the Amanda Award and the Aamot Statuette. Internationally, it won awards at film festivals in Toronto, Istanbul, Rotterdam, Milan, and Karlovy Vary. Trier was named one of Variety's "10 Directors to Watch" in 2007.

=== 2011–present: Breakthrough and acclaim ===
Trier gained prominence for his Norwegian drama film Oslo, August 31st (2011). His sophomore effort as a director, the film revolves around a day in the life of Anders (Anders Danielsen Lie), a recovering drug addict who catches up with old friends in Oslo. The film premiered in the Un Certain Regard section at the 2011 Cannes Film Festival. The film is considered to be an adaptation of the Pierre Drieu La Rochelle novel Will O' the Wisp (1931) and Louis Malle's The Fire Within (1963). It received critical acclaim and awards and was featured on several critics' 2012 Top 10 lists. A.O. Scott of The New York Times declared it a "perfectly linear story that bristles with suspense and ambiguity".

Trier was named as one of the jury members for the Cinéfondation and short film sections of the 2014 Cannes Film Festival. In 2015, Trier directed the English-language film Louder Than Bombs, starring Jesse Eisenberg, Gabriel Byrne, and Isabelle Huppert. It was selected to compete for the Palme d'Or at the 2015 Cannes Film Festival where it received positive reviews with acclaim for its leading performance from Huppert. His fourth feature, the supernatural horror-romance Thelma, screened at the 2017 Toronto International Film Festival to positive reviews. Andrew Barber of Variety praised the film describing it as an, "unnervingly effective slow-burn, and those with the patience for Trier's patient accumulation of detail will find it pays off in unexpected ways." It was selected as the Norwegian entry for the Best Foreign Language Film at the 90th Academy Awards, held in 2018.

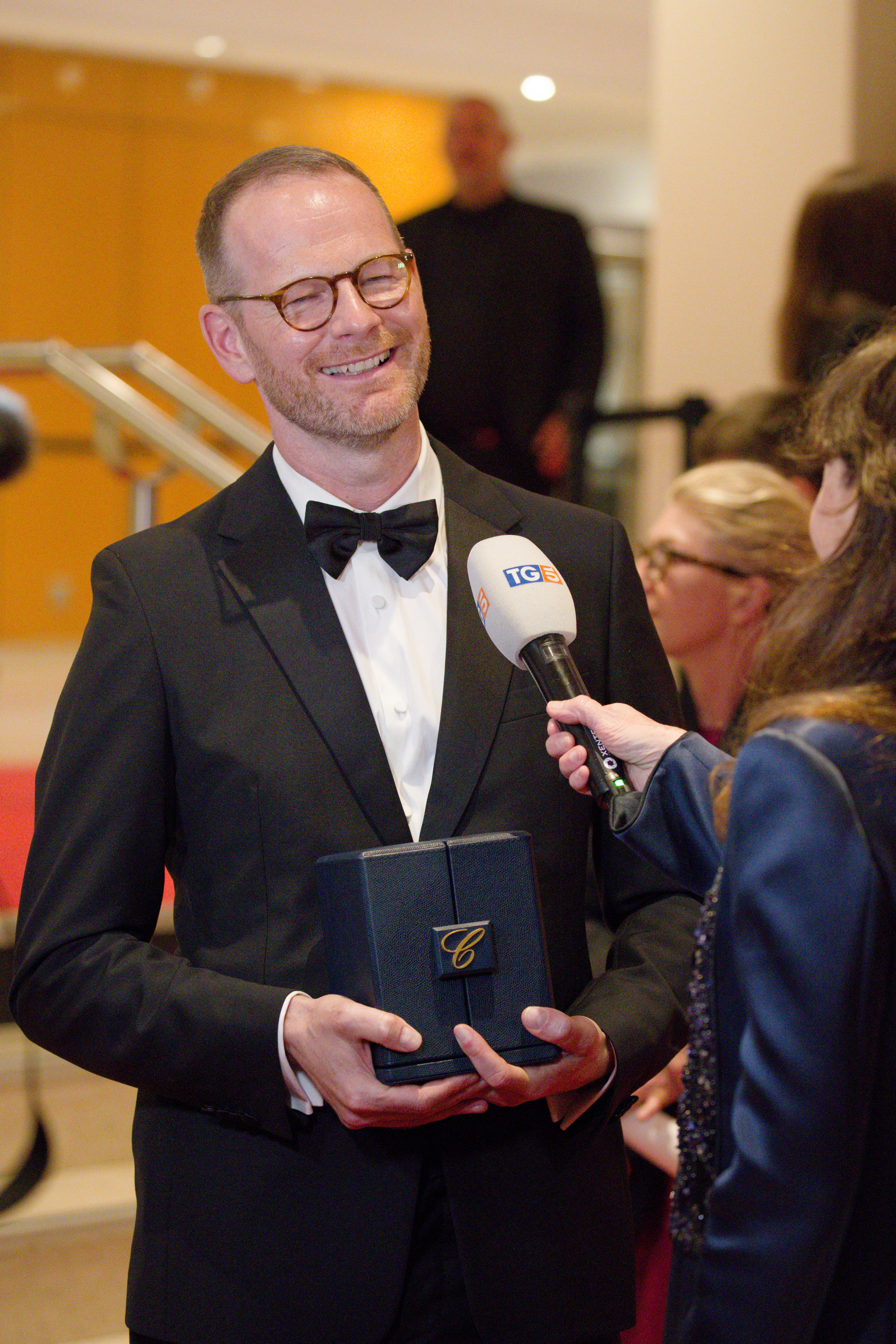
Trier with the Cannes Film Festival's Grand Prix for Sentimental Value (2025)

In 2018, together with his brother Emil, he co-directed a 55-minute documentary, The Other Munch. It covered writer Karl Ove Knausgård and museum curator Kari Brandtzæg curating Towards the Forest, an exhibition of paintings by Edvard Munch at Oslo's Munch Museum. Trier and Knausgård visit locations from Munch's life, discuss his works, themes, obsessions, and process. The Trier brothers connect Knausgård's unorthodox interpretation of Munch to Knausgård's literary works, in a portrait of both artists. Knausgård stated "When I was invited to curate the exhibition, I proposed that we make a film to coincide with it." Also in 2018, Trier served as the Jury President of the Critics' Week section at the 2018 Cannes Film Festival.

In June 2018, Trier was invited to become a member of the Academy of Motion Picture Arts and Sciences.

On 7 July 2021, The Worst Person in the World premiered to high acclaim competing for the Palme d'Or at the 2021 Cannes Film Festival, where star Renate Reinsve won the Cannes Film Festival Award for Best Actress. Jordan Mintzer of The Hollywood Reporter praised Trier's ability as a director, writing, "More than ever, Trier reveals how well he can keep shifting tones and emotional arcs without losing any narrative momentum." The film was nominated for the Academy Award for Best International Feature Film and Trier himself earned a nomination for the Academy Award for Best Original Screenplay at the 94th Academy Awards.

In 2023 it was announced that Trier would reunite with actress Renate Reinsve for his next film, Sentimental Value, a family drama that subsequently began filming in Norway. The film was screened at the 2025 Cannes Film Festival, where it won the Grand Prix. A family drama, the film revolves around the fractured relationship between two daughters and their father, a filmmaker on the rebound. It stars Reinsve, Stellan Skarsgård, Inga Ibsdotter Lilleaas and Elle Fanning. Pete Hammond of The Hollywood Reporter wrote, "This may be the closest Trier has gotten to the master of this kind of human conflict, Ingmar Bergman, whose films would seem to be an influence, or at the very least an inspiration". The film was distributed by Neon and released in the United States on 7 November 2025.

== Influences ==
In 2012, Trier participated in the Sight & Sound critics' poll where he listed his 10 favorite films in alphabetical order:

- 2001: A Space Odyssey (USA, 1968)
- 8½ (Italy, 1963)
- Annie Hall (USA, 1977)
- Bresson's entire oeuvre
- Goodfellas (USA, 1990)
- Hiroshima Mon Amour (France, 1959)
- Mirror (Soviet Union, 1974)
- La notte (Italy, 1961)
- Persona (Sweden, 1966)
- Vertigo (USA, 1958)

In 2022, Trier participated in the poll as a filmmaker, swapping in Terrence Malick's The Tree of Life (2010) for the Bresson entry.

== Personal life ==
Trier is married to Helle Bendixen Trier and has two daughters, Emma and Evie.

== Filmography ==
=== Feature film ===
Year	English Title	Original Title	Director	Writer	Executive Producer
2006	Reprise		Yes	Yes	No
2011	Oslo, August 31st	Oslo, 31. august	Yes	Yes	No
2015	Louder Than Bombs		Yes	Yes	Yes
2017	Thelma		Yes	Yes	Yes
2021	The Worst Person in the World	Verdens verste menneske	Yes	Yes	No
2025	Sentimental Value	Affeksjonsverdi	Yes	Yes	Yes

=== Documentary film ===
Year	Title	Note
2018	The Other Munch	Co-directed with Emil Trier

=== Short film ===
Year	Title	Director	Writer
2000	Pietà	Yes	Yes
2001	Still	Yes	Yes
2002	Procter	Yes	Yes

== Awards and nominations ==
Organizations	Year	Category	Work	Result	Ref.
Academy Awards	2022	Best Original Screenplay	The Worst Person in the World	Nominated	
Academy Awards	2026	Best International Feature Film	Sentimental Value	Accepted	
Academy Awards	2026	Best Original Screenplay	Sentimental Value	Nominated	
Academy Awards	2026	Best Director	Sentimental Value	Nominated	
Bodil Awards	2023	Best Non-American Film	The Worst Person in the World	Nominated	
British Academy Film Awards	2026	Best Direction	Sentimental Value	Nominated	
British Academy Film Awards	2026	Original Screenplay	Sentimental Value	Nominated	
British Academy Film Awards	2026	Best Film Not in the English Language	Sentimental Value	Won	
British Independent Film Awards	2022	Best International Independent Film	The Worst Person in the World	Won	
Cannes Film Festival	2011	Un Certain Regard	Oslo, August 31st	Nominated	
Cannes Film Festival	2015	Palme d'Or	Louder Than Bombs	Nominated	
Cannes Film Festival	2021	Palme d'Or	The Worst Person in the World	Nominated	
Cannes Film Festival	2025	Palme d'Or	Sentimental Value	Nominated	
Cannes Film Festival	2025	Grand Prix	Sentimental Value	Won	
César Awards	2013	Best Foreign Film	Oslo, August 31st	Nominated	
César Awards	2022	Best Foreign Film	The Worst Person in the World	Nominated	
Critics' Choice Movie Awards	2026	Best Director	Sentimental Value	Nominated	
Critics' Choice Movie Awards	2026	Best Original Screenplay	Sentimental Value	Nominated	
Edinburgh International Film Festival	2002	Best British Short Film	Procter	Won	
Edinburgh International Film Festival	2002	Prix UIP for Best European Short Film	Procter	Won	
European Film Awards	2002	European Short Film	Procter	Nominated	
European Film Awards	2021	European Screenwriter	The Worst Person in the World	Nominated	
European Film Awards	2026	European Film	Sentimental Value	Won	
European Film Awards	2026	European Director	Sentimental Value	Won	
European Film Awards	2026	European Screenwriter	Sentimental Value	Won	
European Film Awards	2026	LUX Audience Award	Sentimental Value	Nominated	
Golden Globe Awards	2025	Best Director	Sentimental Value	Nominated	
Golden Globe Awards	2025	Best Screenplay	Sentimental Value	Nominated	
Gotham Awards	2021	Best International Feature	The Worst Person in the World	Nominated	
Lumière Awards	2022	Best International Co-Production	The Worst Person in the World	Won	
New York Film Critics Circle	2008	Best First Film	Reprise	Nominated	
Norwegian International Film Festival	2017	Norwegian Film Critics Award	Thelma	Won	
Reykjavík International Film Festival	2021	Creative Excellence In Cinema Award	—N/a	Honored	
Robert Awards	2023	Best Non-English Language Film	The Worst Person in the World	Won	
Stockholm International Film Festival	2011	Bronze Horse	Oslo, August 31st	Won	
Stockholm International Film Festival	2015	Bronze Horse	Louder Than Bombs	Won	
Toronto International Film Festival	2006	Discovery Award	Reprise	Won	
Toronto International Film Festival	2025	International People's Choice Award	Sentimental Value	Runner-up	

Directed Academy Award performances
Under Trier's direction, these actors have received Academy Award nominations for their performances in their respective roles.

Year	Performer	Film	Result
Academy Award for Best Actress
2025	Renate Reinsve	Sentimental Value	Nominated
Academy Award for Best Supporting Actor
2025	Stellan Skarsgård	Sentimental Value	Nominated
Academy Award for Best Supporting Actress
2025	Elle Fanning	Sentimental Value	Nominated
2025	Inga Ibsdotter Lilleaas	Sentimental Value	Nominated

== See also ==
- List of Nordic Academy Award winners and nominees
