= Procter (film) =

- Directed by: Joachim Trier
- Written by: Joachim Trier; Eskil Vogt
- Produced by: Marie Farquharson
- Starring: John Joyce; Michael Hucks
- Cinematography: Jakob Ihre
- Edited by: Helle le Fevre
- Music by: Graham Slack
- Release date: 30 August 2002
- Running time: 18 minutes
- Countries: United Kingdom; Norway
- Language: English

Procter is a 2002 British-Norwegian short film directed by Joachim Trier, starring John Joyce and Michael Hucks. It tells the story of a man who finds a video tape depicting a mysterious suicide and tries to figure out what happened.

== Plot ==
Charles Procter shaves and goes to work. He spills coffee in his lap and goes home to change clothes. In the garage, he finds a car on fire with a dead man inside. Nearby is a video camera on a tripod, which Procter takes and brings home. The video depicts a man who goes through his morning routine, briefly meets a girl with a dog, pours petrol on the car and himself, steps into the car and lights himself on fire.

Procter rewatches the video several times. The police turns up and asks about the incident. The dead man had lived a few floors above him. His name was Paul Ferguson. Procter does not mention the video to the police.

Procter goes to the park where the girl from the video had been seen. He eventually sees the girl walk by and figures out where she lives. He rings on the door and claims to be from the police. The girl did not know the man. She has the dog, which the man had asked her to look after, without returning.

Procter keeps watching the video. He leaves his home. The video is frozen toward the end where Procter is seen looking into the camera.

== Cast ==
- John Joyce as Charles Procter
- Michael Hucks as Paul Ferguson
- Zoe Thorne as girl
- Ray Eves as policeman 1
- Derek Hutchinson as policeman 2

== Production ==
The film was made just after Joachim Trier had graduated from the National Film and Television School. A group of students from the year below him had been granted funding for their graduation film and asked Trier to direct it. Trier agreed on the condition that he was allowed to write the script from scratch together with Eskil Vogt. The film was made quickly, which Trier appreciated, since it forced him to trust his instincts. The most demanding scene was the car fire.

According to Trier, Procter was the film where he established his personal style. He had previously experimented with different aesthetics, but the simple story and production led him to a style with which he was more comfortable. It was also his first collaboration with the cinematographer Jakob Ihre, with whom he went on to make several more films.

== Reception ==
=== Critical response ===
Ellen Margrethe Sand of Verdens Gang described the film as "a densified and unsettling drama". Sand continued: "Trier utilises the scarcely allotted time and his film medium to the last drop. Without an image, even less a word - too much".

=== Accolades ===
The film won the prize for Best British Short and the UIP Prize at the Edinburgh International Film Festival; the latter meant that it was nominated for the European Film Award for Best Short Film. In Norway it was nominated for the Amanda Award for Best Short Film.
