= Stian Kristiansen =

Stian Kristiansen may refer to:

- Stian Kristiansen (film director), Norwegian film director
- Stian Kristiansen (footballer)
