= Returning Home =

Returning Home may refer to:

- Returning Home (1975 film), an American television film directed by Daniel Petrie,
- Returning Home (2011 film), a Ugandan documentary film by Matt Bish,
- Returning Home (2015 film) (Å vende tilbake), a Norwegian drama film by Henrik Martin Dahlsbakken,
- Returning Home (2021 film), a Canadian documentary film by Sean Stiller.
