= Stian Kristiansen (film director) =

Norwegian film director

Stian Kristiansen (born 9 August 1972) is a Norwegian film director.

Born in Stavanger, he was educated at Stavanger University College as well as Lillehammer University College's film institute. For the film The Man Who Loved Yngve, Kristiansen won three Amanda Awards for Best Film, Best Youth Film and Best Direction. Kristiansen followed up this adaption of a Tore Renberg novel with other adaptations of Renberg's work, I Travel Alone (2011) and Videogutten (2013, a short film based on Renberg's novella). Kristiansen also directed the youth movie Kiss Me You Fucking Moron (2013). He directed five episodes of Stayer (2024).

== Personal life ==
In 2019 in Sola Municipality he married actress Eili Harboe, 22 years his junior.
