= Jeppe Beck Laursen =

Norwegian actor (born 1972)

Jeppe Svend Aage Beck Laursen (born 1 June 1972) is a Norwegian actor and stuntman. He is most famous for his role as Hæsten in the historical TV drama The Last Kingdom.

== Filmography ==
- Vigil (TV series, 2026)
- Stayer (TV series, 2024)
- Ragnarök (2023) - Radio host
- The Last Kingdom: Seven Kings Must Die (2023)
- 24 Hr Sunshine (2023)
- Folk og røvere i Kardemomme by (2022)
- Downs Of The Dead (2019)
- Rekyl / Recoil (2018) TV series
- The Last Kingdom (2017–2022)
- Vaiana (norsk stemme Maui) (2016)
- Birkebeinerne (2016)
- Kill Buljo 2 (2013)
- Hansel and Gretel: Witch Hunters (2013)
- Hotel Cæsar (2013)
- Labyrint (tv-series, 2012–2018)
- Tomme Tønner 2 (2011)
- Brødrene Dal og Vikingsverdets Forbannelse (2010)
- Kurt Josef Wagle og legenden om fjordheksa (2010)
- En helt vanlig dag på jobben (2010)
- Snarveien (2009)
- Død snø (2009)
- Hvaler (2008)
- Rovdyr (2008)
- Varg Veum – Tornerose (2008)
- Kalde føtter (2006)
- Ungkarsnissen (2004)
- Hotel Cæsar Season 16, episode 40, "Narkokurer" (2004)
- Verdens beste SFO
- Kule kidz gråter ikke
- For dagene er onde (1991)
