= The Quake (film) =

- Theatrical release poster
- Directed by: John Andreas Andersen
- Written by: John Kåre Raake; Harald Rosenløw-Eeg
- Produced by: Are Heidenstorm
- Starring: Kristoffer Joner; Ane Dahl Torp; Jonas Hoff Oftebro; Edith Haagenrud-Sande; Kathrine Thorborg Johansen
- Cinematography: John Christian Rosenlund
- Edited by: Christian Siebenherz
- Music by: Johannes Ringen; Johan Söderqvist
- Production company: Film Väst
- Distributed by: Nordisk Filmdistribusjon
- Release date: 31 August 2018
- Running time: 106 minutes
- Country: Norway
- Language: Norwegian
- Budget: €6 million
- Box office: $13.8 million

The Quake (Norwegian: Skjelvet) is a 2018 Norwegian disaster film directed by John Andreas Andersen. It is the sequel to The Wave and was released in Norwegian theaters on 31 August 2018.

== Plot ==
Geologist Kristian Eikjord is hailed a hero for his actions during the tsunami in Geiranger. Three years later, his wife Idun is divorcing him and he is separated from his children, Sondre and Julia. Kristian lives in seclusion in the mostly-rebuilt Geiranger, while his family moves to Oslo, where Idun works at the Radisson Blu Plaza Hotel. Kristian feels responsible for the 250 fatalities of the tsunami and keeps a secret room in his house dedicated to the events and the fatalities, which causes strain with his family.

Kristian learns of the death of fellow geologist Konrad Lindblom in a collapse in the Oslofjord Tunnel, and travels to Oslo to investigate the circumstances of his death, where he meets with Konrad's supervisor, Johannes Løberg. Johannes reassures Kristian that the seismic activity that Konrad was worried about was merely construction blasting being done across the city and that there is nothing to be concerned about, but Kristian doubts his claims. Kristian visits Konrad's house, where he meets Konrad's daughter Marit and discovers Konrad's research, including core samples and a map that has recorded serious seismic activity. He calls Johannes about this, but Johannes downplays his concerns.

Kristian visits Idun, meets Sondre and his girlfriend, and is invited to Julia's ballet recital. The next day, Kristian finds more concerning research in Konrad's house and goes to the Oslofjord Tunnel, where he discovers a core sample Konrad was attempting to recover. While traveling back to Oslo, Kristian accidentally snaps the core sample, and realizes that the earth underneath Oslo is unusually weak. Suddenly, a seismic rift destroys the Oslo Opera House where Julia is doing her recital; Idun safely gets Julia out of the building. That night, Kristian visits Idun to apologize for missing the recital and breaks down. They embrace as Kristian cries, and the couple spends the night together.

The next morning, when Idun leaves for work and Sondre goes to University of Oslo, Marit discovers a video on her father's computer. The video shows that Konrad was using rats to investigate his theories, and that those rats had died from exposure to toxic gas; Kristian concludes that a major earthquake, up to 8.5 on the Richter scale, will strike Oslo, and that the collapse that killed Konrad was merely an omen. Kristian, Marit, and Julia rush to the Radisson Blu to warn Idun. On the way, Kristian calls Sondre to warn him, but Sondre, who is in class, ignores his calls. Kristian calls in a fake bomb threat to evacuate the university, and Sondre is convinced that they must leave after the evacuation alarm goes off.

Arriving at the hotel, Kristian finds Idun on the 34th floor, convinces her to go downstairs with him, and pulls the fire alarm to get everyone else to evacuate before getting on an elevator with Idun. Julia wanders into the building to find her father, with Marit in pursuit. Marit ascends the stairs and grabs Julia just as the earthquake hits, devastating the city. The elevator Kristian and Idun are in plummets toward the ground but is stopped violently. After coming to, Kristian and Idun make their way out of the stuck elevator and climb maintenance ladders to get to the top floor of the elevator shaft. Debris knocked loose by aftershocks fall down the shaft and mutilate Idun's leg, forcing Kristian to carry her.

They arrive at an open elevator door near the 30th story and attempt to use a severed elevator cord to swing across to the opening. Kristian succeeds, but Idun falls to her death after the power goes out and the brakes on the elevator above fail. Kristian heads to the place where he last saw Julia and finds her and Marit huddling behind a mounted bar. As they are attempting to leave, a final aftershock causes Julia to lose her grip, and she slides down the floor; Kristian jumps after her and pushes her out of the way, but knocks himself out in the process. When he comes to, he finds Julia on a cracking window. Kristian and Marit rescue Julia before the window breaks, and they escape the hotel.

After the earthquake, Marit enters Konrad's office to find it mostly destroyed, except for a picture of her as a child with her father. Kristian, Julia, and Sondre arrive at their old home in Geiranger. Descriptions at the end explain that Norway has the most seismic activity north of the Alps, and that a major earthquake is expected to hit Norway in the coming future.

== Cast ==
- Kristoffer Joner as Kristian Eikjord, a 44-year old experienced geologist
- Ane Dahl Torp as Idun Eikjord, Kristian's wife
- Jonas Hoff Oftebro as Sondre Eikjord, Kristian's 20-year-old son
- Edith Haagenrud-Sande as Julia Eikjord, Kristian's 11-year-old daughter
- Kathrine Thorborg Johansen as Marit Lindblom

== Response ==
=== Box office ===
The Quake grossed $6.235 million in the United States and Canada and $14 million in other territories for a worldwide total of 20,235 million, plus $374,237 with home video sales.

=== Critical reception ===
On review aggregator Rotten Tomatoes, the film holds an approval rating of 85% based on 40 reviews, with an average rating of 6.8/10. The website's critical consensus reads, "A satisfyingly smart action thriller, The Quake delivers plenty of nail-biting tension without sacrificing character development or common sense." On Metacritic, the film holds a rating of 70 out of 100, based on 11 critics, indicating "generally favorable reviews".

At the 2019 Amanda Awards, the film received The People’s Amanda and the award for Best Visual Effects. In addition, the film was also nominated in the categories of Best Norwegian Film in Theatrical Release and Best Production Direction/Scenography.
