= Ingar Helge Gimle =

Norwegian actor (born 1956)

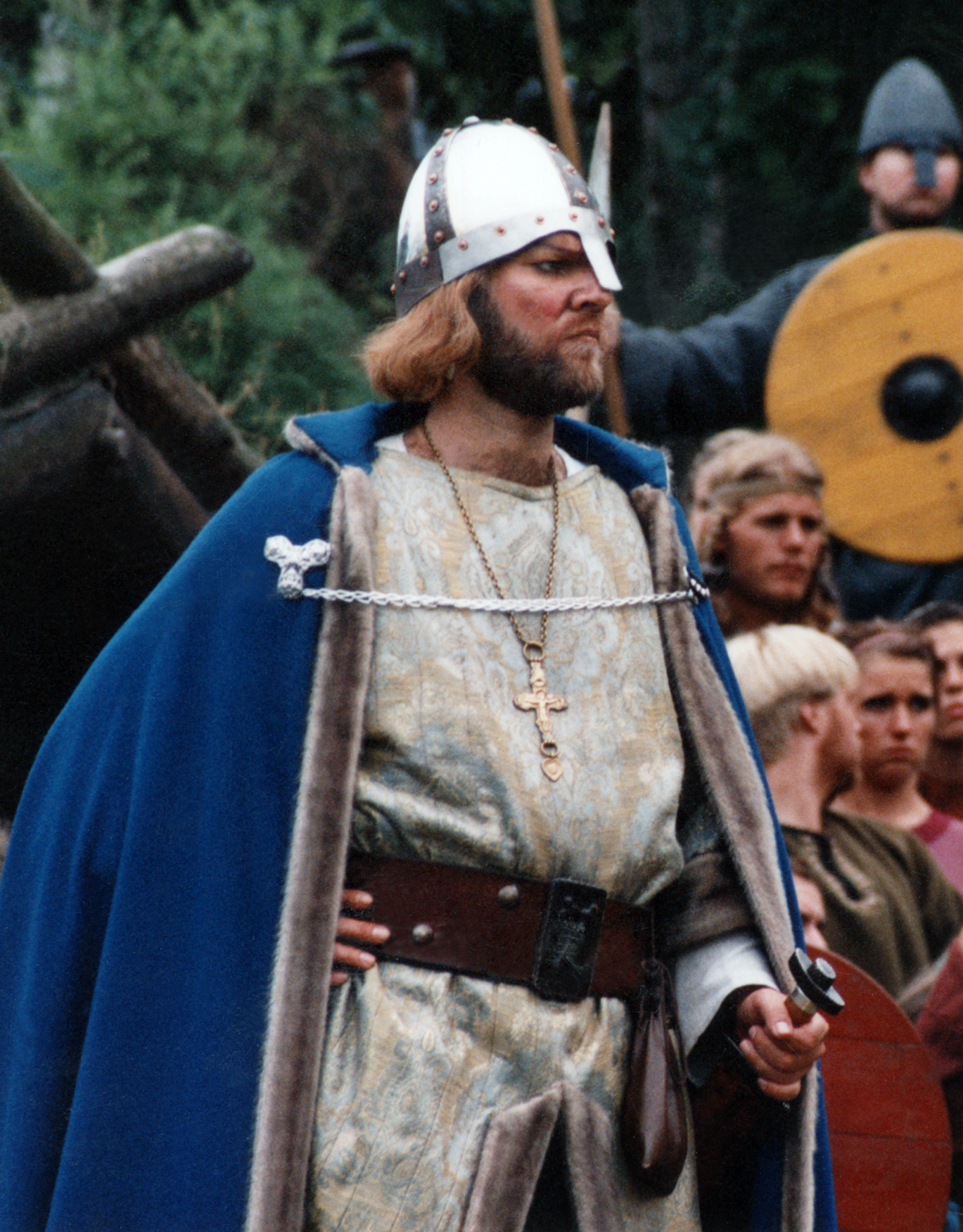
- Gimle in 1994
- Born: 28 September 1956 (age 69); Oslo, Norway
- Occupation: Actor

Ingar Helge Gimle (born 28 September 1956) is a Norwegian actor. Born in Oslo, he made his stage debut at Trøndelag Teater in 1985. He was employed at Oslo Nye Teater from 1989 and at the National Theatre of Norway from 1996.

For his stage work, he won a Komiprisen in 2009 and a Hedda Award in 2013. For the screen, he has won Amanda Awards in 1999, 2010, and 2018.

== Selected filmography ==
=== Film ===
List of film appearances, with year, title, and role shown
Year	Title	Role	Notes
1980	Belønningen	police officer	
1991	Buicken – store gutter gråter ikke	Vibe	
1993	De blå ulvene		
1994	Ti kniver i hjertet	Gregers	
1998	Bloody Angels	Raymond Hartmann	
1999	Absolute Hangover	Jon	
1999	Sophie's World	Herr Johnsen	
2002	Hold My Heart	Bjørn Bakke	
2002	I Am Dina	prison guard	
2006	Uro	Makker	
2007	Gone with the Woman	Halfred	
2008	Cold Lunch	Gunnar	
2008	Ulvenatten	Aksel Schjeldrup	
2010	En helt vanlig dag på jobben	Sven O. Høiby	
2011	People in the Sun	Svein	
2013	Victoria	landowner	
2014	Dead Snow: Red vs. Dead	Doctor Brochman	
2015	Returning Home	Einar	

=== Television ===
List of television appearances, with year, title, and role shown
Year	Title	Role	Notes
1994–95	I de beste familier	Magne Asbjørnsen	20 episodes
1996	Chez toi	Randulf Svigersen	6 episodes
2000	Sejer – Se deg ikke tilbake	Karlsen	4 episodes
2000	Sophie's World	Herr Johnsen	3 episodes
2000–02	Hotel Cæsar	Arne Marcussen	309 episodes
2004–07	Seks som oss	Egil	15 episodes
2005	Ran	Roy	4 episodes
2006	Etaten	Rune	8 episodes
2007	Willy Nilsen på camping	army dad	4 episodes
2007	Luftens helter	Karl Åge Tørrkle	8 episodes
2007	Thomas P.	Erling	8 episodes
2008–10	Hvaler	Trygve Eriksen	22 episodes
2012	NAV	Rune	10 episodes
2014	MK-X	Konrad	8 episodes
2014	The Third Eye	Due	10 episodes
2015–16	Frikjent	William Hansteen	18 episodes
2016	Mammon	Erik Ulrichsen	8 episodes
2016–17	Norsemen	nomad leader	12 episodes
2018	Rekyl	Harald Wold	3 episodes
2019	Beforeigners	Axel	3 episodes
2020	Livstid	Christopher "KIT" Lange	7 episodes
2021–22	Hvite gutter	Tom	3 episodes
2021–23	Kø		3 episodes
2022	The Lørenskog Disappearance	Reidar Lakke Jr.	3 episodes
2024	Stayer	Jimmy Henriksen	4 episodes
2026	Jo Nesbø's Detective Hole		Upcoming
