= Kiss Me You Fucking Moron =

- Film poster
- Norwegian: Kyss meg for faen i helvete
- Directed by: Stian Kristiansen
- Starring: Eili Harboe; Øyvind Larsen Runestad
- Release date: 9 August 2013
- Running time: 90 minutes
- Country: Norway
- Language: Norwegian

Kiss Me You Fucking Moron (Norwegian: Kyss meg for faen i helvete) is a 2013 Norwegian comedy film directed by Stian Kristiansen.

== Plot ==
Tale is a 17-year-old who leads a small amateur theater group of teenagers. They decide to perform Dream of Autumn, a play by Norwegian playwright Jon Fosse. Tale asks Lars, a respected actor going through a personal crisis, to help direct the production.

Lars agrees under certain conditions and casts Vegard, the local football team's captain, in a leading role despite his lack of acting experience. The group soon faces problems with their new instructor, while Tale develops romantic feelings for Vegard.

== Cast ==
- Eili Harboe as Tale
- Øyvind Larsen Runestad as Vegard
- Kristoffer Joner as Lars
- Rolf Kristian Larsen as Jakob
- Enja Henriksen as Emma
