= Returning Home (2015 film) =

2015 Norwegian drama film

- Film poster
- Directed by: Henrik Martin Dahlsbakken
- Written by: Henrik Martin Dahlsbakken
- Starring: Åsmund Høeg; Ingar Helge Gimle
- Release date: 27 February 2015
- Running time: 75 minutes
- Country: Norway
- Language: Norwegian

Returning Home (Norwegian: Å vende tilbake) is a 2015 Norwegian drama film directed by Henrik Martin Dahlsbakken. It was one of three films shortlisted by Norway to be their submission for the Academy Award for Best Foreign Language Film at the 88th Academy Awards, but it lost out to The Wave.

The film received several reviews with "die throws" of 4 in Dagsavisen, Bergensavisen, and 3 in VG, Aftenposten, and Dagbladet.

Å vende tilbake was previously the Norwegian title of Pedro Almodóvar's film Volver.

== Cast ==
- Åsmund Høeg as Oscar
- Fredrik Grøndahl as Fredrik
- Ingar Helge Gimle as Einar
- Lia Boysen as Anna
- Isabel Christine Andreasen as Mari
