= The Wave (2015 film) =

2015 Norwegian disaster film by Roar Uthaug

- Theatrical release poster
- Directed by: Roar Uthaug
- Written by: John Kåre Raake; Harald Rosenløw-Eeg
- Produced by: Are Heidenstorm
- Starring: Kristoffer Joner; Ane Dahl Torp; Jonas Hoff Oftebro; Edith Haagenrud-Sande
- Cinematography: John Christian Rosenlund
- Edited by: Christian Siebenherz
- Music by: Magnus Beite
- Production company: Film Väst
- Distributed by: Nordisk Filmdistribusjon; Magnolia Pictures Fantefilm
- Release date: 28 August 2015
- Running time: 105 minutes
- Country: Norway
- Language: Norwegian
- Budget: $6 million
- Box office: $12.8 million

The Wave (Norwegian: Bølgen) is a 2015 Norwegian disaster film directed by Roar Uthaug. It was Norway's official submission for the Academy Award for Best Foreign Language Film at the 88th Academy Awards but failed to be nominated. The movie depicts the Åkerneset crevice collapsing in Møre og Romsdal, creating an avalanche resulting in an 80-metre (260 ft) tall tsunami that destroys everything in its path. A sequel titled The Quake (Norwegian: Skjelvet), directed by John Andreas Andersen, was released on 31 August 2018.

== Plot ==
Geologist Kristian Eikjord is working his final day in Geiranger before moving to Stavanger with his family, when sensors in the mountain indicate groundwater has disappeared at Åkerneset.

Waiting for the ferry with his children, Sondre and Julia, while his wife Idun works a few more days at the town hotel, Kristian has an epiphany and rushes back to the geology center, leaving his children in the car. He and his coworker Jacob investigate the crevice and find that the sensor wires have snapped due to movements inside the mountain. Kristian's former boss Arvid agrees to enter a higher state of alert but does not sound the evacuation alarm to not disrupt the tourist season. Kristian returns to the car hours later, but finds that the children have gone to the hotel. Kristian and Julia separated with Idun and Sondre as Julia wanted to spend one last night at their house. In the evening, Sondre heads down to the basement with his headphones and skateboard.

Arvid and Jacob went down to the crevice to investigate the abnormal readings. Kristian reviews records of previous avalanches that suggest the readings indicate an upcoming avalanche. He calls the station and orders them to sound the alarm for the residents of Geiranger. Jacob's foot becomes trapped as the avalanche occurs. Arvid sacrifices himself to save Jacob, and the alarm is sounded shortly before the rockslide crashes into the fjord, creating a megatsunami expected to hit Geiranger in ten minutes.

Idun and her colleague Vibeke evacuate the hotel guests onto a bus, while Kristian takes Julia and drives uphill to Ørnevegen, before getting stuck in traffic. Realizing his altitude is too low, he abandons the car and takes Julia on foot, shouting for others to run. Their neighbor Anna's leg is trapped by a car, and Kristian attempts to free her, sending Julia to Ørnevegen with Anna's husband, Thomas, and daughter, Teresa. Seeing the tsunami approach and out of time, Kristian seats himself and Anna in a van before the tsunami engulfs the vehicle.

Meanwhile, Idun realizes Sondre is missing and refuses to leave without him. A Danish tourist, Maria, helps her search despite the objections of her husband, Philip. They find Sondre, but as they return to the lobby, they see that the bus is gone and the tsunami has reached Geiranger. They rush back downstairs to the basement's bomb shelter as they are chased by water. Maria was washed away while the rest hid in the bomb shelter.

Kristian survives but finds Anna dead impaled by debris. He walks up to Ørnevegen and finds Julia alive, leaving her with Thomas and Teresa while he heads back to Geiranger to find Idun and Sondre. In the now devastated town, Kristian quickly finds the destroyed evacuation bus full of dead passengers, including Vibeke but not Idun and Sondre, and he starts moving towards the hotel. Down in the bomb shelter, the water level rises, and they are unable to open the door, as it is blocked by debris. Philip, panicking to breathe, pushes Sondre underwater, but Idun drowns him to save her son.

Kristian finds Sondre's backpack and concludes that Idun and Sondre are dead. In his grief, he vented by hitting the walls. Idun and Sondre hears him, and respond by banging on the pipes. As Kristian hears them, he dives into the basement, removes the debris, and reunites with Idun, sends Sondre out, but runs out of air. Idun retrieves him and attempts rescue breathing, then CPR. She finally accepts that Kristian has drowned and stops trying. Sondre, however gives one last effort, and he manages to revive Kristian.

The entire family is reunited at Ørnevegen, while a pan-away camera shot shows that Geiranger has been leveled to the ground.

== Cast ==
- Kristoffer Joner as Kristian Eikjord, a 40-year-old experienced geologist
- Ane Dahl Torp as Idun Karlsen, Kristian's wife
- Jonas Hoff Oftebro as Sondre, Kristian's son
- Edith Haagenrud-Sande as Julia, Kristian's daughter
- Thomas Bo Larsen as Phillip Poulsen, a Danish tourist
- Mette Horn as Maria Poulsen, Phillip's wife
- Fridtjov Såheim as Arvid Øvrebø, Kristian's former boss
- Herman Bernhoft as Georg
- Arthur Berning as Jacob Vikra
- Silje Breivik as Anna, one of Eikjord's neighbours
- Laila Goody as Margot Valldal, Arvid's assistant
- Eili Harboe as Vibeke, Idun's hotel colleague

== Production ==
=== Development ===
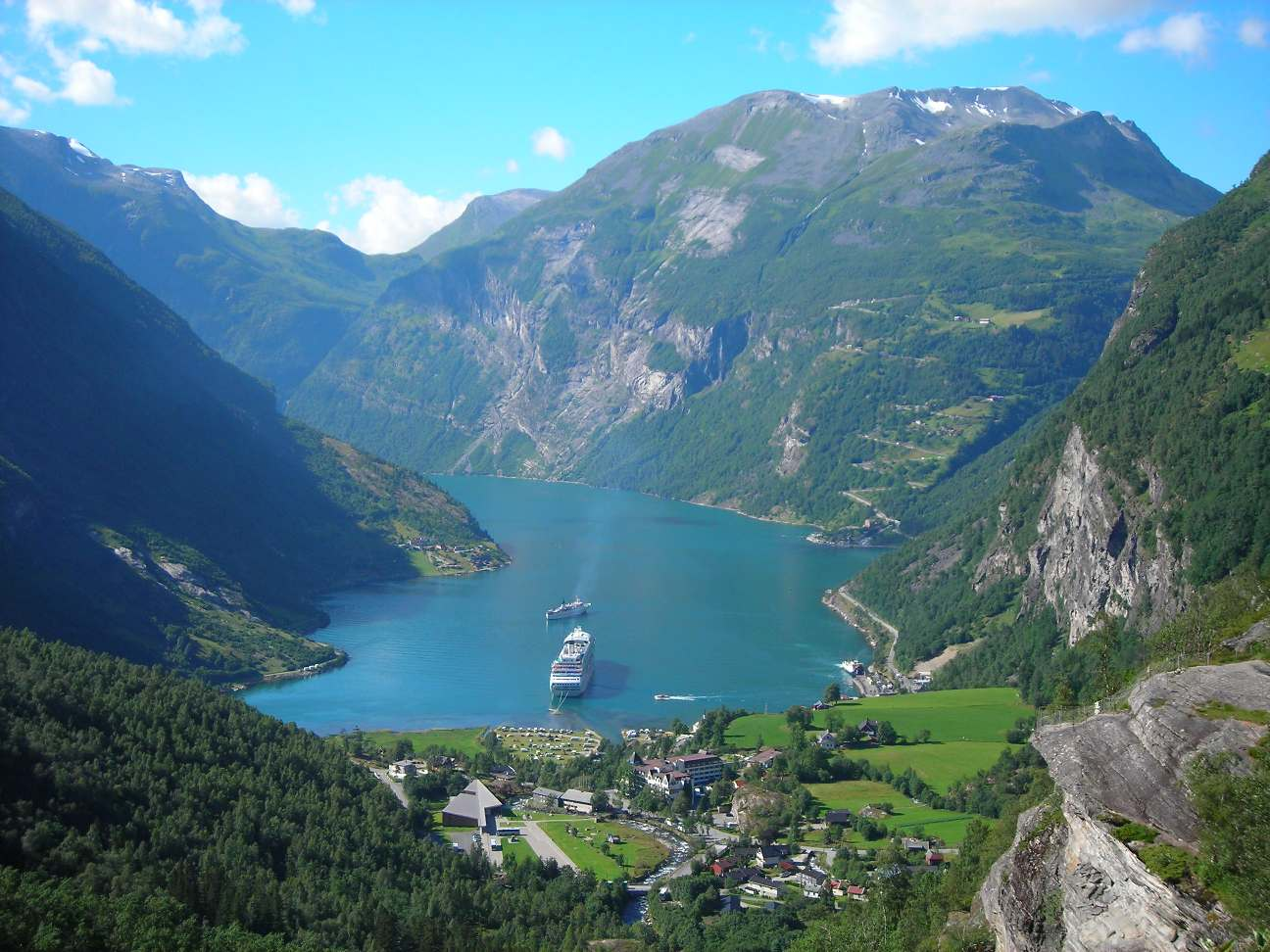
Filming took place in Geiranger, a small tourist town just below Åkerneset.

Norway is a rockslide prone area (created by the Caledonian orogeny) and The Wave is based on a rock-slide tsunami incident which destroyed the village of Tafjord on 7 April 1934, killing 40 people. Uthaug was a fan of Hollywood disaster films such as Twister and Armageddon and had long wanted to make a disaster film in Norway. According to him the challenge was to combine the elements of the American genre film with the reality of the situation in Norway.

== Release ==
The Wave had its international premiere at the 2015 Toronto International Film Festival on 16 September 2015.

=== Box office ===
The film sold around 800,000 tickets in Norway, and grossed a total of US$8.2 million at the Norwegian box office becoming the highest-grossing film of 2015 in Norway.

=== Awards and accolades ===
At the 2016 Amanda Awards, The Wave received the award for Best Norwegian Film in Theatrical Release, as well as the awards for Best Sound Design and Best Visual Effects. In addition, the film was also nominated in the categories of Best Norwegian Film, Best Director, Best Cinematography, and Best Music.

At the Kanon Awards for 2016, The Wave won for Best Male Actor in a Leading Role (Kristoffer Joner), Best Producer, Best Editing, and Best Production Design (Lina Nordqvist).

== Critical reception ==
The film received positive reviews from critics, with praise aimed at the performances of the cast (mostly the two protagonists), cinematography, score and visual effects. Deborah Young of The Hollywood Reporter called the film "an exotic edge-of-seater [that] plays on the beauty and terror of nature" and "a thrilling ride", while chief international film critic Peter Debruge of Variety described it as "an equally impressive tsunami-peril thriller."

The review aggregator website Rotten Tomatoes reported that 83% of critics have given the film a positive review based on 108 reviews, with an average rating of 6.64/10. The site's critics consensus states: "Well-acted and blessed with a refreshingly humanistic focus, The Wave is a disaster film that makes uncommonly smart use of disaster film clichés." Metacritic reports a weighted average score of 68 out of 100 based on 26 critics, indicating "generally favorable reviews".

Deborah Young of The Hollywood Reporter called them "convincingly terrifying and involving." Collider reviewed, "...a major technical achievement that will hopefully make Hollywood reconsider the tendency to go bigger and bigger to the point of excess."

Kelli Marchman of HorrorFuel.com wrote of theEnglish-language audio dub that "the voice-over was horrid. The timing was off, and the character's voices were emotionless. It sounded like the lines were being read off of a script by a robot, with no concern of how the characters came across" before recommending the movie only in its original Norwegian.

== See also ==
- List of submissions to the 88th Academy Awards for Best Foreign Language Film
- List of Norwegian submissions for the Academy Award for Best Foreign Language Film
