= Norwegian International Film Festival =

Film festival held in Haugesund, Norway

Coordinates: 59°24′56″N 5°16′03″E

The Norwegian International Film Festival
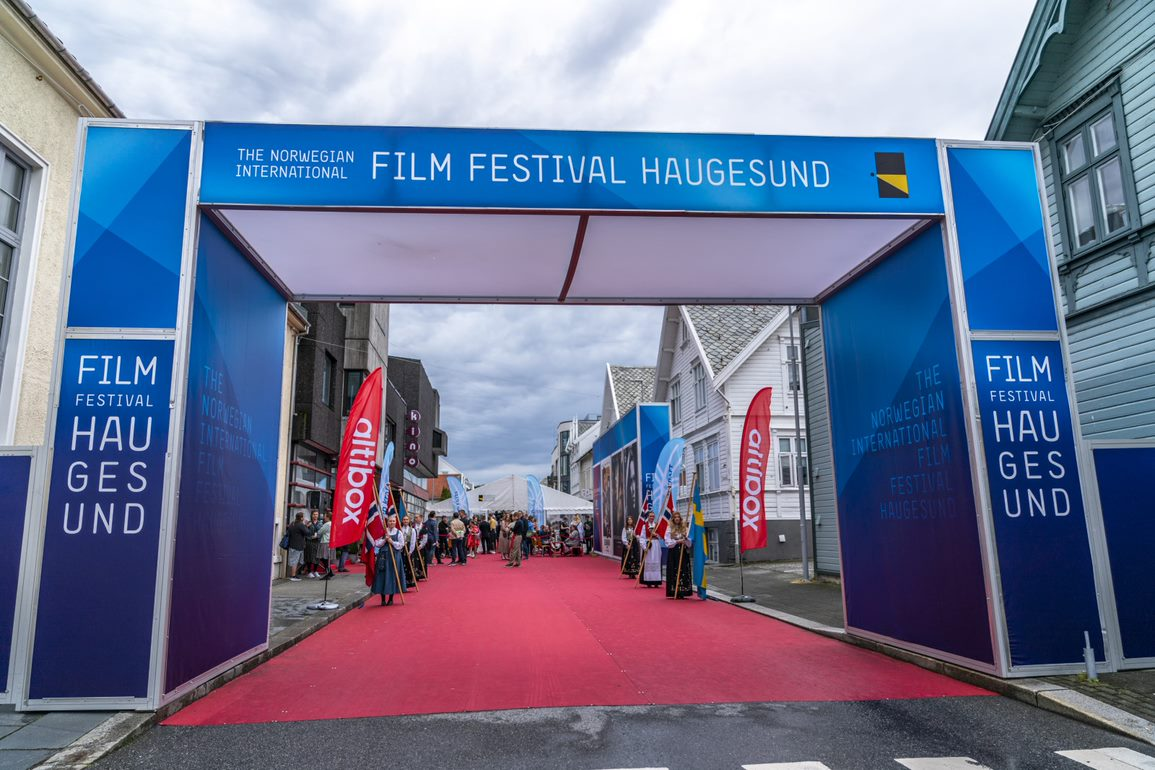
- Location: Haugesund, Norway
- Founded: 1973; 53 years ago
- Most recent: 2024
- Awards: Amanda Award
- Directors: Tonje Hardersen
- Hosted by: The Norwegian Film Festival Board
- Festival date: Opening: 16 August 2025; Closing: 22 August 2025
- Website: www.filmfestivalen.no

Current: 53rd
- 54th 52nd

The Norwegian International Film Festival (Norwegian: Den norske filmfestivalen or Filmfestivalen i Haugesund) is a film festival held annually in Haugesund, Norway. The festival goes back to 1973 and is therefore the oldest one in Norway.

In 1985, the Amanda award was instituted. The Amanda is awarded every year at the festival in different movie categories. In the beginning it was an award for both film and television, but since 2005 it has been a mere film award. In the first 20 years, the award ceremony – with the exception of Nordic Amanda in 1993 – was a collaboration between The Norwegian Film Festival and NRK.

The award is a sculpture by the Norwegian sculptor Kristian Kvakland, measuring 30 cm (12") and weighing 2.5 kg (5.5 lb).

== Festival editions ==
- The 53rd edition of the festival was held from 16 to 22 August 2025.
- The 54th edition of the festival was held from 22 to 28 August 2026.
- The 55th edition of the festival will be held from 21 to 27 August 2027.

== Awards ==
- Haugesund Walk of Fame:

This is award in the form of granite blocks laid in Haugesund's Haraldsgata, given out during the Norwegian Film Festival in Haugesund. This event will takes place on the opening day.

Recipients:

  - 2015: Ane Dahl Torp and Kristoffer Joner
  - 2016: Jakob Oftebro and Liv Ullmann
  - 2017: Pia Tjelta and Bjørn Sundquist
  - 2018: Agnes Kittelsen and Toralv Maurstad
  - 2019: Anne Marit Jacobsen and Aksel Hennie
  - 2020: Sven Nordin and Ingrid Bolsø Berdal
  - 2021: Anders Baasmo and Andrea Bræin Hovig
  - 2022: Marie Blokhus, Bjørn Floberg, Pål Sverre Hagen and Anneke von der Lippe
  - 2023: Ine Marie Wilmann and Ingar Helge Gimle
  - 2024: Renate Reinsve and Nils Ole Oftebro
  - 2025: Lise Fjeldstad and Thorbjørn Harr
  - 2026: Anne Marie Ottersen and Anders Danielsen Lie

=== Awards given to films in the main programme of the Norwegian International Film Festival ===
- The Norwegian Critics Award
- The Ray of Sunshine
- The Audience Award (diploma)
- The Norwegian International Film Festival and Liv Ullmann’s Honorary Award
- Next Nordic Generation Award (diploma): The award includes a monetary prize of 20,000 NOK
- Best Project Award (diploma)

== See also ==
- List of Amanda Award winners
- Morten Qvale, Norwegian fashion photographer
