= Arne Torp =

Norwegian academic

Arne Torp (born 14 October 1942 in Holt Municipality in Aust-Agder county, Norway) is a Norwegian professor of North Germanic languages in the Department of Linguistics and Scandinavian Studies at the University of Oslo.

Torp has published widely, both for the higher education sector and for high school. Arne Torp was for years a member of the Norwegian Language Council and has participated in several radio and television programs in discussion of Nordic linguistics and the Norwegian language in particular.

Arne Torp is the father of actress Ane Dahl Torp. He resides at Jar.

In 2008, Arne Torp participated in a series of radio commercials for the grocery chain Joker, where he used his knowledge of Norwegian dialects to discern the geographic origin of speakers.

Arne Torp was the leader of the 'Landslaget for språklig samling' (Norwegian: National Association for a Common Language) from 1989 to 1993. From 1993 to 2003, he was editor of the magazine-language collection.
