= Arne Berggren =

Norwegian writer and musician

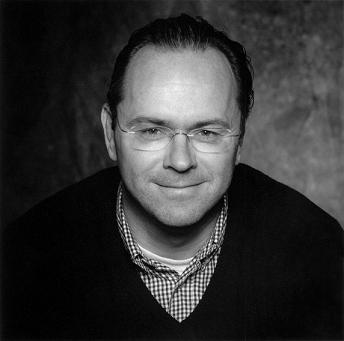
- Berggren portrait by Aschehoug
- Born: 26 October 1960 (age 65); Oslo, Norway
- Occupations: Songwriter, novelist, children's writer, rock musician

Arne Berggren (born 26 October 1960) is a Norwegian novelist, children's writer, songwriter and rock musician. He made his literary debut in 1991. In 1992 he published Stillemannen, which was awarded the Critics Prize for the year's best children's or youth's literature. Among his novels are Instamatic from 1994 and Webers lov from 1998.

Øystein Rottem characterizes Berggren's writing style as laidback, with elements of black humour. His books for children and young adults treat themes such as young love, eroticism and jealousy. Berggren established a film production hub, Shuuto Arctic, at FilmCamp Nord, a former military base in Målselv Municipality. Shuuto Arctic's first production was The River (2017) and was followed by Outlier (2020).

== Works ==
- Hvaler (2008, 2010)
- Outlier (2020)
