= Eili Harboe =

Norwegian actress (born 1994)

- Born: 16 August 1994 (age 32); Stavanger, Norway
- Occupation: Actress

Eili Harboe (born 16 August 1994) is a Norwegian actress. She was born in Stavanger. She starred in Joachim Trier's 2017 film Thelma (as the principal character Thelma). Thelma and Harboe's performance received good reviews in the Norwegian press.

On 25 November 2017, she was awarded the Silver Astor for Best Actress at the 32nd Mar del Plata International Film Festival.

== Filmography ==
- The Orheim Company (2012) (as Irene)
- Kiss Me You Fucking Moron (2013) (as Tale)
- The Wave (2015) (as Vibeke)
- Doktor Proktors tidsbadekar (2015) (as Jeanne d'Arc)
- Askeladden - I Dovregubbens Hall (2017) (as Princess Kristin)
- Thelma (2017) (as Thelma)
- Beforeigners (TV Series) (2019) (as Ada/Trine Syversen)
- Askeladden - I Soria Moria slott (2019) (as Princess Kristin)
- Marerittet (2022) (as Mona)
- Succession (2023) (as Ebba)
- Arkitekten (TV Series) (2023)

== Awards ==
- 2017 - Silver Astor for Best Actress - Mar del Plata International Film Festival - Thelma
