= Outlier (TV series) =

Norwegian television series

- Created by: Kristine Berg; Arne Berggren
- Screenplay by: Kristine Berg; Arne Berggren
- Directed by: Kristine Berg; Arne Berggren; Ken Are Bongo
- Starring: Hanne Mathisen Haga; Erik Smith-Meyer; Stein Bjørn; Jonas Delerud; Kim-Runar Klodiussen; Eila Ballovara Varsi; Marius Lien
- Country of origin: Norway
- Original languages: Norwegian; English; Sámi
- No. of seasons: 1
- No. of episodes: 8 (list of episodes)

Production
- Running time: 42–45 mins. (per episode)
- Production company: Shuuto Arctic

Original release
- Network: HBO Nordic
- Release: November 18, 2020

Outlier is a Norwegian eight-part television crime drama, which premiered on November 18, 2020 on HBO Nordic. In Australia it was broadcast on SBS-TV's streaming service, On Demand from April 2, 2021. Outlier was created and scripted by Kristine Berg and Arne Berggren. Berg and Berggren co-directed all episodes, assisted by Ken Are Bongo as co-director for three episodes. It was filmed in Troms and Finnmark regions from July 2020 for Shuuto Arctic and distributed by REinvent. Outlier's main protagonist, Maja Angell (Hanne Mathisen Haga) investigates the murder of a young woman, who was found in Maja's fictitious home village, Nerbygd, northern Norway (near actual town, Bardufoss). Nerbygd police chief, Johan (Stein Bjørn) quickly arrests a suspect – case closed. Maja believes police have the wrong man and returns to Nerbygd to determine whether the perpetrator is a serial killer.

== Plot ==
Kautokeino resident Elle finds fellow villager Sofie's mobile phone by the side of the road. Sofie is later found dead in Nerbygd's caravan park. Later, Elle tries to hand the phone to the police but they don't want it. London-based criminal psychologist Maja follows the case online. After local police chief Johan arrests a suspect, Maja believes he is innocent as his past record is for violent but impulsive crimes; he would not have planned to kidnap a girl, take her to a caravan site, kill her, stage the body and leave the scene clean and tidy. To be so precise suggests to Maja the killer has practiced. Maja suspects an organized serial killer is at work.

She travels to Nerbygd and starts her own investigation. Initially dismissive of Maja's theories, having eventually extracted a 'confession' from the suspect, Nerbygd police consider the case closed. Maja seeks help from her retired journalist father Anders, who directs her to newspaper archivist Dan. The police eventually agree to hand over files of old cases in case the killer is 'experienced' and they have missed his activity in the past through oversight / assuming women had left the country.

From the files, Dan and Maja identify several "soft targets" – loner females with little family support – who disappeared in previous years with no substantial investigation. When one such historical victim, Tina, is found dead, Johan's second-in-charge, Erik hesitantly assists Maja.

Meanwhile Bardufoss resident Trond is North Security's field operative. He installs and checks cameras and alarms across northern Norway, Finland and Sweden. He uses his skills (and installed cameras) to stalk, kidnap and kill victims. Initially, we do not see him attack anyone but watch him viewing private camera footage. He has a wife and child.

Elle does not get on with her father and leaves home. She starts work as one of several young house-keepers at a hotel in the next town.

Twenty years earlier Maja's brother Petter died in a car accident (suicide is mentioned earlier when Maja sits by his grave). At that time, ten-year old Maja had also been molested, but it was not taken seriously and she was told she was having nightmares. She must then have repressed her memories of that time. When, in the present, Maja displays increasing confusion over the killer's victims and her childhood traumas she is excluded from the investigations.

Elle trails Sofie's work history as a motel maid. Elle follows the trail to Nerbygd, but is dismissed by both Johan and a now distraught Maja. While returning home, Elle is kidnapped by Trond and held in an obscured forest hut. Maja is re-instated to help find Elle. Maja determines Trond is the killer and, with Erik and police, attempts to capture him.

== Cast ==
=== Main cast ===
- Hanne Mathisen Haga as Maja Angell: criminal psychologist, PhD candidate, lecturer at a London university, Petter's younger sister, Petter died 20 years earlier when Maja was 10
- Erik Smith-Meyer as Anders Angell: Kathrine's husband, Petter and Maja's father, retired Nerbygd newspaper editor
- Stein Bjørn as Johan: Nerbygd police chief, investigates Sofie's death, dismissive of Maja's analyses as too far-fetched
- Jonas Delerud as Erik: Nerbygd police officer, Johan's second-in-charge, initially sceptical of Maja's ideas
- Kim-Runar Klodiussen as Dan Robin: Nerbygd newspaper archivist, assists Maja's investigations
- Eila Ballovara Varsi as Elle Jannok: Kautokeino resident, young woman, raised by father, helps with farm chores, leaves to learn about Sofie's disappearance and murder
- Marius Lien as Trond Kverntagen: North Security manager, field operative, married to Anna with daughter Lilya

=== Additional cast ===
- Guri Johnson as Kathrine Angell: Maja's mother, unresponsive, possibly demented, nursing home resident
- Benjamin Noble as Edward: London university psychology professor, Maja's tutor and boyfriend, concerned over her involvement in Sofie's murder case
- Jørn Bjørn Fuller-Gee as Eivind Salomonsen: Maja's cousin, Petter's contemporary, North Security board member with Rune Mosli
- Kristine Myhre Tunheim as Anne-Li: Eivind's wife, dislikes Maja, warns him to avoid her
- Anethe Alfsvaag as Anna: Trond's wife, Lilya's mother
- Ella Maren Alfsvåg Jørgensen as Lilya: Anna and Trond's daughter
- Kristian Figenschow as "old police deputy" (Gunnar Enoksen): former Nerbygd police chief, dismissive of Maja's concerns over historical disappearances, such as Tina's
- Viktor Enoksen as Skorpa: Nerbygd police officer, assists Johan and Erik
- Trude Øines as Emma: reported her friend, Tina Danielsen, as missing in 2008
- Johannes Y. Meløe as Roy Eliassen: 27-year-old man, violent, drug-related criminal, suspect in Sofie's murder
- Anne Katrine Haugen as "Roy's mother": uncooperative with police, talks to Maja
- Geir Gulbrandsen as "Roy's lawyer" (Jensberg): allows Maja access to Roy
- Cora Fransisca Karlberg as "maid" Billie: works at Djupelv hotel, inducts Elle
- Zoe Winther Hansen as "maid" Lilly: works at Djupelv hotel
- Pernille Sandøy as Sofie: Kautokeino resident, 19-year-old friend of Elle, found dead in Nerbygd caravan
- Egil Keskitalo as "Elle's father": reindeer herder, strict, work-focussed
- Anna Karoline Bjelvin as Anine Karlssen: hires North Security, has faulty surveillance camera
- Ola Karlsen as "jogger": reported as missing near recently burned-down building close to Dividalen
- Hans Kristian Elvenes as "power plant boss" (Odd Knut Sandbakken): Johan's friend, cuts power in specific regions over time as "stress test" for electricity supply
- Ingá Ánne Márjá Bongo as Sofie's sister: younger sister, befriends Elle
- Sara Inga Utsi Bongo as Sofie's mother: uninterested in Sofie's whereabouts
- Marie Charlotte Thomsen Lund as "nurse": looks after Kathrine at nursing home
- Espen Olaisen as "IT-expert" (Bjørnar Michaelsen): runs Webconsult which houses North Security's website
- Marja Kivenmäki as "receptionist Finland": tells Maja that Nerbygd police never asked for CCTV footage
- Christian Lindholm as "farmer": owns Morholt dairy farm

== Episodes ==
No.	Title	Directed by	Written by	Original release date
1	"The Killing (no: Drapnet)"	Kristine Berg; Arne Berggren; Ken Are Bongo	Kristine Berg; Arne Berggren	18 November 2020
Van drives through snow-covered landscape. In back, Sofie breathes fearfully. Kautokeino: Elle trudges along road, finds mobile, answers but cannot hear. At home, Elle to "Elle's father": been at party. London: Maja lectures about male serial killers choosing "soft targets". Maja follows Sofie's case. Edward to Maja: student complained about personalizing lectures. Elle: found mobile; "Elle's father": focus on chores. In plastic-coated room camera films Sofie: tied, wearing hood. Elle answers mobile, learns its Sofie's. "Sofie's mother" to Elle: disinterested, Sofie disappears for days. "Sofie's sister": Sofie left for hotel work. Nerbygd: police find Sofie's naked corpse inside caravan, possibly strangled. Four weeks later: Skorpa catches Roy. Maja to Edward: police have wrong man. Roy's impulsive, disorganized; killer's controlled, well-planned. Edward: too traumatic to return home. Maja exits Bardufoss Airport, drives hire car to Nerbygd, parks at grandmother's home. At police station Johan introduces Erik. Maja: Sofie's murder? Johan: Roy confessed; case closed. Maja: investigation notes? Johan: no. Trond at motel, bag has security cameras. Maja to Anders: paper's files on Sofie? Anders: no access. Maja attends midsummer party. Kathrine's incoherent. Maja visits Petter's gravesite. Eivind: why Maja returned? Maja enters crime scene. Trond's laptop has views of different homes, including Anine's.
2	"Wrong Man (no: Feil mann)"	Kristine Berg; Arne Berggren; Ken Are Bongo	Kristine Berg; Arne Berggren	25 November 2020
"Sofie's sister" to Elle: police uninterested. Bardufoss: Anine calls Trond: faulty surveillance. Trond in site office: checks cameras, sees Anine. Nerbygd: Johan confronts Maja for entering crime scene. Maja questions his investigation. Johan: stay away. "Roy's mother" to Maja: he's aggressive, troubled, few friends. "Elle's father": do not get involved. Police to Elle: case's solved. Maja meets Eivind and Anne-Li. Anne-Li to Eivind: avoid Maja. Trond visits Anine. Police to Elle: wait for summons. Maja talks to Roy. He's easily upset, quickly gets angry. Maja to Jonsberg: he’s not murderer. Trond to Anine: problem fixed. Maja runs along until Johan stops in front. Confronts her over continued interference. Maja: no case against Roy, should find real perpetrator. Court hearing: Roy released. Maja to Anders: need criminal case files up to 20 years ago. Perpetrator has perfected techniques. Anders sends Maja to Dan. She wants cases: missing women, murders, serious crimes against women. Elle to follow Sofie's journey, leaves home against father's objections. Dan hands over files. Maja explains "soft targets". Trond visits North Security clients. Elle arrives in Djupelv, looks for work at hotel. Maja hears noise in home, sees Roy. Roy assaults Maja but runs away when Dan returns.
3	"Old Tracks (no: Gamle spor)"	Kristine Berg; Arne Berggren; Ken Are Bongo	Kristine Berg; Arne Berggren	2 December 2020
Bardufoss: Trond reviews camera footage. Lily and Anna enter room singing birthday song. Nerbygd: Maja tells Johan about Roy's attack. Johan: joint-investigation in disused warehouse. Djupelv: Billie instructs Elle on duties as hotel maid. Maja to Johan: investigating cases with similarities to Sofie's. Trond hears radio: Maja appointed to investigation. Anna to Trond: take time off, spend day together. Trond: work commitments, beers with mates. Trond drives SUV into forested area, sees building. Dan to Maja: Tina missing since 2008. Maja and Erik interview Emma. Erik assumes Tina chose to disappear or drug-addled. Maja: investigation was minimal. Trond enters Maja's home, looks around. Dan details days surrounding Tina's disappearance. Elle follows Billie and truckie, through parklands to truck. Anders to Maja: police not enough resources to investigate disappearances. Maja and Dan study Moholt farmers dispute over incorrectly parked van. Maja asks current "farmer" where he would hide body. Johan and Maja talk to Gunnar but he dismisses idea of serial killer. Johan agrees to search farm. Elle asks Lilly about Billie with truckie: maids get 2000 kroner for handjobs. Lilly: Sofie did same. Dividalen: Trond enters damaged building with plastic-lined walls, checks camera. Maja returns to Morholt farm: corpse found.
4	"Contexts (no: Sammenhenger)"	Kristine Berg; Arne Berggren	Kristine Berg; Arne Berggren	9 December 2020
Maja to Emma: found Tina's corpse, will find killer. Erik: two cases unlinked, differing modus operandi. Maja: killer's evolved, learned from mistakes. Maja: more data, killer covered wider area. Maja and Dan re-enact and re-trace Sofie's journeywhy killer travelled so far with Sofie? Trond reviews cameras. Maja to "receptionist Finland": any CCTV footage? Nerbygd police were never asked. Dan puts Maja into car boot.( Nerbygd: Elle arrives. Elle to father: can look after herself. ) Dan releases Maja at caravan park. Killer's actions require good knowledge of caravan site. Dan asks owner for client and work list. Erik to Maja: more data, organised geographically. Killer is local, knows back roads. Johan: annoyed by queries from superiors over Maja's questioning in Finland. Maja asks Erik: similar cases from Finland and Sweden. Dividalen: "Jogger" finds plastic-lined room. Trond sees "jogger" on screen, packs bag. Edward phones Maja - he wants to visit. Killer's trusted person, travelling across borders. Johan's not interested in additional cases: wants to hand investigations over to larger precinct, Tromsø. Maja's distraught by decision. Elle tries to get police to take Sophie's phone. Johan refuses and says 'did Maja put you up to this?' Elle: something happened to Sofie at Djupelv hotel. Johan: report it on website. Elle decides to look for Maja. Trond confronts "jogger" whilst holding a large wrench. Later, Trond watches the building burn down.
5	"Setback (no: Tilbakeslag)"	Kristine Berg; Arne Berggren	Kristine Berg; Arne Berggren	16 December 2020
Maja in bar. Trond, Eivind and Rune drink. Eivind tgoes over to Maja: was Petter's accident suicide? Diving says Maja stayed with His family after her brother's death for a month but Maja thought it was only 2 or 3 days. at the station Eric to Johan: a "jogger" has been reported missing. Johan: not our district, keep caseload low, maintain high completion rate. Erik investigates the area the jogger was in, and sees the burned-down site. Maja to Erik when he brings her her family's case files. She wants details on her brother's death. Erik to Maja: Petter was young, driving too fast, suicide unlikely. He then says SHE has a police file! Disruptive behaviour as a teen and then September 1999, Child Services say she reports being held, bound, and inappropriately touched. Maja shocked and visits father. Maia to Anders: why was report withdrawn? Why not believe her? Anders: dealing with son's death and Kathrine's breakdown, could not cope with Maja. Police to Erik: burnt bones in ruin. Erik to Johan: "jogger" murdered. Erik finds camera carton. Maja to Kathrine: wants answers. Kathrine's unresponsive. Maja on phone to Edward: removed from case. Elle dissuaded from talking more to Maja by her talking about Petter's death. Elle phones father: will come home. Skorpa: North Security handles specific camera found on burnt building: it might help investigation. Elle walks along road, Trond's car stops. Anders plays with Petter's toy car, goes to garage cabinet, removes envelope. Trond to Elle: killing's easy, Norway's trust-based. Elle's frightened, wants to get out, Trond stops in forest.
6	"Secrets (no: Hemmeligheter)"	Kristine Berg; Arne Berggren	Kristine Berg; Arne Berggren	23 December 2020
Anders to Kathrine: coward, hiding behind dementia. Kathrine: unresponsive. Anders: gives Kathrine envelope. Anders places toy car on Petter's grave. Maja wakes, missed Anders' calls. Anders in garage, door closes. Eric to Johan: get assistance. Erik called to Anders' home. Trond: views Elle, interrupted by Lilya. Elle recovers, goes outside, into forest. Trond sees Elle's gone. Erik finds Anders hanged. Elle cannot find way to road. Trond catches up, she will never get out. Elle gives up, returns with Trond. Maja at father's, finds Erik, sees Anders' corpse. Trond ties Elle to chair. Maja greets Edward. Edward says he is 'there for her' but she should get professional help. Maja attends Anders' memorial, sees Kathrine singing at Petter's gravesite. Maja at wake observes that Eivind's family always takes care of matters (funerals). Maja becomes fearful in adjacent field, remembers being chased. Afraid to enter barn, she rants at Eivind's family: hiding evil. Maja tells Edward she was fobbed off: having nightmares. Maja and Edward return to grandmother's place. Maja gets call that Kathrine wants to see her. Maja finds envelope with her mum containing childhood drawings. Maja to nurse: Kathrine over-medicated? Maja abducts Kathrine and withdraws her meds. Edward swears at her, then: police will look for Kathrine. Drawings illustrate trauma, including man behind a camera pointed at another figure.
7	"Breakdown (no: Sammenbrudd)"	Kristine Berg; Arne Berggren	Kristine Berg; Arne Berggren	30 December 2020
Kathrine rants calling Maja a 'spoiled brat'. Later Kathrine comes downstairs tells her that her Grandfather took photos but never was photographed. Edward reports Kathrine to the police and a "Nurse" and Skorpa arrive to get her. Edward commands Maja to return to London with him - he has already packed her bag. In car, Maja's phone rings and Edward tells her not to answer it. At airport, Erik texts Maja: new victim Elle, seen on live stream. Edward gives up and flies home. Johan now on sick leave, so Erik is in charge. Erik: assistance from Special Forces and Tromsø police. Maja joins them. Maja to Dan: did my molester become serial killer? Maja: someone caught me, hands over eyes, whispers this is our secret. Someone who observes but not seen (camera too). Maja hypothesizes killer likes surveillance. Trond gives Elle water, checks ties. Skorpa to Maja: "jogger" found dead, camera supplied by North Security. Board members: Rune and Eivind. Maja: Eivind's my cousin! Maja asks Eivind about North Security. Anne Li: police outside. Eivind runs but soon caught. Erik allows Maja to monitor Eivind's interview. Erik to Eivind: alibis? Eivind has flimsy responses. When queried about porn, Eivind asks for a lawyer. Maja to Dan: Eivind's hiding something. Anne-Li: Eivind, as teenager, caught peeking at young girls, but just a phase. His friends were Andreas and Trond. Trond runs North Security now. Anna to Maja: Trond at work, does not know where. Erik to Maja: travelling to industrial area. Anna to Trond: Maja's looking for you.
8	"The Showdown (no: Aksjonen)"	Kristine Berg; Arne Berggren	Kristine Berg; Arne Berggren	6 January 2021
Erik and police enter furniture factory office: no sign of Trond. Trond drives away. Website registered in Nerbygd, run by Bjørnar for North Security. Maja: Trond's client list? There are hundreds. Maja and Erik: where's live stream? Bjørnar: cut power, determine whether stream delayed, where Elle is. Erik asks Johan how to cut power. Johan brings Odd, who proposes "stress tests" to determine outages. Trond returns to Elle: gives water. Power flickers off. Police define forested area having one road in. Trond takes Elle out, Elle starts screaming. Police block road. Trond drives along, stops, asks to meet Maja. Maja: release Elle. Erik is against meeting. Maja wants to shift Trond's focus from Elle to herself. Maja agrees to enter forest, follows Trond's directions. Trond: Maja asked to be held down. Maja searches for Trond. Trond had enjoyed watching Maja being held: molested by Petter. Trond cocks gun. Maja finds Trond's hut, hears gunshot, then finds Trond's corpse and Elle's dead in Trond's car. Maja burns childhood pictures, leaves grandmother's house. Johan back at work. Maja: male investigators do not listen to women. Johan to Maja: return to London. Erik to Maja: 26 cases against Trond, still to be investigated.
