= The Other Munch =

2018 film by Joachim Trier

- Norwegian: Den andre Munch
- Directed by: Emil Trier; Joachim Trier
- Produced by: Nicolai Moland; Thomas Robsahm
- Starring: Karl Ove Knausgaard
- Cinematography: Jon Gaute Espevold; Magnus Flåto; Petter Holmern Halvorsen; Fred Arne Wergeland
- Edited by: Christian Siebenherz
- Music by: Ola Fløttum
- Production company: Dont Look Now
- Distributed by: NRK
- Release date: 6 June 2018
- Running time: 48 minutes
- Country: Norway
- Language: Norwegian

The Other Munch (Norwegian: Den andre Munch) is a 2018 Norwegian documentary film directed by Emil and Joachim Trier. It is about the process of creating an exhibition of paintings by Edvard Munch, curated by the writer Karl Ove Knausgård.

== Synopsis ==
The film follows the work with the exhibition Mot skogen – Knausgård om Munch ("To the woods – Knausgård on Munch"), held in the summer of 2017 at the Munch Museum in Oslo and curated by the writer Karl Ove Knausgård. Knausgård and the filmmaker Joachim Trier travel in the footsteps of Edvard Munch to understand his paintings better. They discuss parallels between Munch's and Knausgård's works.

== Production ==
The Munch Museum approached Knausgaard about curating an exhibition of Munch's work. The exhibition became a success and drew close to 130,000 visitors. The documentary film directed by the brothers Emil and Joachim Trier was produced by Nicolai Moland and Thomas Robsahm for Don't Look Now. In addition to the film, the exhibition resulted in Knausgård's book Så mye lengsel på så liten flate: En bok om Edvard Munchs bilder, where he discusses Munch with artists and other cultural figures.

== Release ==
The film was broadcast on NRK on 6 June 2018. It was shown at the Film Society of Lincoln Center in New York on 25 September 2018 and at the 2019 Copenhagen International Documentary Film Festival.

== Reception ==
Peter Schepelern of Filmmagasinet Ekko wrote that it mostly is Trier who carries The Other Munch with "clear, intellectual analyses", although it is Knausgård who adds original perspectives through his intuitive interpretations of paintings in the second half of the film. Schepelern wrote that the film's emphasis on less known Munch paintings makes it possible to see the artist in a new light, as someone who gave meaning to seemingly banal aspects of everyday life. Michael Bach Henriksen of Kristeligt Dagblad wrote that the film's title refers to the ambition to show a less known, life-affirming side of Munch, but the portrayal of Edvard Munch as courageous and uncompromising also gives the impression that it is Knausgård who is "the other Munch".
