= Stayer (TV series) =

Norwegian musical drama television series

- Genre: Musical, drama
- Created by: Pia Lykke
- Screenplay by: Kjetil Indregard; Tone Johnsen; Miriam Larsen; Pia Lykke; Mads Løken
- Directed by: Aksel Hennie, Stian Kristiansen
- Starring: Aksel Hennie; Hannah Elise Adolfsen Fjeldbraaten; Jeppe Beck Laursen; Marian Saastad Ottesen; Oskar Feiring Torre; Jørgen Cleve Broch; Alva Schavenius
- Music by: Thomas Dybdahl
- Country of origin: Norway
- Original languages: Norwegian, English
- No. of seasons: 2
- No. of episodes: 12

Production
- Producers: Hege Skjerven Clausen, Kristoffer Sindre Vittersø, Therese Bøhn
- Running time: 31–38 min.
- Production companies: Viaplay Group, Monster AS

Original release
- Network: Viaplay
- Release: 17 July 2024

Stayer is a Norwegian musical, drama television series, which was streamed from 17 July 2024 on Viaplay. It was created by Pia Lykke who also co-wrote the script with others. Aksel Hennie directed the first season of six episodes and Stian Kristiansen took over for the second season. Filming began in April 2023 in the regional municipality of Eidsvoll with additional scenes shot in Oslo. The first season introduces Hennie as the fading rock singer, Even, who returns to his hometown, Eidsvoll in early 2023. Besides reviving his career by touring, Even reconnects with his long-estranged teenage daughter, Annie (Hannah Elise Adolfsen Fjeldbraaten). Evan's brother, Petter (Jeppe Beck Laursen) is the local principal, and is married to café manager, Monica (Marian Saastad Ottesen). Their children include Benjamin (Jørgen Cleve Broch) and Hermine (Alva Schavenius). Annie befriends music student, Patrick (Oskar Feiring Torre). The second season was filmed in early 2024. Annie joins the music class alongside Hermine and Patrick; they undertake a songwriting assignment. Even's tour is cancelled due to his misbehaviours. He also has writer's block and appropriates Annie's song for his comeback single. Monica moves in with her new partner, while Petter alternates living at Annie's and at his family home.

== Premise ==
Even is touring Norway, predominantly singing in English, with fans insisting on his top 10 Norwegian language hit, "Villkatt". He claims he wrote it for his then-girlfriend, Lena. Even wants to drop it, but Marion argues else wise. Annie idolises Lena, who challenges her to become more out-going. Annie starts writing "Mørke ganger" (English: "Dark Hallways") for Lena's birthday. Lena also sets Annie a treasure hunt by writing a chain of clues to solve. Annie starts a friendship with Patrick. Lena dies in a vehicle collision with an elk. Even briefly returns to Eidsvoll, but clashes with Annie and resumes his tour. Petter and Monica care for Annie and arrange Lena's funeral. However, they are having marital problems, themselves. Annie sleeps irregularly and takes too many of Monica's pills. Under the pills' influence, Annie hurts Hermine, runs off and is found atop silos. Petter tells Even to assume responsibility for Annie. Monica is concerned that Annie tried to suicide. Even loses his temper at fans requesting "Villkatt": he throws his microphone at the audience: breaking a fan's nose. Mainstream news and social media backlash results in venues dropping shows – eventually, his entire tour is cancelled.

Even stays in Berlin to write his comeback single. Annie has enrolled in music class. Petter and Monica have separated. They alternately reside at the family home for a week with their children. Monica then stays with her partner, Lars. Petter stays at Lena's home with Annie. Annie, Patrick and Hermine work on "Mørke ganger" for their songwriting assignment. Even returns to Eidsvoll with writer's block and cannot satisfy Marion's criteria for a hit single. Petter organises for a school concert at Rocky's to showcase their songs. In desperation, Even appropriates Annie's work. He records it with changed title and slightly altered lyrics. Marion, unaware of his deception, approves of it. Hermine suspects that "Villkatt" was based on Petter's love song to Monica. However, both Petter and Even deny this. Annie finds out Even stole her song and is due to perform it on national TV. She is shattered that Even has fouled Lena's tribute. Petter also discovers Even's deception. He recalls Even's stealing "Villkatt" and taking over his band. Petter berates Even: if he performs "Mørke ganger", she will never forgive him, nor will Petter.

== Cast and characters ==
=== Main cast ===
- Aksel Hennie as Even Elstad: middle-aged Lothario, rock singer; whose first, biggest hit is "Villkatt" (English: "Wild Cat"); Annie's absent father, Lena's former partner
- Hannah Elise Adolfsen Fjeldbraaten as Annie Dale: introvert, secondary school technology and industry student, Lena and Even's 16-year-old daughter, owns Pixie. Switches to music class, forms ad hoc band with Patrick, Hermine, Pernille
- Jeppe Beck Laursen as Petter Elstad: secondary school assistant principal, former musician, Even's older brother. Later becomes principal, stays with Annie
- Marian Saastad Ottesen as Monica: café manager, Petter's wife. Separates from Petter, lives with new partner, Lars
- Oskar Feiring Torre as Patrick: 18-year-old secondary school music student, befriends Annie, member of Oslo-based TaDa Vinci band. TaDa Vinci gains recording contract
- Jørgen Cleve Broch as Benjamin Elstad: Petter and Monica's older, secondary school son, Annie's cousin. Befriends Manuel
- Lena Meieran as Marion: Even's long-suffering manager. Encourages Even to record new single
- Alva Schavenius as Hermine Elstad: Petter and Monica's 16-year-old daughter, Annie's cousin, music student. Bass guitarist-singer in Annie's band, Tommy Jørpeland's girlfriend
- Mike Straith as William Elstad: Petter and Monica's infant son

=== Recurring cast ===
- Jasmin Emily Paixao Lindstrøm as Zoe: music student, singer-keyboardist in classical quartet, becomes Annie's friend
- Ingeborg Othilie Pihl as Guro: music student
- Jonas Vollset as Jonas: music student, guitarist
- Kaori Solvang as Jasmine: Hermine's schoolfriend
- Pernille Brandsnes-Daniel as Pernille: music student, drummer
- Ella Lockert as Ida: Hermine's schoolfriend
- Bo Lindquist-Ellingsen as Bjørn: music student, saxophonist
- Mira Sofie Romstad as Mira p.k.a. Satan: music student, lead singer-guitarist in Typhon
- Ottar Johnson as Ottar: music student, violinist
- Ole Røed Entian as Ole: music student, guitarist
- Ingar Helge Gimle as Jimmy Henriksen: secondary school music teacher, formerly taught Even, Petter; Aud's husband. Had stroke, quits teaching
- Thor Michael Aamodt as Hans Petter Elstad: Even and Petter's father
- Ane Dahl Torp as Lena Dale: Annie's mother, Even's ex-partner
- Peik as Pixie: Annie's pet dog

=== Season one only ===
- Kalle Hennie as Kalle: Even's guitarist. Note: Kalle Hennie and Aksel Hennie are cousins
- Tommy Kristiansen as Tommy: Even's bandmate
- Ole Steinar Nesset as Ole: Even's drummer
- Cash Khazai as Cash: Even's bandmate
- Shaun Bartlett as Shaun: Even's sound engineer

=== Season two only ===
- Valdemar Irgens as Tommy Jørpeland: Hermine's boyfriend
- Frode Winther as Lars Hverven: realtor, Monica's lover, becomes her new partner
- Cengiz Al as Manuel: Monica's accountant, Benjamin's love interest
- Maria Agwumaro as Amina Ary: record producer, songwriter
- Hanne Fjeldbraaten as Rocky: owns Rocky's hotel, music venue
- Cat Haave as Sabine: Even's latest girlfriend

== Episode guide ==
=== Season one ===
| No. overall | No. in season | Title | Directed by | Written by | Original release date |
|---|---|---|---|---|---|
| 1 | 1 | "Wild Cat" (Villkatt) | Aksel Hennie | Kjetil Indregard; Tone Johnsen; Miriam Larsen; Pia Lykke; Mads Løken | 17 July 2024 |
Even sings into microphone. Marion asks groupies: are you 18? Even orders fans: wait for "Villkatt". After further interruptions, he walks off. Annie gives mittens and cake to Lena for birthday. After breakfast Monica asks to speak with Petter. Annie enters school workshop. Marion and Even argue over "Villkatt". Even: tired of it; Marion: obligation to fans. Monica, Petter attend marriage counsellor. Monica: sessions provide no progress. Annie working in café; Monica to Hermine: ask Annie to Jasmine's party. Hermine: Annie does not like parties. Lena gives Annie first treasure hunt clue. Marion insists Even perform hit song. Lena encourages Annie: attend party. Annie wears Lena's favourite teeshirt. Evan sings "Villkatt" repeatedly: Marion's annoyed. Lena drops Annie off on way to night shift. Annie passes Patrick, who follows her to silos. He introduces himself. They discuss favourite musicians. Patrick: vocals, guitar in Oslo band. Even leaves stage, picks up another groupie. Next day, citizens celebrate Constitution Day, Annie cannot find Lena; greets Benjamin. Petter welcomes audience; meets police, walks towards Annie. Lena died in collision. Marion wakes Even: Petter calling. Even: cannot return home. Annie driven to Monica's home. Even downplays Petter's call. Annie lies on bed.
| 2 | 2 | "Siberian Streetlights" (Sibirske gatelys) | Aksel Hennie | Lev David, Caroline Glomnes, Kjetil Indregard, Pia Lykke | 17 July 2024 |
Week later: Even continued touring. Annie feigns sleep when Monica approaches; funeral's tomorrow. Even enters Lena's home. Annie gives Even frosty reception: demands he leave. Even cannot start pickup. Annie sniffs Lena's teeshirt. Petter adresses classes: notify teacher if attending funeral. Petter notices Even arrived. Petter: elk ran into Lena's car. Even attempts foisting Annie onto Petter. Petter: Even must look after Annie. Patrick learns Even is Annie's father. Hermine discusses performing Even's song, "She Was Never Really Gone" at funeral; Annie unenthusiastically agrees. Monica prepared elk stew for dinner; Even does not attend. Monica: Hermine covered Annie's shifts. Monica hands Annie oxazepam for insomnia; recommends half a pill. Back in Oslo, Even informs Marion: Lena died. Marion argues: Even must attend funeral. Even arrives late, sits next to Annie. Annie delivers brief eulogy. Hermine sings. Even tries praising Annie: she rails at his attention-seeking behaviour. Hans gives Even condolences. Even to Petter: touring, cannot stay. Petter: live in Eidsvoll; look after Annie. Even: return after Fjellhallen gig. Annie to Petter: going home, not reception. Monica cannot believe Petter left Annie alone. Monica: getting divorced. Even performs next show. Annie finds Lena's next message. Even remains for after-party, leaves with groupie.
| 3 | 3 | "Flight of Birds" (Fuglenes flukt) | Aksel Hennie | Lev David, Caroline Glomnes, Kjetil Indregard, Pia Lykke | 17 July 2024 |
Annie wakes, Even never returned. Even's still in hotel. Hermine wakes Petter on couch. Monica cannot find handbag. Annie attends counsellor, Mina, but does not speak. Annie, overwhelmed with grief, takes two pills. Marion: Even interview before soundcheck. Annie's lethargic, drops food tray. Patrick asks after her. Hermine runs after Annie. Annie annoyed Hermine sang Even's song. Annie, Hermine struggle: Hermine falls down stairs. Annie walks off. Interviewer focuses on "Villkatt", Lena's recent death. Petter learns Hermine's injured. Over excited students: Annie was drugged, pushed Hermine. Petter looks for Annie. Patrick to Petter: she's at silos. Annie holds Lena's clue, "looking at heaven". Petter arrives, grabs Annie from silo's edge. Marion: Petter calling. Even takes taxi to Eidsvoll. Petter: Annie took unknown drug. Monica: will wash laundry. Even, Petter discuss non-starting pickup. Monica castigates them: focus on Annie's attempted suicide. Annie: took two of Monica's pills, wanted rest; not kill herself. She orders them to leave. Even refues. At their home, Petter soothes Hermine, Monica leaves for yoga club. Even cannot handle Annie's anger. Later, Petter attempts reconciliation with Monica: she refuses. Petter gives 1990s demos to Benjamin. Annie finds Lena's next clue; sleeps in Lena's bed.
| 4 | 4 | "The Two of Us" (Vi to) | Aksel Hennie | Lev David, Caroline Glomnes, Kjetil Indregard, Pia Lykke | 17 July 2024 |
Annie to Even: each goes own way. Annie berates Patrick for revealing location. Patrick: everyone was worried. Even to Marion: Annie never attempted suicide; tour continues. Annie, Hermine meet Mina; Annie apologises, they hug it out. Hermine leaves. When Even arrives, Annie departs. Mina to Even: Annie cannot be alone. Annie shuns Patrick, who apologises. Even asks Petter: supervise Annie for tour dates. Petter: Monica's divorcing. Even insists, Petter loses temper: Annie needs care not neglect. Jimmy to Even: take Annie on tour. Benjamin discovers Petter crying in car. Hermine cannot fix café's steamer. Monica researches communication with teenagers. Hans refuses to mind Annie. Even, Annie argue about her attending gig. Marion drives both to Oslo. While preparing, Even leaves Annie with Marion. Annie, Even resume arguing: Annie wishes Even were dead, instead. Marion gives Annie, Even's credit card: buy burger. Even meets fans, backstage. Even cannot find Annie. Annie takes taxi home. Marion to Even: get on stage, now; Even performs. Annie visits Patrick, with his siblings. When food deliverer calls, Patrick asks Annie to entertain children: Annie sings. Fans interrupt Even, he rails at them: throws microphone into audience, then leaves. Patrick shows social media reporting Even's tantrum.
| 5 | 5 | "Your Heart" (Ditt hjerte) | Aksel Hennie | Lev David, Caroline Glomnes, Kjetil Indregard, Pia Lykke | 17 July 2024 |
Hermine to Petter: Even's gone crazy. Marion to Even: media shit-storm; victim's Sri Lankan-born, Tim. Reporters: Even's violent racist. Venues cancelling. Students discuss Even's misbehaviours. Patrick to Annie: wants to leave? Tim receives souvenirs; Even apologises, they hug it out. VG reporter asks about his headbutting Kjetil in 2008: Even cannot remember. Patrick helps Anne solve Lena's clue. They swim in underwear. Next clue: "More of Twat". Patrick sees Annie's recording music on computer: asks to hear it. Annie plays "Mørke ganger". Patrick: switch to music studies. Monica sees Benjamin's classmate, Therese has her handbag. Even returns home; listens to "Mørke ganger". Annie observes, but does not respond. Monica to Petter: Benjamin sold bag to Therese. Later, Even says nothing about Annie's music. Petter uses jumper cables on Even's pickup. Petter complains about Monica: no sex for months. Even: she's cheating? Petter: concentrate on Annie. Benjamin admits to stealing Monica's bag. Benjamin: who lives at flat you visit so often? Monica goes silent. Annie to Even: enrol in music next semester. Even: Monica put laundry in hallway. Annie finds Lena's teeshirt: Lena's smell's gone. Monica lies to Petter: Benjamin explained; its not her bag. Petter returns to their bed.
| 6 | 6 | "She Was Never Really Gone" (Hun var egentlig aldri borte) | Aksel Hennie | Lev David, Caroline Glomnes, Kjetil Indregard, Pia Lykke | 17 July 2024 |
Even's PR agents: concerned about further accusations. Even cannot recall them. Even refuses to consider therapy. Benjamin sifts through Petter's old demos. Even learns Jim had stroke; he's in coma. Patrick suggests Iggy Pop for Lena's clue. Annie's doubts switching to music studies. Even, Petter reminisce about Jim. Iggy Pop was incorrect. Even suggests his EP, Even More. It has Lena's last message, Annie's reward. Police provide Lena's effects. Even hands box to Annie. After school, Petter plays guitar for Benjamin. Petter shows their audio player. Monica leaves for yoga; Benjamin encourages Petter to attend, too. Annie recovers Lena's mittens; cries when she smells them. Annie views Lena's video for Annie's confirmation. Even praises "Mørke ganger", which Annie started before Lena died. Petter arrives at yoga venue: Monica never attended. Benjamin plays Petter's 1990 demo for Hermione, which sounds like "Villkatt". Made before Even joined Petter's band. Annie to Patrick: applied for music class. Annie meets Patrick's girlfriend, Nevena. Petter accuses Monica of cheating. Monica claims: uses flat for alone time. She takes Petter to flat, who apologises. Annie to Even: concert tickets to Foo Fighters in El Paso, but she has no-one to take. Even's tour cancelled.

=== Season two ===
| No. overall | No. in season | Title | Directed by | Written by | Original release date |
|---|---|---|---|---|---|
| 7 | 1 | "New Beginnings" (Ny begynnelse) | Stian Kristiansen | Martina Cecelia Befring, Kjetil Indregard, Tone Johnsen, Pia Lykke, Mads Løken | 17 July 2024 |
New Semester: Annie attends TaDa Vinci performance: Patrick sings, plays guitar. Patrick introduces her to Zoe. He meets record label representatives. Zoe to Annie: Patrick no longer with Nevena. Afterwards, Patrick walks with bandmates. Annie returns by bus; continues writing "Mørke ganger". Hermine buddies Annie for first music class. Even stays in Berlin with Sabine. Hermine introduces Annie to classmates. Receptionist Marit: Jimmy's late; he does not show up. Annie to Marit: last name's Dale not Elstad. Monica prepares meal; Hermine's abrasive about impending divorce. Petter stays with Annie, who describes Jimmy's recovery from stroke. Annie does not know Monica's boyfriend. Monica, Petter meet, but she refuses to discuss living arrangements. Marit to Petter: Jimmy not here, again; music students have no teacher. Patrick hopes for recording contract. Petter meets Jimmy and wife, Aud. Petter: as Jimmy cannot teach, consider administrative position instead, but Jimmy quits. Annie checks social media: Patrick's photographed with various girls. She hears Petter singing, strumming guitar. He recalls being early 1990s rock musician, romancing Monica. Hermine introduces Tommy to Annie. Patrick to Annie: no teacher; should drop out of school. Even returns with German girlfriend, Sabine. Annie goes to bed early: school tomorrow.
| 8 | 2 | "Comeback" (Comeback) | Stian Kristiansen | Martina Cecelia Befring, Kjetil Indregard, Tone Johnsen, Pia Lykke, Mads Løken | 17 July 2024 |
Upon waking, Annie sees Even, Sabine outside doing yoga. Marion to Even: TV interview to present comeback song. Annie objects to Sabine staying over. Music students still have no teacher. Annie: let's organise own concert, with own songs. Petter arrives, Patrick claims: assigned to write songs for concert. Petter agrees. At home, Annie sings, plays guitar as she writes. Even considers producers for recording. Monica unavailable to dine with Petter. Marion sends grand piano for Even's practising. Monica asks to store goods in Even's garage. Lars to Monica: buying Rocky's. Benjamin hides relationship with Manuel. Hermine searches Petter's demos for song ideas. Benjamin to Hermine: Petter denied writing "Villkatt". Sabine points out Monica, Lars dropping off goods. Petter serves modified meat hot dogs for children. Even cannot finish writing song. When Sabine interrupts, Even verbally lashes out: insults Sabine. Annie, Zoe attend party. Benjamin's DJing, flirting with Manuel. Patrick arrives, talks with Annie. Even refuses to supervise music class' songwriting project. Even: Monica has Lars, now. Annie, Patrick observe people dancing. Patrick talks with Nevena. Petter sees Monica with Lars. Sabine leaves Even, but he does not read her note. Annie kisses Zoe. Nevena, Patrick leave. Annie arrives home at dawn.
| 9 | 3 | "Micro" (Mikro) | Stian Kristiansen | Martina Cecelia Befring, Kjetil Indregard, Tone Johnsen, Pia Lykke, Mads Løken | 17 July 2024 |
Zoe berates Annie for falsely kissing her to stir Patrick. Marion's unimpressed with Even's current song – album filler – hire popular songwriters. Petter arranges student concert at Rocky's. Rocky: selling venue to Lars. Amina: Even's desperate to revive career: begins on his song. Annie, Patrick, Hermine practise. Petter advises: start simple, build up layer by layer. Marion: Amina session was uninteresting; need song for TV show. Even, Monica argue. Even accuses her of cheating. Monica counters: Even stole "Villkatt", which Petter wrote about her. Even took over band. Annie overhears Monica: Petter stopped others bullying "Mikro". Monica arrives home, Petter to children: Monica's dating Lars. Annie overhears Even's latest version. Annie to Even: presenting "Mørke ganger" to bandmates; could he be elsewhere tonight? Hermine asks: stay with Annie as Monica's selfish. When Patrick arrives, Annie sings "Mørke ganger"; Patrick, Hermine are amazed. They continue working on it, when Even returns. Even begins to advise; Annie cuts Even short: attention-seeker, bullied as child, "Mikro". Even leaves room, speechless. Hermine, Annie visit Tommy. Hermine to Annie: Patrick, Nevena broke up. Marion: show me what you have; Even performs "Mørke ganger". Hermine plays Petter's demo to Annie. Annie: lyrics differ, but chorus identical. Marion: that's it!
| 10 | 4 | "Dark Hallways" (Mørke ganger) | Stian Kristiansen | Martina Cecelia Befring, Kjetil Indregard, Tone Johnsen, Pia Lykke, Mads Løken | 17 July 2024 |
Annie records vocals with guitar. Annie apologises to Even who denies being bullied. Even repudiates "Villkatt"'s based on Petter's song. Monica scolds Hermine for drinking alcohol. Hermine diverts attention: Benjamin's dating old man. Petter supervises songwriters; Hermine arrives late. Hermine invites Annie to another party. Monica confronts Manuel: too old for Benjamin. Petter berates Hermine for tardiness. Patrick arrives for rehearsal, invites Annie to hang out. When Hermine returns, they practise. Amina produces Even's backing track, Marion: Even to add vocals. Even's version has some altered lyrics. Hermine awestruck by Annie's songwriting. Patrick's called to Oslo: cannot meet Annie. Annie takes alcohol bottle. Even: taping no:Lindmo interview – cannot attend concert;. Annie at Hermine's party. Monica to Lars: Petter knows about us. Hermine: Patrick, Nevena broke up before, might be with Stine? Annie, Hermine share bottle. Hermine: moving into Tommy's apartment. Benjamin to Petter in love with Manuel. Patrick returns: TaDa Vinci signed by label. Annie teases Patrick about girlfriends. Patrick leaves. Lindmo researcher, Christopher asks Even: song's inspiration? Even demurs. Hermine: Monica's false. Tommy does not reply to Hermine. Annie vomits, collapses. Monica answers Hermine's call for help. Even visits hospital, doctor: teenagers experiment with alcohol.
| 11 | 5 | "Brothers" (Brødre) | Aksel Hennie | Martina Cecelia Befring, Kjetil Indregard, Tone Johnsen, Pia Lykke, Mads Løken | 17 July 2024 |
Annie listens to her recording. Marion to Even: song's mastered. Marion refuses Even changing songs. Even listens to his recording; Annie recognises it as hers. Even's desperate to save his career. Annie: you ruined Lena's memorial. Petter arrives as Annie storms outside. Even, Petter reminisce about label signing. Rocky helped their discovery. Petter: Lars' destroying Rocky's, concert will be its last performance. Even: cannot attend, taping Lindmo. Petter: bully who put Even in locker should be jailed. Even: Hans should be jailed. Even: after bullies held him in urinal, Hans would not clean him because he stank. Even: Hans locked him in dark room under stairs, two or three times a week, while Petter was at soccer. Even, Petter visit Hans' home; Even pisses in mailbox. Hans to Even: useless loser. Petter realises Even's stories were true. Marion phones Petter: ask Even for response to song. Marion sends audio file to Petter. Petter listens: same as Annie's. Petter, Even argue about Even stealing songs. Even stole "Villkatt". Even continues denying it. Petter defends Annie's right to "Mørke ganger". Petter: if you play Annie's song, you will lose her forever and me; you will have no-one. Petter drives off.
| 12 | 6 | "The Concert" (Konserten) | Stian Kristiansen | Martina Cecelia Befring, Kjetil Indregard, Tone Johnsen, Pia Lykke, Mads Løken | 17 July 2024 |
Students rehearse at Rocky's. Annie has not shown up. Patrick searches for Annie. Even, Marion enter TV studio. Even ignored Marion's advice to prepare answers. Monica buys flowers. She does not want Lars at concert. Monica attends venue with Benjamin, Manuel. Patrick finds Annie, who's annoyed: Even's playing her song on TV. Even to Christopher: do not mention Annie. Annie: Even also stole "Villkatt" from Petter. Annie feels guilty: Lena usually took train to work, but drove Annie to party. Patrick consoles Annie: your mother loved you. Patrick: have no girlfriend; they kiss. Annie, Patrick enter venue. Petter: perform cover version instead? Annie: will play "Mørke ganger". Typhon with Satan singing, Pernille drumming, start concert. Even's introduced, but walks off. Marion cautions: your career's over. Even: not my song, Annie wrote it. Classical quartet, with Zoe, play. Annie, Patrick, Hermine, Pernille play Annie's song. Even arrives. Annie: moving out, staying with classmate's family. Even: you had world's best mom, you will be all right. Even: did not perform your song. Monica presents flowers to Annie. Annie kisses Patrick, others cheer. Even to Petter: hand over royalties for "Villkatt". Petter: buying Rocky's for students. Annie, Patrick travel to Foo Fighters' concert.
