= En helt vanlig dag på jobben =

2010 Norwegian comedy-drama film

- Film poster
- Directed by: Terje Rangnes
- Written by: Håvard Melnæs (book); Erlend Loe
- Starring: Jan Gunnar Røise; Jon Øigarden; Ingar Helge Gimle
- Release date: 12 March 2010
- Running time: 86 minutes
- Country: Norway
- Language: Norwegian

En helt vanlig dag på jobben (English: A completely average day at work) is a 2010 Norwegian comedy-drama directed by Terje Rangnes, starring Jan Gunnar Røise, Jon Øigarden and Ingar Helge Gimle. The film satirises the working method of celebrity gossip magazine Se og Hør.
