= Kristian Kvakland =

Norwegian sculptor and artist (1927–2011)

Kristian Kvakland (5 February 1927 – 2 October 2011) was a Norwegian sculptor and artist. Among his most famous works is the bronze Amanda-statue of the annual Amanda awards. The statuette originally weighed 4.5 kilograms (9.9 lb), but has since been slimmed down to 2.5 kilograms (5.5 lb).

Kvakland was born in Orkdal Municipality, and was based in Blylaget. His works are represented in a number of public art collections in Norway.
