= Ane Dahl Torp =

Norwegian actress (born 1975)

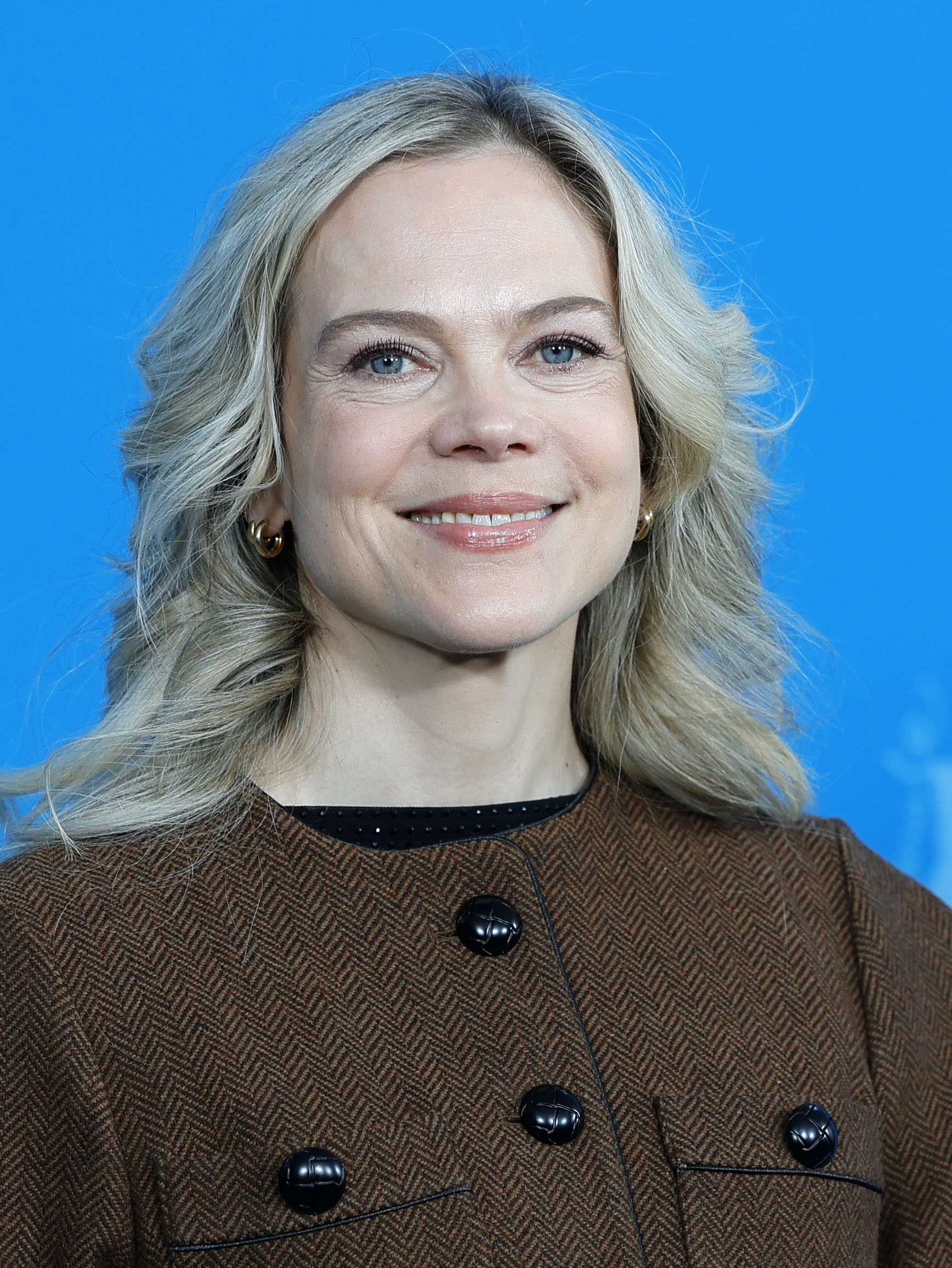
- Torp in 2025
- Born: 1 August 1975 (age 51); Bærum, Norway
- Occupation: Actress
- Spouse: Sjur Miljeteig (m. 2007)
- Children: 2
- Parent: Arne Torp

Ane Dahl Torp (born 1 August 1975) is a Norwegian actress.

== Early life ==
Born on 1 August 1975, in Bærum Torp is the daughter of Norwegian linguistics professor Arne Torp.

== Career ==
Torp had her first film appearance in The Woman of My Life (2003). She has received Amanda Awards for her performances as Trude Eriksen in Svarte penger, hvite løgner (TV, 2004), as Nina Skåtøy in the film Gymnaslærer Pedersen (2006), and for her supporting role in Lønsj.

Torp was named a "Shooting Star" at the Berlin Film Festival in 2006. She also starred in Uro (2006), and played the role Gisela in the Norwegian/Swedish action television series Code Name Hunter (Kodenavn Hunter, 2007), for which she won the Gullruten award for best female actor in 2007.

She has a major role in the Norwegian political thriller TV series Occupied (2015–2020), and stars in the films The Quake (2018) and Charter (2020).

== Personal life ==
On 20 October 2007, she married jazz trumpeter Sjur Miljeteig. They live in Oslo and have two children.

== Filmography ==
- Fire høytider (2000) (as Hanne Åsland) (mini TV Series) (Won 2001 Amanda Award for Best TV Drama)
- Anolit (2002) (as Jane) (Won "European Grand Prix" Award at " Brest European Short Film Festival " 2003)
- Kvinnen i mitt liv (2003) (as Nina) (Nominated for the 2004 Emden Film Award)
- Mors Elling (2003) (as Stewardess)
- Svarte penger, hvite løgner (2004) (as Trude Eriksen) (TV Series) (Won 2004 Amanda Awards for "Best TV Drama" and "Best Actress": Ane Dahl Torp)
- Hos Martin (as shop assistant) (TV-series, one episode, 2004)
- Pappa (2004)
- Ikke naken (2004) (as Nora) (Won awards both at "Lübeck Nordic Film Days 2004", "Berlin International Film Festival 2005" and "Newport International Film Festival 2005")
- De vanskeligste ordene i verden (2005) (as the woman)
- Gymnaslærer Pedersen (2006) (as Nina Skåtøy)
- Uro (2006) (as Mette)
- Kodenavn Hunter (2007) (as Gisela Søderlund a.k.a. Kikki) (mini TV Series)
- Radiopiratene (2007) (as Mamma Grannemann)
- Dead Snow (2009) (as Sara Henriksen)
- Kong Curling (2011) (as Trine Kristine)
- Gnade (2012) (as Linda)
- Pioneer (2013)
- 1001 Grams (2014)
- The Wave (2015)
- Occupied (2015–2020)
- The Quake (2018)
- Charter (2020)
- Blinded (Fartblinda) (2022)
- Deliver Me (2024)
- Dreams (Sex Love) (Drømmer 2024), It will have its International premiere in February 2025, as part of the 75th Berlin International Film Festival, in Competition.
- Stayer (2024)
- The Ugly Stepsister (2025, Premiere at the 2025 Sundance Film Festival on 23 January.)

== Awards ==
- Amanda Award 2008: Best Supporting Actress (for Lønsj, 2008)
- Amanda Award 2004: Best Actress (for: Svarte penger, hvite løgner, 2004)
- Amanda Award 2006: Best Actress (for: Gymnaslærer Pedersen, 2006)
- Gullruten Award 2007: Best female actor (for: Kodenavn Hunter, 2007)
- Gullruten Award 2018: Best female actor (for: Heimebane, 2018).

Awards
Preceded by Heidi Gjermundsen Broch	Hedda Award for Best Actress; 2012	Succeeded by Gisken Armand
Preceded by Marie Blokhus	Hedda Award for Best Actress; 2016	Succeeded by Nina Ellen Ødegård
