= Trond Berg-Nilssen =

Norwegian television director

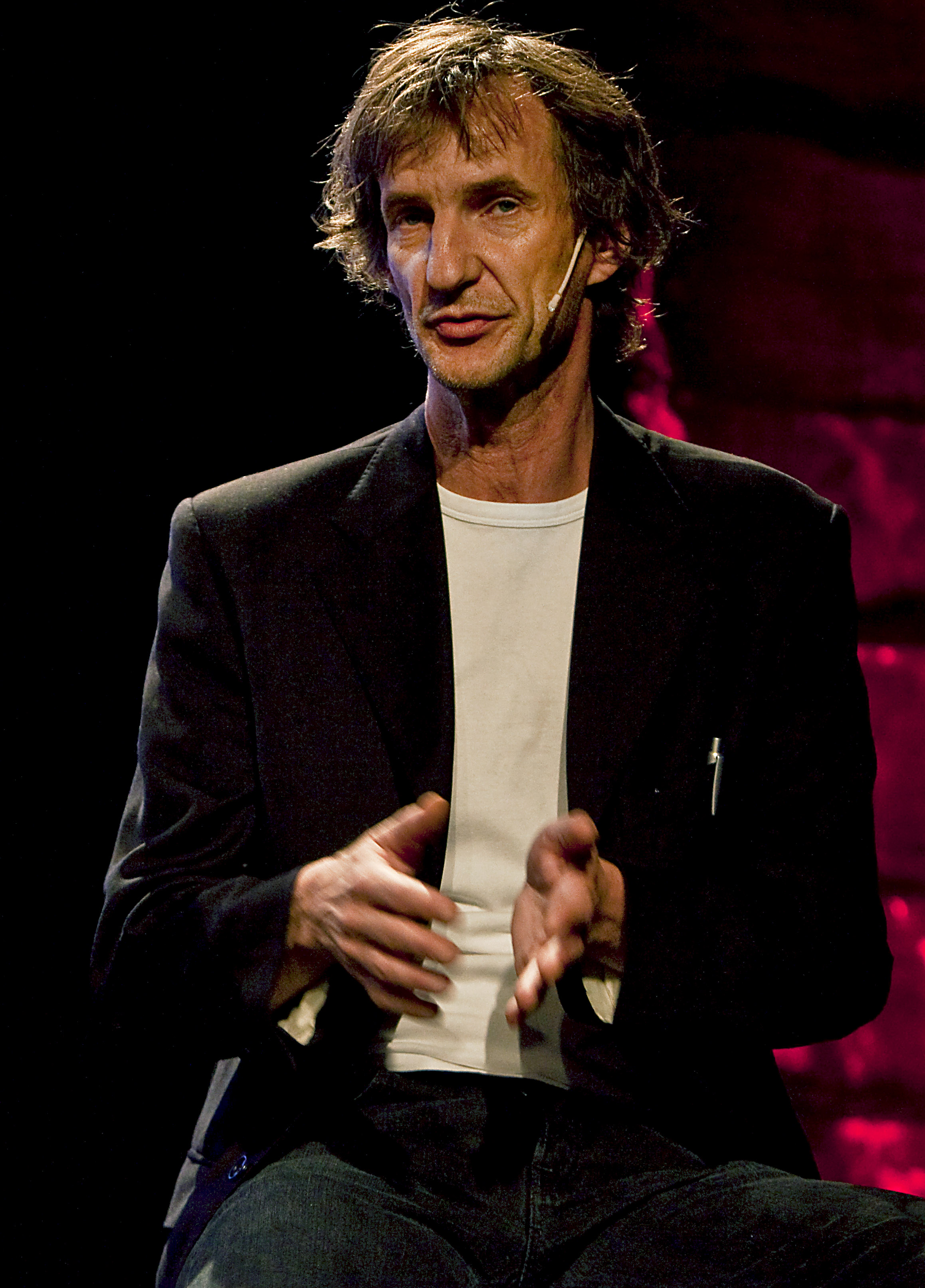
Trond Berg Nilssen, 2011

Trond Berg-Nilssen is a Norwegian creator, producer, and director of drama series for television and the internet. He is best known for the series Lilyhammer (NRK/Netflix), Hotel Caesar (Scandinavia's longest running TV-series with more than 3000 episodes), The Unit (Spesialenheten), and the prize winning series Hvaler (Maria). He started his career winning an award for best music video Norway (1985) for " The Bells are ringing for you now".
