= Amanda Award =

Annual Norwegian film award

- Awarded for: Excellence in Norwegian film.
- Country: Norway
- Presented by: Norwegian International Film Festival
- First award: 1985
- Website: Official website

The Amanda Award (Norwegian: Amandaprisen) is an award given annually at the Norwegian International Film Festival in Haugesund, Norway, to promote and improve Norwegian film. The award originated in 1985, and has since 2005 been exclusively a film award (not television). Winners are awarded a trophy by the Norwegian sculptor Kristian Kvakland, and the name—and theme—of the sculpture comes from a legendary 1920s local woman, Amanda Sofie from Haugesund. The award ceremony is marked every year by a major, nationally televised event.

== History ==
The Amanda Award was instituted in 1985 as part of the Norwegian International Film Festival "to increase the quality of and further the interest for Norwegian films". The year 1993 marked an exception to the norm, when the so-called "Nordic Amanda" included contribution from all the Nordic countries. From 2005 onwards, TV-drama was no longer included among the categories honoured, as the TV-specific award "Gullruten" had taken over this function. Instead the award became exclusively for films. Around the same time another change occurred also. Since the beginning, the award ceremony had been produced in cooperation with the Norwegian state broadcasting corporation Norsk rikskringkasting (NRK). In 2006, however, NRK ended the partnership, and the show has since that time been the responsibility of the private broadcasting company TV 2.

In the year 2007, a "People's Amanda" ("Folkets Amanda") was awarded for the first time, where the winner was arrived at by popular vote. The first winner of the award was the horror movie Fritt Vilt, directed by Roar Uthaug.

== Sculpture ==
The name "Amanda" is derived from a song, or sea shanty, titled "Amanda fra [from] Haugesund". Supposedly the song in turn refers to a real woman from the 1920s – a single mother who made a living from selling liquor to sailors during the prohibition period.

The figurine that is awarded to prize winners originated from a competition held by the local newspaper Haugesunds Avis in 1985, to create a sculpture of the legendary Amanda. The competition was won by Kristian Kvakland from Nesodden in Akershus. The full-size sculpture now stands outside the newspaper's office, but a miniature version was adopted as a trophy for the Amanda Award. The figurine is 30 cm (11.81 in) tall, with a skirt measuring 14 cm (5.51 in) in diameter. While the current sculpture is hollow and weighs 2.5 kg (5.51 lbs), for the first few years it was made of solid metal. Weighing in at 4.5 kg (9.92 lbs) it was difficult to hoist for many winners.

It was one of these prizes that, in the year 1986, was won by director Anja Breien, who decided to sell it through a newspaper advert, as a protest against that year's budget cuts for Norwegian film. The Swedish Film Institute, which had experienced similar cuts and sympathized, bought the sculpture. In 2005, as Breien was presented with an honorary award, she was also given back the original sculpture by former Minister of Culture and director of the Swedish Film Institute, Åse Kleveland.

== Show ==
The award show has long been a central point of the film festival, as well as a major television event for the whole of Norway. Particularly in earlier years, international stars were sometimes brought in to enhance the prestige of the event. Examples of this are Roger Moore, who was a special guest at the first ceremony in 1985, and Diana Ross in 1987, then married to Norwegian entrepreneur Arne Næss, Jr. Other international names appearing in the show as presenters have included Ned Beatty, Lauren Bacall, Jon Voight, Brian Cox, Jeremy Irons, Ben Kingsley and Pierce Brosnan.

The show has in recent years been hosted by prominent Norwegian comedians. Jon Almaas, known from the TV-show Nytt på nytt, played host for several years in the early 2000s. Thomas Giertsen, known as a stand-up comedian and from several TV-shows, has hosted the show in recent years. An episode that received some media attention in 2005 was when host Marit Åslein and Minister of Culture and Church Affairs from the Christian conservative party KrF, Valgerd Svarstad Haugland, kissed on stage as part of a humorous routine.

== Awards and winners ==
The only actor ever to have won four Amanda Awards is Bjørn Sundquist. These were awarded for the movies Over grensen (1987), Søndagsengler (1996) and Sejer - se deg ikke tilbake (2000), as well as an Honorary Award in 2000. Ane Dahl Torp has won three awards for specific acting roles: she won Best Actress for her roles in Svarte penger - hvite løgner (2004) and Gymnaslærer Pedersen (2006), and was the first ever to receive the newly created award for Best Actress in a Supporting Role for her effort in Lønsj in 2008. Sverre Anker Ousdal has also been named Best Actor twice, for Kreditorene in 1990 and Blodsbånd in 1998, and won the Honorary Award in 2009. Nils Ole Oftebro, Espen Skjønberg and Anneke von der Lippe have all been honoured twice each – Oftebro and Skjønberg once as lead actors and once as supporting actors. Among the directors, Ola Solum, Nils Gaup, Berit Nesheim and Bent Hamer have each received two awards. Erik Gustavson has the rare distinction of having won in three different categories: for best film and best documentary, in addition to winning the special "Nordic Amanda" in 1993. This is an accomplishment Kjersti Holmen can also claim, for winning the Best Actress award in 2000, Best Supporting Role in 1993, and the Honorary Award in 2009. The only film to have won the three main awards – best film, best actor and best actress – is Budbringeren in 1997.

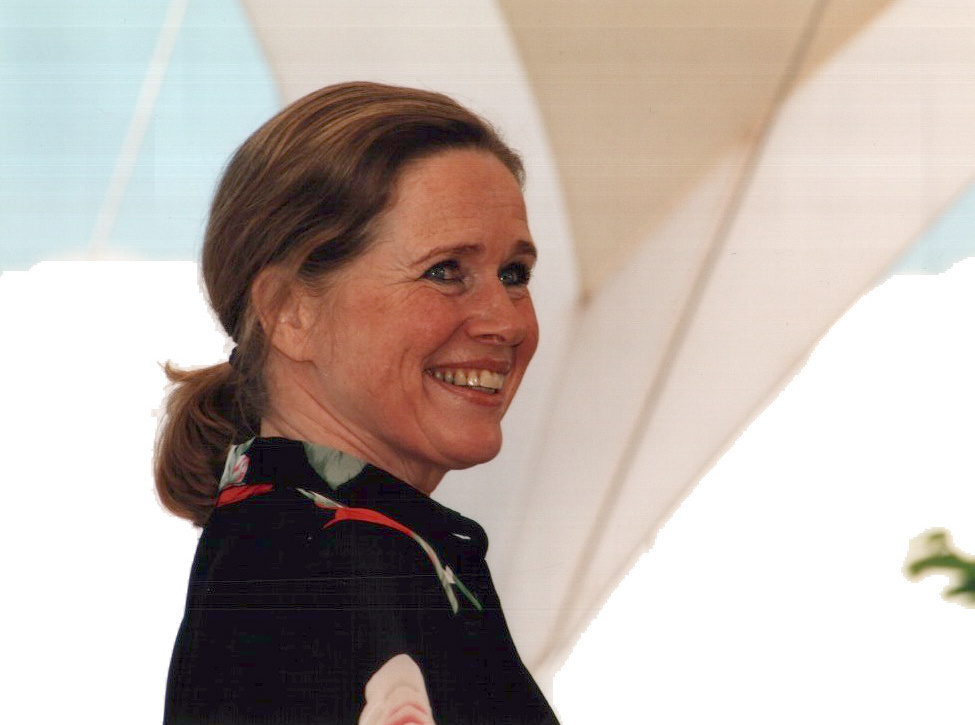
Actress Liv Ullmann is the Honorary President of the Norwegian International Film Festival, and was awarded the Honorary Amanda in 1992.

As of 2010, the categories awarded are:

- Best Norwegian Film in Theatrical Release
- Best Director (for films in theatrical release)
- The People’s Amanda (audience vote)
- Best Actor
- Best Actress
- Best Actor in a Supporting Role
- Best Actress in a Supporting Role
- Best Children’s and Youth Film
- Best Original Screenplay
- Best Cinematography
- Best Sound Design
- Best Music
- Best Editing
- Best Production Design / Scenography
- Best Visual Effects
- Best Short Film
- Best Documentary
- The foreign film of the year in Theatrical Release
- The Amanda Committee's Golden Clapper (technical award)
- The Amanda Committee's Honorary Award
