= I kveld med YLVIS =

Norwegian talk show (2011-2016)

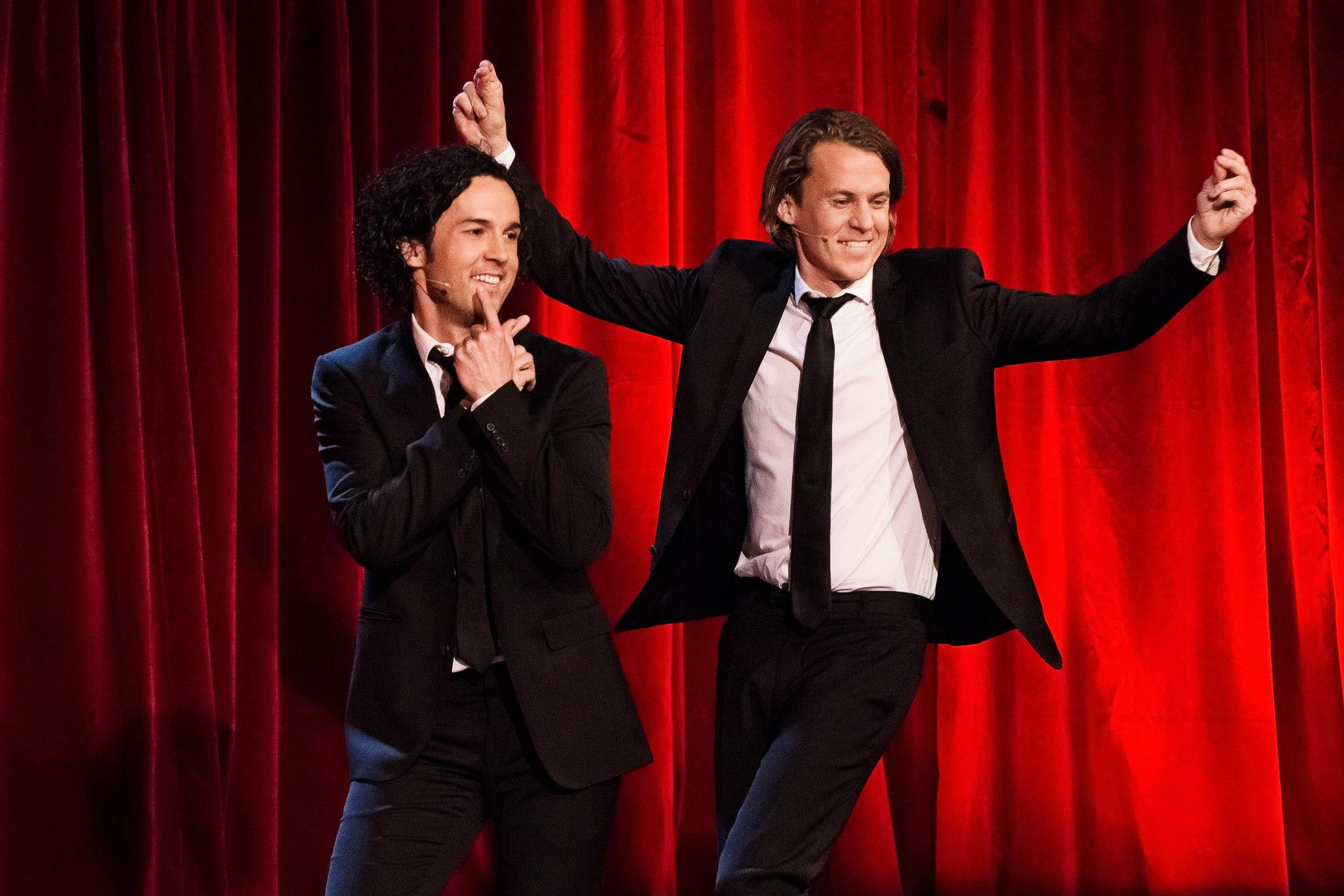
- Created by: Bård Ylvisåker, Vegard Ylvisåker
- Written by: Bård Ylvisåker, Vegard Ylvisåker, Calle Hellevang-Larsen, Magnus Devold.
- Directed by: Ole Martin Hafsmo, Christian Holm-Glad, Morten Skogdal
- Starring: Bård Ylvisåker, Vegard Ylvisåker, Calle Hellevang-Larsen, Magnus Devold
- Country of origin: Norway
- Original languages: Norwegian; English
- No. of seasons: 5

Production
- Production locations: Riksscenen, Oslo (season 1-3), Folketeatret, Oslo (season 4-5).
- Production companies: Funkerhauser Productions (season 1), Concorde TV (season 2-5)

Original release
- Network: TVNorge
- Release: September 19, 2011 – March 15, 2016

I kveld med YLVIS ("Tonight with Ylvis") is a Norwegian talk show hosted by Bård and Vegard Ylvisåker, with Calle Hellevang-Larsen as a permanent sidekick. During season 2, Calle was replaced by David Batra due to obligations he had made with his comedy group Raske Menn and their show on the rival channel TV2. Magnus Devold is also a permanent part of the show and often contributes with several segments per show.

The show has several regular segments like "Hyss i Småland" (Pranks in Småland) where they do various pranks dressed as 19th century farmers, mimicking the style of Emil i Lönneberga, and "Kan dette brukes som vann-ski?" ("Can this be used as waterskis?").

== Production ==
The first season of the show was produced by Funkerhauser Productions, a company owned by comedians Harald Eia and Bård Tufte Johansen, who also have a show on the same channel. In the spring of 2012 the Ylvis-brothers and their manager Jørgen Thue started the production company Concorde TV, which produced seasons 2, 3 and 4 of the show. The first 3 seasons of I kveld med Ylvis were taped at Riksscenen in Oslo with a live audience. Starting with season 4 the show is broadcast live from the Folketeatret in Oslo.

== Regular skits ==
"Voice-controlled" elevators, and ATMs
Bård and Vegard use microphones and a keyboard to mimic the sound of a digital voice, controlling various stuff like ATMs and elevators. Often they use quizzes or deliberately misunderstand various words or numbers, like in the amount the customer wants withdrawn. The skit has become a favorite and also gained popularity as viral video, with many countries asking for rights to the skit. This was a continuation of a segment they once did called "Radio-Taxi", where passengers would hear improvised songs about themselves on the radio.

"Trapped in IKEA"
Using a fake room that slides in front of the door, random people get trapped in IKEA exhibits. An accomplice also hides in a closet, and goes out pretending like there is nothing changed, and then disappears back into the closet. After a while the fake room is removed, and often the accomplice gets asked to show where the exit is, and then shows them the newly reopened door. The fake room has also contained a man "using" the toilet once.

Big in-
Two series has featured the boys trying to make it big in various places in the world for comic effect. First they tried to make it big in Kyrgyzstan and ended with appearances on national television in a morning show. The song "Janym" gained mild popularity in Kyrgyzstan, and a slight revival amongst Russian speakers after the success of "The Fox". In season 3 Bård, Vegard, and eventually Magnus tried to make it big as actors in Swahiliwood, a large sub-Saharan movie industry, calculating that they could reach out to hundreds of millions of potential viewers. In the end the boys were invited to introduce an award in the Swahiliwood equivalent of the Academy awards.

== Reception ==
Season 1 of the talk show received good reviews and the premiere attracted 458,000 viewers, whilst the second series only attracted 341,000 viewers on the premiere. The third series set a record with 534,000 viewers, well helped by the success of "The Fox".

I kveld med Ylvis was awarded with the best show TV/Film at the Norwegian Comedy Awards 2012.

== List of episodes ==
=== Season 1 ===
Average viewership: 334,000

| Episode | Date | Guestlist | Note |
|---|---|---|---|
| 1 | 19 September 2011 | Thomas Giertsen and Anna Anka | "Work it" |
| 2 | 21 September 2011 | Linn Skåber and Thomas Seltzer | |
| 3 | 26 September 2011 | Sigrid Bonde Tusvik and Jaysuma Saidy Ndure | |
| 4 | 28 September 2011 | Atle Antonsen and Katzenjammer | |
| 5 | 3 October 2011 | Kristoffer Joner and Jonas Gardell | |
| 6 | 5 October 2011 | Madcon and Joe Labero | |
| 7 | 10 October 2011 | Tone Damli and Aleksander Schau | |
| 8 | 12 October 2011 | Hege Schøyen and Jo Røislien | |
| 9 | 17 October 2011 | Fabian Stang and Christina Vukicevic | |
| 10 | 19 October 2011 | Terje Sporsem and Jan Gunnar Røise | |
| 11 | 24 October 2011 | Sondre Lerche and Else Kåss Furuseth | |
| 12 | 26 October 2011 | Erlend Loe and Gabrielle Leithaug | |
| 13 | 31 October 2011 | Bare Egil and Live Nelvik | |
| 14 | 2 November 2011 | Davy Wathne and Maya Vik | |
| 15 | 7 November 2011 | Maria Mena and Knut Jørgen Røed Ødegaard | |
| 16 | 9 November 2011 | Hans Olav Brenner and Jenny Skavlan | |
| 17 | 14 November 2011 | Kristoffer Schau and Kristin Halvorsen | |
| 18 | 16 November 2011 | Kurt Nilsen and Mariann Thomassen | |

=== Season 2 ===
Average viewership: 247,000

| Episode | Date | Guestlist | Note |
|---|---|---|---|
| 1 | 12 September 2012 | Steinar Sagen, Tore Sagen, Bjarte Tjøstheim and Viktoria Winge | 341,000 viewers |
| 2 | 16 September 2012 | Espen Eckbo and LidoLido | |
| 3 | 19 September 2012 | Lillian Müller and The Pajama Men | |
| 4 | 23 September 2012 | Zahid Ali, Mudasser Kahn and Andreas Wahl | |
| 5 | 26 September 2012 | Erik Solbakken and Ingrid Bolsø Berdal | |
| 6 | 30 September 2012 | Anders Baasmo Christiansen and Ezinne Okparaebo | |
| 7 | 3 October 2012 | John Brungot, Magnus Eliassen and Erik Eliassen | |
| 8 | 7 October 2012 | Alex Rosén and Alexandra Joner | |
| 9 | 10 October 2012 | Karpe Diem and Josephine Bornebusch | |
| 10 | 14 October 2012 | Cecilia Brækhus and Kåre Magnus Bergh | |
| 11 | 17 October 2012 | Pia Tjelta and Aslak Nore | |
| 12 | 21 October 2012 | Petter Schjerven and Leo Ajkic | |
| 13 | 24 October 2012 | Jon Øigarden and Are Sende Osen | |
| 14 | 28 October 2012 | Marte Stokstad and Kriss Kaspersen | |
| 15 | 31 October 2012 | Eyvind Hellstrøm and Admiral P | |
| 16 | 4 November 2012 | Harald Eia, Bård Tufte Johansen and Åse Kleveland | |
| 17 | 7 November 2012 | Trond-Viggo Torgersen and Agnes Kittelsen | |
| 18 | 11 November 2012 | Bernt Apeland, Didrik Solli-Tangen, Charlotte Thorstvedt and Jan Egeland | UNICEF special |
| 19 | 14 November 2012 | Dagfinn Lyngbø and Anne Sandvik Lindmo | |

=== Season 3 ===
Calle Hellevang Larsen returned as the brothers' sidekick.

Average viewership: 324,000

| Episode | Date | Guestlist | Note |
|---|---|---|---|
| 1 | 10 September 2013 | Pernille Sørensen, Bas Lansdorp and Alfred Sandvig | Viewer-record: 534,000 viewers |
| 2 | 12 September 2013 | Henriette Steenstrup and Roger Antonsen | |
| 3 | 17 September 2013 | Tommy Steine and Sandra Lyng Haugen | |
| 4 | 19 September 2013 | Einar Tørnquist and Petter Bøckman | |
| 5 | 24 September 2013 | Ingrid Olava and Kristian Valen | |
| 6 | 26 September 2013 | Christian Ringnes and Harald Eia | |
| 7 | 1 October 2013 | Per Kristian Thorsland, Per Heimly, Ari Behn and Mariann Hole | |
| 8 | 3 October 2013 | Little Steven, Ronny Brede Aase and Live Nelvik | |
| 9 | 8 October 2013 | Solveig Kloppen, Steinar Ofsdal, Rune Nilsson and Per Olav Alvestad | |
| 10 | 10 October 2013 | Lars Vaular and Charter-Svein | |
| 11 | 15 October 2013 | Hasse Hope, Erik Solbakken and Truls Heggero | |
| 12 | 17 October 2013 | Knut Nærum and Ellen Blinkenberg | |
| 13 | 22 October 2013 | Thomas Dybdahl and Siri Kristiansen | |
| 14 | 24 October 2013 | Maria Mena and Bertolt Meyer | |
| 15 | 29 October 2013 | Atle Antonsen, Johan Golden and Selda Ekiz | |
| 16 | 31 October 2013 | Dag O. Hessen and Bård Tufte Johansen | |
| 17 | 5 November 2013 | Odd Nordstoga and Ole André Sivertsen | |
| 18 | 7 November 2013 | Ane Dahl Torp and Bjørn Eidsvåg | |
| 19 | 12 November 2013 | Bernt Apeland, Hege-Anette Havik, Anne Havik Henriksen, Petter Schjerven and Jens Stoltenberg | UNICEF special |
| 20 | 14 November 2013 | | Best of season 3, part 1 |
| 21 | 19 November 2013 | | Best of season 3, part 2 |

=== Season 4 ===
Average viewership: 442,000 (viewership record)

| Episode | Date | Guestlist | Note |
|---|---|---|---|
| 1 | 16 September 2014 | Erna Solberg | 432,000 viewers |
| 2 | 23 September 2014 | Morten Ramm | 403,000 viewers |
| 3 | 30 September 2014 | Marion Ravn | Special guest in the band: Elvis Costello |
| 4 | 7 October 2014 | Jakob Oftebro | |
| 5 | 14 October 2014 | Ingrid Gjessing Linhave | Calle dances tango with Simen Agdestein; Opera group Reza e i Ragazzi sings during Gullsjansen |
| 6 | 21 October 2014 | Fredrik Skavlan | |
| 7 | 28 October 2014 | Erik Thorstvedt and Svein Tore Østvik (Charter-Svein) | |
| 8 | 4 November 2014 | Steinar Sagen | |
| 9 | 11 November 2014 | Einar Tørnquist | |
| 10 | 18 November 2014 | Thomas Numme, Harald Rønneberg and Kygo | |
| 11 | 25 November 2014 | Bernt Apeland, Cecilie Skog, Magnus & Bjørn Skredderberget, and Jarle Andhøy | UNICEF special |
| 12 | 9 December 2014 | | Best of season 4, part 1 |
| 13 | 16 December 2014 | | Best of season 4, part 2 |

=== Season 5 ===
On 4 June 2015 Ylvis announced on their official Facebook page, that a new season would start in the fall.

| Episode | Date | Guestlist | Note |
|---|---|---|---|
| 0 | 22 December 2015 | Tom Stiansen, Vibeke Klemetsen, Bernt G. Apeland, and Jonas Gahr Støre | UNICEF special |
| 1 | 5 January 2016 | Susanne Sundfør | "a capella" |
| 2 | 12 January 2016 | Jarle Bernhoft | |
| 3 | 19 January 2016 | Stian Blipp | "Old Friends" |
| 4 | 26 January 2016 | Selda Ekiz | |
| 5 | 2 February 2016 | Tore Sagen | |
| 6 | 9 February 2016 | Bjørn Kjos | |
| 7 | 16 February 2016 | Vidar Magnussen | Ylvek special |
| 8 | 23 February 2016 | Kjersti Buaas, Andreas Ygre Wiig | Y-Games |
| 9 | 1 March 2016 | Jon Almaas | "Engine for Gabriel" |
| 10 | 8 March 2016 | Ine Jansen | |
| 11 | 15 March 2016 | Ronny Brede Aase | "Language of Love" |
