= Presten =

- Genre: Mockumentary
- Created by: Bjarte Tjøstheim
- Written by: Bjarte Tjøstheim; Vidar Josdal
- Directed by: Vidar Josdal
- Starring: Bjarte Tjøstheim; Marika Enstad; Christian Skolmen; Hannah Marie Carding; Tone Mostraum; Steinar Sagen; Tore Sagen; Kim Haugen; Bjørn Eidsvåg
- Country of origin: Norway
- Original language: Norwegian
- No. of seasons: 2
- No. of episodes: 12 (6+6)

Production
- Running time: 28–32 minutes

Original release
- Network: NRK
- Release: 7 January 2017 – 14 April 2018

Presten (English: The Priest) is a Norwegian mockumentary series that premiered in 2017 on NRK.

The series is based on Bjarte Tjøstheim—creator, co-writer and protagonist—who experienced a bloodclot in real life. In a parallel universe, the health issues leads him to quit his radio show Radioresepsjonen as he is offered the job as vicar of Maridalen Church by the bishop of Oslo (played by Per Gørvell). His only qualification is being the son of a priest (as in real life). The rest of the cast include his new church colleagues, his former Radioresepsjonen colleagues, his wife Kristin (played by Tone Mostraum) and friends Kim Haugen and Bjørn Eidsvåg.

At the premiere, the series was given a "die throw" of 5 in Filmfront and 4 in VG. Åshild Mathiesen in the Christian newspaper Vårt Land saw Tjøstheim's character as very unrealistic.
