= Radio P3 =

Radio P3 may refer to:

- DR P3, Danish radio station
- NRK P3, Norwegian radio station
- NRK P3 Pyro, Norwegian internet-based music radio station
- Sveriges Radio P3, Swedish radio station

== See also ==
- P3 (disambiguation)
