= Massachusetts (disambiguation) =

Massachusetts is a state in the northeastern United States.

Massachusetts may also refer to:

== History ==
- Massachusett, the indigenous population after which the Massachusetts Bay Colony was named
- Massachusetts Bay Colony (1629–1692)
- Province of Massachusetts Bay (1692–1776)

== Music ==
- Massachusetts (Lori McKenna album), 2013
- Massachusetts (Scud Mountain Boys album) or the title song, 1996
- "Massachusetts" (Arlo Guthrie song), 1976; official folk song of Massachusetts
- "Massachusetts" (Bee Gees song), 1967
- "Massachusetts" (Ylvis song), 2013
- Massachusetts (Andy Razaf), 1942, Gene Krupa song written by Andy Razaf and Luckey Roberts, with Anita O'Day as singer; successful cover by Maxine Sullivan
- Massachusetts (Aaron Lewis song), 2011
- "Massachusetts (Because of You Our Land is Free)", written by Bernard Davidson; official patriotic song of Massachusetts
- "The State of Massachusetts", a song by the Dropkick Murphys, 2007 from the album The Meanest of Times
- "Massachusetts", a song by Silverstein from This Is How the Wind Shifts, 2013
- "Massachusetts", a song performed by The Four Vagabonds, 1942
- "Massachusetts", a song by Reks from The Greatest X, 2016

== Other uses ==
- USS Massachusetts, a name shared by several ships of the United States Navy
- 4547 Massachusetts, an asteroid
- The Massachusetts, a historic apartment building in Indianapolis, Indiana, US

== See also ==
- Massachusett language
- Massachusett dialects
- University of Massachusetts, the entire University of Massachusetts system of schools
  - University of Massachusetts Amherst, the flagship and largest campus of the University of Massachusetts system
- Massachusetts Avenue (disambiguation), streets named after Massachusetts
- Fort Massachusetts (disambiguation), various military installations
- Massachusetts Heights, Washington, D.C.
