= A capella (Ylvis song) =

"a capella"

Single by Ylvis
- Released: January 5, 2016
- Length: 3:52
- Label: Discovery Networks Norway
- Songwriter(s): Vegard Ylvisåker, Bård Ylvisåker, Christian Loechstoeer, Lars Bleiklie Devik

"a capella" is a song and music video by the Norwegian duo Ylvis. It parodies a cappella groups like Pentatonix. Ylvis revealed "a capella" on I kveld med YLVIS on TVNorge on January 5, 2016. Three days after the song's release, it had 250,000 views.

== Music video ==
Ylvis revealed the music video and song "a capella" on I kveld med YLVIS on TVNorge on January 5, 2016. It parodies a cappella groups like Pentatonix. In the music video, a small boy is bullied. Ylvis brothers Vegard and Bård Ylvisåker head an a cappella group that attempts to save and galvanize the bullied child through their singing and joyful facial expressions. They are able to defeat the bullies because they have the "scary" talent of being capable of "sing[ing] a song in any musical style".

Caricaturing rousing a cappella songs, the song exploits frequent a cappella customs such as fake words, grinning "like you know Jesus personally", and a male beatboxer. The song includes rock and rap, and a cappella members make trumpet and drum sounds. One of Ylvis' fictional words is "Boodelooap", a fictional Nigerian soft drink. Boodelooap is cherry-red and stored in a long tall bottle.

== Critical reception ==
L.V. Anderson of Slate wrote that the song was "a pitch-perfect spoof of self-serious a cappella groups like Pentatonix". Anderson noted that "purists" could argue that the song is not "strictly" a cappella because it likely has had electronic music components added after production though "that's not really the point".

Entertainment Weekly's Dylan Kickham said the song was "fairly timely" because a cappella is "still very much in the public eye". Kickham cited three examples of a cappella's high visibility: Pentatonix is drawing large crowds, Pitch Slapped opened on TV network Lifetime, and the Pitch Perfect franchise is making Pitch Perfect 3.

Time's Olivia B. Waxman said the song was "aca-awesome". Hoai-Tran Bu wrote in USA Today that the song was "a spot-on parody of a cappella groups that is both amazing and odd". She praised their performance for "delv[ing] into just what makes a cappella cool", citing the combating of bullying, the singing like they personally know Jesus, and props like leather straps and matching woolen hats.

Jojo Girard of WFGR called the song a "a weird tribute to a capella groups" that was "wonderful". KBMX's Tony Hart said the music video was "a funny look" at a cappella groups, noting "[t]his parody is perfect, right down to the reference to the leather straps these groups always seem to wear, and what's with all the smiling?" KSL's John Clyde praised the song for being "pretty darn catchy and incredibly clever".
