= NRK Oslofjord =

Norwegian digital radio station

Coordinates: 59°56′07″N 10°43′07″E

NRK Oslofjord (also known as NRK P1 Oslofjord) was a Norwegian digital radio channel operated by NRK.

It was derived from NRK P1 and targeting a slightly younger demographic than the main station.

== History ==
Broadcasts started on 13 June 2005 with Øyvind Vasaasen as its director. The goal was to set up a youthful alternative to NRK P1, and that was reflected in its music selection, which matched both the intended demographic and the summer period, drawn in from the NRK P3 and NRK mP3 catalogues. The average listener was 30 years old. At launch time, it had a datbaase of over 5,000 songs, 3,500 of which were from P1 and 850 were from P3. The station took two weeks to build, as it was planned that spring to launch that summer.

The channel was not affected by the 2006 NRK strike and aired in place of NRK P1 over its FM network as a temporary measure on 31 May-1 June.

The station closed on 1 July 2009. In preparation for its closure, its flagship programme The Håvard Sylte Show had its final edition on 8 May.
