= M4SONIC =

- Born: Nick Boundy; 1991 (age 34–35)
- Origin: Adelaide, South Australia, Australia
- Genres: Dubstep; EDM; electro house
- Occupations: music producer; Launchpad Artist
- Years active: 2012–present
- Labels: Ultra Records, Global League
- Website: M4SONIC.com.au

Nick Boundy, better known for his stage name M4SONIC (/ˈɛmˌfɔːˈsɒnɪk/ EM-for-SON-ik), is an Australian electronic music producer, DJ and controllerist who was previously signed to Sony / Ultra Music. He co-produced (with Stargate) the Ylvis comedy song "The Fox (What Does the Fox Say?)".

M4SONIC has toured the United States, Asia, Australia and Europe, performing at festivals such as TomorrowWorld, Life Is Beautiful, Stereosonic and the 2015 Warped Tour.
