= Tinitus (radio show) =

Norwegian heavy metal radio show

Tinitus was a Norwegian metal rock radio show that was broadcast on public broadcaster NRK P3 from 20:00 to 22:00 on Wednesday nights from 2005 to 2009. It showcased both Norwegian and international heavy metal talent and it was hosted by Kirsti Thisland Eggum and produced by Patrizia Pelgrift (nee' Mazzuoccolo).
