= Trucker's Hitch =

Single by Ylvis

from the album Volume 1
- Released: 16 September 2014
- Genre: Dance-pop; electro house; novelty; country
- Length: 3:27 (Album version); 3:23 (Radio edit)
- Songwriter(s): Mikkel Eriksen; Tor Hermansen; Bård Ylvisåker; Vegard Ylvisåker
- Producer(s): Stargate

Ylvis singles chronology
"Massachusetts" (2013)	"Trucker's Hitch" (2014)	"Mr. Toot" (2014)

Music video
- "Trucker's Hitch" on YouTube

"Trucker's Hitch" is a single by the Norwegian duo Ylvis. It was uploaded onto YouTube on September 16, 2014, and had over 22 million views as of January 22, 2020. The song reached number 10 on the charts in Norway. The song was created as a promo for the duo's TV show "I Kveld Med Ylvis".

== Production ==
The brothers Vegard and Bård Ylvisåker, members of the Norwegian comedy group Ylvis, produced the song and music video "Trucker's Hitch" to promote the 4th season of their TV show I kveld med Ylvis on TVNorge. The song was produced by Stargate, who also produced Ylvis' viral hit The Fox (What Does the Fox Say?).

== Live performances ==
Ylvis' first live performance of "Trucker's Hitch" was during their appearance on the Skavlan talk show in Sweden on 19 September 2014. The song was later performed live during concerts given in 2015 in Norway and Sweden as a part of duo's The Expensive Jacket Tour.

== Track listing ==
Digital download
No.	Title	Length
1.	"Trucker's Hitch"	3:27

== Charts ==
Chart (2014)	Peak position
Norway (VG-lista)	10
