= Massachusetts Avenue =

Massachusetts Avenue may refer to:

- Massachusetts Avenue (metropolitan Boston), Massachusetts
  - Massachusetts Avenue (MBTA Orange Line station), a subway station on the MBTA Orange Line
  - Massachusetts Avenue (MBTA Silver Line station), a station on the MBTA Silver Line Washington Street route
  - "Massachusetts Avenue", a song by Amanda Palmer & the Grand Theft Orchestra from the 2012 album Theatre Is Evil
- Massachusetts Avenue (Halifax, Nova Scotia)
- Massachusetts Avenue, Indianapolis, Indiana
- Massachusetts Avenue (San Diego Trolley station), a station on the San Diego Metropolitan Transit System
- Massachusetts Avenue (Washington, D.C.), the longest of the state named streets in Washington, D.C.
  - Massachusetts Avenue Historic District (Washington, D.C.)
  - Embassy Row
- Massachusetts Avenue Historic District (Worcester, Massachusetts)
- Massachusetts Avenue, a street in the game Monopoly

== See also ==
- Massachusetts (disambiguation)
- Massachusetts Street, Lawrence, Kansas
