= Ylvis: Volume I =

Volume I

Studio album by Ylvis
- Released: 19 November 2014
- Recorded: 2014
- Genre: Pop, comedy, electronic
- Label: Universal Music AS
- Producer: Stargate

Ylvis: Volume I is the first album by the comedy duo Ylvis. It consists of 10 songs that Ylvis originally released as singles and then put together into one album. The album was released on 19 November 2014 through Universal Music AS. It peaked at number 24 in Norway.

== Track listing ==
No.	Title	Length
1.	"Intolerant"	3:02
2.	"Yoghurt"	2:54
3.	"Shabby Chic"	3:53
4.	"The Cabin"	4:05
5.	"Mr. Toot"	2:51
6.	"I Will Never Be a Star"	3:32
7.	"Ytterst På Tissen"	2:34
8.	"Massachusetts"	4:35
9.	"Trucker's Hitch"	3:25
10.	"Da vet du at det er jul"	3:11

== Charts ==
Chart (2014)	Peak position
Norwegian Albums (VG-lista)	24
