= Helene Sandvig =

Norwegian journalist

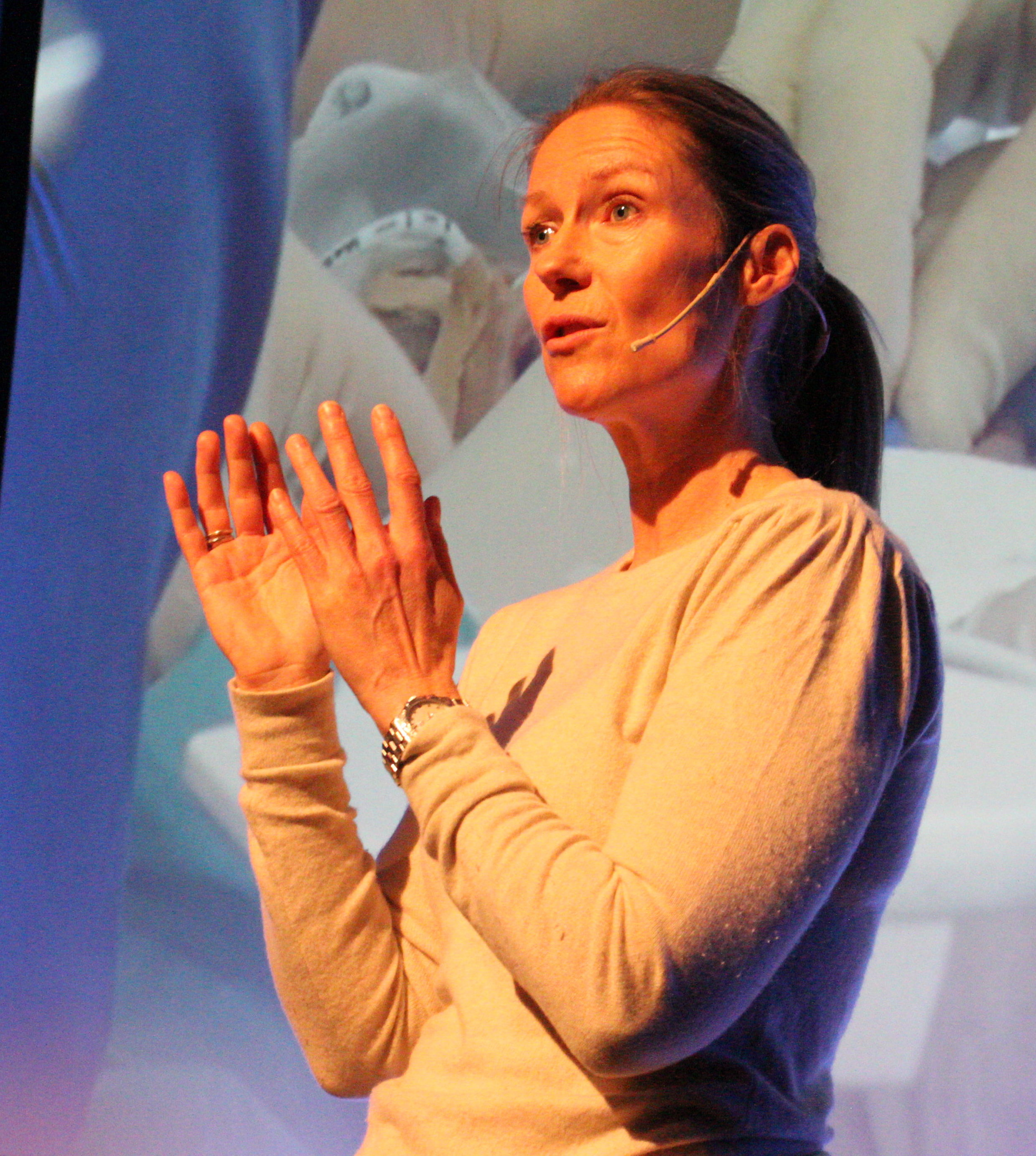
Helene Sandvig, 2019

Helene Beate Sandvig (born August 26, 1968) is a Norwegian journalist. She is a program leader in the Pulse NRK program and has held this position in the periods of 1999–2001, 2006–2008 and since 2010. Prior to this she was a journalist in Dagbladet. In 2016 she directed the program Helene checks in on NRK1. For the program, she was nominated for best female program leader in front of Gullruten 2017. She won the award for the same program in 2018.

She is a graduate of journalism from Volda University College.

Awards
Preceded by Anne Lindmo	Se og Hør's TV Personality of the Year; 2017	Succeeded by
