= Truls Svendsen =

Norwegian television presenter and comedian

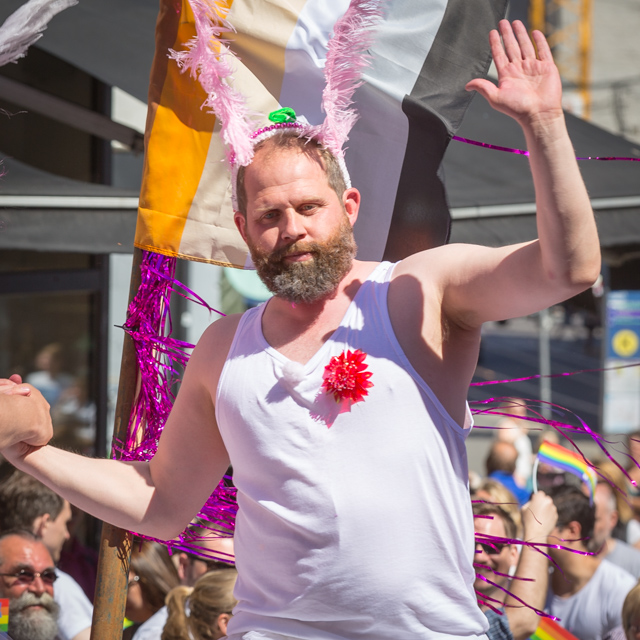
2015.

Truls Svendsen (born 27 September 1972) is a Norwegian television presenter and comedian.

Svendsen grew up in Tromsø, but moved to Oslo in 1993. While attending the BI Norwegian Business School he met Harald Rønneberg. The two started the event firm Plan B, and Svendsen eventually made his television debut as sidekick in Rønneberg and Thomas Numme's Senkveld.

Svendsen soon presented shows for the Norwegian Broadcasting Corporation, including Kroppen and E6 - en reise i nordmenns hverdag. He returned to TV 2 for Svendsen om Hansen og Jensen, Kvelden er din, Truls - oppdrag Hurtigruten and Tjukken og Lillemor. For the latter show, an arctic exploration with Cecilie Skog, he won Se og Hør's TV Personality of the Year award. He earlier won a Gullruten award for TV moment of the year in 2009. He also featured in two seasons of the drama Meglerne (2014 and 2016).

Like the programme with explorer Cecilie Skog, Svendsen followed up with another show where he followed an expert, this time chef Eyvind Hellstrøm in Truls à la Hellstrøm. In 2019 he toured with the stage show Fra Æ til Å, a combined standup, musical and slapstick show.

In 2021, Svendsen appeared on the first season of the singing competition series Norges nye megahit and sang the song "Når julefreden senker seg" with his girlfriend Charlotte Smith, which won and subsequently reached number one on the Norwegian singles chart.

Awards
Preceded by Bård Ylvisåker; Vegard Ylvisåker	Se og Hør's TV Personality of the Year; 2015	Succeeded by Anne Lindmo
