= Kenshi Sugiya =

Japanese baseball player

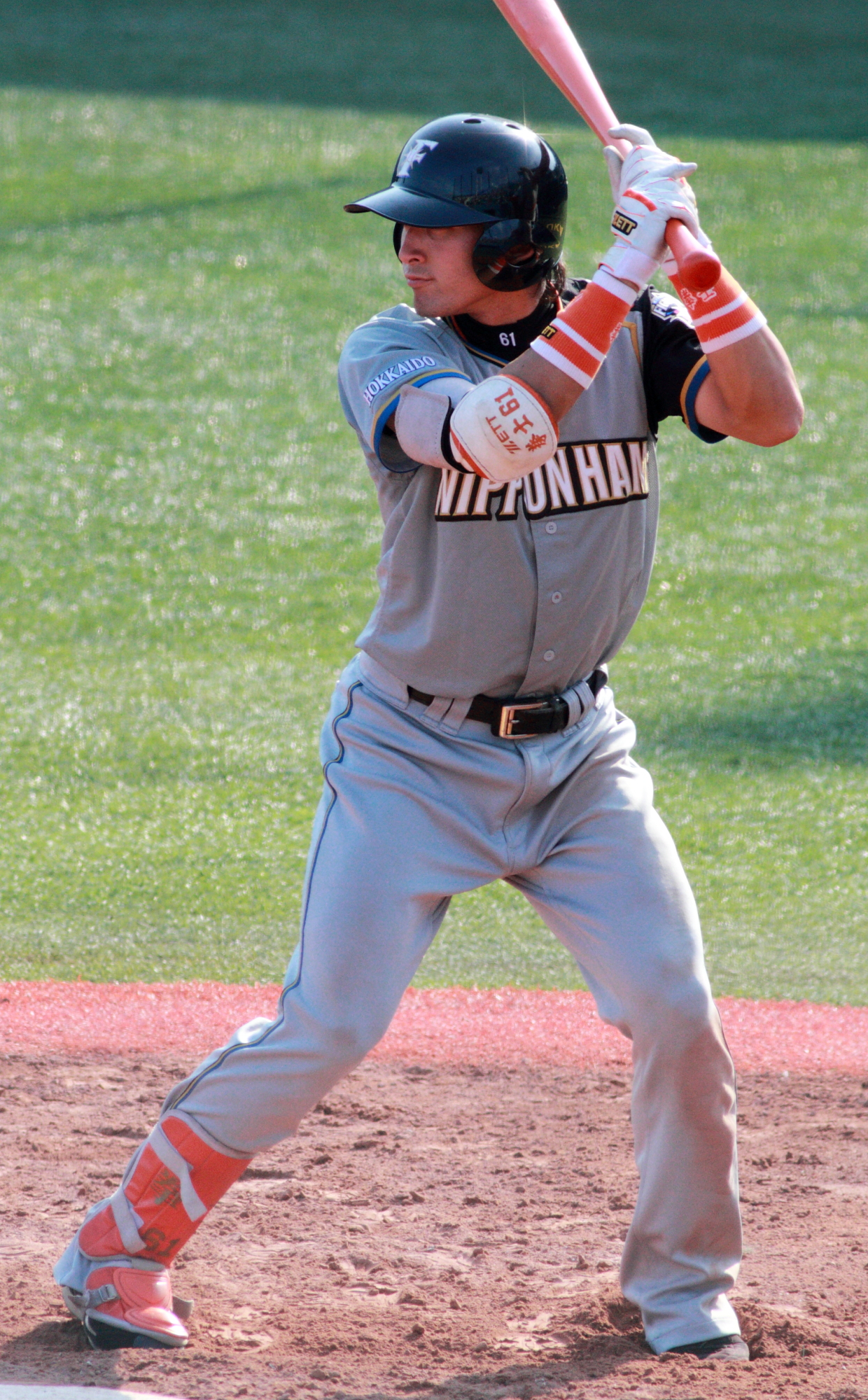
- Sugiya with the Hokkaido Nippon Ham Fighters

Savannah Bananas – No. 61
- Outfielder
- Born: February 4, 1991 (age 35); Tokyo Japan
- Batted: Both Threw: Right

NPB debut
- June 29, 2011, for the Hokkaido Nippon-Ham Fighters

Last NPB appearance
- October 2, 2022, for the Hokkaido Nippon-Ham Fighters

NPB statistics
- Batting average: .212
- Hits: 288
- Home runs: 16
- RBI: 104
- Stolen bases: 50
- Stats at Baseball Reference

Teams
- Hokkaido Nippon-Ham Fighters (2009–2022)

Kenshi Sugiya (杉谷 拳士, Sugiya Kenshi; born February 4, 1991) is a Japanese former professional baseball outfielder. He debuted in 2011 for the Hokkaido Nippon-Ham Fighters, and played in Nippon Professional Baseball (NPB) for the team through the 2022 season.

== Career ==
On December 15, 2017, the Brisbane Bandits announced that Sugiya had signed with the team to play in the Australian Baseball League.

In 2026, Sugiya became an entertainment player for the Savannah Bananas.

== Personal life ==
Sugiya is also featured in a dance video on the Fighters' YouTube channel for The Fox (What Does the Fox Say?) (or referred to as The Fox Dance in marketing) which is currently the 3rd most viewed video on the Fighters' YouTube channel, with over 3.1 million views.
