= Jørgen Strickert =

Norwegian satirist, comedian, broadcaster (born 1980)

Jørgen Strickert (born 28 May 1980 in Trondheim) is a Norwegian satirist, comedian, broadcaster and writer. Strickert was a founding member of the alternative comedy group Opplysningskontoret from 2002 to 2007. From 2007 to June 2009 he worked in the morning radio show P3morgen on NRK P3.

In 2009 Strickert became the host of the long running satirical radio show Hallo i uken on NRK P2. He co-hosted the talk show Salongen from 2014 to 2019, before becoming a freelance broadcaster and dramaturg.
