= NRK P3X =

Former Norwegian internet radio station

- Norway
- Broadcast area: Norway

Programming
- Language: Norwegian Bokmål
- Format: Hip-hop, Norwegian rap and RnB music

Ownership
- Owner: NRK
- Sister stations: P3, mP3, P3 Musikk

History
- First air date: 28 February 2019; 7 years ago
- Last air date: 1 September 2025; 12 months ago

NRK P3X was a radio station from NRK which only aired music, namely hip-hop, Norwegian rap and RnB. It existed from 2019 to 2025.

== History ==
The station was created with the goal of monitoring the music selection up close and updated it weekly if necessary, as well as giving more promotion to the Norwegian musical scene. P3's head of music Daniel Ramberg told Medier24 that the new initiative sought to offer a better variety of hip-hop tracks to P3's listeners. Another part of the initiative was the launch of an interview show presented by Abiel Tesfai. In his new series, Tesfai interviewed several artists from the urban scene in Norway and the rest of the world.

As part of its launch, NRK Radio changed the name of its NRK National Rap Show playlist to NRK P3X, after the new station. However, the radio programme of the same name on NRK P3 continued as it was. Its slogan was "NRK P3X - Alltid en banger!".

NRK P3X closed on 1 September 2025, when NRK P3 Musikk took over.
