= Live Nelvik =

Norwegian actress and radio and television presenter

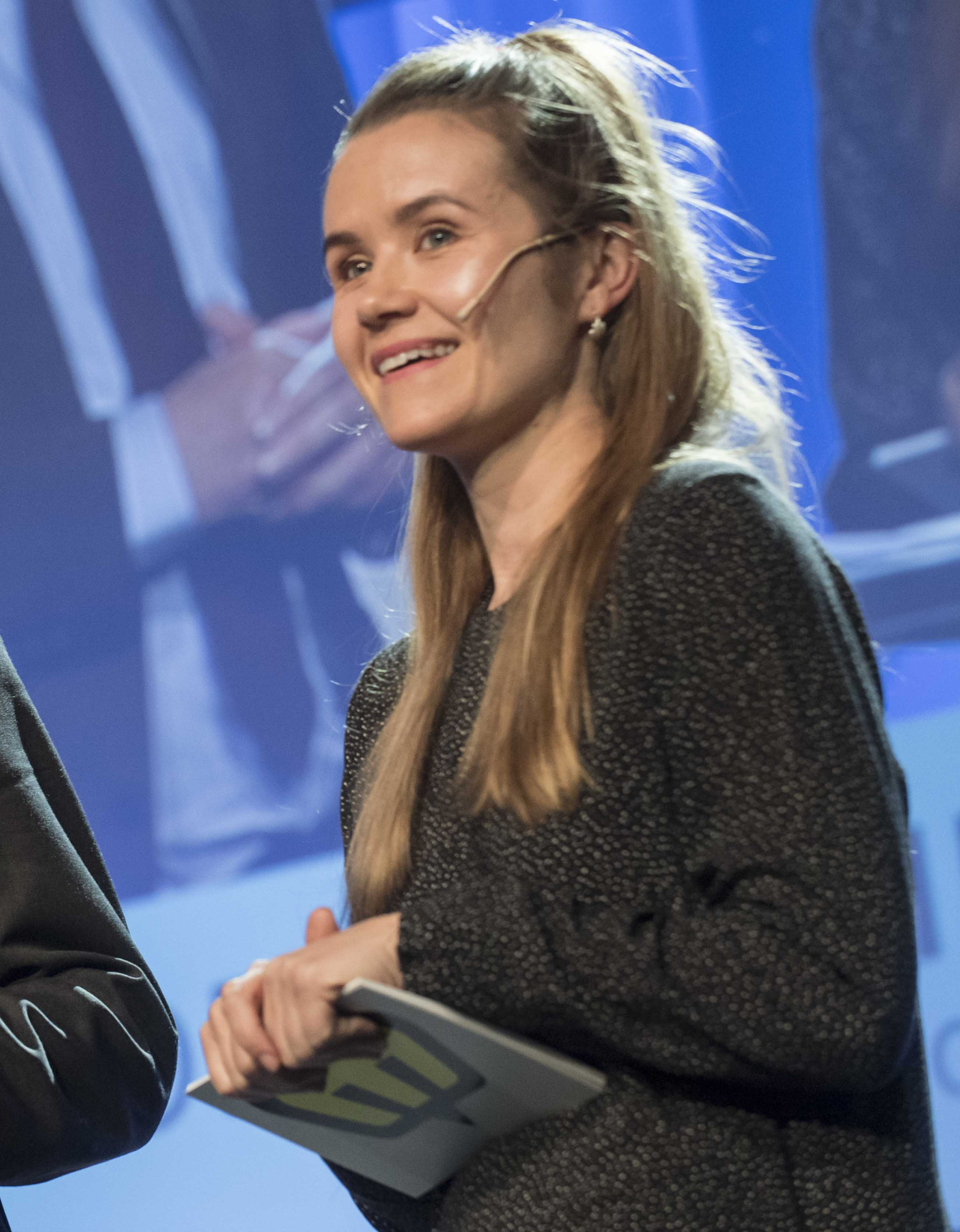
- Born: Live Johnsrud Nelvik; 10 December 1982 (age 43)
- Occupations: Radio presenter; television presenter
- Spouse: Tore Sagen
- Father: Odd Johan Nelvik

Live Johnsrud Nelvik (born 10 December 1982) is a Norwegian radio and television presenter and actress.

She worked as a journalist in Se og Hør and a reporter in the P4 Radio Hele Norge programme Michael direkte (Michael Directly). Along with Kristine Riis Nelvik presented the radio show Drillpikene (Drill Girls) on NRK P3. From 2009 to 2013 she, along with Ronny Brede Aase, presented P3morgen in the same channel.

She was the host of the television programme Dama til (girlfriend to) in NRK3 in 2011. For the programme, she was named Se og Hør's TV Personality of the Year in Gullruten 2012. She was a cast member of the SNL-esque comedy programme Underholdningsavdelingen on NRK1 in 2013. She returned to radio on P3morgen on 12 August 2013, along with Ronny Brede Aase and Silje Nordnes.

As an actress, she played Maria in the film Kalle og englene (Kalle and the Angels), premiered in 1993, and starring Helge Jordal and Tom Beck Letessier. Nelvik participated in the reality television series Farmen in Autumn 2004. She had a small role in the film Hjelp, vi er i filmbransjen (Help, We are in the Film Industry).

She is the daughter of Odd Johan Nelvik who was the editor-in-chief of Se og Hør from 1985 to 2008, and married to radio personality Tore Sagen. Together they have three children.

Awards
| Preceded by | Se og Hør's TV Personality of the Year; 2012 | Succeeded by Bård Ylvisåker; Vegard Ylvisåker |
