= Christian Holm-Glad =

Norwegian film director (born 1976)

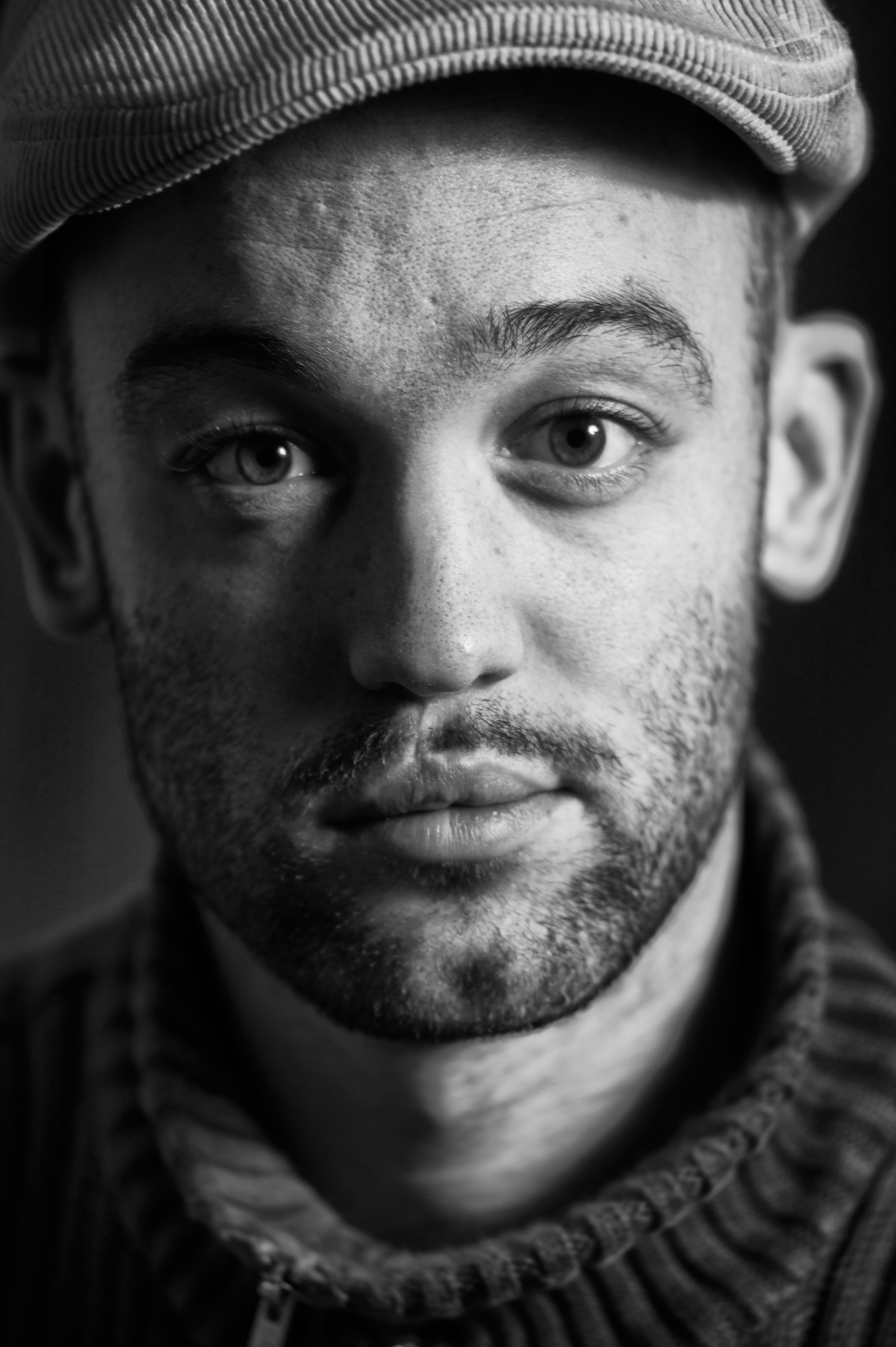
- Born: Christian Alexander Holm-Glad; 24 December 1976 (age 49); Oslo, Norway
- Occupations: Film director, producer
- Years active: 2004–present

Christian Alexander Holm-Glad (born 24 December 1976) is a Norwegian film and theatre director.

Christian Holm-Glad has directed and produced numerous music videos, TV-series and documentaries. He has worked with artists including Kygo, Calvin Harris, Madcon, Kano,Serena Maneesh, Kaada, Number Seven Deli, Cloroform, Thirstin Howl III, Launderettes and more and has had number one hits in the UK and in Norway. He has also directed several TV series for Scandinavian TV in addition to numerous commercials and short films. He has been nominated seven times and has received one Norwegian Emmy Award "Gullruten", and clips from his series have been seen over 30 million times on YouTube. He is a veteran of international film festivals, receiving nominations and awards from festivals across the globe. Christian Holm-Glad is the founder of the Norwegian production company Bulldozer Film and the Norwegian art and science edutainment company Science Addiction. Christian Holm-Glad has been signed as a director at the Scandinavian production company Bacon, the French production company Excuse My French and the American production company REVERIE Content.

== Features, documentaries & TV ==
Series / Film title	Description	
Entangled Animal	We need nature more than nature needs us.	Cannes World Film Festival (winner)
Valhalla	The Viking children Røskva and Tjalfe embark on an adventurous journey from Midgard to Valhalla with the gods Thor and Loki.	Cinemas world wide
Religion of Sports – Follow that Line	Race Across America is an ultra-cycling event that runs the length of the US, clocking in at a little over 3000 miles. Sarah Cooper, a 45-year-old mother of four from Iowa and an ultra-cycling phenomenon, sets out to finish the race in under 10 days.	Netflix/DirectTV
Larger Than Life	A series about life sciences.	NRK
Med livet som innsats (Life on the Line)	Edutainment series where the host puts his life on the line to prove the laws of physics.	NRK
Sushi & Nuclear	Short documentary in Japan with physicist Sunniva Rose.	VGTV
How Do They Do It?	Discovery Channel series (20 episodes).	Discovery Channel
Fylla	Edutainment series about the effects of alcohol.	NRK
I kveld med YLVIS	Late-night talk show with the Ylvis-brothers.	TV Norge
Typisk Deg	Entertainment series about human quirks with Petter Schjerven.	TV Norge
Folkeopplysningen	Popular science series that looks at alternative and faith-based medicine through scientific glasses, with physicist Andreas Wahl.	NRK
Chasing the World's Largest Number	Popular science series on numbers, statistics and mathematics, with Jo Røislien.	VGTV
Norwegian finals of the Eurovision Song Contest	Wrote and directed the opening sequence.	NRK
Siffer	Popular science series on numbers, statistics and mathematics, with Jo Røislien.	NRK
Om alt på 5 minutter	Educational films about everything between heaven and earth, with Petter Schjerven.	NRK
Påpp and Råkk	Drama comedy musical (1 episode).	NRK
Velg 09	Portraits of eight political parties with Petter Schjerven.	NRK
Tingenes Tilstand 2	Entertainment series with Petter Schjerven.	NRK
Tingenes Tilstand	Entertainment series with Petter Schjerven.	NRK

== Short format ==
Film title	Description
Triangle	Three short films from the perspectives of three people on the same evening
Chronic Insomnia	Second part of the Insomnia trilogy
Transient Insomnia	First part of the Insomnia trilogy
Rhapsody (Seven Vibes)	Sort film/commercial for the Stavanger Symphony Orchestra

== Theatre ==
Play	Description
Welhaven	A performance set up at Torshov theatre in Oslo, in collaboration with actor Kåre Conradi.
An Enemy of the People - Istanbul	An Enemy of the People with The Norwegian Ibsen Company in association with Galata Perform.
An Enemy of the People - Los Angeles	An Enemy of the People with The Norwegian Ibsen Company in association with Latino Theater Company.

== Awards and nominations ==
Year	Festival/Award	Work selected/nominated
2025	Odense Film Festival(Selected)	Cake
2025	Cinequest (Selected)	Cake
2025	Independent Days (Selected)	Cake
2024	Filmhaus (Winner)	WWF - We Are Nature
2023	Cine Paris Film festival (Winner)	WWF - We Are Nature
2022	Ramure D´Or Awards (Winner)	Entangled Animal
2022	Texas Arthaus Festival (Winner)	Entangled Animal
2021	Cannes World Film Festival (Winner)	Entangled Animal
2021	New York International Film Awards (Winner)	Entangled Animal
2021	The British Short Film Awards (Nominated Best Director)	Entangled Animal
2021	Los Angeles Film Awards (Winner)	We Have Survived Nature for Ages
2021	Hong Kong International Film Festival (Winner)	Entangled Animal
2021	Latin America Film Awards (Winner Best Director)	Entangled Animal
2020	Toronto Film Festival (Selected)	Kaada – Farewell
2020	New York City Independent Film Festival (Selected)	Kaada – Farewell
2020	Long Story Shorts (Winner)	Kaada – Farewell
2020	International Music video Paris (finalist)	Kaada – Farewell
2020	Los Angeles Lift-Off (Selected)	Kaada – Farewell
2020	Paris Science (Selected)	The Un-Infinite Universe
2020	The European Independent Film Festival (Selected)	Kaada – Farewell
2020	Berlin Music Video Awards (Nominated)	Kaada – Farewell
2020	Hollywood Gold Awards (Winner – Best director)	The Un-Infinite Universe
2020	Hollywood Gold Awards (Winner)	Kaada – Farewell
2020	Portland Film Festival (Selected)	We have survived nature for ages
2020	Aesthetica Film Festival (Selected)	Kaada – Farewell
2020	Aesthetica Film Festival (Selected)	We have survived nature for ages
2019	Cinamafest (Selected)	Kaada – Farewell
2019	Music Video Underground Festival (Semi-finalist)	Kaada – Farewell
2019	Epica Awards (Shortlisted)	Visit Norway
2018	VOTD (Winner)	Kygo – Telia MusicMaker
2018	VOTD (Winner)	Say Hi to Change
2017	Webby Awards	Life on the Line
2017	Paris Short Film Festival (Winner)	The Nordic Sound
2017	BAFTA recognised Aesthetica Short Film Festival	The Nordic Sound
2017	Widescreen Film Festival	Life on the Line
2016	Mediterranean Film Festival Cannes	Life on the Line
2016	Paris Art and Movie Awards	Life on the Line
2016	Hollywood International Independent Documentary Awards	Sushi & Nuclear
2016	Hollywood International Independent Documentary Awards	Chasing the World's Largest Number
2016	Los Angeles Cinefest	Chasing the World's Largest Number
2016	Los Angeles Cinefest	The Nordic Sound
2016	Breaking Waves Music and Arts Festival	The Nordic Sound
2016	Puerto Madero International Film Festival	The Nordic Sound
2016	Gullruten – (Norwegian Emmy)	Med livet som innsats (Life on the Line)
2016	VOTD	The Nordic Sound
2016	Film Shortage	Life on the Line
2016	Tokyo Lift-Off Film Festival	Sushi & Nuclear
2015	Webby Award	Chasing The World's Largest Number
2015	The American Documentary Film Festival	Sushi & Nuclear
2014	Shots Contender	Driving Safely Home for Christmas
2014	Gullruten – (Norwegian Emmy)	Fylla
2014	Hove Festival	Chasing The World's Largest Number
2013	Aesthetica Short Film Festival	Chasing The World's Largest Number
2013	Aesthetica Short Film Festival	Animals
2013	The Visuelt awards	Rhapsody (Seven Vibes)
2013	New York Festivals	Rhapsody (Seven Vibes)
2013	Nordic Docs	Chasing The World's Largest Number
2013	The Norwegian Short Film Festival	Chasing The World's Largest Number
2013	Gullruten – (Norwegian Emmy)	Folkeopplysningen
2013	Gullruten – (Norwegian Emmy)	Typisk Deg
2013	Minimalen Short Film Festival	Chronic Insomnia
2013	Minimalen Short Film Festival	Transient Insomnia
2012	UK Music Video Awards	Rhapsody (Seven Vibes)
2012	The Norwegian Short Film Festival	Transient Insomnia
2012	Gullruten – (Norwegian Emmy) – 2 nominations	Siffer
2010	The Norwegian Short Film Festival	Madcon, Freaky Like Me
2009	The Norwegian Short Film Festival	Calvin Harris, Not Alone
2008	Gullruten – (Norwegian Emmy)	Tingenes Tilstand
2006	The Norwegian Short Film Festival	Serena Maneesh, Drain Cosmetics
2006	The Norwegian Short Film Festival	Number Seven Deli, Blame Me
2005	Alarmprisen	Serena Maneesh, Drain Cosmetics
