= Einar Tørnquist =

Norwegian musician and talk show host

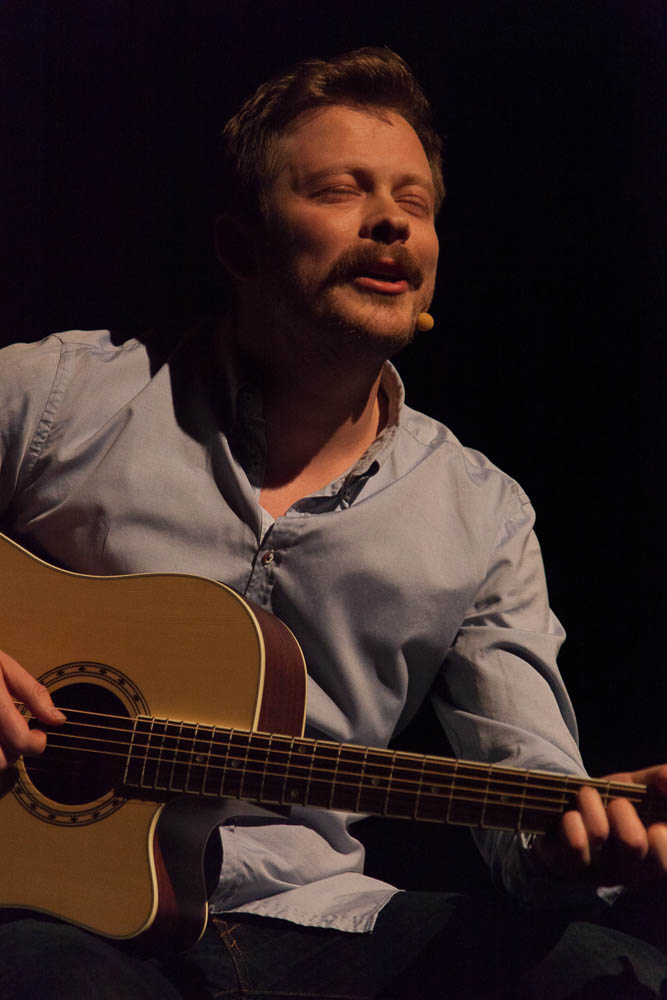
- Born: Einar Tørnquist Johansen; 23 June 1982 (age 43); Tromsø, Norway.

Comedy career
- Medium: Television, web-TV.

Einar Tørnquist Johansen (born 23 June 1982) is a Norwegian drummer and talk-show host. He hosts the eponymous Tørnquist-show which is available from VG's, Norway's largest newspaper, web-TV. He also featured in the comedy late-night talk show Storbynatt, hosted by his friends Bård Tufte Johansen and Harald Eia, as a drummer for the houseband "Svidd gummi". The how aired for one season on NRK1.

Tørnquist hosts two popular podcasts: "Jan Thomas og Einar blir venner", with no:Jan Thomas; and "198 land med Einar Tørnquist", with a different celebrity guest each week.

He was awarded as the best newcomer/breakthrough at the 2013 edition of Komiprisen.

He also appeared in the Norwegian edition of MasterChef, but did not make the final.
