= Magnus Devold =

Norwegian comedian and actor (born 1986)

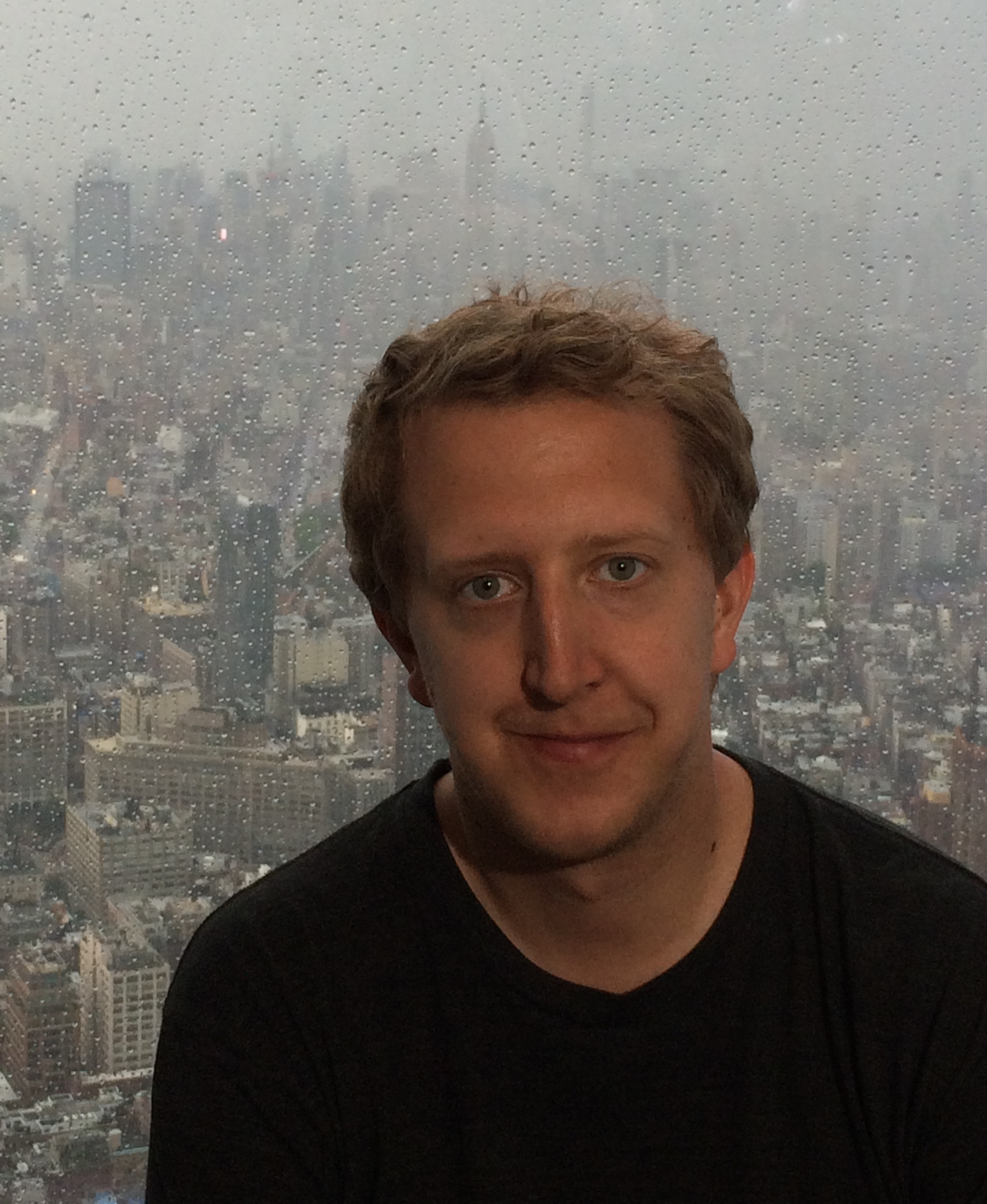
- Born: 13 November 1986 (age 39); Oslo, Norway
- Occupations: Comedian, actor, and stunt reporter

Magnus Trygve Olsen Devold (born November 13, 1986) is a Norwegian comedian, actor and stunt reporter from Oslo.

Devold is known from the TV series Swedes are people, Tonight with Ylvis (I kveld med Ylvis), Get me to the Games, the VGTV series @Home, TV Ekstra, Norway's best party, The World's Best Holiday and in 2015 he got his own show "Kjendiskveld with Magnus Devold". In 2017 he was featured in a TVNorge campaign featuring comedians in roles they do not belong.

Devold was educated at the theater line at Romerike Folkehøgskole and the textwriter line at Westerdals College. He was involved in Oslo-revues as an actor and instructor and won the Revelpris in 2010 as director of the Lambertseterrevy together with Hasse Hope and Christian Valeur. He is also included in the podcast trio Dustene (2015-) with Fanny Vaager and Hasse Hope.

Magnus Devold is the son of Tove Devold (née Olsen). He is a grandson of journalist, author and musician Simon Flem Devold.
