= Ylvis =

Norwegian comedy duo

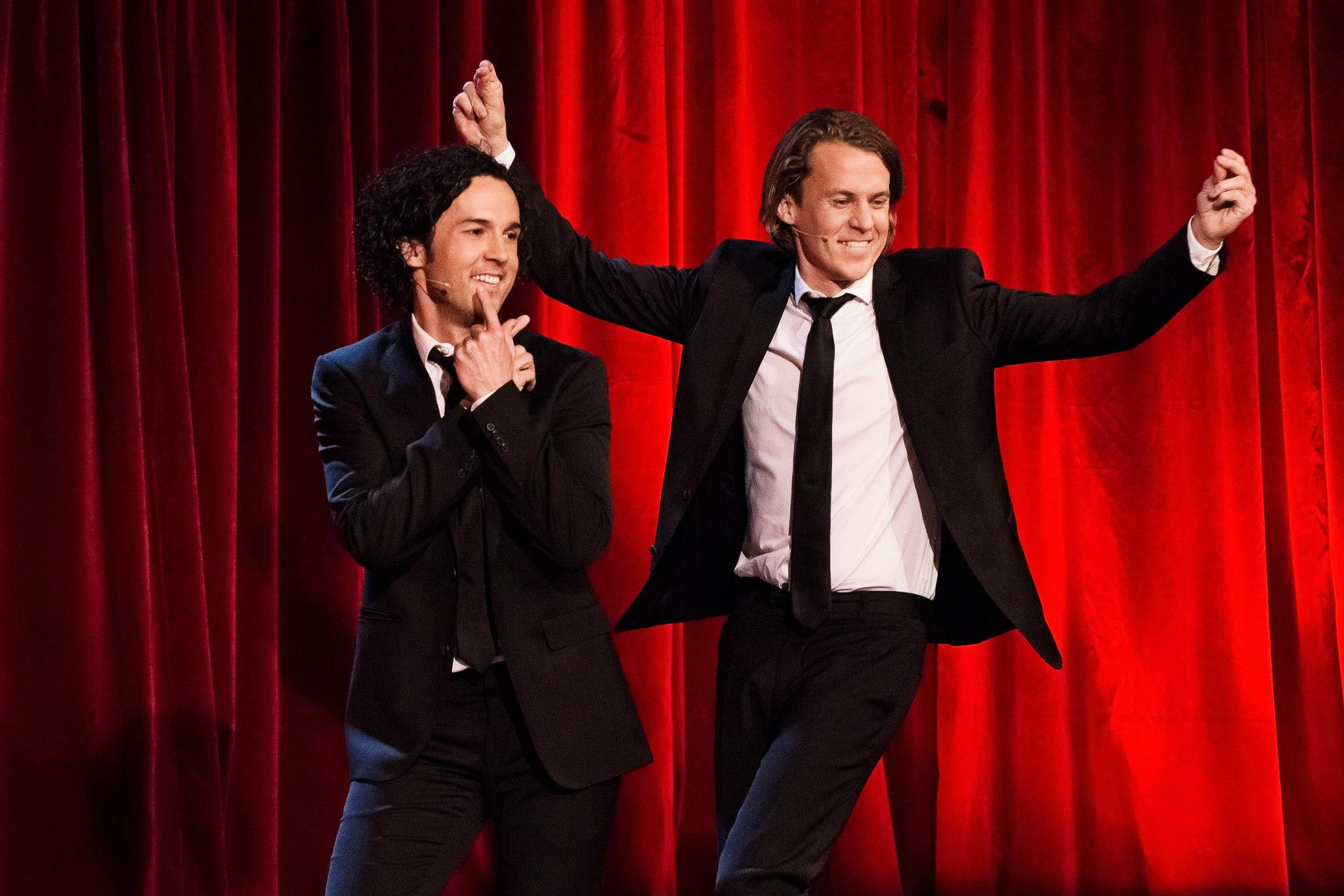
- Vegard (left) and Bård Ylvisåker (right) in 2012
- Notable work: I kveld med Ylvis; "The Fox (What Does the Fox Say?)"

Comedy career
- Years active: 2000–present
- Medium: Variety show; late-night talk show; novelty music
- Genres: Sketch comedy; satire; parody; comedy music
- Members: Vegard Ylvisåker; Bård Ylvisåker
- Website: ylvis.com

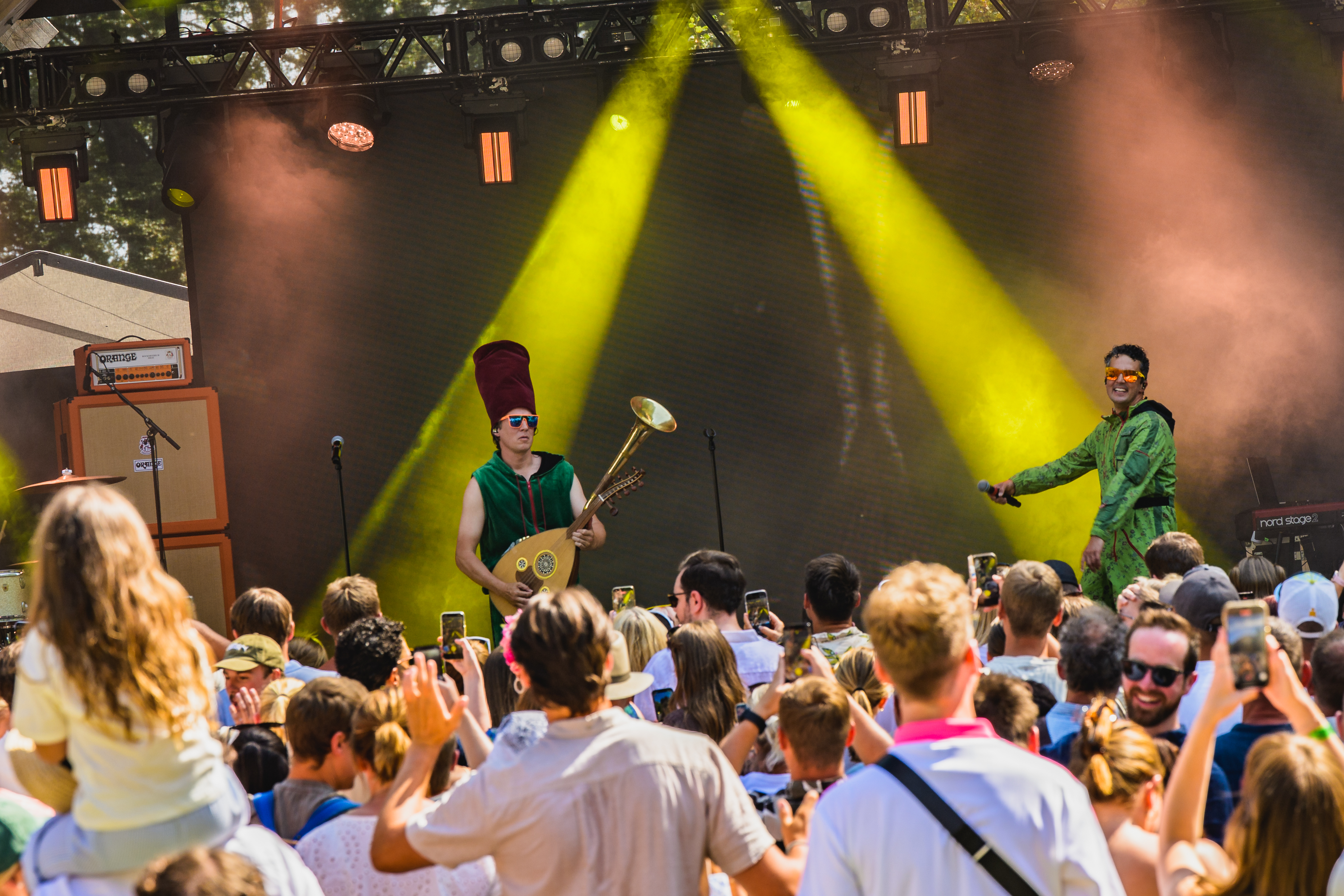
Performing at the Ravnedalen Live open air festival in Kristiansand, Norway, 2026

Ylvis (Norwegian pronunciation: [ˈʏ̀lvɪs]) are a Norwegian comedy duo consisting of brothers Vegard Ylvisåker and Bård Ylvisåker. They debuted as professional variety artists in 2000 and have appeared in several countries in variety shows, comedy concerts, television shows, radio shows and music videos. They hosted the Norwegian talk show I kveld med Ylvis (Tonight with Ylvis) (2011–2016). Their song and music video "The Fox (What Does the Fox Say?)", written and filmed for the talk show, went viral on YouTube in September 2013. The video has over 1.2 billion views as of July 2026. They released an album called Ylvis: Volume I, a compilation of ten older singles. In 2018, the brothers released a series titled Stories from Norway, in which they collected headlining stories from Norway and presented them as short musical documentaries to address satire, fun and comedy.

== History ==
=== Early years and debut ===
Vegard Urheim (born 19 May 1979 in Trondheim) and Bård Urheim Ylvisåker (born 21 March 1982 in Bergen) were born to parents (Hans Terje Ylvisåker and Helga Urheim) from the Sogn district of Western Norway, the older two of three brothers. The youngest brother is Bjarte Urheim. Their early childhood years were spent in Angola and Mozambique, where their father was an engineer during the civil wars there. After a few years in Africa, the family moved back to Bergen, where the brothers received a musical upbringing and were trained in classical instruments. Vegard played the viola and Bård the violin. However, both quit during their youth, Vegard instead focusing on guitar, voice, piano, double bass and comedy, and Bård on guitar, voice, comedy and acrobatics such as aerial silk.

While attending high school at Fana gymnas, they were heavily involved in school and variety shows as well as the school choir. During a performance, they were spotted by impresario Peter Brandt, who orchestrated their debut as professional variety artists at Ole Bull Teater in Bergen in 2000. Their debut show was called "Ylvis en kabaret" ("Ylvis: A Cabaret") and was followed in 2003 by "Ylvis en konsert" ("Ylvis: A Concert").

=== 2006–2009 ===
In 2006, the brothers debuted as hosts on national broadcasting with the radio show O-fag (orienteringsfag, theoretical subject, named after a subject previously taught in Norwegian primary schools, a combination of science and social studies) on NRK Radio.

In January 2007, they appeared onstage at Ole Bull Theater with a new variety show, Ylvis III. They toured with the show for almost three years, the last show being played in Odda in western Norway in December 2009. The show was also recorded and published on DVD. Also in 2007, they debuted as hosts on national television with the show Norges herligste (Norway's Most Wonderful), a version of the Swedish show 100 höjdare (100 Highs). This was released on DVD as well as broadcast on Swedish TV.

In 2008, they released a second series of the radio show O-fag and also a new TV show based on their Ylvis møter veggen stage show on TVNorge, a game show concept inspired by the "Brain Wall", a feature in the Japanese game show Tonneruzu no Minasan no Okage deshita on Fuji TV.

This was followed up by another game show, Hvem kan slå Ylvis (Who can beat Ylvis?) in 2009, based on the German show Schlag den Raab (Beat Raab). Members of the public were invited to try to beat the brothers at various tasks, with a reward of up to one million Norwegian kroner.

=== 2010–present ===
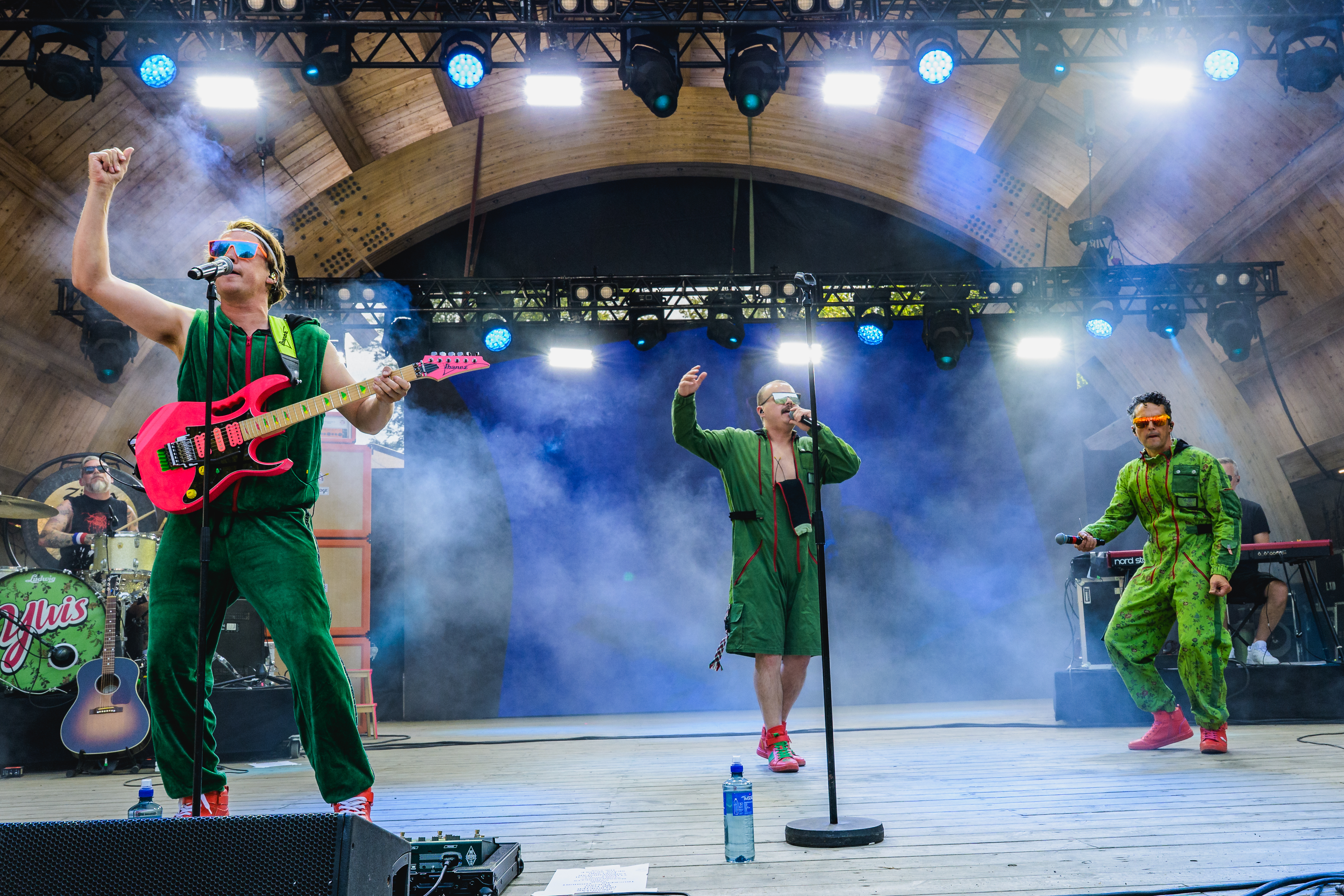
Performing with their younger brother Bjarte (center) at the Ravnedalen Live festival, 2026

In 2010, they hosted Nordens herligste (The Nordic’s Most Wonderful), a pan-Nordic version of the show. In 2011 they reprised their variety stage show with "Ylvis 4", premiering at the Ole Bull Theater with the entire run sold out before opening night. That year, the brothers also launched a comedy talkshow I kveld med Ylvis (Tonight with Ylvis) on TVNorge, with Calle Hellevang-Larsen from comedy trio Raske Menn as a sidekick.

Upon being renewed for a second season, the brothers created a production company, Concorde TV, in order to retain rights and creative control of their work. The second series was broadcast in 2012, with David Batra replacing Hellevang-Larsen in the role of sidekick. In the Fall of 2013, Hellevang-Larsen returned for the third series of I kveld med Ylvis. Despite technical difficulties during the broadcast, the first episode took the top ratings spot.

A number of comedy and parody music videos, either originally featured on I kveld med Ylvis or used to promote the show, have been released onto YouTube and other streaming media. "The Fox" and "Stonehenge" have also been released as singles. "The Fox", produced by StarGate and M4SONIC, which was released on 3 September 2013 to promote the upcoming third series of I kveld med Ylvis, went viral on YouTube and received 31 million views in its first two weeks. It was the most watched video on YouTube worldwide in 2013, and as of July 2026, the video has over 1.2 billion views.

Ylvis received offers for interviews, concerts, and major label record contracts from several countries following the release of "The Fox". Their first performance abroad was on The Ellen DeGeneres Show in the United States, where they appeared on 20 September 2013. They also made an appearance at the iHeartRadio Music Festival in Las Vegas the next day. On 9 October 2013, Jimmy Fallon brought them to his late night show to perform live. On 11 October 2013, they performed on The Today Show outside the studios. On 15 November 2013 they performed on BBC Children in Need where they were joined on stage by Jedward, The Cheeky Girls and Bucks Fizz. On 22 November 2013 Ylvis attended Mnet Asian Music Awards for the first time, and received the International Favorite Artist award.

On 12 December 2013, they appeared on Live! with Kelly and Michael to promote their new children's book titled "What Does the Fox Say?" and later to perform. The book What Does the Fox Say? debuted as no. 1 on The New York Times Best Seller list.

On 15 October 2014, Ylvis released on iTunes a single titled "I Will Never Be A Star", which was recorded by their younger brother, Bjarte Ylvisåker. On 19 November 2015 Ylvis released their first album Ylvis: Volume I on iTunes, which is a collection of some of their popular YouTube hits. On 5 January 2016, Ylvis revealed the music video and song "a capella" on I kveld med YLVIS on TVNorge. "a capella" parodies a cappella groups like Pentatonix.

In 2015, Ylvis received a nomination at the Berlin Music Video Awards for Best Animation with their music video ''Ytterst på tissen” (On the Tip of the Willy)''. The video was made by Julian Nazario Vargas from Animaskin.

On 1 November 2017, it was revealed that the brothers would start a new television show entitled Stories from Norway. The show, which blends the documentary and mockumentary genres with musical numbers, premiered on 19 February 2018 on TVNorge.

In 2019, both brothers appeared on the first season of Kongen Befaler (Norway's version of Taskmaster), and the series overall winner was Vegard.

On 6 October 2022, the brothers announced a new show entitled Ylvis i Sogn. In the ten-episode series, Bård has challenged himself, Vegard, and younger brother Bjarte to write eight songs in two weeks, with the eighth song being a modern remake of Stao no Pao.

== Filmography ==
Television
Year	Title	Role	Notes
2007–08	Norges herligste	Host	14 episodes
2008	Ylvis møter veggen	Host	10 episodes
2009	Hvem kan slå Ylvis	Host	8 episodes
2010	Nordens herligste	Host	9 episodes
2011–2016	I kveld med YLVIS	Host	71 episodes
2018	Stories from Norway	Various	7 episodes
2019	Kongen Befaler	Contestant	10 episodes
2020	Ylvis på Holmen med Calle og Magnus	Host	10 episodes
2022	Ylvis i Sogn	Host	10 episodes
2024	Ylvis mot Ylvis	Contestant	10 episodes
Radio
Year	Title	Role	Notes
2006	O-fag	Host	
2008	O-fag	Host	

== Stage ==
Stage
Year	Title	Role	Notes
2000–01	Ylvis en kabaret	Various	
2001	Ylvis Goes Philharmonic	Various	
2002	Ylvis Goes Philharmonic – episode II	Various	
2003–05	Ylvis en konsert	Various	
2007–09	Ylvis III	Various	Over 200 performances
2011–13	Ylvis 4	Various	
2014–15	The Expensive Jacket Tour	Various	23 concerts in Norway and Sweden
2017	The Expensive Jacket Tour	Various	1 concert in Slovakia (Pohoda festival)

== Discography ==
=== Studio albums ===
Title	Album details	Peak chart positions
Title	Album details	NOR
Ylvis: Volume I	Released: 19 November 2014; Label: Universal; Formats: CD, digital download	24
Stories from Norway: Northug	Released: 13 March 2018; Label: Universal; Formats: Digital download	17

=== Singles ===
Year	Title	Peak chart positions										Album
Year	Title	NOR	AUS	CAN	DEN	FIN	NZ	SWE	SWI	UK	US	Album
2000	"Rumour Says"	—	—	—	—	—	—	—	—	—	—	Non-album singles
2004	"Kjempeform"	—	—	—	—	—	—	—	—	—	—	Non-album singles
2011	"Stonehenge"	—	—	—	—	—	—	—	—	—	—	Non-album singles
2011	"La det på is"	—	—	—	—	—	—	—	—	—	—	Non-album singles
2011	"Sammen finner vi frem"	—	—	—	—	—	—	—	—	—	—	Non-album singles
2011	"Work It"	—	—	—	—	—	—	—	—	—	—	Non-album singles
2012	"Jeg heter Finn"	—	—	—	—	—	—	—	—	—	—	Non-album singles
2012	"Someone Like Me"	—	—	—	—	—	—	—	—	—	—	Non-album singles
2012	"Janym (Жаным)"	—	—	—	—	—	—	—	—	—	—	Non-album singles
2012	"Jan Egeland"	—	—	—	—	—	—	—	—	—	—	Non-album singles
2012	"Pressure"	—	—	—	—	—	—	—	—	—	—	Non-album singles
2012	"Da vet du at det er jul"	—	—	—	—	—	—	—	—	—	—	Volume 1
2013	"The Fox (What Does the Fox Say?)"	1	9	19	9	2	4	3	45	17	6	Non-album single
2013	"The Cabin"	—	—	—	—	—	—	—	—	—	—	Volume 1
2013	"Massachusetts"	—	—	—	—	—	—	—	—	—	—	Volume 1
2014	"Trucker's Hitch"	10	—	—	—	—	—	—	—	—	—	Volume 1
2014	"Mr. Toot"	—	—	—	—	—	—	—	—	—	—	Volume 1
2014	"I Will Never Be a Star"	—	—	—	—	—	—	—	—	—	—	Volume 1
2014	"Yoghurt"	—	—	—	—	—	—	—	—	—	—	Volume 1
2014	"Ytterst på tissen"	—	—	—	—	—	—	—	—	—	—	Volume 1
2014	"Intolerant"	—	—	—	—	—	—	—	—	—	—	Volume 1
2014	"Shabby Chic"	—	—	—	—	—	—	—	—	—	—	Volume 1
2016	"A Capella"	—	—	—	—	—	—	—	—	—	—	Non-album singles
2016	"Old Friends"	—	—	—	—	—	—	—	—	—	—	Non-album singles
2016	"Engine for Gabriel"	—	—	—	—	—	—	—	—	—	—	Non-album singles
2016	"Language of Love" (featuring Esther Roe)	—	—	—	—	—	—	—	—	—	—	Non-album singles
2018	"Nå er det OL"	—	—	—	—	—	—	—	—	—	—	Non-album singles
2022	"Skaol Skadle" (featuring Kjartan Lauritzen)	—	—	—	—	—	—	—	—	—	—	Non-album singles
2022	"Firkantfar"	—	—	—	—	—	—	—	—	—	—	Non-album singles
2022	"Lunken Mat"	—	—	—	—	—	—	—	—	—	—	Non-album singles
2022	"Ferjao"	—	—	—	—	—	—	—	—	—	—	Non-album singles
2022	"Helikopter"	—	—	—	—	—	—	—	—	—	—	Non-album singles
2022	"Old McAdeere"	—	—	—	—	—	—	—	—	—	—	Non-album singles
2022	"Nach"	—	—	—	—	—	—	—	—	—	—	Non-album singles
2022	"Stao No Pao"	—	—	—	—	—	—	—	—	—	—	Non-album singles
2025	"Svenskejævel" (featuring Tix, Staysman, Katastrofe and Alexander Rybak))	4	—	—	—	—	—	—	—	—	—	Non-album singles
"—" denotes single that did not chart or was not released.

== DVD releases ==
- Ylvis III
- Norges herligste
- Nordens herligste

== Awards ==
Year	Award	Category	Project	Recipient	Result
2001	Komiprisen	Best Ensemble		Ylvis	Nominated
2007	Komiprisen	The Year's Funniest (Audience Award)	Ylvis III	Ylvis	Nominated
2008	Gullruten	People's prize		Bård and Vegard Ylvisåker	Nominated
2011	Komiprisen	The Year's Numbers	Ylvis 4	Ylvis	Nominated
2011	Komiprisen	The Year's Funniest (Audience Award)	Ylvis 4	Ylvis	Nominated
2012	Gullruten	TV Name Of The Year		Bård and Vegard Ylvisåker	Nominated
2012	Gullruten	Best Entertainment	I Kveld Med Ylvis	Ylvis	Nominated
2012	Gullruten	Best New Programme	I Kveld Med Ylvis	Ylvis	Nominated
2012	Gullruten	Best Male Presenter		Bård Ylvisåker	Nominated
2012	Komiprisen	Best Performance - TV/Film	I Kveld Med Ylvis	Ylvis	Won
2012	Komiprisen	The Year's Funniest	I Kveld Med Ylvis	Ylvis	Nominated
2013	Komiprisen	Best male artist, TV/Film/Net		Bård Ylvisåker	Nominated
2013	Mnet Asian Music Awards	International Favorite Artist		Ylvis	Won
2014	World Music Awards	World's Best Song	"The Fox (What Does the Fox Say?)"	Ylvis	Nominated
2014	World Music Awards	World's Best Video	"The Fox (What Does the Fox Say?)"	Ylvis	Nominated
2014	World Music Awards	World's Best Group		Ylvis	Nominated
2014	Spellemannprisen	Hit Of The Year	"The Fox (What Does the Fox Say?)"	Ylvis	Won
2014	Gullruten	TV Moment Of The Year	"The Fox (What Does the Fox Say?)"	Ylvis	Won
2014	Gullruten	Best Event	Live: Helkveld Med Ylvis	Ylvis	Nominated
2014	Gullruten	Audience Award		Ylvis	Nominated
2014	Komiprisen	The Year's Male TV Comedian		Bård Ylvisåker	Nominated
2014	Radio Disney Music Awards	Stuck In Our Heads – Catchiest New Song	"The Fox (What Does the Fox Say?)"	Ylvis	Won
2014	MTV Millennial Awards	Viral Video Of The Year	"The Fox (What Does the Fox Say?)"	Ylvis	Won
2015	Berlin Video Music Awards	Best Animation	"Ytterst På Tissen"	Julian Nazario Vargas, Animaskin	Nominated
2015	Gullruten	Best Entertainment Program	I kveld med Ylvis LIVE	Ylvis	Nominated
2015	Gullruten	Best Male TV Host	I kveld med Ylvis LIVE	Bård Ylvisåker	Nominated
2015	Gullruten	Audience Award		Vegard Ylvisåker, Bård Ylvisåker	Nominated
2015	Gullruten	TV Moment Of The Year	Ylvis and Charter-Svein - I kveld med Ylvis Live!	Ylvis and Charter-Svein	Nominated
2015	Nordic Music Video Awards	Post Production	"Ytterst På Tissen"	Ylvis	Nominated
2015	Nordic Music Video Awards	Best Artist Performance	"I Will Never Be A Star"	Bjarte Ylvisåker and Ole Martin Hafsmo	Won
2015	Nordic Music Video Awards	Music Video Of The Year	"Intolerant"	Ylvis	Nominated
2015	Nordic Music Video Awards	GAFFA Audience Award	"Intolerant"	Harald Zwart (director)	Won
2016	Komiprisen	Humor Program Of The Year	I Kveld Med Ylvis LIVE	Ylvis	Won
2016	Komiprisen	Male TV Comedian Of The Year	I Kveld Med Ylvis LIVE	Bård Ylvisåker, Vegard Ylvisåker	Nominated
2016	Komiprisen	Humor Moment Of The Year	I Kveld Med Ylvis LIVE	Ylvis	Nominated
2016	Komiprisen	The Year's Funniest	I Kveld Med Ylvis LIVE	Ylvis	Nominated
2018	Gullruten	Humor Program Of The Year	Stories from Norway	Ylvis	Won
2018	Gullruten	Best Innovation	Stories from Norway	Ylvis	Nominated

Awards
Preceded by Live Nelvik	Se og Hør's TV Personality of the Year; 2013; 2014	Succeeded by Truls Svendsen
