= Radioresepsjonen =

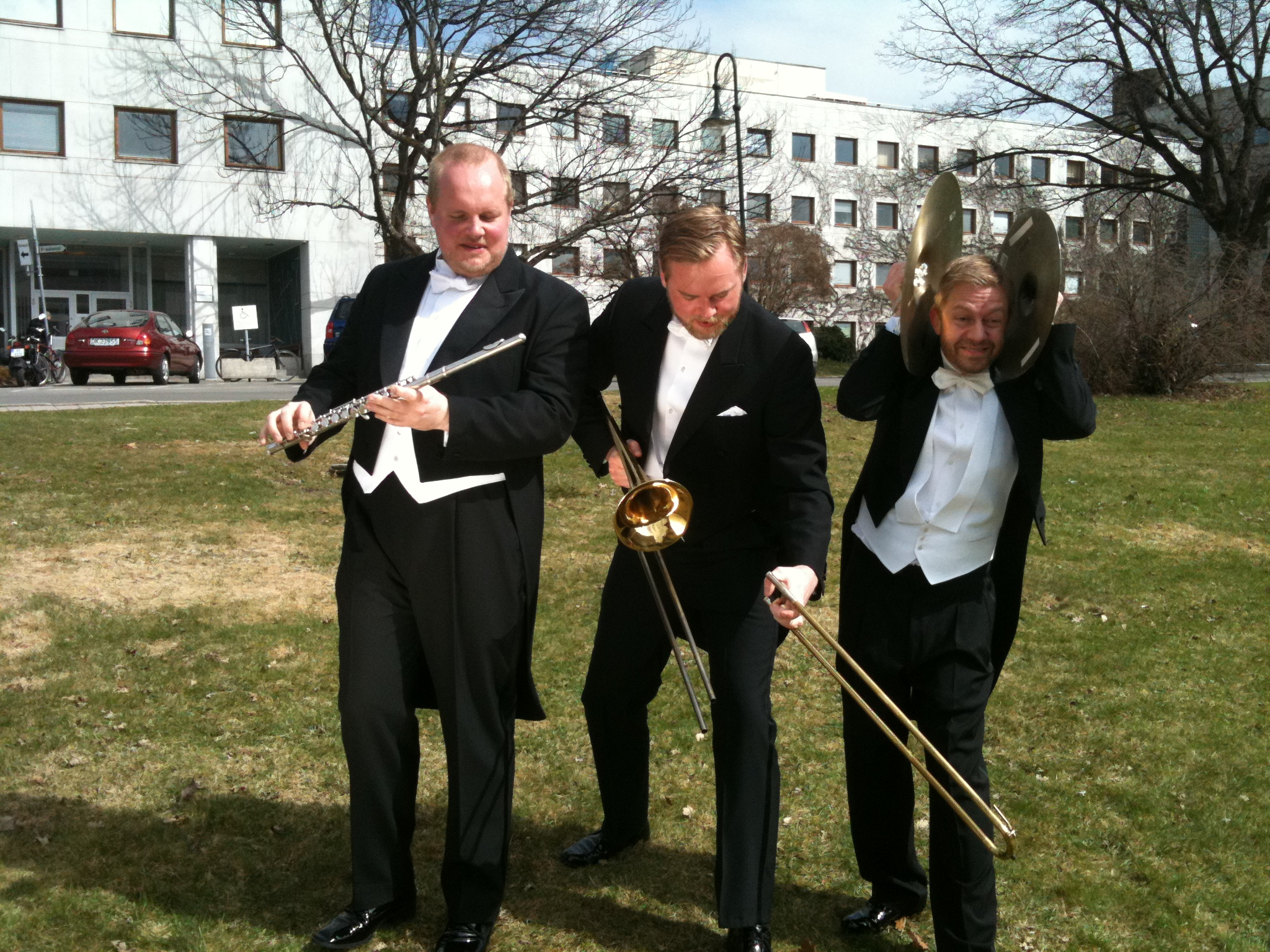
- Radioresepsjonen during a promo shoot for their live "Jingle show".
- Running time: 2 hours.
- Country of origin: Norway
- Language: Norwegian
- Home station: NRK P13
- TV adaptations: Singelklubben; I kveld med Steinar Sagen; Radioresepsjonen på TV; Ukens vinner
- Hosted by: Steinar Sagen
- Starring: Tore Sagen; Bjarte Tjøstheim
- Recording studio: K94, Marienlyst
- Original release: 1 January 2006 – December 17, 2020
- Website: nrk.no/rr
- Podcast: podkast.nrk.no

Radioresepsjonen (Eng. lit. "The radio reception") was a Norwegian radio show. From 2006 to 2013, it was broadcast on NRK P3, a radio station aimed at younger listeners, and was broadcast on NRK P13 from 2014 to 2020. Radioresepsjonen was hosted by brothers Steinar Sagen (host) and Tore Sagen (technician), and Bjarte Tjøstheim (sidekick).

The show was very popular in Norway and has developed cult status amongst a broad audience. It was also the most podcasted radio show in Norway, with over 200.000 downloads each month. In addition to their radio show, the trio has also had success with live shows, TV-shows and other podcasts.

== Biography ==
The idea of the show came to life in 2005. Bjarte Tjøstheim and Steinar Sagen already had long careers in the NRK, while Tore Sagen was only 24. The NRK was originally opposed to the idea of a show where three people would talk and converse on-air at the same time. However, after a pilot was made the show and its format was approved; the show was then launched with the theme "one fat, one tall and one old man make radio".

The namesake of the show is from the actual receptions from the entry of NRK radio building. The show was first given air time in 2006, and was aired from one till three pm, Monday to Friday. The show was then taken off the air due to the trio's new TV project, but they returned in 2007 and was given a permanent air slot after Mina Hadjian was fired from the NRK. The show ceased broadcasting in 2020, when the hosts left the state-owned NRK to create a podcast for Schibsted.

== Controversies ==
The show has received some criticism due to their traditional consumer tests, which has included tests of beer, wine, hard liquor, cigarettes and snus. They were also criticized after making remarks about Mira Craig, which included calling her fat.

In the autumn of 2014, Tjøstheim and the Sagen brothers sparked controversy by talking about the sexualisation of women and related topics in their radio show which was negatively received by some feminist groups who accused them of being "dirty old men". The same year, the trio was accused of mocking mentally disabled people and for the first time publicly apologized for the remarks they had made.

== Discography ==
=== Singles ===
- 2011: "God jul" (Tore as songwriter, guitarist and main vocalist, Steinar and Tjøstheim do background vocals, though there are several versions)
