= NRK P3 Pyro =

Former Norwegian internet radio station

NRK P3 Pyro was a Norwegian internet-based music radio station within the Norwegian Broadcasting Corporation, which profiles itself with the "hardest parts" of rock music, "from The Who to Morbid Angel". The channel had its origin in NRK P3. Leaders of the radio station are Asbjørn Slettemark and Totto Mjelde. It closed in 2015.
