= Fort Massachusetts =

Fort Massachusetts can refer to:

- Fort Massachusetts (Colorado), the first permanent U.S. military post in the State of Colorado
- Fort Massachusetts (Florida)
- Fort Massachusetts (Massachusetts)
- Fort Massachusetts (Mississippi)
- Fort Stevens (Washington, D.C.), was originally called Fort Massachusetts
