= Selda Ekiz =

Norwegian television presenter (born 1984)

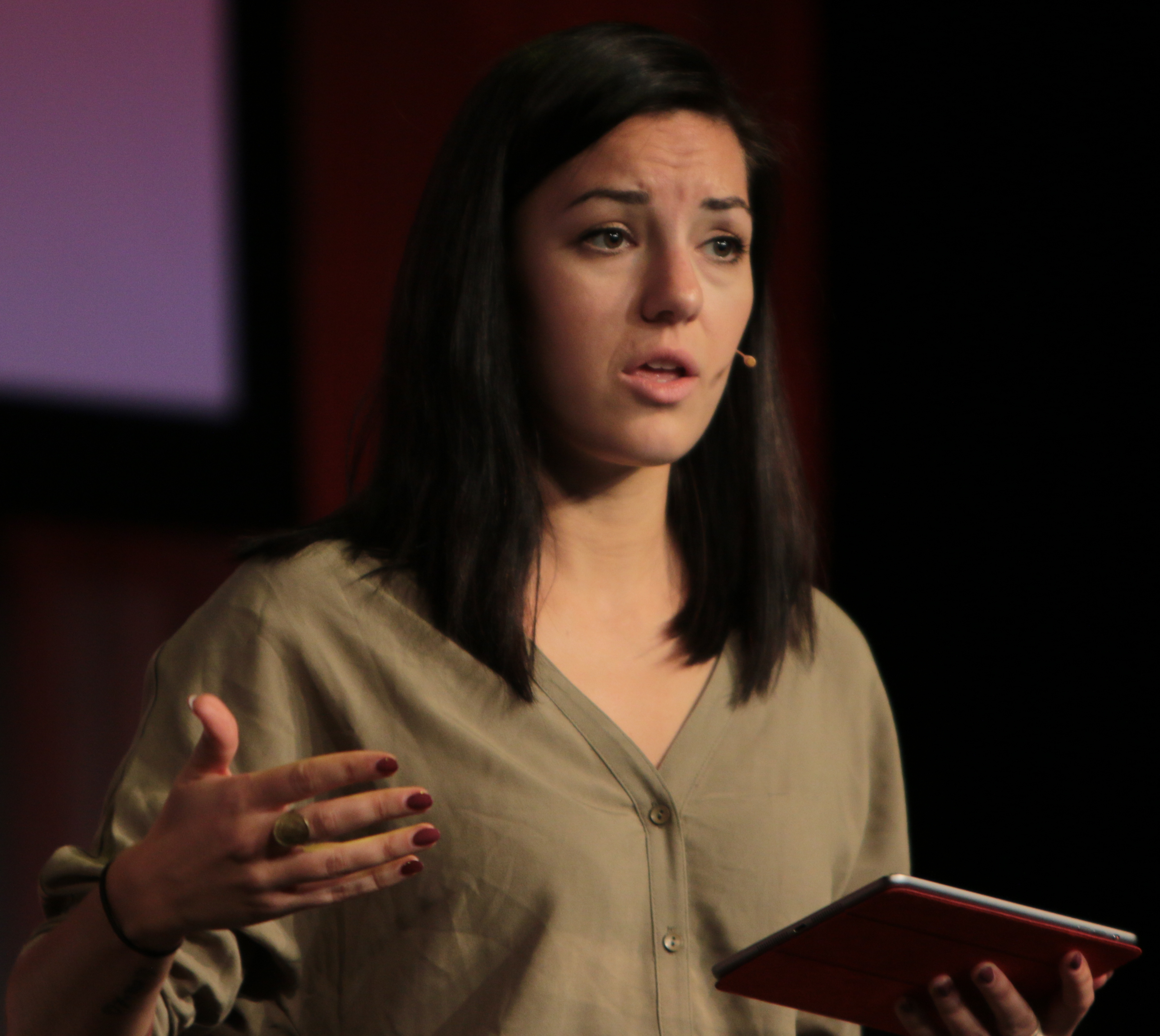
- Born: 28 November 1984 (age 41); Drammen, Norway
- Education: University of Bergen
- Occupations: Physicist; TV presenter
- Partners: Gustav Nilsen (2010-2018); Alf Martin Kollen Evensen (2019–)
- Children: 2

Selda Ekiz (born 28 November 1984 in Drammen) is a Norwegian presenter on NRK and is a trained physicist. She grew up in Sande in Vestfold and her parents immigrated from Turkey in the 1970s.

== Background and career ==
She is named after the Turkish singer Selda Bağcan and moved away from home to attend upper secondary school at Skagerak International School. In 2011, she obtained a master's degree in physics from the University of Bergen, and helped to start up the science communication group "Fysikkshow Bergen" (English: Physics Show Bergen).

She has been associated with NRK Trøndelag. From 2011 to 2013, she was presenter of the popular science youth program Newton. For the programme, she won Gullruten 2013 as best female presenter and was nominated in the same class during Gullruten 2012 as well as the audience award in 2013. Since 2013, she has been presenter of the knowledge competition Klassequizen on NRK TV. From 2015 to 2017, she was presenter of the popular historical reality series Anno, which dramatized daily life 250 years ago, and since 2018, together with Ole Rolfsrud, she has been presenter of the TV competition Alle mot 1. In 2019, she received the Mensa Norges pris (English: Mensa Norway prise) award for her ability to lower the threshold for children's interest in intellectual concepts, and to inspire children to let curiosity, science and research be part of their everyday lives.

In 2020, she debuted as an actress in NRK's drama series Norsk-ish where she played the gynecologist Helin and had a large part of the dialogue in Turkish. For Norsk-ish and Alle mot 1, she was nominated for the audience award during Gullruten 2021.

From 2008, she has also performed as a stand-up comedian and was one of three that won "Unheard and Unheard" during the Great Norwegian Humor Festival in 2008.
