= The Fox (What Does the Fox Say?) =

2013 electronic dance novelty song by Ylvis

Single by Ylvis
- Released: 3 September 2013
- Studio: Roc the Mic (New York City)
- Genre: Comedy; EDM; dubstep; industrial; novelty
- Length: 3:33
- Label: Concorde TV; Parlophone; EMI Norway
- Songwriters: Bård Ylvisåker; Vegard Ylvisåker; Christian Løchstøer; Tor Erik Hermansen; Mikkel S. Eriksen; Nicholas Boundy
- Producers: Stargate; M4SONIC

Ylvis singles chronology
"Janym (Жаным)" (2012)	"The Fox (What Does the Fox Say?)" (2013)	"The Cabin" (2013)

Music video
- "The Fox (What Does the Fox Say?)" on YouTube

"The Fox (What Does the Fox Say?)" is an electronic dance novelty song and viral video by Norwegian comedy duo Ylvis. The top trending video of 2013 on YouTube, "The Fox" was posted on the platform on 3 September 2013, and has received over 1.3 billion views as of July 2026. "The Fox" peaked at the top of the Norwegian Singles Chart and was successful in the United States, where it peaked at number six on the Billboard Hot 100 for three consecutive weeks, and was, before the U.S. release of "Am I Wrong" by Nico & Vinz, the highest-ranked song by a Norwegian artist on the chart since A-ha's number-one song "Take On Me" in 1985.

Originally an "anti-hit" produced to promote the duo's new season of Norwegian television talk show I kveld med YLVIS ('Tonight with Ylvis'), it was uploaded to YouTube as a teaser. Intended, for comedic purposes, to be a "flop", "The Fox" unexpectedly went viral, becoming Ylvis' "breakout" song and drawing international attention to the group. In 2013, Ylvis stated there were no plans to release an album including the song or any sequel to it.

== Production ==
The brothers Vegard and Bård Ylvisåker, members of the Norwegian comedy group Ylvis, produced the song and music video "The Fox" to promote their upcoming third season of I kveld med Ylvis on TVNorge. In an interview with Norwegian newspaper Aftenposten, the brothers stated that the idea of a song about a fox was originally conceived in 2012, but then shelved. Half a year later, in 2013, Bård and lyricist Christian Løchstøer began to play with the idea once again. Vegard was initially skeptical about making a song about a fox, but soon relented. In an interview on the Norwegian-Swedish talk show Skavlan, the brothers mentioned that given the opportunity to collaborate with Stargate, they originally wanted to make a dance song about men who cannot dance or dread dancing and named it "The Dancing Stick", but felt that the idea was "too clever", and that they would appear to be trying to make a hit. The idea was therefore scrapped and "The Fox" got produced instead.

Bård described the writing process for "The Fox" in an interview with Billboard in the United States: "The way we work is we just sit around and talk about things and get ideas and take some notes. I guess we must have been talking about what sound a fox makes. And then we had a chance to work with Stargate, a Norwegian production company based in New York City... We actually did a favor for them and we asked them if they could produce a song for the new season in exchange". Tor Erik Hermansen of Stargate recalled in an interview with Spin that the favor was actually a mockumentary done by the Ylvisåker brothers to celebrate Mikkel Storleer Eriksen's 40th birthday, in which they pretended to be the Stargate duo. Australian producer M4SONIC was also involved in the production.

Bård, being interviewed by Entertainment Weekly, talked about their intention of making "The Fox":

As comedians, it wouldn't be a good thing if we went to pursue a hit in the States because they could potentially make something that became big, so we thought it would be more fun from a comedian perspective to come home to the talk show and say, 'Listen we had the chance, we could've made it big, but the only idea we got for the song was this old idea about what the fox says so we're sorry. We screwed up.' That was the plan... That would've been funny to say on the talk show.

M4SONIC described producing "The Fox":

I was over in the US with a production duo called Stargate working with Sia and Nadia Ali. One of the beats that I made we kinda put to one side as it wasn't really going anywhere. I'd totally forgotten about the track until I stumbled across The Fox video on YouTube. It turned out that Tor and Mikkel (Stargate), who are Norwegian, are friends with Bård and Vegard Ylvisåker (Ylvis). Stargate gave Ylvis a copy of the beat that we made to use for a video they were doing to launch their comedy show in Norway. I think the whole thing kinda 'snowballed' and was an accident on their side as well. No one really thought it would be a top 10 Billboard track!

=== Music video and composition ===
Vegard Ylvisåker (left) in animal costume in the music video

The video was released on 3 September 2013. It is performed in the style of a typical electronic dance pop song, and the lyrics are sung "with deadpan seriousness". The video was originally created to promote the brand-new season of Ylvis' talk show I kveld med Ylvis on TVNorge but after being released on the TVNorge YouTube channel went viral. The video was directed by Ole Martin Hafsmo with cinematography by Magnus Flåto. The choreography was done by Thea Bay. The video is produced by Fredrik Kvåle Dørum and Jørgen Thue (Concorde TV). The forest scenes were filmed in Nittedal municipality, 22 kilometres (14 mi) from Oslo downtown.

The video begins with Bård singing at a costume party where other participants are dressed as different animals, whose appearances follow the progression of the lyrics. He gives a summary of animal sounds ("Dog goes woof/cat goes meow", etc.) that "could have been lifted straight from a preschool primer" and asks "what does the fox say?" The group then transitions into a synchronized dance scene in a forest with Bård in a bear costume and Vegard a squirrel costume (as they failed to find any fox costume in the Norwegian Film Institute the day before filming to make up for their melted spray-painted plastic costumes), complete with face-paint and giant, bushy tails.

During each chorus, the song offers several increasingly absurd possibilities for the fox's sound such as "gering-ding-ding-ding-dingeringeding!" and in the second chorus where Vegard sings "fraka-kaka-kaka-kaka-kow!" Among the dancers, an elderly man (Bernhard Ramstad) is shown reading the lyrics from a book to a boy sitting on his lap. The song then describes the fox and the singer's admiration for it, and asks whether it would communicate with a horse using morse code. In the end, the singers float in the air, continuing to wonder what sound the fox makes, while failing to notice a computer-animated fox behind them, which stands on its hind legs and scat sings (voiced by Vegard), answering their question. Bård finishes the song with a melancholy falsetto and the fox leaves without being seen.

== Reception and responses ==
I think our lives will forever be defined as before and after the song now.

— Bård Ylvisåker, in an interview with the Toronto Sun

In Norway, homeland of Ylvis, "The Fox" became the duo's first entry on the VG-lista and eventually topped the chart for four consecutive weeks from 20 September to 17 October 2013. In the U.S., "The Fox" debuted on 12 September 2013 on the Billboard Hot 100 at number 29, and at number 3 on the Streaming Songs chart. It later reached the top spot on the Streaming Songs chart for the weeks ending 19 October and 2 November. The song in the following week also broke into the Hot Digital Songs top 10 at number 8 with 108,000 downloads during the week and debuted on the On-Demand Songs chart, when it sat in the top 10 of Hot 100 for the third week. The song had sold 1,367,000 copies in the US as of June 2014, and was the best-selling single of the year.

The music video's viral success and catchiness has also drawn comparison to that of PSY's "Gangnam Style". It took only 35 days to hit 100 million views, compared to 51 days by "Gangnam Style" to reach the mark. In the annual year-end lists of "Top 10 Everything" compiled by Time magazine, "The Fox" was ranked number two on the "Top 10 Viral Videos" of 2013 for being "one of the catchiest songs of the year", only after "Gentleman", PSY's follow-up to "Gangnam Style".

Ylvis were surprised by the international success of the song, intending only to target their Norwegian audience. Vegard described the success of the song as "definitely very shocking", while Bård said he was "quite surprised" and that it was "supposed to entertain a few Norwegians for three minutes — and that's all". Three months after the release of "The Fox", he further commented that "[their] lives will forever be defined as before and after the song now". The duo were signed on by Warner Music: Vegard has stated that the "record deal was landed way before 'Fox' — in the spring sometime".

=== Live performances ===
Ylvis' first live performance of "The Fox" in the United States was on 20 September 2013 at the iHeartRadio Music Festival in Las Vegas. They also appeared on The Ellen DeGeneres Show on 20 September, Late Night with Jimmy Fallon on 9 October and The Today Show on 11 October.

After their appearance at the 2013 MTV Europe Music Awards in Amsterdam on 10 November, they gave their first performance in the United Kingdom on the annual fundraising telethon Children in Need on 15 November and later The Paul O'Grady Show on 18 November. On 22 November, joined by K-pop and Western stars including Stevie Wonder, Icona Pop and Paris Hilton, the brothers participated in the biggest music festival in Asia, the Mnet Asian Music Awards ("MAMA") at Hong Kong AsiaWorld-Expo, in which they performed "The Fox", danced in a collaboration with South Korean girl group Crayon Pop to their song "Bar Bar Bar", and accepted the award for "International Favorite Artist".

The duo later returned to North America to perform the viral hit in the season finale of Dancing with the Stars on 26 November, 2013 Much Presents: The Big Jingle organized by MuchMusic on 7 December in Toronto and on Live! with Kelly and Michael on 12 December 2013.

The song was later performed live during concerts given in 2014–2015 in Norway and Sweden as a part of duo's The Expensive Jacket Tour.

Amidst the song's rising popularity in Japan after the Hokkaido Nippon-Ham Fighters used it as a between-innings song, it was announced that a special game would be held on 19 September in 2022, dubbed "Fox Dance Day", against the Chiba Lotte Marines, where the duo would travel to Japan and perform the song before the game live, alongside cheerleading squad Fighters Girl, and mascots Frep the Fox and Polly Polaris.

=== Children's book ===
The brothers signed a deal with Simon & Schuster to publish a children's book illustrated by Svein Nyhus based on the song, which was released on 10 December 2013, called "The Fox". The brothers said that the book is not a spin-off because the idea was conceived before the song had become viral.

The children's book was an instant success, being the bestselling children's picture book for the week ending 29 December 2013 according to The New York Times Book Review, and coming in twenty-third on USA Today's list of best-selling books for the week of 19 December 2013. The book was sold out in a day on Amazon, and broke the record in children's publishing for selling more than 60,000 units in-store within one week, pushing for a sixth reprinting with 300,000 copies in print a week after its initial release.

== Analysis ==
In our show last season, we went to Kyrgyzstan in Central Asia and tried to become pop stars there. The idea was that we'd never become pop stars in the U.S. or England, so we chose another country where it would be easier. We did all kinds of stupid things: performed at weddings. The whole humor is that we didn't succeed and had lots of obstacles. The obstacles generated the comedy. Then suddenly we're on this trip to America, the place people want to go, and there's no obstacles. Every doorway is open... and there's no comedy.

— Vegard Ylvisåker, when asked about the impact of the popular song on I kveld med Ylvis, mentioning their Big in Kirgisistan miniseries

Tris McCall of The Star-Ledger describes "The Fox" as "a parody of the excesses and absurdities of contemporary club music": the brothers "take turns singing preposterous lyrics about animal noises" over "typically vainglorious synthpop", with the proposed fox sounds "mimic[king] the car-alarm synthesizers of contemporary dubstep". He compares it to Ylvis' "Someone Like Me", which mocked the insertion of dubstep breaks into pop songs. Danielle Seamon of The Lantern acknowledges that while some may be "extremely perplexed by the attention stupidity and bizarreness collects in 2013" displayed by the song, it is in fact "meant to be a funny and almost satirical to pop music", and Ylvis has "pushed everybody's buttons by breaking and manipulating every rule of a Top 40 pop song". Evan Sawdey of PopMatters, who names "The Fox" one of the best songs of the year, calls it "a concept that's so stupid it's smart" by bending "the very fabric of pop culture in such a memorable, ridiculous way" with simple lines of "utter comic brilliance".

Caitlin Carter of online music site Music Times echoes the comments above, adding that "The Fox" becoming the first song to get serious recognition "makes [the staff at Music Times] wonder", as the duo's other songs and videos prior to the release of "The Fox" "are just about as random and melodramatic", such as "from contemplating the meaning of Stonehenge" ('Stonehenge'), to scientifically examining the inner-workings of the female reproductive organ ('Work It'), to honoring a United Nations Human Rights hero ('Jan Egeland')." Jonathan Ore of CBC News, although calling "The Fox" a "catchy tune [...] paired with the most absurd lyrics this side of the theme song to DuckTales", also gives the comedy duo credit for "the arguably better" "Stonehenge".

Both brothers have commented on the "absurdity" of "The Fox". Bård called the song "a stupid thing" and that "even though people find it interesting, it's still a stupid fox song, and when people start to get over this, it gets even worse, because it is so stupid". In response to the negative feedback of the song, Vegard has made the following remark:

I read one YouTube comment which said: "What the f*** is this? It gives me no belief whatsoever in humanity and the music business." It's a valid point, but a lot of people don't understand that this is comedy first and music second.

Speaking of the meaning of the song, Vegard characterizes it as coming from "a genuine wonder of what the fox says, because we didn't know". Although interpreted by some commentators as a reference to the furry fandom, the brothers have stated they did not know about its existence when producing "The Fox".

=== Popular culture ===
Like many viral music videos, "The Fox" has become an Internet meme and has been extensively covered and adapted by others, with some of the most prominent being a cover by The Ohio University Marching 110 who had previously covered "Gangnam Style" and LMFAO's "Party Rock Anthem"; a cover by Tay Zonday of "Chocolate Rain" fame; an acoustic guitar cover of the first verse by Tyler Ward; an adaptation based on the popular video game League of Legends entitled "What Does Teemo Say?"; and an adaptation by Annoying Orange entitled "The Sock". The video was also featured twice by the Fine Brothers on their popular series Elders React and Teens React, which show reactions of elderly people and teens to YouTube videos, respectively. A video showing actor Morgan Freeman reading the lyrics of "The Fox" aloud when being interviewed by online TV/movies review site Screen Junkies has also garnered media attention and millions of YouTube views. During an interview with 4Music, in response to the many parodies inspired by their song, the Ylvisåker brothers themselves have reviewed some of the more popular ones. The song was featured substantially in "YouTube Rewind: What Does 2013 Say?", a homage paid by YouTube to the year's top videos.

The song has been featured multiple times on television. It was used in an advertisement for the Fox Network featuring clips of FOX programs and actors singing the song. On 28 October, four contestants on the seventeenth season of Dancing with the Stars performed the song for the "Team Dance" week under the team name "Foxing Awesome", scoring a perfect 30. NBC's Saturday Night Live cast member Jay Pharoah and host Kerry Washington appeared in a parody video of the song titled "My Girl" on 2 November 2013, featuring a boyfriend who got caught by his girlfriend for sexting with other girls. The song has also been performed by the Glee cast in the episode "Puppet Master", aired on Thanksgiving Day (28 November 2013).

Due to the popularity of the song, TMZ reported on 18 October 2013 that two weeks before Halloween, the sales of fox costumes had already risen by almost 40% at one costume outlet from 2012, according to the data from Spirit Halloween, BuyCostumes and Amazon. The song has also been synchronized with a "singing Halloween house" by the neighborhood in Edwards Landing, Leesburg, Virginia, who every Halloween creates an LED light show with a hit song.

The song appears in Just Dance 2015.

The song appears in Disney's 2025 animated film Zootopia 2.

The song was also parodied by 442oons to celebrate Leicester City's title win in a song "What do the Foxes Say?" on YouTube, as well as parodied by Bob Rivers with Twisted Tunes, with lyrics for the Seattle Seahawks.

The song was covered by comedian Brian Posehn with Corey Taylor from Slipknot and Stone Sour, and Michael Starr from Steel Panther on his 2020 album Grandpa Metal.

The song is currently used as a between-innings dance for the Hokkaido Nippon-Ham Fighters Japanese baseball team, which, according to The Japan Times, "has the internet asking again, 'What does the fox say?'" One video on their official YouTube channel featuring mascot Frep the Fox and Fighters infielder Kenshi Sugiya is currently their third-most-viewed video, with over 3.1 million views. It became so popular that it inspired a TikTok trend, and also made NPB streaming service Pacific League TV upload videos of opposing team's players, mascots, and managers dancing along to the song. Hinatazaka46 and the Fighters cheerleaders performed the song for the Kohaku Uta Gassen New Year's Eve concert on 31 December 2022.

== Track listing ==
Digital download
No.	Title	Length
1.	"The Fox (What Does the Fox Say?)"	3:33
2.	"The Fox (What Does the Fox Say?)" (extended mix)	4:37
3.	"The Fox (What Does the Fox Say?)" (instrumental)	4:26
4.	"The Fox (What Does the Fox Say?)" (a cappella)	3:11
Total length:		19:07

CD single
No.	Title	Length
1.	"The Fox (What Does the Fox Say?)"	3:33
2.	"The Fox (What Does the Fox Say?)" (instrumental)	4:25
Total length:		7:58

== Charts and certifications ==
=== Weekly charts ===
Chart (2013–2014)	Peak position
Australia (ARIA)	9
Austria (Ö3 Austria Top 40)	14
Belgium (Ultratop 50 Flanders)	31
Belgium (Ultratip Bubbling Under Wallonia)	6
Canada (Canadian Hot 100)	19
Czech Republic Airplay (ČNS IFPI)	12
Denmark (Tracklisten)	9
Finland (Suomen virallinen lista)	2
France (SNEP)	135
Germany (GfK)	29
Hungary (Single Top 40)	19
Ireland (IRMA)	9
Japan Hot 100 (Billboard)	30
Netherlands (Single Top 100)	58
New Zealand (Recorded Music NZ)	4
Norway (VG-lista)	1
Scottish Singles Sales (Official Charts)	10
South Korea (Gaon Chart)	44
South Korea (Gaon International Chart)	1
Sweden (Sverigetopplistan)	3
Switzerland (Schweizer Hitparade)	45
UK Singles (Official Charts)	17
US Billboard Hot 100	6

=== Year-end charts ===
Chart (2013)	Position
Australia (ARIA)	99
Sweden (Sverigetopplistan)	59
UK Singles (OCC)	129
US Billboard Hot 100	73

=== Certifications ===
Region	Certification	Certified units/sales
Australia (ARIA)	Platinum	70,000^{^}
Canada (Music Canada)	2× Platinum	160,000^{‡}
New Zealand (RMNZ)	Gold	7,500^{*}
Norway (IFPI Norway)	12× Platinum	120,000^{*}
United Kingdom (BPI)	Silver	200,000^{‡}
United States (RIAA)	Gold	1,367,000
Streaming
Denmark (IFPI Danmark)	Gold	900,000^{†}
^{*} Sales figures based on certification alone.^{^} Shipments figures based on certification alone.^{‡} Sales+streaming figures based on certification alone.^{†} Streaming-only figures based on certification alone.

== Release history ==
Country	Date	Format	Label
Norway	2 September 2013	Digital download	Parlophone Music Norway
United States	16 September 2013	Digital download	Parlophone Music Norway
South Korea	10 September 2013	Digital download	Warner Music Korea
Germany	11 October 2013	CD single	Parlophone Label Group
United States	15 October 2013	Mainstream airplay	Warner Bros.

The song was planned to be released on iTunes in the United States on 9 September, but remained unavailable for one week due to allegations of copyright infringement by a third party. It became available on the U.S. iTunes on 16 September.

== See also ==
- Vocalization of the fox
- List of animal sounds
