= NRK P13 =

Norwegian radio station

Coordinates: 59°56′08″N 10°43′08″E

- Nationally available; Norway
- Broadcast area: Norway; Svalbard

Programming
- Language: Norwegian Bokmål
- Format: Rock and Indie music

Ownership
- Owner: NRK

History
- First air date: 28 January 2014; 12 years ago
- Last air date: 1 September 2025; 12 months ago

NRK P13 was a digital radio channel operated by the Norwegian Broadcasting Corporation (NRK). Launched on 28 January 2014, it is a music-based station playing mainly rock and indie music presented in a light-hearted style and aimed chiefly at listeners who consider themselves to be "too old for P3 but also too young for P1".

The channel is broadcast nationwide on DAB radio as well as being available via digital television and on online.
