= Bjarte Tjøstheim =

Norwegian comedian, radio host and actor (born 1967)

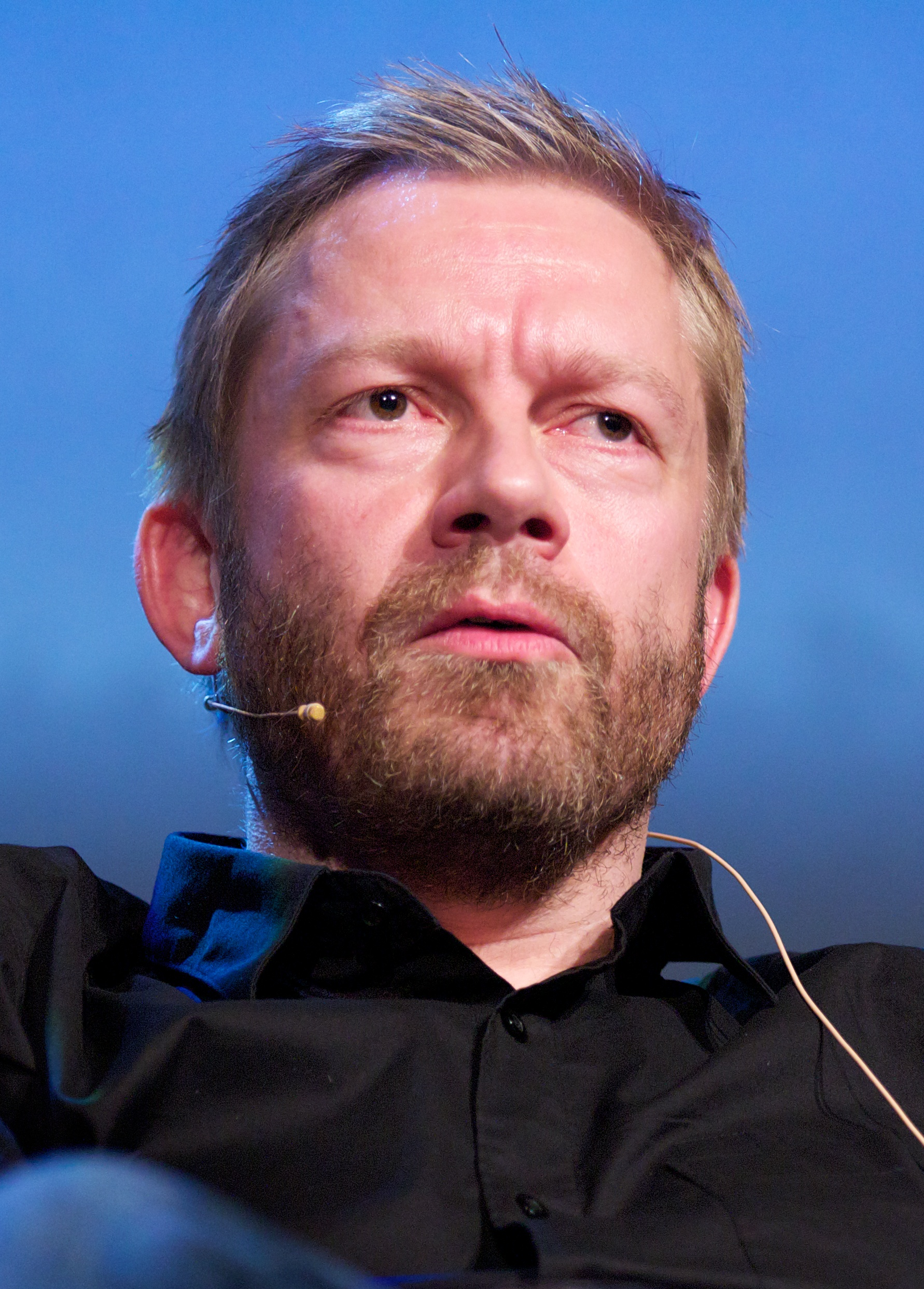
- Born: Bjarte Paul Tjøstheim; 26 July 1967 (age 58); Kristiansand
- Occupation: Actor

Bjarte Tjøstheim (born 26 July 1967) is a Norwegian comedian, radio host and actor. He is best known for his appearance as sidekick in the popular Norwegian radio show Radioresepsjonen, which has been running on NRK since 2006.

In 2014 he was awarded "Norway's funniest man".
