= Tore Sagen =

Norwegian comedian, radio host and actor (born 1980)

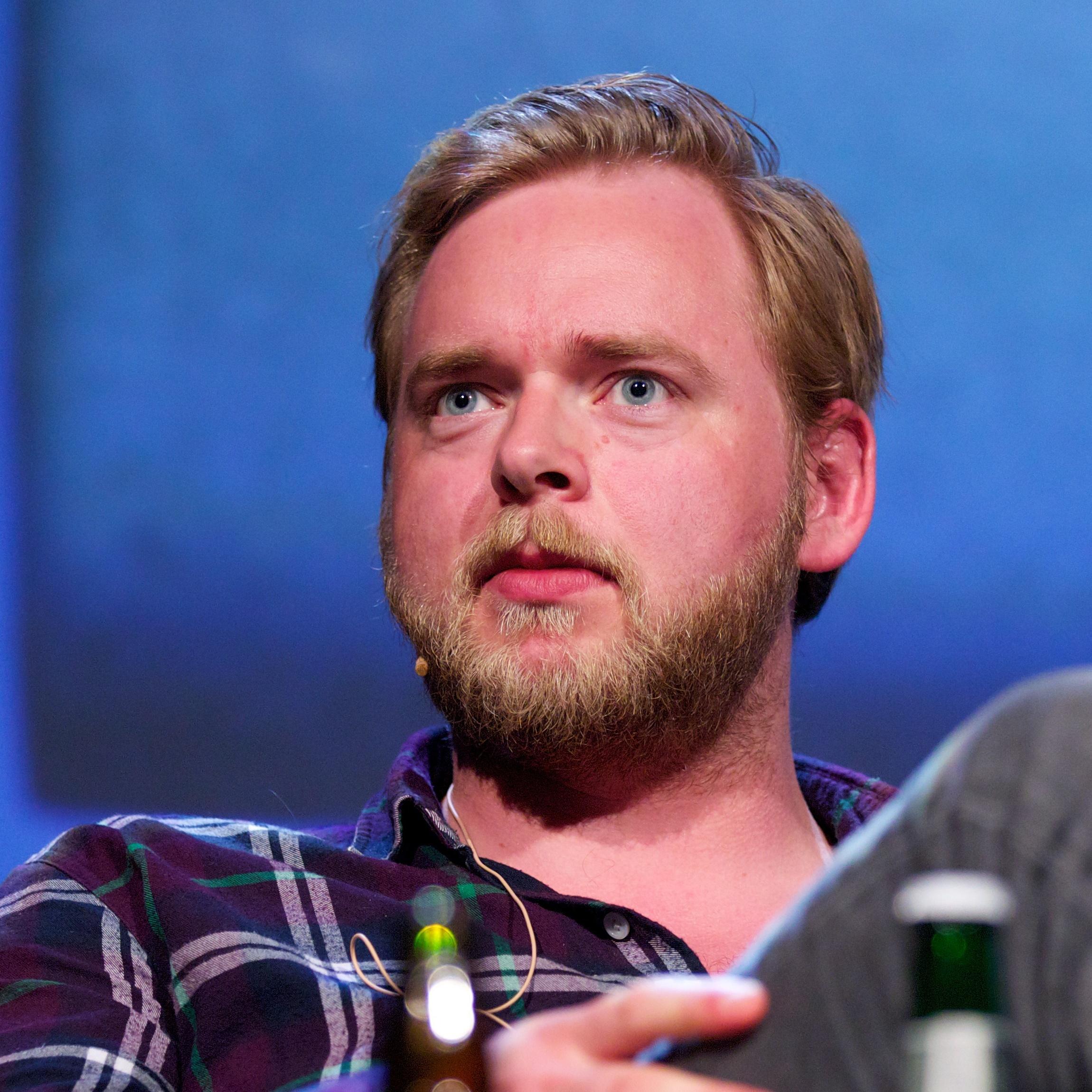
- Sagen in May 2010
- Born: November 7, 1980 (age 44); Oslo, Norway
- Occupation: Actor
- Known for: Radioresepsjonen
- Spouse: Live Nelvik
- Family: Steinar Sagen (brother)

Tore Sagen (born November 7, 1980) is a Norwegian comedian, radio host and actor. He is best known for his role as the co-host and technician of Radioresepsjonen.
