= NRK P3 =

Norwegian digital radio channel

- Oslo; Trondheim; Norway
- Broadcast area: Norway; Svalbard
- Frequencies: NRK DAB+ national multiplex RiksTV: Channel 202; Telenor Norway cable/IPTV: Channel 362; Allente Norway: Channel 192

Programming
- Language: Norwegian Bokmål
- Format: Pop music

Ownership
- Owner: NRK
- Sister stations: mP3, P13, P3 Musikk, P3 Pyro, P3 Urørt, P3X

History
- First air date: 2 October 1993; 32 years ago
- Former names: NRK Petre

Links
- Website: p3.no

NRK P3 is a nationwide digital radio channel operated by the Norwegian Broadcasting Corporation (NRK). It was established as NRK's third radio channel in 1993 and was the result of the NRK radio channel reform initiated in 1992 by radio director Tor Fuglevik.

All NRK's radio stations were gradually digitized during 2017 and transmitted via DAB+ and internet only.

== Programming ==
NRK P3 focuses on youth culture: principally music, together with humour, entertainment, and health education.

Over the years NRK P3 has fostered entertainers including Thomas Numme, Steinar Sagen, Kristopher Schau, Kari Slaatsveen, Jørgen Strickert, Anne Lindmo and Espen Thoresen.

Its notable programs include P3 Sessions that airs own-produced concerts live. Started in 2003, it has an average of 100,000 listeners.

It was the traditional home of Radioresepsjonen until late 2010 (after which a single-season TV version was made for NRK3), and then from 2011 to 2014, after which the show was moved to NRK P13.

== Directors ==
- Rita Westvik (1992–1993)
- Tormod Kjensjord (1993–1997)
- Nils Heldal (1997–2001)
- Marius Lillelien (2001–2009)
- Tone Donald (2009–2016)
- Bjørn Tore Grøtte (acting, 2016–2017)
- Camilla Bjørn (2017–)

== Logos ==
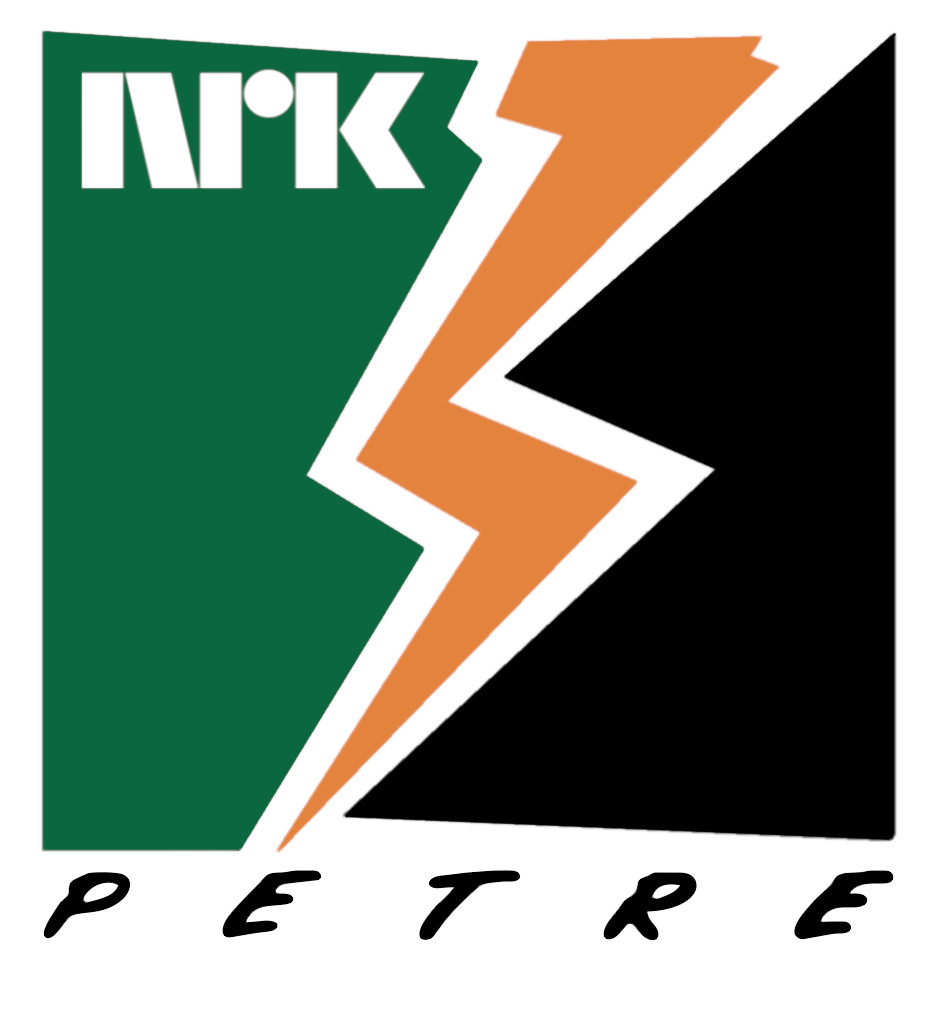
NRK Petre logo from launch in 1993

NRK P3's logo from 2000 to 2007

NRK P3's logo symbol from 2007 to 2017

== NRK mP3 ==
NRK mP3
- Norway
- Broadcast area: Norway; Svalbard
- Frequencies: NRK DAB+ national multiplex RiksTV: Channel 203; Telenor Norway cable/IPTV: Channel 365; Allente Norway: Channel 199

Programming
- Format: Danceclub music
- Network: NRK

Ownership
- Owner: NRK
- Sister stations: NRK P3, NRK P3 Musikk

History
- Founded: 31 July 2000; 26 years ago
- Former names: NRK mPetre
- Former frequencies: 98.0 MHz (Oslo); 95.4 MHz (Bergen); 92.7 MHz (Trondheim); 96.6 MHz (Stavanger); 95.7 MHz (Kristiansand); 97.2 MHz (Bodø); 96.8 MHz (Tromsø); 90.8 MHz (Skien-Porsgrunn); 92.2 MHz (Haugesund, Vadsø); 87.6 MHz (Sarpsborg-Fredrikstad); 93.2 MHz (Gjøvik-Hamar); 96.3 MHz (Alta)

Links
- Webcast: https://radio.nrk.no/direkte/mp3

NRK mP3 is the dance music sister station to P3. It is aimed towards younger listeners, and does not carry any versions of the hourly Dagsnytt NRK short newscasts.

On 29 October 2021, the station teamed up with a number of stations in Europe, such as BBC Radio 1 in the UK and RTÉ 2fm in Ireland, to take part in the radio programme Europe's Biggest Dance Show.

Similarly to NRK Alltid Nyheter, the station was available before 2017 on both FM and DAB+ in various urban areas, while it was only available on DAB+ in rural areas in the same timespan.
