= Anne Lindmo =

Norwegian TV host (born 1970)

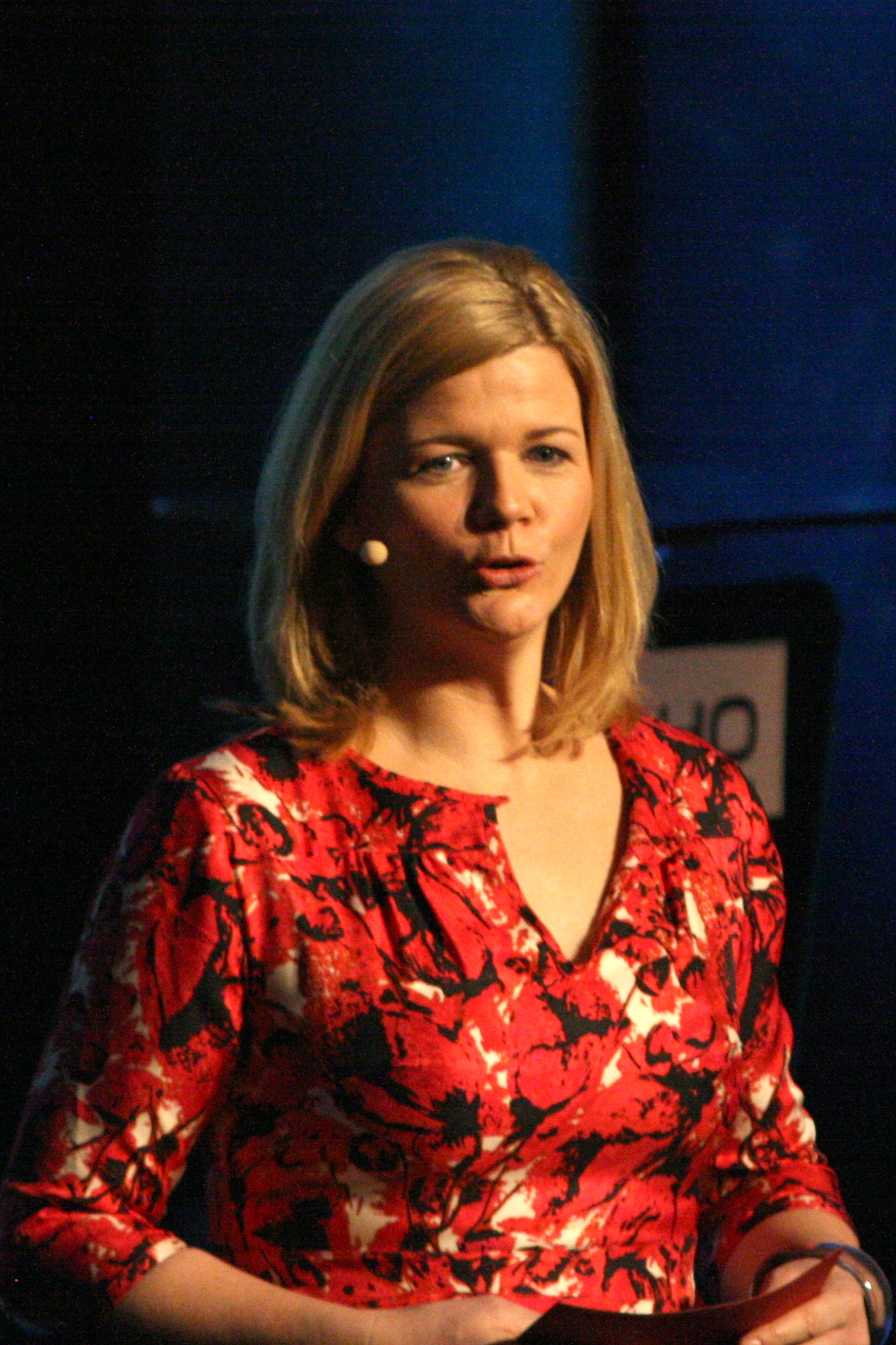
- Anne Lindmo
- Born: Anne Sandvik Lindmo; 3 April 1970 (age 55); Basel, Switzerland
- Occupation: Television host

Anne Sandvik Lindmo (born 3 April 1970 in Basel, Switzerland) is a Norwegian TV host who is most known for her talk show Store studio and Lindmo, aired by the Norwegian Broadcasting Corporation (NRK). Less notable, Lindmo also hosts her own podcast with co-workers Rune Norum and Halvor Haugen.

Lindmo studied at the University of Oslo where she focused on French, sociology and the history of ideas. She earned a master's degree in radio from the University of London.

Lindmo started her career at the Norwegian student-run radio station Radio Nova and has since been in NRK's radio programs Først på, Opptur, XL, Anne Panne, and Mamarazzi. She has worked at NRK since 1994, first in radio, and later on television. Since 2002 she has hosted the TV program Store studio.

She is married to Hasse Lindmo and has two children.

== Awards ==
- Seerprisen (2004)
- Arne Hestenes’ journalist prize (2004)
- Gullruten 2006 in the category of Best Female Host for Store studio
- Gullruten 2008 in the category of Best Female Host for Store studio

Awards
Preceded by Truls Svendsen	Se og Hør's TV Personality of the Year; 2016	Succeeded by Helene Sandvig
