= Steinar Sagen =

Norwegian comedian, radio host and actor (born 1975)

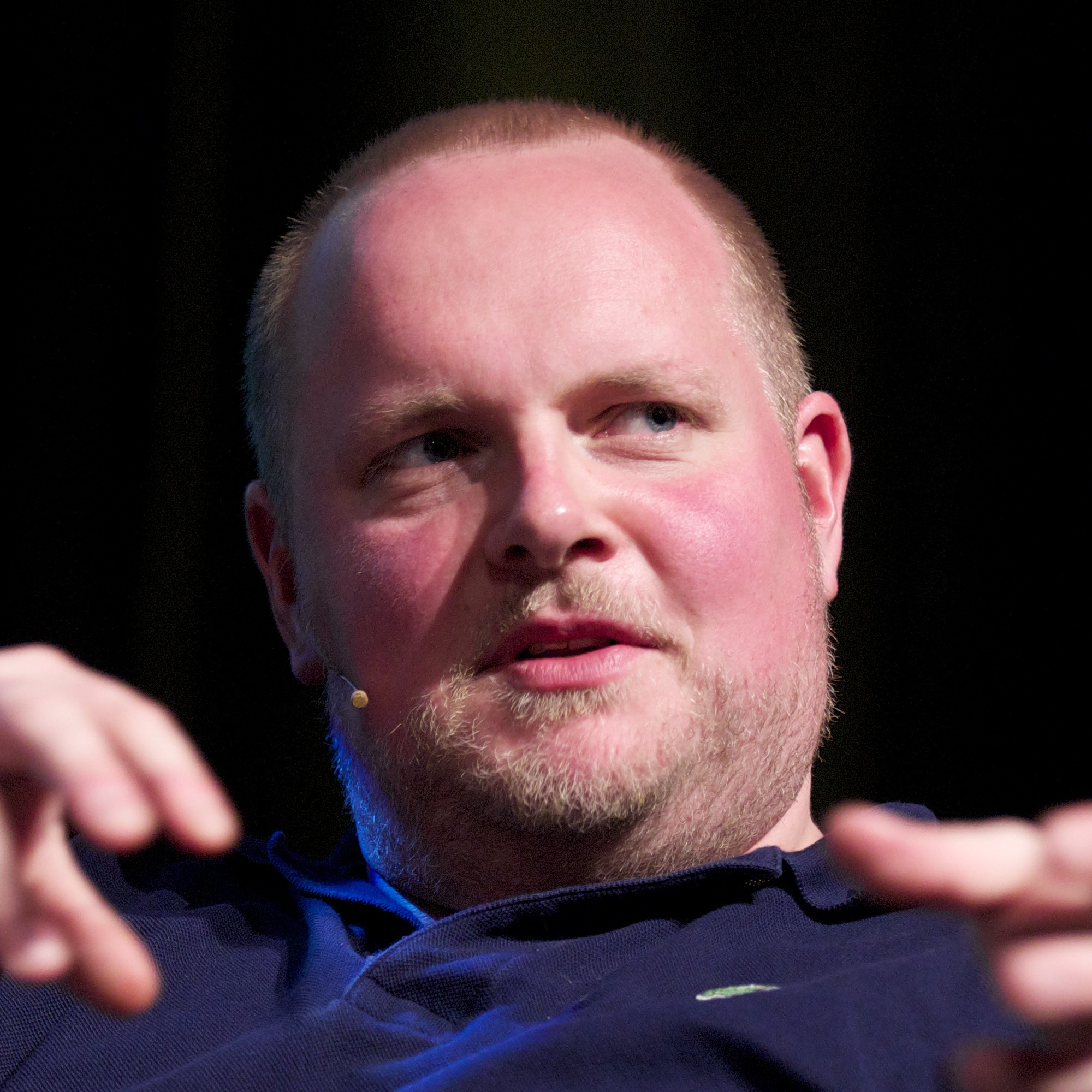
- Sagen in May 2010
- Born: 24 February 1975 (age 50); Oslo, Norway
- Occupation(s): Actor, Radio host
- Family: Tore Sagen (brother)

Steinar Sagen (born 24 February 1975) is a Norwegian comedian, radio host and actor. He is one of the presenters of Radioresepsjonen.
