= Komiprisen =

Annual Norwegian award ceremony

Komiprisen (literally comedy/comic awards) was an annual Norwegian award ceremony with awards in the categories: humour, stand up, revue, and comedy. The award was started to "honour Norway's foremost humorists and is awarded annually to those who have stood out as especially deserving within the comedy-genre. The award is organized and hosted by the national state channel NRK, and was first awarded 2001. The award ceremony is not a strictly traditional ceremony, like the Oscar ceremony, but more riddled with various segments featuring stand-up, comedy, or parodies.

The award has the following categories:

- Best male and best female artist
- Best live show
- Best TV/film show
- Best newcomer
- Best Stand-up
- Best act

and

- Funniest of the year

There is also an honour award, and an award for best craft.

The awards are chosen by a jury, apart from the "Funniest of the year" award which is voted on by the public.

Dagfinn Lyngbø, a stand-up comedian has won the most times; six. The TV-show Nytt på nytt has won five times.
