= Quart Festival =

Former annual music festival in Norway

Coordinates: 58°08′07″N 8°00′14″E

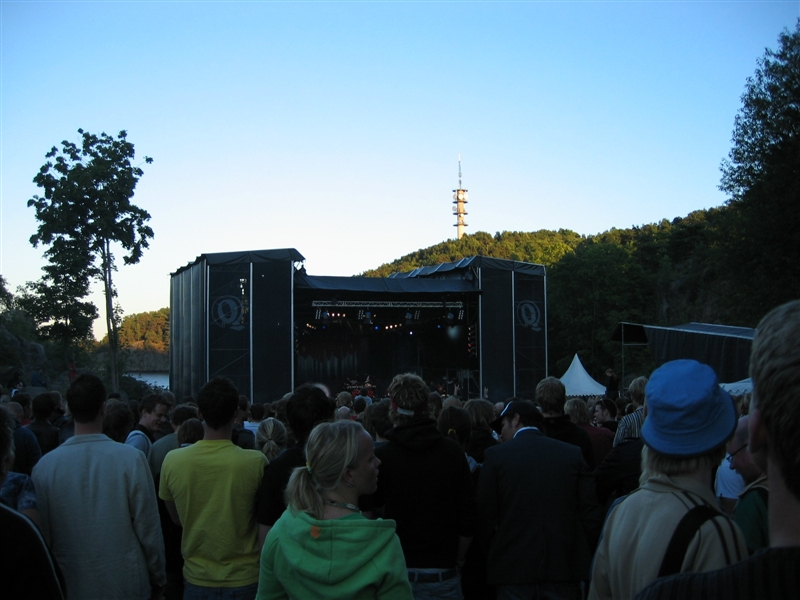
Quart Festival stage at Bendiksbukta, Odderøya

The Quart Festival was an annual popular music festival that took place in Kristiansand, Norway in the beginning of July, from 1991 to 2008. It was the most visited music festival in Norway.

It was first named Qvadradurmusivalen in 1991, but changed into the more ear-catching Quart Festival the following year. For several years, Quart was the largest music festival in Norway, but went bankrupt in 2008 in part due to tough competition from the Hovefestivalen in Arendal and some Oslo-based festivals.

== Scandals ==
There have been some scandals during the years.

- A local band Flying Crap fired a shotgun from the stage in 1995.
- Marilyn Manson ripped a bible on stage in 1999.
- The Kovenant burned a bible on stage in 2000.
- Mayhem threw pigs' heads at the audience in 2001.
- Eight musicians from hiphop group Equicez were arrested for drug offences in 2003.
- Kristopher Schau attached an engine to a dead pig and used it as a boat in 2003.
- Two persons from rainforest charity group Fuck For Forest had live sex on stage during a concert with The Cumshots in 2004.

== 2008 cancelling and bankruptcy ==
On the evening of 6 June, citing low ticket sales (14,000 against a budget of 30,000), the festival management officially decided to cancel the 2008 festival (due to start on 1 July) and as well file the managing company for bankruptcy. Following the 2007 festival, the company had a deficiency of roughly 16 million kroner.

== 2009 – The festival returns ==
The Quart Festival was revived by one of the original organisers and was held on 30 June to 4 July 2009. Slash's performance was backed by Teddy Andreadis, Jason Bonham, Chris Cheney, John 5 and Frankie Perez, and included guest performances from Ozzy Osbourne, Ronnie Wood and Fergie.

The festival was an economic disaster with low attendances and slow revenues. The festival was by mid-September 2009 still not able to pay their employees and is now threatened by bankruptcy.

== Key performers ==
1992: Spiritualized, The Boo Radleys, Tom Russell, Bel Canto, Pogo Pops, Black Press,

1993: Motorpsycho, Seigmen, 808 State

1994: Elvis Costello, The Orb, Blur, Elastica

1995: The Black Crowes, Weezer, Lisa Germano, Morphine

1996: Motorpsycho, Nick Cave and the Bad Seeds, Pulp, Ministry, Orbital, Underworld, Beck, Massive Attack, Black Grape

1997: Rage Against the Machine, Suede, Einstürzende Neubauten, Daft Punk, Aphex Twin, The Charlatans

1998: Beastie Boys, Portishead, Björk, Iggy Pop, Tori Amos, Teenage Fanclub, Wyclef Jean

1999: The Roots, Fatboy Slim, Happy Mondays, Garbage, Marilyn Manson, Blur, Massive Attack, The Cardigans, Skunk Anansie

2000: Sonic Youth, Oasis, Leftfield, Moby, Death in Vegas, Morten Abel, Madrugada, Nine Inch Nails, Counting Crows, Macy Gray

2001: Manic Street Preachers, Deftones, Beck, Alanis Morissette, PJ Harvey, The Dandy Warhols, Motörhead, Coldplay, Wyclef Jean, Mayhem

2002: David Bowie, Travis, Rammstein, No Doubt, Morten Abel, Belle and Sebastian, Turbonegro, Kent, …And You Will Know Us by the Trail of Dead, Jon Spencer Blues Explosion, Kaizers Orchestra, Muse, White Stripes

2003: Massive Attack, Nas, Coldplay, The Flaming Lips, Queens of the Stone Age, Röyksopp, The Cardigans, Immortal, Mew, Tumi And The Volume

2004: Alicia Keys, The Black Eyed Peas, Sean Paul, The Darkness, Morrissey, Pixies, Franz Ferdinand, The Hives, !!!, Phoenix, Pleasure, The Cumshots, Slipknot, N.E.R.D.

2005: Audioslave, Green Day, Foo Fighters, Jimmy Eat World, Snoop Dogg, Thomas Dybdahl, The Game, Porcupine Tree, Stonegard, Fantômas

2006: Depeche Mode, Tool, Kanye West, Muse, Pharrell, Arctic Monkeys, Damian Marley, Devin the Dude, Placebo, Rufus Wainwright, Opeth, The Raconteurs, Wolfmother, Richard Hawley, Gogol Bordello, Flogging Molly, The Cat Empire, Death Cab for Cutie

2007: Turbonegro, The Who, Scissor Sisters, 50 Cent, BigBang, Chris Cornell, Motorpsycho, Black Debbath, The Roots, Mew, Talib Kweli

2009: Marilyn Manson, John 5, Slash, Ozzy Osbourne, Young Jeezy, The Black Eyed Peas, Placebo, Korn, Chris Cornell

== Quart 1996 booking (as seen on official poster) ==
Headliners: Nick Cave and the Bad Seeds, Pulp, Ministry, Massive Attack, Coolio, Orbital, Leftfield, Underworld, Beck, Black Grape

Goldie/Metalheadz, The Presidents of the USA, Foo Fighters, The Amps, The Chemical Brothers, The Roots, Ocean Colour Scene, Fear Factory, Slayer, GZA, The Mike Flowers Pops

Ken Ishii, Nightmares on Wax, BT, Faithless, Lionrock, Moloko, Ash, Nicolette, Spring Heel Jack, Dog Eat Dog, Whipping Boy, Dirty Three, The Brotherhood, Morcheeba, Fun Lovin' Criminals, Hallucinogen, Super Furry Animals, Bis, Motorpsycho, Peltz, The Highrollers, Penthouse Playboys, Palace of Pleasure, Folk & Røvere, Gartnerlosjen, Turbonegro, Subgud, Kåre and the Cavemen, The 3rd and the Mortal, Alania, Tørst, Salida, Gluecifer, Mindstate, Red Cloud, Dryads, Silent, Ad Libitum, Groms, The Weeds, Cirkus Gilmour, Whipped Cream Royale.

== 25th anniversary festival ==
28 and 29 June 2016, the Quart Festival will be revived at Odderøya. The occasion is the 25th anniversary since the first festival. The organisers promise major Norwegian and International names.

== Quart 2000 line-up ==
Tue 4 July	Wed 5 July	Thu 6 July	Fri 7 July	Sat 8 July
Nine Inch Nails	Macy Gray	Oasis	Leftfield	Saint Etienne
Counting Crows	Hil St. Soul	Morten Abel	D'Angelo	Groove Armada
Eels	Blackalicious	Ian Brown	Dead Prez	Calexico
Dipsomaniacs	Oslo Fluid	The Flaming Lips	US HIP HOP feat. 3rd Bass, Missing Link, Mass Influence & Ill Bill	Romanthony
Melt	Rollins Band	Death in Vegas	Soul Kitchen feat. Apollo, Whimsical and Tungtvann	Perculator
Moby	The Facer	Röyksopp	Sonic Youth	Madrugada
Layo & Bushwacka!	The Kovenant	Kid Koala	Elliott Smith	Zeromancer
Atakama	Sona Fariq	Briskeby	Ben Christophers	We
Boy	Black Debbath	Påsan feat. Martine & Mirejam	Monopot	Seven
A Perfect Circle	Beth Orton	Angel Moraes	Ring	Sylvia Wane
Brassy	Sondre	Beatroute	Yo La Tengo	Number Seven Deli
Muse	Nitin Sawhney	Satoshi Tomiie	Mojave 3	Lambchop
Kelis	Aim	Junior Sanchez	Angie Stone	Emmerhoff & The Melancholy Babies
Tungtvann	Little Louie Vega	Animal House	Noora	Rinôçérôse
David Morales		Koot		Xploding Plastix
Roger Sanchez		Cirkus Gilmour		Thee Maddkatt Courtship
				François Kevorkian
				D'Sound

== Quart 2001 line-up ==
Tue 3 July	Wed 4 July	Thu 5 July	Fri 6 July	Sat 7 July
Alanis Morissette	Coldplay	Manic Street Preachers	Beck	Briskeby
Deftones	The Dandy Warhols	PJ Harvey	Bob Hund	Bertine Zetlitz
LOK	Sigur Rós	JJ72	The Strokes	Kinobe
Goldfinger	Ash	Silver	Starsailor	Cosmic Rough Riders
Cadillac	Bad Boys Club	James Band	Common	Brussel
Wyclef Jean	Motörhead	Mayhem	Big Daddy Kane	Euroboys
Stereo MCs	Queens of the Stone Age	In Flames	Lootpack & Peanut Butter Wolf	Bigbang
Klovner i Kamp	Gluecifer	Opeth	KutMasta Kurt	Popium
Salvador	The Hives	Zyklon	Feven, Madcon & Gatas Parlament	The Cumshots
Cradle of Filth (cancelled)	My Vitriol	Einherjer	Grandaddy	Hangface
Ram-Zet	Håkan Hellström	Jim White	The Magnetic Fields	Arab Strap
Zero 7	Peel	Tom McRae	St. Thomas	Anja Garbarek
Sternklang	Goldfrapp	Vidar Vang	Bent	Cloroform
Richard Scanty	Talvin Singh	Wookie	Moon Orchestra	Masta Ace
Dave Clarke	Ai Phoenix	Palace of Pleasure	Tony Touch	Jaga Jazzist
X-Press 2	Stanton Warriors	Jazzy Jeff	Turin Brakes	Moodymann
g-Ha	Richard Scanty	Kings of Convenience	Erick Morillo	Matthias Heilbronn
Pete	Francois K & Eric Kupper	NOR	A Man Called Adam	DJ Phardin
Stephan Grieder	Peer + venner	Little Louie Vega	Stuart Patterson	A Man Called Adam
Jori Hulkkonen	Nathan Haines	Olanskii	Terry Farley	Bjørn Torske
Olle Abstract	g-Ha	Doc L Junior	Olle Abstract	Olle Abstract
KS Choice	Nils Noah	Si Long	Dosertanker	Experimental Pop Band
Buzz Aldrin Band	Håkan Lidbo	Kango	Stardustbreakers	Jigsaw Puzzle
Train	Olle Abstract	Olle Abstract	Stereo 21	NUD
Pagan's Mind	Cadillac	Scariot	Miramis	Grand Lux
	Stonegard	Tonka	Mantra	Bronco Busters
	Tremolo Wankers	Guardians of Time		
	Shitzoo	Bjorvands		
	Java Junkies	The Flush		
	Pornshot			
