= Black Debbath Hyller Kvinnen! =

Studio album by Black Debbath
- Released: 2007
- Recorded: 2007; Caliban Studios, Oslo, Norway
- Length: 46:09
- Label: Duplex Records
- Producer: Ole Petter Andreassen

Black Debbath Hyller Kvinnen! (Black Debbath Praise The Woman) is the fifth album from Norwegian band Black Debbath.

== Track listing ==
No.	Title	Length
1.	"Jag Är Din Pojkvän, Yeah" ("I'm Your Boyfriend, Yeah") (Lars Lønning)	3:54
2.	"Femogtredve Og Heit" ("Thirty-Five And Hot") (Lars Lønning)	4:09
3.	"Pussy In The Bank" (Lars Lønning)	4:15
4.	"Seksualiseringen Av Det Offentlige Rom" ("The Sexualization Of The Public Space") (Egil Hegerberg)	3:20
5.	"Kjøss Meg I Rauma" ("Kiss Me In Rauma") (Lars Lønning)	5:04
6.	"De Enda Nyere Nyfeministene" ("The Even Newer New Feminists") (Aslag Guttormsgaard)	4:02
7.	"Grønn Dame, Rød Klut (Sangen Om Boken Om Damen Anne Enger Lahnstein)" ("Green Woman, Red Rag (The Song About The Book About The Woman Anne Enger Lahnstein") (Lars Lønning)	4:27
8.	"Stakkars Jenter Fra Provinsen" ("Poor Girls From The Country") (Aslag Guttormsgaard)	4:02
9.	"Tung, Riefremkallende Boogie" ("Heavy, Contraction Causing Boogie") (Lars Lønning)	5:26
10.	"Jenter, Søk Dere Til IT-Bransjen" ("Girls, Apply For The IT Industry") (Egil Hegerberg)	3:34
11.	"The Love Song" (Halvdan Sivertsen)	3:56
Total length:		46:09

== Personnel ==
- Lars Lønning – guitar, vocals, theremin
- Ole-Petter Andreassen – drums, percussion, choir
- Aslag Guttormsgaard – guitar, vocals, xylophone, theremin
- Egil Hegerberg – bass, vocals, keyboard
- Tommy Reite – bass on "Jag Är Din Pojkvän, Yeah" and "Pussy In The Bank"
- Christer Knutsen – piano on "Pussy In The Bank"
- Tormod Melaas Holm – saxophone
- Peder Øiseth – trumpet
- Monica Lystad – choir on "Pussy In The Bank"
- Vanja Friksen – choir on "Pussy In The Bank"
- Marianne Pentha – choir on "Pussy In The Bank"
- Hans Josef Groh – cello
- Andre Orvik – violin
- Dorthe Dreier – strings
- Vegard Johnsen – violin
- Øyvind Blomstrøm – organ
- Elisabeth Cederberg – choir on "Femogtredve Og Heit"
- Agnete Kjølsrud – vocals on "Kjøss Meg I Rauma"
- Hedvig and donkey – compliments on "De Enda Nyere Nyfeministene"
- Uffe from Abramis Brama – cowbell
- Roar Nilsen – wind and string arrangements
- LP Lorenz – photography
- Christian Bloom – illustrations and design
