= Ares (musician) =

Norwegian metal musician

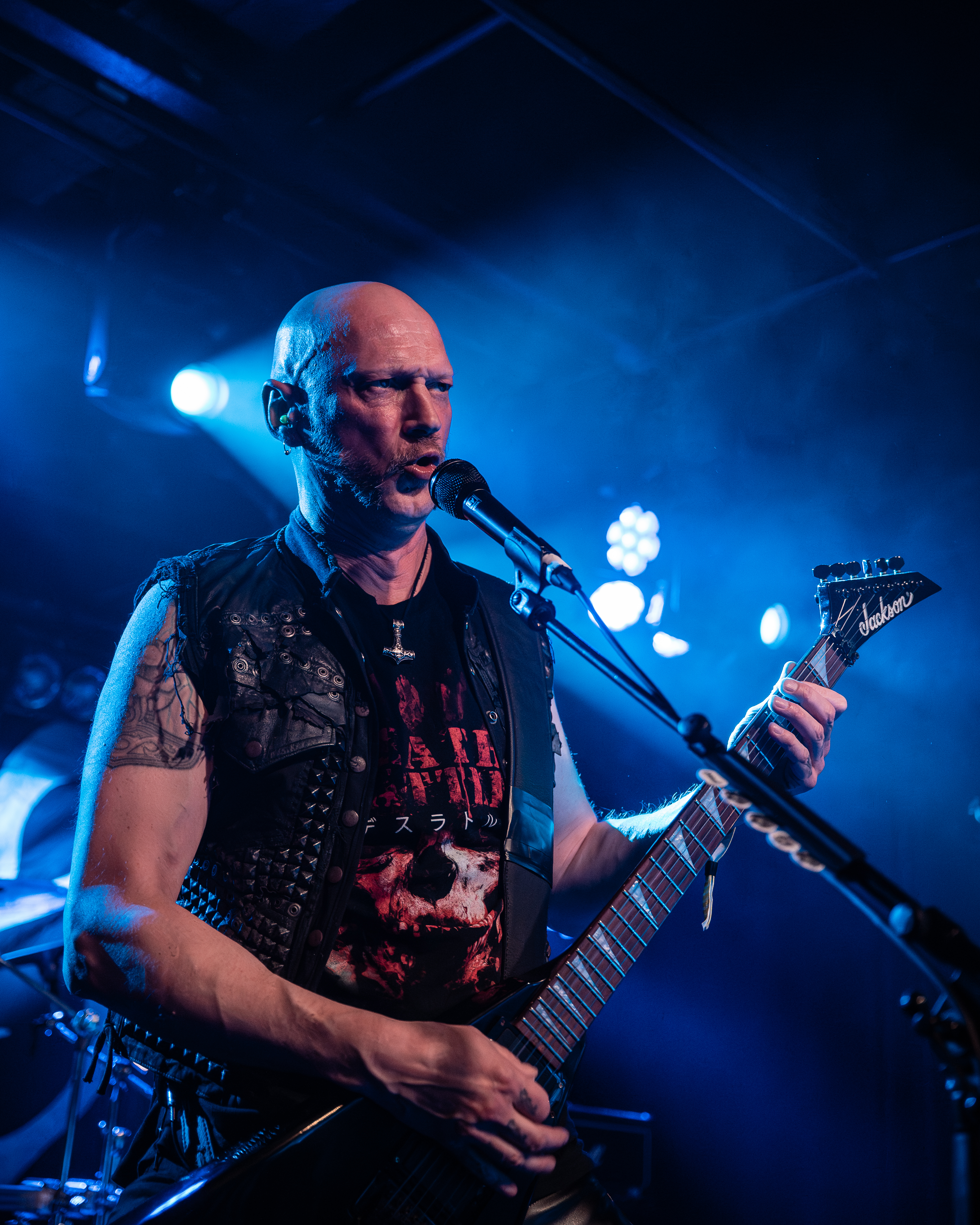
- Ares live with Aeternus in 2025 at Inferno Metal Festival, Norway

Background information
- Born: Ronny Hovland; 3 June 1973 (age 53); Bergen, Norway
- Genres: Death metal, black metal
- Instruments: Vocals, guitar, bass, percussion, Jew's harp
- Years active: Since 1993
- Member of: Aeternus
- Formerly of: Gorgoroth

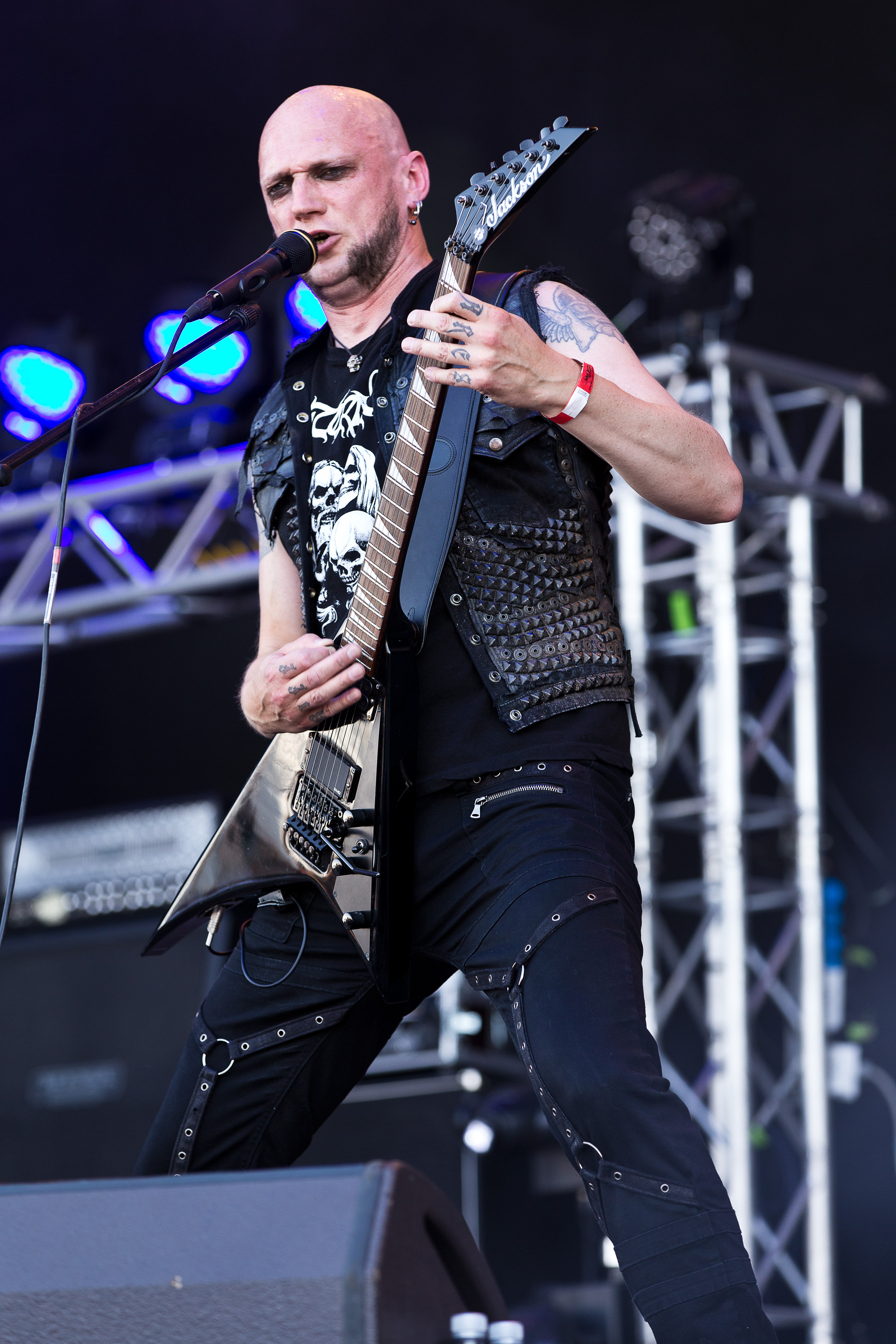
Ares live with Aeternus in 2015 at Party.San Open Air

Ronny Hovland, better known as Ares (born 3 June 1973), is a Norwegian metal vocalist, guitarist and bassist, and the founder of the Norwegian death metal band Aeternus.

== Biography ==
Ares is the founder of the Norwegian dark metal/death metal band Aeternus, in which he plays guitar and does the vocals. The band was formed in 1993 as a trio, composed of Ares, Erik Vrolok, and Morrigan. Ares is now the only remaining original member of Aeternus.

From 1995 to 1997, Ares was the bassist of the black metal band Gorgoroth, before Aeternus' debut album, Beyond the Wandering Moon, was released in 1997 on Hammerheart Records.

Aeternus has since toured with bands such as Emperor and Deicide, and has released an additional five full-length albums.

In addition to Aeternus and Gorgoroth, Ares has played in several other extreme metal bands, and has done live work for bands such as Immortal and Grimfist.

== Associated bands ==
=== Current ===
- Aeternus – since 1993

=== Former ===
- Gorgoroth (1995–1997)
- Corona Borealis
- Black Hole Generator (guest appearance on Black Karma EP + live in 2007)
- Immortal (1998, live)
- Grimfist (live)
- Malignant Eternal (live)
- Chaos Predicted
- Dark Fortress (2003, guest vocalist)
- Orth (1996–1997)
- Gravdal (2010, session live bass)

== Discography ==
=== Aeternus ===
- Walk My Path (demo) (1994)
- Dark Sorcery (EP) (1995)
- Beyond the Wandering Moon (1997)
- ...And So the Night Became (1998)
- Dark Rage (7") (1998)
- Shadows of Old (2000)
- Burning the Shroud (EP) (2001)
- Ascension of Terror (2001)
- A Darker Monument (2003)
- HeXaeon (2006)

=== Gorgoroth ===
- The Last Tormentor (live EP) (1996)
- Under the Sign of Hell (1997)
- Destroyer (1998)
- Bergen 1996 (EP) (2007)

=== Black Hole Generator ===
- Black Karma (EP) (2006)

=== Dark Fortress ===
- Profane Genocidal Creations (2003)

=== Corona Borealis ===
- Cantus Paganus (2000)
