= Guttormsgaard =

Guttormsgaard is a surname. Notable people with the surname include:

- Aslag Guttormsgaard
- Guttorm Guttormsgaard (1938–2019), Norwegian artist
