= Gartnerlosjen =

Norwegian musical group

- Origin: Norway
- Genres: Comedy rock
- Years active: 1987–present
- Members: Kristopher Schau; Egil Hegerberg; Lars Lønning

Gartnerlosjen is a Norwegian rock n' roll band known for their peculiar lyrics. Among the more prominent members of the band are vocalist Kristopher Schau, guitarist and vocalist Lars Lønning, and bassist and vocalist Egil Hegerberg (a.k.a. "Bare Egil", meaning "Only Egil"). The band was formed in Oslo in 1987, and has been mostly inactive since 1996.

Gartnerlosjen has released the albums Krem Fjes ("Cream Faces", 1994) and Due ("Pigeon", 1995), in addition to several EPs and demo tapes. In 2003, they released their first greatest hits album Adjø kreavitet – 30 år med slurv ("Goodbye creativity; 30 years of sloppiness"). The band is signed to Duplex Records, and incorporates many members and music from other bands on the label.

Even though Gartnerlosjen has not released any new material in nearly a decade, they still sporadically hold concerts. The members of the band have later been involved in other bands, like Black Debbath, Bare Egil Band, The Cumshots, Hurra Torpedo and Thulsa Doom.

== Discography ==
Gartnerlosjen's official discographies often contain several fictitious entries. Amongst these are a live album and a third studio album in English. The following releases are confirmed from independent sources.

=== Demos ===
- Gratis Gresse ("Free Graze", 1992)
- Skryte Glatt Patte ("Boast Slick Teat", 1993)

=== Studio albums ===
- Krem Fjes ("Cream Faces", 1994)
- Due ("Pigeon", 1995)

=== Greatest hits albums ===
- Adjø Kreativitet – 30 år med slurv (Goodbye Creativity - 30 years with negligence 2003)
- Overraskelse! (Sannsynligvis to samleplater med Gartnerlosjen) ("Surprise! (Probably two greatest hits albums with Gartnerlosjen)", 2004)

=== EPs and singles ===
- Sjingkpangse (puntum) ("Chingkpangsee (full stopp)", 1994)
- Heldiggrisene ("Lucky pigs", 1995)
- Gartnerlosjens aller beste ("The very best of Gartnerlosjen", 2003)

== Members ==
- Thomas Gavin: drums (1987–1989)
- Terje Jørgensen: bass (1987–1989)
- Hans Jardar Reinmann: accordion, synthesizer (1987–1989)
- Egil Hegerberg: bass, vocals, guitar (1987–)
- Kristopher Schau: vocals (1987–)
- Lars Lønning: guitar, vocals (1988–)
- Sindre Østereng: violin, percussion (1992–1992)
- Harald Egeberg ("The Drummer"): drums (1992–1994)
- Harald Hegerberg: guitar, vocals (1992–)
- Per Aanonsen: drums (1994–)
