= Izhar Elias =

Dutch musician (born 1977)

Izhar Elias (born in Amsterdam, 1977) was the first guitarist to win the Dutch Music Prize. He is specialised in new music for guitar, early and chamber music. By using historical methods and original instruments, Elias has been able to recreate a musical language of the Baroque, Classic and Romantic periods. The Prince Bernard Cultural Foundation made it possible for Izhar to own a 1812 unique Guadagnini guitar. His collaboration with composers, choreographers and film makers has led to over 30 premieres and different multimedia projects.

In 2014 Izhar was the feature of a documentary, where he played a classical piece written by death metal guitarist Florian Magnus Maier.

== Education ==
Izhar has studied early 19th-century performance practice with Carlo Barone and learned the baroque guitar from amongst others Adrián Rodriguez van der Spoel and William Carter. Izhar has studied with Zoran Dukic, Kees Hendrikse, Ton Terra and the Groningen Guitar Duo.

== Career as musician ==
Izhar has given concerts, lectures and masterclasses in Europa, south-east Asia, Australia and Russia. He has been the soloist in concertos with orchestras such as Residentie Orchestra, the Netherlands Chamber Orchestra, the Netherlands Symphony Orchestra, Radio Filharmonisch Orkest and Combattimento Consort.

== Ensemble Cordevento ==
In 2006 Cordevento was founded by Erik Bosgraaf, Alessandro Pianu and Izhar, to revive the virtuoso music of the 17th century —a repertoire often on the border of art and popular music—Cordevento seeks to transcend the literal sense of their musical texts towards the lifeblood and spirit of the music. Cordevento has performed in many of Europe's most prestigious concert halls and early music festivals, such as the Konzerthaus Vienna, Concertgebouw (Amsterdam), Palais des Beaux-Arts (Brussels), Konzerthaus Berlin, Concertgebouw, Bruges, and the Utrecht Early Music Festival.

== Musical awards ==
Besides the Dutch Music Prize, Izhar has won many national and international competitions.

== CD recordings ==
In September 2004 Izhar released his debut album ‘Omaggio a Guadagnini’. In 2007 the CD/DVD 'Big Eye' was released together with Erik Bosgraaf, including contemporary music and experimental films. In June 2009 Izhar released the world premiere recording of themes from Rossini's opera Semiramide, as transcribed by Mauro Giuliani. His album ‘Hommage a Debussy’ was released in November 2011 . In September 2012 Cordevento released their debut album ‘La Monarcha’. In September 2013 his album with early 19th-century transcriptions of works by Beethoven has been released.

== Discography ==
- Adelaide, Beethoven and the guitar (Brilliant Classics, 94631), 2013
- La Monarcha, 17th century music from the Spanish territories, Cordevento (Brilliant Classics, 94252), 2012
- Bassoon Kaleidoscope, with Bram van Sambeek (Brilliant Classics, 9252), 2012
- Hommage à Debussy, Spanish and French guitar music from Paris, Izhar Elias solo (Brilliant Classics, 9246), 2011
- Rossini: Semiramide, opera arrangements for solo guitar by Mauro Giuliani, Izhar Elias solo (2CD, Brilliant Classics, 93902), 2009
- Vivaldi: Recorder Concertos, Cordevento (Brilliant Classics 93804), 2009
- Big Eye, movies & music, Bosgraaf&Elias (CD & DVD, Phenom Records PH0713), 2007
- Omaggio a Guadagnini, classical and romantic guitar music, Izhar Elias solo (Challenge Records, FL72401), 2004
