= ...And Then Take You to a Place Where Jars Are Kept =

Studio album by Thulsa Doom
- Released: 2003
- Recorded: ?
- Genre: Rock
- Length: 51:36
- Labels: Duplex Records (Norway); This Dark Reign (USA)
- Producer: Ole Petter Andreassen

Thulsa Doom chronology
The Seats are Soft But the Helmet Is Way Too Tight (2001)	...And Then Take You to a Place Where Jars Are Kept (2003)	Keyboard, Oh Lord! Why Don't We? (2005)

Professional ratings
Review scores
Source	Rating
Allmusic	4/5 stars

...And Then Take You to a Place Where Jars Are Kept is the second album and the third release by the Norwegian stoner rock band Thulsa Doom, released in early 2003. It was the last with lead singer Papa Doom.

== Track listing ==
No.	Title	Length
1.	"Why Do You Keep On (Watching the Porno) After You Came?"	3:02
2.	"Kick Me"	4:18
3.	"Hold the Parade"	3:04
4.	"Shot by Both Sides"	5:33
5.	"Got to Have Mine"	3:51
6.	"Generation 71"	4:46
7.	"Learn from TV"	5:00
8.	"How Hard Can It Be?"	5:03
9.	"Machine of Oslo"	4:30
10.	"Papa Doom Preach (Where Jars Are Kept)"	9:28
