= Arvas =

Norwegian black metal band

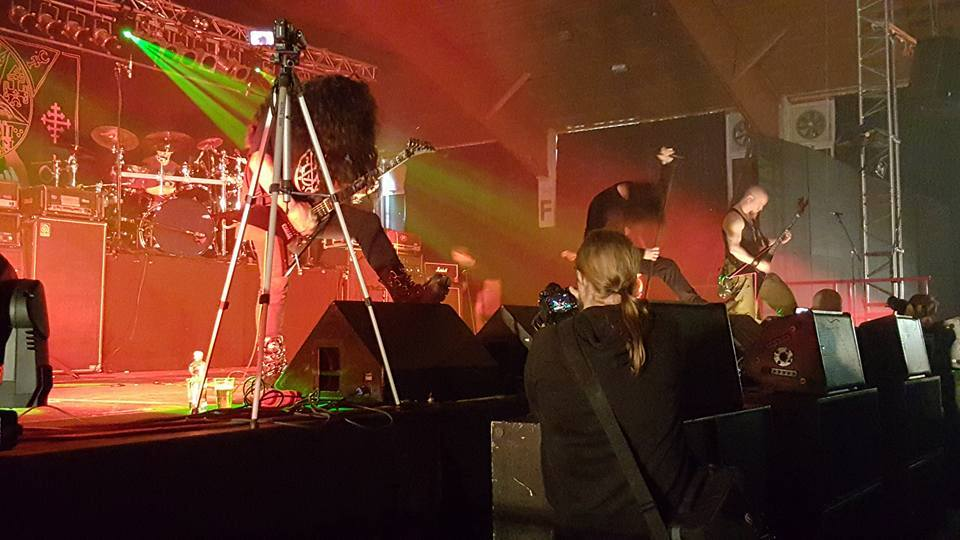

Background information
- Also known as: Örth
- Origin: Bergen, Norway
- Genre: Black metal
- Years active: Since 1993
- Label: Azermedoth (since 1999) ATMF Records (since 2013) Mighty Music Target Music Group (2017,- 2018) Satanic Art Media (2018)
- Members: V-Rex Jarl Ivar Brynhildsvold Kristoffer Lunden Roald Floberg
- Past members: Grim Ares Aindiachaí
- Website: Arvas on Facebook

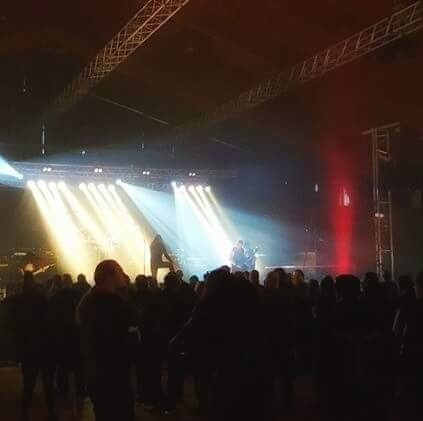
Arvas Live At Kings of Black Metal Festival 2016, Germany.

Arvas, formerly Örth, is a Norwegian black metal band formed in Bergen in 1993 as a one-man project by V-Rex. In Summer 1996, Borknagar drummer Grim and Gorgoroth bassist Ares joined the band. They recorded an album in late 1996, Nocturno Inferno, but it was never released. After Grim committed suicide in 1999, V-Rex kept going as a one-man project, but changed the band's name. He recorded the demos Countless Souls at Dawn and I Am Thy Grief, and a split album with Hordagaard, Dawn of Satan/Uncle Satan, released by Azermedoth Records. The band's first official album, Blessed from Below – Ad Sathanas Noctum, was self-released in 2010. Their second album, Into The Realm Of The Occult, was released in November 2013 by ATMF Records, followed in March 2015 by Black Satanic Mysticism, via Aeternitas Tenebrarum Music Foundation. Arvas has shared stages with Throne of Katarsis, Urgehal, Dauden, 1349, Mongo Ninja, and Nocturnal Breed. In March 2013, Arvas toured east Europe supporting Deicide on their 'End Of The World Tour'. The band's fourth album, Black Path, was released on 24 March 2017 by Mighty Music.

== Members ==
- V-Rex – vocals, Rhythm/lead guitars, programming and synths (since 1993), drums and bass (since 1999)
- Jarl Brynhildsvold - Bass 2018-present
- Kristoffer Lunden - Drums 2018-present
- Roald Floberg - Rhythm Guitar 2019-present

== Past live members ==
- Aindiachai (Taake) - guitar
- Hexzaldre (Lysbryter/Vithr) - bass
- Tivillius - bass
- LB (Vithr/Among Gods) - guitar
- Stürm – guitars
- Bloodlust - guitar
- Vhred Obsternas – bass
- Drakamer - vocals
- Malignant - bass

=== Former members ===
- Grim – drums (1993–1997)
- Ares – bass (1993–1997)
- Fordervelse - drums (2009-2015)
- Coldbound - Vocals (2015-2017)
- Snuff X - Drums (2014-2017)
- Kvalvaag - Bass (2014-2017)
- Stürm - Guitars (2012-2017)
- Hexzaldre - Vocals (2015-?)

== Discography ==
=== Studio albums/promos ===
- Nocturno Inferno (1996, as Örth) [Released on 7 April 2017]
- Promo 09 (2009) [Demo]
- Dawn of Satan/Uncle Satan (split with Hordagaard) (2009)
- Blessed from Below – Ad Sathanas Noctum (2009)
- Into The Realm Of The Occult (2013)
- Black Satanic Mysticism (2015)
- Black Path (2017)
- Equanimity (2019)
- Silent Night (2020) [Single]
- VI (2021)
- Midnight Orchid (2023) [Single]
