= The Seats Are Soft But the Helmet Is Way Too Tight =

The Seats are Soft But the Helmet Is Way Too Tight

Studio album by Thulsa Doom
- Released: 2001
- Genre: Rock
- Length: 40:03
- Label: Duplex Records (Norway); This Dark Reign (USA)
- Producer: Ole Petter Andreassen

Thulsa Doom chronology
She Fucks Me (2000)	The Seats are Soft But the Helmet Is Way Too Tight (2001)	...And Then Take You to a Place Where Jars Are Kept (2003)

Professional ratings
Review scores
Source	Rating
Allmusic	link

The Seats are Soft But the Helmet Is Way Too Tight is the title of Norwegian stoner rockers Thulsa Doom's second release and first full-length album.

The album was released in 2001 and received generally good reviews.

The tracks "Sins of the Next Man" and "Birthday Pony" were also included on the band's debut release, She Fucks Me.

== Track listing ==
1. "Centerfold Blues" – 2:49
2. "You Go First" – 2:37
3. "Clean Your Plate" – 4:06
4. "Ambulance Ride" – 7:23
5. "Sins of the Next Man" – 3:34
6. "Definition of What Made Me" – 2:37
7. "Birthday Pony" – 6:00
8. "21st Century, Where Can I Get a Fuckable Little Grungette?" – 2:38
9. "He's the Head" – 2:52
10. "Way Too Tight" – 5:22
