= Keyboard, Oh Lord! Why Don't We? =

Studio album by Thulsa Doom
- Released: April 2005
- Genre: Rock
- Label: Big Dipper (Norway); This Dark Reign (USA)
- Producer: Ole Petter Andreassen

Thulsa Doom chronology
...And Then Take You to a Place Where Jars are Kept (2003)	Keyboard, Oh Lord! Why Don't We? (2005)

Keyboard, Oh Lord! Why Don't We? is the third album by Norwegian stoner rock band Thulsa Doom. The title is a quote from the Paul McCartney and Stevie Wonder hit single "Ebony and Ivory". Since the last album, lead singer Papa Doom had left the band, and guitarist Doom Perignon became the lead singer.

The album has received good reviews in the Norwegian press.

== Track listing ==
1. "Papa Was"
2. "Need the Air"
3. "Stay OK"
4. "Raisins and Grapes"
5. "Tears in the Morning"
6. "The Deep of the City"
7. "Be Forewarned"
8. "The Ballad of Me and Fast Winston Doom"
9. "Mr. Slow"
10. "Keyboard, Oh Lord! Why Don't We?"
