= Thulsa Doom (disambiguation) =

Thulsa Doom may refer to:

- Thulsa Doom, a character created by Robert E. Howard, and since used in items based on his Conan and Kull stories
- Thulsa Doom (band), a Norwegian stoner rock band
- Thulsa Doom (album), an album by Reverend Bizarre
