= Ebony and Ivory =

1982 single by Paul McCartney featuring Stevie Wonder

Single by Paul McCartney featuring Stevie Wonder

from the album Tug of War
- B-side: "Rainclouds"
- Released: 29 March 1982
- Recorded: 28 February 1981
- Studio: AIR (Salem, Montserrat)
- Genre: Pop rock; soft rock
- Length: 3:42
- Label: Parlophone/EMI (UK); Columbia (US)
- Songwriter: Paul McCartney
- Producer: George Martin

Paul McCartney singles chronology
"Temporary Secretary" (1980)	"Ebony and Ivory" (1982)	"Take It Away" (1982)

Stevie Wonder singles chronology
"Do I Do" (1982)	"Ebony and Ivory" (1982)	"Ribbon in the Sky" (1982)

Official video
- "Ebony and Ivory" on YouTube

"Ebony and Ivory" is a song that was released in 1982 as a single by Paul McCartney featuring Stevie Wonder. It was issued on 29 March that year as the lead single from McCartney's third solo album, Tug of War (1982). Written by McCartney, the song aligns the black and white keys of a piano keyboard with the theme of racial harmony. The single reached number one on both the UK and the US charts and was among the top-selling singles of 1982 in the US. During the apartheid era, the South African Broadcasting Corporation banned the song after Wonder dedicated his 1984 Academy Award for Best Original Song (for "I Just Called to Say I Love You") to Nelson Mandela.

McCartney and Wonder began recording "Ebony and Ivory" in Montserrat in early 1981. The single marked the first time that McCartney had released a duet with another major artist and anticipated his 1980s collaborations with Michael Jackson. The track also appears on McCartney compilations All the Best! (1987) and Pure McCartney (2016), and on the two-disc version of Wonder's The Definitive Collection (2002). In 2013, Billboard ranked it as the 69th-biggest hit of all-time on the Billboard Hot 100 charts.

== Background ==
McCartney wrote "Ebony and Ivory" at his farm in Scotland in 1978. He first rehearsed the song with Wings in 1979. The song uses the ebony (black) and ivory (white) keys on a piano as a metaphor for integration and racial harmony. The title was inspired by McCartney hearing Spike Milligan say, "Black notes, white notes, and you need to play the two to make harmony, folks!" The figure of speech is much older. It was popularised by James Aggrey in the 1920s, inspiring the title of the pan-African journal The Keys, but was in use from at least the 1840s.

While writing the song, McCartney envisaged singing it with a black male singer. He and Wonder recorded it together at George Martin's AIR Studios in Montserrat during sessions lasting from 27 February to 2 March 1981. McCartney then carried out overdubs on the track at AIR in London. Due to conflicting work schedules, McCartney and Wonder filmed their parts for the song's music video separately (as explained by McCartney in his commentary for The McCartney Years 3-DVD boxed set).

A video for the solo version was also made, which showed McCartney playing piano with a bright spotlight, and black men in prison, including one of them being uplifted by the song, dancing and listening to it in prison as well as in the studio. This version was directed by Barry Myers on 11 February 1982. That same day, McCartney filmed a promotional interview for the Tug of War album.

The B-side of the single, "Rainclouds", was written by McCartney and Denny Laine, though on early pressings of the single the song was credited only to McCartney. According to authors Chip Madinger and Mark Easter, "Rainclouds" is "perhaps most notorious" as the track that McCartney worked on during 9 December 1980, straight after hearing that John Lennon had been fatally shot in New York. When leaving AIR Studios in central London that evening, he said in response to a TV reporter's question about the murder: "drag, isn't it?" The footage was included in news broadcasts around the world and McCartney's apparent casualness, though masking his profound shock, earned condemnation from the press.

== Release and chart performance ==
The "Ebony and Ivory" single was released on 29 March 1982 in both the UK and the United States. It marked the first time in McCartney's solo career that he had sung a duet with another major star. In this, McCartney and Wonder fitted a trend as duetting artists became commonplace throughout the 1980s, particularly in mainstream British pop.

The single spent seven weeks at number one on the Billboard Hot 100 in the US and it was the fourth-biggest hit there of 1982. Its commercial success was aided by the music video, with MTV having been launched the year before. The song was also number one in the UK and spent three weeks atop the Irish Singles Chart.

In the US, the single's run atop the chart was the longest of any of McCartney's post-Beatles works, and the second longest career-wise (behind the Beatles' "Hey Jude"). For Wonder, it was his longest-running chart-topper and made him the first solo artist to achieve a number-one single in the US over three consecutive decades. It marked the first time that any single released by any member of the Beatles placed on the Billboard R&B chart. It was McCartney's record 28th song to hit number one on the Billboard Hot 100.

In 2008, "Ebony and Ivory" was ranked at number 59 on Billboard's Hot 100 songs of all-time. It was ranked 69th on a similar list published by the magazine in 2013.

== Critical reception and legacy ==
Record World said it has "a pretty pop melody and sing-along chorus hook."

Some critics have derided the song as "saccharine". According to Madinger and Easter, the most common reaction 20 years later was that it marked "the beginning of the end of [McCartney's] artistic credibility". They add that while the song appealed to listeners who would never usually have bought a McCartney record, it "wore out its welcome quickly" and came to be seen as him attempting to stay musically relevant in middle age, particularly as he soon went on to record duets with Michael Jackson.

In 2007, BBC 6 Music listeners voted "Ebony and Ivory" the worst duet in history. Two years later, Blender magazine named it as the tenth-worst song of all time. Writing in 2010, biographer Howard Sounes said that while many people consider the song to be "annoyingly simplistic", it contains "the ineluctable power of McCartney's best tunes" and was a "massive hit".

"Ebony and Ivory" was banned in South Africa by the South African Broadcasting Corporation during the apartheid era, making it the only song McCartney released in his solo career to receive such a ban. The official reason for the ban was because Wonder accepted his 1984 Academy Award for Best Original Song "in the name of Nelson Mandela".

Part of a phrase from the song's lyrics provided the title for Keyboard, Oh Lord! Why Don't We?, a 2005 album by the Norwegian stoner rock band Thulsa Doom.

=== Screen depictions ===
The song and video were spoofed in a 1982 Saturday Night Live sketch, with Eddie Murphy portraying Wonder and Joe Piscopo, as Frank Sinatra, assuming McCartney's role. In the sketch, Sinatra criticises the "ebony and ivory" metaphor for racial equality (which was deemed by many critics to be overly simplistic, to the point of being insulting) as being "too artsy for the public – capisce?" After a brief exchange, the duo perform the song with more direct, and offensive, lyrics ("You are black, and I am white / Life's an Eskimo Pie, let's take a bite!").

The song and video were parodied in a commercial for the 2008 season of the USA Network show Psych. The South Park season 25 episode "The Big Fix" (2022) features a parody of the song called "Black Puppy, White Puppy". Dan Caffrey of The A.V. Club suggests that McCartney may have denied a request from producers Trey Parker and Matt Stone for the song's inclusion in the episode, thus necessitating the parody.

== Track listings ==
- 7" single (R 6054)
1. "Ebony and Ivory" – 3:41
2. "Rainclouds" – 3:47
- 12" single (12R 6054)
1. "Ebony and Ivory" – 3:41
2. "Rainclouds" – 3:47
3. "Ebony and Ivory" (Solo Version) – 3:41

== Personnel ==
"Ebony and Ivory"

- Paul McCartney – vocals, bass guitar, acoustic guitar, piano, synthesizers, vocoder, percussion, backing vocal
- Stevie Wonder – vocals, electric piano, synthesizers, drums, Linn LM-1, percussion, backing vocal

"Rainclouds"

- Paul McCartney – vocals, Spanish guitar, bass drum
- Linda McCartney, Denny Laine, Eric Stewart – backing vocals
- Paddy Moloney – Uilleann pipes

== Charts ==
=== Weekly charts ===
Chart (1982)	Peak position
Australia (Kent Music Report)	2
Austria (Ö3 Austria Top 40)	3
Belgium (Ultratop 50 Flanders)	2
Canada Top Singles (CBC)	1
Canada Top Singles (RPM)	1
Canada Adult Contemporary (RPM)	2
Denmark (Hitlisten)	5
Europe (Europarade Top 30)	1
Finland (Suomen virallinen lista)	1
France (IFOP)	5
Iceland (RÚV)	1
Ireland (IRMA)	1
Israel (IBA)	1
Japan Singles (Oricon)	26
Japan International (Oricon)	1
Netherlands (Dutch Top 40)	3
Netherlands (Single Top 100)	3
New Zealand (Recorded Music NZ)	2
Norway (VG-lista)	1
South Africa (Springbok)	3
Spain (AFYVE)	1
Sweden (Sverigetopplistan)	2
Switzerland (Schweizer Hitparade)	2
UK Singles (Official Charts)	1
US Billboard Hot 100	1
US Mainstream Rock Airplay (Billboard)	34
US Adult Contemporary (Billboard)	1
US Cash Box Top 100	1
West Germany (GfK)	1
Zimbabwe (ZIMA)	1

=== Year-end charts ===
Chart (1982)	Position
Australia (Kent Music Report)	20
Austria (Ö3 Austria Top 40)	10
Belgium (Ultratop Flanders)	23
Canada Singles (RPM)	3
Netherlands (Dutch Top 40)	22
Netherlands (Single Top 100)	37
New Zealand (Recorded Music NZ)	17
Switzerland (Schweizer Hitparade)	10
UK Singles (OCC)	9
US Billboard Hot 100	4
US Cash Box Top 100	4
West Germany (Official German Charts)	14

=== All-time charts ===
Chart	Position
US Billboard Hot 100	76

== Certifications ==
Region	Certification	Certified units/sales
New Zealand (RMNZ)	Gold	10,000^{*}
United Kingdom (BPI)	Gold	500,000^{^}
United States (RIAA)	Gold	1,000,000^{^}
^{*} Sales figures based on certification alone.^{^} Shipments figures based on certification alone.

== See also ==
- List of RPM number-one singles of 1982
- List of European number-one hits of 1982
- List of number-one hits of 1982 (Germany)
- List of number-one hits in Norway
- List of number-one singles from the 1980s (UK)
- List of Hot 100 number-one singles of 1982 (U.S.)
- List of number-one adult contemporary singles of 1982 (U.S.)
