= Hegerberg =

Hegerberg is a surname. Notable people with the surname include:

- Ada Hegerberg (born 1995), Norwegian women's footballer
- Andrine Hegerberg (born 1993), Norwegian women's footballer
- Egil Hegerberg (born 1970), Norwegian comedian and musician
