= Aeternus =

Norwegian blackened death metal band

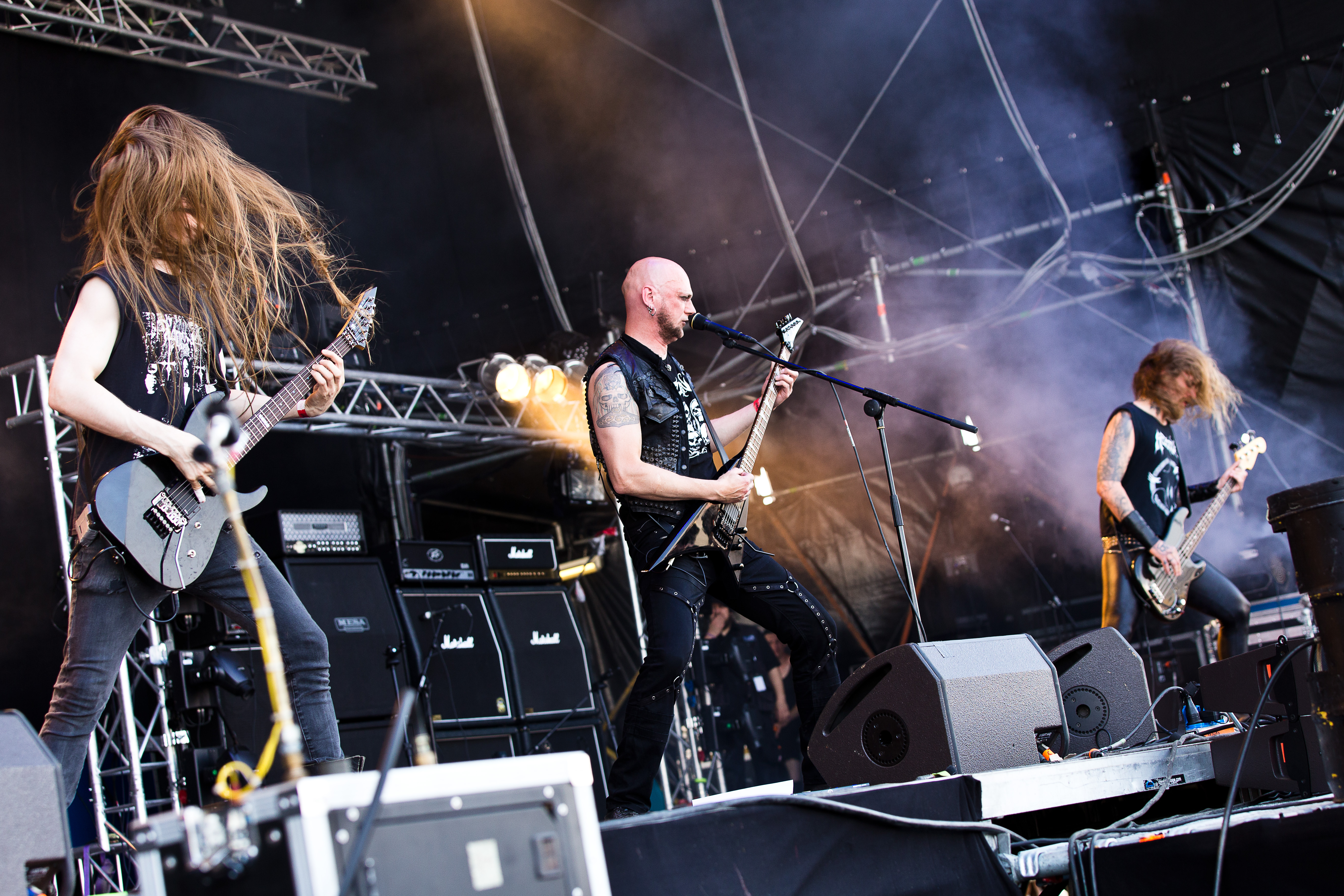
- Aeternus at Party.San Open Air 2015

Background information
- Origin: Bergen, Norway
- Genre: Blackened death metal
- Years active: 1993–present
- Labels: Hammerheart Records, Nocturnal Art Prod., DARK ESSENCE RECORDS
- Members: Ares; Gorm; Phobos; Eld
- Past members: Morrigan; Vrolok; Radek; Stian; S. Winter; V'gandr
- Website: www.aeternus.no

Aeternus is a Norwegian blackened death metal band from Bergen. It was formed in 1993 by Ronny Hovland, alias Ares, and Erik Heggernes, a.k.a. Vrolok. In 1996, bassist Nicola Trier, a.k.a. Morrigan, joined the duo, forming a three-piece that recorded the band's first two albums. Morrigan created the band's trademark ravens-and-axes logo.

== History ==
For the first two albums, the band called their style "dark metal". They released their debut album, Beyond the Wandering Moon, in 1997 on Hammerheart Records (now Karmageddon Media), and toured with black metal bands Emperor and Limbonic Art through Europe. Their second album, ...And So the Night Became, was released in 1998, accompanied by a tour supporting Deicide, and was later re-released in different formats.

In 1999, they added guitarist Radek and moved from darkened black metal toward a faster, more aggressive death metal sound for 1999's Shadows of Old. Morrigan left the group in 2001 for personal reasons and was replaced with V'gandr, of Norwegian Viking metal band Helheim. Later that year, they released their fourth full-length album, Ascension of Terror, and played some live shows. They departed Hammerheart Records and split with Radek. Their next album, A Darker Monument, was released on the Nocturnal Art Productions label in 2003. After the release of their sixth full-length, HeXaeon, Vrolok left the band and was replaced with drummer S. Winter early in 2006. The group toured Europe later that year to support the album. In September 2007, S. Winter left the group.

The band entered a lull between 2008 and 2011. V'gandr left the band to concentrate on his band Helheim and continued to be a session member with Norwegian black metal band Taake. Ares reformed the band with drummer Phobos and guitarist Specter. Work on a new album began. The new line-up returned to the stage in 2013 and released their seventh album, ...And the Seventh His Soul Detesteth.

== Members ==
=== Current ===
- Ares – vocals, guitar (1993–present)
- Gorm – guitar (2018–present)
- Eld – bass (2012–present)
- Phobos – drums (2007–present)

=== Former ===
- Lava – guitar (1999–2004)
- Dreggen – guitar (2005–2010)
- Specter – guitar (2010–2017)
- Ørjan – bass (1993–1996)
- Morrigan – bass, keyboards (1996–2001)
- V'gandr – bass (2001–2012)
- Vrolok – drums (1993–2006)

=== Live ===
- Stanley – guitar (2004–2005)
- S. Winter – drums (2006–2007)

== Discography ==
- Walk My Path (Demo, 1994)
- Dark Sorcery (EP, View Beyond Records, 1995; re-released on Hammerheart Records, 1997)
- Beyond the Wandering Moon (Hammerheart, 1997)
- ...And So the Night Became (Hammerheart, 1998)
- Dark Rage (7-inch EP, 1998)
- Shadows of Old (Hammerheart, 2000)
- Burning the Shroud (EP, Martyr Records/Hammerheart, 2001)
- Ascension of Terror (Martyr, 2001)
- Demo 2002 (Demo, 2002)
- A Darker Monument (Candlelight Records, 2003)
- HeXaeon (Karisma Records/Dark Essence Records, 2006)
- ...And the Seventh His Soul Detesteth (Dark Essence Records) (2013)
- Heathen (Dark Essence Records, 2018)
- Philosopher (Agonia Records, 2023)
