= Dunderbeist =

Norwegian metal band

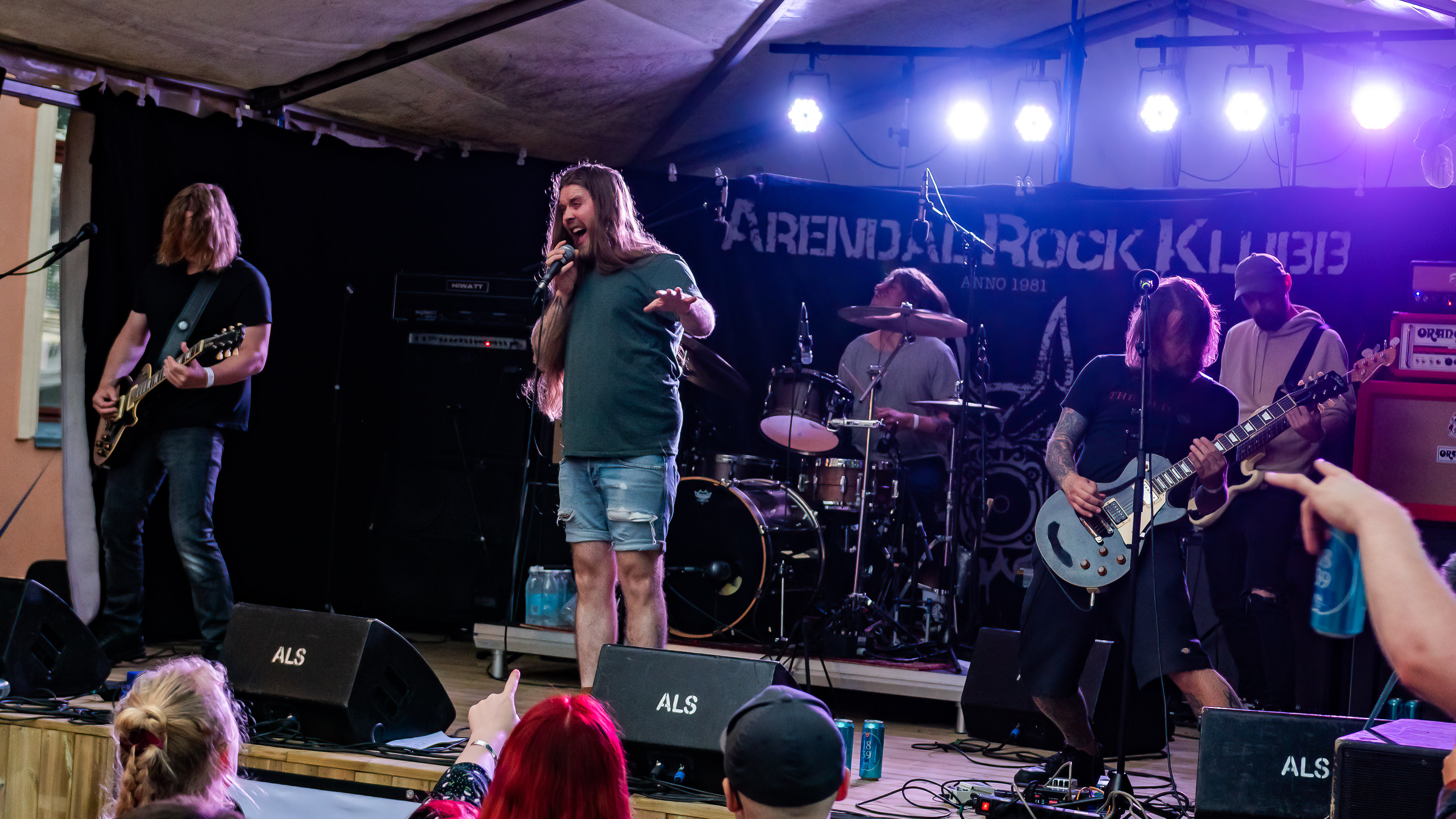
- Dunderbeist in 2021

Background information
- Origin: Hamar, Norway
- Genres: Alternative metal, Hard rock, Progressive rock
- Years active: 2007–
- Labels: Indie Recordings

Dunderbeist (sort of Norwegian for "Noisy Beast") is a heavy metal band from Hedmark in Norway.

== Career ==
The band was formed by former members of Krace, KITE and Stonegard. Dunderbeist has been recording since 2008, releasing several albums and touring extensively. The five-piece band now releases material outside Norway following its first international album, Black Arts & Crooked Tails.

Songs of the Buried continued where Black Arts & Crooked Tails left off, but is darker, heavier and more progressive, both musically and lyrically. Death was a recurring theme on the album, portraying death as the end of something but the beginning of something else.

Most of the band's albums since 2011 are recorded in Dunderbeist's own "pigsty" studio in Hamar, Norway, and mixed by the guitarist Fredrik Ryberg. The mastering is carried out by Alan Douches of Mastodon, Converge, and Kvelertak fame.

For the recording of their album Uro (2021), the band travelled to an island outside of Kragerø, where they spent two weeks in isolation, writing and recording. The album was finished by 2020, but the release was postponed due to the pandemic.

The Indie Recordings label releases Dunderbeist's work.

In January 2022, the band announced that they would release a new song on the last Friday of every month. The released tracks would eventually make up a new album, set for release in January 2023. The song "Stormen" was to be the first track to be released on the last Friday of January 2022.

== Members ==
- Torgrim Torve – lead vocals, guitar
- Fredrik Ryberg – guitar
- Kristian Liljan – bass guitar
- Ronny Flissundet – guitar
- John Birkeland Hansen – drums

== Discography ==
- 2008: Second Hand Theft
- 2009: 8 crows & Counting
- 2010: Rovmord (EP)
- 2011: Dunderbeist
- 2012: Black Arts & Crooked Tails
- 2012: Songs Of The Buried
- 2015: Hyklere
- 2017: Tvilja (EP)
- 2021: URO
