= Thomas Hansen (musician) =

Norwegian alternative country musician

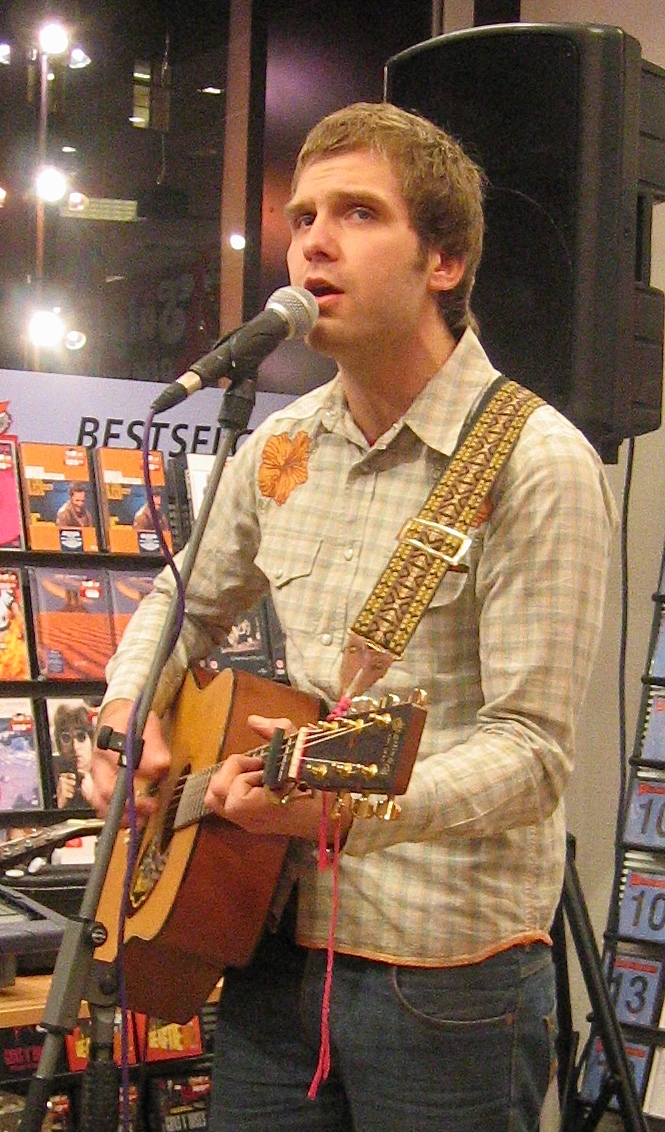
St-Thomas, live at Bergen, Norway Photo: Nina Aldin Thune

Thomas Hansen (13 February 1976 – 5 September 2007) was a Norwegian alternative country musician performing under the name Saint Thomas (previously St. Thomas).

He became a musician after quitting his job as a mailman after hearing music from Elliott Smith and Will Oldham. He formed a short-lived band called Emily Lang before attempting solo work. His music caught the eye of a very small Norwegian label, which released 200 copies of his debut 7" "Songs," and the French label Darjeeling Sounds released his first proper album Surfer's Morning in limited numbers.

Hansen's biggest break came shortly after Norway's Quart Festival in 1999, where he got signed to Racing Junior. His first album, I'm Coming Home, was preceded by "The Cornerman EP," which was a summer chart success in Norway in 2001. The album then received international releases throughout 2002.

Hansen since released three other albums, and also toured Europe with Lambchop and the United States in 2005 with Of Montreal. His next album, Children Of The New Brigade, was released in August 2005 in Norway by Racing Junior. His work was also released on Misra Records.

In August 2006, Saint Thomas released a new album, officially his sixth, There's Only One of Me on his own label, Cornerman Records. The album was also licensed to Make My Day Records for release in Germany, Austria and Switzerland and to Irish label yesboyicecream records for release in the UK and Ireland.

The track 'St. Thomas', from the album Problems (a 'side project' of The Broken Family Band singer Steven Adams), is named after Thomas Hansen.

Thomas Hansen was found dead on 10 September 2007, aged 31. The cause of death was determined to be an "unfortunate combination of prescribed drugs".

== Discography ==
A complete discography, with demos and previous works, is available at the fansite's discography page.

- Surfer's Morning (1999)
- Songs EP (1999)
- Mysterious Walks (2000)
- The Cornerman EP (2001)
- I'm Coming Home (2001)
- A Long Long Time EP (2003)
- Hey Harmony (2003)
- Live In Europe (2003)
- Winter Sprinter EP (2004)
- Let's Grow Together - The Comeback Of St. Thomas (2004)
- Morning Dancer EP (2005)
- Children Of The New Brigade (2005)
- There's Only One Of Me (2006)
- St. Thomas (2008)
