= Tales from Eternal Dusk =

Studio album by Dark Fortress
- Released: 17 March 2001
- Genre: Melodic black metal
- Length: 52:12
- Label: Red Stream
- Producer: Self-produced

Dark Fortress chronology
Towards Immortality (1997)	Tales from Eternal Dusk (2001)	Profane Genocidal Creations (2003)

Tales from Eternal Dusk is the first full album of the German melodic black metal band Dark Fortress. This was the band's debut album and was released on 17 March 2001. Though the album was released in 2001, the vinyl version of this album was released four years later, in 2005.

On 15 October 2005, a limited double LP version of Tales from Eternal Dusk was released for €15,- through mailorder and directly from the band. The vinyl version contained 2 bonus tracks: Into My Deepest Desire and Eye of the Greyhound.

== Tracks ==
1. "The Arcanum of the Cursed" – 1:44
2. "Pilgrim of the Nightly Spheres" – 4:14
3. "Twilight" – 4:41
4. "Apocalypse" – 3:39
5. "Dreaming... (Chapter I)" – 4:17
6. "Throne of Sombre Thoughts (Chapter II)" – 5:07
7. "Captured in Eternity's Eyes (Chapter III)" – 4:18
8. "Misanthropic Invocation" – 5:49
9. "Crimson Tears" – 6:45
10. "Tales from Eternal Dusk" – 8:35
11. "Moments of Mournful Splendour (At the Portal to Infinity)" – 3:03

=== Vinyl bonus tracks ===
- "Into My Deepest Desire"
- "Eye of the Greyhound"

== Personnel ==
Additional personnel

- Christophe Szpajdel – logo
