= Séance (album) =

Studio album by Dark Fortress
- Released: 30 January 2006
- Recorded: August 2005 – October 2005
- Genre: Melodic black metal
- Length: 62:58
- Label: Century Media
- Producer: Self-produced

Dark Fortress chronology
Stab Wounds (2004)	Séance (2006)	Eidolon (2008)

Séance is the fourth studio album by German melodic black metal band Dark Fortress. The album was released on 30 January 2006 through German record label Century Media Records. Alex Krull mastered the album in the Mastersound Studios and the whole layout of the booklet was designed by Travis Smith. The original album version comes with a 12-page booklet.

== Track listing ==
1. "Ghastly Indoctrination" – 7:39
2. "CataWomb" – 6:41
3. "Requiem Grotesque" – 6:50
4. "While They Sleep" – 7:11
5. "To Harvest the Artefacts of Mockery" – 4:11
6. "Poltergeist" – 5:56
7. "Revolution: Vanity" – 5:14
8. "Incide" – 5:20
9. "Shardfigures" – 6:22
10. "Insomnia" – 6:34

=== Notes ===
1. Morean, who joined the band in 2007 after Azathoth left that same year, composed the track Incide. He was not an official band member at the time, but the band had a good relationship with him.
2. Morean also arranged the string section used in the song While They Sleep.

== Personnel ==
- Azathoth – vocals
- Asvargr – guitar
- V. Santura – guitar, mixing, vocals on While They Sleep
- Draug – bass guitar
- Paymon – keyboard
- Seraph – drums, vocals on Ghastly Indoctrination and While They Sleep

== Other credits ==
- Alex Krull – mastering
- Morean – string arrangements
- Florian Rhöse – drums co-engineering
- Jonas Baumgartl – cello
- Lisa Kraus – viola
- Loretta Loibl – violin
- Thomas Tezzele – double bass
- Christophe Szpajdel – logo
