= Florian Magnus Maier =

Florian Magnus Maier (Morean)
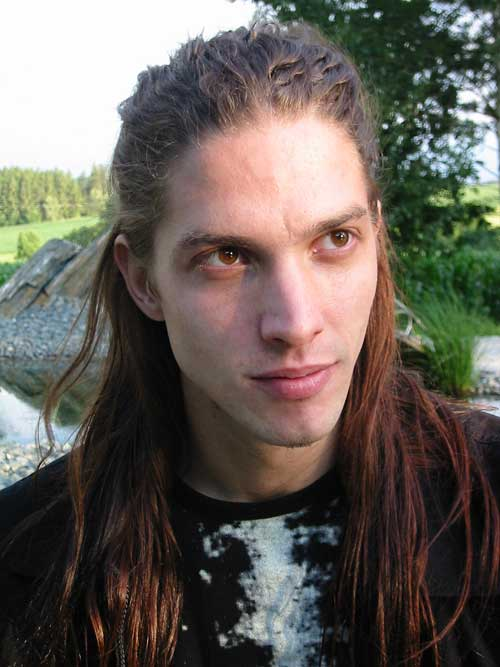

Background information
- Born: 1973 (age 52–53); Bavaria, Germany
- Origin: Germany; Netherlands
- Genres: Contemporary classical music, chamber music, flamenco, technical death metal, progressive metal, black metal
- Occupations: Composer, Guitarist
- Instrument: Guitar

Florian Magnus Maier (born 1973), known professionally as Morean, is a German classical composer, guitarist, producer, and vocalist of the bands Alkaloid, Dark Fortress, and Noneuclid. His primary occupation being a composer and guitar player within both the contemporary classical and heavy metal communities. Maier is also a vocalist and guitarist for progressive metal outfits Alkaloid and Noneuclid. Being a classical composer, Maier has also collaborated with Devin Townsend and Paradise Lost on orchestrations.

In 2014, the Dutch Public Broadcasting channel released a documentary about the life and work of Maier, highlighting his most famous classical piece, Schattenspiel.

After the departure of Erick Rutan from Morbid Angel, Maier auditioned for the lead guitarist role, and was one of the 3 runners-up to take the position, eventually delegated to Destructhor of Zyklon.

== Biography ==
Maier was born in Munich, Germany and cultivated an interest in extreme metal music since he was 13. His first band was a thrash metal group called Messenger, where he handled guitar and vocal duties. Having played for several years with his own thrash metal bands in his parents basement, at 17 he became obsessed with flamenco guitar styles and at 21 this prompted him to move to the Netherlands to study flamenco guitar with Paco Peña, and eventually classical composition with Klaas de Vries at the conservatory of Rotterdam. He credits Klaas de Vries, with his development in music. He earned his BA cum laude in composition in 2001, and has mainly worked as a composer and guitarist with orchestras and metal musicians.

Maier played flamenco guitar for 12 years, however, he was diagnosed with hypermobility in all of his joints, preventing him from using his thumb and consequentially, dropping flamenco altogether. Currently, he uses 7 and 8 string B.C. Rich and Ibanez guitars within both his own ensemble orchestrations and heavy metal bands.

== Career ==
=== Dark Fortress ===
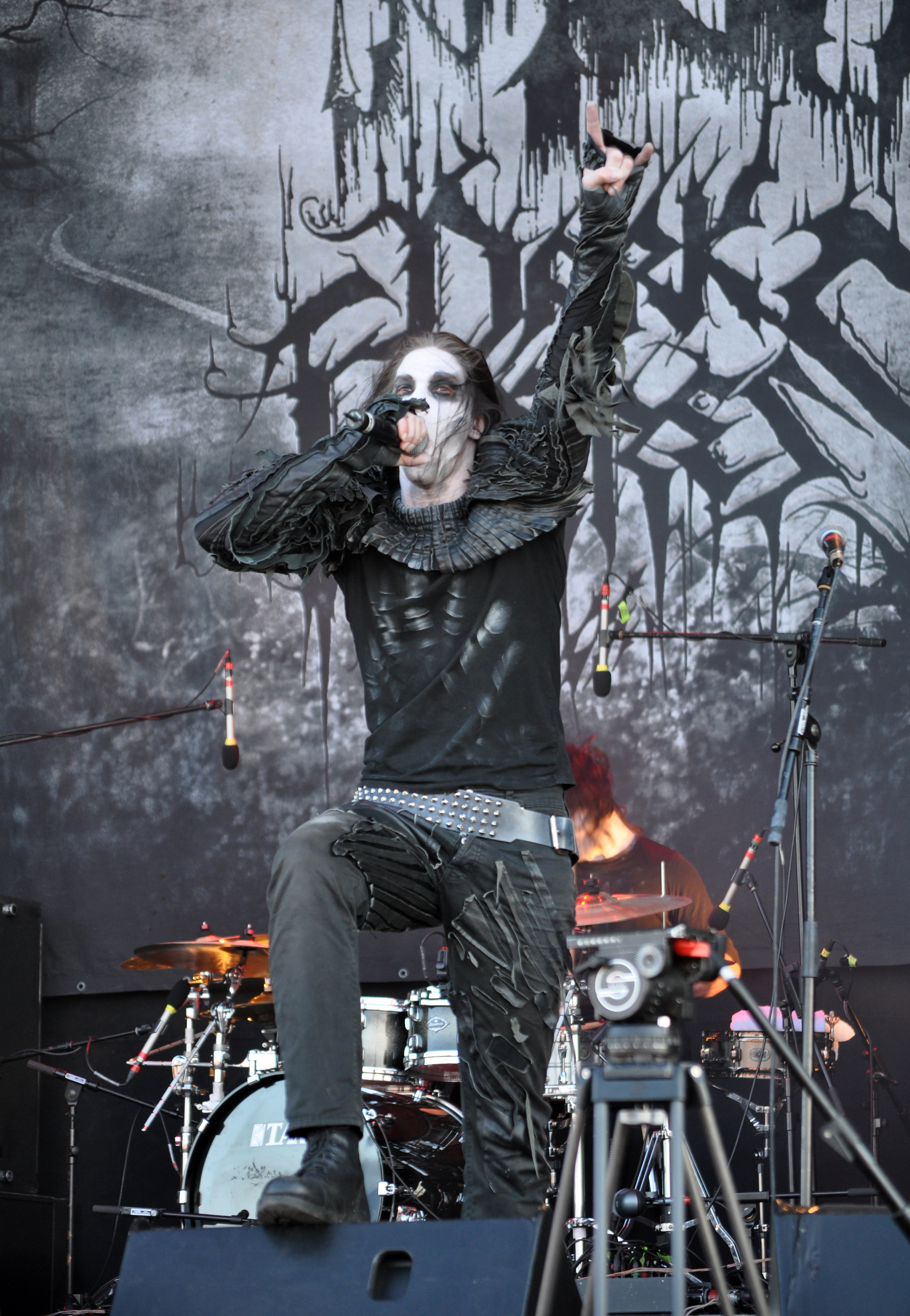
Maier appears in traditional corpsepaint with his band Dark Fortress

Maier joined the German Black Metal band Dark Fortress in 2007, and has since released 4 full records with the band. Despite his primary occupation as a composer and guitarist, he handled vocal and lyrical duties exclusively for all their records hitherto, while occasionally playing guitars as well. In particular, Maier has been influential in utilizing lyrics and imagery based on philosophical and sometimes occultist viewpoints.

When speaking about the black metal scene and adoption of corsepaint for atmospheric purposes, Maier states:

As for the image: we like to think of ourselves as sophisticated and thinking individuals... clown face on stage and go back to being a complaining, miserable cog in the machine who hates his life after the show.

=== Alkaloid ===
Progressive metal supergroup Alkaloid was formed in 2014, initially set up as a collaboration between Hannes Grossmann, Christian Münzner, Danny Tunker and Linus Klausenitzer. Grossmann invited Maier to join on guitar and vocalist duties. Maier said "it was just impossible to say no (and not join the band)". The band stated that their first record, 'The Malkuth Grimoire', did not receive support from any labels because it was too diverse and hence unmarketable. Consequently, they crowdfunded the album, receiving more than $21,000 in donations from fans across the world.

Grossmann stated that a central reason for his departure from death metal band Obscura was to collaborate with Maier. Concerning Maier's ability, Grossmann said "he is the best composer I have ever worked with". Speaking of Maier's abilities, guitarist Christian Münzner said that "The guy is probably the most amazing guitar player I ever met."

In 2014, the Netherlands Public Broadcasting network NPO released a 50-minute documentary about Maier's life and his composition of a double-guitar concerto, featuring Izhar Elias, entitled Schattenspiel for the Zaterdagmatinee, whose performance took place at the Royal Concertgebouw in Amsterdam. In this documentary, Maier speaks about his childhood, heavy metal during his formative years, familial support and transition to flamenco and classical style guitar playing and composition.

== Awards ==
- Paul Jacobs Memorial Award (2001, 2002)
- Matthijs Vermeulen Prize (2002)
- Composition Prize of the Codarts Rotterdam Conservatory (2001)

== Personal life ==
He is married to Sanja Maier-Hasagic.

== Discography ==
- Afterglow (2000)
- Transcarnation (2001)
- Plutonic (2003)
- Luciferase (2006)
- The Crawling Chaos (2006)
- Eidolon (2008)
- Ylem (2010)
- Deconstruction (2011)
- Omnivium (2011)
- Z² (2014)
- The Radial Covenant (2014)
- Metatheosis (2014)
- Venereal Dawn (2014)
- The Malkuth Grimoire (2015)
- The Crypts of Sleep (2016)
- Liquid Anatomy (2018)
- Apophenia (2019)
- Spectres from the Old World (2020)
- Numen (2023)
