= Ylem (album) =

Studio album by Dark Fortress
- Released: 22 January 2010 (Germany, Austria, Switzerland); 25 January 2010 (Europe); 9 February 2010 (USA)
- Recorded: July, 2009 – November 2009 at Woodshed Studio, Germany
- Genre: Melodic black metal
- Length: 70:20 (regular version); 74:22 (special edition version)
- Label: Century Media
- Producer: V. Santura

Dark Fortress chronology
Eidolon (2008)	Ylem (2010)	Venereal Dawn (2014)

Professional ratings
Review scores
Source	Rating
Allmusic	4/5 stars

Ylem is the sixth full-length studio release from German melodic black metal band Dark Fortress; and the second to feature new vocalist Morean. The album was released on 22 January 2010 in Germany, Austria, Switzerland and on 25 January 2010 for the rest of Europe. It was also released on 9 February 2010 in the United States. The 25 January 2010 edition had also a digipack version.

== Track listing ==
No.	Title	Length
1.	"Ylem"	6:33
2.	"As the World Keels Over"	6:36
3.	"Osiris"	7:35
4.	"Silence"	4:27
5.	"Evenfall"	5:36
6.	"Redivider"	7:07
7.	"Satan Bled"	4:36
8.	"Hirudineans"	4:56
9.	"Nemesis"	6:35
10.	"The Valley"	8:01
11.	"Wraith"	8:20

Bonus tracks

Bonus tracks on Slipsleeve version only

No.	Title	Length
12.	"Sycamore Trees"	4:02

== Personnel ==
- Morean – vocals
- V. Santura – lead guitar
- Asvargr – guitar
- Draug – bass guitar
- Paymon – keyboard
- Seraph – drums

=== Additional personnel ===
- Christophe Szpajdel – logo
