= Eidolon (album) =

Studio album by Dark Fortress
- Released: 25 February 2008
- Recorded: February 2007 – January 2008
- Genre: Melodic black metal
- Length: 51:29
- Label: Century Media
- Producer: V. Santura, Dark Fortress

Dark Fortress chronology
Séance (2006)	Eidolon (2008)	Ylem (2010)

Professional ratings
Review scores
Source	Rating
AllMusic	4/5 stars

Eidolon is the fifth studio album by German melodic black metal band Dark Fortress. The album was released on 25 February 2008 through German record label Century Media. The album has also a digipack version. The vinyl record version was released on 14 October 2016, again by Century Media.

This is the first album with Nassos as a real band member. Morean already appeared on Séance as the composer of the song Incide and the arranger of the string section used in the song While They Sleep. The reason he became a member was based on his musical and vocal abilities, his personage and dedication to extreme and dark music. He is responsible for the lyrical concept of Eidolon.

This release is a concept album based on the Greek idea of an astral double, which is similar to the German concept of a doppelgänger.

EIDOLON is a concept album which in its nine chapters describes the initiation, dehumanization and unearthly rebirth of a transcending soul by mirror magic and astral projection.

— Dark Fortress

== Track listing ==
No.	Title	Lyrics	Music	Length
1.	"The Silver Gate"	Morean	V. Santura	6:50
2.	"Cohorror"	Morean	Asvargr	5:37
3.	"Baphomet[feat. Tom Gabriel Fischer]"	Morean	V. Santura, Asvargr, Seraph	6:24
4.	"The Unflesh"	Morean	V. Santura	5:08
5.	"Analepsy"	Morean	V. Santura	6:01
6.	"Edge of Night""	Morean, Mina	V. Santura	3:56
7.	"No Longer Human"	Morean	V. Santura	6:22
8.	"Catacrusis"	Morean	V. Santura	4:33
9.	"Antiversum"	Morean	V. Santura, Seraph	7:22

=== Notes ===
1. Thomas Gabriel Fischer (Celtic Frost, Triptykon) appears as a guest vocalist on the song Baphomet.
2. A video of the song Edge of Night was made and can be viewed at their MySpace page.

== Personnel ==
Dark Fortress

- Morean – vocals
- V. Santura – lead guitar
- Asvargr – guitar
- Draug – bass guitar
- Paymon – keyboard
- Seraph – drums

Additional musicians and production

- Thomas Gabriel Fischer – vocals on Baphomet
- V. Santura – production, recording, engineering, mixing and mastering
- Christophe Szpajdel – logo

== Release dates ==
Release dates are confirmed by their website.

February 15, 2008	February 22, 2008	February 25, 2008	February 26, 2008	February 27, 2008	March 11, 2008
AU	DE, AT, NL, LU, CH, IT	UK, FR, GR, DK, NO, Rest of Europe	ES, PT	SE, FI, HU	US
