= HeXaeon =

Studio album by Aeternus
- Released: 2006
- Genre: Death metal
- Label: Karisma Records

Aeternus chronology
A Darker Monument (2003)	HeXaeon (2006)	...And the Seventh His Soul Detesteth (2013)

HeXaeon is the sixth studio album by Norwegian death metal band Aeternus.

Even though drummer S. Winter is mentioned officially at the credits of the album, all drums were recorded by Erik Vrolok a bit before he left the band.

== Track listing ==
1. The Darkest of Minds
2. Godhead Charlatan
3. The 9th Revolution
4. In the 3rd Dwells Oblivion
5. Hexaeon
6. Punished
7. Ageless Void
8. Christbait
9. What I Crave

== Personnel ==
- Ares - guitars, lead vocals, bass (5)
- V'gandr - bass (all but 5), backing vocals
- Erik - drums

== Reception ==
Professional ratings
Review scores
Source	Rating
Metal Temple	8/10 stars

The album was described as classic, old-school death metal with raw production. It was well received by the media and the fans, opening the way for the Bergens Metalfestival Hole In the Sky in 2006.
