= Profane Genocidal Creations =

Studio album by Dark Fortress
- Released: 27 February 2003
- Genre: Melodic black metal
- Length: 68:27
- Label: Red Stream
- Producer: Self-produced

Dark Fortress chronology
Tales From Eternal Dusk (2001)	Profane Genocidal Creations (2003)	Stab Wounds (2004)

Profane Genocidal Creations is the second full album by German melodic black metal band Dark Fortress. It was released on 27 February 2003. The album was rereleased in 2017 through German record label Century Media.

== Track listing ==
1. "Introduction" – 1:45
2. "Defiance of Death" – 8:36
3. "Passage to Extinction" – 9:11
4. "In Morte Aeternitas" – 9:04
5. "Moribound Be Thy Creation" – 6:19
6. "Through Ages of War" – 6:05
7. "Blood of the Templars" – 7:20
8. "Warlord (Face the Angel of Pestilence)" – 5:02
9. "Battles Rage in the Infernal Depth" – 6:49
10. "A Fortress Dark" – 8:16

Total playing time: 68:27

== Personnel ==
Additional personnel

- Christophe Szpajdel – logo
