= Carlo Barone =

Italian musician

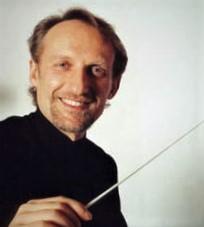
Carlo Barone

Carlo Barone (born in Vigevano in 1955) is a classical guitarist and conductor specializing in the performance practice of 19th-century music, especially 19th-century guitar works.

He is director of the Accademia "l'Ottocento" (Academy of Nineteenth-Century Music) a non-profit Association active since 1982, in Lecce (Italy) and France; which documents and publishes original 19th-century musical material and researches the performance practice of this musical era. Carlo Barone conducts international courses, masterclasses and lectures on the interpretation of 19th-century musical works, e.g. by composers such as Mauro Giuliani and Fernando Sor.

Barone is the conductor of Orchestra dell’Accademia l’Ottocento which performs on original classical period instruments.

As a performer Barone uses historical period guitars by luthiers such as Guadagnini, Soriot, Garganese, Lacôte, etc.
