= Stonegard =

Norwegian metal band

Background information
- Origin: Oslo, Norway
- Genres: Stoner metal, groove metal, alternative metal
- Years active: 1997–2008
- Labels: Bells Go Clang!, Candlelight
- Members: Torgrim Torve; Ronny Flissundet; Håvard Gjerde; Erlend Gjerde
- Website: stonegard.org

Stonegard was a Norwegian heavy metal band from Oslo, active between 1997–2008. They have two official releases in the form of full-length CDs: Arrows and From Dusk till Doom.

== History ==
The band released their first CD Arrows on Candlelight Records in 2005. They received excellent reviews from national newspapers television and radio in Norway, and was nominated for the Spellemannprisen award and the alternative Alarm-prisen (showcasing music not yet on the A-lists).

As a new band, Stonegard successfully promoted themselves through the Norwegian website NRK Urørt, which helps unsigned bands, singers, and musicians.

Their motto is "Mer metal til folket", which translates to "More metal to the people." Stonegard was strongly against drugs.

Several Stonegard music videos have run on the popular Norwegian TV show Svisj and the pay-channel ZTV. From Arrows, the songs "Barricades", "Arrows" and "Hunter" received air time throughout 2005, as did the title track of their second album From Dusk till Doom in 2008.

In the late autumn of 2008 the band was booked to tour Europe with Enslaved, but a month before kickoff they decided to disband and cancel the assignment. Audrey Horne took their place on the poster.

=== After Stonegard ===
Erlend Gjerde, together with Agnete Kjølsrud, went on to form the hard rock/metal band band Djerv, famed for their contributions to gaming soundtracks. By 2022, their song "Get Jinxed" from League of Legends had more than 120 million views on YouTube.

Brother Håvard is a member of the heavy rock band Rockebandet Ændal, while Torve and Flissundet founded the metal band Dunderbeist.

== Band members ==
- Torgrim Torve – guitar, lead vocals
- Ronny Flissundet – guitar, backing vocals
- Håvard Gjerde – bass, backing vocals
- Erlend Gjerde – drums

== Discography ==
- 2005: Arrows (Candlelight Records)
- 2006: From Dusk till Doom (Bells Go Clang!) NOR No. 14
