= Grimfist =

Norwegian blackened death metal band

- Origin: Oslo, Norway
- Genres: Black metal; thrash metal; death metal; groove metal
- Years active: 2001–present
- Label: Candlelight Records
- Members: Frediablo; Ole Walaunet; Dreggen; Christian Svendsen
- Website: grimfist.com

Grimfist is a Norwegian blackened death metal band from Oslo. Founded in October 2001, they released two albums on Candlelight Records.

== History ==
The band recorded their debut album, Ghouls of Grandeur, in Abyss Studios in Sweden, in March 2003. Peter Tägtgren mixed it. The record was well received by critics who noted the band's mix of heavy metal, black metal and death metal. The lineup consisted of guitarist Ole Walaunet (Deride), drummer Horgh (Immortal, Hypocrisy), and vocalist Frediablo (ex-Necrophagia, Gorelord, Hemnur).

Horgh left the band in 2004 to focus on Hypocrisy. He was replaced with Christian Svendsen (a.k.a. "Anti Christian") of bands like Tsjuder and The Cumshots. Robin Eaglestone of Cradle of Filth played live bass in the band in 2005–2006.

In 2005, Grimfist released Ten Steps to Hell. The record received 4/5 points in Kerrang! magazine. Tours with Susperia and Red Harvest followed.

In September 2005, the band's vocalist Frediablo quit all his musical projects and bands except for Grimfist. He left Grimfist in August 2006, tired of the music scene.

In August 2008, Frediablo rejoined Grimfist.

== Band members ==
=== Current members ===
- Frediablo - vocals
- Ole Walaunet - guitar, bass
- Birger Larsen - bass
- Christian Svendsen (a.k.a. Anti Christian) - drums

=== Former members ===
- Tommy Hjelm - vocals
- Reidar Horghagen (a.k.a. Horgh) - drums
- Robin Eaglestone - bass
- Dreggen - bass
- Ares - bass (live only)
- Dustin Perle - drums

== Discography ==
- Ghouls of Grandeur - Candlelight Records (2003)
- Ten Steps to Hell - Candlelight Records (2005)
