= Dark Fortress =

German melodic black metal band

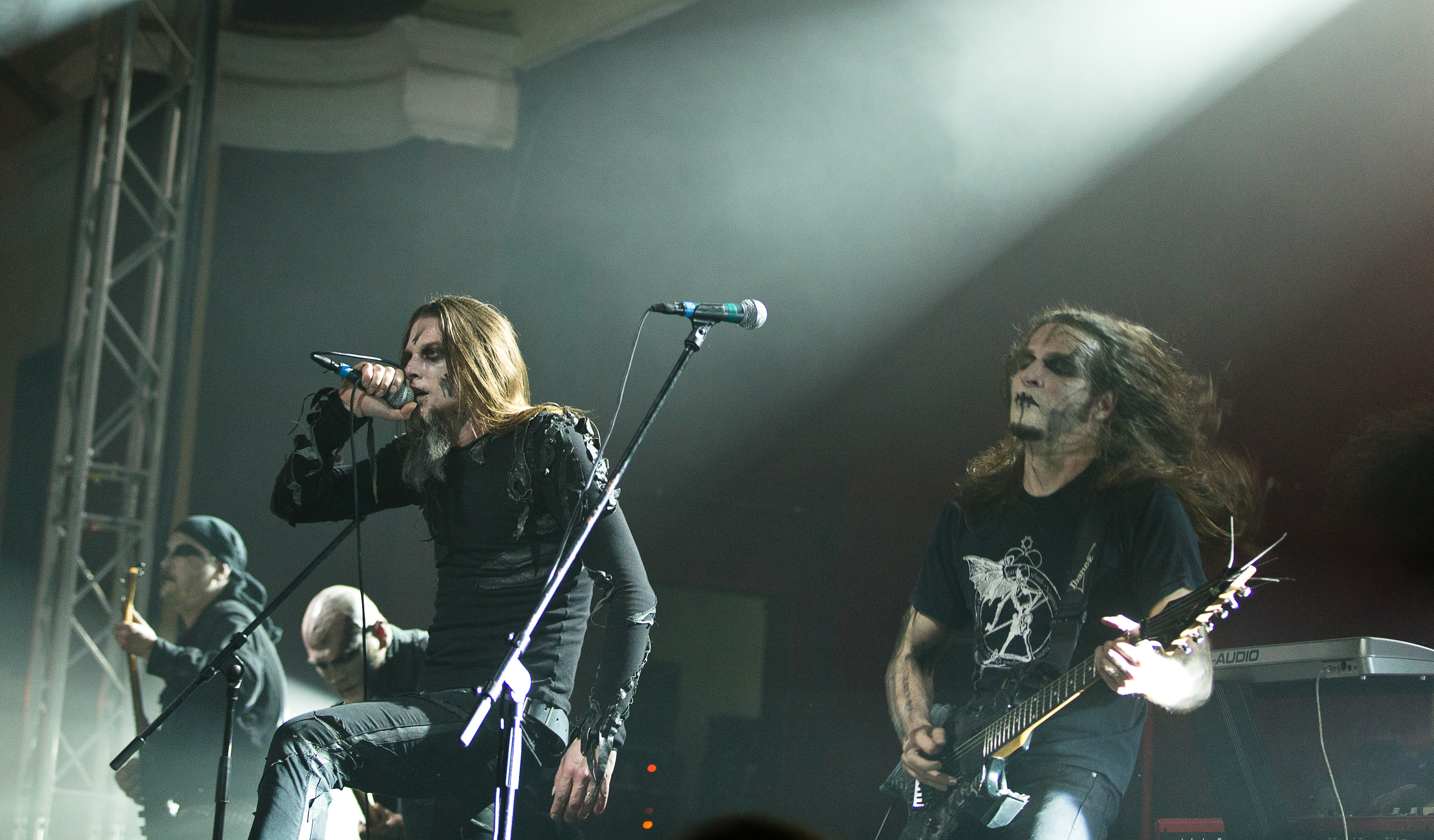
- Dark Fortress at the Wave-Gotik-Treffen 2016

Background information
- Origin: Landshut, Germany
- Genre: Melodic black metal
- Years active: 1994–2023
- Label: Century Media
- Past members: Morean; Asvargyr; V. Santura; Phenex; Seraph; Draug; Paymon; Azathoth; Njord; Zoltan; Charon; Crom; Thamuz; Ar; Hannes Grossman
- Website: darkfortress.org

Dark Fortress was a German melodic black metal band formed in 1994 in Landshut. They released seven studio albums, a split album and a demo album. The band broke up in 2023.

== History ==
=== Early history ===
The band formed in 1994. In 1996, they released the demo Rebirth of the Dark Age. In 1997, the original line-up, consisting of founder Asvargr (guitar), vocalist Azathoth, Njord on bass, and drummer Charon, was completed with second guitarist Crom and keyboardist Thamuz. Debuting live in February 1997, the band played with Lunar Aurora, Disaster and Naglfar. Dark Fortress' first label release was the Towards Immortality split MCD with Barad Dür, which featured two new tracks by the band and was released on Fog of the Apocalypse Records. A third track was recorded during the same session and used for the compilation CD From The Mystic Forest – Part II. The band continued composing their first full-length album, but recording was postponed from 1998 until August 2000, when Dark Fortress entered Klangschmiede Studio E with Markus Stock (of Empyrium) and completed the album Tales From Eternal Dusk.

=== Changes ===
Recorded at Grieghallen Studio in Norway (Mayhem, Emperor, Immortal), Profane Genocidal Creations was delayed due to problems with mixing/mastering. It was released in February 2003 and showcased Dark Fortress' traditional black metal and their progression as musicians. With a stable line-up consisting of Azathoth (vocals), Asvargr (guitar), Santura (guitar), Draug (bass), Paymon (keyboards) and Seraph (drums), more live shows and festival appearances followed. Dark Fortress shared stages with Behemoth, Impaled Nazarene, Pungent Stench, and God Dethroned, and many underground acts.

=== 2000–present ===
The 2004 release of Stab Wounds (Black Attakk) was accompanied by artwork by Travis Smith (Opeth, Nevermore, Anathema, Death). Stab Wounds was well received by the band's following and the mainstream metal press. The album contained melancholy melodies and suicidal themes. A cover of Katatonia's "Endtime" was included on the limited CD Digipak, and a cover of Emperor's "I Am The Black Wizards" was featured on the double-LP version, released by Imperium Records in 2005.

On 13 May 2007, they fired vocalist Azathoth due to non-musical reasons. His replacement was Morean.

Their next album was Séance, accompanied by Smith's artwork. The album is a concept album about the contrast between the present and the future, the fragility of human existence, and the finality of death. Séance departs from typical black metal subjects and dealt with paranormal beings. The music supports this conceptual idea with gloomy guitars, twisted passages, and grim vocals.

On 29 January 2010, Dark Fortress released an official music video for the song "Hirudineans", from their 2010 album Ylem.

After two more albums, the band announced their disbandment on 15 May 2023.

== Members ==
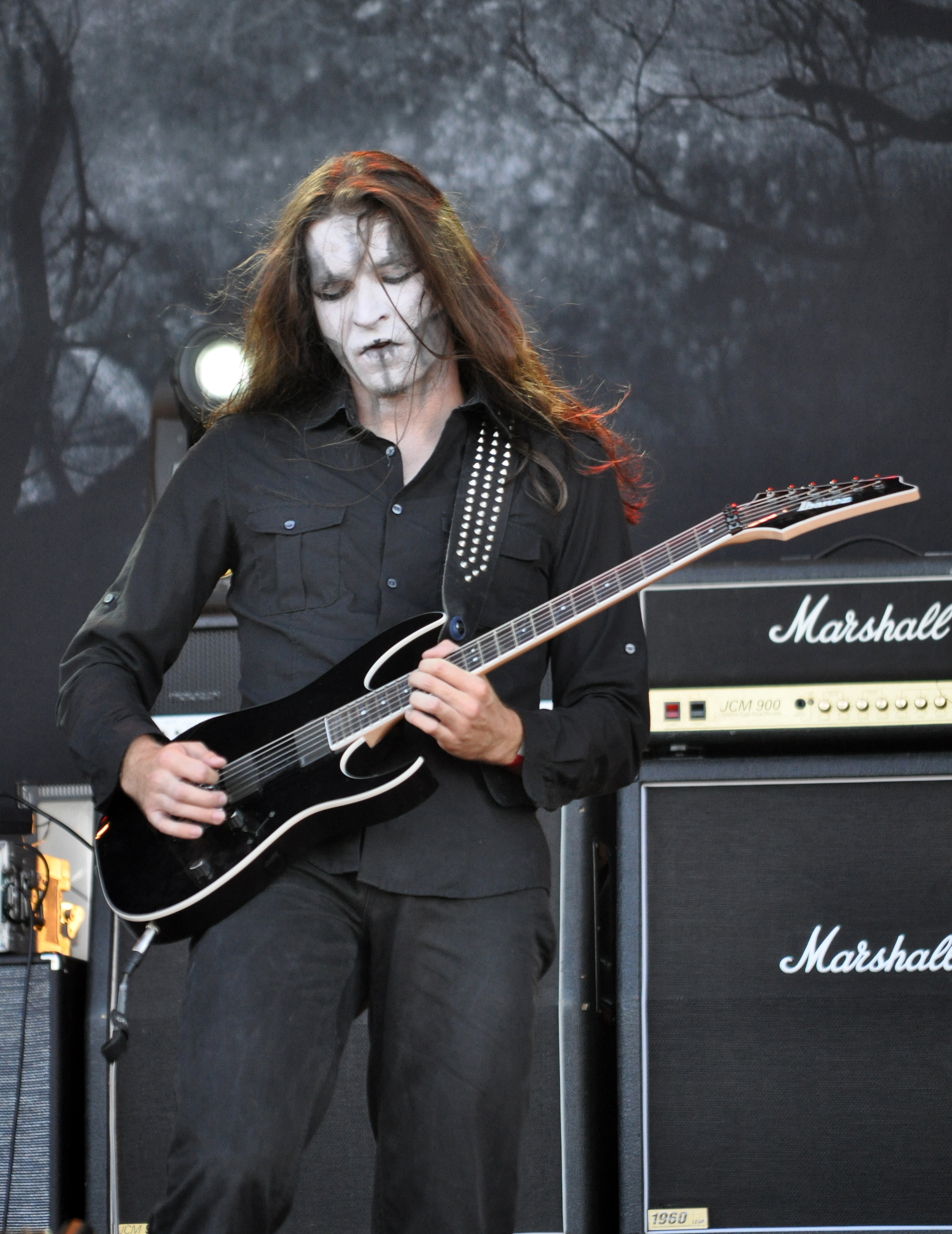
V Santura

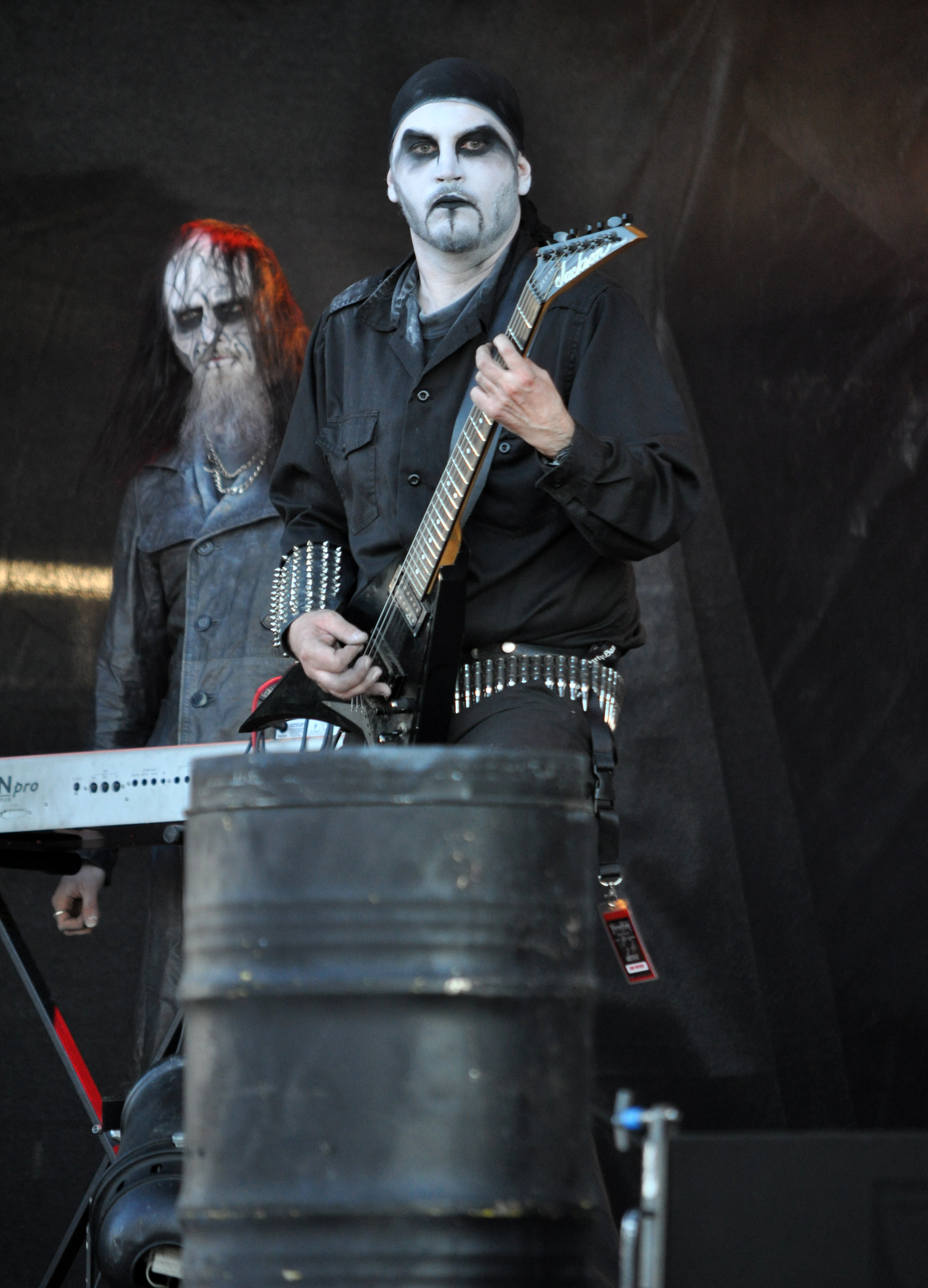
Asvargr

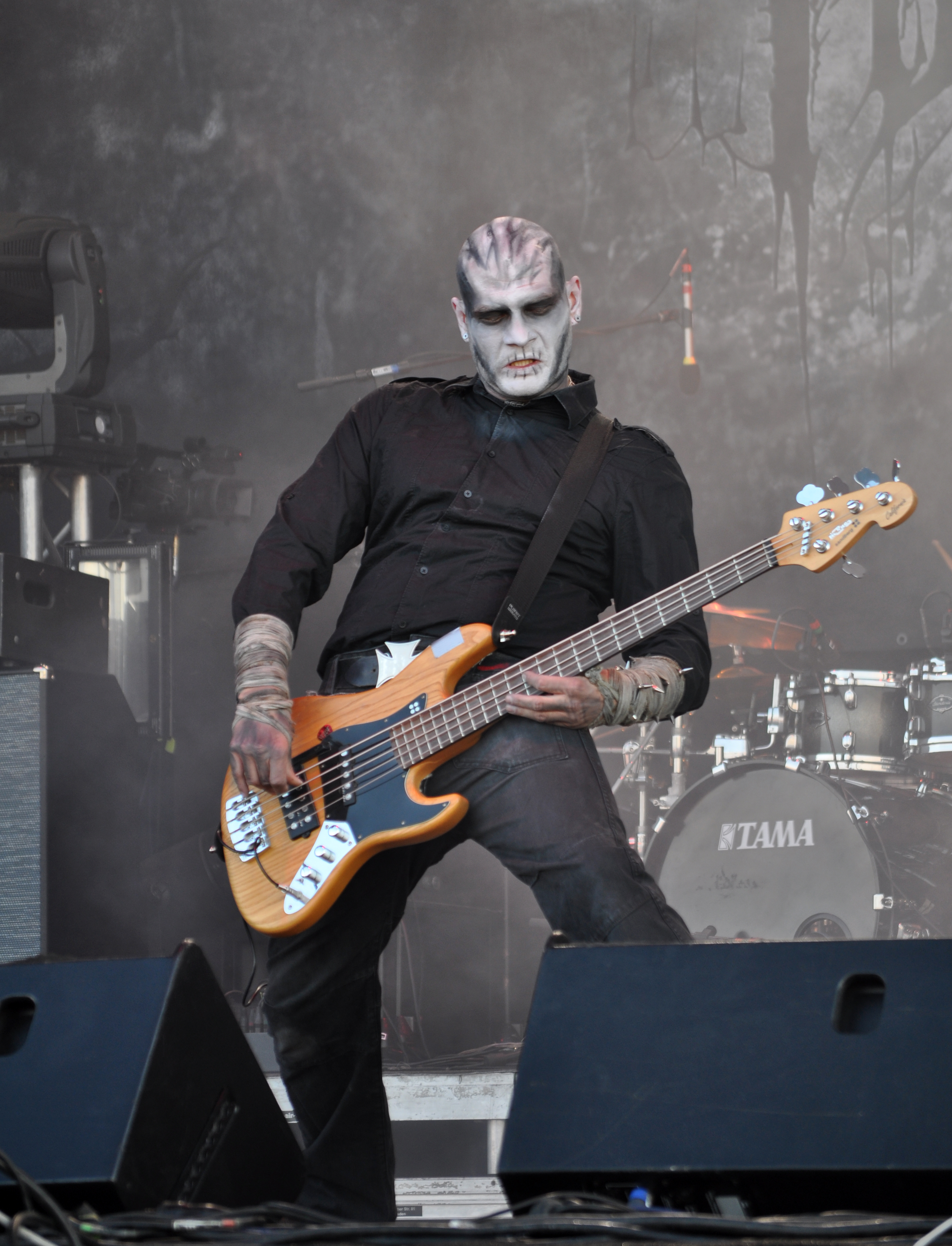
Draug

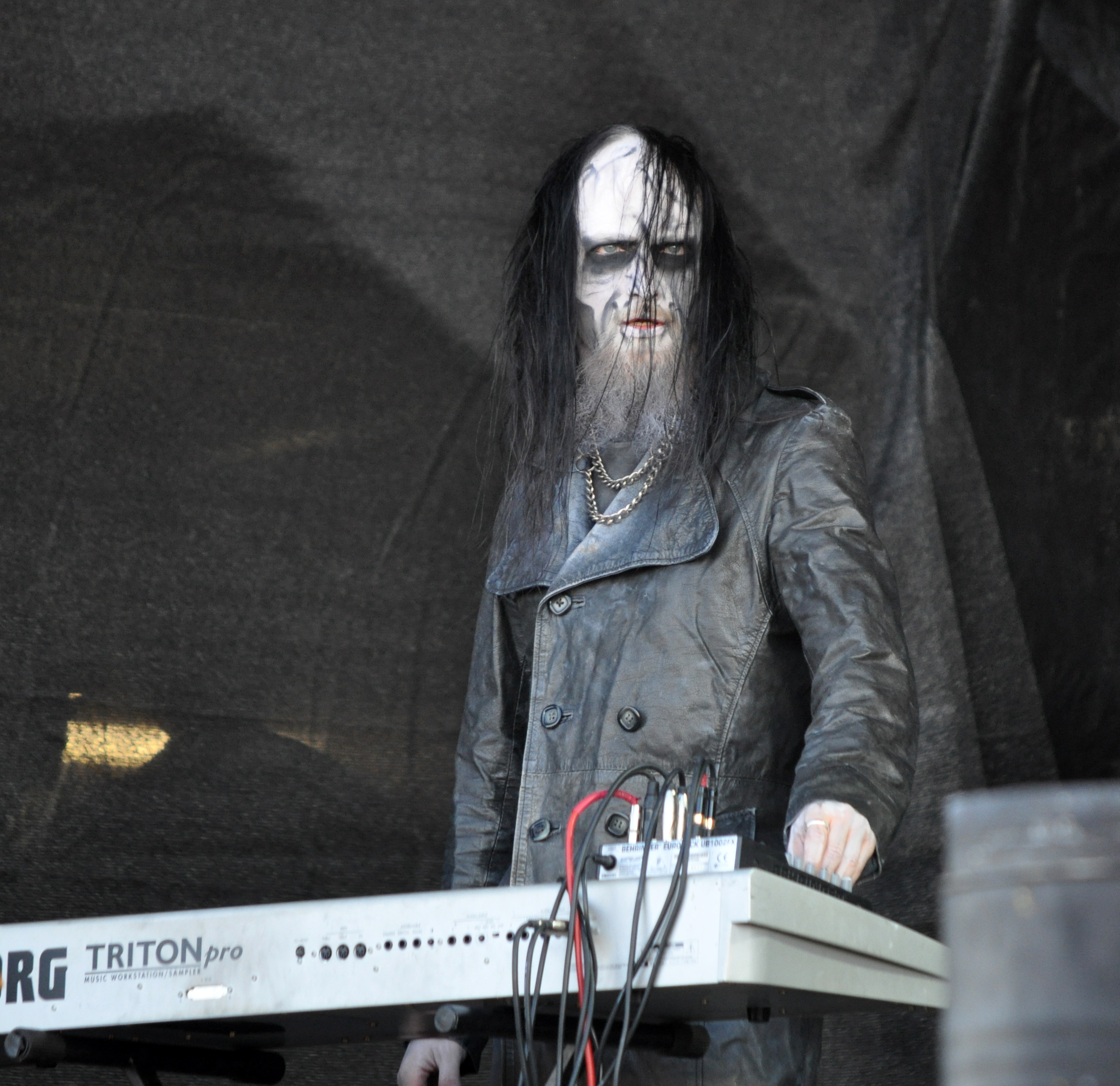
Paymon

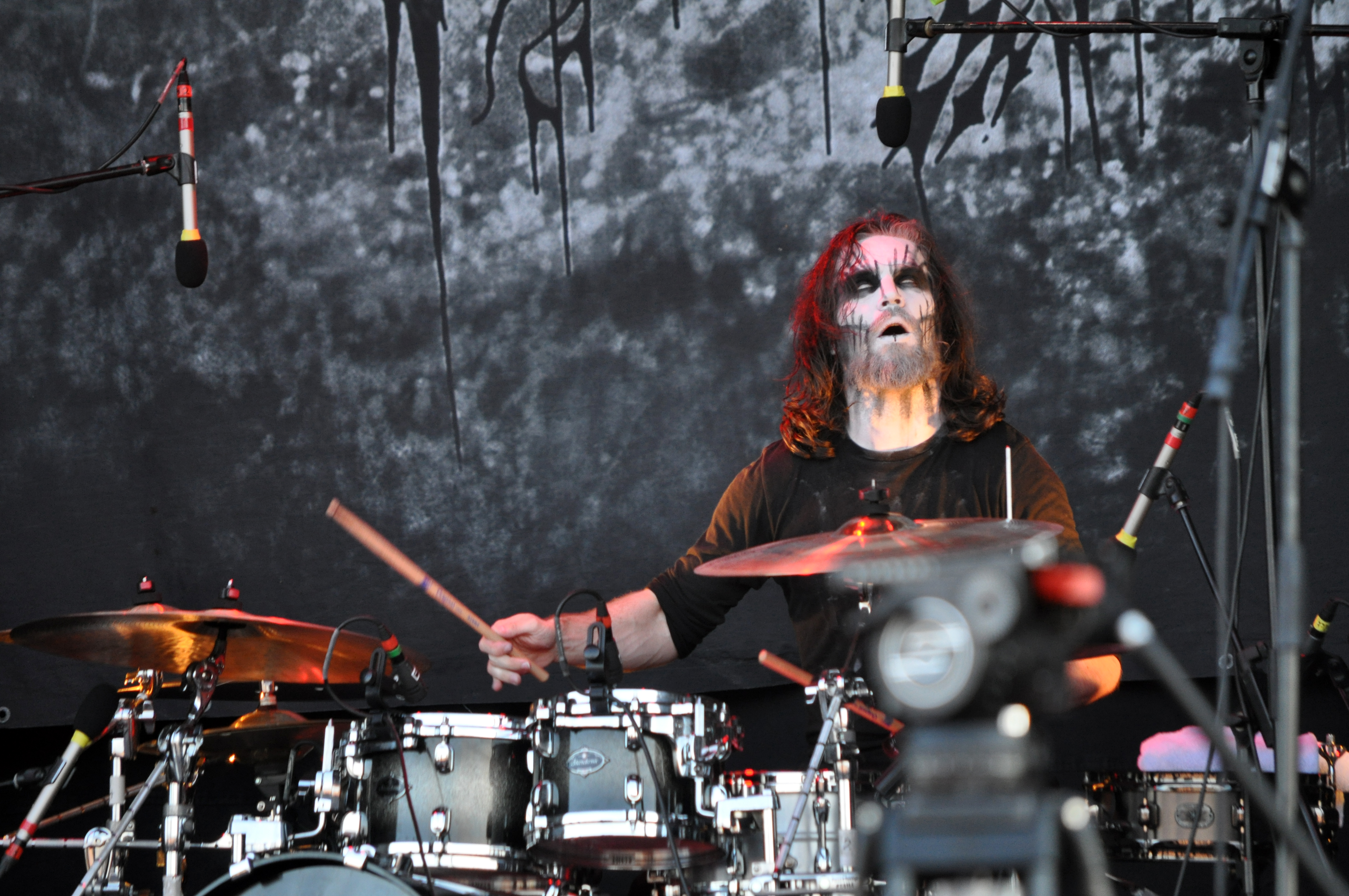
Seraph

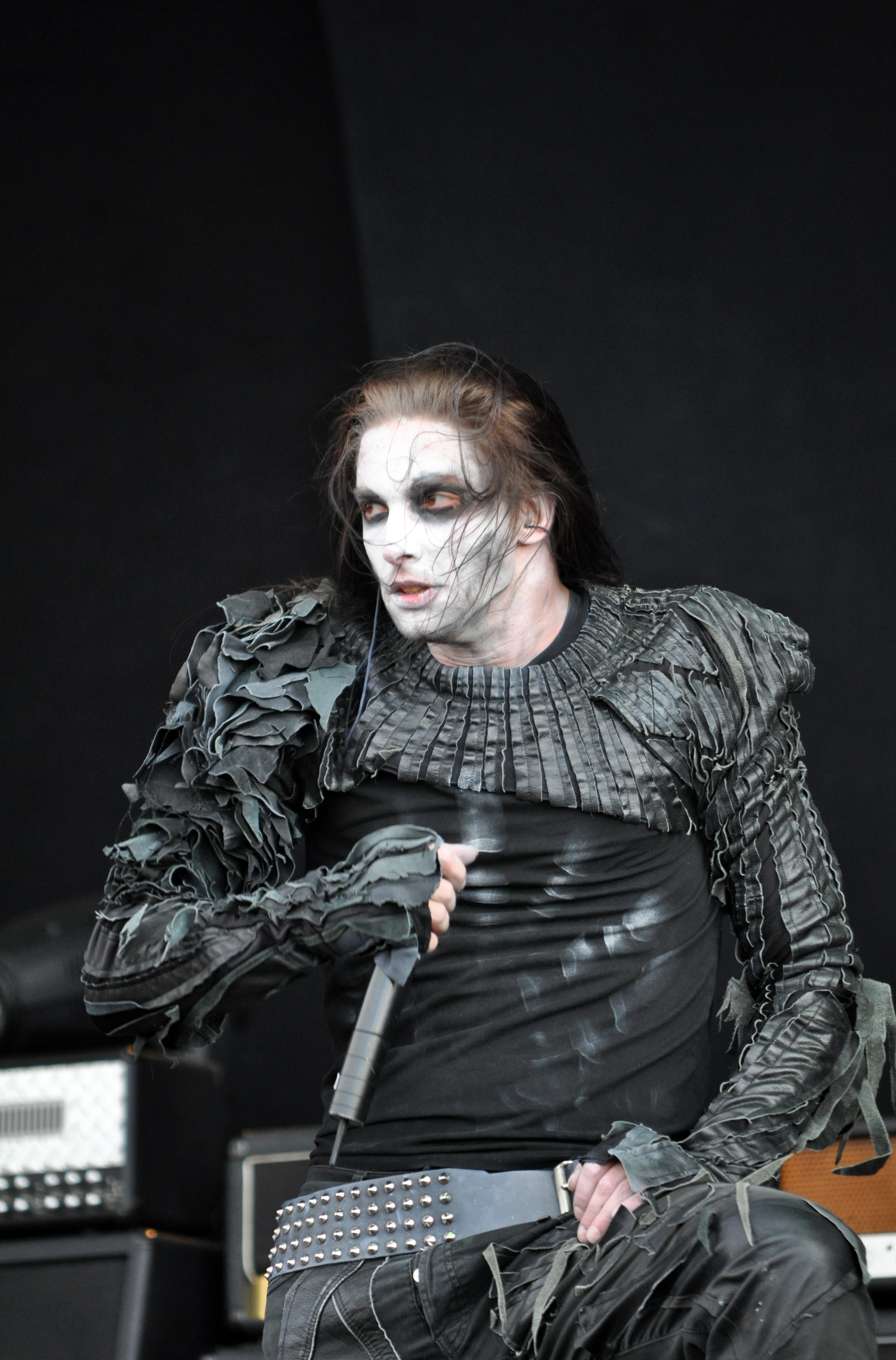
Morean

=== Final Lineup ===
- Asvargr – guitar, backing vocals (1994–2023)
- V. Santura – guitar, bass, backing vocals (2001–2023)
- Morean – lead vocals (2007–2023)
- Phenex – keyboards, backing vocals (2014–2023)
- Ar – bass (2018–2023)
- Hannes Grossmann – drums (2022–2023)

=== Former members ===
- Azathoth – lead vocals (1994–2007)
- Crom – guitar, backing vocals (1997–2001)
- Njord – bass, backing vocals (1994–1997)
- Zoltan – bass, backing vocals (1997–2000)
- Draug – bass, backing vocals (2000–2018)
- Charon – drums, percussion (1994–2001)
- Seraph – drums, percussion (2001–2022)
- Thamuz – keyboards, backing vocals (1997–1998)
- Paymon – keyboards, backing vocals (1998–2014)

== Discography ==
- Rebirth of the Dark Age demo (1996)
- Towards Immortality split (1997)
- Tales from Eternal Dusk (2001)
- Profane Genocidal Creations (2003)
- Stab Wounds (2004)
- Séance (2006)
- Eidolon (2008)
- Ylem (2010)
- Venereal Dawn (2014)
- Spectres from the Old World (2020)
