= Guttorm Guttormsgaard =

Norwegian artist (1938–2019)

- Born: 13 September 1938; Oslo, Norway
- Died: 26 October 2019 (aged 81)
- Occupation: Visual artist
- Website: Guttormsgaards arkiv

Guttorm Guttormsgaard (13 September 1938 – 26 October 2019) was a Norwegian visual artist, educator and collector.

== Personal life ==
Guttormsgaard was born on 13 September 1938 in Oslo, to Knut Guttormsgaard and Ingeborg Stenstad. He married Karin Eie in 1940.

His children include actor, musician and screenwriter Aslag Guttormsgaard (b. 1969), and actress, screenwriter and film director Anna Gutto (b. 1977).

== Career ==
Guttormsgaard studied at the Norwegian National Academy of Craft and Art Industry under the supervision of Finn Faaborg and Chrix Dahl, and with Niels Lergaard at the Royal Danish Academy of Fine Arts. From 1967 to 1973 he lectured at the Oslo School of Architecture and Design. He was appointed professor at the Norwegian National Academy of Fine Arts in 1980, and served as rector of the institution from 1983 to 1984.

His public works include La hundre blomster blomstre (1973, in collaboration with ceramist Karin Eie Guttormsgaard), Labyrinten (1989–1993) at the University of Tromsø, and Havet og livshistorien for the Seville Expo '92. He is represented with works in the National Gallery of Norway, Riksgalleriet, Bergen Billedgalleri, Trondheim Art Museum, Stavanger kunstmuseum, and other galleries. He illustrated several books, and was awarded Bokkunstprisen for 2017.

In 2009 he was awarded honorary membership of the association Norske Grafikere. A collector, he acquired the old dairy in the village of Blaker in Sørum, which he used as atelier and museum, and where he arranged numerous exhibitions. His collection of more than 20,000 artifacts has been donated to a foundation, Guttormsgaards Arkiv.

Guttormsgaard died in October 2019.
