= Aslag Guttormsgaard =

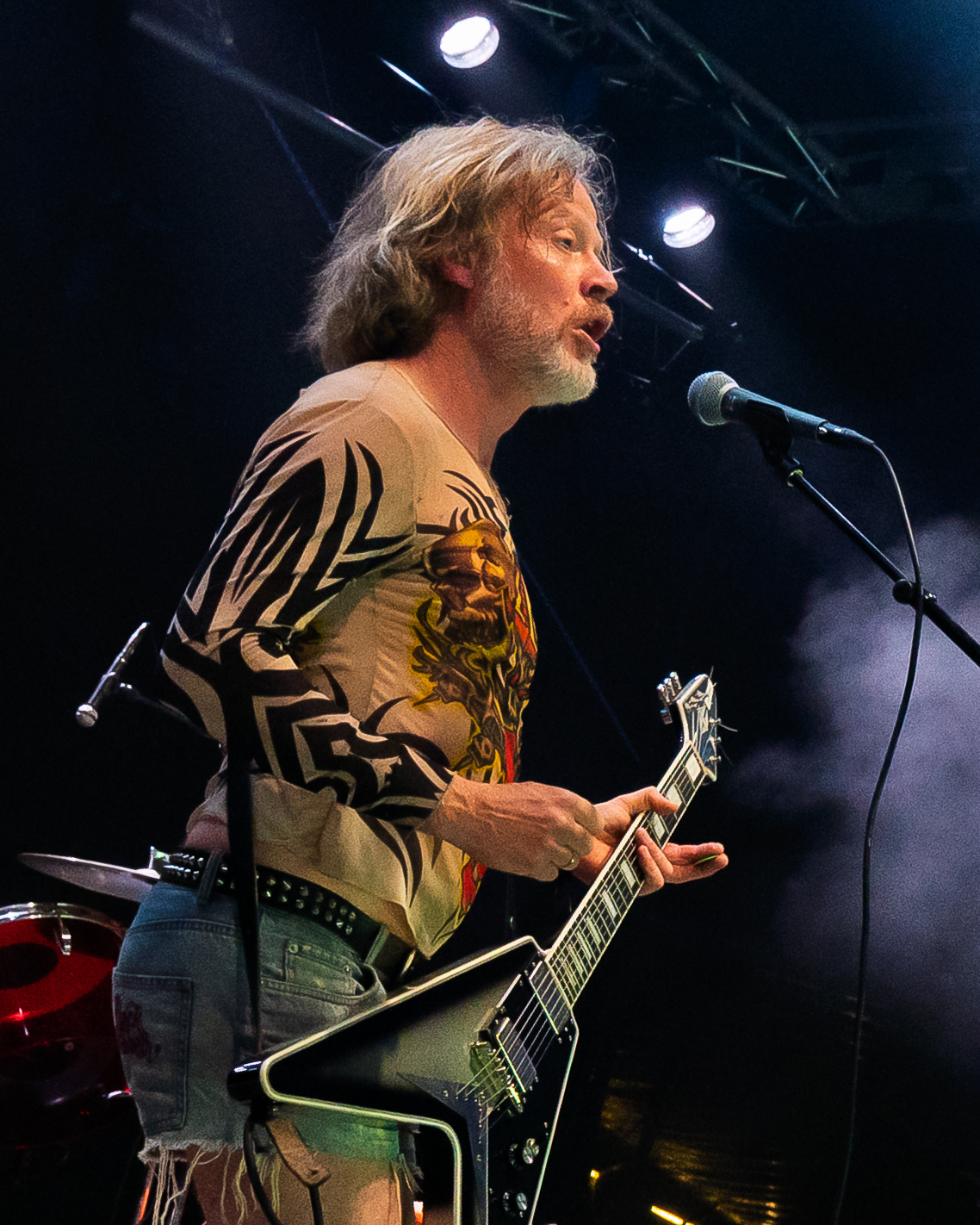

Background information
- Also known as: Jex Guttormsgaard ,
- Born: Aslag Guttormsgaard; 6 March 1969 (age 57)
- Genres: Heavy metal, doom metal, blues rock, alternative rock, comedy rock, punk rock, hard rock, stoner rock, indie rock
- Occupations: Musician, actor, screenwriter, songwriter
- Instruments: Guitars, vocals, bass, drums, percussion, kazoo, theremin, xylophone

Aslag Guttormsgaard (born 6 March 1969) is a Norwegian musician, screenwriter and actor. Together with Egil Hegerberg and Lars Lønning he is the founder of the artistic collective Duplex. His father is the artist Guttorm Guttormsgaard. Aslag is a really active man and has been involved with a numerous bands such as: Reidar Roses Orkester, Hurra Torpedo, Black Debbath, Stjerten, Aasen, LYD and The O-Men, and has also worked on various solo projects. In addition he has played several roles in Norwegian television series including the cowardly super-hero "Hønemannen" (Hen-man or Chicken-man) and the father of the main character in the film Svein og rotta (Svein and the rat). He has also performed in several TV commercials for Telenor.

Recently he has been involved in the family program "Det var en gang et eventyr" (Once Upon a Fairytale"), which is based on Norwegian folklore. With other members of the Duplex community, he also co-wrote the script for the comic Familien Ost (The Cheese Family). He was also a cast member of the long running Norwegian soap opera Hotel Cæsar.
