= Henning Solvang =

Norwegian musician

Henning Solvang (born 1974) (Doom Perignon) is a Norwegian rock musician and member of the rock bands Thulsa Doom and Brut Boogaloo. Henning is now a teacher at "Hauketo skole" in Oslo, Norway, teaching history, geography and music. He is well known in the Norwegian rock community. He has been a member of several rockbands since 2001, and has been a collaborator on 12 albums with several bands. Henning has played in the well known Øyafestivalen in Norway in 2008. He got good reviews from NRK (National broadcasting network in Norway) when playing with Brut Boogaloo for their new album Dirty Living. During the Norwegian music contest, Melodi Grand Prix the competition that decides which person or band who will be nominated for Eurovision Song Contest, Henning was a member of the national jury with 50% power to decide, along with the votes of the country.

His song "Learn from TV" has been used in the television series Mammon.

== Discography ==
Album	Year	Band name
The Seats Are Soft But The Helmet Is Way Too Tight	2001	Thulsa Doom
Do the Boogaloo	2001	Brut Boogaloo
Oslo City	2002	Mensen
The Caliban Sessions #1	2002	The Caliban Sessions
The Caliban Sessions #2	2002	The Caliban Sessions
Norwegian Jesus	2003	The Cumshots
... And then Take You to a Place Where Jars Are Kept	2003	Thulsa Doom
Keyboard, Oh Lord! Why Don't We?	2005	Thulsa Doom
Need the Air	2005	Thulsa Doom
Dirty Living	2008	Brut Boogaloo
Simple Pleasures	2010	Bloodlights
El Doom	2012	El Doom and The Born Electric
