= Thulsa Doom (band) =

Norwegian band

- Origin: Oslo, Norway
- Genres: Stoner rock, hard rock, doom metal
- Years active: 1999–2006, 2013–
- Labels: This Dark Reign; Big Dipper
- Members: Henning Solvang; Ole Petter Andreassen; Egil Hegerberg; Halvor Winsnes; Jacob Krogvold
- Website: http://www.duplexrecords.no/band/thulsa-doom/

Thulsa Doom is a Norwegian heavy metal band. It takes its name from the Robert E. Howard character. This is not to be mistaken for the New York crust punk band with the same name that existed from 1998 to 2000.

== History ==
The band was formed in 1999 by guitarist Ole Petter Andreassen (also a member of the Cumshots and Black Debbath), under the stage name El Doom. He was joined by his Black Debbath colleague, bass player Egil Hegerberg, using the name Angelov Doom, as well as singer Papa Doom, guitarist Doom Perignon and drummer Fast Winston Doom.

The band's music is somewhat similar to stoner rock legends Kyuss and early Black Sabbath. The band's debut release She Fucks Me was released in 2000. The five-track EP has a picture of Bill Clinton on the cover. Thulsa Doom have since released five full-length albums. One of their trademarks is very long and strange album titles. An example of this extended album title length can be found on the 2003 full-length album release ...And Then Take You to a Place Where Jars Are Kept which notably was nominated for a Spellemannprisen award, also known as the Norwegian Grammy in English, in the Rock category.

Singer Papa Doom left the band in 2003, and guitarist Doom Perignon is now the band's singer. The band's 2005 album Keyboard, Oh Lord! Why Don't We? is a bit less heavy and more melodic than the previous albums. Their cover version of Beach Boys' "Tears in the Morning" was a minor TV hit in Norway in the summer of 2005 with a video directed by Jarle Medhus.

== Members ==
- Papa Doom (Jacob Krogvold) – lead vocals (1999–2003 2013–)
- Doom Perignon (Henning Solvang) – guitar, lead vocals (2003-2013)
- El Doom (Ole Petter Andreassen) – guitar, vocals
- Angelov Doom (Egil Hegerberg) – bass, keyboards, vocals
- Fast Winston Doom (Halvor Winsnes) – drums

== Discography ==
=== Albums ===
- The Seats are Soft But the Helmet Is Way Too Tight (2001)
- ...And Then Take You to a Place Where Jars are Kept (2003)
- Keyboard, Oh Lord! Why Don't We? (2005)
- A Keen Eye for the Obvious (2017)
- Ambition Freedom (2021)

=== EPs ===
- She Fucks Me (EP) (2000)

== Singles ==
- "City of People" / "Sleep With Celebrity" (2001)
