= Black Debbath =

Norwegian hard rock/metal band

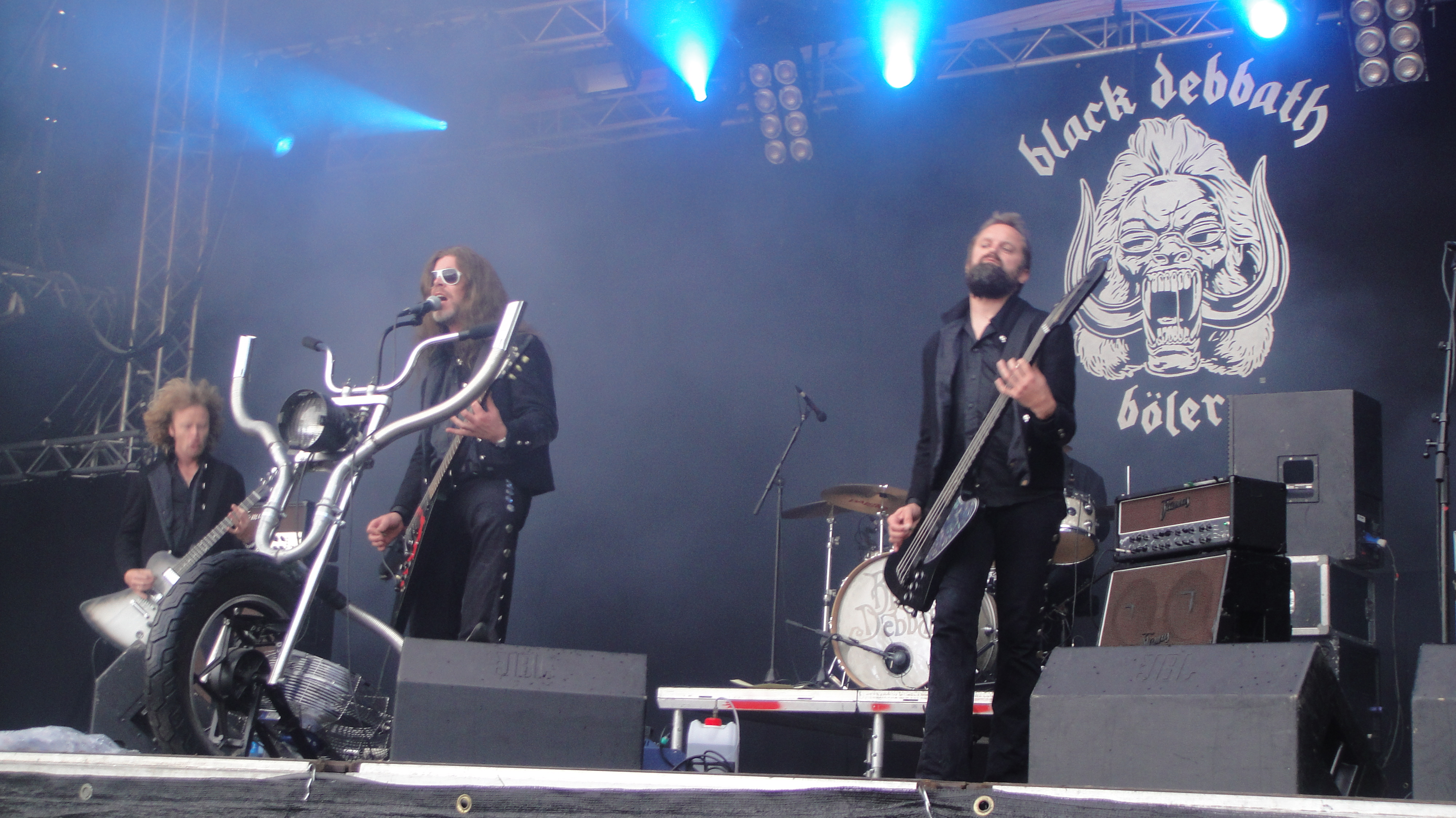

Background information
- Origin: Oslo, Norway
- Genres: Comedy rock, heavy metal, hard rock, doom metal, stoner rock, blues rock
- Years active: 1998–present
- Label: Duplex Records
- Members: Egil Hegerberg; Lars Lønning; Aslag Guttormsgaard; Ole Petter Andreassen
- Website: www.blackdebbath.com

Black Debbath is a Norwegian hard rock/metal band created by four of the core members of Duplex Records. They often make a political statement, calling their genre "Heavy Politically Incorrect Humor Rock".

== Members ==
- Egil Hegerberg – bass, guitar, synth, keyboard, vocals
- Lars Lønning – vocals, guitar
- Aslag Guttormsgaard – guitar, bass, vocals
- Ole Petter Andreassen – drums, vocals

== Session members ==
- Per Berdtrand Aanonsen, drums (1999). Played drums on most of the first album.
- Ronni Le Tekrø, guitar (2018). Guest guitarist on the song "Tons of Rock".

== Discography ==
=== Studio albums ===
- Tung, tung politisk rock (1999)
- Welcome to Norway (2001)
- Den femte statsmakt (2004)
- Naar vi døde rocker (en tungrockhyllest til Ibsen) (2006)
- Black Debbath hyller kvinnen! (2007)
- Nå får det faen meg være rock! Akademisk stoner-rock! (2013)
- Universell Riffsynsing (2015)
- Norsk barsk metal (2018)
- Age of Kørka (2022)

=== Singles ===
- "Problemer innad i Høyre" (1999)
- "Mongo Norway (a guide to nightlife in Oslo)" (2001)
- "Martin Schanke" (2001)
- "Den femte statsmakt" (2004)
- "Motörhedda Gabler" (2006)
- "Striden om Ibsens møblement" (2006)
- "Nei til runkesti på Ekeberg" (2013)
- "Bytt kjøkkenklut oftere" (2013)
- "Pensjonsballade" (2015)
- "Kompetansesentra for rytmisk musikk og rock (demo)" (2016)
- "Klein Kaffe" (2016)
- "1001-1002-1003" (2016)
- "PILS!" (2018)
