= Egil Hegerberg =

Norwegian comedian and musician (born 1970)

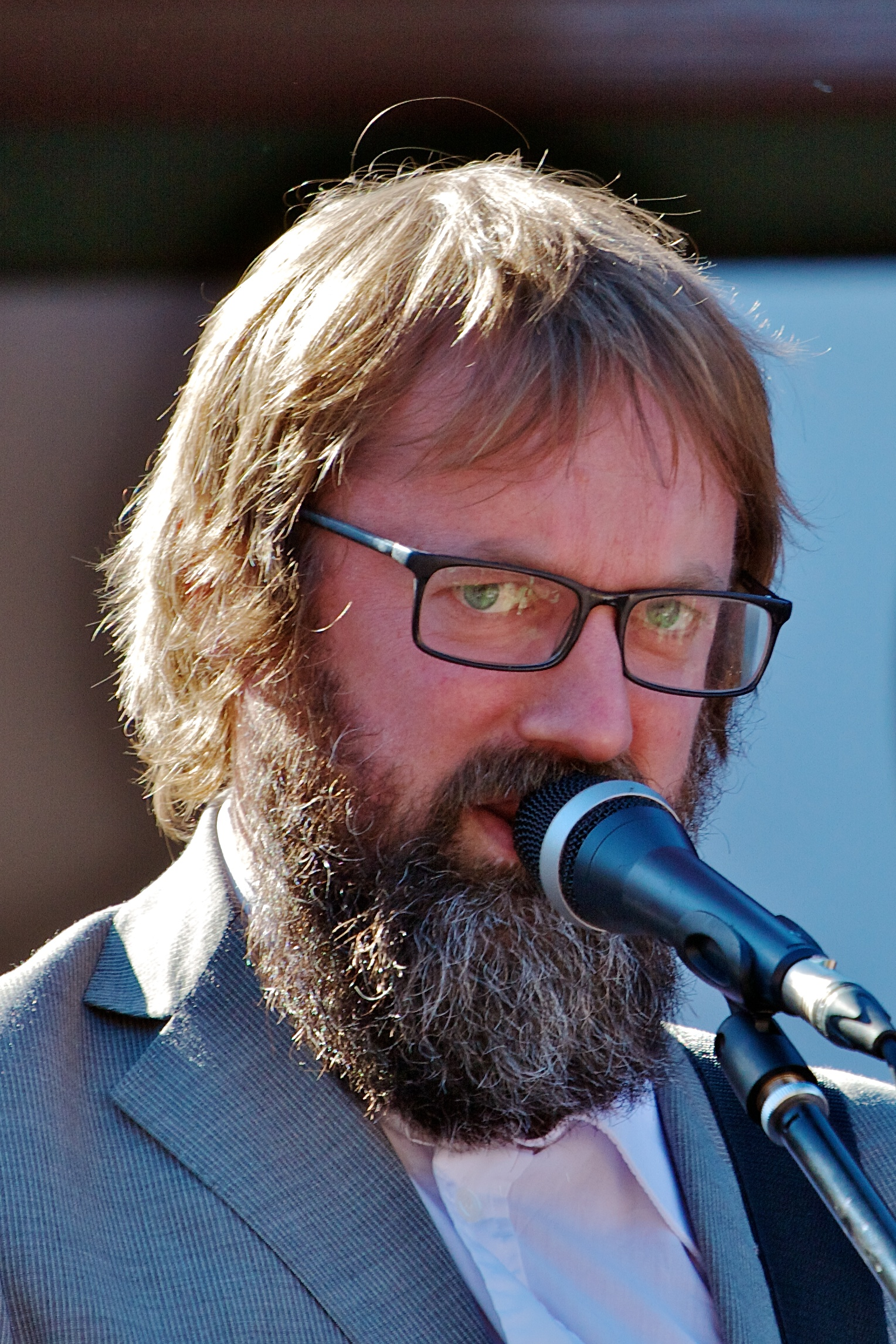
- Egil Hegerberg (2012)

Background information
- Also known as: Bare Egil, Angelov Doom
- Born: Egil Hegerberg; 23 March 1970 (age 56)
- Origin: Oslo, Norway
- Genres: heavy metal, hard rock, blues rock, stoner rock, alternative rock, hip hop, acoustic rock, doom metal, comedy rock, punk rock, reggae
- Occupations: musician, entertainer, comedian, songwriter
- Instruments: Vocals, bass, guitar, keyboard, synth
- Website: http://www.bareegilband.no

Egil Hegerberg (born 23 March 1970) is a Norwegian comedian and musician known for his humorous lyrics and behavior.

== Career ==
He is best known as a bassist and vocalist, but also plays the guitar, keyboard and synth. He has experimented in several different genres such as punk rock, heavy metal, hard rock, stoner rock, acoustic rock, blues, noise rock, reggae and hip hop. He has played in numerous bands. Much of his notable work has been the result of his solo project Bare Egil Band, and bands like Thulsa Doom, Black Debbath, Hurra Torpedo, and Gartnerlosjen. Thulsa Doom is the only non-humorous band he has been involved with.

Black Debbath stole the Spellemannprisen award for best metal album from The Kovenant in 1999 as a joke in collaboration with Kristopher Schau, their friend, who presented the award. Afterward, in his thanking speech, Hegerberg said, "Where is Satan when you need him the most?".

Performing as a one-man entity, Hegerberg has released seven albums as Bare Egil Band (Only Egil Band). The first of these, "Absolutt ikke Bare Egil Band", was released in 1996 and became a huge cult hit. It took him however 11 years before releasing the follow-up album "Det noe svakere andrealbumet" ("The Slightly Poorer Second Album"), which released in March 2008, including "Iskrem" (Ice cream), a song begging the Minister of Finance to not spend the entire national budget on ice cream. Another hit from this album was "Gulost i doss", a seldom-seen social commentary from the erstwhile humorous lyricist.

While the second album took 11 years to release, the third followed swiftly. In August 2008 Hegerberg promptly released the album "Jeg er helt rå" (I am amazing). It features the song "'N Narcissius, 'n Loke, 'n Orfeus og n' je", which explores the many inherent myths of Greek and Nordic mythology in the social and political setting of post-consumerist Norwegian society. The lyrics are written in Trondheim dialect.

He lives in Bøler, Oslo.
