= The Cumshots =

- Origin: Norway
- Genres: Heavy metal, death 'n' roll, stoner rock
- Years active: 1999–2012
- Label: Big Dipper Records

The Cumshots were a death 'n' roll band from Norway. The band was formed in 1999 by Kristopher Schau and Ole Petter Andreassen. The band released four albums, and were known for their violent live performances where members of the band regularly suffered fractures and lacerations, as seen on the cover of Norwegian Jesus. One concert featured an on-stage sex act between two members of the 'eco-porn' action group Fuck for Forest.

In 2002, the band won an unofficial world-championship in rock for bands which had only released one album in Bilbao, Spain.

== Personnel ==
=== Current members ===
- Kristopher Schau, a.k.a. "Max Cargo" - lead vocals (also in The Dogs, Datsun, Caliban Allstars, Hurra Torpedo, Gartnerlosjen, Reidar Roses Orkester, Iron Metal Hat, Sinsen, Penis Inferno, Mongo Ninja, The Dogs, White Urine)
- Ole Petter Andreassen, a.k.a. "El Doom" - guitar, vocals (Also in The Hillstone Halos, Black Debbath, Thulsa Doom, Stjerten, Caliban sessions, Caliban Allstars, Madam Psjit, Young Fogertys)
- Fredrik Gretland, a.k.a. "Freddie Tennessee" - guitar (also in Datsun, Warship)
- Tommy Reite, a.k.a. "Tommy Dean" - bass (also in The Hillstone Halos, Warship, Stjerten, Ikke Bare Egil Band, Caliban sessions, Krohn&co, the Dogs, El Cuero)
- Christian Svendsen, a.k.a. "Chris Bartender" - drums (also in Bigmuff68, Tsjuder, Grimfist, Gothminister, Tyrann, Don Haywire, Krohn&co, Blackcomedy)

=== Former/guest members ===
- Rodrigues Morales - drums
- Tommy Hjelm, "Tom Schlong" - guitar, vocals (two first albums) also in Caliban sessions, Insense, Grimfist, Big Muff 68, Infidels Forever, Beaten to Death
- Henning Solvang - guest vocals on "Norwegian Jesus". also in Thulsa Doom
- Inge Svege - harmonica on Last Sons of Evil. also in The Hillstone Halos
- Ronni Le Tekrø - guest guitar on "Turn or Burn"

== Discography ==
=== Albums ===
- Last Sons of Evil (2001, This Dark Reign USA) Duplex Records
- Norwegian Jesus (2003, Big Dipper Records)
- Just Quit Trying (2006, Big Dipper Records)
- A Life Less Necessary (2009, Rodeostar Records)

=== DVDs ===
- To Hell We Will Be Damned (2006)
