= Skavlan =

Norwegian-Swedish talk show

- Presented by: Fredrik Skavlan
- Countries of origin: Sweden, Norway
- Original languages: Norwegian, Swedish, English
- No. of seasons: 23 seasons

Production
- Executive producer: Marianne Torp-Kierulf
- Production locations: Stockholm (SVT), Oslo (NRK), London (BBC, ITV, Sky), New York
- Running time: 58 min.
- Production companies: SVT (seasons 1–3); NRK (seasons 2–3); Monkberry (seasons 4–23)

Original release
- Network: SVT
- Release: 16 January 2009 – 3 December 2021
- Network: NRK
- Release: 17 January 2009 – 3 December 2021

Related
- Først & sist (NRK, 1998–2007)

Skavlan was a Norwegian-Swedish television talk show hosted by Norwegian journalist Fredrik Skavlan. It premiered in Sweden on Sveriges Television (SVT) in January 2009, and the first guests to appear on the show were former Prime Minister of Sweden Göran Persson and his wife Anitra Steen. On 8 May 2009, it was announced that Skavlan had been renewed for a second season. It was also announced that the show would no longer only be produced by SVT in Sweden; Skavlan would now be partly produced in Norway by the Norwegian Broadcasting Corporation (NRK). The first twelve episodes of Skavlan's second season were produced by SVT in Sweden, and the remaining twelve by NRK in Norway. It was then produced by Monkberry, who took over production duties from the 4th season, run by presenter Fredrik Skavlan and producer Marianne Torp-Kierulf.

The programme was filmed at TV-huset (sv), SVT's studio complex in Stockholm, with episodes also filmed at Sky Studios in London, and Chelsea Studios in New York. London episodes were previously filmed at BBC Television Centre and ITV's London Studios.

== History ==
Skavlan was one of Europe's largest and longest running talk shows, offering interviews with some of the world's best-known personalities. Airing during prime time on Friday evenings, Skavlan was produced by Monkberry for Norwegian NRK and Swedish SVT. The show had an audience market share of 50% in Norway and 40% in Sweden with 2.5 to 3 million viewers per show. The show also aired in Finland and had a large Internet following. To date, some of Fredrik's guests have included:

- Adele
- Zara Larsson
- Bill Gates
- Nicole Kidman
- Rihanna
- Woody Allen
- Robbie Williams
- Uma Thurman
- Taylor Swift
- Bob Geldof
- Steven Van Zandt
- Isabella Rossellini
- Pamela Anderson
- Noel Gallagher
- Bill Clinton
- Emmylou Harris
- Robin Gibb
- Wyclef Jean
- Kofi Annan
- Cat Stevens
- Desmond Tutu
- Julio Iglesias
- Lars Ulrich
- Jeff Koons
- Paul Auster
- Jonathan Franzen
- Lena Olin
- PJ Harvey
- Tom Jones
- Eddie Izzard
- Malala Yousafzai
- Boris Becker
- Juliette Lewis
- Michael Palin
- Slash
- Amy Winehouse
- Florence and the Machine
- Liv Ullmann
- Susanne Sundfør
- Al Gore
- Mary L. Trump
- David Guetta
- Daniel Kahneman
- Leonard Cohen
- Richard Dawkins
- Joe Cocker
- Garry Kasparov
- The Killers
- Ronan Keating
- Jay-Z
- Dua Lipa
- Josh Groban
- Kylie Minogue
- John Irving
- Paulo Coelho
- Ben Kingsley
- Jon Bon Jovi
- Pelé
- Tove Lo
- Vince Vaughn
- Bruno Mars
- Lena Dunham
- Rosanne Cash
- Marianne Faithfull
- Joss Stone
- Natascha Kampusch
- Amos Oz
- Justin Bieber
- Dolph Lundgren
- Paul Krugman
- Sting
- Sarah, Duchess of York
- Elvis Costello
- Ellie Goulding
- Jamie Cullum
- John Mayer
- Nikolaj Coster-Waldau
- Mark Knopfler
- Will Smith
- James May
- Father John Misty
- Muhammad Yunus
- Sinéad O'Connor
- Bianca Jagger
- Isabel Allende
- Norah Jones
- Ken Follett
- Katie Melua
- Kat Von D
- Annie Lennox
- Mads Mikkelsen
- Malcolm Gladwell
- Jared Leto
- Emeli Sandé
- Andrea Bocelli
- Gordon Ramsay
- Bryan Ferry
- Mario Vargas Llosa
- Michael Bublé
- Steven Pinker
- Robert Plant
- David Walliams
- Shakira
- Kenneth Branagh
- Lorde
- John Legend
- Richard Ayoade
- Ian McEwan
- Tony Blair
- Helle Thorning-Schmidt
- Kevin Costner
- Juliette Binoche
- Matt Dillon
- John Cleese
- Paul McCartney
- Chrissie Hynde
- Alicia Keys
- Kathy Griffin
- Jimmie Åkesson
- Kygo
- Vegard Ylvisåker
- Bård Ylvisåker
- Tarjei Sandvik Moe
- Josefine Frida Pettersen
- PewDiePie
- Jan Böhmermann
- Alexander Rybak
- Benjamin Ingrosso
- Ann Coulter
- Jordan Peterson
- Annie Lööf
- Joan Baez
- Patti Smith
- Lewis Capaldi
- Greta Thunberg
- Ant Middleton
- David Blaine
- Armand Duplantis
- Anderson .Paak
- Dolly Parton
- Ricky Gervais
- Astrid S
- Stephen Fry
- Dave Grohl

List of episodes (in Swedish)

== Episodes ==
=== Season 1 (2009) ===
#	Guests	Air date
1	Göran Persson, Anitra Steen, Timbuktu, Kristina Lugn, Åsa Vilbäck, Ari Behn	16 January 2009
2	Lukas Moodysson, Filip Hammar, Fredrik Wikingsson, Petra Mede, Kjerstin Dellert, The Priests	23 January 2009
3	Rolf Lassgård, Helena Bergström, Gina Yashere, Hanna Hellquist, A Camp	30 January 2009
4	Lars Winnerbäck, Sarah Symonds, Gustaf Skarsgård, Tuva Novotny, Måns Zelmerlöw	6 February 2009
5	Carl Bildt, Jan Guillou, Noomi Rapace, Michael Nyqvist, Titiyo, Kajsa Bergqvist	13 February 2009
6	Ingvar Oldsberg, Mona Sahlin, Jens Stoltenberg, Carolina Klüft, Seasick Steve	20 February 2009
7	Liza Marklund, Mads Mikkelsen, Stellan Skarsgård, Alice Bah Kuhnke, Amos Oz, Tomas Ledin	27 February 2009
8	Fredrik Reinfeldt, Jan Malmsjö, Susanna Kallur, Brad Blanton, Marie Göranzon, Marie-Louise Ekman, Jonas Gardell, Lykke Li	6 March 2009

=== Season 2 (2009–10) ===
#	Guests	Air date
9	Garry Kasparov, Magnus Carlsen, Alexander Rybak, Lena Endre, Liv Ullmann, Jo Nesbø, Geir Haarde, Lars Winnerbäck	18 September 2009
10	Jay-Z, Anna Anka, Henrik Schyffert, Melody Gardot	25 September 2009
11	John Rendall, Björn Ranelid, Anne Holt, Jill Bolte Taylor, Mika	2 October 2009
12	Peter Englund, Anders Borg, Peter Jöback, Ian Halperin, Johan Norberg, Camilla Stoltenberg	9 October 2009
13	Auma Obama, Sofie Gråbøl, Kjetil Østli, Kjell Bergqvist, Bo Kaspers Orkester	16 October 2009
14	Helena Bergström, Colin Nutley, Lisa Nilsson, Bjørn Eidsvåg, Jarle Andhøy, Jon Ronson	23 October 2009
15	Princess Märtha Louise of Norway, Elisabeth Samnøy, Malin Åkerman, Vince Vaughn, Robin Söderling, Anna Bågenholm, Mads Gilbert, Kent	30 October 2009
16	Erik Hamrén, Eva Joly, Bjarte Baasland, Hanna Hellquist, Peter Wahlbeck, Sissel Kyrkjebø, Odd Nordstoga	6 November 2009
17	Ari Behn, Carola Häggkvist, Henrik Larsson, Rosanne Cash, Hans Rosling	13 November 2009
18	Hasse Alfredson, Tomas Alfredson, Kerry Max Cook, Toby Keith, Sissela Kyle, Kristopher Schau	20 November 2009
19	Terry Jones, Margot Wallström, Mats Sundin, Fredrik Lindström, Anne B. Ragde, Unni Drougge, Joakim Thåström	27 November 2009
20	Shakira, Dolph Lundgren, Bård Eker, Maria Strømme	4 December 2009
21	Nobel Peace Prize special: Will Smith, Jada Pinkett Smith, Robbie Williams, Esperanza Spalding	11 December 2009
22	Jonas Gahr Støre, Bob Corell, Jens Lapidus, Carolina Gynning, John Mayer	15 January 2010
23	Robert Gustafsson, Ebba Lindsö, Maria Lundqvist, Hege Schøyen, Rihanna	22 January 2010
24	Liza Marklund, Alain De Botton, Susan Tollefsen, Sapphire, Pernilla August, The Baseballs	29 January 2010
25	Josef Fares, Jan Fares, Efva Attling, Hank Von Helvete, Christine Koht, Evan Ratliff, Donkeyboy	5 February 2010
26	Norah Jones, Harald Eia, Didrik Solli-Tangen, Jessica Andersson, Sissel Gran, Patrick Sjöberg, Paul Curran	12 February 2010
27	Al Gore, Marit Bjørgen, Christer Sjögren, Kat Von D, Stellan Skarsgård, Thorsten Flinck	5 March 2010
28	Andrea Bocelli, Izabella Scorupco, Charlotte Kalla, Sig Hansen, Marcus Samuelsson	12 March 2010
29	Gro Harlem Brundtland, Plura Jonsson, Jens Tranum Kristensen, Haddy N'jie, Peter Silverman, Eldkvarn	19 March 2010
30	Aksel Lund Svindal, Anja Pärson, Aleksander Øverland Berg, Lars Monsen, Noomi Rapace, Ola Rapace, Steven Van Zandt, Ola Salo, The Ark	26 March 2010
31	Cheryl Cole, Sarah, Duchess of York, Magnus Härenstam, Bård Tufte Johansen, Thomas Hylland Eriksen	9 April 2010
32	Robyn, Arnfinn Haram, Birgitta Stenberg, John Cleese, Natascha Illum Berg	16 April 2010

=== Season 3 (2010–11) ===
#	Guests	Air date
33	Arne Treholt, Mona Sahlin, Robert Aschberg, Anne Holt, Erica Jong, Christel Alsos	24 September 2010
34	Kikki Danielsson, Tuva Novotny, Clarence Crafoord, Wille Crafoord, Cédric Villani, Bjørn Kjos, Hindi Zahra	1 October 2010
35	Karl Ove Knausgård, Babben Larsson, Susanne Bier, Rune "Major Valhall" Wenneberg, Stefan Sundström	8 October 2010
36	Tina Nordström, Sven Nordin, Torhild Strand, Leif GW Persson, Ahmed Ahmed, Robert Plant	15 October 2010
37	Hans Erik Dyvik Husby, CajsaStina Åkerström, Håkan Hellström, Anne-Kat. Hærland, Jack Vreeswijk, Julian Treasure	22 October 2010
38	The Axis of Awesome, Tom Jones, Josephine Bornebusch, Felix Herngren, Kjetil Klungland, Amelia Adamo	29 October 2010
39	Carl I. Hagen, Eli Hagen, Slash, John Nettles, Eva Dahlgren, Andy Casagrande	5 November 2010
40	Sissel Kyrkjebø, Carola Häggkvist, Cecilia Brækhus, Rubin Carter, Märta Tikkanen, Ola Rapace	12 November 2010
41	Holly Hunter, Lill-Babs, Petter, Eyvind Hellstrøm, Jan Eliasson, Ida Maria	19 November 2010
42	Lasse Åberg, Jon Skolmen, Robbie Williams, Gary Barlow, Barbara Ehrenreich, Nando Parrado, Take That	26 November 2010
43	Hermann Lindquist, Henrik Schyffert, Fredrik Lindström, Linn Skåber, Raine Gustafsson, Molly Nutley, Marina & The Diamonds	3 December 2010
44	Liv Ullmann, Mario Vargas Llosa, Theresa Alshammar, Sverker Sörlin, Josh Groban, Harlem Gospel Choir,	10 December 2010 (Norway); 17 December 2010 (Sweden)
45	Jens Stoltenberg, Harald Eia, Elisabeth Höglund, Börje Ahlstedt, Eva Gabrielsson	14 January 2011
46	Joakim Larsson, Hanne-Vibeke Holst, Alex Schulman, Bjørn Eidsvåg, Duffy	21 January 2011
47	Janne Josefsson, Pernille Sørensen, Malena Ernman, Pär Johansson, Kaizers Orchestra	4 February 2011
48	Robin Gibb, Carola Häggkvist, Bjørn Dæhlie, Philip Boit, Thomas Bodström, Inga-Britt Ahlenius	11 February 2011
49	Stella Mwangi, Andrè Pops, Sven Bertil Taube, Bodil Malmsten, Andreas Kleerup, Me and My Army	18 February 2011
50	Ingemar Stenmark, Per Heimly, Ari Behn, Bert Sundström, Omer Bhatti, Genevieve Jackson	25 February 2011
51	Natascha Kampusch, Kenny Bräck, Ane Dahl Torp, Dave Grohl, Foo Fighters	4 March 2011
52	Petter Northug, Fredrik Reinfeldt, Erna Solberg, Scott Flansburg, Sir Ken Robinson, Nina Persson	11 March 2011
53	Jo Nesbø, Anne Sofie von Otter, Karen Armstrong, Mari Boine, The Dudesons	18 March 2011
54	Ingvar Oldsberg, Christina Vukicevic, Petar Vukicevic, Bob Geldof, Maiko Nishino	25 March 2011
55	Morten Harket, Arja Saijonmaa, David Garrett, Lykke Li, Yusuf Islam	1 April 2011

=== Season 4 (2011–12) ===
#	Guests	Air date
56	Benny Andersson, Ludvig Andersson, My Skarsgård, Iben Hjejle, Rolf Lassgård, Geir Lippestad, Atlas	16 September 2011
57	Kevin Costner, Annika Östberg, Jonathan Franzen, Else Kåss Furuseth, Modern West	23 September 2011
58	Magnus Uggla, Therese Johaug, Maud Olofsson, Odd Nerdrum, Gregory David Roberts, Maria Mena	30 September 2011
59	Noomi Rapace, Carl Bildt, Edvard Moser, May-Britt Moser, Tony Bennett	7 October 2011
60	Noel Gallagher, Magnus Carlsen, Irshad Manji, Percy Barnevik	14 October 2011
61	Egil Olsen, Erik Hamrén, Lena Philipsson, Ann Heberlein, Robert Stoltenberg, PJ Harvey	21 October 2011
62	Jens Stoltenberg, Stina Lundberg Dabrowski, Suzann Pettersen, Tor Bomann-Larsen, Anna Ternheim	28 October 2011
63	Hans Rosling, Kristin Skogen Lund, Marcus Birro, Peter Birro, Linnea Schibbye, David Guetta, Florence and the Machine	4 November 2011
64	Emil Johansen, Melissa Horn, Bjørn Ferry, Tarjei Bø, Ryan Adams, Anna Mannheimer, Peter Apelgren	11 November 2011
65	Krister Henriksson, Erik Sønstelie, Siri Marie Seim Sønstelie, Riz Khan, Marit Larsen	18 November 2011
66	Björn Gustafsson, Espen Eckbo, Jan Carlzon, Anna Maria Corazza Bildt, Michael Bublé	25 November 2011
67	Linn Ullmann, Håkan Juholt, Charlotte Perrelli, Victor Muller, Ane Brun	2 December 2011
68	Felicia Feldt, Bård Tufte Johansen, Harald Eia, Horace Engdahl, Anton Corbijn, Louise Hoffsten	13 January 2012
69	Michael Nyqvist, Knut Arild Hareide, Mark Levengood, Rebecca Jane, Emeli Sandé	20 January 2012
70	Laleh, Birgith Røkkum Skarstein, Björn Ranelid, Thorsten Flinck, Roberto Saviano	27 January 2012
71	Anders Lettström, Steinar Sagen, Tore Sagen, First Aid Kit, Christian Ringnes, Michael Kiwanuka	3 February 2012
72	Mona Sahlin, Jonas Gahr Støre, John Gray, Timbuktu	10 February 2012
73	Eva Joly, Babben, Pelle Sandstrak, Richard Wiseman, Ebbot Lundberg, The Soundtrack Of Our Lives	17 February 2012
74	Tooji Keshtkar, Amelie von Zweigberk, Irene Wennemo, Claes Elfsberg, Alicia Vikander, Tone Damli	24 February 2012
75	Daniel Ek, Mia Gundersen, Sir Ben Kingsley, Lone Frank, Donkeyboy	2 March 2012
76	Kristin Halvorsen, Lasse Kjus, Kjetil André Aamodt, Per Morberg, Lionel Richie, Jill Johnson	9 March 2012
77	Steven Pinker, Katarina Hultling, Maria Montazami, Caitlin Moran, Are Kalvø, Frida Hyvönen	16 March 2012
78	Inger Nilsson, Per-Kristian Foss, Anja Paerson, Kate McCann, Gerry McCann	23 March 2012
79	Marie Göranzon, Alexander Dale Oen, Göran Rosenberg, Vanna Rosenberg, James Frey, Howlin' Pelle Almqvist, The Hives	30 March 2012

=== Season 5 (2012–13) ===
#	Guests	Air date
80	Björn Ulvaeus, Ulrika Jonsson, Vilde Frang, Brandon Flowers, Richard Dawkins, The Killers	7 September 2012
81	Anton Hysén, Glenn Hysén, Øystein Stray Spetalen, Margot Wallström, E. L. James, Muse	14 September 2012
82	Joakim Palme, Mårten Palme, Mattias Palme, Thomas Seltzer, Lena Olin, Jennifer Thompson, Ronald Cotton, Moa	21 September 2012
83	Cecilia Brækhus, Bjarne Melgaard, Eddie Izzard, Alicia Keys, John Guidetti	28 September 2012
84	Espen Barth Eide, Birgitte Hjort Sørensen, Fredrik Eklund, Robert Dam, Elisabeth Höglund, Susanne Sundfør	5 October 2012
85	Anne Holt, Alexander Rybak, Ulf Lundell, Camilla Hedemark	12 October 2012
86	Liv Signe Navarsete, Leif GW Persson, Malin Persson Giolito, Lise Fjeldstad, Yohio, Mando Diao	19 October 2012
87	Wenche Myhre, Amanda Jenssen, Ola Rapace, John Irving, Kerry Kennedy, Christopher McDougall	26 October 2012
88	Karl Ove Knausgård, Robbie Williams, Dawn French, Jon Bon Jovi, Martin Kellerman	2 November 2012
89	Freddie Ljungberg, Erik Solheim, Elizabeth McGovern, Taylor Swift	9 November 2012
90	Gina Dirawi, Vigdis Hjort, Ruby Wax, Jeffrey Gedmin, Chris Horrie	16 November 2012
91	Thorvald Stoltenberg, Masha Gessen, Swedish House Mafia, Bruno Mars	23 November 2012
92	Birgit Skarstein, Petter Stordalen, Ewa Fröling, Vamp	18 January 2013
93	Lena Endre, Bjørn Kjos, Anna Kjos, Jörn Donner, Steven Van Zandt, Miguel	25 January 2013
94	Jon Michelet, Anna Wahlgren, Judit Polgar, Alexander Stubb, Imagine Dragons	1 February 2013
95	Petra Mede, Kåre Willoch, Ulf Ellervik, Paul Auster, Siri Hustvedt, Petter Askergren	8 February 2013
96	Wyclef Jean, Hadia Tajik, Peggy Steffans-Sarno, The Jacksons	15 February 2013
97	Herborg Kråkevik, Stein Winge, Lotta Schelin, Mauro Scocco, Plura, Louis Ferrante	22 February 2013
98	Britt Ekland, Ian McEwan, Dido, Daniel Kahneman, Jessica Wadsworth	1 March 2013
99	Ed Stafford, Nyamko Sabuni, Ivar Bjørnson, Sinéad O'Connor, Johan Olsson	8 March 2013
100	Mats Wilander, Dag Solstad, Sidse Babett Knudsen, Agnetha Fältskog, Loreen, Kleerup	15 March 2013
101	Anders Borg, Gro Hammerseng, Mia Skäringer, Michael Palin, The Lumineers	22 March 2013
102	Vladislav Savic, Tiril Sjåstad Christiansen, Röyksopp, Susanne Sundfør, Nikolaj Coster-Waldau, Alex Schulman, Amanda Schulman	5 April 2013

== Criticism ==
The show received criticism from leading intellectuals and some of their female guests, accusing Fredrik Skavlan of being sexist and asking impertinent questions and flirting with his female guests. Carolina Gynning told Swedish media that she found his questions "demeaning". Skavlan retaliated in an interview with the Swedish newspaper Expressen in which he said that the accusations were "absurd" and that he considered himself to be a feminist.

Skavlan encountered some criticism from Norwegian viewers for his tough interview with former Icelandic prime minister Geir Haarde.
