= Bubble football =

Recreational sport

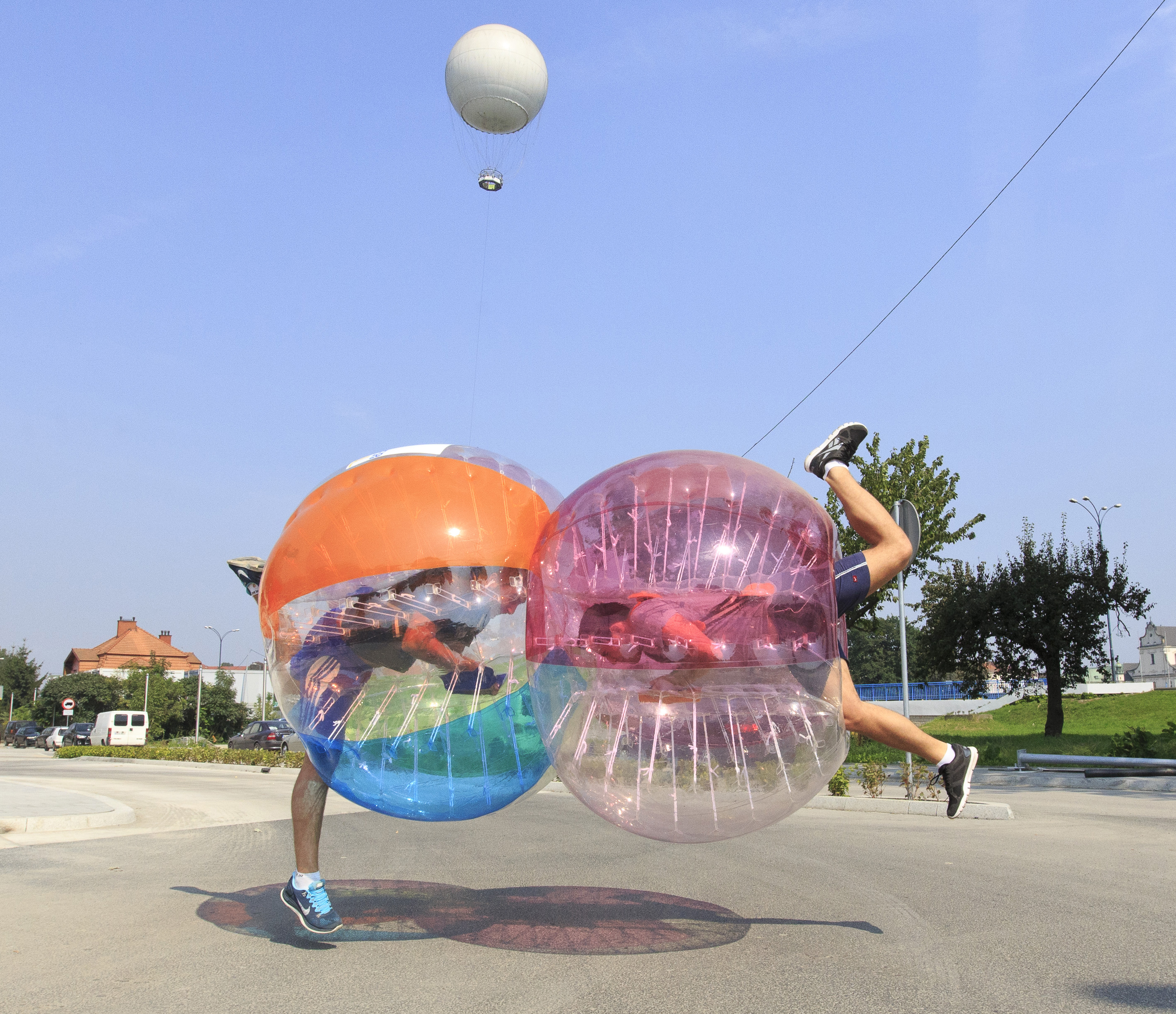
Bubble football

Bubble football, or bubble soccer, is the recreation/sport of playing soccer while half-encased inside an inflated torus bubble, similar to a zorb, which covers the player's upper body and head. This game is typically played in teams in large indoor spaces or outdoor fields. Bubble football follows the same objectives and overall rules as regular football (i.e., teams compete to hit a ball into the opposing team's goal) with the added condition that each player must wear an inflatable bubble, similar to a water ball, around their upper torso. Bubble soccer is often played at corporate team building days, stag parties, bachelor parties, and birthday parties. There are also many variations of bubble football, such as bubble bowling, bubble sumo, bubble soccer, and airball soccer.

== Origin ==
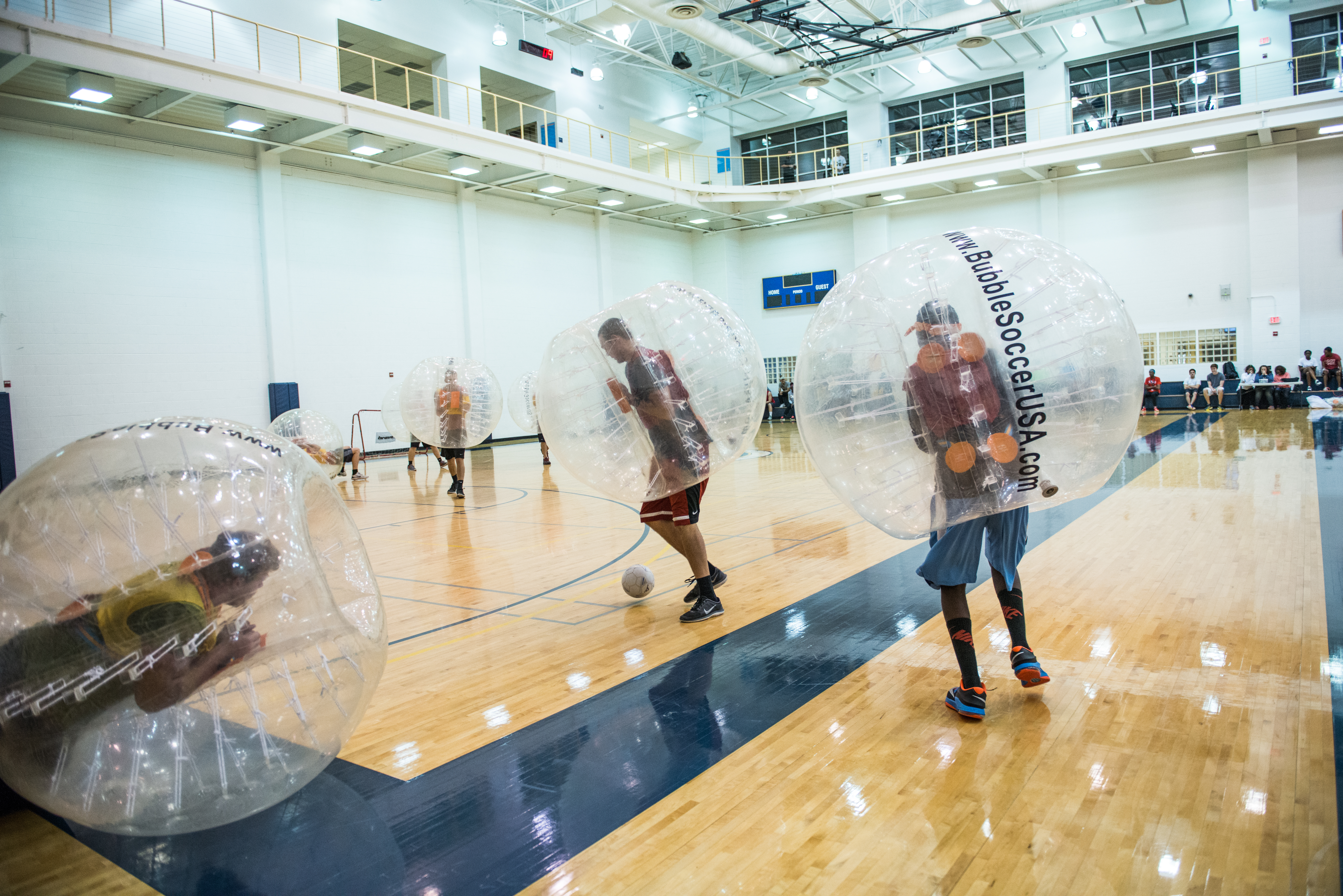
A bubble soccer match at Texas A&M University–Commerce in December 2014

Bubble football was first showcased in Norway by Henrik Elvestad and Johan Golden in 2011, when it made an appearance on their TV show, Golden Goal. The game was spread in the UK by Lee Moseley who self-financed. By 2014, the game had reached New Zealand and was launched in the US by Mahdad Taheri, Founder of Bubbleball Inc.

Now in the US it is overseen by its governing body, the BBA. The sport of BBA bubbleball was designed by Mahdad Taheri, Founder of the BBA, and was launched August 2019 in Southern California. COVID hampered development plans by several years. However on August 2, 2025, the first full match of BBA bubbleball between SDSU and UCSD students aired on ESPN: The Ocho unveiling a new form of game play and equipment.

== Shark Tank appearance ==
On November 20, 2015, bubble football appeared on the American TV show Shark Tank. John Anthony Radosta, league commissioner of the National Association of Bubble Soccer (based in the United States), appeared on the show in an attempt to secure a deal with the show's panel of investors. While ultimately unsuccessful in his pitch, the appearance generated subsequent press coverage.

== Different scenarios ==
When playing bubble football there are a number of alternative scenarios which can be played:

- Bubble bowling: A group of pins stands at one end of the pitch while another player tries to run and dive at the group in an attempt to knock as many pins over as possible.
- Bubble sumo: Two players try to push each other out of bounds, which is a circle drawn on the ground.
- Bulldog: One player (the starting bulldog) tries to knock down as many players as possible, stopping them from getting from one end of the pitch to the other. Whoever gets knocked down then also becomes a bulldog.

== Bubble Football international cup ==
In May 2018, the first ever World Cup took place in London in Shoreditch, located in the London Borough of Hackney, with the finals taking place at Wembley. Nations who attended the world cup include Finland, Brazil, Portugal, and Spain.

== See also ==
- Zorbing
- Five-a-side football
- Soap Football
- Sitting Football
