= Water ball (disambiguation) =

A water ball is a large inflatable sphere.

It may also refer to:

- Waterball, a ball thrown on water
- Water polo ball, the ball used in water polo
- Water Balz, a brand of expanding toys
- Water bead, water absorbing gel balls
