= Henrik Elvestad =

Norwegian actor and host

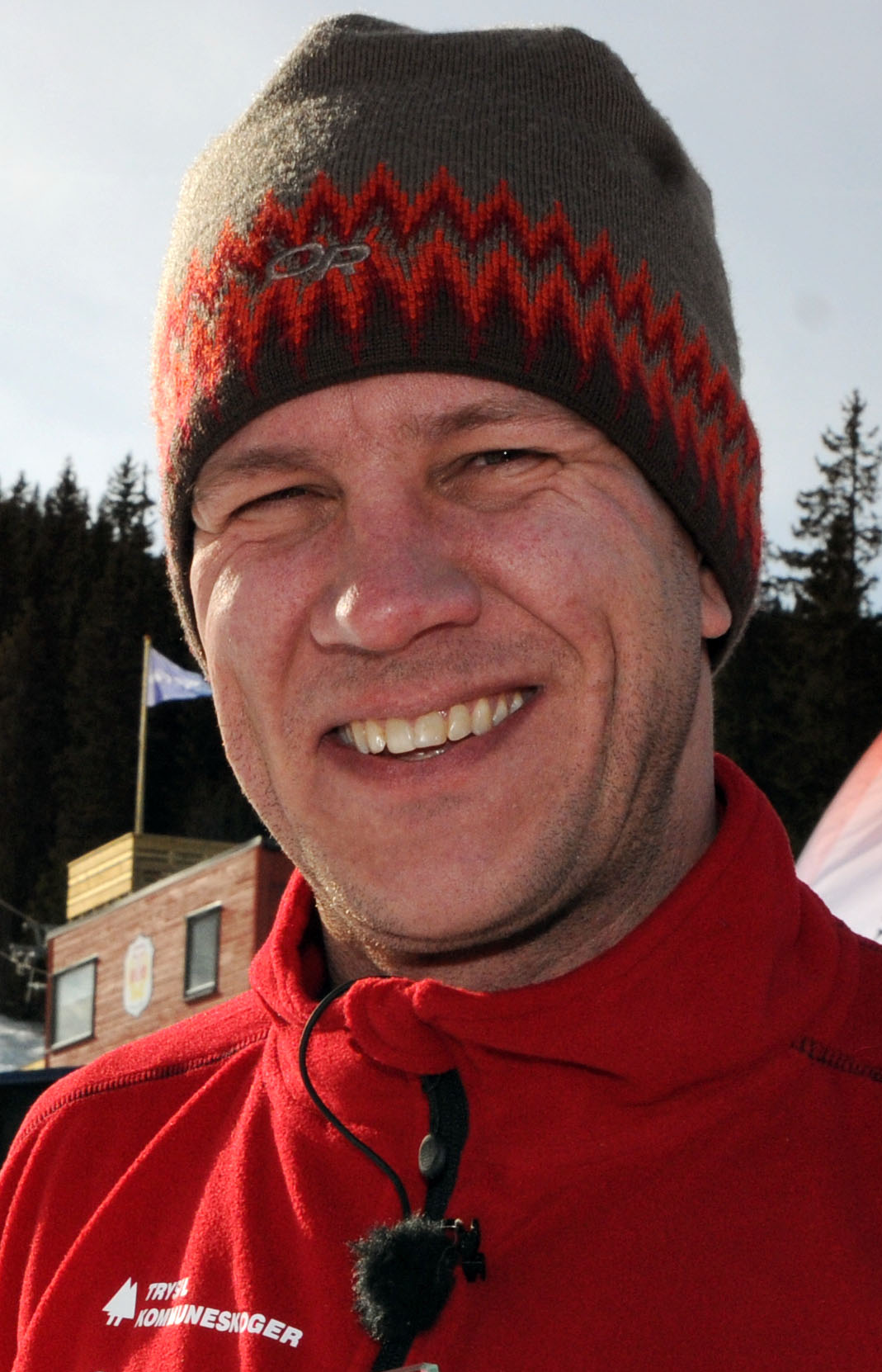

Henrik Elvestad (born 3 July 1973) is a Norwegian actor, comedian, and television presenter.

== Career ==
From 2006 to 2015, Elvestad hosted Norwegian television program Golden Goal with Johan Golden, where they invented bubble football.
