= Jon Almaas =

Norwegian TV-host and actor

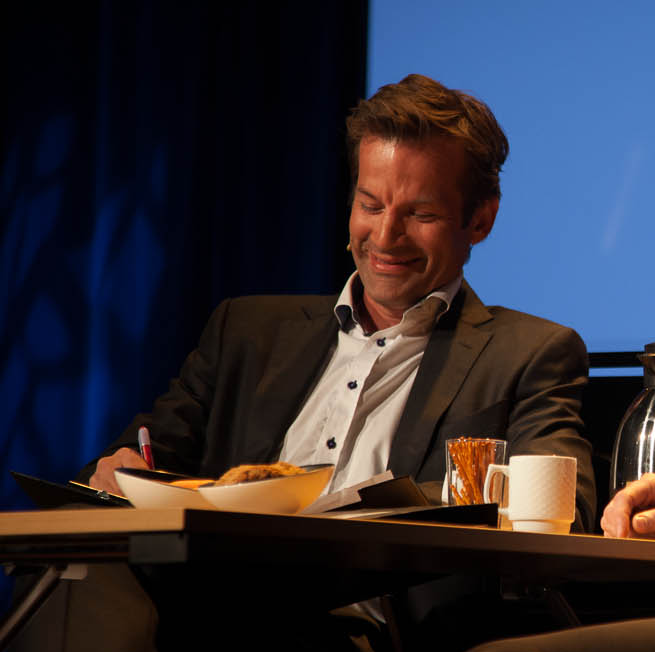
- Born: 29 August 1967 (age 58); Bærum, Norway
- Education: Oslo Waldorf School
- Known for: TV presenter and author
- Spouse: Ellen Christin Heider
- Children: 2

Jon Almaas (born 28 August 1967) is a Norwegian TV-host and actor, best known from the weekly comedy Nytt på nytt which he hosted for 17 years.

== Career ==
Almaas got his start on TV3, before moving to the NRK in 1994. Although he initially worked as a producer for the NRK, he would eventually become a household name through hosting the popular show Nytt på Nytt, the Norwegian adaptation of Have I Got News For You. Almaas hosted Nytt på Nytt from its beginning in 1999 until December 2016, when he left NRK. He was replaced by Bård Tufte Johansen, a comedian.

Almaas has also published three books, Slik blir du husets herre (English: This Is How You Become the Master of the House) (2002), Bare så du vet det (English: Just So You Know) (2004) and Den store norske TV-boka: Alt du ikke visste om norske TV-kjendiser (og litt til) (English: The Large Norwegian Television Book: Everything You Didn't Know about Norwegian Television Stars (and a Little Bit More)) (2006).

== Private life ==
Almaas is married to Ellen Christin Heider (a doctor), and they have 2 children together. His sister, Astrid Nylander Almaas, is a physician and panelist on the TV-show Hva feiler det deg? [What's wrong with you?).

== Television appearances ==
Year	Title	Network	Notes/Air Dates
1994	Penger på spill	NRK	
1996–2016	Nytt på nytt	NRK	Host
2002; 2005	Først & sist	NRK	Guest
2006	Senkveld med Thomas og Harald	TV2	Guest
2010	Himmelblå	NRK	Episode 3.7
2011	Hvem tror du at du er?	NRK	
2011	Åse Tonight	NRK	Episode: Åse går i bakken
2012	Hellstrøm inviterer	TV3	Competitor
2012	Brille	TVNorge	Panelist
2012	Lindmo	NRK	Guest
2013	70-talls-feministene	NRK	
2013–present	Side om side	NRK	51 episodes. Role: Christian Kopperud
2014–2015	Over hekken	NRK	10 episodes. Role: Christian Kopperud
2017–present	Praktisk info med Jon Almaas	TVNorge	Host
2018	Huskestue	TV2	Competitor

== Awards ==
Year	Award	Nominated work	Result	Ref.
2002	Riksmålforbundets Lytterpris	Nytt på nytt	Won	
2002	Gullruten for Best Male Television Presenter	Nytt på nytt	Won	
2003	Gullruten for Best Male Television Presenter	Nytt på nytt	Won	
2011	Gullruten for Best Male Television Presenter	Nytt på nytt	Won	

== Bibliography ==
- Slik blir du husets herre (2002), ISBN 9788248902492
- Bare så du vet det (2003), ISBN 9788248904373
- Den store norske TV-boka - alt du ikke visste om norske TV-kjendiser (og litt til) (2006), ISBN 9788248906315
