= Nytt på nytt =

Norwegian television comedy panel show

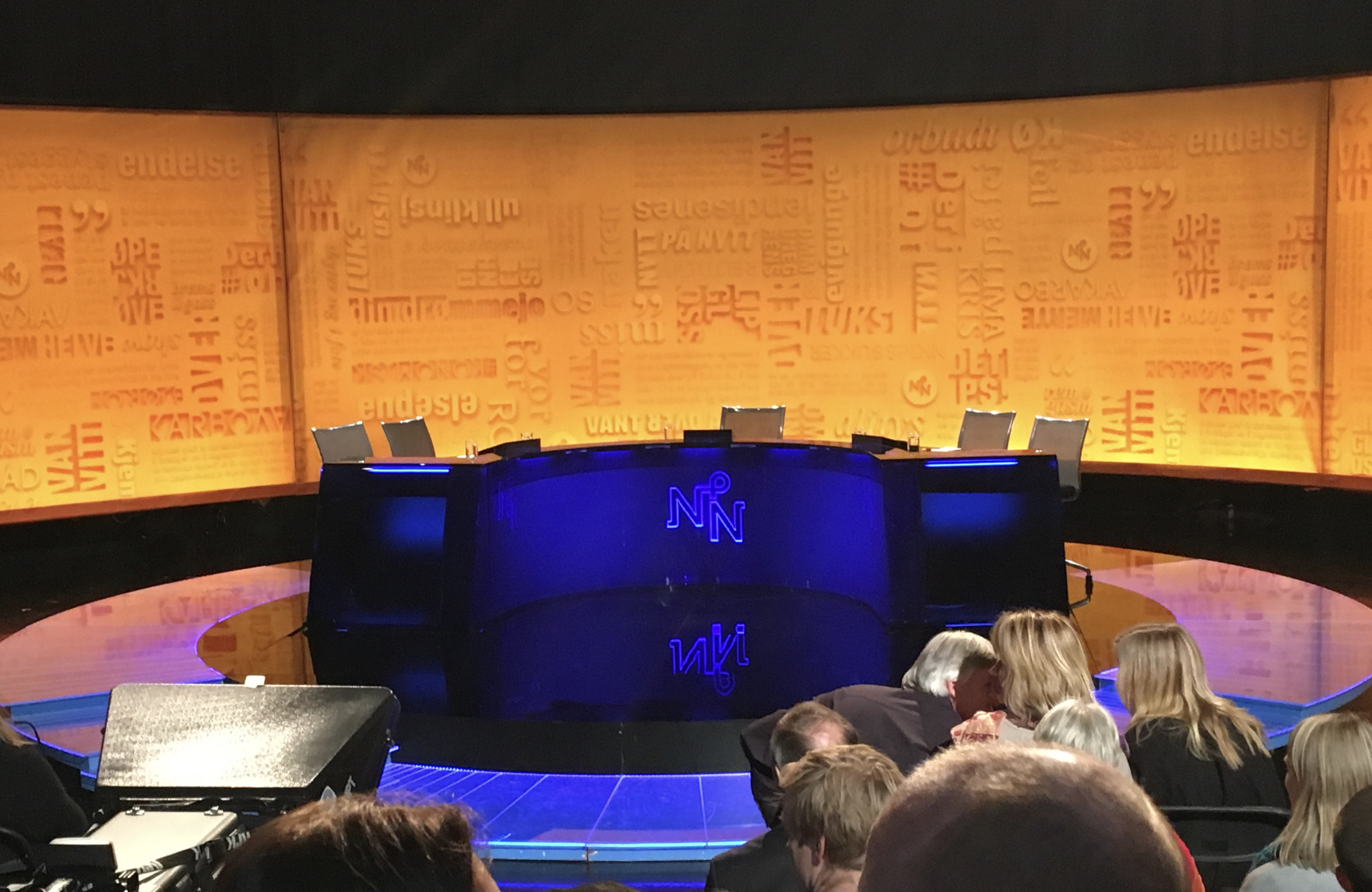
- The studio
- Genre: Satirical panel game
- Presented by: Jon Almaas (1999–2016); Bård Tufte Johansen (2017–present)
- Starring: Johan Golden (2015–present); Pernille Sørensen (2015–2023); Ingrid Gjessing Linhave (2013–2015); Linn Skåber (2007–2013); Knut Nærum (1999–2015); Anne-Kat. Hærland (1999–2007)
- Theme music composer: Javed Kurd
- Country of origin: Norway
- Original language: Norwegian
- No. of seasons: 47
- No. of episodes: 650 (25 November 2022)

Production
- Producer: NRK
- Production locations: Marienlyst, Oslo
- Running time: 30 minutes

Original release
- Network: NRK1
- Release: 9 April 1999

Related
- Uutisvuoto (FIN); Dit was het nieuws (NED); Snacka om nyheter (SWE); Have I Got News for You (GBR)

Nytt på nytt ("News Anew", literally "new on new") is a Norwegian version of the British TV comedy panel show Have I Got News for You (created by Hat Trick Productions for the BBC). The programme is a competition between a pair of two-person teams, with one permanent panellist and one guest player on each team.

The aim is for each of the teams to score points by correctly answering questions based on the week's news. In practice, however, the point-scoring element is secondary: although the final scores do get a brief mention at the end of the show, the entertainment chiefly comes from witty remarks made by the panellists and the banter that passes between them.

When the show was first launched, in the spring of 1999, Jon Almaas was the host, and the permanent panellists were Knut Nærum and Anne-Kat. Hærland. In 2016, the show began to be hosted by Bård Tufte Johansen.

The current, permanent panellists, Johan Golden and Pernille Sørensen, both started on the show in 2015.

== Regular panelists ==
- Anne-Kat. Hærland (1999–2007)
- Knut Nærum (1999–2015)
- Linn Skåber (2007–2013)
- Ingrid Gjessing Linhave (2013–2015)
- Pernille Sørensen (2015–2023)
- Johan Golden (2015–)
- Isalill Kolpus (2023–)
