= Waterballs =

Water toy

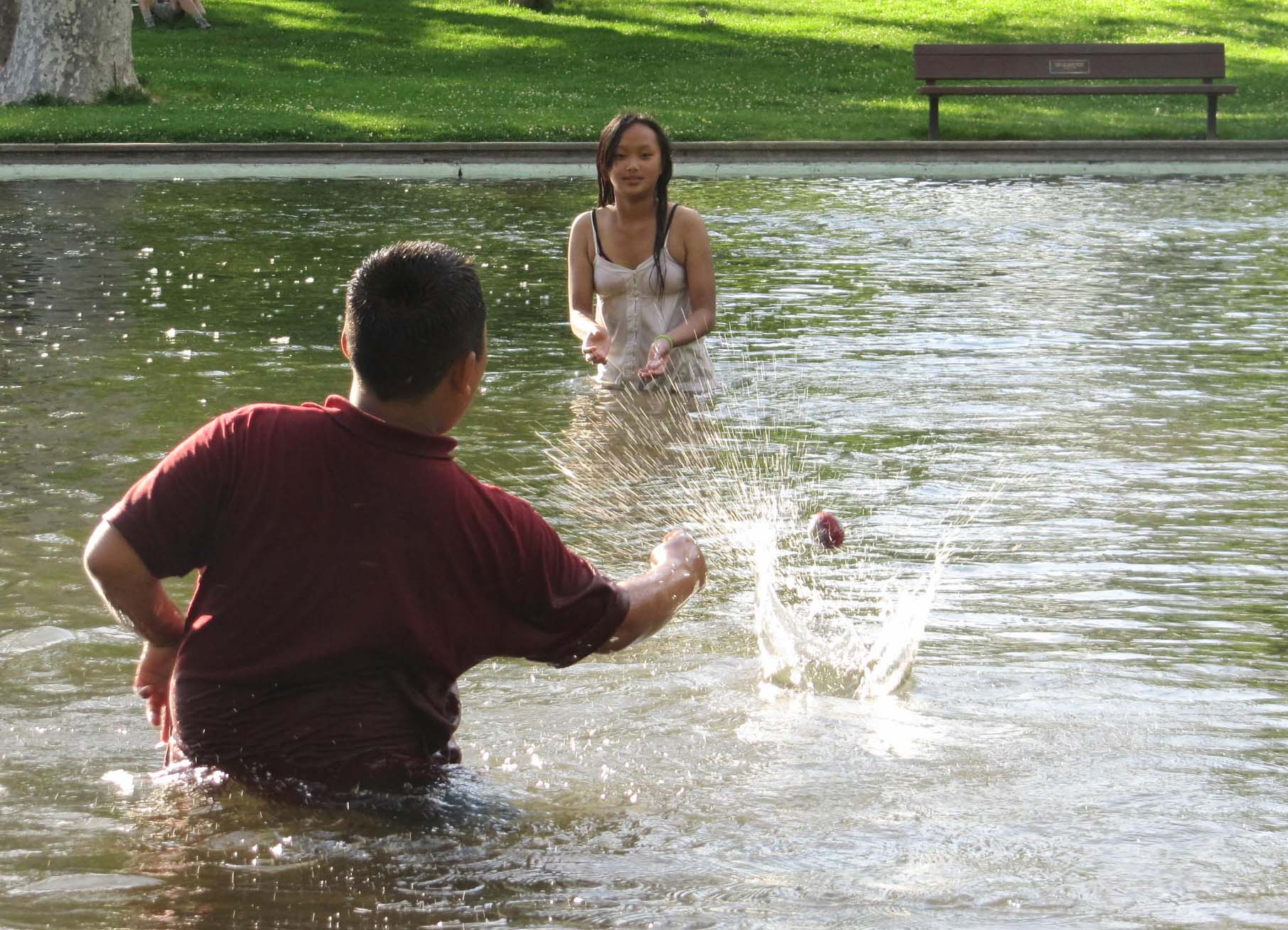
People playing with a water bag.

Water bags and water balls are water sports toys. They are usually round and have a Lycra cover that allows them to bounce on the water. They were invented by Jan Von Heland, and made popular under the brand name Waboba.

They are thrown across the water at varying speeds and angles to skip them across the surface, similar to stone skipping.

Water balls can be used with a variety of apparatuses and equipment, such as launchers, mitts, paddles, nets, and scoops.

They are typically used in bodies of water (such as lakes, rivers, oceans, or pools). It is easier to stand or squat in shallow water than deep water to keep the arms free. In deep water various flotation equipment can be used to free the hands such as a pool noodle, inner tube, kayak or boat.

== In popular culture ==
The term "water ball" usually refers to either a ball that bounces on water or a ball filled with fluid. They are typically palm-sized and can travel as fast as they are thrown. They can travel a great distance, even crossing large moving waterways. High-performance water bags have only been on the US market for 15 years. They were introduced in the summer of 2008 with the launch of the Waboba Ball, followed by the WaterRipper and subsequently the SkipBiscuit.

Splash balls or water balloons are well known to the public and have been on the market in the US for years. They are designed for children and adults to play on a water surface. These are also more suitable for children and non-sport uses. They are not classified as high-performance water balls or water bags.

There are a number of nerf-styled polo water balls on the market that are smaller and softer than the regulation sport polo water ball. These are also more suitable for children and non-sport uses.

Generally, high-performance water bags have little friction on the water, they are relatively small in size and density making them generally a handball size. With a certain amount of force they skip, bounce and glide in a straight line on the water surface and can travel fast and go long distances. They can be projected on the water between players at a range of 3– 200 feet as there is very little friction slowing them on the water surface – particularly the sealed water ball is more suited to distance. Each time they bounce or skip on the water surface, the inertia is reduced by opposing forces of gravity, friction, surface tension, surface drag.

Water bags or water balls have traditionally been seen as a children's toy, with a number of manufacturers aiming for that particular market segment when introducing new products. The WaterRipper is marketed as a children's pool toy and also marketed as a high-performance action sports water ball for adults. Most water bags and water balls are sold in sporting goods, toy stores, outdoor stores and even food stores. The WaterRipper was launched in the United States in July 2010. The Waboba ball was initially marketed overseas, introduced in Scandinavia 2005 and in the United Kingdom in 2008. It is now sold worldwide.

The SkipBiscuit, launched by Ripperball Sports in 2018, is a new-generation, water-absorbing game bag shaped like a rock or biscuit. It has unique water-skimming properties that emulate skipping a rock.

== Size, shape and materials ==
High-performance water bags and water balls are slightly larger than a golf ball and are designed to be caught with a single hand. Different water bags or water balls are made of different materials. Most high-performance water balls are sealed balls and are made out of different types of rubber or neoprene with gel material and polyurethane and Lycra jacket. The new generation water bag is water absorbing with fluid high-density particulate contents. There are patent pending designs for "high density" or "balanced density " materials in making the new generation water bag.

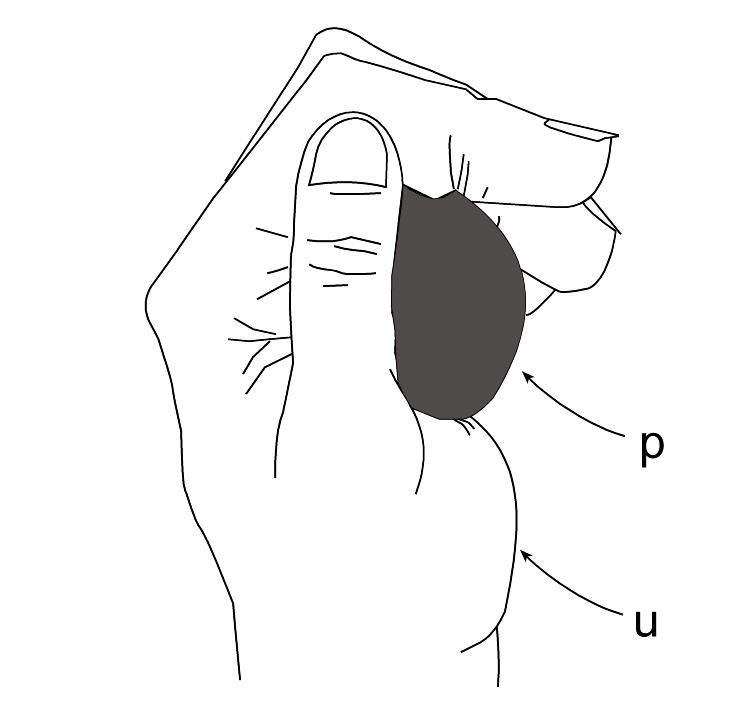
Water Bag being held in hand - size and shape

High-performance water bags or water balls come in different sizes and shapes. There are a handful of high-performance water balls such as Waboba Ball, Water Bouncer currently sold in the US. The sealed or water-absorbing, high-performance water balls are typically 2 inches (51 mm) or larger and made of soft rubber generally with a neoprene single seam jacket. These balls are designed to bounce on the water surface.

The water absorbing water bag is the smallest of these high-performance water sports toys. It is a collapsing bag or sack like a foot bag with an Ultra Suede single seam cover and beaded fill with other water absorbing high-density materials. It is designed to skip and roll on water in a low profile skip pattern. It is less than 2 inches (51 mm) in diameter and it easily fits and collapses in a small child's hand. It looks and feels like a foot bag or Hacky Sack. The WaterRipper is the only water absorbing water bag on the market.

=== Sealed water balls vs. absorbent water bags ===
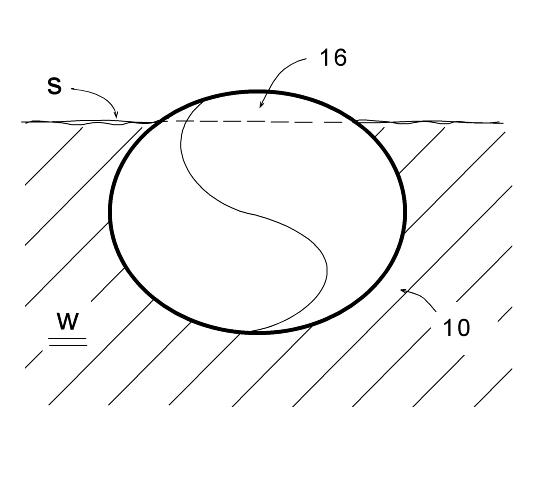
Water Bag floating - water absorbing, balanced density design

The two main types of high-performance water-skimming toys are water balls and water bags. While both float on water, water balls are sealed, causing them to repel water. Water bags, which are not sealed, absorb water. Sealed water balls generally bounce higher because they repel and displace water.

Both water balls and bags require the players to have a grip or "timed grab" to catch the ball in flight and stop it. Because water balls bounce, they are generally harder to catch. They often require two hands, a mitt, or a glove to catch. This makes them more suited for adults than for kids.

Conversely, the water absorbing collapsing water bag is generally caught with one hand. Because it collapses on impact with the water or a player's hand, it is easier to use and safer for young children.

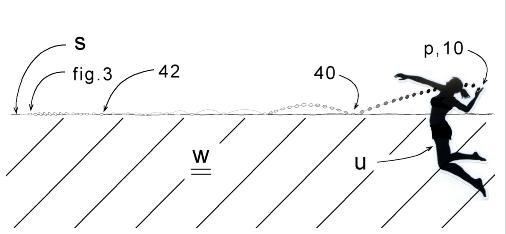
Water Bag being thrown - the physics and motion.

A sealed ball displaces and bounces on water as it interacts with the water surface. On impact, the water bag deforms and deflects causing it to transfer its energy on impact and shed water. The sealed water ball still maintains its spherical shape and ball-like properties. The fluid dynamics and shape characteristics are relatively unchanged as the sealed water ball does not change its density.

Tennis balls, handballs, and stress balls can also be used as water balls.

Water absorbing bags, or more commonly referred to as "water bags", are designed for water and density exchange. Water freely permeates the whole bag, adding more weight and dynamic fluid density. The added weight makes the water bag skip and roll on water, rather than bounce like a ball. As a result, water absorbing high-performance water bags travel shorter distances than sealed water balls but they are easier to control and play with both in long and short range.

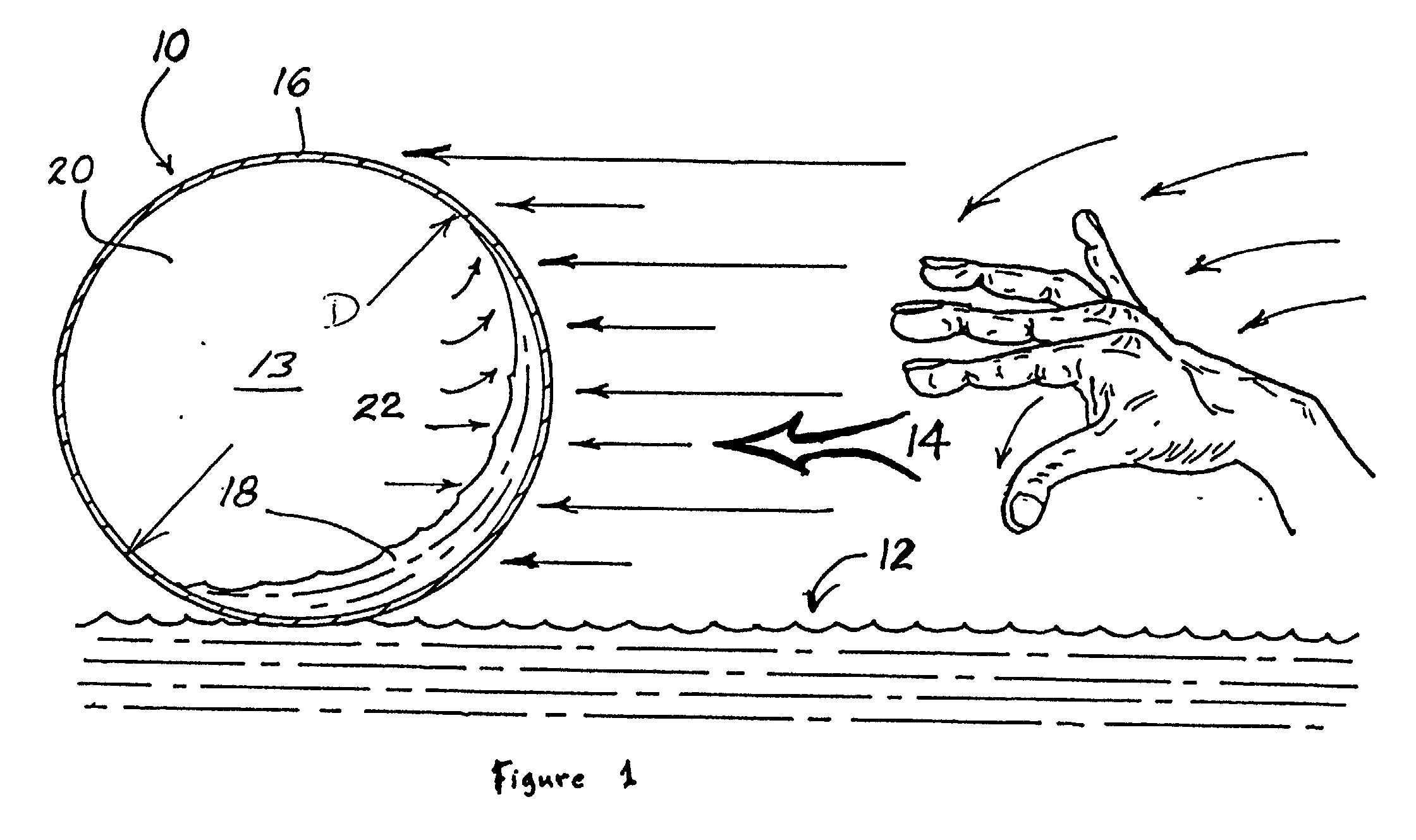
Water Bag being thrown by a player - Low profile skip pattern.

A water bag exchanges its fluid density and transforms and conforms its shape and fluid contents on impact with a surface or plain. On impact with a surface such as water, the water bag dissipates its energy dynamically as it interacts with the water surface exchanging fluid contents. This changes and balances the bag's density, mass and shape to conform to the water or surface it is performing on as it loses its velocity and comes to rest.

The bean bag-like design of the water bag changes shape and conforms to a surface thus it collapses and is "slow acting" on impact. There is a significant difference between the physics of the sealed water ball and the water absorbing water bag.

The water bag exchanges its fluid contents on impact and it changes its shape as it collapses on impact. There is no bouncing or minimal bouncing action. Slow acting on impact is an intended design characteristic that is very pleasing and safe in high-speed play action. The "rolling action" of the water bag is referred to as a "low skip profile" on the water surface that again collapses on impact with the water surface or player's hand. This makes the water bag less active and easier to catch. The water bag is both fast in action and slow acting on impact.

== Safety issues ==
Most water balls currently available, while perfectly functional in water, are not designed to work well on a hard surface. Water bags behave like a bean bag thus they do not have the same impact as a bouncy ball. When a water bag hits a pool deck, it will roll rather than bounce like a water ball. In addition, the impact of a water ball can cause bodily harm, and some water balls have even left visible marks on the skin. However, there are several balls that address these issues by using softer and lighter material. They have a low skip pattern, are easy to catch, and tend to stay in the pool. Water-absorbing designs are also more suitable for play in crowded pools.
