= Pernille Sørensen =

Pernille Sørensen may refer to:

- Pernille Sørensen (figure skater)
- Pernille Sørensen (actress)
