= Milan'em Mall =

Shopping mall in Madurai, India

Coordinates: 9.927793°N 78.143193°E

Milan'em Mall is a shopping mall in K.K. Nagar, Madurai, India. It was opened on 28 September 2009 and is the first shopping mall in Madurai. Built in a half-acre site, the mall has five floors with a gross leasable area of 90,000 sq ft (8,400 m^{2}). The mall has a food court in the third floor along with water zorbing for kids. The atrium of the mall is used to host cultural events.
