= Fredrik Skavlan =

Norwegian TV host, journalist, and cartoonist

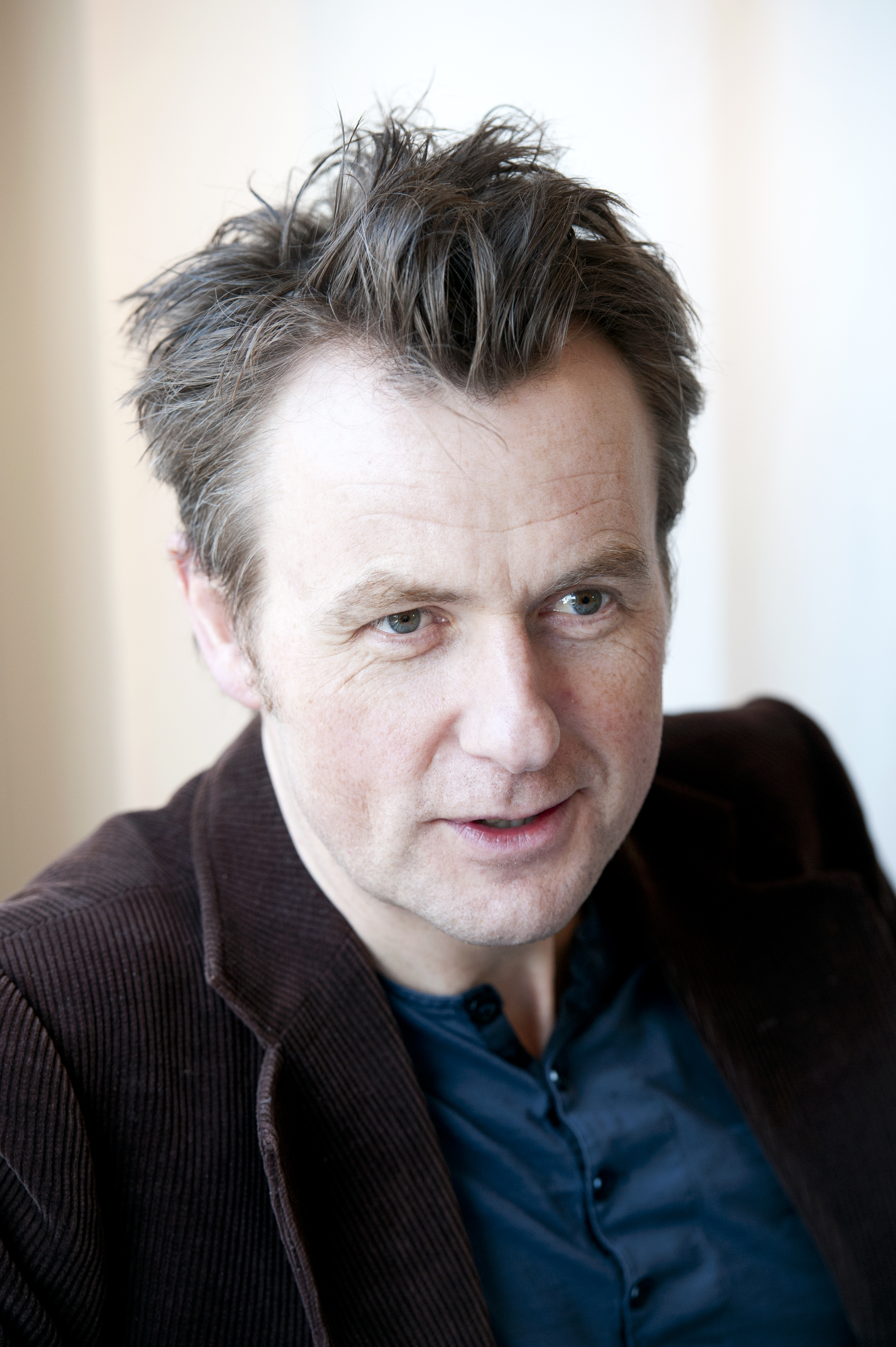
- Skavlan in 2012
- Born: 2 September 1966 (age 59); Oslo, Norway
- Occupations: TV host, journalist, cartoonist
- Notable work: Først & sist (1998–2007); Skavlan (2009–2021)
- Partner: Maria Bonnevie (2006–present)
- Children: 6

Fredrik Skavlan (born 2 September 1966) is a Norwegian TV host, journalist, and cartoonist. He hosted the talk show Først & sist from 1998 to 2007, for which he won the 1999 Norwegian Television Award for best host as well as the talk show Skavlan from 2009 to 2021, for which he won the Swedish Television Award for Best Television Host. Skavlan originally worked as a journalist and cartoonist for several Norwegian newspapers, including Morgenbladet and Dagbladet.

== Early life ==
Skavlan was born on 2 September 1966 in Oslo, Norway.

== Career ==
From 1998 to 2007, Skavlan hosted the talk show Først & sist (First & Last), which attracted more than one million viewers every Friday evening. He won the 1999 Norwegian Television Award for best host. After taking a break from the Norwegian public broadcaster NRK, he was persuaded to host his own show for Sweden's SVT in the spring of 2009, Skavlan.

Skavlan won the Swedish Television Award for Best Television Host, the first Norwegian to do so. In the autumn of 2009, the program started broadcasting on both NRK and SVT. Since autumn 2013 the show is also broadcast on the Danish secondary channel DR2.

Skavlan originally worked as a journalist and cartoonist for several Norwegian newspapers, including Morgenbladet and Dagbladet. He has also illustrated several books, including Unni Lindell's children's book Nifse Nella og nattskolen (Spooky Stella and the Night School) (2008).

== Personal life ==
Since 2006, Skavlan has been in a relationship with Swedish-Norwegian actress Maria Bonnevie, and together they have three children. He lives in Oslo and Stockholm, and has six children, three of them with his former wife. He is the uncle of the Norwegian model, actress, television presenter, and author Jenny Skavlan.

== Filmography ==
=== Television ===
- Først & sist (1998–2007)
- Skavlan (2009–2021)

== Awards ==
Year	Nominee/work	Award	Result
1999	Først & sist (First & Last)	Norwegian Television Award	Won
2010	Skavlan	Nordens språkpris	Won
2011	Skavlan	Swedish Television Award	Won
