= Javed Kurd =

Pakistani-Norwegian music producer (born 1967)

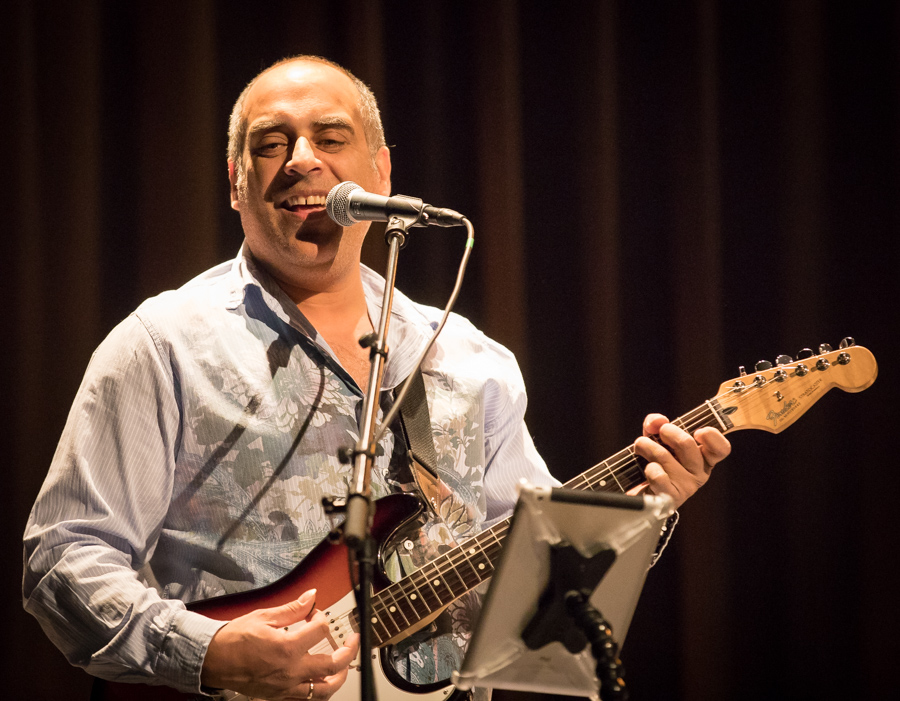
Javed Kurd at Cosmopolite Scene in Oslo in 2017

Javed Nadeem Kurd (born 1967) is a Pakistani-Norwegian music producer.

He was born in London to a Pakistani father and a Norwegian mother, but they soon moved to Kristiansand. Kurd took partial education at both the Kristiansand Music Conservatory and the University of Oslo. Since 1997 he has worked as a producer for the Norwegian participants in the Eurovision Song Contest. The only exceptions were in 2002, where Norway was not allowed to participate, and in 2005. For the Norwegian Broadcasting Corporation he has worked with the music program Beat for beat, and made the theme music for Sommeråpent, Nytt på nytt and Den store klassefesten. He worked with Ingrid Bjørnov in her television show Piano piano and other aspects of her career since 1997. He has also produced albums for The Monroes, Jahn Teigen and Anita Skorgan. He is married, and lives in Heggedal.
