= Metropol TV =

Ownership
- Owner: Juritzen AS
- Sister channels: -

History
- Launched: 30 September 1999
- Closed: 27 February 2002

Metropol TV was a local TV channel for Oslo, Norway but could be seen in the rest of the country through cable TV. The channel was started in 1999 and ceased broadcasting in February 2002 due to financial difficulties.

Metropol TV cast shows like "En lun aften", promoting comedians Atle Antonsen and Johan Golden.It also had a show called Metropol Live every weekday, with hosts like Sarah Natasha Melbye, Anders Hornslien and others.

== Programming ==
- En L.U.N. aften med Golden og Antonsen
- Frem fra trengselen
- Håvard Lilleheie Show
- MAD TV
- Banzai
- Cracker
- Father Ted
- WKRP in Cincinnati
- Late Show with David Letterman
- King of the Hill
- Cheers
- Metropol Live
- Babes in the Wood
- The Hunger
- Homicide: Life on the Street
- An Unsuitable Job For A Woman
- City Life
- Drop the Beat
- Wildside
- Picket Fences
- The Chief
- Men Behaving Badly
- The Fast Show
- Daria
- Beavis and Butt-Head
- Chicago Sons
- Dweebs
- Game On
- The Tom Green Show
- UK Raw
- Nigella Bites
- Doogie Howser, M.D.
- Murder One
- Power Play
- Spy Game
- So Graham Norton
