= The Political Party (Norway) =

The Political Party Det politiske parti
- Abbreviation: dpp
- Leader: Johan Golden and Atle Antonsen
- Founder: Johan Golden and Atle Antonsen
- Founded: 2000
- Dissolved: 2001
- Ideology: Satire; Direct democracy

The Political Party (Det politiske parti) was a satirical political party that was active in Norway from 2000 to 2001. It was established by comedians Johan Golden and Atle Antonsen. The party made its entry in Norwegian politics during the 2001 Norwegian parliamentary election. The two leaders were noted for introducing slogans like "Atle Antonsen — Working for all the people" and "Johan Golden — Your slave in parliament". Golden was also fronted as the party's candidate for Prime Minister.

According to the party's platform, any representative of the party elected to parliament was to vote whatever the people wanted him or her to vote. To find out what the people wanted, they were to hold a poll on their web-site for every parliamentary issue the party got involved in. They also claimed that, were the people to vote 70% in favour and 30% against an issue, they would work 70% for it and 30% against it. Thus, the Political Party in some sense promoted the thought of direct democracy. The party program states that the Political Party is founded on the ideals of freedom, justice and politics.

In the general election of 2001, the party got nearly 1% of all votes made. The result was rather different in the school-elections where the Political Party got 8% of the votes. If these had been parliamentary elections, the party would have gained approximately 12 representatives in parliament.

The Political Party was active only in the general election of 2001.

== Electoral results ==
Election	% of total votes	# of seats won	# of total votes
2001	0.77	0	19,457

== Notes ==
An electoral propaganda poster that depicts the Political Party's idea of direct democracy.
