= Knut Nærum =

Norwegian comedian, author, comics writer and TV entertainer

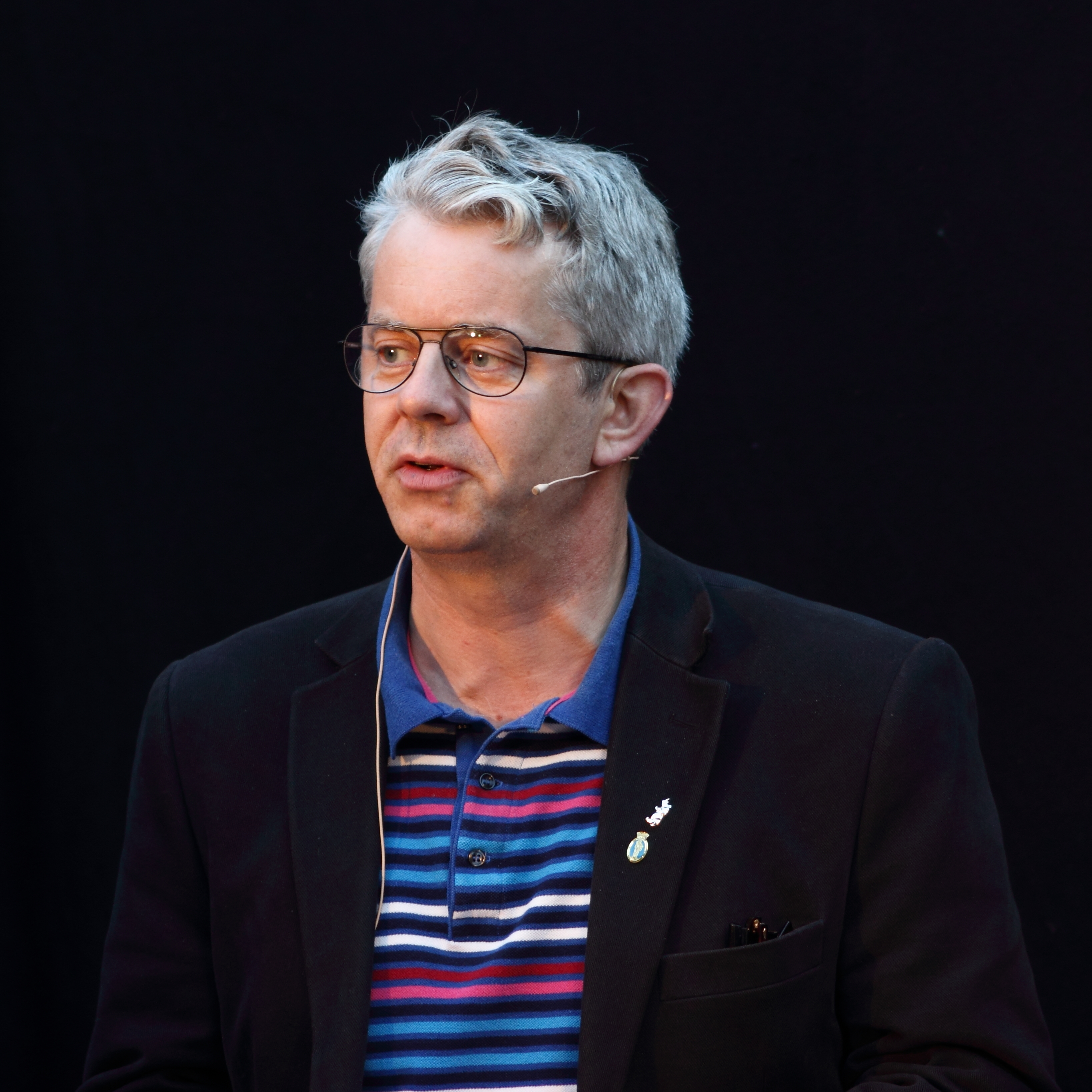
- Nærum at the Oslo Bookfestival in 2011.
- Born: 3 March 1961 (age 65); Arendal, Norway
- Occupations: Comedian, author, comics writer and TV entertainer
- Political party: Red Party
- Children: 2

Knut Nærum (born 3 March 1961) is a Norwegian comedian, author, comics writer and TV entertainer. He is best known for being one of the permanent panelists in the Norwegian show Nytt på nytt ("News Anew"). On 23 April 2015, Nærum announced that he would step down from the show at the end of the season. Nærum was born in Arendal, but grew up in Halden, and attended high school in Grimstad Municipality. He later studied at the Agder Regional College and currently lives in Oslo with his wife and two children.

Nærum has written several books, including Å (2000), Norsk litteraturhistorie, fritt etter hukommelsen (2001), Døde menn går på ski (2002), Krig! (2003), En himmel full av stjerner (2004), Madonna-gåten (2005, with Elisabeth Botterli and Peder Udnæs), Monster (2007), De dødes båt (2008) and Sitt ned og hold kjeft (2010). He is also the creator of the satirical comic strip Bloid.

He also had a minor role in the Norwegian movie Trollhunter (Norwegian: Trolljegeren).

He is a member of the leftist Red Party, and stood for election as a minor candidate for its predecessor Red Electoral Alliance.
