= Golden Goal (TV series) =

Norwegian television series

Golden Goal is a comedy talkshow about sports, hosted by Johan Golden and Henrik Elvestad on Norwegian TV2. The show features interviews with athletes, presentations of exotic and unusual sports from around the world, comedic reenactments of sports history events, and tests of "improvements" to well-known sports. The show is currently in its 3rd season - holding a market share of about 35% in its time slot.

== Guests ==
Each week Johan invites a high-profile guest for the show's main interview. He places an emphasis on portraying the guests in a way that conveys their popularity with the public. The guests range from current/recent athletes such as Aksel Lund Svindal (alpine skiing) and Kjetil André Aamodt (alpine skiing), Ole Einar Bjørndalen (biathlon), Andreas Thorkildsen (javelin), Marit Bjørgen (cross country skiing) and Anders Jacobsen (ski jump) to evergreen sporting heroes such as Johann Olav Koss (skating), Gunde Svan (cross country skiing), Thomas Ravelli (football), Jan Boklöv (ski jump) and Thomas Alsgaard (cross country skiing). In addition, the show has been guested by popular Norwegian TV commentators the likes of Davy Wathne (TV2) and Arne Scheie (NRK), and profiled coaches and sports personalities such as Nils Arne Eggen (former Rosenborg manager), Åge Hareide (former national team coach), Ståle Solbakken (former national team player, now manager) and John Shittu (football agent).

== Sports history reenactments ==
Johan has taken on the mission to recreate some of the greatest moments in the history of Norwegian sports. Together with the athletes themselves, he has done remakes of:

• notable events such as Norway's unlikely World Cup win against Brazil in 1998, Bruce Grobbelaars European Cup-winning spaghetti legs of 1984.

•, the Norwegian handball team beating East Germany in 1986, and the cross country skiing drama when Oddvar Brå broke his skiing pole and ultimately shared his victory with Russia's Savyalov.

• Low points such as Erik Thorstvedt's devastating debut as a Tottenham goalkeeper in 1989, goalie Bjarte Flem's own goal, and coach Harald Aabrekks notorious dive towards the end of a match, pretending to be "dead" in order to waste time.

To make a proper remake of these moments, Johan invites the original participants to partake in the reenactments. The decisive penalty of the Norway-Brazil World Cup match was recreated by the help of Kjetil Rekdal (penalty taker), coach Egil "Drillo" Olsen, Nils Johan Semb (assistant coach) and Arne Scheie (sports commentator). In the remake of Norway's handball win against East Germany, Johan reunited the entire Norwegian team dating from 1986, including ten original players, the coach, and the original TV commentators.

At times the actual protagonists are somewhat difficult to get by, as in the remake of international player Svein Grøndalen's brutal meeting with a moose. Whereas Grøndalen played himself, Johan stepped up to the plate to portray the angry moose.

== Portraits ==
Henrik has travelled across Norway and Europe to visit and spend a day with international footballers, athletes and childhood heroes such as Morten Gamst Pedersen, Henning Solberg, Aksel Lund Svindal, Ailo Gaup, Jørn Andersen and Preben Elkjær. Henrik often gets a crack at their sport – on visiting Henning Solberg during the shakedown to "Rally Catalunya" this year, Henrik got to take a spin in Solberg's car himself (after having congested the engine a couple of times). He also tried to impress Gamst Pedersen with his keepy-uppie, with only partial success.

Henrik visits athletes beyond highly successful Scandinavian ones. In spring 2007 he went to Scotland to visit Carl Erik Thywissen, a Norwegian professional earning £10 a week playing for East Stirlingshire F.C. in Scotland. After the segment was aired on Golden Goal, a Norwegian supporter branch was established and grew to become the third-largest supporter club in Norway for a British team. This attention has been said to have contributed to the club's performance that season, with East Stirlingshire finishing in a midtable position in the Scottish league system.

== Exotic Sports ==
During the series, Henrik has visited, tried and presented to the viewers a wide range of "exclusive" and "exotic" sports around the world. These include Canarian wrestling, a form of folk wrestling from the Canary Islands, bobsleighs doing 125 km/h (77.6 mp/h), reindeer racing in 30 degrees below zero, boomerang throwing, Australian rules football, polo, cricket, Morrisdancing, and rugby, amongst others.

== Challenges ==
In the segment type called "The Challenge" Henrik has invited a number of celebrities to give it a go at well-known sports, such as athletics, diving, gymnastics, weightlifting and kayaking. The celebrities include Norwegian actors, comedians, musicians, a priest, TV-presenters amongst others.

== Sport improvements ==
In this segment type, the presenters take well-known sports, suggest improvements to them, and try them out together with known athletes. For example, they have tested biathlon with machine guns and military vehicles, electroshock football, automobile curling and hillside football.

== Top 3 ==
In the recurring studio segment "This week's Top 3", Henrik presents bloopers from all kinds of sports. He sheds a weekly light on comic mishaps, presenting lists such as:

- "So you thought you came in first?", "Audience, stay where you are", "Ouch! I'm glad that wasn’t me" and "Hey goalie, what the !?D"# %&% were you thinking?".
