= Sissel Gran =

Norwegian psychologist

Sissel Gran (born 1951) is a Norwegian psychologist, couple therapist and non-fiction writer.

Educated as a psychologist at the University of Oslo, she has a couple therapy clinic at Ulsrud in Oslo. Her books have been described as "a mixture of popular psychology, self-help manual and essays". She has also been a columnist in Aftenposten, VG and Morgenbladet.

== Bibliography ==
- Kjærlighet i hastighetens tid (Aschehoug, 2004)
- Kjærlighetens tre porter: vendepunkter i nye og gamle forhold (Aschehoug, 2007)
- Hekta på et håp om kjærlighet (with Nora Skaug, Aschehoug, 2010)
- Det er slutt: historier om løsrivelse (Aschehoug, 2016)
- Inni er vi alltid unge: aldringsmeditasjoner (Aschehoug, 2019)
