= Unni Drougge =

Swedish author, columnist and journalist

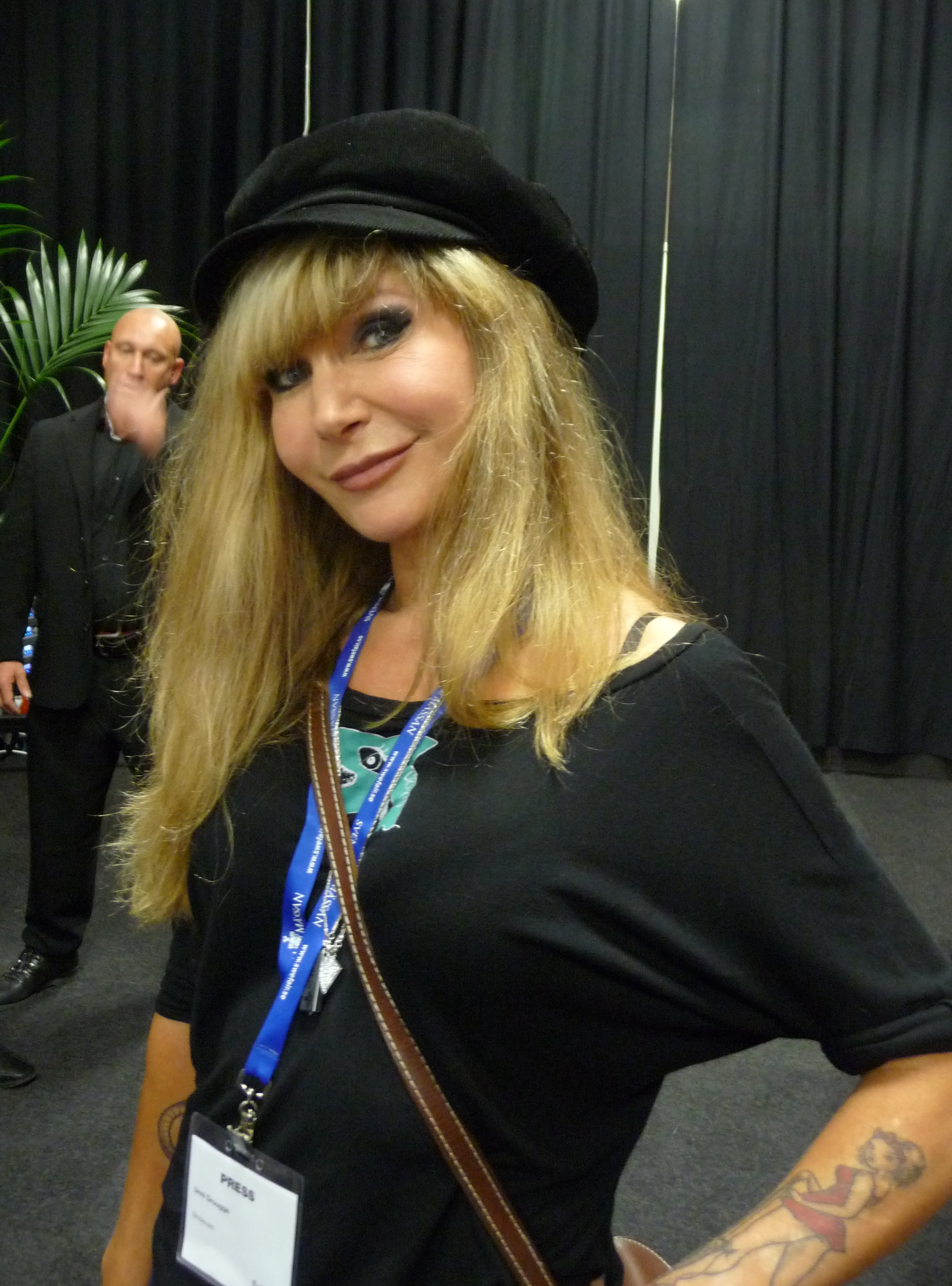
- Drougge in 2009
- Born: 1 April 1956 (age 69); Lund, Sweden
- Occupation(s): Author, columnist, journalist
- Spouse: Mats Drougge

Unni Lis Jorunn Drougge, née Wennberg (born 1 April 1956) is a Swedish author, columnist and journalist. At an early age she dropped out of high school and started working at a kibbutz in Israel. Later she moved back to Sweden and got a degree in psychology. During the 1980s, she lived a green way life in Hörby, Skåne along with her then husband Mats Drougge.

They published the underground magazine April and founded SAMAE – Sammanslutningen av medvetet arbetsskygga element, a satirical movement about Sweden's work-politics. Since 1991, Unni Drougge is living in Stockholm.

== Bibliography ==
- Jag, jag, jag, 1994 (debut)
- Andra sidan Alex, 1996
- Regnbågens tid, 1997
- Heroine, 1998
- Meningen med män, 1999
- Hella Hells bekännelser, 2001
- Slyngstad Events, 2002
- Lutherska Badet, 2003
- Penetrering, 2006
- Boven i mitt drama kallas kärlek, 2007
- Bluffen, 2010
- Förkunnaren, 2011
- Kärlek ända in i döden, 2011
