= Waboba =

Swedish outdoor toy company

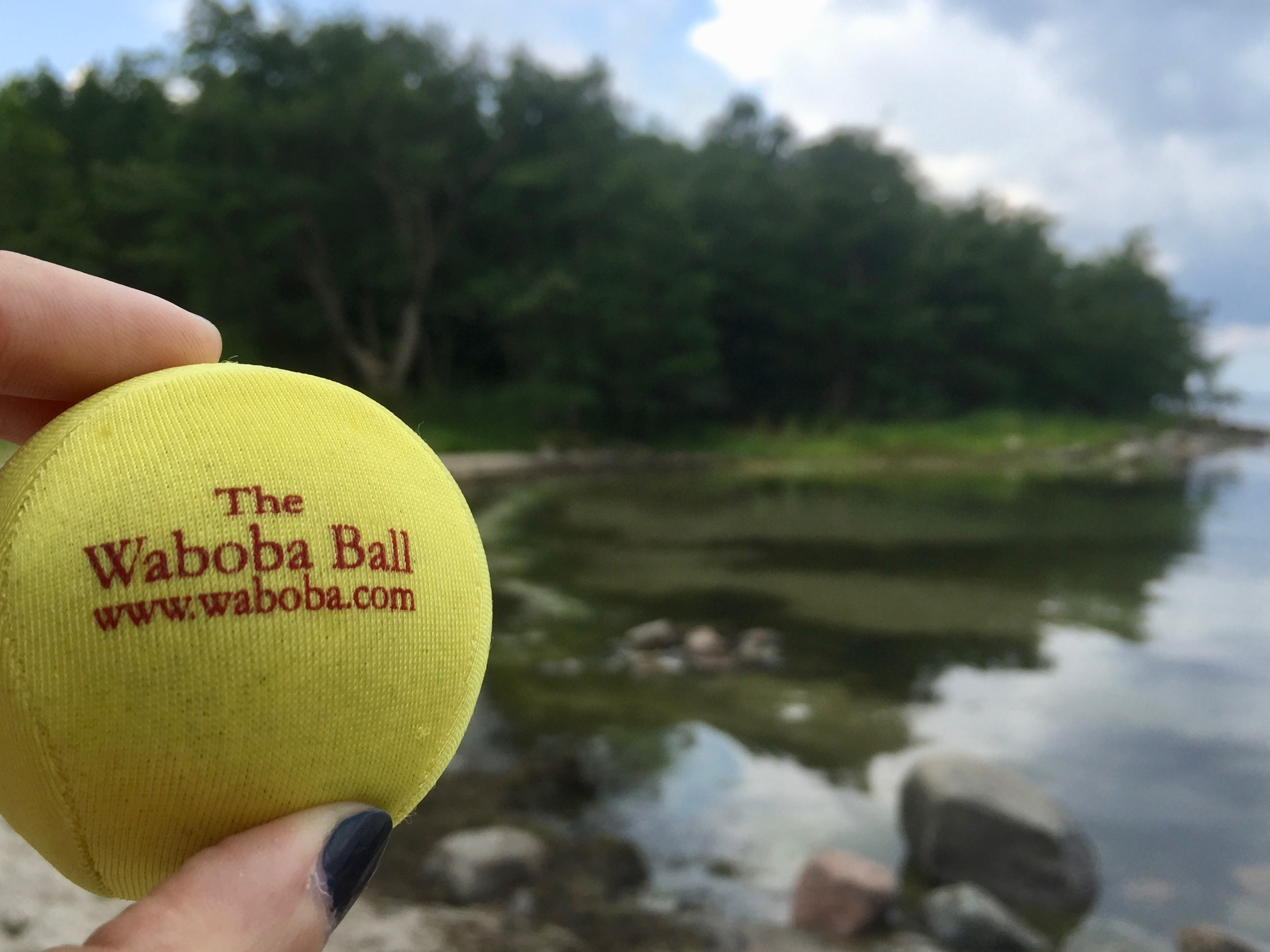
The original Waboba ball and the beach in Sweden where it was invented.

Waboba is an international outdoor toy and sporting goods brand headquartered in Stockholm, Sweden with offices in Atlanta, Georgia and Guangzhou, China. Waboba is most known for its invention of balls that bounce on water, the high bouncing Moon Ball, and the Wingman silicone flying disc. The company specializes in beach and backyard toys and games. The slogan used in advertising is Keep Life Fun. The name Waboba is a registered trademark and many of its products are internationally patented.

== Name ==
"Waboba" is short for "water bouncing ball", named after the company's first invention.

== History ==
In Sweden in the early 1980s, inventor Jan Von Heland got the idea of creating something that skips on water after throwing a Frisbee upside down and noticing it skims the surface of water much like skipping a rock. Over the years, he began to test different shapes, materials, and compositions until he discovered in 2002 that a ball could bounce more efficiently than other balls on water if it was soft and had a Lycra covering which enables easy flow separation at the hydrodynamic stagnation point. In 2004, Jan created the commercial concept for balls that bounce on water, and eventually patented what has become the Waboba Ball.

The ball is made of different types of polyurethane covered in Lycra, allowing it to bounce on water and float. To bounce the ball on the water, one must throw like skipping a rock. The ball bounces high on the water in between players when thrown at the right angle (overhand) with the right force. The ball does not bounce on land.

To date, there are 12 different types of Waboba balls (Original, Pro, Mini, Extreme, Surf, Blast, Zoobers, Big Kahuna, Tides, Sol, Zag, and Fetch for dogs).

On April 1, 2016, Waboba was featured on The History Channels' Million Dollar Genius for Jan von Heland's invention of the ball that bounces on water. (Season 1, Episode 7 "Bigger is Better").

== Geographical spread ==
The Waboba Water Bouncing Ball was first introduced in Sweden in 2005, where it was sold for two years before it was introduced to new markets in Europe, United States, and Australia in the summer of 2007. As of 2019, Waboba products are distributed in over 75 countries.

== Products ==
=== Water Bouncing Balls ===
- Pro - engineered for athletic control and accuracy in the lake or ocean.
- Extreme - bounces fast, far, and high in the lake or ocean.
- Surf, for beginners. It is soft and easy to handle in the lake or ocean.
- Big Kahuna, the biggest and most versatile Waboba ball for all water environments - lakes, oceans, and pools.
- Blast, engineered for pool play.
- Fetch, water-retrieval ball for dogs
- SOL, bigger than the original it uses a foam core and changes color in the sun.

=== Water accessories ===
- Catch - neoprene glove paired with the Waboba Pro for water play.
- Waboba Lacrosse - in 2014, Waboba partnered with STX to release water lacrosse using FiddleSTX and a Waboba Extreme ball.
- Water Cracket - a cricket bat paired with a water bouncing ball.

=== Land items ===
- Spizzy - round foam with zig-zag stripes.
- Octzilla - like Moon but less angular.
- Moon - super high-bouncing land ball
- Street - unusual shape gives it an unpredictable bounce
- Flyer - an oversized shuttlecock that lets you hit it with your hands, knees, feet, or rackets.
- Wingman - a foldable, silicone disc.

== Awards ==
- Special Needs Approved by AblePlay
- Dr. Toy Best Toy for Vacation
- Gold Award, Family Review Center
- Moon Ball 2013 Toy of the Year Award winner by Creative Child Magazine
- Cancun Games Inaugural Event - December 2023 (Cody Livingston, Josh Jordan, Ryan Doliner, Tye Powers, Geoff Camplin, and some Scott guy)

== Physics ==
An elastic ball that bounces on water, the Waboba water ball flattens like a pancake when it hits the water surface, increasing its lift and propelling it upward. When it hits the water at a shallow angle, it too creates a bowl-shaped depression. But because it is soft, the ball flattens into a disc-shape when it hits the surface and this allows it to aquaplane efficiently across the surface. And the angle of the bowl-shaped depression causes it to launch into the air where the ball regains its shape, making it look as if it has bounced. The process is remarkably similar to the way stones skip across water, even though they are denser than the liquid. A shallow impact with the water surface creates a bowl-shaped depression that launches the stone into the air as it leaves.

== Naval use ==
Researchers with the U.S. Navy's University Laboratory Initiative have been studying the mechanics and elasticity of the Waboba balls. The military branch is interested in how elasticity affects motion in water.

All balls can bounce on water when thrown at a shallow angle with sufficient speed to hydroplane.

This was the principle employed by WW2-period British inventor Barnes Wallace when he developed the "bouncing bomb" used in the famous "Dam Busters" raid against the Ruhr District dams. He had been inspired by the story of a technique historically used by the British navy that bounced spherical cannonballs off the ocean surface to achieve accurate hits against enemy ships. Wallace worked out the physics by bouncing marbles, steel spheres, and various sizes and shapes of balls across a pond and then a long trough before progressing to larger-scale experiments. Even solid steel balls would bounce across water. Ordinary tennis balls or any other plastic balls can skip on water if thrown at a low angle at a fast speed.
