= Anne-Kat. Hærland =

Norwegian satirical comedian (born 1972)

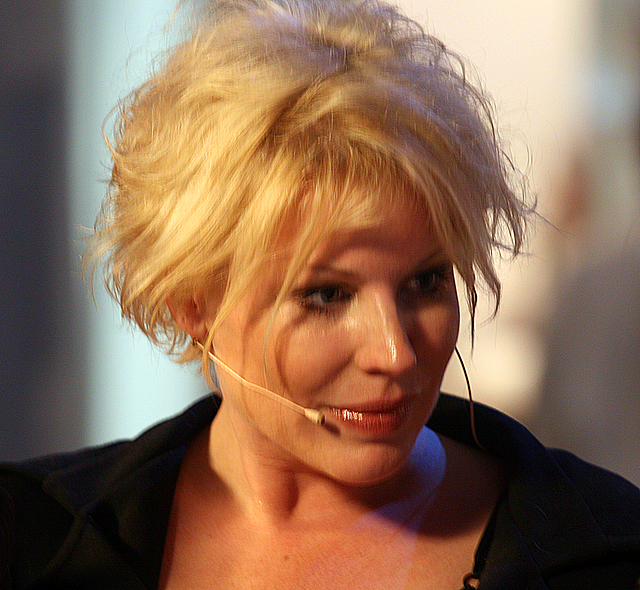
- Anne-Kat. Hærland in 2008.
- Born: Anne Katrine Hærland; 27 March 1972 (age 54); Oslo, Norway
- Spouse(s): Espen Hauglid (m. 2007; div. 2009), Kåre João Pedersen (m. 2017; div. 2021)

Comedy career
- Medium: Television, stand-up
- Genre: Satire

Anne Katrine Hærland (born 27 March 1972) is a Norwegian satirical comedian mostly known for her regular appearances on the weekly news satire show Nytt på nytt.

She made her television debut in 1996 with the show Direkte lykke, and then had two more shows Bombay Surprise (1997) and Bla bla bla (1999). From 1999 to 2007 she worked in Nytt på nytt.

On 11 November 2003, Hærland drove under the influence of alcohol, with a blood alcohol level of 0.126%. During the drive in Frogner, Oslo, she crashed into two cars; One parked with no occupants and one with a driver who was waiting at traffic lights. As a result of the incident she was convicted of driving under the influence, of reckless driving and of attempting to leave the scene of an accident. Having confessed to the charges, Hærland was sentenced to 30 days of prison and a fine of 90000 kr. She also lost her driver's licence for a two-year period. Having served her sentence at Fredrikstad Prison, with five days off for good behavior, she was released on 7 June 2005.

In 2005 she wrote a book called: Krig & Fred & Religion & Politikk & Sånn (War & Peace & Religion & Politics & Stuff).
