= Ulf Ellervik =

Swedish professor of organic chemistry

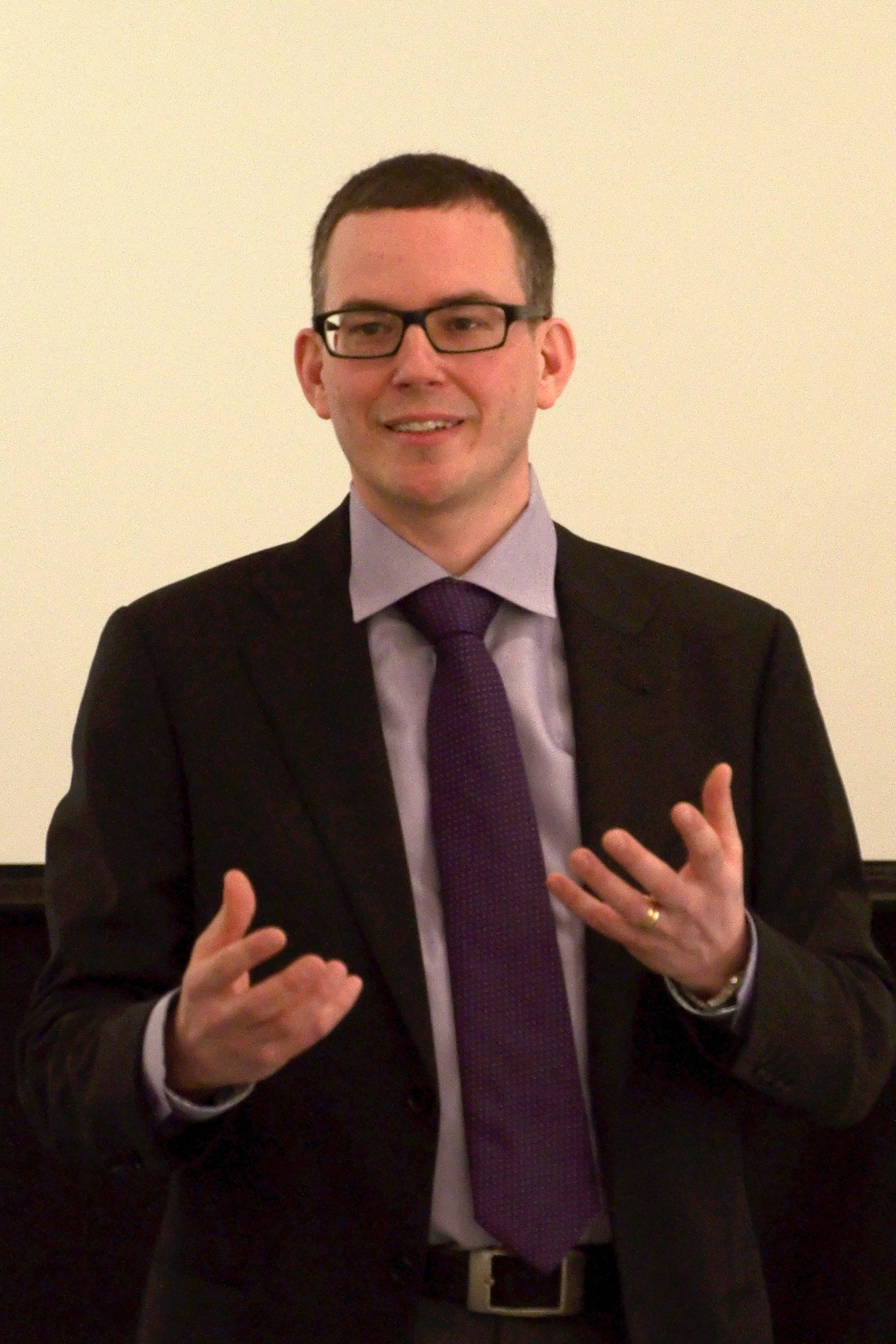
Ulf Ellervik, 2010

Ulf Ellervik (born 7 December 1969) is a Swedish professor of bioorganic chemistry at Lund University. Ellervik's main research area is carbohydrates, such as eye drops against the viral disease epidemic keratoconjunctivitis and the carbohydrate xylose as the cure for cancer. Ellervik received his undergraduate training at the Faculty of Engineering (LTH) where he started in 1989. He graduated as M.Sc. in Chemical Engineering in 1993 and began research in organic chemistry in 1994. After presenting his thesis in October 1998 he spent almost two years working at California Institute of Technology as a post-doctoral fellow. From Caltech he went back to Lund University where he now holds a position as professor.

Ellervik has received prizes from the student association as well as academic prizes. In 2006 he received the degree of Excellent Teaching Practice (ETP) and in 2009 he was promoted to professor.

Ellervik regularly writes popular articles for journals, magazines and newspapers. His most recent articles deal with the seven deadly sins from a chemical perspective.

== Books (in Swedish) ==
- Njutning: berättelser om kärlek, känslor och kemi. Stockholm: Fri tanke. Libris 13894342. ISBN 978-91-86061-46-3 (2013)
- Ond kemi: berättelser om människor, mord och molekyler. Lidingö: Fri Tanke. Libris 12127138. ISBN 978-91-86061-30-2 (2011)
- Organisk kemi. Lund: Studentlitteratur. Libris 10454110. ISBN 978-91-44-03721-9 (2007)
