= Zorbing =

Sport of rolling downhill inside a ball

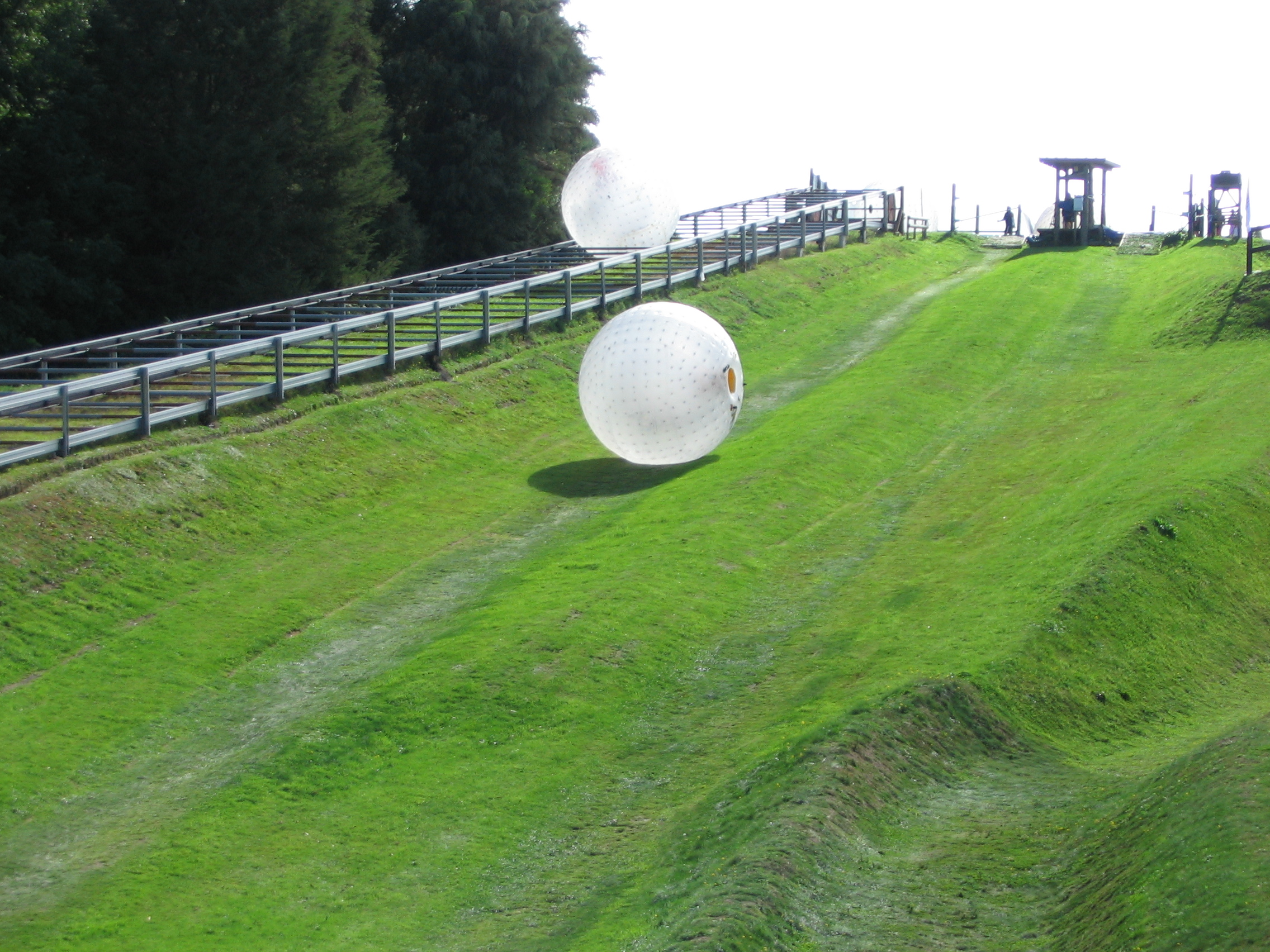
- Zorbs in Rotorua, New Zealand
- Highest governing body: ZORB Limited
- First played: 1994, Rotorua, Bay of Plenty, New Zealand

Characteristics
- Type: Indoor or outdoor and extreme
- Equipment: Zorb

Zorbing (also known as globe-riding, sphereing or orbing) is the recreation or sport of rolling downhill inside a zorb, an orb or ball with a smaller ball inside and an air layer in between the two, typically made of transparent plastic. Zorbing is generally performed on a gentle slope but can also be done on a level surface, permitting more rider control. In the absence of hills, some operators have constructed inflatable, wooden, or metal ramps. Due to the buoyant nature of the orbs, zorbing can also take place on water, provided the orb is inflated properly and sealed once the rider is inside. Water walking using such orbs has become popular in theme parks across the UK.

There are two types of orbs: harnessed and non-harnessed. Non-harnessed orbs carry up to three riders, while the harnessed orbs are constructed for one to two riders. The first zorbing site was established in Rotorua, New Zealand, by ZORB Ltd.

== History ==
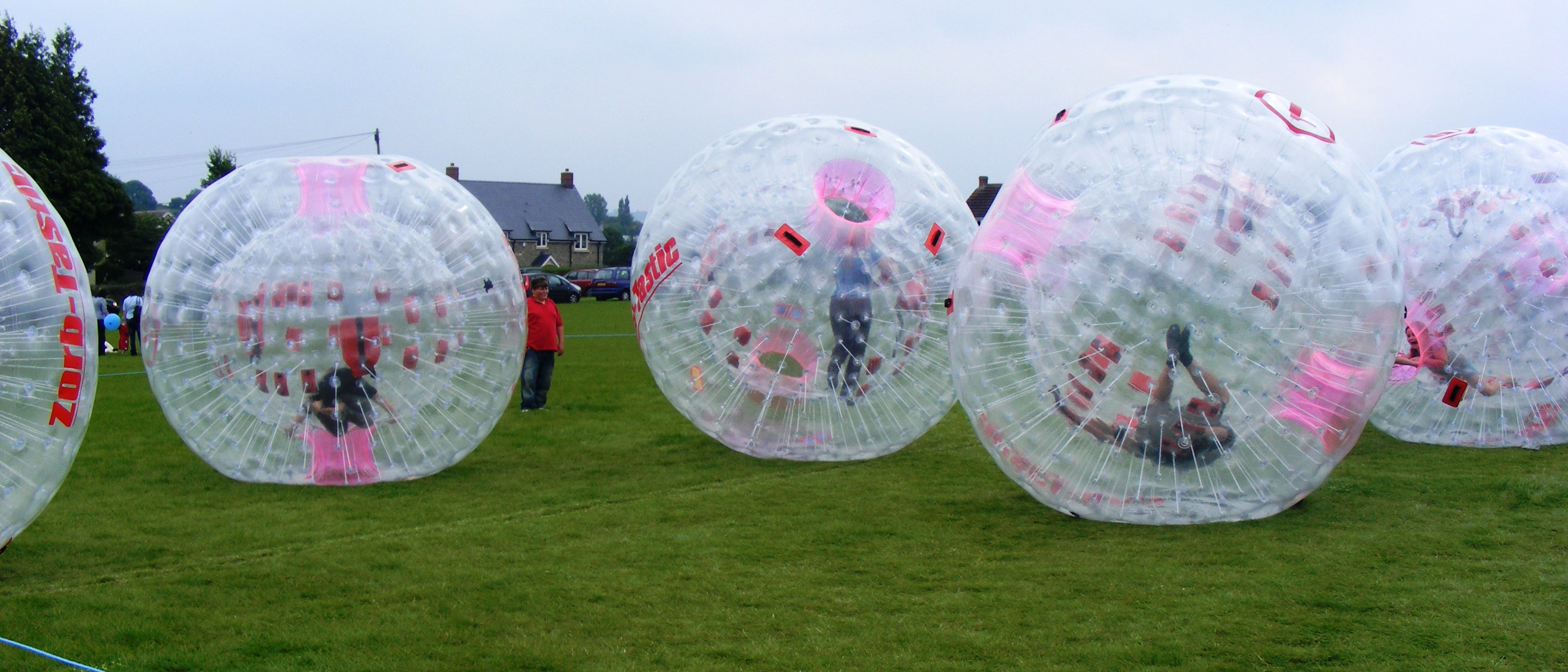
Zorbing at the Chew Stoke Harvest Home September 2010

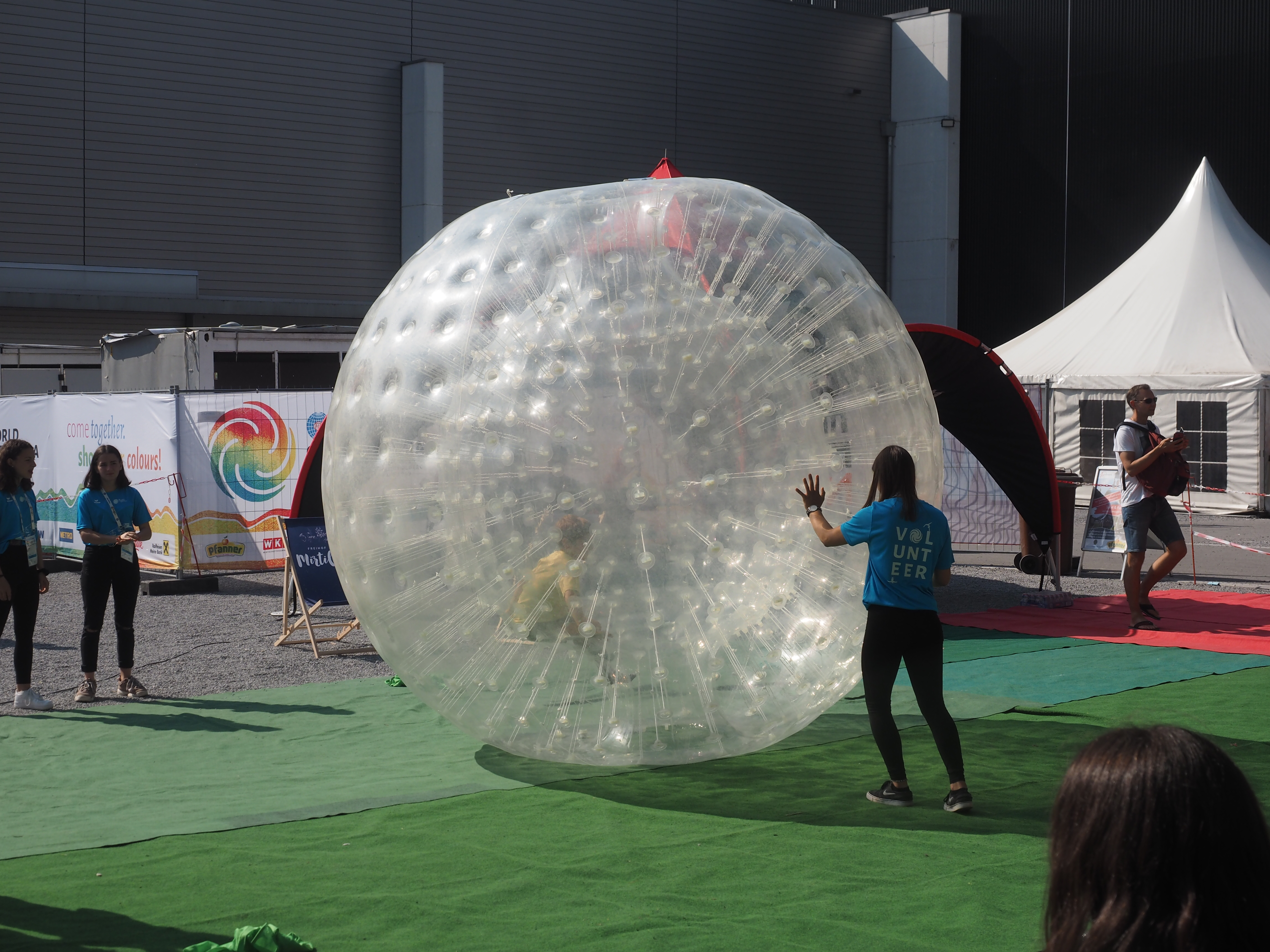
Zorbing at the World Gymnaestrada 2019 in Dornbirn, Vorarlberg, Austria

In the early 1980s, the Dangerous Sports Club constructed a giant sphere (reportedly 23 m or 75 ft across) with a gimbal arrangement supporting two deck chairs inside. This device was eventually cut up for scrap. Human spheres have been depicted in mass media since 1990 when the Gladiators event "Atlaspheres" first aired, albeit with steel balls.

In 1994, three investors created the firm ZORB Limited in New Zealand to create suitable balls for humans and to commercialize zorbing. Their business model was to develop the activity via a franchise system. Zorbing entered the Concise Oxford English Dictionary in 2001 in which it was defined as "a sport in which a participant is secured inside an inner capsule in a large, transparent ball which is then rolled along the ground or down hills."

== Construction ==
The orb is double-sectioned, with one ball inside the other with an air layer in between (unlike the water walking ball, which is usually a single thin-walled ball). This acts as a shock absorber for the rider. Orbs are lightweight and made of flexible plastic. Many orbs have straps to hold the rider in place, while others leave the rider free to walk the orb around or be tossed about freely by the rolling motion. A typical orb is about 3 m (10 ft) in diameter with an inner orb size of about 2 m (6 ft 7 in), leaving a 50–60 cm (20–24 in) air cushion around the riders. The plastic is approximately 0.8 mm (0.03 in) thick. The inner and outer orbs are connected by small nylon strings. Orbs have one or two tunnel-like entrances.

== Facilities ==
'Hill-rolling' and 'globe riding' are generic names for this activity which is practised in the United Kingdom, Australia, New Zealand, Sweden, Estonia, Canada, the Czech Republic, Poland, the Slovak Republic, Switzerland, Japan, Costa Rica, Kochi in India, Phuket in Thailand, and Slovenia. The United States formerly had several zorbing locations, including facilities in Wisconsin Dells, Wisconsin, Amesbury, Massachusetts, and Roundtop Mountain Resort in Lewisberry, Pennsylvania. However, as of 2025, the only zorbing facility in the United States is located at Gravity Park in Pigeon Forge, Tennessee. The longest track in the world is in Denmark, Western Australia at 570 m (1,870 ft) long.

== Records ==
The Guinness Book of World Records recognises five sphereing records:

- The longest distance travelled in a single roll is held by Steve Camp, of South Africa, who travelled 570 m (1,870 ft).
- The fastest sphereing ride is held by New Zealand's Keith Kolver, who reached a speed of 52 km/h (32 mph).
- The longest time spent zorbing is 4 hours, 11 minutes, and 33 seconds; the record is held by Siddhant Kulkarni, who also once held the fastest sphereing ride.
- The fastest 100 m (330 ft) in a zorb is 23.21 seconds; it is held by James Duggan, of Dunmanway, County Cork, Ireland, who broke the record during the Sam Maguire Harvest Festival on the September 8, 2019.

== Injuries and deaths ==
Although the cushioning design of the orbs prevents many serious injuries, light injuries such as bruises and grazes can often be sustained by colliding with objects or tripping while the orb is rolling down an incline. Even though severe injury is rare, there have been cases of children passing out due to lack of air and even some deaths.

In June 2009, a teacher died (and a pupil was severely injured) in the Czech Republic while zorbing.

In January 2013, at a ski resort in Dombay, Russia, a man died from a broken neck, and another was badly injured when the zorb he was in rolled out of control down a mountain, hitting rocks and eventually coming to a stop a kilometre away on a frozen lake. The incident was caught on camera and uploaded to the Internet. After the incident made international headlines, Russian authorities called for tougher safety laws.

In December 2021, some of the children injured or killed by the Hillcrest Primary School Tragedy were in zorbs that were launched into the air by a gust of wind.

In May 2023, a nine-year-old child was injured when a zorb was lifted into the air at Southport food and drink festival in the UK. Police were investigating footage of a dust devil, filmed in the area on the same day as the accident.

An Irish girl sustained a brain injury when a safety harness failed while she was zorbing. She was later awarded €1 million in December 2024.

== See also ==
- Water ball
- Hamster ball
- Bubble football
