= Pernille Sørensen (actress) =

Norwegian comedian, actress, and screenwriter

- Born: Bærum, Akershus, Norway
- Occupations: Comedian; actress; screenwriter
- Spouse: Dagfinn Lyngbø
- Children: 2

Pernille Sørensen is a Norwegian comedian, actress and screenwriter.

== Early life ==
Sørensen studied media and political science at the Norwegian University of Science and Technology (NTNU) in Trondheim and from 1998 to 2002, state and politics in the Middle East and North Africa at the University of Oslo.

== Career ==
From 2002 to 2006, Sørensen worked as an actress in the sketch series Melonas. In 2009, she starred in the children's film Knerten, portraying Lillebror's mother. In 2010 and 2011 respectively, she reprised her role in the two sequels Knerten gifter seg and Knerten i knipe. In 2011, she was the screenwriter of the television series Åse Tonight, in which she also starred. Since 2013, she has played one of the leading roles in the NRK series Side om side. In February 2015, she became one of the two permanent team members in the comedy show Nytt på nytt. She also works as a stand-up comedian.

== Personal life ==
Sørensen is married to fellow comedian Dagfinn Lyngbø and they have two children.

== Awards ==
- 2003: Komiprisen (Best newcomer)
- 2016: Komiprisen (Funniest of the year)
