= Johan Golden =

Norwegian comedian

Johan D. Golden
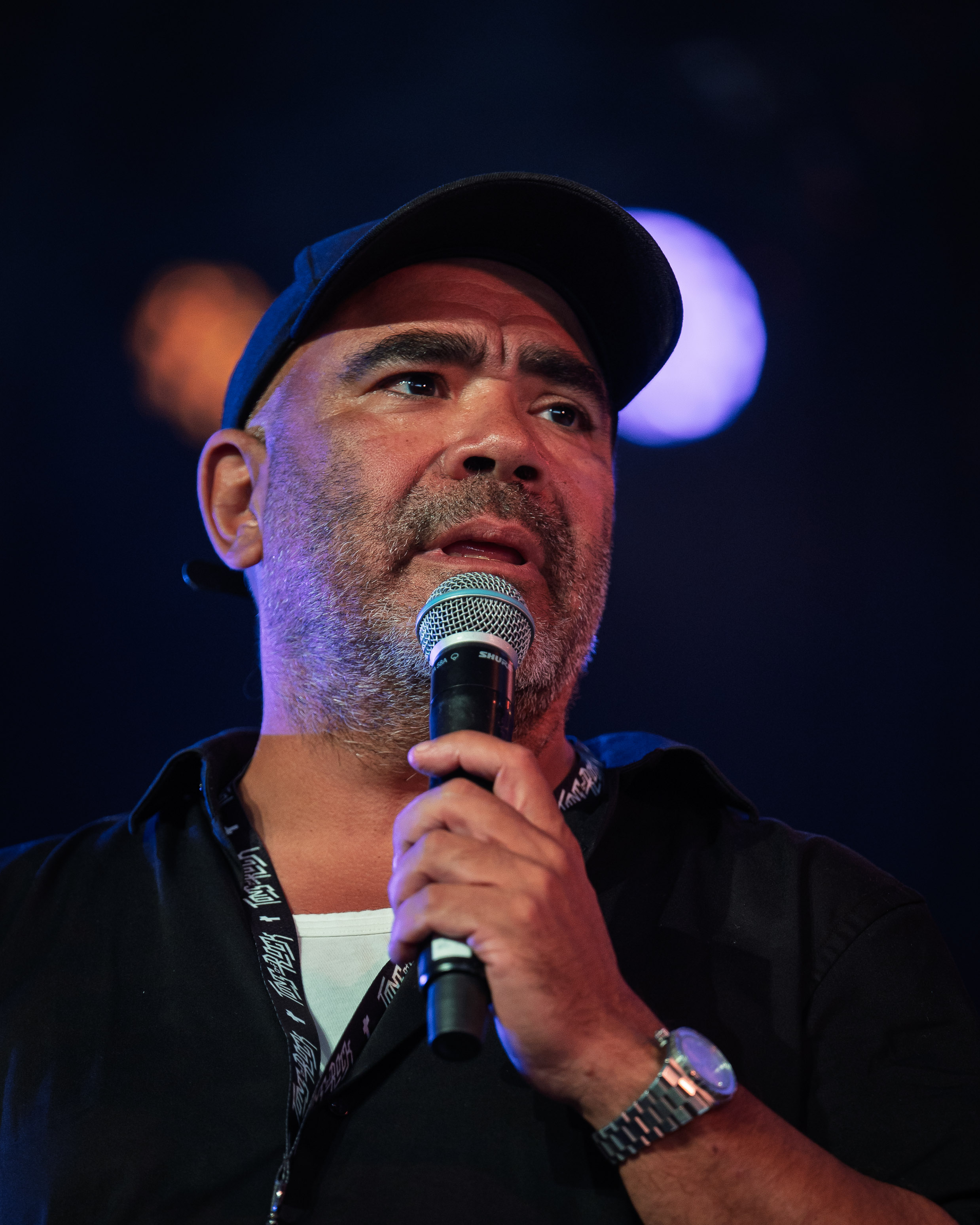
- Stand-up at Tons of Rock, Oslo, 2025; Photo: Birgit Fostervold
- Born: Johan Derussy Golden; 9 June 1974 (age 51); Guadeloupe, Caribbean
- Occupations: Comedian, musician, politician and radio/television presenter
- Spouse: Tuva Hølmebakk
- Children: Sebastian Golden (born 26.09.2008); Georg Golden (born 02.08.2013)

Johan Derussy Golden (born 9 June 1974) is a Norwegian comedian, musician, former politician and radio and television presenter. He became known through the radio programme XL, and later through the television programme En L.U.N. Aften med Golden og Antonsen on the now defunct channel Metropol.

Golden stood on Det Politiske Parti's list in Oslo during the 2001 Norwegian parliamentary election, and his personal slogan was "Your slave in parliament". He is also part of the band DDR.

Golden's father is from the Caribbean with ancestors from Africa. Golden is Norwegian and French citizen.

In winter 2006 he presented the programme Golden Goal on TV2 together with Henrik Elvestad. He worked for a while on the Kanal 24 programme Kommisjonen where he was the presenter together with Atle Antonsen. They later migrated to P4 with Misjonen, where they reassembled the same radio program, but with a new label.
