= Først & sist =

Norwegian television talk show

Først & sist ("First and Last") is a Norwegian talk show and was, at the time, the most-viewed talk show in the Nordic countries.

It was hosted by Fredrik Skavlan and aired on NRK in Norway. The show first aired in 1998 and was broadcast on Fridays until its finale in 2007, totalling 17 seasons. For the last two years of the show, it was also aired in Sweden.

The show won a Gullruten award in 2002. Following the end of Først og Sist, Fredrik Skavlan moved from Norway to Sweden, and became very popular. In 2009, NRK and SVT worked together to make a new version of the show. Now in two countries, and under the name Skavlan, which had been a common shorthand name for Først & sist.

Notable guests included Hans Blix, Pelé, Paulo Coelho, Liv Ullmann, Ronan Keating, Donald Trump, Robbie Williams, Leona Naess, Joe Cocker, Solomon Burke, Nicole Kidman, Desmond Tutu, Meat Loaf, Anastacia, the Pet Shop Boys, Marianne Faithfull, Jan Guillou, Isabella Rossellini, Kevin Warwick, Carola Häggkvist, Isabel Allende and Wyclef Jean, Barry Farber, Melanie C, Mika, Al Gore, Cary Fowler, Will Smith, Jada Smith.
