= Water ball =

Large inflatable sphere

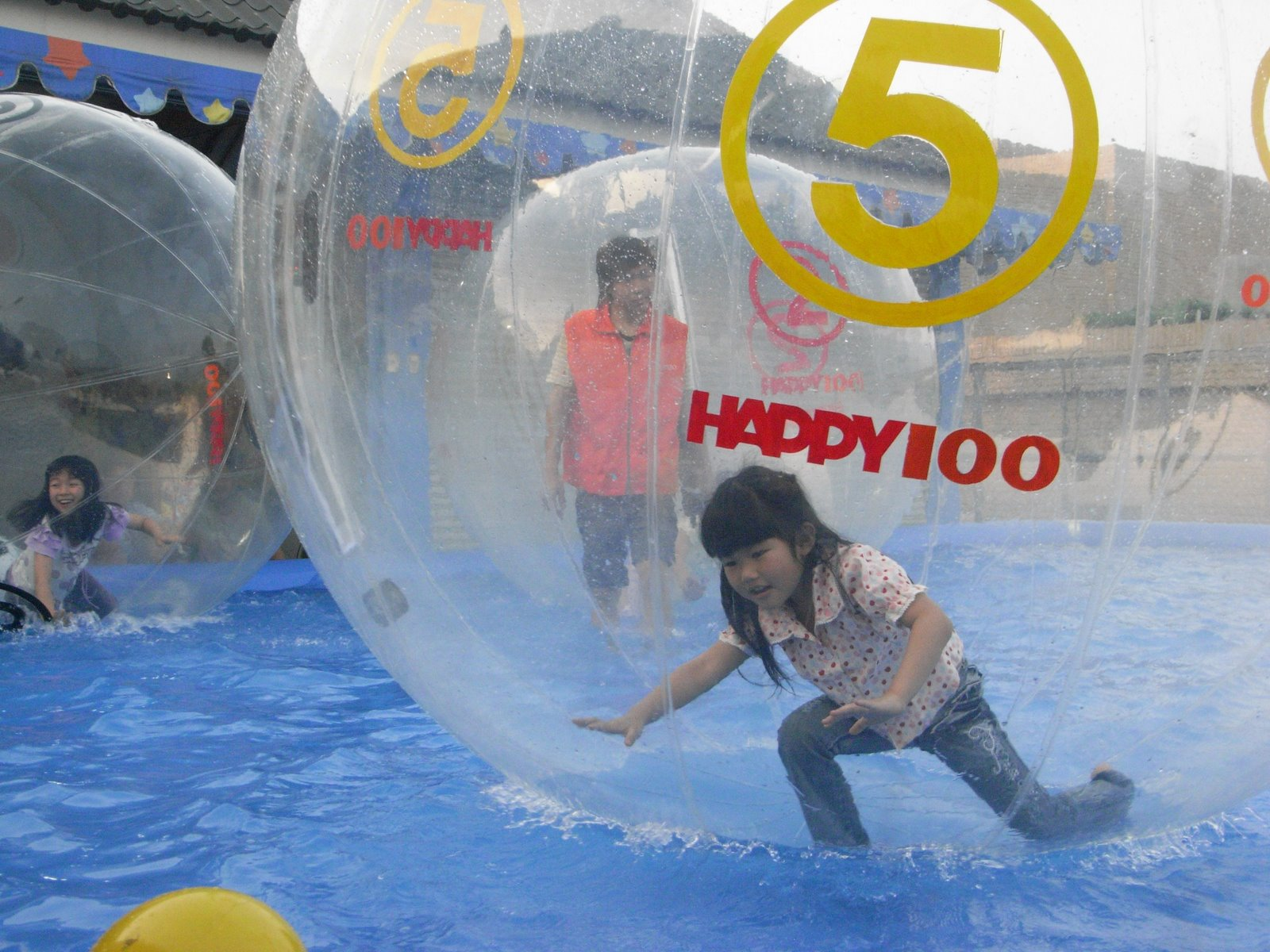
Children in water balls in Kaohsiung, Taiwan

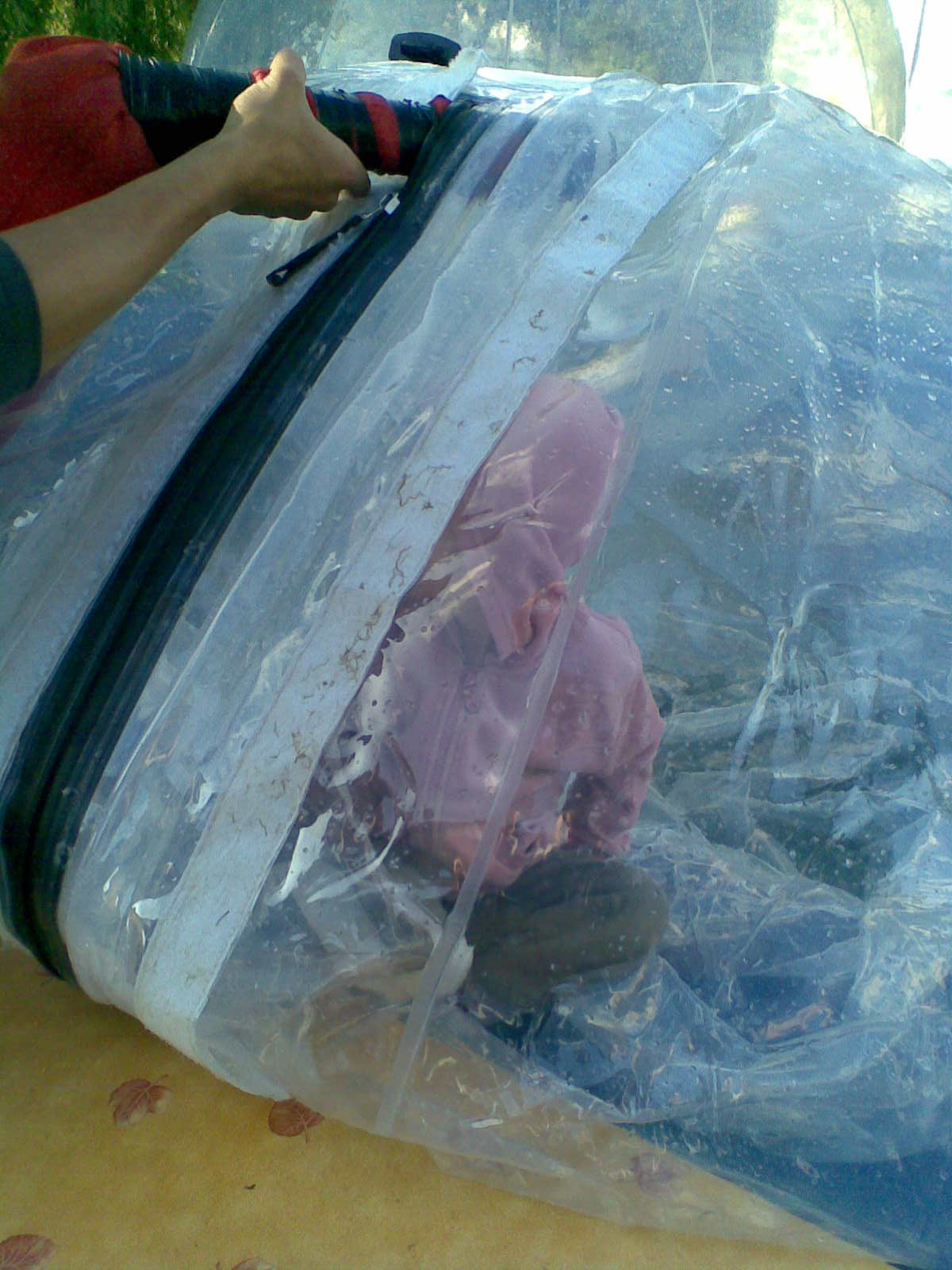
A water ball being inflated

A water ball or water walking ball is a large inflatable sphere that allows a person inside it to walk across the surface of a body of water. The giant ball is usually two metres in diameter and has a zippered entrance for entry and exit. The water ball is similar to the zorb, but it has only one layer and is designed for water travel rather than downhill rolling. In the United Kingdom, the balls have been used at swimming pools, marinas, and lakes in an effort to keep children fit, as well as for fitness and rehabilitation for people of all ages, including those with disabilities.

== History ==
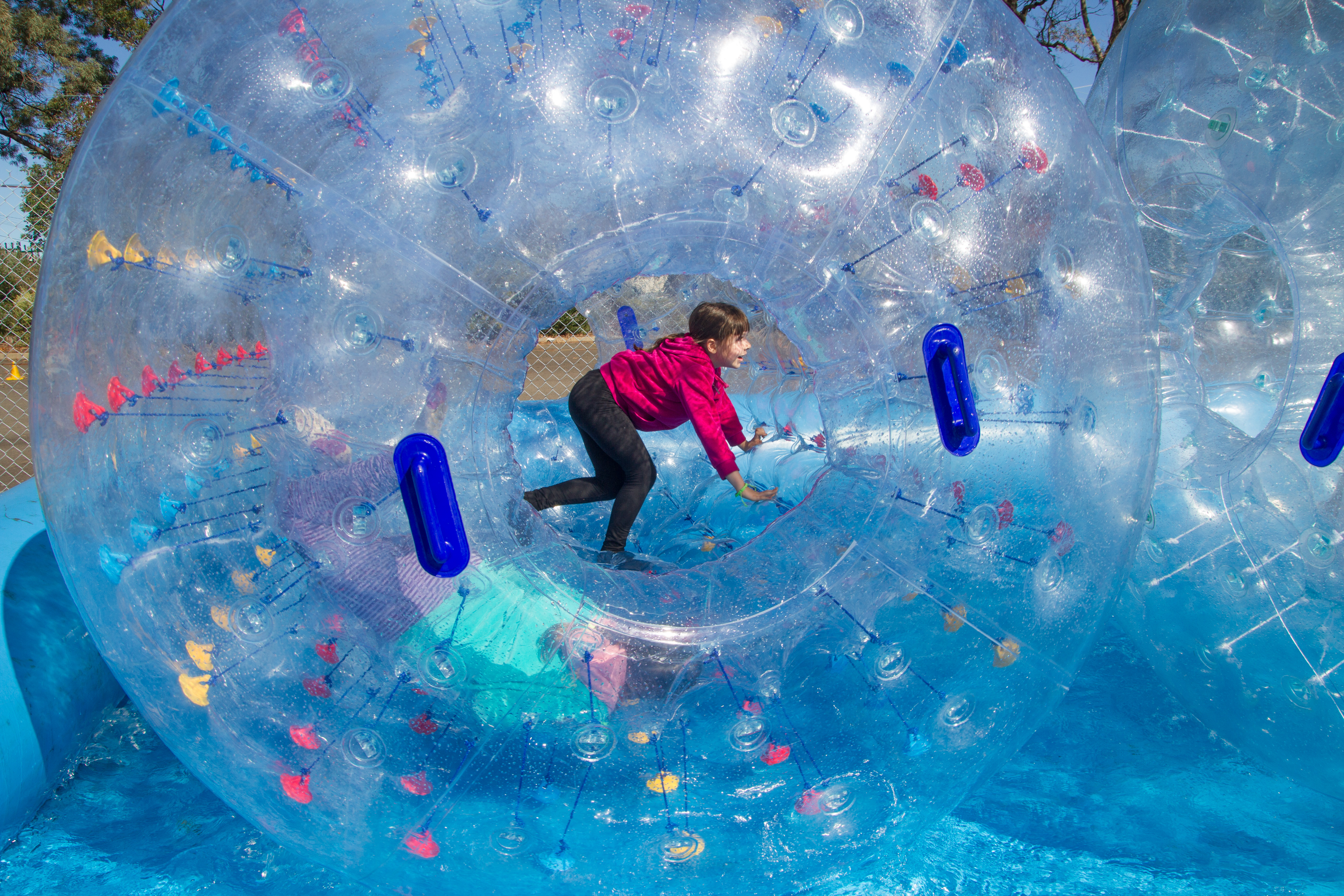
Water cylinder

Charles Blane Jones designed the first bubble for public distribution in 1998.

He was invited by a British reporter to visit London to demonstrate the ball on a lake. As soon as he attempted to walk across the water, he lost his balance and fell. The ball deflated and rapidly filled with icy water. He was saved from sinking below the surface when an assistant dragged the ball back to dry land using a safety line, an event witnessed by a crowd of tourists.

One of the first bubbles appeared in the film Diamonds Are Forever (1971) and in the music video for the Beach Boys song Getcha Back (1985).

=== Safety efforts ===
Patty Sullivan, President and CEO of Eli Bridge Company, began the effort to establish safety standards in collaboration with ASTM and Standardization News.

On April 1, 2011 the United States Government warned against using the balls, saying it "does not know of any safe way" to avoid the dangers of suffocation and drowning, among other hazards. Children were recorded fainting and crashing onto hard surfaces while inside the balls. The U.S. Consumer Product Safety Commission discouraged amusement park officials from allowing their use.

== Safety ==
The balls can be safely used in accordance with the safety standards described in ASTM F2374-20 Standard Practice For Design, Manufacture, Operation, And Maintenance Of Inflatable Amusement Devices, which includes:

"1.2.6 Stand-alone captured air inflatable devices that are designed to contain the patron within the elevated pressure space; are designed to be mobile during their intended use; or contain less than 270ft³ of air and do not include an anchoring or ballasting system. Examples include, but are not limited to: a water walking ball, a sports ball, a hamster ball, a hill-rolling ball."

For safe operation, the ball must be contained in a soft padded area of a pool with no hard surfaces, or, if in open water, it must be tethered to a ride operator or ride attendant.

The U.S. Consumer Product Safety Commission warned of the dangers of using the balls. The Commission noted two incidents involving water balls. In one, a child was found unresponsive after being inside the ball for a brief period of time. In the second incident, a person inside the ball suffered a fracture when the ball fell out of a shallow, above-ground pool onto hard ground.

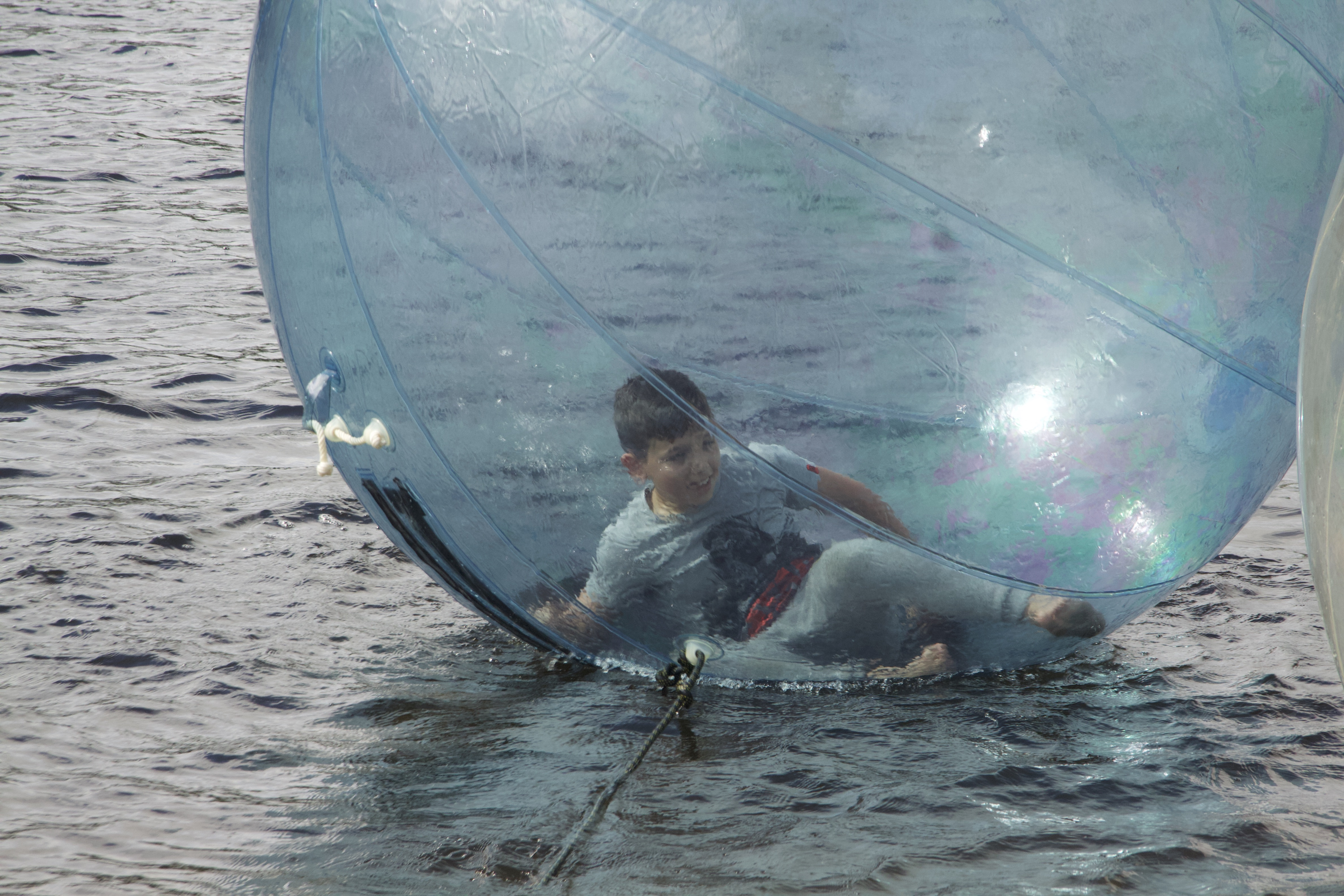
On a river in Ireland. When used on moving water, the balls must be secured with ropes.

== Construction ==
Many water balls are constructed from polyvinyl chloride (PVC), 0.8–1.0 mm thick. Thermoplastic polyurethanes (TPU) is the best choice for use in cold weather or on snow. Some water balls are made from a PVC–TPU mix. More expensive balls use 100% TPU. Balls are typically made in China and come in various sizes. A typical water ball stores flat, weighs 15 kilograms, and can be inflated in under a minute. Some models have hand grips on the outside, and the surface can be printed on.

== See also ==
- Zorbing
- Hamster ball
- List of inflatable manufactured goods
