= Team Antonsen =

- DVD 1 cover
- Created by: Atle Antonsen; Harald Eia; Bård Tufte Johansen; Kristopher Schau
- Starring: Atle Antonsen; Harald Eia; Bård Tufte Johansen; Kristopher Schau
- Country of origin: Norway
- No. of episodes: 16

Production
- Running time: 30 min

Original release
- Network: NRK1
- Release: 7 January – 26 February 2004

Team Antonsen is a Norwegian sketch comedy television program, which originally aired in spring 2004 on the Norwegian public channel NRK. The show consisted of four well-known comedians: Atle Antonsen, Harald Eia, Bård Tufte Johansen and Kristopher Schau performing various sketches.

The program also gave rise to a live performance in Oslo Spektrum in May 2004, called Team Antonsen Live: One Night Only. Originally only one performance was planned, but because the tickets were sold out, an additional performance was staged, Team Antonsen Live: One More Night Only.

The show typically made fun of spoken Nynorsk and Sami, as well as regional dialects from all over Norway—most commonly from Northern Norway and the cities of Bergen and Trondheim. Celebrities often appeared on the show—among others famous writer Anne Holt and accomplished singer Bertine Zetlitz. Team Antonsen had an average viewer-rating of over 700,000 viewers, a high figure for a late-night TV show in a country with 4.6 million people.

The show also spawned a stage comedy show called Team Antonsen Live: One Night Only, which was performed in Oslo Spektrum in May 2004. The comedians originally only planned one showing, but when tickets sold out they decided on performing one more, called Team Antonsen Live: One More Night Only.

The series won several Norwegian comedy awards, most notably the 2004 Gullruten for best humor show, Komiprisen for best show, as well as Komiprisen viewer's award for their sketch Hjemme hos Haakon Børde (At Home with Haakon Børde).

Team Eckbo was a continuation of Team Antonsen which replaced Schau with fellow Norwegian comedian Espen Eckbo. Eckbo took over Antonsen's role as the "leader" of the team. Antonsen, Schau, Tufte Johansen and Eia have performed together and with others in various configurations both before and after Team Antonsen, including the TV shows Midt i smørøyet, Lille lørdag, Åpen post, Storbynatt, Hjernevask, Tre brødre som ikke er brødre, Uti vår hage 1 and 2 and radio shows Verdensherredømme and Kommisjonen (on Kanal 24) / Misjonen (on P4).
