= Frank Aarebrot =

Norwegian political scientist (1947–2017)

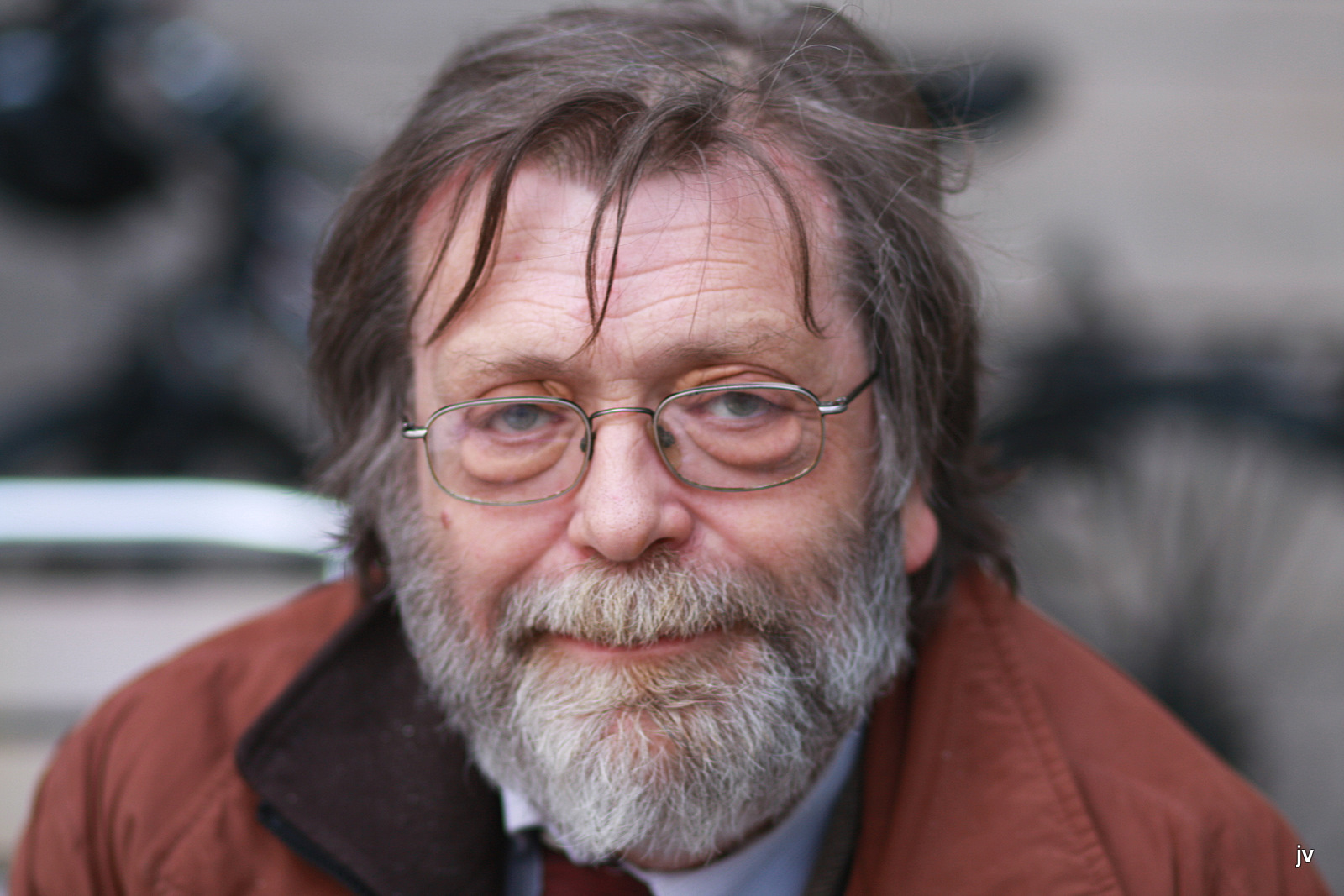
- Aarebrot in 2009
- Born: Frank Henrik Aarebrot; January 19, 1947; Bergen, Norway
- Died: September 9, 2017 (aged 70); Haukeland sykehus, Bergen, Norway
- Title: First amanuensis (1977-2001); Professor (2001-17)
- Spouse: Marian Flick (m. 1977; died 2017)

Academic background
- Education: University of Bergen; University of Michigan

Academic work
- Discipline: Professor of comparative politics
- Institutions: University of Bergen
- Main interests: Comparative politics, elections, political history, democracy development

Frank Henrik Aarebrot (19 January 1947 – 9 September 2017) was a Norwegian political scientist, political commentator, and professor of comparative politics. Among the most quoted and popular academics in the Norwegian press, he became better known during his later years for his televised "marathon lectures" and his recurring role in coverage of national and international elections on Norwegian television.

== Biography ==
=== Early life and education ===
Aarebrot was born in Bergen on 19 January 1947, the only child of civil engineer Knut Aarebrot (1911–84) and housewife Borgny Hansen (1912–2003), and grew up in the working class area of Kronstad outside Bergen. After finishing his examen artium in 1966, he enrolled at the University of Bergen, where he became the assistant of Stein Rokkan in 1969. After being invited to the United States by his aunt, Aarebrot studied at Yale University in 1969-1970 and the University of Michigan in 1972–74 as an exchange student, whilst also working as a substitute and guest lecturer in Bergen in-between. After completing his studies, Aarebot received his cand.polit.-degree in comparative politics in 1976, with minors in sociology and history.

Aarebrot became a member of the Norwegian Labour Party at young age, and voted for them in every election until his death. He later referred to his upbringing as one of the main reasons for his political position.

=== Academic career ===
From 1977 to his retirement in 2017, Aarebrot was employed by the Institute of Comparative Politics at the University of Bergen. In addition, he regularly lectured at Institut des Sciences Politiques and at the Humboldt University in Berlin. During his career, he also wrote sixty-nine books on the democratisation of Europe following the fall of the Berlin Wall. Aarebrot also holds one of the top spots in the rankings of most quoted academics in Norwegian media. On 19 January 2017, Aarebrot reached the age of retirement for academics in Norway, and held his final lecture on 24 April, an event that was televised nationally. While Aarebrot initially had several more planned, it would be his final televised lecture.

=== Media career ===
In the late 1980s, Aarebrot began working as a freelance observer for NRK, covering elections in Europe and the US. While covering the presidential elections of Romania in 1990, Aarebrot was infected with a skeletal disease that later resulted in amputation. Despite his, he continued working with the broadcaster until his death, and had a recurring role in coverage of elections until 2017.

Despite his education and academic background, Aarebrot became better known to modern audiences following his many appearances outside the news. In 2004, together with Norwegian comedian and sociologist Harald Eia and comedians Bård Tufte Johansen and Kristopher Schau, Aarebrot tried to prove Pierre Bourdieus critic of television, claiming that it's not an organ of information, but rather distraction: while Aarebrot and Bård Tufte Johansen led a normal-like TV-discussion about the ideas of Pierre Bourdieu, Kristopher Schau was licking dipmix off of the remaining parts of Aarebrots leg, meant to work as proof of Bordieus ideas, as the viewers most likely wouldn't remember the actual discussion.

Having studied in the United States and lived there for several years, Aarebrot was particularly interested in the politics of the country, and made frequent visits until his death. During the last decade of his career, he often featured in election coverage on Norwegian television, and wrote several articles on the presidential candidates and American politics in general. In one of his later, and more controversial articles, he compared then-candidate Donald Trump with Adolf Hitler, drawing parallels between the rhetoric and wording used by Trump during his campaign and by Hitler during his rise to power prior to 1933. When Trump later won the nomination, and subsequent election, Aarebrot referred to the result as "frightening" and expressed worry for the American democracy.

In 2014, Aarebrot gave a televised lecture on Norwegian history from 1814 to 2014 in celebration of the 200-year anniversary of the Constitution of Norway, the lecture lasting three-and-a-half hours, one minute for every year. Dubbed a "marathon lecture" by the media, it was immensely popular with viewers, resulting in two more such lectures, a three-and-a-half hour lecture on World War II in Norway in 2015, and a four-hour lecture on all forty-four Presidents of the United States and their elections in 2016. A fourth lecture, covering the 500-year history from the Reformation in 1517 until today was scheduled for October 2017 when Aarebrot suddenly died, six weeks before the lecture was to take place. He had also planned a fifth lecture for 2018, covering the hundred-year-history since the end of World War I. While most reviews and comments about the lectures were positive, some critics complained that Aarebrot presented a "dumbed-down" version of history, and also criticized him for failing to check some of his facts, such as the cause death of William Henry Harrison in 1841.

=== Personal life ===
Aarebrot married Dutch political scientist Marian Flick in 1977, and they remained married until his death. They had two children together.

After contracting an infection in his left leg while covering the presidential elections of Romania in 1990, Aarebrot was diagnosed with osteomyelitis, a disease of the bones in his leg, which was aggravated by lifelong smoking habit. In 2003, the leg was amputated below the knee, which Aarebrot himself called "a relief". He later used a prosthesis and occasionally crutches or a wheelchair.

==== Death ====
On 4 September 2017, Aarebrot was admitted to Haukeland sykehus in Bergen having suffered a heart attack. He had felt unwell during a return flight from London, and called his doctor after landing at Flesland Airport. The following day Aarebrot himself told media that he felt much better and would be having minor surgeries the following days to correct his heart issues. Five days later, on the evening of 9 September 2017, Aarebrot died at Haukeland from complications following his heart attack, aged 70. His death occurred less than two days before the 2017 Norwegian elections, which Aarebrot was scheduled to cover and comment on, and had made several pre-recorded videos for.

== Bibliography ==
- Frank Aarebrot and Pål Bakka: “Die Vergleichende Methode in der Politikwissenschaft“ i Dirk Berg-Schlosser and Ferdinand Müller-Rommel (red.): Vergleichende Politikwissenschaft, 4. utgave, (2006)
- Joakim Ekman, Henri Vogt, Frank Aarebrot and Sten Berglund: The Making Of The European Union: Foundations, Institutions and Future Trends (2006)
- Sten Berglund, Joakim Ekman and Frank Aarebrot (red.): The Handbook of political change in Eastern Europe 2. utgave (2004)
- Sten Berglund, Frank Aarebrot, Henri Vogt and Georgi Karasimeonov: Challenges to democracy : Eastern Europe ten years after the collapse of communism (2001)
- Frank Aarebrot and Terje Knutsen: Politics and Citizenship on the Eastern Baltic Seaboard. The structuring of Democratic Politics from North-West Russia to Poland (2000)
- Sten Berglund and Frank Aarebrot: The Political History of Eastern Europe in the 20th Century. The Struggle Between Dictatorship and Democracy (1997)
