= Jonna Støme =

Norwegian comedian (born 1978)

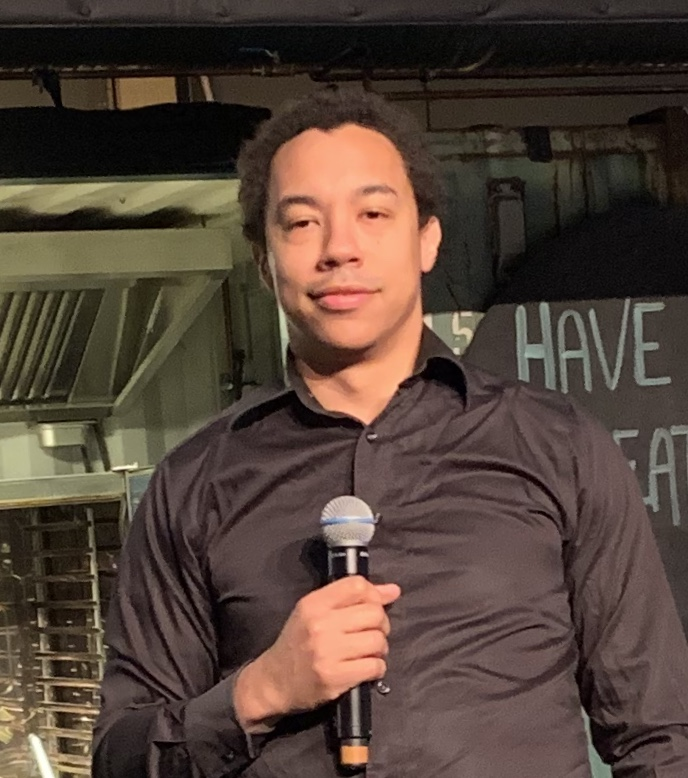

Jon Henrik "Jonna" Støme (born 11 October 1978 in the United States) is a Norwegian comedian, actor and television personality. He earned national recognition as a standup comedian from 2000 and has also been a producer, screenwriter and presenter of several television programs, including children's programs on the national broadcaster NRK.

== Background and career ==
He was born in the United States to an African-American mother, Ruth, and a Norwegian father, the engineer Stig Støme, who was an exchange student in the U.S. at the time. When he was an infant, his father left with him and moved back to Norway, without telling his mother. He was raised by his father in the wealthy borough of Røa in Oslo, and had no contact with his mother during his childhood and early adult life. The 2011 TV2 documentary Jonna får en mamma ("Jonna gets a mother") focused on his reunification with his mother and siblings in the United States 31 years later, and told his mother's story as the victim of parental child abduction.

Støme made his stage debut as a comedian in 2000, and gained early national recognition. He has worked with some of Norway's most prominent comedians such as Thomas Giertsen, Harald Eia, Linn Skåber, Atle Antonsen and Espen Eckbo. He earned acclaim for his take on racism and the multicultural society in the 2010 comedy performance "Fargerikt Faenskap" ("Colorful Shit"), and was nominated to the Comedy Prize (Komiprisen). In 2011 he collaborated with Thomas Giertsen and Espen Eckbo on "HumorGalla."

His television career includes shows such as Guru, Liga, Rikets Røst, Judas, Showbiz. He is well known as a presenter of children's television shows on the national broadcaster NRK. He has also published a book, Jonnas vitsebok ("Jonna's Joke Book"). He gave voice to the character Oscar in the Norwegian version of Shark Tale.
