= King Curling =

2011 film by Ole Endresen

- Directed by: Ole Endresen
- Written by: Ole Endresen and Atle Antonsen
- Produced by: Håkon Øverås
- Starring: Atle Antonsen, Jon Øigarden, Linn Skåber, Jan Sælid, Steinar Sagen
- Cinematography: Askild Edvardsen
- Edited by: Per-Erik Eriksen
- Music by: Stein Johan Grieg Halvorsen, Eyvind Andreas Skeie
- Production company: 4 1/2 Film
- Release date: 2011
- Country: Norway
- Language: Norwegian

King Curling (also King of Curling, Curling King; Norwegian: Kong Curling) is a 2011 Norwegian sports comedy film directed by Ole Endresen. Atle Antonsen stars as skip Truls Paulsen, a former curling champion now medicated for his dangerously obsessive behavior, who has to reunite his team 10 years after they disbanded in order to help his mentor Gordon get lifesaving medical treatment.

The name Truls Paulsen is a pun on Pål Trulsen, Olympic champion in curling. The curling scenes were shot in Håkons Hall, Lillehammer.

== Cast ==
Paulsen's team

- Atle Antonsen – Truls Paulsen
- Jon Øigarden – Marcus
- Jan Sælid – Espen
- Steinar Sagen – Flemming

Others

- Kåre Conradi – Stefan Ravndal
- Linn Skåber – Sigrid Paulsen
- Ane Dahl Torp – Trine Kristine
- Trond Fausa Aurvåg – Ornithologist
- Ingar Helge Gimle
- Bård Tufte Johansen – Knut
- Harald Eia – Arne
- Anne Marit Jacobsen – Jill
- Else Kåss Furuseth – Toril
- Egil Hegerberg
- Ulf Brunnberg
- Hans Morten Hansen
- Magnus Devold – Delivery man

== Reception ==
In Norway, several reviews were mediocre. VG and Dagbladet both gave a die throw of 4 (out of 6), whereas NRK P3's Filmpolitiet gave a 3 score.

Critic Brent McKnight compared the film to The Big Lebowski and "Wes Anderson's aesthetic," saying King Curling "has a lot of fun twisting and tinkering with every sports cliché in the book." British critic Mike McCahill also compared the film's sensibilities to Wes Anderson, as well as to the American offbeat sports comedy Dodgeball, citing "the bouffanted rival, the flowery commentary team (seen putting on their coats and locking up the studio before Truls attempts his final, seemingly impossible shot) and a mildly smirky attitude to its chosen minority pursuit: the film's best joke involves a curling administrator who refuses to answer any question from reporters that includes the diminutive term 'niche'."

It won the audience award for best feature film at the 2012 Cinequest Film Festival in the USA.
