= Anne Ryg =

Norwegian actress (born 1967)

- Born: 14 December 1967
- Occupation: Actor, nurse, audiobook narrator
- Spouse(s): Harald Eia
- Children: Helle Ryg Eia

Anne Ryg (born 14 December 1967) is a Norwegian actress. She is known for playing lawyer Karen Borg in the crime series Blind Goddess and the film Blessed Are Those Who Thirst.

== Career ==
Ryg studied at the Norwegian National Academy of Theatre and has worked in theatre, film and television. She has also narrated a number of audiobooks in Norwegian.

In 2019, she completed her nursing education and began working as a nurse alongside her acting career.

== Personal life ==
She is the half-sister of actress and comedian Hege Schøyen.

Ryg was married to comedian Harald Eia from 1998 to 2006. They have two daughters together, including actress Helle Ryg Eia.

== Select filmography ==
Year	Title	Role
1995	Lille Lørdag	Various roles
1996	Bot og bedring	Veslemøy
1997	Blind Goddess	Karen Borg
1997	Blessed Are Those Who Thirst	Karen Borg
2005	37 1/2	Janne
2006	Comrade Pedersen	Lise Tanner
2006	Uro	Department head
2019	Beware of Children	Stine
2022	Ammo	Kirsten
2023–2024	Power Play	Karin Stoltenberg
2025	In the Name of Love	Ebba
