= Hurra Torpedo =

Norwegian band

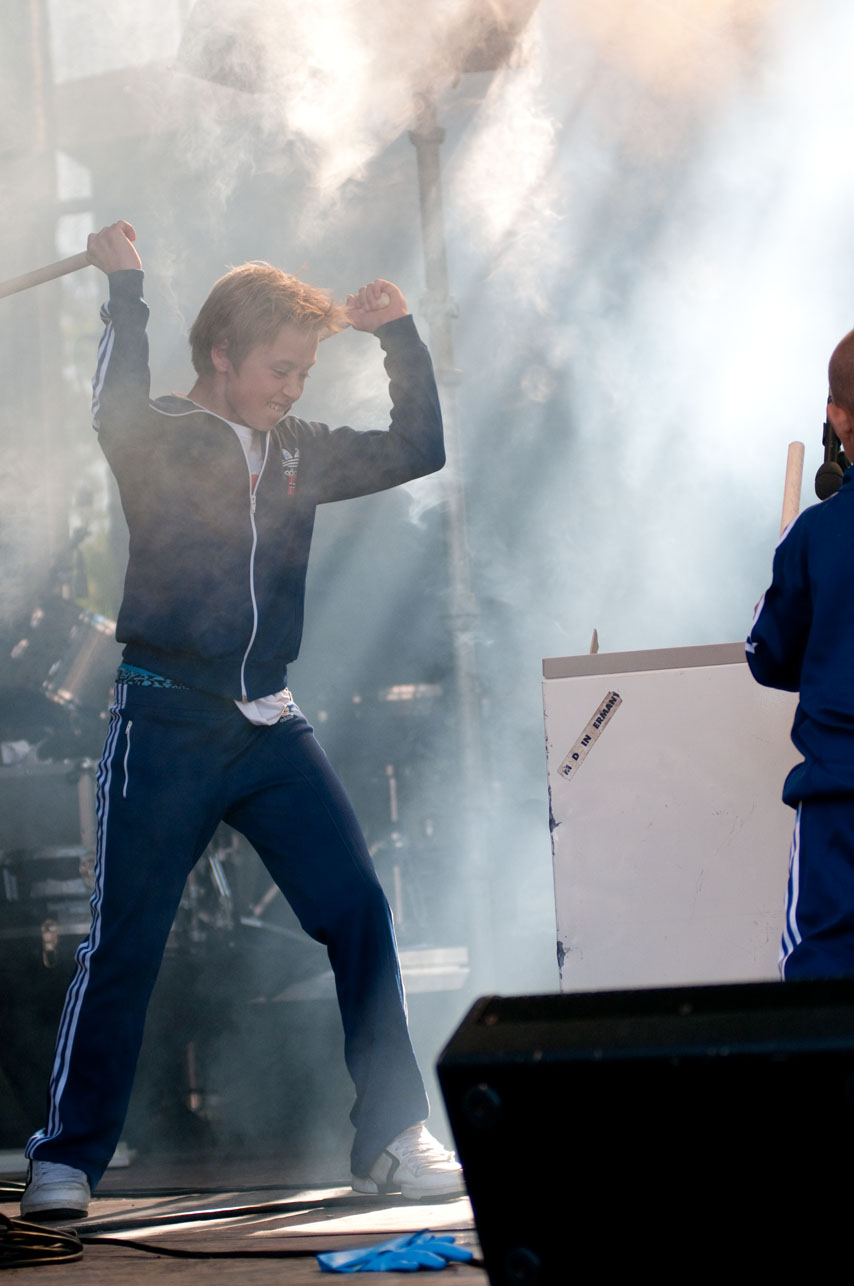
- MiniØya 2010

Background information
- Origin: Norway
- Genres: Rock, alternative rock, Industrial Music
- Years active: 1993–2012, 2016–
- Members: Egil Hegerberg; Kristopher Schau; Aslag Guttormsgaard

Hurra Torpedo is a band from Norway that plays songs using kitchen appliances alongside more traditional instruments. They were formed in the early nineties, are part of the artistic collective Duplex Records, and all members of the band also play in a variety of other bands in Norway.

During recent years Hurra Torpedo have had annual split- and reunion tours. The band struck international fame when a television performance of the 1983 Bonnie Tyler power ballad "Total Eclipse of the Heart", using kitchen appliances for percussion, spread as an internet meme. The clip, from a Norwegian comedy-variety show called Lille lørdag ("Little Saturday") (aired on Wednesdays - "the Little Saturday" in the Scandinavian week), was filmed in 1995. In early 2005 the clip was uploaded to the internet.

In the clip, the band, dressed in ill-fitting jogging suits, play on a stage surrounded by various kitchen appliances, such as electric kitchen stoves and chest-freezers. Frontman Hegerberg plays guitar and sings in a deliberately off-key monotone and with a strong Norwegian accent, Schau drums by hitting a stove with a stick and slamming the door of a chest-freezer, while Guttormsgaard adds backing vocals, and at the climax smashes the top of an electrical stove with a cement press, more or less, to the beat of the song.

In October/November 2005 they became part of a viral ad campaign by going on a coast to coast tour in the U.S. that was paid for by Ford in order to promote the Ford Fusion car. As part of the ad campaign, a mockumentary movie called "The Crushing Blow" was being made, said to have been directed by the "character" Pip Simon who is played by the actress Tara Copeland while in reality it was directed by Joey Garfield.

By the end of November 2005 a clip from The Crushing Blow was viewed more than 500,000 times in a couple of days from the web site iFilm, and some of the clips spread around blog sites.

The band played several gigs in Norway the first half of 2006, and the Garorock festival in Marmande, France, with approximately 5000 in the audience.

Hurra Torpedo had two showcases at the 2006 South by Southwest festival, and in June they went on new US Tour, starting in Boston, ending in San Francisco three weeks later. Along this tour they played to an enthused audience at the Wakarusa Music and Camping Festival in Lawrence, Kansas. This tour has no connection with Ford.

In 2011, the band recorded the soundtrack for Christmas advertising campaign of Czech household appliance retailer Okay.

== Members ==
- Egil Hegerberg - bass guitar, guitar, vocals
- Kristopher Schau - percussion, backing vocals
- Aslag Guttormsgaard - percussion, guitar, vocals

== Discography ==
- To håndfaste burgere - cassette (Duplex Records 1992)
- Stockholm - 7" vinyl (Duplex Records 1995)
- Total Eclipse of the Heart - CD (Duplex Records 2005)
- Kollossus of Makedonia - CD (Duplex Records 2006)
- World Tour 2010 – Live at Rockefeller Music Hall - CD and DVD (Grappa 2010)
- We're Not Dead (We Just Smell Bad) - Digital single (Duplex Records 2016)
- We Fuck You with Music - Digital single (Duplex Records 2016)
- Nehéz Kell Érteni - Digital single (Duplex Records 2016)
