= Åpen Post =

Norwegian sketch comedy TV show

- Created by: Harald Eia; Bård Tufte Johansen
- Starring: Harald Eia; Bård Tufte Johansen; Robert Gustafsson
- Country of origin: Norway

Original release
- Network: NRK1
- Release: 1998 – 2002

Åpen Post was a Norwegian sketch comedy television program that ran on the Norwegian state channel NRK from 1998 till 2002. It was created and hosted by Harald Eia and Bård Tufte Johansen. The show started in a talk show format with interviews and guests but later leaned more towards being a pure sketch show. The show became one of Norway's most popular TV productions, though it was the center of criticism due to controversial episodes such as Bård Tuft Johansens "Chicken stunt", involving the then Norwegian Labour Party leader Thorbjørn Jagland.

After the show was taken off the air, Harald Eia and Bård Tufte Johansen continued to create new successful NRK shows such as Uti vår hage (2003), Team Antonsen (2004), Tre brødre som ikke er brødre (2005), Ut i vår hage 2 (2008) and Storbynatt (2010).
