= One Night (Norwegian TV series) =

- Written by: Øystein Karlsen; Kristopher Schau
- Directed by: Øystein Karlsen (9 episodes); Agnes Kittelsen (1 episode)
- Country of origin: Norway
- Original languages: Norwegian and Swedish (original version); English (international version)
- No. of series: 1
- No. of episodes: 10

Production
- Producer: Anders Tangen

Original release
- Network: NRK
- Release: 2 February 2018

One Night (Norwegian: En natt) is a Norwegian drama TV series about two people meeting for the first time on a blind date, and follows them to the end of the date. The series is written by Øystein Karlsen and Kristopher Schau based on an idea by Zak Shaikh and Steve Waverly.

The series was recorded simultaneously in a Norwegian/Swedish version and an English version. MyAnna Buring plays Elizabeth in both versions, speaking Swedish in the original version. The character Jonas is played by Anders Baasmo Christiansen in Norwegian and Gísli Örn Garðarsson in English.

It is shot in Oslo, and follows the two from their meetup near Birkelunden, down Grünerløkka and along the Akerselva river down to Grønland and Sørenga, and ends at the churchyard near Gamlebyen Church.
