= Espen Eckbo =

Norwegian actor, writer and comedian

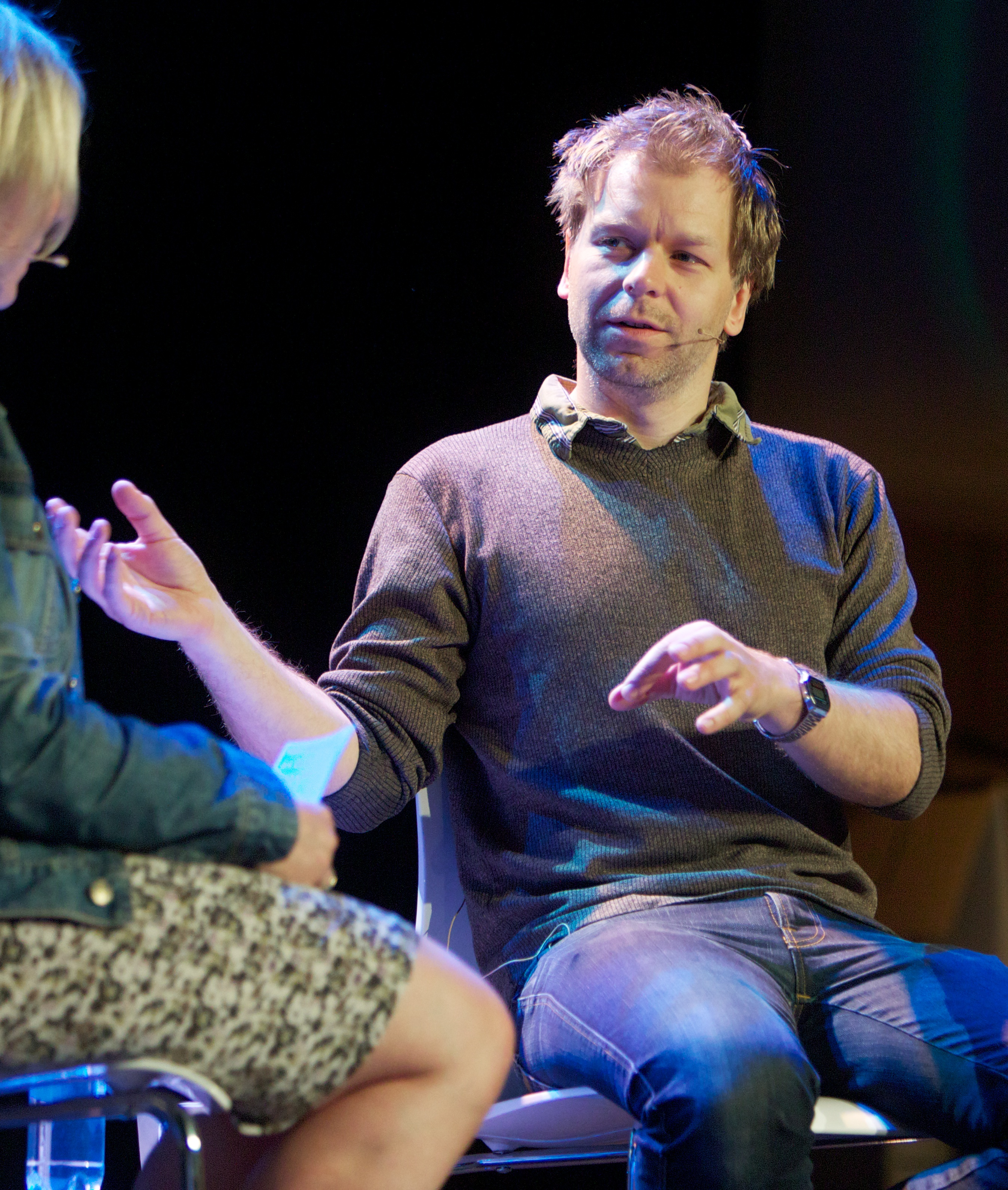
- Espen Eckbo i 2011
- Born: 22 April 1973

Espen Andersen Eckbo (born 22 April 1973) is a Norwegian actor, writer and comedian.

He was born in Oslo, and grew up in Bestum. Eckbo has no formal training as an actor, but has a background as a law student for two years at the University of Oslo.

Internationally, he is best recognised for having helped to create the fictional boy band Boyzvoice and the subsequent mockumentary Get Ready to be Boyzvoiced (2000) together with Henrik Elvestad. Eckbo first appeared on Norwegian television in 1998, when he got his own segment in the news satire program Mandagsklubben, where he would portray a different character every week in a mock documentary style. These segments were also the launching pad for Boyzvoice. The short-lived show I kveld, with Thomas Giertsen, and Rebekka Strandenes followed in 1999.

He later made fun of the reality TV phenomenon in the mock reality show Nissene på låven (2001, together with Kristian Ødegård). This show also introduced two of his most familiar characters, Asbjørn Brekke and Rhino Thue. By that time, Eckbo had established the production company Seefood together with Kristian Ødegård.

Eckbo and his characters has also featured in the game show TV2-nøttene which was presented by Ødegård and aired during Christmas and Easter, and is a parody of the Norwegian Broadcasting Corporation programs Julenøtter and Påskenøtter. His characters also featured in Henrik Elvestad's mock talk show Tonight med Timothy Dale (2003) and Eckbo's show Tett på tre (2008). He had segments in Otto Jespersen's Rikets røst. In 2006 Eckbo created the live show Team Eckbo together with Atle Antonsen, Harald Eia and Bård Tufte Johansen.
