= Durek Verrett =

American alternative therapist (born 1974)

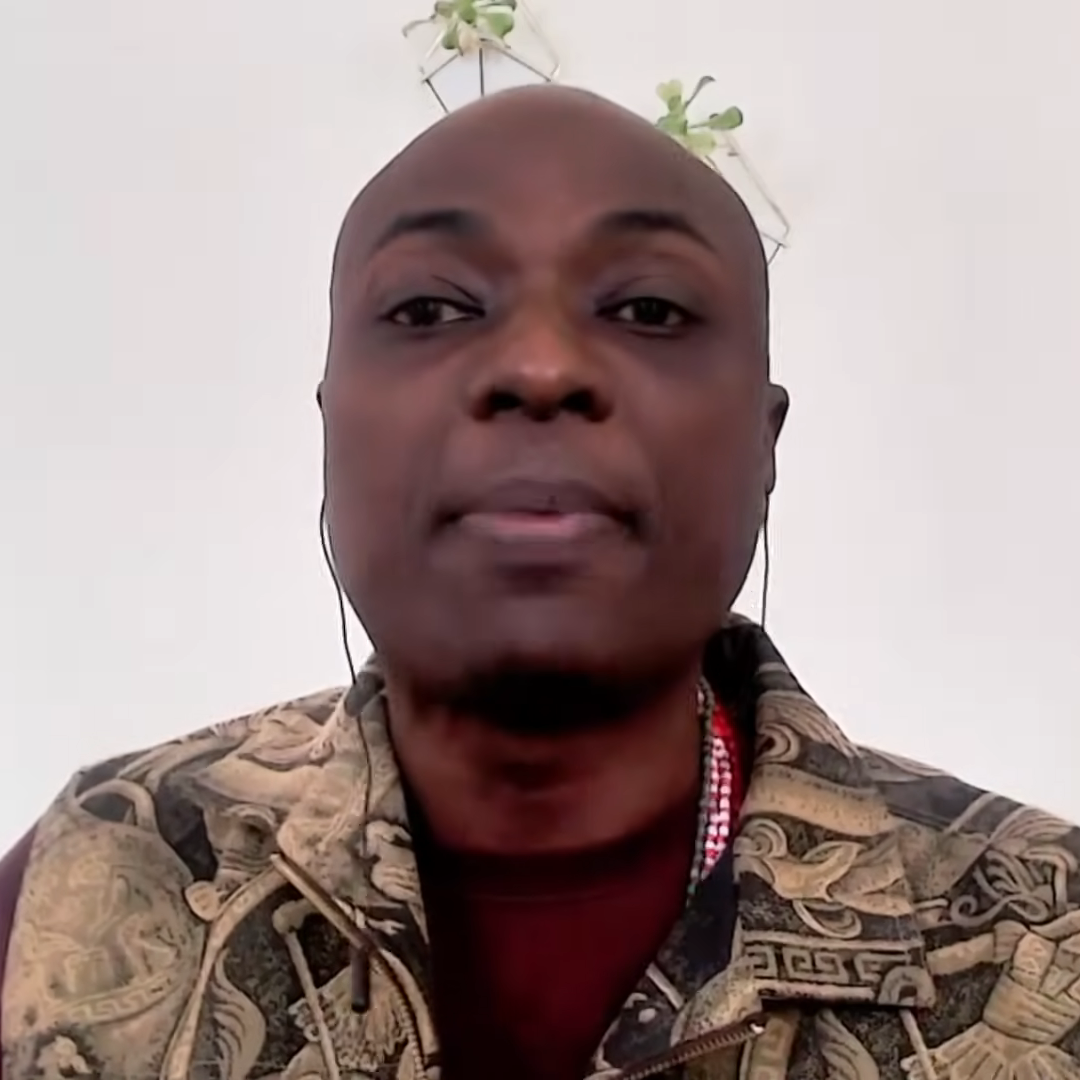
- Verrett in 2024
- Born: Derek David Verrett; November 17, 1974 (age 52); Sacramento, California, U.S.
- Occupation: Alternative therapist
- Spouse(s): Zaneta Marzalkova (m. 2005; div. 2009) Princess Märtha Louise of Norway (m. 2024)
- Partner: Hank Greenberg (2007–2015)
- Website: shamandurek.com

Durek Verrett (born Derek David Verrett; November 17, 1974) is an American self-professed shaman practicing neoshamanism who, since 2024, has been married to Princess Märtha Louise of Norway. He has been widely described by Norwegian media as a con man and conspiracy theorist.

Verrett promotes New Age–influenced practices and his claims have been widely criticized as pseudoscientific, including that children get cancer because they want it, that chemotherapy is ineffective and financially motivated, and that casual sex attracts subterranean spirits. He identifies as a reptilian, regards 5G technology as a conspiracy, and claims to have known about the September 11 attacks two years before they happened, but chose not to intervene.

Verrett's relationship with the princess and his statements have drawn widespread criticism in Norway, such that she relinquished her royal duties to separate their commercial activities from the monarchy. Although Verrett is a member by marriage of the Norwegian royal family, he is not royal and holds no title.

Controversies surrounding Märtha Louise and Verrett, along with the Marius Borg Høiby affair, have been linked to a significant decline in public support for the Norwegian monarchy.

== Background ==
Durek Verrett was born Derek David Verrett on November 17, 1974, in Sacramento, California, and grew up in Foster City. He legally changed his name to Durek Verrett in 2014. Much of the information about his origins or childhood is uncertain.

His parents divorced when he was three, and he lived with his father, David Benjamin Verrett (1929–2017), and his stepmother.

Verrett's ancestors were enslaved in the New Orleans area at least since the early 19th century, where they continued to live and where Verrett's father was born. Durek Verrett's great-uncle was the jazz guitarist Harrison Verrett, a brother-in-law of Fats Domino, and his aunt was the opera singer Shirley Verrett, whom he said encouraged him to explore his spirituality. In the mid 20th century Verrett's grandparents moved to California with their children.

Verrett has four siblings, as reported by Norwegian news outlets, including his one-year-older sister Angelina Verrett and his brother, Brandon Clark, the others being estranged half-sisters. Suffering from renal failure at the age of 28, he said about his sister Angelina that she saved his life, after she donated him one of her kidneys [in 2012] and he has always been very close to her and her three children. In August 2026, Durek underwent a second kidney transplant in Oslo.

== Career ==
Verrett dropped out of high school. Before he began calling himself a shaman, Verrett worked as a model and an actor.

In 2019, Verrett released a book titled Spirit Hacking which was set to be published in Norway. However, major publisher Cappelen Damm dropped the book a week prior to its scheduled publication over concerns about its content. The book was later released by a small publisher. In the book, Verrett advocates numerous "absurd medical theories".

Verrett has stated that his "true mission is to bring the ancient practice of shamanism to the mainstream, helping people to 'get lit' by cultivating love and acceptance of themselves and others."

== Claims ==
In a 2019 interview to Vanity Fair, Verrett claimed that his father was a wealthy architect with a private plane and domestic servants. However, in an interview to Se og Hør, his mother Sheilah G. Farmer (1943–2026), who went by the alias Veruschka Urquhart, claimed that Verrett's family was not as wealthy as he has claimed. His sister Angelina has defended Verrett and described their upbringing as fine. Verrett has claimed that his mother was of Norwegian-West Indian descent, although he has alternately described her as being of Native American heritage, and he has also claimed "she was white." He has sometimes claimed that his father was of African and Haitian origin, while at other times stating his father was "Native American Blackfoot Indian".

At age 27, Verrett claims he had a near-death experience which was a pivotal "rite of passage to become a shaman". In 2018, Verrett stated in multiple interviews that his near-death experience happened in Los Angeles, California, where a friend drove him to a local hospital. However, since 2019, Verrett has changed the story, stating that it occurred in a Belize jungle while he was with a medicine woman, and that he was transported to a hospital there via ambulance. In all versions of the story, Verrett claims he underwent emergency tracheotomy (surgical opening of the throat) and sternotomy (surgical opening of the chest).

Verrett has claimed to have been initiated spiritually by an American woman who calls herself "Princess Susana von Radić of Croatia" (who is described by the Icelandic atheist association Vantrú as "a fraud who claims to be a princess").

On his personal website from 2011 to 2020 he claimed to be a third-generation shaman. Since 2020, he changed his claim and began describing himself as a sixth-generation shaman.

In 2018 and 2019, Verrett claimed that he worked at Shamir Medical Center in Israel for several months during 1998, where he said he treated children for cancer using shamanistic methods. However, in 2019, the hospital's Human Resources department stated that Verrett never worked at the institution.

In his 2019 book Spirit Hacking Verrett claims children get cancer because they want it, and suggests that chemotherapy does not work and is only given to cancer patients because the doctors make money from it. He wrote in the book that casual sex attracts subterranean spirits that make an impression on the inside of women's vaginas; he also sells exercises to "clean out" said vaginas.

In 2019, Verrett claimed that he had knowledge of the September 11 attacks two years before they happened, but that he chose not to intervene because he believes that everyone must "accept their destiny".

In 2021, Verrett stated that he considers himself to be a reptilian, and asserted that, "I'm a hybrid species of reptilian and Andromeda, and I also hold the energies of the ancient spirits from the old world. There have been lies told about our species that I want to address. We are a cluster of beings, that means that we've come here to create structures that help people to come into liberation. Reptilians are here to shake up the system in a big way."

Verrett has also claimed that he has risen from the dead and is a reincarnated Pharaoh from Egypt. Verrett says that he can "turn atoms" and reduce age. Verrett has stated that he considers the 5G technology to be a conspiracy by "those who enslave the planet".

In 2022, Aftenposten journalist Ingeborg Senneset wrote an open letter to Verrett, in which she addressed his habit of sending her voice messages, such as "Hey, my love" on Instagram and telling her that the "Illuminati" is real and that celebrities and powerful politicians corroborate his claims. Verrett subsequently blocked Senneset when she asked critical questions about his Illuminati claims.

Verrett claimed he was criticized of his marriage to Märtha Louise's because "people don't want a black man in the royal family." Verrett said, "I have never experienced so much racism as when I came to Norway." He further said that he is misunderstood, comparing himself to "geniuses [like] Albert Einstein, Thomas Edison, the Wright brothers and Helen Keller".

Early in 2023, Verrett had claimed that Märtha Louise's late ex-husband, Ari Behn, who died by suicide in 2019, had contacted him through mediumship and asked him to greet Märtha Louise's children.

In December 2023, Verrett posted a controversial video on Instagram in which he claimed that demonic beings can inhabit children and torment them. Therefore, he advised parents to speak directly and loudly at troubled, aggressive, and acting-out children, commanding the dark spirits within them to come "into the light". Many observers consider Verrett's parenting advice to be a harmful encouragement of exorcism.

Verrett claimed that when he was a child his mother foresaw him marrying a Norwegian princess, however, his mother publicly denied this as a fake story that Verrett created himself.

=== Reactions ===
Verrett has been characterized by Norwegian media and other critics as a conman and a conspiracy theorist, and his statements on various topics have been widely criticized and ridiculed in Norway.

Cancer experts called Verrett's views on cancer "dangerous". Major newspaper Dagbladet described his 2019 Spirit Hacking book as "the ravings of a lunatic". Verdens Gang called the book "nonsense, garbage and dirty talk", and said it is an unoriginal "rehash of the standard repertoire of the most cynical part of the alternative [i.e. New Age] culture".

According to extremism researcher John Færseth, Verrett's ideas about being a reptilian are based on the Reptilian conspiracy theory advocated by British conspiracy theorist author David Icke.

The former Prime Minister of Norway Erna Solberg described Verrett's views as "very strange" and "not based on facts", and said that "the ideas that he promotes are something that we combat as conspiracy theories." Solberg further said the criticism of Verrett is reasonable. State Secretary of the Norwegian Ministry of Health and Care Services, Ole Henrik Krat Bjørkholt, described Verrett as "an unscrupulous and dangerous charlatan" who engages in fraud. In 2023, Norwegian Prime Minister Jonas Gahr Støre strongly condemned Verrett, calling his statements on child rearing "dangerous".

Verrett's claims of experiencing racism in Norway have been criticized, with former Norwegian cabinet minister Abid Raja (of Pakistani descent) accusing Verrett of "playing the race card" to distract from the criticism of his conspiracy theories and "dangerous" views. Comedian Jonna Støme, himself of African American descent, said that Verrett's claims undermine the real fight against racism and that people in Norway react negatively to Verrett because "he is a conman who says horrible things."

==== Wikipedia ====
On behalf of the princess and her shaman, "reputation manager" Elden complained about the inclusion of quotations from former Norwegian Prime Minister Erna Solberg that appear in the Wikipedia article about Verrett, in which she criticised Verrett for promoting "strange ideas" linked to conspiracy theories. Lawyer and media law expert Jon Wessel-Aas publicly stated that it is futile to demand the removal of a correct quotation from a public statement by a prime minister.

The political editor of Nettavisen, Erik Stephansen, wrote that "the revelation of Verrett's repeated attempts to change or remove unfavorable information from Wikipedia" is one of the most striking examples of attempts to hide unfortunate traces from the "con artist shaman's" past life.

== Legal problems ==
In 1991, Verrett was convicted of felony arson and trespassing and sentenced to five years of imprisonment in California after he illegally organized a party in an unoccupied house that was set on fire and burned to the ground. Verrett has stated that he served one year in prison before being released on parole.

In July 2022, Verrett advertised and sold a medallion that he claimed cures COVID-19. The Norwegian Consumer Ombudsman declared Verrett's undocumented claims to be a violation of Norwegian law. As a result, in 2023, Verrett ceased selling that product and began selling another medallion for over 2,000 Norwegian kroner that he claims can cure dogs of various ailments, which has been criticized by the Norwegian Veterinary Association as not based on science.

== Personal life ==
In 2005, Verrett married Zaneta Marzalkova, a Los Angeles resident of Czech nationality, when she was 21 years old. Verrett claimed that Marzalkova used him to obtain a green card and reported her to immigration authorities in 2008. She filed for divorce afterward, and they were divorced in 2009.

From 2007 to 2015, Verrett was engaged to Hank Greenberg, a masseur who was also his business partner. In 2012, Verrett and Greenberg started an Indiegogo crowdfunding page to raise money for Verrett's kidney transplant in which they stated that Verrett is HIV positive. In interviews given to Se og Hør in 2019, Greenberg described Verrett's true nature as manipulative and dangerous, and stated that Verrett has a "brainwashed" cult of followers where "his word is law."

For several years between 2012 and 2017, Verrett lived periodically with his then-manager Tiana Griego, who said in an interview with Se og Hør, "Durek controlled my whole life. It was as if he became jealous of anything that stole his attention. I was not allowed to start a serious romantic relationship or raise my son. It was all about Durek."

Although Verrett publicly identified as gay prior to 2019, Vanity Fair wrote about him identifying as bisexual since meeting Norway's Princess Märtha Louise and their activities to promote his brand of new age shamanism in celebrity circles.

=== Upbringing dispute ===
Durek Verrett has been involved in public disputes with his mother, Veruschka Urquhart, and one of his sisters, who have contradicted his claims about a wealthy upbringing. The conflict intensified after his mother gave multiple interviews to the Norwegian magazine Se og Hør, describing him in negative terms. In a subsequent interview with the newspaper Verdens Gang (VG), Verrett and Princess Märtha Louise accused Se og Hør of orchestrating a paid "smear campaign", with VG's reporting also confirming that Urquhart was under contract with the magazine. Se og Hør denied the allegations and cited public interest. In 2024, Verrett threatened legal action against his mother and his sister to halt their statements.

In April 2024, Märtha Louise objected to claims that Verrett did not grow up wealthy. To support her position, she presented a statement from a schoolmate of Verrett who claimed that everyone was jealous of his family's wealth, and shared a series of photographs of what she claimed was Durek's childhood home in Foster City, California. In a commentary for Nettavisen, royal correspondent Tove Taalesen criticized Märtha Louise's public defense of Verrett's childhood wealth, questioning why Märtha Louise places such emphasis on Verrett's alleged wealth as a child, and wrote that it is out of touch with Norway's more egalitarian values.

=== Sexual assault allegations ===
In October 2024, the Norwegian magazine Se og Hør published an article in which Durek Verrett was accused of sexual assault. The accusation came from Joakim Boström, a former representative of Verrett, who claimed that during a shamanistic session Verrett had inappropriately touched his genital area without consent. The magazine identified Verrett by name and presented the accusation as part of a broader series of reports on alleged boundary-crossing behavior in his professional practice.

Verrett denied the allegations and argued that Se og Hør had failed to substantiate them. Through his legal representative, he also objected to the publication of a nude photograph of him that had appeared in Se og Hør in September 2024, stating that the image had been taken privately many years earlier and never intended for publication.

In March 2025, the Norwegian Press Complaints Commission (PFU) ruled that Se og Hør had breached good journalistic practice on two counts. The publication of a nude photograph was deemed a violation of Verrett's privacy, and the article on sexual assault was found to rely on a single, uncorroborated source in breach of standards for verification. PFU stressed that serious allegations against a named individual require more thorough investigation. A minority of the commission disagreed regarding the assault story, but the majority concluded that Se og Hør had acted in breach of press ethics on both issues.

On the same day of the release of the Netflix-documentary Rebel Royals in September 2025, a 46-minute recording surfaced on YouTube and Instagram, featuring voice messages from Verrett to former MTV star Eric Nies, in which he appeared to admit to engaging in sexual acts with multiple clients during healing sessions. The recordings, originally reported by Se og Hør in 2024, include Verrett acknowledging that he had "crossed boundaries".

== Relationship with Princess Märtha Louise and reception in Norway ==
=== Dating ===
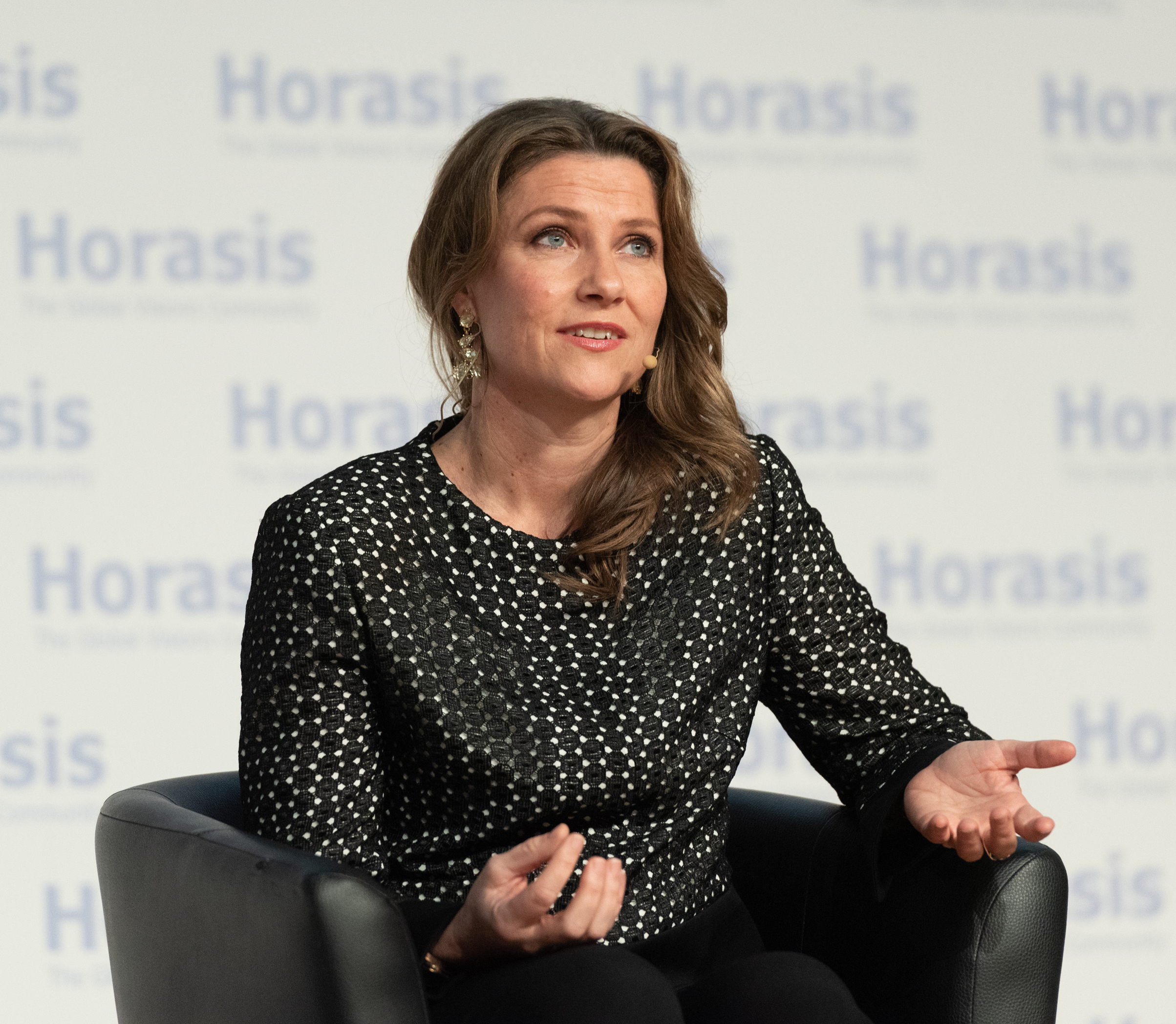
Märtha Louise in 2019

In May 2019, Verrett began dating and professionally collaborating with Princess Märtha Louise of Norway. Verrett and Märtha Louise co-organised a lecture tour titled "The Princess and the Shaman", which was widely criticised for the claims made by Verrett about healing cancer and for exploiting Märtha Louise's constitutional role as princess for a private business venture.

In October 2019, on his podcast Ancient Wisdom Today, Verrett openly discussed his and his girlfriend's sex life and his techniques for controlling his orgasm to maximize partner satisfaction. The Norwegian press quickly picked up the story, with Dagbladet and Nettavisen publishing detailed accounts of Verrett's revelations. The publications were criticized by press ethicists for crossing the line of what should be reported from the private lives of public figures, with former Press Association secretary general Per Edgar Kokkvold remarking that Verrett "should be protected from himself", but that the press also bore responsibility for its editorial choices. Following criticism, Verrett removed the podcast episode. Märtha Louise later commented that she had not been aware of the recording in advance, described it as a mistake on Verrett's part, and said that he had learned from the incident.

The relationship between Verrett and Märtha Louise has been heavily scrutinized, with many Norwegians voicing their disapproval and calling Verrett a "charlatan".

=== Engagement ===
In June 2022, Märtha Louise announced that she and Verrett were engaged and the couple announced in September 2023 the date of their nuptials, followed by a warm official statement of the Norwegian King and Queen.

Both Verrett and Märtha Louise have complained about the negative reception of Verrett in Norway.

In October 2022, Crown Prince Haakon, Märtha Louise's brother, told Norwegian broadcaster NRK that the matter of Verrett's position in their family is difficult and will take time to solve.

In November 2022, Märtha Louise relinquished her remaining official duties to focus on her alternative medicine business with Verrett, and to differentiate more clearly between her own activities and her relationship to the Royal House of Norway.

=== Marriage ===
On 13 September 2023, Durek Verrett and Princess Märtha Louise announced that their wedding would take place in Geiranger, a village located at the end of a fjord (listed as a UNESCO World Heritage Site) in the Western part of Norway, on 31 August 2024. The ceremony was held at Hotel Union, with celebrations lasting from 29 August to 1 September. The Norwegian royal family attended, and from Sweden it was attended by Crown Princess Victoria and Prince Daniel, as well as Prince Carl Philip and Princess Sofia.

Verrett and Märtha Louise sold the rights to the wedding to Hello! Magazine. Norwegian media described the wedding as "comical" and "embarrassing", sparking outrage over perceived greed and betrayal of Norwegian traditions and the taxpayers who fund the monarchy. The decision to conceal themselves in a plastic tent and behind a curtain to prevent anyone but tabloid photographers from "Hello!" magazine from capturing images of their wedding was widely criticized as a display of "shame and greed". Norwegian media criticized King Harald V for legitimizing and endorsing the exploitation of national values and symbols for Märtha Louise's and Durek Verrett's personal financial gain. Political scientist Torvald Valland Therkildsen described the royal family as a parody that is a source of embarrassment for Norway. Bergens Tidende questioned the claimed celebrity status of Verrett, describing him as "at best a D-list celebrity in Hollywood" and characterized the guest list at his wedding as more akin to an Alternative (New Age) Fair than Hollywood.

Durek Verrett has faced accusations of manipulating his Instagram account in the lead-up to his wedding. Media experts have suggested that the large spikes in followers and likes on Verrett's posts may indicate the purchase of fake engagement. The fluctuations in follower counts and likes deviate significantly from historical patterns, raising concerns about the authenticity of his social media activity. Tove Taalesen wrote that Verrett's career as an "influencer" appears to be "one big fraud".

Märtha Louise's antagonistic relationship with the media, stemming from the criticism over what critics describe as her commercial exploitation of the title "princess", led her to declare a boycott of Norwegian media in 2024.

In August 2024 Verrett said that his relationship with Märtha Louise led to a rift between her and her closest friends. Verrett accused Märtha Louise's close friends of being racists. He said her friends had repeatedly called her and urged her to end the relationship with him. In a subsequent interview that Verrett and Märtha Louise conducted together, Märtha Louise also said she had lost friends and accused them of "racism", echoing Verrett's claims against her former friends.

Verrett and Märtha Louise have been criticized for exploiting her title and role as a member of the extended royal family, deliberately disregarding an agreement not to use the title "Princess" or her connection to the royal family in any commercial activities, interviews, or other public activities. A majority of Norwegians favor the removal of her title. The political editor of Nettavisen Erik Stephansen criticized Märtha Louise's complaints about the coverage of Verrett and herself, and wrote that she has "actively sought the spotlight with her entire family, exploited the princess title in every conceivable way – including commercially – and is now fully engaged in milking her own glamorous celebrity wedding in Geiranger for all it's worth." Royal historian Trond Norén Isaksen said that "for the sake of the monarchy's integrity and reputation, it is absolutely necessary to sever the formal ties with Princess Märtha Louise" and that it is necessary "to revoke the princess title that Märtha Louise has exploited to its fullest extent. The royal family cannot be for sale."

A September 2024 Norstat poll for the Norwegian public broadcaster NRK indicated that support for the monarchy had fallen to 68%, a significant decrease from 81% in 2017. The poll also found that nearly four out of ten Norwegians had a more negative view of the royal family than a year prior. The respondents cited the controversies surrounding Princess Märtha Louise and Durek Verrett, along with the legal issues involving Marius Borg Høiby, as the reasons for the shift in opinion. The controversies have led to an increased debate on the future of the Norwegian monarchy.

=== Rebel Royals ===
Verrett and Märtha Louise were featured in the 2025 Netflix documentary Rebel Royals: An Unlikely Love Story, in which Verrett said he had not been welcomed with open arms by the royal family, and that King Harald, Queen Sonja and Crown Prince Haakon "didn't know what racism was" and that "they looked at me as if I were crazy when I said that racism existed." Verrett said the first time that King Harald asked about his experiences of racism was when Oprah with Meghan and Harry aired, and that "they didn't want a family discussion because they didn't want to treat me that way. They wanted to have a family discussion because they were afraid I might be the next one on Oprah." The royal family said the documentary violated Märtha Louise's and Verrett's agreement with the royal family not to use her title or connection to the royal family.

== Published work ==
- Spirit Hacking: Shamanic Keys to Reclaim Your Personal Power, Transform Yourself, and Light Up the World (Ed. St. Martin's Essentials, 2019). ISBN 1250217105
