= Usynlig =

Studio album by Tre Små Kinesere
- Released: 1 February 2014
- Recorded: 2013
- Studio: Krypten Lyd & Fanteri (Trondheim)
- Genre: Rock, pop
- Length: 39:13
- Label: Fono Fino
- Producer: Eik Larsen

Tre Små Kinesere chronology
I Live (2011)	Usynlig (2014)

Singles from Usynlig
- 1. "Tredve varmegrader kaldt" Released: 22 June 2013; 2. "Mennesket bak maska" Released: 1 February 2014

Usynlig is the tenth studio album from the Norwegian band Tre Små Kinesere. The album was released in February 2014 and was the first album in the band's career not to feature pianist and founding member Øystein Hegge, who left the group in fall 2012. The literal translation of the album's title "Usynlig" is "Invisible" in English. According to frontman and principal songwriter Ulf Risnes the album's theme is about feeling invisible, the overlooked, and how we view and take in the world around us.

== Track listing ==
All songs written by Ulf Risnes, except where noted.

1. «Babygrøt» – 3:07 – Ulf Risnes/Lars Lien
2. «Usynlig» – 2:38 – Ulf Risnes/Dag Erik Oksvold
3. «Ingenting virke» – 3:19 – Ulf Risnes/Øystein Hegge
4. «I dine sko» – 3:19
5. «Du går foran» – 2:51
6. «Du ska få en dommedag i morra» – 3:30
7. «Endelig» – 2:53
8. «Hør på pappa» – 3:18
9. «Puls» – 3:09
10. «Tredve varmegrader kaldt» – 3:50 – Risnes/Lien
11. «Viskelær» – 3:08
12. «Mennesket bak maska» – 4:11 – Ulf Risnes/Petter Jørgensen

== Personnel ==
- Ulf Risnes: Vocals, acoustic guitar, electric guitar, mandolin
- Lars Lien: Piano, synthesizer, accordion, backing vocals
- Eirik Øien: Bass
- Dag Erik Oksvold: Drums, backing vocals

=== Additional personnel ===
- Pål Brekkås: Engineer
- Ulf Holand: Mixing
- Thomas Henriksen: Mixing – «Tredve varmegrader kaldt»
- Morten Stendal: Mastering
