= Den siste revejakta =

- Norwegian theatrical release poster
- Directed by: Ulrik Imtiaz Rolfsen
- Written by: Mette Marit Bølstad; Thomas Seeberg Torjussen
- Based on: Den siste revejakta by Ingvar Ambjørnsen
- Produced by: Jan-Erik Gammleng; Synnøve Hørsdal
- Starring: Kristoffer Joner; Nicolai Cleve Broch; Kåre Conradi; Bjørn Sundquist; Thomas Bo Larsen; Gard Eidsvold; Linn Skåber
- Cinematography: Gaute Gunnari
- Release date: 29 August 2008
- Running time: 90 minutes
- Country: Norway
- Language: Norwegian
- Box office: 19,500,000 kr

Den siste revejakta is a Norwegian film from 2008 based on the novel by the same name. The movie is a comedy/drama. It was filmed in 2007 and premiered on 29 August 2008. The movie is directed by Ulrik Imtiaz Rolfsen.

The title Den siste revejakta literally means 'The Last Fox Hunt', but the title is a play on words since the Norwegian word 'rev' can mean reefer.

== Cast ==
- Kristoffer Joner as Carl
- Nicolai Cleve Broch as Robert
- Thomas Bo Larsen as Mogens
- Emilie K. Beck as Betty
- Kåre Conradi as Glenn
- Gard Eidsvold as Arild
- Hans Henrik Verpe as Christian
