= Adamseplene =

Adamseplene (The Adam's Apples) is a Trondheim-based review and musical group that was established in 1997. It consists of Ivar Nergaard, Klaus Joacim Sonstad, and Hans Petter Nilsen.

== History ==
The group's first show was called Om mens og menn (About Menstruation and Men). The show premiered at Trindheim's Veita Scene concert venue in May 1998. It was a success, and it played for an additional two months in Trondheim that fall. In 1999, the group released the album .no on the record label Norske Gram. For this, the trio was expanded with three musicians: Sola Jonsen (from DumDum Boys), Truls Waagø (from the Trondheim Symphony Orchestra), and Jostein Ansnes (from Dadafon).

In March 2000, Adamseplene premiered the show Full Pupp (Full Ti(l)t), which was also a success in the Trondheim area. In 2001 the show was made into a six-episode television series that was broadcast on NRK that fall: Adamseplene: Full pupp. The group also appeared on NRK radio.

In the fall of 2006, the group performed the show Alle tiders julebord (The Christmas Table of All Time) at the Trøndelag Theater.
