= Truls Waagø =

Norwegian bass guitarist (born 1964)

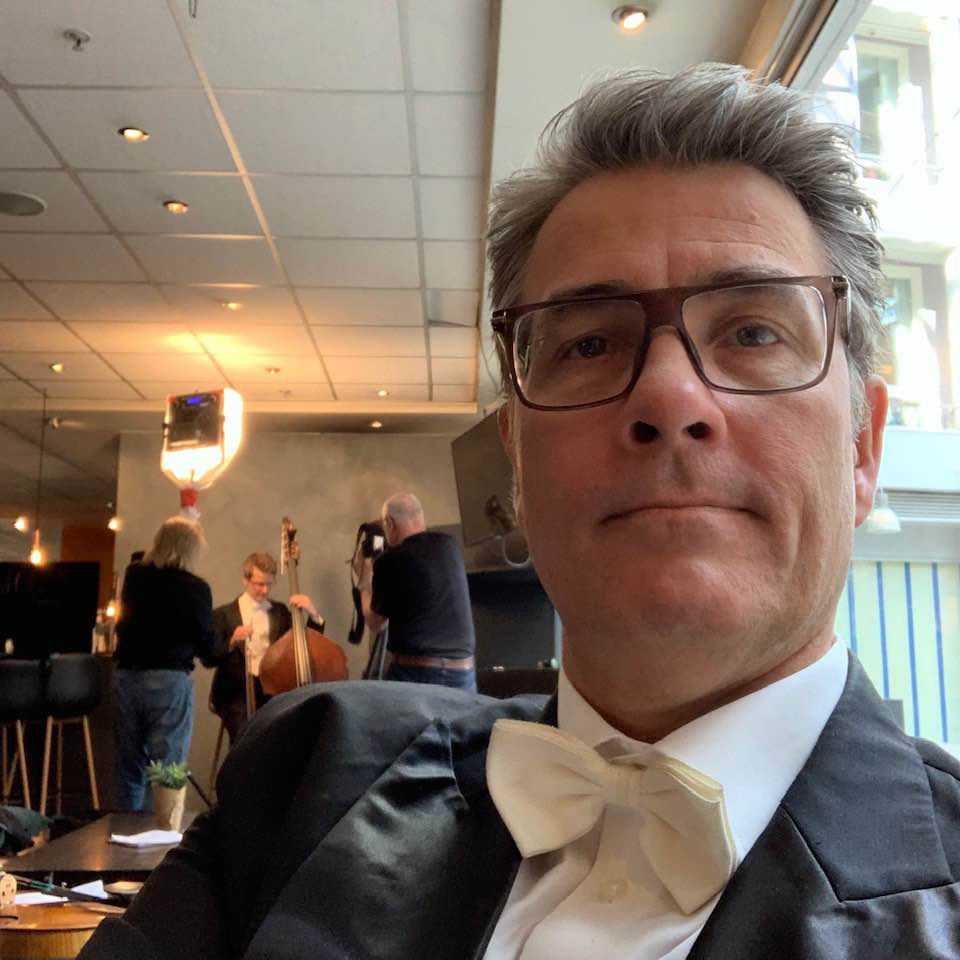
Truls Waagø

Truls Waagø (born January 6, 1964) is a Norwegian bass guitarist. He has been employed by the Trondheim Symphony Orchestra since 1987 and he is often used as an orchestral arranger. Waagø began his career with the band Slagerfabrikken in the 1970s. In addition to playing in the symphony orchestra, Waagø has also played in several other musical groups, including Tre Små Kinesere, Tango Concertino, Motorpsykkel, Revolver, and Adamseplene.

== Compositions ==
Waagø has produced several compositions in recent years, including the following:

- Lots Hustru (Lot's Wife). For women's choir and string orchestra
- Postcards. For symphony orchestra
- Aidsmesse (Aids Mass). For choir and sinfonietta
- Latin Concert, 2005. Violin concerto for violin solo and symphony orchestra
- M.E.G., 2006. For solo violin, viola, cello, and string orchestra
- Norsk dans no. 2006 (Norwegian dance no. 2006), 2006. For symphony orchestra
- Musikk for strykekvartett (Music for String Orchestra), 2006

== Discography ==
- Tango Concertino
  - Live in Olavshallen (1994)
- Adamseplene
  - Adamseplene.no (1999)
- Helter Skelter
  - Out of Range (2004)
- Valeria
  - Street Tango (2009)
- Tre Små Kinesere
  - Tro håp & kjærlighet (1996, studio musicians)
  - Storeslem (1998, studio musicians)
  - Gammel sykkel (2003, studio musicians)
  - Kjærlighet på tunga (2010)
  - I Live (2011)
- Other recordings
  - DumDum Boys: Sus (1996)
  - Postgirobygget: Melis (1996)
  - Student Society in Trondheim: Alt er sex (1997)
  - Postgirobygget: Essensuell (1997)
  - Postgirobygget: Best av alt (2003)
  - Various artists: Ringnes 2003 (2003)
  - Bajan: Ear (2006)
  - Are & A-laget: Få sjå på (2007)
  - The Soundbyte / Paul Irgens: City of Glass (2007)
  - Øystein Dolmen: Hjertespeil (2007)
  - Too Far Gone: Livåt, (Too Far Gone 15 År) (2008)
  - Øyvind Holm & Ulf Risnes: Safe and Sorry (2009)
  - Øystein Baadsvik: Snowflakes: A Classical Christmas (2011)
  - Børge Rømma: Bankers (2015)
