= Get Ready to Be Boyzvoiced =

- Directed by: Espen Eckbo; Henrik Elvestad; Mathis Fürst
- Written by: Espen Eckbo; Henrik Elvestad
- Produced by: Stein-Roger Bull
- Starring: Espen Eckbo; Øyvind Thoen
- Cinematography: Marius Johansen Hansen
- Edited by: Terje Oegema; Ruchir Tewari
- Music by: Jens Thoresen
- Release date: 1 December 2000
- Running time: 95 minutes
- Country: Norway
- Language: Norwegian

Get Ready to Be Boyzvoiced is a 2000 Norwegian mockumentary about a fictional boy band called Boyzvoice. Outside Norway, it has been screened multiple times on Australian television channel SBS.

== Plot ==
The band is a three-piece vocal group dominated by their utterly untalented lead singer "M*Pete". When they are caught lip-synching before the release of their first album, scandal erupts (fed also by their manager's physically assaulting an elderly male and an elderly female member of the Salvation Army and the revelation that M*Pete's 16-year-old girlfriend is actually only 12) and they are dropped by their record company. They consider leaving the music industry, but their manager gets them a sponsorship deal with a Norwegian fish finger manufacturer. Ultimately they bounce back to fame after an appearance at the HitAwards Norwegian music awards show.

== Cast ==
- Espen Eckbo as M'Pete, Ove, Waldemar, Web Designer, Radio DJ, Security Guard
- Øyvind Thoen as Hot Tub
- Kaare Daniel Steen as Roar
- Henrik Elvestad as Manager Timothy Dahle
- Linn Skåber as Wenche Pettersen (Public Relations Manager)
- Atle Antonsen as Titano Music Festival Arranger
- Jon Øigarden as Concert Arranger Sverre Bratsberg
- Trond-Viggo Torgersen as Producer Jens Ovesen
- Jorunn Kjellsby as Ingrid Lund-Bergseter (the boys' mum)
- Harald Brenna as Alf Lund-Bergseter (the boys' dad)
- Ida Thorkildsen Valvik as Stine (M'Pete's girlfriend)
- Bernhard Arnø as Choreographer Stian Mørdre
- Nikis Theophilakis as Lars Erik Martinsen (of Frionor Seafoods)
- Tony Totino as Brian Kauffman (Head of record company)
- Trond Høvik as Salvation Army Officer
- Eivind Sander as Se & Hør Journalist
- Thorkil Johan Aschehoug as Vocal coach
- Arild Svensgam as Head of removals firm where M'Pete and Hot Tub work
- Bodil Lahelle as Lady of the Salvation Army
- Espen Søland as Vocal Analyst
- Heine Totland as himself
- Peter Singsaas as himself
- Espen Lind as himself
- Morten Abel as himself
- Christian Ingebrigtsen as himself
- Ben Adams as himself
- Paul Marazzi as himself
- Mark Read as himself
- Dorthe Skappel as herself
- Per Kristian Indrehus as himself
- Ingrid Boon Ulfsby as M'Pete's Cousin in "Cousin" video

== Production ==
Although the actors portraying band members pretend to be utterly talentless and unable to get one single note right in the film, all Boyzvoices vocals were in reality performed by actor Øyvind Thoen (Hot Tub), and, on occasion, actor Espen Eckbo (M'Pete).
