= Rebel Royals: An Unlikely Love Story =

2025 documentary film

- Promotional poster
- Genre: Documentary film
- Directed by: Rebecca Chaiklin
- Starring: Princess Märtha Louise of Norway; Durek Verrett
- Composer: Mark Yaeger
- Country of origin: United States
- Original language: English

Production
- Producers: Chris Smith; Rebecca Chaiklin; Stacy Smith
- Editor: Amanda Griffin
- Running time: 101 minutes
- Production companies: Library Films; Article 19

Original release
- Network: Netflix
- Release: 26 September 2025

Rebel Royals: An Unlikely Love Story is a 2025 documentary film featuring Princess Märtha Louise of Norway and her husband Durek Verrett. It was released on 16 September 2025 by Netflix. The production followed the couple in the lead-up to their wedding in Geiranger and presented their relationship as a modern royal love story. The couple sold exclusive rights to their wedding to Netflix and Hello! magazine, while shutting out the Norwegian press from the ceremony. This decision drew sharp criticism in Norway, where commentators described the arrangement as a commercial transaction that further blurred the lines between royalty and private business ventures.

== Content ==
Upon the release of the trailer, Norwegian commentators criticized the documentary as a commercial exploitation of Märtha Louise's royal title in violation of an agreement she had signed with the royal household in 2019, later extended to include Verrett, which barred use of the princess title or royal association for commercial purposes. After seeing the trailer, Aftenposten commentator Harald Stanghelle characterized the documentary as "a purely commercial affair," arguing that it clearly played on the royal connection in breach of the agreement with the palace.

In the trailer, Märtha Louise was portrayed as "the biggest celebrity" in Norway, while Verrett reiterated his claim that he is "half reptilian" and stated that he "would like a royal wedding because [he was] going to be royal." He also said that he was open to dating beings from other planets. Norwegian royal commentator Tove Taalesen, interviewed for the documentary, remarked that Verrett might be "a scam artist." In her review of the documentary, Taalesen wrote that the documentary is "a display of madness, eccentric people, and the pursuit of attention – at the expense of King Harald."

In the documentary, Verrett said he had not been welcomed with open arms by the royal family, and that King Harald, Queen Sonja and Crown Prince Haakon "didn't know what racism was" and that "they looked at me as if I were crazy when I said that racism existed." He said the King and Queen hated his clothes, everything he did, and that they "would always let Märtha know" he was the wrong boyfriend for her. Verrett said the first time that King Harald asked about his experiences of racism was when Oprah with Meghan and Harry aired, and that "they didn't want a family discussion because they didn't want to treat me that way. They wanted to have a family discussion because they were afraid I might be the next one on Oprah."

== Reception ==
Norwegian media called the documentary and Verrett's statements a "character assassination of the king and queen." Norwegian commentators said Verrett and Märtha Louise "are making fools of themselves."

The royal family said the documentary violated Märtha Louise's and Verrett's agreement with the royal family not to use her title or connection to the royal family. The documentary was described as mentioning the title "princess" every third minute and as a "middle finger to the royal family.", according to TV2. It reignited demands that the king must strip Märtha of her title to prevent further abuse of a constitutional title tied to state functions. Royal historian Trond Norén Isaksen said to NRK the agreement has been violated numerous times and that only way to solve the problem would be to remove Märtha Louise's title.

Aftenposten, in its review of the documentary, wrote that "Rebel Royals tells us that Märtha and Durek are often subjected to criticism, but have never themselves done anything worthy of criticism. The film is a demonstration of the duo's lack of ability to accept self-criticism," and that King Harald is "heavily exploited" in the film. Dagbladet called the documentary propaganda that "appears mostly like an advertisement for the couple themselves."

Verrett and Märtha Louise invited to a party to celebrate the documentary. Royal commentator Tove Taalesen, who was interviewed in the documentary, called it tasteless.
