= 365 Fri =

Studio album by Tre Små Kinesere
- Released: 1990
- Recorded: 1989
- Genre: Pop
- Length: 39:12
- Label: CBS
- Producer: Roger Valstad

Tre Små Kinesere chronology
365 Fri (1990)	Luftpalass (1991)

365 Fri is the debut album of the Norwegian band Tre Små Kinesere. It was an instant hit in their home country, reaching number two on the album charts. Their acoustic, melodic pop songs written by singer and guitarist Ulf Risnes represented an antithesis to the predominant punk-inspired rock played by bands such as Dum Dum Boys or Raga Rockers. The songs "Ingen Blir Igjen" ("No one Remains", dealing with the problem of depopulation of regional Norway) and "Kjærlighet" ("Love", about problematic relationships) have become airplay classics.

== Track listing ==
1. Ingen blir igjen
2. Du e der væl?
3. Matbit
4. 365 fri
5. Da jorda va flat
6. Kamerat pære
7. Hei verden
8. Viktig ærend
9. Glyserinmusikk
10. Salig
11. Okavango
12. Kjærlighet
13. Sorte Tyr
