= Oslolosen =

Fictional Character

Kjell Aronsen, known as "Oslolosen".

Kjell Aronsen, known as "Oslolosen", is a fictional character on the Norwegian sketch comedy television show Uti vår hage 2, a show that ran on the Norwegian Broadcasting Corporation (NRK) in the spring of 2008. The character, portrayed by Harald Eia, premiered in episode two of the show, and has also appeared in several shorter segments released directly onto the NRK website and on YouTube. As of 1 September 2011, some of the YouTube episodes have received as many as 800,000 views.

== Character biography ==
The character is a certified guide for the city of Oslo, though his title – "oslolosen" – uses a Norwegian word corresponding to the English "maritime pilot". The meaning of this becomes clear from his first appearance, where his job is to lead a group of men from Northern Norway – who have managed to get stuck in a roundabout – onto the right exit. He is consequently obliged by law to give the three men a guided tour of the capital. It later becomes clear that he also has a secondary task: to shoot with tranquilizer darts artists and performers who have arrived in Oslo from the countryside to realise their creative potential, so that they can be released back into their natural habitat. Little is known about Aronsen's own background, but according to himself a certified oslolos must be "conceived, born, brought up and molested" in Oslo. However, his use of the traditional Oslo dialect as well as his fondness for the East End, would suggest origins in the city's working class districts. He has a deep connection to the Sagene district, where it is often believed he was conceived.

Aronsen's version of Oslo's culture and history often diverges dramatically from what is the conventionally accepted truth, and he is also passionate in his insistence that the official version of the city, presented to tourists, is a distortion of reality. Elements that frequently occur in his narratives are Labour history, prostitution, and Jewish businesspeople. His comportment can be aggressive, and his language is often obscene and scatological.

== In real life ==
In March 2008 a competition was held where fans of the show could win an actual guided tour with a real, certified Oslo-guide and the oslolosen-character. On 1 April 2008, 25 winners were led on a tour of the city where Eia would interrupt the official guide with contradictory, largely improvised comments. The popularity of the character was shown by fans coming – by plane – from as far away as Stjørdal.

According to online newspaper Nettavisen, a man from Tønsberg was in March selling t-shirts with images and catch-phrases clearly taken from "oslolosen" printed on them. Harald Eia himself had no problems with the venture, and thought NRK had been acting too slowly with their own t-shirt production to capitalise on the popular attention. NRK on the other hand considered the t-shirt an infringement of copyright, and would take steps to stop the unauthorised sales.
