= Linn Skåber =

Norwegian actress and comedian

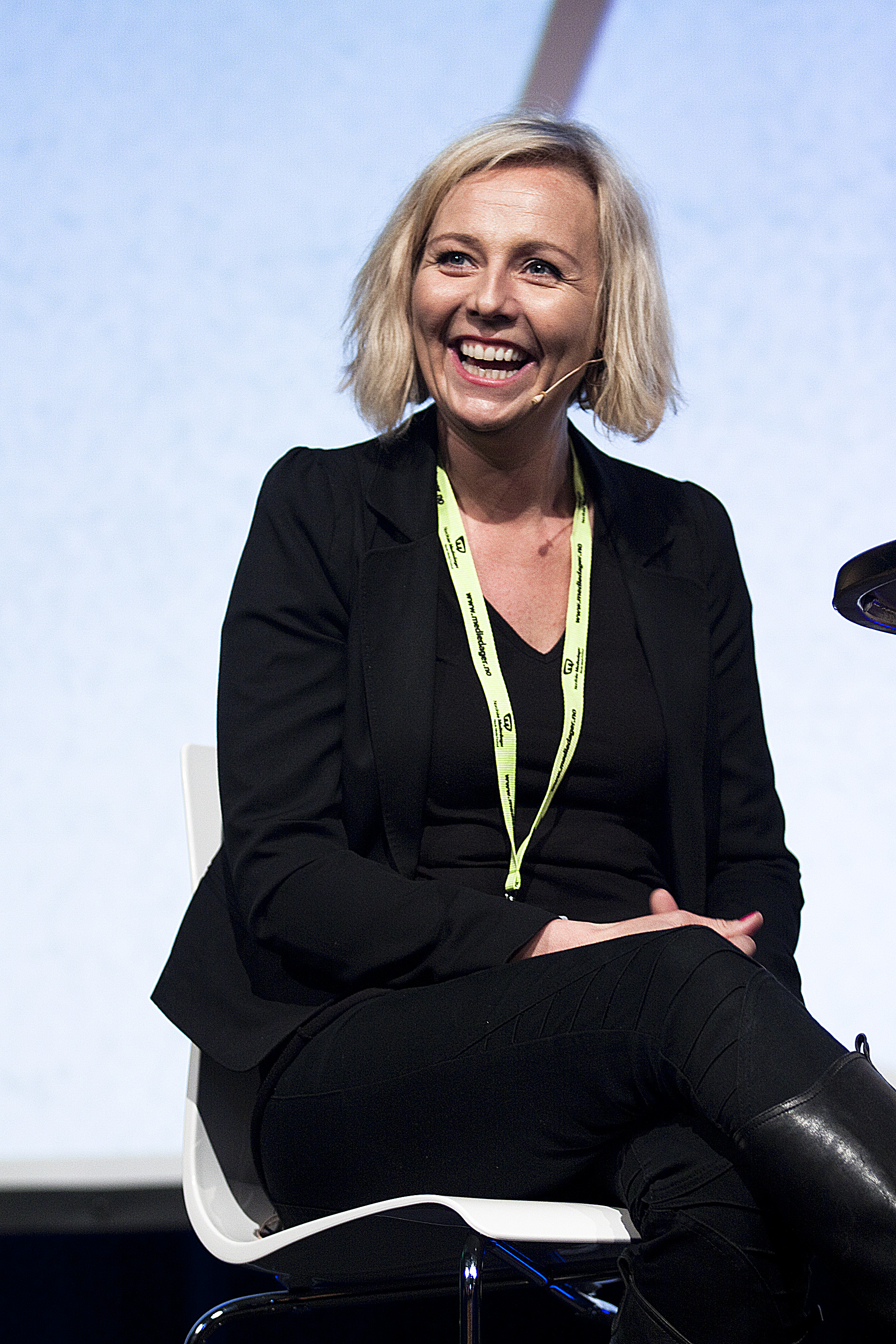
- Skåber in 2010
- Born: 31 March 1970 (age 56); Oslo, Norway
- Occupations: Actress, singer, comedian, text writer
- Years active: 1993–present

Linn Skåber (born 31 March 1970) is a Norwegian actress, singer, comedian, text writer and TV personality. She made her stage début on Oslo Nye Teater (Centralteatret) in 1997, playing the title role in Goldoni's comic opera Mirandolina.

Skåber received Komiprisen in 2006 (best female artist), for her role in Utlendingen, and a Gullruten award in 2007, for the TV series Hjerte til hjerte.

From 2007 to 2013, she was a panellist in the weekly TV comedy program "Nytt på nytt".

== Personal life ==
Skåber was born in Oslo on 31 March 1970.

== Stage performance ==
After her theatre debut with Mirandolina, she played in the musicals Beatles and Rocky Horror Show on Oslo Nye Teater (Centralteatret).

Outside the theatre stage she played with the cabaret group Lompelandslaget from 1993 to 2001, where she also contributed as script writer. She toured with Kristopher Schau in Reidar Roses orkester in the mid 1990s. "We had no money, played on the street, and slept over with strangers", she said in an interview a decade later.

== Films ==
Her film debut was a minor role in 1732 Høtten (1998) (English title Bloody Angels). She has further participated in the films Fire høytider (2000), Get Ready to be Boyzvoiced (2000), Tommys inferno (2005), Vinterkyss (2005), Gymnaslærer Perdersen (2006), and Den siste revejakta (2008).

Participating in the film Kong Curling (2011), she was shortlisted for an Amanda award for best supporting role, and she played a central role in the comedy film Staying Alive.

== TV ==
Skåber has participated in several TV series, among these are Sejer - se deg ikke tilbake (2000), Ca. Lykkelig (2000/2001), Nissene på låven (2001), Sushi (2001), Brødrene Dal og mysteriet om Karl XIIs gamasjer (2005) and Herte til hjerte (2007). The TV-series "Hjerte til hjerte" lead to wide media coverage, and Skåber became a popular guest star in Norwegian entertainment programs (16 guest appearances in eleven different programs during the first half part of 2007, more than anybody else in that period).

== Writing ==
She has worked as script writer on several productions, both for her own performances and for others.

- 2001: «Erotiske dikt: en diktsamling du bør ha under puten» (Erotic poems) (editor and contributor).

Her book Til ungdommen from 2018 was illustrated by Lisa Aisato. Further books are Til de voksne from 2020, and Til oss – fra de eldste from 2021.

Her play Mens vi venter på no' godt from 2022 was staged at Nationaltheatret, and a book edition was published in 2022.

== Awards ==
- 2006 – Komiprisen ("best female artist")
- 2007 – Gullruten (for her starring role in the TV series Hjerte til hjerte)
- 2012 – the Leonard Statuette.
