= Ca. Lykkelig =

- Genre: Sitcom
- Directed by: Arild Brubakk; Trond Lie
- Starring: Ivar Nergaard; Linn Skåber; Tore Chr. Sævold; Jasmin Aasland; Siv Charlotte Klynderud
- Country of origin: Norway
- Original language: Norwegian
- No. of seasons: 1

Production
- Producer: Berit Steen
- Running time: 30 minutes (including commercials)

Original release
- Network: TV 2
- Release: 2000

Ca. lykkelig was a Norwegian sitcom that was broadcast on TV 2.

== Plot ==
The series was about three more or less successful couples in their 30s. The cast consisted of three couples: Ivar Nergaard as Aksel and Linn Skåber as Liv; Arvid Ones as Arne and Siv Charlotte Klynderud as Kirsti; Tore Chr. Sævold as Karsten and Jasmin Aasland as Lotte.

Aftenposten gave the sitcom a mediocre review. Linn Skåber received attention for her role. After 13 episodes the show was deemed to be successful, and TV 2 signalized that a second season was to be made. Some months later it was decided to stop the show, after Linn Skåber pursued other projects.
