= United (2003 film) =

- Starring: Håvard Lilleheie; Berte Rommetveit; Sondre Sørheim; Vegar Hoel
- Release date: 2003
- Country: Norway
- Language: Norwegian

United is a Norwegian movie that was released in 2003.

The main characters are: Kåre (Håvard Lilleheie), Anna (Berte Rommetveit), Iversen (Sondre Sørheim), and Stian (Vegar Hoel). Henrik Mestad and Harald Eia play smaller roles. Football commentator Arne Scheie debuts on the big screen in this romantic comedy.

The film received "die throws" of 3 in Dagsavisen, and 4 in Stavanger Aftenblad, Dagbladet, VG, Aftenposten, Bergens Tidende, and Nordlys.

== See also ==
- List of association football films
