= Ivar Nergaard =

Norwegian actor and writer (born 1964)

- Born: July 13, 1964 (age 61)
- Occupation: Actor
- Partner: Hilde Borg Nesbakk

Ivar Nergaard (born July 13, 1964) is a Norwegian actor and writer, born in Rena, Norway.

== Career ==
Nergaard has performed in several venues, including the Trøndelag Theater, and has had roles in the television series Ca. Lykkelig and Ran. He was the presenter for TVNorge's program Skjult kamera (Hidden Camera) in 1999, and in 2001 he was a member of the musical group Adamseplene in the series Adamseplene: Full pupp on NRK. In addition to his work as an actor and copywriter with Adamseplene, Nergaard has also written lyrics for and performed in the rock band Ompakara. In the early 2000s he was engaged as a writer for the newspaper Byavisa in Trondheim.

Since he started narrating weekly magazines for the Norwegian Association of the Blind in Trondheim in the 1990s, Nergaard has also made a career as a narrator of audiobooks. In 2012 he won the Lydbokforlaget (Audio Book Publishers) narrator prize for both children's and adult books.

== Discography ==
=== Adamseplene ===
- Adamseplene.no (1999)

=== Ompakara ===
- Heller væra cowboy enn indianer! (2008)
- Gangsterpolka (2008)

=== Participated in ===
- Shitty: Happy Again (1997)
- Hallo i uken: Et rop om hjelp: Hallo i uken 1990–99 (2000)
- Bo Kamskjells Orkester: Fisboblefest (2004)
- Various artists: Norge Midt-Norge "Norge 1905" – Fra Trøndelag Teaters revy (2005)
- Famntak: Leirfivellandet (2006)
- Various artists: Fight Apathy – 46 artister, 31 nyinnspillinger (2009)
- DumDum Boys: Tidsmaskin (2009)
- Various artists: Supersanger med Fantorangen og Kuraffen (2010)
