= Atle Antonsen =

Norwegian comedian and actor

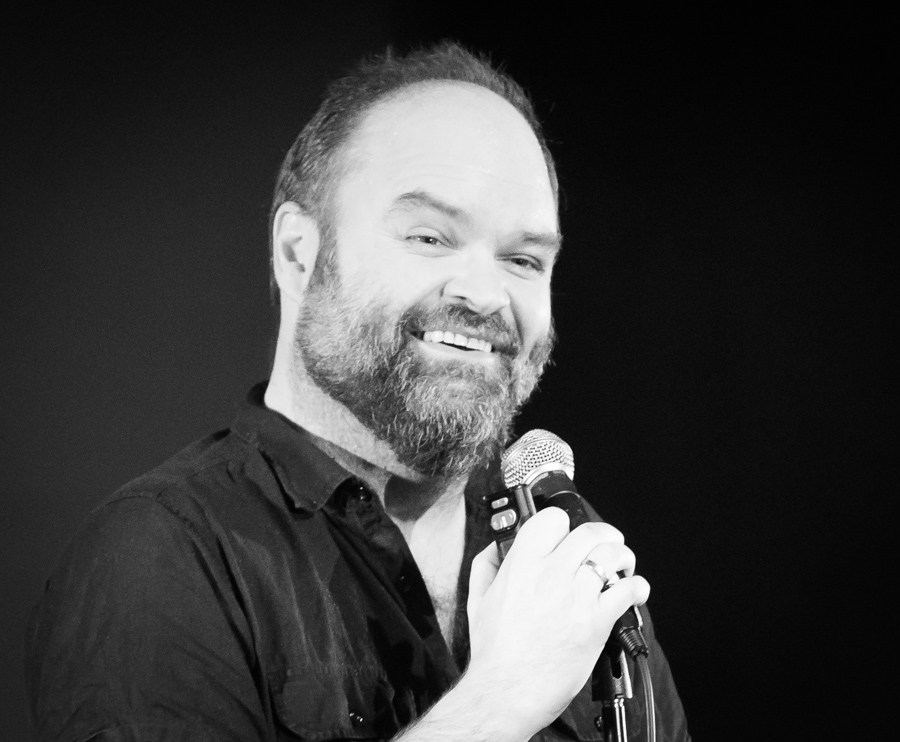
- Antonsen in 2017
- Born: 11 August 1969 (age 56); Lillehammer, Oppland, Norway
- Occupations: Comedian and actor
- Years active: 1998–present

Atle Antonsen (born 11 August 1969, in Lillehammer) is a Norwegian comedian and actor.

Antonsen has participated in and contributed to several television and radio shows, including XL and XLTV (1998–99), Nissene på låven (2001), Uti vår hage (2003), Team Antonsen (2004), Tre brødre som ikke er brødre (2005), Etaten (2006), Uti vår hage 2 (2008), Dag (2010–15), and Nissene over skog og hei (2011). He has also appeared in feature films, including starring roles in the animated feature Kurt blir grusom (Kurt Turns Evil, 2008) and the comedy Kong Curling (Curling King, 2011). He also appeared in the music video for Lemaitre's song We Got U.

Antonsen has cooperated with such comedians as Harald Eia, Bård Tufte Johansen, Kristopher Schau, Johan Golden, and Espen Thoresen Hværsaagod-Takkskalduha. Atle Antonsen and Johan Golden currently host a weekly radio show called "Misjonen" ("The Mission") on Fridays on Norwegian national radio station P4. The show first aired in August 2008, and was a continuation of their previous radio show "Kommisjonen" ("The Commission") which aired on now-defunct radio station Kanal 24.

In the Norwegian parliamentary election in 2001 Antonsen and Golden spearheaded the campaign for The Political Party, a party formed as a satiric statement on modern politics.

Antonsen is a member of German-language rock band DDR, most famous for their comical music videos, along with Johan Golden.

Antonsen has been awarded a Norwegian Comedy Award (Komiprisen) four times: Best Stand-up in 2004 and Male Comedian of the Year in 2007, 2008, and 2012. He also received Gullruten for Best Actor for Tre brødre som ikke er brødre in 2006. On 1 September 2007, at the Norwegian Comedy Awards, Antonsen was awarded the Male Comedian of the Year. He started his speech by saying that the last time he won an award, his mother told him that he didn't thank people properly, and that he was going to do better this time. He paused for a couple of seconds before shouting out "Damnit! (Faen!) Didn't work this time either."

In 2010, he briefly appeared at the Eurovision Song Contest 2010 in Oslo.

In 2012 he starred as King Arthur in the highly successful Norwegian staging of Spamalot, at Folketeatret in Oslo.

Since 2019, Antonsen has hosted Kongen befaler, the Norwegian version of the British TV series Taskmaster, in the role of the Taskmaster, with Olli Wermskog as his assistant. Kongen befaler was awarded Gullruten for Best Entertainment Program in 2022. In November 2022, Antonsen announced he was stepping down from the role after being reported to the police by poet and author Sumaya Jirde Ali for racist remarks on 23 October 2022 at Bar Boca in Oslo. The case was dismissed the same month, and in August 2023, Antonsen's return to Kongen befaler was announced.

== Filmography ==
- Get Ready to be Boyzvoiced (2000)
- Tommy's Inferno (2005)
- Pitbullterje (2005)
- Kurt Blir Grusom (2006)
- Kong Curling (2010)
- Fuck Up (2012)
- Kraftidioten (2014)
- Jakten På Berlusconi (2014)
- Doktor Proktors Prompepulver (2014)
- Wendyeffekten (2015)
- Presten I Paradis (2015)
- Doktor Proktors Tidsbadekar (2015)
- Grand Hotel (2016)
- Norske Byggeklosser (2018)
- I Onde Dager (2021)

== TV shows ==
- XLTV (1998)
- Åpen Post (1998)
- Nissene På Låven (2001)
- Tre Brødre Som Ikke Er Brødre (2005)
- Etaten (2006)
- Uti Vår Hage (2003 – 2008)
- Team Antonsen (2004)
- Den Unge Fleksnes (2010)
- Solsidan (2010) (1 Episode)
- Nissene Over Skog Og Hei (2011)
- NAV (2012)
- DAG (2010 – 2015)
- Jul I Blodfjell (2017)
- Kongen Befaler (2019-)
