= Gymnaslærer Pedersens beretning om den store politiske vekkelse som har hjemsøkt vårt land =

1982 novel by Dag Solstad

Gymnaslærer Pedersens beretning om den store politiske vekkelse som har hjemsøkt vårt land is a novel by Dag Solstad published in 1982. The title translates as Gymnasium Teacher Pedersen's Account of the Great Political Awakening Which Has Haunted Our Country.

The novel tells the story of the young history teacher Knut Pedersen and his involvement with the Maoist movement, more specifically that associated with Workers' Communist Party in Larvik in the early 1970s.

It was later adapted into a 2006 film named Comrade Pedersen in English.

== Publishing history ==
- Gymnaslærer Pedersens beretning om den store politiske vekkelse som har hjemsøkt vårt land / Dag Solstad. [Oslo] : Oktober, c1982. 282 p.; 21 cm. ISBN 82-7094-359-2
