= Tre Små Kinesere =

Norwegian musical group

- Origin: Trondheim, Norway
- Genres: Pop
- Years active: 1988–present
- Labels: CBS/Sony
- Members: Ulf Risnes; Lars Lien; Eirik Øien; Dag Erik Oksvold; Freddy Bolsø; Daniel Børmark
- Past members: Knut Juel; Baard Slagsvold; Øystein Hegge; Truls Waagø
- Website: www.soleplassland.net

Tre Små Kinesere are a pop group based in Trondheim, Norway which, since their beginning in the 1990s, have defined their own acoustic style. They recorded nine albums between then and 2004 to come back in 2010. The band was composed of Ulf Risnes (vocals and guitar), Øystein Hegge (vocals and keyboard), and Baard Slagsvold (vocals and bass).

== History ==
Tre Små Kinesere was established in 1988, when the band recorded a track for the compilation album Den akustiske gitarliga. After a number of concerts and favorable audience reaction in 1988 and 1989, the band was signed to the CBS/Sony label in June 1989. Their debut album, 365 Fri, was released on January 17, 1990. This album was nominated for the Spellemannprisen in 1991, but did not receive it. In 1991, they released their second album, Luftpalass, which earned them the Spellemannprisen in 1992.

In spring 1995 the band received its second Spellemann Award. They won the prize in the band category for their fourth album, Hjertemedisin, which had been released the previous year.

In April 2004 it was announced that bassist Baard Slagsvold would be leaving the band. Risnes and Hegge completed some tour dates during the following summer with Truls Waagø as a stand-in, but the band officially broke up in February 2005. Risnes and Hegge stated at the time that it "would not feel right to continue without Baard."

== Members ==
=== Present members ===
- Ulf Risnes – lead vocals, guitar (1988 - 2005, 2010 -)
- Lars Lien – piano, accordion, backing vocals (2013 -)
- Eirik Øien – bass, backing vocals (2013 -)
- Dag Erik Oksvold - drums, backing vocals (2013 -)
- Freddy Bolsø – drums, backing vocals (2013 -)
- Daniel Børmark – bass, backing vocals (2014 -)

=== Previous members ===
- Knut Juel – drums (1988)
- Baard Slagsvold – bass, vocals (1988 - 2004)
- Øystein Hegge – piano, accordion, backing vocals (1988 - 2005, 2010 - 2012)
- Truls Waagø – bass, vocals (2010 - 2013)

== Selected discography ==
=== Studio albums ===
Title	Album details	Peak chart positions
Title	Album details	NOR
365 Fri	Released: 1990; Label: CBS (#466300)	2
Luftpalass	Released: 1991; Label: CBS (#467580)	11
Vær Sær	Released: 1992; Label: Columbia (#472375)	13
Hjertemedisin	Released: 1994; Label: Columbia (#477352)	11
Tro håp & kjærlighet	Released: 1996; Label: Columbia (#485344)	4
Ultralyd	Released: 1998; Label: 1-2-3 Records (#3SK1231)	23
Storeslem	Released: 1998; Label: Columbia (#491024)	21
Gammel Sykkel	Released: 2003; Label: Norwave (#NW208)	6
Kjærlighet På Tunga	Released: 2010; Label: MBN (#50110)	6
I Live	Released: 2011; Label: MBN (#50130)	38
Usynlig	Released: 2014; Label: Fono Fino (#FF0114)	—
Ok! Kompis	Released: 2017; Label: Fono Fino (#7071245432669)	—
Drømmeanker	Released: 2020; Label: Grappa (#GR4641)	—
"—" denotes items that did not chart or were not released in that territory.

=== Compilation albums ===
Title	Album details	Peak chart positions
Title	Album details	NOR
De Aller Beste Fra Tre Små Kinesere	Released: 2002; Label: Columbia (#508073)	4
"—" denotes items that did not chart or were not released in that territory.

Motorpsycho & Tre Små Kinesere

- 1997: Mot Riving (Harmonien Records)

Awards
Preceded by Sigvart Dagsland	Recipient of the Pop Spellemannprisen; 1991	Succeeded by Bel Canto
Preceded by Pogo Pops	Recipient of the Band Spellemannprisen; 1994	Succeeded by deLillos
