= Dag (Norwegian TV series) =

Norwegian comedy-drama television series

- Genre: Comedy drama
- Created by: Øystein Karlsen; Kristopher Schau
- Written by: Øystein Karlsen; Kristopher Schau
- Starring: Atle Antonsen; Tuva Novotny; Anders Baasmo Christiansen; Agnes Kittelsen; Rolf Lassgård
- Composer: Steve Wynn
- Country of origin: Norway
- Original language: Norwegian
- No. of series: 4
- No. of episodes: 40

Original release
- Network: TV 2 (Norway)
- Release: 30 September 2010 – 19 November 2015

Dag is a Norwegian comedy-drama television series which originally aired on the Norwegian television channel TV 2 from 2010 to 2015. The series is about a marriage guidance counsellor, Dag (Atle Antonsen), who has little faith in people or marriage.

== Cast ==
Actor	Character	Series			
Actor	Character	1	2	3	4
Atle Antonsen	Dag Refsnes	Main	Main	Main	Main
Anders Baasmo Christiansen	Benedikt Skovrand	Main	Main	Main	Main
Silje Torp Færavaag	Marianne Refsnes	Main		Recurring	
Agnes Kittelsen	Malin Tramell	Main	Main	Main	Main
Tuva Novotny	Eva Holstad	Main	Main	Main	Main
Ine Jansen	Mia Ballack	Main	Main	Main	Main
Rolf Lassgård	Ernst		Main	Main	Main

== Episodes ==
Series	Episodes	Originally released	
Series	Episodes	First released	Last released
1	10	30 September 2010	2 December 2010
2	10	22 September 2011	24 November 2011
3	10	17 January 2013	21 March 2013
4	10	17 September 2015	19 November 2015

=== Series 1 (2010) ===
No. overall	No. in series	Title	Directed by	Original release date
1	1	"Alene er ingen det svakeste leddet" "Alone is none the weakest link"	Øystein Karlsen	30 September 2010
2	2	"Stille vann er best å ro i" "Still water is best for rowing"	Øystein Karlsen	7 October 2010
3	3	"Kjærlighet i valiumens tid" "Love in the era of valium"	Øystein Karlsen	14 October 2010
4	4	"Eva"	Øystein Karlsen; Tuva Novotny	21 October 2010
5	5	"Som sønn, så far" "Like father, like son"	Øystein Karlsen	28 October 2010
6	6	"Døden befrir de som ikke har levd" "Death frees those who have not lived"	Øystein Karlsen	4 November 2010
7	7	"Lang natts ferd mot dag" "Long night's journey into day"	Øystein Karlsen	11 November 2010
8	8	"To er det ensomste tallet av alle" "Two is the loneliest number of all"	Øystein Karlsen	18 November 2010
9	9	"Speed for galleriet" "Speed for the gallery"	Øystein Karlsen	25 November 2010
10	10	"Verden banket på, jeg låste" "The world knocked, I locked the door"	Øystein Karlsen	2 December 2010

=== Series 2 (2011) ===
No. overall	No. in series	Title	Directed by	Original release date
11	1	"Over skyene er himmelen alltid grå" "Above the clouds the sky is always grey"	Øystein Karlsen	22 September 2011
12	2	"Alt som stiger opp, kommer en gang ned" "What goes up must come down"	Øystein Karlsen	29 September 2011
13	3	"Selv kynikere har et hjerte" "Even cynics have a heart"	Øystein Karlsen	6 October 2011
14	4	"Steril nærhet" "Sterile proximity"	Tuva Novotny	13 October 2011
15	5	"Man reder som man ligger med" "You make the bed you lie in"	Øystein Karlsen	20 October 2011
16	6	"Bøddelen fra Sibir" "The executioner from Siberia"	Øystein Karlsen	27 October 2011
17	7	"Hevneren fra Holmlia" "The avenger from Holmlia"	Øystein Karlsen	3 November 2011
18	8	"Et stort lite liv" "A great little life"	Øystein Karlsen	10 November 2011
19	9	"Ond mongo" "Evil Mongo"	Øystein Karlsen	17 November 2011
20	10	"Det er en sprekk i alle ting, der livet kommer inn" "There is a crack in everything, that’s how the life gets in"	Øystein Karlsen	24 November 2011

=== Series 3 (2013) ===
No. overall	No. in series	Title	Directed by	Original release date
21	1	"De man faller for"	Øystein Karlsen	17 January 2013
22	2	"Det er hverdagen som knekker en"	Øystein Karlsen	24 January 2013
23	3	"Fortiden tvinger fremtiden i kne"	Øystein Karlsen	31 January 2013
24	4	"Jeg trenger ingen"	Øystein Karlsen; Tuva Novotny	7 February 2013
25	5	"Å strekke seg mot bunnen"	Øystein Karlsen	14 February 2013
26	6	"Baconmannen ringer alltid to ganger"	Øystein Karlsen	21 February 2013
27	7	"Gjennom galskapens frodige øyne"	Øystein Karlsen	28 February 2013
28	8	"Døden gir livet perspektiv"	Øystein Karlsen	7 March 2013
29	9	"Guds sønn - Lloyd"	Øystein Karlsen	14 March 2013
30	10	"To bryllup og en begravelse"	Øystein Karlsen	21 March 2013

=== Series 4 (2015) ===
No. overall	No. in series	Title	Directed by	Original release date
31	1	"Incontinent Mammoth"	Øystein Karlsen	17 September 2015
32	2	"Do You Want Me to Plug It In?"	Øystein Karlsen	24 September 2015
33	3	"Buried Relationship"	Øystein Karlsen	1 October 2015
34	4	"Bacon? Salt of the Earth"	Øystein Karlsen	8 October 2015
35	5	"Angst and Paralyzed Escape"	Øystein Karlsen	15 October 2015
36	6	"Drug Craving Badger"	Øystein Karlsen	22 October 2015
37	7	"The End of Everything"	Øystein Karlsen	29 October 2015
38	8	"Kilt, Infidelity and JFK"	Øystein Karlsen	5 November 2015
39	9	"Self Therapy"	Tuva Novotny	12 November 2015
40	10	"He Is Back"	Øystein Karlsen	19 November 2015

== Broadcast ==
Dag was first broadcast in Norway on TV 2 (Norway). Sveriges Television began showing the series in Sweden 18 October 2011. Yle Fem started broadcasting the programme in Finland in 2013. In the United Kingdom, it was first shown on Sky Arts in 2015.
