= Kåre Conradi =

Norwegian actor

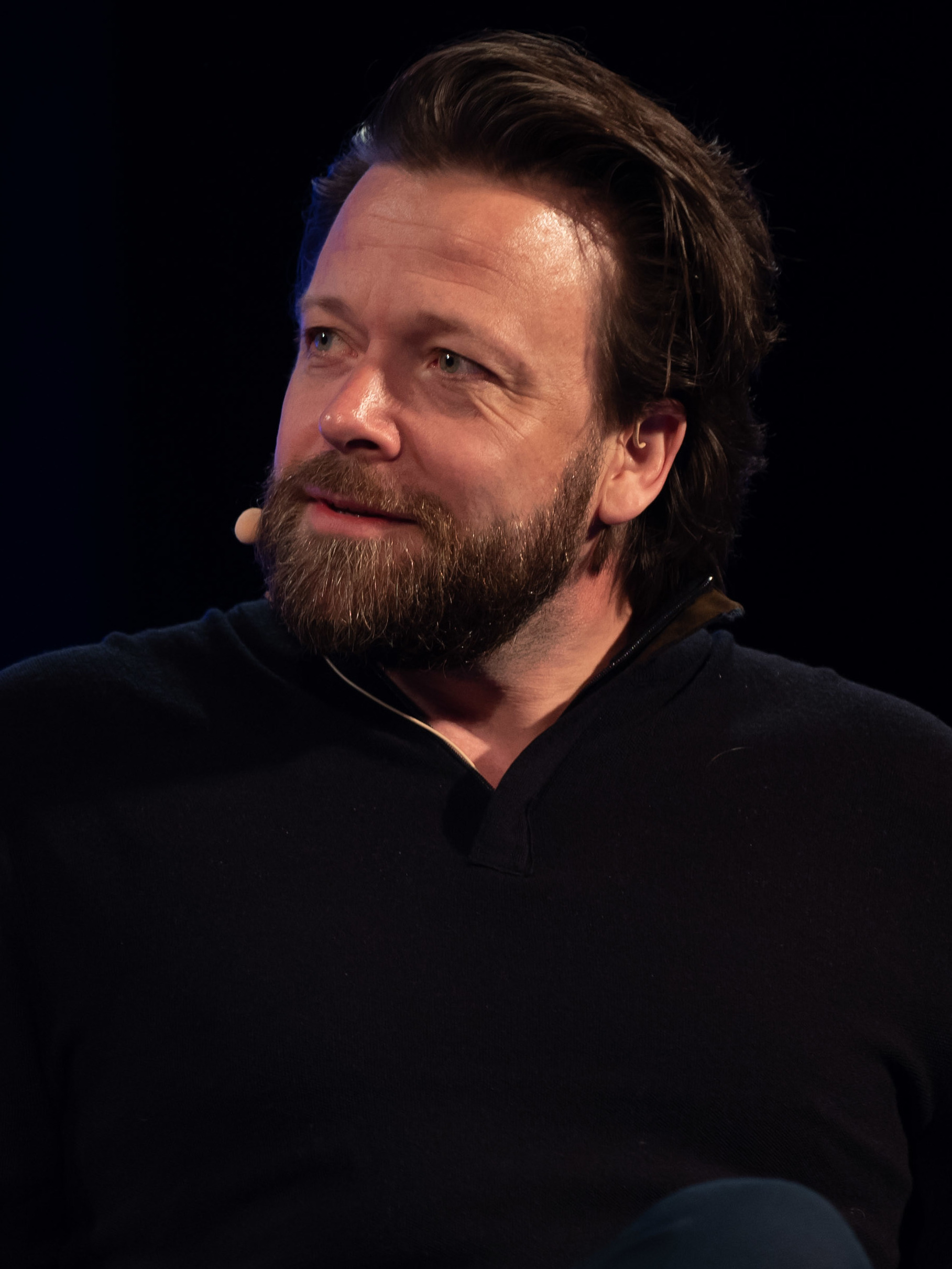
- Conradi in 2018
- Born: 11 January 1972 (age 54); Asker, Norway
- Education: Norwegian Theatre Academy; London Academy of Music and Dramatic Art
- Partner: Lene Marlin (2007–present)
- Children: 1

Kåre Conradi (born 11 January 1972) is a Norwegian actor.

Conradi was born in Asker and he is a graduate of the Norwegian Theatre Academy and the London Academy of Music and Dramatic Art. He made his stage debut at Oslo Nye Teater in 1989, was employed at the Nationaltheatret from 1995, and also had a stint at Trøndelag Teater. In 2016, he won a Hedda Award for best male actor.

On television, Conradi has appeared in Clique, W1A, Heimebane (Home Ground) and Shetland among other roles. He starred in Norwegian historical comedy Norsemen from 2016 to 2020.

== Personal life ==
Conradi has been in a relationship with Lene Marlin, an artist and a songwriter, since 2007. Their daughter was born in October 2020.

== Works ==
Films

- Coco (2018 Norwegian dub), Ernesto de la Cruz
- Solan og Ludvig - Herfra til Flåklypa, Frimand Pløsen
- Solan og Ludvig – Jul i Flåklypa, Frimand Pløsen
- Kong Curling, Stefan Ravndal
- Svik, Svein Nordanger
- Den siste revejakta, Glenn
- Wide Blue Yonder (post production), Ben
- 37 og et halvt, Sigurd
- Spirit – Hingsten fra Cimarron, som Spirit og Forteller
- Katteprinsen, som prins Luna
- 1732 Høtten, Finken Hartmann
- Salige er de som tørster, Henriksen

Television

- Plebs: Soldiers of Rome (2022)
- Aldri voksen (2020) as Sondre
- Vikingane (Norsemen) 2016-2020 as Orm
- Erobreren as Jonas Wergeland
- Kodenavn Hunter as Øystein Sæther
- Gutta Boys as Bjørn Tores far
- SMS - sju magiske sirkler as Morten
- Tiden før Tim (ukjent antall episoder)
- Fjortis as Klasseforestander
- Sofies verden as Hamlet
- Blind gudinne as Erik Henriksen
- Hotell Oslo as Kjetil
- Dag 1

Stage

- Little Eyolf (2018) as Alfred Allmers.
