= Comrade Pedersen =

2006 Norwegian drama film

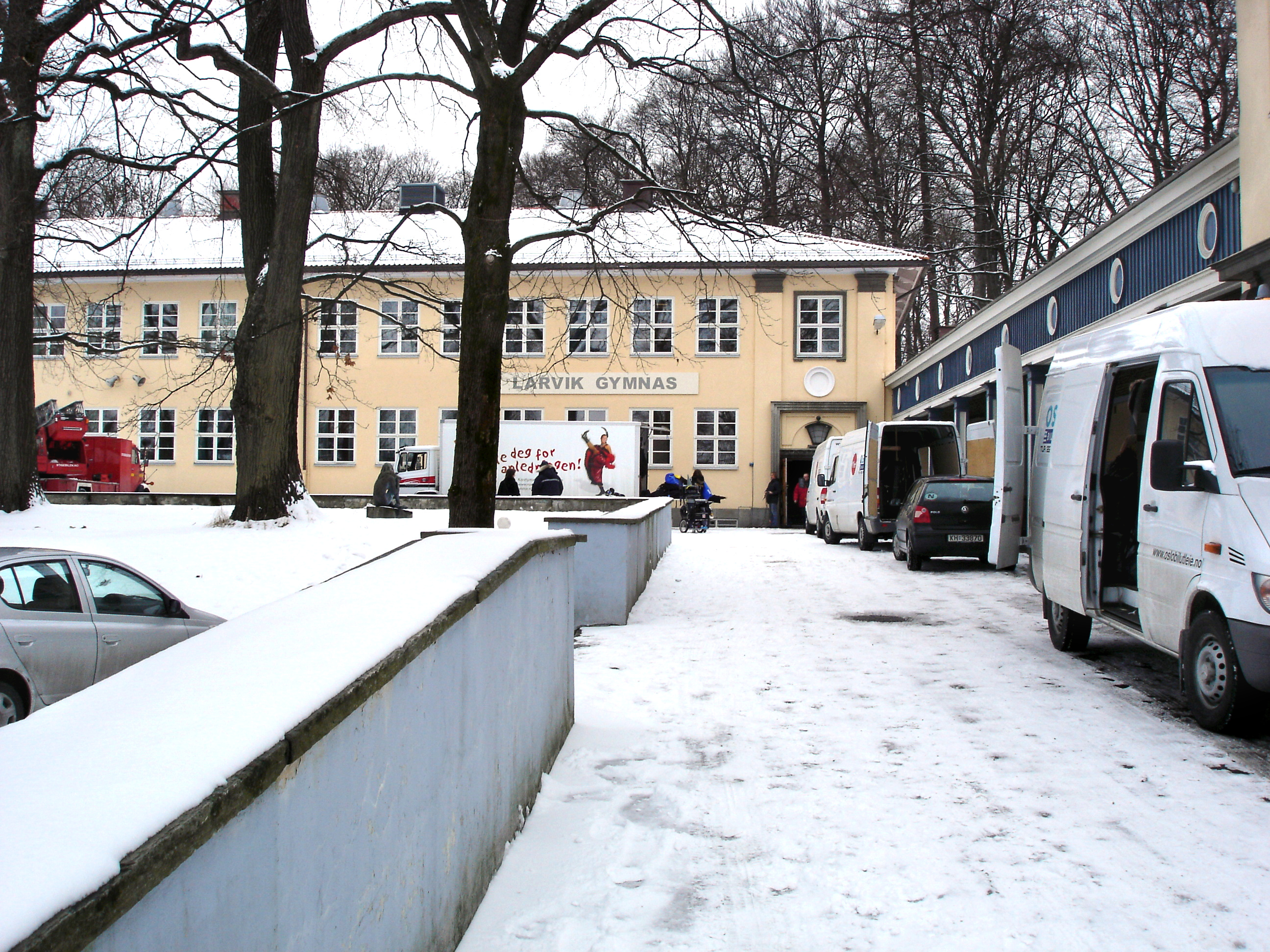
- Berg Upper Secondary School, where the film was shot, during the production.
- Directed by: Hans Petter Moland
- Screenplay by: Hans Petter Blad
- Based on: Gymnaslærer Pedersens beretning om den store politiske vekkelse som har hjemsøkt vårt land by Dag Solstad
- Produced by: Ørjan Karlsen
- Cinematography: Philip Øgaard
- Edited by: Pål Gengenbach
- Music by: Halfdan E
- Production company: Motlys
- Release date: 24 February 2006
- Running time: 123 minutes
- Country: Norway
- Language: Norwegian

Comrade Pedersen (Norwegian: Gymnaslærer Pedersen) is a 2006 Norwegian drama film directed by Hans Petter Moland, starring Kristoffer Joner and Ane Dahl Torp. It is set in the late 1960s and 1970s and tells the story of a high-school teacher who tries to settle down in a small industrial town and gets caught up in the then trending Marxist-Leninist movement in Norway. The film is an adaptation of Dag Solstad's 1982 novel Gymnaslærer Pedersens beretning om den store politiske vekkelse som har hjemsøkt vårt land ("Gymnasium teacher Pedersen's report on the great political awakening that has haunted our country").

The film premiered on 24 February 2006. Moland received the Best Director award at the Montreal World Film Festival. Dahl Torp received the prize for Best Actress at the 2006 Amanda Awards.

== Cast ==
- Kristoffer Joner as school teacher Knut Pedersen
- Ane Dahl Torp as Nina Skåtøy
- Anne Ryg as Lise Tanner
- Jan Gunnar Røise as Werner Ludal
- Stig Henrik Hoff as Jan Klåstad
- Fridtjov Såheim as Gunnar Bøe
- Silje Torp as Anne Britt Bru
- Jon Øigarden as Harald Tholfsen
- Elin Sogn as Unni Langmoen
- Henriette Steenstrup as Mrs. Bøe
- Robert Skjærstad as Unni Langmoen's husband
- Linn Skåber as principal
