= Zak Shaikh =

Zak Shaikh is a screenwriter and consultant. He is best known for his work on Sullivan & Son as well as his work at Attentional Inc. He lives in Hollywood, California.

== Personal life ==
Shaikh was born in Manchester and is of Pakistani and Indian descent. He grew up in London and attended Chigwell School. Shaikh then went to the London School of Economics from 1996 to 1999. He briefly worked in investment banking for Goldman Sachs before turning his interests to writing. Shaikh began the University of Southern California's Screenwriting Program in 2001 and graduated in 2004. He has been published in LA Weekly, Fast Company Magazine, Reuters, C21 Magazine and the Royal Television Society magazines. He is also a partner at entertainment consulting firm, Attentional Inc., which advises major broadcasters, studios and producers on content strategy. His clients there include NBC, and BBC Worldwide.

Shaikh regularly speaks at entertainment industry events and conferences, and is considered and expert on the industry.

Currently, Shaikh is represented by the Paradigm Talent Agency.

== Career ==
Shaikh was a staff writer on the TBS series Sullivan & Son from 2012 to 2013. He has written for Starz’s HEAD CASE. His one-hour pilot Runaways was set up at Fox 21 Television Studios with Gary Randall as the producer.

He is also known for producing the short film, Who Loves the Sun, which won the CINE Golden Eagle Award for Best Dramatic Short in 2007.

Shaikh's work in films includes his winning the Writers Guild of America’s Feature Access Project with his screenplay The Ignoble Rise of Lord Rex.

He has written numerous screenplay adaptations including his 2011 adaptation of Stephen Fry’s novel The Liar with support from the European Union’s MEDIA fund. In 2010, Shaikh adapted A Matter of Honour, the best-selling novel of renowned British novelist Jeffrey Archer. In the same year, he co-adapted BBC journalist John Simpson's memoirs Strange Places: Questionable People into the feature film CANNON FODDER, about British mercenary activity in late 1970s Southern Africa.

As of 2015, he is developing a series about Extradition with Frank Spotnitz as executive producer.
