= Garorock =

Annual multi-genre music festival held in France

- Genre: Pop, electro, EDM, rap
- Begins: 1997
- Frequency: Annually
- Locations: Plaine de la Filhole, 47200 Marmande, France
- Coordinates: 44° 29′ 23″ North, 0° 09′ 48″ East
- Country: France
- Founders: Ludovic Larbodie, Pascal Mignot (alias Calou), Frédéric Vilcocq
- Capacity: 50,000-120,000
- Organiser: MR Power (until 2018) Olympia Production (since Oct 2018)
- Website: http://www.garorock.com

Garorock is an annual multi-genre music festival held in Marmande, Lot-et-Garonne, France. Founded in 1997, it has grown from a regional gathering with a strong alternative and rock identity into one of France’s major open-air festivals, featuring international headliners across rock, pop, electronic, hip-hop, and indie. The event typically takes place over several days in late June or early July and attracts tens of thousands of attendees.

Some of the artists who have performed at the festival include Public Enemy, Babyshambles, David Guetta, Macklemore, Method Man and Redman, The Offspring, Shaka Ponk, Lomepal, and Cypress Hill.

== History ==
The festival was founded in March 1997 in the former slaughterhouses of Marmande. Its name, Garorock, is a pun blending "Garonne" and "Rock," while also suggesting the warning: "Beware of Rock" (Gare au Rock).

The first edition featured only a few bands. As the lineup expanded, the festival was moved to the Plaine de la Filhole, a less urban area.

In October 2018, Olympia Production, a subsidiary of the Vivendi group, acquired the entire company that organizes the festival and thus became its owner.

In April 2024, Garorock was acquired by the German group CTS Eventim, the "largest festival producer in Europe."

== Artists (selection) ==
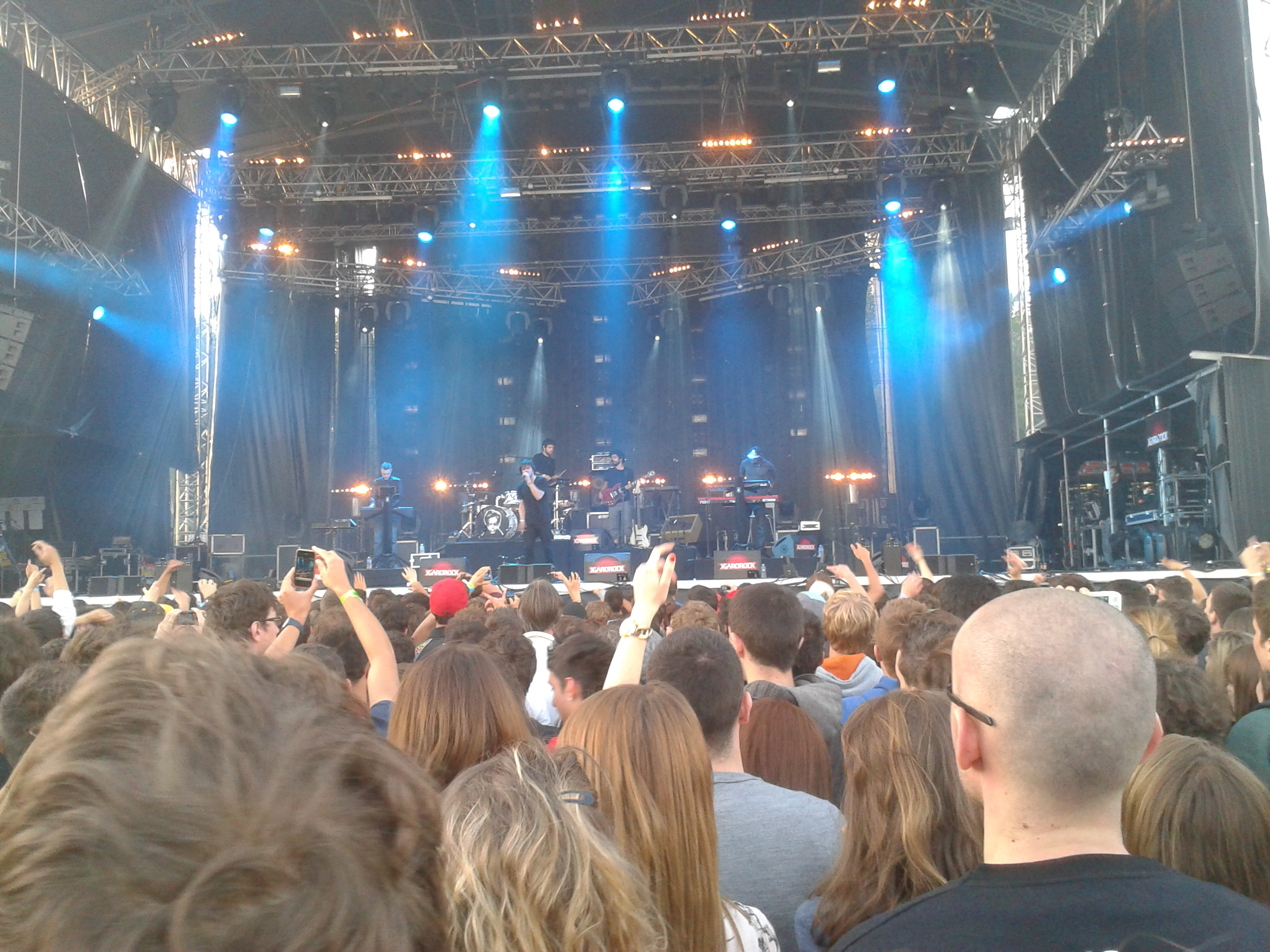
Orelsan on Friday, June 8, 2012, on the Scène de la Plaine during the 2012 edition of Garorock in Marmande.

1997: Le Sheriff, Les Wampas, Headcleaner, Banlieue Rouge

1998: Celtas Cortos, Fermin Muguruza, Ludwig von 88, Flor del Fango

1999: Matmatah, Fabulous Trobadors, Linton Kwesi Johnson, The Skatalites

2000: U-Roy, Les Caméléons, Marcel et son orchestre

2001: Chokebore, La Ruda, Pigzwilltoast, Watcha

2002: Mass Hysteria, Les Wampas, Babylon Circus, Burning Heads

2003: Ska-P, Les Ogres de Barback, Lofofora, High Tone

2004: Freestylers, Nomeansno, Mardi Gras.bb, Enhancer

2005: Max Romeo, Popa Chubby, DJ Vadim, Mano Solo

2006: Les Ogres de Barback, Têtes Raides, Seeed

2007: Public Enemy, !!!, Deftones, Digitalism, Vitalic

2008: Method Man & Redman, Birdy Nam Nam, CocoRosie

2009: Ice Cube, Babyshambles, Radio Moscow, Keziah Jones

2010: De La Soul, Mos Def, The Bloody Beetroots, Sepultura

2011: The Streets, Crookers, Raekwon, Apocalyptica, Magnetic Man

2012: The Offspring, Cypress Hill, NOFX, Metronomy

2013: Paul Kalkbrenner, Iggy Pop, Bloc Party, Mika

2014: Phoenix, Franz Ferdinand, Massive Attack, Skrillex

2015: ASAP Rocky, Die Antwoord, Tale Of Us, Alt-J

2016: Muse, Disclosure, Ratatat, The Hives, Jamie xx

2017: Justice, Phoenix, M.I.A., Foals, London Grammar

2018: Indochine, Marilyn Manson, Macklemore, DJ Snake

2019: Marshmello, Ben Harper, DJ Snake, Sum 41, Interpol
