= Tre brødre som ikke er brødre =

Norwegian television series

Tre brødre som ikke er brødre (meaning Three brothers who aren't brothers) is a Norwegian comedy television show which ran for six episodes during the autumn of 2005 on the Norwegian public broadcaster NRK. It featured noted comedians Harald Eia, Bård Tufte Johansen, and Atle Antonsen.
