= Lille Lørdag =

Norwegian sketch comedy television program

- Created by: Harald Eia; Bård Tufte Johansen
- Starring: Harald Eia; Bård Tufte Johansen
- Country of origin: Norway

Original release
- Network: NRK1
- Release: 1995

Lille Lørdag was a Norwegian sketch comedy television program that ran on the state channel NRK from 1995 until 1996. The show was significant in launching the careers of comedians Harald Eia and Bård Tufte Johansen.
