= Uti vår hage (TV series) =

- Created by: Atle Antonsen; Harald Eia; Bård Tufte Johansen
- Starring: Atle Antonsen; Harald Eia; Bård Tufte Johansen
- Country of origin: Norway
- No. of episodes: 14

Production
- Running time: 28 min

Original release
- Network: NRK1
- Release: 11 September 2003 – 23 October 2003; 10 January 2008 – 6 March 2008

Uti vår hage (English: Out in Our Garden, named after a folk song) was a Norwegian sketch comedy television program which had two different runs on TV in 2003 and 2008 on the Norwegian state channel NRK. The show starred the three well-known comedians: Atle Antonsen, Harald Eia and Bård Tufte Johansen. The format of the show was one main storyline that would gradually branch off into several separate minor storylines. Two series of the show have been produced, and the second series carries the title Uti vår hage 2. The show has introduced popular characters like "Lena" from Døden på Oslo S and "Oslolosen". The first season consisted of six episodes and was first broadcast in September and October 2003, while the second season was aired in January – March 2008, with seven ordinary episodes and one special. The first season was the first occasion where the three comedians worked together.
