= Harald Eia =

Norwegian comedian and sociologist

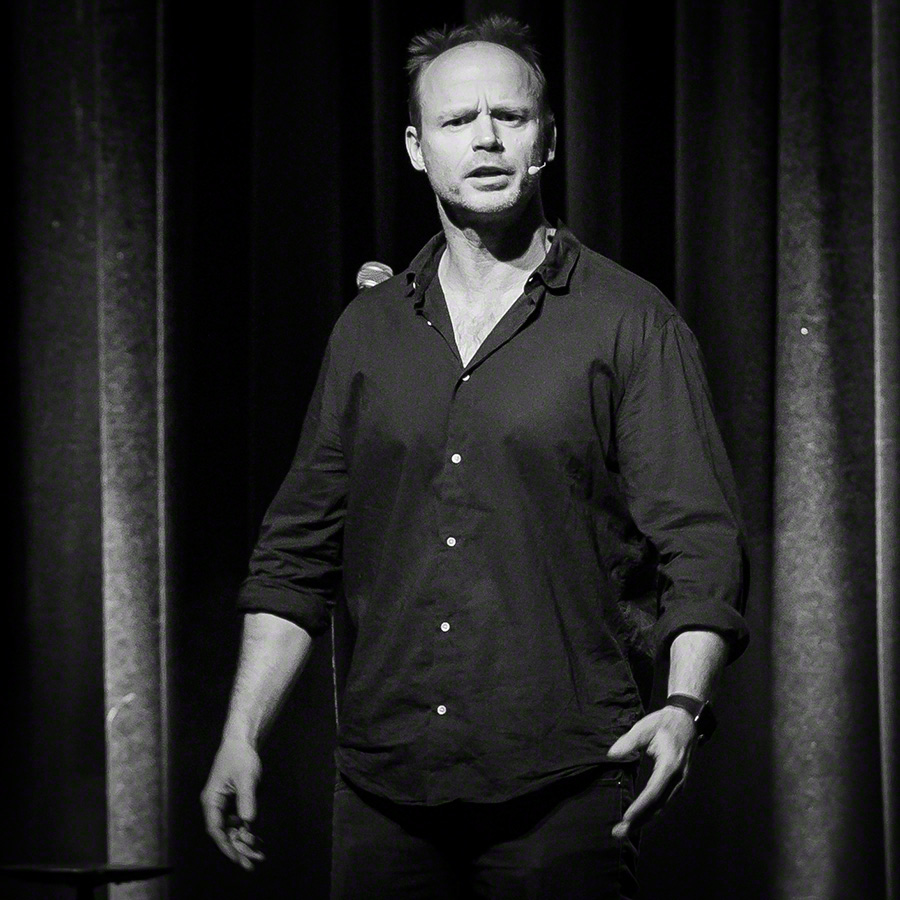
- Eia performing at Parkteatret in 2016
- Born: Harald Meldal Eia; 9 February 1966 (age 60); Bærum, Norway
- Occupations: Comedian, sociologist and documentarian

Harald Meldal Eia (born 9 February 1966) is a Norwegian comedian, and sociologist. In recent years, Eia has also made TV-documentaries and written books.

Eia became a household name in Norway in the mid-90s and has since then been one of country´s most well-known comedians.

== Life and career ==
Eia was born in Bærum. He graduated with a Candidate's degree in sociology at the University of Oslo in 1992, with the thesis Lidende ledere og kompetente kalkulatører. Næringslivsfolks symbolske kamper, which in English translates as Suffering leaders and competent calculators. The symbolic struggles of business people.

Together with Bård Tufte Johansen, he has been author of, and participated in, several successful Norwegian Broadcasting Corporation comedy TV series, such as Lille Lørdag (1995), Åpen Post (1998–2002), Uti vår hage (2003), Team Antonsen (2004), Tre brødre som ikke er brødre (2005), Uti vår hage 2 (2008), and Storbynatt, as well as the radio comedy shows Herreavdelingen (1997) and Tazte priv (2004–2005). Popular characters include "Lena" (a parody of the character from Døden på Oslo S) and Oslolosen. He has also performed stand-up comedy and theatresports and had supporting roles in Norwegian films, including Detector (2000) and United (2003).

In 2010, he introduced a television show called Hjernevask ("Brainwash") which contrasted cultural determinist models of human behavior (also referred to as the Standard social science model) with nature-nurture interactionist perspectives. Several of those who were interviewed for the show, particularly Jørgen Lorentzen, criticized the show publicly both before and after the airing, and this ignited a wide public discussion on the subject of the nature versus nurture debate. Especially the question of gender, and what is referred to as the gender paradox (the fact that although Norwegian women have a high level of participation within the workforce, more so than most countries, the Norwegian job market remains highly segregated in terms of gender) has provoked controversy.

For Hjernevask, he was awarded the Fritt Ord Honorary Award in 2010.

Harald Eia is awarded the Fritt Ord Foundation Tribute for, through the programme Brainwash, having precipitated one of the most heated debates on research in recent times.

— The Fritt Ord Foundation

Since 2017, Eia has, together with Nils Brenna, produced the podcast- and radio-series "Sånn er du", where a famous Norwegian takes a Big 5-personality test for each episode. Eia and Brenna then discuss their way through the results of the personality test together the person who took the test.

In 2020, Eia published a book, together with co-author Ole-Martin Ihle, on why Norway has become so prosperous in recent times.

== List of appearances ==
=== Television ===
Year	Title	Notes
1991	U	
1995–1996	Lille lørdag	with Bård Tufte Johansen
1998–2002	Åpen post	with Bård Tufte Johansen
2003	Uti vår hage	with Bård Tufte Johansen and Atle Antonsen
2004	Team Antonsen	with Bård Tufte Johansen, Atle Antonsen and Kristopher Schau
2005	Tre brødre som ikke er brødre	with Bård Tufte Johansen and Atle Antonsen
2008	Uti vår hage 2	with Bård Tufte Johansen and Atle Antonsen
2010	Hjernevask	documentary series
2010	Storbynatt	with Bård Tufte Johansen
2012	Brille	with Bård Tufte Johansen

=== Filmography ===
Year	Title	Role
1993	The Last Lieutenant (Secondløitnanten)	
1996	Body Troopers (Jakten på nyresteinen)	Tåretankoperatøren
2000	Detector (Detektor)	Ronny
2003	United	Salomonsen

=== Radio ===
Year	Title	Notes
1997	Herreavdelingen	with Bård Tufte Johansen
2004–2005	Tazte priv	with Bård Tufte Johansen
2017-	Sånn er du	with Nils Brenna
