= Bård Tufte Johansen =

Norwegian comedian (born 1969)

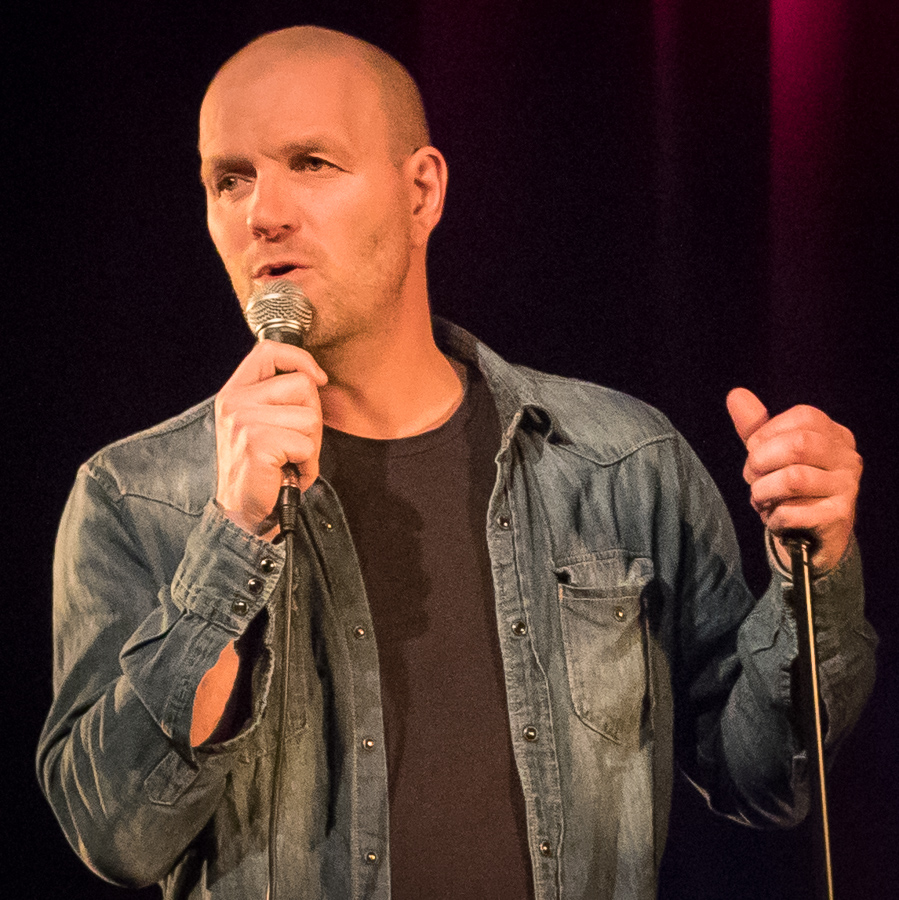
- Johansen as stand-up comedian in 2017
- Born: 19 June 1969 (age 56); Skien, Norway
- Occupation: Comedian

Bård Tufte Johansen (born 19 June 1969 in Skien) is a Norwegian comedian.

Together with Harald Eia, he has authored and participated in several successful NRK TV series, such as U:Natt (1994), starring with Monotelevision, Lille Lørdag (1995), Åpen post (1998–2002), Uti vår hage (2003), Team Antonsen (2004), Tre brødre som ikke er brødre (2005), Ut i vår hage 2 (2008) and Storbynatt (2010). In 2004–2005 Johansen and Eia had a radio-show called Tazte priv.

In 2003 Johansen starred in the Norwegian movie Lille Frøken Norge. He has also done stand-up comedy. In the years 1988–1990 he was the vocalist of Norwegian progressive rock band Utopian Fields.

Although most people regard his humor as intelligent, he has raised controversy several times. In 2002 Bård Tufte Johansen, representing Åpen post, mocked the media's double standards when the Norwegian Labour Party leader Thorbjørn Jagland was hospitalised after sustained media pressure. Behind the TV reporter reporting live from outside the hospital, Tufte Johansen jumped around in a chicken costume, cackling about media's treatment of Thorbjørn Jagland. This raised significant controversy in Norway.
