= Kristopher Schau =

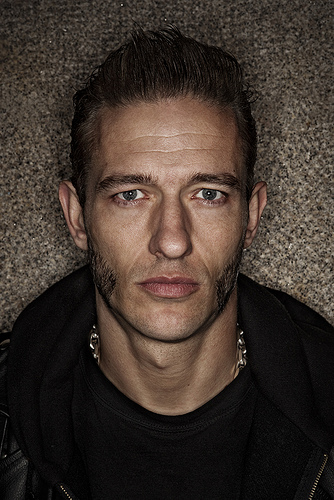

Background information
- Also known as: Max Cargo, Farbror Blå
- Born: Kristopher Hugh Martin Schau; 12 August 1970 (age 55)
- Origin: Oslo, Norway
- Genres: Heavy metal, Death n roll, Hardcore punk, Comedy rock, Thrash metal
- Instruments: Vocals, guitar, percussion, trumpet

Kristopher Hugh Martin Schau (born 12 August 1970) is a Norwegian musician, TV host, comedian, author, and songwriter. He was born in Oslo.

== Radio and television shows ==
Schau is known from several radio shows (most of them also with his brother Alexander Schau) including XL, Karate, and Et Norge I Krig. On TV he has been involved in the shows XLTV, Team Antonsen (2004), and De 7 dødssyndene (2007). He has also been part of several bands, among them Gartnerlosjen, Hurra Torpedo, Kåper Gjete, Sinsen, Reidar Roses Orkester, Datsun, The Cumshots, Mongo Ninja, White Urine and The Dogs. He is also the writer of the Norwegian underground comic Margarin which is now discontinued. He has created the television shows Dag and One Night with his friend Øystein Karlsen.

=== De 7 dødssyndene ===
In 2007, Schau launched his television show, De 7 dødssyndene, focusing on the seven deadly sins. In the show, Schau attempted to commit all the deadly sins, combined with Schau and his co-hosts, Øystein Karlsen and Morten Ståle Nilsen, presenting information on the history of sin and related subjects. Many Norwegian conservative Christians protested against the program with the paper Dagen being central. They organized a petition and a boycott against the show's corporate sponsors, leading to several companies dropping their advertisements. This did not decrease the show's popularity.

== Performance art ==
One of his projects had him living in a brown Opel Rekord automobile for a whole week in 1998. This event was also televised in daily segments.

Another one of his projects was "Forfall" (en. Decline), where Schau devoted an entire week in 2001 to living as unhealthily as possible while his blood, urin and sperm was examined by medical professionals before, during and after. The original idea was to deteriorate fast both physically and mentally; despite the initial intentions in the mental area (reading books by Norwegian pulp fiction authors), however, the project mainly focused on eating unhealthy foods and smoking. He spent the entire week on display in an Oslo shop window on the busy Karl Johans street. The project was also shown on TV and streamed on the internet for the entire week. He gained about 10 kg (22 lbs) and his cholesterol level skyrocketed during the project. He also nearly suffered a heatstroke when the temperature in the shop window display was significantly increased. The heat experiment was then aborted.

In 2007 he travelled to Israel and was "persuaded" into being circumcised after which he fried and ate his own foreskin. This was supposed to be part of his Seven deadly sins TV-series, but was censored at the time.

== Court case ==
During the 2004 Quartfestival, a couple, who were both members of Fuck for Forest, had sex on stage during a concert with The Cumshots, a band fronted by Schau. This led to a lawsuit against Schau, the other band members and the couple who performed the sex stunt. Schau and his bandmate Ole Petter Andreassen were both fined 10,000 NOK for their roles in the stunt.

== Podcasts ==
From around 2019 and ongoing he has started a few podcasts in companionship with others focusing on literature, philosophy, books and science.

== Authorship ==
- 2009 - On behalf of friends - about death and loneliness where the author frequented and documented funerals for people who died without known relatives and friends to take care of the funeral. He was often the only one besides a priest and the undertaker staff to visit them. The book received critical acclaim with words such as gonzo-journalistic, sympathetic, empathetic, absurd and tragicomic being used.
- 2012 - Court notes from the 22 July terror legal proceedings - a collection in book form of the articles the author wrote for the newspaper Morgenbladet on 22 July 2011 Norway terror attacs.
- 2016 - Oslo - Lillehammer - Hamburg - where the author and Ingvar Ambjørnsen recorded their conversation on two long car trips and put this in book form.
