= List of Norwegian films of the 1990s =

Films produced in Norway in the 1990s:

== 1990s ==
Title	Director	Cast	Genre	Notes
1990
Døden på Oslo S	Eva Isaksen	Håvard Bakke, Tommy Karlsen	Action / crime / drama	
Herman	Erik Gustavson		Drama / family	Based on Lars Saabye Christensen's novel of the same name.; The Norwegian entry to the Academy Award for Best Foreign Language Film in 1991.
Shipwrecked	Nils Gaup	Gabriel Byrne, Bjørn Sundquist	Adventure / family	Released in the U.S. in a dubbed English-language version by Walt Disney Pictures.
1991
Frida – Straight from the Heart	Berit Nesheim	Helge Jordal	Drama / comedy	The Norwegian entry to the Academy Award for Best Foreign Language Film in 1992.
Motýlí cas (The Flying Sneaker)	Břetislav Pojar	Ludek Navratil, Katerina Machácková, Jaromír Hanzlík, Lubor Tokos, Katka Pokorna, Vlastimil Brodský	Drama / fantasy	
The Polar Bear King	Ola Solum	Jack Fjeldstad, Maria Bonnevie, Tobias Hoesl, Monica Nordquist	Fantasy	
1992
Bat Wings	Emil Stang Lund			Entered into the 18th Moscow International Film Festival
Warrior's Heart	Leidulv Risan	Thomas Kretschmann, Anneke von der Lippe, Bjørn Sundquist	Drama / romance / war	The Norwegian entry to the Academy Award for Best Foreign Language Film in 1993 and screened at Cannes.
1993
Beyond the Sky	Berit Nesheim		Drama / family	
Hodet over vannet	Nils Gaup		Comedy	
The Last Lieutenant	Hans Petter Moland	Espen Skjønberg	Drama / war	
The Telegraphist	Erik Gustavson	Bjørn Floberg, Marie Richardson, Bjørn Sundquist	Drama	Based on the Knut Hamsund novel Dreamers.; The Norwegian entry to the Academy Award for Best Foreign Language Film in 1994.; Entered into the 43rd Berlin International Film Festival.
1994
Cross My Heart and Hope to Die (film)	Marius Holst	Martin Dahl Garfalk, Jan Devo Kornstad, Kjersti Holmen, Bjørn Sundquist, Bjørn Floberg	Drama / mystery	Won the "Blue Angel" award and was nominated to the Golden Bear at the 45th Berlin International Film Festival; The Norwegian entry to the Academy Award for Best Foreign Language Film in 1995.
Dreamplay	Unni Straume			Screened at the 1994 Cannes Film Festival
Du Pappa	René Bjerke	Håkon Bolstad, Benedikte Lindbeck, Nils Ole Oftebro	Drama / family / adolescence	Won the "Grand Jury Prize", "Press Award" and award for "Best Actress" at the 1994 Rouen Nordic Film Festival.; Won the "Grand Prix" at the Rencontre Cinematographique in Cannes.
Stork Staring Mad	Eva Isaksen	Anneke von der Lippe, Johannes Joner, Dennis Storhøi	Drama / comedy	
1995
Eggs	Bent Hamer		Drama / comedy	Winner of the "Best Film" award at the Amanda awards in 1995. Entered into the 19th Moscow International Film Festival
Kristin Lavransdatter	Liv Ullmann	Elisabeth Matheson, Jørgen Langhelle, Sverre Anker Ousdal	Drama	The Norwegian entry to the Academy Award for Best Foreign Language Film in 1996.
Zero Kelvin	Hans Petter Moland	Stellan Skarsgård		Winner of the "Best Film" award at the Amanda awards in 1996.
The Sunset Boys / Waiting for Sunset	Leidulv Risan	Robert Mitchum, Cliff Robertson, Espen Skjønberg	Drama	
1996
Aldri mer 13!	Sirin Eide	Sofie Cappelen	Drama / family	
Hamsun	Jan Troell	Max von Sydow, Ghita Nørby, Gard B. Eidsvold, Sverre Anker Ousdal, Jesper Christensen	Biography / drama	Scandinavian co-production
Jakten på nyresteinen	Vibeke Idsøe	Kjersti Holmen, Harald Eia	Family / fantasy	
The Other Side of Sunday	Berit Nesheim	Marie Theisen, Bjørn Sundquist	Drama / comedy	Nominated to Academy Award for Best Foreign Language Film in 1997.
1997
Insomnia	Erik Skjoldbjærg	Stellan Skarsgård, Sverre Anker Ousdal, Bjørn Floberg	Thriller / drama	This movie was remade in 2002 as the film Insomnia, directed by Christopher Nolan, starring Al Pacino and Robin Williams.
Junk Mail	Pål Sletaune	Robert Skjærstad, Andrine Sæther	Comedy / thriller	The Norwegian entry to the Academy Award for Best Foreign Language Film in 1998.
Isle of Darkness	Trygve Allister Diesen	Sofie Gråbøl, Paul Ottar Haga	Thriller	
1998
1732 Høtten	Karin Julsrud	Reidar Sørensen, Stig Henrik Hoff	Thriller	
Cellophan	Eva Isaksen	Andrine Sæther, Sverre Anker Ousdal	Thriller	
Only Clouds Move the Stars	Torun Lian	Thea Sofie Rusten, Jan Tore Kristoffersen, Anneke von der Lippe	Drama	Winner of the "Best Film" award at the Amanda awards in 1999.; The Norwegian entry to the Academy Award for Best Foreign Language Film in 1999.
1999
Absolute Hangover	Petter Næss	Ingar Helge Gimle, Brit Elisabeth Haagensli, Per Christian Ellefsen, Gard B. Eidsvold, Anette Hoff	Comedy / drama	
The Prompter	Hilde Heier	Hege Schøyen, Sven Nordin	Comedy / drama / romance	The Norwegian entry to the Academy Award for Best Foreign Language Film in 2000.
Sophie's World	Erik Gustavson	Silje Storstein, Tomas von Brömssen, Andrine Sæther, Nils Vogt	Drama / philosophical	Based on the Jostein Gaarder novel Sophie's World.
