= Giftige løgner =

1992 Norwegian film by Martin Asphaug

- Directed by: Martin Asphaug
- Written by: Axel Hellstenius
- Based on: Ingvar Ambjørnsen's novel Giftige løgner
- Starring: Håvard Bakke; Tommy Karlsen; Helle Beck Figenschow
- Cinematography: Philip Øgaard
- Edited by: Torleif Hauge
- Music by: Jørn Christensen
- Distributed by: Norsk Film AS
- Release date: February 20, 1992
- Running time: 86 minutes
- Country: Norway
- Language: Norwegian
- Box office: NOK10.1 million

Giftige løgner (Lethal Lies or Poisonous Lies) is a Norwegian film from 1992 directed by Martin Asphaug. It is based on Ingvar Ambjørnsen's novel of the same name, which is part of the series Pelle og Proffen. The film is mostly set in Kragerø.

== Plot ==
Lena, Pelle's girlfriend, has spent 16 months in a rehab clinic and now lives in the fictional town of Steinsund in Southern Norway. One weekend, Pelle and Proffen make a surprise visit, which results in complications between Pelle and Lena. At the same time, Proffen falls in love with Gerd, who is active in the local Nature and Youth club. They are working hard to find out who is behind the pollution of the beautiful Steinsund Fjord. To help Gerd, Proffen brings Pelle with him, and together they decide to put the villains behind bars.

== Cast ==
- Håvard Bakke as Pelle
- Tommy Karlsen as Proffen
- Helle Beck Figenschow as Lena
- Synnøve Nygaard as Gerd
- Viggo Jønsberg as the father
- Brit Elisabeth Haagensli as the mother
- Hildegun Riise as Åsa
- Terje Rangnes as Tom
- Jesper Siegfried Enerstvedt as Finn

== Films in the series ==
- 1990: Døden på Oslo S
- 1992: Giftige løgner
- 1993: De blå ulvene
