= Frank Kjosås =

Norwegian actor

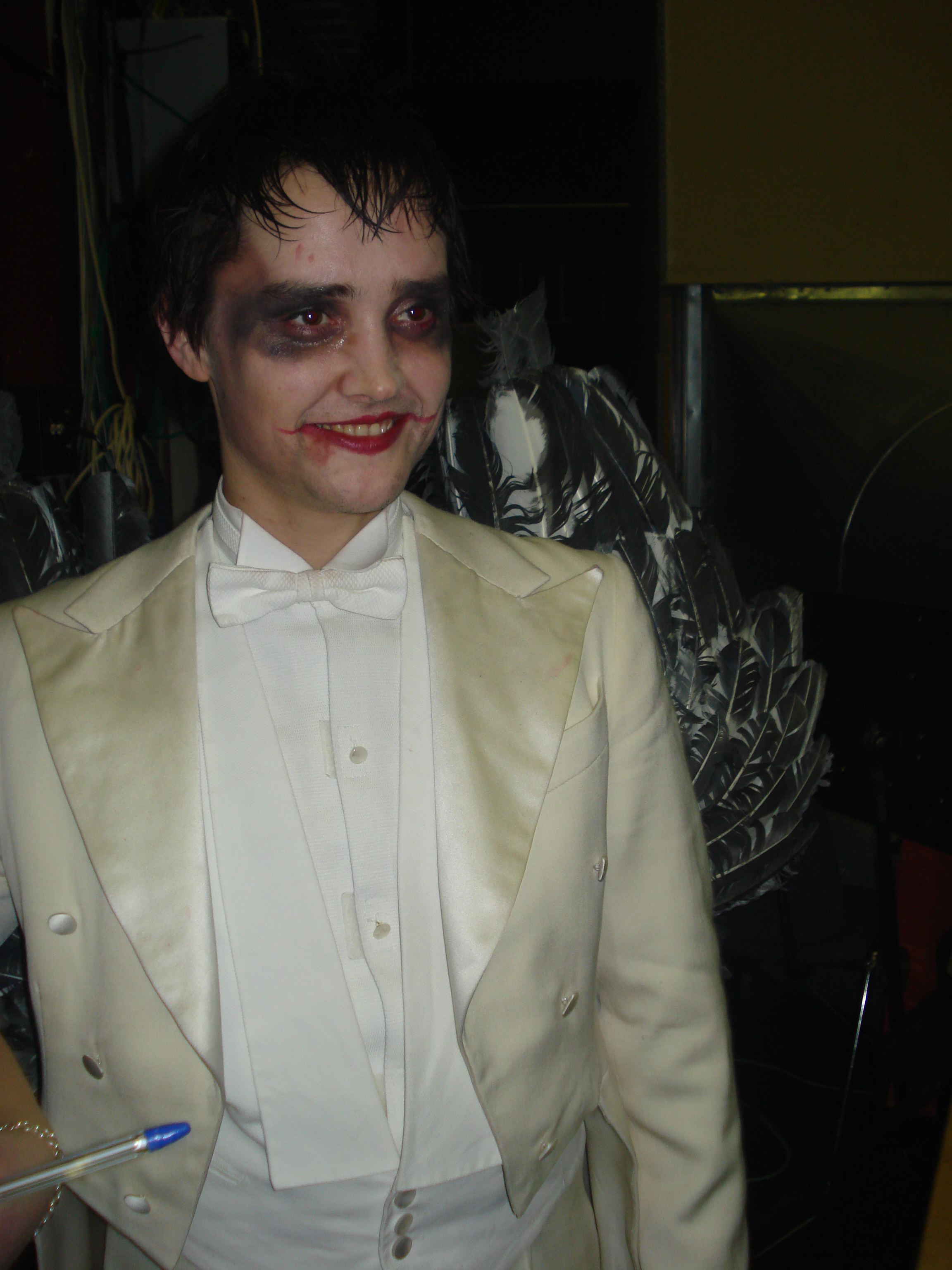
- Born: 28 July 1981 (age 44); Øystese in Hardanger, Norway
- Occupation: Actor
- Spouse: Marie Blokhus (2011 - 2016)

Frank Kjosås (born 28 July 1981) is a Norwegian actor of theatre and film, known for The Half Brother, and his role as Norwegian resistance soldier Knut Haukelid in The Heavy Water War.

== Early life ==
Frank Kjosås was born in Øystese in Hardanger. He has two brothers and three sisters. He decided to become an actor aged 15, when he saw a production of Jesus Christ Superstar in Øystese. He attended Romerike Folk High School, Bårdar Dance Institute, and from 2003–2006, the Norwegian National Academy of Theatre.

== Career ==
In his third year at the Norwegian National Academy of Theatre, he was cast in the role as Woof in the musical Hair by Det Norske Teatret, and has been permanently employed by the theatre ever since. His had his first film role in 37 1/2 (2005), a comedy-drama, and got his big break in 2008 with House of Fools and Troubled Water. However, he was repeatedly told at the Norwegian National Academy of Theatre that, due to his small height (168 cm) and youthful, "feminine" features, he would be severely limited in the roles he could play. In order to counteract this, he sought darker, gritty parts; however, he still encountered difficulty getting varied roles due to what was termed his "androgynous" appearance, and it wasn't until 2013, when he played the starring role of Fred, a boxer, in The Half Brother (for which he received the Gullruten Award 2013 for Best Actor), that he was able to change his image. He currently alternates between theatre, film, musicals, and television. He made his opera debut with Asle og Alida at Bergen National Opera in 2025.

== Filmography ==
=== Theatre ===
Year	Title	Role	Notes
2005	Scrooge (musical)	Young Scrooge	Akershus teater
2006	Hair	Woof	Det Norske Teatret
2007, 2009	Peter Pan	Peter Pan	Det Norske Teatret
2007	Tvillingar	Gut	Det Norske Teatret
2008	Døden i Teben	Haimon	Det Norske Teatret
2008	The Threepenny Opera	Hookfinger-Jakob/Filch	Det Norske Teatret
2008	The Lieutenant of Inishmore	Davey	Det Norske Teatret
2008	Krasnoyarsk	Kreutzberg	Det Norske Teatret
2008, 2010	Evig Ung	Frank	Det Norske Teatret
2009	Jesus Christ Superstar	Judas	Det Norske Teatret
2010, 2011	Next to Normal	Gabe	Det Norske Teatret
2011	Treasure Island	Jim Hawkins	Det Norske Teatret
2011	Sjuk ungdom	Petrell	Det Norske Teatret
2012	Evita	Che	Det Norske Teatret
2012	Hamlet	Prince Hamlet	Hålogaland Teater
2013	Bible	Jesus Christ	Det Norske Teatret
2013	Mein Kampf	Adolf Hitler	Det Norske Teatret
2013	Våre beste musikalar	Various	Det Norske Teatret
2014	Hamlet	Ophelia/Horatio	Det Norske Teatret
2014	Trost i Taklampa	Hjalmar	Det Norske Teatret
2013 - 2015	Shockheaded Peter	Scissor Man & various	Det Norske Teatret
2015 - 2017	The Curious Incident of the Dog in the Night-Time	Christopher	Det Norske Teatret
2015	Sweeney Todd	Sweeney Todd	Det Norske Teatret
2016	If/Then	Lucas	Det Norske Teatret
2016	Rough for theatre/Røff	(?)	Det Norske Teatret
2016	The songbird	Jacoba	Det Norske Teatret
2017	The Book of Mormon	Elder Price	Det Norske Teatret

=== Film & TV ===
Year	Title	Role	Notes
2005	37 1/2	Michelle's boyfriend	Feature film
2007	5 Lies	Stian	Feature film
2007	Elsk din skjebne	Peter	Short film
2008	Varg Veum – Tornerose (Sleeping Beauty)	Peter Werner	
2008	De gales hus	Ruben	
2008	Troubled Water	Tommy	
2009	Kastanjeskogen	Ekorn	Voice
2009	Angel		
2010	Pillows	Angel	Short film
2010	Scene fra et parforhold:#2	Frank Kjosås	Short film
2010	Pagten	Gibbus	Norwegian voice
2011	Rango	Rango	Norwegian voice
2011	Baldguy	Jonas	Short film
2013	The Half Brother	Fred	TV series Gullruten Award 2013 for Best Actor
2013	Lilyhammer	Bamse	TV series
2014	Ta meg med!	Per	Feature film musical
2014	Eyewitness	Raymond	
2015	The Heavy Water War	Knut Haukelid	TV series
2015	Knutsen & Ludvigsen og den fæle Rasputin	Rasputin	Voice
2026	Harry Hole	Willey Barley	
