= Børning =

2014 Norwegian action-comedy film by Hallvard Bræin

- Theatrical release poster
- Directed by: Hallvard Bræin (born 08.10.1965 Volda, Norway)
- Written by: Linn-Jeanette Kyed (born 06.01.1981 Ulefoss, Norway); Christopher Grøndahl; Hallvard Bræin
- Produced by: John M. Jacobsen; Sveinung Golimo; Marcus Brodersen
- Starring: Anders Baasmo Christiansen; Sven Nordin; Otto Jespersen; Jenny Skavlan; Henrik Mestad; Ida Husøy; Trond Halbo
- Cinematography: Askild Edvardsen
- Edited by: Per-Erik Eriksen
- Music by: Magnus Beite
- Production company: Filmkameratene
- Distributed by: SF Norge
- Release date: August 13, 2014
- Running time: 92 minutes
- Country: Norway
- Language: Norwegian

Børning: The Fast & The Fønniest, or simply Børning, is a 2014 Norwegian action-comedy film directed by Hallvard Bræin, written by Linn-Jeanette Kyed from a story by Christopher Grøndahl, based on an idea by Bræin, and produced by Filmkameratene. It takes inspiration from the Fast & Furious film series.

Anders Baasmo Christiansen plays the main character Roy, a man who gets dragged into the biggest illegal car race in Norwegian history. The journey goes through Norway from Oslo to the North Cape. Roy drives a 1967 Ford Mustang fastback with a 302 BOSS engine. The car is called 'Lillegul' (Norwegian for "little yellow"), named after his daughter who had jaundice as an infant.

The film premiered on the 14 August 2014. Two sequels, Børning 2 and Børning 3: Asphalt Burning were released in 2016 and 2020 respectively.

== Plot ==
Roy is a car enthusiast well into his 30s. He only cares about running his company "Stallion Parts" and working on his beloved Ford Mustang "Lillegul", which he drag races occasionally. His daughter Nina lives with her mother in a good bourgeois environment - far from Roy's world.

The conflict starts when Nina out of nowhere shows up to spend her summer vacation with Roy. He cannot remember agreeing to take care of her for the summer. The only thing marked in his calendar is the car drag race "Street legal".

During the prize ceremony after the race, where Roy as the favourite surprisingly did not win due to engine trouble, he is challenged by his arch-enemy TT to an illegal street race to Sinsen. To end the teasing, Roy agrees to race, as long as the race goes from Oslo to North Cape (Norwegian: Nordkapp). There will only be two rules: 1) First to arrive Nordkapp has won, and 2) There are no other rules (except that you can not drive through Sweden).

== Cast ==
Børning cast
Name	Character role
Anders Baasmo Christiansen	Roy
Ida Husøy (born 2000)	Nina
Sven Nordin	Doffen
Otto Jespersen	Nybakken
Jenny Skavlan	Sylvia
Henrik Mestad	Philip Mørk
Trond Halbo (born 12.03.1977)	TT
Oskar Sandven Lundevold (born 30.08.1996)	Jimmy
Camilla Frey (born 10.06.1981)	Linda
Marie Blokhus	Ingrid Lykke
Anita Eriksen	Hanne Gundersen
Steinar Sagen	Police officer Steinar
Lars Arentz-Hansen	Lawyer
Arne Reitan	Chief police officer Mindor Hammer
Marcelo Galván	Carlos Miguel
Gudmund Groven	Bingo-Truls
Trine Wiggen	Sonja Lykke
Zahid Ali	Salvador
Shakil Khan	Kenneth
Jo P. Andersen	Knut
Jeppe Beck Laursen	Rusten
Jepser Malm	Svensken
Per Hustad	Speaker
Mads Bones	Sveinung
Trygve Svindland	Police officer Osvald
Rune Løding	Car glass employee
Hilde-Yvonne Smelror	Radio hostess
Klaudia Burman	Babe
Annette Soknes	Babe
Nathalie Lao	Babe
Lisa Marie Winther	Babe
Dora Marble	Babe
Thea Follestad	Babe

== Reception ==
=== Box office ===
Børning was successful in the Norwegian box office, and in 2014 became the most viewed Norwegian movie, and the second most viewed movie of the year with over 380,000 viewers. The production company executed a well-planned release campaign through using social media, involving the cast, and contacts in the local car communities. The movie had a lot of publicity for a long time through social media, press and advertising.

=== Critical reception ===
"The story is probably not the most advanced, but what do you expect from a movie promoted as "The Fast and the Funniest"? You want fast cars and funny characters, something that director Hallvard Bræin proves to be fully capable of delivering"
— Birger Vestmo of NRK P3's Filmpolitiet in his review of Børning.

Børning received mixed to positive reviews from critics.

Aksel Kielland described the film as a formulaic and fundamentally unambitious film that does not quite reach up, but which just fully possesses a level of charm rarely seen in Norwegian films of this type. He confessed that he rather prefers Børning to the film with the most in common of the year, namely Scott Waugh's Need for Speed, which premiered in March 2014. At the premiere, he rated the film 4/6, but in a later comment said he would rate it 3/6 after having some days to think about the movie.

"Børning manifests itself to be Norway's first real car movie, and it kicks off with great force. The great interaction between the people in front and behind of the camera helps lift the film to reach the level it deserves" is the words of the film reviewer Fredrik Olsen Hagstrøm at Kinomagasinet. He praises the combination of scenic locations, great sound design and a lot of funny comments throughout the movie.

=== Accolades ===
Børning has won 4 out of 6 Amanda Award nominations, and 1 out of 2 Kanonprisen award nominations.

List of award nominations
Year	Award	Category	Result
2015	Amanda Award	Best Norwegian feature film	Winner
2015	Amanda Award	Best sound design	Winner
2015	Amanda Award	Best male supporting role	Winner
2015	Amanda Award	People's choice award	Winner
2015	Amanda Award	Best visual effects	Nominee
2015	Amanda Award	Best female supporting role	Nominee
2015	Kanonprisen	People's choice award	Winner
2015	Kanonprisen	Best producer	Nominee

== Follow-ups ==
=== Sequels ===
Børning 2 was announced in November 2015, with production start February 2016. After two years in prison for participating in the illegal street race to Nordkapp, Roy finally gets out of prison. He is invited to a new illegal street race, this time during the winter, going from Bergen to Murmansk in the north of Russia, but he declines. That is until he hears that his daughter will be attending the race together with her boyfriend. The premiere was on 12 October 2016, and it was the most successful premiere weekend of the year in Norway, with over 212,000 viewers in five days. Børning 2 was the third most seen film in 2016 in Norwegian box offices with over 438,000 viewers. The movie has an approximate total budget of $2,500,000.

Børning 3 – Asphalt Burning was announced in February 2018, and premiered in 2020. In Børning 3, the journey goes to Germany, ending in a wild race on the world known racing track Nürburgring. The movie has an approximate total budget of $6,000,000.

=== Swedish remake ===
Director Edward af Sillén's film Ett sista race (2023) is an adaptation of Børning, based on the Norwegian film, but rewritten for the Swedish audience, and starring Malin Akerman and David Hellenius.
