= Børning 2 =

- Theatrical release poster
- Directed by: Hallvard Bræin
- Written by: Linn-Jeanette Kyed; Christopher Grøndahl; Anne Elvedal
- Produced by: John M. Jacobsen; Sveinung Golimo; Marcus Brodersen
- Starring: Anders Baasmo Christiansen; Sven Nordin; Otto Jespersen; Jenny Skavlan; Henrik Mestad; Ida Husøy; Marie Blokhus; Vegar Hoel; Jonas Hoff Oftebro; Lise Karlsnes; Robert Skjærstad; Klaus Sonstad; Stig Frode Henriksen; Mikkel Gaup; Geir Schau
- Cinematography: Askild Edvardsen
- Edited by: Per-Erik Eriksen
- Music by: Magnus Beite
- Production company: Filmkameratene
- Distributed by: SF Norge
- Release date: October 12, 2016
- Running time: 98 minutes
- Country: Norway
- Language: Norwegian
- Budget: 2.170.000 NOK

Børning 2 is a 2016 Norwegian action-comedy directed by Hallvard Bræin, and produced by Filmkameratene. It is the sequel to Børning (2014) that have taken inspiration from the American Fast & Furious film series.

Anders Baasmo Christiansen plays the main character, Roy Gundersen, who gets out of prison for participating in the illegal street race to Nordkapp. He is challenged to a new illegal winter race from Bergen to Murmansk in the north of Russia, but refuses, as he wants to focus on spending time with his daughter. But then he hears that his daughter is participating in the race together with her boyfriend.

The movie premiered on the 12th of October 2016. The script was written by Linn-Jeanette Kyed and Anne Elvedal, following the story by Christopher Grøndahl.

A sequel, Børning 3: Asphalt Burning, was filmed in Norway, Sweden, Denmark, and Germany that ended with a race in the world known race track Nürburgring.

== Plot ==
Roy gets out of jail after 2 years, for participating in the illegal street race to Nordkapp. He is determined on getting his life back on track. He has hit rock bottom, gone bankrupt, and in a desperate attempt on restoring his life and being a good role model for his daughter, Nina, he takes a job in a gas station.

Roy's pregnant girlfriend hosts a "out of jail"-party, where some of his old racing enemies shows up and challenges him to a new race. The race starts in Fosnavåg, going through Sweden and Finland, before ending up in Murmansk in north Russia. Roy wants to keep his sheets clean, and refuses to race. That is until he finds out that Nina is attending the race together with her boyfriend Charley, and he has to stop her.

The race goes over mountains, icy roads and frozen waters. The race becomes a chase between the racers and the police, who attempt to stop them.

== Cast ==
Børning cast
Name	Character role
Anders Baasmo Christiansen	Roy Gundersen
Ida Husøy	Nina
Otto Jespersen	Nybakken
Sven Nordin	Doffen
Jenny Skavlan	Sylvia
Henrik Mestad	Philip Mørk
Marie Blokhus	Ingrid Lykke
Jonas Hoff Oftebro	Charley
Vegar Hoel	Kayser
Lisa Karlsnes	Madeleine
Robert Skjærstad	Arne Roger
Klaus Joacim Sonstad	Klaus Sonstad
Stig Frode Henriksen	Petter'n
Mikkel Gaup	Mikkel
Jade Francis Haj	Fredrik
Arthur Berning	Kenneth
Lisa Uhlen Ryssevik	Thea
Emil Lystvedt Berntsen	Tommy
Fredrik Skogsrud	Tor Erik
Anders Rydning	Paul
Thomas Ryste	Kjellen
Tori-Lena Eikanger	Gerd
Simon Norrthon	Stefan
Kristo Salminen	Finnish Police officer
Mats Mogeland	Prison guard
Idun Daae Alstad	
Ingebjørg Lyster	
Frode Haarstad	Olsson
Peter Møller Christensen	
Jukka M. Peramaa	
Roger William Handroos	
Bo André Hagen	
Kenneth Olsen	
Håvard Svang	
Arthur Sævik	
Harald Bjerke	
Per Asphaug	
Arnulf Erdal	
Veronica Johnsen	
Iver Magga	
Joakim Schistad	
Dmitry Polyakov	
Roman Khoroshilov	
Geir Schau	Boccia-Geir
Ravdeep Singh Bajwa	Fabian

== Reception ==
=== Box office ===
Like the first film, Børning 2 became an immediate success in the Norwegian box office, selling over 55 000 tickets on the day of the premiere breaking the Norwegian record, and accumulating over 212 000 viewers the first 5 days of showing. The film ended up with over 383 000 views. The movie has an approximate total budget of $2,500,000.

=== Critical reception ===
"When it comes to the driving sequences itself, Børning 2 seems to be better prepared than its predecessor, even when racing over icy seas. There is more and more intense driving in this movie, better stunts and more exciting winter-and-snow landscapes. As such, the movie is capable of avoiding being boring."
— Morten Ståle Nilsen of VG.no, in his review of Børning 2.

Børning 2 received mixed to positive reviews from the critics.

Birger Vestmo from NRK P3's Filmpolitiet praises the movie for its driving and stunts in the winter snow and ice. "The movie is well done visually, where the colourful cars are a great contrast to the snow white landscapes they are racing through". He rated the movie a 4 out of 6.

Morten Ståle Nilsen from VG.no says what the movie lacks in story and relationships, it makes up for in the driving scenes. "The sentimental side of the movie feels even more insecure than the previous movie, where it now is full of relationships it is hard to believe (including the central relationship between father and daughter)." Nilsen rated the movie a 4 out of 6.

The film reviewer from Dagbladet, Aksel Kielland, criticizes the movie for the way it portrays the female role in the movie. "It doesn't matter that the script is written by two women (Anne Elvedal and Linn-Jeanette Kyed) or that the bikini ladies from the first movie is gone - "Børning 2" is about as hostile to women as it is possible for commercial Norwegian entertainment to become in 2016.". With this he rates the movie a 2 out of 6.

=== Accolades ===
Børning 2 has been nominated to 4 Amanda Awards, including the People's choice award, and 1 Kosmorama Award.

List of award nominations
Year	Award	Category	Result
2017	Amanda Award	Best Norwegian feature film	Nominee
2017	Amanda Award	Best visual effects	Nominee
2017	Amanda Award	Best sound design	Nominee
2017	Amanda Award	People's choice	Nominee
2017	Kosmorama Award	Best director	Nominee
