= Asle og Alida =

Opera by Bent Sørensen

Asle og Alida (lit. 'Asle and Alida') is a Norwegian opera in two acts composed by Bent Sørensen with a libretto in Nynorsk by Nobel Prize winner Jon Fosse, based on his Trilogy novellas.

The opera was commissioned by Eivind Gullberg Jensen after he was appointed director of the Bergen National Opera. It was produced by Bergen National Opera, in collaboration with the Royal Danish Theatre. It premiered at Grieghallen in Bergen on March 29, 2025 with orchestration from the Bergen Philharmonic Orchestra conducted by Johannes Gustavsson and directed by Sofia Jupither. Norway's minister of culture Lubna Jaffery attended the premiere. After premiering in Bergen it will also be performed at the Royal Danish Theatre in Copenhagen in May and June.

== Plot ==
=== Act I ===
Asle and Alida arrive in Bjørgvin (the old city of Bergen) by boat from their hometown. Alida is pregnant and they are looking for a place to stay, but are turned away at every door, even though they have some money from selling the boat and from Alida's mother. They rest tired on the streets and dream back to the time when they first met, at a summer wedding where Asle was playing the violin. Their eyes met and the music carried them away, floating, and they have been the lovers Asle and Alida ever since. It is also revealed that Alida has stolen the money from her mother and the couple fled with the boat after Asle confronted the angry mother in the homestead.

Finally, an old woman opens the door, but only chastises them because they are living in sin and refuses to house them. They then encounter a young woman who offers Asle to live with her, but affronts Alida, calling her names. When they leave, an old man appears who invites them into his lodging house, but his open lust for Alida drives them away to the streets.

The couple runs into the old woman again, who locks up an empty house, but when asked for lodging, she once more curses them, mocks the bone-weary Alida and tells them she will never rent a room to them. A desperate Asle overwhelms the woman to take the keys and drags her away. She is never seen again. Asle and Alida stay in the old woman's house and Alida gives birth to a baby son, Sigvald.

=== Act II ===
It is winter and Asle and Alida have left Bjørgvin to live in a house near the fjords. Asle has sold his violin, much to Alida's disappointment, but he wants to buy wedding rings in Bjørgvin and needs the money. He travels to the city and Alida has premonitions she will never see him again.

In Bjørgvin, Asle cannot find the jeweller and while searching the streets, he runs into the old man again, who threatens him. He also meets the young woman who tries to seduce him and calls him the greatest of fools when he refuses. A young man appears, who claims to know Asle from his hometown, Dylgja. He shows Asle a beautiful bracelet he has bought from the jeweller for "the one I will meet one day". The young man offers to take Asle to the jeweller who has another bracelet like this, but they are stopped by the old man, who, having overheard the name of the hometown, reveals that a man was drowned there and his boat stolen and the man's wife murdered in her home. Also an old woman disappeared when Asle first came to Bjørgvin and he will take him to the hangman to pay for his crimes.

In the meantime Alida waits for Asle at their house by the fjord, but being lonely and running out of food, she then also travels to Bjørgvin. Tired and hungry she meets the young man outside the city, who recognises her and introduces himself as Asleik from Vik. He offers her food and warmth on his boat and to take her to Vik, but Alida wants to travel on to find Asle. Asleik tells her that he witnessed Asle's hanging in Björgvin and gives the bracelet to her. When Alida asks if it is a gift from Asle, the young man replies that she can believe it is. When Alida is still undecided, he tells her that he also has a violin that he bought from an old man on his boat and that little Sigvald will learn to play it when he grows up.

Alida calls out for Asle and hears his voice answering that she should follow Asleik, but he, Asle, will always be with her, in the wind, the music and little Sigvald. They will always be Asle and Alida.

== Premiere cast ==
- Asle: Wiktor Sundqvist, Tenor
- Alida: Louise McClelland Jacobsen, Soprano
- The old woman: Randi Stene, Mezzosoprano
- The old man: Johannes Weisser, Baritone
- The young woman: Christina Jønsi, Mezzosoprano
- The young man, Asleik: Frank Kjosås
- The violin player: Alma Serafin Kraggerud

== Critical response ==
Music critic Maja Sievers Skanding wrote after the premiere that while music is supposed to be the main attraction of any opera, it was the libretto by Jon Fosse that made Asle og Alida an anticipated event. She called the music "too uneven to lift Fosse's work to new heights" and though it was beautiful, opined that the restlessness of the presentation did not align well with Fosse's particular style of language. She also found fault in the non-Norwegian singers' problems with the pronunciation of the Nynorsk text.

The Swedish Aftonbladet offered a mixed review that echoed the problems with the Nynorsk text and noticed a lack of dramatic power in the opera, where the storyline could not match Fosse's hypnotic writing. While acknowledging the beautiful singing of lead roles Wiktor Sundqvist and Louise McClelland Jacobsen, the reviewer felt that the long lyrical lines felt too monotonous to allow them to fully develop their characters. The music and orchestration by the Bergen Philharmonic Orchestra was praised as "truly magical, icy sounds".
