= Elling =

2001 film by Petter Næss

- Norwegian theatrical poster
- Directed by: Petter Næss
- Screenplay by: Axel Hellstenius
- Based on: Brødre i blodet by Ingvar Ambjørnsen
- Produced by: Dag Alveberg
- Starring: Per Christian Ellefsen; Sven Nordin; Marit Pia Jacobsen; Jørgen Langhelle; Per Christensen; Hilde Olausson; Ola Otnes; Eli Anne Linnestad; Cecilie A. Mosli; Joachim Rafaelsen; Per Gørvell; Knud Dahl; Knut Haugmark
- Cinematography: Svein Krøvel
- Edited by: Inge-Lise Langfeldt
- Music by: Lars Lillo-Stenberg
- Production company: Maipo Film- og TV Produksjon
- Distributed by: Universal Pictures (though United International Pictures)
- Release dates: 16 March 2001 (Norway); 19 April 2002 (U.S.)
- Running time: 89 minutes
- Country: Norway
- Language: Norwegian
- Box office: 750,000 admissions (Norway)

Elling is a Norwegian black comedy film directed by Petter Næss. Shot mostly in and around the Norwegian capital Oslo, the film, which was released in 2001, is primarily based on Ingvar Ambjørnsen's novel Brødre i blodet ("Blood brothers", 1996), one of a series of four featuring the Elling character – the others are Utsikt til paradiset ("A view of paradise", 1993), Fugledansen ("The bird dance", 1995), and Elsk meg i morgen ("Love me tomorrow", 1999). The film was followed by an original prequel not based on any of the novels, Mors Elling (2003), and a sequel, Elsk meg i morgen (2005) based on the fourth and last book in the series.

== Plot ==
The movie deals with the main character, Elling, a man in his 40s with generalized anxiety, and his struggle to function normally in society. He has anxiety, dizziness, and neurotic tendencies, which prevent him from living on his own. Elling has lived with his mother his entire life, and when she dies, the authorities take him from the house where he has always lived and send him to an institution. His roommate is the simple-minded, sex-obsessed Kjell Bjarne. The Norwegian government pays for the two to move into an apartment in Oslo, where every day is a challenge as they must prove they can get out into the real world and lead relatively normal lives. With the help of social worker Frank and a few new friends, they learn to break free from their respective conditions. Elling eventually discovers a new vocation as a rebel poet, while Kjell befriends a pregnant woman with a drinking problem, which eventually turns into a romance. The film ends with both men as firm friends, embarking on new lives filled with hope.

== Cast ==
- Elling — (Per Christian Ellefsen)
- Kjell Bjarne — (Sven Nordin)
- Reidun Nordsletten — (Marit Pia Jacobsen)
- Frank Åsli — (Jørgen Langhelle)
- Alfons Jørgensen — (Per Christensen)
- Gunn — (Hilde Olausson)
- Hauger — (Ola Otnes)
- Johanne — (Eli Anne Linnestad)
- Cecilie Kornes — (Cecilie A. Mosli)
- Haakon Willum — (Joachim Rafaelsen)
- Eriksen — (Per Gørvell)
- Servitør på bar — (Knud Dahl)
- Stasjonsbetjent — (Knut Haugmark)

== Reception ==
=== Critical response ===
Elling has an approval rating of 85% on review aggregator website Rotten Tomatoes, based on 59 reviews, and an average rating of 7.10/10. The website's critical consensus states: "Quirky without being overly cutesy, Elling is a gentle, warm comedy". Metacritic assigned the film a weighted average score of 70 out of 100, based on 21 critics, indicating "generally favorable reviews".

=== Box office ===
It was the most popular Norwegian film of the year with admissions of 750,000.

=== Awards ===
- Academy Awards: Best Foreign Language Film — Nominated (2002)
- Amanda Awards (Norway): Best Actor (Per Christian Ellefsen) — Nominated (2001)

In addition, the film was nominated and won several other awards all over the world.

== Prequel ==
A prequel, Mother's Elling, was released in 2003.
