= De blå ulvene =

1993 Norwegian crime film

De bl ulvene
- Directed by: Morten Kolstad
- Written by: Ingvar Ambjørnsen (book); Axel Hellstenius (screenplay)
- Produced by: John M. Jacobsen
- Starring: Håvard Bakke; Tommy Karlsen; Viggo Jønsberg; Brit Elisabeth Haagensli; Roy Hansen; Petronella Barker
- Release date: 1993
- Running time: 155 minutes
- Country: Norway
- Language: Norwegian
- Box office: NOK8.5 million

De blå ulvene (English: "The Blue Wolves") is a 1993 Norwegian crime film directed by Morten Kolstad, starring Håvard Bakke, Tommy Karlsen and Viggo Jønsberg.

== Synopsis ==
Pelle's (Bakke) father (Jønsberg) is behaving strangely, jad a brunsost and together with Proffen (Karlsen), Pelle decides to investigate.
