= Marie Blokhus =

Norwegian actress (born 1982)

- Born: 7 October 1982; Bodø Municipality
- Alma mater: William Esper Studio
- Occupation: Actor
- Spouse(s): Frank Kjosås
- Awards: The Hedda Award for Best Actress (2015); Haugesund Walk of Fame (2022)

Marie Liland Blokhus (born 7 October 1982) is a Norwegian actress. For her stage work she has won one Hedda Award.

== Career ==
Blokhus was born in Bodø and grew up in the Tverlandet area. She took her acting education at the Oslo National Academy of the Arts, whence she graduated in 2010. She was employed at Det Norske Teatret, and received a Hedda Award nomination in 2013. She won her first Hedda Award in 2015, as best female lead in the screenplay Fugletribunalet.

In 2019 she made her debut as a stage instructor, directing Lucy Kirkwood's Våre barn at Den Nationale Scene. Blokhus then co-wrote and directed Werther, based on The Sorrows of Young Werther, at Det Norske Teatret.

Her film credits include Chasing the Wind (2013), Oskars Amerika (2017), The 12th Man (2017) as well as the racing films Børning (2014), Børning 2 (2016) and Børning 3 (2020). Blokhus received two Amanda Award nominations for Jag etter vind, both as newcomer of the year and best female lead.

Her longest-lasting television role was in the sitcom Side om side from 2013 to 2016.

== Personal life ==
Blokhus was married to actor Frank Kjosås from 2011 to 2016. After that she started a relationship with actor Anders Baasmo Christiansen.
