= Over stork og stein =

- Directed by: Eva Isaksen
- Screenplay by: Axel Hellstenius
- Produced by: Dag Nordahl; Peter Bøe
- Starring: Johannes Joner; Anneke von der Lippe; Dennis Storhøi
- Cinematography: Kjell Vassdal
- Edited by: Pål Gengenbach
- Music by: Øivind R. Nilsen; Steinar Starholm
- Release date: September 2, 1994
- Running time: 99 minutes
- Country: Norway
- Language: Norwegian

Over stork og stein is a Norwegian comedy from 1994 directed by Eva Isaksen. The film had its premiere on 2 September 1994 at Saga kino.

== Cast ==
- Anneke von der Lippe – Liv
- Johannes Joner – Erling
- Dennis Storhøi – Torfinn
- Kari-Ann Grønsund – Jorunn
- Lars Sørbø – Marius
- Terje Strømdahl – Lyder
- Ivar Nørve – Fysioterapeut
- Ivar Sandvik – Edvard
- Anitra Eriksen – Eva
- Grethe Kausland – Astrid
