= John M. Jacobsen =

Norwegian film producer (born 1944)

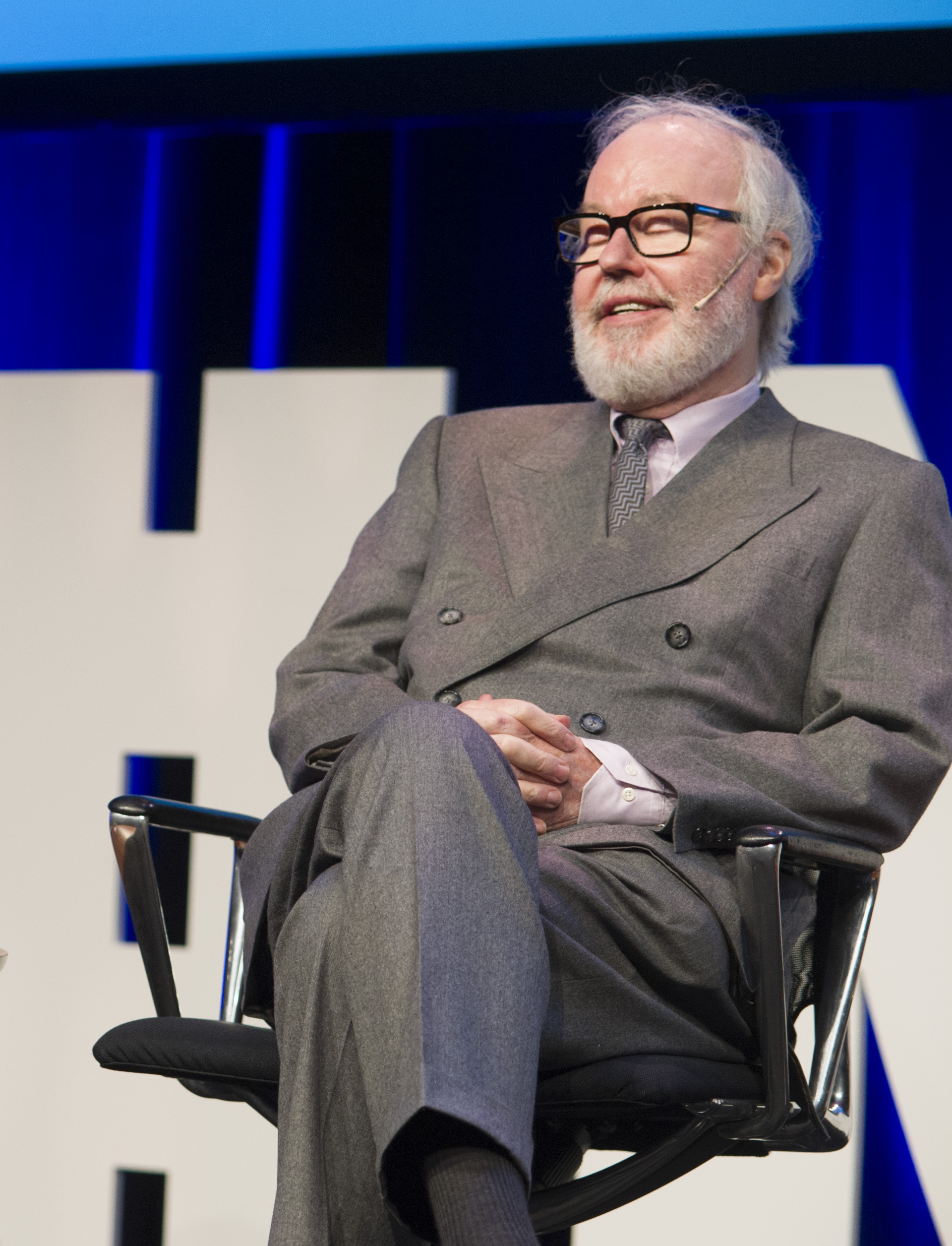
- Born: John Martin Jacobsen; 27 December 1944 (age 81); Oslo, Norway
- Occupation: Film producer
- Years active: In business since 1959, Producer since 1983 - present
- Spouse: Vibeke Idsøe

John Martin Jacobsen (born 27 December 1944) is a Norwegian film producer. He is the leader of the Norwegian production company Filmkameratene, and has produced more than 30 Norwegian movies.

Jacobsen has received several awards for his work. In 2003 he was awarded the Amanda Committee's Honorary Award. In 2008 he was appointed commander of the Order of St. Olav, for the work he has done for Norwegian film.

Jacobsen grew up in Osterhaus gate, Oslo. His mother was a stay-at-home mom, and his dad was a ship officer. He lived right next to a cinema, where he spent a lot of time.

He started earning money by delivering newspapers, but as a 15 year old he got hired by the local cinema. The man in charge of the cinema realized that Jacobsen had an extreme interest for film, and wanted him to be in charge of setting up their film program, earning 2% of the turnover.

== Filmography ==
- Børning 3 (2020)
- Operasjon Mumie (2019)
- Amundsen (2019)
- Operasjon Mørkemann (2018)
- Kings Bay (2017)
- Børning 2 (2016)
- The Lion Woman (2016)
- The saboteurs (2015)
- Operation Arctic (2014)
- Børning (2014)
- Alle barn er laget av ild (2013)
- Victoria (2013)
- Blekkulf (2012)
- Simon & the Oaks (2011)
- Elias and the Treasure of the Sea (2010)
- The Troll Hunter (2010)
- Max Manus (2008)
- Elias og kongeskipet (2007)
- Izzat (2005)
- 37 og et halvt (2005)
- Kvinnen i mitt liv (2003)
- Karlsson på taket (2002)
- Sleepwalker (2000)
- Sofies verden (1999)
- Only Clouds Move the Stars (1998)
- Gurin with the Foxtail (Solan, Ludvig og Gurin med reverompa) (1998)
- Head Above Water (1996)
- Jakten på nyresteinen (1996)
- De blå ulvene (1993)
- Hodet over vannet (1993)
- Giftige løgner (1992)
- Haakon Haakonsen (1990)
- Pathfinder (1987)
- Hard asfalt (1986)
- Prima Veras saga om Olav den hellige (1983)

== Awards ==
List of award nominations
Year	Award	Category	Movie	Result
2015	Amanda Award	Best Norwegian feature film	Børning	Winner
2015	Amanda Award	People's Choice award	Børning	Winner
2015	Kanonprisen Award	Best producer	Børning	Winner
2009	Amanda Award	Best Norwegian feature film	Max Manus	Winner
2008	Kanonprisen Award	Best Producer		Winner
2007	Gullruten Award	Professional Award	Den lille redningsskøyta Elias	Winner
2003	Amanda Award	Honorary Award		Winner
1998	Gullstrimmelen			Winner
1988	Aamot-statuetten			Winner

=== Honours ===
- 2025: honoured at the 53rd Norwegian International Film Festival.
