= Jonny Halberg =

Norwegian author and dramatist

- Born: October 12, 1962 (age 63); Jørstadmoen, Lillehammer, Norway
- Education: Forfatterstudiet i Bø
- Occupations: Author, dramatist
- Writing career
- Language: Norwegian
- Notable work: Flommen (2000)
- Notable awards: Sult-prisen (1998); P2-lytternes romanpris (2000); Kritikerprisen (2000); Språklig samlings litteraturpris (2001)

Jonny Halberg (born 12 October 1962 in Jørstadmoen, Lillehammer) is a Norwegian author and dramatist, now living in Moss, Jeløya. He studied at Forfatterstudiet i Bø. Halberg was the editor of the magazine Vagant in 1998. He has been translated to many languages.

== Bibliography ==
=== Novels ===
- Trass (1996)
- Flommen (2000)
- En uskyldig tid (2002)
- Gå til fjellet (2004)
- Tvillingen (2006)
- All verdens ulykker (2007)

=== Short stories ===
- Overgang til tertiær (1989)
- Gå under (1992)

=== Dramas ===
- Budbringeren – film script (1998) (with Pål Sletaune)
- Amatørene – film script (2001) (with Pål Sletaune)

== Prizes ==
- Sult-prisen 1998
- P2-lytternes romanpris 2000, for Flommen
- Kritikerprisen 2000, for Flommen
- Språklig samlings litteraturpris 2001
