= Mari Eriksmoen =

Norwegian opera singer

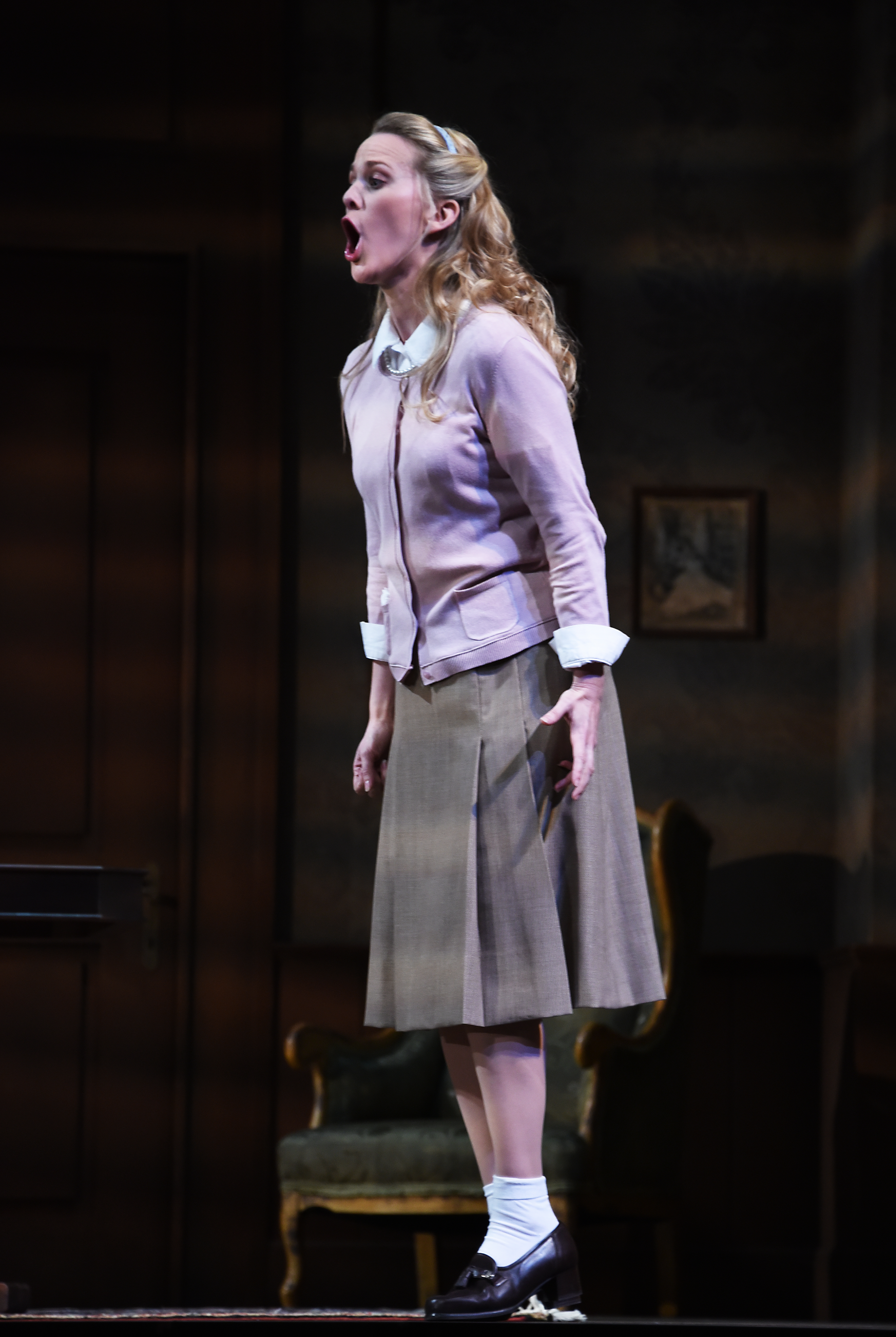
- in Il barbiere di Siviglia, Theater an der Wien (2015)
- Born: January 10, 1983 (age 42); Ski, Norway
- Occupation: Operatic soprano
- Spouse: Eivind Gullberg Jensen

Mari Eriksmoen is a Norwegian soprano and opera singer with a repertoire including roles for coloratura soprano and lyric soprano

== Education and career ==
Eriksmoen was educated at the Norwegian Academy of Music in Oslo, the Conservatoire National Supérieur de Musique et de Danse in Paris and the Royal Danish Opera Academy in Copenhagen. Eriksmoen debuted in 2006 and has performed through Europe.

She was described as "bright-voiced" and as showing "strength at both extremes of her range in a memorable 'Come scoglio'" in her performance as Fiordiligi in Mozart's Così fan tutte, although reviews of earlier performances have been more mixed. Other performances have received strong reviews.

== Awards ==
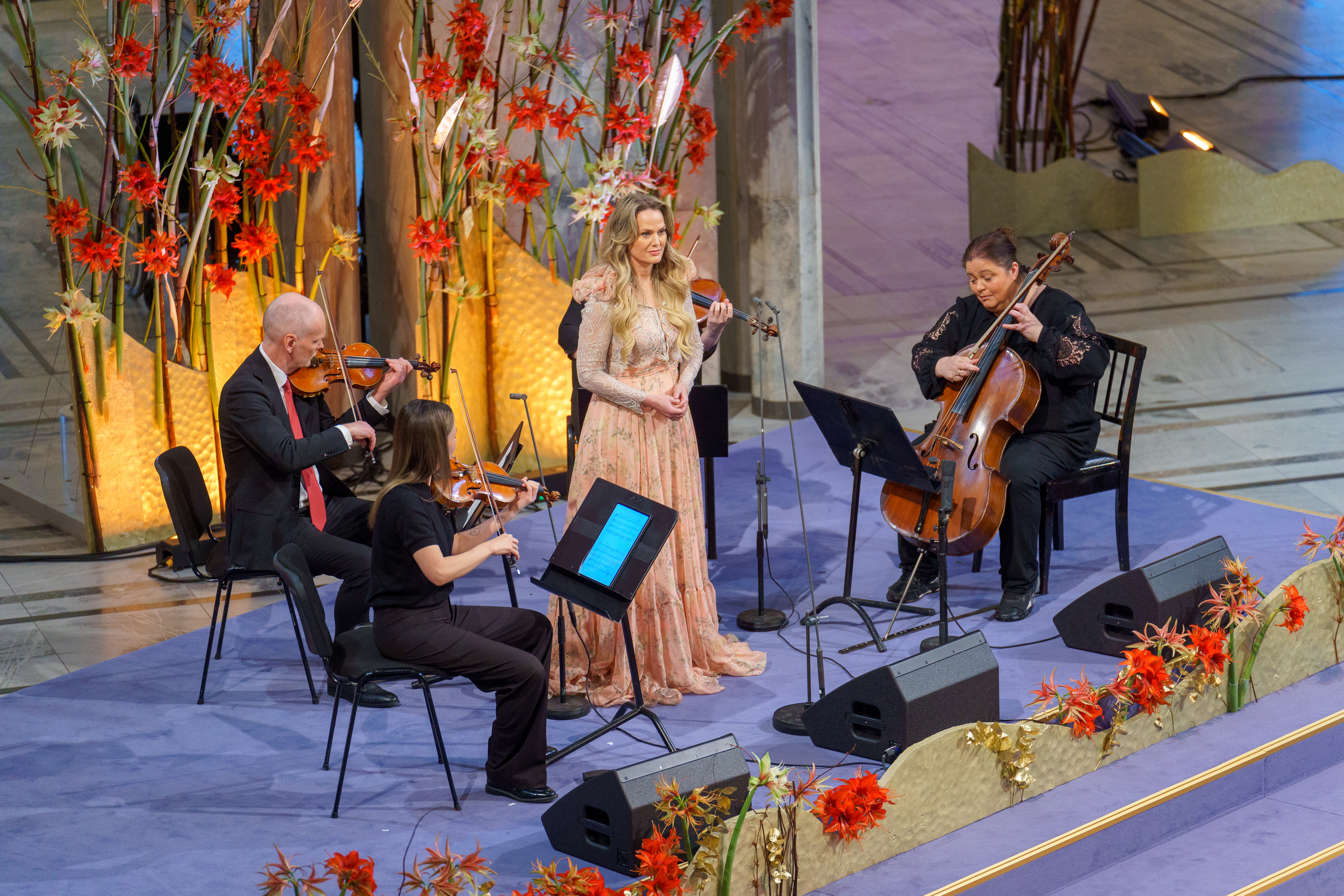
Eriksmoen performing at the 2024 Nobel Peace Prize Ceremony in Oslo, Norway

In 2009 she received the Lindeman Prize for Young Musicians. In 2011 she received Statoil's talent stipend.

== Personal life ==
Eriksmoen lives in Bergen with her husband, conductor Eivind Gullberg Jensen and their two children.
