= Ida Holten Worsøe =

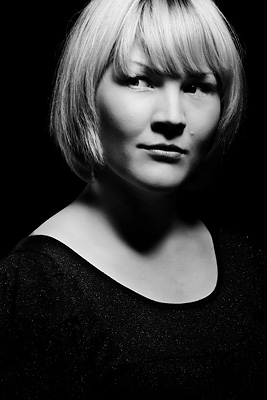
2008

Ida Holten Worsøe (born 14 July 1981) is a Norwegian actor and dancer.

She was born in Bærum and grew up at Haslum. Doing dance, theatre and choir as a child, she studied music at Rud Upper Secondary School, theatre at Romerike Folk High School, dance at the Danish Dance Theatre and musicals at Gothenburg Theatre Academy (from 2002 to 2005).

Following roles in Appelsinene på Fagerborg and Jul i Blåfjell at Oslo Nye Teater in 2004, she was employed at Hålogaland Teater from 2005. While working here, Worsøe was twice nominated for the Hedda Award, first in 2006 for Marcela in The Dog in the Manger and in 2007 for Sally Bowles in Cabaret.

Worsøe left Hålogaland Teater in 2009 and became a freelancer. Among others, she reprised her role as Sally Bowles at Den Nationale Scene in 2020.

She married fellow musical artist Håvard Bakke in Tanum Church in August 2016.
