= Sleepwalker (2000 film) =

- Directed by: Johannes Runeborg
- Written by: Johan Brännström
- Produced by: John M. Jacobsen
- Starring: Ralph Carlsson; Ewa Carlsson; Anders Palm; Tuva Novotny
- Cinematography: Håkan Holmberg
- Music by: Christian Kribbe Sandqvist
- Distributed by: AB Svensk Filmindustri
- Release date: 4 August 2000
- Running time: 95 min
- Country: Sweden
- Language: Swedish

Sleepwalker is a Swedish horror-thriller film released in 2000. It was filmed in Stockholm and was released in cinemas on August 4, 2000.

== Plot ==
Successful building contractor Ulrik Hansson (Ralph Carlsson) returns to his stressful life after coming back from a fishing vacation with his family. Everything seems back to normal until Ulrik wakes up the next morning to find his wife and two children missing and his sheets covered in blood. He contacts the police and informs them he was passed out due to the combination of wine and prescribed sleeping pills. Fearing he may have been sleepwalking, Ulrik straps a video camera to himself to record his nocturnal activities and figure out what happened to his family. Meanwhile, Inspector Levin (Anders Palm) begins to suspect Ulrik may not be telling the entire truth.

== Cast ==
- Ralph Carlsson as Ulrik Hansson
- Ewa Carlsson as Monika Hansson
- Anders Palm as Inspector Levin
- Tuva Novotny as Saga Hansson
- Donald Högberg as Dr. Christian
- Fredrik Hammar as Levin's Colleague
- Mats Rudal as Fredrik
- Sylvia Rauan as Helen

== Awards ==
The film earned director Johannes Runeborg the New Blood award at the 2001 Festival du Film Policier de Cognac. It was also nominated for Best Film at the 2001 Sitges Film Festival.

== US remake ==
In September 2001, it was announced that Intermedia had purchased the U.S. remakes rights for the film and talked with director Joel Schumacher. The script was written by Nick Kazan and Doug Wright. Richard Gere was also negotiating to play the lead in the remake. However, the remake eventually failed to materialize.
