= Det perfekte mord =

- Directed by: Eva Isaksen
- Written by: Eva Isaksen; Morten Barth; Jan Kjærstad (novel)
- Starring: Gard B. Eidsvold; Anna-Lena Hemström; Anne Marit Jacobsen
- Release date: 1992
- Running time: 95 minutes
- Country: Norway
- Language: Norwegian

Det perfekte mord (English: The Perfect Murder), also known as Det perfekte mord – Homo Falsus, is a 1992 Norwegian thriller film directed by Eva Isaksen, starring Gard B. Eidsvold, Anna-Lena Hemström and Anne Marit Jacobsen. It is based on the novel Homo Falsus by Jan Kjærstad.

Film-maker Pierre (Eidsvold) is shooting an erotic thriller with his girlfriend Greta (Hemström). Soon the story begins to repeat itself in real life.
