= Svein Krøvel =

Norwegian cinematographer

- Born: 12 May 1946; Norway
- Died: 29 December 2011 (aged 65)
- Occupation(s): Cinematographer, photographer

Svein Krøvel (12 May 1946 – 29 December 2011) was a Norwegian cinematographer, known for his collaborations with director Knut Erik Jensen and Petter Næss. Krøvel worked on both documentaries and feature films. He started his feature film career in 1980. Since then he has been responsible for the photography of around 20 features, and collaborated with several of Norway's leading directors.

Among the films Krøvel photographed and that have reached an international audience are Burnt by Frost (1997), Passing Darkness (2000) and Cool and Crazy (2001), all of which were directed by Knut Erik Jensen. The latter film became a huge success in Norway. Krøvel also photographed Torun Lian's Only Clouds Move the Stars (1998), which was awarded the Ingmar Bergman prize in 1999. He was also responsible for the photography in Norway's 2002 Oscar entry, Elling, directed by Petter Næss.

== Selected filmography ==
- Elling (2001)
- Mozart and the Whale (2005)
