= Gabriele Haefs =

German writer and translator (born 1953)

- Born: 27 August 1953 (age 72); Wachtendonk, Germany
- Occupation: Translator
- Spouse: Ingvar Ambjørnsen (m. 1985; died 2025)
- Relatives: Gisbert Haefs (brother)
- Awards: Order of St. Olav

Gabriele Haefs (born 27 August 1953) is a German writer and translator.

== Personal life and education ==
Haefs was born in Wachtendonk to Johann Heinrich Haefs and Annie Pasch, and married the Norwegian novelist Ingvar Ambjørnsen in 1985. She graduated with a doctorate in folkloristics from the University of Hamburg in 1982.

== Career ==
Haefs is credited for having discovered Jostein Gaarder's novel Sophie's World, which she translated into German language, and eventually became a worldwide bestseller. She was decorated Knight of the Royal Norwegian Order of Merit in 2011. She was awarded the Willy Brandt Prize in 2000.
