= Fatso (2008 film) =

2008 Norwegian film directed by Arild Fröhlich

- Directed by: Arild Fröhlich
- Written by: Arild Fröhlich, Lars Gudmestad
- Based on: Fatso by Lars Ramslie
- Produced by: Jim Frazee, Mads Peter Ole Olsen
- Starring: Nils Jørgen Kaalstad; Josefin Ljungman; Kyrre Hellum; Jenny Skavlan
- Cinematography: Askild Edvardsen
- Edited by: Vidar Flataukan
- Music by: Kåre Vestrheim
- Release date: 2008
- Running time: 91 minutes
- Country: Norway
- Languages: Norwegian, Swedish, Danish

Fatso is a 2008 Norwegian film directed and co-written by Arild Fröhlich.

== Plot ==
Rino is an overweight single man who lives in his late grandmother's house. He keeps himself busy by translating instruction manuals from German into his native Norwegian. He occasionally phones his German clients and sometimes receives unannounced odd visits by his father, but apart from that his social contacts are reduced to a friendship with a show-off named Fillip who patronises him. Rino is very attracted to a till girl but each time he sees her in the supermarket he is dumbstruck and breaks into sweat. He expresses his fears by secretly drawing kafkaesque comix which are accessible for the film audience. One day after a night of watching porn and consuming plenty of convenience food he learns that his father has rented out a room to female foreigner. When the woman arrives, she explains to him she was from Sweden and intended to start over again in Norway. He doesn't ask why but he gets that information anyway when he eventually finds her helplessly drunk on the stairs to their flat. She tells him she had fallen in love with a family man who had returned to the mother of his children and she had hereby just repeated her big mistake. Next morning she sees him masturbating and later she even finds his comix. But when she leaves he has learnt enough from her to talk to his true love, the till girl, and ask her out successfully.

== Reception ==
Fatso received mixed reviews. The film was described as "well done". It has been stated that Fatso was "still enjoyable in all its oddness" and that there were even "laughs to be had within all that hesitation", but while "played for laughs" there was also a "brutal honesty" that would never be shown in a Hollywood film. One critic called Fatso's friendship with Fillip "both hilarious and sad" and added there were "direct and truthful" metaphors". Arild Fröhlich found appreciation as a "cool realist" who provided a "nontraditional" ending. Fatso was said to be "the most unromantic comedy of all times". On the other hand, the film was blamed for certain scenes which were "unnecessary and over the line". Other critics found Fatso "too mean spirited to be truly funny" or even "disgusting".

== Awards ==
The film won the Best Director award at the 2009 Amanda Awards.
