= The Half Brother =

Novel by Lars Saabye Christensen

- First edition cover
- Author: Lars Saabye Christensen
- Original title: Halvbroren
- Translator: Kenneth Steven
- Language: Norwegian
- Publisher: Cappelen
- Publication date: 4 September 2001
- Publication place: Norway
- English publication date: 2003
- Pages: 650
- ISBN: 82-02-20208-6

The Half Brother (Norwegian: Halvbroren) is a 2001 novel by the Norwegian writer Lars Saabye Christensen. The story follows a man who grows up in Oslo after World War II, with his mother, grandmother, great grandmother and half brother. The novel was published in Norwegian by Cappelen in 2001, and in English for the first time in 2003. It received the Brage Prize and the Nordic Council Literature Prize. A television series based on the novel was broadcast on NRK in 2013.

== Plot ==
Vera Jebsen is raped in Fagerborg in Oslo, on liberation day 8 May 1945. She does not say a word during the entire pregnancy, not until she gives birth in a taxi. She names the child Fred.

Arnold Nilsen from Røst in Lofoten, a circus artist and salesman, known as "The Wheel" after rolling spectacularly down a slope as a child, is allowed to move in with Jebsen's family, thanks to his self-confidence and his yellow Buick. Other than Vera and Fred, the family consists of Vera's mother, Boletta, and grandmother, known as The Old One; all in all four generations. Soon Vera has another child, whom they name Barnum Nilsen, after the master scam artist P. T. Barnum.

Barnum is sharp but very short and therefore lacks confidence. He is impressed by Fred's rebellious attitude. He attends a dance class where he meets Peder and Vivian. After being sent out from the first lesson, the three meet and hang out every time their parents think they are dancing. The three become close friends and stay by themselves for the most time. Vivian becomes a kind of girlfriend for both of the boys.

Fred and Barnum share the same bedroom. They often have confidential talks at night. Fred tries to influence Barnum to become tougher and go his own way. He hates Arnold, the stepfather, and tells Barnum that he rather would have been Barnum's father. Once, The Old One received a letter from Wilhelm, her fiancé, who disappeared while hunting in the Arctic Ocean and Greenland. The letter means a lot for everybody in the family. Barnum often reads it to Fred, who is dyslexic. Fred begins to show more respect for Barnum and his ability to write down his dreams, and gives him a typewriter as a birthday gift. Fred's recognition means a lot to Barnum. Fred attempts at a career as a boxer. Barnum adopts a motto from his father: "The important is not what you see, but what you think you see".

Barnum wins a writing competition in school which stimulates his desire to write. After coming in contact with the production of the film Hunger, based on Knut Hamsun's novel with the same title, Barnum decides to become a scriptwriter for film. Peder becomes his agent after returning from the United States. As a consequence of his grandmother's drinking habits, he develops an uncritical attitude to alcohol, which eventually leads to alcoholism.

== Publication ==
The novel was published in Norway on 4 September 2001 through Cappelen. In August 2002 it had sold 226,000 copies in Norway. It was translated to English by Kenneth Steven. Arcadia Books published it in the United Kingdom in 2003, and Arcade Publishing in the United States in 2004.

== Reception ==
=== Critical response ===
Øystein Rottem of Dagbladet made comparisons between the novel and the works of Knut Hamsun, Göran Tunström and John Irving, but also called it "a true Saabye novel. Here he offers himself at full, puts his whole previous authorship at stake, in a single gigantic bet where he has raised the pot with everything from shelved five-øre coins to newly printed 1000-kroner bills, everyday memory glimpses and brightly polished metaphors." He wrote that while there might be some longueurs which could have been trimmed, it is nothing that prevents the work from "pulling up, high up", and "give the readers a wealth of sparkling moments".

Paul Binding of The Guardian described The Half Brother as a "phenomenally successful novel". Regarding the structure, he wrote that the author uses time and peripheral characters to "creatively disturb any conventional narrative forward motion", and that "Mystery is of the book's very essence, for all the clarity, the realism of the presentation." Binding wrote: "The Half Brother - translated into compulsively readable prose by writer Kenneth Steven - is no mere interesting example of contemporary Scandinavian writing; it's a deeply felt, intricately worked and intellectually searching work of absolutely international importance." Gerard Woodward wrote in The Daily Telegraph: "The Half Brother is the kind of big, ambitious, panoramic novel of the sort we tend to think only Americans write these days. It is part Bildungsroman — depicting the coming of age of a writer — part a Ulysses for Oslo, whose snowy parks and shadowy churches are vividly rendered." Woodward also wrote: "The pace slackens at times, particularly towards the end but, for the most part, the language has enough energy and inventiveness to carry us along. A big, rewarding read."

=== Accolades ===
The novel received the Brage Prize for Fiction for Adults. It won the Norwegian Booksellers' Prize for best book of the year; Saabye Christensen thereby became the first author to receive this prize twice, as he also had won in 1990 for the novel Bly. The Half Brother received the Nordic Council Literature Prize in 2002. The Adjudicating Committee described the winner as a "richly nuanced novel", with a story that has "a keynote of distance, loss and grief but has a redeeming feature of humour, friendship and black hope."

== Adaptation ==
Formal talks about an adaptation for Norwegian television started in 2002, and the project was approved in 2010. Produced for NRK by the production company Monster, the series consists of eight 50-minute episodes directed by Per-Olav Sørensen, and starring Frank Kjosås, Nicolai Cleve Broch, and Agnes Kittelsen. It premiered in January 2013. The series has been sold to 13 countries, including MHz Networks in the US.
