= Noord Nederlands Orkest =

Dutch symphony orchestra

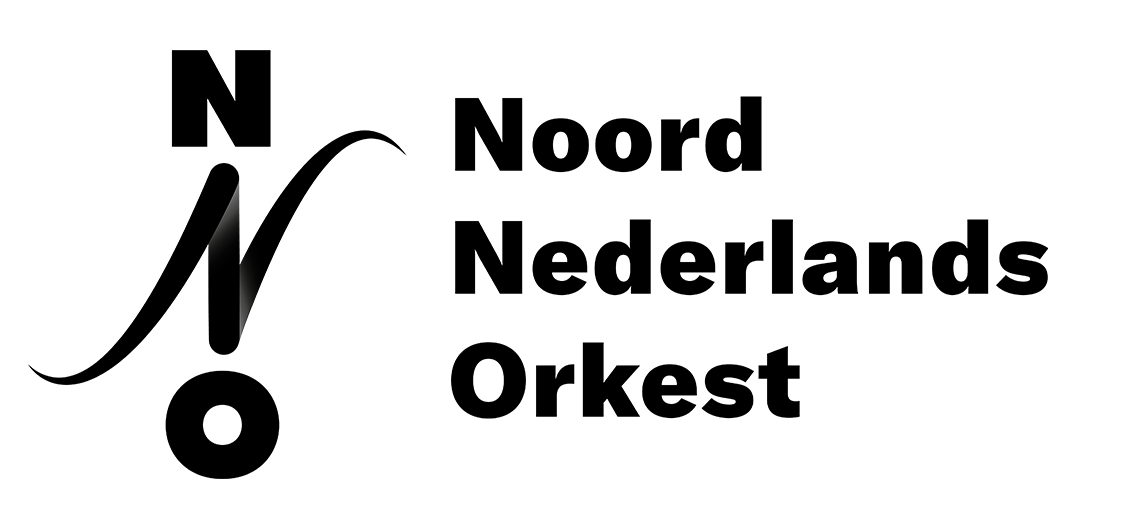

The Noord Nederlands Orkest (NNO; English, North Netherlands Symphony Orchestra) is a Dutch symphony orchestra based in Groningen. The NNO performs at De Oosterpoort in Groningen and also on a regular basis at these venues in the provinces of Groningen, Friesland and Drenthe:

- Drachten, De Lawei
- Emmen, Atlas Theater
- Hoogeveen, De Tamboer
- Leeuwarden, De Harmonie
- Meppel, Schouwburg Ogterop
- Stadskanaal, Theater Geert Teis

== History ==
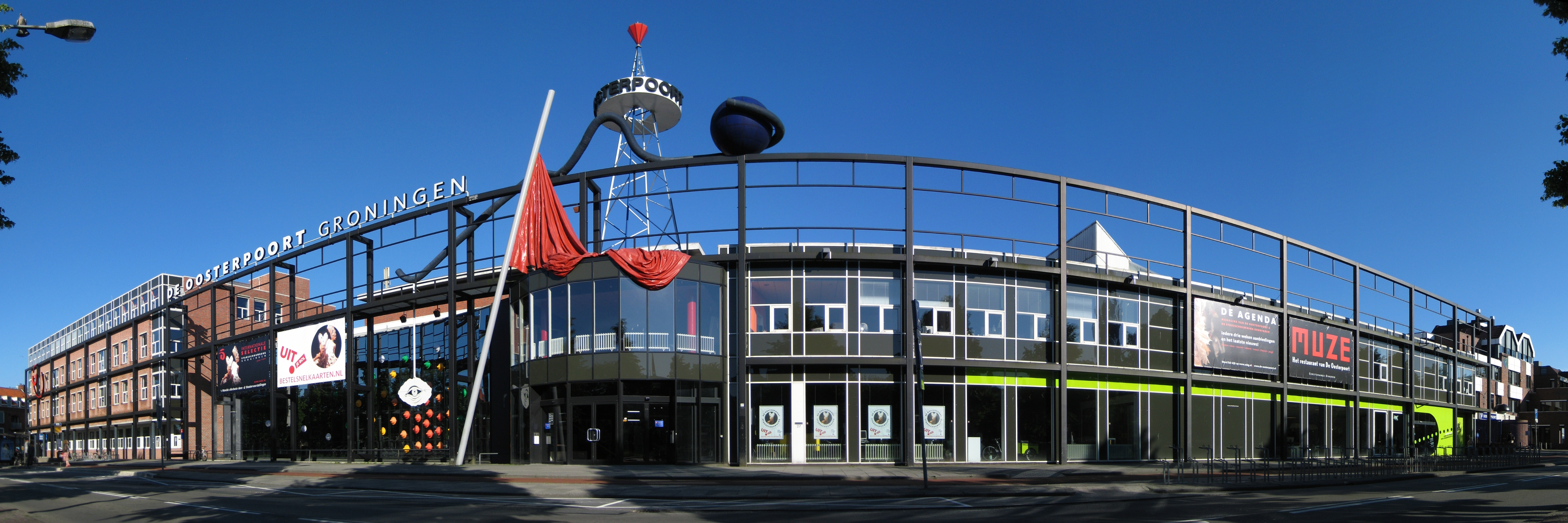

The historical roots of the NNO date back to 1862, when the Orkest der Vereeniging De Harmonie (Orchestra of the Society De Harmonie) was established in Groningen. This orchestra attained independent status in 1926 under the name Groninger Orkest Vereeniging, which was further renamed the Noordelijk Filharmonisch Orkest (NFO) in 1962. In 1989, the NFO was merged with a second orchestra, the Frysk Orkest (originally from Leeuwarden), to establish the NNO in its present form.

The orchestra's most recent managing director was Ingeborg Walinga, who was named to the post in March 2011 and formally assumed the title on 1 June 2011. Walinga concluded her tenure in the post in 2021. In October 2021, the NNO announced the appointment of Liesbeth Kok as its next managing director, effective 1 January 2022.

The NNO has made commercial recordings for such labels as Donemus and MuziekGroep Nederland, including music of Dutch composers such as Jacob van Domselaer and Jacob ter Veldhuis.

== Chief conductors ==
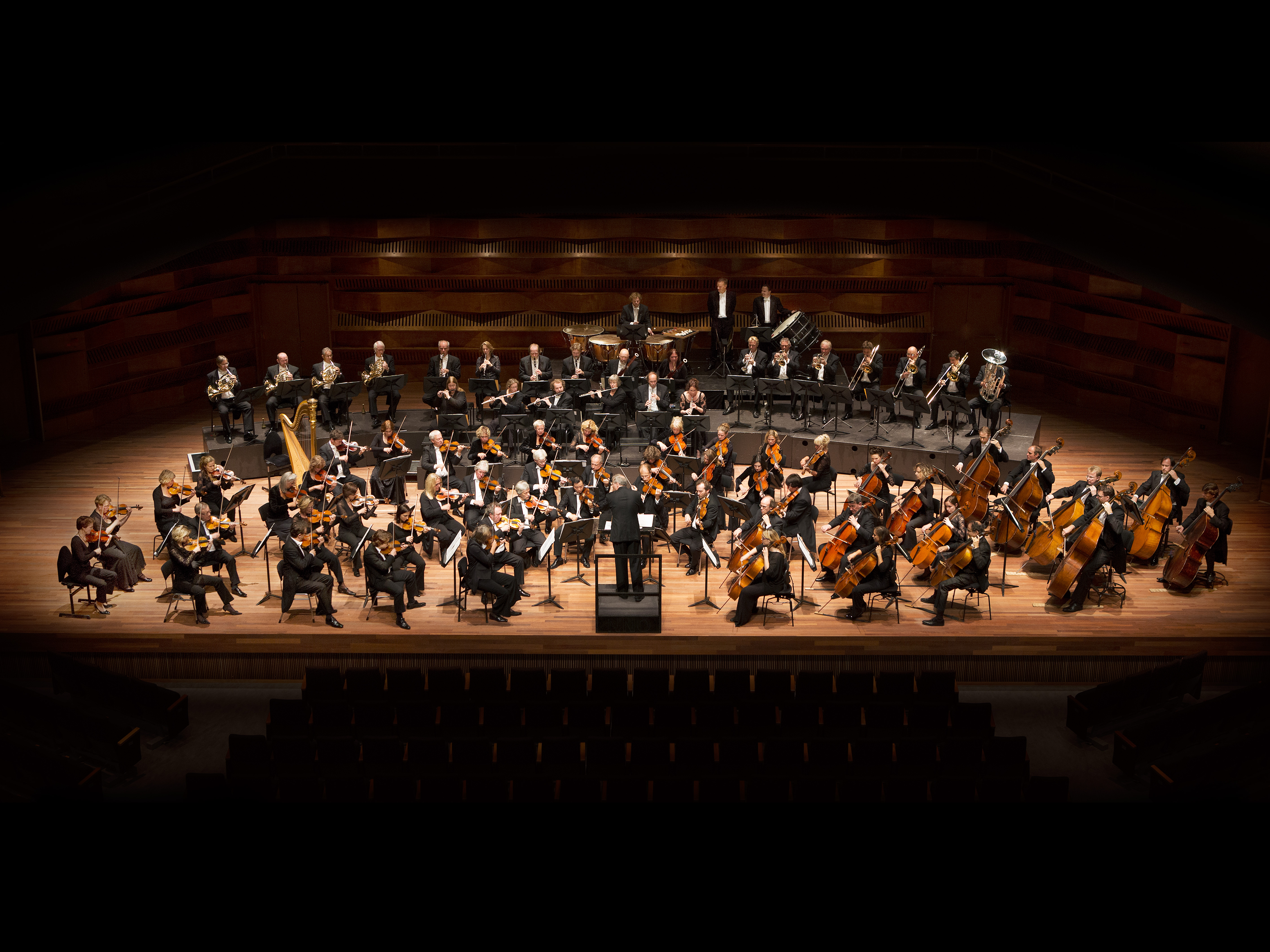
Noord Nederlands Orkest in De Oosterpoort

The first chief conductor of the NNO was Jacek Kaspszyk, from 1991 to 1995. Subsequent chief conductors included Hans Drewanz (1995–1997) and Viktor Liberman (1997–1999). Alexander Vedernikov held the title of principal guest conductor (vaste gastdirigent) from 2001 to 2003. Michel Tabachnik was chief conductor from 2005 to 2011, and now has the title of conductor laureate. In March 2011, the NNO announced the appointment of Stefan Asbury as its chief conductor, as of the 2011–2012 season, with an initial contract of 3 years. Asbury stood down from the post in 2015.

In 2018, Eivind Gullberg Jensen first guest-conducted the NNO. Jensen returned for two additional guest-conducting engagements, the most recent in September 2021. In October 2021, the NNO announced the appointment of Jensen as its next chief conductor, effective with the 2022–2023 season. In August 2024, the NNO announced an extension of Jensen's contract as its chief conductor through the 2026-2027 season.

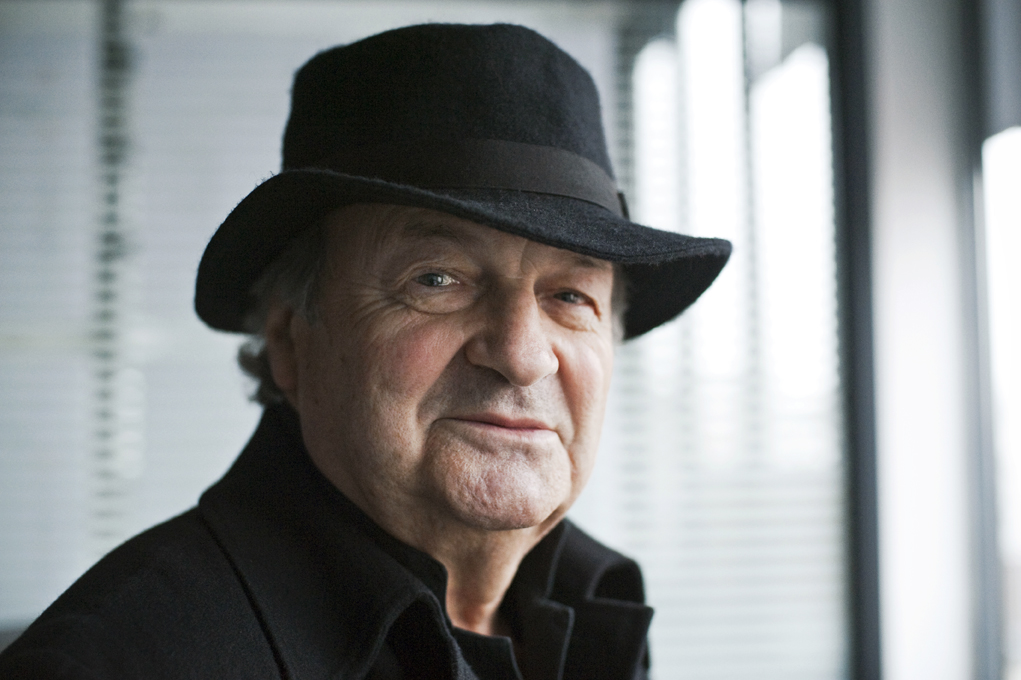
Conductor Emeritus Michel Tabachnik

=== List of chief conductors ===
- Jacek Kaspszyk (1991–1995)
- Hans Drewanz (1995–1997)
- Viktor Liberman (1997–1999)
- Michel Tabachnik (2005–2011)
- Stefan Asbury (2011–2015)
- Eivind Gullberg Jensen (2022–present)
