= Burning Flowers =

1985 Norwegian drama film

- Directed by: Eva Dahr; Eva Isaksen
- Written by: Lars Saabye Christensen
- Starring: Torstein Hølmebakk; Lise Fjeldstad
- Release date: 1985
- Running time: 84 minutes
- Country: Norway
- Language: Norwegian

Burning Flowers (Norwegian: Brennende blomster) is a 1985 Norwegian drama film directed by Eva Dahr and Eva Isaksen, based on a story by Lars Saabye Christensen, and starring Torstein Hølmebakk and Lise Fjeldstad. The film is about the teenager Hermann (Hølmebakk) who develops a relationship with the middle-aged Rosa (Fjeldstad).
