= The Monitor (film) =

- Directed by: Pål Sletaune
- Written by: Pål Sletaune
- Produced by: Turid Øversveen
- Starring: Noomi Rapace; Kristoffer Joner; Vetle Qvenild Werring
- Cinematography: John Andreas Andersen
- Edited by: Jon Endre Mørk
- Music by: Fernando Velázquez
- Production company: 4½ Film
- Distributed by: SF Norge
- Release date: October 7, 2011 (Norway)
- Running time: 96 minutes
- Countries: Norway; Germany; Sweden
- Languages: Norwegian; Swedish; English
- Budget: 25 million kr (US$4.05 million)

The Monitor (original title: Babycall; titled The Monitor under US release) is a 2011 Norwegian thriller film written and directed by Pål Sletaune and starring Noomi Rapace. The original title, Babycall, is the Norwegian/Swedish term for a baby monitor; the film maintained this title upon release in Europe and Australia. The film was released on October 7, 2011 in Norway, and was released direct-to-video in the United States on July 24, 2012.

== Plot ==
Anna and her son Anders, move into a large flat outside Oslo. Anna fears that her violent ex-husband will find them, as they have been relocated for safety. They receive occasional visits from child care workers Grete and Ole, who warn Anna that her ex-husband may reopen a custody case for Anders. Initially, Anna forces Anders to sleep in her room, but when the case workers discourage this, she buys a babycall (baby monitor) to keep an eye on him.

At an electronics store, Anna meets Helge, a shy man whose mother is terminally ill in the hospital. They develop a fragile friendship, sharing their personal struggles. Anna, being an overprotective mother, finds solace in Helge's understanding of her situation, while Helge appreciates Anna's refusal to let go of her son.

One night, Anna hears disturbing sounds on the babycall, including screaming. Terrified, she rushes to Anders' room, but he is peacefully asleep. Anna consults Helge, who explains that the monitor can pick up other frequencies nearby. They try to locate the source of the screams on a map drawn by Anders.

Later, Anders introduces Anna to a boy who resembles him and claims he is his new friend. Anna becomes suspicious of the boy, who remains silent and distant towards her. Anna discovers a disturbing picture drawn by Anders, depicting a dead body covered in blood near their apartment complex. She attributes this to the influence of Anders' friend.

Anna visits a nearby lake, but when she takes Anders there, they end up in a parking lot instead. Anna suspects foul play and follows a woman she believes to be connected to the screaming on the babycall. She witnesses a man drowning the boy who claimed to be Anders' friend. In an attempt to save the boy, Anna jumps into the water but blacks out.

Anna wakes up in a hospital, confused and wet. Upon leaving, she goes to retrieve Anders from school, but the principal accuses her of child abuse and forbids her from taking him. Disregarding the warning, Anna brings Anders home, only to find the front door open.

Inside, she encounters Ole, who informs her that his partner has left, leaving Anna's fate in his hands. Ole advances on Anna, making her uncomfortable and threatening her. Anna seeks refuge at Helge's workplace and invites him for dinner. During their meal, there is a knock at the door. Helge opens it to find no one, but Anders' friend appears and shows Helge bruises on his body before running to Anders' room.

Helge tries to follow the boy but is stopped by Anna, who yells at him. Disheartened, Helge leaves, and Anna calls out to him from the window, but he doesn't return. Panicked, Anna leaves the flat to evade Ole. The next day, Ole returns with news that Anna's ex-husband is coming to take Anders away. In a state of panic, Anna stabs Ole with a pair of scissors, killing him just outside her door.

Helge arrives and pounds on the door, desperately trying to get Anna to open it. He enters the apartment to find Anna sitting on the windowsill with Anders' arms wrapped around her. As Helge approaches, Anna leans forward and falls off the windowsill. Helge rushes downstairs to find Anna's body but no sign of Anders.

Later, it is revealed that Anna's husband had killed Anders years ago before taking his own life. Helge discovers a drawing by Anna depicting a grave near the apartment complex. In the forest, he finds a buried body, presumed to be the boy who claimed to be Anders' friend, murdered by his abusive parents.

In the final scene, Helge sits next to Anna's body and recounts the story of a boy and his mother. The movie concludes with a happy scene of Anna and Anders walking together in the forest, then sitting by the water's edge.

== Reception ==
Rotten Tomatoes gives the film an approval rating of 75% based on 24 reviews, and an average rating of 5.90/10. Several critics singled out Rapace's performance for praise while giving mixed reviews to the film.

Kim Newman of Empire called it "genuinely creepy" and summarised it as "another Scandinavian thriller that will nestle uncomfortably in your head". Philip French of The Observer judged "The film and Rapace command our attention, though at the end one feels Norway has used up the whole of this year's quota of red herrings." Peter Bradshaw of The Guardian was less positive, writing "It's a great idea for a thriller - but then other plotlines get muddled in, and everything unravels into a cop-out." Henry Fitzherbert of the Daily Express wrote "It's a great idea but there are too many confusing sub-plots and no satisfactory resolution."
