= Brødre i blodet =

1996 novel by Ingvar Ambjørnsen

Brødre i blodet (Brothers in blood) is a Norwegian novel by Ingvar Ambjørnsen, published in 1996. Ambjørnsen received the Booksellers Prize for the publication. The novel is the third in a seven-volume series (as of 2020) which also includes: View to Paradise (1993), The Bird Dance (1995), Love Me Tomorrow (1999), Echoes of a Friend (2019), No One Can Help Me (2020), and Yoko Ono is a Charlatan (2020). It was adapted into the Norwegian feature-length film Elling in 2001, directed by Petter Næss.

== See also ==
- Elling
