= Andrine Sæther =

Norwegian actress (born 1964)

- Born: 7 September 1964 (age 61); Oslo, Norway
- Occupation: Actress
- Spouse: Lars Lillo-Stenberg (2005–present)

Andrine Sæther (born 7 September 1964) is a Norwegian actress.

She had her début at the National Theatre in 1995, and has worked there since. Here she has acted in roles such as "Varja" in Chekhov's The Cherry Orchard, and "Bolette" in Ibsen's The Lady from the Sea. In 1997 she had her début as a movie actress, in a small role in the film Livredd. The same year she acted in the popular Budbringeren, a role for which she received an Amanda nomination. She has also acted in several made-for-TV productions, such as Blind gudinne (1997) and Berlinerpoplene (2007).

In 2005 Sæther married singer and songwriter Lars Lillo-Stenberg, known from the band deLillos. When the celebrity magazine Se og Hør published pictures from the ceremony without permission, the two sued the magazine for invasion of privacy. They lost the lawsuit, but Sæther and Lillo-Stenberg have declared their intentions to pursue the case in the European Court of Human Rights in Strasbourg.

== Select filmography ==
Year	Film	Role	Other notes
1997	Budbringeren	Line Groberg	
1997	Blind gudinne	Cecilie Vibe	TV
1997	Salige er de som tørster	Cecilie Vibe	TV
1998	Only Clouds Move the Stars	Melinda	
1999	Sofies verden	Sofie's mother	TV
2001	Amatørene	Helle	
2004	Hawaii, Oslo	Social Worker	
2007	Kodenavn Hunter	Vibeke Rønningen	TV
2007	Berlinerpoplene	Torunn Neshov	TV
