= Johannes Joner =

Norwegian actor and voice actor

- Born: November 1, 1958 (age 67); Haugesund
- Notable work: Lillegutt in Blåfjell; Erling in Over stork og stein Roger Radcliffe in 101 Dalmatians (Norwegian voice)
- Relatives: Kristoffer Joner (Cousin)

Johannes Joner (born 1 November 1958) is a Norwegian actor and voice actor.

Joner graduated from the Statens Teaterhøgskole in 1981.

His screen roles include Lillegutt in Blåfjel and Erling in Over stork og stein.

Joner dubbed the voice of Roger Radcliffe in 101 Dalmatians, Jake in The Rescuers Down Under, Pleakey in Lilo & Stitch and Hubie in The Pebble and the Penguin
