= Junk Mail (film) =

1997 Norwegian film directed by Pål Sletaune

- DVD cover for Junk Mail
- Directed by: Pål Sletaune
- Written by: Pål Sletaune; Jonny Halberg
- Produced by: Peter Bøe; Dag Nordahl
- Starring: Robert Skjærstad; Andrine Sæther; Per Egil Aske; Eli Anne Linnestad; Trond Høvik; Henriette Steenstrup; Ådne Olav Sekkelsten; Trond Fausa Aurvaag
- Cinematography: Kjell Vassdal
- Edited by: Pål Gengenbach
- Music by: Joachim Holbek
- Distributed by: Lions Gate Films
- Release date: 21 February 1997
- Running time: 83 minutes
- Language: Norwegian
- Budget: $2.1 million

Junk Mail (Norwegian: Budbringeren) is a 1997 Norwegian film directed by Pål Sletaune. The film was selected as the Norwegian entry for the Best Foreign Language Film at the 70th Academy Awards, but was not accepted as a nominee.

== Plot ==
Junk Mail tells the story of lazy, nosy postman Roy Amundsen who has a bad habit of dipping into the mail of his customers. He takes this further when he finds the keys to the apartment of laundry assistant Line Groberg and decides to investigate her apartment. This leads to all manner of complications when he saves her life and then discovers that she's been coerced into covering up a crime and looking after money for a local gangster.

== Reception ==
The aggregate site Rotten Tomatoes gives the film an approval rating of 93% based on 15 reviews, and an average rating of 7.43/10.

The film was selected as the Norwegian entry for the Best Foreign Language Film at the 70th Academy Awards, but was not accepted as a nominee.

The film won many awards, including Best Actress for Eli Anne Linnestad, Best Actor for Robert Skjærstad and Best Film for Pål Sletaune at the Amanda Awards in Norway, and the Mercedes-Benz Award at the Cannes Film Festival.

== See also ==
- List of submissions to the 70th Academy Awards for Best Foreign Language Film
- List of Norwegian submissions for the Academy Award for Best Foreign Language Film
