= Ola Otnes =

Norwegian actor

Ola Otnes (born 2 September 1951 in Rendalen, Hedmark) is a Norwegian actor who has been active on screen since the 1970s.

He was born in what is now Rendalen Municipality. He was employed at Den Nationale Scene from 1978 to 1989, then at Teater Ibsen. On screen he has mainly appeared on Norwegian television, except for his small part in The Witches, a British film adaptation of the novel written by Roald Dahl.
