= 37 1/2 =

2005 film by Vibeke Idsøe

- Film poster
- Norwegian: 37 og et halvt
- Directed by: Vibeke Idsøe
- Written by: Vibeke Idsøe
- Starring: Helén Vikstvedt
- Release date: 28 January 2005
- Running time: 101 minutes
- Country: Norway
- Language: Norwegian

37 1/2 (Norwegian: 37 og et halvt) is a 2005 Norwegian comedy-drama film directed by Vibeke Idsøe, starring Helén Vikstvedt. Selma (Vikstvedt) is a journalist in her late 30s, having a mid-life crisis.
