= Lars Ramslie =

Norwegian writer

- Born: 15 February 1974 (age 52)
- Occupation: Novelist

Lars Ramslie (born 15 February 1974) is a Norwegian novelist. He made his literary début in 1997 with the novel Biopsi, for which he was awarded the Tarjei Vesaas' debutantpris. His novel Fatso from 2003 was basis for the film Fatso from 2008.

== Works ==
- Fjellet, geværet, vannet (2023, novel)
