= Aldri mer 13! =

- Directed by: Sirin Eide
- Written by: Sirin Eide; Maureen Thomas
- Produced by: Peter Bøe; Dag Nordahl
- Starring: Sofie Cappelen; Martine Karlsen; Svein Roger Karlsen; Silje Andresen
- Cinematography: Kjell Vassdal
- Edited by: Pål Gengenbach
- Music by: Knut Halmrast
- Release date: 1996
- Running time: 80 minutes
- Country: Norway
- Language: Norwegian

Aldri mer 13! (13 Never Again!) is a Norwegian film from 1996, directed by Sirin Eide and starring Sofie Cappelen.

== Plot summary ==
Seventh-grade Rikke is one of the most popular girls in her class, but one day arrives a new girl, Bea, who begins to take her place in the classroom. As the newcomer makes herself at home, an unhealthy competition develops between the two. A relationship that the two have to settle before they can be friends, and explore the future joys and sorrows of youth together.

== Cast ==
- Sofie Stange Cappelen
- Martine Karlsen
- Anne Krigsvoll
- Svein Roger Karlsen

== Reception ==
The film received a "die throw" of 6 (out of 6) in Romerikes Blad, 4 in Bergensavisen and Drammens Tidende, as well as a favourable review in Nordlys and a mediocre review in Rogalands Avis.
