= Sven Nordin =

Norwegian actor (born 1957)

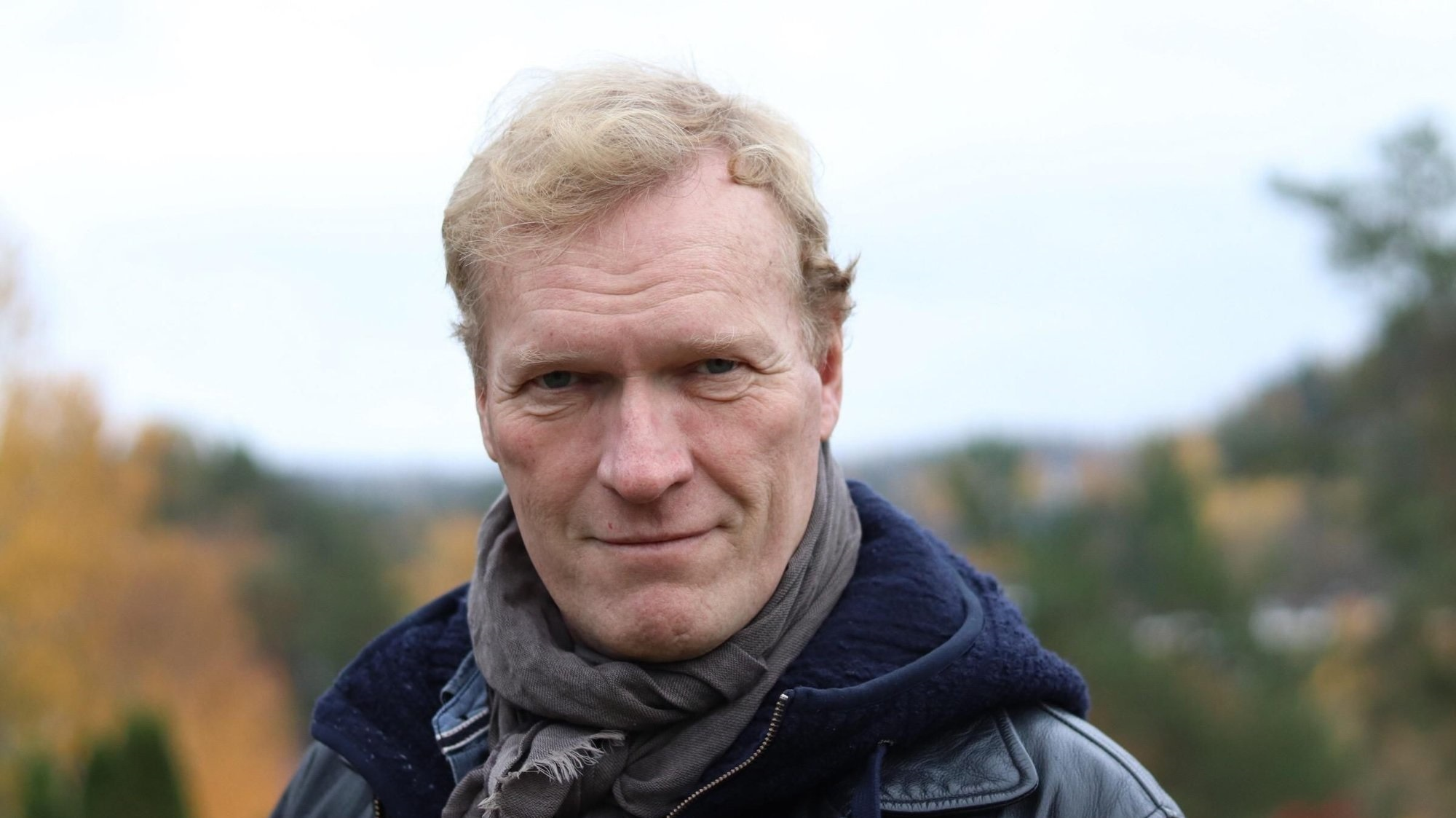
- Sven Nordin (2018)
- Born: 6 February 1957 (age 68); Oslo, Norway
- Occupation: Actor
- Notable work: Mot i brøstet and Elling

Sven Audun Nordin (born 6 February 1957) is a Norwegian actor. He was hired by Oslo Nye Teater in the autumn of 1981 and had his debut in the play "Vikinger" by Johan Borgen. He is best known for his roles as Nils in the situation comedy Mot i brøstet, Kjell Bjarne in the Academy Award–nominated film Elling, Doffen in action-comedy film Børning (2014), and the title role of William Wisting in the nordic noir series Wisting (2019-present).

== Select filmography ==
- 1985: The Last Place on Earth as Tryggve Gran
- 1985: Rød snø (TV series)
- 1987: Over grensen as Jensen, a witness
- 1987: På stigende kurs
- 1990: Smykketyven
- 1991: For dagene er onde
- 1993: Mot i brøstet (TV series)
- 1995: Pakten
- 1999: Suffløsen
- 2001: Elling
- 2002: Shackleton (TV)
- 2002: I Am Dina
- 2003: Mamma, pappa, barn
- 2005: Deadline Torp (Tv series)
- 2005: An Enemy of the People
- 2005: Love Me Tomorrow
- 2005: Hos Martin (TV series)
- 2006: An Immortal Man as Knud Ibsen
- 2010: Shameless
- 2011: Sons of Norway
- 2012: Lilyhammer
- 2012: Two Lives
- 2014: Børning
- 2016: Børning 2
- 2016: A Serious Game
- 2017: Valkyrien (TV series)
- 2019: Wisting (TV series)
- 2021: Rådebank
