= Eva Isaksen =

Norwegian film director

- Born: May 22, 1956 (age 68)
- Occupation: Film director

Eva Isaksen (born 22 May 1956) is a Norwegian film director. She directed her first feature film Burning Flowers (Brennende blomster 1985) with Eva Dahr, and has worked as an assistant on a number of films, including Sweetwater (1988) by Lasse Glomm, Wayfarers (Landstrykere 1989) by Ola Solum, and The Dive (Dykket 1989) by Tristan de Vere Cole. In 1990 she directed Death at Oslo Central (Døden på Oslo S), about the two boys Pelle and Proffen, based on the novels for young people by Ingvar Ambjørnsen, a Norwegian author living in Hamburg. Two years later she presented her third feature film Homo Falsus (Det perfekte mord 1992).
