= Eivind Gullberg Jensen =

Norwegian conductor (born 1972)

- Born: 1 April 1972 (age 52); Horten, Norway
- Occupation: Conductor
- Instrument: Classical music
- Years active: 2009-present
- Spouse: Mari Eriksmoen
- Website: www.eivindgullbergjensen.com

Eivind Gullberg Jensen (born 1 April 1972) is a Norwegian conductor.

== Biography ==
Jensen studied violin and conducting in Trondheim. He continued his conducting studies with Jorma Panula in Stockholm and in Vianna with Leopold Hager. Jensen has also participated in conducting master classes with Kurt Masur and David Zinman. From 2009 to 2014, Jensen was chief conductor of the NDR Radiophilharmonie.

In June 2019, Bergen National Opera announced the appointment of Jensen as its next general director and artistic director, effective in 2021. In September 2024, Bergen National Opera announced an extension of Jensen's contract through 31 December 2030.

In 2018, Jensen first guest-conducted the Noord Nederlands Orkest (NNO). Jensen returned to the NNO for two additional guest-conducting engagements, the most recent in September 2021. In October 2021, the NNO announced the appointment of Jensen as its next chief conductor, effective with the 2022-2023 season. In August 2024, the NNO announced an extension of Jensen's contract as its chief conductor through the 2026-2027 season.

Jensen is married to the Norwegian soprano Mari Eriksmoen, and lives in Bergen with their two daughters. He also has two children from a prior relationship.

Cultural offices
Preceded by Eiji Ōue	Chief Conductor, NDR Radiophilharmonie; 2009–2014	Succeeded by Andrew Manze
Preceded by Mary Miller	Artistic and General Director, Bergen National Opera; 2021–present	Succeeded by incumbent
Preceded by Stefan Asbury	Chief Conductor, Noord Nederlands Orkest; 2022–present	Succeeded by incumbent
