= Gurin with the Foxtail =

- Solan, Ludvig og Gurin med reverompa
- Directed by: John M. Jacobsen; Nille Tystad
- Written by: Kjell Aukrust; Anders Hatlo (dialogue); Vibeke Idsøe; Ingrid Vollan (dialect help)
- Produced by: John M. Jacobsen
- Music by: Kjetil Bjerkestrand; Vittorio Monti
- Production companies: Filmkameratene A/S; AnimagicNet A/S; SF Studios
- Release date: August 7, 1998
- Running time: 76 minutes
- Country: Norway
- Language: Norwegian
- Budget: NOK 35 million (~US$ 4.2 million)
- Box office: NOK 26 million (Norway)

Gurin with the Foxtail (Norwegian: Solan, Ludvig og Gurin med reverompa) is a 1998 Norwegian traditionally animated adventure comedy film directed by John M. Jacobsen and Nille Tystad. It is loosely based on Kjell Aukrust's 1991 book Gurin med reverompa.

== Plot ==
Fjøsnissen Gurin can not help but notice pranks and tricks (often called revestreker in Norwegian, this translates to fox strokes), until suddenly he wakes up one day only to find himself having a foxtail. The rumor about the foxtail spreads quickly among his village, and he is subjected to vicious bullying.

What is worse is that the rich widow Stengenføhn-Gnad from Oslo's best western edge wants the tail to adorn herself with. She tries to hire Solan Gundersen (En. Sonny Duckworth) (a cheerful and optimistic magpie), who together with his sidekick Ludvig (En. Lambert) (a nervous, pessimistic and melancholic hedgehog) has left Flåklypa to start a detective agency in Oslo. But instead, he seeks out Gurin to warn him of the rich widow. He gets help from Reodor Felgen (En. Theodore Rimspoke), who designs the machine Foxtail Detector to lead Solan and Ludvig on their quest.

== Box office ==
The film was a great audience success with over 700,000 tickets sold and a gross of 26 million Krone ($3.2 million) when it went to Norwegian cinemas.
