= Sofie Cappelen =

Norwegian-born actress

- Born: February 2, 1982 (age 44); Oslo, Norway
- Occupation: Actress

Sofie Stange Cappelen (born February 2, 1982) is a Norwegian actress.

== Biography ==
Cappelen began her career as a child actor. She was a member of the Jorunn Kirkenær Children's Ballet, and made several TV appearances as a dancer and actor, including on NRK in the 1989 Christmas series Vertshuset den gyldne hale and in the children's show Midt i Smørøyet. At the age of 11, she made her stage debut at the National Theatre of Norway in Sverre Brandt's Reisen til Julestjernen.

At 13, she played the lead role of Rikke Eriksen in the feature film Aldri mer 13! ("Never Again 13!"), directed by Sirin Eide.

She played Victoria Lunde on the long-running prime-time soap opera Hotel Cæsar, from its first season in 1998, when she was 16. After four years' absence while living in New York and studying acting at the Lee Strasberg Institute, she returned to the role in 2009.

In 2003 she played Inga, the female lead in the Israeli comedy Halleluja, which won at the Haifa International Film Festival.

== Other work ==
She has published two children's books, Godnattareglen (2011) and Bjørnis og de røde prikkene (2015). She owns the publishing company Eventyrforlaget and practices as a clinical psychologist.

== Personal life ==
She is a member of the Cappelen family. Her father is writer Anders Cappelen and her grandfather was the dramatist Peder Wright Cappelen.

While in New York, she married American designer Brendon Babenzien; they subsequently divorced. She has a daughter, born in 2011, with photographer Alexander Kayiambakis.

== Filmography ==
=== Television ===
- Vertshuset den gyldne hale, (1989) as Lussi girl (credited as Sofie Cappelen Stange)
- Hotel Cæsar, (1998–, 2009–10), as Victoria Lunde
- Halleluja, (2003) as Inga

=== Films ===
- Aldri mer 13!, (1996) as Rikke
- Sophie's World, (1999) as Maid Marion
