= Only Clouds Move the Stars =

- Original theatrical release poster
- Directed by: Torun Lian
- Written by: Torun Lian
- Produced by: John M. Jacobsen
- Starring: Thea Sofie Rusten; Jan Tore Kristoffersen; Anneke von der Lippe
- Cinematography: Svein Krøvel
- Edited by: Trygve Hagen
- Music by: Jørn Christensen
- Distributed by: SF Norway
- Release date: 24 August 1998
- Running time: 97 minutes
- Country: Norway
- Language: Norwegian
- Box office: NOK6.7 million ($750,000) (Norway)

Only Clouds Move the Stars (Norwegian: Bare skyer beveger stjernene) is a 1998 Norwegian drama film written and directed by Torun Lian. Based on her novel of the same name, the film was Lian's directorial debut. The film was a critical and commercial success. It won the Amanda Award in 1999 in the category Best film, and has received more awards internationally than any other Norwegian film. It was the Norwegian submission for the Academy Award for Best Foreign Language Film.

== Synopsis ==
The film introduces 11-year-old Maria in her little brother Pilten's funeral. Following her son's death, Maria's mother becomes engulfed in her own sorrow, and distances herself from Maria. While spending the summer holiday with her grandparents in Bergen, Maria meets Jakob, a boy around her age. The two become friends, and spend time together exploring the city, and having discussions about life and death. Through her friendship with Jakob, Maria comes to terms with her mother and their loss.

== Cast ==
- Thea Sofie Rusten as Maria
- Jan Tore Kristoffersen as Jakob
- Anneke von der Lippe as Maria's mother
- Jørgen Langhelle as Maria's father

== Release ==
Only Clouds Move the Stars had its theatrical release on 24 August 1998. The film was seen by 10,000 people during its opening weekend. It went on to become the second most viewed Norwegian film of 1998, beaten only by Gurin with the Foxtail, which was also produced by John M. Jacobsen.

Norwegian critics were almost unanimously positive about the film. Jon Selås of Verdens Gang praised the film for its "magical moments", and Rusten and Kristoffersen for their interplay and "fantastic" depictions of the main characters. He lauded Lian for "making the fundamentally important observation that children aren't half adults or unfinished individuals; they are children, they are human." Dagbladet's reviewer was equally positive about the two leads, who she felt "carried the lion's share of the film". She rated the film 5/6, and urged moviegoers to "bring a handkerchief."

The film also received favourable notices from American publications. Variety's Gunnar Rehlin found the film to be "realistically told", and characterized it as "funny, sad and bittersweet by turns, with a conclusion that's optimistic but feels right." The Hollywood Reporter also commented positively on the film, acclaiming Lian for creating a "truly magical family film, in large part a result of her work with the two young players." The reviewer found Rusten to "embod[y] the fragile vulnerability of a young girl who feels that she has been deserted by everyone," and characterized Kristoffersen as a "delight as the irrepressible Jacob."

Only Clouds Move the Stars received awards at several international film festivals. The film was awarded a Crystal Bear at the Berlin International Film Festival's Kinderfilmfest. At the Lübeck Nordic Film Days, the film won the Nordic Film Institute's Award for Best Film, Children and Young People, and the Grand Prize for Best Feature. Other awards included the Audience Award and Best Actress Award at the Rouen Nordic Film Festival. Domestically, the film was nominated for four Amanda Awards, and won in the category Best Film. Torun Lian subsequently received the Ingmar Bergman-award for the film.

== See also ==
- List of submissions to the 71st Academy Awards for Best Foreign Language Film
- List of Norwegian submissions for the Academy Award for Best Foreign Language Film
