= Body Troopers =

- Directed by: Vibeke Idsøe
- Written by: Vibeke Idsøe
- Produced by: John M. Jacobsen
- Starring: Torbjörn T. Jensen; Jenny Skavlan; Kjersti Holmen; Rina Kelly; Benjamin Helstad; Lage Fosheim; Morten Faldaas; Harald Eia
- Release date: 4 October 1996
- Running time: 91 minutes
- Country: Norway
- Language: Norwegian
- Box office: NOK10.2 million

Body Troopers (Norwegian: Jakten på nyresteinen), also known as Chasing the Kidneystone, is a 1996 Norwegian children's film directed by Vibeke Idsøe, starring Torbjörn T. Jensen and Kjersti Holmen. Eight-year-old Simon shrinks himself to microscopic size in order to travel through his ailing grandfather's body in search of a kidney stone. On his journey he meets anthropomorphic characters such as the taste buds, white and red blood cells, and the vocal cords.

The film is based on the book Jakten på nyresteinen, also written by Idsøe.

It was the highest-grossing Norwegian film of the year.

== Awards ==
Award	Category	Recipient	Result
1997 Chicago International Children's Film Festival	Adult's Jury Award		Won
1997 Amanda Awards	Best Debut		Won
1997 Fantafestival	Best Special Effects, Grand Prize of European Fantasy Film in Silver		Won
1997 Fantasporto	Grand Prize of European Fantasy Film in Gold		Nominated
1997 Málaga International Week of Fantastic Cinema	Best Director, Best Film, Best Special Effects		Won

== See also ==
- Fantastic Voyage
- Resizing (fiction)
