= Bergen National Opera =

Norwegian opera company

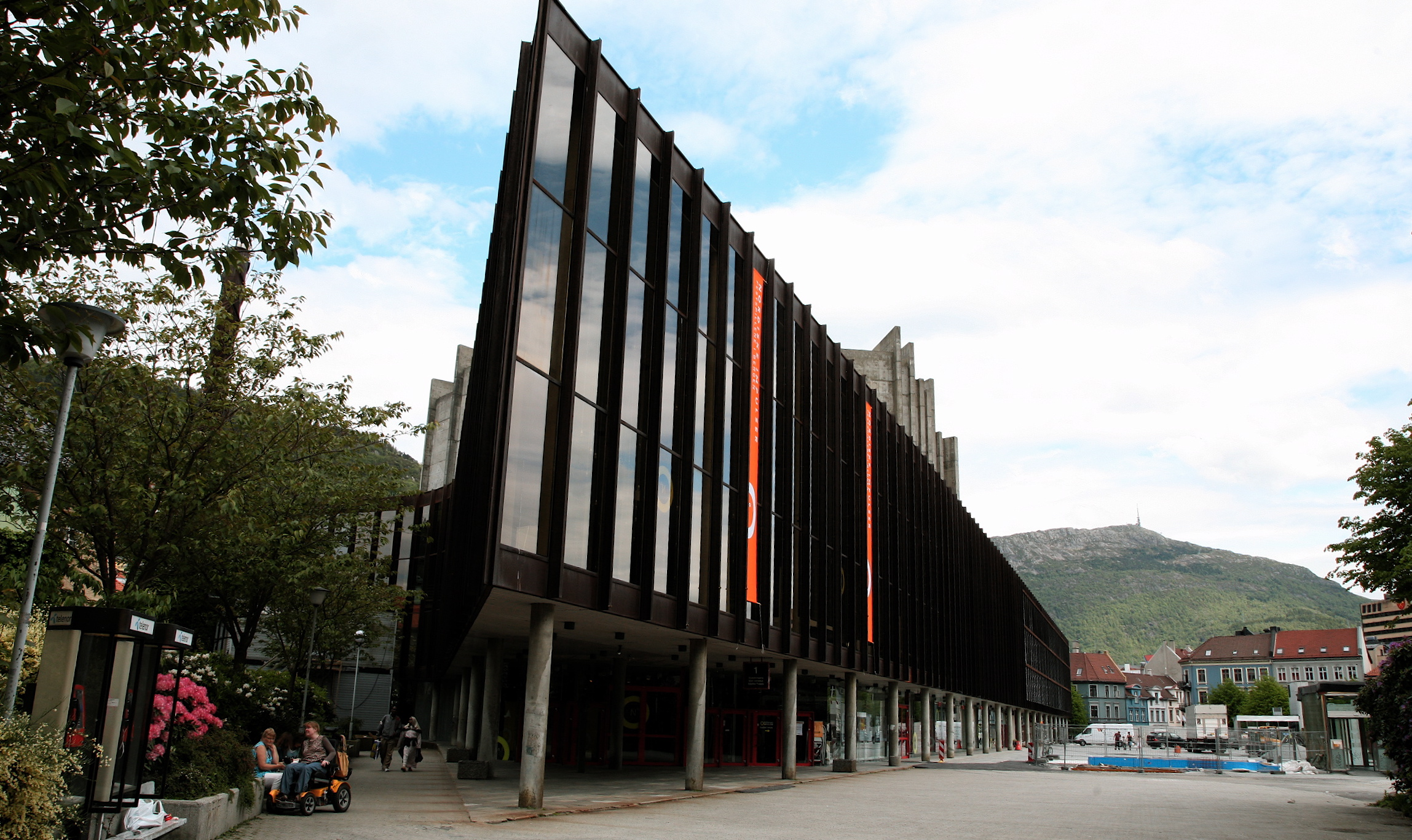
Grieg Hall, where the Bergen National Opera is based

Bergen National Opera (Norwegian: Bergen Nasjonale Opera) is a Norwegian opera company based in Bergen. The company has its administrative headquarters at the Grieghallen.

== History ==
Originally called Den Nye Opera (the new opera), Bergen National Opera was established as a foundation in 2005 by the Bergen Philharmonic Orchestra, Den Nationale Scene, Grieghallen and the Bergen International Festival. In 2007, Opera Vest became a part of the foundation, which aims to be the regional opera company for Western Norway. The company adopted the name Bergen Nasjonale Opera in 2012. The foundation is supported by the Ministry of Culture, the Vestland county, the city of Bergen, and private supporters. The company's principal artistic partners are the Bergen Philharmonic Orchestra and the Edvard Grieg Kor.

Past artistic directors have included Stein Olav Henrichsen (2005–2010) and Mary Miller (2010–2020). In June 2019, Bergen National Opera announced the appointment of Jensen as its next general director and artistic director, effective in 2021. In August 2024, the company announced the appointment of Hanne Eidsvåg Andersen as its next administrative director. In September 2024, Bergen National Opera announced an extension of Jensen's contract through 31 December 2030.

In addition to professional opera, the company also runs participatory programs for children, teenagers and young adults. The Summer Academy "Opera by fjord" at Oseana is arranged every year since 2021, and is now for young singers, orchestra musicians, conductors and repetiteurs over 18.

== Artistic directors ==
- Stein Olav Henrichsen (2005–2010)
- Mary Miller (2010–2020)
- Eivind Gullberg Jensen (2021–present)
