= Otto Jespersen (comedian) =

Norwegian comedian (born 1954)

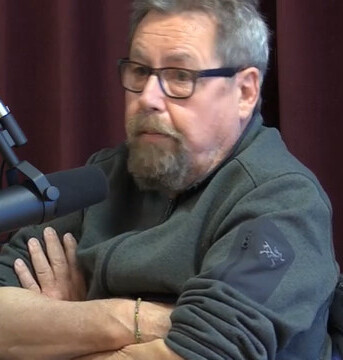
- Jespersen in 2023
- Born: 21 July 1954 (age 72); Norway
- Occupations: Film actor, comedian

Hans Otto Jespersen (born 21 July 1954) is a Norwegian comedian, actor and television personality. He starred as the title role of the 2010 film Trollhunter and the Norwegian voice actor of Manny in the Ice Age films.

== Biography ==
At the age of 19 Jespersen became a Marxist-Leninist, and was briefly a member of the Communist organization Red Youth. Working in a local radio station, Radio Nova in Oslo, in 1988 Jespersen and collaborators Stig Holmer and Charlo Halvorsen launched the magazine programme Revolvermagasinet on Norwegian national radio. This night-time show featured unusual interviews. In 1992, the three again teamed up for The Show - storbymoro for enslige i Utkant-Norge on national television. The Show became the Norwegian candidate for the Rose d'Or in 1993, but several judges left the theatre before the programme was over.

During the 1994 Winter Olympics, Jespersen was hired as stunt reporter for Norwegian national television. This led to the first of the four O.J. series, in which Jespersen interviewed celebrities and later created such characters as Tårnfrid, Wirrum, Den ensomme rytter, Baron Blod, Nazi-Per, and Birger as well as Friskusen. He has also made two seasons of Trotto Libre with Trond Kirkvaag.

In 2002 he joined fellow comedians Silje Stang and Thomas Giertsen to host the weekly comedy show Torsdagsklubben, gaining a reputation for his scathing closing monologue. Stang and Giertsen had formerly run the same show concept under the name Mandagsklubben.

In the autumn of 2002, Jespersen's closing monologue targeted the Prime Minister Kjell Magne Bondevik, ridiculing the man's medication use and his unpopularity. He finished the programme by encouraging "all good forces'" to invite Christer Pettersson, a suspect in the murder of Swedish Prime Minister Olof Palme, to Oslo. Bondevik denounced the monologue in an interview calling it cowardly and distasteful, sparking debate about the monologue in Norway. In the wake of the controversy, Jespersen received a number of death threats.

He burned an American flag live on television in protest against the coming 2003 invasion of Iraq.

His television show Rikets Røst premiered in early 2005. Among the show's recurring contributors are and were Zahid Ali, a Norwegian-Pakistani comedian; Pia Haraldsen; and Espen Eckbo, an actor. In spring 2006, while shooting a stunt for the show in the city of Ålesund, Jespersen and Mayor Arve Tonning lit a bonfire in the centre of town and burned some Norwegian books and paper money. To the mayor's consternation, Jespersen then added several pages from the Bible's Old Testament, leading to national press coverage.

In 2008, when Jespersen mourned the fleas and lice on Holocaust victims, a Jerusalem Post opinion article decried Norwegian television channel TV 2's defence of this incident, using it as an example of growing anti-Semitism and anti-Israeli sentiments in Norway.
