= Døden på Oslo S =

- Norwegian DVD/VHS cover
- Directed by: Eva Isaksen
- Written by: Book: Ingvar Ambjørnsen; Script: Axel Hellstenius; Eva Isaksen; Bibi Moslet; Philip Øgaard
- Produced by: Harald Ohrvik
- Starring: Håvard Bakke; Tommy Karlsen; Helle Beck Figenschow
- Cinematography: Philip Øgaard
- Edited by: Pål Gengenbach
- Music by: Kjartan Kristiansen
- Production company: Norsk Film A/S
- Release date: August 20, 1990
- Running time: 94 minutes
- Country: Norway
- Language: Norwegian
- Box office: $2.05 million (Norway)

Døden på Oslo S (meaning "The death at Oslo Central Station") is a Norwegian film released in 1990. Set in Oslo in the late eighties, it is based on a book by Ingvar Ambjørnsen from his series Pelle og Proffen. It was the highest-grossing Norwegian film of the year.

== Plot ==
The film is about the two teenage boys, Pelle and Proffen, who try to help Pelle's girlfriend, Lena, overcome a drug problem. She is only 15 years old, and they initially meet at a snack bar in downtown Oslo. She has been abused by a social worker at a home for troubled teens. While they try to help Lena she runs away, they get beat up, and watch people overdose at the central train station in Oslo.

The film deals with issues including drugs, troubled teens and their parents, and child pornography. It's also about Pelle's and Proffen's families and their differing backgrounds: Pelle's parents are former hippies and very liberal; while Proffen's parents are older and conservative.

== Production ==
The scene where Lena is at Pelle's home for the first time and he suggests they spend the night together, was shot on one of the first days of filming. In the scene, 16-year-old Helle Beck Figenschow is seen removing all her clothes in front of Håvard Bakke. Asked later if he had seen a naked girl before, Bakke said, "Hehe, yes, but not many!"
