= Pål Sletaune =

Norwegian film director

- Born: 4 March 1960 (age 65); Oslo, Norway
- Occupations: Film director and photographer
- Spouse: Sara Johnsen
- Awards: Amanda Award for Junk Mail for best Norwegian film (1997); Fritt Ord Honorary Award for 22. juli (2020)

Pål Sletaune (born 4 March 1960) is a Norwegian film director and photographer. His films include Junk Mail, Naboer and The Monitor.

He was awarded the Amanda Award in 1997, and the Fritt Ord Honorary Award in 2020.

== Early life ==
Born in Oslo he attended Asker high school and studied still photography at Sogn vocational school.

== Career ==
Sletaune's film Junk Mail about a snooping Oslo postman was awarded the Amanda Award for best Norwegian film in 1997. Among his other films are Amatørene (2001), the thriller Naboer (2005), and The Monitor (2011, originally known as Babycall) which starred Noomi Rapace. He famously rejected an offer to direct American Beauty.

Alongside other Norwegian film directors, Sletaune directed two episodes in the first season of Occupied, which was at the time the most expensive home television drama. In 2020, Sletaune directed the six episodes of the television series 22. juli. He was also the show's writer and creator, alongside his wife Sara Johnsen. He was awarded the Fritt Ord Honorary Award in 2020, along with Sara Johnsen.

== Selected filmography ==
- Merz (1991)
- Bingoplassen (1992)
- Eating Out (1993)
- Junk Mail (1997)
- Amatørene (2001)
- Naboer (2005)
- The Monitor (2011)
