= Ingvar Ambjørnsen =

Norwegian writer (1956–2025)

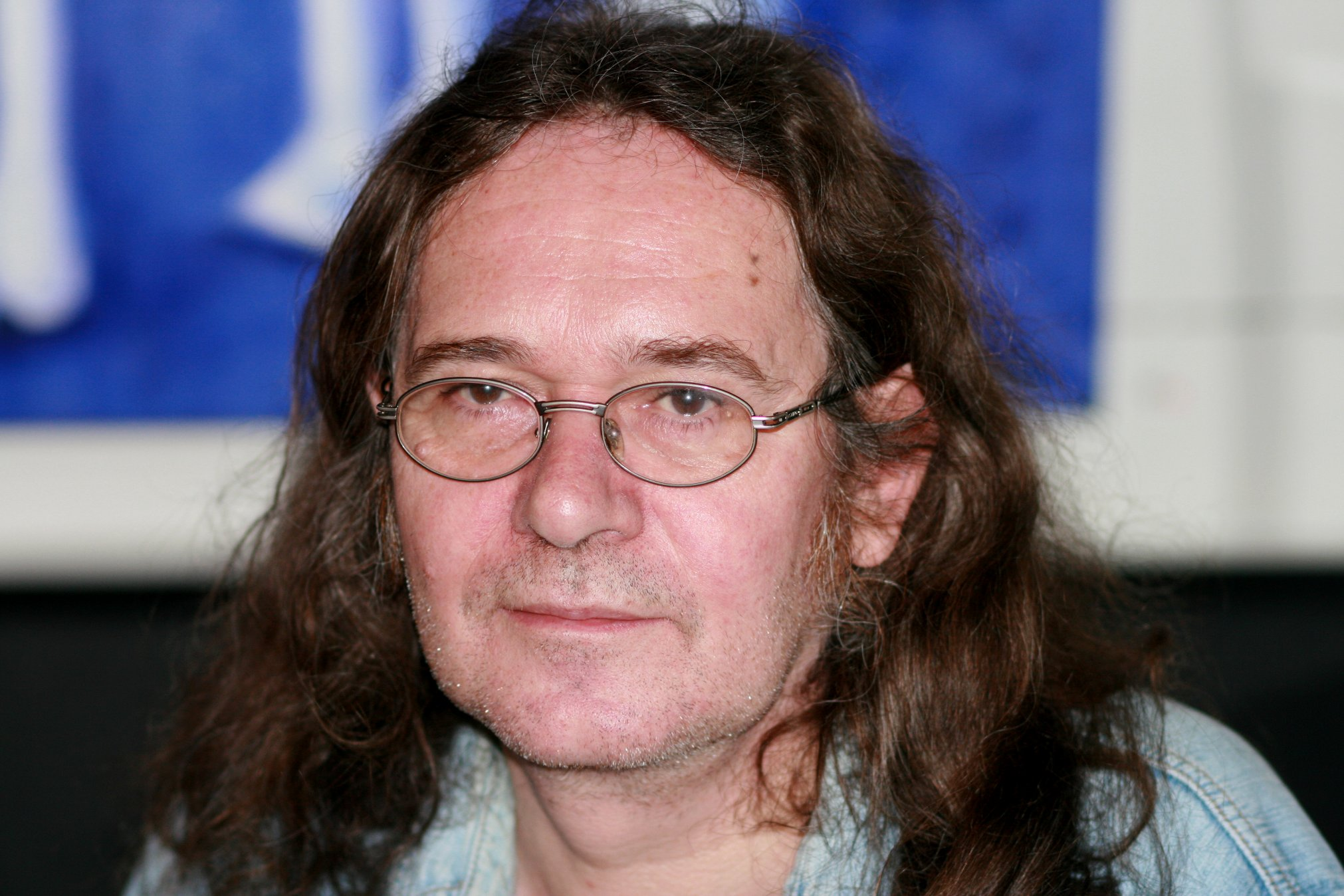
- Ambjørnsen in 2007.
- Born: Ingvar Even Ambjørnsen-Haefs; 20 May 1956; Tønsberg, Norway
- Died: 19 July 2025 (aged 69)
- Occupation: Novelist
- Spouse: Gabriele Haefs
- Writing career
- Notable work: Elling tetralogy
- Website: www.kjentfolk.no/forfattere/ambjornsen/

Ingvar Even Ambjørnsen-Haefs (20 May 1956 – 19 July 2025) was a Norwegian writer. He is best known for his "Elling" tetralogy: Utsikt til paradiset (1993), Fugledansen (1995), Brødre i blodet (1996), and Elsk meg i morgen (1999).

Brødre i blodet ("Blood brothers") was turned into a successful movie, entitled Elling, which received an Oscar nomination in the Best Foreign Film category in 2001. The English translation of the novel is called Beyond the Great Indoors.

== Life and career ==
Born in Tønsberg and raised in Larvik, his semi-autobiographical debut novel 23-salen ("The 23rd Row"), criticized mental health care in Norway. All of his novels take the side of the outsider, including his breakthrough novel Hvite Niggere ("White Niggers", 1986). The novel is about a young man who leads a life somewhat on the edges of normal society.

He is also known for his series for young people "Pelle og Proffen" which focuses on two teenage detectives who get involved in many mysteries and crimes involving drugs, pollution and neo-Nazism among other things. He started this project after reading some of Franklin W. Dixon's books about The Hardy Boys. The books Døden på Oslo S, Giftige Løgner, and De Blå Ulvene of this series were also turned into successful movies. In 2005 the book Drapene i Barkvik ("The murders in Barkvik") appeared, about the teenager Fillip Moberg attempting to solve an axe murder in a small Norwegian village.

In 2010 Ambjørnsen stopped writing novels; Farvel til romanen. 24 timer i grenseland, published in 2014, is about that decision and about how he came to write his novels.

Ambjørnsen received many prizes for his writing. Among them are the Norwegian Booksellers Association's prize for the best book of the 1980s for children and young adults (Pelle and Proffen books), the Tabu prize in 2001, the Telenor Culture Award in 2002, and the Brage Prize in 1995.

His three Samson and Roberto books have become particularly popular in Russia, in part due to the illustrations by Nikolay Vorontsov, which also contribute carefully orchestrated local Russian-related colloquialisms to the stories.

Until 2014, Ambjørnsen frequently reviewed books for the Norwegian newspaper VG. Beginning in 1985, he lived in Hamburg with his German wife and translator, Gabriele Haefs. In 2009 he was made an honorary citizen of Larvik. In 2025, he moved back to Norway after living in Germany for more than 40 years, and on 19 July of that year, he died at the age of 69. He had been battling severe COPD.

== Bibliography ==
=== Novels ===
- 23-salen (1981)
- Den siste revejakta (1983, crime novel)
- Hvite niggere (1987)
- Brødre i blodet (1996)
- Innocentia Park (2004)

=== Short story collections ===
- Natt til mørk morgen (1997)
- Sorgen i St. Peter Ording (2025)

Awards
Preceded by Roy Jacobsen, Håvard Rem	Recipient of the Cappelen Prize; 1988	Succeeded by Vigdis Hjorth
