= Håvard Bakke =

Norwegian actor, voice actor and singer

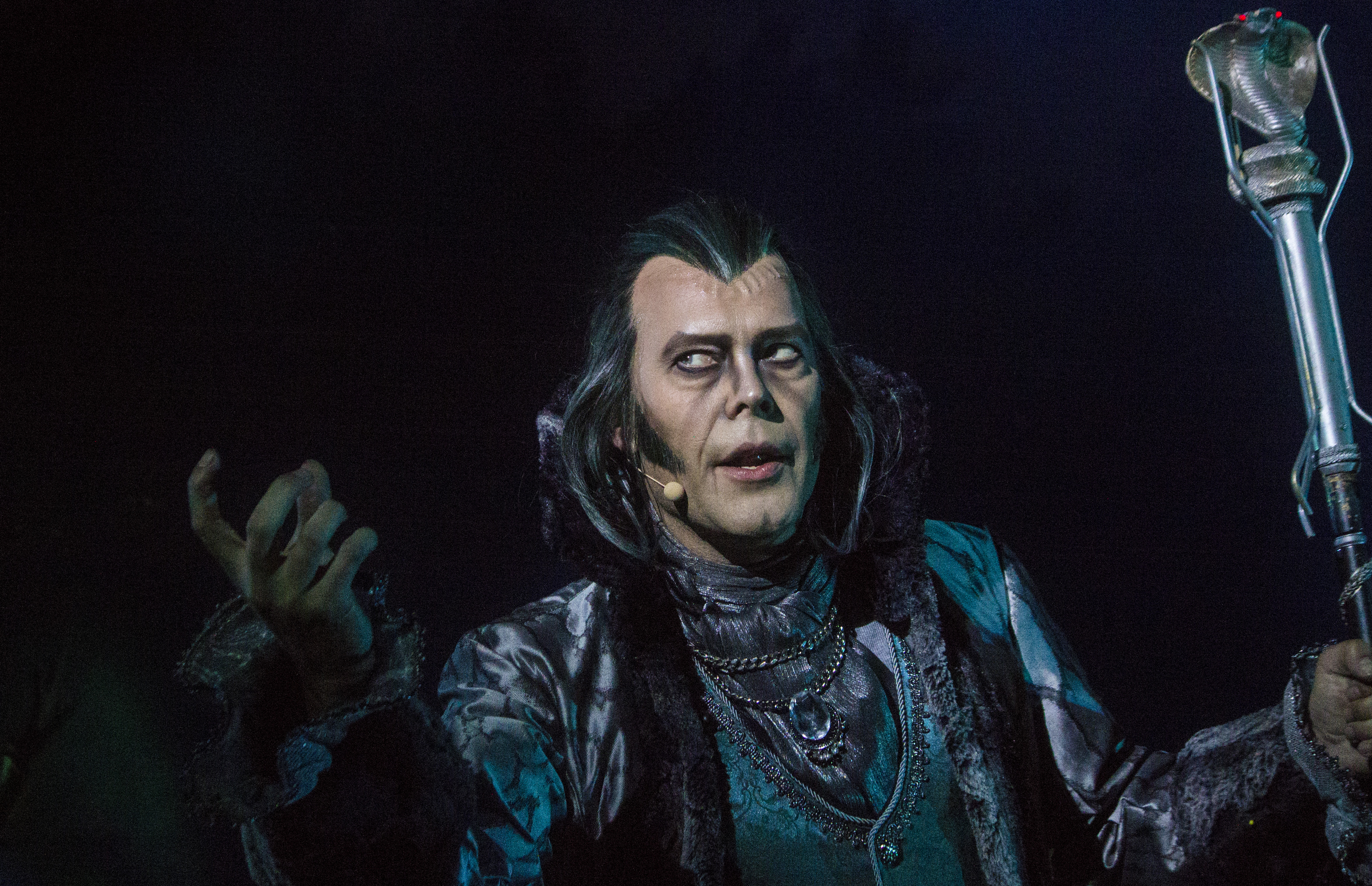
- Born: 4 April 1975 (age 50)
- Occupations: Actor singer voice actor
- Years active: 1990–
- Spouse: Ida Holten Worsøe
- Website: https://www.haavardbakke.net/

Håvard Bakke (born 2 April 1974) is a Norwegian actor, voice actor and singer.

Bakke became famous at 16 years old when he had the main role as Pelle in the movie Døden på Oslo S.

Bakke has been active as a singer in the band Sordid Conditions during the 90s and in later years the band Monomania.

Bakke is married to actress Ida Holten Worsøe.

Bakke has also voiced a lot of cartoons into Norwegian, noteworthy roles include Simba (The Lion King), Chance (Homeward Bound) and Hercules (Hercules).
