= Anders Baasmo Christiansen =

Norwegian actor originally from Hamar

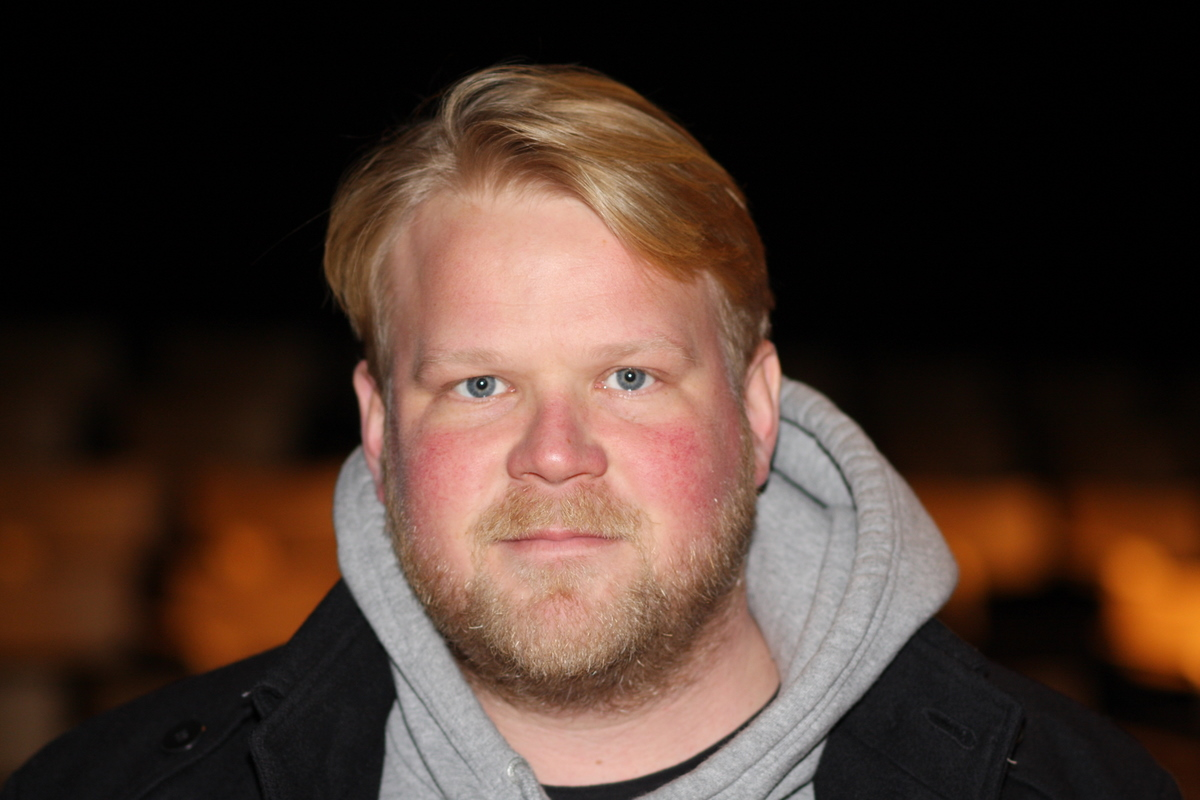
- Born: 26 January 1976 (age 50); Hamar, Norway
- Occupation: Actor
- Years active: 2003–present
- Partner: Marie Blokhus
- Children: 1

Anders Baasmo Christiansen (born 29 January 1976) is a Norwegian actor originally from Hamar.

Baasmo Christiansen earned his breakthrough in 2003 when he received the Amanda award for his performance in the Norwegian picture Buddy. He won the TV award Gullruten in 2007 for his portrait of Henrik Ibsen in the TV-series An Immortal Man (En udødelig mann) on NRK.

Baasmo Christiansen starred in the Swedish 2008 film Arn – The Kingdom at Road's End. That same year he won Norway's most prestigious actor's award, the Heddaprisen, for his interpretation of Hamlet. He then became the first actor to collect an Amanda, a Gullruten and a Hedda award.

He received the Shooting Stars Award, the annual acting award for up-and-coming actors by European Film Promotion, at the Berlin International Film Festival 2010.

Baasmo Christiansen voiced Hans in the Norwegian dub of the Disney animated film Frozen and played Herman Watzinger in the 2012 adaptation of Thor Heyerdahl's Kon-Tiki. He also starred in the hit sitcom Dag between 2010 and 2015.

In 2023 he starred in the Norwegian film Konvoi (The Arctic Convoy), playing Captain Skar.
