= Reisen til Julestjernen =

1924 Norwegian play by Sverre Brandt

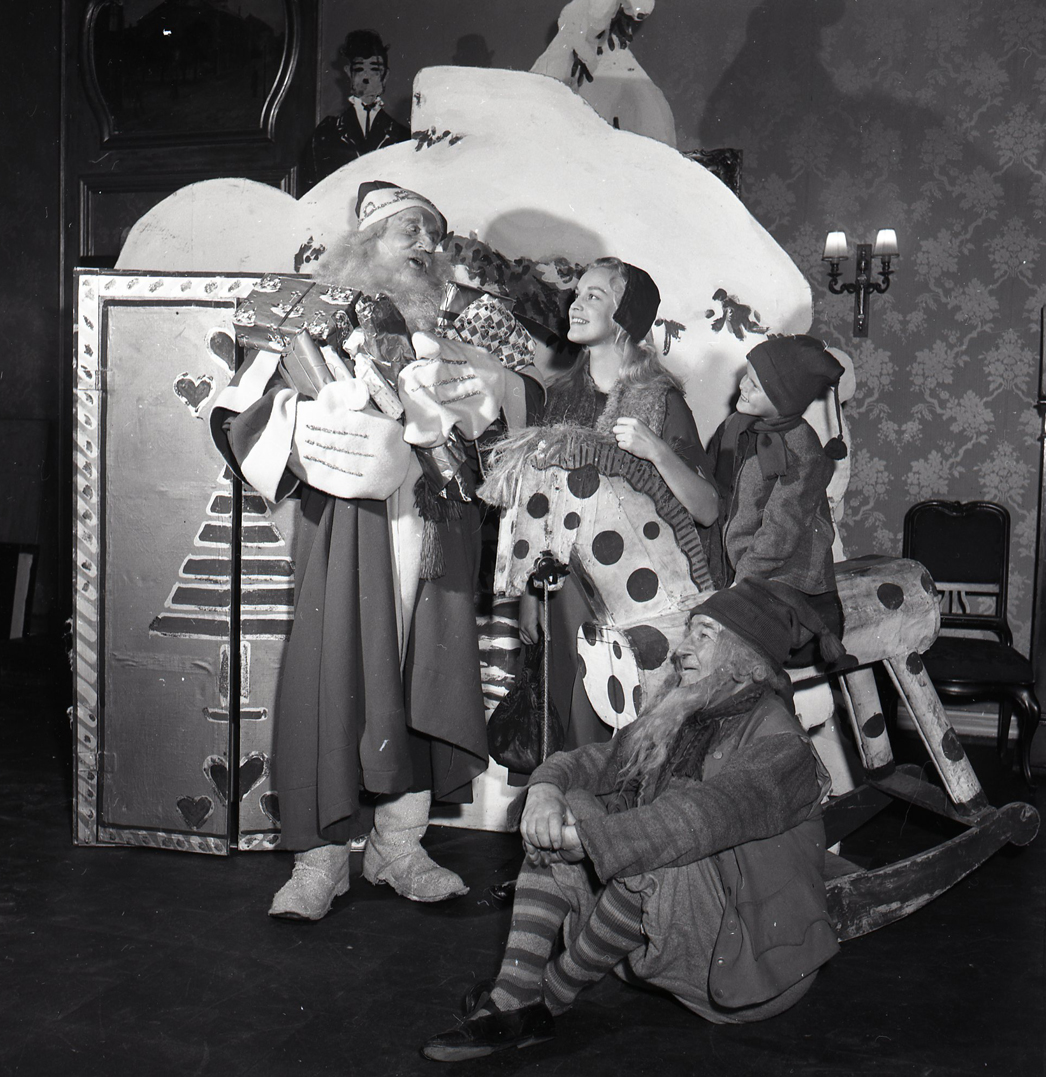
Scene from the National Theatre's performance of Sverre Brandt's Christmas classic Reisen til julestjernen in 1957. The lead role was played by Synnøve Strigen, a Norwegian actress known from films such as Bedre enn sitt rykte and Operasjon Løvsprett.

Reisen til Julestjernen (Journey to the Christmas Star) is a Norwegian play by Sverre Brandt from 1924. It was performed for the first time on Saint Stephen's Day (December 26), 1924.

The play holds the record for the most performances at the National Theatre in Oslo; its 500th performance took place in January 1962. Brandt used the well-known Christmas carol "Silent Night" as a theme for the play. Johan Halvorsen composed the music for the play.

The play has also been performed at many other venues in Norway and abroad.

== Film adaptations ==
Brandt's play was adapted as the film Reisen til julestjernen in 1976. The film was directed by Ola Solum and starred Hanne Krogh, Knut Risan, and Bente Børsum. Another film version was made in 2012, directed by Nils Gaup and starring Vilde Marie Zeiner, Agnes Kittelsen, and Anders Baasmo Christiansen. The film versions of the play have been broadcast by NRK on Christmas Eve since the 1990s.
