= Medbøe =

Medbøe is a surname. Notable people with the surname include:

- Katja Medbøe, Norwegian actress
- Odd Medbøe, Norwegian journalist, public relations officer, and author
- Wenche Medbøe (born 1940), Norwegian actress
