= Einarson =

Einarson is a surname. Notable people with the surname include:

- Eldar Einarson (born 1947), Norwegian filmmaker and writer
- Henry Einarson (1918–1992), Canadian politician
- John Einarson (born 1952), Canadian rock journalist
- Kerri Einarson (born 1987), Canadian curler
- Oddvar Einarson (born 1949), Norwegian movie director

== See also ==
- Einarsson
