= Journey to the Christmas Star =

2012 film

- Norwegian: Reisen til julestjernen
- Directed by: Nils Gaup
- Written by: Kamilla Krogsveen
- Based on: Reisen til Julestjernen by Sverre Brandt
- Produced by: Jan Eirik Langøen; Sigurd Mikal Karoliussen
- Starring: Vilde Marie Zeiner; Agnes Kittelsen; Anders Baasmo Christiansen
- Cinematography: Odd Reinhardt Nicolaysen; Anna Myking
- Edited by: Per Erik Eriksen
- Music by: Johan Halvorsen; Gaute Storaas
- Distributed by: Storm Rosenberg AS
- Release date: November 9, 2012
- Running time: 76 minutes
- Country: Norway
- Language: Norwegian

Journey to the Christmas Star (Norwegian: Reisen til julestjernen) is a Norwegian fairy-tale adventure film from 2012 directed by Nils Gaup. The film is based on Sverre Brandt's 1924 play Reisen til Julestjernen and is otherwise considered a remake of the 1976 film with the same name. The film stars Vilde Marie Zeiner, Agnes Kittelsen, and Anders Baasmo Christiansen.

The film was a box-office success, and was seen by 443,680 people, which made it the fifth-most-viewed film in Norwegian cinemas in 2012 (after The Hobbit: An Unexpected Journey and ahead of The Dark Knight Rises). The film was rated four stars by Dagbladet, Verdens Gang, Dagsavisen, and FilmMagasinet, and three stars by Aftenposten.

== Cast ==
- Vilde Marie Zeiner as Sonja
- Agnes Kittelsen as Melssahya the witch
- Stig-Werner Moe as Count Uldrich
- Anders Baasmo Christiansen as the king
- Jakob Oftebro as Ole
- Evy Kasseth Røsten as Petrine
- Eilif Hellum Noraker as Mose
- Andreas Cappelen as Santa Claus
- Kristin Zachariassen as Mrs. Claus
- Knut Walle as Father Christmas
- Sofie Asplin as Kristen, the witch's daughter
- Jarl Goli as the astrologer
- Vera Rudi as the robber girl
