= Sigrid Huun =

Norwegian actress (born 1952)

- Born: July 25, 1952 (age 72)
- Occupation: Actress

Sigrid Huun (born July 25, 1952) is a Norwegian actress. She made her film debut in Himmel og helvete in 1969. Among her television performances, she is remembered for having performed in the comedy series Egentlig on NRK in the 1990s. She also works as a psychologist.

== Filmography ==
- 1969: Himmel og helvete as Eva Falck
- 1979: Kjærleikens ferjereiser as Marianne Kretsen
- 1979: Lucie as Henny
- 1980: Nedtur as Elin
- 1981: Martin as the charmer's girl
- 1981: Sølvmunn as Tove
- 1986: Mama Tumaini
- 1986: X
- 1987: Is-slottet as the mother
- 1990: Gränslots as Torunn
- 1999: Suffløsen as Helen
- 2008: Ulvenatten as Silje Gran
- 2021: HAN as Eirik's mother
