= Nedtur =

- Directed by: Hans Lindgren
- Written by: Hans Lindgren
- Produced by: Laila Mikkelsen; Harald Ohrvik
- Starring: Nils Sletta; Sigrid Huun; Helge Jordal; Frøydis Armand; Anne Marie Ottersen
- Cinematography: Halvor Næss
- Edited by: Ola Solum
- Music by: Christian Reim
- Distributed by: Norsk Film
- Release date: April 25, 1980
- Running time: 90 minutes
- Country: Norway
- Language: Norwegian

Nedtur (literally 'Downturn', released in English as If Music Be the Food of Love) is a Norwegian feature film from 1980 directed by Hans Lindgren. The film is about the life of a musician and his friends who often party together and are struggling with both relationships and marriage.

== Plot ==
Nils (played by Nils Sletta) is a self-absorbed young jazz musician who expresses himself through music. Christian (Helge Jordal), Nils' friend, works as a photographer for a weekly magazine who also takes nude photos to make extra money. Christian is also struggling in his marriage with Kari (Frøydis Armand). Nils and Christian like to party together and drink a lot.

One day, Nils meets the drug addict Elin (Sigrid Huun), and the two become lovers. However, the relationship becomes difficult and they quarrel a lot. When Nils goes on tour one day, he breaks up with Elin, which causes her to break down and start using drugs again. Christian, on the other hand, is thrown out of his home and it dawns on him what kind of life he has led. He ends up having a nervous breakdown.

== Reception ==
The newspaper Aftenposten gave the film a "die throw" of 3, and Verdens Gang gave it a "die throw" of 4.

== Cast ==
- Nils Sletta as Nils, a musician
- Sigrid Huun as Elin
- Helge Jordal as Christian
- Frøydis Armand as Kari
- Per Blom as a young drug addict
- Anne Marie Ottersen as a girl in the studio
- Kerry-Lou Baylis as the pornographic model
- Arne Berg as the fat man
- Øivind Blunckas the middle-aged man
- Sverre Gran as the debt collector
- Per Hagerup as the drunk man
- Sverre Horge as the homeless man
- Anne Marit Jacobsen as a girl in the studio
- Eyolf Soot Kløvig as the journalist
- Lars Andreas Larssen as the editor
- Unni Løwe as Kim
- William Nyrén as Åge
- Gunhild Pedersen as the unknown girl
- Christin Smit as the secretary
- Egil Storeide as the journalist
- Kari Torbjørnsen as the photo model
