= Kosmetikkrevolusjonen =

- Directed by: Eldar Einarson
- Written by: Eldar Einarson
- Produced by: Harald Ohrvik; Lasse Glomm
- Starring: Carsten Byhring; Zienia Merton; Tor Stokke; Lars Andreas Larssen
- Cinematography: Erling Thurmann-Andersen
- Edited by: Ola Solum
- Music by: Øystein Sunde; Alf Cranner; Frode Thingnæs
- Distributed by: Norsk Film
- Release date: September 30, 1977
- Running time: 80 minutes
- Country: Norway
- Language: Norwegian

Kosmetikkrevolusjonen (The Cosmetics Revolution) is a Norwegian satirical comedy film from 1977 directed by Eldar Einarson, who also wrote the screenplay. The film stars Carsten Byhring, Zienia Merton, Tor Stokke, and Lars Andreas Larssen.

== Plot ==
The film opens in a small test cinema, where the management of the company A/S Clinox sees the company's latest advertising push for the red condom named Ding Dong. Everyone is excited, and they believe that this will really be a big bestseller. However, the next day, the optimism disappears. The consumer ombudsman bans the new condom. It is an election year, and the authorities are afraid the color may be offensive.

At the same time, a mysterious woman named Lucy Ferner is on her way to Oslo. She represents the Hong Kong group A. Rihmann & Co. The company has long been looking for a country where they can expand their energy-intensive cosmetics industry. The choice falls on A/S Clinox. The company's boss, director Olsen, is easy prey for the flattering Lucy Ferner. She will soon be sent a strange, black box, which will take care of the production. In addition to the power intake, it has three holes marked "out", "in," and "exhaust." The box is fully computer controlled, and by pouring in raw material and inserting a pre-programmed card, you can get the most appealing perfume, the reddest blush, or the most virile-smelling aftershave.

The problem lies in getting hold of raw materials, and here is what the group proclaims in big words: "Our industry represents the final solution to the pollution problem!" The Hong Kong group quickly buys the services of a prominent doctor, who in turn persuades the minister of environmental protection to endorse the company's ideas. Soon the entire government will follow suit. A large new factory is planned, and the state creates a monopoly to obtain the raw material: sewage. However, people gradually begin to grumble, and eventually they consider taking matters into their own hands.

== About the film ==
The film is described as a parody of the 1970s cosmetics hysteria. It addresses many current social issues: the authorities' concessions to the private business community, the development of new workplaces, abuse of the female body in advertising, and the production of totally unnecessary goods.

The film received a mixed reception from both Aftenposten's Øyvind Thorsen and Arbeiderbladet's Bjørn Granum. The former wrote positively that: "What appeals to me most about the film is that Einarson strikes in all directions," but also "The film is a lot like the conference host that feels that the show is failing and that, with faith in the possibilities of persuasion, shouts: 'Now we're having fun with you!'" Arbeiderbladet's reviewer was somewhat more positive and wrote, among other things: "but here comes someone who at least has the right intentions. ... Populism, ecology, socialism—Einarson sneaks in most of it," but also referred to the film as somewhat clumsy. Dagbladet gave the film a "die throw" of 3 in 2001. In 1977, the newspaper's reviewer wrote the following: "We will all be sent home with our hair pulled from this kind satire, which does not affect anyone, least of all unfortunately the cosmetics industry". Cinematheque's Lars Daniel Krutzkoff Jacobsen seems to be the most positive. He wrote the following in 2008: "I have never understood why Eldar Einarson's Kosmetikkrevolusjonen has not become one of the great Norwegian comedy classics. One will be looking for a long time for a fitter and crazier film with anarchist kicks in all directions, greedy capitalists and ardent Marxists included."

== Songs ==
- "Klyster d'amour" (Øystein Sunde), recorded by Øystein Sundes Nattkremorkester, released on the single Polydor 2052 152 in 1977
- "Balladen om Lucy Ferner" (Alf Cranner / Eldar Einarson / Axel Helgeland), recorded by Benny Borg, released on the single Polydor 2052 152 in 1977

== Cast ==
- Carsten Byhring as Olsen
- Zienia Merton as Lucy Ferner
- Ivar Nørve as Daniel Solbakken
- Tor Stokke as Hochstock
- Lars Andreas Larssen as Skyggen
- Bernhard Ramstad as Smith
- Veslemøy Haslund as Furubotten
- Ola Solum as a driver
- Frode Rasmussen as Janson
- Bjørn Floberg as an editor
- Kaare Kroppan as a platoon commander
- Lillian Lydersen as a nurse
- Svein Hovde as a journalist
- Bente Børsum
- Bjarne Andersen
- Vibeke Falk
- Odd Furøy
- Kalle Fürst
- Per Jorsett
- Svein Moen
- Erik Øksnes
- Anne Marie Ottersen
- Ingolf Rogde
