= Martin (1981 film) =

- Directed by: Leidulv Risan
- Written by: Anne Gullbjørg Digranes
- Produced by: Jan Erik Düring; Jan Erik Holst
- Starring: Bjørn Skagestad
- Cinematography: Harald Paalgard
- Edited by: Fred Sassebo
- Music by: Jan Garbarek
- Distributed by: Filmforlaget A/S; Norsk Film
- Release date: February 6, 1981
- Running time: 76 minutes
- Country: Norway
- Language: Norwegian

Martin (The Execution) is a Norwegian drama film from 1981 directed by Leidulv Risan. The screenplay was written by Anne Gullbjørg Digranes, and Bjørn Skagestad starred in the title role.

== Plot ==
Beneath the surface of a small Norwegian town in Western Norway hide completely different forces than peace and tolerance. It all starts with the teacher Martin being accused of being gay. The gossip spreads and also affects his cohabiting friends Kjersti and Sara. In the public eye, these three people are deviants that threaten the image of reality. In the municipal administration, two corrupt officials use the gossip to hide their own dishonesty. Martin is broken by suspicion and direct terror over the course of a few spring days.

== Cast ==
- Bjørn Skagestad as Martin
- Unni Evjen as Kjersti Horn
- Nina Hart as Sara Trioli
- Pia Bragmo as Ellen
- Jon Eikemo as Karlsen
- Terje Frækaland - Thomas
- Sverre Gran as the head of the social welfare board
- Roland Hedlund as the drunken man
- Inger Heldal as Randi Olsen
- Sigrid Huun as the charmer's girl
- Helge Jordal as the charmer
- Kaare Kroppan as a social welfare board member
- Lars Andreas Larssen as the gymnastics teacher
- Rolf Arly Lund as the policeman
- Hallvard Lydvo as the medical intern
- Mona Olsen as Marianne
- Sverre Anker Ousdal as Arne Olsen
- Amalia Palma as Bjørg
- Janne Rygg as Kari
- Morten Sandøy a Magnus
- Anne Semmingsen as Mrs. Hansen
- Kjell Stormoen as the principal
- Erik Strømmen as Ola
- Rudi Sønnevik as Jens
- Liv Thorsen as the waitress
- Geir Kåre Veum as Runar
- Wenche Wefring as Carina
- Kalle Øby as the postman
