= Lasse Glomm =

Norwegian film director and screenwriter (1944–1996)

- Born: September 5, 1944
- Died: October 11, 1996 (aged 52)
- Occupation(s): Film director and screenwriter
- Spouse: Bente Erichsen

Lasse Glomm (September 5, 1944 – October 11, 1996) was a Norwegian film director and screenwriter. He directed eight feature films and wrote the screenplays for seven films. He also produced several films.

== Career ==
Glomm began his career as a film journalist and editorial member of the film magazines Fant and Filmavisa. He became involved in film work in 1972. He was a production assistant and manager on several films, including Joseph Losey's film adaptation of A Doll's House (1973) and Per Blom's Mors hus (1974). Glomm made his directorial debut with Det andre skiftet (1978) and followed up with At dere tør! (1980), both based on books by Espen Haavardsholm. After the children's film Zeppelin (1981) came Svarte fugler (1983), a love story set in the publishing environment, whereas Havlandet (1985) was a historical everyday drama for the Cap of the North. The film had its literary setting in Idar Kristiansen's cycle of novels about the Finnish immigration to Northern Norway in the 1860s. The dystopian film Sweetwater (1988) was based on Knut Faldbakken's two Uår novels.

He was production manager for Vårnatt (1976) and the producer for Is-slottet (1987), both based on books by Tarjei Vesaas. He wrote the screenplays for almost all the films he directed, and also wrote the screenplay for the Oscar-nominated Søndagsengler from 1996, which was his last feature film. In the 1990s, he also worked for television and directed some episodes of the soap opera Offshore (1996). Glomm was the artistic director at Norsk Film from 1984 to 1987. For a period he was also a teacher at Dønski High School.

== Filmography ==
=== Director ===
- 1978: Det andre skiftet
- 1980: At dere tør!
- 1981: Zeppelin
- 1983: Svarte fugler
- 1985: Havlandet
- 1988: Sweetwater
- 1994: Den som graver en grav (TV)

=== Screenwriter ===
- 1975: Streik!
- 1978: Det andre skiftet
- 1980: At dere tør!
- 1983: Svarte fugler
- 1985: Havlandet
- 1988: Sweetwater
- 1996: Søndagsengler

=== Producer ===
- 1973: A Doll's House
- 1974: Ungen
- 1976: Kjære Maren
- 1976: Vårnatt
- 1977: Kosmetikkrevolusjonen
- 1979: Kvinnene
- 1987: Is-slottet

== Television series (director) ==
- 1995: I de beste familier (1995)
- 1996: Offshore (1996)
