= Lars Andreas Larssen =

Norwegian actor (1935–2014)

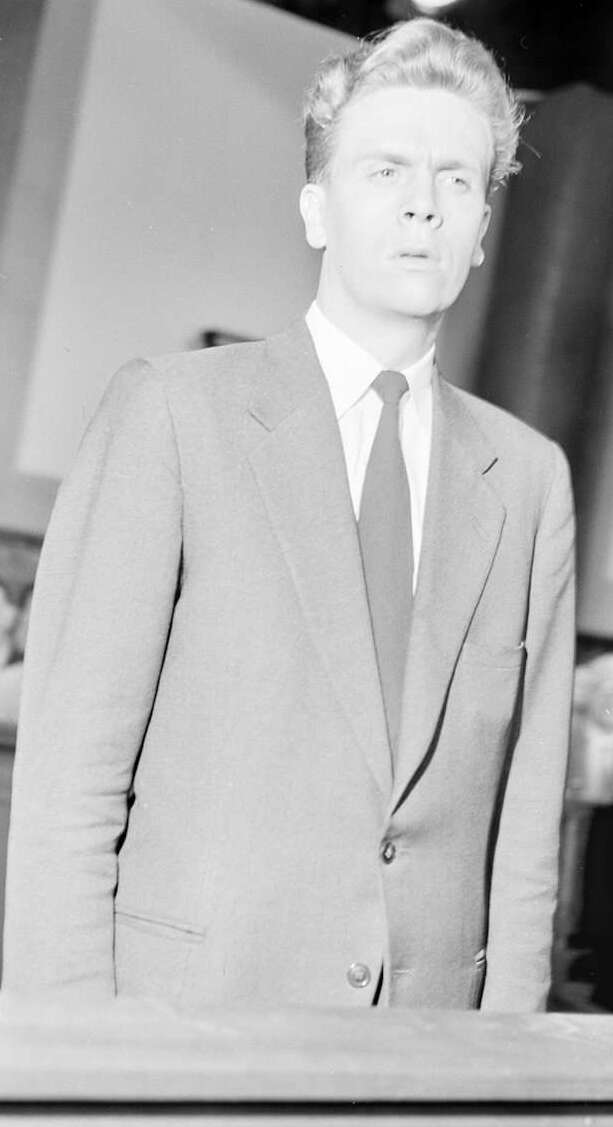
- Born: 27 March 1935; Melbu, Norway
- Died: 29 January 2014 (aged 78); Oslo, Norway
- Occupation: Actor
- Years active: 1957 – 2003
- Spouses: Monna Tandberg (ex-partner); Thrine Naumann (divorced); Sonja Lid (divorced)

Lars Andreas Larssen (27 March 1935 – 29 January 2014) was a Norwegian stage, film and television actor.

== Career ==
Larssen was born in the village of Melbu in Hadsel Municipality in Norway. His debut came in 1957, playing a minor role in the blockbuster Nine Lives. He had a larger role in the 1959 film The Master and His Servants, but soon realized that he belonged in the theatre. He began his stage career in 1958 at Folketeatret (The People's Theatre) in Oslo, and went on to become a key figure in establishing the Torshovteatret (Theatre Torshov) as a modern stage theater in the late-1970s. Whilst performing on stage, Larssen also continued to have small roles in films, most notably in the 1983 film Pirates. His best-known television work was as a school principal in the 1989 Norwegian series "Borgen skole", and as Karls former boss, Gundersen, in the first season of Mot i brøstet in 1993. He also played the role of "wise man" in Norway's mid-1990s version of Fort Boyard, Fangene på Fortet.

In 2004, Larssen caused a stir in Norwegian media after publicly criticizing the NRK produced comedy show Team Antonsen for their portrayal of rural Northern Norway, which he described as "mean and hateful". He later withdrew his statements after several northern newspapers called it an "overreaction" and rebuffed his criticism, stating that Larssen was "outdated" in his opinions. Following the controversy, Larssen did a guest appearance on the show, in a satirical portrayal of himself. Whilst unknown to the public at the time, Larssen was suffering from Alzheimer's disease, and his statements and subsequent actions have later been attributed to the degenerating effects of the disease. He retired from acting in 2003, and appeared in public for the last time in 2005.

In 1962, he and his wife, writer and actress Sonja Lid, established the Peace Office (Fredskontoret) in Stavanger. In the following years peace offices burgeoned in a number of Norwegian cities and towns.

== Personal life and death ==
Larssen was the father of author Vetle Lid Larssen and filmmaker Gaute Lid Larssen, from his first marriage to Sonja Lid. He later married Thrine Naumann and they had a son, Lars Larssen Naumann, rapper and member of Multicyde. Following his second divorce, Larssen lived with actress Monna Tandberg until a few years before his death.

In August 2007, Tandberg publicly announced that Larssen had been diagnosed with Alzheimer's disease in 2003. Larssen had been struggling to remember his lines in a play, despite performing it several times before, which led him to drop out of the play. She sought to bring public awareness to the disease with this announcement. The illness forced Larssen to retire from acting, and two years later, he stopped appearing in public altogether.

Larssen died in his sleep from Alzheimer's disease on 29 January 2014 at an Oslo nursing home, aged 78.

== Partial filmography ==
- Nine Lives (1957) - Amund, kjelketrekker
- The Master and His Servants (1959) - Leif Helmer
- Douglas (1970)
- Døden i gatene (1970)
- Rødblått paradis (1971) - Fenriken
- Lukket avdeling (1972)
- Kanarifuglen (1973) - Jenssen
- Brannen (1973) - Bærer #2
- Anton (1973) - Wikipedia
- Bortreist på ubestemt tid (1974)
- Faneflukt (1975)
- Kosmetikkrevolusjonen (1977) - Skyggen
- The Carriage Stone (1977) - Læreren
- Desperadosklubben og den mystiske mistenkte (1978) - Reidar, Ottos far
- Pøbel (1978)
- Operasjon Cobra (1978) - Sivil politi på bru 1
- Blood of the Railroad Workers (1979) - Jensa-Jens
- Ingen roser... takk (1979) - Lars
- Kjærleikens ferjereiser (1979)
- Nedtur (1980) - Redaktøren
- The Reward (1980) - Terje
- Martin (1981) - Gymnastikklæreren
- The Witch Hunt (1981) - Glaser
- Sølvmunn (1981) - Mann på fly
- Piratene (1983) - Ordfører
- The Chieftain (1984) - Takstmann
- Noe helt annet (1985) - Forsvarer
- Nattseilere (1986) - Læreren
- The Last Lieutenant (1993) - Bjelland
- Zero Kelvin (1995) - Judge
- Olsenbandens siste stikk (1999) - Politimester
