= Martin Musto =

British theatre practitioner

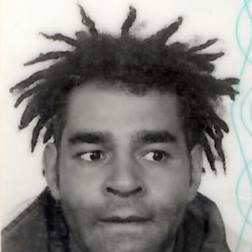
- Martin Musto, 2000
- Born: Grangetown, North Yorkshire, United Kingdom

Martin Musto is a British-born theatre practitioner based in Oslo, Norway.

His work for one of Oslo's National Theatres (Det Norske Teatret) includes, Rainer Werner Fassbinder's play, Fear Eats The Soul, Ivar Lindberg's production of Tusen år og like blid and the televised production of The triumph of Love. In the mid 90s he worked for the Norwegian national film company, Norsk Film, as Construction Manager, on films such as The Sunset Boys, starring Robert Mitchum and Cliff Roberson and Zero Kelvin. In 2008, Musto collaborated with the Norwegian Arts Council and international artists, Jacques Lasalle and Silvio Pukarete to create new drama as well as seminars for the 2008 Nordic Showcase In 2008 Musto directed the Scandinavian premiere of the Joe Penhall play Blue Orange with Isaka Sawadogo playing the lead role and in 2014, he travelled to Soweto in South Africa as Production Designer for the Soweto Theatre's adaptation of Arthur Schnitzler's La Ronde, retitled to Are You Dik?

== Personal life ==
His father, John Musto died in 2013, at the age of 81 in Grangetown. Martin has one sister, Margret.

== Credits ==
Martin Musto's Theatre and Film Credits to date:
Year	Title	Role	Theatre Company	Writer	Director
1982	Klovner og Engler	Actor	Teater Beljash	Aristofanes (En satirisk Commedia dell'arte-inspirert produksjon)	Tim Dalton
1982	They Shoot Horses, Don't They?	Actor	Det Norske Teatret	Horace McCoy	Trond Lie
1993	Tobakkens skadelege verknader	Stage Design	Det Norske Teatret	Anton Chekhov	Harry Guttormsen
1993	Cyrano de Bergerac	Stage Design	Det Norske Teatret	Edmond Rostand	Kjetil Bang-Hansen
1995	The Sunset Boys	Construction Manager	Norsk Film	Arthur Johansen, Leidulv Risan	Leidulv Risan
1996	Ein sørgjeleg time	Technical Director	Det Norske Teatret	Bjørn Endreson og Tom Tellefsen	Bjørn Endreson og Tom Tellefsen
1996	Someone is Going to Come	Technical Director	Det Norske Teatret	Jon Fosse	Otto Homlung
1998	Tusen år og like blid	Stage Design	Det Norske Teatret	Are Kalvø og Ragnar Hovland med tekster av Are Kalvø, Ragnar Hovland, Knut Nærum, Per Kristiansen og Ingrid Jørgensen	Ivar Tindberg
1998	Kjærleikens triumf	Stage Design	Det Norske Teatret	Pierre Charlet de Chamblain de Marivaux	Olof Lindqvist
2001	Tandem	Stage Design	Det Norske Teatret	Issak Esmail Issak	Issak Esmail Issak
2004	Fear Eats the Soul	Producer	Det Norske Teatret	Rainer Werner Fassbinder	
2008	Blue Orange	Director	Home Theatre	Joe Penhall	Martin Musto
2014	Are You Dik?	Designer	Soweto Theatre	Arthur Schnitzler	Robert Coleman
