= Sweetwater (1988 film) =

- Directed by: Lasse Glomm
- Written by: Lasse Glomm; Petter Skavlan
- Based on: Knut Faldbakken's novels Uår. Aftenlandet and Uår. Sweetwater
- Produced by: Bente Erichsen
- Starring: Bentein Baardson; Petronella Barker; Per Jansen; Sverre Anker Ousdal; Bjørn Sundquist; Elsa Lystad
- Cinematography: Philip Øgaard
- Edited by: Peter Ekvall; Mats Krüger
- Music by: Stefan Nilsson
- Distributed by: Marcusfilm A/S
- Release date: September 14, 1988
- Running time: 115 minutes
- Country: Norway
- Language: Norwegian

Sweetwater is a 1988 Norwegian science-fiction thriller film directed by Lasse Glomm. It is about the struggle to survive in an anarchic vision of the future, and it is based on the novels Uår. Aftenlandet and Uår. Sweetwater by Knut Faldbakken. The books were published in 1974 and 1976. Sweetwater was filmed at locations in Rome and London. The film has been aired on NRK several times.

== Plot ==
The action takes place in an eerie anarchistic future civilization, after a great collapse or war. A young man, Allan (Bentein Baardson), decides to move out of the town where his family lives. He takes his wife, Lisa (Petronella Barker), and his son to a large garbage dump outside the town. There they settle down and survive on the waste they find at the landfill. In many ways, they become closer to each other by living this way, and Lisa eventually becomes pregnant. However, there is a severe shortage of water, and the family of three must go out and look for water. Then they discover that they are not alone living in the landfill. There is a struggle for life.

== Location ==
The film was shot in 1987 at the Malagrotta landfill outside Rome and in the derelict London Docklands. At Malagrotta there were huge amounts of trash; it was very hot and the smell there was very oppressive. In the London Docklands, the area at the time consisted of many unfinished apartment buildings and houses ready for demolition. These settings created the sad and depressing impression of the urban civilization of the future that the film sought to portray.

== Cast ==
- Bentein Baardson as Allan
- Petronella Barker as Lisa, Allan's wife
- Martin Disch as Allan and Lisa's son
- Alphonsia Emmanuel as Mary Diamond
- Per Jansen as Smiley
- Sven Wollter as Doc
- Sverre Anker Ousdal as Run-Run
- Bjørn Sundquist as Felix
- Tom Tellefsen as Janson
- Elsa Lystad as Marta
- Morten Faldaas as Roy Indiana
- Terje Strømdahl as Sweetness
- Lars Arentz-Hansen as the terrorist

== Reception ==
The film received mixed reviews. Many thought the film was too monotonous and empty, and that it had little character development. Aftenposten and Verdens Gang gave it a "die throw" of 3, and Dagsavisen gave it a die throw of 4.
