= Carl Gustav, gjengen og parkeringsbandittene =

- Directed by: Ola Solum
- Written by: Jan Lindvik; Inge Tenvik
- Starring: Frank Arne Johansen; Merete Andersen; Kjetil Bøe; Marius Hansteen; Jarle Rosenlund; Marianne Øversveen
- Release date: 26 August 1982
- Running time: 79 minutes
- Country: Norway
- Language: Norwegian

Carl Gustav, gjengen og parkeringsbandittene (Carl Gustav, the Gang and the Parking Bandits) is a Norwegian children's mystery film from 1982.

== Plot ==
It is about 12-year-old Carl Gustav and his friends, who one day discover a playground has been converted to a parking lot. Several other playgrounds in suburban Bergen disappear. The film was directed by Ola Solum and featured Frank Arne Johansen in the lead role. The film was produced by Norsk Film and given a seven-year rating.

== Receptions ==
The film received good reviews from Aftenposten and Arbeiderbladet. It received criticism for using too much special effects, a long title and a thin plot, but was appeased for Solum's good work as a director and the good use of children in the main roles.
