= Zeiner =

Zeiner is a surname. Notable people with the surname include:

- Gerald Zeiner (born 1988), Austrian handball player
- Herman Fredrik Zeiner-Gundersen (1915–2002), general in the Norwegian Army
- Dick Zeiner-Henriksen (1924–2016), Norwegian businessperson
- Vilde Marie Zeiner (born 1999), Norwegian actress
