= Eilif Armand =

Norwegian actor

- Born: 18 March 1921; Bergen, Norway
- Died: 28 November 1993 (aged 72); Bergen
- Occupation: Actor
- Children: Frøydis Armand; Gisken Armand; Merete Armand

Eilif Armand (18 March 1921 – 28 November 1993) was a Norwegian actor.

He was born in Bergen to businessman Sverre Andreassen and Maggi Sørensen, and was the father of actresses Frøydis Armand, Gisken Armand and Merete Armand. He made his stage debut at Den Nationale Scene in 1946, as "Jesus" in Nordahl Grieg's play Barabbas. He was assigned with Den Nationale Scene from 1948 to 1956, with Rogaland Teater from 1956 to 1958, with Nationaltheatret from 1958 to 1975, and again with Den Nationale Scene from 1975. His film appearances included Marikens bryllup (1972) and Kjærleikens ferjereiser (1979). He published the poetry collection Ingen blir klok av skade in 1951, and contributed as literary critic for the newspapers Friheten and Bergens Tidende.
