= Reisen til julestjernen (1976 film) =

1976 film

- Directed by: Ola Solum
- Written by: Ola Solum; Axel Helgeland
- Based on: Reisen til Julestjernen by Sverre Brandt
- Starring: Knut Risan; Bente Børsum; Hanne Krogh; Harald Heide-Steen Jr.
- Cinematography: Hans Nord
- Edited by: Edith Toreg
- Music by: Johan Halvorsen
- Distributed by: Norsk Film
- Release date: December 3, 1976
- Running time: 92 minutes
- Country: Norway
- Language: Norwegian

Reisen til julestjernen (Journey to the Christmas Star) is a 1976 Norwegian fairy-tale adventure film directed by Ola Solum and starring Hanne Krogh, Knut Risan, and Bente Børsum. The film was the solo feature-film directing début by Ola Solum. It is regularly broadcast by NRK every Christmas Eve.

A remake of the film, directed by Nils Gaup, was released in 2012.

== Plot ==
The film opens in a small kingdom, a place in Wonderland. A castle with towers and spires stands over a small medieval village, surrounded by thick walls. The castle is home to the little royal family—the king, the queen, and their little daughter, Princess Gulltopp ('Golden Hair')—with their court. Around her neck, Gulltopp carries a beautiful golden heart she received from her mother, the queen. Then one night Gulltopp disappears from the castle, on Christmas Eve. She has gone out into the woods all alone to find the Christmas star that she desires with all her heart. Her uncle, the vain and power-hungry count, has tricked her into doing so.

When the king and queen learn that the princess has disappeared, they are sad. The queen runs desperately out into the woods to look for her. The king curses the Christmas star, which he blames for his misfortune. But the king's curse causes the Christmas star to go out, and with it the queen disappears. Grief descends over the land. A traveling entourage of jugglers finds Gulltopp freezing and abandoned out in the woods. They do not know that this girl child is the missing princess, and they take her with them.

Many years later, the same traveling group of jugglers return to the castle. It is Christmas Eve again, and in the entourage is also Sonja (i.e., Gulltopp), who has become a beautiful young girl. When Sonja hears about the king's grief, she offers to find the Christmas star for the king, so that he can get his wife and daughter back. The sages have predicted that, if the star begins to shine again, then the princess and the queen will also return. Sonja goes out into the woods to find the Christmas star. However, the count follows her. Out in the woods, she meets an old woman selling Christmas sheaves (Norwegian: julenek). She is the queen, who has been transformed into an old woman. The old woman sees the golden heart that Sonja wears around her neck and understands that this is Princess Gulltopp. Sonja, pursued by the count, is helped by the woman and escapes Ulrich. But Count Ulrich catches up with her again. Then she is saved by little elves, who lead her to Santa's workshop. Santa says she will have her wish fulfilled, and Sonja wants the Christmas star to shine over the land again.

The wish comes true, but, as Sonja happily runs into the castle to say that the star has returned, she is seized by Ulrich's men and thrown into the castle's darkest dungeon. The old woman comes to the rescue by extracting the keys to the dungeon from the guard and leads Sonja to the king. She proves that Sonja is his daughter by presenting the necklace with the golden heart. When the king is reunited with his daughter and sees that the Christmas star has returned, there is great joy in the castle and in the country. Ulrich is captured and the old woman disappears. When the princess wants to thank the old woman later that evening, she reappears. After Sonja embraces her, the woman is transformed into the beautiful queen again, and the little royal family is reunited.

== Production and reception ==
The film is based on Sverre Brandt's play with the same title from 1924, and it was the first Norwegian adventure film in feature film format. With a budget of almost NOK three million, at the time of its premiere this was one of the most expensive Norwegian films ever produced.

Reisen til julestjernen was shot in the winter of 1976 at various locations including: Akershus Fortress, the Norwegian Museum of Cultural History, Norefjell mountain, Savalen lake in Tynset Municipality, Røros Municipality, and Nannestad Municipality. There was no snow that winter, and the film on the verge of being canceled. Truckload after truckload of snow had to be driven to Akershus Fortress. Egil Monn-Iversen wrote several new songs for this film, including "Sonjas sang til julestjernen" (Sonja's Song to the Christmas Star) with lyrics by Axel Helgeland. The textile artist and costume designer Kari Elfstedt was in charge of the costumes.

The film premiered at the Klingenberg cinema in Oslo on December 3, 1976, and Princess Märtha Louise was the guest of honor in the theater. About 75 copies of the film were produced, more than ten times as many as normal for a Norwegian film at the time. Hanne Krogh, who was 19 years old at the time, had her debut in film with the role of Sonja. Harald Heide-Steen Jr., who played the fool in the film, was typecast in this role and unable to perform other characters for years.

The newspapers Aftenposten, Verdens Gang, Dagbladet, and Dagsavisen rated the film four stars.

When the film celebrated its 25th anniversary in 2001, it was relaunched with new sound effects, refreshed colors and contrasts, new opening and closing credits, new digital image effects, and a new stereo mix. On December 11, 2009, it was also released on DVD.

The film was traditionally shown every Christmas Eve in a joint broadcast on NRK1 and NRK Super. In recent years, only NRK1 has shown the film from 1976, whereas NRK Super shows the remake from 2012. Watching the film is now a tradition for many Norwegians on Christmas Eve morning.

== Cast ==
- Ingrid Larsen as Princess Gulltopp as a child
- Hanne Krogh as Princess Gulltopp / Sonja
- Knut Risan as the king
- Bente Børsum as the queen / the old woman
- Alf Nordvang as the count
- Harald Heide-Steen Jr. as the fool
- Anne Marit Jacobsen as Petrine
- Knut Walle as Ole
- Marit Syversen as Columbine
- Rolf Just Nilsen as a harlequin
- Bjarne Andersen as the astrologer
- Willie Hoel as a sage
- Johannes Eckhoff as a sage
- Rune Ek as a sage
- Julian Strøm as Santa

== See also ==
- List of Christmas films
