= Insomnia (1997 film) =

1997 film by Erik Skjoldbjærg

- Theatrical release poster
- Directed by: Erik Skjoldbjærg
- Written by: Nikolaj Frobenius; Erik Skjoldbjærg
- Produced by: Tomas Backstrom; Petter Borgli; Tom Remlov
- Starring: Stellan Skarsgård; Sverre Anker Ousdal; Bjørn Floberg; Gisken Armand; Maria Bonnevie
- Cinematography: Erling Thurmann-Andersen
- Edited by: Hakon Overas
- Music by: Geir Jenssen
- Distributed by: Norsk Film
- Release dates: 14 March 1997 (Norway); 1 February 1998 (Sweden)
- Running time: 96 minutes
- Countries: Norway; Sweden
- Languages: Norwegian; Swedish

Insomnia is a 1997 Norwegian neo-noir thriller film directed by Erik Skjoldbjærg, who co-wrote it with Nikolaj Frobenius. The film follows a police detective investigating a murder in a town located above the Arctic Circle. The investigation goes horribly wrong when he mistakenly shoots his partner and subsequently attempts to cover it up. The title of the film refers to his inability to sleep, the result of his guilt, represented by the relentless glare of the midnight sun.

The film inspired the 2002 American remake Insomnia.

== Plot ==
When 17-year-old Tanja Lorentzen is found murdered in the city of Tromsø, far up in the Norwegian Arctic, Kripos police officers Jonas Engström (Stellan Skarsgård) and Erik Vik (Sverre Anker Ousdal) are called in to investigate. Engström, formerly with the Swedish police, moved to Norway after being caught having sex with the main witness in one of his cases. Vik is nearing retirement age, and his memory is failing.

Engström devises a plan to lure the murderer back to the scene of the crime, but the stakeout is blown and the suspect flees into the fog, shooting one of the Norwegian police officers in the leg. Unbeknownst to his unarmed colleagues, Engström carries a gun from his days in the Swedish police, who routinely carry firearms. Firing at what he believes to be the suspect, Engstrom accidentally kills Vik, who had mistakenly run right instead of left as ordered.

Realizing that everyone assumes Vik was shot by the fugitive, Engström decides not to admit his culpability. When one of his colleagues, Hilde Hagen (Gisken Armand), is assigned to investigate Vik's death, Engström becomes worried about ballistic fingerprinting and tampers with evidence to support his story. Haunted by guilt and unable to sleep with the midnight sun of the Arctic, Engström becomes increasingly unhinged and starts hallucinating about Vik.

Engström learns from one of Tanja's friends that she had been seeing Jon Holt (Bjørn Floberg), a crime novelist. He correctly deduces that Holt killed Tanja, but Holt reveals that he saw Engström shoot Vik. The two decide to frame Tanja's boyfriend Eilert for her murder, with Engström later planting Holt's gun under Eilert's bed and Holt giving testimony about Eilert being abusive. However, Hagen is not convinced, and when new evidence emerges, Engström knows that it is only a matter of time until Holt is arrested.

Engström tracks Holt to some waterfront properties that are slowly collapsing into the sea. Holt suspects that Engström has come to kill him and holds him at gunpoint, explaining how he killed Tanja in a fit of rage when she rejected his advances. Holt tries to flee across a pier, but the rotten floorboards give way and he falls into the water below, striking his head on the way down. He drowns as Engström watches. When Engström searches Holt's nearby house, he finds Tanja's dress, which Holt had removed before dumping the body. With Holt dead, and definitive proof he was the murderer, the case is closed.

Just before he leaves town, Engström is visited by Hagen, who shows him a cartridge case found at the site where Vik was shot. She notes it is a Norma, which Engström confirms is a brand used by the Swedish police. Engström expects Hagen to arrest him, but instead she simply places the cartridge on a table and leaves. Engström drives out of town, his face and eyes showing great weariness, and he seems not to have recovered from his insomnia.

== Cast ==
- Stellan Skarsgård as Jonas Engström
- Sverre Anker Ousdal as Erik Vik
- Bjørn Floberg as Jon Holt
- Gisken Armand as Hilde Hagen
- Maria Bonnevie as Ane
- Bjørn Moan as Eilert
- Maria Mathiesen as Tanja Lorentzen
- Marianne O. Ulrichsen as Frøya
- Kristian Figenschow as Arne Zakariassen
- Thor Michael Aamodt as Tom Engen
- Frode Rasmussen as Chief of Police

== Critical reception ==
The film has been widely praised as a psychological study and work of neo-noir. Roger Ebert of the Chicago Sun-Times compared it to Fyodor Dostoyevsky's novel Crime and Punishment. For the New York Times, Janet Maslin praised the principal performance by Skarsgård and added that "Mr. Skjoldbjærg's understated, elliptical direction keeps the material dangerous and volatile, with frequent small touches of the unexpected as Engstrom shows increasing signs of strain."

On Rotten Tomatoes the film has a 95% rating based on reviews from 44 critics. The site's consensus states that: "taut and chilly, Insomnia is a solid showcase for Stellan Skarsgård's estimable acting, and a brilliant debut for director Erik Skjoldbjærg."

== Remake ==
A remake of the film was directed by Christopher Nolan. The film, featuring Al Pacino, Robin Williams, and Hilary Swank, was released in 2002.
