= Merete Armand =

Norwegian actress

- Born: 8 June 1955; Bergen, Norway
- Died: 22 January 2017 (aged 61); Norway
- Education: Norwegian National Academy of Theatre
- Occupation: Actress
- Parent: Eilif Armand (father)
- Relatives: Frøydis Armand (sister); Gisken Armand (sister)
- Awards: Pernillestatuetten

Merete Armand (8 June 1955 – 22 January 2017) was a Norwegian actress.

== Biography ==
She was born in Bergen, a daughter of actor Eilif Armand, and sister of actors Gisken Armand and Frøydis Armand. She was educated at the Norwegian National Academy of Theatre. She was assigned with the theatres Sogn og Fjordane Teater, Telemark Teater, Trøndelag Teater, Riksteatret and Den Nationale Scene. She was awarded Pernillestatuetten in 1997.
