= Dangerous Waters =

Dangerous Waters may refer to:

- Dangerous Waters (video game)
- Dangerous Waters (1936 film), American film
- Dangerous Waters (1995 film), Norwegian film
- Dangerous Waters (2023 film), American film
