= Jack Fjeldstad =

Norwegian actor and stage producer

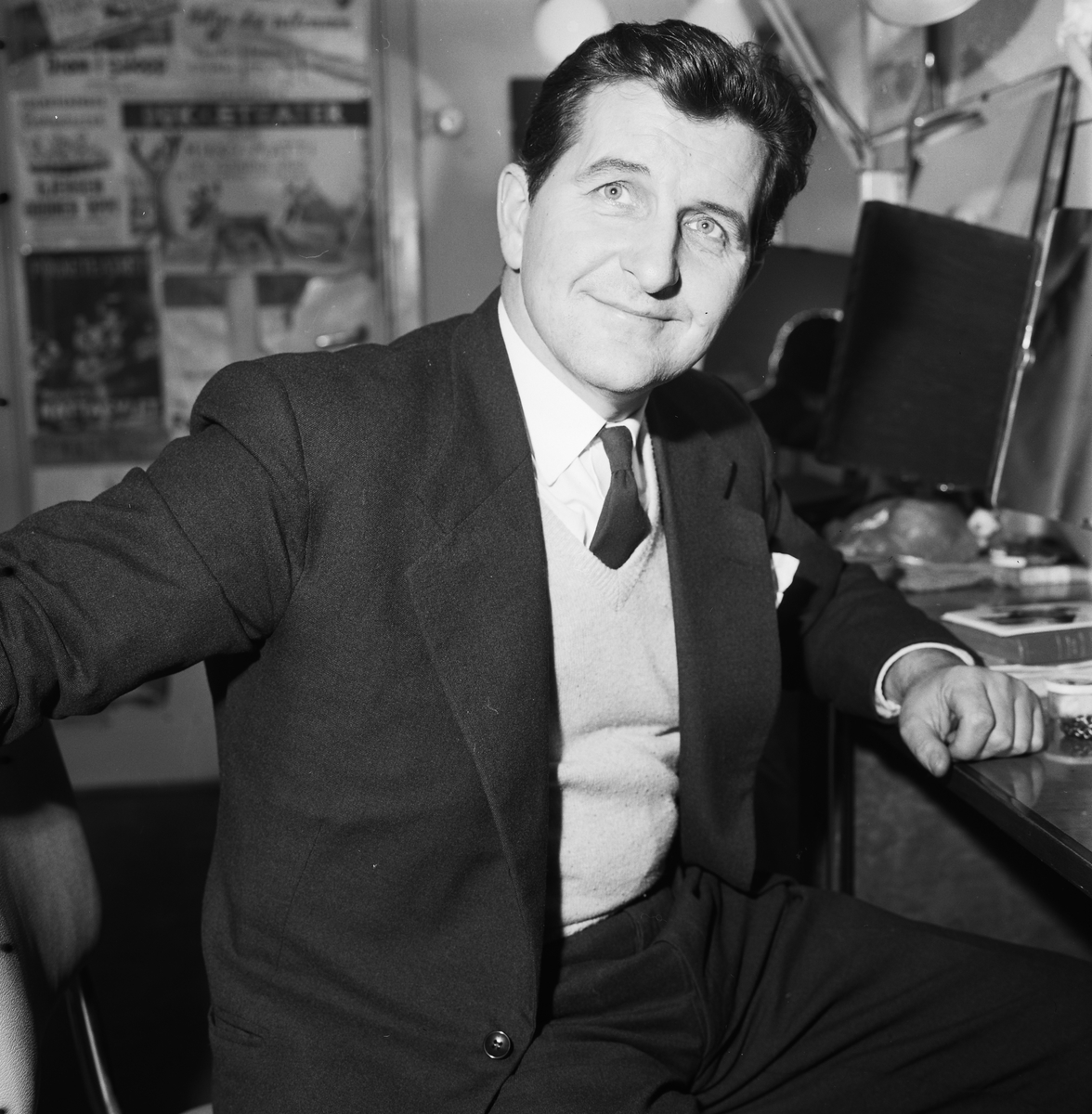
- Jack Fjeldstad in 1958
- Born: 24 March 1915; Kristiania, Norway
- Died: 4 September 2000 (aged 85)
- Occupations: Actor and stage producer
- Awards: Order of St. Olav (1985); Amanda Honorary Award (1987)

Jack Fjeldstad (24 March 1915 – 4 September 2000) was a Norwegian actor and stage producer. He was active on stage and in films for more than fifty years.

== Biography ==
Fjeldstad was born in Kristiania on 24 March 1915. His parents were Gunvald Fjeldstad and Gunvor Gundersen, and he grew up with his grandparents at Lilleaker. He was married to secretary Inger Sofie Berg.

He made his film debut in Jeg er ung in 1934. He played in the narrative film Det drønner gjennom dalen in 1937, and participated in more than thirty films, including the role of Jan Baalsrud in Nine Lives from 1957.

He was decorated Knight, First Class of the Royal Norwegian Order of St. Olav in 1985. In 1987 he received the Amanda Honorary Award.

== Filmography ==
| Year | Title | Role | Notes |
|---|---|---|---|
| 1938 | Det drønner gjennom dalen | Streikebryter | |
| 1938 | Lenkene brytes | Jan Heien | |
| 1939 | Gryr i Norden | Krestian | |
| 1941 | The Sausage-Maker Who Disappeared | Kelner | |
| 1942 | Jeg drepte! | Bagge, doktor | |
| 1946 | Så møtes vi imorgen | Politibetjenten | |
| 1946 | Vi vil leve | | |
| 1949 | Boys from the Streets | Styggen | |
| 1951 | Vi gifter oss | En slagerkomponist | |
| 1951 | Alt dette og Island med | En mann | |
| 1952 | Nødlanding | Tormod, sykebilsjåføren | |
| 1952 | Andrine og Kjell | | |
| 1952 | Det kunne vært deg | Bileieren | |
| 1953 | Selkvinnen | Hannes Klasor | |
| 1954 | Slik kan det gjøres. Husmorfilmen 1954 | | |
| 1955 | Trost i taklampa | Brekkestøl | |
| 1955 | Hjem går vi ikke | Eier av verkstedet | |
| 1955 | Savnet siden mandag | | |
| 1956 | Kvinnens plass | the insurance agent | |
| 1957 | Nine lives | Jan Baalsrud | |
| 1957 | Hjemme hos oss. Husmorfilmen 1957. | | |
| 1961 | Det store varpet | | |
| 1965 | Lianbron | Eigil Thomsen | |
| 1966 | Skrift i sne | Journalisten | |
| 1968 | Bare et liv - historien om Fridtjof Nansen | Otto Sverdrup | |
| 1970 | Love Is War | | |
| 1970 | Ballad of the Masterthief Ole Hoiland | En bonde | |
| 1972 | Marikens bryllup | Leif, Pers far | |
| 1975 | Faneflukt | Bonde | |
| 1979 | Arven | Sam Pettersen | |
| 1987 | Over grensen | Länsmann | |
| 1987 | Etter Rubicon | Thorvald Hoff | |
| 1988 | Blücher | Olaf Bøe | |
| 1989 | Kamilla and the Thief II | Herr Ording | |
| 1989 | En håndfull tid | Farmer | |
| 1991 | For dagene er onde | Gammel-Anders | |
| 1991 | The Polar Bear King | King of the Winterland | |
