= Operasjon Cobra =

- Directed by: Ola Solum
- Written by: Ola Solum
- Based on: The novel Operation Cobra by Anders Bodelsen
- Produced by: Odd Ween
- Starring: Anders Mordal; Wenche Medbøe; Ingrid Larsen; Roy Bjørnstad; Nils Ole Oftebro
- Cinematography: Hans Nord
- Edited by: Edith Toreg
- Music by: Pete Knutsen
- Distributed by: Norsk Film
- Release date: September 22, 1978
- Running time: 91 minutes
- Country: Norway
- Language: Norwegian

Operasjon Cobra (Operation Cobra) is a Norwegian thriller film from 1978 directed by Ola Solum. The film is about a Norwegian family living in Fornebu who are held captive in their own home by terrorists. The goal is to have a base near where the US secretary of state will pass during his visit to Norway. The film stars Anders Mordal, Wenche Medbøe, Ingrid Larsen, Roy Bjørnstad and Nils Ole Oftebro. The film is based on the novel Operation Cobra by the Danish writer Anders Bodelsen.

A Danish version of the film was released in 1995.

== Plot ==
The US secretary of state will pay an official visit to Oslo. At the meeting, the Middle East conflict will be discussed, among other matters. The Norwegian police are on full alert, helicopters are circling over the treetops, and terrorist acts are feared against the secretary. A terrorist group that has planned to kill the secretary of state overpowers an innocent family at Fornebu and uses their house as a base for planning the assassination. The inventive son in the house and his two classmates come up with a clever idea to stop the assassination plans. A rocket system called Cobra plays an important role in the drama.

== Reception ==
About the film, the Norwegian Film Institute wrote: "An exciting film that can delight both twelve-year-olds and experienced film viewers, where the Middle East conflict is inserted into a Norwegian context. It addresses terrorism and violence, and it also tries to provide an explanation."

The newspapers Verdens Gang and Arbeiderbladet gave the film four stars out of six.

== Cast ==
- Anders Mordal as Fredrik
- Ingrid Larsen as Margarethe
- Roy Bjørnstad as Fredrik's father
- Nils Ole Oftebro as Jørgen
- Jo Banoun as Arim's father
- Svein Erik Brodal as Dan's father
- Amina Elazemouri as Hanne
- Noredin Elazemouri as Arim
- Erik Hivju as the teacher
- Jorunn Kjellsby as Arim's mother
- Wenche Medbøe as Fredrik's mother
- Ola Neegaard Jr. as Dan
- Ragnhild Nygaard as Dan's mother
- Liv Thorsen as the police inspector
