= Petronella Barker (actress, born 1965) =

Norwegian actress

- Born: Petronella Barker; 29 October 1965 (age 60); Colchester, England
- Occupation: Actress

Petronella Barker (born 29 October 1965) is a Norwegian actress. Born in Colchester, England, she grew up in Fredrikstad, Norway. While still studying at the Theatre Academy in Oslo (1985–1988), she had her debut in the Soviet-Norwegian co-production Dragens fange (Trees Grow on the Stones Too, 1985). Her breakthrough as a movie actress came with the dystopic Sweetwater (1988), followed by Havet stiger (The Ocean Rises, 1990).

In 1990 she made her stage debut as Perdita in Shakespeare's The Winter's Tale at Centralteatret. Since then she has acted in several plays, also for Oslo Nye Teater and The National Theatre.

Meanwhile she has continued doing roles both for TV and film, most prominently the movie Thranes metode (Thrane's Method, 1998), and the TV police series Fox Grønland (2001).

== Filmography ==
Year	Title	Role	Notes
2013	Victoria		
2006	Codename Hunter	Christine Hoff	TV, 5 episodes
2006	The Bothersome Man	Anne Britt	
2004	Hawaii, Oslo	Bobbie	
2002	Music for Weddings and Funerals	Helen	
2001	Fox Grønland	Lone Pedersen	TV
2000	The Seven Deadly Sins	—	
1998	Thrane's Method	Mol	
1996	Gåten Knut Hamsun	Dagny	
1995	Dangerous Waters	Marlene	
1994	Fatherland	Guide Helga	TV
1993	De Blå ulvene	Rita	
1990	Havet stiger	Susanne	
1988	Sweetwater	Lisa	
1985	Dragens fange	Signy	
