= Faneflukt =

- Directed by: Eldar Einarson
- Written by: Eldar Einarson
- Produced by: Lasse Glomm
- Starring: Aïna Walle; Siemen Rühaak; Frank Straass; Palle Granditsky; Rolf Søder; Knut Husebø; Leif Skarra; Ellen Nikolaysen
- Cinematography: Erling Thurmann-Andersen
- Edited by: Edith Toreg
- Music by: Alf Cranner
- Distributed by: Norsk Film
- Release date: March 13, 1975
- Running time: 97 minutes
- Country: Norway
- Language: Norwegian

Faneflukt (Desertion) is a Norwegian film from 1975. It was directed by Eldar Einarson, who also wrote the screenplay.

== Plot ==
In 1941, the young kitchen maid Liv meets the German non-commissioned officer Franz while she is working in the non-commissioned officer's mess. This is a relationship that their environment, and especially Liv's father, cannot accept, and they decide to flee to Sweden. What Liv does not know is that Franz is already married in Germany.

The film has a different perspective on the German occupation of Norway than Norwegian war films had up until then, and is one of the early examples of an alternative war narrative.

== Cast ==
- Aïna Wallé as Liv
- Siemen Rühaak as Franz
- Frank Straass as Lüllmann
- Palle Granditsky as Boden
- Rolf Søder as a refugee
- Knut Husebø as Walter
- Leif Skarra as Plettenberg
- Tord Peterson as Falck, a rural police superintendent
- Olle Björling som Lieutenant Nilsson
- Ole-Jørgen Nilsen as Lind, a police officer
- Ellen Nikolaysen as a singer
- Jan Nygren as Johansson
- Per-Axel Arosenius as a consultant at the Ministry of Foreign Affairs
- Wilfred Breistrand as a German officer
- Jack Fjeldstad as a farmer
