= For dagene er onde =

1991 Norwegian film directed by Eldar Einarson

- Directed by: Eldar Einarson
- Written by: Eldar Einarson
- Based on: Anne Karin Elstad's novel For dagene er onde
- Produced by: Hilde Berg
- Starring: Anne Krigsvoll; Pål Skjønberg; Bjørn Sundquist; Iren Reppen; Joachim Cossais; Jeppe Beck Laursen
- Cinematography: Wencke Hovet; Bjørn Jegerstedt
- Edited by: Finn Krogvig; Yngve Refseth
- Music by: Geir Bøhren; Bent Åserud
- Distributed by: Norsk Film
- Release date: February 21, 1991
- Running time: 75 minutes
- Country: Norway
- Language: Norwegian

For dagene er onde (For the Days Are Evil) is a Norwegian feature film from 1991 based on the novel of the same name by Anne Karin Elstad. The film is an intense story about the rise of evil and its destruction. It was directed by Eldar Einarson, and it stars Anne Krigsvoll and Pål Skjønberg.

== Plot ==
The Norwegian-American Robert returns to his home village after many years abroad. He develops a close and confidential relationship with 36-year-old Hildegunn, who is married to Tore. Hildegunn is the film's central character. Her warm relationship with Robert soon causes reactions among the villagers, but Hildegunn does not see the destructive tension that is emerging.

== Cast ==
- Anne Krigsvoll as Hildegunn
- Pål Skjønberg as Robert
- Bjørn Sundquist as Tore
- Iren Reppen as Anne
- Joachim Cossais as Anders
- Jeppe Beck Laursen as Knut
- Jack Fjeldstad as Gammel-Anders
- Grete Nordrå as Ane
- Sven Nordin as Hallvard
- Hildegun Riise as Kjersti
- Kaare Kroppan as Ola
- Liv Thorsen as Ragna
- Lars Øyno as Henrik
- Merete Moen as Hilda
- Vidar Sandem as Per
- Anders Kippersund as the parish priest
- Reidar Aarsand as the accordion player
