= A Commuter Kind of Love =

- Directed by: Hans Otto Nicolayssen
- Written by: Hans Otto Nicolayssen
- Starring: Eilif Armand; Frøydis Armand; Per Jansen
- Release date: 1979
- Running time: 97 minutes
- Country: Norway
- Language: Norwegian

A Commuter Kind of Love (Norwegian: Kjærleikens ferjereiser) is a 1979 Norwegian drama film directed by Hans Otto Nicolayssen, starring Eilif Armand, Frøydis Armand and Per Jansen. It takes place on a small island off the coast of north-western Norway, where people deal with such various problems as rural flight, alcohol- and pill abuse, and abortion.
