= Bettina Banoun =

Norwegian barrister

Bettina Banoun (born 1972) is a Norwegian barrister with a doctorate in tax law.

She took the master's degree at Oxford University in 1993, the cand.jur. degree at the University of Oslo in 1995, and the doctorate at the same institution in 2003. She was a research fellow at the University of Oslo from 1997 to 2001, and a visiting scholar at the Harvard Law School in 1997. In 2002 she was hired as a partner in the law firm BA-HR, changing to the law firm Wiersholm in 2004. From 2006 she has admittance to Supreme Court cases. Banoun has specialized in tax law. In the public she became noted, among others, for spearheading a class action suit against Oslo Municipality over the introduction of property tax. She has been a member of the board of the global shipping company Wilh. Wilhelmsen.

Banoun was born in Bærum (rushing to Bærum Hospital) to a Norwegian mother and a father of Moroccan descent. As a teenager she played the main character Flora in the film X (1986), following with a role in Svarte pantere (1992). She is married to Anders Ryssdal, who is a son of Rolv Ryssdal and Signe Marie Stray Ryssdal. They reside in Ullern.
