= The Polar Bear King =

- International release poster
- Directed by: Ola Solum
- Screenplay by: Erik Borge
- Based on: White-Bear-King-Valemon by; Peter Christen Asbjørnsen; Jørgen Moe; East of the Sun and West of the Moon collected by Andrew Lang
- Produced by: Hilde Berg; Erik Borge
- Starring: Jack Fjeldstad; Maria Bonnevie; Tobias Hoesl; Monica Nordquist; Anna-Lotta Larsson
- Cinematography: Philip Øgaard
- Edited by: Yngve Refseth
- Music by: Geir Bøhren; Bent Åserud
- Production companies: Connexion Film; MovieMakers Sweden
- Distributed by: SF Norge
- Release dates: 28 November 1991 (Germany); 12 December 1991 (Norway)
- Running time: 87 minutes
- Countries: Norway; Germany; Sweden
- Language: Norwegian

The Polar Bear King (Norwegian: Kvitebjørn Kong Valemon) is a 1991 fantasy adventure film directed by Ola Solum and starring Jack Fjeldstad, Maria Bonnevie, Tobias Hoesl, Monica Nordquist, and Anna-Lotta Larsson. The film is based on the Norwegian fairy tale The White Bear, King Valemon.

== Plot ==
The land of the far north is ruled by a wise king who has three daughters, one of whom shall one day rule over his kingdom of Winterland. The two older daughters lack depth and understanding, but the youngest is good hearted and kind. She is also uncommonly brave. Unfortunately for the king, she has always desired to live in a land with flowers.

Far to the south, young prince Valemon becomes king, but a powerful and evil witch queen wants to rule the world together with him. The new king does not want great power and has no intention of marrying the witch, so the witch curses the young king by turning him into a polar bear by day, and marks that he has seven years to find someone to fall in love with him. If anyone sees his human face before the seven years are over, he will have to marry the witch.

The bear travels north and enters Winterland. There he meets the young princess, who has her father's gift of being able to speak to animals. She asks the bear why he is so angry, and learns that he is not a bear, but is really the king of Summerland, cursed to look as he does. When she sees the flowers of Summerland reflected in his eyes, she is filled with compassion for the young king and agrees to go to Summerland with him as his wife.

After their arrival, the witch sets about trying to harm the young couple, but is thwarted by the king's mother, who has some mastery of magic as well. Every time the couple has a child, the witch arrives to harm them, but the child disappears into safety before the witch can strike. However, while the children are safe, the princess does not know what has happened to them. She soon falls into despair. Hearing of this, her father sends her a special gift, and asks her to visit him. Her father's love restores her, however, her older sisters convince her to light a candle while her husband sleeps to see what his human face looks like. As soon as she does so, the witch appears and takes Valemon to be hers.

Overcome with guilt, the princess sets out to free him. Along the way, she meets with the queen mother and her three children, all of whom give the princess gifts: scissors that create things out of thin air, boots that climb walls, and a special rug that, if clapped, can make food appear out of thin air.

The princess arrives in the witch's kingdom where Valemon is held in a castle. Disguised as a boy, she creates a wedding dress for the witch, while Valemon pretends to be afflicted by an evil potion the witch gave him that he had secretly spilled. The princess sneaks into the witch's lab. A host of other evil guests arrive at the wedding party, where the princess switches their wine for the potion while Valemon is unaffected. With the demise of the witch, her slaves are freed, and the pair reunites with their children and meets with the king of the Winterland.

== Cast ==
- Jack Fjeldstad as the King of the Winterland
- Maria Bonnevie as Princess
- Tobias Hoesl as King Valemon
  - Steve Kratz as Valemon's voice (Swedish)
  - David Forman as King Valemon's Polar Bear form (puppeteer)
- Monica Nordquist as King Valemon's Mother
- Anna-Lotta Larsson as Witch
- Helge Jordal as the Devil
- Marika Enstad as the Oldest Princess
- Kristin Mack as the Middle Princess
- Espen Skjønberg as the narrator

== Production and release ==
The story was adapted from the Norwegian folktales East of the Sun and West of the Moon and the fairy tale The White Bear, King Valemon, both from the collection of tales gathered by Peter Christen Asbjørnsen and Jørgen Engebretsen Moe. Erik Borge wrote the screenplay. The musical score for the film was composed by Geir Bøhren and Bent Åserud. Filming was completed in Norway and Sweden. The bear in the movie was created by Jim Henson's Creature Shop. The film was produced in Norway, Sweden and Germany. Originally recorded in Norwegian, the film was dubbed in German and English. It was first released on 28 November 1991 in Germany. It premiered in Oslo two weeks later, on 12 December 1991.
