= Tobias Hoesl =

German actor (born 1961)

- Born: 29 September 1961 (age 64); Munich, West Germany

Tobias Hoesl (born 29 September 1961) is a German television actor.

== Selected filmography ==
- 1984: ...e la vita continua, TV miniseries
- 1985: Morenga ... Baron von Treskow
- 1985: The Feather Fairy ... Jacob
- 1986: The Black Forest Clinic, TV series, 2 episodes ... Robert Lösch
- 1986: The Mines of Kilimanjaro ... Dr. Ed Barclay
- 1986: La Storia ... Günther
- 1986: Una donna a Venezia, TV miniseries ... Ricky
- 1987: The Old Fox: Der sanfte Tod, TV ... Jens Gilbert
- 1987: The Old Fox: Die Abrechnung, TV ... Peter Behrend
- 1987: Le lunghe ombre, TV film
- 1987: Lockwood Desert, Nevada ... Christian Land
- 1987: Die Pfauenfeder, TV film ... Plavko
- 1988: Derrick: Eine Reihe von schönen Tagen, TV ... Harald Kernbacher
- 1988: The Post Office Girl (L'Ivresse de la métamorphose), TV film ... Thomas Grund
- 1988: Derrick: Mord inklusive, TV ... Diener
- 1990: Dr. M ... Achim
- 1990: Im Grunde meines Herzens bin ich Elektriker, TV film ... Holger
- 1991: The Polar Bear King (Kvitebjørn kong Valemon) ... King Valemon
- 1992: De terre et de sang, TV film ... Ludwig
- 1992: Derrick: Ein merkwürdiger Privatdetektiv, TV ... Ingo Görner
- 1993: Catherine Courage, TV film ... Paul Grandjean
- 1994: Moscacieca, TV miniseries ... Dominic
- 1994: The Wanderer: Rebirth, TV ... Anton
- 1995: Tatort: Im Herzen Eiszeit, TV ... Rick Heiger
- 1995: ...dann hau ich eben ab, TV film ... Christian Nossmann
- 1995: Il barone, TV miniseries ... Philip Brian Sajeva Jr.
- 1995: Um die 30 (Thirty-Something), TV series
- 1995: Ein Fall für zwei: Ein anständiger Mörder, TV
- 1995: Belle Époque, TV miniseries
- 1996: Terre indigo, TV miniseries ... Yan Richter
- 1996: The Return of Sandokan (Il ritorno di Sandokan), TV miniseries ... James Guilford
- 1997: Il goal del martin pescatore, TV film ... Thomas
- 1997: Derrick: Pornocchio, TV ... Carlos Blecher
- 1998: Winnetous Rückkehr, TV film ... Spencer
- 1998: Eine fast perfekte Scheidung (An Almost Perfect Divorce) ... Martin von Platt
- 1998: HeliCops: Sturzflug, TV ... Christoph Eisfeld
- 1998: The Old Fox: Tod eines Freundes, TV ... Walter Masch
- 1999: Klinik unter Palmen, TV series, 3 episodes ... Ulf Wallin
- 1999: Der Bulle von Tölz: Tod aus dem All, TV ... Dennis Rear
- 1999: Siska: Der Bräutigam der letzten Tage, TV ... Matthias Koch
- 2000: Aeon – Countdown im All, TV miniseries ... Nick Meissner
- 2000: Le ali della vita, TV miniseries ... Dr. Vithold Heisler
- 2000: Für alle Fälle Stefanie: Herzensdieb, TV ... Hardy Krenzler
- 2000: Inspector Rex: Death Via the Internet, TV ... Klaus Kainz
- 2001: Der Fahnder: Mord perfekt, TV
- 2001: Küstenwache: Böser Schatten, TV ... Mark Benning
- 2001: Medicopter 117: Die einzige Zeugin (The Only Witness), TV ... Joachim Lehmann
- 2001: SOKO 5113: Ein mörderischer Fall, TV ... Martin Böhme
- 2002: Polizeiruf 110: Henkersmahlzeit (Last Supper), TV ... Sebastian Teichert
- 2002: Storia di guerra e d'amicizia, TV miniseries ... Fritz
- 2003: Verliebte Diebe, TV film ... Barkeeper
- 2003: In aller Freundschaft: Ein zweites Leben, TV ... Hendrik Stein
- 2003: Kabinett (Cabinet), short film ... Vico
- 2004: Utta Danella: Der Mond im See (The Moon in the Lake), TV film ... Harry Wilbert
- 2004: Leipzig Homicide: Der unsichtbare Tod, TV ... Peter Sawatzki
- 2004: Our Charly: Flieg, Vogel, flieg, TV ... Hajo Röwer
- 2005: Polizeiruf 110: Heimkehr in den Tod (Fatal Return), TV ... Dr. Kortin
- 2006: Die Rosenheim-Cops: Die doppelte Venus, TV ... Krishan Berg
- 2007: Küss mich, Genosse!, TV film ... Patrick Kaminsky
- 2007–2008: Der Arzt vom Wörthersee, TV series, 3 episodes ... Peter Wallböck
- 2008: SOKO Wismar: Zerbrochenes Glas, TV ... Magnus Norlin
- 2009: Stauffenberg – Die wahre Geschichte, TV film ... Friedrich von Broich
- 2009: L'onore e il rispetto, TV series, 1 episode ... Klaus Thorter
- 2009: La Saison des immortelles, TV film ... Klaus Grüber
- 2010: Meine wunderbare Familie: ...auf neuen Wegen, TV ... Kurt Schiller
- 2011: SOKO Kitzbühel: Mordsgewinn, TV ... Veit Bachmann
- 2012: Inga Lindström: Vier Frauen und die Liebe, TV film ... Sondermann
- 2012–2013: Storm of Love, TV series, 9 episodes ... Ari Fleischmann
- 2013: Die Rosenheim-Cops: Dabei sein ist alles, TV ... Lars Wintrich
- 2016: Zoo Doctor: My Mom the Vet: Die Realistin, TV ... Dr. Gregersen
- 2018: SOKO Wismar: Hafen der Ehe, TV ... Michael Kamp
