= Pakketur til Paradis =

- Directed by: Eldar Einarson
- Written by: Eldar Einarson
- Produced by: Eldar Einarson
- Starring: Erik Søby; Gunvor Eliassen; Idar Eliassen; Ola Solum
- Cinematography: Torleif Hauge; Bjørn Jegerstedt
- Edited by: Eldar Einarson; Jan Olav Brynjulfsen
- Music by: Geir Bøhren; Bent Åserud; Somadasa Elvitigala
- Distributed by: Taurus AS
- Release date: February 12, 1982
- Running time: 74 minutes
- Country: Norway
- Language: Norwegian

Pakketur til paradis (Destination: Paradise) is a documentary film from 1982 about five adventurous Norwegians that travel to Sri Lanka. The film was directed by Eldar Einarson, who also wrote the screenplay. The film shows how harmful such travel is with tourists with lots of money and desire in new cultures. The action was improvised and the film is based on situations that arose during filming in Sri Lanka.

== Cast ==
- Erik Søby
- Gunvor Eliassen
- Idar Eliassen
- Anna Live Eliassen
- Jan Tore Lund-Hansen
- John Samuel
- Shiras
- Berit Smith Meyer
- Ola Solum
- Tissahami
