= Erik Thorsby =

Norwegian physician (1938–2021)

- Born: July 13, 1938; Oslo, Norway
- Died: March 23, 2021 (aged 82); Oslo, Norway
- Occupation: Physician
- Spouse: Wenche Medbøe (divorced 1965)

Erik Stein Thorsby (13 July 1938 – 23 March 2021) was a Norwegian physician and professor at the University of Oslo and Oslo University Hospital. He carried out research in immunology, specializing in transplant immunology.

== Career ==
Thorsby studied medicine at the University of Oslo and graduated in 1963. In 1969, he earned his doctorate in medicine.

Thorsby introduced tissue typing and transplant immunology as a field of study in Norwegian medicine, used for identifying tissue type–compatible donors and recipients in transplants. He was also involved in launching Scandiatransplant, the Nordic cooperation organization for organ transplants. He worked at Ullevål University Hospital and Oslo University Hospital. He established the Tissue Type Laboratory at Oslo University Hospital in 1970, which later became the Department of Transplant Immunology. Thorsby was the head of the department from 1970 to 1998. In 1983 he became a professor at the University of Oslo. He was also the chief physician at the Department of Immunology, where he was the head of department from 1998 to 2006. From 1989 to 1990 he was dean of the University of Oslo Faculty of Medicine. Thorsby became the president of the European Federation for Immunogenetics in 2002.

Thorsby conducted extensive research in immunology, particularly on human leukocyte antigen molecules and transplant immunology. He studied the genetic origin of the indigenous people on Easter Island. A DNA study published in 2014 confirmed that the genetic background of the Rapa Nui people is mainly Polynesian, with 16% European elements and 8% from indigenous American peoples. The collection of genetic material from Native American peoples was dated to the period 1280–1495, long before the arrival of Europeans on the island in 1722.

== Awards ==
In 2004, the king appointed Thorsby a commander of the Order of St. Olav "for his research efforts in transplant immunology." He received the Anders Jahre Medical Prize for junior researchers and the Norwegian Research Council's general science award for outstanding research. Thorsby was elected a member of the Norwegian Academy of Science and Letters in 1992.
