= Ragnhild Nygaard =

Norwegian actress (born 1944)

- Born: July 24, 1944 (age 81)
- Occupation: Actress

Ragnhild Nygaard (born July 24, 1944) is a Norwegian actress.

She is known for her roles as Queen Krystalis in the television series Brødrene Dal og spectralsteinene and as Tupsy Larang in the crime miniseries Solospill with Helmer & Sigurdson.

Nygaard was trained as an actor in the United States and was employed at the Norwegian Theater from 1969 to 1977. Since 1977 she has acted as a freelancer, and she has appeared in several productions on NRK's Radio Theater and Television Theater.

Nygaard headed the Norwegian Actors' Equity Association from 1980 to 1991.

== Filmography ==
=== Film ===
- 1974: Ungen as Krestna
- 1978: Operasjon Cobra as Dan's mother
- 1978: Formynderne as Bella Holm
- 1979: Rallarblod as Bygde-Sara
- 1986: Plastposen as a nurse
- 1988: Apprentice to Murder

=== Television ===
- 1966: Goodman Children's Theater: Hansel and Gretel as the witch
- 1977: Solospill as Tupsy Larang
- 1979: Press in various roles
- 1980: Narrespeilet in various roles
- 1980: Slim sala bim (contribution to Rose d'Or)
- 1982: Brødrene Dal og spectralsteinene as Queen Krystallis
- 1985: Television Theater: Du kan da ikke bare gå... as Irmelin's mother
- 1990: Aksjemordet as Mrs. Riisnes

== Theater roles ==
- 1966: Tartuffe (Goodman Theater) as Elmire
- 1970: Oresteia (Norwegian title: Orestien, Norwegian Theater) as Chorus: Elders of Argos and Chorus: The Furies
- 1971: Bernards hus (Norwegian Theater) as Magdalena
- 1972: Ragnhildtreet (Norwegian Theater)
- 1973: Ungen (Norwegian Theater) as Krestna
- 1975: Glasberget (Norwegian Theater)
- 1975: The Good Person of Szechwan (Norwegian title: Det gode mennesket i Sezuan, Norwegian Theater) as the daughter-in-law
- 1979: The Diary of Anne Frank (Norwegian title: Anne Franks dagbok, National Theatre) as Miep Gies
- 1989: And Things That Go Bump in the Night (Norwegian title: Ting som slår gnister i natten, Homansbyen Theater Company) as Ruby
- 1991: When We Dead Awaken (National Theatre) as the nun
