= Vetle Lid Larssen =

Norwegian journalist and novelist

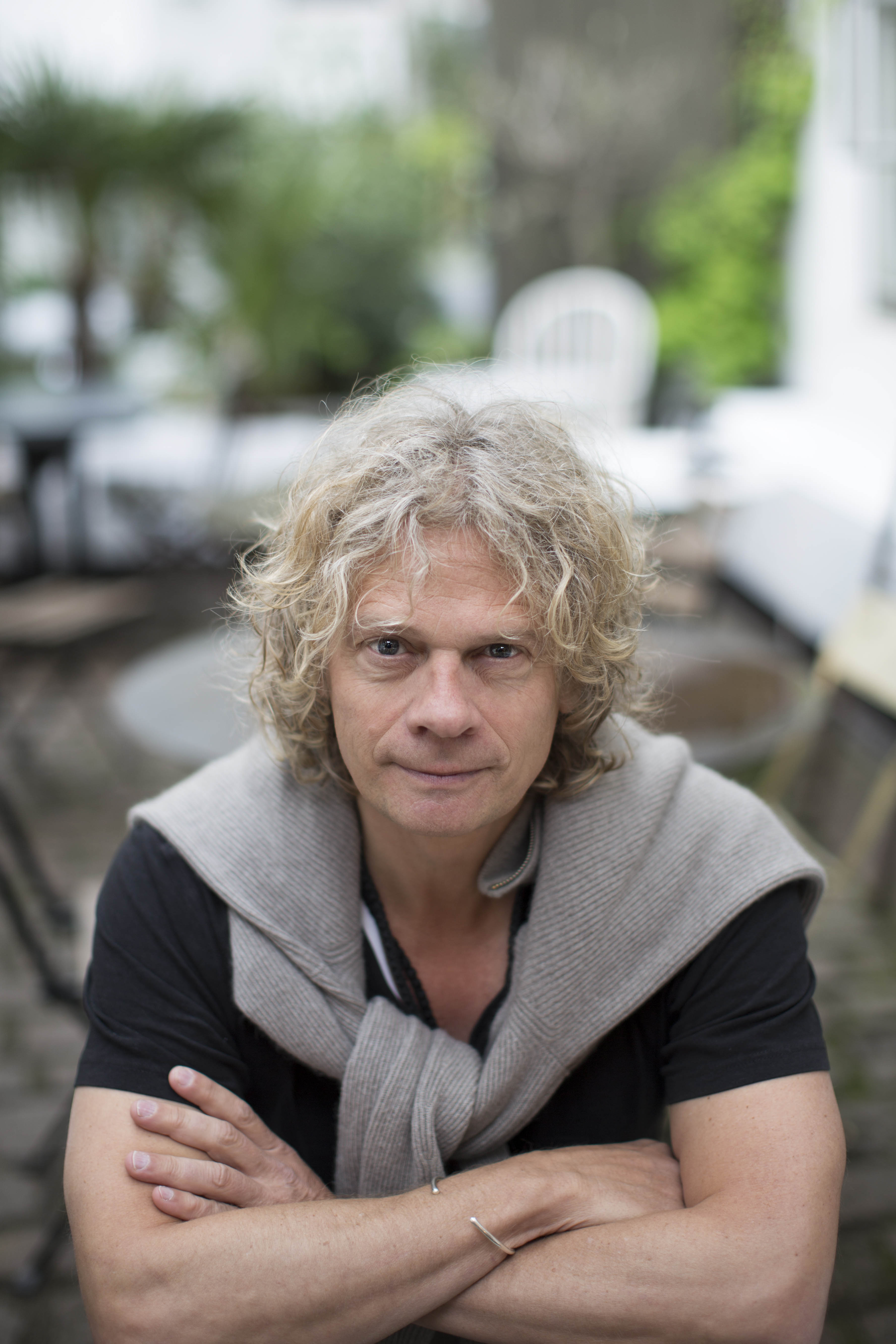
- Born: 2 September 1960 (age 66); Stavanger, Norway
- Occupations: Journalist and novelist
- Parent: Lars Andreas Larssen

Vetle Lid Larssen (born 2 September 1960) is a Norwegian journalist and novelist.

== Biography ==
He was born in Stavanger on 2 September 1960, and is a son of the Norwegian actor Lars Andreas Larssen. He grew up in Oslo, and was an award-winning journalist in the Norwegian dailies Morgenbladet and Aftenposten, before he made his debut in 1990 with the novel 2, which won him much acclaim.

Among his other books are Kjærlighet før øya synker (Love before the island sinks), Anti-sex and Norske Helter (Norwegian heroes).

In 2013 he published the documentary novel 1001 natt (1001 night) - about the fate of two Norwegian slaves in northern Africa, and in 2015 the autobiographical Hvordan elske en far - og overleve (How to love a father - and survive), which both became national bestsellers.

His historical novel Lucias siste reise (2021) was a commercial success and among the bestsellers in Norway that year. He was awarded the Norwegian Booksellers' Prize in 2026 for the historical novel Dragsug.

Lid Larssen is translated to among other Danish, German and Italian.

He is currently columnist in A-magasinet.

== Selected bibliography ==
1990: 2

1996: Kjærlighet før øya synker

1998: Anti-sex

2006: Norske helter

2013: 1001 natt

2015: Hvordan elske en far - og overleve

== Awards ==
Gullpennen (1991)

Arne Hestenes´ journalistpris (1993)

Sarpsborgprisen (1996)
