= De heldige tre konger =

1969 novel by Odd Medbøe

- Author: Odd Medbøe
- Language: Norwegian
- Publisher: H. Aschehoug & Co
- Publication date: 1969
- Publication place: Norway
- Pages: 119

De heldige tre konger: En kort fremtidsroman som utspilles i dag (transl. The Lucky Three Kings: A Short Future Novel Set Today) is a Norwegian science fiction novel by Odd Medbøe published by Aschehoug in 1969. The book is a satire that touches on several current themes from its time, including war as humanitarian intervention, militarism, and the Summer of Love. The plot is based on intelligent cephalopods occupying the land to prevent humans from destroying the planet.

== Plot ==
The novel is divided into two parts. The first part is a first-person account written by an unnamed "Firibier," an intelligent cephalopod. He spends most of the first part of the novel disguised as a boulder on the shores of the Oslo Fjord while he prepares and later observes the Firibier invasion of the land:

... we must take over before man in his confusion destroys himself and allows our planet to sail dead through the universe. Only we have sufficient intelligence and power to save the Earth. We attack man to save life on Earth, even though we must take many lives. Do not think that we are warriors. We want the best. The Almighty has chosen us and given us spirit and responsibility. This is why we must perform our task.

During the first phase of the invasion, marine animals controlled by the Firibiers sink all shipping. The Firibiers ask humanity to surrender, but their emissaries are massacred. The depths of the sea are bombed with nuclear weapons, a calculated radioactive poisoning of all life in the sea. The Firibiers respond with biological warfare, using "homosilioma," a substance that sterilizes men and "makes men mentally a kind of women, while women remain the same." All resistance ceases, and the Firibiers occupy the land.

The second part of the novel goes back in time to the beginning of part one, and it follows the three-man crew on a Soviet–American space expedition to Mars. Reports from Earth give people a view of the conflict with the Firibiers until the homosilioma attack is launched and all communication ceases:

On September 10th, a shrill voice finally came over the speaker. It sounded like a young boy. He shouted: "Who are you, drifting and nagging and nagging here? Don't we have anything to do but talk to heaven? Heaven is on Earth. It's down here, it's heavenly. You can go to hell if you want, but leave us in peace with our playing and dancing."

As the expedition approaches the earth, other radio stations begin to take to the air:

... there was a woman's voice. They could hear her clearly. She spoke on behalf of the local women's council, and she announced ordinances and practical messages. As before, men were ordered to work in their fields of specialization, eight hours a day. Their leisure time and their leisure pursuits were irrelevant to society.

Now the astronauts gradually received more stations, and they began to form a picture of the situation on Earth. It became clear that the Firibiers had been wiped out, but that the women of the Earth had taken over all administration and supervision. ... They heard grievances about female militias, and about female police. They heard criticism and condemnation from women that went out and ravaged like gangs—but never a word came from the men on Earth.

The Firibiers have died from radiation exposure or have been liquidated by the women among the occupied population. The men of the earth, however, are sterile and useless for anything other than supervised work. The three astronauts are welcome to return to Earth as breeding animals in a program to save the human race, hence the title De heldige tre konger 'The Lucky Three Kings' (a pun on Norwegian de hellige tre konger 'the (Holy) Three Kings'):

At the hospital in Bodø, we have set up a separate laboratory. In the same way that animals are artificially inseminated, we will have to use their semen, dilute it, cool it, and transport it by jet in small ampoules all over the world.
