= Odd Einarson =

Norwegian caricaturist and illustrator (1910–1990)

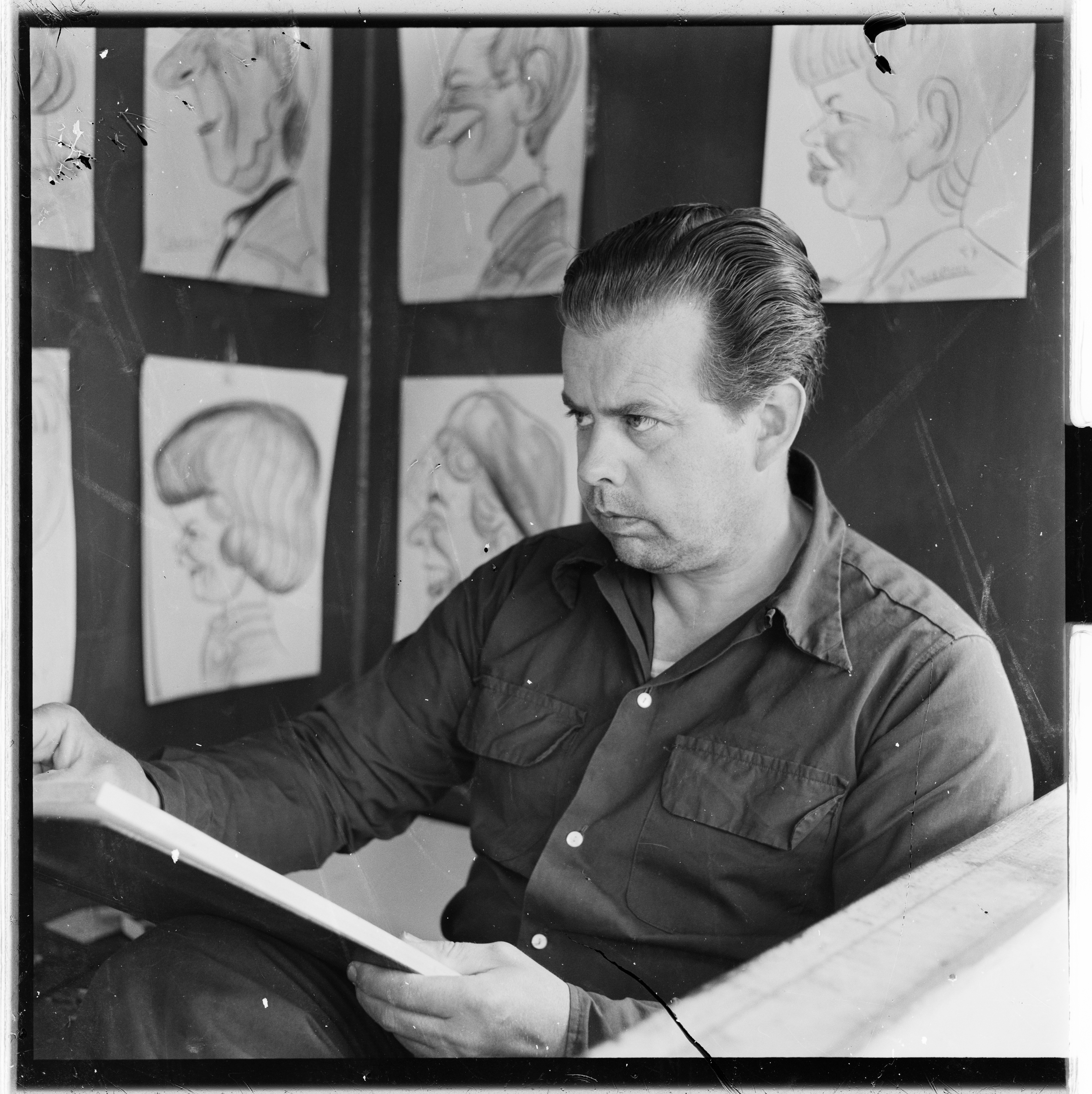
- Odd Einarson in 1954
- Born: June 21, 1910; Bergen, Norway
- Died: October 6, 1991 (aged 81); Kragerø, Norway
- Occupations: Caricaturist and illustrator
- Children: Oddvar Einarson, Eldar Einarson
- Awards: Nordisk Kjetterpris (1990)

Odd Einarson (originally Odd Einarsen, June 21, 1910 – October 6, 1991) was a Norwegian caricaturist and illustrator.

== Family ==
Einarson was born in Bergen, the son of Petrus Johan Einarson and Oline Olsen. He was the father of the filmmakers Oddvar Einarson and Eldar Einarson.

== Education ==
Einarson studied art at the Academy of Fine Arts in Munich under the illustrator Olaf Gulbransson in 1932 and at the Norwegian National Academy of Fine Arts under Søren Onsager in 1940.

== Artistic work ==
Einarson produced both paintings and satirical drawings, and he was connected with the Brochmann movement, endorsed by the magazine Alternativt Samfunn. Together with his fellow illustrator Ernst Berentsen, he published the socially critical cartoon book Du slette tid in 1935, and after the Second World War he published, among other things, the magazines Trollspeilet and § 100. However, Odd Einarson was primarily known as a wandering bohemian with a beret and a lush beard in his "rolling atelier," a car dubbed Ruslebo. He spent just three or four minutes to create caricature drawings of interested passersby, and from 1947 to 1985 he is said to have portrayed over half a million Scandinavians under the signature Einarson. Odd Einarson's works have been purchased by the National Gallery.

== Recognitions and awards ==
1990: Nordisk Kjetterpris (Nordic Heretic Award)

== Legacy ==
In 2017, a fundraising campaign was started to obtain funds to restore Odd Einarsen's car. The vehicle, Ruslebo, was given to the municipality of Kragerø, which joined together with private forces to collect the money.
