= The Mines of Kilimanjaro =

1986 film

- American poster art
- Directed by: Mino Guerrini; Mario Caiano (uncredited)
- Written by: Mino Guerrini
- Produced by: Armando Bertuccioli; Augusto Caminito
- Starring: Tobias Hoesl; Gordon Mitchell; Elena Pompei; Francesca Ferre; Christopher Connelly
- Cinematography: Sandro Mancori
- Edited by: Claudio di Mauro
- Music by: Luigi Ceccarelli
- Production company: Scena Film
- Distributed by: Regional distributors (Italy); Imperial Entertainment (United States)
- Release date: 18 November 1987 (U.S.)
- Running time: 92 minutes
- Country: Italy

The Mines of Kilimanjaro (Italian: Le miniere del Kilimangiaro) is a 1986 Italian adventure film directed by Mino Guerrini and an uncredited Mario Caiano, starring Tobias Hoesl, Gordon Mitchell, Elena Pompei, Francesca Ferre and Christopher Connelly. A troubled production, it was Guerrini's final directorial effort. Its story concerns the search for a lost diamond mine in Kenya during the pre-World War II period.

== Plot ==
Thomas Smith is a professor at the University of California, Berkeley during the 1930s. But in 1917, under his real name of Schmidt, he was part of a group of Wehrmacht officers who set out to uncover the so-called "secret of Africa" and find the legendary Mines of Kilimanjaro, said to hold a colossal fortune in diamonds. After finding their destination and plundering some of its treasures, the men were ambushed by a local tribe. All were killed, with the exception of Schmidt, who survived and, renouncing the temptation of the mine's riches, forged a new life in America.

A mysterious individual, who is aware of Smith's true identity, visits him and attempts to obtain the mine's coordinates through veiled threats of violence, although he is turned down. When the professor and his inquisitive guest are both murdered in quick succession, Smith's assistant Ed Barclay decides to find out the truth and leaves for Mombasa. He joins a scientific expedition in search of the mine, but its diamonds are coveted by criminals and by Nazis who intend to use them to finance the Third Reich's impending war effort.

== Cast ==
- Tobias Hoesl as Dr. Ed Barclay
- Gordon Mitchell as Rolf, or the Dutchman
- Elena Pompei as Eva Kilbrook
- Matteo Corsini as Lord Killbrook
- Francesca Ferre as The Queen
- Christopher Connelly as Professor Thomas Smith/Schmidt
- Franco Diogene as Tai-Ling
- Kiro Huera as Tim, Tai-Ling's right-hand man
- Josette Martial as Tania
- Peter Berling as Johnson, the ruthless businessman
- Joseph Olita as the tribal leader
- Al Cliver as the British governor's aide

== Production ==
Original director Mino Guerrini wrote the film under the title Afrikanter, which remains on the final title card in small characters. His version, dated 1985, was shot on location in Africa. However, despite spending the entire production budget, he delivered less than half of the required footage, and omitted the bulk of the action scenes, leaving the film in an unreleasable state. Producer Augusto Caminito was infuriated, and severed all ties with the veteran helmer.

Caminito was introduced to director Mario Caiano by a mutual friend, and pleaded with him to help finish the feature. Caiano directed ten days of additional filming. Film Editor Claudio Di Mauro, who had worked with Caiano in television, was in charge of directing the second unit. Di Mauro remembered the reshoots as poorly organized by Caminito. He mentioned a scene where the Leopard Men attack an encampment, in which only a few of the actors could pass as fearsome East African warriors. This forced him to shoot around the others, who were hastily recruited North Africans expatriates dressed in simple pink drapes. In another ambush scene, he took advantage of the night to hide those limitations.

Caiano found an existing re-creation of an underground mine at Rome's it:Stabilimenti De Paolis. The studio also had some early 20th century-themed sets built for Once Upon a Time in America, which the production rented. The Tor Caldara natural reserve near Rome stood in for the Kenyan wilderness, and was occasionally complemented with wildlife stock footage. Special effects designer Sergio Stivaletti had built some animatronic animals for the film, but they were ultimately not used.

== Release ==
In Italy, The Mines of Kilimanjaro received its screen certificate on 31 July 1986, and was released theatrically via a network of independent regional distributors. In the United States, the film was released on home video by Imperial Entertainment on 18 November 1987. It was also released on U.K. home video by Imperial's local sister company in April 1988.

On 23 September 2018, The Mines of Kilimanjaro was shown at the Italian National Cinematheque, where it was the closing film of a retrospective dedicated to 1980s Italian action cinema, presented in conjunction with the publication of a book on the subject by genre film historians Antonio Tentori and Fabio Giovannini.

== Reception ==
In Dizionario del Cinema Italiano, a book of record on Italian cinema, Roberto Poppi gives a rather positive assessment of the picture, calling it "an unexpectedly spectacular adventure film", adding that "this minor work by Guerrini keeps you engaged, and on more than one occasion brings to mind the American B-movies of the fifties." British reference book Elliot's Guide to Film on Video deemed it "lively but derivative" and gave it a three on a scale of zero to five. Ballantine Books' Video Movie Guide was less forgiving, rating it a two on a scale of one to five, and complained that "the action is badly choreographed, the music is strident and the historical accuracy is a laugh."
