= Liv Thorsen =

Norwegian actress (1935–2021)

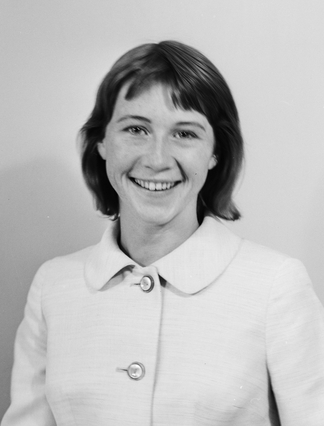
- Liv Thorsen in 1959
- Born: 31 May 1935; Porsgrunn
- Died: 21 December 2021 (aged 86)
- Alma mater: Norwegian National Academy of Theatre

Liv Thorsen (31 May 1935 – 21 December 2021) was a Norwegian actress, best known for her role as Elna in the Norwegian situation comedy Mot i brøstet. Thorsen died on 21 December 2021, at the age of 86.

== Select filmography ==
- 1999 - Tusenårsfesten
- 1999 - Karl & Co (TV series)
- 1993 - Mot i brøstet (TV series)
- 1993 - Fredrikssons Fabrikk (TV series)
- 1992 - Dødelig kjemi (Miniseries)
- 1991 - For dagene er onde
- 1990 - A Handful of Time
- 1988 - Peer Gynt (TV)
- 1988 - Begynnelsen på en historie
- 1984 - SK 917 har nettopp landet (miniseries)
- 1980 - Den som henger i en tråd (TV)
- 1981 - Martin
- 1978 - Operasjon Cobra
- 1977 - Karjolsteinen
- 1976 - Lasse & Geir
- 1976 - To akter for fem kvinner (TV)
- 1974 - Kimen
- 1973 - Anton
- 1973 - Fem døgn i august
- 1972 - Kampen om Mardøla
- 1971 - Voldtekt
- 1969 - An-Magritt
- 1964 - Alle tiders kupp
- 1962 - Sønner av Norge kjøper bil
- 1958 - Ut av mørket
