= Katja Medbøe =

Norwegian actress

- Born: Katja Maria Riosianu Medbøe; 3 December 1945
- Died: 13 November 1996 (aged 50); Nordmarka, Oslo
- Occupation: Actress
- Years active: 1968–1996
- Father: Odd Medbøe
- Relatives: Wenche Medbøe

Katja Maria Riosianu Medbøe (3 December 1945 – c. 13 November 1996) was a Norwegian actress.

She graduated from the Norwegian National Academy of Theatre in 1968, and acted both at Den Nationale Scene and at the National Theatre. Medbøe was best known for her role in the Hustruer-trilogy (Wives), along with Frøydis Armand and Anne Marie Ottersen. She also released records with poetry readings set to music.

In December 1996, Medbøe's sister, Wenche Medbøe, announced that Katja had been missing for three weeks, and made a public appeal for tips. As a result of a head injury she had experienced pain from the stage lighting. On 12 November she had left the hospital and not been seen since. On 3 May 1997, she was found dead in Nordmarka – a forest area north of Oslo. Medbøe had two children. The cause of death was, according to her daughter, Eline Medbøe, suicide.

== Select filmography ==
Year	Title	Role
1971	Voldtekt	Karen
1975	Fru Inger til Østråt	Maid
1975	Hustruer	Kaja Qvist
1980	Den som henger i en tråd	Karen Anna Hustad
1982	Jenny (TV)	Franziska
1985	Hustruer - ti år etter	Kaja
1986	Nattseilere	Andrea
1996	Hustruer III	Kaja
1997	Brent av frost	Mother
