= Det andre skiftet =

- Promotional poster
- Directed by: Lasse Glomm
- Written by: Lasse Glomm
- Based on: Espen Haavardsholm's stories Zink and Istykker
- Produced by: Oddvar Bull Tuhus
- Starring: Mona Malm; Gunnar Enerkjær; Nils Gaup; Frode Rasmussen; Kaare Kroppan
- Cinematography: Erling Thurmann-Andersen
- Edited by: Christian Hartkopp; Fred Sassebo
- Music by: Arne Garvang
- Distributed by: Marcusfilm A/S
- Release date: October 13, 1978
- Running time: 77 minutes
- Country: Norway
- Language: Norwegian

Det andre skiftet (The Second Shift) is a Norwegian drama film from 1978 directed by Lasse Glomm. The film features Mona Malm, Gunnar Enerkjær, Nils Gaup, Frode Rasmussen, and Kaare Kroppan. The film is based on the stories Zink and Istykker by Espen Haavardsholm. The film features a narrator's voice, and it was Lasse Glomm's debut as a director.

== Plot ==
Twenty-three-year-old Olaf (Nils Gaup) comes from Finnmark to take a job at the Jernverket ironworks in Mo i Rana. Here he meets 53-year-old Trond (Gunnar Enerkjær) and his stay-at-home wife Margot (Mona Malm). Trond works as a crane operator at the ironworks and is well liked by his workmates. However, when a love affair develops between Olaf and his wife, middle-aged Trond has his life completely turned upside down. From a seemingly safe existence, a few events turn fateful for his entire existence.

At the same time, internal unrest arises over the question of suspensions in the trade union at the ironworks. Trond is unable to understand the younger people that engage in labor disputes about anything other than purely material demands. He sees the situation as a threat to his own choice and what he himself has loyally supported over the years. He is thrown into a volatile emotional situation in which the shift work at the factory increases the pressure.

== Reception ==
The film received a relatively lukewarm reception from film reviewers, and it was considered by some to be boring and lacking a mood. Aftenposten's Per Haddal was mixed in his review and wrote: "This should be about a fairly 'objectively' considered everyday Norway, about Norwegians under industrialism .... But he reveals himself in the many and almost beloved images of cascading smelting furnaces: they become a kind of purgatory. And thus the leap is not far to the fact that this will in practice be a depiction of lonely people under the stars, so to speak, with the turmoil in their hearts and the disillusionment that their dreams didn't exactly turn out to be so real." Dagbladet's Thor Ellingsen was also not enthusiastic, and he particularly focused on the narrator's role in the film, on which he wrote: "He wants to 'objectify' the people. He thus introduces a narrator's voice. And here something goes wrong. The voice on the audio tape does not tell us anything else or more than what we have already taken in as information. This narrator's voice becomes an appendage, and at worst an obstacle." Verdens Gang's reviewer gave the film a "die throw" of three and described it as: "Well-crafted details in a limping film about the working-class environment."

== Cast ==
- Mona Malm as Margot
- Nils Gaup as Olof
- Gunnar Enekjær as Trond
- Kjell Kjær as the narrator
- Eli Doseth
- Kaare Kroppan
- Birger Nilsen
- Rolf Nilsen
- Bernhard Ramstad
- Frode Rasmussen
- Odd Remen
