= Gränslots =

- Directed by: Lars-Göran Pettersson
- Written by: Lars-Göran Pettersson
- Produced by: Brian Wikström
- Starring: Line Storesund; Anton Hjärtmyr; Göran Engman; Sigrid Huun
- Cinematography: Börje Gustavsson
- Edited by: Ingrid Eriksson
- Music by: Björn Isfält
- Distributed by: Public Motion Picture AB, Stockholm
- Release date: November 9, 1990
- Running time: 105 minutes
- Country: Sweden
- Languages: Swedish, Norwegian

Gränslots (Border Guide) is a Swedish drama film from 1990 directed by Lars-Göran Pettersson. The film was Pettersson's debut as a director, and he also write the screenplay. The film was edited into a TV series and broadcast on SVT2 in 1993. In addition to Swedish actors, the cast includes many Norwegian actors.

== Plot ==
The Swede Henry Eriksson helps his friends and relatives on the other side of the Norwegian border during World War II. He also helps refugees.

== Cast ==
- Line Storesund as Tove
- Anton Hjärtmyr as Sigge
- Göran Engman as Henry, Sigge's father
- Sigrid Huun as Torunn, Sigge's mother
- Bo Lindström as Sigges grandfather
- Bjørn Sundquist as Ragnar, Tove's father
- Helge Jordal as a Norwegian policeman
- Bo Montelius as Åkerberg, the district police superintendent
- Gerhard Hoberstrofer as the forest ranger's assistant
- Kicki Rundgren as the maid
- Unni Kristin Skagestad as the dark-haired woman
