= HAN (film) =

- Directed by: Guro Bruusgaard
- Written by: Guro Bruusgaard; Fijona Jonuzi
- Produced by: Guro Bruusgaard
- Starring: Johannes Joner; Emil Johnsen; Laila Goody; Marte Magnusdotter Solem; Gisken Armand
- Cinematography: Marte Vold
- Edited by: Astrid Skumsrud Johansen
- Music by: Erik Hedin
- Distributed by: Alternativet
- Release date: June 4, 2021
- Running time: 83 minutes
- Country: Norway
- Language: Norwegian

HAN (HIM) is a Norwegian drama film from 2021 directed by Guro Bruusgaard. The film is Bruusgaard's first feature film as a director, and she also wrote the script with Fijona Jonuzi. The film was produced by the production company Alternativet, which Bruusgaard runs together with Katja Eyde Jacobsen, Mariken Halle, and Magnus Mork. The film premiered during the Tromsø International Film Festival in January 2021 and the cinema premiere was on June 4, 2021.

Johannes Joner, Emil Johnsen, and Frank Werner Laug play the three main roles in the film. The film presents three different stories about the male role in Norway and follows the screenwriter Petter, 60 years old, played by Joner, who feels he is a victim of a gender quota when he does not receive financial support for a film about Fridtjof Nansen; unemployed Eirik, played by Johnsen, who loses support from the Norwegian public welfare agency; and 11-year-old Harald, played by Werner Lang, who is reprimanded by his teacher in front of the class.

The film won Eurimages' award for best film in progress and a prize of NOK 500,000 during the 2019 Norwegian International Film Festival. For the film, Marte Magnusdotter Solem was nominated for the 2021 Amanda Award in the category Best Supporting Actress.

== Cast ==
- Johannes Joner as Petter
- Emil Johnsen as Eirik
- Frank Werner Laug as Harald
- Laila Goody as Harald's mother
- Marte Magnusdotter Solem as the teacher
- Gisken Armand as Tone
- Sigrid Huun as Eirik's mother
- Liv Bernhoft Osa as Gudrun
- Per Gørvell as Erling
- Thyri Bergljot Dale as a public welfare agency employee
- Ylva Gallon as Janne
