= Kaare Kroppan =

Norwegian actor (1933–2014)

- Born: 25 April 1933
- Died: 11 May 2014 (aged 81)
- Occupation: Actor

Kaare Kroppan (25 April 1933 – 11 May 2014) was a Norwegian actor.

He was employed at Trøndelag Teater, Riksteatret, Rogaland Teater, Fjernsynsteatret and Den Nationale Scene during his career. In addition to being a stage actor he had film parts, among others in Kimen and Ransom (both 1974), Den sommeren jeg fylte 15 (1976), Kamilla og tyven (1988) and the television series Offshore (1996–1999). He was born in Trondheim, and died there in May 2014.

== Filmography ==
Year	Title	Role	Notes
1974	Kimen	Bonde 1	
1974	Ransom	Donner	
1976	Den sommeren jeg fylte 15	Kristen / Peter's uncle	
1976	Bør Børson II	Petter Småbækdalen	
1977	Kosmetikkrevolusjonen	Troppsjef	
1978	Det andre skiftet		
1979	Kvinnene	Birgits mann	
1981	Martin	Sosialstyremedlem	
1988	Kamilla and the Thief	Joakim Jensen	
1989	Kamilla and the Thief II	Joakim Jensen	
1991	For dagene er onde	Ola	
1994	Villhesten	Hestekaren Tormod	
1995	Kristin Lavransdatter	Halvdan	
1996	Gåten Knut Hamsun	Husvert	
2007	Jakob og campinglivets farer		(final film role)
