= Einarsson =

Einarsson is an Icelandic patronymic, meaning son of Einar. In Old Norse and Icelandic names, the name is not a family name. Notable people with the name include:

- Björn Einarsson (born 1978), Swedish bandy player
- Gísli S. Einarsson (born 1945), Icelandic politician
- Gissur Einarsson (1512–1548), Icelandic Protestant clergyman; first Lutheran bishop in Iceland
- Guðbrandur Einarsson (born 1958), Icelandic politician
- Gylfi Einarsson (born 1978), Icelandic professional football player
- Magnús Einarsson (1092–1148), Icelandic Roman Catholic clergyman; Bishop of Skálholt 1134–48
- Mats Einarsson (born 1960), Swedish politician; member of the Riksdag 1998–2006
- Per Einarsson (born 1984), Swedish bandy player
- Snorri Einarsson (born 1986), Norwegian-Icelandic cross-country skier
- Stefán Einarsson (1897–1972), Icelandic linguist and literary historian
- Sveinn Einarsson (born 1934), Icelandic theater director
- Thorfinn Turf-Einarsson, Earl of Orkney (died 963), Earl of Orkney
- Ulf Einarsson (born 1981), Swedish bandy player
- Vilhjálmur Einarsson (1934–2019), Icelandic Olympic athlete
