= Bryllupet =

- Directed by: Leidulv Risan
- Written by: Leidulv Risan; Bjørn Skaar
- Starring: Mads Ousdal; Susan Badrkhan
- Release date: 14 April 2000
- Running time: 85 minutes
- Country: Norway
- Language: Norwegian

Bryllupet (English: The Wedding) is a 2000 Norwegian drama film directed by Leidulv Risan, starring Mads Ousdal and Susan Badrkhan. The film is about the young biochemistry student Tom (Ousdal), who falls in love with his lab partner, the Iraqi Samira (Badrkhan), and the problems caused by cultural conflict. It was a made-for-TV movie, produced by the Norwegian Broadcasting Corporation.

== Reception ==
In a review for Norwegian newspaper Verdens Gang, Jon Selås gave the movie a "die throw" of three and called it "predictable". Liv Jørgensen of Dagbladet gave it four points, applauding the film's "insight and dramatic devices".
