= Per Einarsson =

Swedish bandy player (born 1984)

Per Einarsson (born May 1, 1984) is a Swedish bandy player who currently plays for Vetlanda BK as a midfielder.

Per has only played for Vetlanda BK where he began playing professionally in 2000.
