= Dangerous Waters (1995 film) =

1995 film

- Directed by: Lars Berg
- Starring: Petronella Barker; Nils Ole Oftebro
- Release date: 14 July 1995
- Running time: 85 minutes
- Country: Norway
- Language: Norwegian

Dangerous Waters (Norwegian: Farlig farvann) is a 1995 Norwegian action film directed by Lars Berg.

== Plot ==
A pair of handcuffs is snapped onto the wrists of Falken (Nils Ole Oftebro), a long-term prisoner with several armed robberies on his conscience. He is being transferred to a maximum-security facility. His head is nearly shaved, and his face remains expressionless. Tired of life behind bars, Falken is desperate to be free. He has formulated a plan to escape—and he intends to carry it out, no matter the cost.
