= Oddvar Einarson =

Norwegian movie director

Oddvar Einarson (born 7 February 1949) is a Norwegian movie director. He made his debut with the film Time i nyttelære in 1967 and has since directed a number of films, some of the best known being: Kampen om Mardøla (1972), Prognose Innerdalen (1981), X (1986), Karachi (1989) and Havet stiger (1990).

In 1987 he won the Norwegian movie award Amanda for best Norwegian film: X.

He is the son of the illustrator Odd Einarson and the brother of the filmmaker and writer Eldar Einarson.

== Filmography ==
- Finanseventyret (2012; documentary)
- Pust på meg (1996)
- Havet stiger (1990)
- Karachi (1988)
- X (1986)
- Prognose Innerdalen (1981)

== See also ==
- The Mardal waterfall
