= Leidulv Risan =

Norwegian film director

Leidulv Risan (born 1948) is a Norwegian screenwriter, film director and professor at The Norwegian Filmschool at Lillehammer. Since 2005 he has been the leader for the screenwriting program at the Film School. Risan is educated at Dramatiska Institutet in Stockholm, Sweden. After his feature film debut as director in 1981 with Martin (The Execution) he has become one of the most experienced persons in the Norwegian film industry, and directed two of the biggest Norwegian productions in the 90s, The Warrior's Heart and The Sunset Boys a.k.a. Waiting for Sunset. The Warrior's Heart was screened out of competition at the 1992 Cannes Film Festival. In 2000s he has mainly written and directed TV series.

== Filmography ==
- Bryllupet (2000)
