= Wenche Medbøe =

Norwegian actress (born 1940)

- Born: July 3, 1940 (age 84); Oslo, Norway
- Occupation: Actress
- Spouse: Erik Thorsby (divorced 1965)
- Father: Odd Medbøe
- Relatives: Katja Medbøe (daughter)

Wenche Elena Riosianu Medbøe (born July 3, 1940) is a Norwegian actress.

== Family ==
Medbøe was born in Oslo, the daughter of the public relations officer Odd Medbøe (1914–1989) and Ecaterina (Katja) Medbøe (née Riosianu) (1911–2011). She is the sister of the actress Katja Medbøe. She married the physician Erik Thorsby in 1961 (divorced 1965), and she is the mother of the visual artists Anne Kristine Thorsby and Katerina Medbøe Eriksen, and the chief physician Per Medbøe Thorsby.

== Career ==
Medbøe studied at the Oslo National Academy of the Arts from 1959 to 1963 and began her career at NRK's Television Theater, where she worked from 1963 to 1965. There her roles included Minne in Arild Brinchmann's production of Leck Fischer's Frisøndag (1961), Borghild in Cora Sandel's Kranes konditori (1963), and Ariel in William Shakespeare's The Tempest (Norwegian title: Stormen, 1964).

She was engaged at the Norwegian Theater from 1969 to 2010. In her early years at the Norwegian Theater, her roles included Electra in Oresteia (1970), Thea Elvsted in Henrik Ibsen's Hedda Gabler (1971), Gerd in Ibsen's Brand (1973), Nina in Anton Chekhov's The Seagull (1974), the title role in Jean Giraudoux's Ondine, Siri von Essen in Per Olov Enquist's Tribadernas natt (1976), and the title role in August Strindberg's Miss Julie (1978). Her later roles included the mother in The Mother of David S. by Yvonne Keuls (1990) and Greta in Tiden är vårt hem by Lars Norén (1995). In 2005, she played Mor Åse in Robert Wilson's production of Peer Gynt, a performance that received the Hedda Award in the production of the year category. In 2010, after 41 years at the Norwegian Theater, she gave her farewell performance in Oscar og den rosa dama. She co-founded the Fairy Tale Theater Hour (Eventyrforteljeteaterstund) at the Norwegian Theater in 1999, which was nominated for the Hedda Award in 2013. In 2017, she returned to the Norwegian Theater to play a psychologist and researcher in Overføring.

== Filmography ==
- 1961: Line as Veslemøy
- 1961: Frisøndag (TV movie) as Minne, a young woman
- 1961: Et øye på hver finger as Kari
- 1963: Kranes konditori (TV movie) as Borghild Stordal
- 1963: Læraren (TV movie) as Evelinde
- 1964: Stormen (TV movie) as Ariel
- 1964: Bernardas hus (TV movie) as Adela
- 1965: Det angår ikke oss (TV movie)
- 1965: Smeltedigelen (TV movie) as Susanna Walcott
- 1966: Reisen til havet as the curator
- 1969: Taxi (TV miniseries) as Vibeke
- 1976: Nitimemordet (TV miniseries) as Monica Søderstrøm
- 1978: Operasjon Cobra as Fredrik's mother
- 1980: Arme, syndige menneske as a nurse
- 1995: Kristin Lavransdatter as Gunnhild
- 2007: Hva skjer 'a Jonatan as Marie
- 2013: Hotel Cæsar (TV series) as Sister Maria
- 2018: Rekyl (TV miniseries) as a nun
