= Knut Risan =

Norwegian actor (1930–2011)

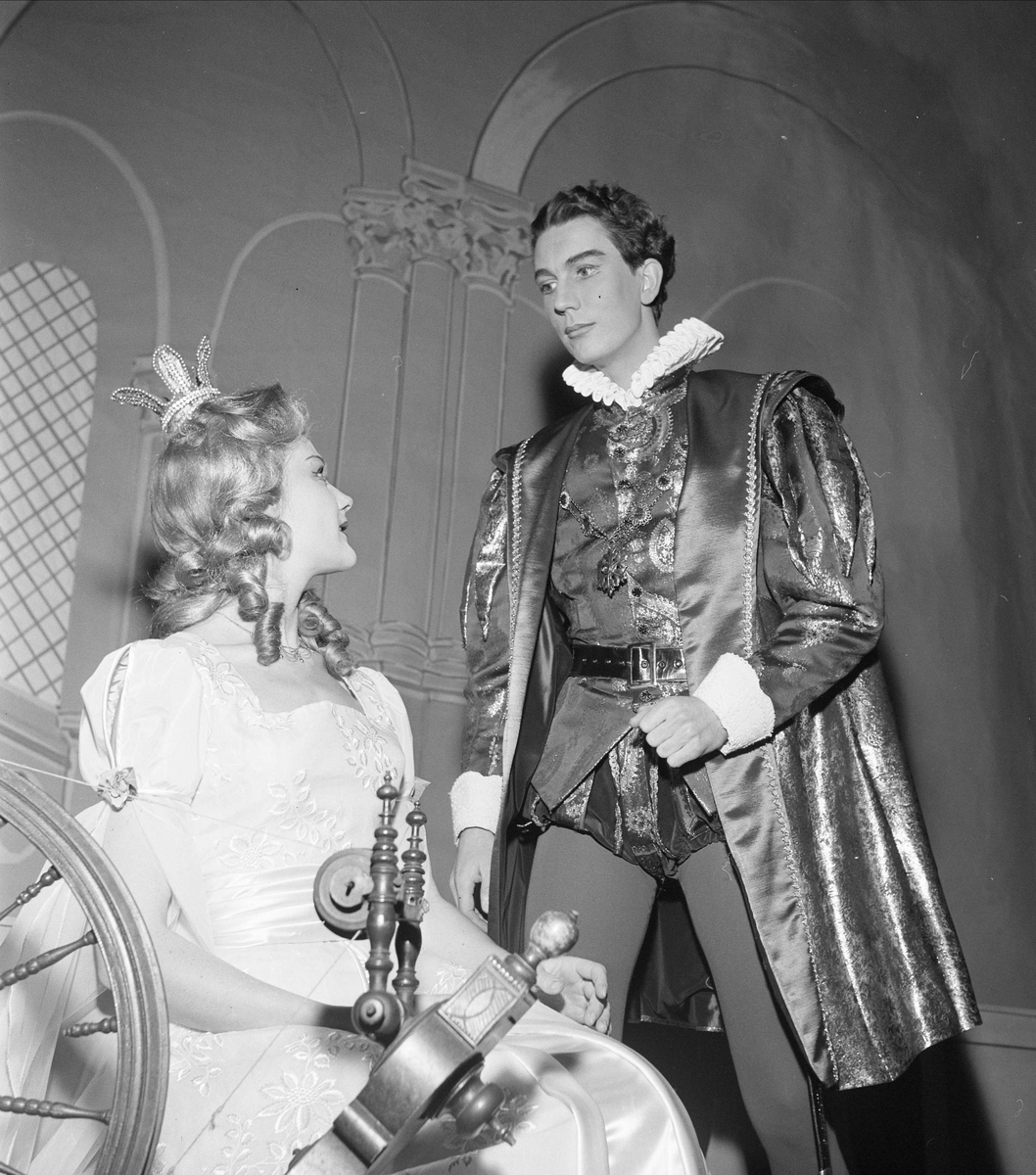
Knut Risan with actress Bente Børsum in 1958

Knut Risan (19 February 1930 – 1 February 2011) was a Norwegian actor.

He was born in Trondheim, and made his stage debut at Nationaltheatret in 1956. He was employed here until 1998, and had guest appearances at the Norwegian National Opera, Den Nationale Scene and Riksteatret. He is remembered for his roles in Reisen til julestjernen and for the voiceover in Tři oříšky pro Popelku, shown every Christmas in Norway.

He was a prolific voice actor, and did many Norwegian dubs of Disney films. He voiced Mr. Snoops in the dub of The Rescuers, Happy in the 1994 dub of Snow White and the Seven Dwarfs (1937 film), the title character in the dub of Robin Hood (1973 film), Basil of Baker Street in the dub of The Great Mouse Detective, King Triton in the dub of The Little Mermaid (1989 film) and Tod in the dub of The Fox and the Hound.

He was married to Astrid Folstad.
