= Odd Medbøe =

Norwegian journalist, public relations officer, and author

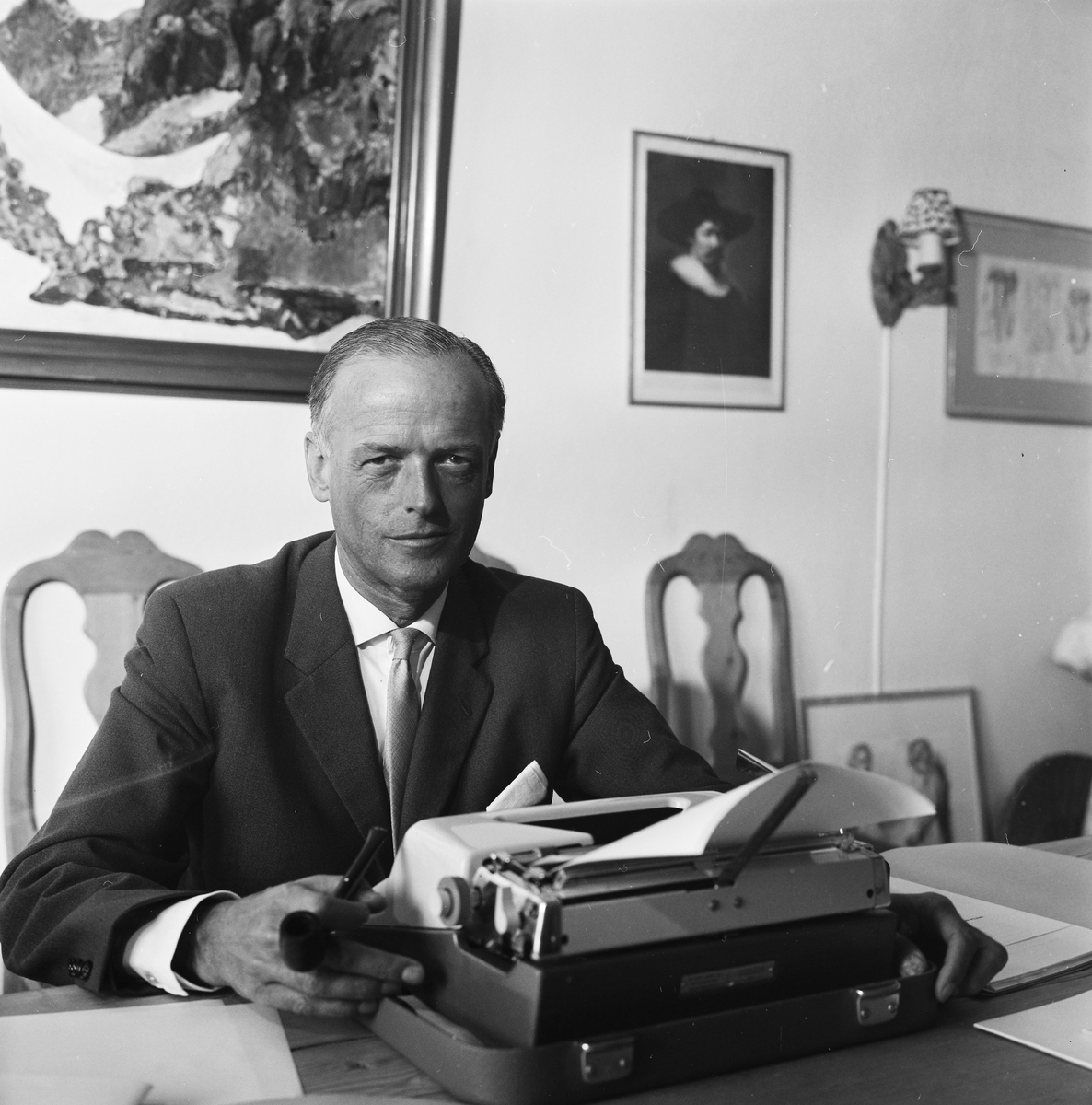
- Born: June 21, 1914; Christiania (now Oslo), Norway
- Died: February 17, 1989 (aged 74)
- Occupations: Journalist, public relations officer, author
- Children: Wenche Medbøe, Katja Medbøe

Odd Harald Medbøe (June 21, 1914 – February 17, 1989) was a Norwegian journalist, public relations officer, and author.

Medbøe started working as a journalist for Nationen in 1933, was the editor of Press Telegraph and a correspondent for Politiken from 1945 to 1946, and was the press manager at Norwegian Air Lines and Scandinavian Airlines from 1946 to 1979. He was one of the founders of the Norwegian Public Relations Association (NPRA) in 1949 and the International Public Relations Association (IPRA) in 1952. He was chairman of the NPRA from 1955 to 1960, president of the IPRA from 1957 to 1958, and chairman of the Artists' Association (Kunstnerforeningen) from 1974 to 1979.

Medbøe also wrote novels, short stories, poems, plays, and non-fiction books. He was the father of the actress Katja Medbøe, the actress Wenche Medbøe, the photographer Harald Medbøe, and the journalist Eva Fosse.

== Bibliography ==
- Jet-fly og raketter, non-fiction for children (1951)
- Stakars Jørgen, novel (1964)
- Kong Olavs ferd til Østerland, reportage book from King Olav's journey to Thailand and Iran (1965)
- Spillet, play (1966)
- Med Kongen til misjonsfeltet i Etiopia, reportage book, coauthor (1966)
- De heldige tre konger, novel (1969)
- Jørgen kommer hjem, novel (1972)
- Flax: forunderlige historier fra en flyreise gjennom livet (1980)
