= Eldar Einarson =

Norwegian filmmaker and writer (born 1947)

- Born: May 8, 1947 (age 77)
- Occupation(s): Filmmaker and writer
- Father: Odd Einarson
- Relatives: Oddvar Einarson

Eldar Einarson (born May 8, 1947) is a Norwegian filmmaker and writer.

== Family ==
Eldar Einarson is the son of the illustrator Odd Einarson and the brother of the filmmaker Oddvar Einarson.

== Career ==
After completing his machinist's exam, he quit his career as a sailor at the end of the 1960s to start as a stagehand and actor at Scene 7 and the National Traveling Theater.

From 1972 to 1982 he produced over thirty documentaries for NRK. In feature films, he has worked as a camera operator, recording manager, production manager, producer, screenwriter, and director. From 1982 to 1985, Einarson was associated with Christiania Bank's film company Movieteam, and he produced films and videos for the business world.

In 1975, he made his debut as a feature film director with Faneflukt based on his own original screenplay. This was followed by Kosmetikkrevolusjonen (1977) and Pakketur til Paradis (1980), and finally For dagene er onde (1991). He made his debut as an author in 1999 with the children's book Rotteøgleskogen.

== Filmography ==
- 1975: Faneflukt
- 1976: Vindu mot vår tid: Kragerø (TV)
- 1977: Kosmetikkrevolusjonen
- 1980: Pakketur til Paradis
- 1991: For dagene er onde

== Bibliography ==
- 1999: Rotteøgleskogen, children's book
- 2001: Djevelens gap, children's book
