= Frøydis Armand =

Norwegian actress (1949–2022)

- Born: 9 April 1949; Norway
- Died: 11 October 2022 (aged 73); Norway
- Occupation: Actress
- Children: 2

Frøydis Armand (9 April 1949 – 11 October 2022) was a Norwegian actress. She was the daughter of actor Eilif Armand, and sister of Merete Armand and Gisken Armand, both actresses. She worked at Nationaltheatret (the National Theatre) from 1972 onward, acting in plays such as Henrik Ibsen's Little Eyolf, and Shakespeares Othello. Though primarily a stage actress, Armand was probably best known to the general audience as one of the three protagonists in Anja Breien's Hustruer–trilogy: Hustruer (1975), Hustruer – ti år etter (1985) and Hustruer III (1996).

Armand had a child from a marriage to actor Helge Jordal, and another child from a relationship with actor Kai Remlow. She died on 10 October 2022, at the age of 73.

== Select filmography ==
- 1974: Mors hus
- 1975: Hustruer
- 1980: Nedtur
- 1985: Hustruer - ti år etter
- 1989: Bryllupsfesten
- 1996: Hustruer III
- 1999: Sejer - se deg ikke tilbake (TV)
- 2000: Aberdeen
- 2002: Jul på Månetoppen
- 2007: Berlinerpoplene (TV)
- 2009: Hotel Cæsar (TV)
