= Alf Cranner =

Norwegian folk singer (1936–2020)

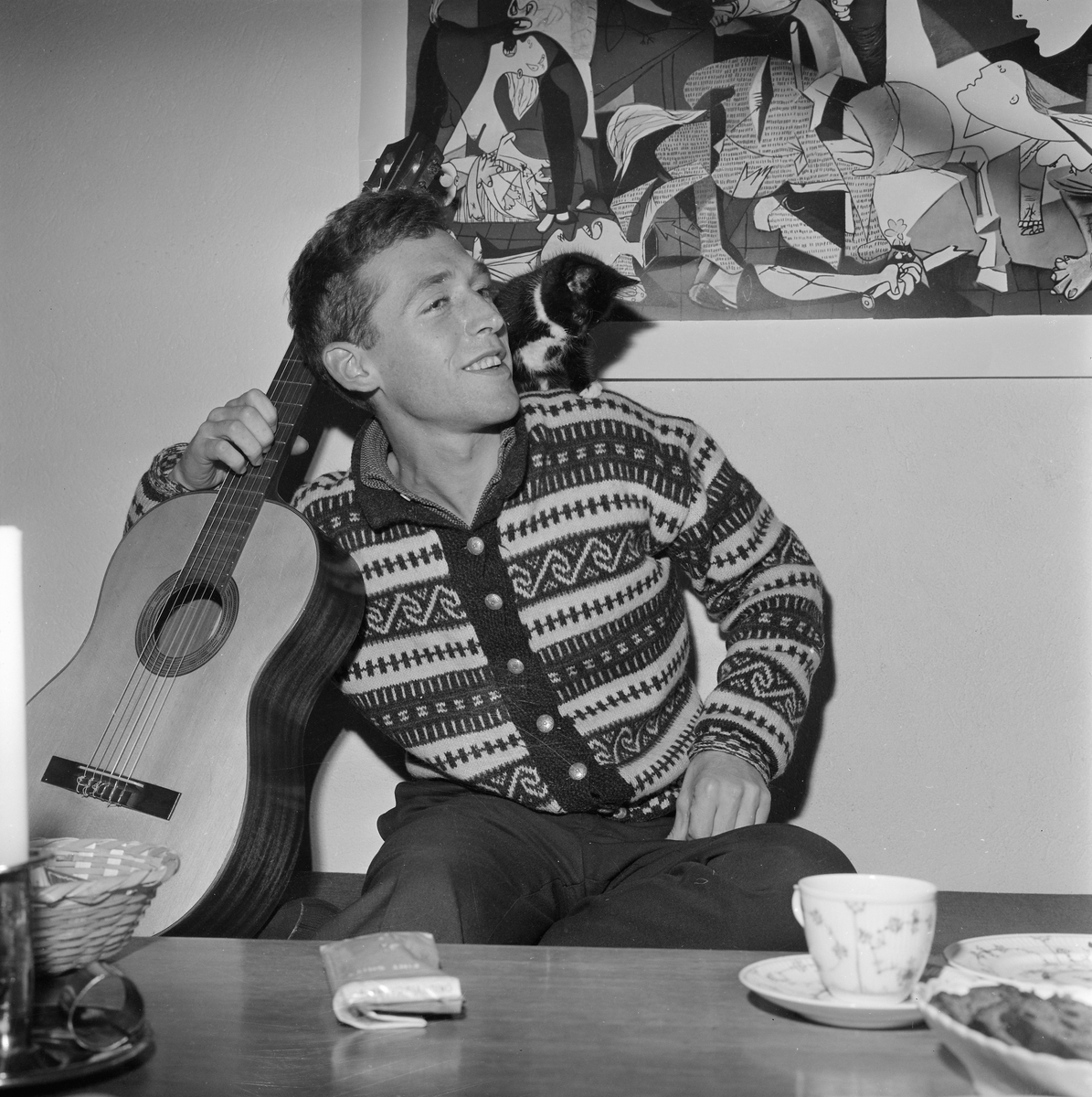
- Alf Cranner in 1965
- Born: 25 October 1936; Oslo, Norway
- Died: 3 March 2020 (aged 83)
- Occupations: visesanger, komponist, gitarist, forfatter og maler

Alf Cranner (25 October 1936 – 3 March 2020) was a major Norwegian folk singer, lyricist and painter, considered by many to be the pioneer of the Norwegian folk music wave of the 1960s. The citation for the award of Evert Taube Memorial Fund Grant 1994, to Cranner states: «Det är motiverat att anse honom som sin tids fader för den norska viskonsten» (It is motivated by the regard of him as the father of the Norwegian folk music genre). He is known for several popular folk music interpretations and beautiful folk tunes, including these: Å, den som var en løvetann with lyrics by another great Norwegian folk singer and lyricist Alf Prøysen (1914–1970), Bare skrap and Den skamløse gamle damen with lyrics by Klaus Hagerup and Sjømannsvise with the text of Harald Sverdrup. Among Cranner folk songs with his own lyrics is Båt til lyst and Hambo i fellesferien two of the best known. The folk song Din tanke er fri, is Cranner translation of the German Die Gedanken sind frei.

== Background and works ==
Alf Cranner was born in Oslo, and studied painting at Statens Kunst- og Håndverksskole (National Arts and Crafts School), where he also taught music and drawing until he retired in 1998.

Cranner received violin lessons as a child (by among others his grandfather Ingvald Cranner), and began playing guitar as a 13-year-old. He had diverse musical interests. Cranner played classical guitar and hung out in jazz circles. In 1961 he became a member of the club Visens venner (friends of folk song). Here he met with among others the Swedish folk singer Olle Adolphson, which was a great influence when he determined the future career. Here he also began his work with Norwegian folk songs, which came to characterize his repertoire until the mid-1970s.

Rolv Wesenlund, who was then head of the recording label Philips, offered Cranner a record contract in 1963, and the following year came the LP Fiine antiquiteter. It consists of 18 Norwegian folk songs, adapted and performed by Cranner accompanied on guitar only. In 1964 he became acquainted with Alf Prøysen, a relationship that was crucial for Cranner's further development. Prøysen wrote several lyrics that Cranner put melody to, including Å, den som var en løvetann. At the same time he met the composer Geirr Tveitt, a meeting that resulted in the LP Både le og gråte (1964), where Cranner composed tunes to poems by Jakob Sande.

This was in a time when a variety of other Nordic folk singers like Cornelis Vreeswijk, Alf Hambe and Birgitte Grimstad released their first LP recordings. There was evolving a good environment for a young folk singer and multi talented artist to flourish. In 1966 Cranner went on a tour with the poet Harald Sverdrup organized by Den Norske Bokklubben. A recording of the concert in the University Hall at the University of Oslo resulted in a release of the LP Vers og viiiiiiser. In 1967 Cranner published what is likely to be his most important album in the 60's, Rosemalt sound. Here he collaborated with composer and musician Alfred Janson, and combined the folk song tradition with jazz. In the years to come up to 1970, many other Norwegian folk singers also debuted, including Lillebjørn Nilsen, Lars Klevstrand, Åse Kleveland, Finn Kalvik, Ole Paus and Øystein Sunde. This was called the Norwegian Visebølgen (the Norwegian folk music wave) where Cranner was one of the leading figures.

In the 1970s, he began a collaboration with author and causeur Odd Børretzen, and they released two LP's together with footage from the concerts. Cranner went into this decade as a mature folk artist, both as composer and lyricist. He received a Spellemannsprisen 1974 in the class folk songs for the album Trykt i år and Spellemannsprisen 1977 in the class folk songs for the album Vindkast. In the 1980s, he collaborated again with jazz musicians, including Egil Kapstad and the band Lava. In 2003, came the compilation album 50 beste fra 40 år. His latest releases are Som en rose (2004), in which he has translated and interpreted the Scottish author Robert Burns, with a dazzling lineup amongst them Knut Reiersrud and Arild Andersen, and I går, i dag, i morgen (2006), which is a live recording from the anniversary concert at the Concert Hall, in connection with the celebration of his 70th. birthday.

Alf Cranner has also written music for theater including in collaboration with Klaus Hagerup, and to Romeo og Julie under the direction of Kjetil Bang-Hansen put up on Det Norske Teatret and to the films Jentespranget from 1972 and Faneflukt from 1973. In 2001, he published the book Jordbundet og himmelvendt, which is a biography of his grandfather, the inventor Christian Holberg Gran Olsen. In 2007 he released the Alf Cranner's visebok: I Adrians hus – sangpoesi og viser.

Alf Cranner has been a resident of Kragerø Municipality since the 1960s.

== Awards and honors ==
- Spellemannprisen 1974 in the class folk songs for the album Trykt i år
- Spellemannprisen 1977 in the class folk songs for the album Vindkast
- Gammleng-prisen in the class folk songs 1984
- Work of the Year (lyrics) from NOPA, for the album Hvis ikke nå – når da (1989)
- Kardemomme grant in (1993)
- Evert Taube's Memorial Fund grant (1994)
- Alf Prøysen's Honorary Award i (1998)
- Telemark County's Culture Prize (1999)
- Kragerø Municipality's Culture Prize (2000)
- Kongens fortjenstmedalje i gull (2010)

== Discography ==
- Fiine antiquiteter (1964)
- Både le og gråte (1964)
- Vers og viiiiiiser (1966) with Harald Sverdrup
- Rosemalt Sound (1967)
- Almuens opera (1970)
- Odd Børretzen og Alf Cranner i levende live på Sandvika kino en kald desemberdag i 1973 (1974) with Odd Børretzen
- Trykt i år (1974)
- Vindkast (1977)
- Hva er det de vil? Live from ABC-Teateret (1980) with Odd Børretzen
- Din tanke er fri (1985)
- Sanger om fravær og nærvær (1989)
- 48 viser (1992)
- Kafé Kaos (1995)
- 50 beste fra 40 år (2003)
- Som en rose (2004)
- I går, i dag, i morgen (2006)
