= Knut Faldbakken =

Norwegian novelist

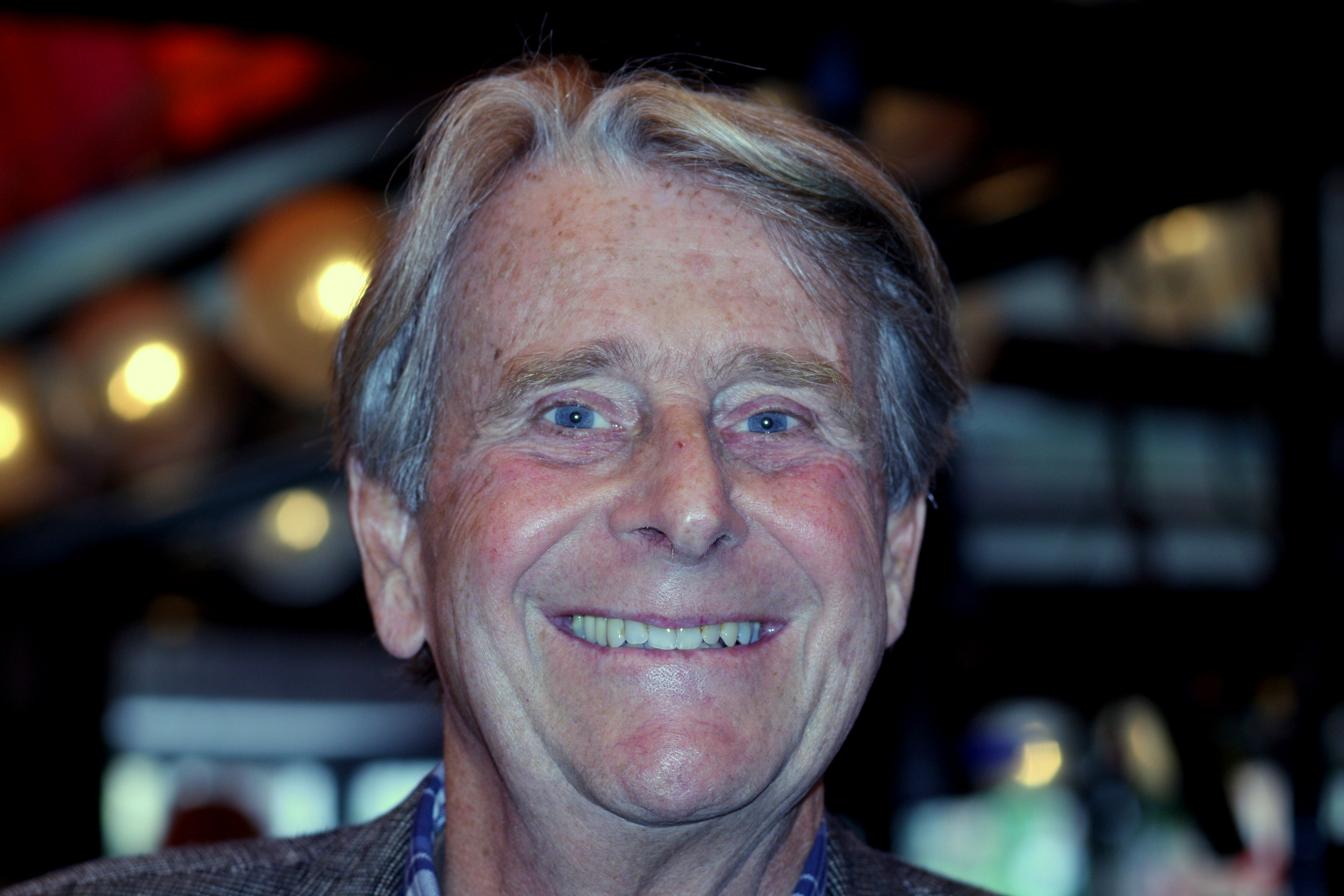
Knut Faldbakken 2011

Knut Faldbakken (born 31 August 1941, in Hamar) is a Norwegian novelist.

== Life and career ==
He studied psychology at Oslo University, and then worked as a journalist. Faldbakken visited a number of countries, working variously as a bookkeeper, sailor, and factory worker, and began writing books in 1967 while living in Paris.

He was editor of the literary magazine Vinduet (The Window) between 1975 and 1979.

His sons Stefan Faldbakken and Matias Faldbakken have achieved recognition as a film director and a novelist respectively.

His books have been published in 21 countries and translated into 18 languages, and they have sold two million copies worldwide.

== Selected bibliography ==
- Maude danser (1971). The Sleeping Prince, trans. Janet Garton (1988)
- Insektsomme (1972). Insect Summer, trans. Hal Sutcliffe and Torbjørn Støverud (1991)
- Uår. Aftenlandet (1974). Twilight Country, trans. Joan Tate (1993)
- Uår. Sweetwater (1976). Sweetwater, trans. Joan Tate (1994)
- Adams dagbok (1978). Adam's Diary, trans. Sverre Lyngstad (1988)
- Bryllupsreisen (1982). The Honeymoon, trans. Liv Myhre (1987)

== Awards and honors ==
- 1969 - Gyldendal's grant
- 1977 - Nominated for the Nordic Council Literature Prize for the novel Uår. Sweetwater
- 1978 - Riksmålsforbundet's literature prize
- 1988 - Hedmark Prize
- 1988 - Honorary member of NIFS, Norwegian Interest Association for Stuttering and Disfluent Speech
- 2005 - Hedmark County Council's Cultural Prize
- 2006 - Hamar Prize
- 2012 - Brage Prize (Honorary Prize)
