= Sverre Brandt =

Norwegian theatre worker and playwright

Sverre Brandt (3 March 1880 – 16 July 1962) was a Norwegian theatre worker and playwright, born in Trondheim. He is remembered for his children's play Reisen til Julestjernen from 1924, which has been staged numerous times at theatres in Scandinavia, and also adapted into a film. He was financial manager at Nationaltheatret from 1919 to 1948.
