= Vilde Marie Zeiner =

Norwegian actress (born 1999)

- Born: July 7, 1999 (age 26); Asker, Norway
- Occupation: Actress

Vilde Marie Zeiner (born July 7, 1999) is a Norwegian actress.

== Career ==
Her first role as an actress was as Sonja in the film Reisen til julestjernen, which premiered on November 9, 2012.

== Filmography ==
- 2012: Reisen til julestjernen as Sonja
- 2016: Costa del Kongsvik, season 2
