= Ola Solum =

Norwegian film director

Ola Solum (17 July 1943 – 28 June 1996) was a Norwegian film director. In 1983, he directed the documentary Kamera går! – Norsk filmproduksjon gjennom 75 år (Camera Running - 75 Years of Norwegian Film Production). One of Norway's greatest directors, he was particularly known for Orion's Belt, which premièred in 1985 and won four Amanda Awards, including best Norwegian film of the year. He also wrote scripts for a number of Norwegian films.

== Career ==
Solum began his career as a director in the early 1960s, writing and directing short documentary and educational films primarily for Norsk Documentarfilm A/S, by whom he was employed beginning in 1964, but also for other companies, such as a film about the Norwegian State Railways made with Ed Epstein for ABC-Film in 1966. In 1968 he co-directed Bare et liv (Only One Life - the Story of Fridtjof Nansen), a Norwegian-Soviet co-production. The Norwegian production partner for this film was Norsk Film, a company with which he was associated for the rest of his career. He was one of the young film makers supported by that company, and was a member of the Vampyrfilm group.

He made his solo feature-film directing début in 1976 with Reisen til julestjernen (Journey to the Christmas Star), a children's film with a stellar cast which has since been shown on NRK every Christmas. He also wrote the shooting script. In 1978, he made Operasjon Cobra (Operation Cobra), which was intended for older children and successfully used their language, earning praise from Norsk Film. He was therefore given the assignment to direct Carl Gustav, gjengen og parkeringsbandittene (1982) in connection with Norsk Film's 50th anniversary.

In 1985 Solum directed Orion's Belt. The film was a big success both in Norway, where it was seen by some 700,000 people, and abroad. It won four Amanda Awards, including best Norwegian film of the year,. It had an effect on the Norwegian film industry, sparking the so-called "helicopter period" of films marked by internationalisation (partly as a result of the need for international financial support for such large projects) and emphasising suspense and special effects; it was listed in Dagbladet in 2007 as the tenth most important Norwegian film. His next film, Turnaround (1987), was not even shot in Norwegian and was therefore ineligible for state financing.

Solum was appointed artistic director of Norsk Film in 1982 but resigned to take over the direction of Wayfarers (Landstrykere, 1989) after the original director became ill. The film was a success, but required two years and 12 million kroner over budget, leading amongst other things to a change in leadership at Norsk Film.

After this, he directed only two more feature films before his death from cancer in Oslo in June 1996: The Polar Bear King, a well received children's film, and Trollsyn, for which he again took over directing duties. In 1990–93 he ran his own production company, Alpha Film A/S.

In addition to the Amanda Awards for Orion's Belt, Solum three times won the Norwegian cinema managers' award, Sølvklumpen, in 1978, 1980 and 1985.

== Filmography ==
- 1976 - Reisen til julestjernen
- 1978 - Operasjon Cobra
- 1982 - Carl Gustav, gjengen og parkeringsbandittene
- 1982 - Pakketur til Paradis
- 1983 - Kamera går! – Norsk filmproduksjon gjennom 75 år
- 1985 - Orion's Belt
- 1987 - Turnaround
- 1990 - Landstrykere
- 1991 - The Polar Bear King
- 1994 - Trollsyn (Second Sight)
