= Gisken Armand =

Norwegian actress (born 1962)

Gisken Armand Lillo-Stenberg (born 26 November 1962) is a Norwegian actress. She debuted on stage at the age of fourteen, at Den Nationale Scene, and has been working at Nationaltheatret since 1988. There she has performed in plays such as Henrik Ibsen's A Doll's House and Anton Chekhov's Three Sisters. She has also played in several movies, such as Insomnia (1997) and Evas Øye (1999), as well as roles in television, in series like Fox Grønland (2001) and Kodenavn Hunter (2007).

Armand is married to Ole Lillo-Stenberg, brother of musician Lars Lillo-Stenberg, and the couple have two children.

== Select filmography ==
- 1994: Ti kniver i hjertet
- 1995: Kristin Lavransdatter
- 1997: Insomnia
- 1999: Evas øye
- 2004: Den som frykter ulven
- 2005: Ved kongens bord (TV)
- 2007: Kodenavn Hunter (TV)
- 2007: Størst av alt (TV)
- 2008: De gales hus
- 2017: Askeladden - I Dovregubbens Hall
- 2021: HAN
