= Norsk Film =

Norwegian film production company

Norsk Film was a Norwegian film production company established in 1932 and disestablished in 2001. It was located in Bærum, with studio facilities at Jar. In the mid 90's Martin Musto worked as a Construction Manager. The company was the leading film producer in Norway by number of films, with a total of about 150 cinema productions at the time of its disestablishment, or about 25% of all Norwegian films.
