= List of Norwegian films of the 1980s =

Films produced in Norway in the 1980s:

== 1980s ==
Title	Director	Cast	Genre	Notes
1980
Belønningen	Bjørn Lien		Drama	Entered into the 12th Moscow International Film Festival
Life and Death	Petter Vennerød, Svend Wam	Sossen Krohg, Wenche Foss	Drama	The Norwegian entry to the Academy Award for Best Foreign Language Film in 1981.
1981
Betrayal	Vibeke Løkkeberg	Helge Jordal, Vibeke Løkkeberg	Drama	
Julia Julia	Petter Vennerød, Svend Wam	Gunilla Olsson, Wenche Foss	Comedy	The Norwegian entry to the Academy Award for Best Foreign Language Film in 1982.
1982
50/50	Oddvar Bull Tuhus		Drama	
1983
Hockeyfeber	Oddvar Bull Tuhus		Drama, Sports	
1984
…men Olsenbanden var ikke død	Knut Bohwim	Arve Opsahl	Comedy	13th movie in the Olsenbanden franchise
On the Threshold	Leif Erlsboe		Drama	Entered into the 14th Moscow International Film Festival
1985
Adjø solidaritet	Petter Vennerød, Svend Wam	Wenche Foss	Drama	
Burning Flowers	Eva Dahr	Torstein Holmebakk, Lise Fjeldstad	Drama, Romance	
Noe helt annet	Morten Kolstad	Trand Kirvaag, Knut Lystad, Lars Mjøen	Black Comedy, Horror	
Orion's Belt	Ola Solum	Helge Jordal, Sverre Anker Ousdal	Action, Thriller	
Wives: Ten Years After	Anja Breien	Anne Marie Ottersen	Comedy / drama	The Norwegian entry to the Academy Award for Best Foreign Language Film in 1986.
1986
Hard Asphalt	Sølve Skagen		Drama	The Norwegian entry to the Academy Award for Best Foreign Language Film in 1987 and entered into Moscow
Hud	Vibeke Løkkeberg		Drama	Screened at the 1987 Cannes Film Festival
X	Oddvar Einarson		Drama	1987 Amanda Award for best film
1987
Etter Rubicon	Leidulv Risan	Sverre Anker Ousdal	Thriller	
The Ice Palace	Per Blom		Drama	Based on a novel by Tarjei Vesaas with the same name; The Norwegian entry to the Academy Award for Best Foreign Language Film in 1989.
The Pathfinder	Nils Gaup	Mikkel Gaup	Adventure / action / drama	The first-ever movie made in Northern Sami.; Nominated for Academy Award for Best Foreign Language Film in 1988.
1988
Kamilla and the Thief	Grete Salomonsen	Dennis Storhøi, Morten Harket	Drama	First feature film production in the town of Kristiansand.
Kannibal massakren	John Christian Møller	Øivind Albinussen, Torilo Bentsen, Kennith Jansen	Horror, Short	
Den norske drillbormassakren	John Christian Møller	Alf Albino, Øivind Albinussen, Jill Marie Eriksen	Horror, Short	
1989
Blücher	Oddvar Bull Tuhus	Helge Jordal	Action, Thriller	
A Handful of Time	Martin Asphaug	Espen Skjønberg	Drama	Winner of the "Best Film" award at the Amanda awards in 1990.; The Norwegian entry to the Academy Award for Best Foreign Language Film in 1990.
Kamilla and the Thief II	Grete Salomonsen	Dennis Storhøi, Morten Harket	Drama	
Olso Terror	John Christian Møller	"Candy", Finno Dybvik, Hilde Gjektnes	Horror	
Jeg hater dere (Drep eller dø)	John Christian Møller	Øivind Albinussen, Øyvin Holthe, Erling Ramskjell	Horror, Short	
