= Den store klassefesten =

Norwegian television series

Den store klassefesten (The great class party) is a Norwegian chat show which was shown on NRK1 in 2000, 2001, 2005 and again from 2008. The programme was part of NRK's Saturday night line-up and the presenter was Dan Børge Akerø. Working with him, Akerø had the comedians Øystein Bache and Rune Gokstad who did a lot of the presenting work in the series. The series is regarded as one of NRK's biggest successes of the 2000s and won the prize for best chat show at Gullruten 2002. Previously, Akerø had won the prize for best presenter for the programme at Gullruten 2001.

The series premiered on NRK on 12 February 2000 and was shown on Saturday nights. The series has run for four seasons.

== About the program ==
The programme's concept consists of two famous guests meeting together with their old class for a fantastic reunion. The two guests, (and their classes) compete in different games, sports, and activities - always ending with a quiz at the end of the programme to decide a winner. Members of the teams provide anecdotes and memories of their former classmates, and what they did after the school bell had rung for the last time for them. Some of the contestants have been plumbers, school teachers, and dog trainers, and there are reminiscences about who was the best at different subjects.

== Guests ==
=== Season 1 (2000) ===
(Spring)

- 1: Frode Kyvåg and Nils Arne Eggen
- 2: Arne Hjeltnes and Mia Gundersen
- 3: Kjell Magne Bondevik and Wenche Myhre
- 4: Sven Nordin and Anne Holt
- 5: Ellen Horn and Trond-Viggo Torgersen
- 6: Bjarne Brøndbo and Benedicte Adrian Mouton
- 7: Jahn Teigen and Ingolf Håkon Teigene
- 8: Finn Christian Jagge and Jahn Ivar "Mini" Jakobsen
- 9: Anette Hoff and Geir Kvarme
- 10: Jens Stoltenberg and Kristin Halvorsen

=== Season 2 (2001) ===
(Summer)

- 1: Øystein Sunde and Anne Marie Ottersen
- 2: Kjersti Grini and Tore André Flo
- 3: Bård Tufte Johansen and Harald Eia
- 4: Ingelin Killengreen and Yngvar Numme
- 5: Bjørn Dæhlie and Trond Giske
- 6: Carl I. Hagen and Per-Kristian Foss
- 7: Kristin Clemet and Bjørn Eidsvåg
- 8: Elisabeth Andreassen and Jørn Hoel
- 9: Ingrid Bjørnov and Ole Edvard Antonsen
- 10: Liv Ullmann and Rolv Wesenlund

=== Season 3 (2001) ===
(Autumn)

- 1: Marianne Krogness and Viggo Sandvik
- 2: Kim Haugen and Kjersti Holmen
- 3: Jan Åge Fjørtoft and Bente Skari
- 4: Hans-Wilhelm Steinfeld and Inger Lise Rypdal
- 5: Kjersti Berge and Elisabeth Moberg
- 6: Lise Fjeldstad and Arve Tellefsen
- 7: Tore Strømøy and Mari Maurstad
- 8: John G. Bernander and Trude Mostue
- 9: Nils Johan Semb and Marit Breivik
- 10: Tor Endresen and Anita Skorgan
- 11: Kjell Kristian Rike and Gerhard Heiberg
- 12: Halvdan Sivertsen and Åge Aleksandersen

=== Season 4 (2005) ===
(Summer)

- 1: Robert Stoltenberg and Rune Andersen
  - Shown 15 January 2005
  - Robert Stoltenberg won
- 2: Kari Traa and Petter Solberg
  - Shown 22 January 2005
  - Kari Traa won
- 3: Erna Solberg and Dagfinn Høybråten
  - Shown 29 January
  - Erna Solberg won
- 4: Anne Marit Jacobsen and Harald Heide-Steen Jr.
  - Shown 5 February 2005
  - Anne Marit Jacobsen won
- 5: Åge Hareide and Per Inge Torkelsen
  - Shown 12 February 2005
  - Åge Hareide won
- 6: Siv Jensen and Tommy Steine
  - Shown 26 February 2005
  - Siv Jensen won
- 7: Hilde Hummelvoll and Dag Erik Pedersen
  - Shown 12 March 2005
  - Dag Erik Pedersen won
- 8: Gunn-Rita Dahle Flesjå and Bjarte Hjelmeland
  - Shown 19 March 2005
  - Gunn Rita Dahle won
- 9: Linn Skåber and Dennis Storhøi

=== Season 5 (2005) ===
(Autumn)

- 1: Hilde Lyrån and Åsleik Engmark Shown 17 September 2005
- 2: Egil Olsen and Ole Paus Shown 24 September 2005
- 3: Marit Voldsæter and Petter Stordalen Shown 1 October 2005
- 4: Synnøve Svabø and Dagfinn Lyngbø Shown 15 October 2005
- 5: Marit Bjørgen and Bjørn Einar Romøren
- 6: Henning Berg and Kjetil Rekdal
- 7: Brit Elisabeth Haagensli and Hege Schøyen Shown 12 November 2005
- 8: Lasse Kjus and Kjetil André Aamodt Shown 19 November 2005
- 9: Rune Gokstad and Øystein Bache

=== Season 6 (2008) ===
(Summer)

- 1: Alex Rosén and Åge Sten Nilsen
  - Shown 19 January
  - Åge Sten Nilsen won
- 2: Christine Koht and Klaus Sonstad
  - Shown 26 January
  - Klaus Sonstad won
- 3: Anne B. Ragde and Unni Lindell
  - Shown 3 February
  - Unni Lindell won
- 4: Frode Alnæs and Torhild Sivertsen
  - Shown 16 February
  - Frode Alnæs won
- 5: Gustav Lorentzen and Øystein Dolmen
  - Shown 23 February
  - Gustav Lorentzen won
- 6: Knut Jørgen Røed Ødegaard and Wolfgang Plagge
  - Shown 1 March
  - Wolfgang Plagge won
- 7: Inga Marte Thorkildsen and Saera Khan
  - Shown 8 March
  - Saera Khan won
- 8: Jon Niklas Rønning and Anders Bye
  - Shown 15 March
  - Jon Niklas Rønning won
- 9: Lillestrøm Sportsklubb and SK Brann
  - Special show which is not a class duel, but captains, coaches, and star players of Lillestrøm and Brann meet.
  - Shown 29 March
  - Lillestrøm won

== Behind the scenes ==
- By Gitte Calmeyer and Wenche Solum
- Project leaders: Wenche Solum, Siss Kvamme, Kjerstin Asplund, Eva Marie Gransæter
- Programme produced by NRK with Wegelius TV
- House orchestra: Jon-Willy Rydningen was conductor. With him, he has Joakim Nordin on drums, Rino Johanessen on bass and Bernt Rune Stray on guitar
