= Fjeldstad =

Fjeldstad is a Norwegian surname. Notable Norwegians with the surname include:

- Erik Fjeldstad (1944–2019), ice hockey player
- Jack Fjeldstad (1915–2000), actor and stage producer
- Lise Fjeldstad (born 1939), actress
- Øivin Fjeldstad (1903–1983), conductor and violinist
- Øivin Skappel Fjeldstad (born 1936), banker and politician
- Sveinung Fjeldstad (born 1978), footballer
- Torill Fjeldstad (born 1958), alpine skier
