= Svein Sturla Hungnes =

Norwegian actor, theatre director, and instructor

Svein Sturla Hungnes (born 21 March 1946) is a Norwegian actor, theatre director, and instructor.

Hungnes studied at the Norwegian National Academy of Theatre from 1965 to 1970, and had several small roles at Nationaltheatret during that time. After he had finished with his exams in winter 1970, he made his real debut, when he played tough young boy Joey in the Homecoming by Harold Pinter. He was noticed, and had larger roles by 1972, when he played Osvald in Ibsen's Ghosts and Puck in Shakespeare's A Midsummer Night's Dream.

Hungnes was one of the leading actors at Nationaltheatret in the 1970s and 80s, when he also led many instructional exercises. He was acting coach for, among others, Phaedra, Romeo and Juliet, A Doll's House and The Threepenny Opera (which he directed himself). He directed Hamlet at the Trøndelag Teater, Hedda Gabler at Riksteatret and the Nordahl Grieg biography Nordahl i våre hjerter at Den Nationale Scene. At Oslo Nye Teater he produced many musical successes, including Cabaret, Chicago and My Fair Lady, as well as the Hedda Award winner Who's Afraid of Virginia Woolf?.

Svein Sturla Hungnes has acted in many Norwegian films since the 1960s, of which Kimen, Mors hus, The Telegraphist and Detector are among the best known.

From 1995 to 2007 Hungnes had the title role in the annual performance of Peer Gynt at the Peer Gynt-stemnet in Gudbrandsdalen. In autumn 2007 he was part of the jury of the Norwegian Broadcasting Corporation television programme Drømmerollen.

In 2002 Hungnes was head of Oslo Nye Teater. For his contributions to Norwegian theater, in 2004 he was named a Knight First Class of the Royal Norwegian Order of St. Olav.

In 2009 Hungnes received the Oslo City Culture Award.

== Filmography ==
- 2000: Detector
- 1996: Offshore
- 1993: The Telegraphist
- 1989: Bryllupsfesten
- 1985: Adjø solidaritet
- 1985: Papirfuglen
- 1982: Henrys bakværelse
- 1982: Victoria L
- 1981: Julia Julia
- 1980: Belønningen
- 1980: Life and Death
- 1979: Arven
- 1978: Hvem har bestemt..!?
- 1975: Faneflukt
- 1974: Kimen
- 1974: Mors hus
- 1974: Rape
- 1971: Rødblått paradis
- 1969: Psychedelica Blues
- 1969: Himmel og helvete
- 1969: Faderen
- 1968: Hennes meget kongelige høyhet
