= Knut Husebø =

Norwegian actor (1946–2026)

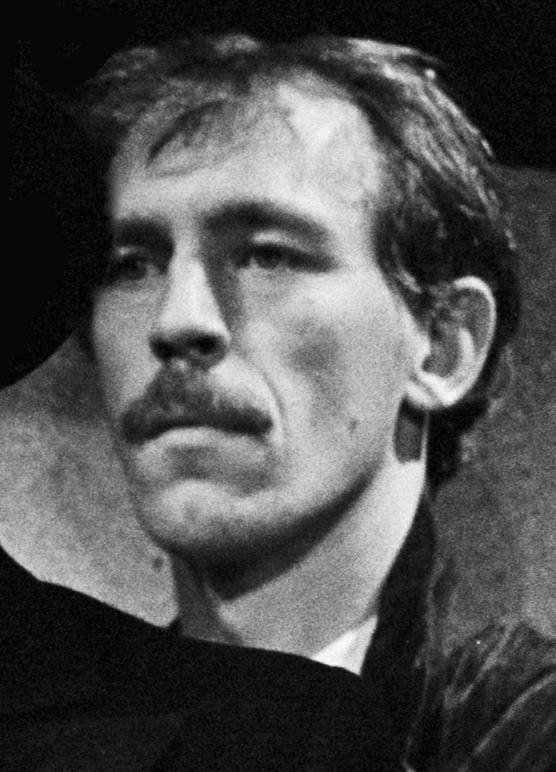
- Born: 10 May 1946; Stavanger, Norway
- Died: 30 May 2026 (aged 80)
- Occupations: Actor; visual artist

Knut Husebø (10 May 1946 – 30 May 2026) was a Norwegian actor and visual artist.

== Life and career ==
Born in Stavanger, Husebø debuted in 1968 in the role Flyndrefanten in the play Taremare by on Den Nationale Scene. He was employed at the Nationaltheatret 1969–1971 and 1975–1986, interrupted by an engagement at the National Theatre 1977–1979 and 1982–1983. Beginning in 1986 he was a freelance actor.

Among the roles Husebø played were Edmund in King Lear, Orsino in the Twelfth Night and the title role in Henrik Ibsen's Catiline. He played the multifaceted Benoni in Fjernsynsteatret's adaptation of Knut Hamsun's novels Benoni and Rosa, and he had one of the leading parts in Per Bronken's television series adaptation of Sigrid Undset's Jenny.

Over the years Husebø's work most prominently was as a visual artist.

Husebø died on 30 May 2026, at the age of 80.

== Select filmography ==
- Cold Lunch (2008)
- Max Manus (2008)
- Morgan Kane: Døden er en ensom jeger (2001)
- Lapin kullan kimallus (1999)
- Trollsyn (1994)
- Bryllupsfesten (1989)
- Apprentice to Murder (1988)
- Adjø Solidaritet (1984)
- Ingenjör Andrées luftfärd (1982)
- Julia Julia (1981)
- Life and Death (1980)
- Oss (1976)
- Faneflukt (1975)
- Knut Formos siste jakt (1973)

== Television ==
- Terra Nova (1984)
- Benoni og Rosa (1973)

== Select theater ==
=== Nationaltheatret ===
- Faderen (1968)
- Dyrene i Hakkebakkeskogen (1969)
- Det store smellet (1969)

=== Riksteatret ===
- Hedda Gabler (1995)

=== Centralteatret ===
- Rocky Horror Show (1977)
- Fantomets glade bryllup (1978)

=== Hålogaland Teater ===
- The Threepenny Opera (1971)
