= Jan Grønli =

Norwegian actor

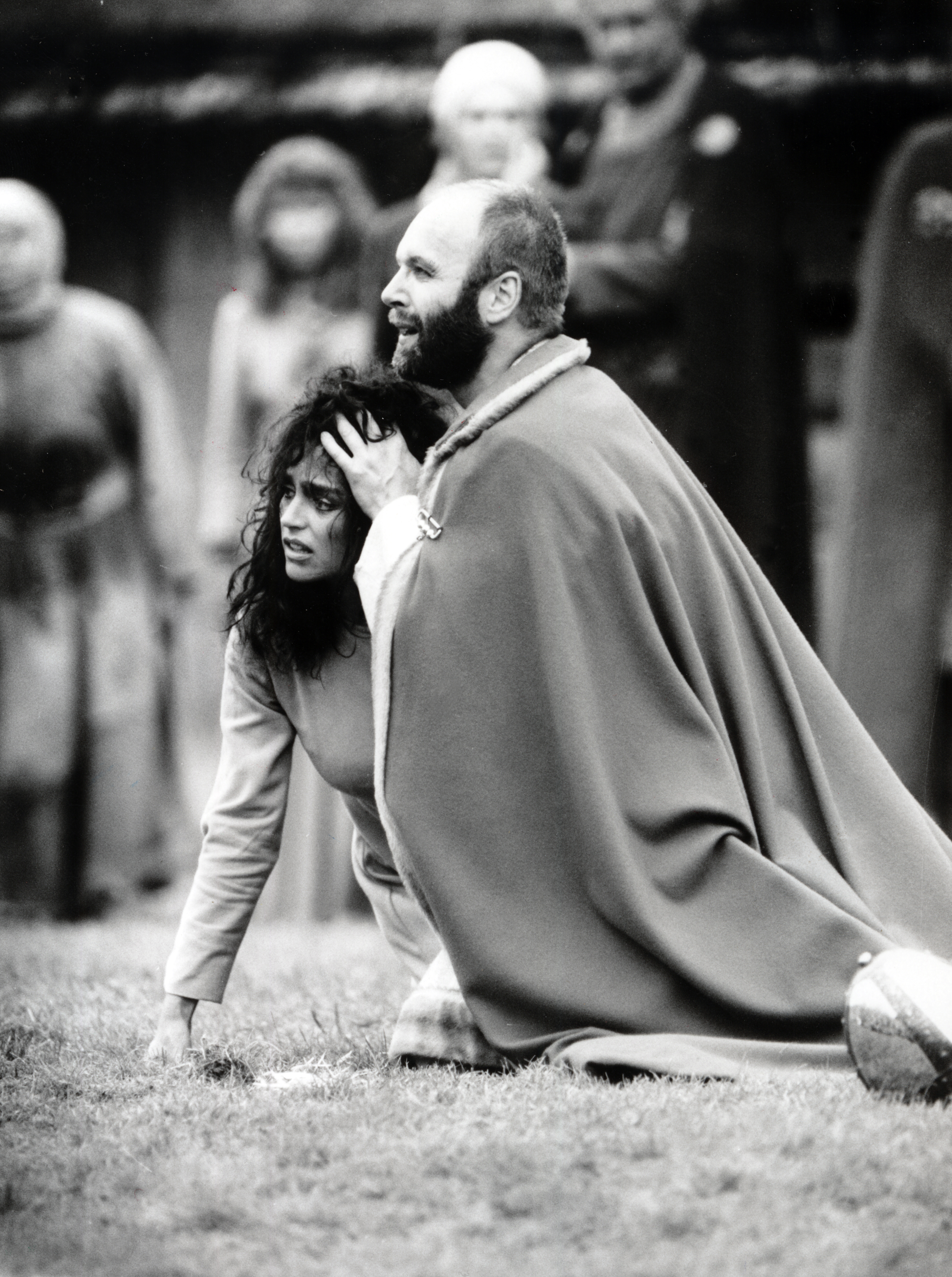
- Jan Grønli as the king in The Saint Olav Drama, 1988
- Born: August 18, 1950 (age 74); Oslo, Norway
- Occupation: Actor

Jan Grønli (born August 18, 1950) is a Norwegian actor. From 1971 to 1991, Grønli was associated with the National Theater in Bergen, the Rogaland Theater, and the National Theater in Oslo. He was employed by the Norwegian Theater in 1991. He is considered Norway's foremost interpreter of Thomas Bernhard's plays.

Grønli has also read several audio books, including Epp by Axel Jensen and Ut og stjæle hester (Out Stealing Horses) by Per Petterson, as well as Jan Guillou's Crusades trilogy.

== Filmography ==
- 1973: Brannen as Jon
- 1992: Svarte pantere as a fur farmer
- 1992: Lakki as Buddha-Man
- 1995: Farlig Farvann as Egil
- 1996: Eremittkrepsen as the father
- 1997: Hotel Oslo as Jon
- 1997: 1996: Pust på meg as Thomas
- 1998: Kineseren as the father
- 2000: Aberdeen as Granbakken
- 2000: De 7 dødssyndene - Fråtseri
- 2001: Morgan Kane - Døden er en ensom jeger as Fyllikk
- 2001: Olsenbandens første kupp as the principal
- 2003: Jonny Vang as Uffe
- 2003: Olsenbanden jr. går under vann as Major Schultze
- 2004: Olsenbanden jr. på rocker'n as Pop-Johansen
- 2005: Drømmen om Norge
- 2005: Ved kongens bord as Anders Arnesen, minister of culture
- 2006: En udødelig mann as Sigvald
- 2006: Olsenbanden jr. på Cirkus as Sigvald Pettersen, the orphanage manager
- 2007: Olsenbanden Jr. og Sølvgruvens hemmelighet as Maximilian von Klem
- 2009: Olsenbanden jr. Det sorte gullet as Engineer Hallandsen
- 2010: Olsenbanden jr. Mestertyvens skatt as Arne
- 2011: Arme riddere as Clausen

== Voice roles ==
- 1995: Dypets ensomhet as the narrator
- 1998: Solan, Ludvig og Gurin med reverompa as coaching inn guest 2
- 2000: 102 Dalmatinere as various voices
- 2001: Operasjon Mjau
- 2001: Atlantis: En forsvunnet verden
- 2001: Småspioner 1
- 2002: Istid as Carl
- 2002: Hvalens sjel
- 2003: Oppdrag Nemo as Brusk
- 2005: Robots as Jack Hammer

== Awards ==
- Hedda Award for outstanding stage performance for the role of Bruscon in Der Theatermacher by Thomas Bernhard at the National Theater in Oslo (2004)
- Aksel Waldemar memorial award (1994)
- NRK Radio Theater's Blå fugl award (1995)
- Aase Bye endowment (1997)
- Hulda Garborg award (2000)
