= Yohan: The Child Wanderer =

- Norwegian theatrical poster
- Directed by: Grete Salomonsen
- Written by: Grete Salomonsen
- Produced by: Bill Dion; Odd G. Iversen; Brett Jacobs; Penelopefilm
- Starring: Robin Pedersen Daniel; Dennis Storhøi; Agnete Haaland; Kris Kristofferson; Alexander Rybak; Morten Abel; Aylar Lie; Jørgen Langhelle; Mathilde Berg; Adam Eftevaag
- Cinematography: Odd Hynnekleiv
- Edited by: Tore Hynnekleiv
- Music by: Ragnar Bjerkreim
- Distributed by: Nordisk Film
- Release date: March 26, 2010
- Country: Norway
- Language: Norwegian
- Budget: 35 million NOK (est.)
- Box office: $1,330,735

Yohan: The Child Wanderer (Norwegian: Yohan – Barnevandrer) is a 2010 family film directed by Grete Salomonsen. The film is based on true stories about child wanderers in Norway.

The film was made simultaneously in two languages, English and Norwegian. It was scheduled to be distributed to 30 countries. It premiered in Norway on March 26, 2010. As of August 2011, it still has not been released in the United States. Yohan is the most expensive children's film ever made in Norway. The film features 100 specific roles, 400 to 500 extras and around 200 animals. Yohan was filmed in Norway and also California, US in order to shoot scenes with wolves. These scenes were directed by Hollywood animal trainer Steve Martin.

== Production ==
Penelopefilm in Kristiansand, Norway started to work on the film in 1990, researching historical facts regarding the child wanderings. In 1991, the company interviewed two remaining child wanderers, living in the United States. They were then 99 and 100 years old.

== Cast ==
Role	Actor/Actress
Yohan Aamot	Robin Pedersen Daniel
Johannes Aamot	Dennis Storhøi
Marta Aamot	Agnete Haaland
Adult Yohan	Kris Kristofferson
Levi	Alexander Rybak
Anna	Mathilde Berg
Raya (Stepmother of Levi)	Aylar Lie
Teacher	Morten Abel
Nome	Jørgen Langhelle
Olai	Adam Eftevaag
Yussuf (Stepfather of Levi)	Morten Harket
Ferryman	Alejandro Fuentes
Singer	Carola Häggkvist

== Music ==
The film's theme song is performed by Carola Häggkvist.
