= Torgeir Schjerven =

Norwegian author and lyric poet (born 1954)

Torgeir Schjerven (born 28 August 1954) is a Norwegian author and lyric poet. Schjerven trained as a visual artist. He has worked as an actor in such films as Lasse & Geir (1976, directed by Svend Wam and Petter Vennerød) and Det tause flertall (The Silent Majority, 1977, directed by Svend Wam).

In 1995, Schjerven was one of the finalists for the Nordic Council's Literature Prize for the novel Omvei til Venus.

Torgeir Schjerven is married to the author Inger Elisabeth Hansen.

== Bibliography ==
=== Poetry ===
- Vekk – poetry (1981)
- Nettenes melk – poetry (1986)
- Tanker og andre personlige bedrifter – poetry (1989)
- En nåde uten mål – poetry (1998)
- I anledning dagen – poetry (2002) (An oral edition published in 2003 was read by the author himself.)
- Den stødige tilstundelsen av jubel i virkelig trist musikk – poetry (2006)

=== Novels ===
- I det blodige blå – novel (1984)
- Omvei til Venus – novel (1994)

=== Children's book ===
- 1992 – Hugo og de tre som forsvant, children's book written together with Inger Elisabeth Hansen, and illustrated by Hilde Kramer

== Awards ==
- 1986 – Hartvig Kirans minnepris
- 1994 – Norwegian Critics Prize for Literature, for Omvei til Venus
- 1995 – Nominated for the Nordic Council's Literature Prize for Omvei til Venus
- 2002 – Halldis Moren Vesaas Prize
- 2005 – Norwegian Academy Prize in memory of Thorleif Dahl
