= Hotel St. Pauli =

- Directed by: Svend Wam
- Written by: Petter Vennerød; Svend Wam
- Based on: Jord! by Erland Kiøsterud
- Produced by: Svend Wam
- Starring: John Ege; Amanda Ooms; Øyvin Bang Berven
- Cinematography: Philip Øgaard
- Production company: Mefistofilm AS
- Release date: 3 March 1988 (Norway)
- Running time: 122 minutes
- Country: Norway
- Languages: Norwegian; Swedish

Hotel St. Pauli is a 1988 Norwegian drama film by Svend Wam, based upon the novel Jord! by Erland Kiøsterud.

The movie is set in Copenhagen, Hamburg and the roads in between. It is about sex and violence in the Hamburg red light district of St. Pauli.

== Plot ==
Jor tries to make a living as an artist. For the time being, he and his girlfriend Gerda have to live off her income as a prostitute. When the young Morgan comes into their life, the relationship between the three becomes difficult, with Gerda and Morgan eventually fleeing.

== Cast ==
- Øyvin Bang Berven as Morgan
- John Ege as Jor
- Amanda Ooms as Gerda
- Sossen Krohg as Morgan's mother
- Jöns Andersson as Priest
- Jorunn Kjellsby as theatre manager
- Lasse Lindtner as Jor on stage
- Petter Nome as radio voice
- Linn Stokke as Gerda on stage
- Ingrid van Bergen as hotel manager

== Production ==
When it came out, this film caused a debate due to its unsimulated sex scenes. Amanda Ooms said she didn't regret to have played in this movie: "No not at all. I did my job well there, but there are scene in which I had full sex and some other strange things. It's a movie on the border. It's a pretty sex-based movie. It is a little difficult to explain to my own children why I took that role. I guess I did it just because I got paid well," she said.
