= Det var en gang (film) =

- Directed by: Ketil Jakobsen
- Written by: Beata Krupska; Ketil Jakobsen
- Starring: Morten Faldaas; Brit Elisabeth Haagensli; Sossen Krohg; Lasse Lindtner; Mari Maurstad; Toralv Maurstad; Katja Medbøe; Guri Schanke
- Narrated by: Henki Kolstad
- Release date: August 19, 1994
- Running time: 62 minutes
- Country: Norway
- Language: Norwegian

Det var en gang (English: Once upon a time) is a 1994 Norwegian animated film directed by Ketil Jakobsen. It is narrated by Henki Kolstad, and contains the voices of several Norwegian actors. The film contains three of the folk tales collected by Asbjørnsen and Moe: The Little Boys who met the Trolls in Hedal Forest, Three Lemons and The Twelve Wild Ducks.
