= List of submissions to the 55th Academy Awards for Best Foreign Language Film =

1982 Best Foreign Language Film submissions

Highlights
- Oscar winner: (Spain) Begin the Beguine
- Submissions: 25
- Debuts: 1

This is a list of submissions to the 55th Academy Awards for Best Foreign Language Film. The Academy Award for Best Foreign Language Film was created in 1956 by the Academy of Motion Picture Arts and Sciences to honour non-English-speaking films produced outside the United States. The award is handed out annually, and is accepted by the winning film's director, although it is considered an award for the submitting country as a whole. Countries are invited by the Academy to submit their best films for competition according to strict rules, with only one film being accepted from each country.

For the 55th Academy Awards, twenty-five films were submitted in the category Academy Award for Best Foreign Language Film. Nicaragua submitted a film for the first time. The five nominated films came from France, Nicaragua, Sweden, Soviet Union and Spain.

Spain won for the first time for Begin the Beguine by José Luis Garci.

== Submissions ==
Submitting country	Film title used in nomination	Original title	Language(s)	Director(s)	Result
Algeria	Sandstorm	Vent de sable / رياح رملية	French, Arabic	Mohammed Lakhdar-Hamina	Not nominated
Argentina	Last Days of the Victim	Últimos días de la víctima	Spanish	Adolfo Aristarain	Not nominated
Belgium	Minuet	Menuet	Dutch	Lili Rademakers	Not nominated
Bulgaria	Khan Asparoukh	Хан Аспарух	Bulgarian	Ludmil Staikov	Not nominated
Canada	Wild Flowers	Les fleurs sauvages	French	Jean Pierre Lefebvre	Not nominated
Czechoslovakia	The Assistant	Pomocnik	Slovak	Zoro Zahon	Not nominated
Denmark	Tree of Knowledge	Kundskabens træ	Danish	Nils Malmros	Not nominated
France	Clean Slate	Coup de Torchon	French	Bertrand Tavernier	Nominated
West Germany	Fitzcarraldo		German, Spanish, Asháninka, English	Werner Herzog	Not nominated
Greece	Angel	Άγγελος	Greek	Giorgos Katakouzinos	Not nominated
Hungary	Time Stands Still	Megáll az idö	Hungarian, Russian	Péter Gothár	Not nominated
Iceland	Inter Nos	Okkar á milli: Í hita og þunga dagsins	Icelandic	Hrafn Gunnlaugsson	Not nominated
Israel	Hamsin	חמסין	Hebrew, Arabic	Daniel Wachsmann	Not nominated
Italy	The Night of the Shooting Stars	La Notte di San Lorenzo	Italian	Paolo Taviani and Vittorio Taviani	Not nominated
Japan	Onimasa	鬼龍院花子の生涯	Japanese	Hideo Gosha	Not nominated
Netherlands	The Cool Lakes of Death	Van de koele meren des doods	Dutch, French	Nouchka van Brakel	Not nominated
Nicaragua	Alsino and the Condor	Alsino y el cóndor	Spanish, English	Miguel Littín	Nominated
Norway	Victoria L	Leve sitt liv	Norwegian	Petter Vennerød and Svend Wam	Not nominated
Portugal	Francisca		Portuguese	Manoel de Oliveira	Not nominated
Soviet Union	Private Life	Частная жизнь	Russian	Yuli Raizman	Nominated
Spain	Begin the Beguine	Volver a empezar	Spanish	José Luis Garci	Won Academy Award
Sweden	The Flight of the Eagle	Ingenjör Andrées luftfärd	Swedish, French	Jan Troell	Nominated
Switzerland	Yol		Turkish, Kurdish	Şerif Gören and Yılmaz Güney	Not nominated
Taiwan	The Battle for the Republic of China	辛亥双十	Mandarin	Ding Shan Xi	Not nominated
Yugoslavia	The Smell of Quinces	Miris dunja	Serbo-Croatian	Mirza Idrizović	Not nominated

== Notes ==
- Switzerland was allowed to submit their Palme d'Or-winning entry Yol, a film in Turkish by a pair of Turkish directors. The film had been banned for political content at home, and was smuggled into Switzerland and edited in Paris.
