= Kamilla and the Thief II =

Kamilla and the Thief II (English version) Kamilla og tyven - Del 2 (Norwegian version)
- Directed by: Grete Salomonsen
- Written by: Grete Salomonsen
- Starring: Veronika Flåt; Dennis Storhøi; Agnete Haaland; Morten Harket
- Cinematography: Odd Hynnekleiv
- Edited by: Howard Lanning
- Music by: Ragnar Bjerkreim
- Distributed by: United International Pictures
- Release date: 1989
- Running time: 97 min
- Country: Norway
- Language: Norwegian

Kamilla and the Thief II (Norwegian: Kamilla og Tyven II) is a Norwegian family movie from 1989 directed by Grete Salomonsen and produced by her husband Odd Hynnekleiv. It is a sequel to Kamilla and the Thief and is a loose adaption of another novel by Kari Vinje.

== Plot ==
The sequel to the film begins with Sebastian's arrest. Shortly thereafter, the criminal Joakim Jensen is arrested and put in a prison cell together with Sebastian. Kamilla is very worried about Sebastian and one day she goes to visit him in prison. After the visit, her sister Sofie is no longer afraid of Sebastian and allows Kamilla to write him letters.

Peter still makes fun of Kamilla and claims that Sebastian is a thief. Kamilla contradicts him and explains that Sebastian has become a child of God. The teacher explains to the children that there are many thieves even in school and that there are different ways of stealing (stealing secrets, stealing self-confidence). But the teacher also explains that even if people have done wrong, if they are sincerely sorry, they can go to heaven.

At Christmas, Sebastian is released from prison on parole and goes to see Kamilla and Sofie. At the same time, Joakim Jensen breaks out of prison again. Sebastian fixes Kamilla's kite and tells his story to the other kids. The children befriend him, but many of the adult villagers are still skeptical and unfriendly towards Sebastian. Only Sofie, Kamilla and the other children believe in Sebastian.

When Sebastian, Sofie and the children celebrate Peter's birthday, the sisters Maren and Pauline meet Joakim Jensen, who is hiding in old Simon's hut and then ties up the two girls and holds them captive. Sebastian, Peter and Kamilla go in search of the two and observe what is happening through a window. While Kamilla gets reinforcements, Peter and Sebastian storm into the hut. Peter manages to free the two girls while Sebastian fights with Joakim. When Sebastian stumbles over a carpet, falls and remains unconscious, Joakim Jensen takes to his heels. During his escape he knocks over a candlestick, whereupon the curtains catch fire and a short time later the hut is on fire. Christoffer manages to pull Sebastian out of the burning hut at the last second.

Sofie and Kamilla take Sebastian in and take care of him. When he finally regains consciousness, the two take him outside. There, all the villagers are busy rebuilding the hut for Sebastian.

== See also ==
- Kamilla and the Thief
