= Dagny (film) =

- Directed by: Haakon Sandøy
- Written by: Aleksander Ścibor-Rylski
- Narrated by: Lise Fjeldstad; Daniel Olbrychski; Per Oscarsson; Nils Ole Oftebro
- Cinematography: Zygmunt Samosiuk
- Edited by: Zofia Dwornik
- Music by: Arne Nordheim
- Release date: 26 January 1977 (Norway)
- Running time: 88 minutes
- Countries: Norway, Poland
- Languages: Norwegian, Polish, German

Dagny is a 1977 Norwegian-Polish historical drama film directed by Haakon Sandøy. It is narrated by, among others, Lise Fjeldstad, Daniel Olbrychski, Per Oscarsson and Nils Ole Oftebro. The subject of the film is the Norwegian writer Dagny Juel (Fjeldstad), and her relationship to such men as Stanisław Przybyszewski (Olbrychski), Edvard Munch (Oftebro) and August Strindberg (Oscarsson).

== Plot ==
Dagny Juell, the daughter of a doctor, leaves Kongsvinger for Berlin to study music, and becomes the mistress of famous painter Edvard Munch.

== Cast ==
- Lise Fjeldstad - Dagny Juel-Przybyszewska
- Daniel Olbrychski - Stanisław Przybyszewski
- Per Oscarsson - August Strindberg
- Nils Ole Oftebro - Edvard Munch
- Maciej Englert - Stanisław Korab-Brzozowski
- Olgierd Łukaszewicz - Wladyslaw Emeryk
- Elzbieta Karkoszka - Marta Foerder
- Barbara Wrzesinska - Jadwiga Kasprowiczowa
- Jerzy Bińczycki - Jan Kasprowicz
