= Sebastian (1995 film) =

1995 Swedish film directed by Svend Wam

- Directed by: Svend Wam
- Written by: Per Knutsen (novel); Hansi Mandoki
- Produced by: Lars Kolvig; Hansi Mandoki; Petter Vennerød
- Starring: Hampus Björck; Nicolai Cleve Broch; Ewa Fröling; Helge Jordal; Rebecka Hemse; Emil Lindroth
- Release date: 1995

Sebastian (alternative title När alla vet) is a 1995 Swedish film based on a novel by Per Knutsen that chronicles a teenage boy's coming out experience. It is directed by Svend Wam.

== Plot ==
16-year-old Sebastian (Hampus Björck) has parents and a circle of friends; he does well in school, looks good, and leads a happy life—or at least that is what everyone thinks. Secretly, he has been in love with his best friend, a hunky Ulf (Nicolai Cleve Broch).

One evening, after some playful frolicking around with Ulf, Sebastian plants a kiss on Ulf's lips, not exactly to the latter's delight. Being sexually rejected in this way throws Sebastian into an even deeper depression about his sexuality. He refuses to discuss these issues with his parents, and only after a long talk with a female friend of his, who is also in love with Ulf and guesses correctly what Sebastian's problem could be, he opens up to his family and friends, only to find that it is not all that problematic to them.

Even the coming out to Ulf, which he anticipated to be very painful, turns out to be not so bad and actually takes a comical turn when Ulf admits to having had a homosexual experience himself some time ago. In the end, basically nothing has changed, except that Sebastian no longer has to waste energy guarding his secret and can instead concentrate on being happy, having fun with his friends, and perhaps finding a real boyfriend someday.

== Cast ==
- Hampus Björck as Sebastian
- Nicolai Cleve Broch as Ulf
- Ewa Fröling as Mother
- Helge Jordal as Father
- Rebecka Hemse as Lisbeth
- Lena Olander as Linda
- Emil Lindroth as Jan
- Karin Hagås as Inga
- Mira Mandoki as Lisa
- Stig Torstensson as Fyllie
- Sara Alström as Girl #1
- Johanna Sällström as Girl #2
- Bård Torgersen as Vendor

== Reactions ==
In critical reviews, Sebastian is frequently dismissed as escapist gay youth fare that does not address any deeper issues. However, as the movie correctly points out, the hardest part of the coming out process is fighting inner uncertainty and self-doubt. And even if (as in the case of Sebastian) a coming out is comparatively eventless, the inner resolve required to take that step stays the same.
