= Øivin Skappel Fjeldstad =

Norwegian banker and politician (born 1936)

Øivin Skappel Fjeldstad (born 6 February 1936) is a Norwegian banker and politician for the Conservative Party.

== Personal life ==
He was born in Oslo as a son of conductor Øivin Fjeldstad (1903–1983) and housewife Julie Skappel (1910–1996). He is a brother of actress Lise Fjeldstad and brother-in-law of Per Sunderland.

== Early life and professional career ==
He finished secondary education in 1955, commerce school in 1956, officer training in 1957 and graduated from the Norwegian School of Economics with the siv.øk. degree in 1961. He chaired the student society there in 1960. He was a consultant for Dalen Portland Cementfabrikk from 1961 to 1965, office manager for Årdal og Sunndal Verk from 1965 to 1968, financial director for Follum Fabrikker from 1968 to 1978 and Akers Mekaniske Verksted from 1978 to 1981. He then started a banking career in Bergen Bank in 1982, being promoted to vice chief executive in 1983 and later serving as vice chief executive in Den norske Bank from 1990 to 1993. From 1993 to 1997 he was the chief executive of Den norske Bank Luxembourg, and from 1998 to 2003 he was a senior adviser in Landesbank Schleswig-Holstein.

He has chaired Kistefos Træsliberi from 1982 to 1986 (board member 1981 to 1994), Nord & Syd Kredittforsikring from 1986 to 1988 (board member since 1983), DnB Investment Fund SICAV from 1987 to 1999, Atlantic Securities ASA from 1998 to 2000 and the Anders Jahre Humanitarian Foundation from 1999. He was a board member of Ringerikes Sparebank (1978–1982), Bergens Mekaniske Verksteder (1978–1982), Aker Trøndelag (1978–1982), Stord Verft (1978–1982), Nylands Verksted (1978–1982), Fjerndata 1979–1982), Nortank (1979–1982), Trajan (1979–1982), Norgeskreditt (1985–1992), Deutsch-Skandinavische Bank (1985–1993), Viul Tresliperi (1987–1997), Den norske Bank Luxembourg (1992–1998), Greenfield Holding (2000–2004), Fred. Olsen Energy (2002–), Dextra Musica (2005–2007) and AL industrier (2005–). He was a supervisory council member of Det Norske Luftfartsselskap (1984–1997) (chair since 1986) and Verdipapirsentralen (1985–1995), corporate council member of Follum Fabrikker (1973–1980 and 1985–1988) and Tofte Industrier (1983–1985). In the cultural life, he chaired the council of the Oslo Philharmonic from 1984 to 1996.

== Political career ==
As he moved around in Norway, he was a member of the municipal council of Høyanger Municipality from 1967-1968 and also on the municipal council of Ringerike Municipality from 1975-1987. He chaired the local party chapter from 1975 to 1979. He was elected as a deputy representative to the Parliament of Norway from Buskerud in 1981. From October 1981 to January 1982 he met regularly in Parliament, filling in for Mona Røkke who was a part of Willoch's First Cabinet. In total he was present during 187 days of parliamentary session.
