= Lakki (film) =

- Directed by: Svend Wam
- Written by: Svend Wam
- Based on: Per Knutsen's novel Gutten som kunne fly (1988)
- Produced by: Petter Vennerød
- Starring: Anders Borchgrevink; Nina Gunke; Bjørn Skagestad; Jorunn Kjellsby; Jan Grønli; Henrik Mestad
- Edited by: Inge-Lise Langfeldt
- Music by: Svein Gundersen
- Release date: March 19, 1992
- Running time: 102 minutes
- Country: Norway
- Language: Norwegian

Lakki (Lakki ... The Boy Who Could Fly) is a Norwegian drama film from 1992 directed by Svend Wam and produced by Petter Vennerød—a collaboration known as Wam og Vennerød. The film is based on Per Knutsen's 1988 novel Gutten som kunne fly (The Boy Who Could Fly). Wam was nominated for the Amanda Award for the screenplay.

== Plot ==
The story presents the life of 14-year-old Lakki, who dreams himself away from an insecure existence. Life consists of his party-crazy mother, his self-absorbed father, his violent high school teacher, and the pedophile Buddha-Man. Lakki often thinks of the time when his parents lived together and life was good. But even this joy was not untainted. He also remembers his insane grandfather, from whom he inherited his sweater. When Lakki is alone, he imagines that wings have begun to grow on his back so he can fly away from this painful world. He starts experimenting with drugs with the LSD seller Tim, and one day he starts hallucinating that wings are growing on his back, and he has to decide if he wants to escape or stay where he is. When Lakki comes home to his mother one day, he discovers that she has locked herself in her room and tried to commit suicide. Lakki starts chopping his way through the door with an ax. He eventually faints from exhaustion. The next day, he decides to burn his grandfather's sweater, which causes his wings to fall off. He then goes to the hospital and forgives his mother for what she has done.

== Reception ==
The film was poorly received by both the press and audiences. Low audience numbers led to it being removed from the marquees after four days in all Norwegian cities except Oslo. The poor reception resulted in the film being reworked and relaunched under the title Gutten som kunne fly (The Boy Who Could Fly). This version received a somewhat better reception from critics, but the audience response was poor once again. Lakki is considered one of the least successful films by Wam and Vennerød.

== Cast ==
- Anders Borchgrevink as Lakki
- Nina Gunke as the mother
- Bjørn Skagestad as the father
- Jorunn Kjellsby as Siss, the mother's friend
- Gabriel Paaske as Tim
- Øyvin Bang Berven as "Tarzan" the gym teacher
- Jan Grønli as Buddha-Man
- Stian Bonnevie Arntzen as Lakki as a seven-year-old
- Henrik Mestad as a dangerous man
- Ivar Tindberg as Eddie
- Anders Jacobsen as Musketeer
