= Brannen (film) =

- Directed by: Haakon Sandøy
- Written by: Haakon Sandøy
- Based on: Tarjei Vesaas's novel Brannen
- Starring: Jan Grønli; Unn Vibeke Hol; Bonne Gauguin; Kjell Stormoen; Liliane Naumik; Eva von Hanno; Bjarne Andersen
- Cinematography: Zygmunt Samosiuk
- Edited by: Edith Toreg
- Music by: Eyvind Solås
- Distributed by: Kommunenes filmcentral
- Release date: October 1, 1973
- Running time: 75 minutes
- Country: Norway
- Language: Norwegian

Brannen (The Fire) is a Norwegian film from 1973. The film is based on Tarjei Vesaas's novel Brannen. Haakon Sandøy directed the film and Jan Grønli played the lead role. Unn Vibeke Hol played the girl in the film. Nils Vogt made his film debut in Brannen.

== Plot ==
The film is about a young boy that lives alone in a modern housing complex. He has a small room with a telephone that rings more or less constantly. When he picks up the phone, he only hears a busy signal. Eventually, he flees the apartment block in panic. The boy lets himself be led by different people that appear completely unexpectedly. He gets involved in a search team looking for a young girl. When the search crew is completely exhausted after a few days, the boy finds the girl. The film has a surreal feel.

== Background ==
Brannen is based on one of Tarjei Vesaas's most unusual novels. The film's plot and form of expression are largely true to the novel. The Norwegian Media Authority described the film as: "a young boy's nightmare-like experiences and encounter with strange fates on his journey."

== Cast ==
- Jan Grønli as Jon
- Bonne Gauguin as the woman
- Unn Vibeke Hol as the girl
- Kjell Stormoen as the man sawing wood
- Liliane Naumik as the fugitive
- Eva von Hanno as the waitress
- Bjarne Andersen as the man on the bench
- Svein Berglia as the boy
- Frimann Falck Clausen as the boss
- Torgeir Fonnlid as the gravel driver
- Lars Gåsdal as the old man
- Vegard Hall as the wise one
- Frank Iversen as a porter
- Lars Andreas Larssen as a porter
- Svein Moen as the driver
- Øyvind Øyen as a friend
- Nils Sletta as a friend
- Nils Vogt as a young man
- Kåre Wicklund as the father
