= Lasse Lindtner =

Norwegian actor

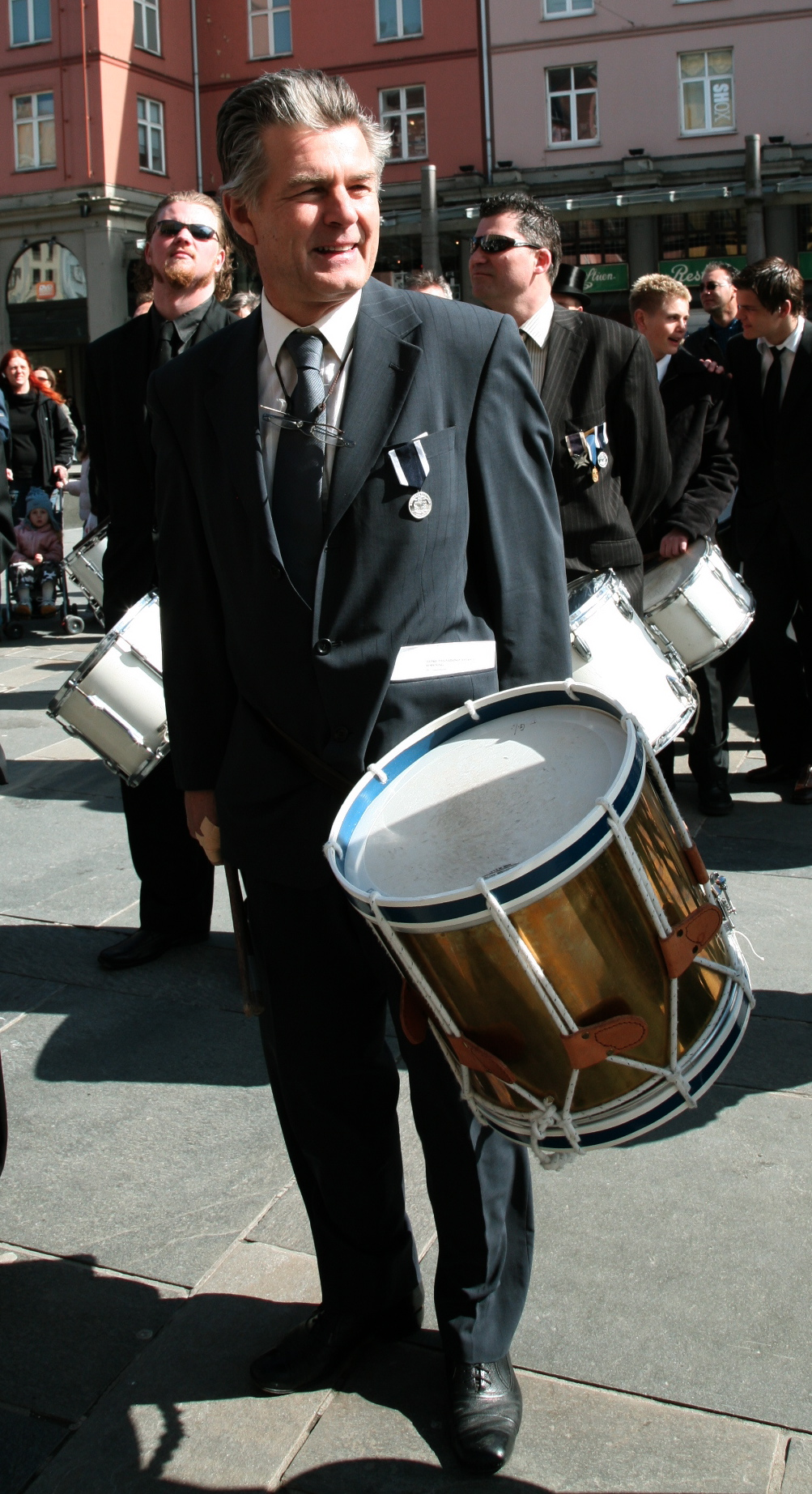
- Lasse Lindtner during the celebration of the 150th anniversary of the Nygaard Battalion in 2007
- Born: March 7, 1955 (age 70); Bergen, Norway
- Occupation: Actor
- Spouse: Anne Marie Ottersen

Lars Johan Lindtner, known as Lasse Lindtner (born March 7, 1955, in Bergen) is a Norwegian actor.

== Career ==
Lindtner is associated with the National Theater and previously worked at the Trøndelag Theater. Before this, he was a well-known actor with the Norwegian Broadcasting Corporation's TV theater department (Norwegian: Fjernsynsteatret). In radio theater with the Norwegian Broadcasting Corporation he made his mark in the role of the detective Knut Gribb.

He has also played roles in film and television. He had his film debut in 1985, and since then has appeared in various films, including Drømmeslottet (1986), Cross My Heart and Hope to Die (1986), and An Enemy of the People. On television he is known from series such as Vestavind, Familiesagaen De syv søstre, Vazelina Hjulkalender, and Ved kongens bord. Starting in 2002, he played one of the main roles in the situation comedy Holms on TV 2. Starting in fall 2006, he appeared in the new lead role of businessman Magnus Falsen in the soap opera Hotel Cæsar on TV 2.

Lindtner has also served as a Buekorps signal drummer for the Nygaard Battalion. He has also recorded a number of audio book versions for the crime novel series featuring Varg Veum.

== Family ==
Lindtner is the son of the actor Lothar Lindtner and the brother of the politician Per Lothar Lindtner. He is married to Anne Marie Ottersen.

== Filmography ==
- Beauty and the Beast (1991): Beast, dubbed voice
- An Enemy of the People (2005): Aslaksen
- Gurin with the Foxtail (1998): voices: Crow 1 / Crow 2 / Farmer
- Weekend (1998)
- Gåten Knut Hamsun (1996): Christian Gierløff
- Wives III (1996): Fredrik
- Once Upon a Time (1994): dubbed voice
- Cross My Heart and Hope to Die (1994): Ane's father
- The Buick: Big Boys Don't Cry (1991): Ken
- Wayfarers (1990): Skaaro
- The Wedding Party (1989): Alf
- Hotel St. Pauli (1988): Jor on stage
- The Dream Castle (1986): Anders
- Farewell Illusions (1985): Helge
- Burning Flowers (1985): record salesman

=== TV ===
- Anno: narrator (seasons 1–2, 2015–16)
- Kodenavn Hunter (season 2) (2008)
- Hotel Cæsar: Magnus Falsen (2007–08)
- Ved kongens bord (2005) (miniseries): Einar Tangen, secretary
- Fox Grønland: Johnny Strømberg (two episodes, 2003)
- Holms (2002–03): Dr. Jørgen Holm (unknown episodes)
- Vazelina hjulkalender (2000) (miniseries): Hans-Fredrik
- Familiesagaen de syv søstre (1996): Erling Tofte (unknown episodes, 1998–2000)
- Gåten Knut Hamsun (1996) (miniseries): Christian Gierløff
- Amalies jul (1995) (miniseries): chimney sweep
- Vestavind (1994) (miniseries): Hallvard Nedrebø
- Skal det vere ein dans? (1986) (TV theater department): Tobben
