= Tears of Gaza =

- Film poster
- Directed by: Vibeke Løkkeberg
- Release dates: September 10, 2010 (Toronto); October 4, 2010 (Norway)
- Running time: 90 minutes
- Country: Norway
- Language: Norwegian

Tears of Gaza is a 2010 Norwegian anti-war documentary concerning the Gaza War as seen through the eyes of a group of Palestinian children, and was directed by Vibeke Løkkeberg.

The film is based on the imagery taken by people themselves in Gaza while the war continued, with some additional material from the few foreign journalists who were present while the conflict unfolded. Løkkeberg was not present in Gaza during the war.

== Screenings, awards ==
In 2011 the film was shown for an Israeli audience in Jerusalem Film Festival.

Tears of Gaza received the Gold Award under the Gaza Film Festival and the prize money from this award was presented to the Palestinian children, who had been in the film.

The film received the Human Rights Award (Public Liberties and Human Rights Award) for best feature film in Al Jazeera International Documentary Festival in Doha in April 2011.

== Reviews ==
“Few antiwar films register with the disturbing immediacy and visceral terror of "Tears of Gaza"...
Almost purely observational, "Tears" doesn't take sides as much as obliterate politics: The wounded parents carrying maimed children are not in uniform, and the bullet holes in the 2-year-olds did not arrive by accident...
The inherent cruelty of so much of the action, committed against civilians with very little infrastructure, services or commercial goods, much less equipment to fight fires, comes through loud and clear...
In any event, what's shown is a revelation, except of course in Gaza...
Production values are good overall, but the cinematography is the standout...”

— John Anderson in Variety
