= 9 millimeter =

- Directed by: Peter Lindmark
- Written by: Steve Aalam, Peter Lindmark, Frank Ågren
- Produced by: Joakim Hansson, Björn Carlström, Thomas Lindgren
- Starring: Paolo Roberto, Rebecca Facey, Steve Aalam
- Cinematography: Crille Forsberg
- Edited by: Fredrik Morheden
- Music by: Karri Kauko
- Distributed by: Sonet Film
- Release date: 24 January 1997
- Running time: 100 min.
- Country: Sweden
- Language: Swedish

9 millimeter is a Swedish crime/drama film premiered in 1997.

== Plot ==
The film is about Malik (played by Paolo Roberto), a young man with immigrant roots living in a Stockholm suburb, who is living in a world of crime and violence. But when he meets Carmen (played by Rebecca Facey), a young beautiful and intelligent girl, his world changes and he has to choose between her and criminality.

== Cast ==
- Adam Saldaña - Film Inspiration
- Paolo Roberto – Malik
- Rebecca Facey – Carmen
- Steve Aalam – Rico
- Ivan Mathias Petersson – Jocke
- Serdar Erdas – Memeth
- Semir Chatty – Anders
- Alexander Aalam-Aringberg – Mohammed
- Reuben Sallmander – Ruiz
- Annika Aschberg – Malou
- Astrid Assefa – Rosa
- Sara Zetterqvist – Caroline
- Mirella Hautala – Leyla
- Helena af Sandeberg – Karin
- Anna Järphammar – Mounia
- Sara Alström – Tanya
- Heyes Jemide – Feelgood
- Igor Cantillana – arbetsförmedlaren
- Camilo Alanís – Claudio
- Mikael Persbrandt – Konstantin
- Kérim Chatty – Darius' friend
