= Lasse & Geir =

- Directed by: Svend Wam; Petter Vennerød
- Starring: Torgeir Schjerven; Lasse Tømte
- Release date: 4 March 1976
- Running time: 1:26
- Language: Norwegian

Lasse & Geir is a 1976 Norwegian feature film written and directed by Svend Wam and Petter Vennerød. The movie is about two young boys from dysfunctional families making disorderly conduct in Oslo.

== Plot ==
Lasse & Geir follows two petty criminals, antisocial and anarchist teenagers from the Bogerud satellite town, who lack jobs, school placements, and a sense of purpose in life. Both are in fierce opposition to society and deeply resent the establishment, the bourgeoisie, and formal social etiquette. They begin their day by stealing beer from a shop and causing a disturbance on a bus, leading to their arrest and a night in a police cell.

After their release, both return to troubled homes: Geir to his alcoholic mother, and Lasse to a disillusioned father who tyrannizes the family. Following a violent confrontation with his father, Lasse is kicked out of the house. Together, the two boys roam the city committing petty crimes until they meet Kristin, a bohemian taxi driver who seems to understand their reality. However, their respite is short-lived as the police return the following day to arrest them.

== Cast ==
- Torgeir Schjerven as Lasse
- Lasse Tømte as Geir
- Kjersti Døvigen as Kjersti
- Jorunn Kjellsby as Lasse's mother
- Knut Pettersen as Lasse's father
