= Abort (film) =

1970 Norwegian Drama

- Directed by: Vibeke Løkkeberg
- Written by: Halvor Elvik; Vibeke Løkkeberg
- Release date: 1972
- Country: Norway
- Language: Norwegian

Abort (English: Abortion) is a 1972 Norwegian drama film directed by Vibeke Løkkeberg. It follows a young girl from the moment she discovers that she is pregnant, to the point where a doctor makes the decision about whether she is granted an abortion.

== Plot ==
A young girl gets pregnant, and decides to apply for abortion. We follow her until the application is answered.
