= Øystein Bache =

Norwegian comedian and actor

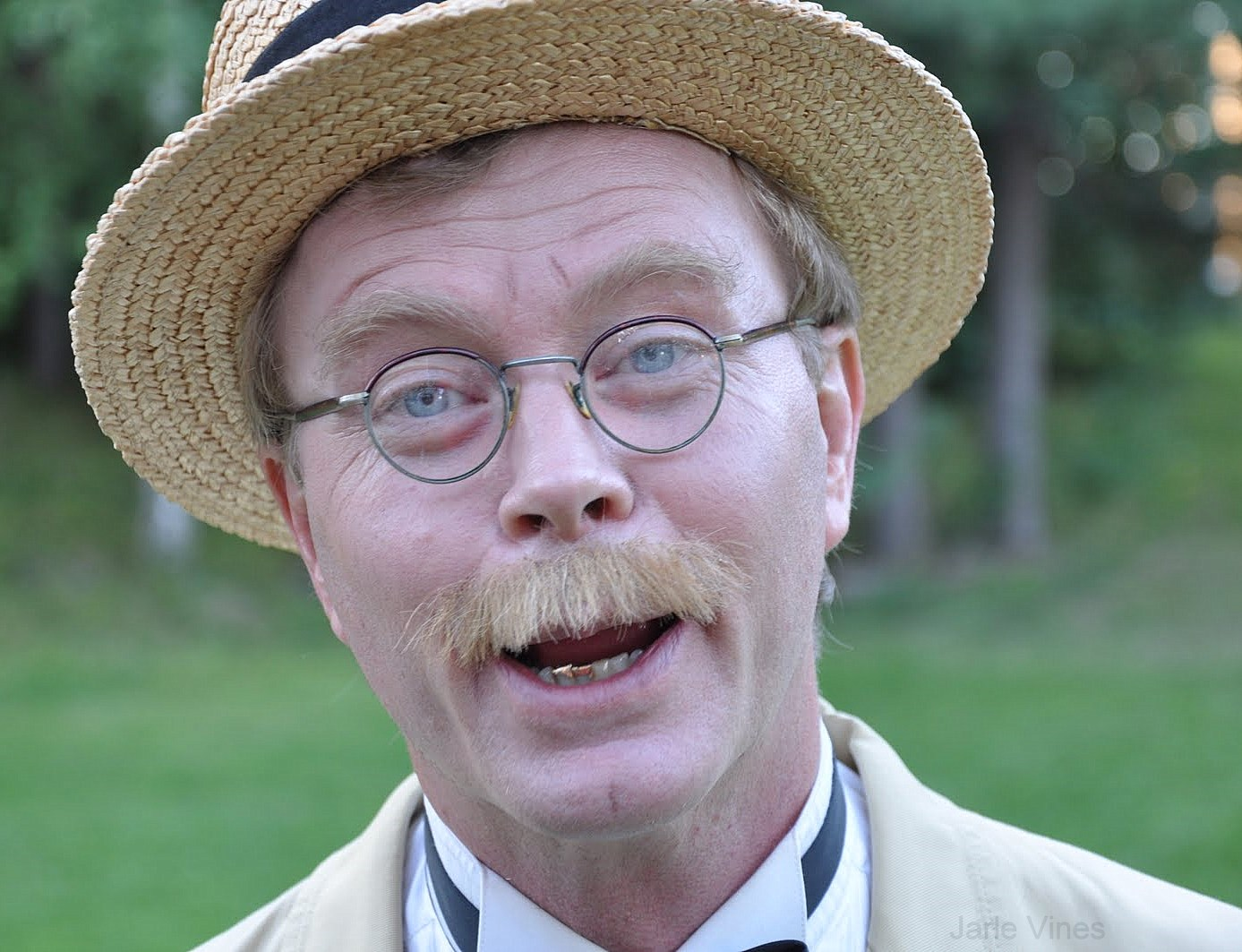
Øystein Bache as one of Hurraguttene

Øystein Bache (born 23 September 1960 in Oslo) is a Norwegian comedian and actor.

He has worked on many comedy programmes for NRK1 together with his partner Rune Gokstad. He is best known as the frontman on the satirical TV programme Egentlig 1993-97 and its follow-up Øystein og meg 1997–2000. Bache has long been linked with live television programmes such as the Norwegian Melodi Grand Prix which he presented in 1998, 1999 and 2003. From 2003 he began to present NRK's Frokost-TV. Bache is also the presenter of the comedy programme Løvebakken which is shown on Saturdays. He also often takes part in the panel on the radio show Twenty Questions on NRK P1 and has also been the stand-in host. He has recently worked as producer on a number of programmes shown on NRK, most recently Fridtjofs jul which was shown at Christmas.

== TV appearances ==
- 2005: Sommeråpent
- 2004-: Løvebakken
- 2003-06: Frokost-TV
- 2003: Norsk Melodi grand prix (presenter)
- 2000: Den store klassefesten
- 1999: Norsk Melodi grand prix (presenter)
- 1998: Norsk Melodi grand prix (presenter)
- 1997-00: Øystein og meg (Joint host)
- 1997: Akkurat nå
- 1995: O.J. – på nye eventyr (Pianist)
- 1993-97: Egentlig (Many roles)
- 1990: Hotel (presenter)
- 1989: Norsk Melodi grand prix (presenter)
