= Apprentice to Murder =

- Directed by: Ralph L. Thomas
- Screenplay by: Allan Scott; Wesley Moore
- Produced by: Howard K Grossman
- Starring: Donald Sutherland; Chad Lowe; Mia Sara; Knut Husebo
- Cinematography: Kelvin Pike
- Edited by: Patrick McMahon
- Music by: Charles Gross
- Production company: Hot International A.S
- Distributed by: New World Pictures
- Release date: 1988
- Running time: 94 minutes
- Countries: Norway; United States

Apprentice to Murder is a 1988 thriller film created and developed by Howard K Grossman, directed by Ralph L. Thomas, and starring Donald Sutherland, Chad Lowe and Mia Sara.

== Premise ==
A teenager (Chad Lowe) is torn between his lover (Mia Sara) and a doctor (Donald Sutherland) of "powwow medicine" in 1920s Pennsylvania.

== Cast ==
- Donald Sutherland as John Reese
- Chad Lowe as Billy Kelly
- Mia Sara as Alice Spangler
- Knut Husebø as Lars Hoeglin
- Rutanya Alda as Elma Kelly
- Eddie Jones as Tom Kelly
- Mark Burton as Clay Myers
- Adrian Sparks as Irwin Myers
- Tiger Haynes as Rufus
- Minnie Gentry as Isobel

== Production ==
The film was developed by Howard K Grossman based on a murder that took place in 1928 in his home town of York, Pennsylvania under the working title of The Long Lost Friend (the name of a famous pow-wow book) and had its principal photography begin early September, 1986, in Bergen, Norway. According to the September 19, 1986 issue of Variety, the film had a budget of 10 million dollars which was raised by Grossman and was entirely funded by Norwegian money. Apprentice to Murder was entirely shot in Norway. Production was scheduled to finish early November, 1986, but according to Screen International on November 29, 1986, the film was still filming in Norway. By 1987, Grossman who had been developing another project with his long time friend and Oscar winning screenwriter John Briley (who came to Norway to meet with Grossman's company HOT) convinced Grossman and his director to change the film's title to Apprentice to Murder.

== Release ==
The film was originally set for a November 6, 1987 release. The Daily Variety on December 31, 1987, that the film would have its premiere on January 2, 1988, in York, PA. The New York Daily News stated that Apprentice to Murder was opening on February 27, 1988, in New York while the American Film Institute stated that the film opened in New York and Los Angeles on February 26.
