= Daler =

Daler may refer to:

== Currency ==
- Scandinavian daler, a version of the thaler, introduced to Scandinavia in the 17th century
  - Danish rigsdaler
  - Danish West Indian rigsdaler
  - Greenlandic rigsdaler
  - Norwegian rigsdaler
  - Norwegian speciedaler
  - Swedish riksdaler

== People ==
- Daler Imomnazarov (born 1995), Tajik footballer
- Daler Kuzyayev (born 1993), Russian footballer
- Daler Mehndi (born 1967), Indian singer
- Daler Nazarov (born 1959), Tajik composer and actor
- Daler Sharipov, Tajik military conductor
- Daler Tukhtasunov (born 1986), Tajikistani footballer
- Daler Xonzoda (born 1989), Uzbek singer
- Jennifer Daler, New Hampshire politician
- Jiří Daler (born 1940), Czech Olympic cyclist

== Other uses ==
- Daler (parish), a community in Tønder Municipality, Region of Southern Denmark
- Daler-Rowney, a British art materials manufacturer
