= Desperate Acquaintances =

- Directed by: Svend Wam
- Written by: Svend Wam
- Starring: Anders Dale; Janic Heen; Bjarte Hjelmeland
- Release date: 1998
- Country: Norway
- Language: Norwegian

Desperate Acquaintances (Norwegian: Desperate bekjentskaper) is a 1998 Norwegian drama film directed by Svend Wam, starring Anders Dale, Janic Heen and Bjarte Hjelmeland. It is about three men in their mid-twenties – Anders (Dale), Mefistofeles (Heen) and Yngve (Hjelmeland) – who are struggling to fit in.

== Production ==
Desperate Bekjentskaper was a low-budget production with a total budget of 5.5 million NOK. Of this amount, 3.9 million NOK was provided as support from the Norwegian Film Institute. Principal photography took 22 days during May and June 1998, with the film being shot primarily at MAP Film & Video Production in Oslo. The crew was characterized by a low average age, and several members made their feature film debut with this production.
