= Aberdeen (2000 film) =

- Swedish DVD cover
- Directed by: Hans Petter Moland
- Written by: Kristin Amundsen; Lars Bill Lundholm
- Produced by: Petter J. Borgli; Tom Remlov
- Starring: Stellan Skarsgård; Lena Headey; Charlotte Rampling
- Cinematography: Philip Øgaard
- Edited by: Sophie Hesselberg
- Music by: Zbigniew Preisner
- Distributed by: Svensk Filmindustri (SF) AB (Sweden); First Run Features (US)
- Release date: 8 September 2000 (Norway)
- Running time: Norway: 113 minutes US: 106 minutes
- Countries: United Kingdom; Norway; Sweden
- Language: English
- Budget: $6,500,000

Aberdeen is a 2000 Norwegian-British drama film directed by Hans Petter Moland and starring Stellan Skarsgård, Lena Headey and Charlotte Rampling.

== Synopsis ==
Lawyer Kaisa Heller, just promoted, has no apparent emotional attachments, preferring nameless encounters with men. She is surprised to receive a call from Helen, her dying mother, with a final request to bring Kaisa's estranged father, Tomas, to see her at the hospital. The film is a bit of a road movie with encounters along the way; some are confrontational, such as boozing louts who harass her father or angry stewardesses issuing ultimatums, while some are romantic, such as truck driver Clive, whom Kaisa attempts to use, but instead finds herself attached to. What started as an unavoidable chore, perhaps the last she will have never been able to dodge, becomes a new starting point in her life.

== Cast ==
- Stellan Skarsgård - Tomas Heller
- Jean Anderson - Young Kaisa
- Lena Headey - Kairo 'Kaisa' Heller
- Charlotte Rampling - Helen
- Ian Hart - Clive
- Louise Goodall - Sara
- Jason Hetherington - Perkins
- Kate Lynn Evans - Emily
- John Killoran - Blake
- Fergis McLarnon - Eric
- Anders T. Andersen - Customs Official
- Nina Andresen Borud - Flight Attendant
- Henriette Steenstrup - Car Rental Clerk
- Kari Simonsen - Waitress
- J.J. Mckeown - Boy at door
- Jan Grønli - Granbakken
- Gard Eidsvold - Disagreeable Man

== Critical response ==
On Rotten Tomatoes the film has an approval rating of 87%, with the site's consensus reading: "Though the characters are difficult to watch at times, Aberdeen burns with ferocious honesty and strong performances."
