= Kamilla and the Thief =

Kamilla og Tyven
- DVD cover
- English: Kamilla and the Thief
- Directed by: Grete Salomonsen
- Written by: Grete Salomonsen; Kari Vinje (novel)
- Produced by: Odd Hynnekleiv
- Starring: Veronika Flåt; Dennis Storhøi; Agnete Haaland; Morten Harket; Maria del Mar
- Cinematography: Odd Hynnekleiv
- Edited by: Grete Salomonsen (as Grete S. Hynnekleiv)
- Music by: Ragnar Bjerkreim
- Production company: Penelope Film
- Distributed by: United International Pictures
- Release date: 24 March 1988
- Running time: 106 minutes
- Country: Norway
- Languages: Norwegian and English

Kamilla and the Thief (Norwegian: Kamilla og Tyven) is a Norwegian family movie from 1988 directed by Grete Salomonsen and produced by her husband Odd Hynnekleiv. The movie is an adaption from a Norwegian children's novel by Kari Vinje, and is the first feature film of renowned Norwegian actor Dennis Storhøi and also stars 1980s pop idol Morten Harket in a minor role. Kamilla and the Thief was a huge success in Norway, selling half a million tickets (in a country of about 4 million people). It was so popular that a sequel was made, Kamilla and the Thief II, which was released the year after. In 2005 both movies were digitally restored and released on DVD.

== Synopsis ==
The story takes place in Southern Norway around 1913 and follows Kamilla, a young girl who becomes an orphan. After left with no other options, she is sent to live with her wealthy uncle Ole in Kristiansand. However, upon her arrival, Kamilla is met with a cold reception from Ole's wife, who dislikes children and insists on sending her away to a boarding school in Denmark. Ole, whom thinks that his wife's suggestion is heartless, decides to reunite Kamilla with her older sister, Sofie, who works as a kitchen maid on a large estate in the countryside.

While traveling to her sister in the countryside Kamilla faces misfortune after she is robbed. Just when all hope seems lost, a mysterious stranger named Sebastian comes to her aid. Displaying courage and resourcefulness, Sebastian risks a great deal to protect her. What Kamilla doesn't realize, however, is that her heroic savior is a fugitive thief, on the run and constantly evading capture.

== Cast ==
- Veronika Flåt as Kamilla
- Dennis Storhøi as Sebastian
- Agnete Haaland as Sofie
- Morten Harket as Christoffer

== Production ==
Kamilla and the Thief was the first feature film to be produced in Kristiansand, and was financed privately, in a time when it was common (and still is) for Norwegian films to receive support from the government to get produced. Producer Odd Hynnekleiv took three years to find investors to the project. After the film's success it took only three weeks to secure investors for the sequel, Kamilla and the Thief II.

Hynnkleiv and his wife, director Grete Salomonsen produced the film with their own company, Penelope Film. The crew were mixed with local talent and international craftsmen.
