= Kerim Chatty =

Tunisian man

Kerim Chatty (born 15 January 1973) is a Swedish man, who was suspected in 2002 of attempted aircraft hijacking and arrested at Stockholm Västerås Airport, as he was trying to board a Ryanair Flight 685 headed to the London Stansted Airport. He was subsequently released from police custody and the preliminary inquiry regarding attempted hijacking was dropped.

Chatty was born in Botkyrka south of Stockholm, to a Tunisian physiotherapist father and a Swedish mother. He had his first encounter with the police in 1991 when he was convicted of illegal driving. He was later convicted for several crimes such as assault, theft, handling stolen goods, and driving under the influence. He was also devoted to martial arts and Muay Thai, winning a gold medal at a Swedish martial arts championship in 1994.

In September 1996 he was accepted into the North American Institute of Aviation in Conway, US, where he undertook some flight training courses, but was expelled from the school a few months later for "lack of progress" in the programme. Chatty returned to Sweden in 1997 and starred the same year in the Swedish film 9 millimeter alongside several noted Swedish actors. While serving a sentence for firearms possession at the Österåker Prison in 1998, he shared a cell with Oussama Kassir, a militant Islamist charged with terrorism who has said that he "loves al-Qaeda and Osama bin Laden". Kassir said he became close friends with Chatty and was instrumental in his conversion to Islam. According to BBC News he was "believed to have become" a devotee of the Salafi school of Islam. According to BBC, friends and relatives have stated that at the time of the 11 September 2001 attacks he was attending a religious school in Saudi Arabia.

Chatty has stated that he does not support terrorism, and that the 11 September 2001 attacks were a "sin". His friends called the allegations "ridiculous", and dismissed claims that Kassir had made him convert to Islam.

Chatty was arrested at the Stockholm Västerås Airport on 29 August 2002, as he was trying to board a Ryanair Flight 685 headed to the London Stansted Airport, with a loaded pistol in his hand luggage, contained in a bag of toiletries. He was charged with attempted hijacking, but claimed he was only on his way with a group of others to an Islamic conference in Birmingham. An organiser of the conference in Birmingham said however that it was "highly unlikely" that the suspected hijacker was due to attend the conference. A military intelligence source cited by Reuters said that "We know for sure that the plan was to crash the plane into a US embassy in Europe." The Swedish Security Service denied the claims and called the reports "false information".

Chatty denied the charges of attempted hijacking and said that he had simply "forgotten" that he had a pistol in the bag.

In the absence of evidence, Chatty was released from custody on 30 September, and on 30 October the preliminary investigation regarding attempted hijacking was closed. He was however charged with firearms offences and on 20 December sentenced to four months in prison.
