= Aage Kvalbein =

Norwegian cellist and professor in cello

Aage Kvalbein (born 29 March 1947) is a Norwegian cellist and a professor in cello at the Norwegian Academy of Music. He is one of the most well-renowned musicians in Norway, both as a soloist, chamber musician and as a pedagogue.

Kvalbein was born in Oslo. At age 33, he became the first professor of cello in Norway. He is married to the Norwegian actress Mari Maurstad. The couple have three children. He has made approximately 40 recordings of music by various composers.
