= Sara Alström =

Swedish actress

Sara Alström (born 28 October 1975 in Stockholm) is a Swedish former actress. She started acting when she was 11 years old, then together with her younger sister Hanna. She first gained notoriety for her role as Lina Dahlén in the popular soap opera Rederiet. She studied at Balettakademien, Kulturama, and the Stella Adler Studio of Acting in New York City.

She was born on 28 October 1975.

She has a daughter. As of 2015, she worked in sales and marketing for organic skincare products.

== Filmography ==
=== Film ===
- Badhuset (1989)
- Sebastian (1995)
- 9 millimeter (1997)

=== Television ===
- Rederiet (1996)
- Vänner och fiender (1996)
