= Faderen =

1860 short story by Bjørnstjerne Bjørnson

"Faderen" (The Father) is a short story published in 1860 by the Norwegian writer Bjørnstjerne Bjørnson in his collection Smaastykker (Small Pieces). It is one of his peasant stories.

The theme is related to the lidelsens høgskole 'college of suffering', a concept that Bjørnson developed when he read texts by the German preacher Ludwig Hofacker in the summer of 1859. The protagonist Thord Øveraas goes from prosperity and pride through deep despair to humility.

== Plot ==
Thord Øveraas ("Thord Over-Hill") is a rich and prosperous farmer, one of the most powerful men in his community. One day he stands in the priest's office and says he wants his son baptized. The baptism is scheduled for the coming Saturday at twelve o'clock. The priest asks if there is anything else, and Thord replies "Otherwise there is nothing". The priest offers a simple blessing to Thord, "I pray to God that the child will come to your good".

Sixteen years later, Thord comes to the priest's living room, and asks to have his son confirmed. The priest says yes, and comments on Thord not having aged. He pays the priest well when he finds out that his son will be first in line at the communion. Again, the priest asks if there is anything else, and Thord replies "Otherwise there is nothing".

Eight years go by and Thord stands in the priest's office with several men from the village. The son is to marry Karen Storlien ("Karen Big-Hillside"), the daughter of the village's richest man. He pays three daler, although the priest says he should receive only one. Thord explains that this is because his son is an only child, and that he would like to do it well – besides, now he will be done with the son.

Fourteen days later, Thord and his son are out rowing and talking about the wedding, when the son falls out of the boat and drowns. The father looks his son for three days and three nights, without eating. On the morning of the third day, he finds his son's body and carries him up the slope to his farm.

An entire year passes. One autumn evening, the priest hears someone walking fumbling with the lock, and checking the front room, finds Thord. He is thin, white-haired and forward-bent. He says he has sold his farm and wants to donate half the money for a grant in his son's name. The priest is silent for a time, and then asks Thord what he will do now. "Something better", replies Thord. The priest says "Now I think your son has finally come to your good." "Yes, now I think so too," replies Thord, whilst two heavy tears fall down his face.
