= Benoni (novel) =

1908 novel by Knut Hamsun

Benoni, written in 1908, is part of a double novel by Knut Hamsun. Benoni is the first part, and Rosa is the sequel and second part of the double work.

Benoni is about the spirited Benoni Hartvigsen, who, at the beginning of the novel, is a poor mail-carrier and fisherman with little social standing, but one day he receives a large sum of money. During the book, Benoni develops into one of the wealthiest men in Sirilund, the village where most of the novel is set.

The 1975 six-part film Benoni and Rosa (Benoni og Rosa) was based on the novel.
