= Rosa (novel) =

1908 novel by Knut Hamsun

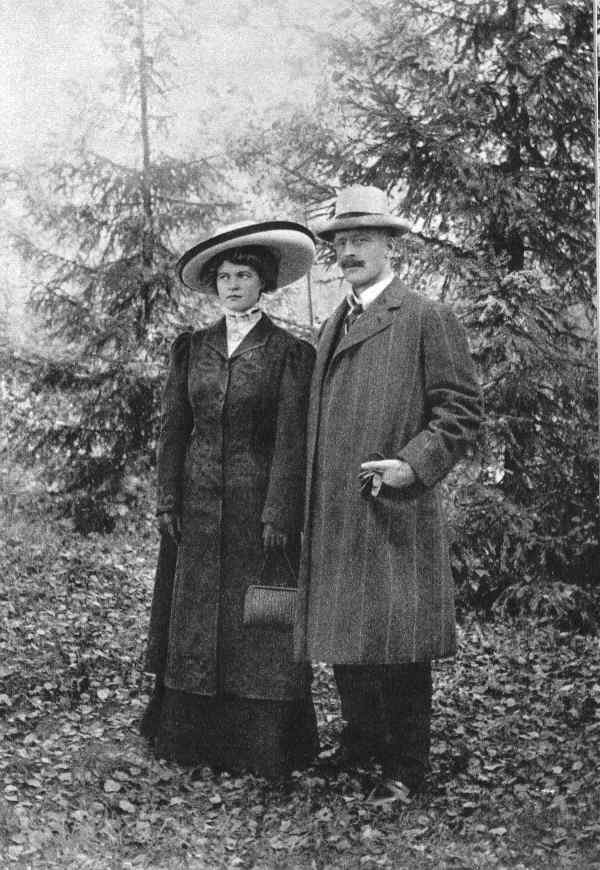
Knut Hamsun & Marie Hamsun, around 1909

Rosa is part of a double novel by Knut Hamsun first published in 1908. Benoni is the first part, and Rosa is the sequel and the final part of the double novel. The action is set in Nordland, in the village of Sirilund, with, among other characters, the merchant Mack and the upstart Benoni. Rosa is left alone after her husband leaves her.

The 1975 six-part film Benoni and Rosa (Benoni og Rosa) was based on the novel.

An English translation of Rosa by Sverre Lyngstad was published in 1997.
