= Victoria L =

1982 film

- Directed by: Petter Vennerød; Svend Wam
- Produced by: Petter Vennerød; Svend Wam
- Starring: Wenche Foss
- Release date: 19 March 1982
- Running time: 83 minutes
- Country: Norway
- Language: Norwegian

Victoria L (Norwegian: Leve sitt liv) is a 1982 Norwegian comedy film directed by Petter Vennerød and Svend Wam. The film was selected as the Norwegian entry for the Best Foreign Language Film at the 55th Academy Awards, but was not accepted as a nominee.

== Cast ==
- Wenche Foss as Victoria Lund
- Pål Øverland as Carl
- Arne Bang-Hansen as Hilmar
- Monna Tandberg as Beatrice

== See also ==
- List of submissions to the 55th Academy Awards for Best Foreign Language Film
- List of Norwegian submissions for the Academy Award for Best Foreign Language Film
