= Buicken – store gutter gråter ikke =

1991 Norwegian drama film

- Directed by: Hans Otto Nicolaysen
- Written by: Hans Otto Nicolaysen
- Starring: Lasse Lindtner; Helge Jordal
- Release date: 1991
- Running time: 88 minutes
- Country: Norway
- Language: Norwegian

Buicken – store gutter gråter ikke (English: The Buick – big boys don't cry) is a 1991 Norwegian drama film written and directed by Hans Otto Nicolaysen, starring Lasse Lindtner and Helge Jordal.

The two brothers Ken (Lindtner) and Bent (Jordal) are separated at an early age, when their parents divorce. When they meet again as adults, Ken is a successful businessman, while Bent is a factory worker and labour leader. Bent's glass work factory is in trouble, and Ken steps in and finds new investors. One year later Ken returns to the city, to find that Bent has been fired and has left his wife. He visits the remote summerhouse where Bent has moved out. Here he finds a diary, a giant pile of driftwood and Bent's crashed Buick, but no Bent.
