= Rune Gokstad =

Norwegian comedian, radio and television host

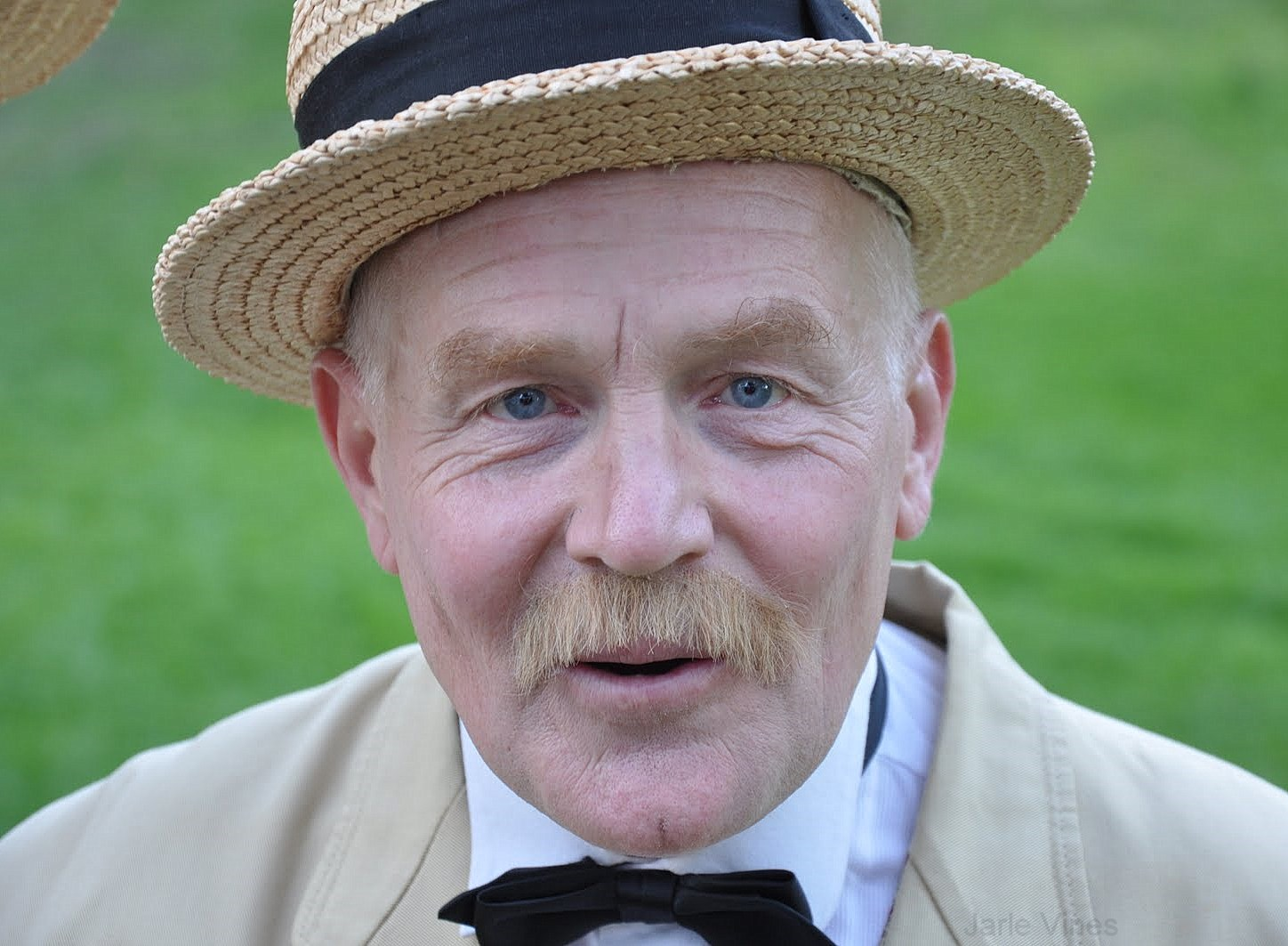
- Born: 26 November 1958 (age 66); Oslo, Norway
- Occupation(s): Comedian, actor, and radio and television host
- Awards: Leonard Statuette (2010)

Rune Gokstad (born 26 November 1958) is a Norwegian comedian, actor, and radio and television host.

== Career ==
Born in Oslo, Gokstad was assigned with NRK from 1987. He worked with radio shows such as Nitimen and Reiseradioen, and has created and hosted humorous television shows, including the series Egentlig (1993–2000) and Øystein og meg (1997–2001), in cooperation with Øystein Bache. With Backe he also hosted the travel documentary Team Bachstad, and he has been responsible for quiz shows such as Julenøtter and Påskenøtter.

He was awarded the Leonard Statuette in 2010, and the Riksmål Society's television award in 2014.

== Selected works ==
- Latterlige øyeblikk. 2006.
