= Olsenbanden Jr. og Sølvgruvens hemmelighet =

- Theatrical release poster
- Directed by: Arne Lindtner Næss
- Written by: Arne Lindtner Næss
- Produced by: Roy Anderson; Rune H. Trondsen
- Starring: Ola Isaac Høgåsen Mæhlen; Robert Opsahl; Ole Martin Wølner; Jacob Beranek Hvattum; Maren Eikli Hiorth; Anders Hatlo; Johannes Joner; Iren Reppen
- Release date: 2 February 2007
- Running time: 82 minutes
- Country: Norway
- Language: Norwegian

Olsenbanden Jr. og Sølvgruvens hemmelighet (lit. The Junior Olsen Gang and the Silver Mine Mystery) is a 2007 Norwegian children's film, the fourth film of the Olsenbanden Jr. series.

== Plot ==
The plot follows the young members of the Olsenband when they chase the lost crown jewels in the royal mines. The pursuit of the lost crown jewels leads Egon Olsen and his friends as well as their enemies to Kongsberg, while they're hunted by police.

== Cast ==
- Ola Isaac Høgåsen Mæhlen as Egon
- Ole Martin Wølner as Benny
- Robert Opsahl as Kjell
- Maren Eikli Hjorth as Valborg
