= Betrayal (1981 film) =

- Theatrical release poster
- Directed by: Vibeke Løkkeberg
- Written by: Vibeke Løkkeberg
- Starring: Vibeke Løkkeberg; Helge Jordal; Nina Knapskog; Kenneth Johansen
- Release date: 25 September 1981
- Running time: 110 minutes
- Country: Norway
- Language: Norwegian

Betrayal (Norwegian: Løperjenten) is a 1981 Norwegian drama film directed by Vibeke Løkkeberg, starring Løkkeberg and Helge Jordal.

Betrayal is set in Bergen in the year 1948. The film's protagonist is the seven-year-old Kamilla (Knapskog), who grows up in a society under reconstruction, and in a family in disintegration. Her parents are mostly concerned about money and about themselves, but in her friend Svein (Johansen) Kamilla finds the love and solidarity that she is missing.
