= Gunilla Olsson =

Swedish actress

- Born: 16 December 1947 (age 78); Stockholm, Sweden
- Occupation: Actress
- Years active: 1962-present

Gunilla Olsson (born 16 December 1947) is a Swedish actress. She has appeared in more than 25 films and television shows since 1962.

== Selected filmography ==
- Badarna (1968)
- Julia Julia (1981)
- False as Water (1985)
