= Anne Marie Ottersen =

Norwegian actress (born 1945)

- Born: 29 April 1945 (age 81); Kongsberg, Norway
- Occupation: Actress
- Years active: 1969–present
- Spouse: Lasse Lindtner (1990–)
- Children: 3
- Awards: Amanda (1986) for Hustruer - ti år etter

Anne Marie Ottersen Lindtner (born 29 April 1945) is a Norwegian actress. She has been working at Nationaltheatret (the National Theatre) since 1970, and acted in roles such as "Polly Peachum" in Bertolt Brecht's The Threepenny Opera, and "Martha" in Edward Albees Who's Afraid of Virginia Woolf?.

Ottersen is well known from various roles on film and television. Among her roles is "Mie" from the Hustruer-trilogy, and she won an Amanda – the main Norwegian film award – for best actress for her role in Hustruer - ti år etter in 1986. She has also acted in TV series, such as Fredrikssons fabrikk, Bot og bedring, and Holms.

Ottesen lives in Oslo, and has been married to the actor Lasse Lindtner since 1990. Together they have one daughter, and Ottersen also has two sons from a previous relationship. She is also an eager and lifelong fan of speed skating.

== Select filmography ==
- 1969: Taxi - Nattsvermere
- 1969: Psychedelica Blues
- 1974: Kimen
- 1975: Hustruer
- 1977: Kosmetikkrevolusjonen
- 1980: Nedtur
- 1984: On the Threshold
- 1985: Deilig er fjorden!
- 1985: Hustruer - ti år etter
- 1986: Drømmeslottet
- 1986: Plastposen
- 1989: Bryllupsfesten
- 1990: Fredrikssons fabrikk (TV)
- 1996: Hustruer III
- 1998: Bot og bedring (TV)
- 2002: Holms (TV)
- 2005: Import-eksport
- 2020: The Machinery (TV series)
