= Bryllupsfesten =

- Theatrical release poster
- Directed by: Petter Vennerød; Svend Wam
- Written by: Petter Vennerød
- Starring: Knut Husebø; Eli Anne Linnestad
- Distributed by: United International Pictures
- Release date: 25 August 1989
- Running time: 113 minutes
- Country: Norway
- Language: Norwegian

Bryllupsfesten (English: The wedding party) is a 1989 Norwegian comedy film written by Petter Vennerød, and directed by Vennerød and Svend Wam, starring Knut Husebø and Eli Anne Linnestad.

== Plot ==
Carl Otto Holm, a businessman, is teetering on the edge of bankruptcy. He devises a sophisticated insurance scam to safeguard the family fortune during his daughter's wedding. The plan involves burglars stealing duplicate Munch paintings, but the challenge lies in identifying the genuine ones.

== Cast ==
- Knut Husebø as Carl Otto Holm
- Eli Anne Linnestad as Dyveke Holm
- Julie Wiggen as Lise Holm
- Are Sjaastad as Are Holm
- Anders Hatlo as Anders Holm
- Svein Sturla Hungnes as Fredrik Holm
- Jon Eikemo as Henry Balstad
- Mari Bjørgan as Gerd Balstad
- Anne Marie Ottersen as Mary Holm
- Sossen Krohg as Ingegerd B. Holm
- Ernst-Hugo Järegård as Eugene Borchrewink
- Monna Tandberg as Charlotte Holm
