= Dennis Storhøi =

Norwegian actor (born 1960)

- Born: Jahn Dennis Storhøi; July 15, 1960 (age 65); Fredrikstad, Norway
- Occupation: Actor
- Spouse: Mona Keilhau Storhøi
- Children: 3

Jahn Dennis Storhøi (born 15 July 1960) is a Norwegian actor.

== Biography ==
Dennis Storhøi was born in Fredrikstad. As a theatre actor in Norway, he has won several awards, but is best known for his role as Herger the Joyous in John McTiernan's The 13th Warrior. To younger crowds he is better known for playing in several Norwegian TV shows and giving voices to cartoons.

On 17 March 2010, he and several other Norwegian actors were cast in The Thing prequel. The film is supposedly going to be about the Norwegian expedition who found the alien creature. Storhøi later dropped out of the project for personal reasons and was replaced by Ulrich Thomsen.

Storhøi had one of the leading roles in the 2015 TV mini-series The Heavy Water War.

== Personal life ==
He is married to Mona Keilhau Storhøi (who also had a small part in The 13th Warrior) and has three children, two from an earlier marriage.

== Filmography ==
Year	Title	Role	Notes
1988	Kamilla and the Thief	Sebastian	
1989	Kamilla and the Thief II	Sebastian	
1991	Buicken – store gutter gråter ikke	Skar	
1994	Over stork og stein	Torfinn Kleber	
1999	The 13th Warrior	Herger - Joyous	
1999	Evas øye	Sool	
2003	Kaptein Sabeltann	Langemann	Voice
2004	Chlorox, Ammonium and Coffee	Erik	
2010	Yohan: The Child Wanderer	Johannes Aamot	
2010	Maskeblomstfamilien	Dr. Ask	
2011	Mennesker i solen		Voice
2012	Two Lives	Lawyer Hogseth	
2013	Å begrave en hund	Fattern	
2014	Bamse and the City of Thieves	Bamse	Norwegian version, Voice
2016	Den magiske juleæske	Albert	Voice
2016	Bamse and the Witch's Daughter	Bamse	Norwegian version, Voice
2017	Elias og Storegaps Hemmelighet	Kula / Goliat	Voice
2017	Nord bei Nordwest - Der Transport	Ole Mantell	
2018	Mordene i Kongo	Morten Furuholmen	
2019	ASTRUP - Flammen over Jølster	Anton Fonn	
2022	Troll	General Sverre Lunde	
2022	A Storm for Christmas	Arthur Berg	
