= Hud (1986 film) =

1986 film

- Directed by: Vibeke Løkkeberg
- Written by: Vibeke Løkkeberg; Terje Kristiansen
- Produced by: Terje Kristiansen; Vibeke Løkkeberg
- Starring: Vibeke Løkkeberg; Keve Hjelm; Terence Stamp; Elisabeth Granneman; Per Jansen; Per Oscarsson; Tonje Kleivdal Kristiansen; Thale Svenneby
- Cinematography: Paul René Roestad
- Edited by: Terje Kristiansen
- Music by: Geir Bøhren; Arne Nordheim; Bent Åserud
- Release date: 9 October 1986
- Running time: 115 minutes
- Country: Norway
- Language: Norwegian

Hud ('Skin') is a 1986 Norwegian crime film directed by and starring Vibeke Løkkeberg. It was screened in the Un Certain Regard section at the 1987 Cannes Film Festival.

== Plot summary ==
The action takes place in a strongly male-dominated island community in Western Norway in the 1890s. Vilde, a young woman lives here with her invalid mother. Vilde has an incestuous relationship with her stepfather, which she desperately tries to hide. This relationship has resulted in a daughter, who is now ten years old. Because the daughter is mute and also not baptized, she is bullied and ostracized by the prejudiced island environment. The stepfather and the local priest demand that the woman marry a rich immigrant and baptize the child, but she refuses.

== Cast ==
- Vibeke Løkkeberg as Vilde
- Keve Hjelm as Sigurd, Vilde's Stepfather
- Terence Stamp as Edward, an artist
- Elisabeth Granneman as Vilde's Mother
- Frank Audun Kvamtrø as Antonies
- Per Jansen as Sjur
- Tonje Kleivdal Kristiansen as Malene
- Per Oscarsson as The Vicar
- Thale Svenneby as Vilde as a child

== Production ==
Tonje Kleivdal Kristiansen, who in the film plays Malene (Vilde's daughter), is the real life daughter of Vibeke Løkkeberg, who plays Vilde.

There are 5 versions of this film. The latest one, the director's cut released in 2021, is 118 minutes long and is based on the version that was presented at the 1987 Cannes Film Festival. Compared to the longest version of the film (the TV series, 268 minutes long), there are some scenes deleted and others edited. The cuts mainly concern scenes of abuse. In particular, the most explicit moments were removed from the second incest scene.

== Literature ==
Torbjørn Tumyr Nilsen (22 August 2015). "Mannlige kritikere slaktet Vibeke Løkkebergs 'Hud'. Nå beklager Per Haddal angrepene. Menn som hater filmer". Klassekampen. pp. 52–3.
