= Aksel Waldemar Johannessen =

Norwegian painter and sculptor (1880–1922)

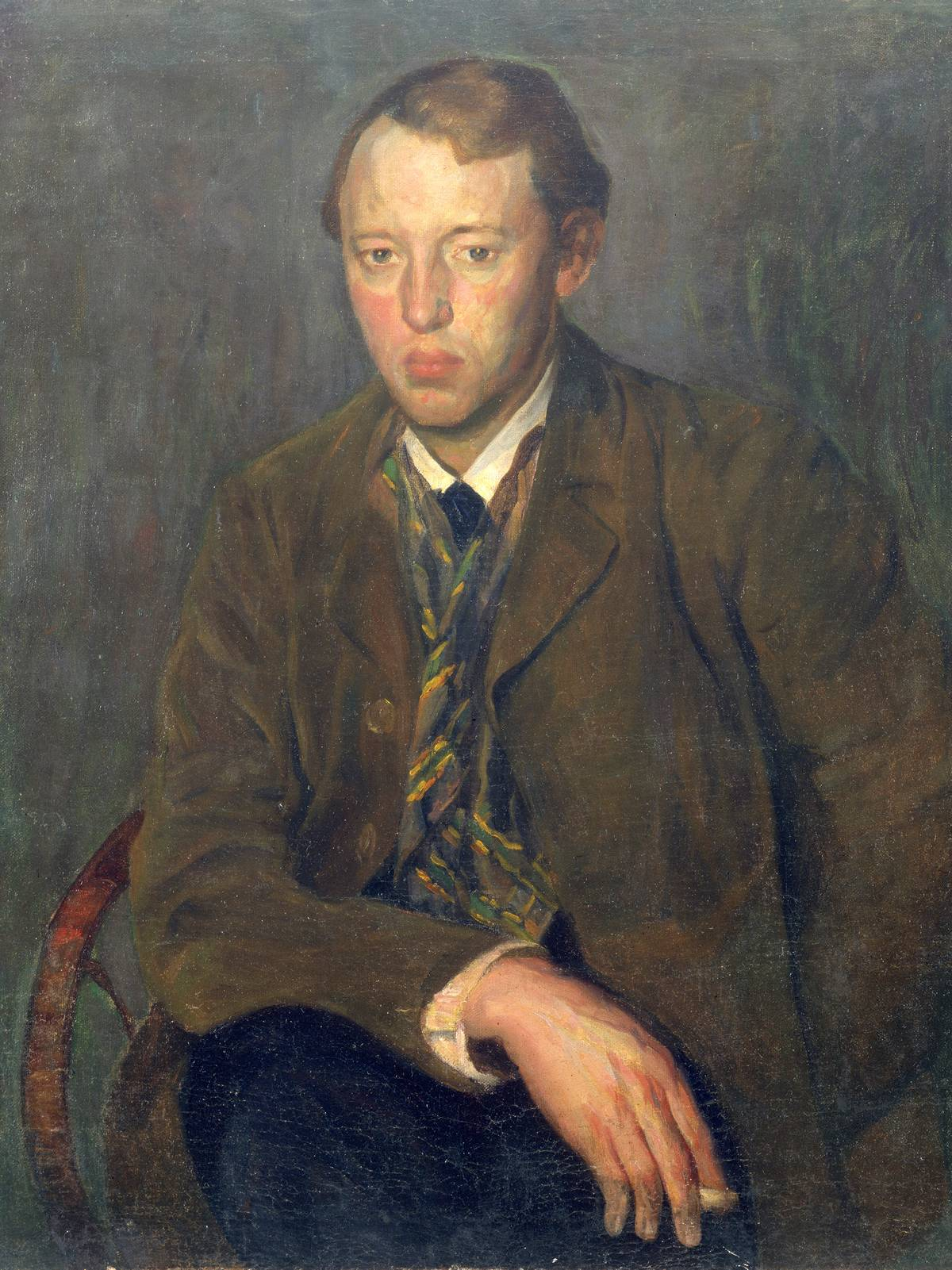
- Self portrait, oil on canvas, about1910
- Born: 1880
- Died: October 25, 1922 (aged 41–42)
- Style: Expressionism, Realism
- Spouse: Anna Nilsen (m. 1907)
- Children: 2

Aksel Waldemar Johannessen (1880 – 25 October 1922) was a Norwegian artist. He is known for his graphics work and was also a sculptor and painter. His works are classified as expressionist.

== Life ==
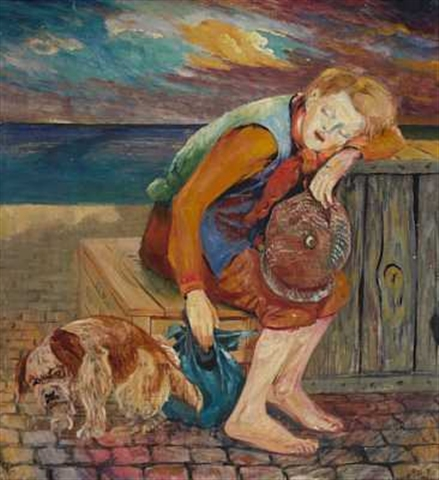
vagabond with dog, around 1910

Johannessen was born in Oslo, and grew up in the suburb of Hammersborg. Mostly, poor people lived there. He attended the state-run art school. There, he studied sculpting under Lars Utne. In 1907, he married another student, Anna Nilsen. They had two daughters. Around 1910, the couple moved to Gjøvik, where Johannessen found a job as a designer for furniture. At the start of the First World War, they moved back to Oslo, and he started painting. When painting, he soon developed his style, which was always critical of the conditions of people. His work has also been seen as a realist. In 1921, his wife was diagnosed with cancer. Johannesson started drinking more and more alcohol. As he was in bad health, he died of pneumonia.

His paintings were displayed at an exposition only after his death. Norwegian art critic Jappe Nilssen, a good friend and discoverer of Edvard Munch, said of Johannessen's work, "I dont remember seeing similar works in nordic painting". Munch himself stated, "Today, no better images are painted". Despite this, Johannessen was forgotten. Only in 1990 was his work rediscovered by art collector Haakon Mehren.

== Legacy ==
The play The Forgotten Painter by Alexander Kratzer is about Johannessen's rediscovery and his work. The first performance, directed by Andreas Baumgartner, was held in 2011, with Harald Bodigbauer as Aksel Waldemar Johannessen and Thomas Schächl as Haakon Mehren.
