= Jorunn Kjellsby =

Norwegian actress (1944–2025)

- Born: 7 April 1944
- Died: 30 October 2025 (aged 81)
- Occupation: Actress
- Years active: 1961–2025

Jorunn Kjellsby (7 April 1944 – 30 October 2025) was a Norwegian actress. She worked for Trøndelag Teater (1961–1963), Oslo Nye Teater (1968–1970) and Det Norske Teateret (from 1971). She also appeared in around 30 films, such as Bryllupsfesten (1989) and Den som frykter ulven (2004). In 2006 she was awarded an honorary Amanda Award.

Kjellsby died on 30 October 2025, at the age of 81.

== Select filmography ==
- Skulle det dukke opp flere lik er det bare å ringe (1970)
- Lasse & Geir (1976)
- Operasjon Cobra (1978)
- Svartere enn natten
- Life and Death (1980)
- Hotel St. Pauli (1988)
- Bryllupsfesten (1989)
- Lakki (1992)
- Høyere enn himmelen (1993)
- Amatørene (2001)
- Den som frykter ulven (2004)
- Rovdyr (2008)
- A Somewhat Gentle Man (2010)
