= Olsenbanden Jr. =

Norwegian comedy franchise

Olsenbanden Jr. (English: The Olsen Junior Gang) is a Norwegian comedy franchise based around a series of films and TV series of under-age criminals, based on the Olsenbanden films. Despite the original Olsen Gang being a Danish invention, the child version was originally a Swedish idea, Lilla Jönssonligan, with Denmark and Norway later following suit.

== Media ==
=== Films ===
- Olsenbanden Jr. går under Vann (2003) set in 1959
- Olsenbanden Jr. På Rocker'n (2004) set in 1960
- Olsenbanden Jr. på Cirkus (2005) set in 1960
- Olsenbanden Jr. og Sølvgruvens hemmelighet (English: The Junior Olsen Gang and the Silver Mine Mystery) (2007) set in 1960
- Olsenbanden Jr. og Det sorte gull (2009) set in 1961
- Olsenbanden Jr. og Mestertyvens skatt (2010) set in 1962

Cast overview

- Egon Olsen – Aksel Støren Aschjem, Ola Isaac Høgåsen Mæhlen, Oskar Øiestad and Thomas Stene-Johansen
- Kjell Jensen – Thomas Engeset, Robert Opsahl and Jonas Hoff Oftebro
- Benny Fransen – Lars Berteig Andersen, Ole Martin Wølner and Fridtjof Tangen
- Dynamitt-Harry – Jakob Schøyen Andersen, Jacob Beranek Hvattum and Petter Westlund
- Valborg - Julia Charlotte Geitvik, Maren Eikli Hiorth and Lina Sørlie Strand

=== TV series ===
- Olsenbandens første kupp (TV series, 2001)

=== Books ===
- Olsenbanden jr: første kupp, ISBN 8259025655; 2001
- Olsenbanden jr. på rocker'n, ISBN 8204095503; 2004
- Olsenbanden jr. på Cirkus, ISBN 8204124163; 2006
- Olsenbanden jr. : sølvgruvens hemmelighet, ISBN 8204136706; 2007

=== Video games ===
- Olsenbanden Jr. - I Vikingenes fotspor

=== Plays ===
- Olsenbanden jr. på rockern
- Olsenbanden jr. på Cirkus

=== Comics ===
- Olsenbanden Jr. og millionlotteriet, 2001
- Olsenbanden jr. hopper i det !, 2001
