= Øivin Fjeldstad =

Norwegian conductor and violinist (1903–1983)

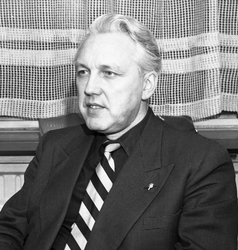
- Fjeldstad in 1953
- Born: 2 May 1903; Christiania, Norway
- Died: 16 October 1983 (aged 80); Oslo, Norway
- Burial place: Vestre gravlund, Oslo, Norway
- Education: Oslo Conservatory of Music; University of Music and Theatre Leipzig
- Occupations: Conductor; violinist
- Years active: 1921
- Employer: Oslo Philharmonic (1962–1969)
- Children: Øivin Skappel Fjeldstad; Lise Fjeldstad
- Awards: King's Medal of Merit (1954); Order of St. Olav (1962)

Øivin Fjeldstad (2 May 1903 – 16 October 1983) was a Norwegian conductor and violinist. He was artistic director and principal conductor of the Oslo Philharmonic from 1962 to 1969.

== Biography ==
A native of Oslo, Øivin Fjeldstad debuted as a violinist in 1921 following musical instruction in the conservatories of the Oslo Conservatory of Music, under the direction Gustav Lange, and the University of Music and Theatre in Leipzig, under the instruction of Walther Davisson. Ten years later, having studied with Clemens Krauss in Berlin, he began his conducting career in Oslo and, after the end of World War II and the founding of the Norwegian Radio Orchestra (Kringkastingsorkestret) in 1946, he became its head conductor. Between 1958 and 1960, the Norwegian National Opera and Ballet had Kirsten Flagstad as its general manager and Øivin Fjeldstad as its first artistic director. In 1962, he, along with Herbert Blomstedt, succeeded Odd Grüner-Hegge as head conductor of Oslo Philharmonic, the nation's leading orchestra, becoming one of the most influential figures in his country's postwar musical history.

== Personal life ==
He was awarded the King's Medal of Merit (Kongens fortjenstmedalje) in 1954 and was made a Knight 1st Class in the Royal Norwegian Order of St. Olav in 1962. In 1934, he married Julie Antoinette Skappel (1910–1996). Their daughter, Lise Fjeldstad, is a film and stage actress, while his son Øivin Skappel Fjeldstad is a banker and member of the Storting.

Øivin Fjeldstad died in 1983, aged 80, and was buried at Vestre gravlund in Oslo.
