= Erland Kiøsterud =

Norwegian novelist

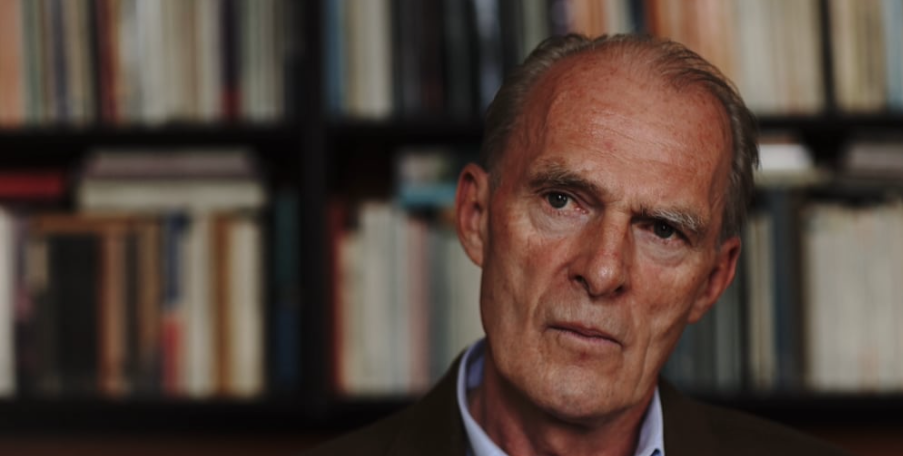
- Born: 10 November 1953 (age 72)
- Occupation: Novelist
- Awards: Gyldendal's Endowment (1986); Riksmål Society Literature Prize (2005)

Erland Kiøsterud (born 10 November 1953) is a Norwegian novelist and author of essays about society, civilisation and ethics.

He made his literary debut in 1973 with the novel Sår som aldri gror. His next novel, Jord! (1977) was made into a film in 1988.

He received the Gyldendal's Endowment in 1986, and was awarded the Riksmål Society Literature Prize in 2005.

See the latest film The Ecocentric Human about him and ecology at https://vimeo.com/490469169

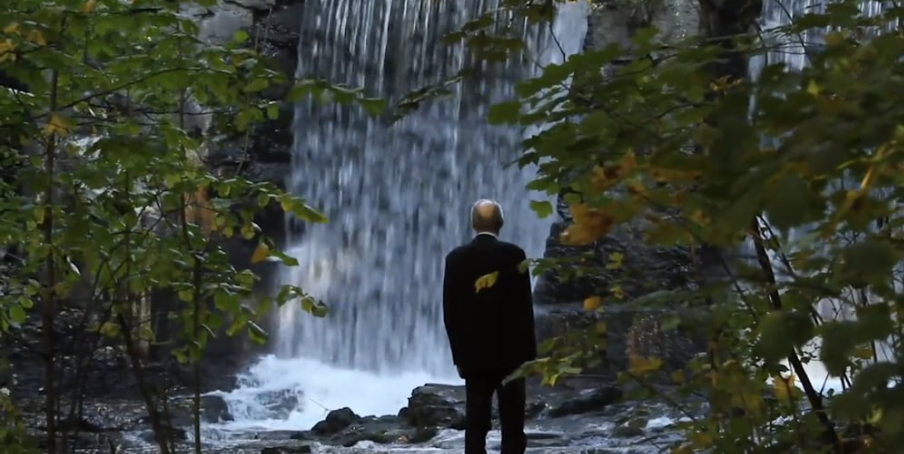
