= Daler Xonzoda =

Tajik singer (born 1989)

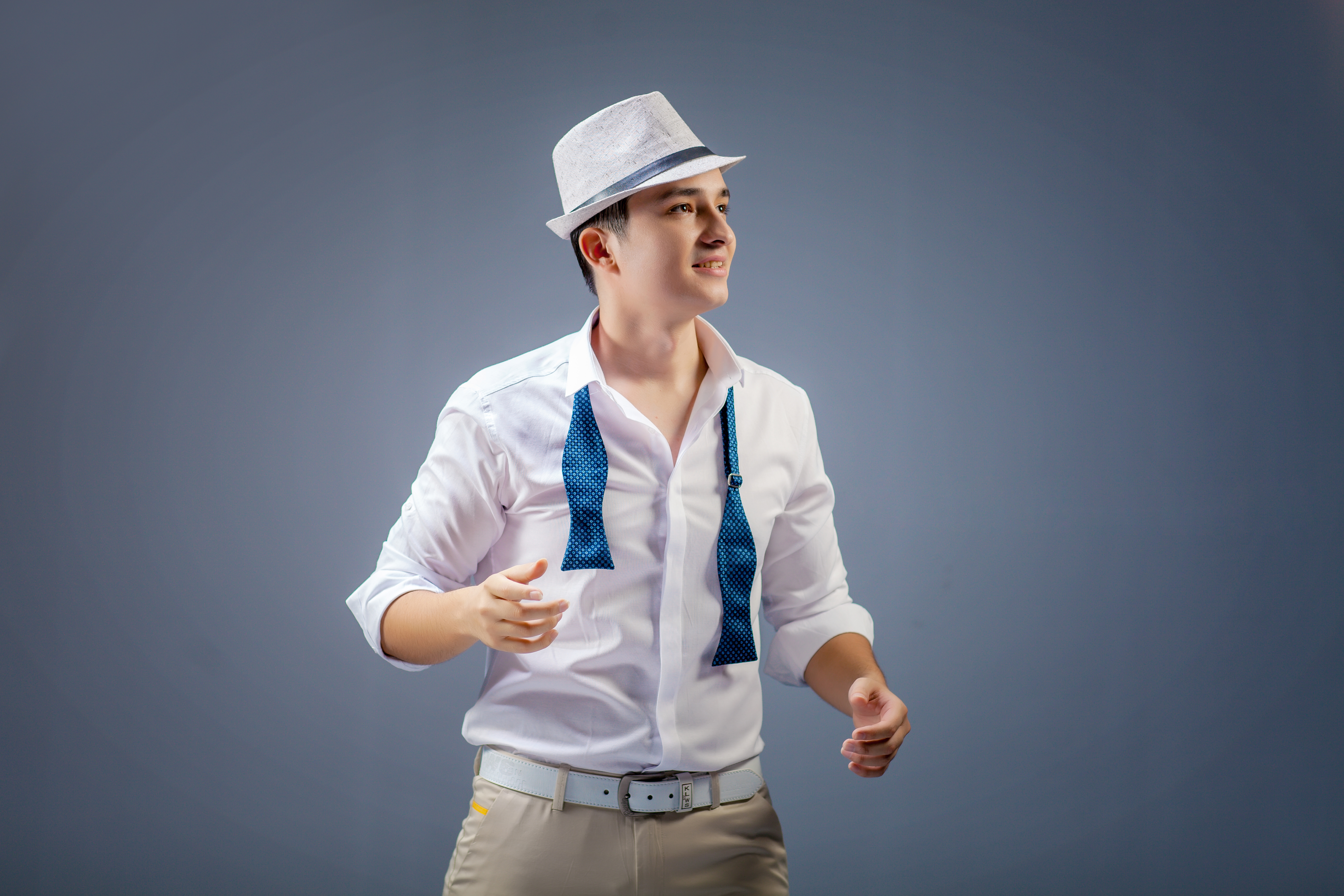

Background information
- Born: Khonov Daler Husniddinovich; April 1, 1989 (age 36); Tursunzoda, Tajik SSR
- Genres: Pop
- Occupations: Singer, songwriter
- Instrument: Vocals
- Years active: 2010–present
- Formerly of: Sahro
- Website: www.dalerxonzoda.uz

Daler Xonzoda at times Daler Khonzoda (Uzbek: Daler Xonzoda, Russian: Далер Хонзода, born Khonov Daler Husniddinovich in Tursunzoda province of Tajikistan on April 1, 1989) is a Tajik pop singer who sings in the Uzbek, English, Russian, Tajik and Karakalpak languages.

== Life and career ==
Daler was born on April 1, 1989, and at four years of age, he moved to Samarkand, Uzbekistan and in 1996 he started to go to school No.1. In 2004 he began to study music independently and in 2005, he was enrolled in the academic lyceum under Samarkand State University.

In 2006, he began to develop his own guitar and piano works. As a young singer, in 2009 he opened his own home studio, studied studio work, began to write his own songs, both lyrics and music. In August 2011, he signed a contract with the studio "PanTerra" and became a soloist of the group "Sahro" (in Cyrillic alphabet "Сахро"). The band included Daler Xonzoda and Daler Ametist. In the same year, he was nominated for "Discovery of the Year" award at the M&TVA Awards.

In 2012, Daler took part in the campaign Мы – одна команда, мы – одна семья ("We – a team, we are – one family") and made a tour throughout the Republic of Uzbekistan. The same year, he won a grant to create music videos in the award ceremonies at the M&TVA Awards and in 2013, became a member of the jury commission in a televised music competition Zo'r Zo'r Star. He also participated in the event "Uzbek Day of Culture" in both Moscow and London.

In 2013 has ended its contract with PanTerra Records, leaving the band "Sahro" and started working as a solo. In 2014 he performed a concert in the Karakalpak Republic.

== Singles ==
- "Без меня" (Without me) (in Russian language)
- "Одинок" (single) (in Russian language)
- "Сахроингман" (in Uzbek language)
- "Time is Gone"
- "Саломалейкум" (in Uzbek language)
- "Crazy for You"
- "Бегу" (in Tajik language)
- "Сенсиз" (in Uzbek language)
- "Сказка" (Tale) (in Russian language)
- "Angel"
- "Ayyor yorim" (in Karakalpak language)
- "Эслеме" (in Karakalpak language)
- "Эслама" (in Uzbek language)
- "Help me"
- "Мария" (Maria) (in Russian language)
- "Я с тобой" (I'm with you) (in Russian language)
- "Ёд кардам" (missed) (in Tajik language)
- "Любовь восточная" (love East) (in Russian language)
- "Вспоминай" (Think) (in Russian language)
- "Dardlarim aytay" (in Uzbek language)
- "Turo mexom didan" (in Tajik language)
- "Dustat Doram" (in Tajik language)
