= Life and Death (1980 film) =

1980 film

- Directed by: Petter Vennerød; Svend Wam
- Starring: Bjørn Skagestad
- Release date: 26 September 1980
- Running time: 83 minutes
- Country: Norway
- Language: Norwegian

Life and Death (Norwegian: Liv og død) is a 1980 Norwegian drama film directed by Petter Vennerød and Svend Wam. The film was selected as the Norwegian entry for the Best Foreign Language Film at the 53rd Academy Awards, but was not accepted as a nominee.

== Cast ==
- Bjørn Skagestad as Jacob
- Kjersti Døvigen as Jennifer
- Sossen Krohg as Diddi
- Knut Husebø as Harald
- Wenche Foss as Fru Bergmann
- Per Sunderland as Alexander
- Jorunn Kjellsby as Tante Nøste
- Sverre Gran as Herr Bergmann
- Vibeke Falk as Tante Liss
- Svein Tindberg as Sundby

== See also ==
- List of submissions to the 53rd Academy Awards for Best Foreign Language Film
- List of Norwegian submissions for the Academy Award for Best Foreign Language Film
