= Julia Julia =

1981 film

- Directed by: Petter Vennerød; Svend Wam
- Starring: Gunilla Olsson
- Release date: 11 August 1981
- Running time: 99 minutes
- Country: Norway
- Language: Norwegian

Julia Julia is a 1981 Norwegian comedy film directed by Petter Vennerød and Svend Wam. The film was submitted as the Norwegian entry for the Best Foreign Language Film at the 54th Academy Awards, but was not accepted as a nominee.

== Cast ==
- Gunilla Olsson as Julia
- Knut Husebø as Karl Henrik
- Audun Meling as Fred
- Thomas Robsahm as Dag
- Per Sunderland as Petter

== See also ==
- List of submissions to the 54th Academy Awards for Best Foreign Language Film
- List of Norwegian submissions for the Academy Award for Best Foreign Language Film
