= Grete Salomonsen =

Norwegian film director (1951–2026)

Grete Salomonsen (22 March 1951 – 10 January 2026) was a Norwegian film director of family films. She is probably best known for directing Kamilla and the Thief (1988), its sequel and Yohan: The Child Wanderer (2010) produced by Penelopefilm AS. The first film she directed for the big screen was PIPP, a film for very young children. Salomonsen died on 10 January 2026, at the age of 74.
