= Stanisław Korab-Brzozowski =

Polish poet and translator

Stanisław Korab-Brzozowski (1876 - 1901 in Warsaw) was a Polish poet and translator, brother of the poet Wincenty Korab-Brzozowski and son of the romantic bard Karol Brzozowski. Representative of Polish decadence. One of the greatest poets of Young Poland.

There is no information about the personal life of Stanisław Korab-Brzozowski. He was a member of Stanisław Przybyszewski's bohema called children of Satan. In 1901 Korab-Brzozowski committed suicide, probably because of his tragic love for Dagny Juel.

His poems were published in the book Nim serce ucichło (Before the Heart died away) in 1910 and he translated Charles Baudelaire's Fleurs du Mal into Polish.

== Bibliography ==
- Stanisław Korab-Brzozowski, Before the Heart Fell Silent: Collected Poems 2017 ISBN 9788308013151
