= Vibeke Løkkeberg =

Norwegian actress (born 1945)

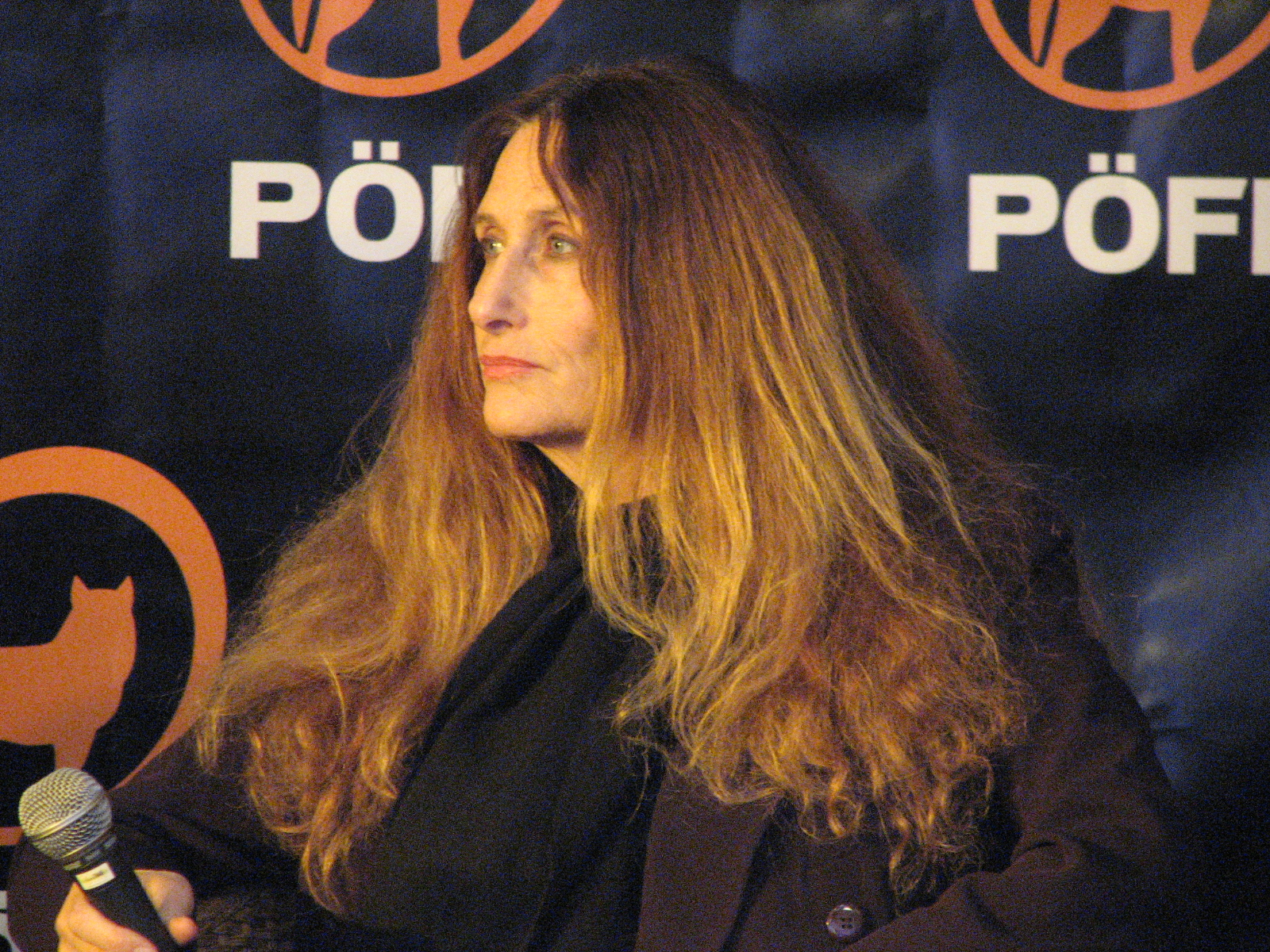
- Born: Vibeke Kleivdal; 22 January 1945 (age 81); Bergen, Norway
- Occupations: Actress, film director
- Years active: 1967–1993

Vibeke Løkkeberg (née Kleivdal; born 22 January 1945) is a Norwegian film actress and director. She appeared in 12 films between 1967 and 1991. Her film Hud was screened in the Un Certain Regard section at the 1987 Cannes Film Festival.

Her documentary Tears of Gaza was released in 2010.

== Selected filmography ==
- Liv (1967)
- Abort (1970)
- Love Is War (1971)
- Georgia, Georgia (1972)
- Løperjenten (1981)
- The Chieftain (1984)
- Hud (1986)
- Måker (1991)
- Tears of Gaza (2010)
