= Ragnar Bjerkreim =

- Born: 19 April 1958 (age 67)
- Origin: Norway
- Genres: Film scores
- Occupations: Composer, Conductor, Music producer
- Instrument: Piano
- Years active: 1988-present

Ragnar Bjerkreim (born 19 April 1958) is a Norwegian composer with film scores as his specialty.

Bjerkreim was born in Bjerkreim Municipality, and has a master's degree in music from University of Oslo; his thesis was entitled "The Function of Film Music". He received his first success as a composer for the two Kamilla and the Thief movies. Bjerkreim is now one of the most productive composers in Norwegian television.

He is also board chairman of the Norwegian Society of Composers and Lyricists.
