= Mari Maurstad =

Norwegian actress (born 1957)

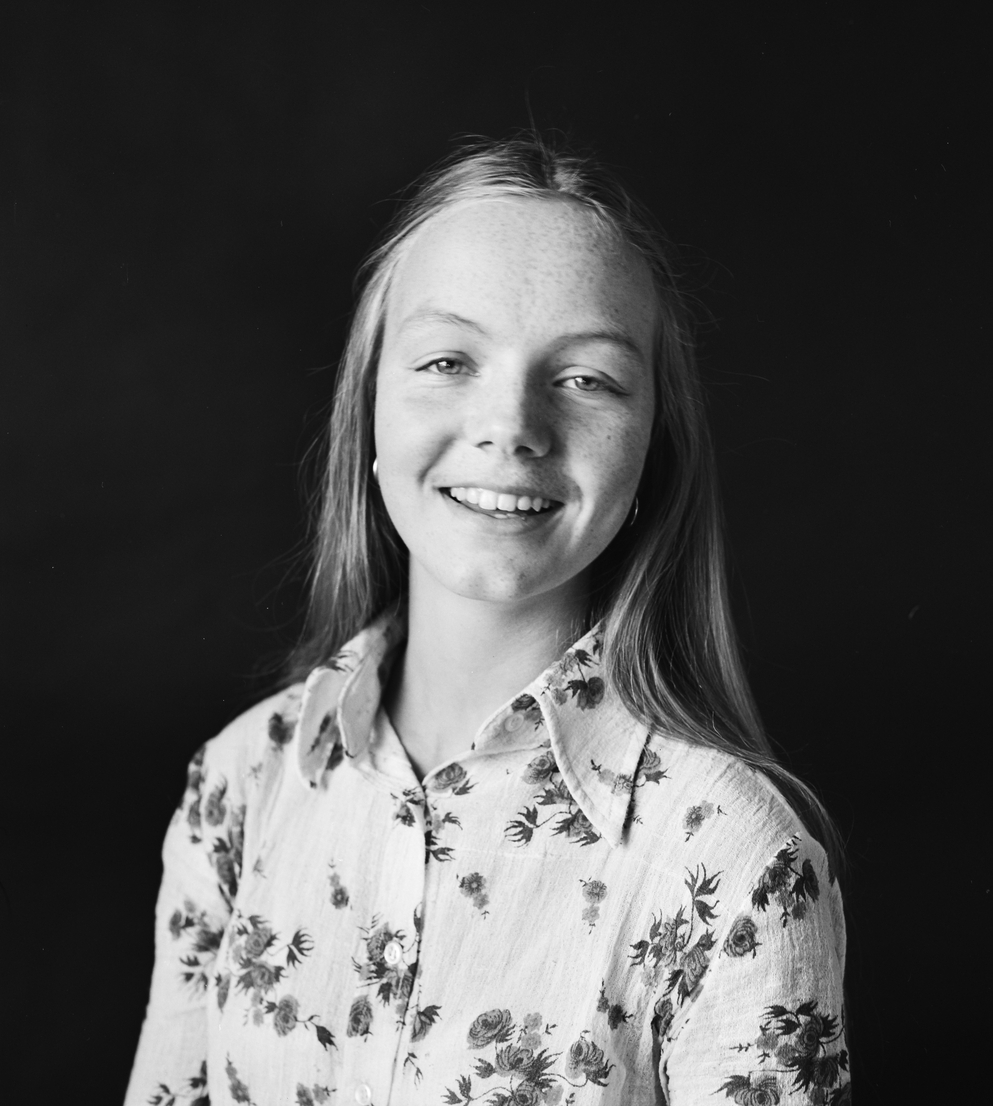
- Maurstad in 1973
- Born: Mari Maurstad; 17 March 1957 (age 69)
- Occupation: Actress
- Years active: 1981–present
- Spouse: Aage Kvalbein
- Children: 3
- Parent(s): Alfred Maurstad (father); Gro Scott-Ruud (mother)
- Relatives: Toralv Maurstad (half-brother)
- Website: https://kjentfolk.no/tjenester/mari-maurstad/

Mari Maurstad (born 17 March 1957) is a Norwegian actress. She debuted at Nationaltheatret (the National Theatre) in 1981, and has worked there since. Here she has had roles such as Polly in Brecht's The Threepenny Opera, and Mrs. Sørby in Ibsen's The Wild Duck. She has also acted in outdoor performances of Ibsen's Peer Gynt, and in several one-woman shows. In film and television she is best known for her roles in Drømmeslottet (1986) and Pilen flyttebyrå (TV, 1987). Maurstad took part in the reality show Skal vi danse (based on "Strictly Come Dancing") in 2007.

== Biography ==
She was born on 17 March 1957 to Norwegian actor Alfred Maurstad and his second wife Gro Scott-Ruud (born 8 January 1928), the daughter of Gunnar Scott-Ruud (1897–1953), a painter and cartographer and Marie Andersen (1900–1971), singing teacher and secretary.

== Dubbing roles ==
For Disney, she is best known for dubbing Daisy Duck and Huey, Dewey, and Louie in various Norwegian Disney productions, and Shenzi in The Lion King.

== Personal life ==
Mari Maurstad's father was the Norwegian actor Alfred Maurstad, and the actor Toralv Maurstad is her half-brother. She is married to cellist Aage Kvalbein; the couple have three children.
