= Per Knutsen =

Norwegian writer (1951–2022)

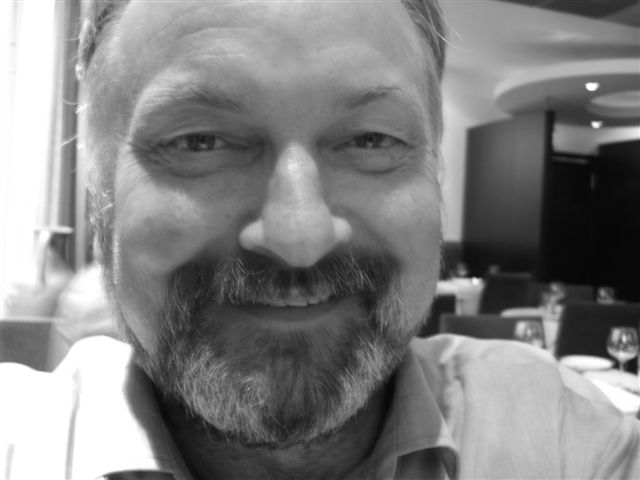
- Born: 4 August 1951; Hamarøy, Norway
- Died: 19 August 2022 (aged 71)
- Occupation: Writer
- Awards: Norwegian Critics Prize for Literature

Per Knutsen (4 August 1951 – 19 August 2022) was a Norwegian novelist, author of children's literature, crime writer and playwright.

== Life and career ==
Born in Hamarøy on 4 August 1951, Knutsen made his literary debut in 1976 with the children's book Gutten og ørna. He received the Norwegian Critics Prize for Best children's book in 1982 for Gull og sølv. Knutsen died on 19 August 2022, at the age of 71.
