= Agnete Haaland =

Norwegian actress and director

- Born: 10 March 1960 (age 65); Bergen, Norway
- Occupations: actress, organizational leader and theatre director
- Known for: * Leader of the Norwegian Actors' Equity Association; * Director of Den Nationale Scene
- Parent: Anne Gullestad
- Relatives: Arild Haaland (uncle)

Agnete Gullestad Haaland (born 10 March 1960) is a Norwegian stage and film actress, organizational leader and theatre director. She was director of the Den Nationale Scene from 2012 to 2019.

== Life and career ==
She was born in Bergen on 10 March 1960, and is a daughter of actress Anne Gullestad. She is married to filmmaker and journalist Erling Borgen.

From 2000 to 2011 she chaired the Norwegian Actors' Equity Association. She was appointed theatre director at the Bergen theatre Den Nationale Scene from 2012.

Trade union offices
Preceded by Tomas Bolme	President of the International Federation of Actors; 2008–2012	Succeeded by Ferne Downey
Cultural offices
Preceded by Bjarte Hjelmeland	Director of the Den Nationale Scene; 2012–2019	Succeeded by Stefan Larsson
