= Svend Wam =

Norwegian film director

- Born: Svend Olaf Wamnes Akstuft; 5 May 1946; Son, Norway
- Died: 7 May 2017 (aged 71); Vestby, Norway

Svend Olaf Wamnes Akstuft, known as Svend Wam (5 May 1946 – 7 May 2017), was a Norwegian film director.

Wam was born in Son, Norway. He was best known for his collaborations with Petter Vennerød, creating fourteen films under the moniker Wam og Vennerød. Wam died in Vestby after a lengthy illness, aged 71.

== Filmography ==
- Fem døgn i august (1973)
- Lasse og Geir (1976, re-released 2007)
- Det tause flertall (1976)
- Hvem har bestemt? (1978)
- Svartere enn natten (1976)
- Liv og død (1980)
- Julia Julia (1981)
- Leve sitt liv (1982)
- Åpen framtid (1983, re-released 2007)
- Adjø solidaritet (1985, re-released 2007)
- Hotel St. Pauli (1988)
- Drømmeslottet (1986, re-released 2007)
- Bryllupsfesten (1989, re-released 2007)
- Lakki (1992)
- Sebastian (1995)
- Desperate Acquaintances (1998)
