= Lise Fjeldstad =

Norwegian actress (born 1939)

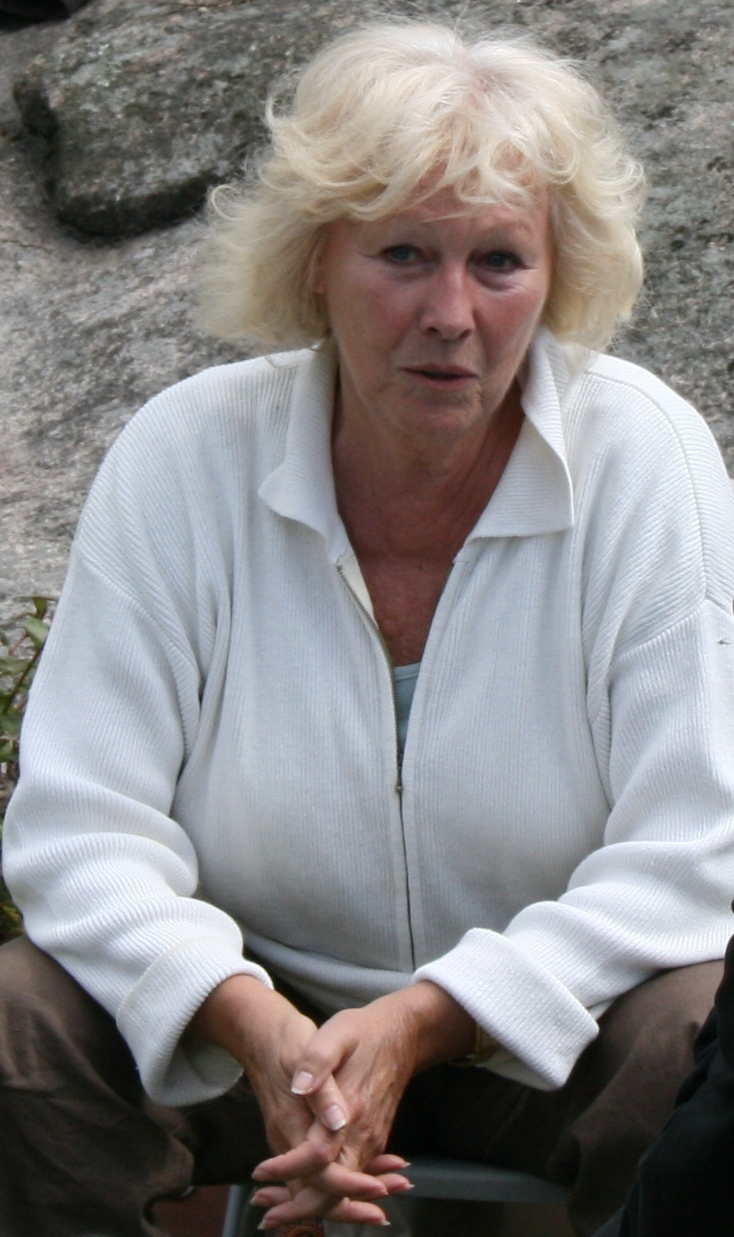
- Born: Lise Barbra Skappel Fjeldstad; 17 June 1939 (age 87); Oslo, Norway
- Occupation: Actress
- Years active: 1963 – present
- Spouse: Gordon Braddy
- Partner: Per Sunderland
- Awards: Amanda, Best Actress, 1991

Lise Barbra Skappel Fjeldstad (born 17 June 1939) is a Norwegian actress, and daughter of the conductor and violinist Øivin Fjeldstad. A graduate of the Norwegian National Academy of Theatre in 1963, she started working at Det Norske Teatret (the Norwegian Theater) immediately afterward. In 1975 she was hired by the National Theatre, where she has acted in roles such as "Blanche Dubois" in Tennessee Williams's A Streetcar Named Desire, and "Agnes" in Henrik Ibsens Brand. She won the Amanda – the main Norwegian film award – for best actress for her role in Dødsdansen in 1991. She has two children with her partner, actor Per Sunderland. She is married to Gordon Braddy.

In 1982 at the 18th Guldbagge Awards she shared the award Best Actress with Sunniva Lindekleiv and Rønnaug Alten for their roles in Little Ida.

In 1993 she was made a Knight, First Class, of the Royal Norwegian Order of St. Olav. She was awarded the Ibsen Centennial Commemoration Award and the Herman Wildenvey Poetry Award in 2006. In 2025, she was given 'Haugesund Walk of Fame', an award in the form of granite blocks laid in Haugesund's Haraldsgata at the 53rd Norwegian International Film Festival.

== Select filmography ==
Year	Title	Role
1964	Marenco	Bitten Rojansen
1966	Sult	Little girl
1969	We Are All Demons	Inger
1973	"A Doll's House" (TV)	Nora Helmer
1977	Dagny	Dagny Juel
1985	Galskap!	Marianne
1988	"Borgen skole" (TV)	Vera
2009	"Hvaler" (TV)	Liv Hansen
