= Petter Vennerød =

Norwegian film director (1948–2021)

- Born: 25 September 1948; Oslo, Norway
- Died: 19 September 2021 (aged 72)
- Occupation: Film director

Petter Vennerød (25 September 1948 – 19 September 2021) was a Norwegian film director, known for his cooperation with Svend Wam, creating fourteen films under the moniker Wam og Vennerød.

He was a son of film director Øyvind Vennerød, and brother of economist Christian Vennerød.

== Filmography ==
- Fem døgn i august (1973)
- Lasse og Geir (1976, re-released 2007)
- Det tause flertall (1977)
- Hvem har bestemt? (1978)
- Svartere enn natten (1979)
- Liv og død (1980)
- Julia Julia (1981)
- Leve sitt liv (1982)
- Åpen framtid (1983, re-released 2007)
- Adjø solidaritet (1985, re-released 2007)
- Hotel St. Pauli (1988)
- Drømmeslottet (1986, re-released 2007)
- Bryllupsfesten (1989, re-released 2007)
- Lakki (1992)
- Sebastian (1995)
