= Per Sunderland =

Norwegian actor

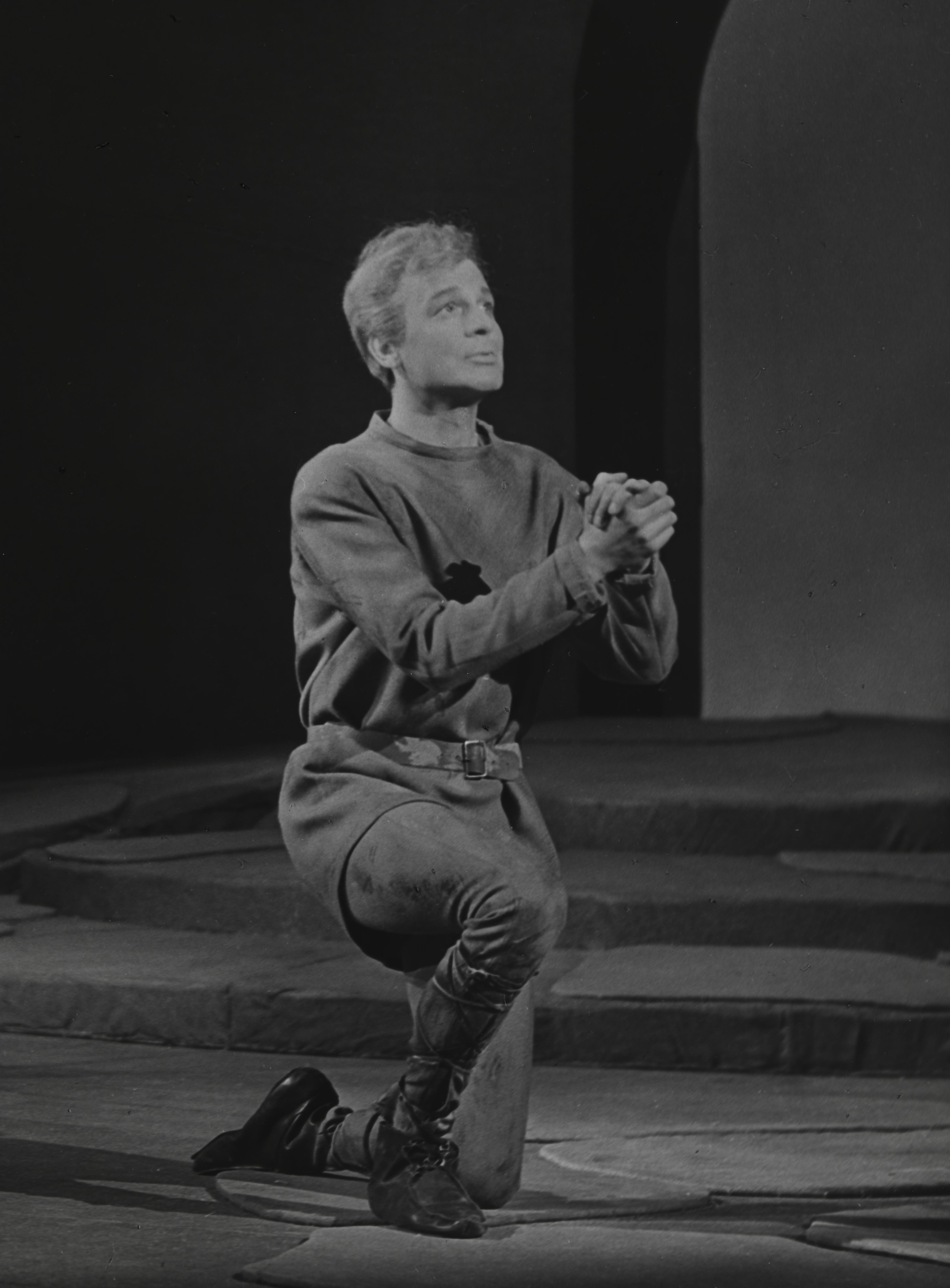
- Sunderland som Sigurd i Sigurd Slembe av Bjørnstjerne Bjørnson, Nationaltheatret, 1960
- Died: 4 June 2012

Per Sunderland (9 October 1924 – 4 June 2012) was a Norwegian stage actor and film actor. He made his stage debut at Studioteatret in 1945. He performed at Det Norske Teatret from 1949, at Det Nye Teater from 1951, at Folketeatret from 1952, and at Nationaltheatret from 1957. He played the title role in the film Hans Nielsen Hauge from 1961. Per Sunderland retired from stage and film when he reached the age limit in 1995. Shortly before he retired, he was appointed a Knight of the 1st Class of the Order of St. Olav. Sunderland died on 4 June 2012.
