= Orion's Belt (disambiguation) =

Orion's Belt is a group of three bright stars in a row in the constellation Orion.

Orion's Belt or the Belt of Orion may also refer to:

- Orion's Belt (novel), a 1977 novel
- Orion's Belt (film), a 1985 film based on the novel
- Belt of Orion Award, an award for excellence of the Air Cadet League of Canada
- Orion OB1a or Belt of Orion OB association
- Orion's Belt, the collar of the cat Orion in the film Men in Black
- "Orion's Belt", a song by Kitty Pryde from the 2012 EP Haha, I'm Sorry

== See also ==
- Orion (disambiguation)
