= Richard Harris (television writer) =

British television writer

Richard Harris (born 26 March 1934) is a British screenwriter and playwright, most active from the early 1960s to the mid-1990s. He wrote primarily for the crime and detective genres, having contributed episodes of series such as The Avengers, The Saint, The Sweeney, Armchair Mystery Theatre, and Target. He has helped to create several programmes of the genre, including Adam Adamant Lives!, Man in a Suitcase, and Shoestring.

Despite a career that has been largely spent writing for the crime and detective genre, in 1994 he won the prize for best situation comedy from the Writers' Guild of Great Britain for Outside Edge, a programme he had originated as a stage play. Although the majority of his work has been for television, a substantial amount of his output has been for the stage.

== Career ==
Harris began writing freelance episodes for British television in his mid-twenties. His first sale was to Sydney Newman's 1960 ITV series, Police Surgeon, for which he wrote the final episode, "The Bigger They Are". Although he wrote for the initial runs of The Avengers and The Saint, much of the early 1960s was dominated by his contributions to anthological mystery programmes like The Edgar Wallace Mystery Theatre. His attempts at comedy in the early 1960s, largely collaborative efforts with Dennis Spooner, including an episode of Tony Hancock's unsuccessful 1963 series for ATV, failed to establish either writer in the genre. According to Mark Lewisohn, their two failed pilots for Comedy Playhouse proved the two men were really more interested in writing dramatic works.

Despite his commercial failures with Spooner, he continued to collaborate with others during his early career, including Adam Adamant Lives! (1966), whose pilot he wrote with Donald Cotton. By the end of the decade, he had contributed individual episodes to 20 series. From the late 1960s onward, producers began allowing him to write a number of "first episodes", effectively making him co-creator of a number of projects like The Gamblers and Life and Death of Penelope. Despite having turned a number of ideas into initial scripts, however, he only occasionally received on-screen credit as co-creator. This pattern is evident in two of his later shows, both adapted from literature. On The Last Detective, he is recognised as having "devised the series for television". On A Touch of Frost, he was not, although he wrote the entirety of the programme's first series.

Beginning around 1971, Harris turned his earlier comedic ambitions towards the stage. The majority of his comedic work, even if it later ended up film, derives from his career as a theatre dramatist. Throughout the 1970s, a new play of his would be produced almost annually. Though the frequency of his stage work slowed in later decades, his plays continued to debut into the early part of the 21st century.

While the majority of his career has been spent as a freelancer, he has been an occasional script editor, with shows such as Hazell.

He is an intermittent radio dramatist, and won the Giles Cooper Award for adapting his television script Is It Something I Said? in 1978. One of his plays, Stepping Out, has appeared in three different versions, ultimately allowing him the opportunity of a musical film adaptation released in 1991.

Harris has taken a number of literary characters and adapted them into ongoing series. The longest running of these are A Touch of Frost and The Last Detective, but he has also converted works including Mark Twain's The Prince and the Pauper into limited-run serials.

Because Harris is a near contemporary of the Irish actor Richard St. John Harris, his writing credits are sometimes erroneously ascribed.

=== Adaptations ===
Harris has adapted foreign works into English drama, such The Last Laugh, adapted from Kōki Mitani's 1996 play University of Laughs. He also adapted the Norwegian novel Orion's Belt into the dual-language film of the same name, which went on to win the inaugural Amanda for Best Norwegian Film in 1985.

== Writing credits ==
| Production | Notes | Broadcaster |
|---|---|---|
| Inside Story | "Return to Base" (1960) | ITV |
| Police Surgeon | "The Bigger They Are" (1960) | ITV |
| The Edgar Wallace Mystery Theatre | "Attempt to Kill" (1961); "Man Detained" (1961); "Locker Sixty-Nine" (1962); "On the Run" (1963); "The Main Chance" (1964) | N/A |
| The Avengers | "Square Root of Evil" (1961); "Hunt the Man Down" (1961); "The Winged Avenger" (1967); "Game" (1968); "The Interrogators" (1969) | ITV |
| Man Detained | Feature film (1961) | N/A |
| Attempt to Kill | Feature film (1961) | N/A |
| Locker Sixty-Nine | Feature film (1962) | N/A |
| Strongroom | Feature film (1962) | N/A |
| The Saint | "The Loaded Tourist" (1962); "The Pearls of Peace" (1962) | ITV |
| Call Oxbridge 2000 | "Episode #2.7" (1962) | ITV |
| Harpers West One | "Episode #1.5" (1961); "Episode #1.11" (1961); "Episode #2.6" (1962); "Episode #2.10" (1962) | ITV |
| On the Run | Feature film (1963) | N/A |
| Hancock | "The Early Call" (1963) | ATV |
| Ghost Squad | "The Last Jump" (1963) | ATV |
| Sergeant Cork | "The Case of the Stagedoor Johnnie" (1963) | ATV |
| The Plane Makers | "Always Another Saturday" (1963); "The Silent and the Damned" (1963); "Lover Come Back" (1963); "Who Goes First?" (1963); "All Part of the Job" (1963) | ITV |
| Comedy Playhouse | "The Plan" (1963); "The Siege of Sidney's Street" (1964) | BBC1 |
| Love Story | "The Frauds" (1963); "The End of the Line" (1964) | ITV |
| The Main Chance | Feature film (1964) | N/A |
| Foreign Affairs | "Episode #1.4" (1964) | ITV |
| The Hidden Truth | "A Question of Involvement" (1964) | ITV |
| Armchair Mystery Theatre | "You Must Be Virginia?" (1964) | ITV |
| Redcap | "Epitaph for a Sweat" (1964); "Strictly by the Book" (1966); "Information Received" (1966) | ITV |
| No Hiding Place | "Truth or Dare" (1965); "Hi-Jack" (1965); "What's All This Then?" (1965); "Charlie Come Lately" (1966); "Leo Did the Picking and It All Went Bad" (1966) | ITV |
| The Sullavan Brothers | "Incident" (1965); "Insufficient Evidence" (1965) | ITV |
| Pardon the Expression | "The Little Boy Lost" (1965) | ITV |
| The Wednesday Play | "Who's a Good Boy Then?" (1966) | BBC1 |
| Knock on Any Door | "Sunday in Prospective" (1966) | ITV |
| Mrs Thursday | "Margate Comes But Once a Year" (1966) / (written by) | ITV |
| Adam Adamant Lives! | "A Vintage Year for Scoundrels" (1966); "The Last Sacrifice" (1966); "The Doomsday Plan" (1966) | BBC1 |
| The Informer | "A Word in Your Ear Brother" (1966); "Let Sleeping Dogs Lie" (1967) | ITV |
| Drama '67 | "Drama '67: Cross My Heart and Hope She'll Die" (1967) | ATV |
| Armchair Theatre | "A Slight Formality" (1967) | ITV |
| The Gamblers | "Read 'em and Weep" (1967); "Arthur Through the Looking Class" (1967) | ITV |
| Man in a Suitcase | 29 episodes (co-written with Dennis Spooner, 1967–1968) | ITV |
| Sherlock Holmes | "Black Peter" (1968) | BBC1 |
| The Lady in the Car with Glasses and a Gun | Feature film (co-written with Sébastien Japrisot, Anatole Litvak and Eleanor Perry, 1970) | N/A |
| Fraud Squad | "Inquest" (1970); "Remission: Negative" (1970) | ITV |
| I Start Counting | Feature film (1970) | N/A |
| Shadows of Fear | "At Occupier's Risk" (1971) | ITV |
| Trial | "On the Evidence You Will Hear" (1971) | BBC2 |
| Suspicion | "I Can See Your Lips Move" (1971) | ITV |
| Public Eye | "The Man Who Didn't Eat Sweets" (1971); "The Man Who Said Sorry" (1972); "Horse and Carriage" (1972); "What's to Become of Us?" (1975) | ITV |
| Spyder's Web | 13 episodes (1972) | ITV |
| New Scotland Yard | "Prove It" (1972) | ITV |
| Hunter's Walk | "Disturbance" (1973); "Local Knowledge" (1973); "Reasonable Suspicion" (1973); "Care and Protection" (1973); "Kids" (1974) | ITV |
| Sporting Scenes | "When the Boys Come Out to Play" (1974) | BBC2 |
| Dial M for Murder | "Dead Connection" (1974) | BBC1 |
| Centre Play | "Is It Something I Said?" (1974) | BBC2 |
| Life and Death of Penelope | "The Discovery" (1976); "The Nightmare" (1976) | ITV |
| The Prince and the Pauper | 6 episodes (1976) | BBC1 |
| The Squirrels | "Burke in Clover" (1976); "The X Factor" (1976) | ITV |
| Murder Most English: A Flaxborough Chronicle | "Hopjoy Was Here" (1977); "Lonelyheart 4122" (1977); "The Flaxborough Crab" (1977); "Coffin Scarcely Used" (1977) | BBC2 |
| Cottage to Let | "Saving It for Albie" (1977) | ITV |
| Target | "A Good and Faithful Woman" (1978) | BBC1 |
| The Sweeney | "Down to You, Brother" (1976); "Trust Red" (1978) | ITV |
| Hazell | "Hazell and the Walking Blur" (1978); "Hazell and the Rubber-Heel Brigade" (1978); "Hazell and the Weekend Man" (1978); "Hazell and the Happy Couple" (1979) | ITV |
| Shoestring | 21 episodes (1979–1980) | BBC1 |
| Sunday Night Thriller | "Blunt Instrument" (1981); "The Business of Murder" (1981) | ITV |
| Outside Edge | Television film (1982) | ITV |
| Play for Today | "Dog Ends" (1984) | BBC1 |
| Orion's Belt | Feature film (1985) | N/A |
| The Adventures of Sherlock Holmes | "The Norwood Builder" (1985) | ITV |
| About Face | "Searching for Señor Duende" (1989); "This for the Half Darling" (1991) | ITV |
| Stepping Out | Feature film (1991) | N/A |
| The Darling Buds of May | "Christmas Is Coming" (1991); "Oh! To Be in England" (1992); "Stranger at the Gates" (1992); "The Season of Heavenly Gifts" (1992) | ITV |
| A Touch of Frost | "Care and Protection" (1992); "Not with Kindness" (1992); "Conclusions" (1992); "Widows and Orphans" (1994); "Nothing to Hide" (1994) | ITV |
| Outside Edge | 22 episodes (1994–1996) | ITV |
| The Last Detective | 5 episodes (2003–2004) | ITV |

== Awards and nominations ==
| Year | Award | Work | Category | Result | Reference |
|---|---|---|---|---|---|
| 1994 | Writers' Guild of Great Britain Award | Outside Edge | TV - Situation Comedy | Won | |
