= Etter Rubicon =

- Directed by: Leidulv Risan
- Produced by: Dag Alveberg
- Starring: Sverre Anker Ousdal; Toralv Maurstad
- Music by: Geir Bøhren; Bent Åserud
- Production company: Filmeffekt
- Release date: 10 September 1987
- Running time: 93 minutes
- Country: Norway
- Language: Norwegian

Etter Rubicon is a 1987 Norwegian thriller film directed by Leidulv Risan and starring Sverre Anker Ousdal and Toralv Maurstad. It was produced by Dag Alveberg and the film company Filmeffekt. The film is a political commentary about the Cold War and follows the aftermath of two children dying after a military exercise off the coast of Nordland and Troms.

== Cast ==
- Sverre Anker Ousdal as Jon Hoff
- Ewa Carlsson as Mona Axsen
- Ellen Horn as Maria Hamarøy
- Toralv Maurstad as Carl Berntsen
- Jack Fjeldstad as Thorvald Hoff
- Alf Malland as Arne Michelsen
- Jan Hårstad as Johnsen
- Bjørn Sundquist as Journalist Elvenes
- Christian Sampson as Martin Hamarøy
- Stein Erik Skattum as Tom Hamarøy
- John Ausland as Amerikan officer
