= Orion's Belt (film) =

- Norwegian DVD cover
- Directed by: Ola Solum (Norwegian version); Tristan de Vere Cole (English version)
- Written by: Richard Harris; Jon Michelet (novel)
- Produced by: Dag Alveberg; Petter Borgli
- Starring: Helge Jordal; Sverre Anker Ousdal; Hans Ola Sørlie; Kjersti Holmen
- Cinematography: Harald Paalgard
- Music by: Geir Bøhren; Bent Åserud
- Production company: Filmeffekt
- Distributed by: Kommunenes Filmcentral; New World Pictures
- Release date: 9 February 1985
- Running time: 103 minutes
- Country: Norway
- Languages: Norwegian; English
- Budget: 15 million kr
- Box office: 14.1 million kr

Orion's Belt (Norwegian: Orions belte) is a 1985 Norwegian dual-language, political action thriller film, directed by Ola Solum and Tristan de Vere Cole. It is based on Jon Michelet's 1977 novel by the same name. The film follows three Svalbard-based shabby seamen, played by Helge Jordal, Sverre Anker Ousdal and Hans Ola Sørlie, who discover a Soviet bearing station. They are subsequently targets of Soviet liquidation and American interrogation in an attempt to quiet them and retain the political status quo. The Cold War topics were a critique of the Norwegian policy of allowing a Soviet presence on Svalbard.

The film was produced by Dag Alveberg and Petter Borgli, and the script was written by Briton Richard Harris. Two versions of the film were recorded, a Norwegian cinematic film and an English-language television film. First Solum shot the Norwegian-language scenes, and then Cole shot the same scene with the actors speaking English. The entire crew and cast lived on board a ship which traveled through Svalbard and Finnmark during production. The theme music, Svalbardtema, was composed by Geir Bøhren and Bent Åserud and has become an anthem for Svalbard.

== Plot ==
Sverre Anker Ousdal, Helge Jordal and Hans Ola Sørlie with Sandy Hook in the background

The story centers around three seamen who conduct shady business on board their vessel, Sandy Hook. The film starts with two of them, Tom Jansen (Helge Jordal) and Sverre (Hans Ola Sørlie), taking tourists on a polar bear safari. During this trip and at a later scene at a pub in Longyearbyen, where Tom's girlfriend, Eva Jelseth (Kjersti Holmen) is introduced, the viewers are briefed on the politics of Svalbard and the large Soviet presence. The third seaman, Lars (Sverre Anker Ousdal), presents plans to freight a bulldozer to the mainland from Sarstangen. They have been instructed to dump the bulldozer underway as part of an insurance fraud scheme but have instead made arrangements to sell the vehicle on Greenland. While at port, Tom is called to visit Governor Bache (Jon Eikemo), who warns that he will be keeping an eye on them.

After a dramatic but successful delivery of the bulldozer to the purchasers, they return towards Longyearbyen. They report to Isfjord Radio to say they were caught in a storm but deviate on their route back to avoid returning too early. They get caught in actual bad weather and decide to pull up in a nearby island, Kjerulføya, north of Nordaustlandet. The following day they go ashore to find food but instead find a cable. They follow the cable until they find a Soviet bearing station. While at the station, they are discovered by the Russians. They return fire after being shot at, killing a Russian; Sverre is wounded.

They escape and decide to mix with the fishing fleet to avoid being spotted. However, they are intercepted by a seemingly civilian Russian Aeroflot helicopter, which turns out to be heavily armed and fires at the ship. Sandy Hook steers into a narrow bay, and the protagonists fire back, eventually destroying the helicopter with a firebomb. They continue to Kapp Dufferin, where they anchor. Tom rows to land to find supplies, but while he is on land, a Soviet helicopter bombs Sandy Hook, killing Lars and Sverre. Tom has to walk across Spitsbergen to reach Longyearbyen. After a long march through the wilderness, he reaches a closed mine and rides an aerial tramway for coal to Longyearbyen.

Tom wakes in hospital in the company of Bache. Tom's story of the ship's sinking is not believed, and he is sent to Oslo for interrogations by a United States colonel (Jon Ausland) and other American military personnel. In a scene at Holmenkollen Park Hotel, the Soviet ambassador and Norwegian minister discuss the consequences of public knowledge of the incident. Tom is offered a new identity and a job on board a foreign trade vessel. On his way to the port, he escapes from the military police by mixing with a carnival parade. Two endings of the film were made. The second one had a longer chase scene involving a rendezvous with Eva, but in both endings, Tom is killed. Whether this is done by Soviet or American intelligence is left as an open question.

== Production ==
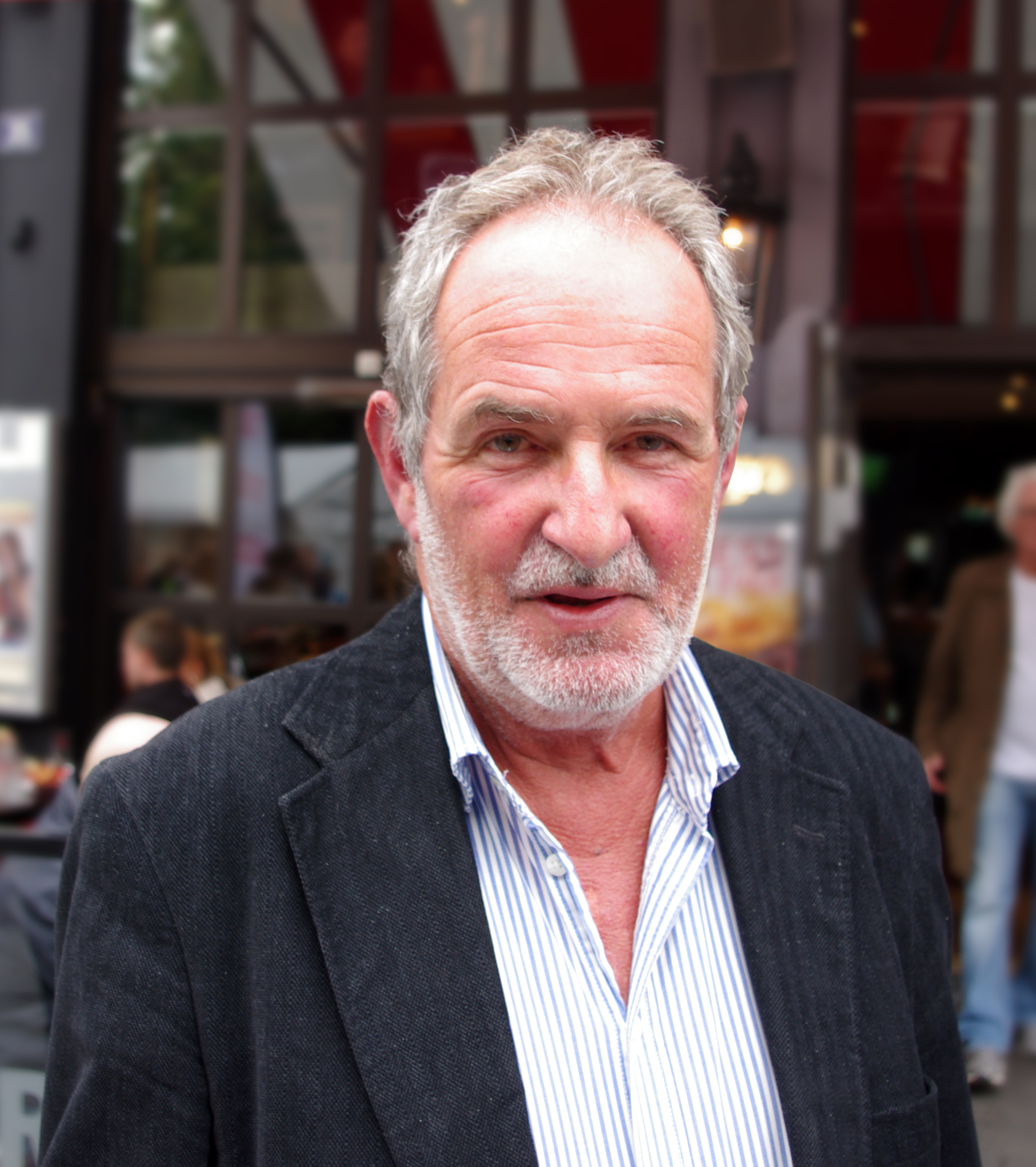
Jon Michelet in 2011

Jon Michelet's novel Orion's Belt was published by Oktober Forlag in 1977. The book's popularity in part arose from public interest in why 3,000 Russians were living on the Norwegian archipelago. The title refers to the idea that Svalbard was as central in a potential Cold War war theater as Orion's Belt, a central asterism in the constellation Orion. The novel also played on the fear of nuclear war and the lack of information from Norwegian media about the issue. The novel received mixed reviews. It was translated into English by Ellen Nations.

The initiative to dramatize the novel was taken by two prop masters, Dag Alveberg and Petter Borgli. They both invested half a million Norwegian krone (NOK) in the project, financed by mortgaging their homes. Neither had any experience as producers. Alveberg stated that his main motivation was him being tired of all Norwegian films being social realism. He stated that "the story could have taken place, and maybe it has taken place. We all know that the Russians do what they want on Svalbard." Alveberg first attempted to write the screenplay himself but was not satisfied. He presented the screenplay for the Norwegian Broadcasting Corporation; although they liked the project, they did not feel it was in the scope of the public broadcaster. Norway did not at the time have screenwriters of international standards, and Alveberg decided not to use his film as a training ground. He therefore hired the experienced British screenwriter Richard Harris.

Harris had a single meeting with Michelet in Oslo. At first Harris did not believe that there was a significant Norwegian left-wing grouping, nor did he realize that the Russian presence and the conflict in Svalbard was real. Michelet initially wanted Harris to include details such as Jansen's father being a war sailor and that he came from a working-class family, but Harris, with Michelet's understanding, dropped much of the personal backdrop to shorten the storyline. However, the screenplay is loyal to the novel's political stance. Harris never visited Svalbard, although he traveled to Finnmark.

Solum was selected as director based on the producers' experience with him from Carl Gustav, gjengen og parkeringsbandittene. The producers took more artistic decisions than was common at the time; for instance, they felt that Solum's choice of composer was wrong. During this discussion, the team was contacted by Geir Bøhren and Bent Åserud, who had read about the plans the newspaper, and sent a music sample to the team. Thus, the duo became the first choice of both the director and the producers. Tristan DeVere Cole acted as an assistant director in addition to directing the English scenes.

The production was organized as a polar expedition. The ferry MS Sognefjord was bought, rebuilt with living quarters and a cutting-room and renamed Orion. After production, the vessel was sold. The reason for using Orion was that there was only one hotel on the archipelago and no place for a film crew. Although this decision required supplies for three months to be brought along, it allowed the team to film at various remote locations on the islands and allowed travel while the film crew were sleeping. Up to 60 people lived on board. The vessel SS Listein was bought and used as the protagonist's ship, Sandy Hook. Filming was undertaken both along the Finnmark coast and in Svalbard. The planning concluded one and a half years before production began.

The film was made in two versions: a cinematic version in Norwegian and a television version in English. First Solum would direct a scene in Norwegian, and it would be shot. After he was satisfied, Cole would take over and shoot the same scene with the same actors, but with English dialog. The actors' accents were good enough that it did not need to be dubbed, while sufficiently noticeable to make the film exotic and authentic. A documentary about the production was shot concurrently.

Sandy Hook was blown up and sunk during one scene. 30 kilograms (66 lb) of dynamite were placed on board, and the explosion and sinking were filmed with six cameras. Just after the fuse was lit and the crew were abandoning the ship, it was discovered that the Coastal Steamer was going to pass. To not wreck the scene, Borgli ran below deck and cut the fuse. The scene in which Sandy Hook is attacked by the helicopter while in a narrow bay was filmed at Kjøllefjord, Finnmark. The helicopter used was Norwegian but painted in Russian Aeroflot livery. The helicopter was only available that day, but the captain on the vessel was drunk and refused to run it into the bay to film the scenes.

Only a single Russian is shown with his face in the film, with the rest of the antagonists being faceless Soviets, particularly the helicopter. The original ending was created as a compromise resulting in a closing deadline and lack of funding yet keeping the ending open. After the premiere, a new ending was filmed, which weaved the storyline better together. The second version also trimmed 10 minutes from the film's beginning.

== Financing ==
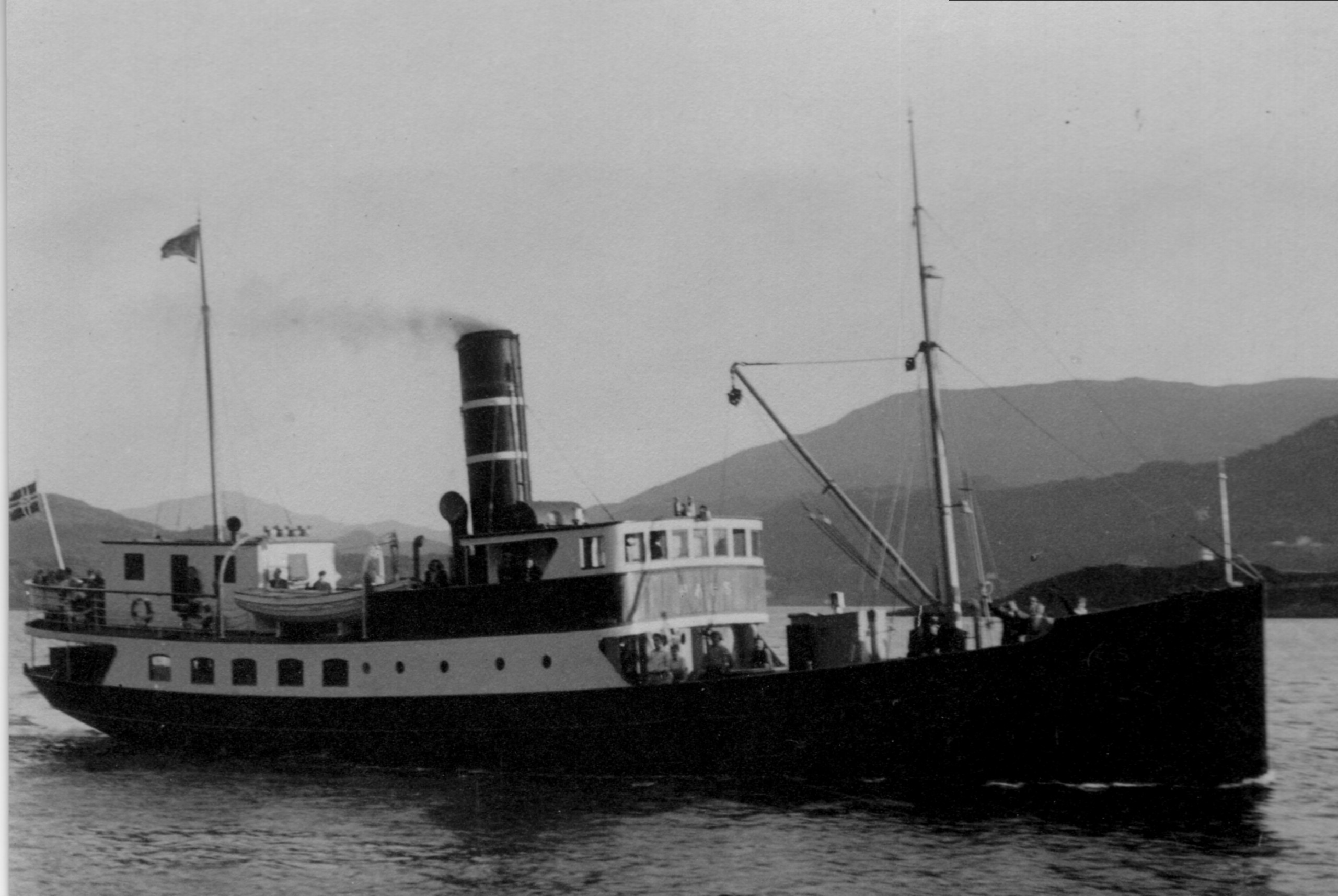
SS Haus in 1952, later SS Listein, which was used as Sandy Hook during the film

In the early 1980s, Minister of Culture Lars Roar Langslet increased subsidies for Norwegian film. In addition to increased focus on quality and costs, the system encouraged films to be organized as a kommandittselskap (KS)—a model from the shipping and petroleum industry where each ship was owned by its own KS and had a mix of limited and unlimited liability. This resulted in an increase of private capital to invest in films. While the 1970s had been dominated by dramatizations of classical novels and popular plays, the 1980s saw inspiration from Hollywood.

Work on financing the film started in 1982. Alveberg and Borgli established the production company Filmeffekt and hired Scanbroker to secure financing through KS Orion Film. The business magazine Økonomisk Rapport warned against investing in the film, characterizing it as an unrealistic "castle in the sky". In December 1983, the Embassy of the Soviet Union lodged an official complaint against the filming of Orion's Belt, accusing it of being a cover for military activity. The complaint was plainly rejected by the Norwegian Ministry of Foreign Affairs.

The film received problems when applying for state grants from Statens Filmproduksjonsutvalg. Though the screenplay was regarded as exceptionally good by independent consultants, it was given as the reason for the initial rejection. Minor modifications were made, after which the board argued that the Norwegian film industry was too small for such a project and that an action film, with a potential for international viewership, was beyond the mandate of the board. Part of the film industry wanted the board to give Orion's Belt and another film equal recommendations to force the government to make a film-political decision, but the board twice ranked Orion's Belt second. In mid-1983, the film was awarded grants of NOK 6.4 million of a budgeted cost of 10.5 million. Private financing of the KS was completed in 1984. By then the cost estimates had escalated to NOK 15 million, largely because of the delays.

Orion's Belt was the first film to be financed as a KS, with some investors investing capital and others only guaranteeing. The state grants were structured in such a way that had the film been withdrawn from the cinemas after a revenue of NOK 5 million, all investors would have received more money at the expense of the state. This was in part because increased grants reduced the tax advantage of the KS model. Subsequently, the rules were changed to increase the incentive to make a high-grossing production. The tax rules also caused problems for Alveberg and Borgli in financing their next film, Etter Rubicon.

== Reception ==
Aftenposten criticized the narrative for placing the climax in the middle. The newspaper characterized the actors as playing amateur theater but praised the action scenes and cinematography. In contrast, Verdens Gang praised the film, characterizing the three main actors as meeting international standards and maintaining the spirit of Michelet. It gave the film a five of six ranking. Nordlys commented on the realism of the film's topic. It criticized the special effects, which it stated there were less of than in foreign films, and the long time before the story was understood. Yet it praised the suspense which was maintained throughout the film and felt Holmen gave the best acting performance. Adresseavisen stated that the film was "too good to be Norwegian". It praised the film for its exciting story, for illustrating how Norway was part of the Cold War and how unimportant a single human is in superpower politics. It commented that Michelet was a political author, which allowed him to problematize political issues which were not acceptable for public debate. It also agreed with Harris' choice to remove all flashbacks.

Dagbladet commented that the film downplayed the left-wing political aspect of the book and instead focused on the storyline and action. It commented that with increased funding for special effects, Solum was able to achieve his true potential as an action director. It praised Paalsgard for the cinematography and the natural integration of nature footage and backdrops. Following the presentation of the shortened and new ending version, Dagbladet stated that "they could just as well have kept the old one". Klassekampen praised the film for its action and accepted that it had reduced the amount of intrigue in the novel. The character of Jansen was applauded, as it showed how small an individual is against the superpowers. As the only newspaper, Klassekampen praised the film music. Variety stated that the film was "a superbly mounted, convincingly told adventure thriller. Action scenes, such as the helicopter attack, are excitingly staged, and the suspense never lets up. As the rugged Tom, Helge Jordal is very good." However, the magazine criticized the title.

The film took a hat-trick at the inaugural Amanda Award, Norway's premier film awards. It won for best feature film, Jordal won for best male actor, and Bøhren and Åserud won for best film music. Orion's Belt was nominated for best film at the International Mystery Film Festival of Cattolica, and Ola Solum won the award for best direction. The composers were awarded the 1986 Film Critics' Prize for the music. In 2007, Dagbladet ranked Orion's Belt as Norway's tenth-most important film.

In May 2012, Tomas Backström announced plans for a remake of the film. He stated that he had secured half the necessary NOK 40 million in financing and that he hoped for state grants for the rest. Actors planned for the remake include Aksel Hennie, Nicolai Cleve Broch, Ola Rapace and Tuva Novotny.

== Distribution ==
The cinema version was distributed by Kommunenes Filmcentral in Norway and New World Pictures internationally. The film received a 16-year rating in Norway and Finland, and a 15-year rating in Sweden. In the United Kingdom and the United States, it was rated Parental Guidance. Orion's Belt premiered on 8 February 1985 at eight cinemas in seven Norwegian cities.

In Norway, 700,000 people saw the film at the cinema; it grossed NOK 14,172,994 in Norway and slightly less than NOK 3 million abroad. A third version of the film was made later, aimed at the American cinema market. It was a dubbed version of the Norwegian recording but had a slightly different ending.

The first DVD version was produced in 2004. The issue was criticized for not removing film grain and for cropping the image to 4:3 instead of 16:9. It further did not feature improvements to the sound and was available only in stereo. Subtitles were absent, despite the fact that some lines of the Norwegian-language version were in English. It did not include bonus material, the English-language version or the alternative ending. On 21 September 2005, Norsk Film published a new DVD version. The film was cleaned up and shown in widescreen, with the audio being digitally remastered and presented in Dolby 5.1 and DTS. Bonus material included in the release included the full English-language version, a 40-minute documentary on the production, two commentary tracks and new interviews with the main contributors.

== Music ==
The music for the film was composed by Geir Bøhren and Bent Åserud. They traveled to Svalbard to gather inspiration and found that the lack of vegetation distorted one's sense of direction. Inspiration was gathered more from the associations of the nature and culture in Svalbard, rather than that of a traditional action film. This included such elements as listening to whale and Inuit song. For the storm scenes, the team made a Richard Wagner-inspired piece, which was distinct from the Inuit-inspired music. At the end of the piece was a flute melody, which was then adapted to become the theme song, Svalbardtema. Although the music was not mentioned in the original reception, it later became very popular and has become a de facto anthem for the archipelago. Bøhren and Åserud established themselves as film music composers with Orion's Belt and composed the music for nearly all of Solum's later films.
