= Stepping Out (1991 film) =

1991 film by Lewis Gilbert

- Theatrical release poster
- Directed by: Lewis Gilbert
- Written by: Richard Harris
- Produced by: John Dark; Lewis Gilbert
- Starring: Liza Minnelli; Shelley Winters; Bill Irwin; Ellen Greene; Julie Walters; Robyn Stevan; Jane Krakowski; Sheila McCarthy; Andrea Martin; Carol Woods
- Cinematography: Alan Hume
- Edited by: Humphrey Dixon
- Music by: Peter Matz
- Distributed by: Paramount Pictures
- Release date: October 11, 1991
- Running time: 109 minutes
- Country: United States
- Language: English
- Budget: $12 million
- Box office: $246,000

Stepping Out is a 1991 American musical comedy film directed by Lewis Gilbert, written by Richard Harris (based on his 1984 play Stepping Out) and starring Liza Minnelli.

== Plot ==
Mavis Turner conducts instruction in tap dancing inside a Buffalo, New York church basement. Once an aspiring Broadway hoofer, Mavis is now merely trying to make ends meet, while also struggling with a personal relationship with a career-frustrated musician boyfriend.

With the glum Mrs. Fraser accompanying on piano, Mavis tries to teach tap to a class of colorful women and a solitary man, the bashful Geoffrey. Few are aware at first that one woman, Andi, is seeking a form of escape from a physically abusive husband. Others with a variety of extroverted personalities attend class simply for their own amusement, occasionally getting on each other's nerves.

Concerned about money and keeping the class going, Mavis learns of a talent competition and persuades the group that it can compete. While dealing with their personal issues, the "Mavis Turner Tappers" end up performing a glamorous, glitzy number on stage, flawed but rewarding to all.

== Cast ==
Most of the cast are Broadway-level actors and performers, several of whom have won Tony Awards, specifically Minnelli, Jane Krakowski, Andrea Martin, Bill Irwin and Ellen Greene (nominee). Shelley Winters and Minnelli are Academy Award winners, and Walters is an Oscar nominee as well as being a BAFTA and Golden Globe Award winner. Carol Woods was the only member of the Broadway cast to appear in the film.

- Liza Minnelli as Mavis Turner, a former Broadway dancer and singer who teaches a tap class in Buffalo, New York
- Bill Irwin as Geoffrey, a shy insurance salesman, and the only man in the group
- Ellen Greene as Maxine, a cute, funny, and slightly wild mom
- Robyn Stevan as Sylvia, a loud-mouthed buddy of Rose.
- Jane Krakowski as Lynne, a sensitive Registered Nurse, one of the best dancers
- Sheila McCarthy as Andi, a mousey, insecure battered wife
- Andrea Martin as Dorothy, a naive but sincere housewife with an allergy problem
- Julie Walters as Vera, a wealthy but inadvertently abrasive woman
- Carol Woods as Rose, a vibrant woman with a teenage son who gets into trouble
- Shelley Winters as Mrs. Glenda Fraser, a dour rehearsal pianist
- Luke Reilly as Patrick, Mavis's conceited, insensitive boyfriend
- Nora Dunn as Pam, director of the upscale dance center, a rival to Mavis
- Eugene Robert Glazer as Frank, Andi's husband
- Géza Kovács as Jerry
- Raymond Rickman as Alan

== Differences between play and film ==
The setting of the play was transferred from a gritty North London suburb to gritty Buffalo, New York. Mavis's backstory was expanded to allow her a chance to sing more (in the play she has a role equal to those of the students).

The students' personalities are generally the same on stage and screen, with minor changes. For example, Rose was initially a Trinidadian, a significant immigrant population in London. Any character outside the class is an addition for the film, as well as any scene outside the classroom and the final production number.

John Kander and Fred Ebb wrote a new song for the film, the title number, which is given a presentation at the film's end, in which the formerly awkward troupe reveal themselves to now be polished performers.

== Reception ==
In the 1970s, after the great success of her film, Cabaret, for which she won the Oscar for Best Actress, Minnelli starred in three films, Lucky Lady, A Matter of Time, and New York, New York, all of which failed at the box office. In 1981, she co-starred with Dudley Moore in the hit comedy film Arthur. After that, in 1988, she teamed with Burt Reynolds in the film Rent-a-Cop and again with Moore in the comedy Arthur 2: On the Rocks, both of which were financial failures.

Originally Stepping Out was to be released in the spring of 1991 to coincide with Minnelli's New York concert stage show Live from Radio City Music Hall, but because of a corporate restructuring at Paramount Pictures, the film's opening was delayed until the fall of 1991. Minnelli was interviewed on both Donahue and The Joan Rivers Show, and she and the cast of Stepping Out (minus Ellen Greene and Julie Walters) appeared on The Sally Jessy Raphael Show to promote the film. On October 4, 1991, Stepping Out officially premiered in only a small group of theatres in the United States thereby only attracting small audiences. It garnered decent reviews, but due to its limited release, the film only grossed a total sum of $246,000 and then went straight to video.

In reviewing the film for The New York Times, critic Stephen Holden wrote: "Because the movie adaptation was conceived as a star vehicle for Ms. Minnelli, the actress is given two solo dance turns, choreographed by Danny Daniels, in addition to her acting chores. Both numbers jerk the movie, which is never particularly believable, into the realm of pure show-business fantasy, while allowing the star to demonstrate real pizzazz as a modern-day vaudevillian trouper. The final number... is an appealingly brassy, new made-to-order song by John Kander and Fred Ebb. It puts the icing on a movie that is the contemporary equivalent of a Mickey Rooney-Judy Garland 'let's put on a show' romp, seasoned with a dash of 'A Chorus Line'."

Variety, in its 1991 review, described the film: "It's Liza-as-you-love-her in Stepping Out, a modest heartwarmer about a bunch of suburban left-feeters getting it together for a charity dance spot. Fragile ensemble item often creaks under the Minnelli glitz, but results are likeable enough."

Roger Ebert said, "The [stage play] contained more dancing and was generally more engaging, maybe simply because it was on the stage. As a song-and-dance picture, it talks too much. As a drama, it's superficial and locked into a formula."

== Awards ==
Julie Walters was nominated for a BAFTA film award in the Best Supporting Actress category.

== Home media ==
The film was released on VHS and DVD in the UK and the US. No Blu-ray has been released for the film and is not available from streaming sites. It is available for purchase on Apple (Australia and United Kingdom). It came out on DVD in Australia in March 2021.

== Soundtrack ==
Stepping Out

Soundtrack album by Liza Minnelli
- Released: 1991
- Genre: Showtunes
- Language: English
- Labels: Milan, BMG
- Producer: Peter Matz

Liza Minnelli chronology
Results (1989)	Stepping Out (1991)	Live from Radio City Music Hall (1991)

Professional ratings
Review scores
Source	Rating
AllMusic	2.5/5 stars

The original soundtrack for the film was released by Milan Records in October 1991. The CD includes the entire soundtrack composed by Peter Matz, as well as two songs from the film performed by Liza Minnelli.

=== Track listing ===
No.	Title	Length
1.	"Stepping Out"	7:06
2.	"The Curtain Rises"	1:50
3.	"Mean to Me"	2:26
4.	"Andy and Geoff"	1:13
5.	"Show Overture" (Paramount Fanfare / Beyond the Blue Horizon / Isn't It Romantic / The Man on the Flying Trapeze)	1:55
6.	"Tango Toronto"	0:33
7.	"Broadway Memories"	1:33
8.	"Avant Garde"	0:54
9.	"Hot Rocks"	2:25
10.	"Dance Montage"	1:07
11.	"Trouble Here"	0:52
12.	"P.M. Country Blues"	1:16
13.	"Liza's Dance"	3:12
14.	"First Lesson"	0:39
15.	"Mean to Me" (instrumental)	1:57
16.	"Buffalo Juke Rock"	3:22
17.	"Concert: Happy Feet (With Taps)"	2:23
18.	"Concert: Happy Feet (Without Taps)"	2:27
19.	"Bows / End Credits (Medley)"	3:53
