= Blues in the Night (musical) =

- London Cast Recording
- Music: Various
- Lyrics: Various
- Book: Revue basis
- Productions: 1980: Off Broadway; 1982: Broadway; 1987: West End; 1988: Off Broadway

Blues in the Night is a 1980s musical revue conceived by Sheldon Epps. It was produced by Mitchell Maxwell, Alan J. Schuster, Fred H. Krones and M Squared Entertainment, Inc., and Joshua Silver (Associate Producer).

Set in a rundown Chicago hotel in 1938, the dialogue-free show focuses on three women's relationships with the same snake of a man, their interweaving stories told through the torch songs and blues of Bessie Smith, Johnny Mercer, Harold Arlen, Vernon Duke, Gordon Jenkins, and Alberta Hunter, among others.

== Productions ==
The revue originally was staged by Epps and Gregory Hines under the supervision of Norman René at the off-Broadway Playhouse 46, where it ran for 51 performances between March 26 and May 11, 1980. The original cast consisted of David Brunetti, Rise Collins, Suzanne M. Henry, and Gwen Shepherd.

After 13 previews, the Broadway production, directed by Epps, opened on June 2, 1982, at the Rialto Theatre, where it ran for 53 performances. Jean DuShon, Debbie Shapiro, Leslie Uggams, and Charles Coleman comprised the cast. The show was nominated for the Tony Award for Best Musical.

The West End production, staged by Steve Whately, opened on June 9, 1987, at the Donmar Warehouse, where it ran through July 19, 1987. Maria Friedman, Debby Bishop, Carol Woods, and Clarke Peters comprised the cast. With Peter Straker replacing Peters, it transferred to the Piccadilly Theatre, opening on September 23 and running through July 28, 1988.

The show was nominated for the Laurence Olivier Award for Best New Musical and Woods received a nomination for Best Actress in a Musical. The London cast album was recorded live during the August 25–26 performances at the Donmar.

A production ran at the Minetta Lane Theatre, New York City, from September 14, 1988, through to October 23, 1988, for 45 performances. The cast featured Carol Woods, Brenda Pressley, [Leilani Jones] and Lawrence Hamilton. In the early 1990s, Clarke Peters directed a touring production, starting at the Churchill Theatre in Bromley, South London, England. It featured Ricco Ross and Claire Martin.

The revue was presented at the Post Street Theatre, San Francisco, for eight weeks in July through September 2007. Maurice Hines played the role of "The Man in the Saloon", with Carol Woods, Freda Payne and Paulette Ivory as the three women.

In 2017, the show's 30th anniversary was celebrated at the Hippodrome Casino, London. The cast included: Ian Carlyle as The Man, Enyonam Gbesemete as The Lady, Cleo Higgins as The Woman and Bleu Woodward as The Girl.

In 2025, Arizona Theatre Company will present the show for a one-month run.

== Song list ==
Note: composers in parentheses

- "Am I Blue?" (Harry Akst, Grant Clarke)
- "Baby Doll" (Bessie Smith)
- "Blue Blue" (Bessie Smith)
- "Blues in the Night" (Harold Arlen, Johnny Mercer)
- "Copenhagen" (Charlie Davis)
- "Dirty No-Gooder Blues" (Bessie Smith)
- "Four Walls (and One Dirty Window) Blues" (Willard Robison)
- "I Gotta Right To Sing the Blues" (Harold Arlen, Ted Koehler)
- "It Makes My Love Come Down" (Bessie Smith)
- "I've Got A Date With A Dream" (Mack Gordon, Harry Revel)
- "Kitchen Man" (Andy Razaf, Alex Bellenda)
- "Low" (Vernon Duke, Milton Drake, Ben Oakland)
- "Lover Man" (Jimmy Davis, Roger Ramirez, Jimmy Sherman)
- "New Orleans Hop-Scop Blues" (Geo. W. Thomas)
- "Nobody Knows You When You're Down and Out" (Bessie Smith)
- "Reckless Blues" (Bessie Smith)
- "Rough and Ready Man" (Alberta Hunter)
- "Take It Right Back" (H. Grey)
- "Take Me For a Buggy Ride" (Leola Wilson, Wesley Wilson)
- "These Foolish Things Remind Me Of You" (Harry Link, Jack Strachey, Holt Marvell)
- "Wasted Life Blues" (Bessie Smith)
- "When a Woman Loves a Man" (Bernard Hanighen, Gordon Jenkins, Johnny Mercer)
- "Wild Women Don't Have the Blues" (Ida Cox)
- "Willow Weep for Me" (Ann Ronell)

== Critical response ==
Frank Rich in his New York Times review of the 1982 revival, wrote: "The sad truth is that not even the plainest theatrical formulas are as easy as they look - and Blues in the Night, the new revue at the Rialto, is the not-so-living proof. The 25 blues numbers in this show...are often first-rate. The stars – Leslie Uggams, Jean Du Shon and Debbie Shapiro – are talented. The format – no dialogue, a minimum of dancing – is a model of economy. Yet Blues in the Night proves a bland evening that mainly serves to remind us just how much imagination went into its seemingly similar, far more fiery predecessors. Sheldon Epps, who "conceived" the revue and directed it, may well be responsible for what's gone wrong, but his basic notion isn't bad: Blues is set in a cheap hotel in 1938 Chicago (modestly designed by John Falabella) where the three stars occupy separate, shabby rooms. Yet the women remain anonymous throughout – they are called simply Woman No. 1 and so on in the Playbill – and, even when they sing together, they don't interact."

== Awards and nominations ==
=== Original Broadway production ===
Year	Award	Category	Nominee	Result
1983	Tony Award	Best Musical		Nominated

=== Original London production ===
Year	Award	Category	Nominee	Result
1987	Laurence Olivier Award	Best New Musical		Nominated
1987	Laurence Olivier Award	Best Actress in a Musical	Carol Woods	Nominated
