= Stepping Out (play) =

Play written by Richard Harris

- 1986 Broadway production playbill
- Written by: Richard Harris
- Characters: Mavis; Vera; Maxine; Andy; Sylvia; Dorothy; Lynne; Rose; Geoffrey; Mrs Fraser
- Original language: English
- Setting: A dingy North London church hall

Premiere
- Date premiered: 25 September 1984
- Place premiered: England

Stepping Out is a play written by Richard Harris in 1984. It was produced in the West End, London, where it received the Evening Standard Comedy of the Year Award, and on Broadway, New York.

== Plot ==
The play concerns eight individuals from disparate backgrounds and with differing motivations who attend the same weekly tap dancing class in a dingy North London church hall. Despite the students at first treating the classes as social occasions, and showing little co-ordination, they later develop a level of skill and cohesiveness. The dance routines are the background for the focus of the play, the relationship and interaction of different people.

== Background ==
According to the play's writer, Richard Harris, the inspiration for the show came from his own wife, actress Hilary Crane: "My wife started her career as a dancer and she liked to keep her foot in, as it were, so she went down to the local dance class and when she came back she suggested that I should go and have a look as she felt there might be a play in it for me". Taking his wife's advice, Harris visited the local church hall, a setting very much like the one in the play, where a tap dance class was in progress. "My wife hadn't been to the tap dance class", he explained. "She went to join a modern dance group, so it was by pure luck that I happened to go there and look through the window when a tap dance class was going on. It struck me that they all seemed to be thoroughly enjoying themselves and I thought if I could capture that, the pleasure they are clearly getting out of the class, I might be a winner. So I spent a period researching and going to various dance classes and then wrote the play".

== Productions ==
The original production of Stepping Out premiered in 1984 at the Thorndike Theatre, Leatherhead, directed by actress Julia McKenzie with cast: Barbara Ferris (Mavis), Sheri Shepstone (Mrs. Fraser), Charlotte Barker (Lynne), Josephine Gordon (Dorothy), Barbara Young (Maxine), Gabrielle Lloyd (Andy), Ben Aris (Geoffrey), Diane Langton (Sylvia), Peggy Phango (Rose) and Marcia Warren (Vera). A tour of the production followed. The play opened in the West End at the Duke of York's Theatre, on 24 September 1984, and ran for nearly three years until 1 July 1987. It was awarded the Evening Standard Theatre Award for Best Comedy in 1984.

The play has been produced internationally, and a Broadway run began in 1987, opening at the John Golden Theatre on 11 January, running for 73 performances before closing on 15 March. It was directed by Tommy Tune; the cast included Pamela Sousa, Carole Shelley, Janet Eilber, Carol Woods, Cherry Jones and Meagen Fay.

A musical version, entitled Stepping Out—The Musical, with a book by Richard Harris, lyrics by Mary Stewart-David, music by Denis King, and starring Liz Robertson, opened at the Theatre Royal, Plymouth 7, November 1996 and then, following a tour, at the Albery Theatre in London in October 1997, Bill Kenwright producing. The show has been adapted for American audiences by Astrid Ronning and Nina Seely as One Night A Week.

=== Theatre tours ===
2009 UK touring production

Cast: Brian Capron (Geoffrey), Jessie Wallace (Sylvia), Rosemary Ashe (Mrs Fraser), Wendy Mae Brown (Rose), Carrie Ellis (Maxine), Susie Fenwick (Vera), Katie Kerr (Lynne), Johanne Murdock (Andy), Karen Traynor (Dorothy), Lucy Williamson (Mavis), Lucy Woolliscroft (Fairy/Understudy), Ian Ganderton (Understudy), Yasmin Pettigrew (Understudy), Felicity Butler (Understudy).

2010 UK touring production

Cast: Brian Capron (Geoffrey), Anita Harris (Vera), Katie Kerr (Sylvia), Janet De Vigne (Mrs Fraser), Wendy Mae Brown (Rose), Natalie Cleverley (Maxine), Catherine Millsom (Lynne), Johanne Murdock (Andy), Karen Traynor (Dorothy), Lucy Williamson (Mavis), Lucy Woolliscroft (Fairy/Understudy), Ian Ganderton (Understudy), Liz Jadav (Understudy), Felicity Butler (Understudy).

Both tours started their runs at the Leatherhead Theatre where the play was originally performed.

2011 – Derby Playhouse Production Directed by Steven Dexter Cast: Anita Louise Combe (Mavis), Rosemary Ashe (Mrs Fraser), Sophie Louise Dann (Vera), Michael Cahill (Geoffrey), Flik Swan (Andy), Kim Ismay (Sylvia)

==== 2016/17 UK tour and West End production ====
A new tour directed by Maria Friedman starred Amanda Holden (Vera), Angela Griffin (Sylvia), Tracey-Ann Oberman (Maxine), Tamzin Outhwaite (Mavis), Nicola Stephenson (Dorothy), Judith Barker (Mrs Fraser), Rose Keegan (Andy), Sandra Marvin (Rose), Jessica-Alice McCluskey (Lynne), Dominic Rowan (Geoffrey) with Janet Behan, Emma Hook, Katie Verner, Marcia Mantack and Nick Warnford as Ensemble.

The tour played 12–22 October at Theatre Royal, Bath, 24–29 October at the Richmond Theatre, 31 October – 5 November at Cambridge Arts Theatre, 8–19 November at Chichester Festival Theatre. The production then transferred to the West End at the Vaudeville Theatre from 1 March -17 June 2017.

The West End run at the Vaudeville Theatre from 1 March – 17 June 2017 starred Amanda Holden (Vera), Natalie Casey (Sylvia), Tracey-Ann Oberman (Maxine), Anna-Jane Casey (Mavis), Josefina Gabrielle (Mavis), Nicola Stephenson (Dorothy), Judith Barker (Mrs Fraser), Lesley Vickerage (Andy), Sandra Marvin (Rose), Jessica-Alice McCluskey (Lynne), Dominic Rowan (Geoffrey) with Janet Behan (understudy Andy & Mrs Fraser), Suzy Bloom (understudy Vera, Maxine & Dorothy), Emma Hook (The Medium and understudy Sylvia & Lynne), Marcia Mantack (The Wizard and understudy Rose), Katie Verner (understudy Mavis & Vera), Nick Warnford (Nigel and understudy Geoffrey).

=== Film ===
Stepping Out was produced as a film in 1991, directed by Lewis Gilbert, and starring Liza Minnelli, with Julie Walters who was nominated for a BAFTA Award.
