= Carol Woods =

American singer-actor (born 1943)

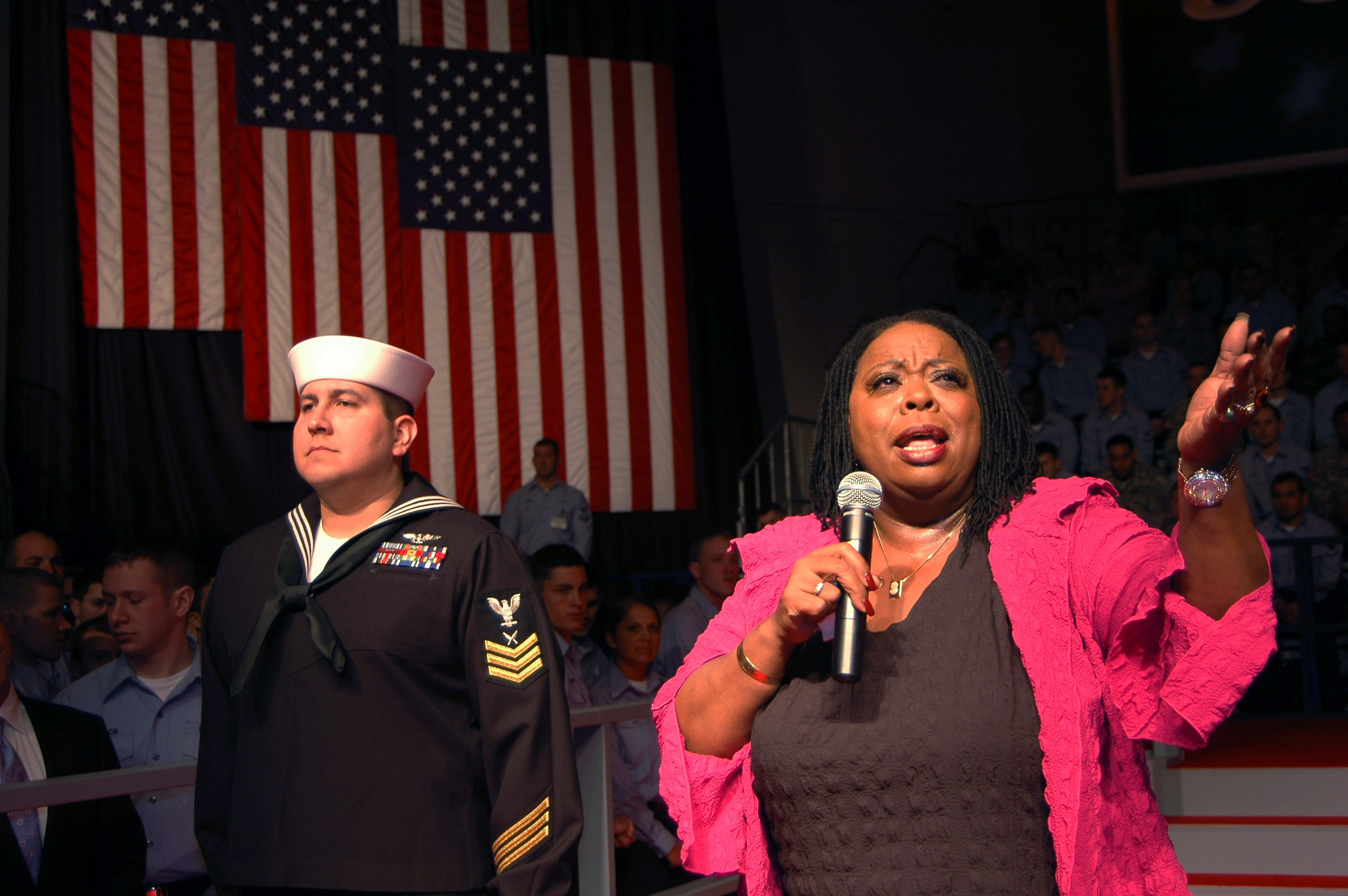
- Woods performing aboard the USS Kitty Hawk (CV 63) in 2007
- Born: November 13, 1943 (age 83); Jamaica, Queens, New York City, New York, U.S.
- Occupation: Actress
- Years active: 1983–present

Carol Woods (born November 13, 1943) is an American actress and singer. She is best known for her roles in Sweet and Lowdown (1999), The Honeymooners (2005) and Across the Universe (2007). In February 2008, she received a standing ovation during the 50th Grammy Awards broadcast singing "Let It Be" from the Across the Universe soundtrack, with Timothy Mitchum.

Inspired by Barack Obama's campaign and win, Woods recorded Grammy Award winner Julie Gold's song "America". The CD of America (The Song) made its debut in a Limited Inaugural Edition at the "Shades of Blue" Inaugural Gala, hosted by Create the Vision Source in Washington D.C. January 20, 2009. In July 2009, America became available to the public at large.

In early 2009, she reprised the role of Matron "Mama" Morton in Chicago on Broadway, followed by two weeks at the National Theatre (March 31 – April 12, 2009). She remained on tour with the show through June 2010, returning to the Broadway production in July. She is also recording material for a new CD titled Blues in the Night.

== Career ==
=== Theater ===
Carol Woods' Broadway theatre credits include Matron Mama Morton in Chicago, Stella Deems in the Roundabout Theater's 2001 revival of Stephen Sondheim's Follies, Mrs Crosby in Neil Simon's The Goodbye Girl (1993), and Maybelle in Grind in 1985. She also made a special guest appearance in the 2002 One Mo Time revival as Ma Reed. She was nominated for an Olivier Award for her role in the 1987 London production of Blues in the Night, which led to a NYC run at the Minetta Lane Theater, and in 2008 reprised the role in a San Francisco production. As a founding member of Tony Randall's National Actors Theatre, in 1992, Carol appeared in their first two productions A Little Hotel on the Side and as Tituba in The Crucible. She left Big River in 1987 to play Rose in the Tommy Tune-directed play Stepping Out. On tour, she recreated the role of Jeanette Burmeister in The Full Monty.

Off-Broadway, Woods is best known for her portrayal of Big Bertha in The Village Gate's 1979 production of One Mo' Time and its TV commercial where she sang part of "You've Got The Right Key But You're Working On The Wrong Keyhole" and viewers were invited to see the rest in person. In 1993, she portrayed Lorena Hickok in First Lady Suite at The Public Theater. In 1997, at the Samuel Beckett Theater, she appeared as Vy, Aladdin's mother in Dreamstuff, a contemporary musical spin on Aladdin.

Her regional theater credits include An Evening Dinner Theatre in Elmsford, New York, where she appeared as Jewel in The Best Little Whorehouse in Texas. At the McCarter Theater in Princeton, New Jersey, Woods appeared in C'mon and Hear: Irving Berlin's America (1994), A Christmas Carol (1996), Greensboro: A Requiem (1996). At Montclair State University in 1992 Woods repeated the starring role in Ma Rainey's Black Bottom, which she had played in London's Royal National Theatre three years earlier. During Theaterfest '94 she appeared in Side by Side by Sondheim, and during TheatreFest '98, Triplets: The Diva Musical with Ruth Brown, and Angela Robinson. For the Williamstown Theatre Festival, Woods appeared in Hot l Baltimore (2000).

=== Film ===
Her first film credit was as the infamous Aunt Bunny in Eddie Murphy Raw (1987). She reprised her stage role of Rose in Stepping Out, based on the play of the same name, with Liza Minnelli, Shelley Winters, Bill Irwin and Jane Krakowski. Rose's son in the film was played by Carol's real son Raymond Rickman. She performed at both the Toronto Benefit for Starlight during the filming and at the "Broadway Cares/Equity Fights AIDS" New York Premiere of the film.

In Sweet and Lowdown (1999), as Helen Minton, she sang All Of Me. In The Honeymooners (2005), she played Mama Gibson. She also appeared in Across the Universe (2007).

Having been directed by Jack Wrangler in cabaret, she appears as herself in the 2008 documentary Wrangler: Anatomy of an Icon. Woods is also featured in Steam as Ella, with Ruby Dee, and in When the Evening Comes (2009) (as Mrs. Anderson).

== Filmography ==
=== Film ===
Year	Title	Role
1991	Stepping Out	Rose
1992	Night and the City	Secretary
1996	Joe's Apartment	The Roach Chorus
1999	Sweet and Lowdown	Helen Minton
2001	Brooklyn Babylon	Cislyn
2003	The Blues	Aunt Patsy
2005	The Honeymooners	Alice's Mom
2007	Across the Universe	Gospel Singer
2007	Steam	Ella

=== Television ===
Year	Title	Role	Notes
1986	The Equalizer	Second Nurse	Episode: "Heartstrings"
1992	Law & Order	Ms. Price	Episode: "Cradle to Grave"
1993	Law & Order	Polly Fairfield	Episode: "Extended Family"
1995	The Parent 'Hood	Mrs. Wilcox	13 episodes (Season 1)
2000–2001	Third Watch	Lieutenant Rice	3 episodes
2002	The Practice	Maxine Shipp	Episode: "Neighboring Species"
2010	The Big C	Dorothy Jackson	Episode: "Divine Intervention"
2013	The Good Wife	Margaret Lorenzo	Episode: "Red Team/Blue Team" (S4.E14)

=== Stage ===
Year	Title	Role	Notes
1979	One Mo' Time	Bertha (Replacement)	The Village Gate, Off-Broadway
1983	The Best Little Whorehouse in Texas	Jewel	Evening Dinner Theatre
1985	Grind	Maybelle	Mark Hellinger Theatre, Broadway
1987	Stepping Out	Rose	John Golden Theater, Broadway
1987	Blues in the Night	The Lady from the Road	Donmar Warehouse
1991	The Crucible	Tituba	Belasco Theatre, Broadway
1992	A Little Hotel on the Side	Lady	Belasco Theatre, Broadway
1993	The Goodbye Girl	Mrs. Crosby	Marquis Theatre, Broadway
1993	First Lady Suite	Lorena Hickok	New York Shakespeare Festival, Off-Broadway
1996	One Touch of Venus	Molly Grant	New York City Center, Off-Broadway
1997	Chicago	Matron "Mama" Morton (Replacement)	National Tour
1998	Triplets	Diva	Montclair TheatreFest
2000	The Hot l Baltimore	Mrs. Oxenham	Williamstown Theatre Festival
2001	Follies	Stella Deems	Belasco Theatre, Broadway
2001	45 Seconds from Broadway	Bessie James (Replacement)	Richard Rogers Theatre, Broadway
2001	The Full Monty	Jeanette Burmeister	National Tour
2002	One Mo' Time	Bertha (Replacement)	Longacre Theatre, Broadway
2010	Chicago	Matron "Mama" Morton (Replacement)	Ambassador Theatre, Broadway
2013	They're Playing His Songs	Performer	The Cape Playhouse

== Recordings ==
- Bosom Buddies – with Karen Saunders
- Lost in the Stars
- Breakfast at Tiffany's
- Barcelona – While appearing in the London production of Blues in the Night, Carol befriended Freddie Mercury, who asked her to sing backup on his album
- Lead vocal on the song "Brighter Tomorrow" from trumpeter Tom Browne from his album Rockin' Radio

Three CDs in The Riverwalk Series: New Year's All Star Jam, American Love Songs and Hot Jazz For A Cool Yule. She also appears on the Cast Albums of Grind, The Goodbye Girl and Blues In The Night.

== Concerts and cabaret ==
The Village Gate
Songs in the Key of Stevie reunited her with Ron Richardson
The Stevie Wonder tribute was directed by Obba Babatundé
New Year's Eve Party with opening act Dianna Jones
Featured vocalist at Late Night Swing Shows
During One Mo' Time made frequent "guest" appearances in the Terrace Bar Cabaret
She continued this practice when she dropped in to see other performers, notably Emmy Kemp, until "The Gate" closed.

Carnegie Hall
An Evening with Carol Woods November 27, 2000
Benefit concerts for the Lauri Strauss Leukemia Foundation honoring Johnny Mercer (2001), Kander and Ebb (2003), and Marvin Hamlisch (2006).

92nd Street Y
Various Lyrics and Lyricists shows

Downtime
Her CD Bosom Buddies was recorded there live

Arci's Place
Stick Around ran from January 30 through February 24, 2001

Rainbow and Stars
'S Wonderful, 'S Marvelous, 'S Gershwin (1992) with Jo Anne Worley

Michael's Pub
Tribute shows to Sammy Davis Jr. and Pearl Bailey (1991)

Freddy's Supper Club June 1985

Nell's

B. Smiths

Iridium
