= Helge Jordal =

Norwegian actor

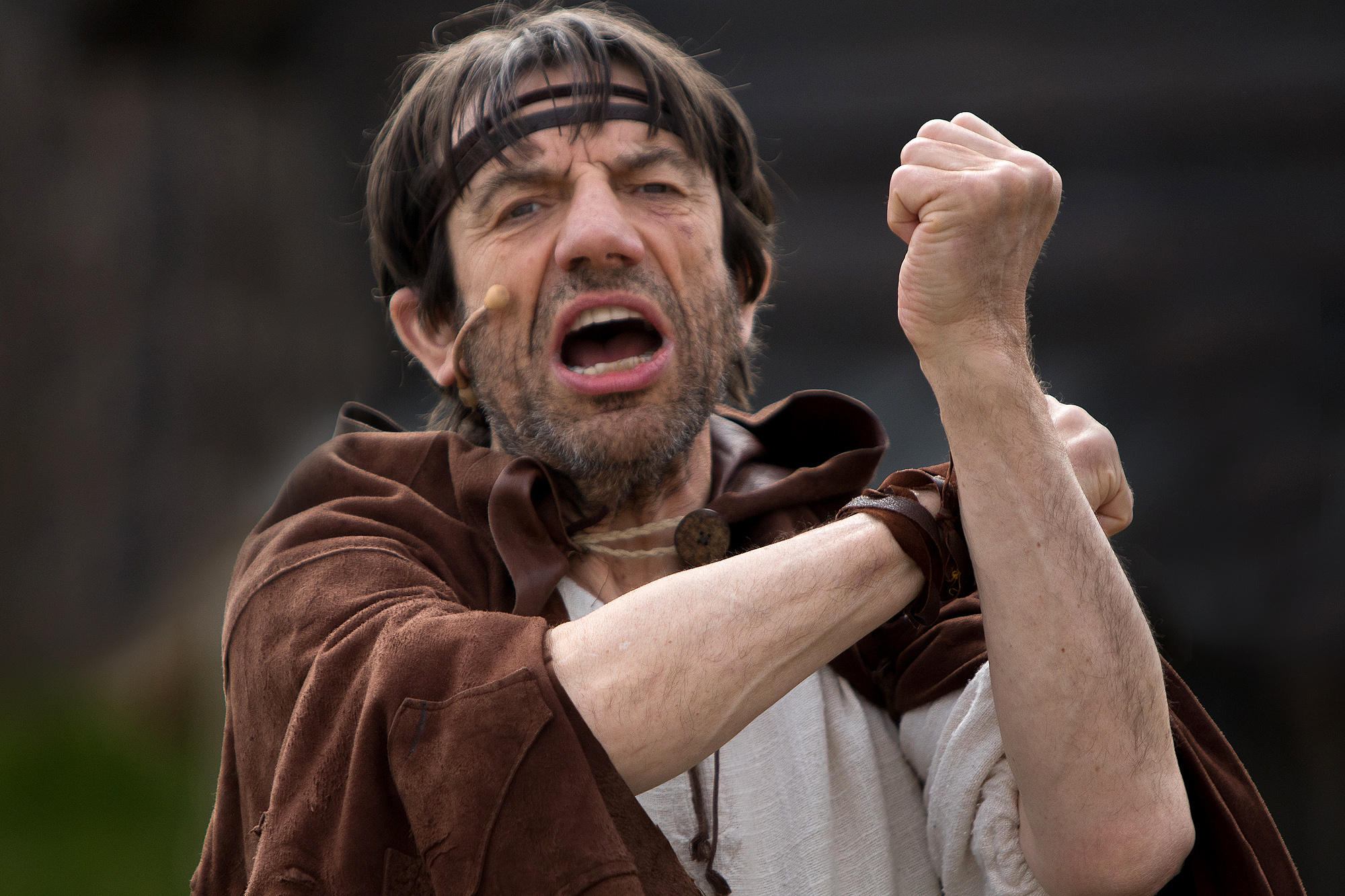
- Jordal in 2014
- Born: February 17, 1946 (age 80); Bergen, Norway
- Citizenship: Norwegian
- Occupation: Actor
- Spouse: Frøydis Armand
- Website: https://www.helgejordal.no/

Helge Jordal (born February 17, 1946) is a Norwegian actor. He was appointed a Knight of the Royal Order of St. Olav in 2006 for his long career as an actor both on screen and on stage, and for his position as a "grand old man" among Norwegian actors.

== Early life ==
Jordal was born in Bergen.

== Career ==
Since he graduated from the Teaterhøyskolen in 1972, he distinguished himself in several roles on the film screen, television, stage and cabaret theaters across the country. He was employed at the Nationaltheateret in Oslo (1972–77), Hålogaland Teater in Tromsø, before he came to the Den Nationale Scene (DNS) in Bergen (1981). He became a freelance actor in 1987, but has played significant roles in the DNS stage.

From the film world, he is among others known for the protagonist role in Orion's Belt (1985), for which he won both the Amanda Award 1985 for Best Actor and the Honorary Amanda in 2009, and Wayfarers (1989), both directed by Ola Solum. Many know him well from Frida – with heart in hand (1991), and he starred in film Vegas which premiered in September 2009.

== Honors ==
- Amanda award 1985 as Best Male Actor for his role in Orion's Belt
- Amanda Award 1989, the Honorary Award
- Royal Order of St. Olav 2006 for his long career as an actor on both screen and stage
