= Geir Bøhren =

Norwegian musician and film score composer

Geir Bøhren (born 9 June 1951) is a Norwegian musician and film score composer.

Bøhren co-founded the group Junipher Greene in 1966, where he was a drummer. The band started playing blues but later changed to progressive rock. It signed its first record contract in 1971. He graduated from the Norwegian Academy of Music in Oslo in 1977.

Along with Bent Åserud, Bøhren had his breakthrough as a film score composer for Orion's Belt with the theme Svalbardtema, which has become an unofficial anthem for Svalbard. With this score, they won the Amanda Award for best score and the Film Critics' Award. The duo continued to work closely with director Ola Solum, for which they made the score for nearly all his later works. Bøhren created, along with Åserud, the official anthem for the 1994 Winter Olympics. He has won the 1999 Spellemannsprisen for the record Jul i Blåfjell.
