= Politics of Svalbard =

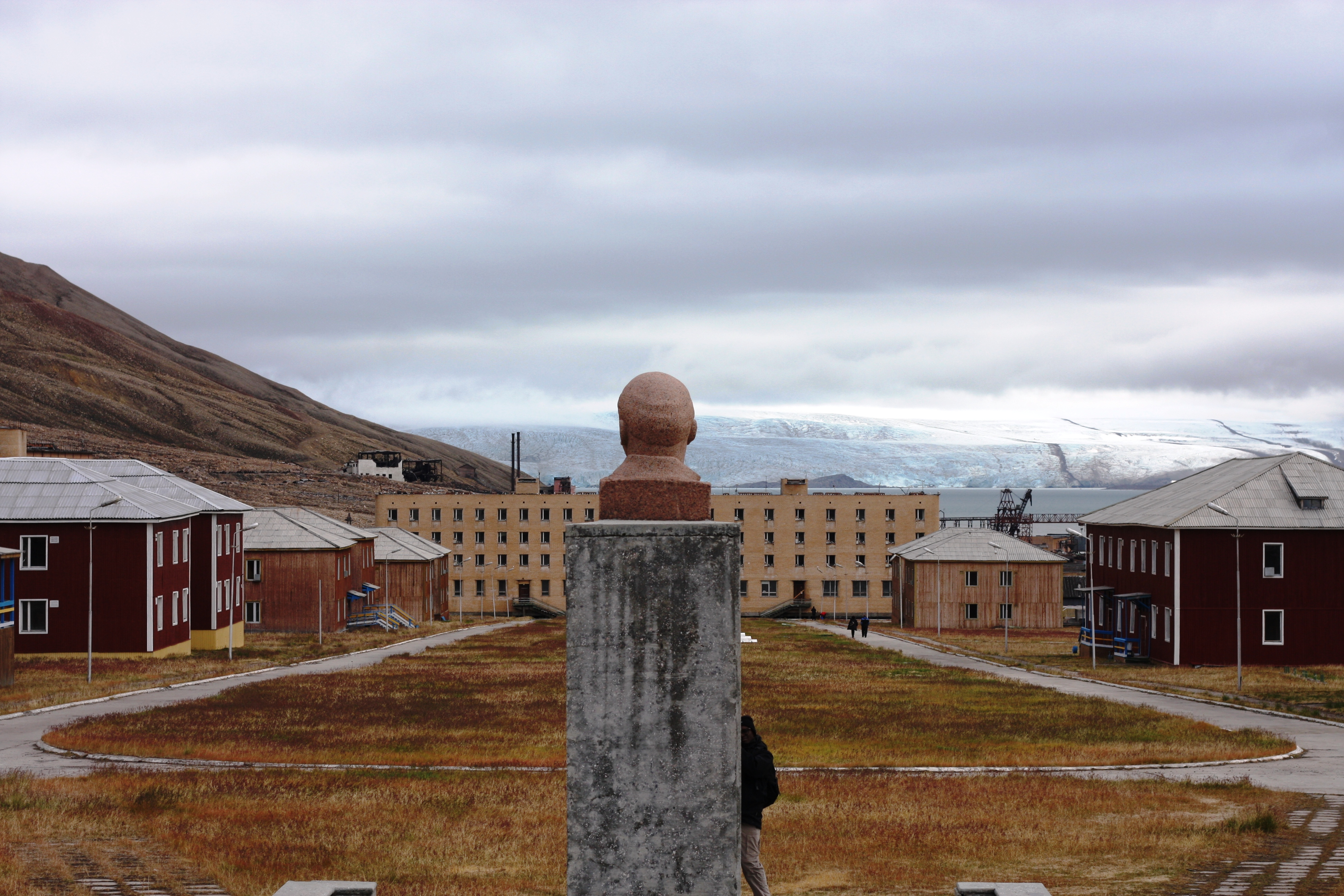
A statue of Lenin looking over the former Soviet mining community of Pyramiden, now a ghost town

Svalbard lies under the sovereignty of Norway, but the Svalbard Treaty places several restrictions. Norway cannot use the archipelago for warlike purposes, cannot discriminate economic activity based on nationality and is required to conserve the natural environment. Uniquely, Svalbard is an entirely visa-free zone. Everybody may live and work in Svalbard indefinitely regardless of country of citizenship. Svalbard Treaty grants treaty nationals equal right of abode as Norwegian nationals. Non-treaty nationals may live and work indefinitely visa-free as well. "Regulations concerning rejection and expulsion from Svalbard" is in force on non-discriminatory basis.

Public administration of the archipelago is the responsibility of the Governor of Svalbard, who acts as county governor and chief of police. The institution was established by and is regulated by the Svalbard Act, which also limits which Norwegian laws apply to the islands. Longyearbyen Community Council is the only elected local government and is organized similar to a mainland municipality. Other Norwegian government agencies with a presence are the Directorate of Mining and the Tax Administration. There are two diplomatic mission: one is the Consulate of Russia in Barentsburg and the other the Consulate of Switzerland in Longyearbyen.

The archipelago was spotted in 1596, and soon companies from England, the Netherlands, Denmark–Norway and France were whaling and hunting. Both England and Denmark–Norway claimed the land, while the Dutch and France claimed the mare liberum principle, resulting in Svalbard becoming terra nullius—land without sovereignty. Work on establishing a public administration started in the 1870s, but did not progress until the 1900s, when the establishment of coal mining communities created a more urgent need. The Svalbard Treaty was signed following the Paris Peace Conference in 1920, and the governor and act came into effect in 1925. By then only Norwegian and Russian communities remained.

After the Second World War and the outbreak of the Cold War, Svalbard became polarized with Norwegian and Soviet communities isolated from each other. Norway carried out a more defensive foreign policy on Svalbard compared to on the mainland, and foreign activity was held at a minimum. The Soviet Union issued protests against virtually all new Norwegian activity. At the time there were twice as many Soviet citizens as Norwegians on the islands. More than half the archipelago was conserved in 1973. Since the 1990s Longyearbyen has become "normalized", abandoned the company town structure and seen its population doubled. On the other hand, the Soviet communities have dwindled, with only a few hundred residents remaining in Barentsburg.

In Norwegian parliamentary elections, Norwegian citizens living in Svalbard are registered to vote in the county (and municipality) in which they were last considered resident. On 9 October 2023, the most recent election to the Longyearbyen Community Council, Svalbard's local government, was held. The results of 2023 elections led to the new head of the local council Leif Terje Aunevik from the Liberal Party (Venstre) who replaced Arild Olsen from Labour Party. Liberal Party got 7 seats in the council, while the Labour Party and Socialist Left Party got 3 seats each, and the Conservative Party got 2 seats. Due to the new electoral law, foreigners who haven't spent more than 3 years in mainland Norway, were not allowed to vote in Svalbard. This led to a decrease in votes from 1128 in 2019 to only 808 in 2023 and several dissatisfied residents of Longyearbyen.

== History ==
=== Terra nullius ===
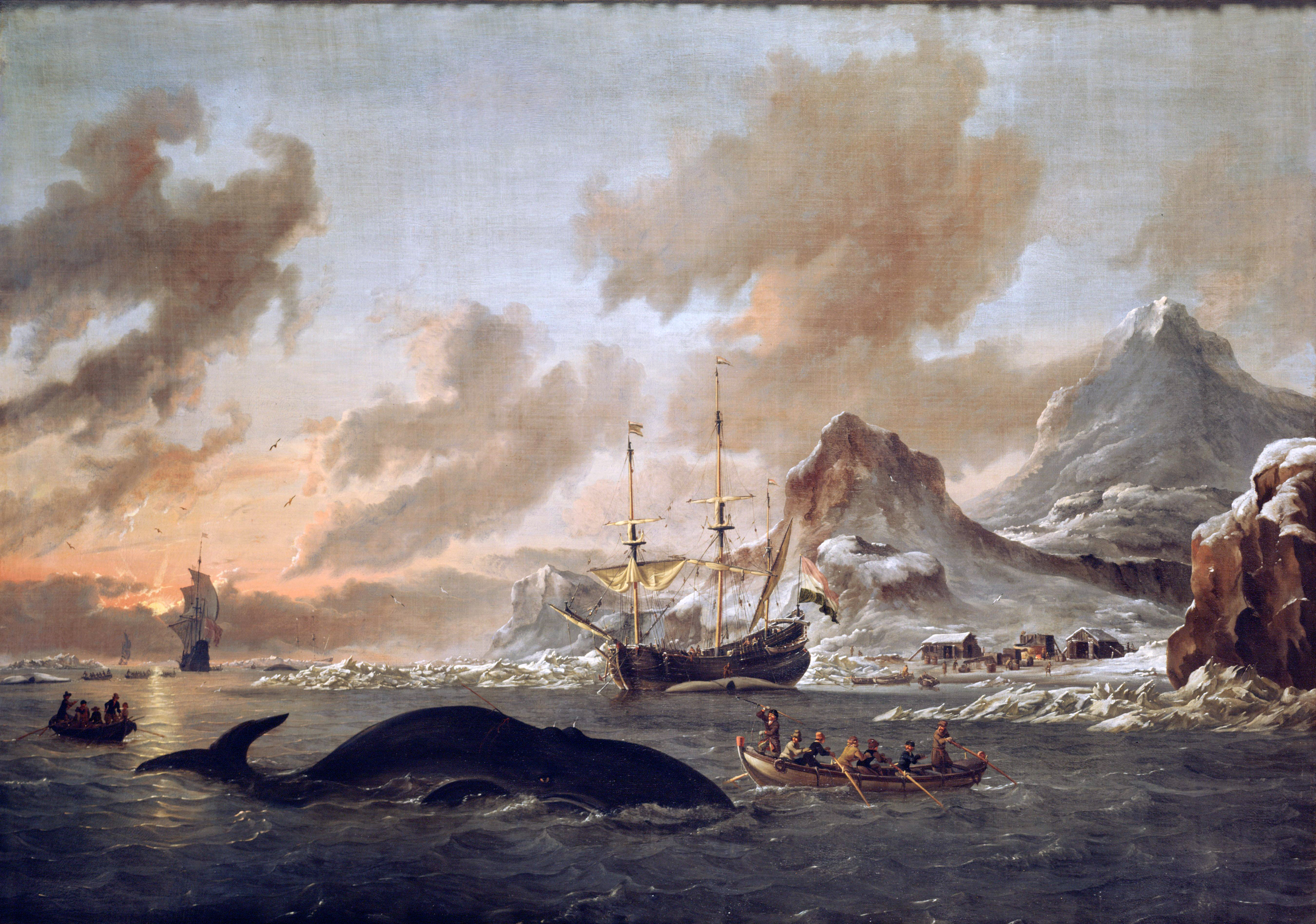
Abraham Storck's 1690 depiction of Dutch whalers

Svalbard was undoubtedly spotted by Willem Barentsz of the Netherlands in 1596, although it may have previously have been discovered by Norsemen or Pomors. The Muscovy Company of England started walrus hunting on Bjørnøya in 1604, and from 1611 the company's Jonas Poole started whaling around Spitsbergen. The following year the Muscovy Company sent a new expedition, but was met by both Dutch and Spanish whalers. The company claimed exclusive rights to the area and sent away the contenders. In 1613, seven armed English ships were sent on an expedition that expelled a few dozen Dutch, Spanish and French vessels.

This led to an international political conflict. The Dutch rejected exclusive rights for the English, claiming the mare liberum principle. Christian IV claimed that Denmark–Norway had the rights to all of the Northern Sea in lieu of Greenland being an old Norwegian tax-land, and it was believed at the time by all parties that Spitsbergen was part of Greenland. England offered to purchase the rights from Denmark–Norway in 1614, but the offer was rejected, after which the English reverted to their exclusive rights claim. Denmark–Norway sent three men-of-war in 1615 to collect taxes from English and Dutch whalers, but all refused to pay.

The English claimed sovereignty based on the false claim that Svalbard was discovered by Hugh Willoughby in 1553, that James I had annexed it in 1614 and that it was the English who had started whaling. The Netherlands stated that whaling could not be the basis for claiming sovereignty. The issue ended in a political deadlock, with Denmark–Norway and England both claiming sovereignty and France, the Netherlands and Spain claiming the archipelago a free zone under mare liberum. Although Denmark–Norway never formally gave up its claim to Svalbard, the archipelago continued to be a terra nullius—a land without a government.

The English and Dutch partitioned the island in 1614, as the aggression was hampering the profitability of both groups. That year the Netherlands created Noordsche Compagnie as a whaling cartel. After the Muscovy Company fell into financial difficulties some years later, the Noordsche Compagnie got the upper hand and was able to dominate the whaling and fend off the English. The company established itself in the northwestern corner of Spitsbergen (around Albert I Land) and only permitted a limited Danish presence. The English whaled further south, while the French were allocated to the north coast and the open sea. From the 1630s, the situation stabilized, and there were only a limited number of aggressive incidents. By the end of the 18th century, whaling had ceased as the bowhead whale had reached local extinction.

=== Establishing jurisdiction ===
Work on establishing an administration was initiated by Adolf Erik Nordenskiöld in 1871. After contacting the invested governments, he concluded that only Russia and Norway would object to an annexation of the island. Fridtjof Nansen's endeavors raised the Norwegian public's consciousness of the Arctic, which again brought forth public support for annexation of Svalbard. Industrialization and permanent settlements on Svalbard began in the 1900s with the introduction of coal mining. This resulted in the need for jurisdiction. Firstly, there was no means to make a mining claim legal. Secondly, there was a need for conflict resolution, particularly regarding labor conflicts, which often saw the mining company and the workers have different nationalities.

The Government of Norway took initiative in 1907 for negotiations between the involved states. Multilateral conferences were held in 1910, 1912 and 1914, all of which proposed various types of joint rule. The breakthrough came at the Paris Peace Conference following the First World War. Germany and Russia had both been excluded, while Norway enjoyed much goodwill after its neutral ally policy during the war and was at the same time seen as harmless. The Svalbard Treaty of 9 February 1920 granted Norway full sovereignty over Svalbard, although with two major limitations: all parties to the treaty had equal rights to economic resources, and the archipelago was not to be used for "warlike purposes".

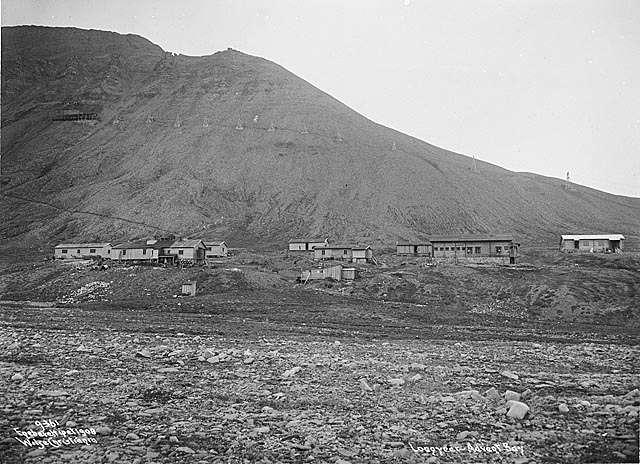
Longyearbyen in 1908

After significant political debate, a proposal to establish Svalbard as a dependency and administrate it from Tromsø was rejected. Instead the Svalbard Act specified that the islands would be administered by the Governor of Svalbard and were considered "part of the Kingdom of Norway", although not regarded as a county. The islands had until then been known as the Spitsbergen Archipelago, and it was at this time the term Svalbard was introduced. The legislation took effect on 14 August 1925. A mining code was passed in 1925, and by 1927 all mining claims, some of which conflicted, were resolved. All unclaimed land was taken over by the Government of Norway. Although the Soviet Union was initially skeptical to the treaty, its government was willing to sign in exchange for a Norwegian recognition of the Soviet regime. Until the Second World War, both the governor and the Commissioner of Mining were a single person, stationed on the mainland during the winter.

=== Cold War ===
Mining fell into an economic slump during the 1920s, resulting in several of the mining communities being closed. By the 1930s only Store Norske Spitsbergen Kulkompani and the Soviet state-owned Arktikugol were left, which led to a bilateralization of politics. The archipelago was evacuated during the Second World War and the major settlements leveled by Germany during Operation Zitronella. The Soviet Union proposed in 1944 that Svalbard become a condominium under joint Norwegian and Soviet rule, except for Bjørnøya, which would be transferred to the Soviet Union. Although the proposal was discussed in Norway, it was ultimately rejected in 1947. The Norwegian and Russian communities were largely built independent of each other and each had their own infrastructure, such as postal service, radio stations and transport. The Norwegian population stabilized at about 1,000 people, while there were about twice as many Soviets.

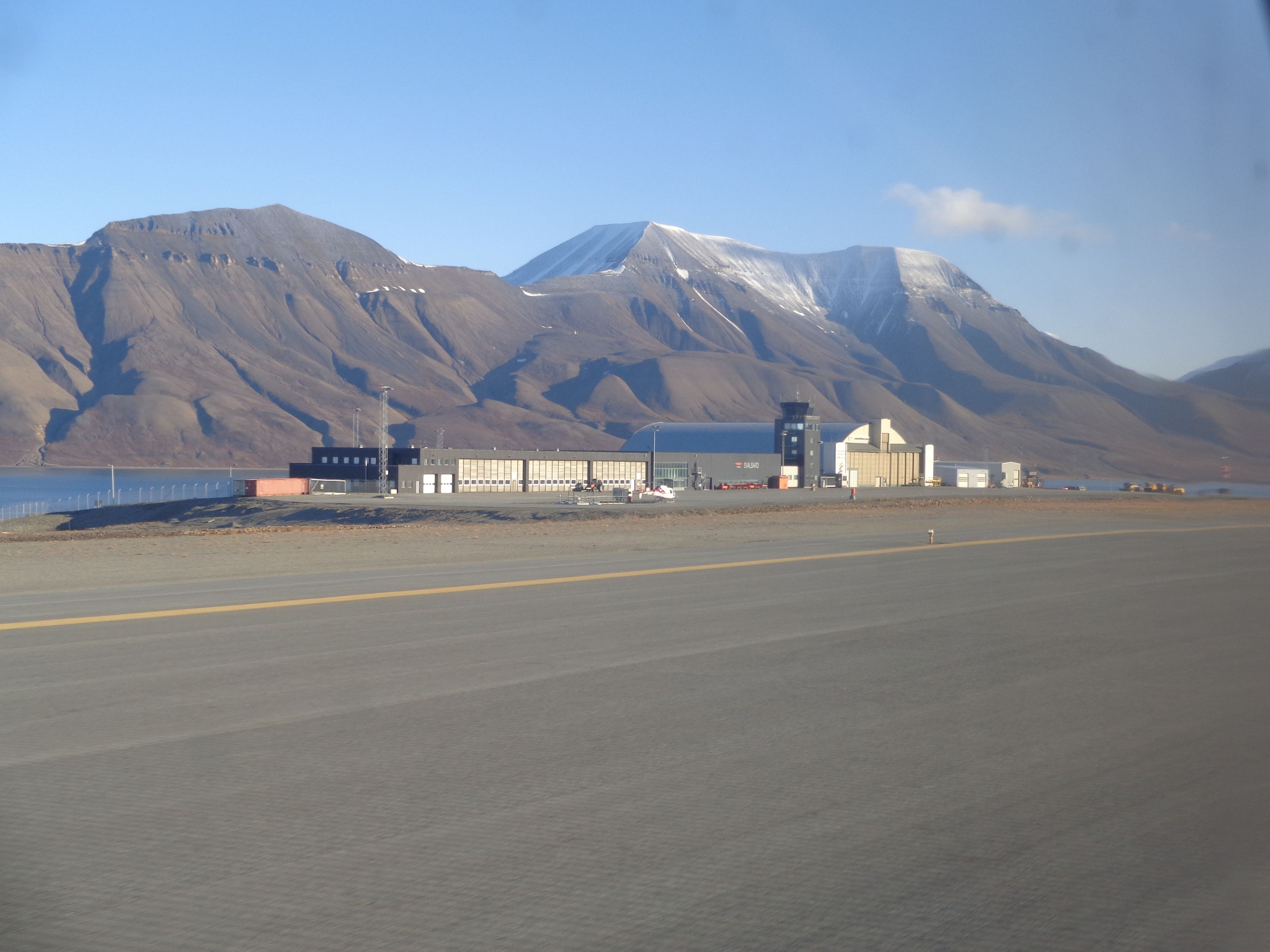
Svalbard Airport, Longyear

The political tension between Norway and the Soviet Union became heated after Norway joined NATO in 1949. The Soviet Union issued memorandums to Norway stating that Svalbard could not be under a NATO joint command, but this was rejected by Norway, and the issue laid at rest. A new protest was issued in 1958 after Norsk Polar Navigasjon proposed building a private airport at Ny-Ålesund, which was then actively opposed by the Norwegian government in order to not agitate the Soviet Union. New protests were issued against the establishment of the European Space Research Organization's Kongsfjord Telemetry Station, although the protests did not stop construction. A compromise about a Norwegian civilian airport was reached in 1971 and Svalbard Airport, Longyear opened in 1975, serving both Soviet and Norwegian towns.

Twenty-one miners were killed in an accident in Ny-Ålesund in 1962. The resulting Kings Bay Affair, where unsafe mining had been approved to maintain an increased Norwegian presence on Svalbard, ultimately led to vote of no confidence in Parliament and the withdrawal of Prime Minister Einar Gerhardsen's third cabinet. Oil drilling was started by Caltex in 1961. Caltex was granted claims based on indications of oil, rather than samples. Arktikugol was not granted claims based on similar evidence, contributing to tensions with the Soviet Union. Both the Kings Bay Affair and the Caltex Affair initiated public debate about the administration of Svalbard, and in particular the lack of resources and control of Soviet settlements. Funding for local and central administration was increased heavily, and the Governor increased its activities in Soviet settlements. More than half the archipelago was protected in 1972 through four national parks, fourteen bird sanctuaries and four nature reserves. Store Norske was nationalized between 1973 and 1976.

=== Normalization ===
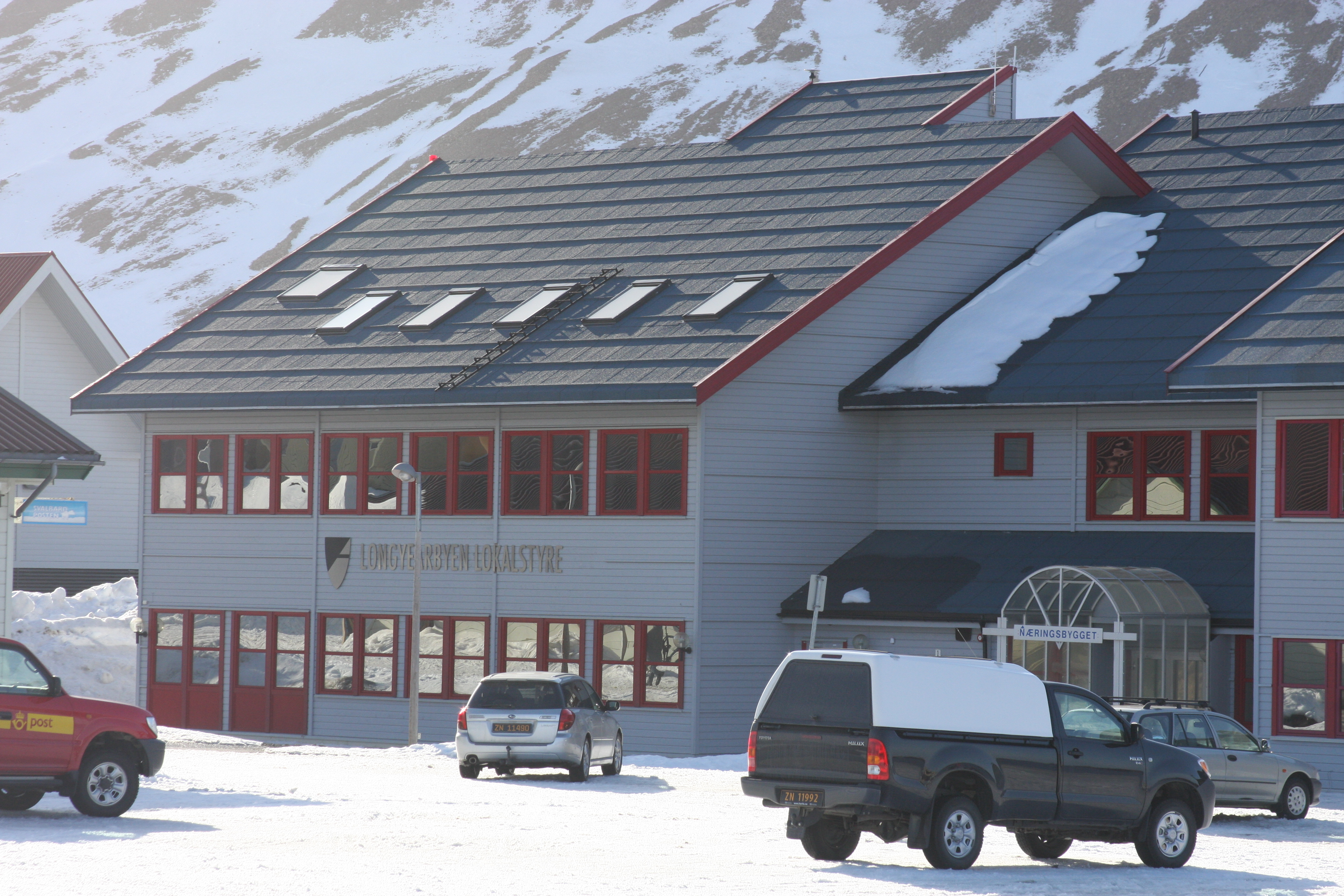
Longyearbyen Town Hall

The Svalbard Council was established on 1 November 1971. It consisted of 17 nonpartisan members who were elected or appointed from three different Norwegian groups—SNSK employees, government employees and others, although the ratio changed several times. Svalbard Samfunnsdrift (SSD), a limited company which was responsible for public infrastructure and services in Longyearbyen, was established by Store Norske on 1 January 1989. Responsibilities included healthcare, the fire department, the kindergarten, roads, garbage disposal, power production, the water and sewer system, the cinema, cultural actives and the library. Ownership of SSD was taken over by the Ministry of Trade and Industry on 1 January 1993. During the 1990s the authorities started a process to "normalize" Longyearbyen by abolishing the company town scheme and introducing a full range of services, a varied economy and local democracy. The Svalbard Council changed its regulations from 1993 and allowed parties to run for election. Longyearbyen Community Council was established in 2002, replacing the Svalbard Council and assimilating SSD. From 1990 to 2011, the Russian and Ukrainian population fell from 2,300 to 370, while the Norwegian population increased from 1,100 to 2,000.

== Legislation ==
The Svalbard Treaty was signed on 9 February 1920 and came into effect on 14 August 1925. The treaty defines Svalbard as all islands, islets and skerries from 74° to 81° north latitude, and from 10° to 35° east longitude. It secures full Norwegian sovereignty over the archipelago, but contains several restrictions: peaceful use of the islands, the non-discrimination of citizens and companies of signatory countries, the obligation to protect the natural environment and limitations in taxation. The treaty has 39 signatories.

The Svalbard Act was passed on 17 June 1925 and establishes that Svalbard is "part of the Kingdom of Norway". It further stipulates that civil law, criminal law and procedural law applies to Svalbard, but that other provisions only apply if specifically stipulated. As of 2008 there were 31 regulations which applied to Svalbard. The act also dictates the administration of Svalbard, notably establishing the governor and the Commissioner of Mines.

The Svalbard Environmental Protection Act was passed on 15 June 2001 and took effect on 1 July 2002, replacing various regulations. The act was created to secure a continuous, nearly untouched natural environment on Svalbard, particularly regarding wilderness, landscape, flora, fauna and cultural heritage. The act is enacted by the Ministry of the Environment, the Climate and Pollution Agency, the governor, the Directorate for Cultural Heritage and the Directorate for Nature Management. The act is supplemented by various regulations. Specific issues addressed in the act include the protection of plants and all remains of all human activity up to 1945. It imposes limitations on traffic in permitted areas, particularly motorized vehicles, but allows locals to operate snowscooters in more areas than tourists. Two-thirds of Svalbard is protected through national parks and nature reserves.

== Institutions ==
=== Governor ===
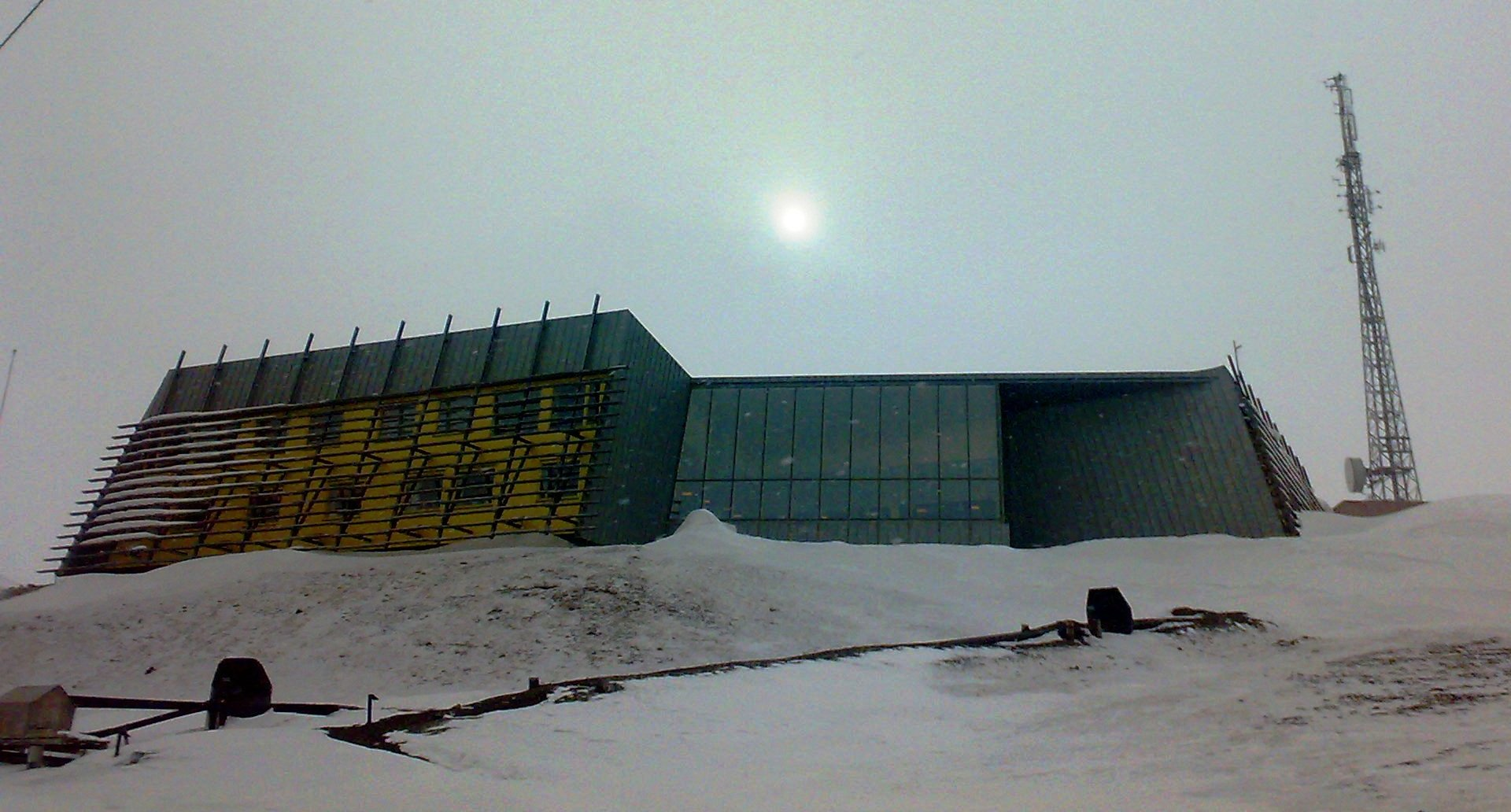
The Governor's offices

The Governor of Svalbard (Norwegian: Sysselmesteren) is the principal representative of the Government of Norway in Svalbard. The institution is located in Longyearbyen and has since 2021 been led by Governor Lars Fause. The institution's main responsibilities are implementing Norwegian policies, safeguarding Norwegian rights and obligations and representing Svalbard in relation to central authorities. Specifically, the governor acts as chief of police, holds the authority of a county governor and enacts family law. The institution has 30 employees and is subordinate to the Ministry of Justice and Public Security.

Svalbard is a police district of the Norwegian Police Service, with the governor having the responsibilities of both sheriff and chief of police. This includes security; law and order enforcement, including traffic controls; case investigation; and preventative systems. The governor is responsible for search and rescue and is head of the local rescue station and subordinate of the Joint Rescue Coordination Centre of Northern Norway in Bodø. The institution is also responsible for issuing of driver's licences, vehicle registration, passports and firearms licenses. The governor and his deputy represent the public prosecutors.

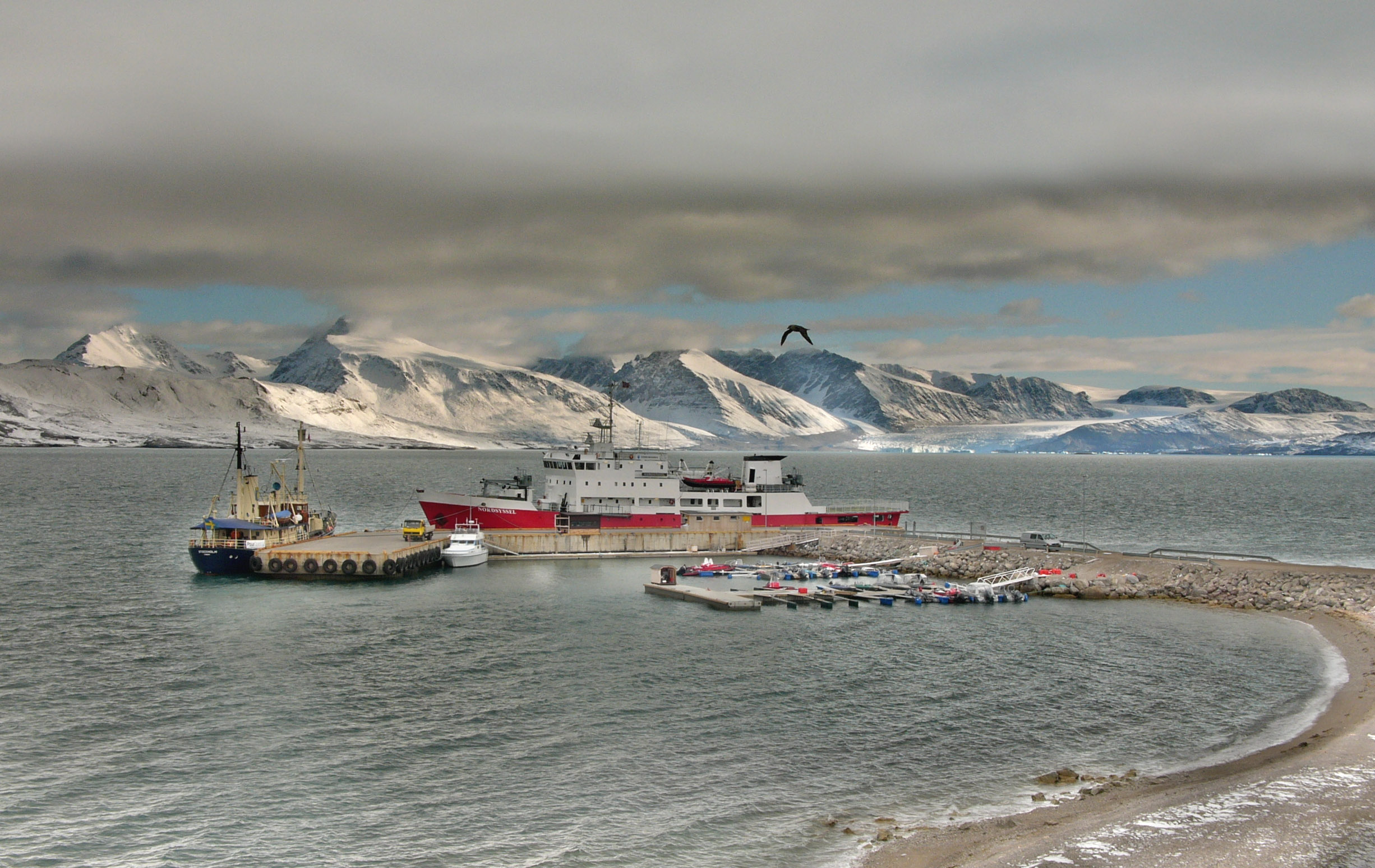
Nordsyssel at port in Ny-Ålesund

The governor is also responsible for environmental protection, including nature supervision, environmental monitoring, species management, management of cultural heritage sites, administration of tourism and travel, oil spill contingency and safeguarding of the environment. The agency maintains two helicopters, a Eurocopter AS332 Super Puma and a Eurocopter AS365 Dauphin, the inspection vessel Nordsyssel as well as lighter equipment such as snowmobiles, cars and boats. The governor's jurisdiction applies to all land and the territorial waters up to 12 nautical miles (22 km; 14 mi) from land.

=== Longyearbyen Community Council ===
Longyearbyen Community Council is the only elected local government in the archipelago and has many of the same responsibilities of a municipality. It is organized with a fifteen-member council which since 2011 has been led by Mayor Christin Kristoffersen of the Labour Party. The council's main responsibilities are infrastructure and utilities, including power, land-use and community planning, education from kindergarten to upper secondary level and child welfare. It operates three kindergartens in addition to the 13-grade Longyearbyen School. However, unlike mainland municipalities, the healthcare services are provided by the state through Longyearbyen Hospital, a clinic operated by the University Hospital of North Norway. No care or nursing services and welfare payments are available. Norwegian residents retain pension and medical rights through their mainland municipalities.

Foreign nationals residing in Svalbard were eligible to vote in local elections in the past, but this right was taken away in 2022.

=== Other ===
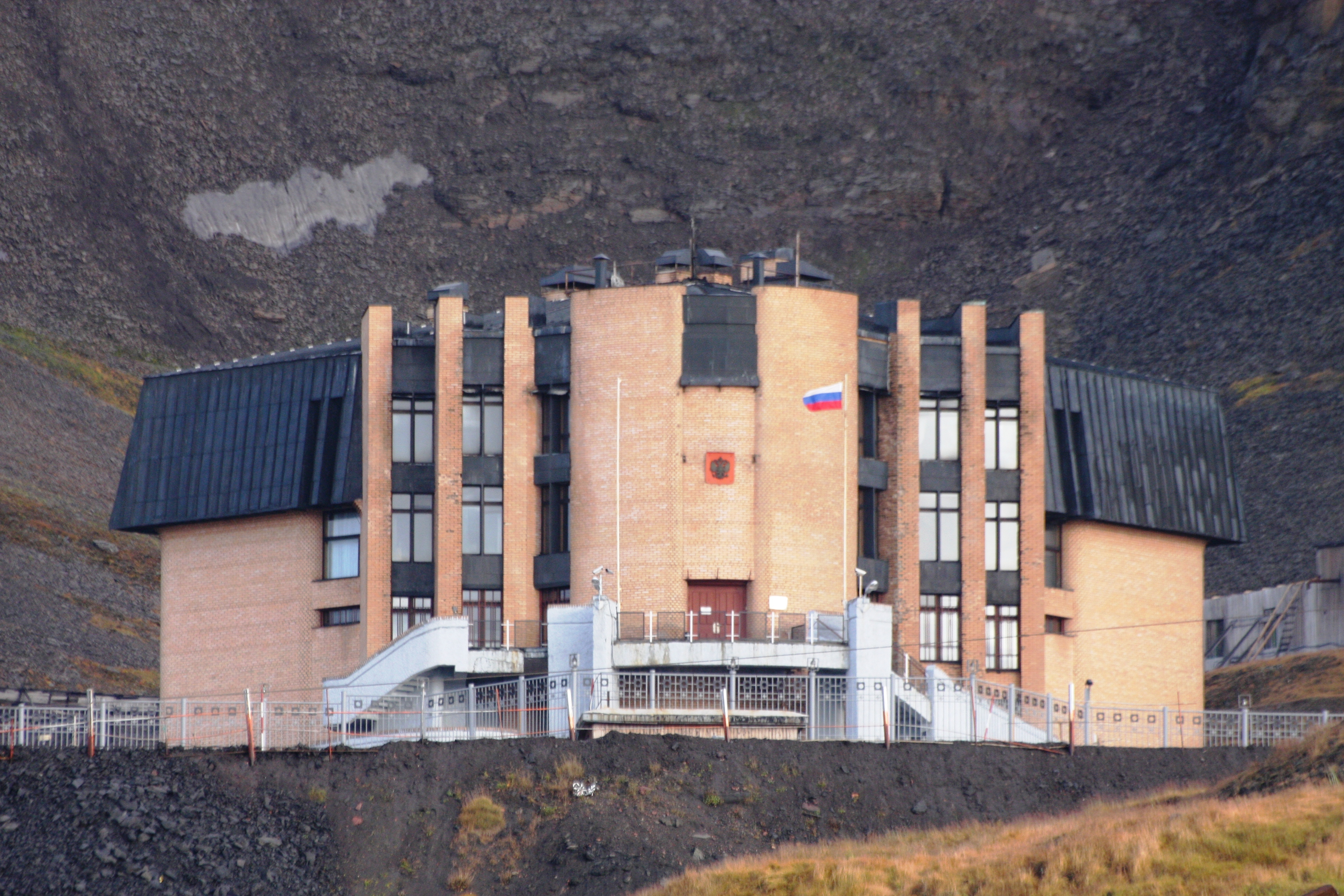
The Consulate of Russia in Barentsburg

The Commissioner of Mining for Svalbard is part of the Norwegian Directorate of Mining, but retains its own offices in Longyearbyen. The commissioner is responsible for administrating mineral rights, both for mining and petroleum. Other public agencies which have supervisory roles, but are not stationed on Svalbard, are the Norwegian Labour Inspection Authority, the Norwegian Petroleum Directorate, the Norwegian Directorate for Fire and Explosion Prevention and the Norwegian Directorate for Product and Electrical Safety.

Other public offices with presence on Longyearbyen are the Norwegian Polar Institute, the Norwegian Tax Administration and the Church of Norway. Svalbard is subordinate to Nord-Troms District Court and Hålogaland Court of Appeal, both located in Tromsø. Russia maintains a consulate in Barentsburg, led by Consule General Alexander Antipov.

== Issues ==
=== Peaceful use ===
Article 9 of the Svalbard Treaty specifies that no fortifications and naval bases may be built on Svalbard, nor can the archipelago be used for "warlike purposes". The preparatory work of the treaty and later state practice has been to enforce that no military activity is carried out on the archipelago; however, the treaty as such does not ban, for instance, the construction of air stations or military installations not regarded as defense works. There is scholarly consensus that Article 9 is unclear, but that a military presence should only be established when there is an attack or threat of attack on Svalbard. Norway can clearly not use Svalbard to make a threat of war, but retains the right to self-defense against an attack on Svalbard. However, the right does not allow Norway to bring Svalbard into war as part of self-defense of other parts of the country.

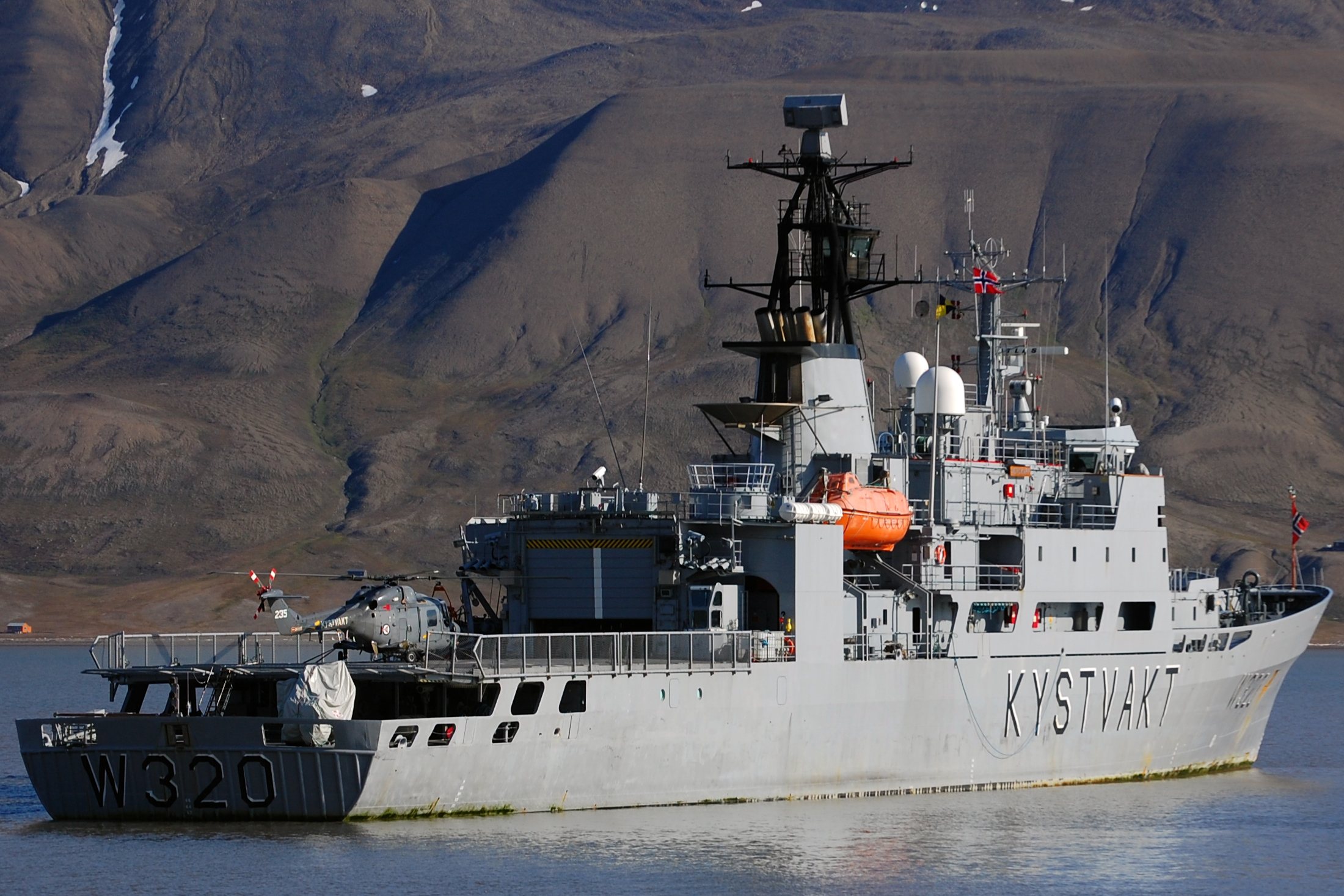
KV Nordkapp patrolling in Adventfjorden

The waters around Svalbard are of strategic significance for Russia as the Northern Fleet must pass through the area to reach the Atlantic Ocean. The concern of the Soviet Union and Russia was therefore to ensure that listening stations and anti-submarine warfare installations were not placed on the archipelago. Except during the Second World War, Norway has never stationed any military troops on Svalbard. However, the Norwegian Coast Guard carries out surveillance. There were many protests during the Cold War from the Soviet Union against Norwegian activity on the island, including purely civil arrangements. The Soviet Union issued many memorandums protesting such installations as satellite ground stations and airports, and even the filming of Orion's Belt, on the grounds that it could be a cover for or had the potential for being used for military activities.

=== Sovereignty ===
Norway was prior to 1920 extremely active in gaining international support for Norwegian sovereignty, but following the treaty, Norwegian interest in the archipelago dwindled. From the start of the Cold War, Norwegian politicians wanted to avoid bringing the islands into superpower politics. This resulted in a policy of avoiding agitating the Soviet Union, which again resulted in the Norwegian authorities actively working against both Norwegian and foreign activities on Svalbard which could raise tensions. Compared to mainland relations, which were dominated by deterring through NATO membership, the Norwegian policy on Svalbard was related to calming the Soviet Union. Similarly, while a foreign presence was encouraged on the mainland, it was strongly discouraged on Svalbard.

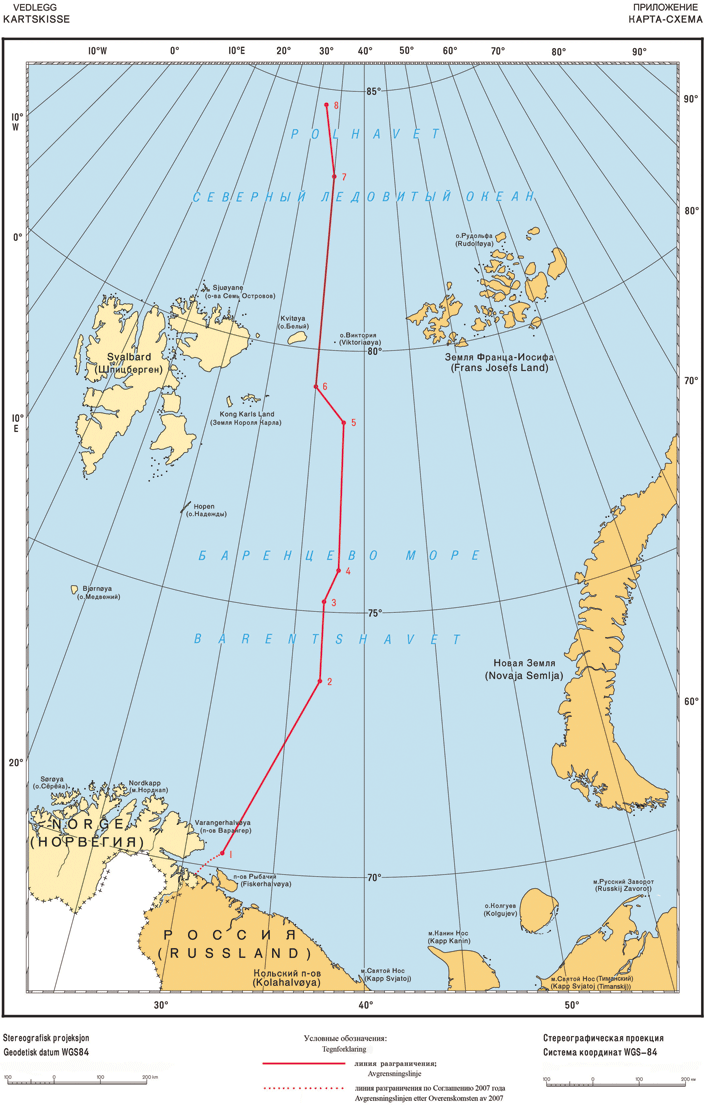
Map of the delimitation border

Nearly all Norwegian activity during the Cold War resulted in a protest from the Soviet Union, which claimed, with basis in the treaty, that the archipelago was a demilitarized zone. The Soviet Union would protest against any foreign and most new Norwegian activity on the grounds that it violated Article 9, even if it was not remotely related to military activity. The fear of such a reaction led Norway to disallow practically all foreign and innovative use of the archipelago. Norway essentially had a "non-policy" managing Svalbard with a defensive and inconsequential reaction every time activity was proposed.

Norway established a fisheries protection area surrounding Svalbard on 15 June 1977, which strictly regulates fisheries, but on a non-discriminatory basis. The zone extends 200 nautical miles (370 km; 230 mi) beyond the territorial waters. Norway maintains that the treaty's non-discrimination-policy only applies to land and the territorial waters and that Norway is free to establish an economic zone beyond that. Fishing vessels from Norway, Iceland, the Faeroe Islands, Russian and the European Union are awarded quotas for cod and herring; these and Greenland and Canada have been issued quotas for shrimp. Norway and the Soviet Union, later Russia, disagreed regarding the border between the two counties' exclusive economic zones in the Barents Sea. Norway claimed the internationally recognized equidistance principle should apply, while Russia claimed that the unilateral meridian line be used. The issue was resolved with a compromise in 2010.

=== Non-discrimination ===
The treaty ensures that all citizens and companies from signatory countries receive equal rights of access and residence. Norway may not discriminate—based on nationality—the rights to fish, hunt and conduct mining, trade, industry and maritime activity. However, these activities may be limited by non-discriminatory legislation. Thus Norway is permitted to place regulations and prohibitions on basis of other objective criteria, or ban certain activities altogether or in certain geographic areas. The non-discrimination clause also does not ban nationality discrimination elsewhere than in economic activity. Specifically, research and scientific activities do not fall under the non-discrimination clause.

A central part of the non-discrimination policy is the Mining Code of 7 August 1925. It is uncertain if the code is internationally binding, or if it can be amended unilaterally by Norway. Specifically, the commissioner issues licenses to search for minerals and state-owned and other owner's land and to register claims. To maintain a claim, the owner must work 1,500-man-hours per five years and pay an annual fee of 6,000 Norwegian krone. However, the Ministry of Trade and Industry may grant exceptions from the work obligation under specific conditions.

The treaty only allows taxation to the extent that it covers the cost of administrating the archipelago and covering the services provided to the residents. The tax rate is therefore significantly lower than in Metropolitan Norway, including the absence of value added tax. The government summarizes its expenses on Svalbard in the Svalbard Budget. The taxation rules made Svalbard a tax paradise, and in 2009 the oil rig operator Seadrill established a subsidiary in Longyearbyen to exploit the lower taxes. In 2011, the tax rate for profits exceeding NOK 10 million were raised from 16 to 28 percent—the same as on the mainland.
