= Bent Åserud =

Norwegian musician and film score composer

Bent Åserud (born 5 April 1950) is a Norwegian musician and film score composer.

Åserud co-founded the group Juniper Greene in 1966, where he was a vocalist and played the guitar. The band started playing blues but later changed to progressive rock. It signed its first record contract in 1971. He graduated from the Norwegian Academy of Music in Oslo in 1977.

Along with Geir Bøhren, Åserud had his breakthrough as a film score composer for Orion's Belt with the theme Svalbardtema, which has become an unofficial anthem for Svalbard. With this score, they won the Amanda Award for best score and the Film Critics' Award. The duo continued to work closely with director Ola Solum, for which they made the score for nearly all his later works. Åserud created, along with Bøhren, the official anthem for the 1994 Winter Olympics. He has won the 1999 Spellemannsprisen for the record Jul i Blåfjell.

== Bibliography ==
- Skagen, Sølvi (2005). Fra idé til film: Orions belte (in Norwegian). Vett & Viten. ISBN 978-82-412-0540-8.
