= Orion's Belt (novel) =

1977 novel by Jon Michelet

- First edition (Norwegian)
- Author: Jon Michelet
- Original title: Orions belte
- Language: Norwegian
- Genre: Action-thriller
- Set in: Svalbard
- Publisher: Oktober Forlag
- Publication date: 1977
- Publication place: Norway

Orion's Belt (Norwegian: Orions belte) is an action-thriller novel written by Norwegian author Jon Michelet. It was published by Oktober Forlag in 1977 and became a popular seller. It was translated into English by Ellen Nations. The novel was adapted into a 1985 film by the same name, which is regarded as Norway's first modern action film.

The novel follows three shabby Svalbard-based seamen who discover a Soviet bearing station. They are subsequently both targets of Soviet liquidation and American interrogation in an attempt quiet them and retain the political status quo. The Cold War topics were a critique of the Norwegian policy of allowing a Soviet presence on Svalbard.

The book received mixed reviews. It was appreciated by Dagbladet, but criticized by Aftenposten. The book's popularity came in part from the public interest in what 3,000 Russians were doing living on the Norwegian archipelago. The title is a reference to that Svalbard was as central located in a potential Cold War war theater as Orion's Belt. The novel also played on the fear of nuclear war and the lack of information from Norwegian media about the issue.
