= Sarstangen =

Peninsula in Svalbard, Norway

Coordinates: 78°43.5′N 11°26.′E

Sarstangen is a point on the island of Prins Karls Forland in Svalbard, Norway. It is located east of Forlandsrevet and north of Sarsbukta. It is named after Michael Sars.
