= List of Amanda Award winners =

The following is a list of Amanda Award winners within the main categories awarded at the annual Norwegian International Film Festival since the award's initiation in 1985. In 1993, the so-called "Nordic Amanda" honoured cinematic achievements from all the Nordic countries. This practice was discontinued the following year, but an award for best Nordic film was awarded until the year 2000.

In 2025, the honorary Amanda was awarded to director Hans Petter Moland and the Golden Clapper to the composer duo Geir Bøhren and Bent Åserud.

== Categories ==
The list of categories is incomplete.

=== Best Film (Norwegian) ===
1985–2004 the Amanda Award for Best Norwegian Film was given to the director. In 2005 this practice was changed, and the award is now given to the film's producer.

Year	Film	Director/Producer
1985
1985	Orions belte	Ola Solum
1985	Galskap!	Egil Kolstø
1985	The Chieftain	Terje Kristiansen
1986
1986	Wives – Ten Years After	Anja Breien
1986	Blackout	Erik Gustavson
1986	Havlandet	Lasse Glomm
1987
1987	X	Oddvar Einarson
1987	Hard Asphalt	Sølve Skagen
1987	The Feldmann Case	Bente Erichsen
1988
1988	Veiviseren	Nils Gaup
1988	The Ice Palace	Per Blom
1988	Etter Rubicon	Leidulv Risan
1989
1989	For harde livet	Sigve Endresen
1990
1990	En håndfull tid	Martin Asphaug
1991
1991	Herman	Erik Gustavson
1992
1992	Frida – med hjertet i hånden	Berit Nesheim
1994
1994	Hodet over vannet	Nils Gaup
1995
1995	Eggs	Bent Hamer
1996
1996	Kjærlighetens kjøtere	Hans Petter Moland
1997
1997	Budbringeren	Pål Sletaune
1998
1998	Salige er de som tørster	Carl Jørgen Kiønig
1999
1999	Bare skyer beveger stjernene	Torun Lian
2000
2000	SOS	Thomas Robsahm
2000	Misery Harbour	Nils Gaup
2000	Når mørket er forbi	Knut Erik Jensen
2001
2001	Heftig og begeistret	Knut Erik Jensen
2001	Aberdeen	Hans Petter Moland
2001	Detektor	Pål Jackman
2002
2002	Alt om min far	Even Benestad
2002	Jeg er Dina	Ole Bornedal
2002	Tyven, tyven	Trygve Allister Diesen
2003
2003	Salmer fra kjøkkenet	Bent Hamer
2003	Jonny Vang	Jens Lien
2003	Villmark	Pål Øie
2004
2004	Buddy	Morten Tyldum
2004	The Beautiful Country	Hans Petter Moland
2004	Bázo	Lars-Göran Pettersson
2005
2005	Hawaii, Oslo	Finn Gjerdrum, Torleif Hauge, Erik Poppe
2005	Colour of Milk	Catho Bach Christensen
2005	Ungdommens råskap	Margareth Olin
2005	Uno	Jørgen Storm Rosenberg
2005	Venner for Livet	Ellen Jacobsen
2006
2006	Free Jimmy	Lars Andreas Hellebust
2006	The Bothersome Man	Jørgen Storm Rosenberg
2006	The Giant	Torleif Hauge, Finn Gjerdrum
2006	Izzat	John M. Jacobsen, Sveinung Golimo
2006	Pitbullterje	Finn Gjerdrum, Torleif Hauge, Stein B. Kvae
2007
2007	Reprise	Karin Julsrud
2007	Mirush	Gudny Hummelvoll
2007	Sons	Eric Vogel
2008
2008	The Man Who Loved Yngve	Yngve Sæther
2008	O' Horten	Bent Hamer
2008	Gone with the Woman	Olav Øen
2009
2009	Max Manus	John M. Jacobsen, Sveinung Golimo
2009	Jernanger	Maria Ekerhovd, Torleif Hauge
2009	North	Sigve Endresen, Brede Hovland
2010
2010	Upperdog	Asle Vatn, Christian Fredrik Martin
2010	A Somewhat Gentle Man	Finn Gjerdrum, Stein B. Kvae
2010	Vegas	Tanya Badendyck, Silje Hopland Eik, Maria Ekerhovd
2011
2011	King of Devil's Island	Karin Julsrud
2011	Tears of Gaza	Terje Kristiansen, Vibeke Løkkeberg
2011	Nokas	Jan Aksel Angeltvedt
2012
2012	Turn Me On, Dammit!	Sigve Endresen, Brede Hovland, Jannicke Systad Jacobsen
2012	The Orheim Company	Yngve Sæther, Sigve Endresen
2012	Pushwagner	Carsten Aanonsen
2012	The Monitor	Turid Øversveen
2013
2013	I Belong	Yngve Sæther
2013	It's Only Make Believe	Gary Cranner
2013	Before Snowfall	Finn Gjerdrum, Stein B. Kvae
2013	Kon-Tiki	Aage Aaberge, Jeremy Thomas
2014
2014	A Thousand Times Good Night	Finn Gjerdrum, Stein B. Kvae
2014	Blind	Hans-Jørgen Osnes, Sigve Endresen
2014	Louis & Luca and the Snow Machine	Cornelia Boysen
2015
2015	Børning	John M. Jacobsen, Sveinung Golimo, Marcus B. Brodersen, Hallvard Bræin
2015	1001 Grams	Bent Hamer
2015	Out of Nature	Ole Giæver, Maria Ekerhovd
2016
2016	The Wave	Martin Sundland, Are Heidenstrøm, Roar Uthaug
2016	Louder Than Bombs	Thomas Robsahm, Alexandre Mallet-Guy, Joshua Astrachan, Marc Turtletaub, Albert Berger, Ron Yerxa
2016	Doing Good	Margreth Olin
2017
2017	The King's Choice	Finn Gjerdrum, Stein B. Kvae
2017	Børning 2	Marcus B. Brodersen, John M. Jacobsen
2017	In the Forest of Huckybucky	Ove Heiborg, Elisabeth Opdal, Eirik Smidesang Slåen
2018
2018	What Will People Say	Maria Ekerhovd
2018	Thelma	Joachim Trier, Thomas Robsahm
2018	U – 22 July	Finn Gjerdrum, Stein B. Kvae
2019
2019	Out Stealing Horses	Turid Øversveen, Håkon Øverås
2019	The Quake	Martin Sundland
2019	Harajuku	Cornelia Boysen, Synnøve Hørsdal
2020
2020	Beware of Children	Yngve Sæther
2020	Hope	Thomas Robsahm
2020	Selvportrett	Margreth Olin
2021
2021	The Painter and the Thief	Ingvil Giske
2021	Generasjon Utøya	Aslaug Holm, Sigve Endresen
2021	Ninjababy	Yngve Sæther
2022
2022	The Worst Person in the World	Andrea Berentsen Ottmar, Thomas Robsahm
2022	The Innocents	Maria Ekerhovd
2022	Nordsjøen	Martin Sundland, Catrin Gundersen, Therese Bøhn
2023
2023	Ellos eatnu – La elva leve	Ole Giæver, Maria Ekerhovd
2023	Sick of Myself	Kristoffer Borgli, Andrea Berentsen Ottmar, Dyveke Bjørkly Graver
2023	Den siste våren	Franciska Seifert Eliassen
2024
2024	The Remarkable Life of Ibelin	Benjamin Ree/ Benjamin Ree
2024	Convoy	Henrik Martin Dahlsbakken/ Martin Sundland, Catrin Gundersen and Thea Benedikte Kevin Karlsen
2024	Sex	Dag Johan Haugerud/ Hege Hauff Hvattum and Yngve Sæther
2025
2025	Loveable	Lilja Ingolfsdottir/ Thomas Robsahm
2025	Armand	Halfdan Ullmann Tøndel/ Andrea Berentsen Ottmar and Dyveke Bjørkly Graver
2025	Dreams (Sex Love)	Dag Johan Haugerud/ Hege Hauff Hvattum and Yngve Sæther
2026
2026	Sentimental Value	Joachim Trier / Maria Ekerhovd, Andrea Berentsen
2026	A Mouse Hunt for Christmas	Henrik Martin Dahlsbakken / Martin Sundland, Thea B. Kevin Karlsen and Tor Markus
2026	Trango	Christopher Carvasal/ Filip Christensen and Christopher Carvasal

=== Best Director ===
The award for best director has only been awarded since 2005. Before this the best film award, which is now given to the producer, was given to the director.

Year	Film	Director
2005	Uno	Aksel Hennie
2006	Den brysomme mannen	Jens Lien
2007	Reprise	Joachim Trier
2008	Mannen som elsket Yngve	Stian Kristiansen (film director)
2009	Fatso	Arild Fröhlich
2010	Upperdog	Sara Johnsen
2011	Nokas	Erik Skjoldbjærg
2012	Oslo, 31. august	Joachim Trier
2013	Som du ser meg	Dag Johan Haugerud
2014	Blind	Eskil Vogt
2015	To brødre	Aslaug Holm
2016	Louder Than Bombs	Joachim Trier
2017	Hunting Flies	Izer Aliu
2018	Hva vil folk si	Iram Haq
2019	Out Stealing Horses	Hans Petter Moland
2020	Beware of Children	Dag Johan Haugerud
2021	Ninjababy	Yngvild Sve Flikke
2022	The Innocents	Eskil Vogt
2023	Let the River Flow	Ole Giæver
2024	Sex	Dag Johan Haugerud
2025	Loveable	Lilja Ingolfsdottir
2026	Sentimental Value	Joachim Trier

=== People's Amanda ===
Year	Film	Director
2007	Fritt Vilt	Roar Uthaug
2008	Kautokeino-opprøret	Nils Gaup
2009	Max Manus	Joachim Rønning, Espen Sandberg
2010	Engelen	Margreth Olin
2011	Trolljegeren	André Øvredal
2012	Hodejegerne	Morten Tyldum
2013	Kon-Tiki	Joachim Rønning, Espen Sandberg
2014	Gåten Ragnarok	Mikkel B. Sandemose
2015	Børning	Hallvard Bræin
2016	El Clásico	Halkawt Mustafa
2017	Sammen om drømmen	Daniel Fahre
2018	Den 12. mann	Harald Zwart
2019	Skjelvet	John Andreas Andersen
2020	Kaptein Sabeltann og den magiske diamant	Rasmus A. Sivertsen, Marit Moum Aune
2021	Generasjon Utøya	Aslaug Holm, Sigve Endresen
2022	Verdens verste menneske	Joachim Trier
2023	Kampen om Narvik	Erik Skjoldbjærg
2024	Sulis 1907	Nils Gaup
2025	Nr. 24	John Andreas Andersen
2026	The Battle of Oslo	Daniel Fahre

=== Best Actor ===
Year	Actor	Film
1985	Helge Jordal	Orions belte
1986	Nils Ole Oftebro	Du kan da ikke bare gå
1987	Bjørn Sundquist	Over grensen
1988	Erik Hivju	Tartuffe
1989	Reidar Sørensen	Himmelplaneten
1990	Sverre Anker Ousdal	Kreditorene
1991	Per Sunderland	Dødsdansen
1992	Wilfred Breistrand	Thomas F's siste nedtegnelse til allmenheten
1993	Hannu Kivioja	Tuhlaajapoika, Finland
1994	Espen Skjønberg	Secondløitnanten
1995	Sverre Hansen and Kjell Stormoen	Eggs
1996	Bjørn Sundquist	Søndagsengler
1997	Robert Skjærstad	Budbringeren
1998	Sverre Anker Ousdal	Blodsbånd
1999	Ingar Helge Gimle	Absolute Hangover
2000	Bjørn Sundquist	Sejer – se deg ikke tilbake
2001	Svein Scharffenberg	Når nettene blir lange
2002	Robert Stoltenberg	Borettslaget
2003	Aksel Hennie	Jonny Vang
2004	Anders Baasmo Christiansen	Buddy
2005	Kristoffer Joner	Naboer
2006	Trond Fausa Aurvaag	Den brysomme mannen
2007	Raouf Saraj	Vinterland
2008	Trond Espen Seim	Fallen Angels
2009	Aksel Hennie	Max Manus
2010	Stellan Skarsgård	En ganske snill mann
2011	Henrik Rafaelsen	Sykt lykkelig
2012	Kristoffer Joner	Kompani Orheim
2013	Pål Sverre Hagen	Kon-Tiki
2014	Aksel Hennie	Pioner
2015	Bjørn Sundquist	Her er Harold
2016	Anders Baasmo Christiansen	Welcome to Norway
2017	Kristoffer Joner	Hjertestart
2018	Adil Hussain	Hva vil folk si
2019	Tobias Santelmann	Mordene i Kongo
2020	Jan Gunnar Røise	Barn
2021	Jakob Oftebro	Den største forbrytelsen
2022	Pål Sverre Hagen	The Middle Man
2023	Pål Sverre Hagen	Krigsseileren
2024	Jan Gunnar Røise	Sex
2025	Helga Guren	Loveable

=== Best Actress ===
Year	Actress	Film
1985	Tone Danielsen	Det gode mennesket i Sezuan
1986	Anne Marie Ottersen	Hustruer – ti år etter
1987	Marianne Krogh	Fri
1988	Anne Krigsvoll	Av måneskinn gror det ingenting
1989	Amanda Ooms	Karachi
1990	Camilla Strøm Henriksen	En håndfull tid
1991	Lise Fjeldstad	Dødsdansen
1992	Anneke von der Lippe	Krigerens hjerte
1993	Marie Richardson	Telegrafisten
1994	Harriet Anderson	Høyere enn himmelen
1995	Anneke von der Lippe	Over stork og stein and Pan
1996	Rut Tellefsen	Kristin Lavransdatter
1997	Eli Anne Linnestad	Budbringeren
1998	Kjersti Elvik	Salige er de som tørster/Blind gudinne
1999	Brit Elisabeth Haagensli	Absolute Hangover
2000	Kjersti Holmen	SOS and Sofies verden
2001	Hildegun Riise	Detektor
2002	Maria Bonnevie	Jeg er Dina
2003	Lena Endre	Musikk for bryllup og begravelser
2004	Ane Dahl Torp	Svarte penger – hvite løgner
2005	Annika Hallin	Vinterkyss
2006	Ane Dahl Torp	Gymnaslærer Pedersen
2007	Ingrid Bolsø Berdal	Fritt Vilt
2008	Anni-Kristiina Juuso	Kautokeino-opprøret
2009	Ellen Dorrit Petersen	Iskyss
2010	Agnieszka Grochowska	Upperdog
2011	Line Verndal	Limbo
2012	Noomi Rapace	Babycall
2013	Laila Goody	Som du ser meg
2014	Ellen Dorrit Petersen	Blind
2015	Ine Marie Wilmann	De nærmeste
2016	Liv Bernhoft Osa	Pyromanen
2017	Ruby Dagnall	Rosemari
2018	Andrea Berntzen	Utøya 22. juli
2019	Pia Tjelta	Blindsone
2020	Andrea Bræin Hovig	Håp
2021	Kristine Kujath Thorp	Ninjababy
2022	Renate Reinsve	Verdens verste menneske
2023	Ruby Dagnall	Den siste våren

=== Best Actor (Male or female) ===
Year	Actress	Film
2024	Jan Gunnar Røise	Sex
2025	Helga Guren	Lovable

=== Best Supporting Role ===
Given intermittently up until 2007, starting in 2008 this award is given out in both a male and female category, then went back to a single category for both males and females in 2024.

Year	Actor/Actress	Film
1993	Kjersti Holmen	Telegrafisten, Norway
1998	Nils Ole Oftebro	Thranes metode
2006	Talat Hussain	Import Eksport
2007	Henrik Mestad	Sønner
2024	Siri Forberg	Sex
2025	Ellen Dorrit Petersen	Armand

=== Best Actor in a Supporting Role ===
Year	Actor	Film
2008	Espen Skjønberg	O' Horten
2009	Mads Sjøgård Pettersen	Nord
2010	Ingar Helge Gimle	En helt vanlig dag på jobben
2011	Trond Nilssen	Kongen av Bastøy
2012	Jon Øigarden	Varg Veum – I mørket er alle ulver grå
2013	Fridtjov Såheim	Victoria
2014	Herbert Nordrum	Pornopung
2015	Henrik Mestad	Børning
2016	Oliver Mukata	Welcome to Norway
2017	Karl Markovics	Kongens nei
2018	Ingar Helge Gimle	Rett vest
2019	Bjørn Floberg	Ut og stjæle hester
2020	Thorbjørn Harr	Barn
2021	Nader Khademi	Ninjababy
2022	Anders Danielsen Lie	Verdens verste menneske
2023	Gard Emil Elvenes	Ellos eatnu – La elva leve

=== Best Actress in a Supporting Role ===
Year	Actress	Film
2008	Ane Dahl Torp	Lønsj
2009	Agnes Kittelsen	Max Manus
2010	Gunilla Röör	Engelen
2011	Lena Endre	Limbo
2012	Cecilie Mosli	Kompani Orheim
2013	Suzan Ilir	Før snøen faller
2014	Ivan Anderson	Brev til Kongen
2015	Anne Krigsvoll	Kvinner i for store herreskjorter
2016	Maria Bock	Hevn
2017	Sarah Francesca Brænne	The Rules for Everything
2018	Solveig Koløen Birkeland	Utøya 22. juli
2019	Maria Bonnevie	Føniks
2020	Ingvild Holthe Bygdnes	The Tunnel
2021	Pia Halvorsen	Betrayed
2022	Sarah Khorami	Ingenting å le av
2023	Ine Marie Wilmann	War Sailor

=== Best Sound Design ===
Year	Actress	Film
2008	Petter Fladeby	O'Horten
2009	Baard Haugan Ingebretsen and Tormod Ringnes	Max Manus
2010	Tormod Ringnes	Ploddy the Police Car Makes a Splash
2011	Niels Sejer	Limbo
2012	Tormod Ringnes, Christian Schaanning	Babycall
2013	Christian Schaanning	Uskyld
2014	Gisle Tveito	Blind
2015	Fredric Vogel, Petter Fladeby	Børning
2016	Christian Schaanning	Bølgen
2017	Christian Schaanning	Kongens nei
2018	Christian Schaanning	Den 12. mann
2019	Gunn Tove Grønsberg	Harajuku
2020	Gisle Tveito	Beware of Children
2021	Alexander Dudarev	Gunda
2022	Gisle Tveito and Gustaf Berger	The Innocents
2023	Espen Rønning and Bent Holm	Narvik
2024	Bent Holm and Andreas Franck	Handling the Undead
2025	Mats Lid Støten	Armand

=== Best Children's Film ===
Year	Film	Director
1985	Lars i porten	Leif Erlsboe
1986	Herfra til Tøyen	Kjersti Paulsen
1988	Nattseilere	Tor M. Tørstad
1989	Frida – med hjertet i hånden	Berit Nesheim
1990	Steinen	Øivind S. Jorfald
1991	Døden på Oslo S	Eva Isaksen
2002	Tiden før Tim	Anne Marie Nørholm
2003	Ulvesommer	Peder Norlund
2004	Bare Bea	Petter Næss
2005	Venner for Livet	Arne Lindtner Næss
2006	Pitbullterje	Arild Frölich
2007	Jenter	Hanne Myren
2008	Mannen som elsket Yngve	Stian Kristiansen (film director)
2009	I et speil, i en gåte	Jesper W. Nielsen
2010	Knerten	Åsleik Engmark
2011	Elias og jakten på havets gull	Lise I. Osvoll
2012	Til siste hinder	Anders Øvergaard
2013	Pelle Politibil på sporet	Aage Aaberge, Live Bonnevie
2014	Solan og Ludvig – Jul i Flåklypa	Rasmus A. Sivertsen
2015	Operasjon Arktis	Grethe Bøe-Waal
2016	Knutsen & Ludvigsen og den fæle Rasputin	Eric Vogel
2017	Dyrene i Hakkebakkeskogen	Rasmus A. Sivertsen
2018	Elias og Storegaps hemmelighet	Simen Alsvik, Will Ashurst
2019	Psychobitch	Martin Lund
2020	Flukten over grensen	Johanne Helgeland
2021	Tottori! Sommeren vi var alene	Silje Salomonsen and Arild Østin Ommundsen
2022	Tre nøtter til Askepott	Cecilie Mosli
2023	Dancing Queen	Aurora Gossé
2024	Hør her’a!	Kaveh Tehrani
2025	Kvitebjørn - Østenfor sol og vestenfor måne	Mikkel Sandemose

=== Best Original Screenplay ===
Year	Writer(s)	Film
1993	Erik Clausen, Søren Skjær; Sanni Sylvester, John Nehm	De frigjorte, Denmark
2004	Elsa Kvamme	Fia og klovnene
2005	Harald Rosenløw Eeg	Hawaii, Oslo
2006	Per Schreiner	Den brysomme mannen
2007	Eskil Vogt and Joachim Trier	Reprise
2008	Thomas Moldestad and Siv Rajendram Eliassen	Fallen Angels
2009	Thomas Nordseth-Tiller	Max Manus
2010	Gunnar Vikene, Torun Lian	Vegas
2011	Christopher Grøndahl	Nokas
2012	Pål Sletaune	Babycall
2013	Dag Johan Haugerud	Som du ser meg
2014	Hisham Zaman, Mehmet Aktaş	Brev til Kongen
2015	Bent Hamer	1001 gram
2016	Eskil Vogt, Joachim Trier	Louder Than Bombs
2017	Harald Rosenløw Eeg, Jan Trygve Røyneland	Kongens nei
2018	Iram Haq	Hva vil folk si
2019	Martin Lund	Psychobitch
2020	Dag Johan Haugerud	Beware of Children
2021	Johan Fasting, Yngvild Sve Flikke, Inga Sætre	Ninjababy
2022	Eskil Vogt and Joachim Trier	The Worst Person in the World
2023	Kristoffer Borgli	Sick of Myself
2024	Dag Johan Haugerud	Sex
2025	Lilja Ingolfsdottir	Loveable

=== Best Short film ===
Year	Film	Director
1985	Rendezvous	Erik Gustavson
1987	Aske, skodde, støv for vinden	Jannike M. Falk idea and choreography: Kjersti Alveberg
1989	Den nye kappelanen	Emil Stang Lund
1990	Åndedrag	Maria Fuglevaag Warsinski
1991	Året gjennom Børfjord	Morten Skallerud
1994	Applaus	Bent Hamer
1995	Dypets ensomhet	Joachim Solum/Thomas Lien
1996	Eremittkrepsen	Tove Cecilie Sverdrup
1997	En mann	Eva F. Dahr
1998	One Day a Man Bought a House (Huset på Kampen)	Pjotr Sapegin
1999	Tann for tann	Emil Stang Lund
2000	Uanmeldt hopper	John Alfheim og Martin Slaatto
2001	Første akt	Alexander Eik
2002	Aria	Pjotr Sapegin
2003	Alt i alt	Torbjørn Skårild
2004	En søndag i Schweigaardsgate	Charlotte Blom
2005	Bawke	Hisham Zaman
2006	Alene menn sammen	Trond Fausa Aurvaag
2007	Janus	Linda Fagerli Sæthren
2008	Varde	Hanne Larsen
2009	Darek	Jonas Matzow Gulbrandsen
2010	Samaritanen	Magnus Mork
2011	1994	Kaveh Tehrani
2012	Å vokte fjellet ("To Guard a Mountain")	Izer Aliu
2013	Magnus – en vårdag	Magnus Lilleberg
2014	Amasone	Marianne Ulrichsen
2015	Bunker	Vibeke Heide
2016	Frysninger	Marius Myrmel
2017	Min søster	Liv Joelle Barbosa Blad
2018	No Man is an Island	Ali Parandian

=== Best Documentary ===
Year	Film	Director
1986	Finnmark mellom øst og vest	Knut Erik Jensen
1987	Lenger inne, der ingen andre går	Hans E. Voktor
1988	Olje	Bjørn Nilsen and Ted Brocklebank
1989	For harde livet	Sigve Endresen
1990	Metropolis-programmene	Morten Thomte
1991	Svett glamour	Alexander Røsler
1993	Tanjuska och de sju djävlorna	Pirjo Honkasalo, Finland
1995	Mørketid – kvinners møte med nazismen	Karoline Frogner
1997	Liv Ullmann – scener fra et liv	Edvard Hambro
1998	Leve blant løver	Sigve Endresen
1999	Dei mjuke hendene	Margreth Olin
2000	Noen spørsmål om boksing	Beate Grimsrud and Stefan Wrenfelt
2001	Heftig og begeistret	Knut Erik Jensen
2002	Kroppen min	Margreth Olin
2003	Et steinkast unna	Line Halvorsen
2004	Home of the Brave, Land of the Free	John Sullivan and Gard Andreassen
2005	Evig din	Monica Csango
2007	Jenter	Hanne Myren
2008	Blod & ære	Håvard Bustnes
2009	Moderne slaveri	Thomas Robsahm, Tina Davis
2010	Brødre i krig	Øystein Rakkenes
2011	Reunion – ti år etter krigen	Jon Haukeland
2012	Folk ved fjorden	Øyvind Sandberg
2013	De andre	Margreth Olin
2014	Light Fly, Fly High	Susann Østigaard, Beathe Hofseth
2015	Drone	Tonje Hessen Schei
2016	Dugma – The Button	Ingvil Giske
2017	Nowhere to Hide	Zaradasht Ahmed
2018	Røverdatter	Sofia Haugan
2019	Hvor man vender tilbake	Egil Håskjold Larsen
2020	Selvportrett	Margareth Olin
2021	Kunstneren og tjyven	Benjamin Ree
2022	Nattebarn	Peter Aaberg, Sverre Kvamme
2023	Brødrene Johansen	Trude Berge Ottersen
2024	Ukjent landskap	Silje Evensmo Jacobsen
2025	Stoltenberg: Facing War	Tommy Gulliksen

=== Best Film (International) ===
Year	Film	Director
1985	Amadeus	Miloš Forman
1986	Ran	Akira Kurosawa
1987	Down by Law	Jim Jarmusch
1988	Dirty Dancing	Emile Ardolino
1989	Bagdad Café	Percy Adlon
1990	Distant Voices, Still Lives	Terence Davies
1991	Ju Dou	Zhang Yimou
1992	Il Capitano	Jan Troell
1993	The Crying Game	Neil Jordan
1994	Schindler's List	Steven Spielberg
1995	Forrest Gump	Robert Zemeckis
1996	Il Postino	Michael Radford
1997	Independence Day	Roland Emmerich
1998	Titanic	James Cameron
1999	Fucking Åmål	Lukas Moodysson
2000	American Beauty	Sam Mendes
2001	Billy Elliot	Stephen Daldry
2002	Amélie	Jean-Pierre Jeunet
2003	The Hours	Stephen Daldry
2004	The Lord of the Rings: The Return of the King	Peter Jackson
2005	Der Untergang	Oliver Hirschbiegel
2006	Walk the Line	James Mangold
2007	The Departed	Martin Scorsese
2008	There Will Be Blood	Paul Thomas Anderson
2009	Slumdog Millionaire	Danny Boyle
2010	The White Ribbon	Michael Haneke
2011	Another Year	Mike Leigh
2012	Drive	Nicolas Winding Refn
2013	Searching for Sugar Man	Malik Bendjelloul
2014	The Great Beauty	Paolo Sorrentino
2015	Leviathan	Andrey Zvyagintsev
2016	Virgin Mountain	Dagur Kári
2017	Manchester by the Sea	Kenneth Lonergan
2018	Three Billboards Outside Ebbing, Missouri	Martin McDonagh
2019	Capernaum	Nadine Labaki
2020	Joker	Todd Phillips
2021	Another Round	Thomas Vinterberg
2022	Everything Everywhere All At Once	The Daniels
2023	Close	Lukas Dhont
2024	Poor Things	Yorgos Lanthimos
2025	The Brutalist	Brady Corbet

=== The Amanda Committee's Golden Clapper (technical award) ===
Year	Recipient
1990	Eli Skolmen Ryg
1991	Knut Andersen
1992	Eilert Stensby
1994	Unni Straume
1995	Madeleine Fant
1996	Karl Juliusson
1997	Erling Thurmann-Andersen
1998	Siw Järbyn
1999	Randall Meyers
2000	Pål Gengenbach
2001	Mongoland
2002	John Erik Kaada
2003	Billy Johanson
2004	Morten Skallerud
2005	Jan Lindvik
2006	Binne Thoresen
2007	Aslaug Holm
2008	John Christian Rosenlund
2009	Malte Wadman
2010	Andrzej Kiwala
2011	Celine Engebrigtsen, Kjersti Paulsen
2012	Kortfilmfestivalen i Grimstad
2013	Irmelin Wister
2014	June Paalgard
2015	Harald Mæle
2016	Norsk Fil Kostyme
2017	Inge-Lise Langfeldt
2018	Veslemøy Fosse Ree

=== The Amanda Committee's Honorary Award ===
Year	Recipient
1985	Bjørn Breigutu
1986	Arne Skouen
1987	Jack Fjeldstad
1988	Per Aabel
1989	Erik Borge and Erik Diesen
1990	Henki Kolstad
1991	Wenche Foss, Arve Opsahl and Leif Juster
1992	Liv Ullmann
1993	Bille August, Denmark
1994	Edith Carlmar
1995	Ivo Caprino and Bjarne Sandemose
1996	Nils R. Müller
1997	Knut Bohwim and Aud Schønemann
1998	Egil Monn-Iversen
1999	Toralv Maurstad
2000	Bjørn Sundquist
2001	Kari Simonsen
2002	Rolv Wesenlund and Pål Bang-Hansen
2003	John M. Jacobsen
2004	Espen Skjønberg
2005	Anja Breien
2006	Jorunn Kjellsby
2007	Knut Andersen
2008	Knut Erik Jensen
2009	Kjersti Holmen, Helge Jordal and Sverre Anker Ousdal
2010	Henny Moan
2011	Bjørn Floberg
2012	Joachim Calmeyer
2013	Bent Hamer
2014	Elsa Lystad
2015	Vibeke Løkkeberg
2016	Anne Marit Jacobsen
2017	Axel Helgeland
2018	Lars Saabye Christensen

== Discontinued awards ==
=== Best Film (Nordic) ===
Year	Film	Director	Country
1993	Telegrafisten	Erik Gustavson	Norway
1994	Movie Days	Fridrik Thor Fridriksson	Iceland
1995	Høst i Paradiset	Richard Hobert	Sweden
1996	Breaking the Waves	Lars von Trier	Denmark
1997	Djeveløya	Fridrik Thor Fridriksson	Iceland
1998	Festen	Thomas Vinterberg	Denmark
1999	Mifunes sidste sang	Søren Kragh-Jacobsen	Denmark
2000	Seven Songs from the Tundra	Anastasia Lapsui and Markku Lehmuskallio	Finland

=== Best Television Drama ===
Year	Film	Director
1985	Alma	Christian Brym
1986	Du kan da ikke bare gå	Terje Mærli
1987	Fri	Carl Jørgen Kiønig
1988	Av måneskinn gror det ingenting	Arild Brinchmann
1989	Fugleelskerne	Terje Mærli
1990	Canto Libre	Pål Løkkeberg
1991	Dødsdansen	Bentein Baardson
1997	Asylet 3	Kjersti Normann
1998	Blodsbånd	Leidulv Risan
2000	Sejer – se deg ikke tilbake	Eva Isaksen
2001	4 høytider – Konfirmasjonen	Leidulv Risan
2002	Borettslaget	Vibeke Ringen
2003	Fox Grønland	Lars Berg
2004	Svarte penger – hvite løgner	Jarl Emsell
