= List of Norwegian submissions for the Academy Award for Best International Feature Film =

Best International Feature Film submissions from Norway

Highlights
- Debut: 1957
- Submissions: 48
- Nominations: 7
- Oscar winners: 1

Norway has submitted films in the Academy Award for Best International Feature Film (Note: The category was previously named the Academy Award for Best Foreign Language Film, but this was changed to the Academy Award for Best International Feature Film in April 2019, after the Academy deemed the word "Foreign" to be outdated.) category at the Oscars since 1957. They only submitted two films in their first twenty years, but they became a regular fixture in the competition in 1980, failing to submit a film only once, in 1983. The Academy Award for Best International Feature Film is handed out annually by the United States Academy of Motion Picture Arts and Sciences to a feature-length motion picture produced outside the United States that contains primarily non-English dialogue. It was not created until the 1956 Academy Awards, in which a competitive Academy Award of Merit, known as the Best Foreign Language Film Award, was created for non-English speaking films, and has been given annually since.

As of 2026, Norway has been nominated seven times, winning once for Sentimental Value (2025).

== Submissions ==
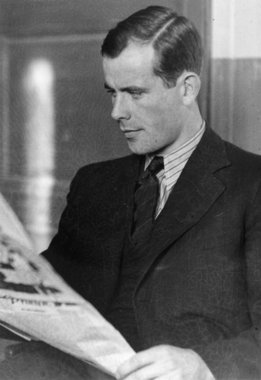
Arne Skouen directed Norway's first nominated film, Nine Lives.

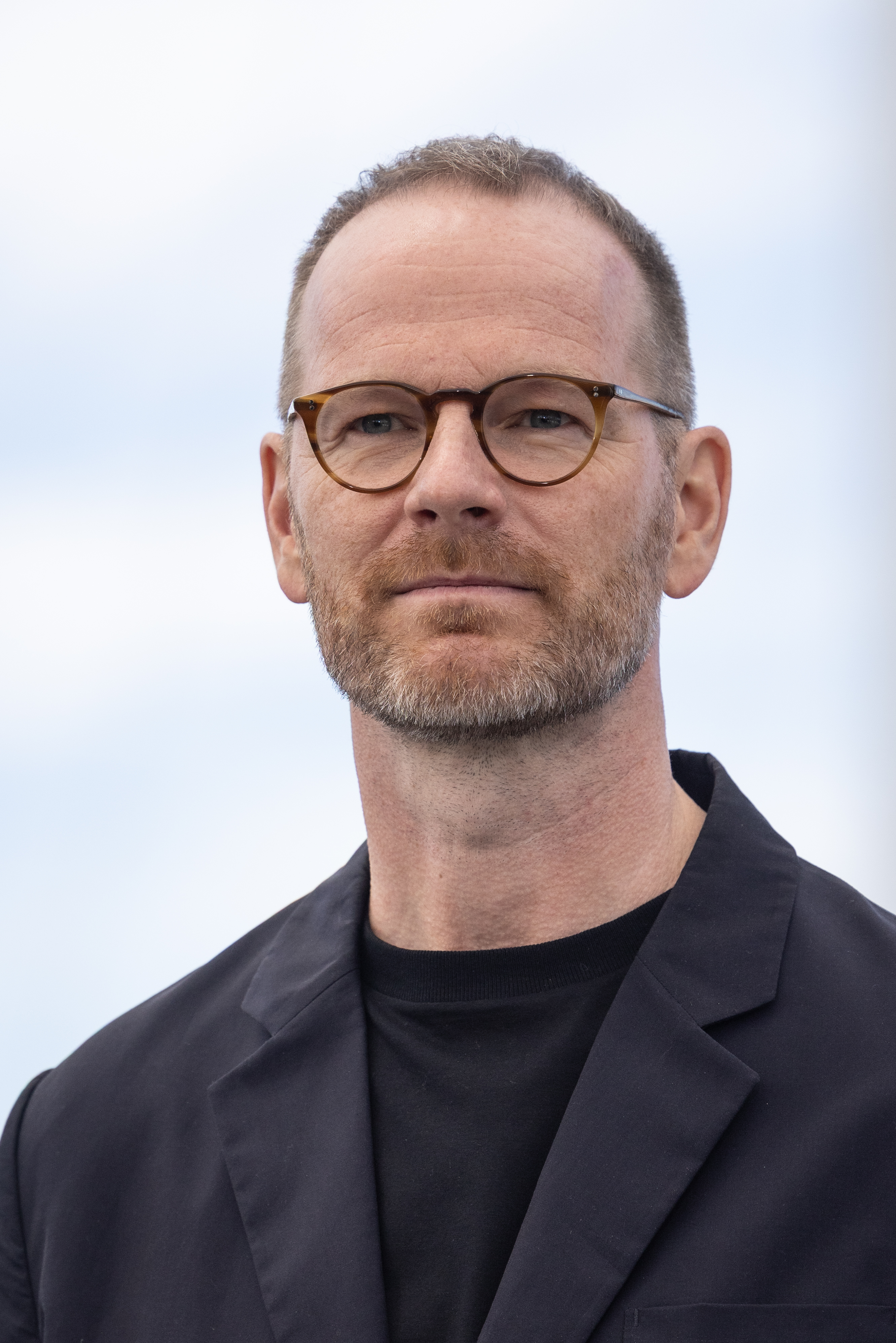
Joachim Trier directed Norway's first winning film, Sentimental Value.

The Academy of Motion Picture Arts and Sciences has invited the film industries of various countries to submit their best film for the Academy Award for Best International Feature Film since 1956. The International Feature Film Committee oversees the process and reviews all the submitted films. Following this, they vote via secret ballot to determine the five nominees for the award.

Norway was nominated for the first time for Nine Lives (1957), directed by Jan Baalsrud. Thirty years later, The Pathfinder (1987), directed by Nils Gaup, was the country second nomination.

Joachim Trier had four films submitted and was nominated twice, for The Worst Person in the World (2021), which was also nominated for Best Original Screenplay; and Sentimental Value (2025), which received nine nominations including Best Picture, Best Director and Best Original Screenplay.

The King's Choice (2016), Hope (2019), and Armand (2024), advanced to the December shortlists, but were not nominated.

Most of the films submitted are primary in Norwegian. Below is a list of the films that have been submitted by Norway for review by the academy for the award by the year of the submission and the respective Academy Award ceremony.

Year (Ceremony)	Film title used in nomination	Original title	Director	Result
1957 (30th)	Nine Lives	Ni Liv	Arne Skouen	Nominated
1962 (35th)	Cold Tracks	Kalde spor	Arne Skouen	Not nominated
1980 (53rd)	Life and Death	Liv og død	Petter Vennerød and Svend Wam	Not nominated
1981 (54th)	Julia Julia		Petter Vennerød and Svend Wam	Not nominated
1982 (55th)	Victoria L	Leve sitt liv	Petter Vennerød and Svend Wam	Not nominated
1984 (57th)	The Chieftain	Høvdingen	Terje Kristiansen	Not nominated
1985 (58th)	Wives – Ten Years After	Hustruer – ti år etter	Anja Breien	Not nominated
1986 (59th)	Hard Asphalt	Hard asfalt	Sølve Skagen	Not nominated
1987 (60th)	The Pathfinder	Ofelaš	Nils Gaup	Nominated
1988 (61st)	The Ice Palace	Is-slottet	Per Blom	Not nominated
1989 (62nd)	A Handful of Time	En håndfull tid	Martin Asphaug	Not nominated
1990 (63rd)	Herman		Erik Gustavson	Not nominated
1991 (64th)	Frida – Straight from the Heart	Frida – med hjertet i hånden	Berit Nesheim	Not nominated
1992 (65th)	The Warrior's Heart	Krigerens hjerte	Leidulv Risan	Not nominated
1993 (66th)	The Telegraphist	Telegrafisten	Erik Gustavson	Not nominated
1994 (67th)	Cross My Heart and Hope to Die	Ti kniver i hjertet	Marius Holst	Not nominated
1995 (68th)	Kristin Lavransdatter	Kristin Lavransdatter	Liv Ullmann	Not nominated
1996 (69th)	The Other Side of Sunday	Søndagsengler	Berit Nesheim	Nominated
1997 (70th)	Junk Mail	Budbringeren	Pål Sletaune	Not nominated
1998 (71st)	Only Clouds Move the Stars	Bare skyer beveger stjernene	Torun Lian	Not nominated
1999 (72nd)	The Prompter	Suffløsen	Hilde Heier	Not nominated
2000 (73rd)	Odd Little Man	Da jeg traff Jesus... med sprettert	Stein Leikanger	Not nominated
2001 (74th)	Elling		Petter Næss	Nominated
2002 (75th)	Hold My Heart	Tyven, tyven	Trygve Allister Diesen	Not nominated
2003 (76th)	Kitchen Stories	Salmer fra kjøkkenet	Bent Hamer	Not nominated
2004 (77th)	Hawaii, Oslo		Erik Poppe	Not nominated
2005: (78th)	Kissed by Winter	Vinterkyss	Sara Johnsen	Not nominated
2006 (79th)	Reprise		Joachim Trier	Not nominated
2007 (80th)	Gone with the Woman	Tatt av Kvinnen	Petter Næss	Not nominated
2008 (81st)	O' Horten		Bent Hamer	Not nominated
2009 (82nd)	Max Manus		Joachim Rønning and Espen Sandberg	Not nominated
2010 (83rd)	Angel	Engelen	Margreth Olin	Not nominated
2011 (84th)	Happy, Happy	Sykt lykkelig	Anne Sewitsky	Not nominated
2012 (85th)	Kon-Tiki		Joachim Rønning and Espen Sandberg	Nominated
2013 (86th)	I Am Yours	Jeg er din	Iram Haq	Not nominated
2014 (87th)	1001 Grams	1001 Gram	Bent Hamer	Not nominated
2015 (88th)	The Wave	Bølgen	Roar Uthaug	Not nominated
2016 (89th)	The King's Choice	Kongens Nei	Erik Poppe	Made shortlist
2017 (90th)	Thelma		Joachim Trier	Not nominated
2018 (91st)	What Will People Say	Hva vil folk si	Iram Haq	Not nominated
2019 (92nd)	Out Stealing Horses	Ut og stjæle hester	Hans Petter Moland	Not nominated
2020 (93rd)	Hope	Håp	Maria Sødahl	Made shortlist
2021 (94th)	The Worst Person in the World	Verdens verste menneske	Joachim Trier	Nominated
2022 (95th)	War Sailor	Krigsseileren	Gunnar Vikene	Not nominated
2023 (96th)	Songs of Earth	Fedrelandet	Margreth Olin	Not nominated
2024 (97th)	Armand		Halfdan Ullmann Tøndel	Made shortlist
2025 (98th)	Sentimental Value	Affeksjonsverdi	Joachim Trier	Won Academy Award
2026 (99th)	Growth of the Soil'	Markens Grøde	Hans Petter Moland	Pending

== Shortlisted films ==
Each year since 2010, the Norwegian Oscar Committee has announced a three-film shortlist prior to announcing the official Norwegian Oscar candidate. The following films were shortlisted by Norway but not selected as the final candidate:

Year	Film
2010	Limbo · A Somewhat Gentle Man
2011	Oslo, 31 August · Sons of Norway
2012	I Belong · The Orheim Company
2013	It's Only Make Believe · Pioneer
2014	Blind · Letter to the King
2015	Homesick · Returning Home
2016	Pyromaniac · Welcome to Norway
2017	Hunting Flies · Tree Feller
2018	Blind Spot · Utøya: July 22
2019	Beware of Children · Harajuku
2020	Disco · Self-Portrait
2021	Betrayed · Ninjababy
2022	Everybody Hates Johan · Sick of Myself
2023	A Happy Day · Let the River Flow
2024	Quisling: The Final Days · Sex
2025	Dreams (Sex Love) · Facing War
2026	Low Expectations · Trango

== See also ==
- List of Academy Award winners and nominees for Best International Feature Film
- List of Academy Award-winning foreign language films
- Cinema of Norway
