= Cinema of Norway =

- No. of screens: 422 (2011)
  - Per capita: 9.6 per 100,000 (2011)
- Main distributors: SF Norge 23.0% The Walt Disney Company Nordisk Film 21.0% United International Pictures 17.0%

Produced feature films (2011)
- Fictional: 31 (88.6%)
- Animated: –
- Documentary: 4 (11.4%)

Number of admissions (2013)
- Total: 11,802,662
  - Per capita: 2.3 (2013)
- National films: 2,690,110 (22.8%)

Gross box office (2013)
- Total: NOK 1.1 billion (~€113.8 million)
- National films: NOK 222 million (~€23.1 million) (20.3%)

Cinema in Norway has a long history, dating back to the beginning of the 20th century, and has an important stance in European cinema, contributing at least 30 feature-length films a year.

There have been over 1,050 films made in Norway ever since cinema's first introduction to the country in 1907.

Some of these films have been selected for the most prestigious film festivals around the world such as Cannes Film Festival, Toronto Film Festival, and Venice Film Festival. Fourteen Norwegian films have garnered Academy Award nominations. Two of them won the award: Thor Heyerdahl's Kon-Tiki for Best Documentary Feature Film in 1951, and Torill Kove's The Danish Poet for Best Animated Short Film in 2006.

The first domestically produced Norwegian film was a short about fishermen, Fiskerlivets farer ("The Dangers in a Fisherman's Life"), dating from 1908. The first feature was released in 1911, produced by Halfman Nobel Roede. In 1931 Tancred Ibsen, grandson of playwright Henrik Ibsen, presented Norway's first feature-length sound film, Den store barnedåpen ("The Great Christening"). Throughout the 1930s, Ibsen dominated the nation's film industry. Fellow film director Leif Sinding was also very successful during this period. Ibsen produced conventional melodramas more or less on the model of Hollywood films.

Notable filmmakers of modern Norway include Joachim Trier, a three-time Palme d'Or contender and Academy Award-winning filmmaker, best known for directing the internationally acclaimed Oslo Trilogy, consisting of Reprise (2006), Oslo, August 31st (2011), and The Worst Person in the World (2021). His film Sentimental Value (2025) won the Academy Award for Best International Feature Film, becoming the first Norwegian film to do so.

Other notable directors include: Morten Tyldum, Eskil Vogt, Bent Hamer, Nils Gaup and Espen Sandberg.

== Notable films ==
=== 1900s ===
- Fiskerlivets farer (1908)

=== 1920s ===
- Pan (1922)
- Troll-elgen (1927)
- Laila (1929)

=== 1930s ===
- Den store barnedåpen (1931)
- To levende og en død (1937)
- Gjest Baardsen (1939)

=== 1940s ===
- Tante Pose (1940)
- Bastard (1940)
- Tørres Snørtevold (1940)
- Den forsvundne pølsemaker (1941)
- Det grodde fram (1947)
- Døden er et kjærtegn (1949)

=== 1950s ===
- Kon-Tiki (1950)
- Aldri annet enn bråk (1954)
- Ni Liv (Nine Lives) (1957)
- Fjols til fjells (Fools in the Mountains) (1957)
- De dødes Tjern (Lakes of the Dead) (1958)
- Jakten (The Chasers) (1959)

=== 1960s ===
- Mannen som ikke kunne le (The Man Who Could Not Laugh) (1968)

=== 1970s ===
- Olsenbanden tar gull (1972)
- Flåklypa Grand Prix (The Pinchcliffe Grand Prix) (1975)
- Lasse & Geir (1976)

=== 1980s ===
- Orions belte (Orion's Belt) (1985)
- Ofelaš (aka. Veiviseren, Pathfinder) (1987)

=== 1990s ===
- Døden på Oslo S (Oslo, Central Station) (1990)
- Mørketid (1994)
- Kjærlighetens kjøtere (Zero Kelvin) (1995)
- Søndagsengler (The Other Side of Sunday) (1996)
- Insomnia (1997)
- Junk Mail (1997)

=== 2000s ===
- Elling (2001)
- Heftig og begeistret (2001)
- Mongoland (2001)
- Villmark (Dark Woods) (2003)
- Salmer fra Kjøkkenet (Kitchen Stories) (2003)
- Buddy (2003)
- Hawaii, Oslo (2004)
- Den brysomme mannen (The Bothersome Man) (2006)
- Fritt Vilt (Cold Prey) (2006, sequels in 2008 and 2010)
- Reprise (2006)
- Den siste revejakta (2008)
- Rovdyr (Manhunt) (2008)
- Kautokeino-opprøret (The Kautokeino Rebellion) (2008)
- Max Manus (2008)
- Død Snø (Dead Snow) (2009)
- Knerten (Twigson) (2009)

=== 2010s ===
- Nokas (2010)
- Trolljegeren (Trollhunter) (2010)
- Kongen av Bastøy (King of Devil's Island) (2010)
- En ganske snill mann (A Somewhat Gentle Man) (2010)
- Hodejegerne (Headhunters) (2011)
- Oslo, August 31st (2011)
- Kon-Tiki (2012)
- Bølgen (The Wave) (2015)
- Kongens nei (The King's Choice) (2016)
- Utøya: July 22 (2018)
- Thelma (2017)

=== 2020s ===
- Verdens verste menneske (The Worst Person in the World) (2021)
- De uskyldige (The Innocents) (2021)
- Troll (2022)
- Syk Pike (Sick of Myself) (2022)
- Ninjababy (2021)
- Den Stygge Stesøsteren (The Ugly Stepsister) (2025)
- Affeksjonsverdi (Sentimental Value) (2025)

=== Notable short films ===
- The Spirit of Norway (1988)
- Året gjennom Børfjord (A Year Along the Abandoned Road) (1991)
- De beste går først (United We Stand) (2002)
- Sniffer (2006)
- Den danske dikteren (The Danish Poet) (2006)

== Actors ==
- Liv Ullmann
- Kristofer Hivju
- Ingrid Bolsø Berdal
- Henki Kolstad
- Maria Bonnevie
- Anders Baasmo Christiansen
- Wenche Foss
- Harald Heide-Steen Jr.
- Kristoffer Joner
- Helge Jordal
- Alfred Maurstad
- Toralv Maurstad
- Arve Opsahl
- Sverre Anker Ousdal
- Bjørn Sundquist
- Tobias Santelmann
- Trond Espen Seim
- Rolv Wesenlund
- Pia Tjelta
- Aksel Hennie
- Ane Dahl Torp
- Nicolai Cleve Broch
- Morten Rudå
- Anders Danielsen Lie
- Renate Reinsve
- Inga Ibsdotter Lilleaas
- Kristine Kujath Thorp

== Directors ==
- Martin Asphaug
- Anja Breien
- Edith Carlmar
- Ivo Caprino
- Eva Dahr
- Olav Dalgard
- Karoline Frogner
- Nils Gaup
- Erik Gustavson
- Bent Hamer
- Dag Johan Haugerud
- Gill Holland
- Marius Holst
- Tancred Ibsen
- Jens Lien
- Erik Løchen
- Vibeke Løkkeberg
- Hans Petter Moland
- Marja Bål Nango
- Petter Næss
- Sara Margrethe Oskal
- André Øvredal
- Erik Poppe
- Øyvind Sandberg
- Erik Skjoldbjærg
- Arne Skouen
- Ola Solum
- Joachim Trier
- Liv Ullmann
- Trond Espen Seim
- Roar Uthaug
- Petter Vennerød
- Tommy Wirkola
- Svend Wam
- Eskil Vogt
- Harald Zwart

== Other notable persons in the Norwegian film industry ==
- John M. Jacobsen (producer)
- Philip Øgaard (cinematographer)
- Svein Krøvel (cinematographer)

== Awards ==
The Norwegian equivalent of the Academy Awards is the Amanda award, which is presented during the annual Norwegian Film Festival in Haugesund. The prize was created in 1985. The Amanda award is presented in following categories: Best Norwegian Film, Best Directing, Best Male Actor, Best Female Actress, Best Film for Children and Youth, Best Screenplay, Best Short Film, Best Documentary (however, a documentary can also win the Best Film award), Best Foreign Film and an honorary award.

The documentary Kon-Tiki by Thor Heyerdahl received the Academy Award for Documentary Feature at the 24th Academy Awards in 1951, Norway's first ever Academy Award win. In 2006 the Norwegian/Canadian animated short film The Danish Poet, directed by Norwegian Torill Kove and narrated by Norwegian screen legend Liv Ullmann, won an Academy Award for Animated Short Film, and became the second Norwegian production to receive an Academy Award. At the 98th Academy Awards, Sentimental Value, directed by Joachim Trier, won the Academy Award for Best International Feature Film, Norway's first win in the category.

As of 2026, seven films from Norway have been nominated for the Academy Award for Best International Feature Film, including its first win in 2026: Nine Lives (1957), The Pathfinder (1987), The Other Side of Sunday (1996), Elling (2001), Kon-Tiki (2012), The Worst Person in the World (2021) and Sentimental Value (2025).

== Film festivals ==
- Arctic Film Festival, Svalbard
- Bergen International Film Festival, Bergen
- Kosmorama – Trondheim International Film Festival, Trondheim
- Kristiansand International Children's Film Festival, Kristiansand
- Norwegian International Film Festival, Haugesund
- Tromsø International Film Festival, Tromsø

== Film commissions ==
- Western Norway Film Commission, Bergen

== Film schools ==
Film schools include:

- The Norwegian Filmschool in Lillehammer.

Other alternatives for more theoretical higher education in film include:

- Bachelor degree in Film- and TV-production at University of Bergen.
- Bachelor degree in Film Science at Norwegian University of Science and Technology.

There are also several more practical private film collages:

- Studies in Film- and TV-production at Noroff Institute
- Studies in Film- and TV-production at Nordic Institute of Stage and Studio (NISS)
- Studies in Film- and TV-production at Westerdals School of Communication

== See also ==
Awards

- Amanda Award

Festivals

- Norwegian International Film Festival

Institutions/Organizations

- Norwegian Film Institute

Lists

- List of Nordic Academy Award winners and nominees
- List of Norwegian actors
- List of Norwegian films
