= Petter Fladeby =

Norwegian film designer

- Born: Petter Mads Fladeby; 1 April 1961 (age 64); Denmark
- Citizenship: Norwegian
- Occupations: Sound designer and mixer
- Years active: 1975–present
- Awards: 2 Amanda Awards for "Best sound design", for O' Horten (2008) and Børning (2015)

Petter Mads Fladeby (born April 1, 1961, in Denmark) is a sound designer and mixer working mainly in Norwegian films. Fladeby received the Amanda Award for Best Sound Design in 2008 for the movie O' Horten, and in 2015 for the movie Børning.

== Filmography ==
- Department Q: A conspiracy of Faith (2016)
- Louder Than Bombs (2015)
- 1001 Grams (2014)
- Børning (2014)
- Call Girl (2012)
- Sons of Norway (2011)
- Headhunters (2011)
- King of Devil's Island (2010)
- Trollhunter (2010)
- Home for Christmas (2010)
- Trust Me (2010)
- Tuba Atlantic (2010)
- East End Angels (2010)
- A Somewhat Gentle Man (2010)
- Magic Silver (2009)
- Max Manus: Man of War (2008)
- Let the Right One In (2008)
- O' Horten (2007)
- 5 Lies (2007)
- Kill Buljo: The Movie (2007)
- Peter & the Wolf (2006)
- Storm (2005)
- Kissed by Winter (2005)
- The Beautiful Country (2004)
- Buddy (2003)
- Svidd neger (2003)
- Jonny Vang (2003)
- Kitchen Stories (2003)
- Prozac Nation (2001)
- Bride of the Wind (2001)
- Before the Storm (2000)
- Aberdeen (2000)
- Ballen i øyet (2000)
- Saving Grace (2000)
- Misery Harbour (1999)
- Sophie's World (1999)
- Suffløsen (1999)
- Absolute Hangover (1999)
- Cellofan - med døden til følge (1998)
- Sista kontraktet (1998)
- Burnt by Frost (1997)
- Body Troopers (1996)
- Zero Kelvin (1995)
- Dangerous Waters (1995)
- Over Stork og stein (1994)
- Cross My Heart and Hope to Die (1994)
- Secondløitnanten (1993)
- Sofie (1992)
- Det perfekte mord (1992)
- The Polar Bear King (1991)
- The White Viking (1991)
- A Year Along the Abandoned Road (1991)
- Herman (1990)
- A Handful of Time (1989)
- Dykket (1989)
- Brun bitter (1988)
- Blücher (1988)
- The Pinchcliffe Grand Prix (1975)

== Awards ==
List of award nominations
Year	Award	Category	Movie	Result	Ref(s).
2017	Amanda Award	Best sound design	Børning 2	Nominee	
2012	Guldbaggen Award	Best sound design	Call Girl	Won	
2015	Amanda Award	Best sound design	Børning	Won	
2008	Amanda Award	Best sound design	O' Horten	Won	
