= Finn Gjerdrum =

Norwegian film producer (born 1961)

- Born: 20 March 1961
- Occupation: Film producer, film actor
- Awards: (The King's Choice, Stein B. Kvae, 2016)

Finn Gjerdrum (born 20 March 1961, in Sandefjord) is a Norwegian film producer.

Gjerdrum started his career making short films with Bent Hamer. His first feature-length movie was Hamer's critically acclaimed Eggs, which was awarded the Amanda Award for best Norwegian film in 1995. Gjerdrum has produced several high profile, successful Norwegian movies, including In Order of Disappearance, A Somewhat Gentle Man, Troubled Water, The Last King and The King's Choice, as well as international production such as Dancer in the Dark, A Thousand Times Good Night and Stella Days. Together with Erik Poppe and Harald Rosenløw-Eeg, Gjerdrum was nominated for the Nordic Council Film Prize in 2005, for the film Hawaii, Oslo, but lost to Manslaughter.

== Filmography ==
- 2020 - Utmark (TV Series) (producer) (pre-production)
- 2019 - Cold Pursuit (producer - produced by)
- 2018 - Utøya: July 22 (producer)
- 2018 - Per Fugelli: Siste resept (Documentary) (producer)
- 2017 - Ekspedisjon Knerten (producer)
- 2016 - The King's Choice (producer)
- 2016 - The Last King (executive producer) / (producer)
- 2015 - My Name Is Emily (co-producer)
- 2014 - In Order of Disappearance (executive producer) / (producer)
- 2013 - 1,000 Times Good Night (executive producer) / (producer)
- 2013 - Mormor og de åtte ungene (producer)
- 2013 - Before Snowfall (producer)
- 2012 - Outside Comfort (Short) (producer)
- 2011 - Stella Days (co-producer)
- 2011 - Knerten i knipe (producer)
- 2010 - Twigson Ties the Knot (producer)
- 2010 - Pax (producer)
- 2010 - A Somewhat Gentle Man (producer)
- 2009 - Rottenetter (producer)
- 2009 - Knerten (producer)
- 2009 - Spøkelset Martin (Documentary short) (producer)
- 2008 - Fatso (producer)
- 2008 - Troubled Water (producer)
- 2007 - Supernova (Short) (producer)
- 2007 - Andre omgang (producer)
- 2006 - Nora (Short) (producer)
- 2006 - Animal Alpha: Bundy (Short) (producer)
- 2005 - Pitbullterje (producer)
- 2005 - The Giant (Documentary) (executive producer) / (producer)
- 2004 - Hawaii, Oslo (producer)
- 2004 - Cry in the Woods (executive producer) / (producer)
- 2003 - The Beast of Beauty (producer)
- 2003 - Bulle bare bor her (Short) (producer)
- 2002 - Scars (producer)
- 2001 - Syndare i sommarsol (co-producer)
- 2001 - Stuck (Short) (producer)
- 2000 - Prop and Berta (co-producer)
- 2000 - Dancer in the Dark (associate producer)
- 1998 - Bloody Angels (producer)
- 1998 - Bunch of Five (producer)
- 1998 - Water Easy Reach (executive producer)
- 1995 - Eggs (producer)
