= Blackout (1986 film) =

1986 film

- Directed by: Erik Gustavson
- Written by: Erik Gustavson; Eirik Ildahl
- Starring: Henrik Scheele; Juni Dahr
- Release date: 27 February 1986 (Norway)
- Running time: 87 minutes
- Country: Norway
- Language: Norwegian

Blackout is a 1986 Norwegian Film noir directed by Erik Gustavson, starring Henrik Scheele and Juni Dahr. The film follows the private investigator Werner (Scheele) as he deals with a beautiful but dangerous woman, a brutal chief of police and a gangster boss.

== Overview ==
A police officer suspects that a local husband and father who has recently undergone facial surgery because of injuries received in a car accident is in reality the same man who committed a quadruple murder several years before.
