= Jan Trygve Røyneland =

Norwegian television and film writer (born 1981)

- Born: 4 June 1981 (age 45); Lillesand Municipality, Norway
- Occupation: Screenwriter
- Children: Karl Olav, Ronja
- Awards: The Kanon Award for Best Script (2016); Amanda Awards Best Original Screenplay (2017)

Jan Trygve Røyneland (born 4 June 1981) is a Norwegian television and film writer. His notable works include The Kings Choice, a film that depicted how Norway entered World War II. For this film, Røyneland was awarded the Amanda Prize for Best Original Screenplay.

== Background ==
Røyneland was born on June 4, 1981, in Lillesand Municipality in Aust-Agder, Norway. He completed a screenplay writing study track at the Norwegian Film School in 2010. On Christmas eve of 2010, he was offered the job of assistant to Erik Poppe, and began working full-time for the Norwegian film company Paradox.

== Career and awards ==
Røyneland wrote the short films Cut Paste (2008) and Om Avstand (2010); co-wrote Tusen ganger god natt (2013); and, wrote all 26 episodes of the 2013-14 television series Kampen. He also contributed to the internationally recognized and controversial TV series Okkupert (Occupied, 2015), which depicted the Russian invasion of Norway.

He has won a number of “pitching contests” at film festivals, including a 2011 contest in which he pitched the idea for Kongens Nei (The King's Choice). It tells the story of Norway's King Haakon VII's refusal to collaborate with the Nazis when they invaded the country in 1940. The script was written for three years and the film production was delayed due to the cost involved. Filming was also postponed to wait for Jesper Christensen, who played the king, because the actor was busy filming a James Bond film. The King's Choice, which was co-written with Harald Rosenløw Eeg and directed by Erik Poppe, was released in 2016.

The King's Choice became Norway's highest grossing film that year and it was seen in theaters by 700,000 of the nation's five million inhabitants. It went on to be shortlisted in the Foreign Language Film category at the Academy Awards. In an interview, Røyneland described how The King's Choice depicted a story of a people living in a war-torn country and how Norway got help from Sweden and the United Kingdom. These, he said, explain the Norwegian mindset towards refugees today.

In 2013, Røyneland won the Pitch Competition at the Kosmorama Film Festival with a pitch for a film entitled Confidential Business Proposal, the story of a retired Norwegian widower and veteran who, after being cheated by a Nigeria-based Internet scam, travels to that country to recover his money and finds that the skills he picked up in wartime prove useful in that effort.

Røyneland, together with Eeg, won The Kanon Award (Kanonprisen) for Best Script in 2016. At the 2017 Haugesund Film Festival, Røyneland and Eeg also won the Amanda Prize for Best Original Screenplay for The King's Choice. The film received a total of seven Amanda Prizes, breaking the record previously held by another war film, Max Manus: Man of War. In the same year, Twigson the Explorer, a film that he co-wrote with Lars Kilevold was also released.

Røyneland is also the writer of the upcoming television adaptation of Carsten Jensen's bestselling novel We, The Drowned, which is being directed by Mikael Salomon.

== Personal life ==
Røyneland lives in Copenhagen with his wife Diana and his children Karl Olav and Ronja.

== Writing credits ==
Film/TV	Notes	Production company
Cut Paste	"Short film" (2008)	Den Norske Filmskolen
Om Avstand	Short film (2010)	
1,000 Times Good Night	Film (co-written with Erik Poppe and Harald Rosenløw-Eeg, 2013)	Paradox Spillefilm
Kampen (The Games)	"Kampen for Sara" (2014); "Kampen mot kvisa" (2014); "Kampen for videokvelden" (2014); "Kampen mot busa" (2014); "Kampen for å sniklese" (2014)	Ape&Bjørn
Occupied	Television series (2015)	TV2 Norge, Viaplay, Yellow Bird
The King's Choice	Film (2016) (co-written with Harald Rosenløw-Eeg)	Paradox, Film i Väst, Newgrange Pictures
Ekspedisjon Knerten (Twigson, the Explorer)	Film (2017) (co-written with Lars Kilevold)	Paradox Rettigheter AS
The Spy	Film (upcoming) (co-written with Harald Rosenløw-Eeg)	4 1/2 Film
