= Harald Rosenløw Eeg =

Norwegian novelist and scriptwriter (born 1970)

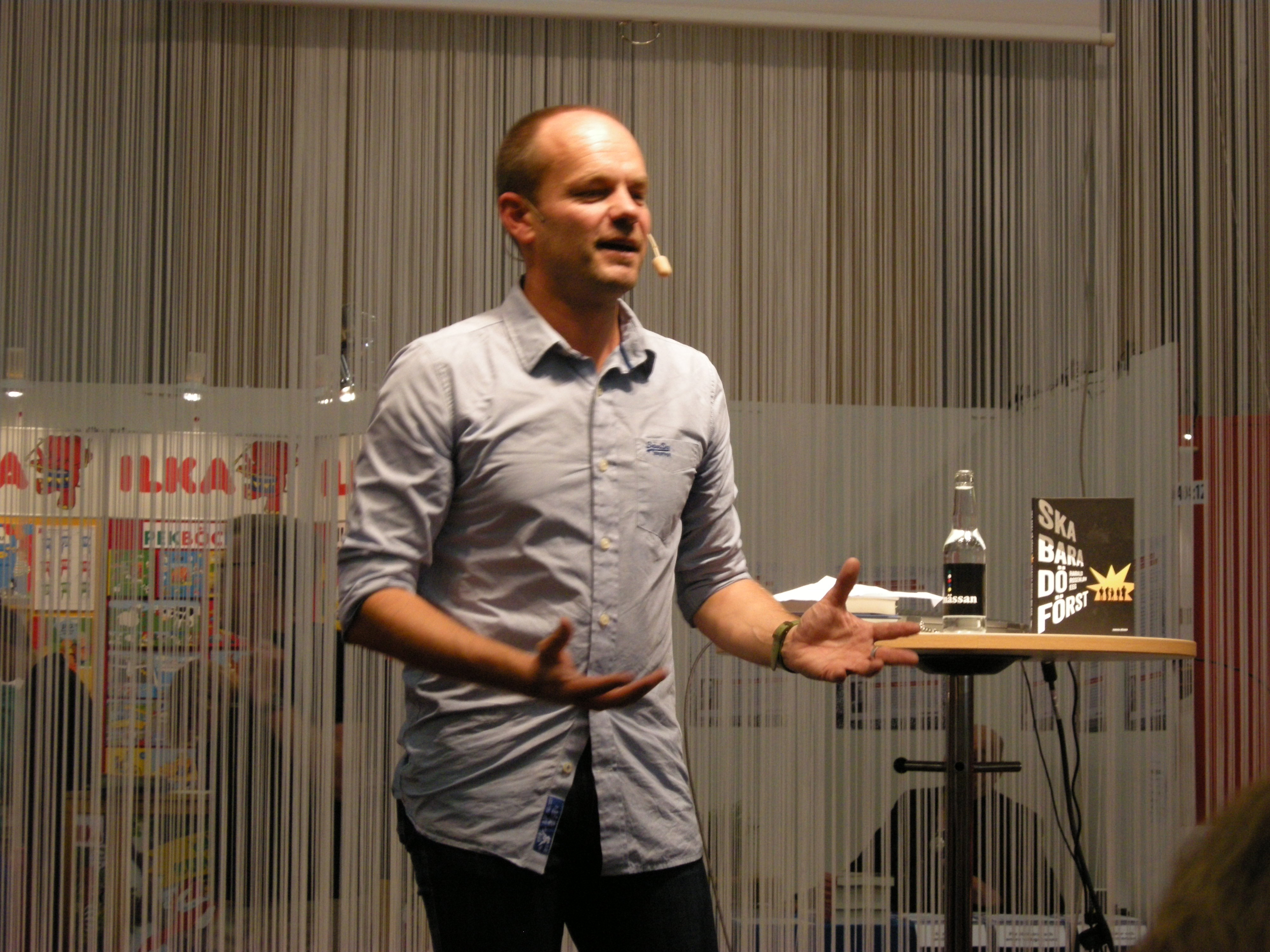
- Harald Rosenløw Eeg at Gothenburg Book Fair 2012
- Born: 18 August 1970 (age 56); Tønsberg, Norway
- Occupations: Novelist, script writer
- Writing career
- Period: 1995–present
- Genre: Youth novels

Harald Rosenløw Eeg (born 18 August 1970) is a Norwegian novelist and script writer. He made his literary début in 1995 with the youth novel Glasskår, for which he was awarded the Tarjei Vesaas' debutantpris. Eeg also wrote the script for a film with the same name from 2002. He wrote the script for Hawaii, Oslo, directed by Erik Poppe and released in 2004, and for the film Uro from 2006, directed by Stefan Faldbakken. The 2008 film Troubled Water, directed by Poppe, was based on a script by Eeg. The film won the audience prize for best narrative feature film at the 16th Hamptons International Film Festival in 2008.

Eeg was awarded the Brage Prize in 2004 for the youth novel Yatzy.

Awards
Preceded by Eirik Newth	Recipient of the Brage Prize for children and youth 1997	Succeeded by Stein Erik Lunde
Preceded by Helga Gunerius Eriksen; Gry Moursund	Recipient of the Brage Prize for children and youth 2004	Succeeded by Arne Svingen
