= Stella Days =

- Film poster
- Directed by: Thaddeus O'Sullivan
- Screenplay by: Corinne Le Hong
- Story by: Michael Doorley
- Produced by: Noëlette Buckley; Finn Gjerdrum; Stein B. Kvae; Jackie Larkin; Lesley McKimm; Thaddeus O'Sullivan; Maggie Pope; Meinolf Zurhorst
- Starring: Martin Sheen; Stephen Rea; Trystan Gravelle; Milly Plunkett; Tom Hickey; Joey O'Sullivan; Amy Huberman
- Cinematography: John Christian Rosenlund
- Edited by: Dermot Diskin
- Music by: Nicholas Hooper
- Distributed by: Tribeca Film
- Release dates: October 2011 (Busan); 9 March 2012 (Ireland)
- Running time: 87 minutes
- Country: Ireland
- Language: English
- Budget: $3,500,000 US

Stella Days is a 2011 film directed by Thaddeus O'Sullivan and starring Martin Sheen as a Catholic priest in rural Ireland during the mid-1950s.

The film is based on the book Stella Days: The Life and Times of a Rural Irish Cinema, written by Michael Doorley, which concerns the true story of how a small cinema came into being in the town of Borrisokane in County Tipperary. Filming took place in the town of Fethard rather than Borrisokane. The film was screened in front of an invited audience in the Clarke Memorial Hall, Borrisokane on 24 March 2012.
