= Beloved (2026 film) =

Norwegian drama film

- Norwegian: Kjærast
- Directed by: Erik Poppe
- Screenplay by: Jon Fosse
- Produced by: Finn Gjerdrum; Erik Poppe
- Starring: Leo de la Nuez; Kristi-Helene Engberg
- Production companies: Paradox; SF Studios; ReInvent Studios
- Release date: August 2026 (Norwegian International Film Festival)
- Countries: Denmark; Norway; Sweden

Beloved (Norwegian: Kjærast) is a 2026 Scandinavian film drama directed by Erik Poppe and written by Nobel Prize in Literature winner Jon Fosse, marking his first feature film screenplay. The cast is led by Leo de la Nuez and Kristi-Helene Engberg.

The film premiered at the 2026 Norwegian International Film Festival.

== Premise ==
The film follows a couple Gerd and Asle who have a son, but later separate with Asle working away on the sea for many months at a time, and how they cope with their circumstances.

== Cast ==
- Leo de la Nuez as Asle
- Kristi-Helene Engberg as Gerd

== Production ==
=== Development ===
The film is directed by Erik Poppe and is the first film screenplay written by Nobel Prize in Literature winner Jon Fosse. Fosse initially wrote the script in 1998, with Poppe saying in 2025 that "Only Jon and I have known about this script all these years", describing the script as a "beautiful and strong story, with a lot of passion and emotion. But it's also a story about how much distance love can endure".

In August 2024, Poppe was location scouting on the North-Western coast of Norway for the film. It is produced by Finn Gjerdrum and Poppe, with studios including ReInvent Studios, Paradox and SF Studios.

=== Filming ===
Principal photography took place in autumn 2025, with filming locations including the west coast of Norway and in the Västra Götaland region of Sweden and Grötö harbor in Lysekil.

=== Casting ===
In October 2025, Leo de la Nuez and Kristi-Helene Engberg were announced in the lead roles as the couple Asle and Gerd.

== Release ==
The film premiered at the 2026 Norwegian International Film Festival.
