= Maria Sødahl =

Norwegian film director

Maria Sødahl (born 31 December 1965) is a Norwegian film director and screenwriter who is best known for her internationally acclaimed film Hope (2019) and Limbo (2010). The former earned her the nomination of European Film Award for Best Director in 2020.

== Career ==
Sødahl debuted with the film Limbo in 2010. It was well-received and earned ten nominations at Amanda Awards, Norway's top film Awards. After a long hiatus of 9 years, she returned with the film Hope, which deals with a woman surviving cancer. It was set for a World Premiere at Toronto Film Festival. The film was selected as Norway's Official Submissions to Academy Awards.

== Personal life ==
Sødahl is married to film director Hans Petter Moland, with whom she has three children.

== Awards ==
- European Film Award for Best Director (2020) - nominated

== See also ==
- List of Norwegian submissions for the Academy Award for Best International Feature Film
