= Uno (2004 film) =

- Directed by: Aksel Hennie
- Starring: Aksel Hennie; Nicolai Cleve Broch; Bjørn Floberg
- Release date: 2004
- Country: Norway
- Language: Norwegian

Uno is a 2004 Norwegian drama film, directed by Aksel Hennie, who also stars in it. The film was hailed by critics, and won Hennie an Amanda Award for Best Director.

== Plot ==
The film centers around a group of young men who reside in an area of Oslo that is predominantly inhabited by immigrants. Best friends David and Morten work as gym instructors at Jarle's gym. Jarle is a sadistic small-time criminal, who, together with his son Lars, purchases and distributes anabolic steroids. Lars has ties with a notorious criminal Pakistani gang led by Khuram. The climax of the film takes place after Lars, Morten and David are arrested for possession of illegal drugs. David chooses to snitch on his friends in order to visit his dying father. The story escalates when Lars uses his influence on the Pakistani gang to retaliate. Lars also informs Khuram about Morten's alleged sexual intercourse with Khuram's sister, viewed as dishonourable by the Sharia law. The plot leaves the two best friends in a series of events that force them to run for their lives.

== Cast ==
- Aksel Hennie as David
- Nicolai Cleve Broch as Morten
- Bjørn Floberg as Jarle
- Espen Juul Kristiansen as Kjetil
- Ahmed Zeyan as Khuram
- Martin Skaug as Lars
