= Hope (2019 film) =

2019 film by Maria Sødahl

- Film poster
- Norwegian: Håp
- Directed by: Maria Sødahl
- Starring: Andrea Bræin Hovig; Stellan Skarsgård
- Production company: Zentropa Entertainments
- Release dates: 7 September 2019 (TIFF); 22 November 2019 (Norway)
- Running time: 126 minutes
- Country: Norway
- Language: Norwegian
- Box office: $2.7 million

Hope (Norwegian: Håp) is a 2019 Norwegian semi-autobiographical drama film directed by Maria Sødahl, based on the experience she faced with her husband, director Hans Petter Moland, when, nine years earlier, she had received a terminal diagnosis of brain cancer and was given by doctors only three months to live. The film was selected as the Norwegian entry for the Best International Feature Film at the 93rd Academy Awards, making the shortlist of fifteen films. The film premiered at the 44th Toronto International Film Festival on 7 September 2019 and was first theatrically released in Norway on 22 November 2019.

== Synopsis ==
A married couple must confront their long-neglected relationship when the wife is diagnosed with brain cancer.

== Cast ==
- Andrea Bræin Hovig as Anja
- Stellan Skarsgård as Tomas

== Reception ==
=== Box office ===
Hope grossed $0 in the United States and Canada, and a worldwide total of $2.7 million.

=== Critical response ===
On the review aggregator website Rotten Tomatoes, 98% of 49 critics' reviews are positive, with an average rating of 8.4/10. The website's consensus reads: "A movingly personal work from writer-director Maria Sødahl, Hope sees stars Bræin Hovig and Stellan Skarsgård powerfully portraying a turning point in one couple's long love story" Metacritic, which uses a weighted average, assigned the film a score of 87 out of 100, based on 17 critics, indicating "universal acclaim".

== Television series ==
In January 2021, it was reported that Amazon Studios has secured the rights to adapt the film into a series. The series is being adapted by Alice Bell, who will also serve as an executive producer with Nicole Kidman set to star and serve as an executive producer through her Blossom Films production company.

== See also ==
- List of submissions to the 93rd Academy Awards for Best International Feature Film
- List of Norwegian submissions for the Academy Award for Best International Feature Film
