= Cold Lunch =

2008 Norwegian drama film

- Directed by: Eva Sørhaug
- Written by: Per Schreiner
- Starring: Ane Dahl Torp; Pia Tjelta; Aksel Hennie; Bjørn Floberg; Nicolai Cleve Broch; Anneke von der Lippe
- Release date: 1 February 2008
- Running time: 90 minutes
- Country: Norway
- Language: Norwegian

Cold Lunch (Norwegian: Lønsj) is a 2008 Norwegian drama film directed by Eva Sørhaug, starring Ane Dahl Torp, Pia Tjelta and Aksel Hennie. It was Sørhaug's début as a director.

== Plot ==
The plot of Cold Lunch has multiple dramatic threads set off when Christer (Aksel Hennie) tries to stop a communal washing machine to retrieve rent money left in one of his pockets.

Removing a fuse from the building's main power supply sets in motion a number of events affecting the lives of residents in the building.

== Reception ==
Reviewers were somewhat split in their assessment of the film. In a review for Norwegian newspaper Dagbladet, Eirik Alver gave the movie a "die throw" of five and called it thematically "recognizable". Jon Selås of Verdens Gang gave it only three points, calling it a "uneven mix of ambitious, uncompromising will".
