= Andrea Berntzen =

Norwegian actress and student

- Born: 25 February 1998 (age 28)
- Occupations: Actress, student
- Years active: 2017 – present as an actress

Andrea Berntzen (born 25 February 1998) is a Norwegian actress and student.

As a student at her secondary school in Oslo, she participated as an actress in a school revue in 2017. She was awarded as the actress of the year in a competition between the year's school revues of Oslo.

After graduation, she was offered the lead role as the main character Kaja in the drama film Utøya: July 22, shot entirely in a single long-take. Her efforts in the role in the movie received praise at the Berlin Film Festival 2018 from Norwegian and international media. She later received the Norwegian Amanda Award 2018 for the best actress for this role. In the autumn of 2017 she started her education as an actress. In 2021, she played the role of Pia, in the Netflix web series The Girl from Oslo (TV series). In 2025, she played the role of Borghild Eriksen, the daughter of Colonel Birger Eriksen in the feature film The Battle of Oslo.
