= Western Norway Film Commission =

- Founded: 2003
- Region served: Western Norway
- Parent organization: Western Norway Film Fund
- Website: www.wnfc.no

Western Norway Film Commission (WNFC) was the first regional film commission in Norway, established in 2003. WNFC is supported by the counties of Møre og Romsdal and Vestland and provides free services to international film and TV productions considering filming in Western Norway. WNFC is a member of Association of Film Commissioners International, European Film Commission Network and Nordic Film Commissions.

The Western Norway Film Commission helped find the billionaire's estate in the wilderness for the 2014 film Ex Machina, which was shot at the Juvet Landscape Hotel near Ålesund. Other feature films and drama series shot on location in Western Norway includes Dune, No Time to Die, Black Widow, Ragnarok, Mission: Impossible - Fallout, The Innocents, Quo Vado? and Star Wars: The Empire Strikes Back.

WNFC has its offices in the cities of Bergen and Ålesund, and is a division of Western Norway Film Fund.
