= Ruby Dagnall =

Norwegian actress (born 2000)

- Born: 2000 (age 25–26)
- Occupation: Actress
- Awards: Amanda Award (2017, 2023)

Ruby Dagnall (born 2000) is a Norwegian actress. For her work she has won two Amanda Awards.

== Biography ==
She hails from Nesodden. Dagnall made her film debut in 2016, playing "Rosemary" in the film Rosemari, directed by Sara Johnsen. This role earned her the Amanda Award in 2017 for best actress.

She played the character "Emma" in Julie Andem’s television series Skam.

In 2023 she received her second Amanda Award for best actress for the film Den siste våren.
