= Frida – Straight from the Heart =

1991 film

- Directed by: Berit Nesheim
- Written by: Torun Lian
- Starring: Maria Kvalheim
- Release date: 21 August 1991
- Running time: 113 minutes
- Country: Norway
- Language: Norwegian

Frida – Straight from the Heart (Norwegian: Frida – med hjertet i hånden) is a 1991 Norwegian drama film directed by Berit Nesheim. The film was selected as the Norwegian entry for the Best Foreign Language Film at the 64th Academy Awards, but was not accepted as a nominee.

== Cast ==
- Maria Kvalheim as Frida
- Ellen Horn as Bente
- Helge Jordal as Karl
- Andreas Bratlie as Kristian
- Cathrine Bang as Kaisa
- Kristian Mejdell Nissen as Martin
- Jan Hårstad as Teacher Skar

== See also ==
- List of submissions to the 64th Academy Awards for Best Foreign Language Film
- List of Norwegian submissions for the Academy Award for Best Foreign Language Film
