= Wives – Ten Years After =

1985 film

- Directed by: Anja Breien
- Written by: Knut Faldbakken; Anja Breien
- Starring: Frøydis Armand
- Release date: 24 October 1985
- Running time: 88 minutes
- Country: Norway
- Language: Norwegian

Wives – Ten Years After (Norwegian: Hustruer – ti år etter) is a 1985 Norwegian drama film directed by Anja Breien. The film was selected as the Norwegian entry for the Best Foreign Language Film at the 58th Academy Awards, but was not accepted as a nominee.

== Plot synopsis ==
Ten years have passed since our three heroines' first outing in 1975. Now the women meet at yet another class reunion. Not surprisingly, they are still unwilling to call it a night after the party is over. Husbands and children must celebrate Christmas as best they can, while the women spend quality time drinking and taking stock of their lives.

== Cast ==
- Frøydis Armand as Heidrun
- Katja Medbøe as Kaja
- Anne Marie Ottersen as Mie
- Svein Wickstrøm as the travel agent

== See also ==
- List of submissions to the 58th Academy Awards for Best Foreign Language Film
- List of Norwegian submissions for the Academy Award for Best Foreign Language Film
