= Fiskerlivets farer =

- Directed by: Julius Jaenzon
- Written by: Peter Lykke-Seest
- Produced by: Hugo Hermansen
- Starring: Alma Lund; Henry Hagerup
- Cinematography: Julius Jaenzon
- Release date: 1908
- Running time: 7 to 8 minutes
- Country: Norway
- Language: Norwegian

Fiskerlivets farer (The Dangers in a Fisherman's Life) is a Norwegian film directed by Julius Jaenzon. Running between seven and eight minutes, it was the first film produced in Norway. The reported date of production varies, though the majority of sources state 1908.

The plot focuses on the plight of a fisherman and his wife trying, but ultimately failing, to save the life of their son who has fallen overboard in bad weather.

The original film is lost. A reconstructed version was filmed in 1954.

== Cast ==
- Henry Hagerup
- Alma Lund
