= Aksel Hennie =

Norwegian actor and filmmaker (born 1975)

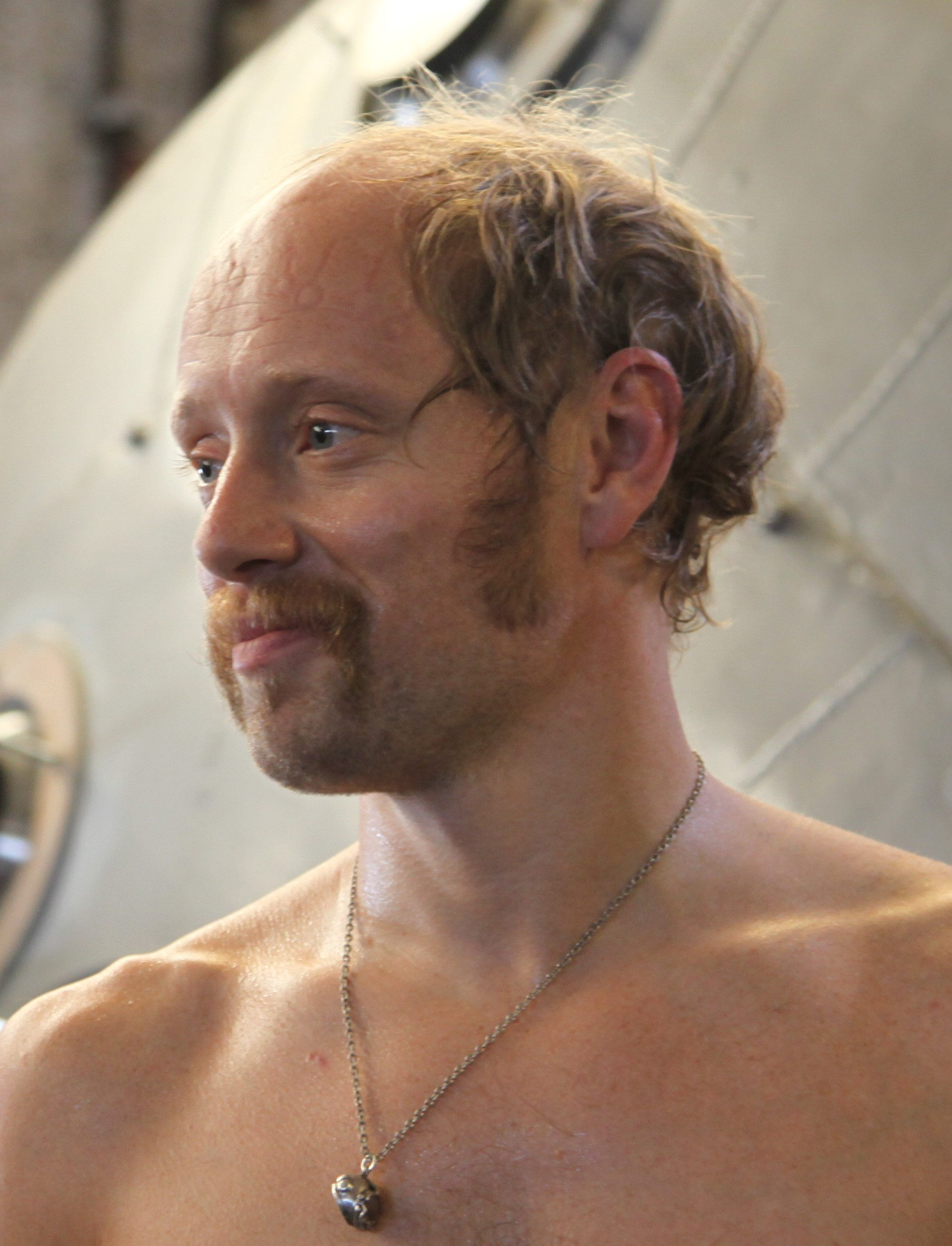
- Hennie in 2012
- Born: 29 October 1975 (age 51); Oslo, Norway
- Occupations: Actor, director, screenwriter
- Years active: 1998-present
- Spouse: Karoline Hegbom (m. 2019)
- Children: 3

Aksel Hennie (born 29 October 1975) is a Norwegian actor, director, and screenwriter. He is best known for his roles in the films Uno (2004), Max Manus (2008), Hercules (2014), and The Martian (2015).

== Early life ==
Hennie was born in the Lambertseter suburb of Oslo on 29 October 1975. In his late teens, he was arrested for graffitiing, and became an outcast in the graffiti community after confessing to the police. His "writes" or signatures were "Ceel" and "Mikro" and can still be seen around Oslo. Most of them are crossed out or lined over because of his confession. This personal story contributed much of the background for the film Uno. The conviction against Hennie was one of the first such cases in Norway.

== Career ==
Hennie was admitted to the Norwegian National Academy of Theatre after applying four times. He graduated in 2001, and has acted both at Teatret Vårt in Molde (2001–2002) and at Oslo Nye Teater (since 2002), where he has been in plays such as Hamlet and Kvinnen Som Gifftet Seg Med en Kalkun (The Woman Who Married a Turkey).

Hennie's most notable success has been as a film actor. He made his debut starring in the feature film Jonny Vang in 2003. Although the director, Jens Lien, originally thought Hennie was too young for the role, the actor convinced him he was the right man for the film. That same year, he also acted in the films Buddy and Ulvesommer. The next year, Hennie made his debut as a director and writer with the film, Uno, in which he also acted. For this role, Hennie and his co-star, Nicolai Cleve Broch, undertook six months of hard physical training in order to perform convincingly as bodybuilders.

In 2001, Hennie was named "Theatre Talent of the Year" by the newspaper Dagbladet. Hennie won the Amanda Award (an important Norwegian film award), for "Best Direction" for Uno in 2005. That year he was among the nominees for "Best Actor" and "Best Film." He won an Amanda Award for "Best Actor" for Jonny Vang in 2003. He was named one of European film's "Shooting Stars" by the European Film Promotion in 2004.

In 2008, Hennie starred in Max Manus, where he played the Norwegian war hero of the same name. The film had a large budget by Norwegian standards. In 2011, Age of Heroes was released, a World War II film primarily shot in Norway. On 30 August 2013, Pionér, a docudrama, was released. Hennie plays the main role as a commercial offshore diver in the North Sea during the 1970s who witnesses an accident while diving under extreme conditions, prompting him to search for answers.

On 1 December 2013, Hennie won an Angela Award at the Subtitle European Film Festival in Kilkenny for his role in the film 90 Minutes. That evening he appeared at a showing of Headhunters, and did a question and answer session with the audience in the theatre after the film.

== Personal life ==
Aksel Hennie married former squash player, Karoline Hegbom on 6 September 2019. His cousin Kalle Hennie is also an actor.

== Filmography ==
Year	Title	Role	Notes
1990–98	Bobby's Verden		
1998	1732 Høtten	Arnt-Olaf	
2000	Fort Forover	Even	Short film
2002	Anolit	Stefan	Short film
2003	Buddy	Geir	
2003	Jonny Vang	Jonny Vang	
2003	Ulvesommer	Pål	
2004	Den Som Frykter Ulven	Stefan	
2004	Hawaii, Oslo	Trygve	
2004	Uno	David	Also directed
2004	Tell me everything goes well	Smith	Short film
2004	The one who fears the wolf	Stefan	
2005	Terkel in Trouble		In the Norwegian dub, all voices were performed by actor Aksel Hennie
2005	The Hardest Words In The World	The Husband	Short film
2007	Torpedo (TV series)	Sebastian	
2008	Kurt Turns Evil	Bud	
2008	Max Manus: Man of War	Max Manus	
2008	Salary	Christer	
2008	In a mirror, in a riddle	Enge	
2010	A Somewhat Gentle Man	Samí	
2011	Headhunters	Roger Brown	
2011	Age of Heroes	Lieutenant Steinar Mortensen	
2012	90 minutter	Trond	
2013	Pioneer	Petter Jensen	
2014	24	Karl Rask	Day 9: 4:00pm–5:00pm
2014	Hercules	Tydeus	
2015	Last Knights	Geza Mott	
2015	The Martian	Dr. Alex Vogel	
2016	Nobel	Erling Riiser	NOMINATED- 2017 Gullruten Best Actor, TV Drama
2016	Smuggler	Arthur Omre	
2018	The Cloverfield Paradox	Volkov	
2018	Mordene i Kongo	Joshua French	
2020	The Doorman	Borz	
2020	White Wall	Lars Ruud	
2021	The Trip/ I Onde Dager	Lars	
2021	The Middle Man	Arthur Clintstone	
2022	Sisu	Bruno Helldorf	Finnish film
2022	Kent State		
2024	Spermageddon	Simen	Voice role
2024	Stayer	Even Elstad	Starring role (two seasons, twelve episodes), also director (seven episodes)
TBA	The Boy in the Iron Box †		Post-production

== Theatre ==
Year	Title	Role	Director	Theatre
2022–23	Peer Gynt (written by Henrik Ibsen)	Actor	Per Olav Sörensen	Gålå

== Awards and nominations ==
Year	Organization	Category	Nominee(s)	Result	Ref.
2001	Dagbladet	Theatre Talent of the Year	Himself	Won	
2003	Brussels European Film Festival	Best Actor	Himself for Jonny Vang	Won	
2003	Amanda Award	Best Male Lead	Himself for Jonny Vang	Won	
2004	Viareggio EuropaCinema	FIPRESCI Prize	Himself for Uno	Won	
2004	Molodist Film Festival	Best Actor	Himself for Uno	Nominated	
2004	Molodist Film Festival	Best Young Actor	Himself for Uno	Won	
2004	Nordic Filmtage Lübeck	Church Film Prize	Himself for Uno	Won	
2005	Amanda Award	Best Director	Himself for Uno	Won	
2005	Amanda Award	Best Male Actor	Himself for Uno	Nominated	
2005	Festival Premiers Plans d'Angers	Special Jury Prize	Himself for Uno	Won	
2005	Cinequest Film Festival	Best First Feature Award	Himself for Uno	Won	
2005	Nordic Film Festival	Jury's Grand Prix	Himself for Uno	Won	
2005	Kosmorama Film Festival	The Canon Prize for Best	Himself for Uno	Won	
2005	Kosmorama Film Festival	The best prize	Himself for Uno	Won	
2005	Palic International Film Festival	Silver Tower	Himself for Uno	Won	
2008	Amanda Award	Best Male Actor	Himself for Cold Lunch	Nominated	
2009	Amanda Award	Best Male Actor	Himself for Max Manus: Man of War	Won	
2012	Amanda Award	Best Male Lead	Himself for Headhunters	Nominated	
2013	Canon Prize	Best Male Lead	Himself for Pioneer	Nominated	
2014	Amanda Award	Best Male Actor	Himself for Pioneer	Won	
2016	Elle	Norway's Most Sexy Man 2016	Himself	Won	
2017	Gullruten	Best Actor, TV Drama	Himself for Nobel	Nominated	
