= Troubled Water =

2008 Norwegian film

- International theatrical poster
- Directed by: Erik Poppe
- Written by: Harald Rosenløw Eeg
- Produced by: Finn Gjerdrum; Stein B. Kvae
- Starring: Pål Sverre Valheim Hagen; Ellen Dorrit Petersen; Anneke von der Lippe; Tone Danielsen; Trine Dyrholm; Trond Espen Seim; Terje Strømdahl; Frank Kjosås; Stig Henrik Hoff
- Cinematography: John Christian Rosenlund
- Edited by: Einar Egeland
- Music by: Johan Söderqvist
- Production company: Paradox Spillefilm
- Release date: 26 September 2008
- Running time: 121 minutes
- Country: Norway
- Language: Norwegian
- Box office: $100,794

Troubled Water (Norwegian: De usynlige, "The Invisible") is a 2008 Norwegian film directed by Erik Poppe.

The film depicts a large part of the story twice, from the perspectives of two people.

== Plot ==
As a teenager, Jan Thomas Hansen (Pål Sverre Valheim Hagen) and a friend run off with young boy Isak in a stroller left outside a cafe by the mother. The boy runs away, slips, and falls on a rock, suffering an apparently fatal head injury. Pressured by his friend, Jan Thomas, afraid of the consequences, carries the boy into a nearby river with a strong current, where he sets him adrift. Jan Thomas testifies that the boy was killed by the fall, but he is convicted of murder. While in jail, he plays the organ for church services.

As a young adult, he is released from prison and works as an organ player at a church. He befriends Anna (Ellen Dorrit Petersen), the priest of the church and a single mother, and her young son Jens. Agnes (Trine Dyrholm), Isak's mother, sees that Jan Thomas has been released and is concerned for the safety of her two adopted daughters. Her panicking reaction causes strain in her relationship with the two girls, as well as with her husband. Meanwhile, her husband accepts a job offer that will move their family to Denmark, in the hopes of easing Agnes' anxiety.

Agnes sees Jan Thomas together with Jens, and is also concerned that Jens may not be safe. When Jan Thomas lets Jens wait a few minutes outside Jens' school while Jan Thomas picks something up in the school, he returns to find Jens missing. Jan Thomas is very concerned when Jens is missing. Scared by ensuing events, Jens flees into the river and almost drowns. With great danger for himself, Jan Thomas catches him and holds on to a branch, after which Agnes, in a surprise twist of plot, helps them reach the shore. Jan Thomas confesses to Agnes what really happened earlier to her son Isak.

The movie was released in the USA by filmmovement.com.

== Reception ==
Troubled Water won the audience prize for best narrative feature film at the Hamptons International Film Festival in October 2008.
