= The Chieftain (film) =

1984 Norwegian drama film

- Directed by: Terje Kristiansen
- Starring: Terje Kristiansen
- Cinematography: Paul René Roestad
- Release date: 27 July 1984
- Running time: 120 minutes
- Country: Norway
- Language: Norwegian

The Chieftain (Norwegian: Høvdingen) is a 1984 Norwegian drama film directed by Terje Kristiansen. The film was selected as the Norwegian entry for the Best Foreign Language Film at the 57th Academy Awards, but was not accepted as a nominee.

== Cast ==
- Terje Kristiansen as Arne Strømberg
- Vibeke Løkkeberg as Eva
- Tonje Kleivdal Kristiansen as Turid
- Eva von Hanno as Toril
- Klaus Hagerup as Tom
- Arne Hestenes as Sjefen
- Sverre Anker Ousdal as Harald Ås
- Sigbjørn Bernhoft Osa as Bestefar

== See also ==
- List of submissions to the 57th Academy Awards for Best Foreign Language Film
- List of Norwegian submissions for the Academy Award for Best Foreign Language Film
