= Out Stealing Horses (film) =

2019 film by Hans Petter Moland

- Film poster
- Directed by: Hans Petter Moland
- Written by: Hans Petter Moland
- Based on: Out Stealing Horses by Per Petterson
- Produced by: Turid Øversveen; Håkon Øverås
- Starring: Stellan Skarsgård
- Cinematography: Thomas Hardmeier, Rasmus Videbæk
- Edited by: Jens Christian Fodstad, Nicolaj Monberg
- Music by: Kaspar Kaae
- Distributed by: TrustNordisk
- Release dates: 9 February 2019 (Berlin); 8 March 2019 (Norway)
- Running time: 122 minutes
- Countries: Norway; Sweden; Denmark
- Language: Norwegian

Out Stealing Horses (Norwegian: Ut og stjæle hester) is a 2019 Norwegian drama film directed by Hans Petter Moland. It was selected to compete for the Golden Bear at the 69th Berlin International Film Festival. At Berlin, the film won the Silver Bear for Outstanding Artistic Contribution. It was selected as the Norwegian entry for the Best International Feature Film at the 92nd Academy Awards, but was not nominated.

== Plot ==
In 1999, 67-year-old widower Trond Sander moves to a remote cabin in the area close to where he grew up in Eastern Norway. He intends to live isolated, but soon becomes acquainted with his neighbor, Lars. Trond slowly realizes that he remembers Lars from his childhood because he is the younger brother of Jon, his best friend from that time.

Because of Lars, Trond begins to recall and reflect on his youth during the Nazi-occupation of Norway through a series of flashbacks.

He particularly remembers how he and Jon would go out and "steal horses", which actually meant that they rode local horses bareback without permission. He also remembers how Lars accidentally killed his own twin brother after playing around with a rifle Jon had left loaded after a hunting trip. Trond is also confronted with bad memories about how his own father, who he later learned took part in the Norwegian resistance movement, abandoned him together with Jon's mother during the war.

== Cast ==
- Stellan Skarsgård. - Trond. Jon Ranes plays the young Trond
- Tobias Santelmann - Trond's father
- Danica Curcic - Jon's mother
- Pål Sverre Hagen - Jon's father
- Sjur Vatne Brean - Jon

== Production ==
The film was shot in rural Norway, in Trysil Municipality, and also in Lithuania's nature parks and the cities of Kaunas and Vilnius.

== See also ==
- List of submissions to the 92nd Academy Awards for Best International Feature Film
- List of Norwegian submissions for the Academy Award for Best International Feature Film
