= John Christian Rosenlund =

Norwegian cinematographer

- Born: 26 July 1964 (age 61)
- Occupation: Cinematographer
- Website: Official website

John Christian Rosenlund (born 26 July 1964) is a Norwegian cinematographer. Through 25 years, he has been a cinematographer for about 25 feature films, several television series and about 700 to 800 commercials.

Rosenlund received positive reviews on his work from the Hollywood Reporter and the Variety magazine for his work of cinematography in The King's Choice.

== Filmography ==
- Stella Days (2011)
- A Thousand Times Good Night (2013)
- The Wave (2015)
- The Saboteurs (2015) (TV Series)
- The King's Choice (2016)
- Askeladden - I Dovregubbens Hall (2017)
- The Middle Man (2021)
- Paradise Highway (2022)

== Awards and honors ==
In 2006, Rosenlund was awarded with the Aamot Statue organized by Film & Kino.
