= The Angel (2009 film) =

2009 film

- Directed by: Margreth Olin
- Written by: Margreth Olin
- Produced by: Thomas Robsahm
- Starring: Lena Endre
- Cinematography: Kim Hiorthøy
- Edited by: Helge Billing
- Release date: 2 October 2009
- Running time: 84 minutes
- Country: Norway
- Language: Norwegian

The Angel (Norwegian: Engelen) is a 2009 Norwegian drama film directed by Margreth Olin. The film was selected as the Norwegian entry for the Best Foreign Language Film at the 83rd Academy Awards but it didn't make the final shortlist.

== Cast ==
- Maria Bonnevie
- Börje Ahlstedt
- Antti Reini
- Lena Endre
- Gunilla Röör
- Benjamin Helstad

== See also ==
- List of submissions to the 83rd Academy Awards for Best Foreign Language Film
- List of Norwegian submissions for the Academy Award for Best Foreign Language Film
