= Brit Elisabeth Haagensli =

Norwegian actress and singer

Brit Elisabeth Haagensli (born 24 August 1953) is a Norwegian actress and singer, known from theatre and revue productions, television and several films.

Haagensli grew up in Asker. Since 1981, she has used the most of her summers to do theatre productions, and many of these on the summer revue in Stavern. Haagensli is probably most known for her role in Fredrikssons fabrikk, where she appeared with, among others, Elsa Lystad, Anne Marie Ottersen and the late Aud Schønemann.

She provided the voice of Goldie in the Norwegian dub of Rock-a-Doodle.

Her role in the film Absolutt blåmandag (1999) earned her the Amanda Award. She was awarded the Leonard Statuette in 2003.
