= Herman (film) =

1990 film

- Directed by: Erik Gustavson
- Written by: Erik Gustavson
- Starring: Anders Danielsen Lie
- Release date: 19 August 1990
- Running time: 88 minutes
- Country: Norway
- Language: Norwegian

Herman is a 1990 Norwegian drama film directed by Erik Gustavson. The film was selected as the Norwegian entry for the Best Foreign Language Film at the 63rd Academy Awards, but was not accepted as a nominee.

== Cast ==
- Anders Danielsen Lie as Herman
- Frank Robert as Grandfather
- Elisabeth Sand as Mother
- Kai Remlov as Jacobsen Jr.
- Sossen Krohg as Fru Jacobsen
- Harald Heide-Steen Jr. as Tjukken
- Bjørn Floberg as Father
- Jarl Kulle as Panten

== See also ==
- List of submissions to the 63rd Academy Awards for Best Foreign Language Film
- List of Norwegian submissions for the Academy Award for Best Foreign Language Film
