= The Prompter =

- Directed by: Hilde Heier
- Release date: 1999
- Country: Norway

The Prompter (Norwegian: Suffløsen) is a 1999 Norwegian film directed by Hilde Heier. It was Norway's official Best Foreign Language Film submission at the 72nd Academy Awards, but did not manage to receive a nomination.
