= Eggs (film) =

- Directed by: Bent Hamer
- Written by: Bent Hamer
- Produced by: Finn Gjerdrum
- Starring: Sverre Hansen
- Cinematography: Erik Poppe
- Release date: 26 May 1995
- Running time: 86 minutes
- Country: Norway
- Language: Norwegian

Eggs is a 1995 Norwegian comedy film by Bent Hamer. It was awarded the 1995 Amanda for Best Norwegian film. It was also entered into the 19th Moscow International Film Festival.

== Plot ==
Two old brothers, Moe and Pa, have lived together for their whole life and are content with their daily and weekly routine. This is disturbed later by the arrival of Pa's grown-up and disabled son Konrad, whose existence (due to a two-day trip of Pa to Småland, the only time Pa and Moe were separated) was unknown to Moe. The weirdness of Konrad and the jealousy of Moe and Konrad then disturb the routine, and Moe leaves home in the end.

== Cast ==
- Sverre Hansen as Moe
- Kjell Stormoen as Pa
- Leif Andrée as Konrad
- Juni Dahr as Cylindia Volund
- Ulf Wengård as Vernon
- Trond Høvik as Blomdal
- Alf Conrad Olsen as Jim
- Leif Malmberg as Priest
