= Sons of Norway (film) =

- Directed by: Jens Lien
- Starring: Sven Nordin; Åsmund Høeg; Sonja Richter
- Release date: 21 August 2011
- Running time: 87 minutes
- Country: Norway
- Language: Norwegian

Sons of Norway is a 2011 Norwegian drama film directed by Jens Lien.
