= Zero Kelvin (film) =

- Directed by: Hans Petter Moland
- Written by: Lars Bill Lundholm
- Produced by: Esben Høilund Carlsen
- Starring: Stellan Skarsgård; Bjørn Sundquist; Gard B. Eidsvold; Camilla Martens
- Cinematography: Philip Øgaard
- Edited by: Einar Egeland
- Music by: Terje Rypdal
- Release date: September 29, 1995
- Running time: 118 minutes
- Country: Norway
- Language: Norwegian
- Box office: $2.5 million

Zero Kelvin (Norwegian: Kjærlighetens kjøtere) is a 1995 Norwegian psychological thriller film directed by Hans Petter Moland and starring Gard B. Eidsvold and Stellan Skarsgård. It explores the tensions between three men in an isolated Greenland trapping station in the 1920s.

== Plot ==
In 1920s Oslo, Henrik Larsen, an aspiring poet, leaves his girlfriend Gertrude to spend a year as a trapper in Greenland. There he shares a small winter hut with the station master Randbæk and a scientist named Holm. Randbaek mocks Larsen's poetry, violin playing, and kindness to the sled dogs. Larsen soon proves himself superior at several tasks, but this only angers Randbaek further. He discovers a letter from Gertrude rejecting Larsen's marriage proposal and taunts Larsen that she is unfaithful.

Concerned with their dwindling supplies, Randbaek and Holm agree to kill one of the dogs over Larsen's objections. To spite Larsen, Randbaek deliberately wounds the dog rather than kill it. Randbaek and Larsen fight, and Holm attacks Randbaek to stop him from murdering Larsen. To make amends, Randbaek surprises Larsen with a Christmas feast, but when the two again argue about the dogs, Randbaek angrily destroys the decorations. Disgusted with both men, Holm renounces his friendship with Randbaek and departs the station alone by sled.

A few days later, Randbaek drunkenly knocks over a lantern, burning down the cabin. Now without shelter, the pair try to travel by sled dog to another settlement. When Randbaek refuses to share the work and whips Larsen's face, Larsen throws him from the sled, and they exchange gunfire. After Larsen finds Holm's sled crashed into a ravine, however, he lets Randbaek overtake him, and they agree to work together to survive.

Larsen attempts to cross the ice of a fjord despite Randbaek's warning and plunges into the water. The dogs pull him free and he finds shelter in the prow of a wrecked ship, where he loses consciousness. He wakes to find Randbaek has saved his life by building a fire. Shortly after, when Randbaek begins brutally beating Larsen's favorite dog to death for food, Larsen shoots him repeatedly. As he dies, Randbaek confesses that he had once murdered a lover of his wife, and for him, the murder was "the end of love"; he predicts Larsen will now become like him.

Safely returned to Oslo, Larsen claims that Randbaek died in the fire and is reunited with Gertrude, who now agrees to marry him. As she prepares to shave him, he begins to weep.

== Cast ==
- Stellan Skarsgård as Randbæk
- Gard B. Eidsvold as Henrik Larsen
- Bjørn Sundquist as Jakob Holm
- Camilla Martens as Gertrude
- Paul-Ottar Haga as Officer
- Johannes Joner as Company Man
- Erik Øksnes as Captain
- Lars Andreas Larssen as Judge
- Juni Dahr as Woman in park
- Johan Rabaeus as Man in park
- Frank Iversen as Poetry Buyer
- Tinkas Qorfiq as Jane

== Production ==
The film's Greenland scenes were shot in Svalbard, Norway.
