= Absolute Hangover =

1999 Norwegian comedy film

- Directed by: Petter Næss
- Written by: Axel Hellstenius
- Starring: Ingar Helge Gimle; Brit Elisabeth Haagensli; Per Christian Ellefsen; Gard B. Eidsvold; Anette Hoff; Kari Simonsen
- Release date: 29 January 1999
- Running time: 82 minutes
- Country: Norway
- Language: Norwegian

Absolute Hangover (Norwegian: Absolutt blåmandag) is a 1999 Norwegian comedy film directed by Petter Næss, starring Ingar Helge Gimle and Brit Elisabeth Haagensli.

== Plot ==
John and Siri Lill are around forty and have been together for most of their lives, without getting married. When John's drinking gets out of hand, Siri Lill decides to move back with her parents. John goes on a drunken binge, and just as the apartment is in a terrible mess, Siri Lill decides to return. Things to badly.
