= Limbo (2010 film) =

2010 Norwegian drama film

- Norwegian theatrical poster
- Directed by: Maria Sødahl
- Written by: Maria Sødahl
- Produced by: Gudny Hummelvoll; Petter J. Borgli
- Starring: Line Verndal; Bryan Brown; Lena Endre; Henrik Rafaelsen; Iben Iuel Hersoug; Fredrik Frafjord
- Cinematography: Manuel Alberto Claro
- Edited by: Jens Christian Fodstad
- Music by: Johan Söderqvist
- Release date: 10 September 2010
- Running time: 107 minutes
- Country: Norway
- Language: Norwegian

Limbo is a Norwegian drama film, written and directed by Maria Sødahl.

The movie takes place in the 1970s and depicts a so-called expatriate-group at Trinidad, associated with the oil industry.

== Plot ==
Set in 1973, the film portrays the lives of an expatriate community in Trinidad connected to the oil industry. The protagonist, Sonia, travels from Norway to Trinidad with her children to join her husband, Jo, who is stationed there for work. The transition from 1970s daily life in Norway to being an "oil wife" on a tropical Caribbean island is both exciting and demanding. When Sonia discovers that Jo has been unfaithful, she initially attempts to maintain appearances. However, with a crumbling marriage and no one to turn to, she soon struggles to cope with her new reality.
