= Berit Nesheim =

Norwegian filmmaker

- Occupation: Film director, director
- Awards: The Amanda Committee's Honorary Award (Amandaprisen 2024, 2024)

Berit Nesheim (born 28 January 1945) is a Norwegian film director. Nesheim graduated from the University of Oslo in foreign languages, literature and psychology to go on to a career as a director of television films. Her first feature-film was Frida – Straight from the Heart in 1991, which was the Norwegian entry to the Academy Award for Best Foreign Language Film in 1992. Her next feature film was Beyond the Sky (1994, starring with Swedish actress Harriet Anderson. Her film The Other Side of Sunday was nominated to Academy Award for Best Foreign Language Film in 1997. She directed the miniseries An Immortal Man (2006) on Henrik Ibsen's life.
