= Betrayed (2020 film) =

- Directed by: Eirik Svensson
- Written by: Lars Gudmestad; Harald Rosenløw-Eeg
- Based on: The Ultimate Crime (2014) by Marte Michelet
- Produced by: Therese Bøhn; Catrin Gundersen; Martin Sundland
- Starring: Jakob Oftebro; Pia Halvorsen; Michalis Koutsogiannakis; Kristine Kujath Thorp
- Cinematography: Karl Erik Brøndbo
- Edited by: Christian Siebenherz; Elise Solberg
- Music by: Johan Söderqvist
- Distributed by: Samuel Goldwyn Films
- Release dates: December 25, 2020 (Norway); December 3, 2021 (United States)
- Running time: 126 minutes
- Country: Norway
- Language: Norwegian

Betrayed (Norwegian: Den største forbrytelsen) is a 2020 Norwegian drama film based on the true story of the Norwegian boxer Charles Braude and his family being persecuted, arrested and murdered by the Nazis during World War II with the collaboration of the Quisling regime as part of their operation to exterminate all Jews in Europe, from the restrictions that began to be imposed on Norwegian Jews to their deportation via the port of Oslo on the ship SS Donau to the Auschwitz death camp. The film features key participants in the mass murder of Norwegian Jewry, such as Knut Rød, a senior police officer who collaborated in identifying, arresting and transporting Jews.

The film was directed by Eirik Svensson and is based on the 2014 book The Ultimate Crime by Norwegian journalist Marte Michelet.

== Background ==
The film is based on the lives of a Norwegian boxer, Charles Samuel Braude (23 May 1915 – 5 August 1991), his family and the Jews in Norway. During World War II, he was incarcerated in the Berg concentration camp outside Tønsberg because he was Jewish. His parents and two brothers were deported and killed in Auschwitz. On November 26, 1942, hundreds of Jews - 302 men, 188 women and 42 children - were picked up in the middle of the night and loaded onto the German ship SS Donau. The final destination was Auschwitz.

== Plot ==
During World War II, millions of Jews from all over Europe were deported and killed in German concentration camps. Initially, Jews living in Norway still feel safe and secure in their own country. One of them was Charles Braude, a young boxer, enjoying a happy life, just married to a gentile and living in Oslo with his parents, two brothers and sister.

When Germany invades Norway, the sister flees to Sweden but the others refuse to go. One day in the fall of 1942, all Jewish men over the age of 15 were picked up by the Norwegian police and taken to a dock in Oslo. Charles, his brothers and his father are also arrested. The mother is left alone, not knowing what will happen to her husband and sons. When the German cargo ship SS Donau arrives, the local police implement an ominous plan.

== Cast ==
- Jakob Oftebro as Charles Braude
- Pia Halvorsen as Sarah Braude
- Kristine Kujath Thorp as Ragnhild Boyesen
- Michalis Koutsogiannakis as Benzel Braude
- Carl Martin Eggesbø as Harry Braude
- Eilif Hartwig as Isak Braude

== Production ==
The screenplay was written by Harald Rosenløw Eeg and Lars Gudmestad. The film was directed by Eirik Svensson. The film's music was composed by Johan Söderqvist. The soundtrack album with a total of 21 music tracks was released as a download by MovieScore Media in December 2021.

The film was released in Norwegian cinemas on December 25, 2020, in Germany on October 21, 2021, and in the United States with English subtitles on December 3, 2021, and has since been available as video-on-demand.

== Reception ==
According to Rotten Tomatoes, as of July 2023, the film has received a 100% approval rating from film critics and 100% from the audience.
