= The King's Choice =

2016 film directed by Erik Poppe

- Film poster
- Directed by: Erik Poppe
- Written by: Harald Rosenløw-Eeg; Jan Trygve Røyneland
- Produced by: Finn Gjerdrum; Stein B. Kvae
- Starring: Jesper Christensen; Anders Baasmo Christiansen; Tuva Novotny; Katharina Schüttler; Karl Markovics; Juliane Köhler; Rolf Kristian Larsen; Erik Hivju
- Cinematography: John Christian Rosenlund
- Edited by: Einar Egeland
- Music by: Johan Söderqvist
- Distributed by: Nordisk Filmdistribusjon
- Release date: 23 September 2016
- Running time: 133 minutes
- Countries: Norway; Sweden; Denmark; Ireland
- Languages: Norwegian; Danish; German; Swedish
- Budget: $7.5 million
- Box office: $9.1 million

The King's Choice (Norwegian: Kongens nei, meaning "The King's No") is a 2016 biographical war film directed by Erik Poppe. It is a co-production of Norway, Sweden, Denmark, and Ireland, and was selected as the Norwegian entry for the Best Foreign Language Film at the 89th Academy Awards. The film made the shortlist of nine films to be considered for a nomination at the 89th Academy Awards.

== Plot ==
The film focuses on King Haakon VII and the Norwegian royal family in the days before and immediately after the German invasion of Norway in April 1940.

On 8 April, Crown Prince Olav informs his father that the transport ship that was sunk off Lillesand earlier that day was carrying German soldiers, and expresses concern that the government of Prime Minister Johan Nygaardsvold refuses to give up Norway's neutrality in the face of German aggression. At the German embassy in Oslo, German envoy Curt Bräuer is instructed by military attaché Lieutenant-Colonel Hartwig Pohlman to encourage the Norwegian government to allow German troops into the country, under the pretext of defending Norway from a British invasion. Early the following morning, Bräuer takes the German offer to Foreign Minister Halvdan Koht; after consulting the Cabinet, Koht refuses, stating that Norway is a sovereign nation.

Meanwhile, at Oscarsborg Fortress near Drøbak, Colonel Birger Eriksen prepares his undermanned and inexperienced garrison for combat, while receiving reports from the outlying fortresses of incoming German ships. Early on the morning of 9 April, Eriksen spots the German cruiser Blücher entering Drøbak Sound. Despite having received no instructions from Oslo to engage, Eriksen considers the German ship to be hostile and gives the order to fire, and the fortress's guns and torpedo battery sink the Blücher. Prime Minister Nygaardsvold telephones the King, informing him of the impending invasion, and advises him to flee Oslo. The royal family boards a train for Hamar, where the Norwegian Parliament convenes to discuss negotiations with Germany. Bräuer meets Oslo's police chief Kristian Welhaven, his intermediary with the Norwegian Cabinet, to reassure them of his desire to negotiate; at the same time, Pohlman receives orders from Berlin to send paratroopers to Hamar to capture the King and the Cabinet. Nasjonal Samling leader Vidkun Quisling proclaims himself Prime Minister over the national radio, and calls upon the Norwegian people to accept the German occupation forces. Bräuer receives instructions from Hitler himself to go directly to the King and convince him to recognise Quisling's government, though Bräuer is convinced that neither Haakon nor the Cabinet will accept this.

As German troops advance towards Hamar, the royal family and the Cabinet relocate to Elverum, where the decision is made to send Olav's wife and three children to Sweden while the King and the Crown Prince remain in the country. Just after midnight on 10 April, the German paratroopers attack a roadblock at Midtskogen, and are beaten back by the Norwegian volunteers. At Nybergsund, the Cabinet meets to discuss Bräuer's request to meet the King alone to end the hostilities. Despite Olav's objections and fears for his father's safety, Haakon agrees to meet with Bräuer at Elverum. Bräuer urges Haakon to follow the example of his elder brother, King Christian of Denmark, to capitulate without further resistance. Haakon relays the German demands to the Cabinet and states he cannot accept Quisling as Prime Minister, offering to abdicate if the Cabinet felt otherwise. Inspired by the King's decision, the Cabinet informs Bräuer of their refusal. In response, German aircraft bomb Elverum and Nybergsund, forcing Haakon and the Cabinet to flee into the woods.

The King, the Crown Prince, and the Cabinet eventually escape to Britain, where they remain until the end of the war. In May 1945, following the German surrender, Haakon is reunited with his grandson, Prince Harald, in London before the royal family returns to Norway.

== Cast ==
- Jesper Christensen as King Haakon VII
- Anders Baasmo Christiansen as Crown Prince Olav
- Tuva Novotny as Crown Princess Märtha
- Katharina Schüttler as Anneliese Bräuer
- Karl Markovics as Curt Bräuer
- Juliane Köhler as Diana Müller
- Erik Hivju as Colonel Birger Eriksen
- Espen Sandvik as Captain Magnus P. Sødem
- Arthur Hakalahti as Guardsman Fredrik Seeberg
- Rolf Kristian Larsen as Sergeant Brynjar Hammer
- Svein Tindberg as Peder Anker Wedel Jarlsberg
- Gerald Pettersen as Prime Minister Johan Nygaardsvold
- Ketil Høegh as Foreign Minister Halvdan Koht
- Andreas Lust as Oberstleutnant Hartwig Pohlman
- Jan Frostad as President of the Storting C. J. Hambro
- Magnus Ketil Dobbe as Prince Harald
- Sofie Falkgård as Princess Ragnhild
- Ingrid Ross Raftemo as Princess Astrid
- Udo Schenk as Adolf Hitler (voice)
- Torfinn Nag as Police Chief Kristian Welhaven
- Jan Petter Dickman as Ivar Lykke

== Release ==
The film was first shown to the whole of the present Norwegian royal family at the Royal Palace in Oslo on 16 September 2016.

== Reception ==
On Rotten Tomatoes, the film has an approval rating of 83% based on reviews from 24 critics, and an average rating of 6.6/10. On Metacritic, the film has a score of 64 out of 100, based on reviews from 8 critics, indicating "generally favorable reviews".

== See also ==
- List of submissions to the 89th Academy Awards for Best Foreign Language Film
- List of Norwegian submissions for the Academy Award for Best Foreign Language Film

=== Historic background ===
- Sinking of the troopship off Lillesand
- Battle of Drøbak Sound
- Battle of Midtskogen
- Elverum Authorization
- Bombardment of Nybergsund
- Timeline of the Norwegian Campaign
