= A Somewhat Gentle Man =

2010 film

- Norwegian theatrical release poster
- Directed by: Hans Petter Moland
- Written by: Kim Fupz Aakeson
- Produced by: Finn Gjerdrum; Stein B. Kvae; Erik Poppe
- Starring: Stellan Skarsgård
- Cinematography: Philip Øgaard
- Edited by: Jens Christian Fodstad
- Music by: Halfdan E
- Release dates: 15 February 2010 (Berlinale); 19 March 2010 (Norway)
- Running time: 113 minutes
- Country: Norway
- Language: Norwegian

A Somewhat Gentle Man (Norwegian: En ganske snill mann and also known as Regnskap) is a 2010 Norwegian crime comedy film directed by Hans Petter Moland. It premiered on 19 March 2010, and was the sixth feature-film directed by Hans Petter Moland. It was nominated for the Golden Bear at the 60th Berlin International Film Festival.

Moland said that the film "A Somewhat Gentle Man is about grown-ups struggling to keep up with the times. It's a black comedy about burning out with dignity, even for criminals".

During opening weekend in Norway, 16,000 people saw A Somewhat Gentle Man in theaters. The film received the Norwegian 'Film Critic Award' in 2011.

== Plot ==
After serving twelve years in prison for shooting and killing his wife's lover, Ulrik is released and attempts to establish a new life. His former criminal associate Jensen arranges a room for him with Jensen's sister, Karen Margarethe, and employment as a mechanic in Sven's repair shop. Jensen also informs Ulrik that they have located Kenny, the brother of the murdered man, whose testimony helped send Ulrik to prison, and expects Ulrik to kill him in revenge. Although Jensen obtains a gun for him and repeatedly pressures him to settle the score, Ulrik initially refuses, saying, “I won't do it.” Meanwhile, he reconnects with his former wife Wenche and contacts their estranged son, Geir, who has told his pregnant wife Silje that his father is dead and initially introduces Ulrik to her as his uncle. At work, Ulrik becomes close to Sven's daughter Merete, who is divorced from her abusive former husband Kristian and has a restraining order against him. When Ulrik later finds Kristian assaulting Merete, he severely injures him and warns him never to return. Ulrik and Merete subsequently begin a relationship, while Ulrik tells Karen Margarethe that he has met someone else.

Ulrik's attempts to rebuild his life then deteriorate. Geir tells Silje the truth about Ulrik, including that he served twelve years for murder, and tells his father that Silje does not want their child to have a grandfather “who shoots people.” Sven also dismisses Ulrik after discovering that he has become involved with Merete despite having been told to stay away from her. Ulrik consequently returns to Jensen and agrees to settle the score with Kenny. Following Jensen's detailed preparations, Ulrik goes to Kenny's home with the gun, but instead of killing him, he confronts him about the twelve years he spent in prison. Kenny explains that he testified because Ulrik had murdered his brother and reveals that he has been making regular payments intended for Ulrik's family. Ulrik leaves Kenny alive. He then goes to see Geir, but finds only the heavily pregnant Silje, who initially refuses to let him in. As Ulrik prepares to leave, her water breaks. He attempts to drive her to hospital in Jensen's Mercedes, but the baby is born in the car with Ulrik assisting her. Geir subsequently returns and reconciles with his father, while Silje acknowledges Ulrik as the child's grandfather.

Ulrik later returns to Jensen and admits that he did not kill Kenny. During the confrontation, he learns that Kenny had actually been paying Jensen 2,000 a month for Ulrik's family, while Jensen passed on only 1,500 and kept the difference. Jensen becomes furious about Ulrik's refusal to kill Kenny and about the blood left in his Mercedes following the birth, listing everything he believes he has done for Ulrik and calling him ungrateful. Ulrik tells Jensen to be still and shoots him. He places Jensen's body in the trunk of the Mercedes, takes the vehicle to the repair shop and has it crushed with Jensen's body inside. Afterwards, Ulrik tells Merete that he became a grandfather the previous night. In the film's final exchange, he tells her, “It's coming.” When she asks what he means, Ulrik answers, “Spring.”

== Cast ==
- Stellan Skarsgård as Ulrik
- Bjørn Floberg as Rune Jensen
- Gard B. Eidsvold as Rolf
- Jorunn Kjellsby as Karen Margrethe
- Bjørn Sundquist as Sven
- Jon Øigarden as Kristian
- Kjersti Holmen as Wenche
- Jan Gunnar Røise as Geir
- Julia Bache-Wiig as Silje
- Aksel Hennie as Samí
- Henrik Mestad as Kenny
- Jannike Kruse as Merete
- Ane H. Røvik Wahlen as Kenny's wife
