= Ninjababy =

Norwegian dramedy film

- Official film poster
- Directed by: Yngvild Sve Flikke
- Screenplay by: Johan Fasting
- Based on: Fallteknikk by Inga H Sætre
- Produced by: Yngve Sæther
- Starring: Kristine Thorp; Arthur Berning; Nader Khademi
- Production company: Motlys
- Distributed by: Arthaus (Norway); Tri-Art (Sweden); Øst for Paradis (Denmark)
- Release dates: January 18, 2021 (TIFF); May 21, 2021 (Norway)
- Running time: 104 minutes
- Country: Norway
- Language: Norwegian

Ninjababy is a 2021 Norwegian comedy-drama film directed by Yngvild Sve Flikke from a screenplay written by Johan Fasting, based on Inga H Sætre's graphic novel Fallteknikk. The film stars Kristine Thorp, Arthur Berning and Nader Khademi.

The film had its worldwide premiere at the 2021 Tromsø International Film Festival on January 18, 2021 and had its international premiere at the 71st Berlin International Film Festival in the "Generation 14plus" section.

== Plot ==
A baby has lodged itself unnoticed in her stomach, and if there's one thing that Rakel knows: She doesn't want it. The life-hungry young woman has a blooming imagination and spends time illustrating her everyday life. Hence, the Ninjababy appears as a comic figure which accompanies Rakel through the madness that is called growing up.

— Berlin International Film Festival

== Cast ==
- Kristine Thorp as Rakel
- Arthur Berning
- Nader Khademi

== Reception ==
On the review aggregator website Rotten Tomatoes, 100% of 39 critics' reviews are positive, with an average rating of 7.9/10.
