= Juni Dahr =

Norwegian actress

Juni Vibeke Dahr (born 29 June 1953) is a Norwegian actress. She was born in Oslo, and is the sister of film director and producer Eva Dahr.
