= Utøya: July 22 =

2018 film

Utøya: July 22 U – July 22
- Theatrical release poster
- Norwegian: Utøya 22. juli
- Directed by: Erik Poppe
- Written by: Siv Rajendram Eliassen; Anna Bache-Wiig
- Produced by: Finn Gjerdrum; Stein B. Kvae
- Starring: Andrea Berntzen; Aleksander Holmen; Brede Fristad; Elli Rhiannon Müller Osbourne; Solveig Koløen Birkeland; Magnus Moen
- Cinematography: Martin Otterbeck
- Edited by: Einar Egeland
- Music by: Wolfgang Plagge
- Production company: Paradox Film 7
- Distributed by: Nordisk Film (Norway)
- Release dates: 19 February 2018 (Berlinale); 9 March 2018 (Norway)
- Running time: 90 minutes
- Country: Norway
- Language: Norwegian
- Box office: $3.6 million

Utøya: July 22 (Norwegian: Utøya 22. juli), also known as U – July 22 (the title used at the 2018 Berlinale), is a 2018 Norwegian drama film directed by Erik Poppe and written by Anna Bache-Wiig and Siv Rajendram Eliassen. It is based on the Utøya summer camp massacre that took place on 22 July 2011, but the characters are fictional.

The purpose of Utøya: July 22 is to promote understanding of the victims by showing the massacre from their perspective. The film was created in close dialogue with over 40 survivors, to get the action as close to reality as possible. Most of the film consists of a single take, shot in real time, and follows the character Kaja from the third-person perspective before and throughout the 72-minute attack. The perpetrator Anders Behring Breivik is a figure in the periphery throughout the film, and is only briefly seen two times.

== Plot ==
Kaja is attending a Labour Party summer camp on Utøya with her younger sister Emilie. On 22 July, participants receive news that a bomb has exploded in the Government quarter in Oslo, but they believe they are safe as long as they are on an island, away from the city. Soon, gunshots are heard, and the campers quickly disperse as it becomes clear that it is not a drill.

At first, most campers attempt to hide in the camp's main building while loudly crying and screaming, but then they run away to the nearby forest. While hiding behind trees, Kaja and her friends call 112, and the police claim to be on the way. The others agree to run for the water so they can swim to safety, but Kaja runs back towards the camp to look for Emilie. Kaja finds a boy named Tobias, whom she convinces to run into the forest. When Kaja is unable to find Emilie in their tent, she runs back into the forest to find her.

Kaja comes across a young girl who has been shot and is trying to call her mother on the phone, and she tries to comfort her. Smoke grenades fill the forest, and the girl dies just as her mother calls her back. Kaja finds Magnus, a new camper she had met earlier in the day, with two other campers along the shoreline of the island. Magnus tries to defuse the situation and tell jokes to brighten the mood, but the other two do not take it lightly. Later, they see a large number of campers running in the lake, and the other two campers abandon Kaja and Magnus. Kaja and Magnus discuss what they want to be when they grow up; Kaja wants to be Norway's prime minister, and Magnus an actor.

After a close encounter with the shooter, Kaja goes out to find her sister again. Once on the beach, she discovers bodies scattered along the shoreline, including that of Tobias. As Magnus catches up to her, Kaja breaks down. A small boat is seen in the distance, and Magnus tries to convince Kaja to go with him, but she gets shot by the terrorist and falls to the ground. She cries out for Magnus and gets shot again, this time fatally. The perspective then switches to that of Magnus, as he runs for and reaches the boat with other survivors. As the boat sails away from the island, Magnus tearfully breaks down. It is revealed Emilie is also on the boat and is trying to help a seriously injured person. The screen turns to black.

We hear the boat reaching land, and the cries and screams of the survivors. A text-based epilogue then lists the number of casualties, and describes the terrorist's motivations. It ends with a warning that the far right is on the rise, and that there is growing support for the terrorist's political beliefs and enemy image.

== Cast ==
- Andrea Berntzen as Kaja
- Aleksander Holmen as Magnus
- Brede Fristad as Petter
- Elli Rhiannon Müller Osbourne as Emilie
- Solveig Koløen Birkeland as an injured girl
- Magnus Moen as Tobias
- Jenny Svennevig as Oda
- Ingeborg Enes Kjevik as Kristine
- Sorosh Sadat as Issa
- Ada Eide as Caroline
- Mariann Gjerdsbakk as Silje
- Daniel Sang Tran as Even
- Torkel Dommersnes Soldal as Herman
- Karoline Schau as Sigrid
- Tamanna Agnihotri as Halima

== Reception ==
The critical reception of Utøya: July 22 was mostly positive. On the review aggregator Rotten Tomatoes, it has an 83% approval rating and an average score of 7.1/10, based on 48 reviews from critics. The site's critical consensus reads: "Utøya: July 22 probes a nation's lingering shock and grief with a drama that grapples with difficult themes to deeply - and appropriately - unsettling effect."

The film was selected to compete for the Golden Bear in the main competition section at the 68th Berlin International Film Festival. Utøya: July 22 received eight nominations for the 2018 Amanda Awards during the Norwegian International Film Festival in Haugesund, winning for Best Actress (Andrea Berntzen) and Best Actress in a Supporting Role (Solveig Koløen Birkeland). At the 2018 European Film Awards in Seville, Martin Otterbeck won the award for Best Cinematographer for his work on Utøya: July 22.

== See also ==
- Arbeidernes Ungdomsfylking
- 2011 Norway attacks
- Gjørv Report
- List of films shot in real time
- Other media based on the attack:
  - 22 July (film), a 2018 US drama film directed by Paul Greengrass
  - Seconds From Disaster season 6: "Norway Massacre: I Was There" (airdate July 22, 2012)
