= A Thousand Times Good Night =

- Directed by: Erik Poppe
- Written by: Harald Rosenløw Eeg
- Produced by: Finn Gjerdrum; Stein B Kvae
- Starring: Juliette Binoche; Nikolaj Coster-Waldau; Lauryn Canny; Adrianne Cramer Curtis; Maria Doyle Kennedy; Larry Mullen Jr; Mads Ousdal
- Cinematography: John Christian Rosenlund
- Edited by: Sofia Lindgren
- Music by: Armand Amar
- Production company: Paradox Production
- Distributed by: Nordisk Film Distribution
- Release date: August 31, 2013 (Montreal World Film Festival)
- Running time: 117 minutes
- Countries: Ireland; Norway
- Language: English
- Budget: $8.5 million
- Box office: $53,895 (US)

A Thousand Times Good Night (Norwegian: Tusen ganger god natt) is a 2013 Irish-Norwegian English-language drama film directed by Erik Poppe and starring Juliette Binoche, Nikolaj Coster-Waldau, Maria Doyle Kennedy, Larry Mullen Jr. and Mads Ousdal.

== Plot ==
Rebecca is a photo journalist obsessed with reporting in dangerous war zones. Documenting a group of female suicide bombers in Afghanistan, she accompanies one of them to Kabul, where the premature detonation of the bomb severely injures her.

While recuperating at her home in Ireland, Rebecca is confronted by her husband Marcus and her daughter Steph, who force her to choose between covering war zones, or her family. She chooses her family.

Steph is intrigued by her mother's photographs and interested in humanitarian work in Africa, so Rebecca proposes a photography trip with her daughter to a refugee camp in Kenya. Marcus agrees, assuming that the trip will be safe.

Instead, the camp is attacked by an armed group that begins murdering people in their tents. Rebecca sends her daughter to safety but stays in the camp to document the attack.

Upon their return, Steph and Rebecca don't tell her father, but he finds out. He angrily throws Rebecca out and doesn't allow her to see the girls. Just before getting on a plane for Kabul, Rebecca gets a voicemail reminder from Steph about her presentation at school on their trip. With it, she lets her mother know she understands the importance of her work.

Rebecca does not board the plane and goes to the presentation. That night, Rebecca is allowed to tuck the girls in. The next day, she's again in Kabul, documenting the outfitting of another suicide bomber; this time a young girl. It affects her much more than the previous time. She breaks down and the camera fades to black.

== Production ==
Autobiographical elements in the film come from Poppe's work as a photojournalist in the 1980s, covering conflicts in Central America, the Middle East, Africa, and Southeast Asia. Most of the film was shot in Ireland and Morocco. Funding was provided by the Irish Film Board and Norsk Filminstitutt.

The film was produced by Finn Gjerdrum and Stein Kvae, while John Christian Rosenlund was the lead photographer. Several war-zone still images by photographers Marcus Bleasdale and Astrid Sehl, play an important role in the film.

== Critical reception ==
The Hollywood Reporter called the film an "affecting drama made more poignant by honest-feeling autobiographical elements" and praised Binoche's "complex performance" as "deserving particular attention." Variety called the film a "gripping tale of a dedicated photojournalist torn between passionate involvement with her work and commitment to her worried family." The magazine went on to say, "Deftly sidestepping both melodrama and family-values messaging, Poppe imbues the film with enormous emotional resonance, brilliantly grounded by his leading lady...."

The Montreal Gazette criticized the film, writing that it was "hobbled by a rather scattershot script" that spouts "platitudes about journalistic duty and media complacency in the face of war," and that the film "engages in some very conventional family melodrama."

== Awards ==
The film won the Special Grand Prix of the jury at the 2013 Montreal World Film Festival.
