= Erik Gustavson =

Norwegian film director and producer (born 1955)

- Spouse(s): Elisabeth Sand
- Children: Maria Sand

Erik Gustavson is a Norwegian film director and producer. He started out as a camera assistant and eventually moved on to cameraman before starting to work as a director in 1981.

He has directed seven feature films, including Herman, The Telegraphist (an adaptation of Knut Hamsun's novel Dreamers), and Sophieʼs World, all three of which enjoyed multi market theatrical release. The Telegraphist was entered into the 43rd Berlin International Film Festival.

In addition to his feature films, Gustavson has directed and produced approximately four hundred commercials world-wide for a variety of international markets.

Gustavson has published articles and produced documentaries about the craft of filmmaking, and occasionally taught the subject abroad.

Among the international awards that Gustavson has received are: Seven nominations for the Amanda Award, and three Amanda wins including Best Norwegian Short Film (1985), Best Norwegian Feature Film (1991), and Best Nordic Feature Film (1993); Two Golden Pencil Awards for Best Norwegian Commercial, one Gold Award for Best Nordic Director; and three Eurobest Awards in different categories for commercials. In 2019 first prize for best VR fictional the Aesthetica festival in UK with the 12 minute scripted volumetric-capture VR drama " Virtual viking - the ambush"

Since 2002 Gustavson has been based in Norway and in Italy

Present: Founding partner and creative director in the media company 21 Media SRL in Rome, as well as for : www.nativenorway.com in Norway Founding partner and creative director of www.thevikingplanet.com. Sole owner of media company Robin Hund AS
