= Hans Petter Moland =

Norwegian film director (born 1955)

Hans Petter Moland (born 17 October 1955) is a Norwegian film director.

== Career ==
Moland was born in Oslo. He had received awards for his commercials at major festivals, including Cannes, before he made his feature debut in 1993 with The Last Lieutenant. He followed up with Zero Kelvin (1995), Aberdeen (2000) and The Beautiful Country (2004), which was selected for Competition in Berlin. He also directed the short film United We Stand, which has been awarded prizes at several major film festivals. He is also well known for his collaboration and deep friendship with Swedish actor Stellan Skarsgård, having directed him in three movies; Zero Kelvin, Aberdeen and En ganske snill mann (2010), the latter being nominated for the Golden Bear at the 60th Berlin International Film Festival.

A fourth collaboration with Skarsgård, In Order of Disappearance, had its premiere in the competition section of the 64th Berlin International Film Festival. Moland made his Hollywood debut in 2019 directing a remake of In Order of Disappearance, named Cold Pursuit, and starring Liam Neeson in the Skarsgård role.

== Personal life ==
Moland is married to film director and screenwriter Maria Sødahl, with whom he has three children. He has also three children from a previous marriage.

== Filmography ==
Year	Title	Notes
1993	The Last Lieutenant	
1995	Zero Kelvin	
2000	Aberdeen	
2002	Folk flest bor i Kina	Segment: "De beste går først"
2004	The Beautiful Country	
2006	Comrade Pedersen	
2010	A Somewhat Gentle Man	
2014	In Order of Disappearance	
2016	A Conspiracy of Faith	
2019	Cold Pursuit	Remake of In Order of Disappearance
2019	Out Stealing Horses	
2024	Absolution	
2026	Growth of the Soil	
