= Erik Poppe =

Norwegian filmmaker (born 1960)

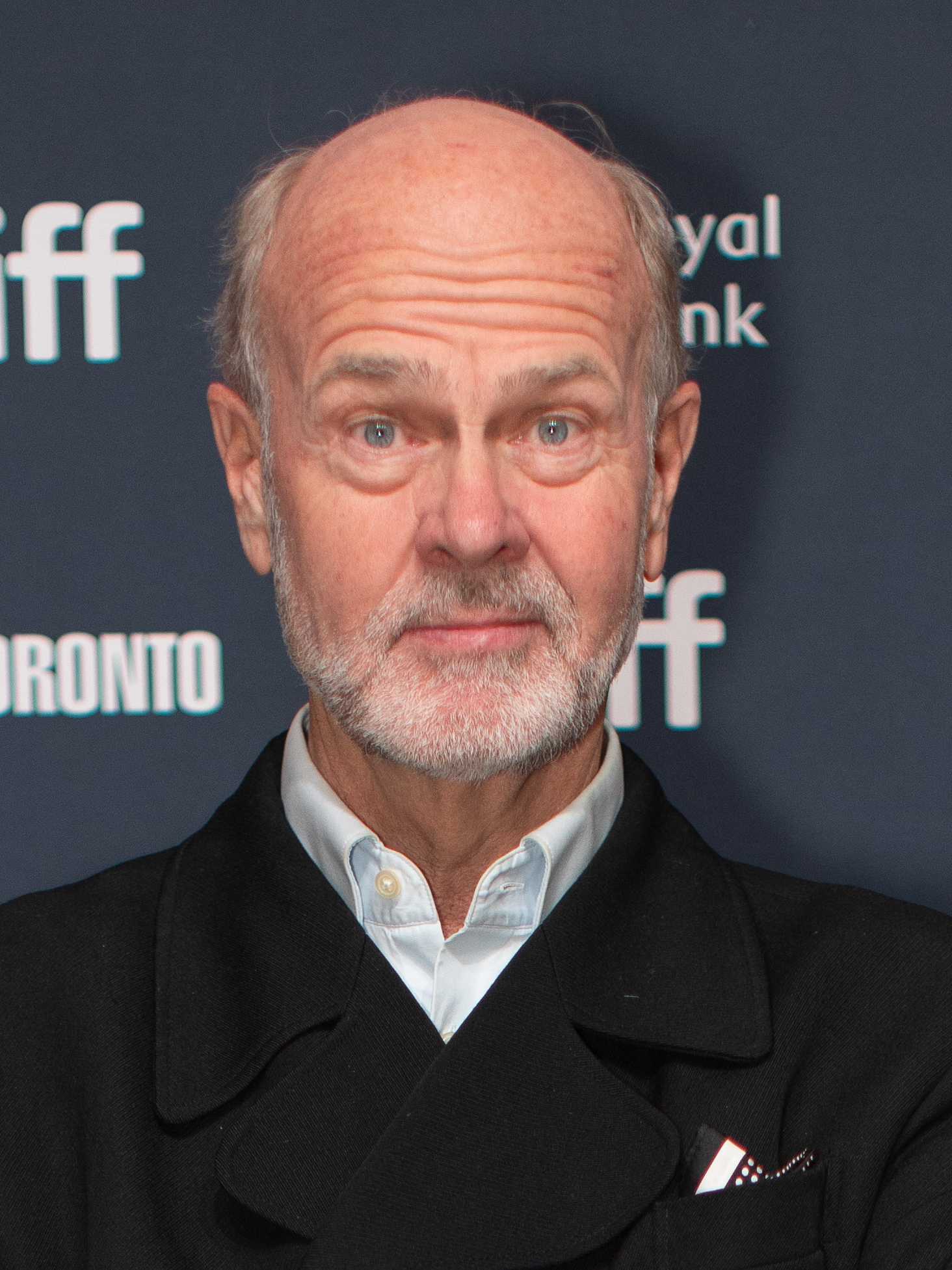
- Poppe in 2024
- Born: 24 June 1960 (age 66); Oslo, Norway
- Occupations: Film director, screenwriter, former cinematographer and press photographer
- Spouse: Kirsten Thorseth Poppe

Erik Poppe (born 24 June 1960) is a Norwegian film director, producer and screenwriter. He is best known for directing critically acclaimed films, including Hawaii, Oslo (2004), A Thousand Times Good Night (2013), The King's Choice (2016) and Utøya: July 22 (2018).

== Early life and education ==
Poppe was born on 24 June 1960 in Oslo to Aase and Per Frølich Poppe, who was a fashion designer in winter sport clothing. As a child, he grew up in Portugal and Norway.

He started his career as a photographer for the newspaper Verdens Gang and Reuters, covering domestic news as well as international conflicts. After being hospitalized after an assignment in Colombia, he decided to prepare leaving journalism and study filmmaking.

He graduated as a cinematographer at Dramatiska Institutet - University College of Film, Radio, Television and Theatre in Stockholm, Sweden in 1991. He conducted several artistic and directorial research programs between 2001 and 2010.

In 2015, Poppe concluded a PhD as a research fellow at the Norwegian Artistic Research Programme and as an Associated Professor at HIL, Lillehammer University College/ The Norwegian Film School.

The key artistic work made as part of the research was the feature movie A Thousand Times Good Night, a dramatization of his experiences as a conflict photographer in the Democratic Republic of the Congo and Afghanistan.

== Career ==
Poppe worked as Director of Photography on several features, including EGGS (1995) by Bent Hamer. He was awarded with the Kodak Award at the Moscow International Film Festival and won the Cinematographer of the Year award in Norway. After receiving the Kodak Award, Poppe announced his end of work as Director of Photography.

=== Oslo Trilogy ===
Troubled Water (2008, aka: deUSYNLIGE) is the third part of his multi-awarded Oslo Trilogy, after his directorial debut with SCHPAAA (1998, aka Bunch Of Five) and Hawaii, Oslo (2004). Both of these movies were shot in the area of Groenland and Grunerloekka in downtown Oslo.

Working on the research for Schpaaa, Poppe gained inspiration for two other films.

A Thousand Times Good Night (2013, aka: 1000 Times Good Night, Tusen Ganger God Natt) was Poppe's first English-language movie. The film is partly an autobiographical story based on Poppe's experiences as a conflict photographer. Poppe switched the lead roles around, making the French actress Juliette Binoche play as his cinematic proxy, and making Game of Throne's -Nicolaj Coster-Waldau play the character based on Poppe's wife. Montreal World Film Festival's world premiere of the film earned the Jury's Special Grand Prix.

The King's Choice (2016) is based on the story of the three dramatic days in April 1940, when Haakon VII of Norway is presented with the monstrous ultimatum from the Germans: surrender or die. With German Air Force and soldiers hunting them down, the royal family is forced to flee from the capital. After three days of desperately trying to evade the Germans, King Haakon makes his final decision, one that may cost him, his family and many Norwegians their lives.

The film made records when it opened in Norway by late September 2016 and became the #1 box office hit of the year. The film was Norway's official entry in the best foreign language film category for the 2017 Oscars and made a shortlist nomination for the Oscars.

Poppe's friend, Per Fugelli, was diagnosed with cancer in 2009 and died in 2017. This experience led Poppe to create I DIE (Siste resept), a film about life and how to live it to the very end.

In June 2017, it was announced that Poppe had worked for a year on developing a feature film about the 2011 terrorist attack on Utøya outside Oslo, Norway. The film, entitled U July 22 (Utøya 22.juli), is a fictional account of events, which tells the story from the young people's perspective, based on a series of in-depth interviews conducted with survivors from Utøya. Some of the interviews were on set behind the camera while filming took place to help give the narrative credibility.

Poppe was also the key director for Brigaden (The Brigade) in 2002, a 26 episode TV-drama for NRK (The Norwegian Broadcasting Corp). Brigaden received the Norwegian Amanda Prize for the Best TV Drama in 2003.

== Awards ==
Poppe is the only director to have received the Norwegian National Film Critics' Award for Best Feature for four films, Hawaii-Oslo in 2005, Troubled Water in 2009, A Thousand Times Good Night in 2014 and The King's Choice in 2017.

When Poppe received the Amanda Prize for Best Film in 2014, he became the first director to have all his feature films nominated for either Best Film or Best Director.

At the 2017 Amanda Awards, The King's Choice received a record 13 nominations and won 8 awards.

Poppe has participated in key events, such as the Berlin International Film Festival, where his film, Schpaaa, premiered in the Panorama section. Other events include:

- The Napoli International Film Festival, where Poppe received the Vesuvio prize.
- The Festroia International Film Festival, where Poppe received the Silver Dolphin and the award for Best Directing

Troubled Water made history at the Hamptons International Film Festival in 2008 by being the first film to win both the Golden Starfish for Best Narrative Feature and the Audience Award.

Poppe received the Special Golden Angel for his work as Outstanding European Film Artist at the 2016 International Film Festival TOFIFEST in Poland.

Erik Poppe is the co-owner of Paradox Film and the Paradox Group, a series of companies producing features.

== Filmography ==
- Schpaaa (1998)
- Brigaden (TV series 2002 about Norwegian firefighters)
- Hawaii, Oslo (2004)
- Troubled Water (2008)
- A Thousand Times Good Night (2013)
- The King's Choice (2016)
- I die. (Documentary about Professor Per Fugelli) (2017)
- Utøya: July 22 (2018)
- The Emigrants (2021)
- Quisling: The Final Days (2024)
- Beloved (2026)
