= Mikkel Bratt Silset =

Norwegian actor (born 1991)

- Born: 1991 (age 34–35); Oslo, Norway
- Education: Oslo National Academy of the Arts
- Occupation: Actor
- Years active: 2006–present
- Known for: Norsemen

Mikkel Bratt Silset (born 1991) is a Norwegian theatre, television, and film actor from Oslo best known to international audiences for his role in the Netflix series Norsemen.

== Life and career ==
Silset began acting as a child and had his first major role at the age of fourteen, in the 2006 feature film Sons. Two years later, he played the role of Georg in Eva Dahr's film adaptation of Jostein Gaarder's novel Appelsinpiken. As a student, he also had roles in the television series Lilyhammer, Dag, and the movie Beatles, based on the novel of the same name.

Silset studied acting at the Oslo National Academy of the Arts from 2012, graduating in 2015.

In 2016, he was cast in the role of Ragnar, the violent but fun-loving right-hand man of the soon-to-be chieftain Arvid, played by Nils Jørgen Kaalstad, in the Netflix series Norsemen, a parody of Viking life and customs. He kept the role for the duration of the show's three seasons, until March 2020.

In 2017, Silset played the role of Teo, a bank robber, in the NRK1 thriller-drama series Valkyrien. In 2018, he appeared in two episodes of the dramedy Unge lovende. In 2019, he acted in the HBO series Beforeigners as Nabo, the Stone-Age neighbour of lead protagonist Lars Haaland, played by Nicolai Cleve Broch. He also played a small part in the miniseries Hellums kro the same year.

== Selected filmography ==
=== Film ===
List of film appearances, with year, title, and role shown
| Year | Title | Role | Notes |
|---|---|---|---|
| 2006 | Sons | Tim | |
| 2009 | The Orange Girl | Georg | |
| 2014 | Beatles | Snowflakes | |
| 2018 | 22 July | Hønefoss police officer | |
| 2026 | Kraken | Erik | |

=== Television ===
List of television appearances, with year, title, and role shown
| Year | Title | Role | Notes |
|---|---|---|---|
| 2010 | Dag | Theo | 6 episodes |
| 2014 | Lilyhammer | Roger | 2 episodes |
| 2016–20 | Norsemen | Ragnar | 18 episodes |
| 2017 | Valkyrien | Teo | 8 episodes |
| 2018 | Unge lovende | Sebastian | 2 episodes |
| 2019 | Beforeigners | Neighbor | 4 episodes |
| 2019 | Hellums kro | Bully | 2 episodes |
| 2019 | Førstegangstjenesten | | 1 episode |
| 2020–23 | Basic Bitch | Røyketissen | 17 episodes |
| 2022 | Headhunters | Ove Kjikerud | 6 episodes |
