= Beforeigners =

Norwegian television series

- Genre: Crime drama; Sci-fi
- Created by: Anne Bjørnstad; Eilif Skodvin
- Written by: Anne Bjørnstad; Eilif Skodvin
- Directed by: Jens Lien
- Starring: Nicolai Cleve Broch; Krista Kosonen
- Country of origin: Norway
- Original languages: Norwegian; English (second season)
- No. of seasons: 2
- No. of episodes: 12

Production
- Producers: Terje Strømstad; Jan-Erik Gammleng
- Production locations: Norway; Lithuania
- Running time: 45 minutes
- Production company: Rubicon TV AS

Original release
- Network: HBO Nordic (season 1); HBO Max (season 2)
- Release: 21 August 2019–2021

Beforeigners is a Norwegian television series that premiered on 21 August 2019. The show was created and written by Eilif Skodvin and Anne Bjørnstad, and directed by Jens Lien. Produced by Rubicon TV AS for HBO Nordic, it is the first Norwegian-language series produced by the Nordic region channel of American network HBO.

The series concerns the titular "beforeigners", people from different time periods who suddenly appear in the present, and their integration into 21st-century Norway. The protagonists are Lars (Nicolai Cleve Broch), an Oslo police detective, and Alfhildr (Krista Kosonen), a Viking-era recruit, who investigate the murder of a Stone Ager. In September 2020, HBO confirmed that the series had been renewed for a second season. Season two premiered on HBO Max in Europe on 5 December 2021, and in the United States on 23 December 2021. In the second season, Alfhildr and Lars investigate Oslo murders with ties to Jack the Ripper.

== Premise ==
=== Season 1 ===
Beforeigners is set in Oslo, where people from the Stone Age, Viking Age, and the 19th century appear in Bjørvika bay. These migrants, called "Beforeigners", attempt to integrate into contemporary Norway. Senior detective Lars and Viking-era recruit Alfhildr investigate a Stone Age woman's murder. Alfhildr and fellow shield-maiden Urðr help their Viking commander, Thorir Hund. Lars' daughter, Ingrid, and her friend Maddie, fake a "time migration" for Russefeiring. Maddie returns older and with visions of the past. Maddie welcomes the arrival of Olaf the Stout.

=== Season 2 ===
Lars and Alfhildr investigate brutal murders with ties to Jack the Ripper. Two fake UK police consultants confirm the link to Ripper murders, though these are later denied by real London police. Ingrid is pregnant with Sturla's baby. A search is on for three women who "time-migrated" from Victorian-era London to Oslo. Magnus the Good's DNA confirms the identity of Olaf the Stout. A Viking-era völva reveals Alfhildr's importance to Olaf's reinstatement as King of Norway. Lars and Alfhildr pursue John Roberts, a theoretical physicist.

== Cast and characters ==
Sources:

- Nicolai Cleve Broch as Lars Haaland: Oslo police senior detective
- Krista Kosonen as Alfhildr Enginnsdóttir (patronymic literally: no one's daughter): former Viking shield-maiden, multi-temporal police recruit
- Tobias Santelmann as "Blond Viking" (Olaf the Stout)/Olav Haraldsson: Viking king of Norway, later canonized as St. Olav
- Ragnhild Gudbrandsen as Wenche: police detective, Lars' subordinate
- Stig R. Amdam as Harald Eriksen: police section leader, Lars' superior
- Stig Henrik Hoff as Tommy Henriksen/Thorir Hund: former Viking commander, delivery rider
- Kyrre Haugen Sydness as Gregers Nicolai Schweigaard: Marie's 19th-century husband
- Ylva Bjørkås Thedin as Ingrid Haaland: Lars and Marie's daughter
- Ingunn Beate Øyen as Chief of Police, Grete Skog: Harald's boss
- Mikkel Bratt Silset as Nabo (literally: neighbour) Kurukhés: Lars' neighbour
- Madeleine Malling Breen as Madeleine "Maddie" Aas: Ingrid's school friend
- Nader Khademi as Alex Pedersen: police detective, Lars' subordinate, undercover Norwegian intelligence agent
- Lavrans Haga as Jørn: police detective, Lars' subordinate
- Agnes Kittelsen as Marie Gran: Lars' ex-wife, married to Gregers
- Veslemøy Mørkrid as Othilia Winther: 19th-century journalist
- Pål Sverre Hagen as Doctorand: former scientist, neo-Luddite cult leader
- Øystein Røger as Oddvar: forensic pathologist
- Celin Ayara as Sofie: Maddie's school friend
- Tiril Gjesdal Clausen as Aisha: Maddie's school friend
- Aslak Maurstad as Preacher: 19th-century doomsayer

=== Season 1 cast ===
- Ágústa Eva Erlendsdóttir as Urðr Sighvatsdóttir: former Viking shield-maiden
- Oddgeir Thune as Navn Ukjent (literally: Name Unknown): Stone Age man
- Herbert Nordrum as HC (Holger Caspersen): 19th-century brothel owner
- Eili Harboe as Ada/Trine Syversen: former military drone specialist, neo-Luddite
- Jeppe Beck Laursen as Skjalg Egilsson: Viking skald
- Bhkie Male as Gedi Suleyman: security company director
- Odd-Magnus Williamson as Jeppe: harbour police
- Nils Jørgen Kaalstad as Kirketjener/Church Servant: Olaf adherent
- Jóhannes Haukur Jóhannesson as Kalv Torbjørnsson: Viking, Åsatru missionary
- Kristin Grue as Jeanette: Tommy/Thorir's modern-era wife

=== Season 2 cast ===
Sources:

- Hedda Stiernstedt as the völva: former Viking-era slave, later a witch and Old Norse spiritual leader
- Paul Kaye as John Roberts: theoretical quantum physicist, researched time-migration and 19th-century serial killer Jack the Ripper
- Billy Postlethwaite as Isaac Ben Joseph: Victorian-era Ripper hunter, follows Jack to modern Oslo, poses as English consultant, "Mr. Rubenstein"
- Jade Anouka as Adepero Abeke: Nigerian-born 19th-century time migrant, London-based neo-Luddite, poses as English police officer, "Precious Clark"
- Philip Rosch as Henry Black: Counter Terrorism Command (SO15) senior investigator
- Herman Flesvig as Sturla Arnesson: Viking-era TV weatherman, Olaf's friend
- Ann Akinjirin as Precious Clark: Scotland Yard homicide officer
- Sigrid Kandal Husjord as Odin: Lars' hallucination, appears as a small woman
- Marius Lien as Aslakr: Olaf's subordinate
- Per Kjerstad as Gegnir: Olaf's subordinate
- Hanne Skille Reitan as Sunniva: police psychiatrist
- Dagny Backer Johnsen as Sarah Murphy: 19th-century time-migrant, subway tunnel victim
- Eva Verpe as Emma Wilson: 19th-century time-migrant, Ekebergparken Sculpture Park victim
- Kristine Hartgen as Nessie Olssen/Olsen: 19th-century time-migrant, hotel victim

== Background and production ==
After creating the show Lilyhammer, Anne Bjørnstad and Eilif Skodvin decided to explore science fiction ideas. Skodvin suggested the core concept of "refugees arriving not from a different location but from different times". The story of Beforeigners was built around that concept, with two main characters, Lars and Alfhildr, chosen early on. The creators were inspired by shows such as True Love and District 9, and the story itself was influenced by The Leftovers and the sci-fi classics Brave New World and Nineteen Eighty-Four.

In July 2017, Rubicon TV received 250.000 kr from the Norwegian film and television incentive scheme to develop Beforeigners, and awarded 9.500.000 kr in April 2018 to produce the series.

Bjørnstad and Skodvin hired linguists for the actors. Julian Kirkeby Lysvik provided the Stone Agers' language, Alexander Kristoffersen Lykke translated Old Norwegian for Viking speech, and André Nilsson Dannevig tackled the 19th-century version of Norwegian. Finnish actress Krista Kosonen had to learn Norwegian and Old Norse for her role. Filming of season 1 took place in Oslo and Lithuania.

In February 2020, Rubicon TV was granted 22.300.000 kr in incentive scheme funding to produce a second season. Filming began in October 2020 but was delayed due to COVID-19 restrictions and shutdowns in Oslo. Bjørnstad and Skodvin returned as scriptwriters and Lien as director, with HBO Nordic replaced by HBO Max.

In January 2022, the Norwegian Film Institute announced that Rubicon TV had applied for funding from the Norwegian incentive scheme to produce a third season of the series.

=== Removal of series by HBO Max ===
In the first week of July 2022, HBO Max abruptly removed Beforeigners from its series lineup, along with all Nordic-region content, after the merger of WarnerMedia with Discovery. WarnerMedia owns HBO.

== Release ==
Beforeigners premiered in Europe on HBO Nordic and HBO Europe, and in the United States on HBO, on 21 August 2019.

The second season premiered in Europe on HBO Max on 5 December 2021, followed by the United States on 23 December 2021.

== Reception ==
Nina Metz of the Chicago Tribune gave the series three (out of four) stars and said it was "A sci-fi buddy cop series, the show pairs a grizzled detective [Broch] with an eager-to-impress Viking warrior [Kosonen]... Though structured as a crime drama, the show has a wonderfully dry sense of humor, and there's something intriguing in the idea of people from different eras jostled together, some adapting better than others. The metaphors relating to racism and xenophobia and a host of other bigotries are obvious." Pajiba's Dustin Rowles wrote, "It's a solid crime drama with a neat, high-concept premise, and some fantastic performances (again, especially that of Kosonen). If you have a few hours and love murder shows, time travel, commentary on immigration, and even a touch of Scandinavian history, Beforeigners is an addictive binge."

Tor Aavatsmark of Lyd & Billede found the show "focusing on the uniqueness and originality of the fact that a whole bunch of people from the Stone Age, Viking Age and 19th century suddenly find their way into today's Scandinavian welfare state – with all the challenges, cultural conflicts and overtly comic situations that this entails." But Aavatsmark felt that season 2 is "far less funny...and the comedy that remains rarely causes the laughter muscles to move. The fact that Olav the Holy in the present ends up as a narcissistic cocaine junkie seems more sought after than funny...production seems so cheap...[its] special effects are under criticism. Just look at the weird artificial filter laid over Oslo's skyline to make it look worn and dirty, or the bullet whizzing through the air in slow motion. It's on the edge of the amateurish." Mia Carlsen of Serienytt, on the other hand, found that "[it] gives the impression that the series holds on to its charming narrative style and is true to its characters. Everything and everyone seems to be the same as when the series left us...but with darker undertones than last time. Either way, it's good to be back in dystopian Oslo. At least we're ready for some answers." Carlsen praised the series creators, Bjørnstad and Skodvin, who have "put a lot of effort into creating a full-fledged experience of what is happening in Oslo and elsewhere in the world. I don't think we're ever going to fully understand or appreciate how amazing this is done, from language to costumes to food to norms to behavior and religions."

=== Awards and nominations ===
Beforeigners was nominated for Best Drama Series at the Gullruten 2020 awards, thus becoming the first HBO production to be nominated for this prize. At the Norwegian Series Critics Awards in September 2020, the series was nominated for Best Norwegian Drama, while Krista Kosonen received a nomination for Best Actress in a Norwegian Series.

== Episodes ==
| Series | Episodes | Originally released | | |
| Series | Episodes | First released | Last released | Network |
|---|---|---|---|---|
| 1 | 6 | 21 August 2019 | 25 September 2019 | HBO Nordic; HBO Europe; HBO (U.S.) |
| 2 | 6 | 5 December 2021; 23 December 2021 | 2 January 2022; 27 January 2022 | HBO Max (Europe); HBO Max (U.S.) |

=== Season 1 (2019) ===
| No. overall | No. in season | Title | Directed by | Written by | Original release date |
|---|---|---|---|---|---|
| 1 | 1 | "Episode 1" | Jens Lien | Eilif Skodvin, Anne Bjørnstad | 21 August 2019 |
Early 2000s: Lars goes to Bjørvika bay to supervise the recovery of "time migrants". They speak Old Norse, claiming to be from the past. Some years later: Norwegian society is significantly altered by continued new arrivals from earlier eras. Lars shares custody of his daughter, Ingrid. He examines an apparently drowned woman with Stone-Age tattoos and strange crosshatch markings across her back. Forensics determine she was asphyxiated. Lars leads the murder investigation; management pairs him with showpiece recruit Alfhildr, a "trans-temporal" Viking. They interview harbour police officers Jepp and David. Then, at the transit camp for recent arrivals, a Viking-Age woman describes a sea monster, Hafgufa. Lars illegally buys temproxate from a neighbour, Nabo. Ingrid wants to go Russefeiring but is blocked by Lars' ex-wife, Marie, and her new partner, Gregers, a man from the late-19th century. Lars pays her fare, however, subverting them. He notices that the description of Hafgufa loosely matches that of a fishing trawl net. These are being used by two men to capture women appearing in the water.
| 2 | 2 | "Episode 2" | Jens Lien | Eilif Skodvin, Anne Bjørnstad | 28 August 2019 |
1031 A.D. Finnmarksvidda: Shield-maiden Alfhildr arrives at a collection of huts, looking for her commander, Thorir Hund. A seer directs her to the "lake of a thousand lights". Present: Lars tells Alfhildr his trawl net idea. She suspects another practical joke, but investigates it regardless. Navn is visited by Gedi and Vend, two CroMagnon Security employees. He asks them about the murdered woman. He orders them to collect all captured women from brothels, where they had been sold. Alfhildr finds that CroMagnon ordered a trawl net. She re-encounters her fellow shield-maiden, Urðr. After partying at a Viking bar, the two follow a CroMagnon truck to a brothel. Alfhildr photographs Gedi and Vend. She then tells the squad about suspected trawling for women by CroMagnon, which is put under surveillance. Brothel manager, Holger, orders Navn to return his prostitutes but is attacked. Gedi and Vend are arrested for forced prostitution.
| 3 | 3 | "Episode 3" | Jens Lien | Eilif Skodvin, Anne Bjørnstad | 4 September 2019 |
Bicycle courier Tommy is greeted by the Viking Skjalg as his commander, Thorir. Lars and Alfhildr visit a trans-temporal centre to meet its director. Ada, an employee, copies the contents of their laptops while the two are distracted. Urðr is diagnosed with breast cancer but refuses treatment. Ingrid and Maddie find Lars' temproxate, and Maddie steals a bottle. Thorir does not recognise Urðr and Alfhildr, and does not remember Old Norse. Navn denies any connection to CroMagnon or Gedi and Vend. At a mediation with Marie, Lars and Ingrid successfully argue for her Russefeiring. Thorir is attacked by Olaf supporters but manages to fight them off. Navn is shot and killed by a drone while out hunting rabbits.
| 4 | 4 | "Episode 4" | Jens Lien | Eilif Skodvin, Anne Bjørnstad | 11 September 2019 |
Four girls on the Ben Dover boat attempt to fake time migration. Maddie, dressed as a Stone Ager, takes temproxate and the others follow. Maddie jumps in the water while being filmed by her friends. In a flash of light, Maddie disappears and reappears soon after amidst a number of Vikings. Ingrid jumps in to rescue her, while the other two girls phone for help. Lars and Alfhildr search for Navn's body. Lars learns Ingrid is at the transit camp: she and Maddie have been isolated due to contact with time migrants. Both have temproxate in their blood. Maddie has rotted, discoloured teeth and poor memory of recent events. Lars and Alfhildr discover that Ada was qualified to operate the military drone that killed Navn. Maddie is sent home, and begins fervently reciting the Lord's Prayer.
| 5 | 5 | "Episode 5" | Jens Lien | Eilif Skodvin, Anne Bjørnstad | 18 September 2019 |
Lars is visited by an Ásatrú missionary, Halv, who praises Odin. Wenche provokes Alfhildr in the car park. The latter then intentionally rear-ends Wenche's car, later claiming that her foot slipped. The television news reports that Tommy is in fact Thorir—the killer of King Olaf, who is revered for Christianising Norway. Thorir is fired from his job. He agrees to take part in a bare-knuckle boxing match against an Olaf supporter, Tobias. Urðr and Alfhildr cheer for Thorir. Maddie recalls little of her experience in the Viking era. Wenche informs Lars that they found temproxate in Alfhildr's car. He tells Harald, his supervisor, that the drug was his, and is suspended. Alfhildr and Jeppe, who have been seeing each other, have sex. Afterwards, while Alfhildr is asleep, he plucks a strand of hair from her head and puts it in a plastic bag.
| 6 | 6 | "Episode 6" | Jens Lien | Eilif Skodvin, Anne Bjørnstad | 25 September 2019 |
A new Viking arrival asks for a phone, and calls Maddie. Alfhildr grows suspicious of Jeppe, and while searching the text messages and photos they exchanged, finds bite marks on his skin. Oddvar checks the drowning victim's teeth for blood and matches it with Jeppe's sperm inside Alfhildr. Jeppe and David are arrested for the murder of the girl and for forced prostitution. Alfhildr is fêted for solving the case. Lars wants to investigate Maddie's "time anomalies" further. At Thorir's migration day celebration, Urðr notices an Olaf-supporter with a gun. She jumps in front of him and is fatally shot. Thorir then remembers that as a young girl, Alfhildr was rescued from the sea, wearing a life jacket. Maddie digs up a sword and crucifix from a ruined churchyard, and gives them to Olaf, who has arrived to meet her.

=== Season 2 (2021) ===
| No. overall | No. in season | Title | Directed by | Written by | Original release date |
|---|---|---|---|---|---|
| 7 | 1 | "Episode 1" | Jens Lien | Eilif Skodvin, Anne Bjørnstad, Harald Mæle jr. | 5 December 2021 |
Whitechapel, 1888: Isaac Ben Joseph hunts Jack the Ripper. Three local women flee to a ship for Norway. Present day: Alfhildr and Wenche examine a mutilated corpse found in a subway tunnel. It is a 19th-century time-migrant, Sarah Murphy. Lars, still suspended from the police force, is assigned as a consultant on the case. Alfhildr is experiencing sleepwalking episodes and tries to figure out what is causing them. Meanwhile, Olaf Haraldsson seeks to be recognized as the King of Norway. Senior officer Harald Eriksen contacts British police about a possible connection between the murder he is investigating and one bearing similar markings found in the UK. Two members of Scotland Yard are dispatched to Oslo. One of them is a time-migrating Isaac, who believes the murders have been committed by the Ripper.
| 8 | 2 | "Episode 2" | Jens Lien | Eilif Skodvin, Anne Bjørnstad, Harald Mæle Jr. | 5 December 2021 |
Olaf receives the skull of his son, Magnus, which was stolen from Nidaros Cathedral by his acolytes. Alfhildr sleepwalks to work in her underwear. Othilia Winther receives a letter that contains a bloody, severed body part, causing her to faint. Lars compares the writing in the letter to that of Jack the Ripper, and police forensics identify the body part as a dolphin clitoris. Meanwhile, Isaac and Adepero travel in secret to meet Doctorand, a neo-Luddite cult leader, and Lars figures out that the two are not in fact from Scotland Yard. Thorir Hund is framed for the theft of Magnus' skull. Ingrid comes clean to Lars and tells him she thinks she is pregnant. Together, they break the news to Marie and Gregers. Two actual UK police, Henry and Precious, dismiss any connection with Jack the Ripper and direct attention to Isaac, instead. Olaf and the völva meet in secret. Alex Pedersen sends the arrival files of three 19th-century women, Emma Wilson, Nessie Olssen, and Sarah Murphy (the subway tunnel victim), to Counterterrorism Command.
| 9 | 3 | "Episode 3" | Jens Lien | Anne Bjørnstad, Eilif Skodvin | 12 December 2021 |
The völva meets with Olaf and tells him that her prophecy relates to Alfhildr, not Maddie. In London, Precious and Henry provide Lars and Alfhildr evidence of Isaac's guilt. Ingrid decides to have an abortion, and Sturla threatens to kill her. Olaf's identity is proven after he undergoes a DNA test. Alfhildr, following a lead on the neo-Luddites, is placed in charge of a police operation that raids Doctorand's farm; Isaac is captured and his files on the missing women found. Alfhildr gets a brain scan to test for temporal sleep disorder (TSD). Thorir is released on bail. John Roberts is spotted at an underground station.
| 10 | 4 | "Episode 4" | Jens Lien | Anne Bjørnstad, Eilif Skodvin | 19 December 2021 |
John kills Rebekka, a soothsayer, and takes her phone. He uses it to lure another victim, Emma, into a trap. Lars and Alfhildr, without official authorization, question Isaac, who confirms that John is Jack the Ripper. For their breach, they are removed from the case and instead, they search for Rebekka. They also find the arrival file on three 19th-century women (Sarah, Emma, and Nessie). After learning that she has an enlarged hippocampus, Alfhildr begins to notice that her senses are enhanced. Lars assaults Sturla at the gym. In revenge, two Vikings attack Gregers at his house, mistaking him for Lars. The police track Rebekka's phone to a park, but they arrive too late, finding Emma dead.
| 11 | 5 | "Episode 5" | Jens Lien | Anne Bjørnstad, Eilif Skodvin | 26 December 2021 |
Alfhildr watches a video of John lecturing about time travel paradoxes. John goes to find Nessie, one of the three 19th-century women. In a confrontation, a preacher there to protect her is killed, and Nessie is abducted. Olaf dumps Maddie after she asks him about his use of cocaine. Ingrid changes her mind and decides to keep the child she is pregnant with. Lars and Alfhildr discover a British police plot, titled Project 19, to send agents back in time. John sets up a meeting with Henry on the pretext of saving Nessie's life. Olaf, together with the völva, drive to find Alfhildr, but their car is violently struck by a train. In a subway tunnel, John shoots and kills Henry. Alfhildr confronts him and demonstrates her newfound ability to dodge bullets. When both two-way time travellers make contact, an explosion occurs.
| 12 | 6 | "Episode 6" | Jens Lien | Anne Bjørnstad, Eilif Skodvin | 2 January 2022 |
Alfhildr and John's clash causes a time rift. Alfhildr arrives in an alternative reality, where Olaf and the völva are absolute monarchs. Alfhildr is employed as a cleaner at the police station, where her former colleagues do not recognise her. Alex uses his agency's technology to communicate with his alternative self and helps Alfhildr find Norse Faith adherents. She demands an audience with Queen Völva, who has her imprisoned. Fellow prisoners tell Alfhildr that Lars is a local shaman. She escapes and finds him, and he directs her to seek John. Alfhildr proceeds to close the time rift by killing the Englishman. Everything returns to normal, and Alfhildr wakes up in the hospital. Ingrid goes to have an ultrasound. While examining evidence from Olaf's car crash, Alfhildr finds her stolen crucifix pendant and has a flashback showing Ingrid giving it to her at four years of age. DNA analysis determines that Alfhildr is Lars' granddaughter.
