= Marian Saastad Ottesen =

Norwegian actress (born 1975)

- Born: Astrid Marian Saastad Ottesen; 24 November 1975 (age 49); Florø, Norway
- Occupation: Actress
- Years active: 2001–present
- Known for: Lilyhammer; Norsemen
- Spouse: Nils Jørgen Kaalstad

Astrid Marian Saastad Ottesen (born 24 November 1975) is a Norwegian actress who has been performing in theatre, television, and film since 2001. She is best known to international audiences from the Netflix series Lilyhammer and Norsemen.

== Life and career ==
Ottesen was born in Florø and grew up in Skien, where she attended theatre school. She graduated from the Norwegian National Academy of Theatre in 1999. Ottesen worked in several productions at Oslo Nye Teater, Centralteatret, as well as the National Theatre in Oslo, until 2006.

She has since appeared in a number of television productions and films, including Elsk meg i morgen (2005), Gone with the Woman (2007), Lilyhammer, and Norsemen.

== Personal life ==
In 2018, Ottesen married Norsemen co-star Nils Jørgen Kaalstad.

== Awards and recognition ==
- Amanda Prize 2006 for Elsk meg i morgen (nominated)
- Kanon Award 2007 for Gone with the Woman (won)
- Amanda Prize 2008 for Gone with the Woman (nominated)

== Selected filmography ==
=== Film ===
List of film appearances, with year, title, and role shown
Year	Title	Role	Notes
2000	Detector	Laila	
2005	Elsk meg i morgen	Lone	
2006	The Art of Negative Thinking	Marte	
2007	Gone with the Woman	Marianne	
2013	Her	Happy couple in restaurant	Uncredited

=== Television ===
List of television appearances, with year, title, and role shown
Year	Title	Role	Notes
2001	Nissene på låven	Anne-Gro Lamo	24 episodes
2011	Nissene over skog og hei	Anne-Gro Lamo	24 episodes
2012–14	Lilyhammer	Sigrid Haugli	21 episodes
2016–20	Norsemen	Hildur	18 episodes
2024	Stayer	Monica Elstad	2 seasons, 12 episodes
