= Nizamettin Ariç =

Kurdish singer, composer and director

Nizamettin Ariç (Kurdish: Nîzamettîn Arîç; born 1956 in Ağrı, Turkey) is a contemporary Kurdish singer, composer and director. He was exposed to traditional Kurdish bard music or dengbêj at an early age, but until 1980 was professionally active as a singer of Turkish-language folksongs, including songs that he himself had translated from Kurdish to Turkish. In 1976, he began performing for Ankara Radio. In 1979, at a concert in his hometown of Ağrı, he sang a love song in Kurdish, and was arrested for spreading propaganda. Upon finding he was to be sentenced to 5–15 years, he sought political asylum in Germany and has resided in Berlin since.

Even though he was unable to perform in Turkey, as music critic Orhan Kahyaoğlu notes, Nizamettin Ariç's recordings have been influential on musicians in Turkey, especially Kardeş Türküler (who has covered several of his songs), and film/TV music arranger Aytekin Gazi Ataş. His movie A Song for Beko was one of the first films in the Kurdish language and has won 15 international awards.

== Discography ==
=== Albums, Turkish language ===
Sources:

- Telli Sazım, Turkola, 1979
- Ben Yetim, Öncü Plak, 1980
- Telli Sazım / Dertli Ağrı, Aydın, 1986
- Hazal Gelin, Göksöy Plakçılık, 1986/1989
- Tut Elimden Düşmeyelim, Gema, precise year unknown (late 1990s)
- Bekesamın/Kimsesizim, Aydın, year unknown

=== Albums, Kurdish language ===
- Berivan, 1982
- Çem, 1982
- Dilan, 1983
- Diyarbekir, 1984
- Çiyayên Me, Ses Plak, 1985
- Cûdî, Ses Plak, 1986
- Dayê, Ses Plak, 1987
- Zînê, Ses Plak, 1988
- Kurdistan 1988, 1989
- Ahmedo Roni, 1991
- Wêneyên Xewnan (Images Dreams), Ses Plak, 1993
- Bê Kesa Min / Ahmedo Ronî, Aydın Müzik, 1996
- Kurdish Ballads 1, 2001
- Kurdish Ballads 2, 2002
- Azadi, Kalan Müzik Yapım, 2011
- Dertli Cemo, Harika Müzik, year unknown
- Rinda Min, Aydın, year unknown

== Filmography ==
=== As director ===
- Klamek ji bo Beko (A Song for Beko), 1992

=== As composer ===
- Dilan, dir. Erden Kiral, 1987
- Komitas, dir. Don Askarian, 1989
- Klamek ji bo Beko, 1992
- Dugun: Die Heirat, dir. Ismet Elçi, 1993
- De Jongen die niet meer praatte (The Boy Who Stopped Talking), dir. Ben Sombogaart, 1996
- Hoppet (The Jump), dir. Petter Næss, 2007
- 5 No'lu Cezaevi: 1980-84, documentary, dir. Çayan Demirel, 2009
- Ölücanlar, documentary, dir. Murat Özçelik, 2010
- A Long Night, short, dir. Kamiran Betasi, 2014
- Blister, short, dir. Morteza Shams, 2018

=== As actor ===
- Bir Günün Hikayesi (Story of a Day), 1980 (Nizam)
- Kurban Oldugum, 1982 (Halil)
- Klamek ji bo Beko, 1992 (Beko)
