= Nissene på låven =

Nordic Christmas calendar (television series)

- Genre: Comedy; Christmas calendar
- Created by: Espen Eckbo; Kristian Ødegård
- Written by: Espen Eckbo; Kristian Ødegård; Nikis Theophilakis
- Directed by: Espen Eckbo; Kristian Ødegård
- Composer: Jens Thoresen
- Country of origin: Norway
- Original language: Norwegian
- No. of seasons: 1
- No. of episodes: 24

Production
- Producer: Henrik Aase
- Cinematography: Cato Johansen; Kåre Sponberg
- Editors: Espen Eckbo; Kristian Ødegård; Terje Oegema; Einar Røyne
- Running time: 15 minutes (including commercials)
- Production company: Seefood TV

Original release
- Network: TVNorge
- Release: 1 December – 24 December 2001

Nissene på låven (English: Santas in the Barn) is a Nordic Christmas calendar that aired on TVNorge in 2001, and is a spoof of reality television.

A sequel, Nissene over skog og hei, aired in 2011.

== Plot ==
24 Santas are gathered in a barn to compete for the title of the best Santa. They are split into two teams, the grey beards (gråskjeggnissene) and the white beards (hvitskjeggnissene). Every day they compete in contests related to Christmas. The losing team has to meet in "låvetinget" ("the barn parliament") to vote out a member of their team. They're voted out one by one until the strongest Santa is left on Christmas Eve.

== Cast ==
Actor	Role(s)
Espen Eckbo	Asbjørn / Rhino
Trond Fausa Aurvåg	Steven
Eivind Sander	Tom
Nikis Theophilakis	Svein
Sverre Horge	Sverre
Siw Anita Andersen	Synne
Line Verndal	Kine
Frode Thorstad	Ole Morten
Rolf Arne Hesleskaug	Gaute
Harald Aas	Peter
Ole Enger Stenberg	Even
Jan Fredrik Wasa	Vegard
Henrik Elvestad	Timothy
Atle Antonsen	Bent
Marian Saastad Ottesen	Anne-Gro
Jannike Kruse	Marte
Jonas Torgersen	Johs
Bodil Lahelle	Bodil
Hilmar Lahelle	Hilmar
Einar Slyngstad	Einar
Zahid Ali	Radjif
Inger Gundersen	Liss
Mette Oreberg	Else
Geir Børresen	Maskenissen
Kristian Ødegård	Host

== Ratings ==
Nissene på låven had an average rating of 368,000 viewers.
