= Manité =

Photo agency based in Norway

Manité was an international photographic cooperative acted 1962 – 1967, owned by its photographer-members, Arild Kristo, Robert A. Robinson and Dan Young (photographer), with office in Oslo, Norway.
As a comment to the unsafe situation with uneven income that many photographers were in Manité was formed. They considered it was easier to build a position and trademark as a photographer by yourself. Manité was formed by model of Magnum Photos, founded by Henri Cartier-Bresson and Robert Capa. The images of Manité are characterized by an interest in human and social values, which is clearly evident in the Manité Group's many well-known art galleries and projects.
In 1998, the Museum of Contemporary Art presented an extensive exhibition, Manité 1962–1967, with photography and film from the group, published by Spartacus Forlag AS, and Museet for Samtidskunst in Oslo. (ISBN 978-8243001169)
