= Sverre Horge =

Norwegian actor (1944–2026)

- Born: May 10, 1944
- Died: October 25, 2026 (aged 82)

Sverre Horge (10 May 1944 – 25 October 2026) was a Norwegian actor. He acted in many Norwegian films and television shows. Horge is best known for playing the role of Sverre in the popular Norwegian Christmas series Nissene på Låven on TVNorge.

== Life and career ==
Horge was also a guest on many other popular television shows, such as Tonight med Timothy Dahle, Melonas, Seks som oss, and Senkveld med Thomas og Harald. When Håvard Lilleheie began The Man Show in 2006 Horge was one of the actors, both in the role of Emil's father, and the character of Rolf "Ni-seks" Hansen. In 2007, he played the main role in the animated film Janus, which won the Amanda Prize for best short film.

He acted in many Norwegian films from the 1970s. Horge often appeared alongside the duo Wam and Vennerød, and can be seen in films such as Det tause flertall, Hvem har bestemt? and Liv og død.

Horge died on 25 October 2026, at the age of 82.

== Filmography ==
- Uti vår hage 2 (2008) – Mann med røkeben
- Janus (short film) (2007) – Janus
- The Man Show: Det beste fra sesong 1 og 2 (2007)
- Seks som oss (2005) – Egils kollega
- Tonight med Timothy Dahle (2003) – Tore
- Nissene på Låven (2001) – Sverre Borge
- Elling (2001) – Mann på Valkyrien restaurant
- Blackout (1986) – Scenemester
- Liv og død (1980) – Gjengleder
- Nedtur (1980) – Uteliggeren
- Pøbel (1980) – Tom
- Hvem har bestemt? (1978) – Drosjesjåfør
- Det tause flertall (1977) – Kollega
- Ingen roser, takk – Sykehuspasient
- Eddie og Suzanne (1975) – Eddie
- The Terrorists (a.k.a. Ransom) (1974) – Undercover Policeman
- Voldtekt (1971) – Frank
