= Jens Lien =

Norwegian film director (born 1967)

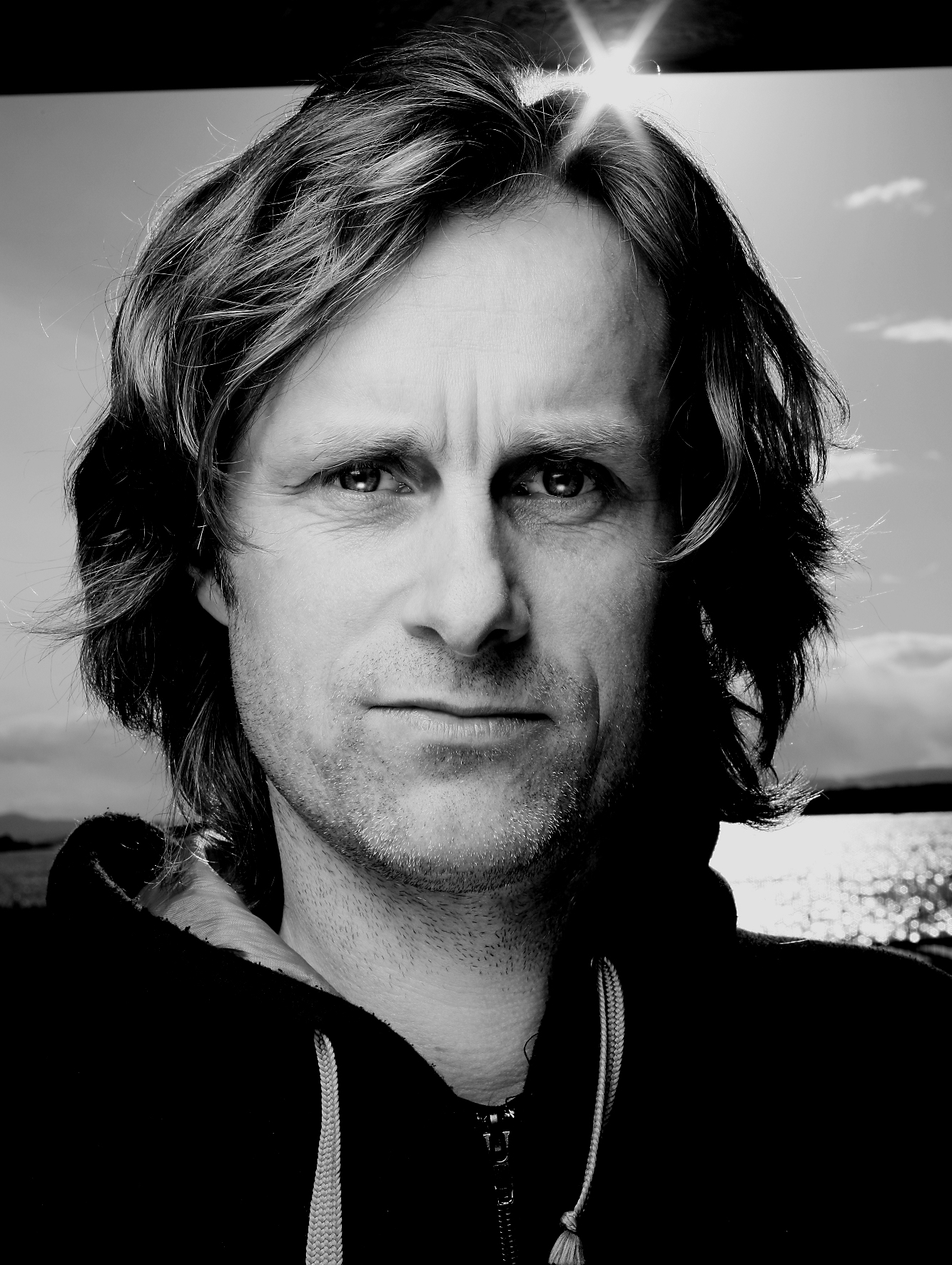
- Jens Lien in 2006
- Born: 14 September 1967 (age 58)
- Occupation: Director
- Years active: 1992–present
- Awards: Amanda Award, "Best Direction"; Den brysomme mannen (2006); ACID Award (Cannes), Den brysomme mannen (2006)

Jens Lien (born 14 September 1967) is a Norwegian film director. He graduated from the London International Film School in 1993.

His graduation project was the short film Montana, which was featured at the short film festival in Grimstad that year. In 1995 he again participated in this festival, with the entry Mitt elektriske kjøkken (My Electrical Kitchen).

Lien also made the short films Døren som ikke smakk (Shut the Door, 2000) and Naturlige Briller (Natural Glasses, 2001). Both of these films were based on screenplays by Per Schreiner. Each was featured in its year of release at the Cannes International Film Festival. In addition to these films, Lien has also made a number of advertisements.

In 2003 he made his feature film debut with Jonny Vang. The movie was selected for the Berlin Film Festival. The movie received an Amanda Award for "Best Actor" (Aksel Hennie) in 2003. It was also nominated in the category "Best Film", but lost to Bent Hamer's Salmer fra kjøkkenet.

Lien's next major film project was Den brysomme mannen (The Bothersome Man) (2006). This film was another collaboration with writer Per Schreiner. It was based on a story originally written for radio theatre. The radio production was recorded two years before it was adapted for the screen. Lien later said in an interview that the script made such a strong impression on him that he was unable to sleep after first reading it.

The film was awarded three Amandas in 2006: for "Best Direction", "Best Screenplay", and "Best Actor" (Trond Fausa Aurvåg). It was also nominated in the categories "Best Film" and "Best Actress" (Petronella Barker). Den brysomme mannen has won more than 20 international awards, including the ACID Award (Agence du Cinéma Indépendant pour sa Diffusion) at the Cannes Film Festival.

In 2011 his feature film Sønner av Norge (Sons of Norway) premiered at the Toronto Film Festival. The film features a cameo performance by John Lydon (aka Johnny Rotten). It premiered in Norway at the same time.

In 2014 Lien directed the mini series Viva hate for SVT (Swedish television). The series consisted of three 60-minute episodes. It was a romantic comedy about rock 'n' roll set in Gothenburg's vital music scene in the early 1990s.
