= Hoppet (film) =

2007 film directed by Petter Næss

- Swedish cover.
- Directed by: Petter Næss
- Written by: Moni Nilsson-Brännström; Kurt Öberg
- Produced by: Anders Bergh; Lotta Nilsson; Joachim Stridsberg
- Starring: Ali Abdulsalam; Ronas Gemici
- Cinematography: Marius Johansen Hansen
- Edited by: Inge-Lise Langfeldt
- Music by: Nizamettin Ariç; Nils Petter Molvær
- Release date: February 9, 2007
- Running time: 88 minutes
- Countries: Sweden; Norway; Germany
- Language: Swedish
- Box office: $27,963

Hoppet is a 2007 motion picture directed by Petter Næss.

== Plot ==
The Kurdish boys Azad and Tigris are brothers. Due to an airstrike Tigris cannot speak anymore. They are sent to an uncle in Germany, the parents plan to come soon afterwards. The boys travel through Sweden and are accompanied by another family until Sweden. They get stuck there and have to live with the family in Sweden.

Azad is good at high jumping and gets the opportunity to travel to Germany for a competition. However, he has no passport. Therefore, he borrows the passport of a Swedish friend, and changes his appearance to look like the picture: he puts in blue lenses and dyes his hair blonde. Tigris is smuggled into Germany in a suitcase. When he is about to be discovered by the border guard, the latter is distracted with conversation, and they can move on.

In Germany Azad wins the competition and is reunited with his parents.
