= Kristine Riis =

Norwegian actress and comedian

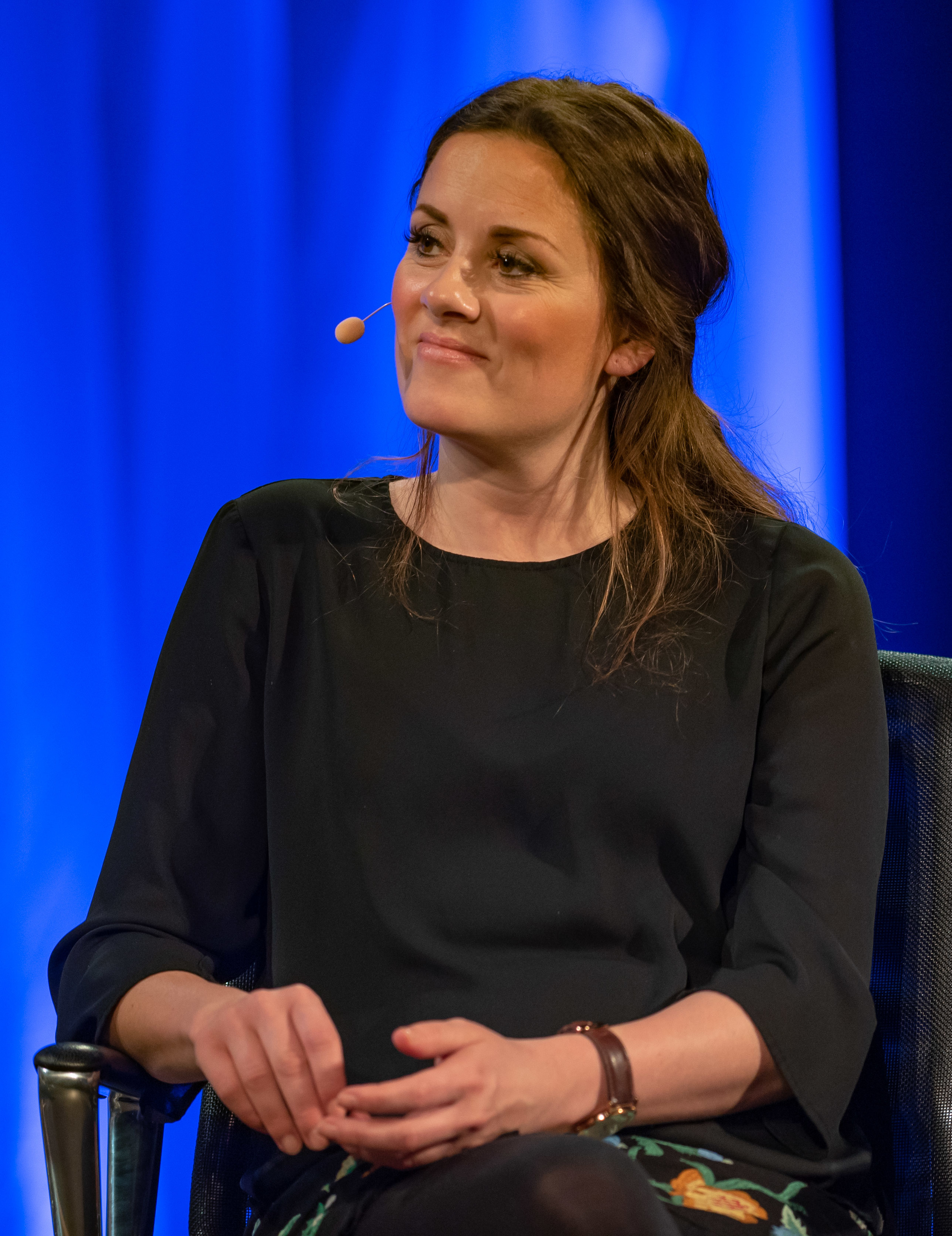
- Riis in 2018
- Born: 3 August 1982 (age 43); Norway
- Occupations: Actress; comedian
- Known for: Norsemen
- Partner: Jon Niklas Rønning (2017–2019)

Kristine Riis (born 3 August 1982) is a Norwegian actress and comedian. She is best known to international audiences for her role in the Netflix series Norsemen.

== Career ==
Together with Live Nelvik and Siri Kristiansen, Riis hosted the show Drillpikene on NRK P3 from 2007 until 2009. She was also a guest host on the SNL-like show Torsdag kveld fra Nydalen and played the role of Benedicte in the series Nissene over skog og hei. In 2012, she joined the cast of Løvebakken. She became a permanent member of the series Underholdningsavdelingen on NRK1 in the spring of 2015.

In 2016, Riis was cast in the role of Liv, an opportunistic former slave who becomes the soon-to-be chieftain's wife, in the Netflix series Norsemen, a parody of Viking life and customs. She remained in the role for the duration of the show's three seasons, until March 2020.

From 2017 until 2018, Riis hosted the talk show Lørdagsrådet, which had previously been hosted by Siri Kristiansen (2010–17) and is currently presented by Live Nelvik.

== Personal life ==
In 2017, Riis confirmed that she was dating comedian Jon Niklas Rønning. In May 2019, Riis gave birth to a son. The relationship ended in the autumn of 2019.

== Selected filmography ==
List of television appearances, with year, title, and role shown
Year	Title	Role	Notes
2007–09	Drillpikene	Herself	
2011	Nissene over skog og hei	Benedicte	24 episodes
2012/2016	Nytt på nytt	Herself	2 episodes
2015–16	Underholdningsavdelingen	Herself/various	20 episodes
2016–2020	Norsemen	Liv	18 episodes
2017–18	Lørdagsrådet	Herself	
