= Klamek ji bo Beko =

- Directed by: Nizamettin Arıç
- Written by: Nizamettin Arıç
- Produced by: Margarita Woskanjan Filmproduktion
- Starring: Nizamettin Arıç, Bezara Arsen
- Distributed by: Margarita Woskanjan
- Release date: 1992
- Running time: 100 minutes
- Language: Kurdish

Klamek ji bo Beko (A Song for Beko) is a 1992 film written and directed by Nizamettin Arıç, who is also among the cast. It is one of the first Kurdish films.

== Plot ==
The odyssey of a Kurdish man (Beko) in search of his brother, who has fled to avoid being drafted into the Turkish Armed Forces. Escaping arrest in Turkey, he flees to Syria and from there to Iraqi Kurdistan, where he finally finds refuge among displaced children. In Iraq, Beko manages to survive the Iraqi chemical attacks in 1988, and along with a blind girl, he makes it to Germany. Eventually, he discovers that his brother was drafted in the Army and killed in the conflict with Kurdish guerillas.

== Awards ==
- Special Jury and Audience Awards, Fribourg International Film Festival, 1994.
- Audience Award, São Paulo International Film Festival, 1993.
- Audience Award, Angers European First Film Festival, 1993.
