= Kraken (2026 film) =

2026 monster film by Pål Øie

- Theatrical release poster
- Directed by: Pål Øie
- Written by: Vilde Eide; Kjersti Helen Rasmussen; Natasha Arthur
- Story by: Pål Øie; Sjur Aarthun
- Produced by: John Einar Hagen; Einar Loftesnes; Vindhya Sagar
- Starring: Sara Khorami; Mikkel Bratt Silset; Ingvild Holthe Bygdnes; Øyvind Brandtzæg; Jenny Evensen
- Cinematography: Sjur Aarthun
- Edited by: Sjur Aarthun
- Music by: Roy Westad
- Production companies: Handmade films in Norwegian woods; Nordisk Film Production
- Distributed by: Gussi 4; Mediawan Rights; Samuel Goldwyn Films; Signature Entertainment; Splendid Film; Youplanet Pictures
- Release dates: January 23, 2026 (TIFF); May 1, 2026
- Running time: 100 minutes
- Country: Norway
- Language: Norwegian
- Budget: €5.3 million

Kraken is a 2026 Norwegian monster action horror film directed by Pål Øie, written by Vilde Eide, Kjersti Helen Rasmussen, and Natasha Arthur and from the story of Øie and Sjur Aarthun. The film stars Sara Khorami, Mikkel Bratt Silset, and Ingvild Holthe Bygdnes. It follows a marine biologist investigating strange deaths in a Norwegian fjord that may be linked to the legendary sea monster.

== Plot ==
After a video surfaces showing hundreds of salmon beaching themselves at a farming facility in the Sognefjord, food safety inspector Johanne is sent to investigate. The facility uses a system called Sonic Lice, invented by Johanne and her former lover Erik, to remove parasites from the salmon. Jostein, the owner of the farm, hopes to broker a lucrative deal with visiting Japanese investors.

Jostein's daughter Maria, who shot the initial video to sound the alarm about the ecological dangers of Sonic Lice, is excited by Johanne's return, believing she will be able to help shut the farm down. She is disappointed when Johanne tells her she's only there to file a report.

As several unexplained deaths occur in the fjord, Johanne and Erik discover strange creatures that appear to be much larger versions of the lice that plague the local salmon. They theorize that the giant lice must be parasites of an unknown but enormous marine creature.

Maria and her friends Cato and Hallvard decide to sabotage the Sonic Lice system. The creature attacks Cato while he is underwater, killing him and leaving fishery worker Georg unable to turn Sonic Lice off. The kraken causes the farm facility to dislodge from the land and drift into the fjord, trapping Johanne, Erik, Maria, Hallvard, Georg, and Jostein aboard. Hallvard and Georg are killed by the parasites, while Johanne and Maria are attacked by the kraken itself but mysteriously spared.

After the kraken kills Jostein, Maria's police officer mother Henriette reaches the drifting facility in her boat. Johanne and Erik devise a plan to use the remaining Sonic Lice systems as a bomb. Johanne plants the bomb in the water, but is grabbed by the kraken and pulled under. Accepting her fate, she looks the kraken in the eye as the bomb explodes, killing them both. Fisherman Olav retrieves Johanne's body, which a weeping Erik holds.

One year later, Maria sets sail to explore the ocean in a boat named after Johanne. During the credits, a gigantic egg is shown under the fjord, implying that the kraken was a mother protecting its offspring and explaining its reluctance to kill women.

== Cast ==
- Sara Khorami as Johanne
- Mikkel Bratt Silset as Erik
- Ingvild Holthe Bygdnes as Henriette
- Øyvind Brandtzæg as Avaldsnes
- Jenny Evensen as Maria
- Steinar Klouman Hallert as Cato
- Filip Bargee Ramberg as Hallvard
- Hans Morten Hansen as Olav
- Jon Erik Myre as Georg
- Silje Breivik as Vigdis
- Anderz Eide as Kayakinstruktør
- Jon Kennedy Dushime Niyokindi as Tommy
- Magnús Blöndal Jóhannsson as Preben
- Einar Haraldsson as Tim

== Production ==
Kraken was directed by Pål Øie, known for the 2019 disaster film The Tunnel. The screenplay was written by Vilde Eide, with additional writing by Kjersti Helen Rasmussen and Natasha Arthur. It was produced by Nordisk Film Production’s John Einar Hagen and Einar Loftesnes in collaboration with Handmade Films in Norwegian Woods, a company specializing in genre titles based on Norwegian folklore. The budget was €5.3 million. TrustNordisk acquired international sales rights. Samuel Goldwyn Films handles U.S. distribution.

The film was shot in Lohja, Finland. Principal photography took place in Norwegian fjords, utilizing a mix of aerial, underwater, and practical effects to depict the creature.

== Release ==
The film originally set for release in 2025 but was later postponed and was premiered at Tromsø International Film Festival on January 23, 2026, Gothenburg Film Festival on January 29, 2026, Oslo Premiere on February 6, 2026, Monster of Film on March 22, 2026, Night Visions Film Festival on March 27, 2026, and was also screened at Brussels International Fantastic Film Festival on April 12, 2026.

The film was also released in Sweden on May 1, 2026, Philippines on May 13, 2026, under 888 Films International, and scheduled to release in Germany on July 23, 2026. However, Samuel Goldwyn Films still hasn't announced any date for the release in the United States.

== Reception ==
On the review aggregator website Rotten Tomatoes, 67% of 36 critics' reviews are positive, with an average rating of 6.30/10. The website's consensus reads: "Kraken rewards patient viewers with impressive creature-feature spectacle and mounting tension, even if its deliberate buildup and well-worn storytelling dilute the impact of its strongest moments."

Grant Hermanns of Screen Rant gave the film a rating of 7 out of 10 and wrote: It may not go down in history the way Jaws and Godzilla did, but Kraken has largely learned the right lessons from its genre predecessors to make for an enjoyable time.

John Townsend of Starburst gave the film 3 out of 5 rating and positive feedback and wrote: Ultimately, Kraken does what it sets out to do, delivering a warning on the risks of ecological tampering using a giant monster as the conduit.

Phil Hoad of The Guardian also gave the film a positive feedback and a rating of 3 out of 5 stars and he wrote: The characterisation is correspondingly lightweight, but Khorami has a calming, earth mother-type presence that renders this eco lecture-cum-rampage strangely palatable.

However, Chad Collins of Dread Central gave the film a negative feedback and a rating of 2.5 out of 5 and he said: Norwegian creature feature Kraken delivers a few Kaiju-sized thrills, but it’s too indebted to yesterday’s blockbusters to soar.

Meagan Navarro of Bloody Disgusting gave the same rating on the film and she said: While handsomely crafted, Kraken better serves its didactic messaging than its monster.

Michael Gingold of Rue Morgue also gave the film a negative review and wrote: It’s nearly an hour into this 90-minute film before [the monster] truly makes the scene... Instead, KRAKEN is content to send its characters through motions similar to those of many past movies of the same species.
