= The Bothersome Man =

- Norwegian: Den brysomme mannen
- Directed by: Jens Lien
- Written by: Per H. V. Schreiner
- Produced by: Jørgen Storm Rosenberg
- Starring: Trond Fausa Aurvåg; Petronella Barker; Per Schaanning; Birgitte Larsen; Johannes Joner
- Cinematography: John Christian Rosenlund
- Edited by: Vidar Flataukan
- Music by: Ginge Anvik
- Distributed by: Sandrew Metronome Norge A/S
- Release date: 26 May 2006
- Running time: 95 minutes
- Country: Norway
- Language: Norwegian
- Budget: NOK 14,000,000 (estimated)

The Bothersome Man (Norwegian: Den brysomme mannen) is a 2006 Norwegian film. It was directed by Jens Lien after a script by Per H.V. Schreiner. The film stars Trond Fausa Aurvåg, Petronella Barker and Per Schaanning. The story is about a man suddenly finding himself in an outwardly perfect, yet empty and unfulfilling dystopia, and his attempt to escape. The film was well received by critics, and was awarded three Amanda Awards in 2006.

== Plot ==
As the film begins, Andreas Ramsfjell is underground in a train station. He is watching a couple kiss; however, the kiss lacks any sign of aesthetics - on the contrary, it looks hideous and abominable. Andreas seems to be increasingly unsettled until eventually he steps forward and jumps off the track in front of a subway train and the scene abruptly ends.

In the following scene, he is on a bus which lets him off at a deserted gas station. An older man greets Andreas with a welcome sign and escorts him into a car. From here he makes his way into a seemingly ideal city, where he soon finds himself with a corporate job, a furnished apartment and a girlfriend. The seemingly perfect life where everyone's needs are met soon proves to be vacuous. Andreas seems to be the only person in the city capable of experiencing sensation and emotion. The only respite from the emptiness is a meaningless materialism.

As the slightly uncomfortable turns into the absurd, Andreas tries to escape, but finds there is no way out of the city. The beginning scene is revealed again in the midst of his misery after he gets his heart broken and he steps out onto the train tracks, only to find that he can survive any suicide attempt. Eventually he meets Hugo, a cleaner who has found a crack in the walls of his basement from which lovely music streams out and children are heard laughing. The two dig frantically, in secret, through the wall and discover it leads into a bright and colorful house, presumably back in the real world.

Andreas manages to get his arm into the house and grabs a handful of cake from the table, but both of them are caught and dragged out of the basement. Andreas gets thrown out of the city on the same bus that brought him there. The film ends with a violent ride into a frozen wasteland where the bus leaves Andreas, alone in a snowstorm.

== Cast ==
- Trond Fausa Aurvåg as Andreas Ramsfjell
- Petronella Barker as Anne Britt
- Per Schaanning as Hugo
- Birgitte Larsen as Ingeborg
- Johannes Joner as Håvard
- Ellen Horn as Trulsen
- Eduardo Andres Riquelme Muñoz
- Sigve Bøe as Liten Mann
- Hanne Lindbæk as Vigdis
- Ivar Lykke as Colleague 1

== Production ==
The story for the film was originally written for radio theatre, two years before it was adapted for the screen. Director Jens Lien tells that he was very affected by Schreiner's script, and that the first time he read it he was unable to sleep. Schreiner and Lien had earlier collaborated on short films, but this was the first feature-length film which they created together.

The "lovely music" in the basement is actually a recording made for thereminvox.com by theremin veteran Howard Mossman, who remains uncredited.

== Reception ==
The film was chosen for the Critics' Week of the Cannes Film Festival, and jury member Christophe Leparc expressed great admiration for the film.

The Bothersome Man was generally very well received by the Norwegian press. The newspaper Aftenposten awarded five out of six points, calling the film "advanced" and filled with literary and filmic references, yet not without a wider appeal. The television station NRK also ended up on five, calling the film thought-provoking and funny, and "very, very good".

International reviews were good. Steve Rose, writing for The Guardian, gave it three out of five stars. Noting the cultural references to other dystopic works, he complained that the film failed to get "beneath the surface of this shallow parallel reality". The A.V. Club's Noel Murray called the film "paced and plotted well throughout", though he felt it veered "too far into fantasyland" towards the end.

The film was awarded three Amandas in 2006: for "Best Direction", "Best Screenplay" and "Best Actor" (Aurvåg). It was also nominated in the categories "Best Film" and "Best Actress" (Barker). The movie also won several international awards, including the ACID Award (Agence du Cinéma Indépendant pour sa Diffusion) at the Cannes Film Festival, and the Golden Starfish at the Hampton International film festival.

On review aggregator website Rotten Tomatoes, the film holds an approval rating of 74% based on 19 reviews, with an average rating of 7.1/10.

== Soundtrack ==
The film heavily features music by Edvard Grieg. The score is composed by the Norwegian composer Ginge.
