= Sons (2006 film) =

2006 Norwegian film

- Directed by: Erik Richter Strand
- Written by: Thomas Seeberg Torjussen; Erik Richter Strand
- Produced by: Eric Vogel
- Starring: Nils Jørgen Kaalstad; Mikkel Bratt Silset; Henrik Mestad; Edward Schultheiss; Ingrid Bolsø Berdal; Marika Enstad; Joachim Rafaelsen; Anna Bache-Wiig
- Cinematography: Johan Fredrik Bødker
- Edited by: Simen Gengenbach
- Music by: Marius Christiansen; Even Johansen (Magnet)
- Distributed by: Tordenfilm AS
- Release date: 15 September 2006 (Norway)
- Running time: 103 minutes
- Country: Norway
- Language: Norwegian

Sons (Norwegian: Sønner) is a 2006 Norwegian film focusing on the conflict between a pederast and the boys with whom he has had intimate relationships (his "sons"). It is Erik Richter Strand's first feature film as a director, and the feature-film debut of producer Eric Vogel and cinematographer Johan-Fredrik Bødker.

== Plot ==
Lars (Nils Jørgen Kaalstad) is a 25-year-old man who is going nowhere in life. He is a lifeguard in a swimming hall in the eastern parts of Oslo (characterized by its lower middle class population). He is well-meaning, but he has a violent temper - the result of an unhappy, abuse-ridden childhood. His best friend Jørgen (Edward Schultheiss) is transitioning to adult life with his live-partner, Anja (Marika Enstad) and their children, but Lars is still living the bachelor's life, consisting mostly of drinking beer and playing soccer.

One day at a swimming pool, Lars recognizes Hans (Henrik Mestad), a middle-aged man with a reputation for "fiddling" with teenage boys in the neighborhood. Lars alerts Anja, the manager of the pool, that Hans is a menace who needs to be barred from the facilities. Anja says that Lars needs to get his life together and stop making uncorroborated accusations. When Lars meets Tim (Mikkel Bratt Silset), one of Hans' victims, he resolves to prevent the predator from harming any more children.

== Cast ==
- Nils Jørgen Kaalstad as Lars
- Mikkel Bratt Silset as Tim
- Edward Schultheiss as Jørgen
- Henrik Mestad as Hans
- Ingrid Bolsø Berdal as Norunn
- Anna Bache-Wiig as Heidi
- Ronnie Baraldsnes as Nyhetsanker
- Christin Borge as Dame i svømmehallen
- Terje Brevik as Prostitute's client
- Fredrik Stenberg Ditlev-Simonsen as Victim
- Marika Enstad as Anja
- Henrik Fjelldal as Roar
- Ane Hoel as Studio expert
- Lars Erik Holter as Man in Asker
- Jeppe Beck Laursen as Prostitute's client (billed as Jeppe Laursen)
- Fredrik Norrman as Torgeir
- Joachim Rafaelsen as Joakim

== Reception ==
The film received highly positive reviews from Norwegian film critics. Dagbladet's movie critic Inger Bentzrud gave the film a "die throw" of 5 out of 6, writing (translated from Norwegian): "The hunt for the molester takes place in a thriller-like race against the police. But still the film leaves a large room for reflection by providing such a multi-dimensional picture of the relationship between the perpetrator and the abused boys. As a debut work this shows both courage and social commitment".

On the webpages of TV 2, film critic Vibeke Johnsen gives the film 6 point (of 6 possible), and she wrote: "This is visionary and mainstream both at the same time. You are going to have to look around long for a film where script, direction, acting and credibility all click together as well. In other words, Sønner is a film you do not want to miss".

Variety writes: "A hard-hitting and thoughtful drama about a young man's quest to expose a pedophile, Sons is an impressive first film by young Norwegian writer-director Erik Richter Strand [...]. Intense semi-thriller maintains interest without slipping into cliche, and has an ending both satisfying and unexpected".

Sons had its international premiere at the San Sebastian Film Festival in Spain; since then, it has been featured in more than 20 film festivals worldwide. Among its numerous trophies the film has won the Fassbinder Award in Mannheim, Germany, and The Grand Jury Award at the Seattle International Film Festival in the USA.
