= Øystein Martinsen =

Norwegian actor (born 1976)

- Born: 14 May 1976 (age 49); Tromsø, Norway
- Education: Oslo National Academy of the Arts
- Occupation: Actor
- Years active: 2004–present
- Known for: Norsemen

Øystein Martinsen (born 14 May 1976 in Tromsø) is a Norwegian actor known to international audiences for his role in the Netflix series Norsemen.

== Life and career ==
Martinsen enrolled at the Oslo National Academy of the Arts in 2001, and after graduating in 2004, became a permanent employee at Rogaland Theatre in the city of Stavanger. In addition to over forty productions at this and other theatres, Martinsen has also appeared in several films and television series.

In 2012, he was nominated for the Hedda Award in the category Best Supporting Actor for his role as Philinte in The Misanthrope at Rogaland Theatre.

In 2016, Martinsen was cast in the role of Kark, a freed slave with Stockholm syndrome, in the Netflix series Norsemen, a parody of Viking life and customs. He kept the role for the duration of the show's three seasons, until March 2020.

He is the brother of electronic musician Per Martinsen.

== Selected filmography ==
=== Film ===
List of film appearances, with year, title, and role shown
| Year | Title | Role | Notes |
|---|---|---|---|
| 2005 | Naboer | Peter | |
| 2010 | Wide Blue Yonder | Young curate | Uncredited |
| 2018 | 22 July | Prime minister's aide | |

=== Television ===
List of television appearances, with year, title, and role shown
| Year | Title | Role | Notes |
|---|---|---|---|
| 2006 | Jul i Tøyengata | Abel Seidelbaum | |
| 2016–20 | Norsemen | Kark | 18 episodes |
| 2018 | Aber Bergen | Toivo Eckhoff | 5 episodes |
