= Gone with the Woman =

2007 Norwegian film

- Film poster
- Norwegian: Tatt av kvinnen
- Directed by: Petter Næss
- Written by: Johan Bogaeus (screenplay); Erlend Loe (novel); Petter Næss
- Based on: Tatt av kvinnen by Erlend Loe
- Produced by: Knud Bjørne-Larsen; Agnès Le Pont; Olav Øen
- Starring: Trond Fausa Aurvåg; Marian Saastad Ottesen; Henrik Mestad; Anna Gutto; Sten Ljunggren; Thérèse Brunnander; Peter Stormare; Louise Monot; Ingar Helge Gimle; Trude Bjercke Strøm
- Cinematography: Marius Johansen Hansen
- Edited by: Inge-Lise Langfeldt
- Music by: Aslak Hartberg
- Production company: Monster Film
- Distributed by: Arkles Entertainment; HBO Hungary; SF Norge A/S
- Release date: 2007
- Countries: France; Norway
- Languages: Norwegian; English; French

Gone with the Woman (Norwegian: Tatt av Kvinnen) is a 2007 Norwegian film directed by Petter Naess, based on Erlend Loe's debut novel of the same title. It was Norway's submission to the 80th Academy Awards for Best Foreign Language Film but was not accepted as a nominee. It tells the story of a man who falls in love with a woman and soon finds that she has completely take over his life.

== Cast ==
- Trond Fausa Aurvåg as Ham
- Marian Saastad Ottesen as Marianne
- Henrik Mestad as Tor
- Anna Gutto as Nidar Bergene
- Sten Ljunggren as Oberst Kalle
- Thérèse Brunnander as Marianne 2
- Peter Stormare as Glenn
- Louise Monot as Mirlinda
- Ingar Helge Gimle as Halfred
- Trude Bjercke Strøm as Lollik

== See also ==
- Cinema of Norway
- List of submissions to the 80th Academy Awards for Best Foreign Language Film
