= Eddie og Suzanne =

- Directed by: Arild Kristo
- Written by: Arild Kristo
- Starring: Sverre Horge; Yvonne Sparrbåge
- Release date: 11 September 1975
- Running time: 89 minutes
- Country: Norway
- Language: Norwegian

Eddie og Suzanne (English: Eddie and Suzanne) is a 1975 Norwegian drama film written and directed by Arild Kristo, starring Sverre Horge and Yvonne Sparrbåge. The film, a road movie inspired by such films as Bonnie and Clyde and Easy Rider, has been called a "modernist classic" of Norwegian cinema.

Eddie (Horge) is a young Norwegian man who has recently been released from prison, and moves to Sweden to start a new life. At a disco, he meets Suzanne (Sparrbåge) and the two fall in love. Suzanne's father, however, is a tyrannical policeman who tries to put an end to the relationship, so the two elope to France.
