= Arild Kristo =

Norwegian photographer (1939–2010)

- Born: May 17, 1939; Oslo, Norway
- Died: July 7, 2010 (aged 71); Oslo, Norway
- Education: ArtCenter College of Design; New York University
- Known for: Photography; Graphic design Filmmaking

Arild Kristo (May 17, 1939 – July 7, 2010) was a Norwegian photographer, graphic designer, actor and filmmaker. He was considered one of the most creative photographers and filmmakers in Norway during the sixties, but also one of the most rejected.

== Early life ==
Arild Kristo, born in Oslo, was the son of the cabaret singer and writer Einar Kristoffersen. At the age of 18 he enrolled on a commercial trade ship, spent a few months in New York and was offered a job as a sailor by the photographer Finn Bergan in the remake of Windjammer. Kristo got photographic education at ArtCenter College of Design and received a letter of recommendation by the editor Richard Pollard at Life (magazine).

== Career ==
In Paris 1961 Arild Kristo took one of his most appreciated and highly priced photographs, The portrait painter on Montmartre, now in the collection of the Norwegian National museum. Back in Oslo, he formed the picture agency Manité with the photographers Robert A. Robinson and Dan Young. In Berlin at Checkpoint Charlie he discovered the boy Manfred Stein, who played the lead in Kristo's first experiment in photojournalism. The series was purchased by Look (American magazine) and later was published in 17 other countries.

In 1966 he created the short film Undergrunnen / The Underground, a modernist view of the Oslo subway and the people using it. The film got big impact in the art film community and was invited to film festivals all over the world. Another short film Kristoball (1967) was directed before Arild Kristo made his feature film debut. Eddie og Suzanne, a road movie with a love theme, took six years to complete but landed 1975 in a critic and audience success. Sixteen years later, Kristo made an animated short film called Mirakelet / The Miracle, which depicted the difficulty of funding his films.
As an actor, he participated in six films, studied method acting at the National Film Center in Oslo, and for Professor Marketa Kimbrell at the New York University. In 2010, Marthe Stokvik produced the documentary The World of Arild Kristo for the film company Laterna Magica.

== Filmography ==
=== As director ===
- 1966: Undergrunnen (12 min.)
- 1967: Kristoball (11 min.)
- 1975: Eddie og Suzanne (89 min.)
- 1991: Mirakelet (13 min.)

=== As actor ===
- 1987: Over grensen as a security head

== Permanent collections ==
- The Portrait Artist on Montmartre, National Museum of Art, Architecture and Design, Norway.

== Awards ==
- World Press Photo, 1963.
