= Nils Jørgen Kaalstad =

Norwegian actor and musician (born 1979)

- Born: 23 January 1979 (age 46); Bærum, Norway
- Other names: Sideshow Jøgge
- Education: Norwegian National Academy of Theatre
- Occupations: Actor; musician
- Known for: Norsemen
- Spouse: Marian Saastad Ottesen

Nils Jørgen "Jøgge" Kaalstad (born 23 January 1979) is a Norwegian actor and musician who performs under the stage name Sideshow Jøgge. He is best known to international audiences as Dag Solstad from Lilyhammer and Arvid from Norsemen, both shown on Netflix.

== Career ==
=== Acting ===
Nils Jørgen Kaalstad was a child actor in Bærum Children's Theater between the years 1985 and 1997. At the same time, he appeared in various short films, as well as playing the roles of Olaf in Henrik Ibsen's The Pillars of Society and Anton in Det Lykkelige Valg at the National Theatre in 1992 and 1993, respectively.

He graduated from the Norwegian National Academy of Theatre in the spring of 2007. Since January 2009, he has been permanently employed as an actor at the National Theatre.

From 2012 to 2014, Kaalstad had a recurring role on the Netflix show Lilyhammer about a former New York gangster trying to start a new life in Lillehammer, Norway. In 2016, he landed a major role in the Netflix comedy series Norsemen, a parody of Viking life and customs. He kept the role for the duration of the show's three seasons, until March 2020.

In 2019, Kaalstad received the Hedda Award in the category Best Male Actor for his role in the play Uten navn - Å miste sine nærmeste by Mattis Herman Nyquist and Fredrik Høyer.

=== Music ===
Kaalstad performs as an electronic musician under the stage name Sideshow Jøgge, often with collaborator Olav Brekke Mathisen. They have made a number of music videos for other artists such as Snuten and King Midas, as well as commercials, including for Quart Festival 2005. The duo released the album N*A*O*M*B (Nugatti All Ova Me Butty) in 2003.

== Personal life ==
In 2018, Kaalstad married actress Marian Saastad Ottesen, who also stars in Lilyhammer and Norsemen.

== Selected filmography ==
=== Film ===
List of film appearances, with year, title, and role shown
Year	Title	Role	Notes
2006	Sons	Lars	
2008	Fallen Angels	Harry Kløve	
2008	Fatso	Rino	
2011	Headhunters	Stig	

=== Television ===
List of television appearances, with year, title, and role shown
Year	Title	Role	Notes
2012	Spiral	Morten Kelso	5 episodes
2012–14	Lilyhammer	Dag Solstad	12 episodes
2014	Crossing Lines	Antti Fengerer	1 episode
2016–20	Norsemen	Arvid	18 episodes
2019	Beforeigners	Sexton	2 episodes
