= Norsemen (TV series) =

Norwegian comedy television series

- Promotional poster
- Vikingane
- Genre: Comedy
- Created by: Jon Iver Helgaker; Jonas Torgersen
- Developed by: Viafilm; NRK
- Written by: Jon Iver Helgaker; Jonas Torgersen
- Starring: Kåre Conradi; Nils Jørgen Kaalstad; Trond Fausa Aurvåg; Silje Torp; Henrik Mestad
- Composer: Johannes Ringen
- Country of origin: Norway
- Original languages: Norwegian (Norway); English (International)
- No. of series: 3
- No. of episodes: 18

Production
- Executive producers: Marianne Arsky-Andersen; Odd Gunnar Iversen
- Producers: Anders Tangen; Øyvind Thoen
- Running time: 30 minutes

Original release
- Network: NRK1 (Norway); Netflix (International)
- Release: 21 October 2016 – 13 March 2020

Norsemen is a Norwegian comedy television series about a group of Vikings living in the village of Norheim around the year 790. It originally premiered in Norway under the name Vikingane (The Vikings) on NRK1 in October 2016. It is produced for NRK by Viafilm. The series is written and directed by Jon Iver Helgaker and Jonas Torgersen.

The series is filmed in the village of Avaldsnes in Karmøy municipality, Rogaland, Norway, and it was recorded simultaneously in both Norwegian and English-language versions by filming each scene twice. The first season of the English version was made available on Netflix in August 2017 under the name Norsemen, and season two, which was filmed in early 2017, was made available in October 2018. The third season is named 'Season 0', as it tells the story that led up to season 1.

In September 2020, it was announced that the show had been canceled and would not return for a fourth season.

== Synopsis ==
Norsemen takes place in 790s Norway, with various characters taking leading roles and forming their own storylines as the series develops. The story covers the lives of Vikings in the village of Norheim, with their day-to-day mundanities and strifes presented to high comedic effect. As the series progresses, disputes with neighbouring villages—such as a rival community led by the ruthless Jarl Varg—and the efforts of Roman slave Rufus to modernise and sophisticate Norheim's culture result in ongoing conflicts and dramas.

== Cast and characters ==
- Henrik Mestad as Chieftain Olav, the leader of the village. He finds a route to sail west, and is in possession of a much-coveted map.
- Marian Saastad Ottesen as Hildur, Olav's wife
- Nils Jørgen Kaalstad as Arvid, the chieftain's second-in-command. He loves to go on raids but he also wants to settle in the village.
- Kåre Conradi as Orm, Olav's closeted homosexual brother and husband of Frøya
- Silje Torp as Frøya, a shield-maiden who joins in on raids and is married to Orm
- Trond Fausa Aurvåg as Rufus, an enslaved actor from Rome who befriends Orm and plans to modernize the village
- Øystein Martinsen as Kark, a freed slave who has voluntarily returned to his life as a slave after being institutionalized
- Jon Øigarden as Jarl Varg, the regional overlord and main antagonist of the show
- Kristine Riis as Liv, Arvid's gold digger wife
- Bjørn Myrene as Torstein Hund, Varg's right-hand man
- Mikkel Bratt Silset as Ragnar, Arvid's right-hand man
- André Eriksen as Ørn, a local Viking
- Thorbjørn Harr as Jarl Bjørn, Varg's former friend, turned enemy
- Stig Frode Henriksen as Vebjørn

== Episodes ==
Series	Episodes	Originally released	
Series	Episodes	First released	Last released
1	6	21 October 2016	25 November 2016
2	6	3 November 2017	3 November 2017
3	6	21 February 2020	13 March 2020

=== Season 1 (2016) ===
No. overall	No. in season	Title	Directed by	Written by	Original release date	Norway viewers (millions)
1	1	"The Homecoming"	Jon Iver Helgaker & Jonas Torgersen	Jon Iver Helgaker & Jonas Torgersen	21 October 2016	N/A
Chieftain Olav of Norheim and Arvid, his second in command, return from a raid with Rufus, an uptight Roman actor who doesn’t seem to realise that as a slave, he is not entitled to an opinion or wages. Kark, another slave, takes elderly men from Norheim for an Ättestupa so they will not become burdens in their old age, but most of them choose exile instead. As a career raider, Arvid is tired of having no wife or property. Orm, Olav's cowardly and unpopular brother, is unhappy at Olav's return as he must give up being acting chief; he barely gets a greeting from his raider wife, Frøya, who he is upset to learn, took part in the raping of monks with much enthusiasm. Rufus is outraged that he is expected to sleep in a pigsty with Kark. Arvid challenges Olvar, a rich farmer, to a Holmgang for his farm and his wife, Liv. As Olvar cannot refuse without being exiled, he is forced to agree and is summarily split in half by the superior warrior, who takes over his farm and marries Liv.
2	2	"The Escape"	Jon Iver Helgaker & Jonas Torgersen	Jon Iver Helgaker & Jonas Torgersen	28 October 2016	N/A
Arvid struggles being a farmer and husband to Liv, who is cruel and hypercritical. Rufus learns Kark was freed years ago but stayed in Norheim due to being institutionalised. Unwilling to risk this himself, Rufus escapes. Olav arranges a hunt for Rufus, but Liv forbids Arvid from going so they can have a mead and poetry evening with Orm and her friends Ansgar and Lone. Rufus is taken prisoner by woodsmen who plan to sacrifice him to Odin, but he convinces them otherwise by using magic tricks and mime. Watching from nearby, Olav and his men are impressed at Rufus' supposed magic and recapture him. Olav punishes the woodsmen's leader by cutting off his ear. After being mocked for not understanding poetry, Arvid punches Lone and storms out. Olav warns Arvid to stand up for himself and not let Liv change who he is. Arvid returns home and finds himself locked out by Liv. Orm asks Rufus about his magic and becomes fascinated by acting. Olav is stabbed by the man whose ear he took.
3	3	"The Funeral"	Jon Iver Helgaker & Jonas Torgersen	Jon Iver Helgaker & Jonas Torgersen	4 November 2016	N/A
A dying Olav tells Arvid he will be the next chieftain and must give Norheim's map to the west to Jarl Varg, a mentally unstable chieftain who could destroy Norheim. Arvid confides Olav's decision to Hildur, and she seduces him as he is now the new leader. Orm kills Olav before he can publicly announce his decision. Without Olav to claim otherwise, Arvid is forced to let Orm become chieftain. Orm's poor archery skills fail to set Olav's funeral raft on fire, dooming him to never reach Valhalla as he drifts to sea. Varg's men arrive for the map and Kark reveals he put the map on Olav's raft. Varg's men leave but Orm, realising the map's value, orders Kark to retrieve it. Orm puts Rufus in charge of theatre and Rufus suggests a sculpture. Orm uses his new authority to prove Hildur authored graffiti against him, and is legally allowed to punch her; Hildur swears revenge. Kark returns with the map but finds Orm unappreciative as he has decided to abandon raiding to make Norheim a cultural capital. Orm orders Rufus' sculpture to be built, but without enough metal, an unwilling Orm is forced to plan a new raid, to Arvid's delight.
4	4	"The Raid"	Jon Iver Helgaker & Jonas Torgersen	Jon Iver Helgaker & Jonas Torgersen	11 November 2016	N/A
Liv is furious that Arvid is going on a raid to enjoy himself. Orm decides to join the raid and leaves Rufus in charge, hiring mercenary Sturla Bonecrusher as his bodyguard. Rufus puts Kark in charge of building his theatre. One of the other slaves insults Rufus, who orders him punished, not realising Sturla's idea of punishment is violent murder. Onboard ship, Arvid grows close to Orm's wife, Frøya. Reaching England, Orm jumps from the ship too early and almost drowns and though everyone is tempted to let him, Frøya saves him. Rufus is frustrated when Kark builds his theatre only a few inches tall, having built it to the scale of Rufus' drawing, and demands it to be rebuilt properly. Orm awakens after the raid is over and insists on fighting the only survivor, a young girl, only narrowly winning. Arvid and Frøya begin a sexual relationship before they sail home. Rufus goes out of his way to abuse his authority, but when Sturla abruptly leaves after learning Rufus has no more money to pay him, the villagers get revenge on Rufus by tarring and feathering him.
5	5	"The Siege"	Jon Iver Helgaker & Jonas Torgersen	Jon Iver Helgaker & Jonas Torgersen	18 November 2016	N/A
The raiders return and Rufus finds that while they stole gold, there is no metal he can use for his sculpture, so Orm declares the warriors must surrender their weapons. Varg's men, hearing of the raid, demand their leader's share. Orm claims they raided East, despite their captured slaves claiming they were captured in England, and gives them a pittance and one slave. Arvid hides some of the weapons in the woods. Varg decides to destroy Norheim. Orm unveils the sculpture, but the villagers fail to understand why they had to give up their weapons for this. Rufus begins rehearsals with Orm, Arvid, and Kark dressed as women. Varg and his men attack and the unarmed warriors are quickly captured. The women are placed in the main hall, including Orm, Arvid, and Kark in their dresses. Torstein, Varg's second in command, decides to rape a woman and selects Orm. Arvid and Kark sneak into Orm's bedroom and find him having enthusiastic sex with Torstein, before knocking Torstein unconscious. Orm protests his innocence despite Arvid finding drawings of naked men in his belongings while looking for the map to the west.
6	6	"The Duel"	Jon Iver Helgaker & Jonas Torgersen	Jon Iver Helgaker & Jonas Torgersen	25 November 2016	N/A
Orm, Arvid, and Kark escape into the woods. Varg offers to let Orm live in exchange for the map, so Orm betrays the others but realises Arvid swapped the map with Orm's naked drawings. Varg decides to blood eagle Orm, so the cowardly Viking gives up Arvid. Varg threatens to rape Liv and Liv happily agrees. Varg, however, suffers an embarrassing case of erectile dysfunction. Kark leads Arvid to the elderly men who decided not to Ättestupa and who are living in the woods; they agree to fight on his behalf in order to regain honour. Arvid defeats Varg but spares his life. Varg attempts to stab Arvid in the back so Frøya severs his hands. Arvid is made chieftain and has crude prosthetics made for Varg as a gesture of peace. Orm and Rufus are buried up to their necks as punishment, allowing Hildur to get her revenge against Orm by urinating on his head. Liv is forced to move into Kark's pigsty for having expressed a desire for sex with Varg, while Arvid starts a relationship with Frøya. Liv decides to escape with Orm and Rufus, so Arvid and Frøya shoot arrows into their buttocks as a sign of good riddance. As Arvid and Frøya prepare to settle down together, Hildur reveals that when she seduced Arvid, she became pregnant with his child.

=== Season 2 (2017) ===
No. overall	No. in season	Title	Directed by	Written by	Original release date	Norway viewers (millions)
7	1	"East vs West"	Jon Iver Helgaker & Jonas Torgersen	Jon Iver Helgaker & Jonas Torgersen	3 November 2017	N/A
With Arvid chieftain, the Norheim Vikings have resumed their raiding lifestyle. Arvid and Frøya's relationship is strained as Hildur, pregnant with Arvid's child, has moved in with them. Varg has grown depressed since losing his hands and without the map to the West is limited to pillaging the poor lands to the east. Orm, Rufus, and Liv have spent months walking to Rome but do not realise they are simply lost in the forest a short walk from Norheim. They come across Sturla Bonecrusher who, realising Orm and Rufus are outlaws, captures them while Liv runs away. Varg is forced to sell crippled slaves to make money and is infuriated when Arvid and Frøya flaunt their wealth from England and dismiss him as harmless without his hands, so he swears revenge. Hakon, one of Varg's men, has been acting unusual since Varg tried to rape Liv, considering it too vicious even by Varg's normal standards, and decides to approach Varg about their hostile work environment. Sturla returns Orm and Rufus to Norheim, where the Lawspeaker declares that as long as the Lawspeaker lives, Orm and Rufus are to be treated as slaves.
8	2	"Slavebound"	Jon Iver Helgaker & Jonas Torgersen	Jon Iver Helgaker & Jonas Torgersen	3 November 2017	N/A
The other slaves grow to hate Orm as they are punished every time he is lazy. Hakon leads Varg's men to air their grievances and demand their feelings be respected, so Varg has Hakon impaled on a spear. Arvid proposes marriage to Frøya with a ring made of a dead monk's foreskin. Upon returning home, Arvid finds Liv and the Lawspeaker, who tell him that, under Viking law, Arvid had no right to divorce Liv, and Arvid was actually the one at fault as he got Hildur pregnant and is currently having an affair with Frøya. Frøya is devastated to find Liv has returned and Liv throws both Frøya and Hildur out of the house. Varg hires a master thief to infiltrate Norheim and steal the map to the West. Under pressure from Liv, Arvid introduces the idea of protection money to Norheim, where he won't burn down people's farms if they pay him. Frøya returns Arvid's ring, needing time to consider their relationship. Varg's thief infiltrates Norheim but is crushed by a falling rock trap as soon as he touches the map.
9	3	"Hand Job"	Jon Iver Helgaker & Jonas Torgersen	Jon Iver Helgaker & Jonas Torgersen	3 November 2017	N/A
Varg demands his blacksmiths create advanced prosthetics, promising gold to the successful smith, and death to those who fail. Arvid and Frøya renew their relationship. Varg learns of the thief's death and is furious. Hildur tries to appeal to Arvid for the sake of their baby, but he is overruled by Liv. Varg decides he must convince someone from Norheim to betray Arvid. Hildur, revealed to have been faking her pregnancy, claims she gave birth in the woods and uses rabbit blood as evidence a wolf ate the baby, making Arvid feel guilty. Orm becomes depressed when he realises even slaves don't want to be friends with him. Varg has Orm kidnapped and easily convinces him to betray Arvid. Orm induces Rufus to help in exchange for freedom. Varg is impressed with the final blacksmith, having killed all the others, and is outfitted with realistic-looking steel hands. Following Varg's plan, Orm and Rufus set a swarm of wasps on the Lawspeaker, who is allergic to wasp stings, since Orm must only stay a slave as long as the Lawspeaker is alive. However, Orm panics when the Lawspeaker is found seriously ill but alive.
10	4	"Vengeance"	Jon Iver Helgaker & Jonas Torgersen	Jon Iver Helgaker & Jonas Torgersen	3 November 2017	N/A
Orm stabs the Lawspeaker to death in front of Arvid and other witnesses, who naively believe his claim it was a mercy killing to spare his suffering. They also believe a note left behind claiming the Lawspeaker accidentally set the wasps on himself and appointing Rufus as the new Lawspeaker. With Orm freed and Rufus Lawspeaker, Orm foolishly brags of his plan to become chieftain again to Kark, who passes on his suspicion of Orm's impending treachery to Arvid; Arvid is unconcerned, however. He is also unconcerned when Torstein turns up to the Lawspeaker's funeral with a cryptic threat from Varg, which Arvid fails to understand. Orm gets revenge against the slaves for ignoring him by having them buried alive together with the body of the Lawspeaker, in order to be his slaves in the next life; only Kark is spared as he performs the burial task. Orm has Rufus declare Frøya to still be his wife, which causes Frøya anguish. When Arvid next visits the farms for protection money, he finds the farmers have organised a peasant army to demand democracy. Arvid responds by having their leader, Eigil, Olvar's twin brother, beaten.
11	5	"The Thing"	Jon Iver Helgaker & Jonas Torgersen	Jon Iver Helgaker & Jonas Torgersen	3 November 2017	N/A
Eigil marshals his peasant army against Norheim but their inexperience leads to their death, all except Eigil. Arvid attends an Althing with other chieftains, including Varg, so they can solve disputes peacefully. Varg claims Arvid's map to the West is his as promised by Chieftain Olav, but Arvid counter-claims that Varg attacked Norheim, negating any right Varg had to the map. The Althing declares Arvid owner of the document. Varg introduces the nomad leader missing an ear, who admits he stabbed Olav to death, provoking Arvid. For committing violence during the Althing, Arvid is declared an outlaw, just as Varg and Orm planned. Rufus declares Orm chieftain again and Arvid jumps off the edge of a cliff. Suspecting their involvement, Frøya warns Orm and Rufus that if she finds they betrayed Arvid, she will kill them. Returning home, Liv is furious she is no longer chieftain's wife and must move out of the chieftain's longhouse. Frøya punches Liv for caring more about herself than Arvid. Eigil returns to his family with the news they are now responsible for farming all of Norheim by themselves. Varg plans revenge against Frøya for taking his hands.
12	6	"The Last Domino"	Jon Iver Helgaker & Jonas Torgersen	Jon Iver Helgaker & Jonas Torgersen	3 November 2017	N/A
Orm announces he has made peace with Varg. Rufus plans to return to Rome. Frøya goes to her and Arvid's romantic spot to mourn and finds Arvid alive, having survived his jump, and he outlines his newest plan. Hildur notices Frøya acting happy and coaxes her to admit that Arvid is alive. Varg arrives for the map and is furious to learn that, far from it being a complicated route to England, all that was required was to sail west in a straight line. Before leaving, Varg demands Frøya's hands and when she refuses, stabs her in the back with two blades hidden in his prosthetics. With Frøya dead, Liv seduces Orm, even though he disgusts her. To celebrate Rufus' departure, Orm holds a farewell feast where Hildur succeeds in drugging him, Rufus, and Liv. The next morning, the three awake to discover Norheim completely abandoned, with Arvid, Hildur, the villagers, and even Eigil and his family having taken everything of value to establish a colony in England without them. Arvid learns that Frøya is dead. Hildur takes advantage of his grief and suggests they get married and rule the colony together. Varg begins planning his first raid to England.

=== Season 3 (2020) ===
No. overall	No. in season	Title	Directed by	Written by	Original release date	
13	1	"Thin Up Top"	Jon Iver Helgaker & Jonas Torgersen	Jon Iver Helgaker & Jonas Torgersen	21 February 2020	N/A
Note: This is a prequel season and depicts events before Season 1 Varg lives happily with his wife, Reidur, best friend Jarl Bjørn, and his luxurious hair, but when Bjørn points out Varg is going bald, Varg goes mad and murders Reidur, Bjørn, and Bjorn's family in a fire. In Norheim, Orm has been groping men at night near the toilet pit but frames an elderly woman for the crime, who is then executed. Liv toils as a Norheim slave with her husband Arnstein and three children. Hildur catches Orm in a secret tunnel beneath the toilet. Olav keeps Orm's crime secret so no shame will be brought on the family but sentences him to start acting like a Viking, marry a woman, and give up his crocheting hobby. Orm agrees, as he is lonely and hopes a wife might spend time with him. Olav and Hildur ask Frøya, an antisocial hunter, to consider marrying Orm, hoping her bloodthirstiness might influence him to at least act honourably, and Frøya agrees to consider it. Varg grows more depressed as his bald spot grows larger. Bjørn is shown to have survived the fire.
14	2	"Bachelor Party"	Jon Iver Helgaker & Jonas Torgersen	Jon Iver Helgaker & Jonas Torgersen	21 February 2020	N/A
Frøya agrees to marry Orm if Olav makes her a warrior, and Olav agrees after she defeats Arvid and successfully rapes another warrior. Orm fails to find a best man since no one likes him. Liv's freedom is purchased by Olvar, whom she marries, leaving Arnstein and her children as slaves. Olav reveals to Hildur and Orm he had an older brother, Karl, the rightful chieftain whom their father sent North as a baby, with the letter "N" tattooed on his back as proof of his identity. Kark, who has the same tattoo, tries to reveal it but instinctively obeys when told to shut up by Orm. Arvid visits Varg, now called Jarl Varg, and completely bald, with an invitation to Orm's bachelor party. Hildur, unwilling to let Kark become chieftain and give up being chieftain's wife, whips him until the letter "N" on his back is illegible. Arvid becomes attracted to Liv, who is already bored with Olvar. Kark tries to show Olav his tattoo, not realising it is ruined, and Olav rejects him. Hardly anyone attends Orm's bachelor party, and the few guests leave early and go to their own party without Orm.
15	3	"Wedding and Sacrifice"	Jon Iver Helgaker & Jonas Torgersen	Jon Iver Helgaker & Jonas Torgersen	28 February 2020	N/A
Bjørn begins gathering an army for revenge against Varg. Knowing Frøya has lots of experience while Orm is still a virgin, Olav demonstrates the birds and the bees by making Orm watch as he has sex with Hildur; Orm still doesn't entirely understand, however. Olav gives Frøya weapons, armour, and a wedding dress to distract her from Orm's personality before the wedding. He also advises Orm not to be his overly needy self when he meets Frøya. At the wedding, Liv makes it clear she has lost all sexual interest in Olvar as the proximity of Norheim's social elite arouses her considerably more than he does. Frøya arrives to the wedding in armour, pleasing Orm, who at first mistakes her for a muscular man. The slaves are disappointed to learn one of them will be sacrificed as part of the wedding. Varg realises Bjørn is still alive when he sees a wedding gift from him and descends into full mental instability, declaring that Olav owes him ten percent of the wedding gifts as a tax in preparation for war. Orm eventually succeeds in having sex with Frøya after managing to locate his unusually small penis.
16	4	"War Table"	Jon Iver Helgaker & Jonas Torgersen	Jon Iver Helgaker & Jonas Torgersen	6 March 2020	N/A
Frøya quickly realises how annoying Orm can be. Varg begins gathering his allies for war. Completely sick of Olvar, Liv agrees to return to Arnstein and run away to Iceland. Orm insists on accompanying Olav to Varg's war council to be close to an increasingly annoyed Frøya. Varg sets up a cursed Nithing pole against Bjorn, then forces Torstein to kill his own father and brother when they get in the way of the pole and are cursed to die. Varg attempts to outline his plan but his war table is a failure; Arvid suggests that the table was poorly constructed, so Varg punishes his carpenter by removing his limbs, tongue, and genitals. Liv begins preparations to leave Olvar but decides to stay when Olvar buys her jewellery. Varg plans to convince a dragon, rumoured to live in a nearby valley, to destroy Bjørn for him, and agrees to pay the dragon's owner to fight for him, despite not being allowed to see the beast first. Liv informs Arnstein that she is staying with Olvar, and that she has sold Arnstein and their children to Sturla Bonecrusher.
17	5	"Do You Believe in Dragons?"	Jon Iver Helgaker & Jonas Torgersen	Jon Iver Helgaker & Jonas Torgersen	6 March 2020	N/A
Olav agrees to give Frøya a break by putting a reluctant Orm in charge of the older warriors, who want to die in battle so they can reach Valhalla. On the day of the battle, Bjørn requests a simple apology from Varg for the murder of his family, but Varg, still blaming Bjørn for his baldness, refuses and declares he will use a dragon against him. The dragon's owner eventually arrives, claiming the creature slept in late. Humiliated and believing she lied about the dragon even existing, Varg has her executed. Meanwhile, the dragon is seen flying towards the battlefield, unbeknownst to Varg; as it sees its owner die, it flies back. Now facing a real battle, Orm cowardly suggests a flanking manoeuvre to his regiment of old men, but in reality proceeds to wander aimlessly in the woods, feeding squirrels, until after the battle is done, thus denying his men their final chance to reach Valhalla. Nonetheless, he proudly claims his walking blisters as his first battle scars. Varg captures Bjørn and demands everyone attend a feast instead of tending to the wounded.
18	6	"Scrotum Whipping"	Jon Iver Helgaker & Jonas Torgersen	Jon Iver Helgaker & Jonas Torgersen	13 March 2020	N/A
Varg has Bjørn's head shaved but delays his execution until after the feast, despite being warned Bjørn might escape. Olav praises Orm for not losing a single man in battle, until one of Orm's men publicly reveals that Orm deliberately led them away from the battle; Varg has Orm publicly dishonoured as punishment. Running away from the feast, Orm comes across Bjørn, who convinces him they are friends, so Orm helpfully loosens the ropes around Bjørn's wrists. Furious at the latter's escape, Varg has Orm imprisoned; while there, the captive meets an Arab man for the first time and learns he has travelled the world and seen a wealthy country, England, to the west. Orm has never heard of this place. Varg orders Orm executed by blood eagle and Orm regrets that he never got to visit England. Curious about England's raiding prospects, Olav offers to find England and make a map of the journey for Varg in exchange for Orm's life. Varg spares Orm but has his testicles whipped in public. Olav immediately sets out on a raid, leaving Orm as temporary chief, and invades an English monastery, slaughtering the monks, stealing their gold, and capturing an uptight Roman actor named Rufus as a slave.

== Reception and awards ==
The first season averaged more than one million viewers in Norway, a country with a population of a little over five million.

The New York Times called Norsemen one of the 10 best international TV series in 2017, and one of the best international TV shows of the decade. The Guardian ranked Norsemen the 29th best TV show of 2017.

Norwegian writer Marie Kleve praised the parody violence and how it reflects stories from our time while the characters are living in the Viking era.

The Guardian gave the show a glowing review, and described it as "Monty Python meets Game of Thrones."

The first season of Norsemen won the Gullruten award in 2017 for Best Comedy Show, and it was also nominated for Best Sound Production (Peter Clausen and Erling Rein). The second season was also nominated, and season 3 won the Gullruten award in 2020 for Best Comedy Show, while Bjørn Myrene was nominated for Best Supporting Actor.
