= Elsk meg i morgen =

2005 Norwegian comedy film

- Directed by: Petter Næss
- Written by: Åse Vikene; Ingvar Ambjørnsen (novel)
- Starring: Per Christian Ellefsen; Sven Nordin
- Release date: 23 September 2005
- Running time: 93 minutes
- Country: Norway
- Language: Norwegian

Elsk meg i morgen (English: "Love me tomorrow") is a 2005 Norwegian comedy film directed by Petter Næss, starring Per Christian Ellefsen and Sven Nordin. The film was based on a novel by Ingvar Ambjørnsen, and is a sequel to Elling. In this installment of the series, which takes place four years after the original, Elling is looking for love.
