= Petter Næss =

Norwegian actor and film director (born 1960)

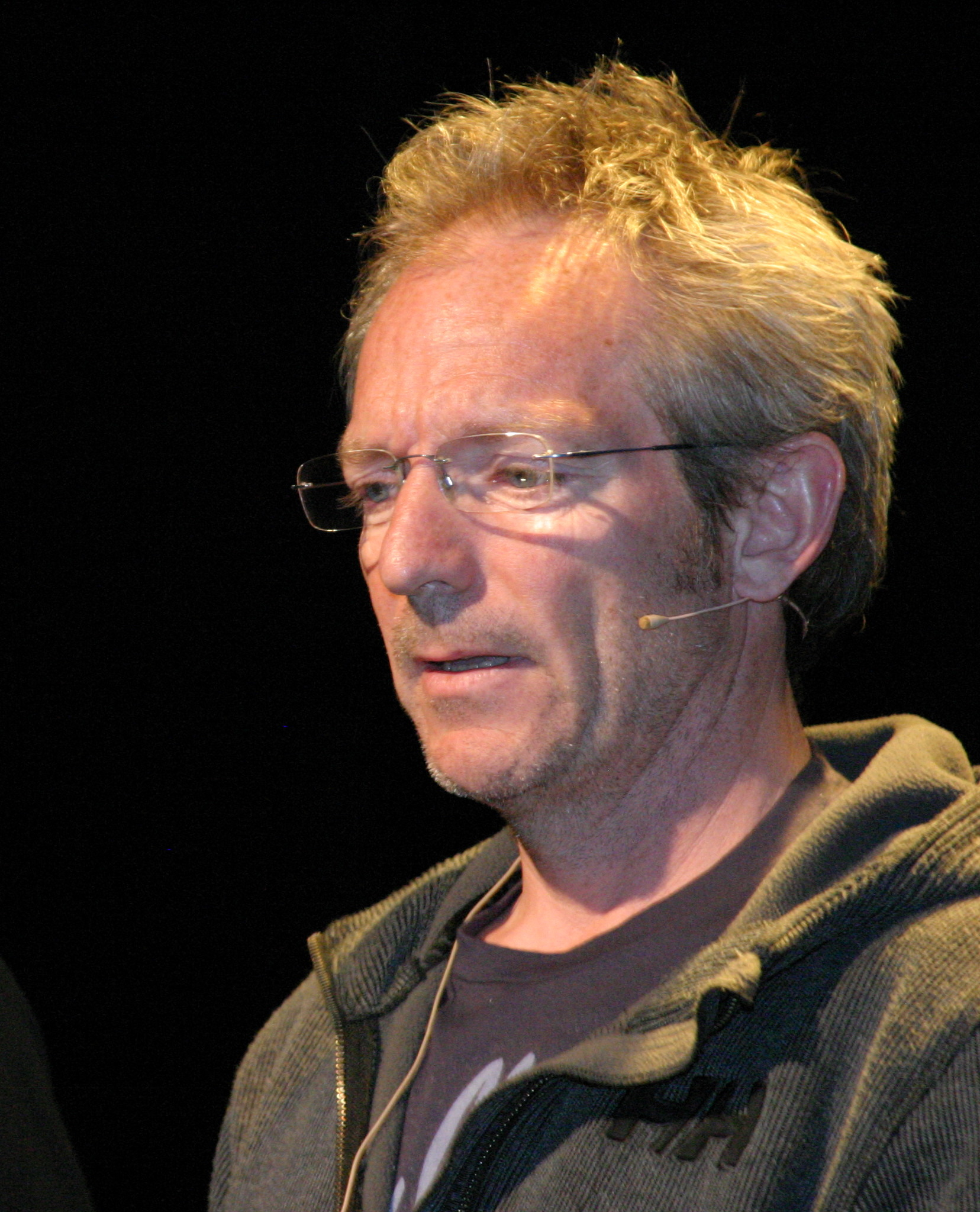
- Petter Næss in 2007
- Born: 14 March 1960 (age 66); Oslo, Norway
- Occupations: Actor, film director

Petter Næss (born 14 March 1960, Oslo, Norway) is a Norwegian actor, screenwriter, instructor, and film director. He debuted in 1999 with Absolutt blåmandag and directed films based on Ingvar Ambjørnsen's Elling series, including Elling (2001) and Elsk meg i morgen (2005). He also directed films like Bare Bea (2003) and Mozart and the Whale (2005). In 2008, he portrayed Martin Linge in Max Manus:Man of War. Since 1996, he has worked as a director at Oslo Nye Teater, including for Elling's stage version.

== Career ==
Næss's career began at the Fjernsynsteatret (Television Theatre) as a production assistant. He worked across theater, film directing, and acting, starting his career in the 1980s with roles in theater, film, and TV.

== Film and TV ==
In 1999, Næss made his directorial debut with Absolutt blåmandag. After the success of Elling, he directed Mozart and the Whale (2005) in Hollywood, starring Josh Hartnett. In 2007, he released Tatt Av Kvinnen and appeared in Max Manus (2008) as Kaptein Martin Linge. Næss's Elling was nominated for the Academy Award for Best Foreign Language Film in 2002.

== Theater ==
Næss has been involved with Centralteatret since 1996, serving as an instructor and contributing to projects like Mbappé. He has also worked as a director at Oslo Nye Teater.

== Other ==
In 2022, TrustNordisk sold 'Max Verstappen', Næss’s Norwegian drama comedy.

== Filmography ==
- Absolute Hangover (1999)
- Elling (2001)
- Elsk meg i morgen (2005)
- Mozart and the Whale (2005)
- Hoppet (2007)
- Gone with the Woman (2007)
- Into the White (2012)
