= Trond Fausa Aurvåg =

Norwegian actor, film director, and poet

- Born: 2 December 1972 (age 53); Fetsund, Norway
- Occupations: Actor, director
- Years active: 1997-present
- Spouse: Lena Kristin Ellingsen

Trond Fausa Aurvåg (born 2 December 1972) is a Norwegian actor, film director, and poet.

After graduating from the Norwegian National Academy of Theatre in 2001, he has acted at Oslo Nye Teater since 2001. Here he has acted in plays such as Amadeus, Manndomsprøven and Tatt av kvinnen. As a film actor he is best known for his leading roles in the films Andreaskorset (2004) and Den brysomme mannen (2006). He has also starred in the music video for Lemaitre's song "We Got U".

He won two Amandas—the main Norwegian film award—in 2006, for best actor for his role in Den brysomme mannen, and for the short film Alene menn sammen, which he directed. He gained some international attention co-starring with Steven Van Zandt in the TV series Lilyhammer, playing Van Zandt's partner in crime. For this role he won the Gullruten Award in 2014 for best actor. He plays a role in Christopher Nolan's film, Oppenheimer, where he portrays the Ukrainian scientist George Kistiakowsky.

== Filmography ==
Key
| † | Denotes films that have not yet been released |

=== Film ===
Film and Television appearances correct as of August 2024

| Year | Title | Role | Notes |
|---|---|---|---|
| 1997 | Junk Mail | Espen | |
| 1998 | Bloody Angels | Tommy | Norwegian: 1732 Høtten |
| 2000 | Døren som ikke smakk | Main | Short |
| 2002 | Kutt | | Short |
| 2003 | Loose Ends | | Short |
| 2003 | Offside | Ingroy | Short |
| 2004 | The Crossing | Andreas | |
| 2004 | Spillet | Papa | Short |
| 2006 | Klippan i livet | Per | Short |
| 2006 | The Bothersome Man | Andreas | Norwegian: Den brysomme mannen, Amanda Award for Best Actor |
| 2007 | Gone with the Woman | Han | Norwegian: Tatt av Kvinnen |
| 2008 | Forlat oss vår skyld | Svein | Short |
| 2009 | Eksperiment | Anders | Short |
| 2010 | Home for Christmas | Paul | Norwegian: Hjen til jul |
| 2010 | Friendly People | | Short, Norwegian: Vennlige mennesker |
| 2011 | Twigson in Trouble | Lille-Knerten | Voice |
| 2011 | King Curling | Ornitolog | Uncredited, Norwegian: Kong Curling |
| 2013 | I Am Yours | Martin | Norwegian: Jeg er din |
| 2014 | Glass Dolls | Advokat | |
| 2014 | Rulletrappen | | Voice, Short |
| 2017 | Thin Ice | Gunnar | TV movie |
| 2019 | Captain Sabertooth and the Magic Diamond | Benjamin | Voice, Norwegian: Kaptein Sabeltann og den magiske diamant |
| 2019 | Legend of the Ghost Dagger | Olav | |
| 2021 | The Middle Man | Bob Spencer | |
| 2023 | Oppenheimer | George Kistiakowsky | |
| 2023 | Bukkene Bruse på Badeland | Storebror | |
| 2026 | Greenland 2: Migration | Lars | |
| TBA | The Right Track † | | Post-production |

=== Television ===
| Year | Title | Role | Notes |
|---|---|---|---|
| 2001 | Nissene på låven | Steven Evensen | 24 episodes |
| 2006 | Etaten | Vidar | 2 episodes |
| 2010 | Påpp & Råkk | Tyggis | 2 episodes |
| 2011 | Åse Tonight | Trygve | 6 episodes |
| 2011 | Nissene over skog og hei | Steven Evensen | 24 episodes |
| 2012-2014 | Lilyhammer | Torgeir Lien | 24 episodes |
| 2014-2024 | Neste sommer | Per Ivar | 109 episodes |
| 2016-2020 | Norsemen | Rufus | 18 episodes, Norwegian: Vikingane, Gullruten award for Best Actor |
| 2017-2019 | Jul i Blodfjell | Svein Soot | TV Mini Series, 48 episodes |
| 2018 | The Innocents | Alf | 4 episodes |
| 2018-2019 | ZombieLars | Morten | 3 episodes |
| 2020 | Stardust | Varg | 23 episodes |
| 2021 | Nissene i bingen | Steven | 24 episodes |
| 2023 | Captain Fall | Nico | Voice, 10 episodes |
| 2024 | Still Looking | Kennet | TV Mini Series, 8 episodes |
| 2024 | MILF of Norway | Lars Berg | 8 episodes |
| TBA | Haven † | Noah Johansen | Pre-production, 4 episodes |

== Personal life ==
Aurvåg lives with his wife, actress Lena Kristin Ellingsen, in Oslo.
