= Hellums kro =

Norwegian comedy-drama television series

- Genre: Comedy drama
- Created by: Bjarte Tjøstheim
- Starring: Bjarte Tjøstheim; Gine Cornelia Pedersen; Finn Schau; Henrik Elvestad; Anna-Lisa Kumoji; Kristoffer Olsen; Sofia Knudsen Estefanos
- Country of origin: Norway
- Original language: Norwegian
- No. of seasons: 1
- No. of episodes: 6

Production
- Running time: 26–30 minutes

Original release
- Network: NRK
- Release: 2 November – 30 November 2019

Hellums kro (English: Hellum's Diner) is a Norwegian comedy-drama series that premiered in 2019 on NRK.

The setting is a fictional diner owned by Mr. Hellum (Finn Schau). The location is Nebbenes diner in Eidsvoll adjacent to the European route E6, which has outlets at both the northbound and southbound lanes (though in real life, the latter closed in 2017). These outlets are managed by Bjarte Tjøstheim and Gine Cornelia Pedersen's characters, who start a rivalry to become manager of the Hellum consortium. The rest of the cast are the staff at the two diners.
