= Lilyhammer =

Norwegian-American television series

- Lilyhammer poster
- Genre: Crime; Comedy drama Black comedy
- Created by: Anne Bjørnstad; Eilif Skodvin
- Written by: Anne Bjørnstad; Eilif Skodvin; Steven Van Zandt
- Directed by: Simen Alsvik; Geir Henning Hopland; Lisa Marie Gamlem; Ole Endresen; Øystein Karlsen; Tuva Novotny; Steven Van Zandt
- Starring: Steven Van Zandt; Trond Fausa Aurvåg; Steinar Sagen; Marian Saastad Ottesen; Sven Nordin; Kyrre Hellum; Anne Krigsvoll; Henrik Mestad
- Theme music composer: Stevie Van Zandt
- Opening theme: "Lilyhammer Nocturne"
- Composers: Frans Bak (season 1); Steven Van Zandt
- Countries of origin: Norway; United States
- Original languages: English; Norwegian
- No. of seasons: 3
- No. of episodes: 24

Production
- Executive producers: Steven Van Zandt; Lasse Hallberg
- Producers: Agnete Thuland; Trond Berg-Nilsen; Anders Tangen
- Production locations: Lillehammer; New York metro area Rio de Janeiro
- Cinematography: Johan-Fredrik Bødtker; Jakob Ingimundarson
- Running time: 43–58 minutes
- Production companies: Rubicon TV; Renegade TV

Original release
- Network: NRK1 (Norway); Netflix (United States)
- Release: 25 January 2012 – 17 December 2014

Lilyhammer is a crime comedy-drama television series starring Steven Van Zandt about a former New York–based gangster named Frank "The Fixer" Tagliano trying to start a new life in isolated Lillehammer, Norway. The first season premiered on Norwegian NRK1 on 25 January 2012 with a record audience of 998,000 viewers (one fifth of Norway's population), and premiered on Netflix in North America on 6 February 2012, with all eight episodes available in full for streaming on the service. Lilyhammer was promoted as "the first time Netflix offered exclusive content".

The spelling of the series title alludes to Tagliano's dog Lily, killed in the first episode during an attempt on Tagliano's life, and the way that Tagliano and some other Americans pronounce the town's name. The series produced three seasons; the final episode aired 17 December 2014. On 22 July 2015, Van Zandt posted on Twitter that the series had been cancelled, and the following day Netflix confirmed that they were pulling out.

Van Zandt's character Frank Tagliano draws parallels with his character Silvio Dante from the HBO series The Sopranos. They are meant to be different, but most traits are the same between the two.

== Synopsis ==
=== Season 1 ===
Frank Tagliano (Steven Van Zandt), a former underboss from New York City in an American Mafia crime family, is placed in the Federal Witness Protection Program after testifying in a trial against Aldo Delucci (Thomas Grube), the new Mafia head who had ordered a hit on him after succeeding his recently deceased brother, Sally Boy Delucci. Frank requests that he be relocated to Lillehammer, where he believes no one will look for him. His new identity is Norwegian-American immigrant Giovanni "Johnny" Henriksen. On a train journey from Oslo to Lillehammer, Johnny impresses teacher Sigrid Haugli (Marian Saastad Ottesen), her son Jonas (Mikael Aksnes-Pehrson), and a man who later turns out to be a civil supervisor. Johnny befriends the Hauglis after doing them a favor, and sometime later, after he and Sigrid spend the night together, Sigrid learns she is pregnant with his twins.

After a wolf kills Jonas's lamb, and the locals complain that authorities are doing nothing about it, and citizens are prohibited from killing wildlife, Johnny enlists his new friends, brothers Torgeir (Trond Fausa Aurvåg) and Roar Lien (Steinar Sagen), to help him hunt the predator. After killing the wolf and hiding its carcass "mob-style" (by wrapping it in a tarp, weighting down the body, and dropping it into an open fishing hole in an ice lake) the hunters hide in a cabin owned by Jan Johansen (Fridtjov Såheim), a local NAV worker with whom Johnny has developed a frictional relationship, and Johnny blackmails him with naked photos of underage girls Johnny took from the cabin.

The supervisor, who heard shots and saw the Lien brothers in the woods the night Johnny killed the wolf, reported them to the police. However, when Johnny's neighbour, police chief Laila Hovland (Anne Krigsvoll), and police officer Geir Tvedt (Kyrre Hellum) question the trio, the supervisor— remembering Johnny's favor on the train—says he misidentified the Lien brothers and the hunters he saw must have been youth from Oslo.

Hovland and Tvedt become suspicious of Johnny when Johnny opens the Flamingo nightclub. When the local biker gang attempts to start a war with Johnny, Johnny hires the gang to deliver the club's alcohol supply. Johnny invests in an apartment complex and is promised his own penthouse. Johnny is told the apartments are meant for families, and he schemes his way out of the deal, making a profit. Meanwhile, Geir edits a photo of Johnny to make Johnny appear to be a terrorist and presents the photo to Laila, who dismisses it. Geir is later suspended after he mistakes a toy gun Johnny is holding for a real gun during a local ski race and interrupts the race to tackle Johnny. Laila gives Geir the gift of a trip to Graceland in Memphis to visit the home of Geir's idol, Elvis. While stopped in New York, Geir learns that Johnny bears a similarity to vanished criminal Frank Tagliano and attempts to investigate.

In New York, Geir befriends a transsexual woman who uses her knowledge of underworld hangouts to show Geir where Geir might collect information about Johnny. Aldo learns of Geir's appearance and sends hitman Robert Grasso (Tim Ahern) and Aldo's nephew Jerry (Greg Canestrari) to interrogate Geir and find information regarding Frank's location. While being interrogated, Geir attacks his captors but is shot and killed in the struggle. When Aldo learns that Geir was from Lillehammer, he sends Robert and Jerry to Norway. Meanwhile, in Lillehammer, Johnny purchases a penthouse and invites Sigrid and Jonas to move in. When a mysterious beating occurs, Laila finds a connection between Johnny and the beating. Torgeir – who previously remarked upon Johnny's unusual knowledge of guns for a restaurant owner – informs Johnny of the hitmen and becomes curious about Johnny's true identity. When Torgeir later confronts Johnny, Johnny lies and says he is a CIA agent wanted by the criminals from his past.

Robert and Jerry kidnap Jonas, and Johnny gives chase through a nearby amusement park. Jonas manages to escape, and Robert kills Jerry. Johnny makes a deal with Robert, providing his ring as evidence for Aldo, in New York, that Johnny died in a mutually fatal shootout with Jerry. Laila discovers the two burying Jerry's body, but allows them to go after learning that Jerry was responsible for Geir's death. When Sigrid learns of Jonas's abduction, she breaks up with Johnny.

=== Season 2 ===
Eight months later, British thief Duncan Hammer (Paul Kaye) arrives in Lillehammer, looking to sell a Ferrari through car salesman Dag. However, Dag owes money to Johnny and his crew, which now includes the bikers and Jan. When Johnny and Torgeir capture Dag, Torgeir, Roar, Arne (Tommy Karlsen Sandum), and Roy, the leader of the biker gang, "borrow" the Ferrari and film themselves speeding across Lillehammer's longest bridge. On the way, they hit a moose and destroy the car. Jan learns that his old fling Randi (Henriette Steenstrup) is in charge of the refugee centre and blackmails her into selling Johnny a partnership in the centre, at one-tenth its market value. Johnny and Sigrid's twins are christened. When Duncan interrogates Dag about the gang's location, he corners Torgeir in the Flamingo. Before Duncan can kill them, Torgeir stabs him through the throat with a knitting needle, and the Flamingo gang hires Arne to dispose of the body.

Johnny relocates Indian IT employee Gareth to Lillehammer, to become his crew's hacker. African refugee Balotelli (Momodou Lamin Touray) is about to be deported back to Africa, but Jan and Johnny intervene and employ Balotelli as the Flamingo's head chef. Duncan's brother Tony (Tony Pitts) and uncle Terry (Alan Ford) arrive in Lillehammer to find Duncan. Tony and Terry kidnap Roar and hold him for ransom. Johnny and Torgeir lure the gangsters to an ice lake, where they rescue Roar and leave Tony and Terry to freeze to death.

Johnny wins Citizen of the Year, and Torgeir befriends local millionaire Lars Olafsen (Henrik Mestad). Lars becomes an investor in the Flamingo and convinces Johnny to fire Torgeir. Reluctantly, Johnny agrees and fires him. However, he later re-hires Torgeir and cuts Lars out of the club's future investments. Meanwhile, a bank robbery in Oslo results in the thieves' stealing files on Johnny's relocation. Laila moves to Oslo and becomes a successful writer. She is replaced by Mette Hansen (Silje Torp Færavaag), who sleeps with Torgeir and leads a raid on the Flamingo. Johnny hires his old friend, criminal Thomas Aune (Kyrre Haugen Sydness), to help him track down the thieves.

Torgeir and Roar's mother, Belinda (Maylen Feragen), leaves a religious cult and returns home. Belinda's boyfriend from the cult, Swedish gangster Stanley Olsson (Johannes Brost), proposes to her and makes Johnny his best man and Roar his toastmaster. Torgeir and Roar hold a bachelor party for Stanley at the club, but Stanley begins to mistreat the dancers. The brothers kick him out of the club and leave him to wander home by himself. The next morning, Torgeir and Roar learn Stanley had raped their neighbor's sheep. They tell Johnny, who has Stanley abducted and sent back to Sweden. During Jan's birthday party, Randi walks in and finds him flirting with the dancers. She leaves and files a report on the refugee centre and herself, causing it to close down.

The crew tracks down the thieves, only to learn that Thomas and his friend are working with them. Johnny's crew raids the thieves' hideout and takes the stolen items from the heist. Johnny locks up his relocation file in his safe, and he gives the stolen jewelry to Hansen. In turn, Hansen returns the items to the bank, becomes a national hero, and gets a promotion to Oslo. Thomas, now aware of Johnny's past, goes to New York, where he plans to sell the information to Delucci. When a farmer owes money to Johnny, he promises Johnny's crew a reindeer herd. Johnny's crew plans to create an avalanche and collect insurance money, but Torgeir backs out because he did not want to harm the innocent animals, and the plan is ruined.

Johnny and Sigrid's twins begin at a local kindergarten, and Johnny falls for their teacher, Tiril (Viktoria Winge). However, Tiril says that relationships between teachers and parents are forbidden, so Johnny enrolls his children in another school. After hearing how Tiril's grandfather raced reindeer in the north, Johnny decides to bring reindeer racing to Lillehammer. Johnny informs Lars of the idea, and they begin promoting the reindeer race. In New York, Robert learns of Thomas's presence and kills him and his accomplice. Jan returns to the refugee centre and tells Randi to rescind the complaint report. Randi refuses, and Jan pushes her into a wall, accidentally killing her.

Having discovered Randi's body and suspecting Jan, Johnny meets with him, and Jan confesses. Johnny advises Jan to disappear somewhere that he couldn't possibly be found, prompting Jan to emigrate to Iraq through his connections. Robert appears in Lillehammer and tells Johnny to return to New York to kill Delucci. Johnny, Torgeir, Roar, and Arne pose as Norwegian tour guides and sneak into a party held by Delucci in his home. On the balcony, they corner and shoot Delucci before pushing him to the street below. During a boat ride to the Statue of Liberty, Torgeir finds out that he won the lead in a local tribute to Glee, and the group returns to Lillehammer. Eight months later, the reindeer race is a success. Johnny and his friends watch from a rooftop and Johnny embraces his twin infants.

=== Season 3 ===
The third season begins with Torgeir and Roar visiting Rio de Janeiro so that Roar can meet Alex, a woman he met online. Roar falls head over heels for her and the two plan to be married. Back in Lillehammer, Johnny gazes out of his window at a Norwegian holiday festival with costumed participants, including a boy in a tiger costume, in the street below. Johnny looks towards a window across the way and spies a beautiful blonde girl dressed in a cheerleader costume. A man approaches her from behind in what appears to be the beginnings of a lovemaking session but suddenly the man strikes the woman.

Johnny runs downstairs, sprints across the street, and attempts to enter the building where the violence is taking place. The glass front doors are locked, and a dismissive clerk inside mouths, "We're closed", through the glass. Johnny breaks through the glass, grabs keys, and rushes up to where the woman is being beaten. He bursts into the room and drags the man off the woman. A one-armed woman enters behind Johnny and promptly shoots him.

Shot and bleeding, Johnny staggers back down to the snow-covered street where he collapses and hallucinates that a tiger is approaching him. When he regains consciousness he is in a hospital bed. In Rio, Torgeir learns of this and returns to Norway, unable to be Roar's Best Man. The bride's brother, Oscarito, takes his place. On the day of the wedding Oscarito asks Roar to "perform a small favor" for him – transporting two gym bags to the yacht where the wedding is to take place. Overcoming his reluctance, Roar agrees in order to win favor with his bride's brother. Unbeknownst to Roar, the bags contain cocaine, and Roar and Oscarito are arrested and thrown into jail.

As Johnny recovers from his gunshot wounds, he befriends a young autistic boy. The boy, now recognized as the tiger boy from earlier, is quiet and reclusive, but Johnny is able to communicate with him through their shared love for old-school gangster movies such as Angels with Dirty Faces. The boy possesses an encyclopedic memory and builds a gingerbread display with the getaway car of the woman that shot him, displaying the exact license plate number of the car. Johnny then hires former Police Chief Laila Hovland as a Personal Investigator to find the people that shot him.

Johnny's associate Dag has a Christmas tree delivery business that doesn't pan out. Wearing a diving suit, he intentionally drives the truck carrying the trees into a lake to collect the insurance. Also in the truck is the plastic wrap used to dispose of Randi's body. Laila is an investigator for the insurance company and the police get surveillance video of Dag in a dry suit in his truck. Dag realizes his predicament and goes back to the truck wreckage to recover the plastic wrap (which would implicate Johnny and his crew). While diving to get the wrap, Dag accidentally cuts his oxygen line and ends up in a coma. Jan Johansen returns from Iraq and confesses to the murder of his former lover Randi. Having converted to Islam and having taken a new Islamic name, Jan goes to prison and suffers the ire of former Lillehammer citizens he tormented while a government bureaucrat. In prison, Jan undergoes hypnosis therapy and contrives a story in which Dag murdered Randi, framing Dag for the murder while Dag is in a coma.

Johnny recovers from his injuries and tends to Roar's situation. He meets with the Norwegian Foreign Minister to have Roar freed from the prison in Brazil. The Foreign Minister also juggles a situation with a beached whale and local environmental activists. When he joins Johnny and Torgeir in Rio, protesters prevent the minister from meeting with a Brazilian official that could help to release Roar. Johnny later drugs the minister's water while he practices roller skiing in Rio and blackmails him to release Roar. Once the whale is returned to the ocean, the Brazilian official meets with Johnny and the foreign minister. Johnny uses his American-style negotiating skills, parlaying purchases for a rainforest fund in exchange for Roar's release.

While in prison, Roar gets into a fight with a known telenovela filmmaker and another inmate. This results in Oscarito getting stabbed. While Roar is still in prison, Johnny begins an affair with Roar's fiancée Alex. Once Johnny secures his release, the three return to Lillehammer with Alex remaining in Rio. Once they return to Lillehammer, Johnny deals with those that shot him earlier. However, during Johnny's time in Rio, Roy and Laila investigate massage parlors owned by Lithuanians. While Roy, Arne, and another associate are receiving massages, the Lithuanians discover their association with Johnny and the three escape half-naked. When they hide out at the Flamingo, the Lithuanian man Johnny witnessed abusing the woman comes in and throws a Molotov cocktail into the Flamingo, thus severely burning Johnny's club. When Johnny returns to his business, he's angry and sucker punches Roy.

Johnny tracks down and hires the woman beaten in the first episode, and uses her in a gambit to abduct the Lithuanians that shot him. Once they do, they take the three Lithuanians to a farm where they plan on shipping them back to Lithuania. While marching the three to a car, Torgeir accidentally shoots the one-armed woman with a flare gun. The other two happily return to Lithuania.

While the Flamingo is being repaired, Torgeir falls in love with contractor Birgitte. Torgeir tries to get selected to perform a ski jump honoring the anniversary of the 1994 Winter Olympics, and Johnny negotiates this for him. Torgeir performs the jump perfectly, and overcomes his previous failures – an injury he suffered in 1994 that kept him from performing in the games that year.

Johnny starts a wine business using Israeli grapes, which draws protests from pro-Palestine activists. Johnny has his crew intimidate the main activist into dropping the protests by imitating Mossad. A New York mob associate finds himself in need of Johnny's assistance after a failed hit on a man touring the world talking about healthy Italian food, ordered by the boss in New York. This man, Tommy, enjoys Frank's small crew and setup in Lillehammer and attempts to extort local citizens and kick up to Johnny. Tommy throws a party at the Flamingo that Johnny doesn't approve of, and cracks form between the two. Tommy splits from Johnny and tries to form his own crew. Meanwhile, Alex comes to Lillehammer from Rio to unite with Johnny and splits with Roar.

Roar had returned to Rio at the behest of the telenovela director he met in the Rio prison. Acting in a telenovela, he became a small star in Brazil. However, he is accosted by favela criminals whose cocaine he and Oscarito misplaced. Meanwhile, Torgeir experiences hallucinations of Duncan Hammer from S2. Hammer appears to Torgeir while he's involved with Birgitte, leading to some problems between the two especially now that Birgitte found she was pregnant with Torgeir's child. This leads to total dissociation from Torgeir, hallucinating that he himself is Hammer. He goes on a rampage, getting in fights and vandalizing businesses before being knocked out and sent to the hospital. The hospital discovers he was suffering from a blood clot in his brain, and dissolves the clot. Torgeir then stops having hallucinations and comes to terms with his killing of Hammer. He decides to leave Lillehammer and Johnny's crew to raise his child with Birgitte.

Once the police believe that Jan falsely confessed to the murder, he is released from prison and gets his old job back at the NAV. He goes to a seminar, meets another woman and starts a relationship with her. They have sex while she is driving and she hits and kills Sigrid's father. When Johnny consoles Sigrid over her loss, Alex decides to split with Johnny at Roar's suggestion. Alex begins a relationship with Tommy, and Tommy forms his small crew.

Things come to a head when Tommy's crew conflicts with Johnny's. A hitman sent by Tommy's boss in New York kills Tommy. Roar returns to Johnny and his brother, and Alex goes back to Brazil. Johnny tracks down the car that killed Sigrid's father and traces it to Jan's cabin where he and his lover are staying. Johnny figures out Jan was somehow behind Sigrid's father's death, and decides to kill Jan once and for all. With the rest of the loose ends tied up, the season was completed.

In the last episode, Bruce Springsteen makes a cameo appearance as Frank's other brother, working as an undertaker in New York.

== Cast and characters ==
- Steven Van Zandt as Frank Tagliano / Giovanni "Johnny" Henriksen. Johnny is a former underboss in a New York organized crime family who enters the FBI's witness protection program and moves to Norway with a new identity.
- Trond Fausa Aurvåg as Torgeir Lien, Giovanni's friend and business partner. Torgeir was once a competitive ski-jumper and had aspirations during the 1994 Winter Games in Lillehammer. Johnny meets the now-unemployed Torgeir in a training program for job-seekers offered by the state welfare agency.
- Steinar Sagen as Roar Lien, a local taxi driver and Torgeir's brother.
- Marian Saastad Ottesen as Sigrid Haugli, a Norwegian language teacher who has recently moved back from Oslo with her young son to live with her father Sylfest Haugli (Viggo Sandvik) on the family farm.
- Mikael Aksnes-Pehrson as Sigrid's son Jonas Haugli.
- Fridtjov Såheim as the NAV worker Jan Johansen, a social worker at the state welfare agency who is assigned to assist Johnny with adjusting to life as an immigrant in Norway. Jan appears to be a by-the-book bureaucratic stickler who particularly enjoys coming up with cultural activities to help acclimatize new immigrants to living in Norway.
- Anne Krigsvoll as lensmann (chief of police) Laila Hovland and Johnny's next-door neighbor.
- Robert Skjærstad as Roy "Fingern" Aass, the owner of a tattoo parlor and leader of a local outlaw biker gang involved in trafficking contraband as well as other illegal activities.
- Tommy Karlsen Sandum as Arne, a large and imposing member of Roy's biker gang
- Nils Jørgen Kaalstad as Dag Solstad, an employee of the local office of the automobile authority who is assigned to be Johnny's driving instructor. It is of surprise to most of the locals that short and round Dag has a tall, beautiful wife, Yvonne Solstad (Tina Hovi).
- Finn Schau as politimester (chief constable) Arve Østli, a senior official of the local police department and Laila Hovland's superior officer.
- Kyrre Hellum (season 1) as the police officer Geir "Elvis" Tvedt, a subordinate of Laila Holland who takes a particular interest in Johnny's activities, suspecting him to be an Arab terrorist. In his free time, Geir is an aspiring musical performer.
- Øyvind Blomstrøm (season 1), bass guitarist in El Cuero and drummer Svein Åge Lillehamre of the Lucky Bullets, who appear as backing musicians for (Kyrre Hellum's) Elvis cover-band in multiple episodes
- Sven Nordin (season 1) as Julius Bakke, a local lawyer with a checkered background who first appears as the legal counsel for Roy and Marianne Aass (a tattoo artist working for Roy).
- Harald Sørlie (season 1) as Baby Shop manager
- Beate Eriksen (season 1) as Arne's striking mother
- Jay Benedict (season 1) as FBI Agent Becker
- Ingrid Olava (season 1) as herself, playing the piano at the Flamingo at the end of the first-season finale
- Thomas Grube (seasons 1–2) as Aldo Delucci, a newly promoted Mafia boss who comes into conflict with Tagliano
- Greg Canestrari (season 1) as Aldo Delucci's nephew Jerry Delucci
- Tim Ahern (seasons 1–2) as Robert Grasso, an associate of Aldo Delucci who is assigned to go to Norway with Jerry Delucci
- Kyrre Haugen Sydness (seasons 1–2) as Thomas Aune
- Henriette Steenstrup (season 2) as Randi
- Pål Espen Kilstad (season 2) as Trond
- Erik Madsen (season 2)
- Amy Beth Hayes (season 2)
- Amit Shah (season 2) as Gareth, a Packard Bell call center employee, whom Frank hires to be his hacker
- Richard Skog (season 2) as Odjobb, Frank's bodyguard
- Silje Torp (season 2) as Mette Hansen
- Tony Pitts (season 2) as Duncan's brother, Tony Hammer, an organized crime leader from England
- Alan Ford (seasons 2–3) as Terence ("Terry"), a British gangster claiming to be from Scotland Yard
- Paul Kaye (seasons 2–3) as Duncan Hammer, a dangerous Englishman who comes to Lillehammer to sell an expensive car
- Jakob Oftebro (seasons 2–3) as Chris, an instructor of swimming exercises for mothers with infant children who becomes interested in Sigrid
- Maureen Van Zandt (seasons 2–3) as Ange, Frank's friend in New York
- Tony Sirico (seasons 2–3) as Tony Tagliano, Frank's brother and church priest
- Bruce Springsteen (season 3) as Giuseppe Tagliano, Frank's brother who's an undertaker and semi-retired hitman
- Rhys Coiro (season 3) as Tommy Mangano, a hitman sent to Norway to confront Joey Salmone, who goes to Lillehammer to seek Johnny's help after he is injured
- Ida Elise Broch (season 3) as Birgitte
- Maria Joana Chiappetta (season 3) as Alex, a young Brazilian woman living in a favela in Rio de Janeiro who begins an online relationship with Roar
- Michael Badalucco (season 3) as Joey Salmone, the author of a cookbook focusing on the cuisine of the Mafiosi, whose use of certain recipes puts him in conflict with some of his former associates
- Farack Abbas as Rashid, gang leader
- Angelina Jordan (season 3) as a young jazz singer in Frank's bar

== Production ==
The first series was shot on location during 2011, with post-production finishing in November. Originally intended to air on NRK1 beginning on 1 January 2012, the Norwegian debut was put on hold because of a conflict between NRK1 and the producers about product placements, which were illegal at the time under Norwegian law. The series premiered in Norway on 25 January 2012. It was commissioned by NRK1 from Norwegian Rubicon TV AS, in association with Netflix and German-owned distributor Red Arrow International.

The second season was filmed on location both in Norway and New York City during the first four months of 2013. Production was delayed due to Van Zandt's schedule with Bruce Springsteen and the E Street Band's Wrecking Ball World Tour. Van Zandt was replaced on the Australian leg of the tour by guitarist Tom Morello so that filming could proceed.

In an interview with Rolling Stone magazine, Van Zandt announced he had signed on for a third season of the show. Filming began 3 January 2014, with Netflix remaining the exclusive American broadcaster. The season was shot on location in Lillehammer, Lofoten, and Oslo in Norway, New York City, and Rio de Janeiro. It premiered 21 November 2014, on both NRK1 and Netflix.

According to Rolling Stone, Van Zandt was responsible for most of the show's musical soundtrack: "I did the whole score myself for free. I did it from my own studio." In addition to being executive producer, writer, actor, and composer on the series, Van Zandt made his directorial debut with the season three finale.

== Episodes ==
=== Series overview ===
Season	Episodes	Originally aired	
Season	Episodes	First aired	Last aired
1	8	25 January 2012	14 March 2012
2	8	23 October 2013	11 December 2013
3	8	29 October 2014	17 December 2014

=== Season 1 (2012) ===
No. overall	No. in series	Title	Directed by	Written by	Original release date	Norway viewers (millions)
1	1	"Reality Check"	Simen Alsvik	Anne Bjørnstad, Eilif Skodvin & Steven Van Zandt	25 January 2012	0.998
After being targeted by mob boss Aldo Delucci, Frank "the Fixer" Tagliano testifies against the mob and is relocated to Norway as part of his deal. Becoming the Norwegian citizen "Giovanni 'Johnny' Henriksen", he soon meets his new neighbor, the chief of police, and clashes with his new country's bureaucratic culture.
2	2	"The Flamingo"	Simen Alsvik	Anne Bjørnstad, Eilif Skodvin & Steven Van Zandt	1 February 2012	1.024
Frank falls for his language teacher Sigrid and opens a nightclub that's a big hit, but he draws unwanted attention from the police and a biker gang.
3	3	"Guantanamo Blues"	Geir Henning Hopland	Anne Bjørnstad, Eilif Skodvin & Steven Van Zandt	8 February 2012	1.073
Now a successful local businessman, Frank joins a lucrative real estate deal, but his plans are thwarted by the police, who believe he is a terrorist.
4	4	"The Midwife"	Geir Henning Hopland	Anne Bjørnstad, Eilif Skodvin & Steven Van Zandt	15 February 2012	0.993
Sigrid learns some surprising news, Frank's deal sours when his partner's son converts to Islam, and Geir stumbles onto a clue to Frank's identity.
5	5	"My Kind of Town"	Lisa Marie Gamlem	Anne Bjørnstad, Eilif Skodvin & Steven Van Zandt	22 February 2012	1.077
Frank has a fight over a baby carriage and makes a deal to exit his real estate investment. Frank's enemies get an unexpected lead on his location.
6	6	"Pack Your Lederhosen"	Lisa Marie Gamlem	Anne Bjørnstad, Eilif Skodvin & Steven Van Zandt	29 February 2012	0.918
Flush with cash, Frank buys a new penthouse and invites Sigrid and Jonas to move in, while Geir's colleagues get bad news, and Mafia hitmen arrive in Norway.
7	7	"The Babysitter"	Geir Henning Hopland	Anne Bjørnstad, Eilif Skodvin & Steven Van Zandt	7 March 2012	1.023
The police chief suspects Frank is the link between a murder and a mysterious beating; Frank beefs up security when he learns he's in jeopardy.
8	8	"Trolls"	Geir Henning Hopland	Anne Bjørnstad, Eilif Skodvin & Steven Van Zandt	14 March 2012	0.967
Frank's attempt to rescue Sigrid's son leads to a spectacular shootout and a series of shocking revelations that change both his old and new lives.

=== Season 2 (2013) ===
No. overall	No. in series	Title	Directed by	Written by	Original release date	Norway viewers (millions)
9	1	"Millwall Brick"	Simen Alsvik	Eilif Skodvin, Steven Van Zandt & Helena Nielsen	23 October 2013	0.922
Torgeir's mishap with a moose and a Ferrari enrages a British thief. Frank is alarmed by his twins' proposed names. Jan makes a sweet business deal.
10	2	"Out of Africa"	Simen Alsvik	Eilif Skodvin, Steven Van Zandt & Jadranko Mehic	30 October 2013	0.868
Frank gets involved in immigration by sponsoring a computer hacker's relocation to Norway and protecting a local African emigre who's a gifted chef.
11	3	"Fiddler's Green"	Ole Endresen	Eilif Skodvin, Steven Van Zandt & Thomas H. Solli	6 November 2013	0.782
Frank's crew has a showdown with a family of vengeful British gangsters. Sigrid takes a trip and leaves the twins with their ill-prepared father.
12	4	"The Black Toe"	Ole Endresen	Eilif Skodvin, Steven Van Zandt & Jadranko Mehic	13 November 2013	N/A
Frank wins a Citizen of the Year Award and competes for financing from an investors' circle. A bank robbery has an unexpected connection to Frank.
13	5	"The Island"	Ole Endresen	Eilif Skodvin, Steven Van Zandt & Helena Nielsen	20 November 2013	N/A
Frank goes undercover in Oslo to find the masked thieves who stole his valuables. Torgeir and Roar's mother returns home carrying some baggage.
14	6	"Special Education"	Geir Henning Hopland	Eilif Skodvin, Steven Van Zandt & Thomas H. Solli	27 November 2013	N/A
Frank turns the tables on some blackmailing thieves. Roar and Torgeir realize their mother's boyfriend isn't the stepfather they were hoping for.
15	7	"The Freezer"	Geir Henning Hopland	Eilif Skodvin, Steven Van Zandt & Thomas H. Solli	4 December 2013	N/A
A farmer pays his debt with the deed to a reindeer herd, giving Frank a business idea. Frank meets a new love interest. Jan must flee the country.
16	8	"Ghosts"	Geir Henning Hopland	Eilif Skodvin, Steven Van Zandt & Jadranko Mehic	11 December 2013	N/A
A familiar face from the old days shows up in Norway, forcing Frank to return to his New York roots for two very different types of family reunions.

=== Season 3 (2014) ===
No. overall	No. in series	Title	Directed by	Written by	Original release date	Norway viewers (millions)
17	1	"Tiger Boy"	Simen Alsvik	Eilif Skodvin, Anne Bjørnstad, Steven Van Zandt & Jadranko Mehic	29 October 2014	0.663
It's New Year's Eve in Lillehammer, and Frank is getting ready to party. Through the window, he discovers a young woman in need and decides to come to the rescue. But soon it's Frank who needs help. And that help comes from a mysterious young boy dressed in a tiger costume.
18	2	"Foreign Affairs"	Simen Alsvik	Eilif Skodvin, Anne Bjørnstad, Steven Van Zandt & Tomas H. Solli	5 November 2014	0.563
Roar has messed up in the criminal environment in Brazil. Frank and Torgeir drop everything and soon contend with both the Norwegian diplomacy and Brazilian judicial systems. (The part of the plot that takes place in Vesterålen was actually filmed at Henningsvær in Lofoten.)
19	3	"The Homecoming"	Øystein Karlsen	Eilif Skodvin, Anne Bjørnstad, Steven Van Zandt & Jadranko Mehic	12 November 2014	N/A
Frank and Torgeir are happy to have gotten Roar of the Brazilian jail, but back home in Lillehammer the Lithuanian gang make trouble. From now on Frank shuns no means to get the gang who shot him on New Year's Eve.
20	4	"The Mind Is Like A Monkey"	Øystein Karlsen	Eilif Skodvin, Anne Bjørnstad, Steven Van Zandt & Tomas H. Solli	19 November 2014	N/A
It is the 20th anniversary of the Lillehammer Olympics, and Torgeir gets to fulfill his longheld dream: to jump during the opening ceremony. But does he really have the nerves to carry it out?
21	5	"Tommy"	Øystein Karlsen	Eilif Skodvin, Anne Bjørnstad, Steven Van Zandt & Jadranko Mehic	26 November 2014	N/A
An ex-mafioso on a book tour in Scandinavia becomes the target of an assassination attempt, and soon Frank receives a bloody visitor at his club.
22	6	"The Minstrel Boy"	Tuva Novotny	Eilif Skodvin, Anne Bjørnstad, Steven Van Zandt & Tomas H. Solli	3 December 2014	N/A
Frank appreciates having a powerful mafia guy like Tommy in the gang. But Tommy goes behind Frank's back to boost his earnings.
23	7	"The Funeral"	Øystein Karlsen	Anne Bjørnstad, Eilif Skodvin, Steven Van Zandt & Jadranko Mehic	10 December 2014	N/A
Tommy has left the Flamingo and settled down as a DJ in a nightclub in Hafjell. He executes a plan to become one of the owners. Everything goes brilliantly, until Frank gets wind of how Tommy has defied Frank's orders and gone no further than the neighboring community.
24	8	"Loose Ends"	Steven Van Zandt	Steven Van Zandt, Eilif Skodvin, Anne Bjørnstad, & Tomas H. Solli	17 December 2014	N/A
Frank cannot allow Tommy to establish himself in the neighboring community, but Tommy is unwilling to let Frank dictate to him. The tone further hardens when Frank and Torgeir meet the latest addition to Tommy's gang.

== Broadcast ==
Lilyhammer premiered in Norway on 25 January 2012. On 6 February 2012, the show began streaming on Netflix in Canada and the United States. From 11 September 2012, it was transmitted on BBC Four in the United Kingdom. The series was bought by SBS in Australia. The series has been sold to over 130 countries worldwide. On 22 July 2015, Steven Van Zandt posted on Twitter that the series had been cancelled, and the following day Netflix confirmed that they were pulling out. NRK, who owns the rights to the series, remained optimistic that a deal could be made with another company for a fourth season.

Netflix was slated to lose the series in full in November 2022, but an agreement was reached to extend the streaming arrangement for an additional seven years, through November 2029.

== Awards ==
- Gullruten 2014 for Best TV Drama
