= Toons Mag =

Cartoon magazine in Norway

- Categories: Cartoon, Magazine, Online newspaper
- Publisher: Arifur Rahman
- Founder: Arifur Rahman
- Founded: 2009
- First issue: 1 November 2009; 15 years ago
- Country: Norway
- Based in: Drøbak
- Language: English, Bengali, Hindi, Spanish, Arabic
- Website: toonsmag.com
- ISSN: 2535-7492

Toons Mag is a cartoon magazine that offers a global online platform for publishing editorial cartoons, comics, caricatures, illustrations, and related news. It is a multilingual publication and organizer of an international cartoon contest and exhibitions. It was founded in 2009 by cartoonist Arifur Rahman, based in Drøbak, Norway.

== Founder and history ==
In 2007, Cartoonist Arifur Rahman started drawing for a Bangladeshi satirical magazine called Alpin. It was a fun supplementary publication by Prothom Alo.

In Alpin, one of his cartoons that made a joke about adding Mohammad to the beginning of a person's name. The cartoon culminates in a young boy introducing his cat as Mohammad Cat. The cartoon, which was published during the Islamic holiday of Ramadan, ignited protests across Bangladesh and led to Arifur Rahman's arrest.

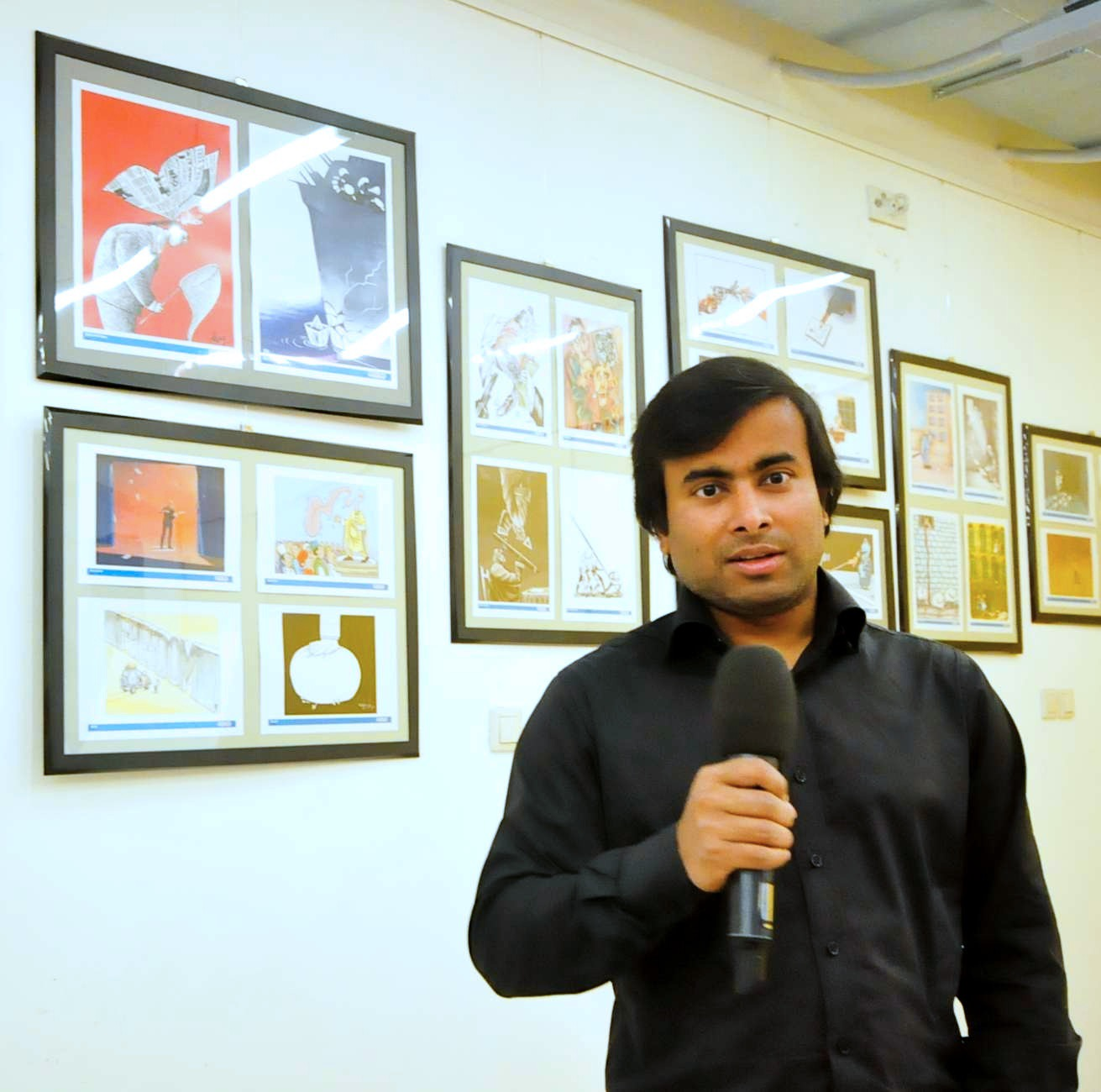
Arifur Rahman, Founder and Publisher of Toons Mag.

On 18 September 2007, Alpin was banned permanently and the editor of Alpin was suspended. Bangladeshi newspaper editors decided that they will never be published his cartoons in the future. In prison, Arifur Rahman wished that when he was freed, he would be able to start a magazine like Alpin. On 20 March 2008, after six months and two days in prison for "hurting religious sentiments," he was freed but found himself unable to publish his work.

One year later, some newspapers published his cartoons but all of them were published anonymously. Arifur Rahman was not happy to publish his cartoon anonymously. He always wished to publish his cartoons under his own name. So, he tried to start a printed cartoon magazine but did not have enough money. Then, he decided to publish on the internet, a cheap and easy way to get a global audience. In 2009, he started, Toons Mag Online Cartoon Magazine.

== Award ==
In 2015, Toons won "Best of online activism awards" in the people's choice category in Deutsche Welle, Germany.

Toons promotes freedom of expression through cartoons, comics, caricatures and articles. It is published in English, Bengali, Arabic, Spanish and Hindi languages.

== Cartoon Contest and Exhibitions ==
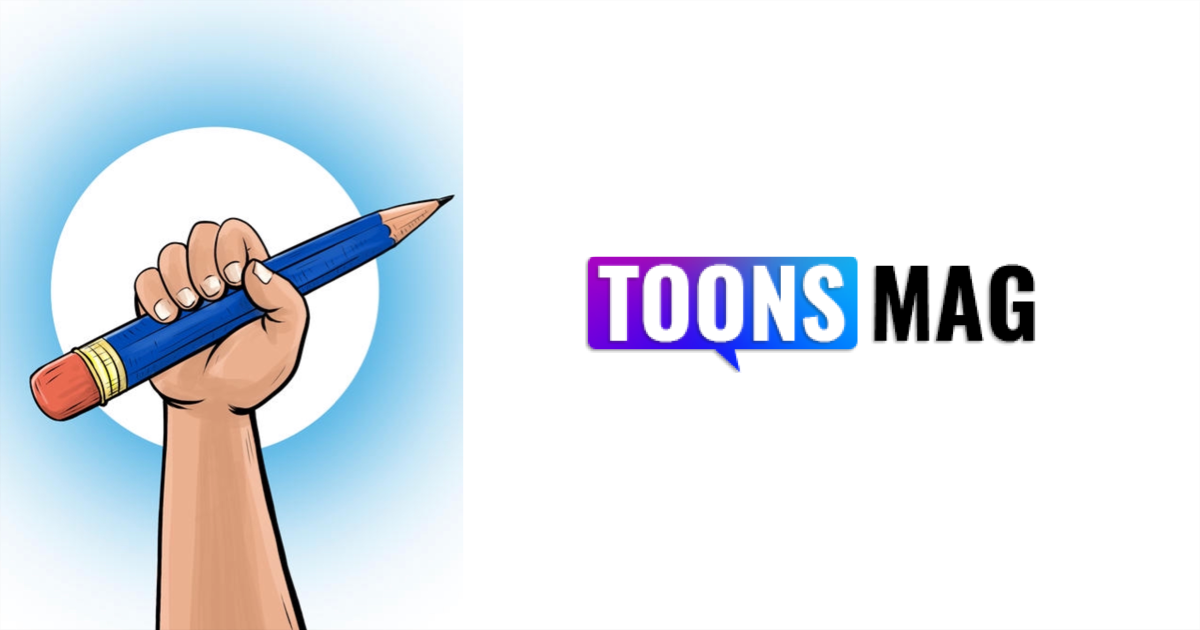
This is a press image about Freedom of cartooning. The image reflects that cartoonists are free to draw and publish at Toons Mag. This is a digitally produced graphic artwork. Free image.

Since 2015, Toons has organized the International Cartoon Contest and Exhibitions to support children's rights, women's rights, freedom of expression, gender equality.

=== 2015: Children in War ===
In 2015, Toons organized the International Cartoon Contest and Exhibition "Children in War" to focus on the suffering of children in war and conflict areas, such as in Syria, Yemen, Afghanistan, Iraq. It was a moving exhibition, which was exhibited in multiple places in Norway and Sweden. One hundred and twenty-eight cartoonists participated from 51 different countries. On 10 September 2015, The exhibition was opened by Bishop Atle Sommerfeldt in Avistegnernes Hus, Drøbak. After the opening, was exhibited in Oslo, Nesodden, Bergen, Stavanger, Haugesund, Kristiansand and in Norrköping in Sweden. The event was supported by The Norwegian Cartoonist Gallery and Fritt Ord.

=== 2016: Women's Rights ===
The cartoon competition was organized by Arifur Rahman and Toons Mag and received 1,625 drawings by 567 cartoonists from 79 different countries. A selection were represented in the Women's Rights exhibitions, which opened in Drøbak, Bangalore and Uttar Pradesh for International Women's Day, 8 March 2016. The drawings in the exhibitions deal with women's rights and limitations; the lack of education, forced marriage, female genital mutilation, violence, discrimination, legal protection and workload.

On 10 December 2016, it was exhibited in the Brain Sneezing Gallery in the Prešov Wave Club, Slovakia.

The event was supported by The Norwegian Cartoonist Gallery, Fritt Ord, Indian Institute of Cartoonist, Brain Sneezing Gallery, Prešov Wave club, EEA funds and the Slovak Republic.

Members of the Jury
| Name | Introduction | Country |
|---|---|---|
| Siri Dokken | Norwegian Cartoonist and Illustrator | Norway |
| Sabine Voigt | German Cartoonist and Illustrator | Germany |
| Saadet Demir Yalçın | Turkish Cartoonist | Turkey |
| Nigar Nazar | The first Pakistani female cartoonist. | Pakistan |
| Ahsan Habib | Bangladeshi Cartoonist and Editor of Unmad | Bangladesh |
| Borislav Stankovic | Serbian Cartoonist | Serbia |
| Jan-Erik Ander | Swedish Cartoonist and Illustrator | Sweden |
| Matt Wuerker | A Pulitzer Prize-winning American political cartoonist and founding staff member of Politico. | United States |

12 cartoonist was won the award out of 567 cartoonists.

The Winners
| Name | Country | Award |
|---|---|---|
| Marcin Bondarowicz | Poland | First Prize |
| Nenad Ostojic | Croatia | Second Prize |
| Reza Mokhtarjozani | United States | Third Prize |
| Zygmunt Zaradkiewicz | Poland | Honorable Mention |
| Zlatkovsky Mikhail | Russia | Honorable Mention |
| Osama Hajjaj | Jordan | Honorable Mention |
| Sahar Ajami | Iran | Honorable Mention |
| Sajad Rafeei | Iran | Honorable Mention |
| Selói Peters | Brazil | Honorable Mention |
| Afri Diyansyah | Indonesia | Honorable Mention |
| Michel Kichka | Israel | Honorable Mention |
| Plantu | France | Honorable Mention |

=== 2017: Freedom of Expression ===
This exhibition was organized in collaboration with cartoonist Arifur Rahman from Bangladesh, who has himself been a victim of torture and imprisonment for his drawings. Five hundred and eighteen cartoonists participated from 83 countries, submitting 1,556 cartoons.

The exhibition opening was in three countries. Per Edgard Kokkvold, writer, and chairman of the Norwegian Broadcasting Council, former newspaper editor and secretary general of the Norwegian Press Association and leader of the Press Complaints Commission inaugurated the exhibition. Moddi Knutsen, Norwegian musician, inaugurated the exhibition and Roar Hagen, Norwegian political cartoonist, announced the award winner.

In the Indian Institute of Cartoonists, Bangalore, India, Dr. Sathyabhama Badhreenath, director of the National Gallery of Modern Art inaugurated the exhibition.

It was also exhibited in Kýchanie mozgu – Brain Sneezing gallery, Prešov, and Košice, Slovakia, as well as in the Slovak embassy in Oslo, Norway.

The event was supported by The Norwegian Cartoonist Gallery, Fritt Ord, Norwegian Festival of Literature in Lillehammer, Brain Sneezing Gallery, Prešov, and Indian Institute of Cartoonist. Later on, it was exhibited on Eidsvoll.

Members of the Jury
| Name | Occupation | Country |
|---|---|---|
| Ann Telnaes | Winner of Pulitzer Prize for Editorial Cartooning. She is the president of the Association of American Editorial Cartoonists | United States |
| Liza Donnelly | An American cartoonist and writer, best known for her work in The New Yorker and is resident cartoonist of CBS News | United States |
| Roar Hagen | Norwegian cartoonist and illustrator, cartoonist for Norwegian Newspaper Verdens Gang (VG) | Norway |
| Egil Nyhus | Norwegian Cartoonist and illustrator, editorial cartoonist for Romerikes Blad | Norway |
| Carina Milde | Curator of Museum of Work, Sweden | Sweden |
| Nenad Ostojic | Croatian Cartoonist | Croatia |
| Cintia Bolio | Mexican Cartoonist and illustrator | México |
| Atiqullah Shahid | Afghan Cartoonist | Afghanistan |
| Judy Nadin | Australian cartoonist and caricaturist | Australia |
| John Curtis | South African Cartoonist | South Africa |

12 cartoonist was won the award out of 518 cartoonists.

The Winners
| Name | Country | Award |
|---|---|---|
| José Antonio Rodríguez García | Mexico | First Prize |
| Bruno Hamzagic | Brazil | Second Prize |
| Aristides E. Hernandez | Cuba | Third Prize |
| Miro Stefanović | Serbia | Honorable Mention |
| Angel Boligan | Mexico | Honorable Mention |
| Firuz Kutal | Norway | Honorable Mention |
| Galym Boranbayev | Kazakhstan | Honorable Mention |
| Walter Gastaldo | Argentina | Honorable Mention |
| Andrei Popov | Russia | Honorable Mention |
| Yihenew Worku | Ethiopia | Honorable Mention |
| Julio Carrión Cueva | Peru | Honorable Mention |
| Jitet Kustana | Indonesia | Honorable Mention |

== Cartoonist of the Year Award ==
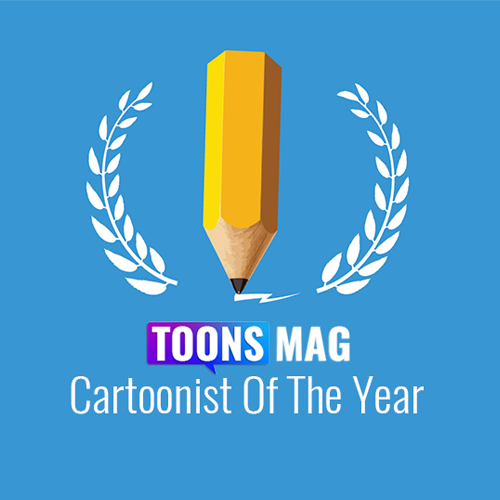
Cartoonist of the Year Award monogram

An annual award to appreciate and motivate cartoonists for their best cartoons.

Winners
| Year | Cartoonist | Country | Introduction |
|---|---|---|---|
| 2016/17 | José Antonio Rodríguez García | Mexico | Political Cartoonist and illustrator from Mexico |
| 2018 | Arcadio Esquivel | Costa Rica | Cartoonist and Professor of Department of Fine Arts at the School of General Studies, University of Costa Rica |
