= Arifur Rahman =

Bangladeshi-Norwegian political cartoonist, illustrator and animator

- আরিফুর রহমান
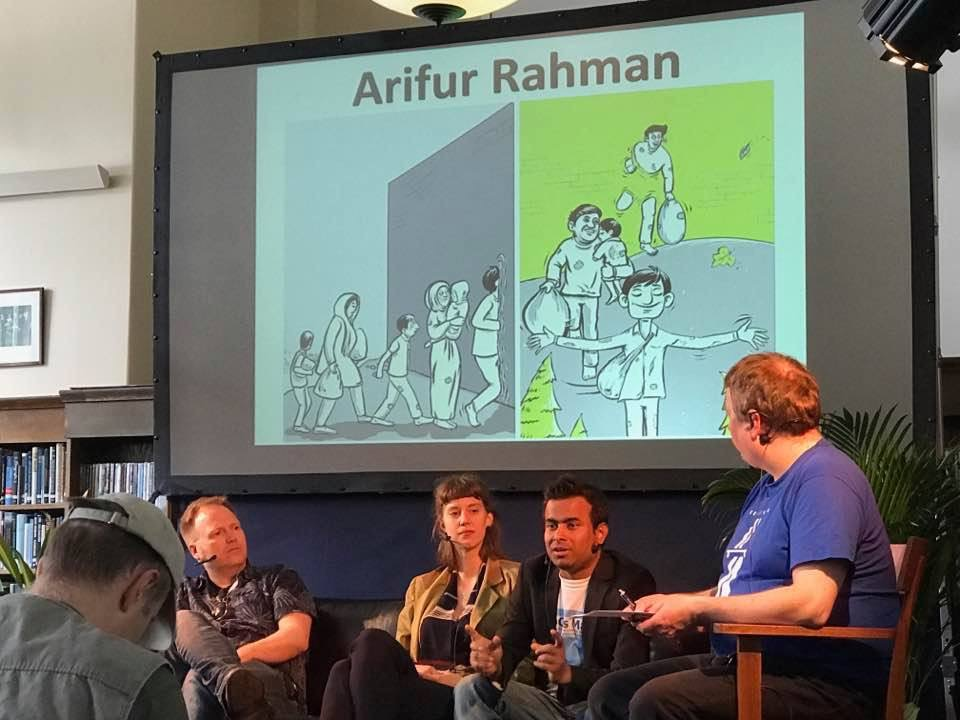
- Rahman (middle right) in 2017
- Born: August 8, 1984 (age 42); Shahzadpur, Sirajganj, Bangladesh
- Citizenship: Norway
- Education: National University, Bangladesh; Nansen Academy; Kristiania University College
- Occupation: Cartoonist
- Years active: 2004–present
- Known for: Political cartoon, Activism
- Title: Founder and Publisher of Toons Mag
- Website: arifurrahman.com

Arifur Rahman (born August 8, 1984) is a Bangladeshi-Norwegian political cartoonist, illustrator and animator. He is a self-taught cartoonist who is renowned for his contribution to cartoons both on the internet and in print media. In Bangladesh, he is best known as Cartoonist Arif for anti-corruption cartoons. He's won multiple awards for Anti-Corruption cartoons from Transparency International Bangladesh and the Daily Star. He was the first and former guest cartoonist of International Cities of Refuge Network (ICORN). He is a publisher of cartoon magazine Toons Mag and the organizer of international cartoon contests and exhibitions.

== Biography ==
=== Early life ===
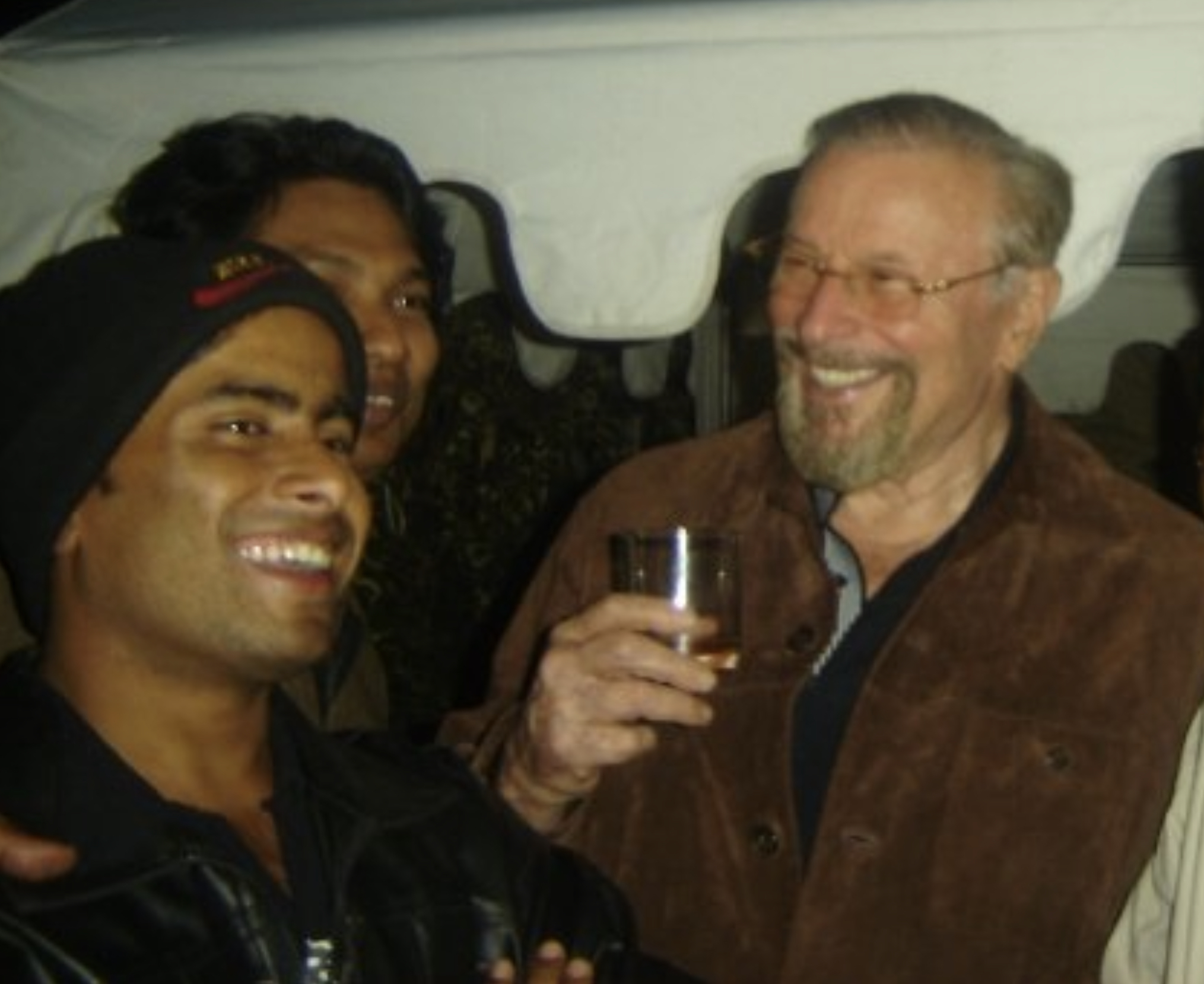
Arifur Rahman (left) with American political cartoonist Ranan Lurie (right) in Kathmandu, Nepal. Photo from South Asian cartoon congress 2008.

Arifur Rahman was born in a small village called Tetiar Kanda in Shahjadpur, Sirajganj, Bangladesh. When Arifur Rahman was in the Preschool, Arif's father left his wife and children and remarried. Arif's parents got divorced afterward and his mother went back to her family's village, taking Arif and his sister along. They were broke and his mother was depressed. Whatever she was to inherit from her father had already been given to her husband in dowry, so she had nothing to get by. Arif, with his mother and sister, lived in a room with their grandmother. Arif's maternal grandfather was a pious man and had two wives. Arif's mother was among the children from his first marriage, but he had come to live with his second wife during those years. It meant he barely saw his first wife. Arif was enrolled in the a nearby school there.

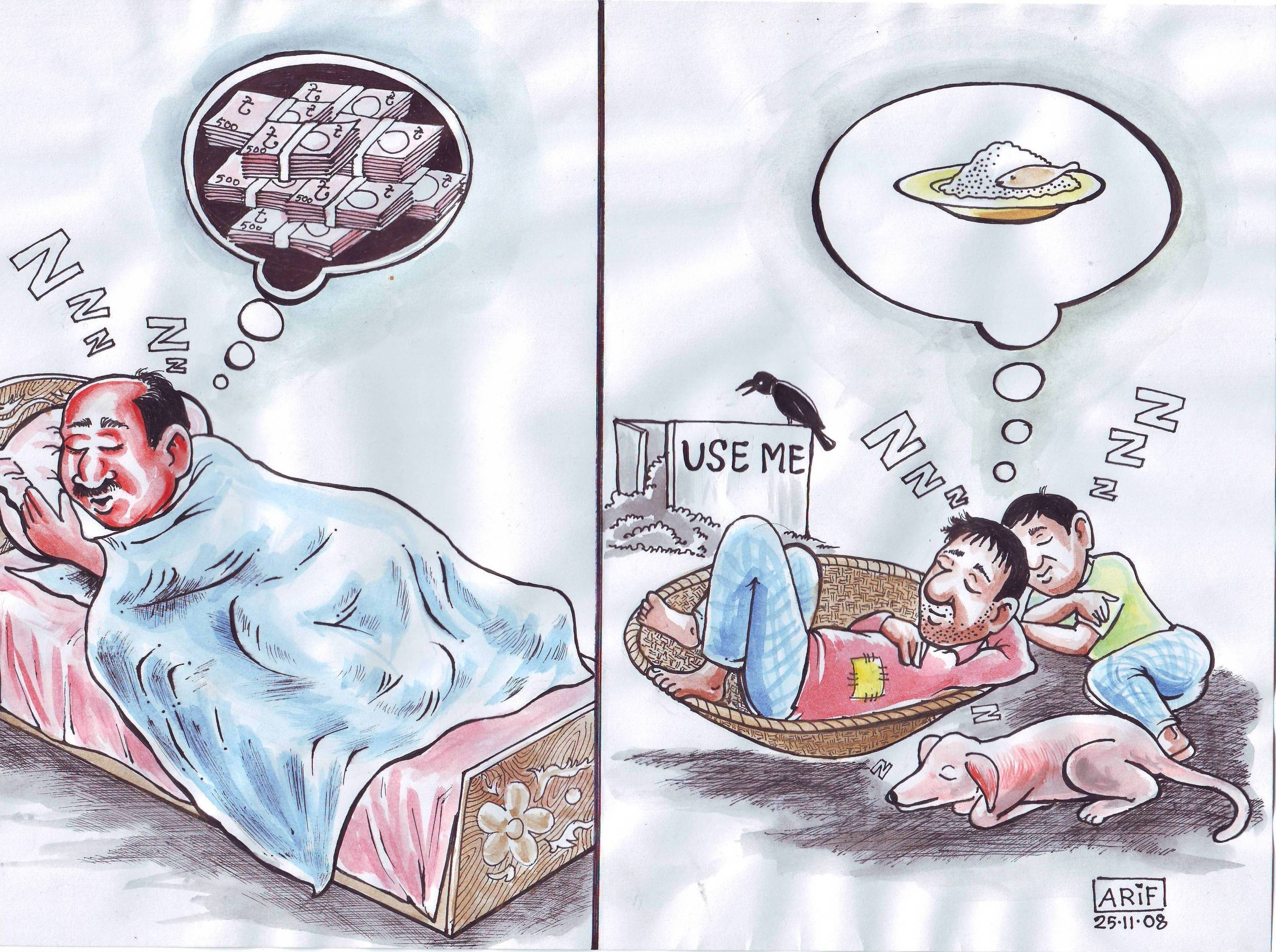
Sleep and dream. This cartoon describes the difference between the poor and the richest, and the difference between their dreams and goals. One of the Arifur Rahman's earlier cartoons from 2008.

Arif and his family struggled for money. His mother started farming chickens for some pocket money. His uncles and aunts helped out by gifting Arif's mother goat and sheep cubs and he used to take care of the cattle when he returned from school. Arif went to a village school back then, which was far away from his grandfather's house. Arif had to walk a very long way to go to school every day. Their village did not yet have access to electricity so, in the evening, he had to study by the tame flame of a kerosene lamp. He was a self-taught cartoonist and started drawing at an early age. His first cartoon was published in 2004 in a satire magazine called Bichhu by the Daily Jugantor. Every day, he drew cartoons and sent them to the newspapers for publishing. That is how he created a name for himself as a cartoonist.

=== Education ===
He studied both in Bangladesh and in Norway.

- 2001–06, Arifur Rahman studied for a Bachelor of Arts at the National University of Bangladesh.
- 2012-13 studied Visual Arts at Nansen Academy, Lillehammer, Norway.
- 2014-16 studied 3D and Animation at Kristiania University College, Oslo, Norway.

== Career ==
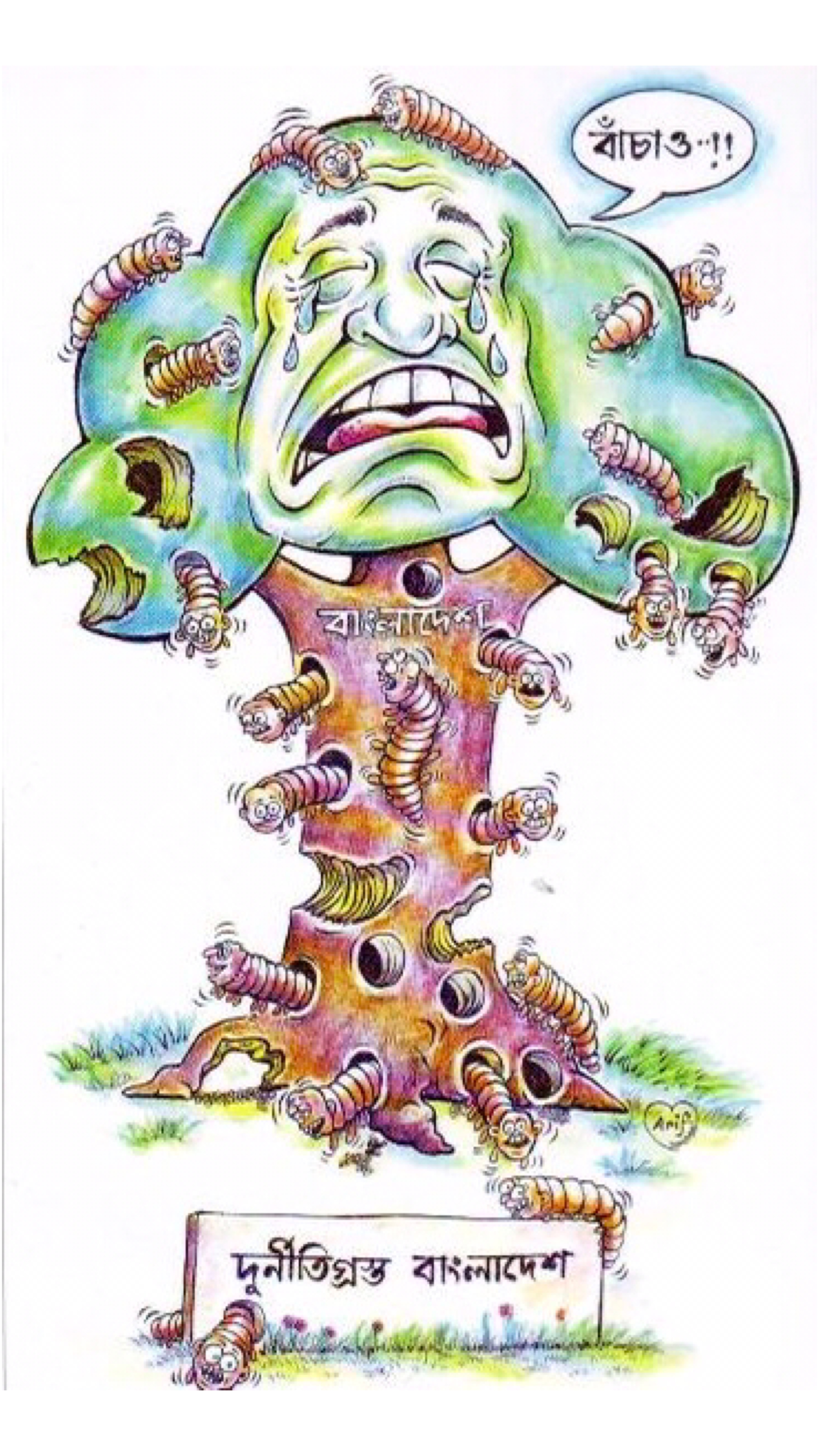
Award-winning anti-corruption cartoon, Arifur Rahman's cartoon about corruption in Bangladesh 2006

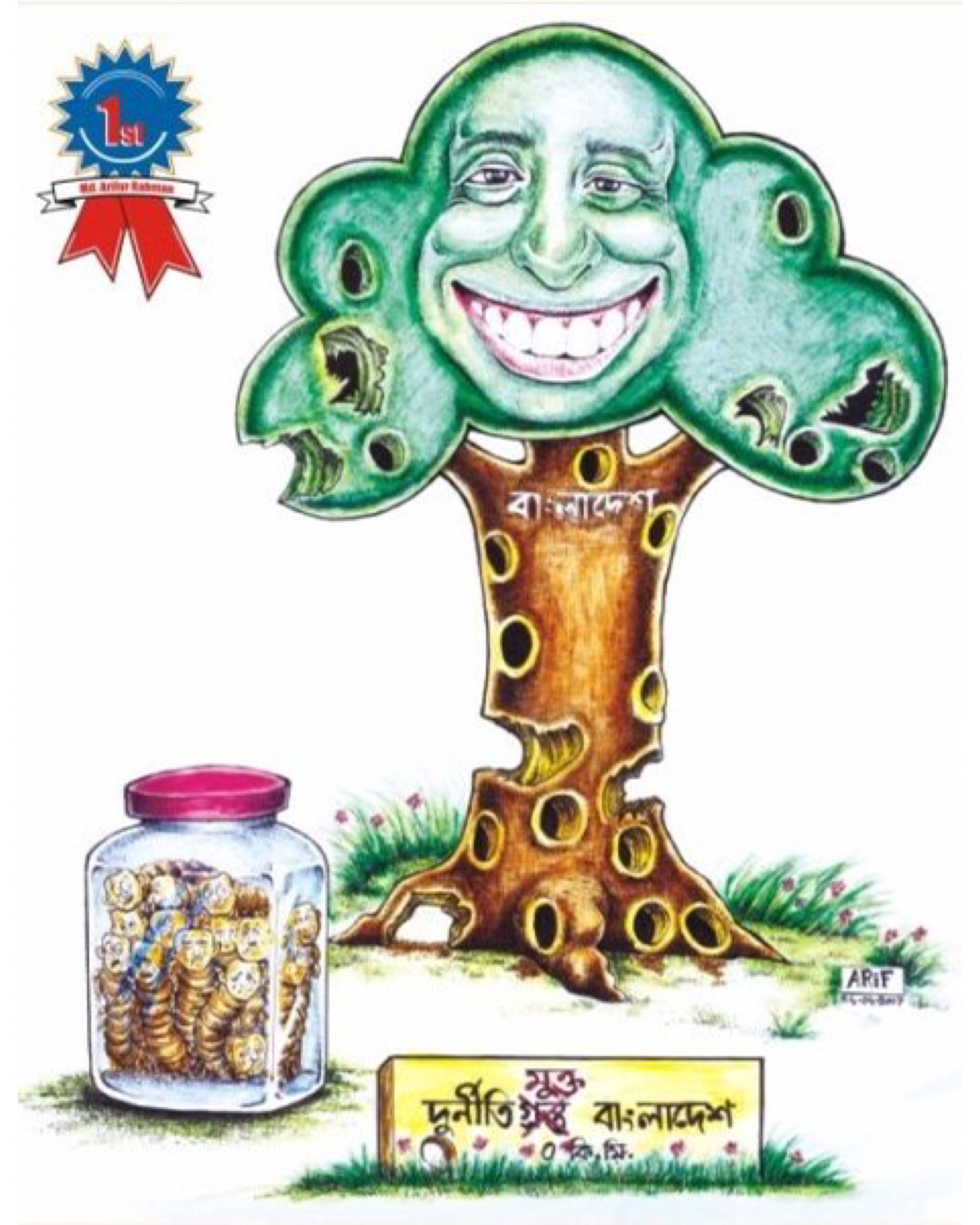
Award-winning anti-corruption cartoon about Bangladesh 2007, cartoon by Arifur Rahman

=== Cartooning in Bangladesh ===
In Bangladesh, he was famously known as "Cartoonist Arif." In April 2004, Arif's cartoon was published in the satire magazine, "Bicchu" under the Daily Jugantor. Since then, he has been drawing political satire cartoons and comic strips instead of paintings. He drew every day and sent his work off to newspapers. Almost all the daily newspapers in Bangladesh regularly published his cartoons back in the day. During 2004–2007, he drew a large number of cartoons for various Bangladeshi newspapers, such as The Daily Jugantar, Bhorer Kagoj, Samakal, Jaijaidin, Amar Desh, Ittefaq and Prothom Alo. He was noticed by people and known as "Cartoonist Arif" around Bangladesh. He was recognized by fellow and legendary Bangladeshi cartoonists like Rafiqun Nabi, Shishir Bhattacharjee, and Ahsan Habib.

In 2005, Rahman won the third prize in a contest titled Pin Hunt that was put on by The Daily Prothom Alo's periodical, Alpin (আলপিন), and won third prize in the Anti-Corruption Cartoon Competition arranged by Transparency International Bangladesh (TIB) in 2006, as well as first prize in the Anti-Corruption Cartoon Competition arranged by The Daily Star in 2007 and in the same year, The Daily Prothom Alo appointed him to draw cartoons as a contributing cartoonist.

== Cartoon controversy in Bangladesh ==
Arifur Rahman's cartoons were regularly published in the satirical weekly supplement of the Prothom Alo newspaper, Alpin, but the one published in the 17 September 2007 edition stirred quite a bit of controversy. The cartoon features a conversation between a little boy and an older man. The cartoon offended religious sentiments and Arif was sued for his cartoon. Some people led by acclaimed religious influencers chose to call for a nationwide strike in Bangladesh on the back of the incident. Alpin was discontinued and the editor, Sumanta Alam, was fired, effective immediately. The editor of Prothom Alo, Matiur Rahman promised never to publish Arifur Rahman's cartoon in his newspaper again. Arif was arrested one day later on September 18, from his residence in Dhaka. He was arrested for being a "traitor" and for "hurting the religious sentiments" under the blasphemy and emergency law of Bangladesh.

=== Trial and Asylum to Norway ===
Imprisoned on 18 September 2007, Arifur Rahman stayed in prison for six months and 2 days. While in prison, Arif was heartbroken and felt very helpless. He felt wronged by his people and the country. He decided while sitting behind the bars that he would create a platform for the artists and art enthusiasts where they could express their talent and enjoy mindful art without any limitations or without the fear of being misunderstood, wrongfully judged or censored.

On 4 February 2008, the High Court ruled Arif's detention illegal, dropped all charges brought against him and ordered his immediate release. But he was not released right away. He was finally freed on 20 March 2008, but the struggle continued for Arif as he found it hard to pursue his cartooning dreams like he used to. He could not continue his studies due to the scandal as universities would not admit him because of his controversial background. In 2009, another case was filed against him in a court in Jessore, Khulna for the very same cartoon published in 2007. The court in Jessore sentenced him to two months of rigorous imprisonment and fined him 500 Bangladeshi Taka, or another seven days in prison for impiety.

Many Bangladeshi newspapers refused to publish any more of Arif's cartoons but some of them, the likes of The Daily Ittefaq and The Daily Prothom Alo, however, agreed to publish them under a pseudonym. Arif was disheartened with that turn of events. His desire to create an uncensorable cartooning platform only got stronger with these unpleasant incidents fanning the fire.

In 2010, the Government of Norway willingly granted Arif political asylum as his life came to a standstill in Bangladesh and his life was under constant threat. Arif wanted to stay back in Bangladesh but he was not able to because of his controversy, as he was labeled by his 2007 scandal. Arif also came to fear for his life as one threat after another kept on coming in all shapes and forms. He had no option but to emigrate to Norway on 30 November 2010, and start a new life there for himself and his ambitions. He cannot enter Bangladesh ever again without being prosecuted.

== Cartooning in Norway ==
In Norway, his cartoons were published in various newspapers and magazines, such as Akershus Amtstidende, Ny Tid, Syn og Segn, Samtiden, Aftenposten, Østlandposten, Østlands-Posten, Bladet Vesterålen, Avisa Nordland, Glåmdalen, Stavanger Aftenblad and Melding til Stortinget by Ministry of Foreign Affairs (Norway).

=== Attack on cartoon exhibition ===
On March 1, 2017, Arifur Rahman had an exhibition in Drøbak, where some new Syrian refugees appeared in the exhibition place before opening and took two of his drawings. One of the drawings was from 2007 from Bangladesh and another one was a criticism of the education system, "Madrasa Education System" in Bangladesh.

== Online media and publishing platform ==
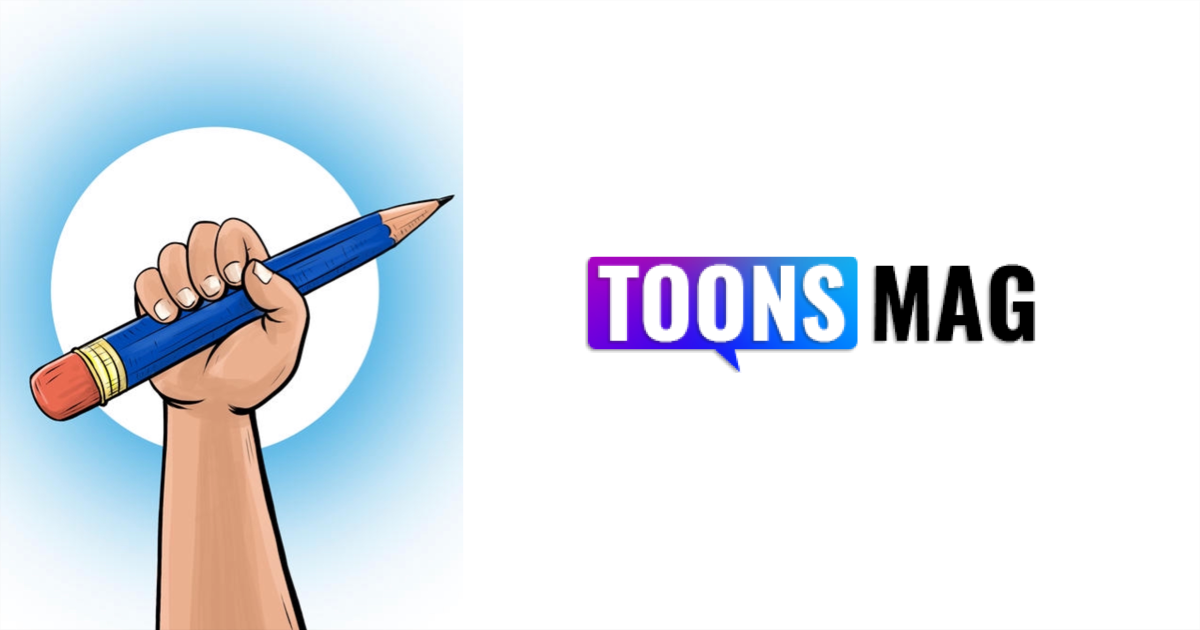
Toons Mag logo and symbols of freedom of speech

Arifur Rahman founded Toons Mag on November 1, 2009. With it, Arifur Rahman's ambition was to create a platform for artists around the world to express themselves without ever being concerned about being shut up by others. Toons Mag was everything Arif had dreamed of and more. To this day, Toons Mag promotes freedom of expression and encourages cartoonists around the world to contribute to it to enrich their cartooning expertise. It has also been holding the International Cartoon Contest and Exhibition every year since 2015 and its venues are scattered around Europe and Asia. Hundreds of cartoonists from around the globe participate in the contest and the selected artworks are exhibited in selected venues each year. So far, it has held exhibitions in over forty venues around the world. Toons Mag is exclusively edited by Arifur Rahman and it continues to be an untameable advocate of free speech. Cartoonists and writers from around the world willingly contribute to Toons Mag to showcase their talent and fulfill their potential.

In 2015, Toons Mag was nominated for the Best of Online Activism by The BOBs (Best of the Blogs), sponsored by Deutsche Welle, and won with a large number of votes. Toons Mag also awards The Cartoonist of the Year Medal every year for outstanding contributions to cartoons since 2016. Arifur Rahman continues to lead Toons Mag, which mirrors its founder's principles.

== Exhibitions ==
Since 2000 to present, his artwork and cartoons have been exhibited in more than 40 places, including Bangladesh, India, Nepal, Norway, Sweden, Morocco, Turkey, France, Croatia, Slovakia and the United States.

== International initiatives ==
Arifur Rahman organized multiple International Cartoon Contest and Exhibitions through the cartoon Magazine Toons Mag to support children's rights, women's rights, freedom of expression, and gender equality.

=== Children in War ===
In 2015, organized the International Cartoon Exhibition "Children in War" to focus on the suffering of children in war and conflict areas, such as in Syria, Yemen, Afghanistan, Iraq. One hundred and twenty-eight cartoonists participated in 51 different countries. On 10 September 2015, the exhibition was opened by Bishop Atle Sommerfeldt in The Norwegian Cartoonist Gallery (Avistegnernes Hus), Drøbak. It was a moving exhibition, which was exhibited in Oslo, Nesodden, Bergen, Stavanger, Haugesund, Kristiansand in Norway, and Norrköping, Sweden. The event was supported by The Norwegian Cartoonist Gallery and Fritt Ord.

=== Women's Rights ===
To draw the global awareness about women's rights, the cartoon competition was organized by Arifur Rahman and Toons Mag. 567 cartoonists were participated from 79 different countries with 1,625 drawings, and 12 cartoonist was won the award out of 567 cartoonists. A selection was represented in the Women's Rights exhibitions, which opened in Drøbak, Bangalore and Uttar Pradesh on International Women's Day, 8 March 2016. The drawings in the exhibitions deal with women's rights and limitations; the lack of education, forced marriage, female genital mutilation, violence, discrimination, legal protection, and workload. On 10 December 2016, it was exhibited in the Brain Sneezing Gallery in the Prešov Wave Club, Slovakia. The event was supported by The Norwegian Cartoonist Gallery, Fritt Ord, Indian Institute of Cartoonist, Brain Sneezing Gallery, Prešov Wave club, EEA funds, and the Slovak Republic.

=== Freedom of Expression ===
This exhibition was organized to support freedom of expression. It has five hundred and eighteen cartoonists who participated from 83 countries, submitting 1,556 cartoons, and 12 cartoonists were won the award out of 518 cartoonists. The exhibition opening was in three countries, Norway, India, and Slovakia. Per Edgard Kokkvold, writer and former newspaper editor inaugurated the exhibition, in Drøbak. In Lillehammer, Norwegian musician Moddi Knutsen, inaugurated the exhibition and Norwegian political cartoonist Roar Hagen announced the award winner. It was also exhibited in Kýchanie Mozgu – Brain Sneezing gallery, Prešov, and Košice, Slovakia, as well as in the Slovak embassy in Oslo, Norway. Later on, it was exhibited on Eidsvoll, Norway. The event was supported by The Norwegian Cartoonist Gallery, Fritt Ord, Norwegian Festival of Literature in Lillehammer, Brain Sneezing Gallery, Prešov, and Indian Institute of Cartoonist.

== Politics ==
In 2018, Arifur Rahman became a member of the Socialist Left Party of Norway. He was elected deputy of the local party committee and was nominated as a candidate in the Frogn Municipality election 2019.

== Awards and achievements ==
- 2005, Arifur Rahman won third prize in the Pin Hunt put on by The Daily Prothom Alo's periodical, Alpin (আলপিন).
- 2006, he won third prize in the Anti-Corruption Cartoon Competition arranged by Transparency International Bangladesh (TIB).
- 2007, he won first prize in the Anti-Corruption Cartoon Competition arranged by The Daily Star.
- 2008, he won a special achievement award in the Anti-Corruption Cartoon Competition arranged by Transparency International Bangladesh (TIB).
- 2008, he won the special achievement award from Cartoonist Rights Network, International.
- 2011, he won the special achievement award for the short animation film, Try.
- 2015, Arif received the Cartoonist Pedro Memorial Grant from the Norwegian Artist Federation.
- 2015, the online magazine, Toons Mag, founded and edited by him, won The BOBs (Best of the Blogs) sponsored by Deutsche Welle for Best of Online Activism.
