= De gales hus =

2008 Norwegian film directed by Eva Isaksen

- Directed by: Eva Isaksen
- Written by: Åse Vikene
- Based on: Karin Fossum's novel De gales hus
- Produced by: Hilde Berg; Bent Rognlien
- Starring: Ingrid Bolsø Berdal; Thorbjørn Harr; Fridtjov Såheim; Andrea Bræin Hovig; Hildegun Riise; Rolf Kristian Larsen; Pål Sverre Hagen; Frank Kjosås; Anneke von der Lippe; Rolf Lassgård
- Cinematography: Harald Gunnar Paalgard
- Edited by: Pål Gengenbach; Silje Nordseth
- Music by: Adam Norén
- Distributed by: Norsk Filmproduksjon AS
- Release date: September 12, 2008
- Running time: 102 minutes
- Country: Norway
- Language: Norwegian

De gales hus (House of Fools) is a 2008 Norwegian film directed by Eva Isaksen. The screenplay, written by Åse Vikene, is based on Karin Fossum's novel De gales hus. The cinematographer was Harald Gunnar Paalgard. The film was produced by Hilde Berg and Bent Rognlien for Norsk Filmproduksjon A/S.

== Plot ==
Through twenty-four-year-old Aina's eyes, viewers get to know the patients at Varden, a psychiatric hospital, showing how, despite the madness, they return her zest for life to her.

== Cast ==
- Ingrid Bolsø Berdal as Aina
- Thorbjørn Harr as Stetson
- Fridtjov Såheim as Odin
- Rolf Kristian Larsen as Formel
- Andrea Bræin Hovig as Maria
- Joachim Rafaelsen as Moffa
- Hildegun Riise as the angel
- Besim Jakupi as Zoran
- Pål Sverre Hagen as Tussi
- Jeppe Beck Laursen as Jørgen
- Frank Kjosås as Ruben
- Anneke von der Lippe as Hedda
- Rolf Lassgård as Freiner
- Christin Borge as a cook
- Kyrre Hellum as a waiter
- Gisken Armand as Death
