= Cold Prey =

- International poster of Cold Prey
- Norwegian: Fritt Vilt
- Directed by: Roar Uthaug
- Written by: Thomas Moldestad
- Produced by: Martin Sundland; Magne Lyngner
- Starring: Ingrid Bolsø Berdal; Rolf Kristian Larsen; Viktoria Winge; Endre Martin Midtstigen; Tomas Alf Larsen
- Cinematography: Daniel Voldheim
- Edited by: Jon Endre Mørk
- Music by: Magnus Beite
- Distributed by: SF Norge AS
- Release date: 13 October 2006
- Running time: 97 minutes
- Country: Norway
- Languages: Norwegian; English
- Box office: $3.7 million

Cold Prey (Norwegian: Fritt Vilt, lit. "Open Season") is a 2006 Norwegian slasher film directed by Roar Uthaug, in his feature directorial debut. Starring Ingrid Bolsø Berdal, Rolf Kristian Larsen and Viktoria Winge, it follows a group of friends who, while snowboarding in the mountains, seek shelter in an abandoned hotel and unwittingly fall prey to a serial killer. It premiered in Norway on October 13, 2006, and was the 9th highest-grossing film of the year in Norway. A sequel, Cold Prey 2, was released in 2008.

== Plot ==
In Jotunheimen, a boy with a large birthmark covering the left eye runs frantically through a blizzard, pursued by an unknown entity. Eventually, his pursuer catches up to him and buries him alive in the snow.

Years later, a young group of friends consisting of Jannicke, her boyfriend Eirik, and their friends, Mikal, Ingunn, and Morten Tobias are going on a snowboarding vacation in Jotunheimen. Morten Tobias took a bad fall from skiing and broke his leg. Jannicke sets his leg but they have no cell reception and their car is too far away for medical evacuation. Wandering over a hill, they spot a lodge and decide to seek help there.

Eirik, after discovering that the lodge is deserted, breaks in and opens the door. As Jannicke looks for medical supplies she comes across a box that contains superglue and a single shotgun shell. Jannicke attempts first aid on Morten's broken leg with alcohol and the superglue. Eirik, Mikal and Ingunn explores the abandoned lodge, and discover a generator, which Eirik fixes and restores power to the lodge.

With the lights back on, music playing and plentiful amounts of food and alcohol, the group relaxes in the parlor. Jannicke finds the hotel's guestbook and discovers that the last guest checked in some time in 1975 and there is a message reading "We hope you find your son". Inside the book, there is a picture of a family that includes the boy with a birthmark over his eye.

The group settles in for the night with Mikal and Ingunn running off to a suite, Jannicke and Eirik cuddling under blankets in the parlor, and Morten Tobias alone on the couch. Making out in bed, Ingunn rejected Mikal advances and Mikal leaves to compose himself by the bar. Alone, Ingunn enters the hallway after hearing strange noise and is ambushed by a man wielding a Pickaxe. Her scream for help is drowned out by the music playing and she is stabbed by a pickaxe and dragged away.

The next morning, Eirik leaves the lodge to look for help while Mikal heads to the suite to apologize to Ingunn. Eirik stumbles upon Ingunn's dead body in the snow before being knocked out by an unseen figure. As Mikal receives no replies from Ingunn, he and Jannicke explores the basement and find old important items not usually left behind by travellers.

Jannicke goes to talk to Ingunn only to discover the suite covered in blood. She brings Mikal and Morten Tobias to the bloodied suite, and they realize someone else is in the lodge. They barricade themselves in an empty suite and footsteps are heard in the hall as someone begins to slam against the door, trying to get in. Mikal scouts the lodge after it quiets down and discovers a Massive Mountain Man too tough to deal with before returning to Jannicke.

Mikal tells Jannicke they should run, leaving Morten Tobias but Jannicke refuses. Mikal escapes through the window alone but is caught by a Bear-trap near the shed. Unable to run, he hides in the shed when the Mountain Man approaches. Jannicke and Morten Tobias watch through the window as Mikal fights and loses against the Mountain Man.

Jannicke hides Morten Tobias to a pantry room while she scouts for things they can use to escape the lodge. She narrowly misses being spotted by the Mountain Man as he drags Mikal's body inside. Jannicke runs to the shed where she finds some skis, a sled, and a shotgun. She returns to Morten Tobias with a loaded shotgun and tells him she has a plan.

Jannicke and Morten Tobias kill the generator, baiting the Mountain Man to go to the basement. Morten Tobias finds a box cutter and puts it in his pocket and hides. Jannicke enters the back room and finds Eirik tied up and still alive. Unable to free him, she goes back into hiding near Morten Tobias. When the Mountain Man appears going into the back room, Jannicke points the gun at him, but he shuts off his flashlight and disappears into darkness. Thinking quickly, Jannicke shuts the door and locks him in the back room, but refuses to leave him in there with Eirik. Opening the door, she shoots but is knocked over by Morten Tobias who realizes the Mountain Man is using Erik as a human shield. The Mountain Man impales Eirik with his pickaxe, killing him. Morten Tobias tells Jannicke to run and tries to kill the Mountain Man but to no avail. Jannicke grabs her skis from the shed and runs outside into the darkness only to be knocked out by the Mountain Man.

Jannicke wakes up buried under her friend on a sled. The Mountain Man is tossing her friends one by one into a deep ravine. Jannicke grabs the box cutter out of Morten Tobias's pocket and pretends to be dead. Jannicke, the last to be dragged off the sled, stabs the Mountain Man in the neck with the box cutter. They struggle over the pickaxe near the edge of the ravine. Jannicke manage to rip off the Mountain Man google revealing his birthmark over his eye. This surprises the Mountain Man and Jannicke grabs his pickaxe and stabs him in the stomach, sending him over the edge of the ravine.

In a flashback, we see the Mountain Man as a boy, running from his pursuer. As he is covered in the snow, he looks up to see the faces of his parents burying him alive. The Mountain Man hits the bottom of the ravine, surrounded by the bodies of Jannicke's friends. Jannicke, exhausted, collapses into the snow.

== Cast ==
- Ingrid Bolsø Berdal as Jannicke
- Rolf Kristian Larsen as Morten Tobias
- Viktoria Winge as Ingunn
- Tomas Alf Larsen as Eirik
- Endre Martin Midtstigen as Mikal
- Rune Melby as The Mountain Man
  - Erik Skjeggedal as Young Mountain Man
- Tonie Lunde as Mother
- Hallvard Holmen as Father

== Production ==
The movie was shot at the peak of Jotunheimen. Helicopters flew the 20 tons of equipment to the top of the mountain where the temperature was below −25 degrees Celsius. It took 2 years to shoot the film and another 9 months for special effects and editing.

== Release ==
Cold Prey premiered on October 13, 2006, in Norway and in January 2007 part of the 13. Slamdance Film Festival in Utah, United States. Since February 2015 the video on demand rights are in the United States by Hulu.

The film was the 9th highest-grossing film of the year in Norway.

The film has been shown in North America at the 2007 Slamdance Film Festival, the 2007 San Francisco International Film Festival, the 2007 Seattle International Film Festival, and the 2007 Montreal World Film Festival, and was also shown as part of the Night of the Dead VII during the annual Leeds International Film Festival, as well as the 2007 London FrightFest Film Festival in the United Kingdom.

== Reception ==
At Kosmorama in Trondheim in 2007, Martin Sundland and Magne Lyngner won Best Producers and Christian Schanning won Best Sound for the film. At the 2007 Grossmann film and wine festival, the film received the "Vicious Cat Award." Dennis Harvey from Variety gave the film a positive review, calling it "a conventional but nicely handled slasher pic", praising the film's cinematography, likable characters, and scares. Harvey's only criticism was the film's killer which he called "a generic Halloween-y faceless ghoul in goggles and heavy winter wear." Justin Kerswell from Hysteria Lives! wrote a mixed review, complimenting the film's acting, and characterizations, but criticized its languid pacing and ending. Scott Weinberg of FEARnet believed that the film "works well by force of style, splat, and intensity." Bloody Disgusting picked it as one of the best horror films of the year.

== Sequel ==
The sequel Cold Prey 2 under the direction of Mats Stenberg was released in 2008. The prequel, called Cold Prey 3, was released in 2010.

== Remake ==
In 2017, WWE Studios acquired the exclusive English-language remake rights to the franchise and sealed a deal for an option to purchase the screenplay by Casey La Scala. The American remake will also be named Cold Prey.
