= Ingrid Bolsø Berdal =

Norwegian actress

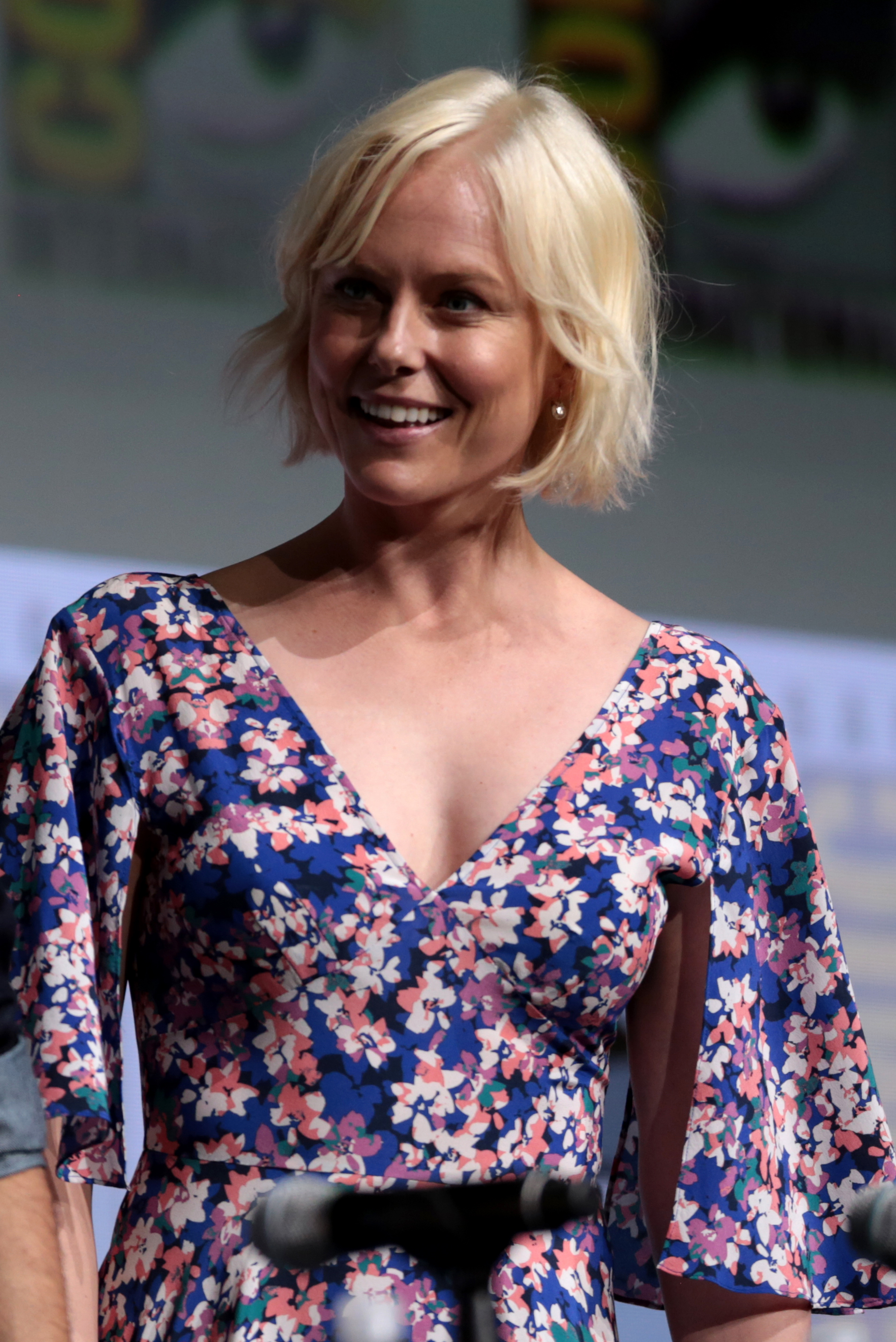
- Bolsø Berdal at the 2017 San Diego Comic Con
- Born: March 2, 1980 (age 46); Utøy, Nord-Trøndelag, Norway
- Education: Oslo National Academy of the Arts
- Occupation: Actress
- Years active: 2005–present
- Awards: Amanda Award

Ingrid Bolsø Berdal (Urban East Norwegian: [ˈɪ̀ŋrɪ ˈbʊ̀lsøː ˈbæ̀ːɖɑɫ];) is a Norwegian actress. She started her career with the 2005 short film Limbo. Her first leading role was in the Norwegian slasher film Cold Prey (2006). She has since appeared in over fourteen films, including Chernobyl Diaries (2012), Hansel & Gretel: Witch Hunters (2013), and Hercules (2014). From 2016 to 2018, she played the role of Armistice in the HBO series Westworld (2016–2022).

== Career ==
Berdal is the recipient of the Amanda Award (the Norwegian Film Award) for Best Actress for the film Cold Prey. She was also nominated for Best Actress for Cold Prey 2 two years later. She hosted the Norwegian Film Awards (The Amanda Awards) in 2010 and 2012. In January 2011, she opened her monologue Frøken Else at The Norwegian Theatre, receiving positive reviews. In 2014, she played the only female warrior, Atalanta, in the film Hercules.

== Filmography ==
=== Film ===
Year	Title	Role	Notes
2005	Limbo	Carmen	short film
2006	Cold Prey	Jannicke	
2006	Sons	Norunn	
2006	Comrade Pedersen	District Representative	
2006	A Man There Was	Ida Vigen	Short film
2007	False Start	Receptionist	Short film
2008	De gales hus	Aina	
2008	Cold Prey 2	Jannicke	
2009	Betrayal	Kristin	
2010	Resolve	Her	Short film
2010	Terry Pratchett's Going Postal	Sergeant Angua	TV film
2010	Wide Blue Yonder	Nina	
2011	I Travel Alone	Herdis Snartemo	
2012	Chernobyl Diaries	Zoe	
2012	The ABCs of Death	Frau Scheisse (voice)	segment "H is for Hydro-Electric Diffusion"
2012	Escape (Flukt)	Dagmar	
2013	Kill Buljo 2	Anniken Skaiwalker	
2013	Grandmother and the eight kids	Mother	
2013	Hansel & Gretel: Witch Hunters	Horned Witch	
2014	Hercules	Atalanta	
2015	Women for Large Men's Shirts	Wanda Ås	
2015	The Absence of Eddy Table	Kari (voice)	Short film
2017	Forget About Nick	Jade	
2019	The Spy	Sonja Wigert	
2022	Everybody Hates Johan	Solvor	

=== Television ===
- Codename Hunter (2006)
- Thomas P (2007)
- Eve and Adam (2007)
- Codename Hunter 2 (2008)
- Heart to Heart 2 (2010)
- Hellfjord (2012)
- Westworld (2016–2018)
- Kieler Street (2018)
- Witch Hunt (2020)
- Stardust (2020)
- La Palma (2024)

=== Stage ===
- Kristin-spelet at Sel (2004)
- Ned til Sol at Det Norske Teatret (2005)
- Trollprisen at Det Norske Teatret (2005)
- The Caucasian Chalc Circle at Det Norske Teatret (2006)
- Bikubesong at Det Norske Teatret (2006)
- Frank at Det Norske Teatret (2006)
- Hair at Det Norske Teatret (2007)
- Black Milk at Det Norske Teatret (2007)
- Ivanov at Det Norske Teatret (2007)
- Yvonne, Princess of Burgundy at Det Norske Teatret (2008)
- The Experiment Jo Strømgren Kompani (2010)
- Frøken Else at Det Norske Teatret (2011)
- Baby at The Norwegian Theatre (2013)
