= Harald Paalgard =

Norwegian cinematographer (1950–2025)

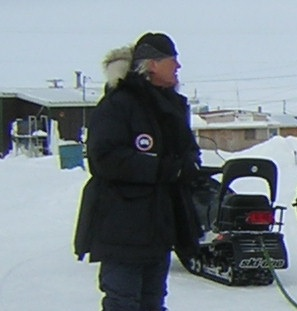
- Born: Harald Gunnar Paalgard; 4 May 1950; Norway
- Died: 20 January 2025 (aged 74)
- Occupation: Cinematographer
- Years active: 1976–2019

Harald Gunnar Paalgard (4 May 1950 – 20 January 2025) was a Norwegian cinematographer. He was educated at Dramatiska Institutet in Stockholm, Sweden. Paalgard died on 20 January 2025, at the age of 74.

== Selected filmography ==
- 1981: Martin
- 1985: Orion's Belt
- 1992: Svarte pantere
- 1992: The Warrior's Heart
- 1993: The Last Lieutenant
- 1994: Dreamplay
- 2003: Arven
- 2004: As It Is in Heaven
- 2005: Arctic Passage
- 2008: De gales hus
- 2010: The Woman That Dreamed About a Man
