= Cold Prey 2 =

- Poster of "Fritt Vilt II"
- Directed by: Mats Stenberg
- Written by: Thomas Moldestad; Roar Uthaug; Martin Sundland
- Produced by: Martin Sundland; Kristian Sinkerud
- Starring: Ingrid Bolsø Berdal; Marthe Snorresdotter Rovik; Kim Wifladt; Fridtjov Såheim; Johanna Mørck; Mats Eldøen; Rune Melby
- Cinematography: Anders Flatland
- Edited by: Jon Endre Mørk
- Music by: Magnus Beite
- Distributed by: Nordisk Film
- Release date: 10 October 2008
- Running time: 86 minutes
- Country: Norway
- Language: Norwegian
- Box office: $3,380,797

Cold Prey 2 (Norwegian: Fritt Vilt II) is a 2008 Norwegian slasher film directed by Mats Stenberg. It is the sequel to the 2006 film Cold Prey (Fritt Vilt), and was written by Roar Uthaug and again stars Ingrid Bolsø Berdal in the leading role. The film picks up where the first left off, where the female protagonist is picked up in the wilderness and brought to a hospital, but soon her nightmare starts all over again. Reviewers, though not overwhelmed, declared it a good sequel to the original. Premiering in Norway on 10 October 2008, its opening weekend was the best for any Norwegian movie in history.

== Plot ==
Jannicke (Berdal), the only survivor from the massacre depicted in the previous movie, is found in Jotunheimen and brought to a hospital in Otta. She receives good care, but she is still traumatized from her ordeal. At the hospital she speaks with the police and informs them of the location of the bodies, including that of the killer mountain man. Jannicke also speaks with and befriends a young boy, Daniel, who is a patient as well.

The police discover several bodies in the crevice as Jannicke described; one of them is the body of the mountain man. The police transport all the bodies back to the hospital for autopsies. Doctor Camilla brings Jannicke to the morgue for some closure; Jannicke, however, becomes violent when she sees the mountain man's body.

While a nurse is cataloging the mountain man's clothes, he begins to stir. The staff frantically work to revive the man. When Jannicke sees what the medical staff were doing, she is desperate to stop them. The staff sedated Jannike despite Camilla's objection. The Mountain man condition is stable, but he is in a coma. Some time later he awakens and murders the policeman who was guarding him.

Meanwhile, the police chief has been researching old files of disappearances, and he discovers that the mountain man has been killing people on the mountain for decades. The mountain man was a disturbed, violent child whose parents owned the mountain hotel. The police chief instructed some policemen to return to the crevice, and they found many more older dead bodies.

At the hospital, the mountain man commences a killing spree across the hospital, while Jannicke awakens, finds Daniel and Camilla, and eventually locks the mountain man in the basement. By the time the trio reaches the exit, the police have arrived. Daniel is taken safely away by his mother.

The officers order Jannicke and Camilla to remain outside while they go in to apprehend the trapped mountain man. Not heeding Jannicke's warnings, the officers enter the hospital to discover that the mountain man has knocked the basement door down. As they are leaving the hospital, the mountain man springs a trap and kills all but Ole, Camilla's boyfriend, who is gravely wounded.

Seeing the flash of gunshots within the hospital, Jannicke demands to enter the hospital with the remaining officer, but before they can act, the mountain man attacks, wounding her and killing the officer. As the mountain man prepares to kill Camilla, he is shot and incapacitated by the dying Ole.

Jannicke comforts Camilla but turns to discover that the mountain man's body has disappeared into the woods, presumably headed towards his lair in the abandoned hotel. The determined Jannicke resolves to return to the hotel to kill him, despite Camilla's warning. Jannicke travels by snowmobile to the hotel and preps the hotel such that there is only one entrance, but she falls asleep as she waits for the mountain man's return. When she awakens, he is already standing behind her.

After a brief and fierce struggle, moments before a killing blow to Jannicke, he is shot in the back by the newly arrived Camilla. The mountain man redirects his attention to Camilla, grabbing Camilla by the head and begins to crush her. Panicking, Jannicke throws the pickaxe, which spears him through the heart. Although Camilla assures her that he is dead, Jannicke retrieves her shotgun and fires it point blank into the mountain man's head.

== Cast ==
- Ingrid Bolsø Berdal as Jannicke
- Marthe Snorresdotter Rovik as Camilla
- Kim Wifladt as Ole
- Fridtjov Såheim as Herman
- Johanna Mørck as Audhild
- Mats Eldøen as Sverre
- Robert Follin as The Mountain Man

== Production ==
The first of the two Cold Prey-movies was extremely well received, and seen by 260,000 – a high number for Norway. One reviewer even described it as "the best slasher flick" of 2006. For this reason the expectations on the sequel were high, and Ingrid Bolsø Berdal (whose character was the only surviving member of the original cast) emphasised the determination of everyone involved to make good film, not simply cash in on a mediocre sequel. Though she enjoyed the role, Berdal insisted that this would be the last installment.

Norsk Filmfond gave financial support to the project 4 February 2008, and the new cast was announced 20 February. Mats Stenberg took over as director after Roar Uthaug, who had directed the first movie. Filming started in late February.

The shooting was eventful, with Berdal at one point suffering from food poisoning; having to perform scenes in between throwing up. There were also lighter moments, with team members hiding in various rooms of the hotel where they were staying, doing their best to scare the others by jumping out wearing masks. While the outdoor scenes were filmed in the wild scenery of Jotunheimen and the village Otta, the scenes in the hospital were shot in Åslund hospital in Ås.

== Reception ==
Norwegian reviewers were remarkably unanimous in their assessment of the film. All of the three major national newspapers gave it four out of six points. The consensus was that, even though the sequel did not quite live up to the original, it was still enjoyable and not disappointing. Morten Ståle Nilsen, writing for Verdens Gang, commented on the beautiful natural setting, and commended Berdal for managing to look both battered and sexy at the same time. Dagbladet's Vegard Larsen declared himself surprised that the sequel turned out as well as it did. Like Nilsen, he compared Berdal to Ellen Ripley, Sigourney Weaver's character in the Alien-films. Per Haddal in Aftenposten concluded that the film failed to scare its audience as much as it intended, but he nevertheless complimented the solid handiwork.

The movie was seen by 101,564 people on its opening weekend, which was a new Norwegian record for a domestic movie. The previous record – of 70,952 – was set by Mors Elling in 2003. The box-office success was largely the result of a massive marketing campaign in the weeks leading up to the movie's release.

Anton Bitel of the Vodzilla.co gave the film 6 out of 10. He praised its outside and inside scenery but said that it was lacking originality.

== Home media ==
Cold Prey 2 was released on DVD on 23 April 2013.

== Prequel ==
The prequel titled Cold Prey 3, directed by Mikkel Brænne Sandemose, was released in 2010.
