= Cold Pursuit =

2019 film by Hans Petter Moland

- U.S. theatrical release poster
- Directed by: Hans Petter Moland
- Written by: Frank Baldwin
- Based on: In Order of Disappearance by Kim Fupz Aakeson
- Produced by: Finn Gjerdrum; Stein B. Kvae; Michael Shamberg; Ameet Shukla
- Starring: Liam Neeson; Tom Bateman; Tom Jackson; Emmy Rossum; Domenick Lombardozzi; Julia Jones; John Doman; Laura Dern
- Cinematography: Philip Øgaard
- Edited by: Nicolaj Monberg
- Music by: George Fenton
- Production companies: MAS Productions; Paradox Films; Canal+; Ciné+
- Distributed by: Summit Entertainment; Lionsgate (United States); Elevation Pictures; Entract Films (Canada); SF Studios (Scandinavia); StudioCanal (International)
- Release date: February 8, 2019 (United States)
- Running time: 119 minutes
- Countries: Norway; United States; United Kingdom; Canada; France; China; Germany
- Language: English
- Budget: $60 million
- Box office: $76.3 million

Cold Pursuit is a 2019 action thriller film directed by Hans Petter Moland and written by Frank Baldwin. An international co-production, the film stars Liam Neeson, Tom Bateman, Tom Jackson, Emmy Rossum, Domenick Lombardozzi, Julia Jones, John Doman, and Laura Dern. It is a remake of the 2014 Norwegian film In Order of Disappearance (Kraftidioten), also directed by Moland, and follows a vengeful snowplow driver (Neeson) who starts killing the members of a drug cartel following the murder of his son.

The film was released in the United States on February 8, 2019, by Lionsgate and Summit Entertainment. It grossed $76 million worldwide and received mixed reviews from critics.

== Plot ==
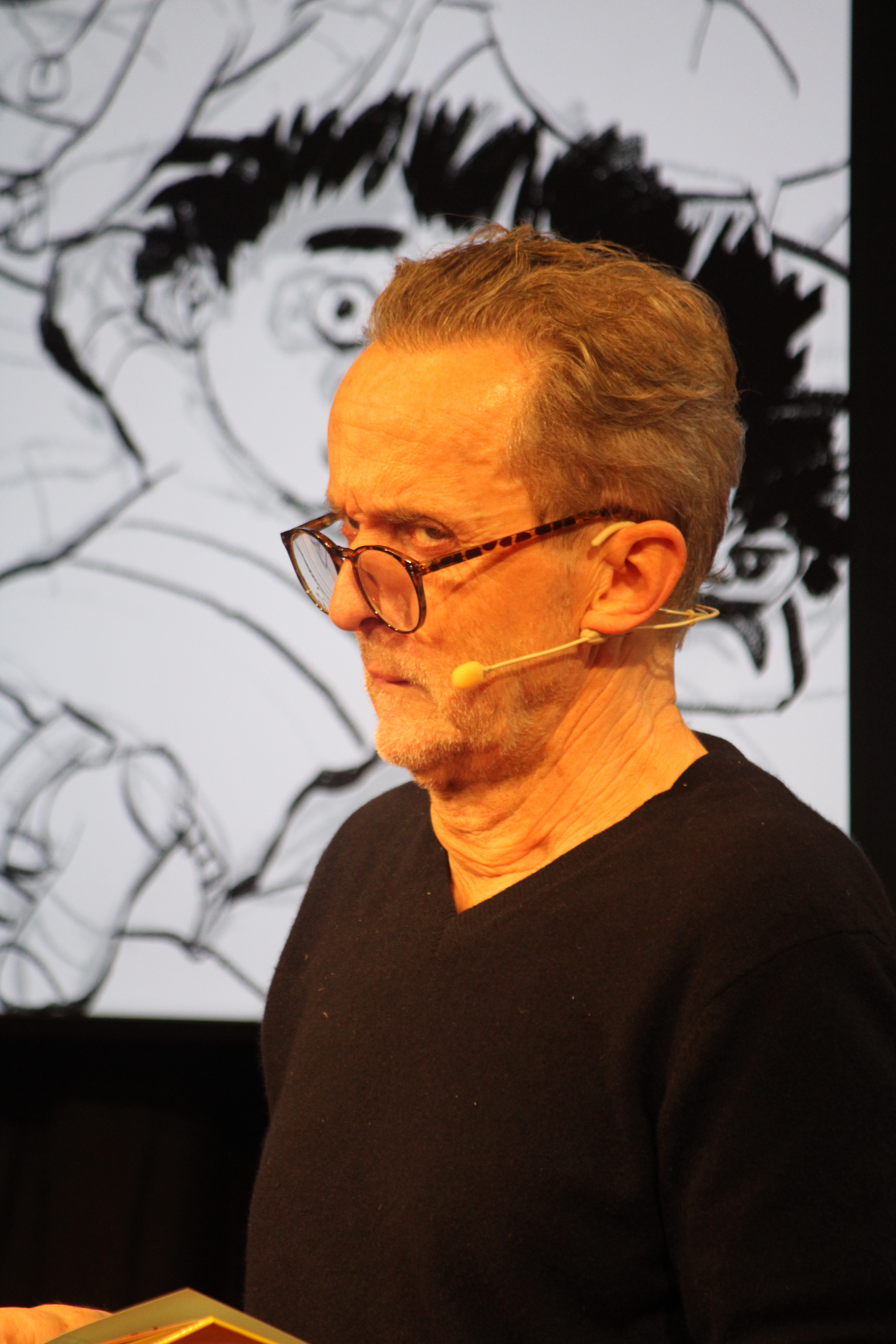
Kim Fupz Aakeson, writer of the book

After being awarded Citizen of the Year by the ski resort of Kehoe, Colorado, snowplow driver Nels Coxman's life is disrupted when his son dies from a forced heroin overdose, murdered by a Denver drug cartel. Nels saws the barrel off a rifle and kills three members of the cartel (Speedo, Limbo, and Santa), dumping their bodies over a nearby waterfall, wrapped in chicken-wire fencing. This allows fish to eat the flesh, whilst the wire keeps the bones at the bottom of the water; a disposal method that Nels read about in a crime novel. Meanwhile his wife, Grace, angry at his seemingly cold lack of grief, leaves him.

The cartel's drug lord, Trevor "Viking" Calcote, suspects that the deaths are the work of his rival White Bull, a Ute with whom he has managed to avoid conflict. Viking has one of Bull's gangsters murdered, not realising it is White Bull's only son. This drives White Bull to seek vengeance and he orders his men to kidnap Viking's young son Ryan in retaliation, which starts a gang war. Nels's brother Brock, once a mob enforcer known as Wingman, tells Nels that killing Viking requires a hired assassin and recommends a hitman known as "The Eskimo". The Eskimo agrees to kill Viking for US$90,000 but decides to get more money from Viking by informing him that Coxman has hired him for the hit. However, Viking does not appreciate the Eskimo's lack of ethics and has him killed.

Viking assumes the Eskimo meant Brock Coxman (rather than Nels) and brings him in. Since Brock is dying of cancer anyway, he claims responsibility to protect his brother. Viking tries to stop the conflict with White Bull escalating, by using one of his own men (Dexter) as a scapegoat and sending White Bull his head (unbeknownst to Viking, his right-hand man Mustang, was in a relationship with Dexter). White Bull isn't satisfied though and he shoots the messenger. Meanwhile, Nels kidnaps Ryan from his prep school before White Bull's men can get to him. Nels wants to draw Viking into an ambush, but his identity is revealed by the school's janitor, who is promised US$10,000 for the information, but is instead killed after his disclosure.

In a phone call, Nels tells Viking to come to his house alone. Viking says it will take him three hours, but he already knows the address and is only minutes away. Nels takes Ryan with him to work though and Viking finds the house empty. While teaching Ryan how to drive the snow equipment, Nels meets Kehoe patrol Officers Kimberly Dash and Gip on the road and says Ryan is his visiting nephew. The police comment that they saw various cars at his place and Nels realizes Viking and his men are on his trail. Mustang, who has stayed behind at Nels's home and has been grieving over Dexter's murder, tips off the Ute that Viking was responsible for the death of White Bull's son and where he can be found.

Nels hides Ryan in a safe place knowing that Viking and his men are coming. Nels is captured and taken to Viking, who instructs his men to torture him to find out where his son is. A mob of the Ute arrive however, and during the ensuing shootout, most of both groups are killed. Viking, attempting to drive away, is trapped when Nels uses machinery to impale his car with a tree trunk, allowing White Bull to shoot Viking. When officers Dash and Gip arrive, Viking is unable to give Nels' name to the police with his dying breath. Dash spots Ryan driving an industrial snow blower in the direction of Kehoe, but chooses not to follow, instead calling it into dispatch. As Nels leaves in his snowplow to continue work, White Bull jumps into the cab; after initially holding Nels at gunpoint, the two men drive away together, both satisfied for having avenged their respective children's deaths. Avalanche, one of White Bull's men, who had gone paragliding earlier, accidentally flies into the snowplow, being minced to death (throughout the film, after each death a black screen shows the name of the dead man, his gang nickname and a religious or other symbol, connected to him).

== Cast ==
- Liam Neeson as Nels Coxman
- Tom Bateman as Trevor "Viking" Calcote
- Tom Jackson as White Bull Legrew
- Emmy Rossum as Kim Dash, a Kehoe police officer
- Domenick Lombardozzi as Mustang, a senior enforcer for Viking
- Julia Jones as Aya, Viking's Ute former wife and mother of his son
- John Doman as John "Gip" Gipsky, Kim's partner
- Laura Dern as Grace Coxman, Nels' wife
- Aleks Paunovic as Detective Osgard
- William Forsythe as Brock "Wingman" Coxman, Nels' brother and a former hitman for Viking's father
- Raoul Trujillo as Giles "Thorpe" Wills, a member of the Ute people and enforcer for White Bull
- Benjamin Hollingsworth as Tycho "Dexter" Hammel, an enforcer for Viking and Mustang's secret lover
- Michael Eklund as Steve "Speedo" Milliner
- Bradley Stryker as Jacob "Limbo" Rutman
- David O'Hara as Gallum "Sly" Ferrante, an enforcer for Viking
- Christopher Logan as Ameet "Shiv" Anand
- Nathaniel Arcand as Fredrick "Smoke" Alycott
- Ben Cotton as Timothy "Windex" Denois
- Micheál Richardson as Kyle Coxman, Nels' son
- Mitchell Saddleback as Clement "Avalanche" Skenadore
- Manna Nichols as Minya, a secretary at White Bull's headquarters
- Arnold Pinnock as Leighton "The Eskimo" Deeds
- Wesley MacInnes as Dante Ferstel
- Elysia Rotaru as Diner Waitress
- Nicholas Holmes as Ryan Calcote, Viking's son
- Michael Adamthwaite as Jeff "Santa" Christensen
- Elizabeth Thai as Ahn, Brock's wife
- Gus Halper as Anton "Bone" Dinckel
- Kyle Nobess as Simon "Baby Hawk" Legrew, White Bull's son
- Glen Gould as Duane "War Dog" Michell
- Glenn Wrage as Kurt (voice)
- Michael Bean as Parson
- Nels Lennarson as Chuck Schalm, the janitor at Ryan's school

== Production ==
The participation of actor Liam Neeson, director Hans Petter Moland and producers Michael Shamberg and StudioCanal in making the film, originally titled Hard Powder, was announced in January 2017. In March 2017, Domenick Lombardozzi, Emmy Rossum, Benjamin Hollingsworth, Laura Dern, William Forsythe, Julia Jones, and John Doman joined the cast of the film. The next month, Aleks Paunovic joined.

Principal photography began in March 2017, in Alberta, Canada. Filming also took place in Vancouver and Fernie, British Columbia, and around Winnipeg and Gimli, Manitoba. While Moland had hoped to shoot in the Banff and Jasper national parks, the permit was denied by Parks Canada, which cited concerns about the film's environmental impact, and over the depiction of the First Nations gangsters led by Tom Jackson's character. Jackson provided a letter in support of the project.

== Release ==
In November 2017, Lionsgate acquired U.S. distribution rights to the film. Its title was changed from Hard Powder to Cold Pursuit, and it was released on February 8, 2019 in the United States, and February 22 in the United Kingdom. The film's February 5, 2019, red carpet premiere was canceled because of comments made by Neeson the previous day, regarding a past incident in his life, in which Neeson said "I went out deliberately into black areas in the city looking to be set upon so that I could unleash physical violence."

The film was released on Ultra HD, Blu-ray, DVD and digital download in the United States on May 14, 2019 by Lionsgate Films. The (Region A) Blu-ray is released as a 2-disc Blu-ray and DVD package. Studio Canal released it in the United Kingdom on June 24, 2019.

== Reception ==
=== Box office ===
Cold Pursuit grossed $32.1 million in the United States and Canada, and $44.1 million in other territories, for a worldwide total of $76.2 million, against a production budget of $60 million.

In the United States and Canada, Cold Pursuit was released alongside What Men Want, The Lego Movie 2: The Second Part and The Prodigy, and was projected to gross $7–10 million from 2,630 theaters in its opening weekend. It made $3.6 million on its first day, including $540,000 from Thursday night previews. It went on to debut to $11 million, finishing third, behind The Lego Movie 2 and What Men Want. In its second weekend the film fell 45% to $6 million, finishing sixth, and then $3.3 million in its third weekend, finishing eighth.

=== Critical response ===
On review aggregator website Rotten Tomatoes, the film holds an approval rating of 68% based on 186 reviews, with an average rating of 6.2/10. The website's critical consensus reads, "Cold Pursuit delivers the action audiences expect from a Liam Neeson thriller -- along with humor and a sophisticated streak that make this an uncommonly effective remake." It was also included in the site's list of the best action films of 2019. On Metacritic, which assigns a normalized rating to reviews, the film has a weighted average score of 57 out of 100, based on 39 critics, indicating "mixed or average" reviews. Audiences polled by CinemaScore gave the film an average grade of "B−" on an A+ to F scale, while those at PostTrak gave it an average 3 out of 5 stars and a 42% "definite recommend".

Chris Nashawaty, writing for Entertainment Weekly, delivered a positive review, grading it a "B+":

If [Cold Pursuit] sounds like murder-by-numbers Liam Neeson Mad Libs, well, it kind of is. But what sets Cold Pursuit apart from its predecessors is its tone. It has the jokey, self-amused vibe of an Elmore Leonard novel or one of those arch, wannabe Tarantino knock-offs that sprouted up like toadstools in the wake of Reservoir Dogs and Pulp Fiction and were quickly forgotten. It knows exactly what kind of movie it is, but that doesn't stand in the way of it goosing its bloodbath set pieces with irreverent, off-kilter gallows humor.

Richard Roeper, writing for the Chicago Sun-Times, praised the film, awarding it 3.5 out of 4 stars:

As characters with nicknames such as Sly and Mustang and Smoke and War Dog and Shiv and Drayno enter and often quickly exit the picture, Cold Pursuit moves forward with the assured and deliberate force of Nels' massive snowplow. And with Neeson/Nels at the wheel, Cold Pursuit is one fantastically hot mess of a movie.

=== Accolades ===
Cold Pursuit was nominated for Best Action or Adventure Film at the 45th Saturn Awards, losing to Mission: Impossible – Fallout.

== Controversy ==
Liam Neeson was accused of racism after an interview with The Independent at a press junket for the film, published in February 2019. Neeson explained his character's "primal" anger to the interviewer by recounting an experience he had many years ago. A woman close to him said she had been raped by a stranger, and Neeson asked what color skin the attacker had; after learning the attacker was black, Neeson said that for about a week, he "went up and down areas with a cosh ... hoping some 'black bastard' would come out of a pub and have a go" so that Neeson "could kill him". In the interview, Neeson also said he was "ashamed" to recount the experience and that it was "horrible" that he did what he did. "It's awful ... but I did learn a lesson from it, when I eventually thought, 'What the fuck are you doing?'"

In an appearance on Good Morning America, Neeson elaborated on his experience while denying being a racist, saying the incident occurred nearly 40 years ago, that he asked for physical attributes of the rapist other than race, that he would have done the same if the rapist was "a Scot or a Brit or a Lithuanian", that he had purposely gone into "black areas of the city", and that he "did seek help" from a priest after coming to his senses. Neeson said that the lesson of his experience was "to open up, to talk about these things", as there was still underlying "racism and bigotry" in both the United States and Northern Ireland. The controversy of Neeson's comments led to the cancellation of the red-carpet event for the premiere of the film.
