= In Order of Disappearance =

2014 film

- Film poster
- Directed by: Hans Petter Moland
- Written by: Kim Fupz Aakeson
- Produced by: Stein B. Kvae
- Starring: Stellan Skarsgård
- Cinematography: Philip Øgaard
- Edited by: Jens Christian Fodstad
- Music by: Brian Batz; Kaspar Kaae; Kåre Vestrheim
- Distributed by: Nordisk Film
- Release dates: 10 February 2014 (Berlin); 21 February 2014 (Norway)
- Running time: 115 minutes
- Countries: Norway; Sweden; Denmark
- Languages: Norwegian; Serbian
- Budget: kr30 million
- Box office: $904,446

In Order of Disappearance (Norwegian: Kraftidioten, lit. 'The Moron') is a 2014 action thriller film directed by Hans Petter Moland and starring Stellan Skarsgård. An international co-production between Norway, Sweden, and Denmark, the film premiered in the competition section of the 64th Berlin International Film Festival on 10 February 2014. Cold Pursuit, an English-language remake, also directed by Moland, was released in 2019.

== Plot ==
Nils Dickman is a snow plow driver in the fictional town of Tyos, Norway, just elected citizen of the year. His life, however, is shattered by the death of his son Ingvar, found dead by overdose of heroin. The police do not investigate but Dickman is sure that his son wasn't a drug user. When he is about to kill himself he learns from Finn, his son's friend, that Ingvar was mistakenly killed by a gang of drug dealers who actually intended to kill Finn; Nils begins to hunt for his son's murderers.

He finds Jappe, one of the killers, and kills him after extracting the name of his accomplice, Ronaldo. Ronaldo tells Nils the name of the drug carrier, Strike, before being killed too. After killing Strike, concealing the bodies of the three gangsters and destroying 15 kilos of cocaine, Nils goes in search of the boss of the gang. He contacts his brother Egil, a former criminal now going straight. Egil advises him to hire a hitman to assassinate the powerful chief of criminals, the vegan gangster nicknamed Greven (The Count). Nils hires the Danish-Japanese hitman Kineseren (The Chinaman).

Greven, who has lost three men and a lot of money, blames his competitors, a Serbian mafia family, with whom there has always been a territorial agreement. He sends his henchmen to kidnap one of the gang. The man reveals nothing and Greven kills him, unaware that he is the son of the Serbians' chief, the fearsome Papa. Kineseren asks Greven for a payoff and tells him that he has been hired by a man called Dickman. Greven assumes this is ex-criminal Egil, and goes to him for explanations. Egil understands the situation and allows himself to be executed to save Nils. After multiple complications, there is a gunfight at Nils's workplace in which all the gangsters are killed except Nils and Papa, who drive away together, both satisfied for having their sons avenged.

== Cast ==
- Stellan Skarsgård as Nils Dickman
- Pål Sverre Valheim Hagen as Ole Forsby ("Greven")
- Bruno Ganz as "Papa" Popović
- Birgitte Hjort Sørensen as Marit
- Anders Baasmo Christiansen as Geir
- Hildegun Riise as Gudrun Dickman
- Peter Andersson as Egil Dickman ("Wingman")
- Kristofer Hivju as Stig Erik Smith ("Strike")
- Jan Gunnar Røise as Jan Petter Eriksen ("Jappe")
- Kåre Conradi as Ronny Amundsen ("Ronaldo")
- Jakob Oftebro as Aron Horowitz ("Junior")
- Gard B. Eidsvold as Halldor Emmanuel Torp ("Svela")
- Tobias Santelmann as Finn Heimdahl
- Jon Øigarden as Karsten Petterson
- Jack Sødahl Moland as Rune Forsby
- Sergej Trifunović as Nebojša Mihajlović
- Miodrag Krstović as Dragomir Bogdanović
- Leo Ajkic as Radovan Župan
- Goran Navojec as Stojan Micić
- Damir Babovic as Vuk Jovanović
- David Sakurai as Takashi Claus Nielsen ("The Chinaman")
- Aron Eskeland as Ingvar Dickman
- Atle Antonsen as Reddersen
- Stig Henrik Hoff as experienced police officer
- Adil Halitaj as Miroslav Popović

== Reception ==
On review aggregator Rotten Tomatoes, the film holds an approval rating of 86% based on 63 reviews, with an average rating of 6.9/10. The website's critical consensus reads, "In Order of Disappearance's black comedy doesn't always hit its targets, but on the whole, it still adds up to a sly, entertaining revenge thriller." On Metacritic, which assigns a normalized rating to reviews, the film has a weighted average score of 74 out of 100, based on 20 critics, indicating "generally favorable reviews".

== Adaptation ==
StudioCanal and producer Michael Shamberg produced an English-language remake, Cold Pursuit with the same director, Hans Petter Moland, and starring Liam Neeson. The film was released on 8 February 2019 by Summit Entertainment.
