= Pål Sverre Hagen =

Norwegian actor

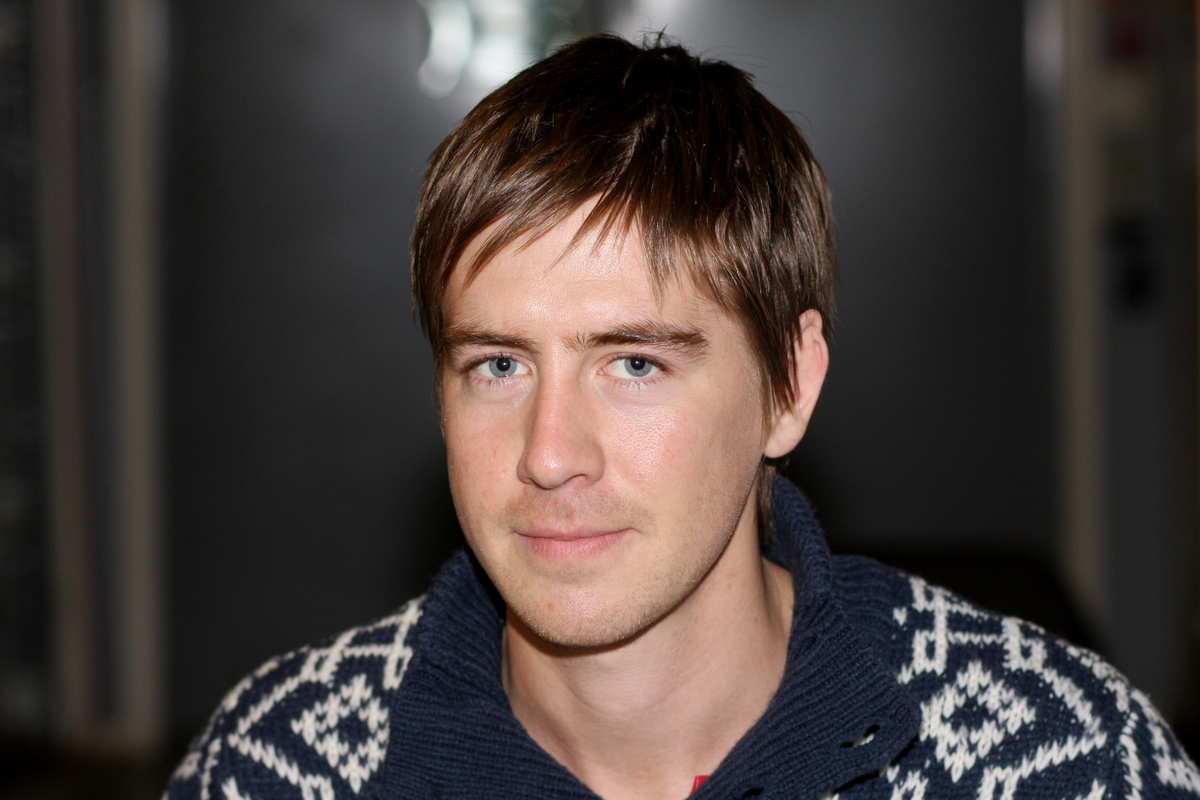
- Hagen in 2010
- Born: Pål Sverre Valheim Hagen; 6 November 1980 (age 46); Stavanger, Norway
- Education: Norwegian National Academy of Theatre
- Occupation: Actor
- Years active: 2003–present
- Family: Roar Hagen (father)

Pål Sverre Valheim Hagen (born 6 November 1980) is a Norwegian stage and screen actor. He is perhaps best known internationally for playing Thor Heyerdahl in the film Kon-Tiki. From 2019 to 2023, Hagen portrayed William in Exit, a series in 3 seasons that described the decadent lives of 4 men in Oslo's finance elites. It became the most streamed in the history of Norwegian national television.

== Early life and education ==
Pål Hagen was born in Stavanger, Norway, the son of Roar Hagen, a Norwegian cartoonist who has long been associated with Norway's largest daily, VG. He studied at the Norwegian National Academy of Theater in Oslo from 2000 to 2003.

== Stage career ==
His stage debut was in 2003 in Frode Grytten's Bikubesong (Beehive Song) at Det Norske Teatret in Oslo.

Hagen went on to play the title roles in Anthon Chekhov's Ivanov and Raskolnikov, based on Fjodor Dostojevski's Crime and punishment, both at Hålogaland Theater.

In 2006 he became an official member of the repertory company at Det Norske Teatret, and performed there in Verdas mest forelska par (World's Most-in-Love Couple), Få meg på, for faen! (Touch Me, For God's Sake!), and Gabriel García Márquez's Ingen skriv til obersten (Nobody Write to the Colonel). These two roles won him the Hedda Award in 2007.

Hagen played Prince Hal in a 3-hour and 40-minute version of William Shakespeare's Henry IV Parts 1 and Part 2 staged in 2008 at Det Norske Teatret.

Regarding his appearance in Henry IV, he said, “This is my first encounter with Shakespeare, and all I can do is admit that I have an overwhelming and massive piece of material ahead of me. Because really understanding the characters and the setting demands a lot more than a script."

He said that the actor whose work meant the most to him was Bjørn Sundquist. “I've learned a lot from him. We're both interested in a kind of energy. An energy that's undefinable, but that's totally essential for expression. It is an important kernel of the kind of acting I want to do. And it's good to meet others who are looking for the same thing.”

In the autumn of 2010 Valheim Hagen played Edmund Tyrone in the Riksteatret's production of Eugene O'Neill's Lang dags ferd mot natt (Long Day's Journey into Night). Liv Ullmann played his mother, Mary Tyrone, and Sundquist played his father, James Tyrone. In an article about this production, a writer for Dagbladet noted that Sundquist had played Falstaff to Valheim Hagen's Prince Hal in 2008, and that they had played father and son the year after in the film Jernanger, “in roles that were too small for their talents.”

In 2014, he played Stavrogin in Demoner 2014, based on Fyodor Dostojevskij's The Devils. The play premiered on February 8 at the National Theatre in Oslo.

== Television and film career ==
Hagen made his film debut in Cry in the Woods (Den som frykter ulven) in 2004. He appeared in several other films, including Erik Poppe's 2008 film Troubled Water (De usynlige). For this film he won the Kanonprisen for best performance by an actor in a leading role. A 2012 article in Filmmagasinet praising Troubled Water as a great Norwegian film gave part of the credit for its excellence to “unbelievably good acting” by Hagen and other members of the cast.

In 2008, in addition to Troubled Water, Hagen appeared in four other well-received films: Cold Lunch (Lønsj), House of Fools (De gales hus), Max Manus, and The Storm in My Heart (Jernanger).

A January 2009 profile in Aftenposten noted that he was in three different movies that were running simultaneously in Oslo cinemas – The Storm in My Heart, Max Manus, and Troubled Water – and was also rehearsing the “surrealistic comedy” Eit lykkeleg sjølvmord at Det Norske Teatret.

In the autumn of 2011 Hagen played the lead role in a four-part, 4-hour Norwegian TV mini-series, Buzz Aldrin, What Happened to You in All the Confusion? (Buzz Aldrin, hvor ble det av deg i alt mylderet?), based on the debut novel by Johan Harstad. He was nominated for a Golden Screen Award for this role.

In 2013 he starred in the family action adventure film Gåten Ragnarok.

In 2014 he played The Count in Hans Petter Moland's action thriller film In Order of Disappearance alongside Stellan Skarsgård and Bruno Ganz. He was nominated for the Amanda Award and won best actor in the Gut Buster Comedy feature category at Austin Fantastic Fest for the role.

He continued his collaboration with Hans Petter Moland in Danish thriller Conspiracy of Faith in 2016.

In early 2017 Hagen starred alongside Sven Nordin in the thriller series Valkyrien. In summer 2017 it was screened in the UK on Channel 4. He won a Golden Screen Award for his performance.

He played ice skating legend Sonja Henies' husband Niels Onstad in the biopic Sonja in 2018.

In February 2019 Amundsen, based on the life of polar explorer Roald Amundsen, opened in Norwegian cinemas. Hagen plays Roald Amundsen in the film directed by Espen Sandberg.

=== Kon-Tiki ===
Hagen came to prominence playing explorer Thor Heyerdahl in the 2012 film Kon-Tiki, based on Heyerdahl's book. An October 2011 article in VG about the making of the film reported that "the filmmakers had to pinch their arms when Pål Sverre Hagen (31) pulled off Heyerdahl's characteristic Larvik English for the first time. “We all got chills. It was a very special experience,” said director Espen Sandberg. The very first scene Hagen did as Heyerdahl showed him giving a lecture in Washington, D.C., under the auspices of the National Geographic Society, and Sandberg said that he “did it so convincingly that the film-makers stood there open-mouthed,” feeling “that it was Thor standing in front of us. Of course I knew it was Pål Sverre, but sometimes magic happens, and fortunately we managed to capture it."

A Dagsavisen profile of Hagen in August 2012 in connection with the release of Kon-Tiki said that he had “nearly perfected” the distinctive way in which Thor Heyerdahl spoke English. He explained that “It was a conscious choice to speak English the way he did. The most important thing for me is that those who see it get a kind of 'feeling for Thor.' For very many people, the way he spoke is something they remember well. He had a special 'sound'!"

He said he had considered it a challenge to “find” the real Heyerdahl, as the explorer had been a “master” at projecting a public image. “It's important to remember that when the film is taking place, Thor Heyerdahl hadn't become a legend yet. He hadn't become Heyerdahl yet.”

Kon-Tiki was chosen by the Motion Picture Academy of Arts and Sciences as one of five nominees for its award for best foreign language film of 2012. In explaining its choice, the Academy singled out Hagen for praise, saying that his performance created a feeling of intimacy in a film with a very broad scope. The film was also nominated for a Golden Globe.

== Personal life ==
Hagen is based in Oslo and Stockholm. He said that he once planned to be a marine biologist.

== Filmography ==
Film
| Year | Title | Role | Notes |
|---|---|---|---|
| 2004 | Cry in the Woods | Politivakt | |
| 2006 | Blokk B | Him | short |
| 2006 | Roswell Enterprises | William | short |
| 2006 | Miracle | Assistant | |
| 2008 | Cold Lunch | Caretaker | |
| 2008 | De gales hus | Tussi | |
| 2008 | Troubled Water | Jan Thomas | |
| 2008 | Max Manus; Man Of War | Roy Nilsen | |
| 2009 | The Storm in My Heart | Kris | |
| 2009 | Amor | Thomas | short |
| 2011 | I Travel Alone | Hasse Ognatun | |
| 2012 | Kon-Tiki | Thor Heyerdahl | |
| 2013 | Gåten Ragnarok | Sigurd Svendsen | |
| 2014 | In Order of Disappearance | Greven | |
| 2016 | The Last King | Gisle | |
| 2016 | Beyond Sleep | Arne | |
| 2016 | A Conspiracy of Faith | Johannes | Flaskepost fra P in Danish |
| 2017 | What Happened to Monday | Jerry | |
| 2019 | Out Stealing Horses | | |
| 2019 | Amundsen | Roald Amundsen | |
| 2021 | The Middle Man | Frank Farrelli | |
| 2022 | Everybody Hates Johan | Johan Grande | |
| 2026 | Den Hemmelige Kvinde | Joachim | |

Television
| Year | Title | Role | Notes |
|---|---|---|---|
| 2006 | Sejer - Svarte sekunder | Tomme | Mini-series |
| 2010-2011 | Buzz Aldrin, hvor ble det av deg i alt mylderet? | Matthias | |
| 2017 | Valkyrien | Leif | |
| 2019 | Exit | William Bergvik | |
| 2021 | Furia | Asgeir | |
| 2021 | Beforeigners | Doctorand | |
| 2022 | Dag og natt | Jerry (Gjermund) | |
| 2025 | The Couple Next Door | Isak | |

== Awards and nominations ==
| Year | Nominated work | Award | Result |
|---|---|---|---|
| 2007 | Verdas mest forelska par | Heddaprisen Award for Best Supporting Actor | Won |
| 2007 | Ingen skriv til obersten | Heddaprisen Award for Best Supporting Actor | Won |
| 2008 | Troubled Water | Kanonprisen Award for Best Actor in a Leading Role | Won |
| 2009 | The Storm in My Heart | Kanonprisen Award for Best Supporting Actor | Won |

| Year | Organization | Category | Nominee(s) | Result | Ref. |
|---|---|---|---|---|---|
| 2017 | Gullruten | Best Actor, TV Drama | Himself for Valkyrien | Won | |

- The citation for the Heddaprisen Award praised Valheim Hagen's “imaginative skill at creating characters that... expresses itself in a vigorous physical expressiveness.”
