= The Middle Man (film) =

2021 comedy film

- Directed by: Bent Hamer
- Written by: Bent Hamer
- Based on: Sluk by Lars Saabye Christensen
- Produced by: Bent Hamer; Simone Urdl; Jamie Manning; Jennifer Weiss; Reinhard Brundig; Nina Frese; Jacob Jarek
- Starring: Pål Sverre Hagen; Tuva Novotny
- Cinematography: John Christian Rosenlund
- Edited by: Anders Refn
- Production companies: Bulbul Film; The Film Farm; Pandora Film; Profile Pictures
- Distributed by: levelFILM; Pandora Film Verleih
- Release date: September 12, 2021 (TIFF)
- Running time: 95 minutes
- Countries: Canada; Germany; Norway
- Language: English

The Middle Man is a 2021 black comedy film, directed by Bent Hamer. An adaptation of Lars Saabye Christensen's 2012 novel Sluk, it is set in a small town that is so economically depressed that the municipality hires Frank Farrelli (Pål Sverre Hagen) as a middle man for the increasingly frequent task of delivering bad news to inhabitants.

== Plot ==
The town of Karmack seeing a persistent streak of fatal accidents needs to fill the position of a Middle Man, a person taking care of casualty notification. Frank Farrelli, having been unemployed for long enough and living with his mother, gets the job and the first opportunity to attend a notification in his official capacity arrives.

As weeks without accidents go by, Frank and his best friend Steve Miller go to a bar. There Bob Spencer starts a petty argument with Steve and gives him a blow, who in turn experiences a severe traumatic brain injury and ends up in a coma. Doctors predict a very poor outcome associated with post-coma unresponsiveness. The next day Frank notifies Steve’s father Martin.

Martin dies by the bedside of his son and Frank inherits his property, including power of attorney about Steve. In light of the Steve’s predicted poor outcome, Frank decides to stop life-sustaining treatment. Eventually, in exchange of favors, Frank asks Arthur Clintstone to knock up Bob, seeing him ultimately responsible for Steve’s death. Arthur accidentally happens to kill Bob, though.

Frank and Arthur covering up the homicide bring the corpse to Martin’s former home and set it on fire. To the police it appears to be an accident, but Frank’s mother, having smelt the gas they used as a fire accelerant, does not believe so. She discloses to Frank that she neither believed the death of Frank’s father was an accident, but suspected Frank of foul play. The two become estranged: “Frank, I don’t want to have anything more to do with you.”

== Cast ==
Despite setting in the USA, the movie features Norwegian, Swedish and Canadian actors.

- Pål Sverre Hagen as Frank Farrelli
- Nicolas Bro as Pastor
- Trond Fausa Aurvåg as Bob Spencer
- Paul Gross as The Sheriff
- Tuva Novotny as Blenda Johnson
- Nina Andresen Borud as Frank’s Mother
- Rossif Sutherland as Steve Miller
- Aksel Hennie as Arthur Clintstone
- Kenneth Welsh (in his final film role) as Martin Miller

Its cast also includes Don McKellar, Sheila McCarthy, Bill Lake, Rosalie Chilelli and Josiane McCartney.

== Production ==
The film was shot in 2019, in both Germany and Sault Ste. Marie, Ontario. It is a coproduction of companies from Norway, Germany, Denmark and Canada.

== Release ==
The film premiered at the 2021 Toronto International Film Festival on September 12, 2021, before having its commercial premiere in Norway on September 17.
