= Everybody Hates Johan =

2022 Norwegian film

- Directed by: Hallvar Witzø
- Starring: Pål Sverre Hagen
- Release date: 25 March 2022
- Running time: 93 minutes
- Country: Norway
- Language: Norwegian

Everybody Hates Johan (Norwegian: Alle hater Johan) is a 2022 Norwegian dark comedy directed by Hallvar Witzø.

The film was released on 25 March 2022.

== Cast ==
- Pål Sverre Hagen - Johan Grande
- Ingrid Bolsø Berdal - Solvor
- Vee Vimolmal - Pey
- John Brungot - postman Frode
- Ine Jansen - Ella
- Paul-Ottar Haga - Stor-Johan
- Trond-Ove Skrødal - Onkel Iver
- Ingunn Beate Øyen - Tante Magnhild
- Hermann Sabado - Martin Nguyen Grande
- Raymond Balstad - Balstad
- Tore Berntzen Granås - Lars
- Vetle Røsten Granås - Lars Ungdom
- Sofie Sivertsen Hernes - Anna
- Jonas Ledang - Åge Aleksandersen
- Adrien Leknes - Johan Barn
- Marianne Meløy - Laila
- Bjørn Myrene - Dokumentmappemannen
- Gabija Petruskaite - Solvor Barn

== Production ==
=== Filming ===
The movie was filmed in the small fishing village of Titran in Trøndelag, Norway.

== Reception ==
The film won the award for Best Music, as well as Best Mask / Makeup at the Amanda Awards.

The film has a 6.8/10 on IMDb, a 100% on the popcorn meter on Rotten Tomatoes, and a 3.5/5 on Letterboxd.
