= Hildegun Riise =

Norwegian actress (born 1958)

- Born: December 19, 1958 (age 67); Strandebarm Municipality, Norway
- Occupation: Actress
- Awards: Amanda Award for best actress (2001)

Hildegun Riise (born December 19, 1958) is a Norwegian actress.

Riise was born in Strandebarm Municipality, Norway. In 2001 she received the Amanda Award for best actress for her performance in Detektor.

== Filmography ==
- 1986/1989: Eventyrstund med Janosch (TV series, Norwegian narrator)
- 1990: Landstrykere as Miss Ellingsen
- 1991: For dagene er onde as Kjersti
- 1992: Giftige løgner as Åsa
- 1992: Flaggermusvinger as Gertrud
- 1994: Vestavind (TV series) as Agnes
- 1996: Søndagsengler as Mrs. Tunheim
- 2000: Detektor as Daniel's mother
- 2001: Det største i verden as Petra's mother
- 2002: Himmelfall as Vigdis
- 2004: Min misunnelige frisør as Susie
- 2006: Sejer – Svarte sekunder (TV series) as Ruth
- 2006: Kjøter (TV series)
- 2008: De gales hus as the angel
- 2014: Kraftidioten as Gudrun Dickman
- 2014: 1001 gram as Wenche
- 2015: Kampen for tilværelsen (TV series)
