= The Other Side of Sunday =

- Directed by: Berit Nesheim
- Written by: Berit Nesheim
- Starring: Marie Theisen
- Release date: 9 February 1996
- Running time: 103 minutes
- Country: Norway
- Language: Norwegian

The Other Side of Sunday (Norwegian: Søndagsengler) is a 1996 Norwegian film directed by Berit Nesheim, starring Marie Theisen and Bjørn Sundquist. The film was the most-viewed film in Norway in 1996 and was nominated for an Academy Award for Best Foreign Language Film in 1997.

== Plot ==
The fourteen-year-old girl Maria, in puberty, is the daughter of the priest Johannes Faren. She grows up in the 1950s with her parents in a strictly religious household in a small town. Her strict father prohibits her from almost everything: playing the piano, wearing modern clothing, or using cosmetics, unlike her peers. While other girls enjoy themselves, she must attend church regularly, dressed modestly, even during the week.

Her mother falls ill for an extended period and needs treatment in a hospital, during which time Maria seizes the opportunity to lead a more carefree life. She decides to spend a weekend in a cabin with a few teenagers. During their stay, one of the boys gets close to her, but Maria is overwhelmed by the situation and runs home. Even when her mother returns home later, she decides to continue spending her leisure time with her friends, causing renewed conflicts with her moralizing father, who fears for his daughter's virtues and sees her on the path to sin.

Mrs. Tunheim, who is also active in the church community but is considered an outsider, is the only person she can confide in and supports her in this decision. At the same time, they also share some common secrets and find joy in exchanging physical affection. Eventually, the priest becomes aware of this and tries to persuade Maria. However, Maria doesn't tell anyone about the incident. When Mrs. Tunheim subsequently commits suicide, Maria is initially devastated.

Despite all her despair, she decides to gather new courage for life and bids farewell to her beloved friend on the banks of the river where Mrs. Tunheim drowned, saying to her, "Everything between us will remain as it was." At the end of the film, Maria walks along the road on foot while the song "You're nobody till somebody loves you" plays in the background, a melody echoing themes of freedom and self-discovery.

== Cast ==
- Marie Theisen as Maria
- Hildegun Riise as Mrs. Tunheim
- Bjørn Sundquist as Johannes, her Father
- Sylvia Salvesen as Moren
- Martin Dahl Garfalk as Olav
- Ina Sofie Brodahl as Anna
- Ann Kristin Rasmussen as Birgit

== Production ==
When this movie was nominated for an Oscar in the category "best foreign language film", Marie Theisen, who was 15 years old during filming, said that she realized her full nude swimming scene was difficult to accept for the American audience, but she thought it was well done and absolutely necessary for the context.

== See also ==
- List of submissions to the 69th Academy Awards for Best Foreign Language Film
- List of Norwegian submissions for the Academy Award for Best Foreign Language Film
