= 2007 Bangladesh cartoon controversy =

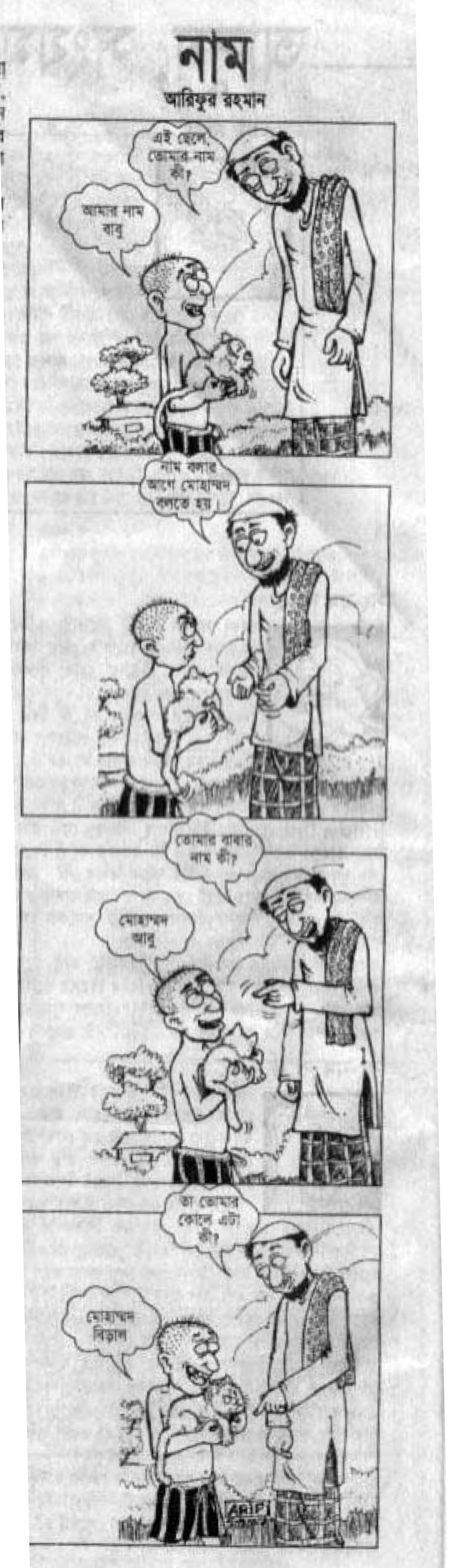
The cartoon which caused the controversy

The 2007 Bangladesh cartoon controversy began after an editorial cartoon was published in the 431st edition of Alpin, a featured supplement of the Bangladeshi newspaper Prothom Alo, on 17 September 2007. The cartoon featured a conversation between an elderly man and a boy culminating in the boy making a joke using the name of the Islamic prophet Muhammad. Bangladeshi Muslim organisations, who objected to the cartoon, responded by holding public protests which led to violence and street clashes, even though such demonstrations have been banned by the interim caretaker government. Arifur Rahman, the author of the cartoon, was arrested and detained while the publishers have publicly apologised.

== Controversy ==
On 17 September 2007, a cartoon titled Naam (Name) was published in the 431st edition of Alpin. The cartoon, by 20-year-old cartoonist Arifur Rahman, featured a conversation between an elderly man and a boy. The controversy regarded the text rather than the pictures as had been the case in previous such incidents. When the boy was asked what his name was, he omitted the prefix Muhammad, used by some Muslims to show respect to the Islamic prophet Muhammad. The elder informed him that he should use the prefix in front of all names. In the final strip, the man asked the boy what was in his lap to which he replied "Muhammad cat".

The country's mainly Muslim population regarded the publication of the cartoon in their holy month of Ramadhan as a deliberate attempt to ridicule Muhammad, who is highly revered by Muslims, and ignite unrest in the country. Demonstrations were held the following day in major cities, even though such protests were made unlawful by the interim caretaker government earlier in 2007. Formal representations were made by Muslim leaders to the government during meetings held on 18 September with calls for revoking the license of the newspaper, Prothom Alo. The government banned the sale of the 431st issue and instructed the authorities to seize all printed copies while urging the public to exercise self-restraint, and arrested Arifur Rahman.

In a statement released by Prothom Alo, editor Matiur Rahman apologised, expressing regret for publishing the cartoon. He stated that the "unedited, unapproved and unacceptable" cartoon is being withdrawn and would be "taking actions against the persons responsible". However, religious clerics of the country continued their outcry and demanded the arrest of Matiur Rahman and Prothom Alo's publisher, Mahfuz Anam.

== Rahman's trial ==
In 2007, after publishing the cartoon large demonstrations were held in Bangladesh and the cartoonist Arifur Rahman was indicted and tried multiple times. Rahman was jailed under Bangladesh's emergency laws.

=== Dhaka court ===
Rahman was charged with "hurting religious sentiments" under Penal Code Section 295A and given a thirty-day detention order; this was later extended for an additional three months. Amnesty International designated Rahman a prisoner of conscience and called for his "immediate and unconditional release". Reporters Without Borders also issued a statement on his behalf calling for his release, saying, "The government should not yield to pressure from extremist leaders who are trying to politicise the case. Rahman should not be made a scapegoat. He must be freed." The cartoonist was arrested for six months and two days, arrested 18 September 2007, and released by court order on 20 March 2008, after the police officer who filed a case against him repeatedly failed to appear in court.

=== Jessore court ===
On 12 November 2009, a Jessore court was handed down two months of rigorous imprisonment to cartoonist Arifur Rahman, also have to pay Tk 500 in fine or another seven days in prison.

== See also ==
- Editorial cartoon § Controversies
- Jyllands-Posten Muhammad cartoons controversy
- Islam and blasphemy
