= Egil Nyhus =

Norwegian illustrator

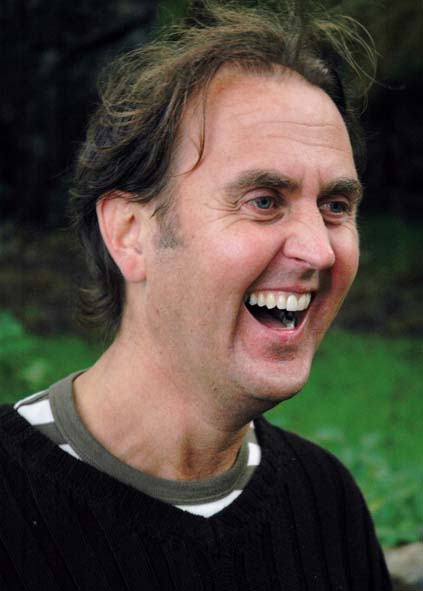
Egil Nyhus, 2005.

Egil Nyhus (born 23 January 1962) is a Norwegian illustrator.

He was born in Tønsberg as the twin brother of illustrator/writer Svein Nyhus. He took his education at the Norwegian National Academy of Craft and Art Industry from 1981 to 1985, worked as a newspaper illustrator in Tønsbergs Blad from 1986 to 1987 and Romerikes Blad from 1987. He has also illustrated children's picture books, among them several titles about Captain Sabertooth and books written by Tor Åge Bringsværd.

== Honours and awards ==
- 1998: The Norwegian Editorial Cartoon of the Year (Årets avistegning) for a caricature portrait of Lars Sponheim
- 2012: GRAND PRIX ex-aequo in World Press Cartoon Sintra 2012 for a caricature of Dominique Strauss-Kahn
- 2013: The Norwegian Editorial Cartoon of the Year (Årets avistegning) 2011-2012 for a caricature portrait of Anders Behring Breivik

Awards
Preceded by Roar Hagen	Editorial Cartoon of the Year in Norway; 1998	Succeeded by Finn Graff (not awarded 1999)
Preceded by David Rowe	GRAND PRIX ex-aequo in World Press Cartoon Sintra 2012	Succeeded by Kountouris
Preceded by Siri Dokken	Editorial Cartoon of the Year in Norway; 2011-2012	Succeeded by
