= Roar Hagen =

Norwegian illustrator (born 1954)

Roar Hagen (born 15 April 1954) is a Norwegian illustrator.

== Biography ==
He was born in Ørsta Municipality, and started his newspaper career in Sunnmørsposten in 1975. He went on to Stavanger Aftenblad from 1978 to 1986 and Verdens Gang since 1986. Through his connection to the Cartoonists & Writers Syndicate in New York City he has been published in Die Zeit, International Herald Tribune, Der Spiegel, Newsweek, Time Magazine and the like. He won the Editorial Cartoon of the Year award in 1997. He has also illustrated books.

He is the father of actor Pål Sverre Valheim Hagen.

Awards
Preceded by first recipient	Editorial Cartoon of the Year in Norway; 1997	Succeeded by Egil Nyhus
