= Aukrust =

Aukrust is a surname. Notable people with the surname include:

- Kjell Aukrust (1920–2002), Norwegian poet and artist, son of Lars
- Lars Olsen Aukrust (1886–1965), Norwegian farmer and politician
- Odd Aukrust (1915–2008), Norwegian author and economist, son of Lars
- Olav Aukrust (1883–1929), Norwegian poet, brother of Lars
- Ronny Aukrust (born 1975), Norwegian politician
