= Rasmus A. Sivertsen =

Norwegian film director

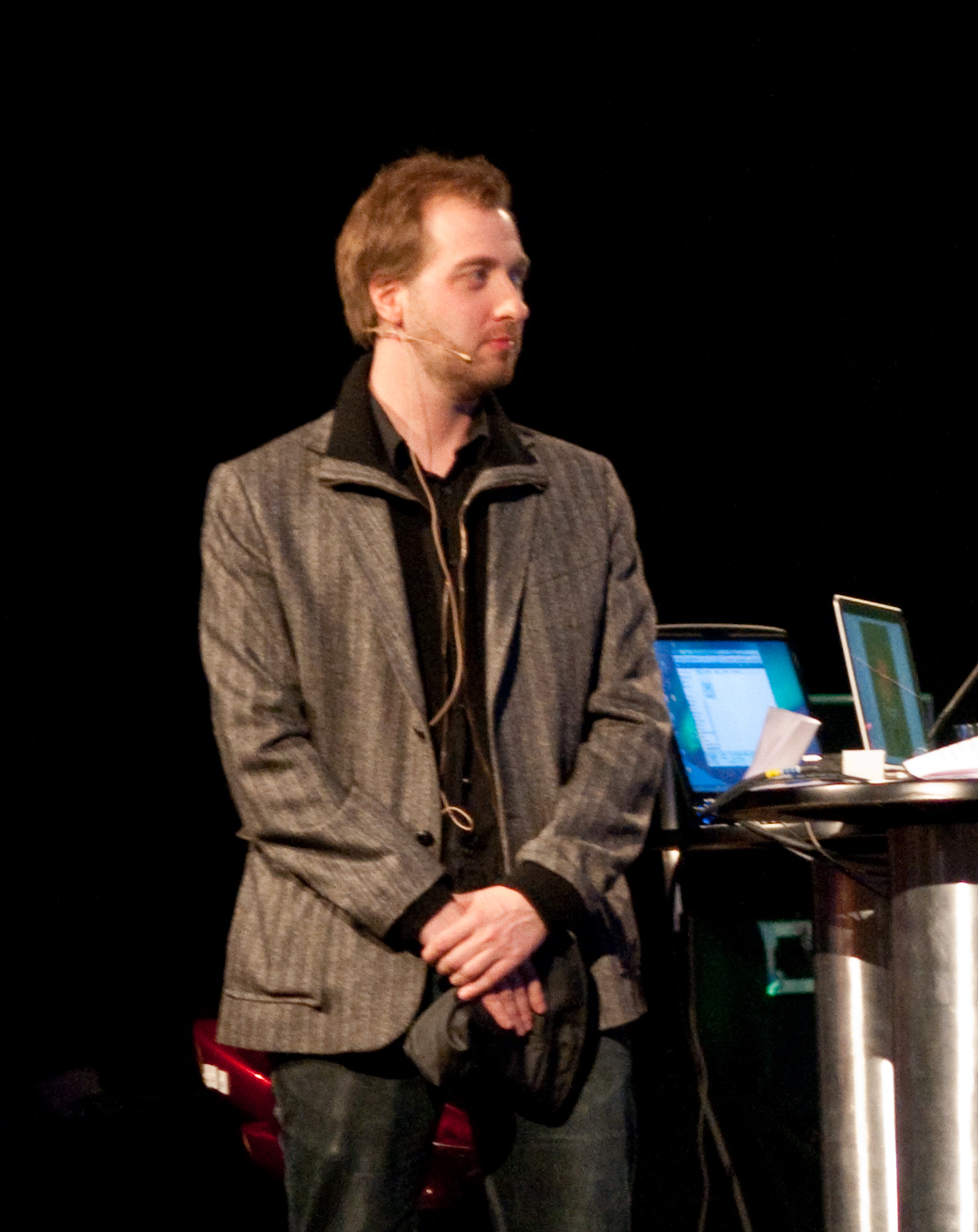
- Sivertsen in 2010 promoting Fanthomas
- Born: August 26, 1972; Inderøy Municipality, Nord-Trøndelag, Norway
- Occupations: Film director; editor; producer; animator; television director
- Years active: 2001–present

Rasmus Andre Sivertsen (26 September 1972, Inderøy Municipality) is a Norwegian film director, editor, producer, animator and former television director. He is a co-owner of film production company Qvisten Animation.

== Life and career ==
Rasmus Andre Sivertsen was born on 26 September 1972 in Inderøy Municipality in Nord-Trøndelag county, Norway. He studied animation at Volda University College in Møre og Romsdal and graduated in 1995. He made his directorial debut in 2001 with the short film Guggen - The Big Cheese, and made his feature film directorial debut as a co-director of Captain Sabertooth (2003), based on the titular franchise. In 2008, he directed Kurt turns Evil for Qvisten Animation, and later directed two films based on the Pelle Politibil children's character, known as Ploddy in English dubbed media: Ploddy the Police Car Makes a Splash (2009) and Ploddy the Police Car on the Case (2013). In Norway, the films grossed $1,524,396 from 120,816 admissions and $2,102,960 from 158,029 admissions respectively.

Sivertsen directed a trilogy of films based on the characters from Kjell Aukrust's Flåklypa universe, with Solan and Ludvig (named Louis and Luca in English dubbed media) being the principal focus of the films. The first film, Solan and Ludvig: Christmas in Pinchcliffe, was released in 2013 and grossed $12,313,639 internationally. The second film Louis and Luca – The Big Cheese Race, was released in 2015, and received 241,472 admissions in Norwegian cinemas. The final film Louis & Luca - Mission to the Moon, was released in 2018, and grossed $4,838,873 from 422,796 admissions, making it the third highest-grossing film in Norway of that year. All three films received positive reviews, with praise particularly aimed at the films' humour and animation, but with criticisms focused on their conventionality.

== Filmography ==
=== Feature films ===
Year	Film	Credit	Ref
2003	Captain Sabertooth; Kaptein Sabeltann	Co-director	
2008	Kurt Turns Evil; Kurt blir grusom	Director	
2009	Ploddy the Police Car Makes a Splash; Pelle Politibil går i vannet	Director	
2013	Ploddy the Police Car on the Case; Pelle Politibil på sporet	Director	
2013	Louis & Luca and the Snow Machine; Solan og Ludvig – Jul i Flåklypa	Director	
2015	Louis and Luca – The Big Cheese Race; Solan og Ludvig – Herfra til Flåklypa	Director	
2015	Two Buddies and a Badger; Knutsen & Ludvigsen og den fæle Rasputin	Director	
2016	In the Forest of Huckybucky; Dyrene i Hakkebakkeskogen	Director	
2018	Louis & Luca - Mission to the Moon; Månelyst i Flåklypa	Director	
2018	Cattle Hill; KuToppen	Executive producer	
2019	Captain Sabertooth and the Magic Diamond; Kaptein Sabeltann og den magiske diamant	Director	
2022	Just Super; Helt Super	Director	
2024	Spermageddon	Co-director	

=== Television shows ===
Year	Show	Episodes	Ref
1998	Lisa		
2007	KuToppen		
2009	Fanthomas		

=== Additional ===
- Fanthomas, director for 2D cartoon comedy series
