= Bjarne Sandemose =

Norwegian cinematographer (1924–2013)

Bjarne Walter William Sandemose (17 April 1924 – 21 April 2013) was a Norwegian of Danish descent.

He was born in Denmark as a son of writer Aksel Sandemose. The family migrated to Norway in 1929. He is best known for his cooperation with Ivo Caprino, specifically with building the prop car Il Tempo Gigante for the movie Pinchcliffe Grand Prix, for many years Norway's best grossing film. Sandemose is also credited for building the Ivo Caprinos Supervideograf. Sandemose and Caprino were jointly awarded the Honorary Amanda Award in 1995.

Sandemose was the father of Iben Sandemose, father-in-law of Trond Brænne, and maternal grandfather of Mikkel Sandemose. He died in April 2013 at Lille Tøyen caring center.
