= Sandemose =

Sandemose is a surname. Notable people with the surname include:

- Aksel Sandemose (1899–1965), Danish-Norwegian writer
- Bjarne Sandemose (1924–2013), Norwegian cinematographer of Danish descent
- Iben Sandemose (born 1950), Norwegian illustrator, children's writer, playwright and biographer
