= Louis & Luca - Mission to the Moon =

2018 Norwegian stop motion film

- Norwegian theatrical release poster
- Norwegian: Månelyst i Flåklypa
- Directed by: Rasmus A. Sivertsen
- Screenplay by: Karsten Fullu
- Produced by: Cornelia Boysen; Synnøve Hørsdal
- Edited by: Rasmus A. Siversten; Zaklina Stojcevska
- Music by: Knut Avenstroup Haugen
- Production companies: Qvisten Animation; Maipo Film
- Distributed by: Nordic Film Distribution
- Release date: 21 September 2018
- Running time: 80 minutes
- Country: Norway
- Language: Norwegian
- Budget: 47 million NOK
- Box office: $4,957,487

Louis & Luca - Mission to the Moon (Norwegian: Månelyst i Flåklypa, lit. 'Moon desire in Flåklypa') is a 2018 Norwegian stop motion animated film directed by Rasmus A. Sivertsen from a screenplay by Karsten Fullu, based on the characters by Kjell Aukrust. A sequel to Solan og Ludvig – Herfra til Flåklypa (2015), it is the fourth and so far final stop motion animated film based on Aukrust's Flåklypa universe, and the fifth film overall. The film is a co-production between Qvisten Animation and Maipo Film, and was released in Norway on 21 September 2018, distributed by Nordic Film Distribution. It grossed $4,957,487 worldwide and was met with generally positive reviews.

== Premise ==
Louis and Reodor decide to build a rocket to fly to the Moon on behalf of Norway, with the help of Vigfus Skonken. However, Vigfus secretly wants to collect the Moon dust, which contains a rare substance he calls "Vigfusium".

== Voice cast ==
The Norwegian voice cast for the film:

- Kari-Ann Grønsund as Louis Gundersen
- Trond Høvik as Luca
- Sjølsvik as Reodor Felgen
- Hege Schøyen as Enkefru Stengelføhn-Glad
- Steinar Sagen as Emanuel Desperados
- Fridtjov Såheim as Ollvar O. Kleppvold
- Bjarte Hjelmeland as Olram Slåpen
- John Brungot as Melvind Snerken
- Kåre Conradi as Frimand Pløsen
- Christine Hope as Nyhetsoppleser
- Ingar Helge Gimle as Vigfus Skonken

== Production ==
The film received a funding grant of 15.5 million Norwegian krone (US$1.7 million) from the Norwegian Film Institute in September 2015, contributing to its total budget of 47 million krone (US$5.2 million). The entire film took 120,000 still images.

== Release ==
Louis & Luca - Mission to the Moon was released in Norway on 21 September 2018. It opened with $1,098,555, for a total gross of $4,838,873 from 422,796 admissions, making it the second highest-grossing film in Norway from 2018. It had a worldwide gross of $4,957,487. Critically, the film received positive reviews, with particular praise aimed at its humour and animation, but with criticisms focused on its conventionality.
