= Police Patrol =

Police Patrol may refer to:

- The Police Patrol, a 1925 American silent crime film
- Riot Squad (1933 film), also released as Police Patrol, an American Pre-Code film
- Ploddy the Police Car Makes a Splash, also released as Police Patrol, a 2009 Norwegian animated film
