= Louis and Luca – The Big Cheese Race =

2015 Norwegian stop motion film

- Norwegian: Solan og Ludvig – Herfra til Flåklypa
- Directed by: Rasmus A. Sivertsen
- Screenplay by: Karsten Fullu
- Produced by: Cornelia Boysen; Ove Heiborg; Synnøve Hørsdal
- Music by: Knut Avenstroup Haugen
- Production companies: Qvisten Animation; Maipo Film; Kari and Kjell Aukrust's Foundation
- Distributed by: Nordic Film Distribution
- Release date: 25 December 2015
- Running time: 78 minutes
- Country: Norway
- Language: Norwegian

Louis and Luca – The Big Cheese Race (Norwegian: Solan og Ludvig – Herfra til Flåklypa) is a 2015 Norwegian stop motion animated film directed by Rasmus A. Sivertsen from a screenplay by Karsten Fullu, based on the characters by Kjell Aukrust. A sequel to Solan and Ludvig: Christmas in Pinchcliffe (2013), it is the second film in a trilogy of stop motion animated films based on Aukrust's Flåklypa universe, and the fourth film overall. A co-production between Qvisten Animation and Maipo Film, with support and input from the Kari and Kjell Aukrust's Foundation, Louis and Luca – The Big Cheese Race was released in Norwegian cinemas on 25 December 2015, where it received 241,472 admissions. It was followed by Louis & Luca - Mission to the Moon (2018), the final film in Sivertsen's trilogy.

== Voice cast ==
Norwegian voice cast:

- Kari-Ann Grønsund as Solan Gundersen (Louis), an anthropomorphic magpie.
- Trond Høvik as Ludvig (Luca), an anthropomorphic hedgehog.
- Per Skjølsvik as Reodor Felgen
- Fridtjov Såheim as Ollvar O. Kleppvold
- Bjarte Hjelmeland as Olram Slåpen
- Steinar Sagen as Emanuel Desperados
- Kåre Conradi as Frimand Pløsen
- John Brungot as Melvind and an elderly man

== Release ==
Louis and Luca – The Big Cheese Race was released in Norwegian cinemas on 25 December 2015, and received 241,472 admissions. It was distributed by Nordic Film Distribution.
