= In the Forest of Huckybucky =

Norwegian animated film

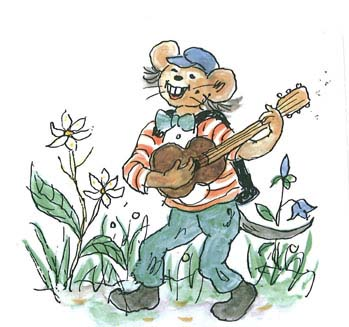
- Norwegian: Dyrene i Hakkebakkeskogen
- Directed by: Rasmus A. Sivertsen
- Screenplay by: Karsten Fullu
- Based on: Thorbjørn Egners Claus Climbermouse and the other animals in the Huckybucky forest
- Produced by: Ove Heiborg; Elisabeth Opdal; Eirik Smidesang Slåen
- Cinematography: Morten Skallerud; Janne K. Hansen
- Music by: Thorbjørn Egner; Gaute Storås; Katzenjammer
- Production company: Qvisten Animation
- Distributed by: SF Norge
- Release date: 25 December 2016
- Running time: 75 minutes
- Country: Norway
- Language: Norwegian
- Box office: $2,262,755

In the Forest of Huckybucky (Norwegian: Dyrene i Hakkebakkeskogen) is a 2016 Norwegian stop-motion animated musical film adaptation of the 1953 children's book Claus Climbermouse and the other animals in the Huckybucky forest by Thorbjørn Egner, directed by Rasmus A. Sivertsen and written by Karsten Fullu.

Released in Norwegian cinemas on 25 December 2016, it was produced by Qvisten Animation.

== Voice cast ==
- Espen Bråten Kristoffersen as Klatremus (Claus Climbermouse)
- Wenche Myhre as Bestemor Skogmus (Grandma Woodmouse)
- Nils Jørgen Kaalstad as Morten Skogmus (Morten Woodmouse)
- Henriette Faye-Schjøll as Stabbursmusa (Storehouse Mouse)
- Stig Henrik Hoff as Mikkel Rev (Marvin the Fox)
- Jan Martin Johnsen as Bakemester Harepus and Hannibal (Mister Hare and Hannibal)
- Jakob Schøyen Andersen as Bakergutten (Bobo)
- Ivar Nørve as Bamsefar (Father Bear)
- Marit Synnøve Berg as Bjørnemor (Mother Bear)
- Andreas Alnes as Brumlemann (Bruin)
- Steinar Sagen as Mannen and Elgen (Moose and Farmer)
- Marit Andreassen as Kona (Farmer's Wife)
- Frank Kjosås as Ekorn-Jensen and Kråke-Per (Pa Squirrel and Mr. Crow)
- Eira Elise Øverås as Ekornbarnet Lise (Lisa Squirrel)
- Halvor Rasmussen Tverdal as Ekornbarnet Tom (Tom Squirrel)
- Albertine Engelstad as Ekornbarnet Peter (Peter Squirrel)
- Egil Hegerberg as Petter Pinnsvin (Horace Hedgehog)
- Katzenjammer as Fuglefamilien

== Release ==
In the Forest of Huckybucky was released in Norwegian cinemas on 25 December 2016 by SF Norge. It grossed NOK 22,207,627 ($2,262,755) from 225,702 admissions, making it the 19th highest-grossing film in Norway of 2016.
