= Fanthomas =

2D cartoon comedy series

Fanthomas is a Norwegian 2D cartoon comedy series, created and written by Anders Bye and Jesper Sundnes and directed by Rasmus Sivertsen. It was produced by Qvisten Animation for VGTV. It centers around a cartoon version of the Norwegian Hollywood makeup artist Jan Thomas Mørch Husby and his boyfriend Christoffer. The two have secret identities, as crime-fighting super heroes. In each episode the duo fights a new Norwegian celebrity, such as Anne Kat Hæland, Alexander Rybak, Eyvind Hellstrøm, Mira Craig and Petter Stordalen. Plots include Fanthomas being fed up with Alexander Rybak's song Fairytale and going as far as Siberia to get away from it; fighting over a role with Norwegian actor Aksel Hennie; and trying to save Barack Obama's ears from a very clumsy hair stylist right before the handing out of the Nobel Peace Prize.

The show can be viewed by the public at www.vgtv.no/fanthomas. As of 2010, the episodes have been viewed over 10 million times.

The show's name is a play on the American comic The Phantom. The Phantom in Norwegian is Fantomet; and Fanthomas thereby is a merging of this comic's name and the name Jan Thomas.
