= Ingeborg Møller =

Norwegian writer (1878–1964)

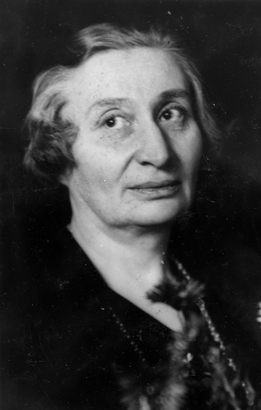
Ingeborg Møller, c. 1933

Ingeborg Møller (29 December 1878 – 18 February 1964) was a Norwegian teacher, playwright, novelist and biographer.

== Biography ==
Ingeborg Møller was born in Kristiania (now Oslo), Norway. Her parents were Thorvald Fredrik Møller (1821-1879) and Nathalie Munch (1836-1904). Her father died one year after she was born. When Ingeborg was about five years old, her mother had a serious mental disorder and others took care of her. Part of her childhood was spent in Fredrikstad. During the 1890s, she spent two years at Olaf Berg's school of education (Olaf Bergs lærerinneskole). From 1915 she was involved in public-high school teaching in Dovre Municipality and Sel Municipality, where her teaching associates included Olav Aukrust (1883–1929). In 1921 she was associated with a children's shelter at Lillehammer.

She made her literary début with the play Fru Karen, staged at Centralteatret in 1904. She wrote several novels during the 1920s. In 1948 she published a biography of scientist and philosopher Henrik Steffens. She was awarded the Gyldendal's Endowment (Gyldendalprisen) in 1948.

== Personal life ==
She was married in 1904 to Daniel Kildal Lindholm (1875-1919) with whom she had three sons.
