= Just Super =

- Release poster
- Directed by: Rasmus A. Sivertsen
- Screenplay by: Kamilla Krogsveen
- Produced by: Åshild Ramborg; Stian Tveiten
- Edited by: Morten Rørvig
- Music by: Stein Johan Grieg Halvorsen; Eyvind Andreas Skeie
- Production company: Qvisten Animation
- Distributed by: Nordisk Film
- Release dates: 10 September 2022 (TIFF Junior); 30 September 2022
- Running time: 76 minutes
- Country: Norway
- Language: Norwegian
- Budget: €3.4 million

Just Super (Norwegian: Helt super) is a 2022 Norwegian computer-animated superhero film directed by Rasmus A. Sivertsen and produced by Qvisten Animation. It follows Hedvig, an 11-year-old gamer who is tasked with taking over the role of a superhero, Super Lion, from her father.

The film was released in Norwegian cinemas on 30 September 2022. It was selected to screen at the 73rd Berlin International Film Festival, but the first screening at the festival on 20 February 2023 was cancelled due to concerns of blackface, to the objection of the filmmakers and the Norwegian Film Institute.

== Cast ==
- Hennika Eggum Huuse as Hedvig
- Todd Monrad Vistven as Thomas
- Johannes Kjærnes as Adrian
- Tobias Santelmann as Super Lion
- Kari Simonsen as Grandma
- Henriette Marø as Teacher
- Line Verndal as Aunt
- Atle Antonsen as Uncle
- Desta Marie Beeder as News Reporter
- Charlotte Frogner as Mom

== Release ==
Just Super had its world premiere on 10 September 2022 at TIFF Junior, a children's film festival held in Tromsø, Norway, where it won the audience award. It was released in Norwegian cinemas on 30 September 2022 and had 110,000 admissions.

In November 2022, Viva Kids acquired rights for North American distribution.

=== Screenings at the Berlinale ===
The film was due for its international premiere on 20 February 2023 in the Generation Kplus section of the 73rd Berlin International Film Festival (Berlinale). The premiere was cancelled minutes before it was due, in light of concerns raised by the Anti-Racism Taskforce for European Film (ARTEF) about "the film's depictions of Blackface and animalisation of Black people". All four subsequent screenings at the festival took place as scheduled, with a disclaimer about the concerns posted. Sivertsen initially said he found the accusation of racism "incomprehensible" and the festival's decision to pull the premiere "shocking". He said, "When a film is invited to a festival, it goes without saying that it will be shown. If we cannot trust the festival to stand by its choices, one has to consider participation in Berlin in the future. The festival risks becoming irrelevant if it doesn't decide for itself which films we will see."

In a statement released on 24 February 2023, ARTEF said, after receiving the concerns from "colleagues" who had seen the film, it reached out to the Norwegian Film Institute (NFI) and Sivertsen on 18 February and to the festival on 19 February. It said, "In this film, the white heroes turn into lions that, unlike lions, have dark brown hands and partially dark brown faces and bodies which, as our colleagues pointed out, are depictions rooted in colonial thinking where Black people historically have been dehumanised and compared to animals", and while it "is not a watchdog" but "exist[s] inside the industry and merely identif[ies] problems and the systems that support them", it "wanted to avoid further harm to BIPOC audiences" and that the organisation and its members "received abhorrent emails and offensive remarks" during this process. Sivertsen explained that the mask and gloves were part of a costume meant to conceal the hero's identity and that the lion was chosen because it was featured in the logo of the Norwegian Automobile Federation, the film's main collaboration partner, and in the coat of arms of Norway, and because it is "a well-known symbol of courage and strength". The festival said "the film's representatives disregarded these concerns completely" and the premiere was pulled in agreement with the production company.

On 23 February 2023, the NFI asked its name be removed from ARTEF's website, with which ARTEF complied. On 24 February, the NFI, Qvisten Animation, and sales agent TrustNordisk issued a statement saying they "strongly object to the concerns in the letter from ARTEF". On 9 March, the NFI sent ARTEF a letter, shared simultaneously with the Berlinale and 24 European film industry bodies and four days later with the public, that outlined its initial support of ARTEF and the chain of events that led to the cancellation of the premiere and questioned on what mandate ARTEF took its actions, expressing concerns about "the implications this incident might have for the artistic freedom of filmmakers, and the editorial freedom and independence of international film festivals" and inviting "the organizations behind ARTEF, and the European film community, to dialogue to avoid future similar situations". It said after "numerous meetings" the Berlinale asked the producer and the NFI to consider withdrawing the film from the festival, which they declined, so they "reluctantly" agreed with the cancellation of the premiere. The letter continued, "We are also concerned that one of the effects of the events at this year's Berlinale, can be that programmers become hesitant to program potentially controversial films in fear of being targeted by activist interest groups. ARTEF, judged by the actions at this year's Berlinale, comes across as an activist group and a watchdog, despite claiming otherwise." On 11 March, Matthijs Wouter Knol, director of the European Film Academy (EFA), resigned from his positions at ARTEF as one of its three directors and as a steering member. He said he hoped the resignation would "clarify confusion" and eliminate "perceived conflict of interest". The same day, the EFA issued a letter welcoming the NFI's invitation to dialogue.

On 17 April 2023, Schwarze Filmschaffende, a network of Black film artists in German-speaking Europe, issued a public statement condemning the Berlinale's selection of Measures of Men, Seneca – On the Creation of Earthquakes, and Just Super, which it said promote "anti-Black racist images, tropes, stereotypes and discriminatory narrative forms". The collective said they agreed with ARTEF's statement and the festival's "bungling and inadequate" handling "led an already biased press to question the racist nature of the images, whilst revelling in belittling and insulting invaluable anti-racist organizations like ARTEF", and argued that the festival may have violated laws by failing to protect children and employees. In response, producer Stian Tveiten said, "We support the work of addressing institutional racism in the European film industry, but we strongly object to the allegations of racism in Helt Super."

== Accolades ==
Just Super won the audience award at the 2022 TIFF Junior festival. In March 2023, it received the Silver Nugget award for best family film.
