= Bikechess =

- Directed by: Assel Aushakimova
- Written by: Assel Aushakimova
- Produced by: Antoine Simkine, Almagul Thleukhanova, Kifrik Martin
- Starring: Saltanat Nauruz; Assel Abdimavlenova; Shyngys Beibituly; Duisenbek Sydykbekov
- Cinematography: Aidar Ospanov
- Edited by: Alanté Kavaïté
- Production companies: Les Films d’Antoine (France), Alma Pictures (Kazakhstan), Maipo Film (Norway)
- Release date: June 9, 2024 (Tribeca Festival)
- Running time: 100 minutes
- Country: Kazakhstan
- Language: Russian

Bikechess is a 2024 Kazakhstani drama film written and directed by Assel Aushakimova. The French-Kazakh-Norwegian co-production had its world premiere at the Tribeca Festival on 9 June 2024, where the film won Best International Narrative Feature.

With dark humour, the film dissects the levels of absurdity that the state will embrace and the constraints journalists face when striving to maintain ethical standards in the face of institutional pressures.

== Plot ==
The film's title refers to a new sport invented in Kazakhstan that consists of playing chess while pedalling a fitness bike, a subject that Dina covers as the government's latest innovation for the Kazakh populace. She works as a journalist for the Kazakh national television station and the stories she is asked to report on are increasingly absurd. Dina also looks after her young sister, a lesbian activist, who regularly finds herself in trouble with the authorities and her love life is limited to a few secret meetings with her married cameraman. Dina continues her professional duties, motivated by the promise of a coveted government position.

== Cast ==
- Saltanat Nauruz as Dina
- Assel Abdimavlenova as the Sister
- Shyngys Beibituly as the Cameraman
- Duisenbek Sydykbekov as the Driver

== Reception ==
=== Critical response ===
Cineuropa: "Bikechess is a dry, minimalist, and deadpan tragicomedy, structured episodically. Each segment might seem poised to launch into a comedic sketch, yet it is the prolonged exposition, driven by slow-burning observation, that transforms the entire sequence of meaningless events and campaigns into a punchline—revealing them as mere government propaganda purportedly aimed at serving the public. Aushakimova merges this portrayal with a critique of a life under a repressive regime, run not by the competent but by the vain, and thus paints a broader social critique that transcends Kazakhstan."

In Review Online: "The director borrows and translates quite a bit from the modern European social-drama school developed by filmmakers like the Dardenne brothers into the Kazakh context. The dialectic creates something familiar to both worlds, but new in itself."

Variety: "Aushakimova and cinematographer Aidar Ospanov take an unobtrusive, almost documentarian approach to each scene, which works to capture reaction shots that comment on various ongoing government rigmaroles. However, its more personal narratives, involving Dina and her immediate circle, often end up approached as superficially as the fluff pieces she’s forced to cover, with no real recourse."

The jury of Tribeca Festival said: “Pointing out through comedic eyes the absurdity to which the state can go to hide deeper issues, the jury truly appreciates the director’s fresh look at the ethics of journalism.”

=== Accolades ===
2023 : Works in Progress award - Karlovy Vary International Film Festival

2024 : Best International Narrative Feature - Tribeca Festival.
