= Kurt Turns Evil =

2008 animated film

- Norwegian theatrical release poster
- Norwegian: Kurt blir grusom
- Directed by: Rasmus A. Sivertsen
- Screenplay by: Per Schreiner; Karsten Fullu
- Based on: Kurt blir grusom (1995) by Erlend Loe
- Produced by: Cornelia Boysen; Ove Heiborg
- Edited by: Thor Sivertsen; Rasmus A. Sivertsen
- Music by: Stein Johan Grieg Halvorsen; Ketil Skei; Eivind Andreas Skeie
- Production companies: Nordisk Film; Qvisten Animation
- Release date: 31 October 2008
- Running time: 71 minutes
- Countries: Norway; Denmark
- Language: Norwegian
- Box office: $902,697

Kurt Turns Evil (Norwegian: Kurt blir grusom) is a 2008 animated children's film directed by Rasmus A. Sivertsen—in his directorial debut as sole director (Note: Rasmus co-directed Captain Sabertooth (2003).)—from a screenplay by Per Schreiner and Karsten Fullu, based on the 1995 book of the same name by Erlend Loe. A co-production between the Danish Nordisk Film and Norwegian Qvisten Animation, Kurt Turns Evil was produced by Cornelia Boysen and Ove Heiborg. It was released in Norway on 31 October 2008 and grossed $902,697.

== Plot ==
A man named Kurt lives a normal suburban life with his ambitious architect wife, Anne-Lise, his older son, Bruse-Kurt, his obese teenage daughter, Helena and his younger and most loyal son, Bud. At his job, Kurt is a skilled forklift driver who always wins the annual forklift race and is popular among his other co-workers. Back home, Kurt serves pancakes. But when Kurt hears his window breaking. He sees that Dr. Petter, a rich doctor has moved next door. Things only go from bad to worse as Kurt's family prefers Dr. Petter over him and his wife works for him causing Kurt to lose motivation at work. So, Kurt uses a shovel to dig a hole in order to create a pool for his pool party. Unfortunately, Dr. Petter's pool party is more successful. So, Kurt decides that he wants to be somebody.

At work, Kurt sees a sailor falling into the water, so Kurt saved him from drowning. The sailor said that he saved his life and that he will give Kurt his most prized possession. Kurt picked Bud from kindergarten and went to a restaurant to help a patient with Bud solving the problem. As a reward, the restaurant owner gives him and Bud an insanely luxurious dinner. Kurt calls the manager and says that he quits his job. At a hospital, Kurt and Bud go to the super mega chief head doctor for a job. Firstly, they didn't get the job because they didn't have the diplomas. But when Bud helps a patient get a toy train out his stomach, they get the job. On their first day, they get two patients. As the second one leaves, the super mega chief head doctor returns and tells them that he needs help with a surgery. At home, Kurt cooks dinner for his family and tells everyone that he is a doctor. Anne-Lise gets angry at Kurt for being a doctor stating that it's Illegal to pass oneself off as a doctor and that he could go to jail because it takes 7 years to become a doctor. Tomorrow, the super mega chief head doctor finds out that the two aren't actually doctors causing a scandal. A hospital chase happens involving a policeman and the super mega chief head doctor chasing Kurt and Bud.

Tomorrow, Anne-Lise gets angry at Kurt again due to being involved in a scandal at the hospital. Kurt gets a fine and the family can no longer afford food. The sailor goes to Kurt and gives his most prized possession, a diamond. Kurt sells the diamond for 50,000,000 kroner. The policeman gives Kurt a fine that grows when he insults the policeman. At home, Kurt doesn't share his money with his family and allows bud to share his money with him eventually resulting in Kurt's money causingbproblems for his family and Dr. Petter. Kurt then decides to run for prime minister after realising that his money isn't very much in the big picture. Unfortunately, he loses the election causing him to turn evil and do massive damage to the city.

Kurt gets arrested for failing to destroy the Storting building. He is forced to sleep on the floor by his cellmates. At court, Kurt gets accused for being evil and he pays a fine of 40,000,000 kroner. Kurt builds a tower out of wood and stays at the top, his boss offers him a promotion, but he refuses. Kurt then realises that the kindergarten got destroyed and he uses his forklift to save the students and the teacher.

At the end, Dr. Petter moves out, Kurt's family rebuilds the kindergarten, and Kurt returns to his job as a forklift driver.

== Voice cast ==
The voice cast, per the Norwegian Film Institute:

- Atle Antonsen as Kurt
- Aksel Hennie as Bud
- Fredrik Steen as the doctor
- Anders Bye as Bruse Kurt
- Pernille Sørensen as Tykke Helena and the Prime Minister:
- Paul-Ottar Haga as the Policeman
- Jon Øigarden as Dr. Petter
- Kristin Skogheim as Anne-Lise

== Release ==
Kurt Turns Evil was released in Norwegian cinemas on 31 October 2008. It grossed $227,997 in its opening weekend, for a total box office gross of $902,697.
