= Ploddy the Police Car on the Case =

2013 Norwegian animated film

- Norwegian theatrical release poster
- Pelle Politibil på sporet
- Directed by: Rasmus A. Sivertsen; Rune Spaans
- Screenplay by: Arthur Johansen
- Production company: Neofilm AS
- Release date: 3 March 2013
- Running time: 82 minutes
- Country: Norway
- Language: Norwegian
- Budget: NOK 16,295,000
- Box office: $2,220,689

Ploddy the Police Car on the Case (Note: Also translated as Ploddy the Police Car on the Trail) (Norwegian: Pelle Politibil på sporet; also released as Bold Eagles) is a 2013 Norwegian animated adventure film directed by Rasmus A. Sivertsen and Rune Spaans from a screenplay by Arthur Johansen. A sequel to Ploddy the Police Car Makes a Splash (2009), it is the third film to be based on the Norwegian children's character Pelle Politibil (Ploddy the Police Car).

== Premise ==
Ploddy the Police Car is assigned to guard the largest attraction in the brand new Eagle Park in Bodø, an endangered eagle and her egg. However, two thieves steal the eagle and Ploddy ends up hatching the egg under his hood, and it is up to him to save the eagle all while taking care of her newly-hatched baby.

== Release ==
The film was released on 3 March 2013 in Norway, and grossed $2,102,960 from 158,029 admissions,for a worldwide total of $2,220,689.
