= A Doll's Dream =

1950 short film directed by Ivo Caprino

- Directed by: Ivo Caprino
- Written by: Ivo Caprino
- Release date: January 1950
- Running time: 18 minutes
- Country: Norway
- Language: Norwegian

A Doll's Dream (Norwegian: Musikk på loftet/En dukkedrøm) is a 1950 Norwegian animation short film directed by Ivo Caprino. It was the first 35mm colour film made in Norway.

== Plot ==
The film is about Lars and Lotte, two children whose father owns a music shop. The father wants them to learn to play, but instead of playing the instruments they destroy them. One night Sandman comes and makes them dream that they go up in the attic where their father's old instruments are. The instruments come alive, and play melodies. After this, Lars and Lotte no longer want to destroy the instruments, and start playing them instead.
