= The Pinchcliffe Grand Prix =

- Norwegian: Flåklypa Grand Prix
- Directed by: Ivo Caprino
- Written by: Kjell Aukrust; Ivo Caprino; Kjell Syversen; Remo Caprino
- Produced by: Ivo Caprino
- Starring: Frank Robert; Kari Simonsen; Toralv Maurstad; Rolf Just Nilsen; Harald Heide-Steen Jr.; Helge Reiss; Wenche Foss; Per Theodor Haugen; Henki Kolstad; Leif Juster
- Narrated by: Leif Juster
- Cinematography: Charles Patey
- Edited by: Ivo Caprino
- Music by: Bent Fabricius-Bjerre
- Production company: Caprino Filmcenter a/s
- Release date: 28 August 1975
- Running time: 88 minutes
- Country: Norway
- Language: Norwegian
- Box office: $6,439,069

The Pinchcliffe Grand Prix (Norwegian: Flåklypa Grand Prix) is a 1975 Norwegian stop-motion-animated sports film directed by Ivo Caprino. It is based on characters from a series of books by Norwegian cartoonist and author Kjell Aukrust.

It is the most widely seen Norwegian film of all time, having sold some 5 million tickets since its release to a population which currently numbers just over 5 million. The film sold 28 million movie tickets in the former Soviet Union.

== Plot ==
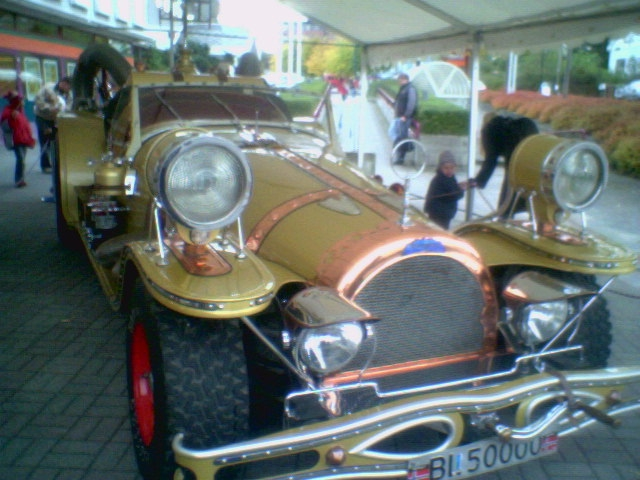
Full-scale replica of Il Tempo Gigante

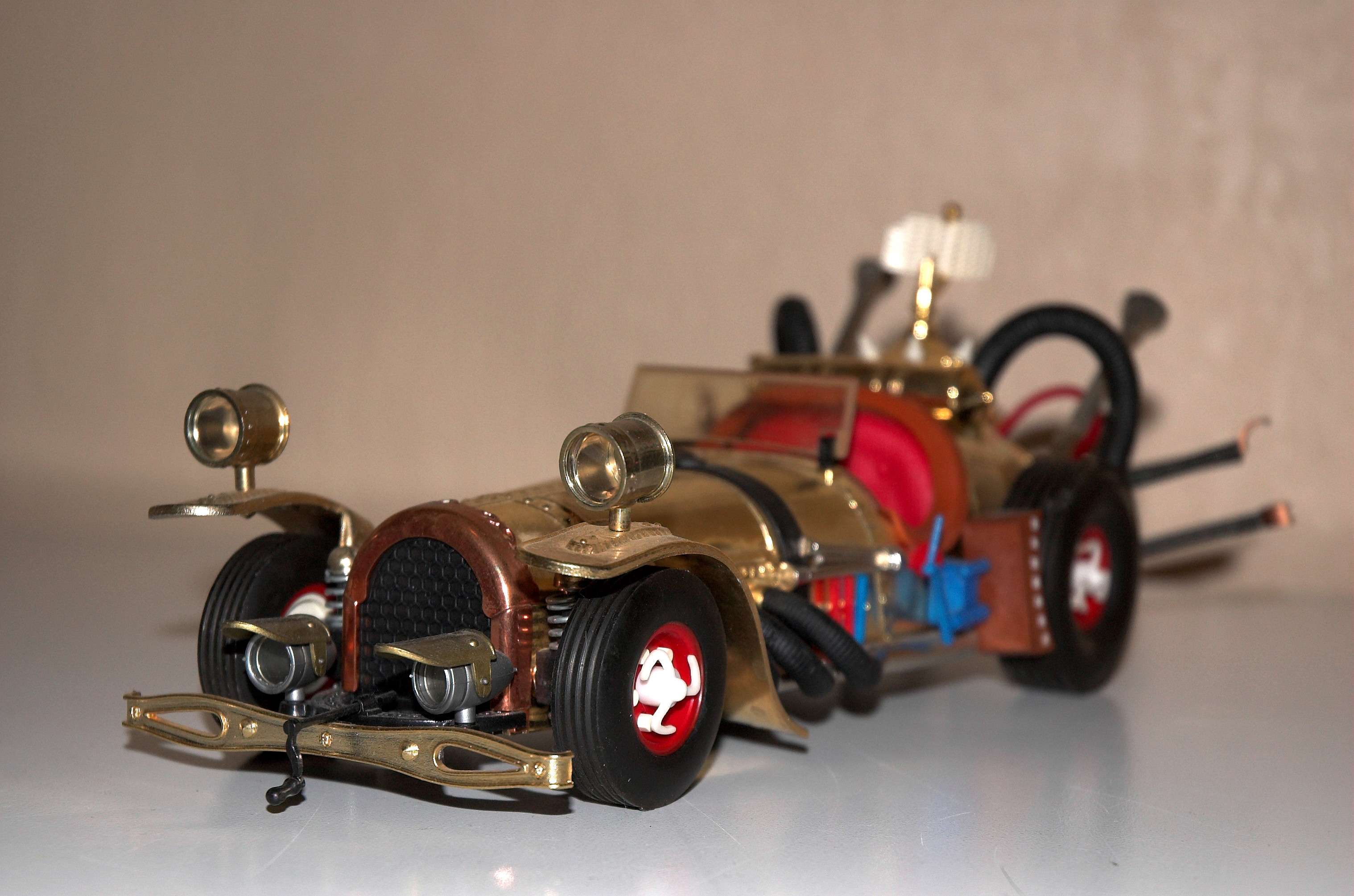
Model of Il Tempo Gigante

In the village of Flåklypa, (En. Pinchcliffe), the inventor Reodor Felgen (En. Theodore Rimspoke) lives with his animal friends Ludvig (En. Lambert) (a nervous, pessimistic and melancholic hedgehog) and Solan Gundersen (En. Sonny Duckworth) (a cheerful and optimistic magpie). Reodor works as a bicycle repairman; one day, the trio discovers that one of Reodor's former assistants, Rudolf Blodstrupmoen (En. Rudolph Gore-Slimey), has stolen his design for a race car engine and has become a world champion Formula Seven driver. Solan secures funding from Arab oil sheik Ben Redic Fy Fazan (En. Abdul Ben Bonanza), who happens to be vacationing in Flåklypa, and to enter the race, the trio builds a gigantic racing car: Il Tempo Gigante. Reodor ends up winning despite Blodstrupmoen's attempts at sabotage.

== History ==
In 1969, Ivo Caprino and Kjell Aukrust started work on a 25-to-30-minute-long pilot for a TV series entitled Flåklypa Radio Norway (also called Flåklypa TV og Radio in some sources) based on Aukrust's books and commissioned for the Norwegian Broadcasting Corporation. Puppets were designed by Ingeborg Isdahl Riser, with the star vehicle Il Tempo Gigante being built by Bjarne Sandemose (who used entirely house-found material in its construction). Despite major publicity, the NRK were unsatisfied and ceased production; another factor was difficulty adapting the original material. With the exception of 7-8 minutes worth of footage (including some that were repurposed for Flåklypa Grand Prix), no material from it has ever been seen by the public. A year later, Caprino and Aukrust announced that it would be adapted into a feature-length film.

The film is heavily inspired by Lom Municipality, where Aukrust had roots. The Flåklypa-mountain is a stylized version of a real mountain, where the valley underneath is named Flåklypa. Other names, including Reodor and Blostrupmoen, were taken from the village of Alvdal. The film was made in 3 years by a small team of set builders and camera operators; Caprino directed and animated.

== Release and reception ==
Flåklypa Grand Prix was originally released in Norway on 28th August 1975. Following its immense success, NRK1, later TV 2 Direkte, began broadcasting the film every year on Christmas Eve and Christmas Day respectively, a tradition which continues into the present day. To promote it, a life-size replica of Il Tempo Gigante was created. In 2013, the film was released on Blu-ray and finally available in high definition, the restoration process having begun in 2005 for DVD and further enhanced for a theatrical 2010 rerelease.

The first English-language release occurred in 1981, distributed by G.G. Communications with a dub recorded in Montreal, Canada. It debuted on VHS and Betamax on 26 January 1981, distributed by Video Gems and later gave it a theatrical release in July 1981. The film was later re-released on VHS by Starmaker Entertainment in 1989. In the United Kingdom another dub premiered on BBC One in 1983; it is this version that is available on Norwegian home video releases.

== Subsequent films based on Aukrust's Flåklypa universe ==
- Gurin with the Foxtail (1998)
- Solan og Ludvig - Jul i Flåklypa (2013)
- Solan og Ludvig: Herfra til Flåklypa (2015)
- Månelyst i Flåklypa (2018)
- Flåklypa – fra Paris til pyramidene (2025)

== Other works inspired ==
In 2000, the PC game based on the film was released. An Anniversary Edition followed in 2001, and a Gold Edition in 2002, each adding new features and minigames. The game broke Norwegian video game sales records upon release in 2000. It remains the best-selling video game in Norway.

The game is a hybrid point-and-click adventure and racing game consisting of various minigames. Players explore Flåklypa to interact with characters and scavenge for car parts, which are then used to build and upgrade the Il Tempo Gigante for racing.

Development was originally led by Tyr Neilsen of Ingames Interactive before being completed under the supervision of Remo Caprino. Mario Caprino served as lead programmer, while Joe Dever and Terry Greer served as lead designers.

In 2010, an adaptation for Nintendo DS was released. A modern remake was subsequently released in 2021, followed by a Gold Edition in 2025, restoring several minigames from the original release, for Windows, Nintendo Switch, and PlayStation.

The film inspired a young Christian von Koenigsegg to create the Koenigsegg CC, the first of the Koenigsegg line of supercars.

Norwegian hip-hop duo Multicyde based their 1999 single "Not for the Dough" on a sample from the film's soundtrack and featured excerpts from the film in the song's music video.

== See also ==
- List of animated feature films
- List of stop-motion films
