= Ivo Caprino =

Norwegian film director (1920–2001)

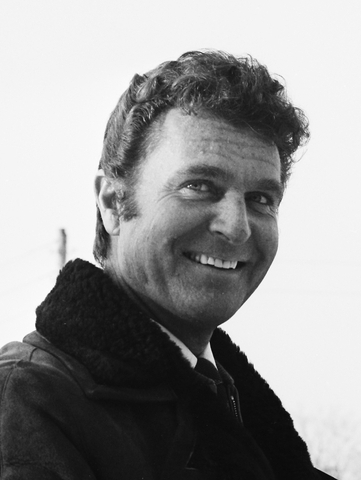
- Ivo Caprino in 1970
- Born: 17 February 1920; Oslo, Norway
- Died: 8 February 2001 (aged 80); Oslo, Norway
- Occupations: Film director, screenwriter
- Spouse: Liv Bredal (divorced)

Ivo Caprino (17 February 1920 – 8 February 2001) was a Norwegian film director and writer, best known for his puppet films. His most noted film, Flåklypa Grand Prix (Pinchcliffe Grand Prix), was made in 1975.

== Early life ==
Caprino was born 17 February 1920 in Oslo, the son of Italian furniture designer Mario Caprino and the artist, Ingeborg "Ingse" Gude, who was a granddaughter of the painter Hans Gude.

== Early career ==
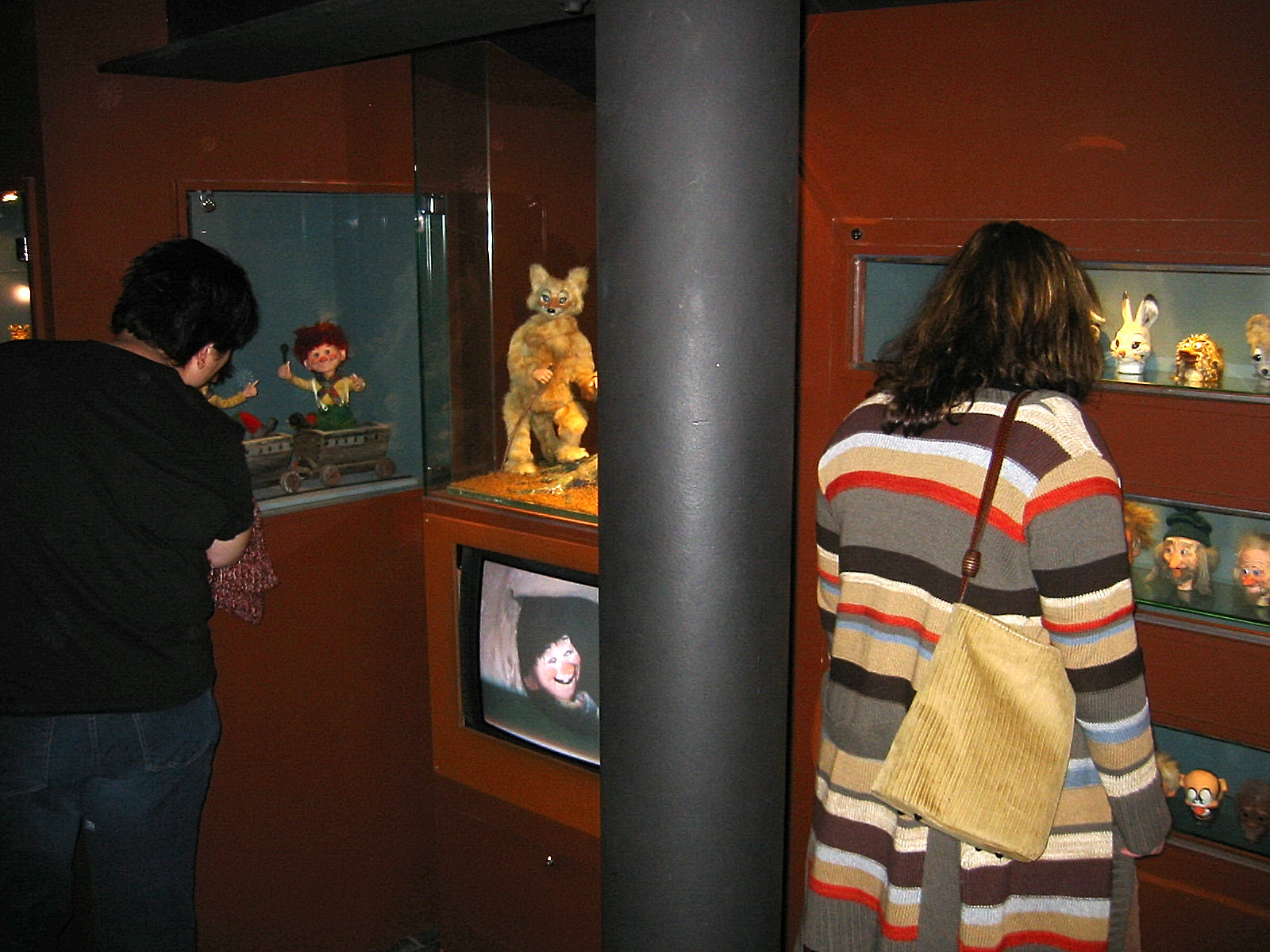
Original dolls used in Ivo Caprino's films which are exhibited in the Norwegian Film Museum in Oslo.

In the mid-1940s, Caprino helped his mother design puppets for a puppet theatre, which inspired him to try making a film using his mother's designs. Ivo used the surplus puppets as inspiration for his first animated film, Tim and Tøffe (1948), the result of their collaboration. The eight minute film, however, was not released until 1949. Several other films followed, including two 15-minute shorts that are still shown regularly in Norway, Veslefrikk med Fela (Little Freddy and his Fiddle), based on a Norwegian folk tale; and Karius og Baktus, a story by Thorbjørn Egner of two little trolls—representing caries and bacterium—living in a boy's teeth. Gude made the puppets for these films as well.

=== Work with Ingse Caprino ===
Following the success of Tim og Tøffe, Gude was involved in all of her son's films until 1963. Gude made some puppets for a production by Frithjof Tidemand-Johannessen. Caprino had set up a film studio in the manor house, and Gude started working full-time on new puppets, which often had luscious proportions. The film, Veslefrikk med Fela, was awarded the best children's film at the 13th Venice International Film Festival in 1952. The commissioned production, Den standhaftige tinnsoldat (The Steadfast Tin Soldier), won several international awards.

Gude filled the role of cinematographer on the last film collaboration with her son. The puppet's voice role being played by Liv Strømsted. Gude died 9 December 1963 at Snarøya. The production of puppets was afterwards taken over by her granddaughter Ivonne Caprino.

== Innovations ==
In 1949, when making Tim og Tøffe, Caprino patented a method for controlling the puppets' movements in real time. It was a mechanical keyboard connected to the puppets, allowing him to move even minor parts like the eyes. Caprino's films received good reviews, and he quickly became a celebrity in Norway. When he switched to traditional stop motion film-making, Caprino tried to maintain the impression that he was still using some kind of "magic" technology to make the puppets move, even though all his later films were made with traditional stop motion techniques. Another innovative method used by the team was the use of condoms for the creation of the puppets' facial skin.

In addition to the short films, Caprino produced dozens of advertising films with puppets. In 1959, he directed a live action feature film, Ugler i Mosen, which also contained stop motion sequences. He then made a feature film about Peter Christen Asbjørnsen, who had travelled around Norway in the 19th century collecting traditional folk tales. The plan was to use live action for the sequences showing Asbjørnsen, and then to realise the folk tales using stop motion. Unfortunately, Caprino was unable to secure funding for the project, so he ended up making the planned folk tale sequences as separate 16-minute puppet films, book-ended by live action sequences showing Asbjørnsen.

== The Pinchcliffe Grand Prix ==
In 1970, Caprino and his small team of collaborators, started work on a 25-minute TV special, which eventually became The Pinchcliffe Grand Prix. Based on a series of books by Norwegian cartoonist and author, Kjell Aukrust, it featured a group of eccentric characters all living in the small village of Pinchcliffe. The TV special was a collection of sketches based on Aukrust's books, with no real story line. After 1.5 years of work, it was decided that it didn't really work as a whole, so production on the TV special was stopped (except for some very short clips, no material from it has ever been seen by the public), and Caprino and Aukrust instead wrote a screenplay for a feature film using the characters and environments that had already been built.

The result was The Pinchcliffe Grand Prix, which stars Theodore Rimspoke (No. Reodor Felgen) and his two assistants, Sonny Duckworth (No. Solan Gundersen), a cheerful and optimistic bird, and Lambert (No. Ludvig), a nervous, pessimistic and melancholic hedgehog. Theodore works as a bicycle repairman, though he spends most of his time inventing weird Rube Goldberg-like contraptions. One day, the trio discover that one of Theodore's former assistants, Rudolph Gore-Slimey (Norwegian: Rudolf Blodstrupmoen), has stolen his design for a race car engine, and has become a world champion Formula One driver. Sonny secures funding from an Arab oil sheik who happens to be vacationing in Pinchcliffe, and the trio then build a gigantic racing car, Il Tempo Gigante—a fabulous construction with two engines, radar, and its own blood bank. Theodore then enters a race, and ends up winning, beating Gore-Slimey despite his attempts at sabotage.

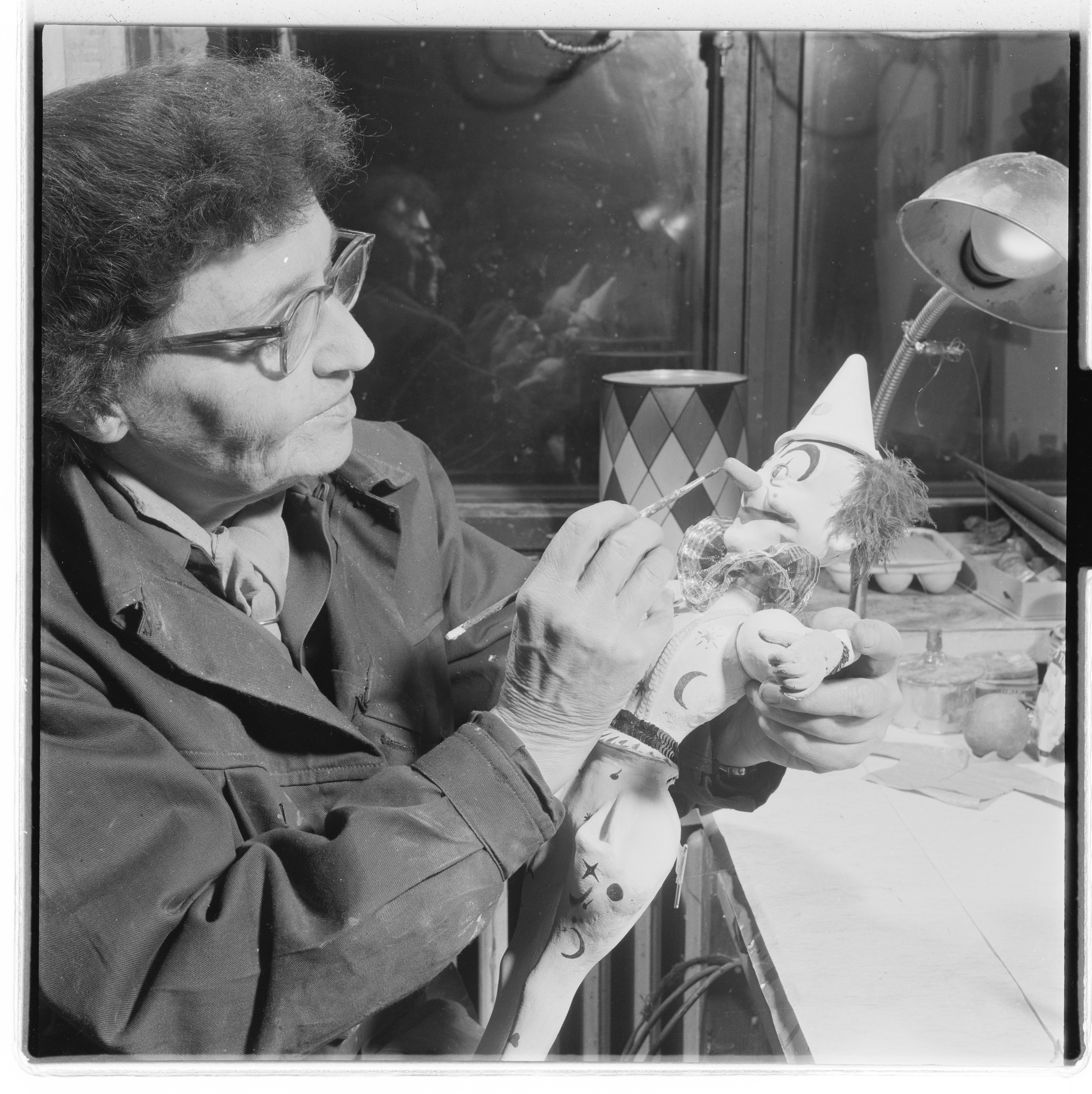
Ingeborg Gude paints a clown (1954)

The film was made in 3.5 years by a team of five people. Caprino directed and animated. Bjarne Sandemose (Caprino's principal collaborator throughout his career) built the sets and the cars, and was in charge of the technical side. Ingeborg Riiser modeled the puppets and Gerd Alfsen made the costumes and props. When it came out in 1975, The movie was a large success in Norway, selling one million tickets in its first year of release. It remains the biggest box office hit of all time in Norway. Caprino Studios claims it has sold 5.5 million tickets to date.

There is a rollercoaster replica of Il Tempo Gigante at Hunderfossen Familiepark.

== Later career ==
Except for some TV work in the late 1970s, Caprino made no more puppet films, focusing instead on creating attractions for the Hunderfossen theme park outside Lillehammer based on his folk tale movies, and making tourist films using a custom built multi camera setup of his own design that shoots 280 degrees panorama movies.

== Death and afterwards ==
Caprino was born and died in Oslo, but lived all of his life at Snarøya, Bærum. He died in 2001 after having lived several years with cancer. Since Caprino's death, his son Remo has had moderate success developing a computer game based on Flåklypa Grand Prix.

== Filmography ==
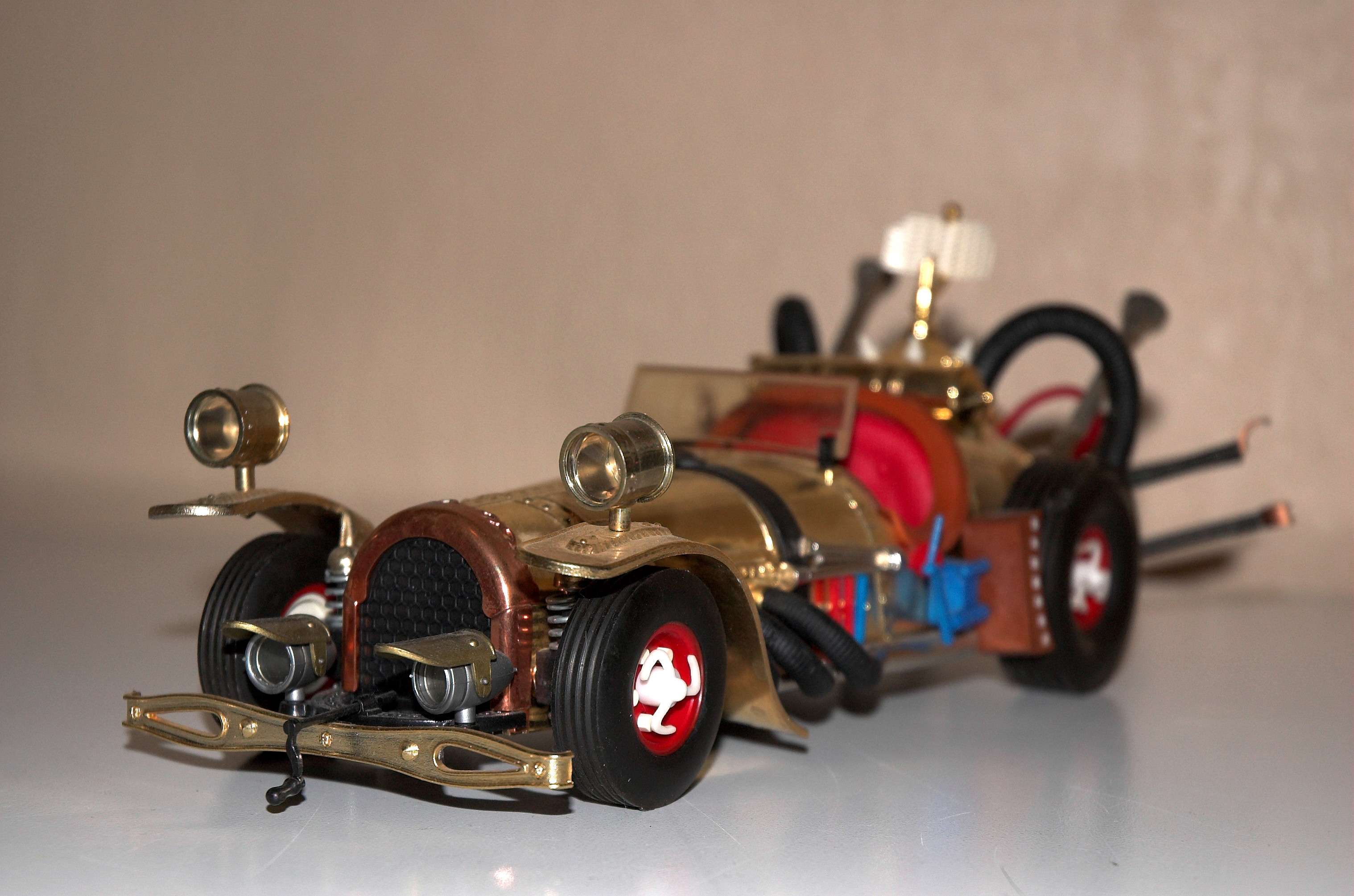
Flåklypa Grand Prix, a Norwegian stop motion-animated feature film from 1975, was Ivo Caprino's most successful film. The image is of a toy model of "Il Tempo Gigante", the main race car featured in the movie.

- 1975 – Flåklypa Grand Prix
- 1967 – Gutten som kappåt med trollet
- 1966 – Sjuende far i huset
- 1963 – Papirdragen
- 1962 – Reveenka
- 1961 – Askeladden og de gode hjelperne
- 1959 – Ugler i mosen
- 1958 – Et hundeliv med meg
- 1955 – Den standhaftige tinnsoldat
- 1955 – Klatremus i knipe
- 1954 – Karius og Baktus
- 1952 – Veslefrikk med fela
- 1950 – Musikk på loftet/En dukkedrøm
- 1949 – Tim og Tøffe

== See also ==
- Ivo Caprinos Supervideograf
