= Ploddy the Police Car Makes a Splash =

2009 Norwegian animated film

- Norwegian theatrical release poster
- Pelle Politibil Går I Vannet
- Directed by: Rasmus A. Sivertsen
- Screenplay by: Arthur Johansen
- Production companies: Neofilm AS; Qvisten Animation
- Distributed by: Nordisk Film Distribution
- Release date: 25 December 2009
- Running time: 74 minutes
- Country: Norway
- Language: Norwegian
- Budget: NOK 15,789,400
- Box office: $1,883,189

Ploddy the Police Car Makes a Splash (Norwegian: Pelle Politibil går i vannet; also released as Police Patrol) is a 2009 Norwegian animated adventure comedy film directed by Rasmus A. Sivertsen from a screenplay by Arthur Johansen. It is the second film to be based on the children's character Pelle Politibil (Ploddy the Police Car), and the first to be animated. It was followed by a sequel in 2013 titled Ploddy the Police Car on the Case.

== Premise ==
Two brothers determined to steal the water supply of a village wreak havoc to the local environment, and it is up to the local police enforcement's Ploddy the Police Car to try and stop them.

== Release ==
The film had its world premiere in Oslo on Christmas Day, 2009, and was released in Norwegian cinemas on 8 January 2010, grossing $1,524,396 from 120,816 admissions for a worldwide total of $1,883,189.
