= Maipo Film =

Norwegian film and television production company

Maipo Film is a Norwegian film production company founded in 2000. It created the Oscar-nominated film "Elling" (2001), starring Per Christian Ellefsen (Elling), Sven Nordin (Kjell Bjarne), Marit Pia Jacobsen (Reidun), Jørgen Langhelle (Frank Åsli), and Per Christiansen (Alfons Jørgensen), based on the novel "Brødre i Blodet" by Ingvar Ambjørnsen. Maipo followed the Elling success with a sequel (Mors Elling) and produced other feature films. Maipo won Best International Narrative Feature at Tribeca Festival 2024 with Bikechess.

== Filmography ==
- 2026: Low Expectations (Lave forventninger)
- 2024: Bikechess, Best International Narrative Feature at Tribeca Festival 2024. (Excellence award in Sweden)
- 2019: Heirs of the Night
- 2016: Solan and Ludvig 2 (Solan og Ludvig - Herfra til Flåklypa)
- 2015: Doctor Proctor: Bubble in the Bath Tube (Doktor Proktors tidsbadekar)
- 2015: Homesick (Hjemlengsel)
- 2015: Staying Alive (Staying Alive)
- TBA/indefnite hold: The Devil's Apprentice (Djævelens lærling) or The Great Devil War (Den Store Djævlekrig)
- 2014: Miss Julie (Frøken Julie)
- 2014: One Night in Oslo (Natt til 17.)
- 2014: Doctor Proctor's Fart Powder (Doktor Proktors prompepulver)
- 2013: The Christmas of Solan and Ludvig (Solan og Ludvig - Jul i Flåklypa)
- 2013: Nobody Owns Me (Meg eier ingen)
- 2013: Hocus Pocus Alfie Atkins (Hokus pokus, Albert Åberg)
- 2013: Alfie Atkins Albert Åberg (TV-series)
- 2012: Truth Consequence (Dom over død mann) (co-production)
- 2012: An Enemy To Die for (En fiende å dø for) (co-production)
- 2011: People in the Sun (Mennesker i solen)
- 2010: Happy, Happy (Sykt Lykkelig)
- 2010: Shameless (Maskeblomstfamilien)
- 2010: The Woman Who Dreamed of a Man (Kvinnen der drømte om en mann) (co-production)
- 2010: East End Angels (Asfaltenglene)
- 2008: The Last Joint Venture (Den Siste Revejakta)
- 2008: Oh My God! (Oh My God!)
- 2007: Svein and the Rat and the UFO-mystery (Svein og Rotta og UFO-mysteriet)
- 2006: The Art of Negative Thinking (Kunsten å tenke negativt)
- 2006: Maria's Men (Marias Menn)
- 2005: Chinaman (Kinamand) (co-production)
- 2006: Svein and the Rotta (Svein og Rotta)
- 2005: Love Me Tomorrow (Elsk meg i morgen)
- 2005: All For One (RAN)
- 2004: My Jealous Barber (Min Misunnelige Frisør)
- 2004: Just Bea (Bare Bea)
- 2003: Mother's Elling ( Mors Elling)
- 2003: Jonny Vang (Jonny Vang)
- 2002/03: The Fire Brigade (Brigaden)
- 2002: To the End of the World (Verdens Ende)
- 2002: Cash (Spenn)
- 2002: Salt & Pepper (Salt & Pepper)
- 2002: For Sure (Sikkert opplegg)
- 2001: Elling (Elling)
