= Odd Aukrust =

Norwegian economist (1915–2008)

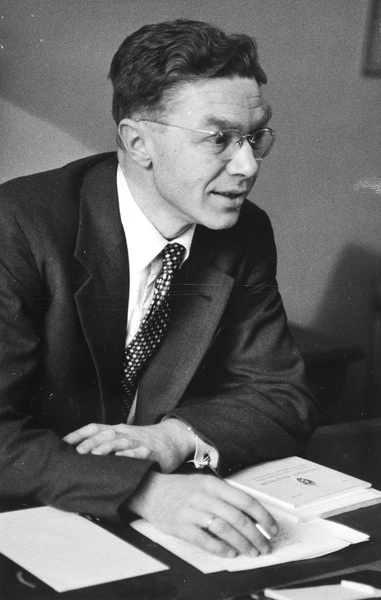
Odd Aukrust, c. 1968

Odd Aukrust (15 December 1915 – 22 June 2008) was a Norwegian economist.

He was born in Tynset Municipality as a son of Lars Olsen Aukrust (1886–1965) and Louise Walmsnæss (1887–1973). He was a nephew of Olav Aukrust, brother of Kjell Aukrust, and first cousin of Tor Aukrust. He was married to Bjørg Marie Hessbak since 1945.

He studied political economy at the University of Oslo under Ragnar Frisch, and graduated in 1941. He was influenced by Keynesian economics. He published the notable analysis Hva krigen kostet Norge with Petter Jakob Bjerve in 1945, and took the dr.oecon. degree in 1956. From 1953 to 1984 he was director of research at the Statistics Norway bureau.

He died in Kolbotn at the age of 92.
