= Ivo Caprinos Supervideograf =

Ivo Caprinos Supervideograf (lit. "Ivo Caprino's Super Videographer") is a type of cinema technology used several places in Norway.

It was developed by animator and filmmaker Ivo Caprino. It was introduced as part of a 90 million kr entertainment centre at Nordkapp in 1988. The screen spanned 225 degrees and utilized five film projectors. The films are created with five cameras which are mounted together. It can be mounted under a helicopter, on a sled and used under water. By 2004, more than 30 films had been made.

In 1995 a "Super Videographer" was added to the amusement park Hunderfossen Familiepark, which also features other themes from Ivo Caprino's animation universe. A "Super Videographer" cinema was also included in the polar centre Polaria in Tromsø, Hardangervidda Natursenter in Eidfjord the Norwegian Glacier Museum in Fjærland and other locations. The cinema at Nordkapp was replaced with a new high-definition panorama cinema in 2009.
