= Olav Aukrust =

Norwegian poet and teacher

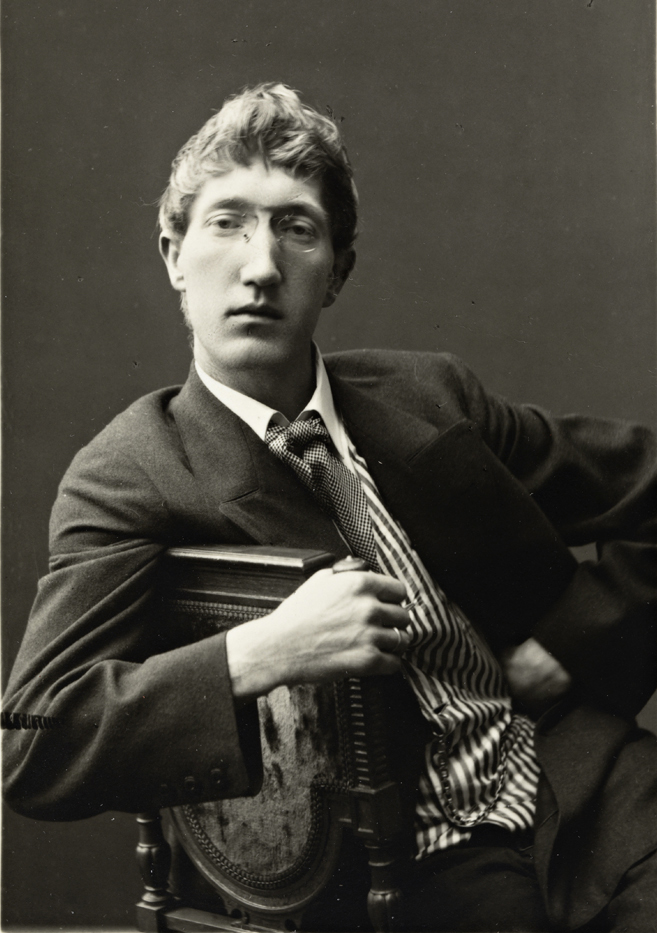
- Born: 21 January 1883; Lom, Norway
- Died: 3 November 1929 (aged 46); Lom, Norway
- Occupations: Poet, educator
- Years active: 1916–1929
- Spouse: Gudrun Blekastad
- Relatives: Lars Olsen Aukrust (brother); Odd Aukrust (nephew); Kjell Aukrust (nephew)

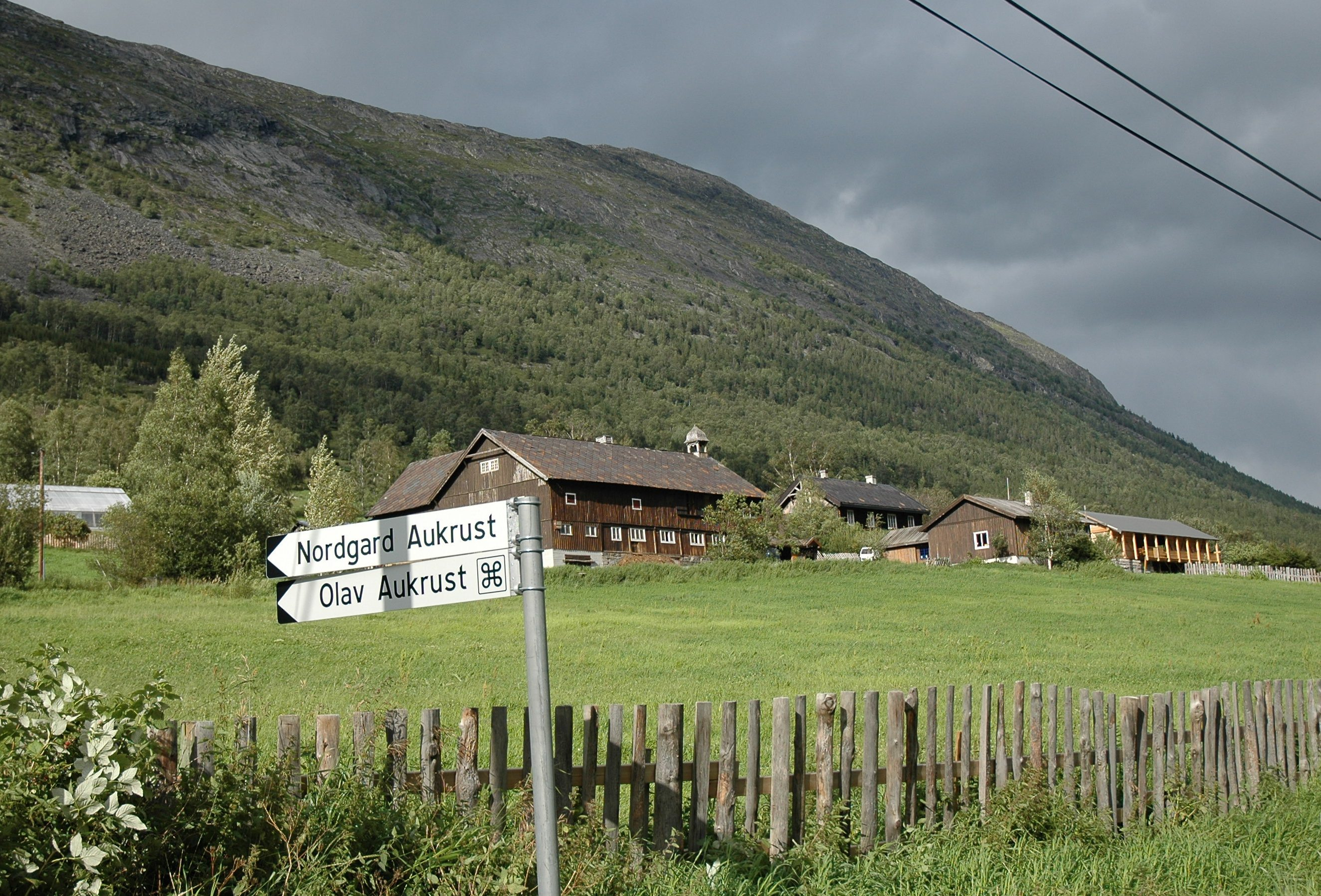
Nordgard Aukrust farm in Lom Municipality, where Olav Aukrust was born and lived most of his life, is open to tourists in the summer.

Olav Aukrust (21 January 1883 – 3 November 1929) was a Norwegian poet and teacher. He popularized the use of Nynorsk as a literary language and is most commonly associated with his poem Himmelvarden (1916).

== Biography ==
Aukrust was born in Lom Municipality in Christians county, Norway. He was raised in the traditional region of Gudbrandsdal. His parents Olav Olavsson Aukrust (1851–1931) and Mari Pålsdatter Andvord (1864–1936) were farmers on the Nordgard Aukrust farm in the valley of Bøverdalen. His brother Lars Olsen Aukrust (1886–1965) was a teacher and local official. His nephews Odd Aukrust (1915 –2008) was an economist and Kjell Aukrust (1920–2002) was an author, poet and artist.

Aukrust was a student of the folk college at Romundgard in Sel Municipality operated by priest and educator Christopher Bruun (1839–1920). From 1915 to 1917, he worked as a teacher at the folk high school at Dovre Municipality where future novelist Ingeborg Møller (1878–1964) was also a teacher. He later taught at Gausdal Municipality.

In 1911, he married Gudrun Blekastad (1887–1984), daughter of Haugean businessman Ivar Blekastad (1850–1936). She was the sister of artist Hallvard Blekastad (1883–1966) and sister-in-law of literary historian Milada Blekastad (1917–2003).

He was strongly influenced by priest and author Ivar Mortensson-Egnund (1857–1934) who advocate of the use of Nynorsk. Aukrust wrote poems with a renewed national romantic style and used a characteristically similar form. His use of rural dialect contributed to the growth of Nynorsk as a literary language.

Olav Aukrust joined the Anthroposophical Society in December 1921 after he and his wife, Gudrun Aukrust, traveled through Goetheanum on their way home from Italy. He suffered from tuberculosis, which came to characterize his last year and led to an early death at age 46.

== Legacy ==
Nordgard Aukrust is now open to the public. The farm has a large garden and offers the sales of agricultural products during the tourist season.

Sculptor Dyre Vaa designed the Olav Aukrust statue (bronze, 1952) which was installed at Lom in 1952.

== Related reading ==
- Downs, Brian W. (1966) Modern Norwegian Literature 1860–1918 (Cambridge University Press) ISBN 9780521048545
