= Lars Olsen Aukrust =

Norwegian politician

Lars Olsen Aukrust (2 October 1886 – 10 January 1965) was a Norwegian farmer and politician for the Agrarian Party.

He was born at Aukrust in Lom Municipality as a son of farmers Olav Olsen Aukrust (1851–1931) and Marit Paalsdatter Andvord (1864–1936). He took education at Storhove Agricultural School in 1907 and the Norwegian College of Agriculture in 1911. He was a teacher at Østfold Folk High School from 1911 to 1913, county agronomist in Nordre Østerdalen from 1914 to 1917 and manager of Storteigen Agricultural School in Alvdal from 1918 to 1945.

He was a consultant for the Royal Norwegian Society of Development from 1917 to 1918, later a board member from 1934 to 1945. He also chaired the Norwegian Agrarian Association branch in Alvdal, and was a national board member. When the Agrarian Party was created out of the Agrarian Association, Aukrust stood for parliamentary election in 1921. He was elected as a deputy representative to the Parliament of Norway, and again became deputy in 1927. He finally became a regular representative in 1933, and served through one term. During this term he was a member of the Standing Committee on the University and Vocational Schools.

Aukrust was a brother of the poet Olav Aukrust. Together with Louise Walmsnæss (1887–1973) he had the sons Odd and Kjell Aukrust, and he was also an uncle of Tor Aukrust. Lars Olsen Aukrust died in January 1965 and was buried in Alvdal.
