= Pelle Politibil =

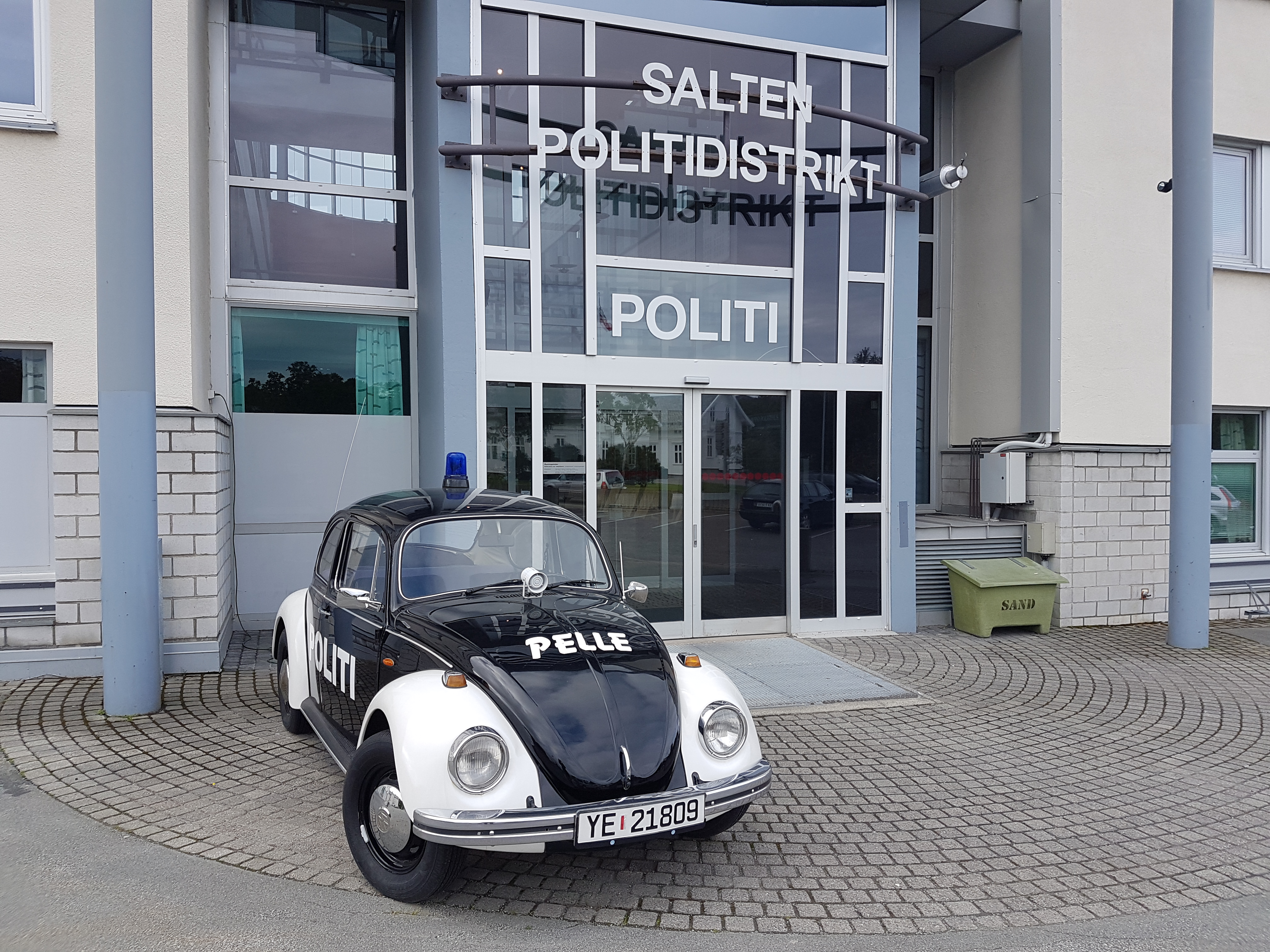
Pelle Politibil in front of Salten Police station in Bodø

Pelle Politibil (known as Ploddy the Police Car in some English-dubbed media) is a Norwegian children's character and police mascot appearing in various Norwegian media. The character is an anthropomorphic car with eyes as headlights, based on a black-and-white 1973 Volkswagen 1300.

Pelle was created by Norwegian police officer Åge Magnussen in the 1980s, and was originally the star of a titular NRK radio show beginning in 1986 that ran for three seasons. The character then starred in a titular live-action TV series that was aired by NRK between 1993 and 1997.

Pelle has appeared in three feature films, the live-action Pelle Politibil in 2002, and computer-animated Ploddy the Police Car Makes a Splash (Pelle Politibil Går I Vannet) in 2009 and Ploddy the Police Car on the Case (Pelle Politibil på sporet) in 2013.

The character has also been subjected in several books, commercials, toys, a mobile video game and on music albums.
