= Iben Sandemose =

Norwegian writer and illustrator

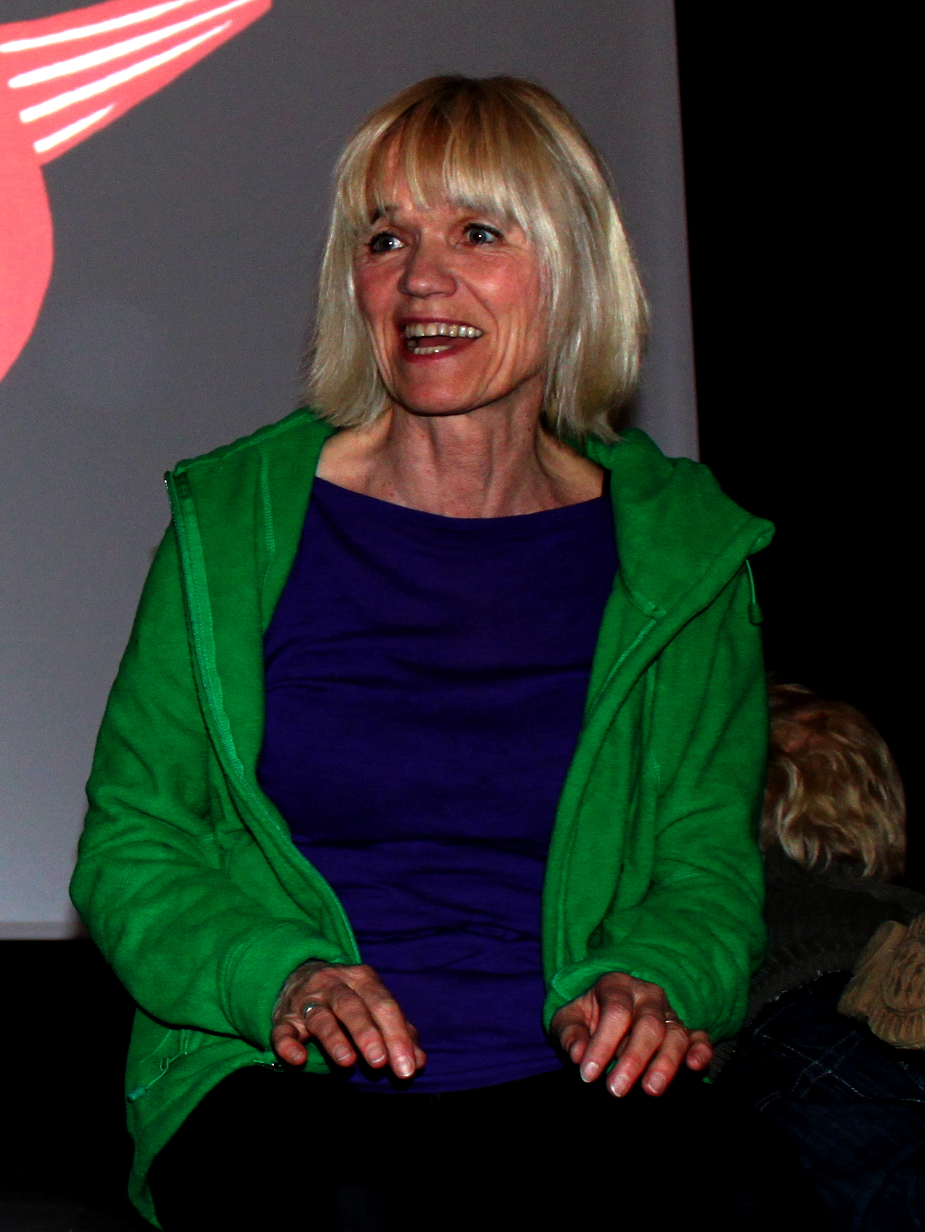
- Iben Sandemose in 2012. Credit: Grethe Tvede, Aust-Agder bibliotek og kulturformidling
- Born: 13 July 1950 (age 75); Oslo, Norway
- Occupations: Writer and visual artist
- Relatives: Aksel Sandemose (grandfather)
- Awards: Teskjekjerringprisen (2011)

Iben Sandemose (born 13 July 1950) is a Norwegian illustrator, children's writer, playwright and biographer. She was born in Oslo, and is the granddaughter of Aksel Sandemose. Among her children's books is Vingemus og kattejammer from 1987, and Ringeren & Notre Madame from 1994, which was adapted for theatre and staged at Centralteatret in 1994. She was awarded Teskjekjerringprisen in 2011. She is represented with her art works at Riksgalleriet and at the National Gallery of Norway.
