= Aksel Sandemose =

Danish-Norwegian writer (1899–1965)

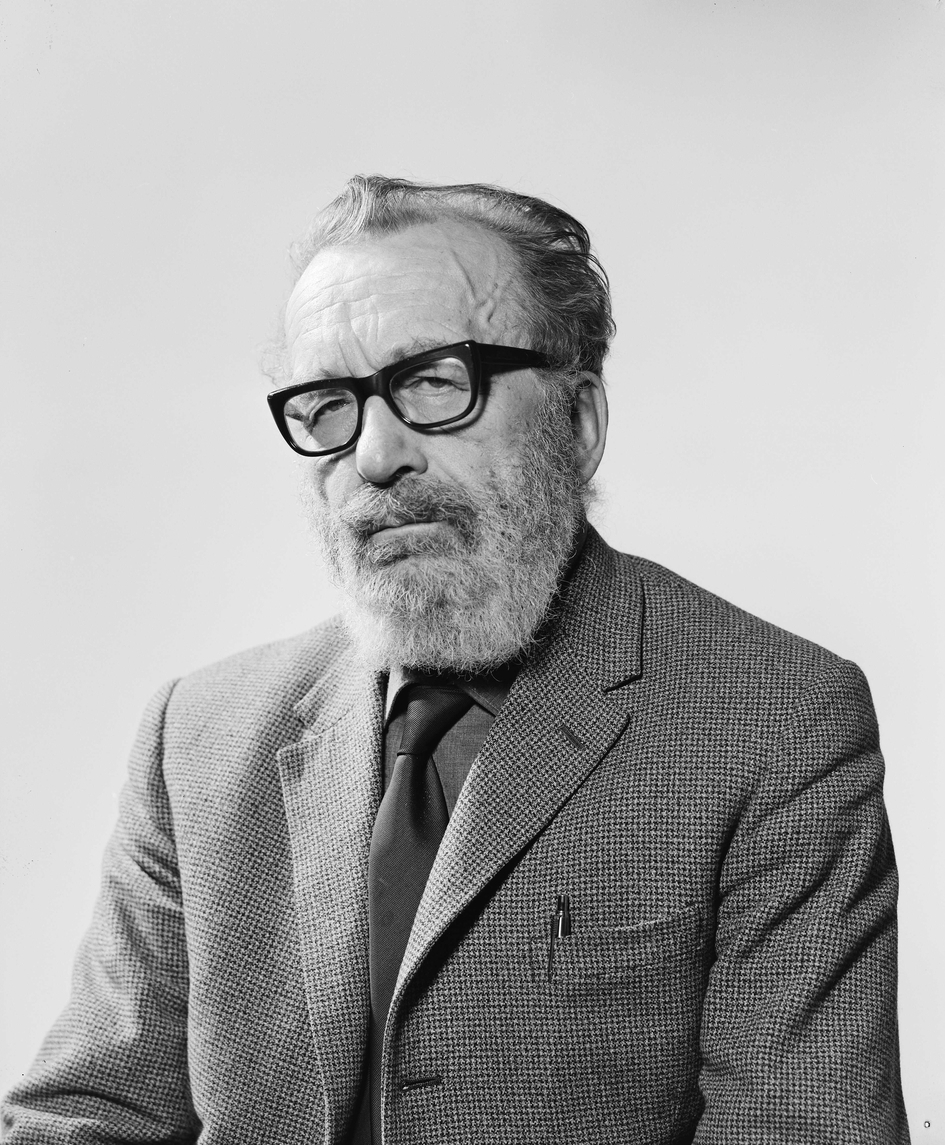
- Sandemose in 1963
- Born: Axel Nielsen; 19 March 1899; Nykøbing Mors, Denmark
- Died: 6 August 1965 (aged 66); Copenhagen, Denmark
- Occupation: Writer

Aksel Sandemose (originally Axel Nielsen; 19 March 1899 – 6 August 1965) was a Danish-Norwegian writer whose works frequently elucidate the theme that the repressions of society lead to violence.

== Biography ==
Axel Nielsen was born at Nykøbing Mors on the island of Mors in Denmark. His parents were Jørgen Nielsen (1859–1928) and Amalie Jacobsdatter (1861–1926). His father was a factory foreman. He was the second youngest of nine children. He attended Staby vinterlærerskole 1915–1916. His mother was originally from Sandermosen at Maridalen in Aker Municipality, Norway. He changed his surname to Sandemose in 1921.

Sandemose boarded a schooner for Norway at the age of seventeen. He was a sailor and lumberjack in Newfoundland. He worked as a teacher at Nykøbing in 1916 and at Glyngøre in Skive Municipality during 1917. In 1930, Sandemose moved to Norway, and lived in Nesodden Municipality south of Oslo. After the Nazi German occupation of Norway during World War II, he fled to Sweden in 1941 due to his peripheral association with the Norwegian resistance movement. After the liberation of Norway, he moved back and settled in Søndeled Municipality.

Sandemose published his first book in Denmark during 1923. His most notable work was En flyktning krysser sitt spor (1933). The novel was translated into English and published under the title A Fugitive Crosses His Tracks in 1936 by Alfred A. Knopf. In this satirical novel about Danish village life, Sandemose introduced the concept of the Law of Jante, a listing of ten cultural rules which describe a pattern of group behaviour towards individuals said to be common to Nordic countries. But the author himself considered in a foreword to a later edition the Law to be universal, and more common in Brooklyn than in his own hometown.

He was also an essayist and journalist. For a number of years he had a regular column in the weekly magazine Aktuell. Sandemose was awarded the Dobloug Prize during 1959 and was one of six finalists for the Nobel Prize in Literature in 1963.

== Personal life ==
Sandemose first married in 1921 Dagmar Ditlevsen (1896–1984); their marriage was dissolved in 1944. He married Eva Borgen (1906–1959) in 1944. After Eva's death he married Hanne Holbek in 1962. Sandemose fathered five children over his lifetime. He was the grandfather of illustrator and children's writer Iben Sandemose. Sandemose died in Copenhagen in 1965 and was buried at Vestre gravlund in Oslo.

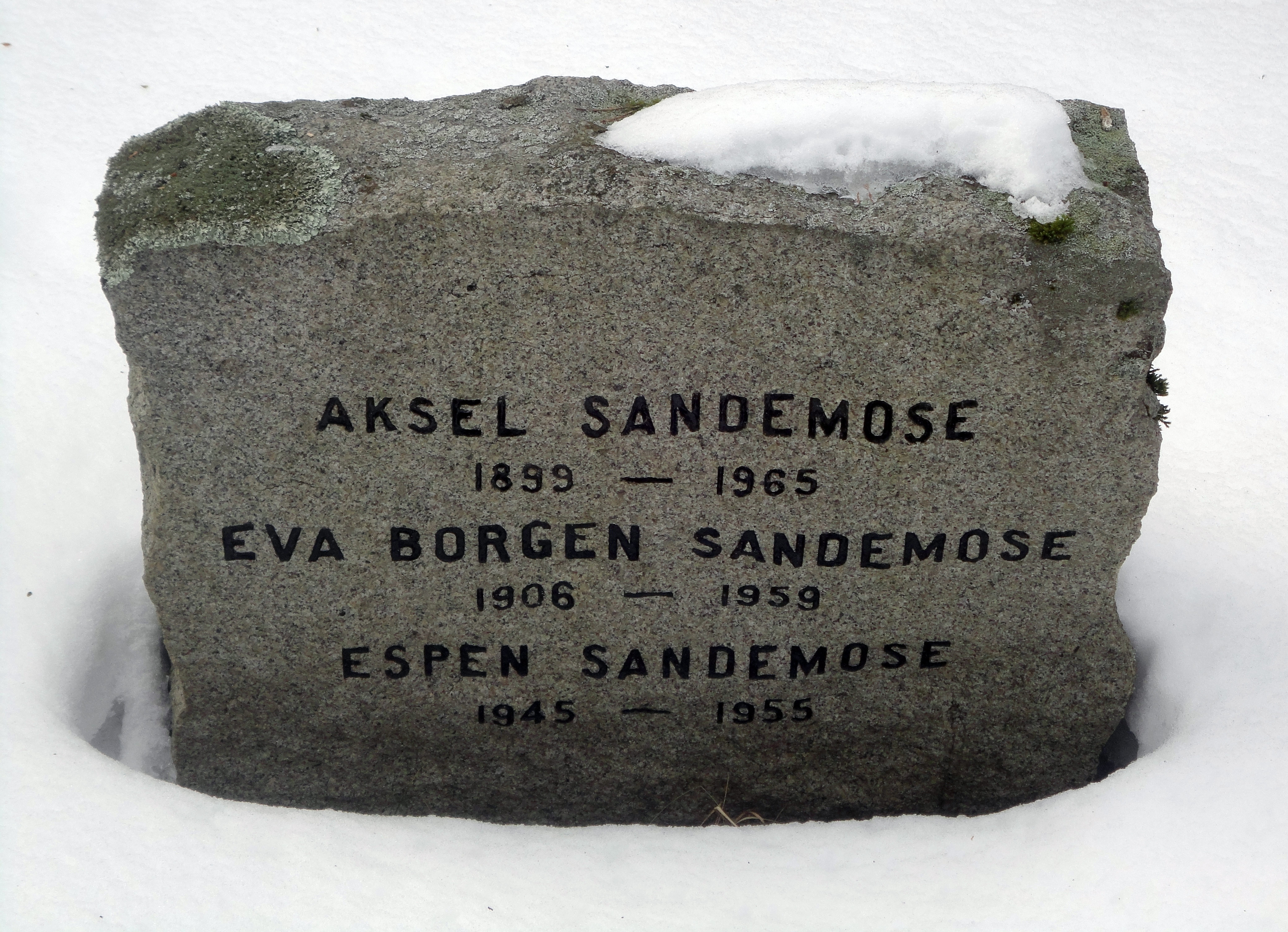
Sandemose family grave, Vestre gravlund, Oslo.

== Bibliography ==
- 1923 Fortællinger fra Labrador
- 1924 Ungdomssynd
- 1924 Mænd fra Atlanten
- 1924 Storme ved jævndøgn
- 1927 Klabavtermanden
- 1928 Ross Dane
- 1931 En sjømann går i land
- 1932 Klabautermannen
- 1933 En flyktning krysser sitt spor
- 1936 Vi pynter oss med horn
- 1939 September
- 1945 Tjærehandleren
- 1946 Det svundne er en drøm
- 1949 Alice Atkinson og hennes elskere
- 1950 En palmegrønn øy
- 1954 Rejsen til Kjørkelvik
- 1958 Varulven
- 1960 Murene rundt Jeriko
- 1961 Felicias bryllup
- 1963 Mytteriet på barken Zuidersee
