= Kjell Aukrust =

Norwegian writer and illustrator

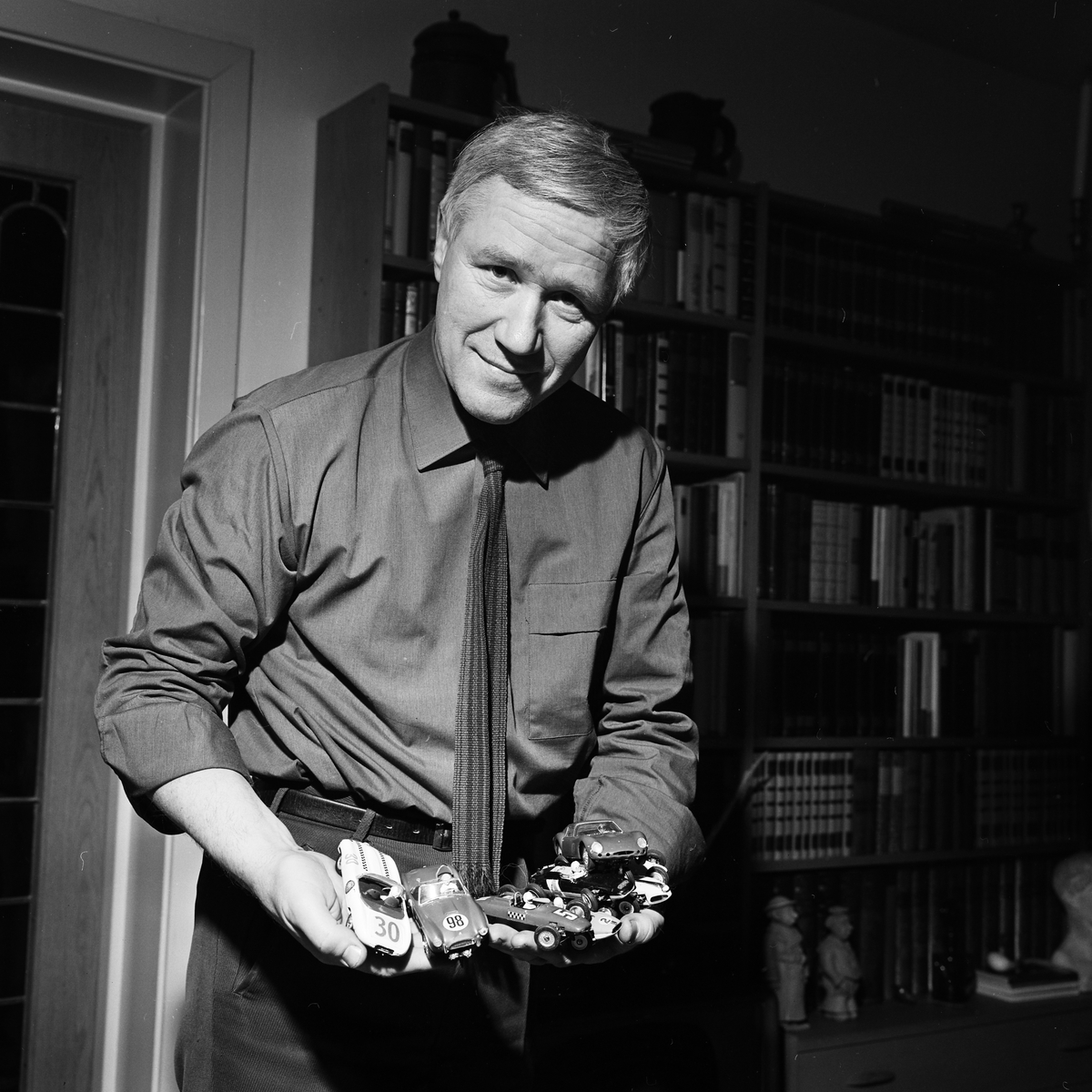
Kjell Aukrust (1965)

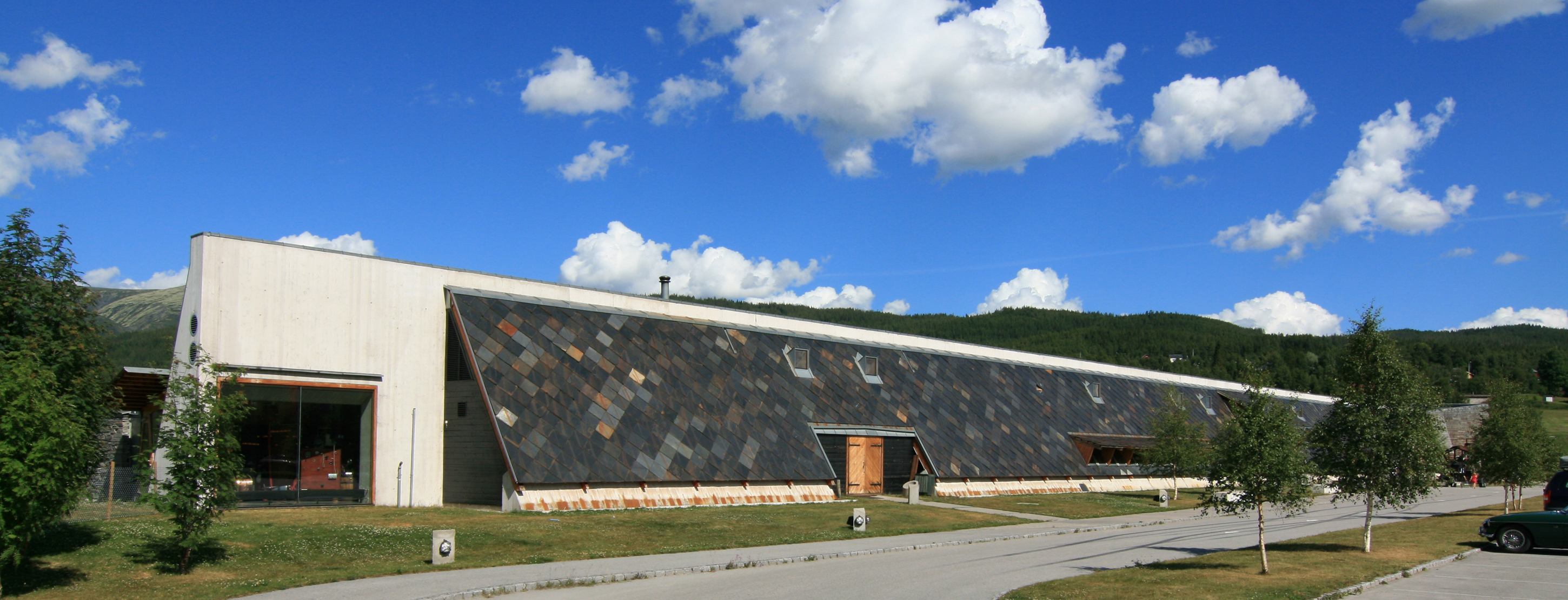
Aukrustsenteret (now Huset Aukrust)

Kjell Aukrust (19 March 1920 – 24 December 2002) was a Norwegian author, poet, artist and humorist. Aukrust is principally known for his Flåklypa stories and Flåklypa drawings.

== Personal life ==
Aukrust was born in Alvdal Municipality in Hedmark, Norway as a son of Lars Olsen Aukrust (1886–1965) and Louise Walmsnæss (1887–1973). His father was principal at Storsteigen Agricultural School in Alvdal. He was a nephew of poet Olav Aukrust, brother of Odd Aukrust, a noted economist who was responsible for research at Statistics Norway. He was married to Kari Holter in 1947. He trained at the Norwegian National Academy of Craft and Art Industry 1938–42. In 1939, one of his drawings was accepted at the Autumn Exhibition in Oslo. His memoirs of his childhood in Alvdal appeared in the series of three books: Simen, Bonden and Bror Min published in 1958, 1964 and 1960.

== Career ==
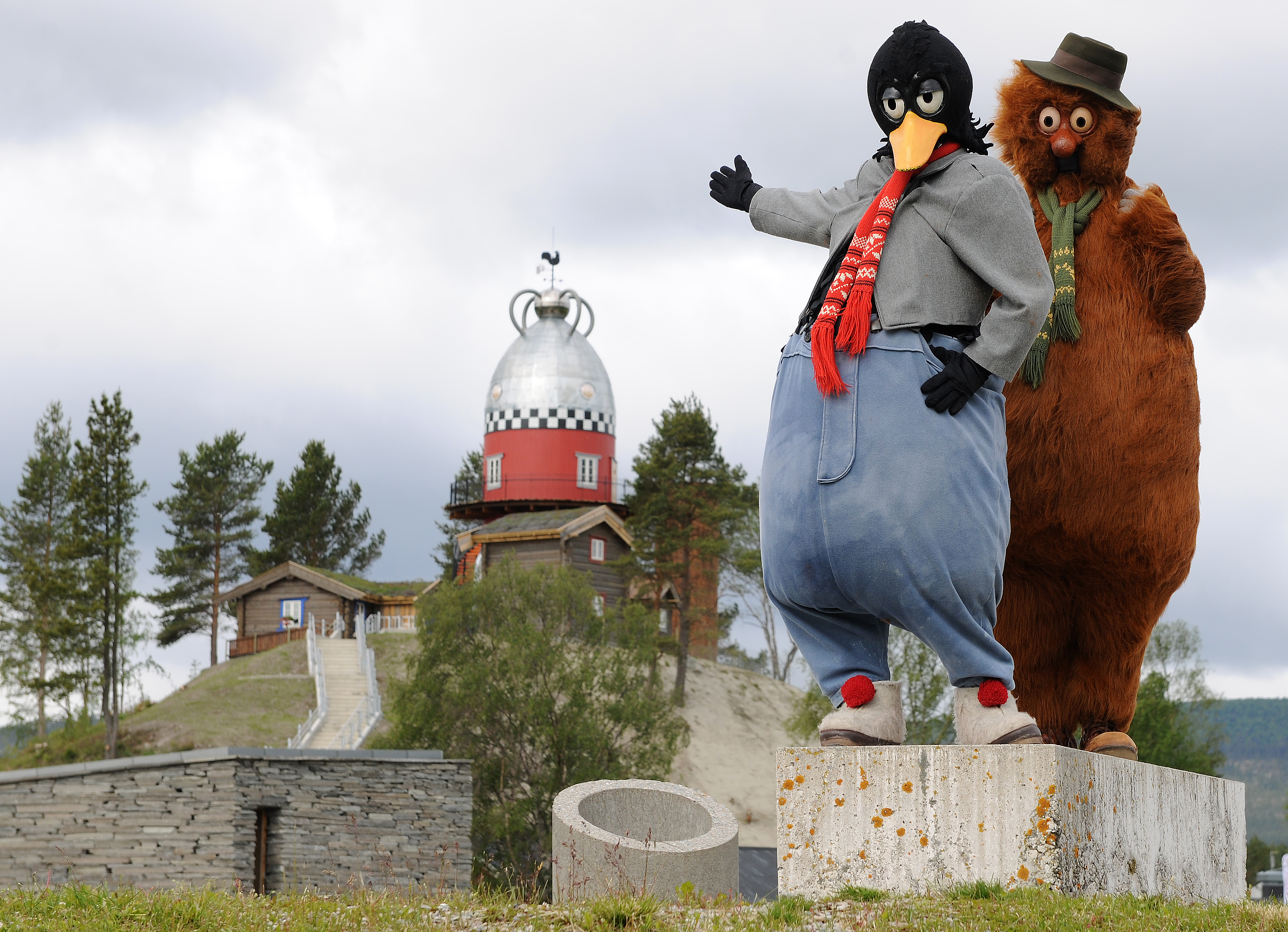
Solan Gundersen and Ludvig at Flåklypatoppen

He is most famous for his creation of the fictional Norwegian village of Flåklypa populated with a cast of idiosyncratic characters. He created the Flåklypa society while being an illustrator and columnist for the magazine Mannskapsavisa, with characters such as Reodor Felgen, Solan Gundersen, Ludvig and Emanuel Desperados. His column, which was modelled as a collection of satirical newspaper articles, was eventually renamed Flåklypa Tidende. This setting was the basis of the 1975 animated film "Flåklypa Grand Prix", directed by Ivo Caprino. The film was the first full-length animated feature in Norway, became an international success and has been translated into more than seventy languages. In Britain it is known as "Pinchcliffe Grand Prix". The protagonist Reodor Felgen (English version: Theodore Rimspoke) has become synonymous in Norway with Rube Goldberg type contraptions.

Some of the characters who populated the village of Pinchcliffe were also the basis for the first full-length hand drawn animated feature in Norway, "Solan, Ludvig og Gurin med reverompa". Released in 1998, this movie takes place in Oslo and Alvdal. In Britain it is known as Gurin with the Foxtail.

== Huset Aukrust ==
In 1996, Aukrustsenteret (now Huset Aukrust) was opened in Alvdal. The center was designed by architect Sverre Fehn. In addition to Aukrust's drawings, Huset Aukrust contains many of Kjell Aukrust's imaginative technical devices, such as a model of Il Tempo Gigante, the car featured in the film Flåklypa Grand Prix.
