= Hyde Park =

Hyde Park may refer to:

== Places ==
=== England ===
- Hyde Park, London, a Royal Park in Central London
  - Hyde Park (ward). electoral ward in Westminster
- Hyde Park, Leeds, an inner-city area of north-west Leeds
- Hyde Park, Sheffield, district of Sheffield
- Hyde Park, in Hyde, Greater Manchester

=== Australia ===
- Hyde Park, Perth, a park in Perth
- Hyde Park, Queensland, a suburb of Townsville
- Hyde Park, South Australia, a suburb of Adelaide
- Hyde Park, Sydney, park in New South Wales

=== United States ===
- Hyde Park, Los Angeles, California
- Hyde Park (Tampa), Florida
- Hyde Park, Boise, Idaho, a historic district in Boise's North End neighborhood
- Hyde Park, Chicago, Illinois, a neighborhood
- Hyde Park Township, Cook County, Illinois, annexed by Chicago in 1889
- Hyde Park, Boston, Massachusetts
- Hyde Park Township, Wabasha County, Minnesota
- Hyde Park, Kansas City, Missouri
- Hyde Park, St. Louis, Missouri
- Hyde Park, New Mexico
- Hyde Park, Cincinnati, Ohio
- Woodbourne-Hyde Park, Ohio
- Hyde Park, Pennsylvania, borough in Westmoreland County
- Hyde Park, Berks County, Pennsylvania
- Hyde Park (Hato Rey), a subbarrio of Hato Rey Sur, San Juan, Puerto Rico
- Hyde Park, Memphis, Tennessee
- Hyde Park (Austin, Texas)
- Hyde Park, Montrose, Houston, Texas
- Hyde Park, Utah
- Hyde Park, Georgia

==== New York ====
- Hyde Park, New York, town in Dutchess County, New York, hometown of Franklin D. Roosevelt
  - Hyde Park (CDP), New York, a hamlet and census-designated place (CDP) in the town of Hyde Park
- Hyde Park (hamlet), New York, a hamlet in Otsego County, New York
- New Hyde Park, New York, Long Island

==== Vermont ====
- Hyde Park (town), Vermont
  - Hyde Park (village), Vermont
  - North Hyde Park, Vermont

=== Other countries ===
- Hyde Park, Guyana, in the Demerara-Mahaica Region
- Hyde Park, Gauteng, South Africa
- Hyde Park, Belgrade, Serbia
- Hyde Park, London, Ontario, Canada

== Grounds ==
- Hyde Park, Glasgow, a former football ground in Glasgow, Scotland
- Dr. Hyde Park, a Gaelic Games ground in Roscommon, Ireland
- Hyde Park (cricket ground), a former important cricket venue in Sheffield
- Hyde Park (Niagara Falls, New York), a park in Niagara Falls, New York
- Hyde Park (Burkeville, Virginia), a historic home and farm

== Schools ==
- Hyde Park Career Academy, Chicago, Illinois, United States
- Hyde Park High School (South Africa)
- Hyde Park Junior School, United Kingdom
- Hyde Park Baptist High School, Austin, Texas, United States
- Hyde Park Middle School, Las Vegas, Nevada, United States

== Other uses ==
- Hyde Park (play), by James Shirley
- Hyde Park (1934 film), a British comedy film
- Hyde Park (2017 film), an independent Western film
- Hyde Park Movement Party, Thailand
- Hyde Park Diggers, London hippie movement and commune co-founded by Sid Rawle
- Hyde Park Theatre, an arts center in Austin, Texas
- Hyde Park (Osnabrück), a music venue
- Hyde Park, one of the Deux mélodies de Guillaume Apollinaire by Francis Poulenc

== See also ==
- Heide Park, a theme park in Soltau, Lower Saxony, Germany
- Gunfight at Hide Park
- Hyde Park on Hudson, a 2012 British film starring Bill Murray
- Hyde Park station (disambiguation)
