= Nicholas Barton =

Nicholas Barton may refer to:

- Nick Barton (born 1955), British evolutionary biologist
- Nicholas Barton (filmmaker) (born 1983), American filmmaker
