= Duel =

Formalised type of single combat

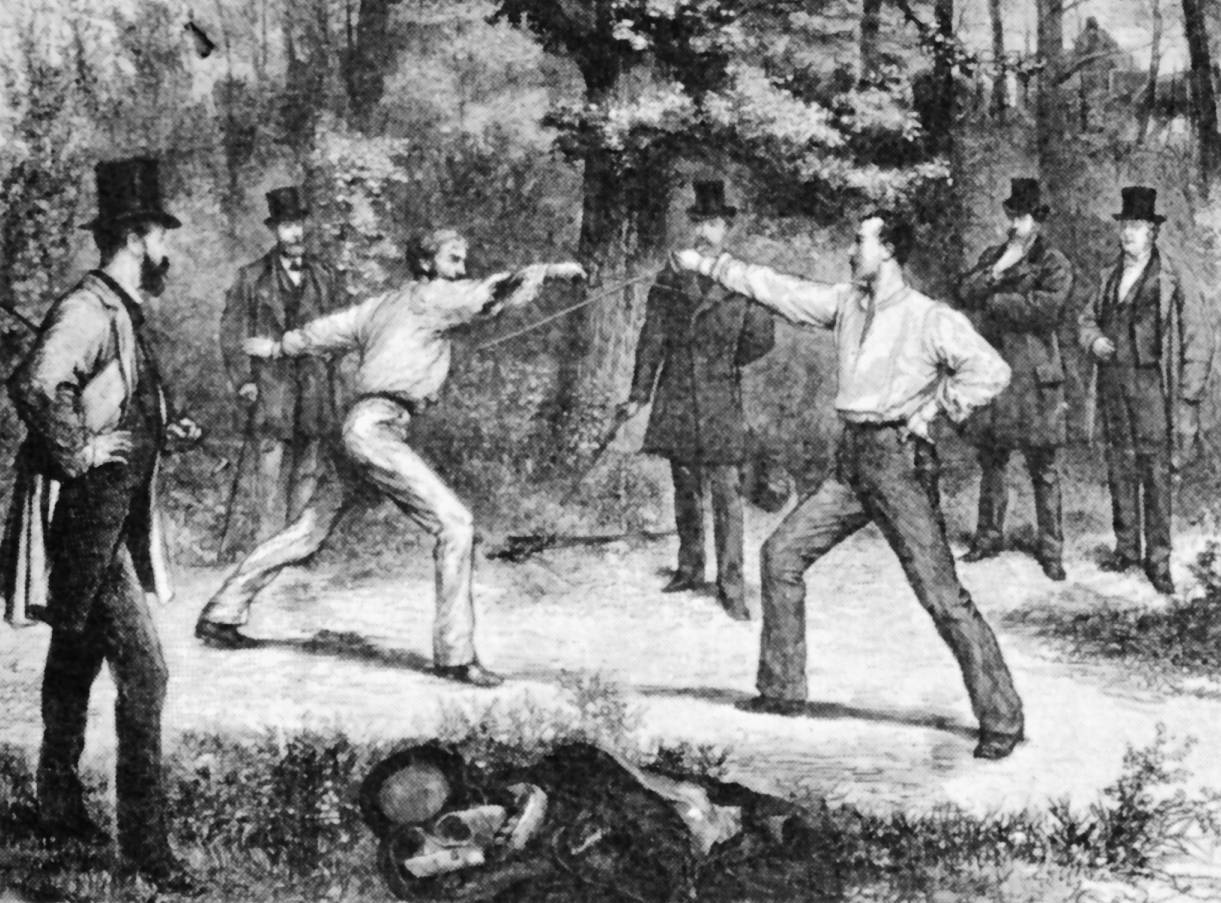
The Code Of Honor—A Duel in the Bois De Boulogne, Near Paris, wood-engraving after Godefroy Durand, Harper's Weekly (January 1875)

A duel is an arranged engagement in combat between two people with matched weapons.

During the 17th and 18th centuries (and earlier), duels were mostly single combats fought with swords (the rapier and later the small sword), but beginning in the late 18th century in England, duels were more commonly fought using pistols. Fencing and shooting continued to coexist throughout the 19th century.

The duel was based on a code of honor. Duels were fought not to kill the opponent but to gain "satisfaction", that is, to restore one's honor by demonstrating a willingness to risk one's life for it. As such, the tradition of dueling was reserved for the male members of nobility; however, in the modern era, it extended to those of the upper classes. On occasion, duels with swords or pistols were fought between women.

Legislation against dueling dates back to the medieval period. The Fourth Council of the Lateran (1215) outlawed duels and civil legislation in the Holy Roman Empire against dueling was passed in the wake of the Thirty Years' War. From the early 17th century, duels became illegal in the countries where they were practiced. Dueling largely fell out of favour in England by the mid-19th century and in Continental Europe by the turn of the 20th century. Dueling declined in the Eastern United States in the 19th century and by the time of the American Civil War, dueling had begun to wane even in the South. Public opinion, not legislation, caused the change. Research has linked the decline of dueling to increases in state capacity.

== History ==
=== Early history and Middle Ages ===
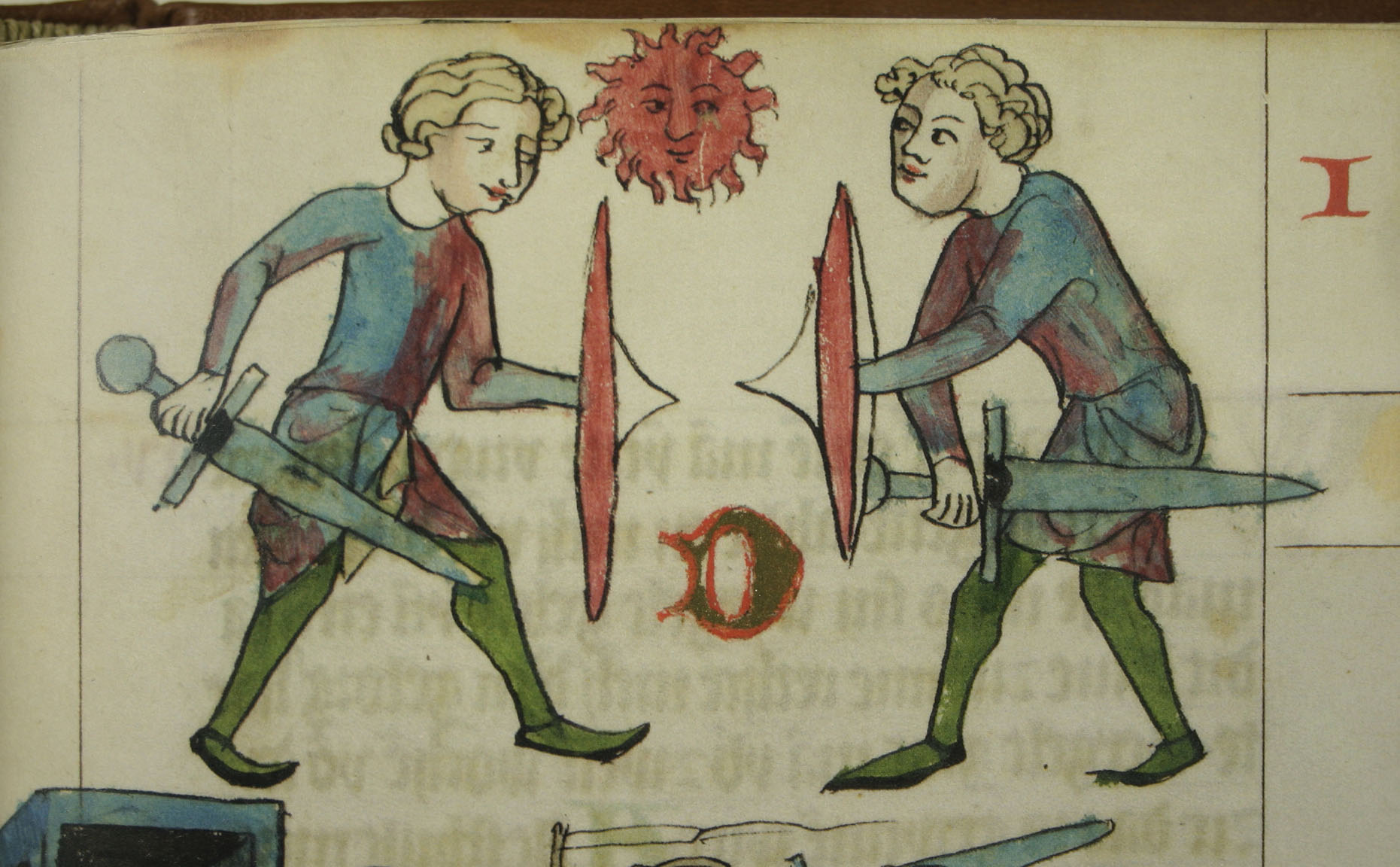
Depiction of a judicial combat in the Dresden codex of the Sachsenspiegel (early to mid-14th century), illustrating the provision that the two combatants must "share the sun", i.e. align themselves perpendicular to the sun so that neither has an advantage.

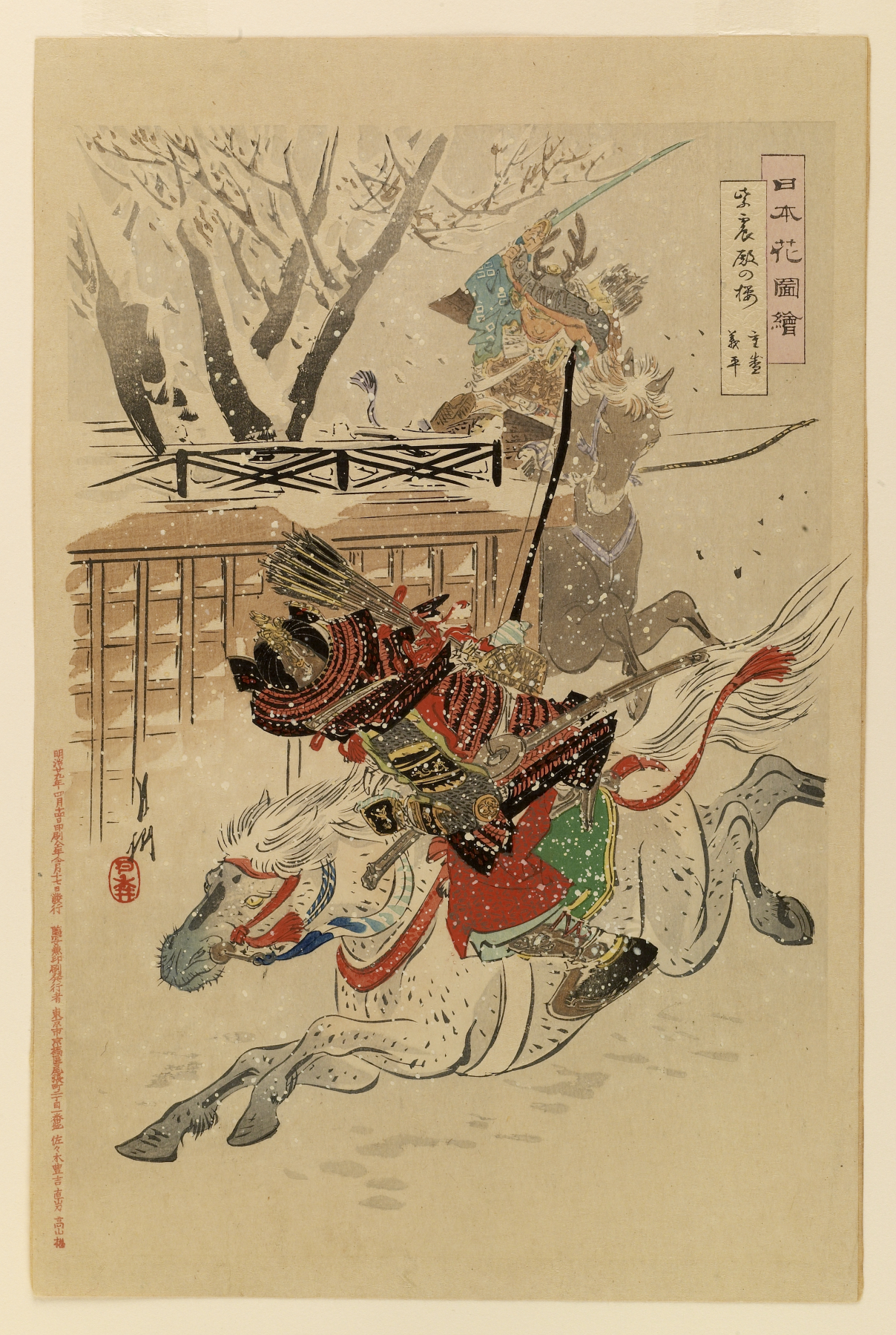
Minamoto no Yoshihira and Taira no Shigemori (Japan in 1159)

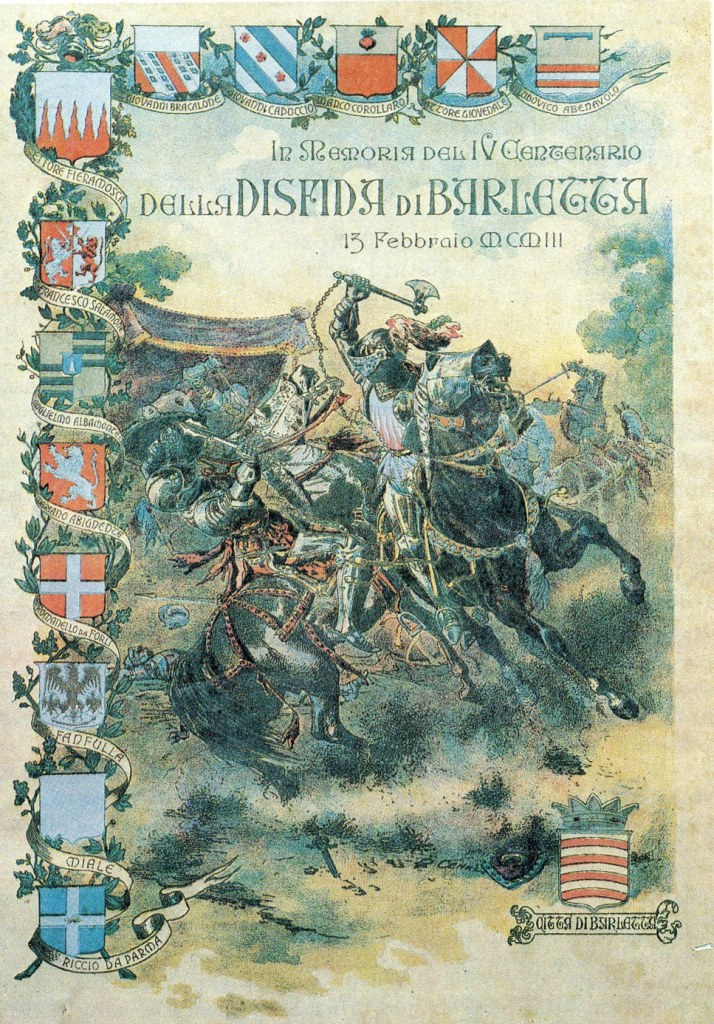
Commemorative poster for the fourth centennial of the Disfida di Barletta, the Challenge of Barletta, fought on 13 February 1503 between 13 Italian and 13 French knights all shown wearing full plate armour.

In Western society, the formal concept of a duel developed out of the medieval judicial duel and older pre-Christian practices such as the Viking Age holmgang. In medieval society, judicial duels were fought by knights and squires to end various disputes. Countries such as France, Spain, Germany, England, and Ireland practiced this tradition. Judicial combat took two forms in medieval society, the feat of arms and chivalric combat. The feat of arms was used to settle hostilities between two large parties and supervised by a judge. The battle was fought as a result of a slight or challenge to one party's honor which could not be resolved by a court. Weapons were standardized and typical of a knight's armoury, for example longswords or polearms; however, weapon quality and augmentations were at the discretion of the knight; for example, a spiked hand guard or an extra grip for half-swording. The parties involved would wear their own armour; for example, one knight wearing full plate might face another wearing chain mail. The duel lasted until one party could no longer fight back. In early cases, the defeated party was then executed. This type of duel soon evolved into the more chivalric pas d'armes or "passage of arms", a chivalric hastilude that evolved in the late 14th century and remained popular through the 15th century. A knight or group of knights (tenans or "holders") would stake out a travelled spot, such as a bridge or city gate, and let it be known that any other knight who wished to pass (venans or "comers") must first fight, or be disgraced. If a traveling venans did not have weapons or horse to meet the challenge, one might be provided, and if the venans chose not to fight, he would leave his spurs behind as a sign of humiliation. If a lady passed unescorted, she would leave behind a glove or scarf, to be rescued and returned to her by a future knight who passed that way.

The Catholic Church was critical of dueling throughout medieval history, frowning both on the traditions of judicial combat and on the duel on points of honor among the nobility. Judicial duels were deprecated by the Lateran Council of 1215, but the judicial duel persisted in the Holy Roman Empire into the 15th century.

=== Renaissance and early modern Europe ===
During the early Renaissance, dueling established the status of a respectable gentleman and was an accepted manner to resolve disputes.

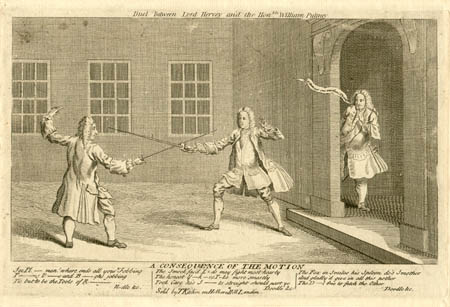
Dueling remained highly popular in European society, despite various attempts at banning the practice.

The first published code duello, or "code of dueling", appeared in Renaissance Italy. The first formalized national code was that of France, during the Renaissance. From the late 1580s to the 1620s, an estimated 10,000 French individuals (most of them nobility) were killed in duels.

By the 17th century, dueling had become regarded as a prerogative of the aristocracy, throughout Europe, and attempts to discourage or suppress it generally failed. For example, King Louis XIII of France outlawed dueling in 1626, a law which remained in force afterwards, and his successor Louis XIV intensified efforts to wipe out the duel. Despite these efforts, dueling continued unabated, and it is estimated that between 1685 and 1716, French officers fought 10,000 duels, leading to over 400 deaths.

The Duellplakatet (English; Duel Placard) was a document issued in 1662 that explicitly banned duels in Sweden. Anyone who attempted to duel despite the ban could be fined or expelled. Individuals killed in a duel were denied traditional Christian burials and were instead interred as criminals. The ban was repeated in new ordinances in 1682 and 1738.

In Ireland, as late as 1777, a code of practice was drawn up for the regulation of duels, at the summer assizes in the town of Clonmel, County Tipperary. A copy of the code, known as 'the twenty-six commandments', was to be kept in a gentleman's pistol case for reference should a dispute arise regarding procedure.

=== Enlightenment-era opposition ===
By the late 18th century, Enlightenment era values began to influence society with new self-conscious ideas about politeness, civil behavior, and new attitudes toward violence. The cultivated art of politeness demanded that there should be no outward displays of anger or violence, and the concept of honor became more personalized.

By the 1770s, the practice of dueling was increasingly coming under attack from many sections of enlightened society, as a violent relic of Europe's medieval past unsuited for modern life. As England began to industrialize and benefit from urban planning and more effective police forces, the culture of street violence in general began to slowly wane. The growing middle class maintained their reputation with recourse to either bringing charges of libel, or to the fast-growing print media of the early 19th century, where they could defend their honor and resolve conflicts through correspondence in newspapers.

Influential new intellectual trends at the turn of the 19th century bolstered the anti-dueling campaign; the utilitarian philosophy of Jeremy Bentham stressed that praiseworthy actions were exclusively restricted to those that maximize human welfare and happiness, and the Evangelical notion of the "Christian conscience" began to actively promote social activism. Individuals in the Clapham Sect and similar societies, who had successfully campaigned for the abolition of slavery, condemned dueling as ungodly violence and as an egocentric culture of honor.

=== Modern history ===
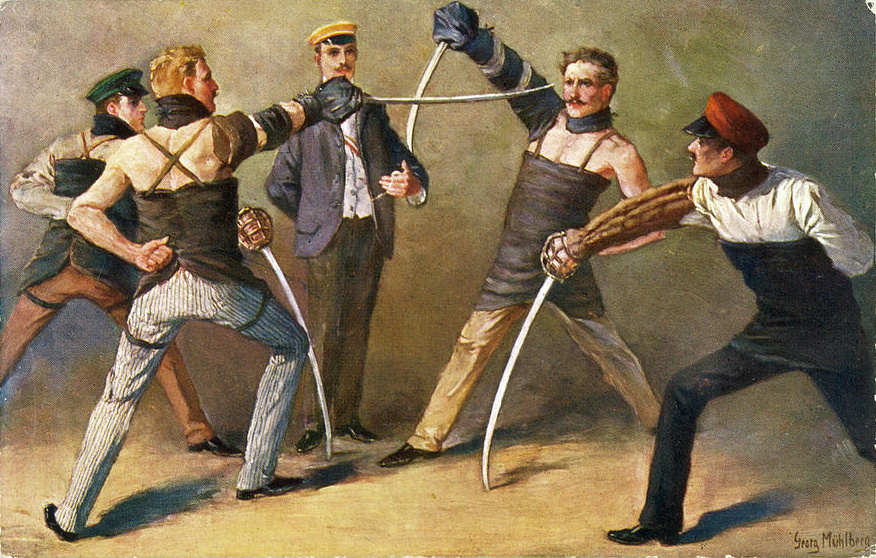
German students of a Burschenschaft fighting a sabre duel, around 1900, painting by Georg Mühlberg (1863–1925)

The former United States Secretary of the Treasury Alexander Hamilton was killed in a duel against the sitting Vice President Aaron Burr in 1804. Between 1798 and the Civil War, the U.S. Navy lost two-thirds as many officers to dueling as it did in combat at sea, including naval hero Stephen Decatur. Many of those killed or wounded were midshipmen or junior officers. Despite prominent deaths, dueling persisted because of contemporary ideals of chivalry, particularly in the South, and because of the threat of ridicule if a challenge was rejected.

By about 1770, the duel underwent a number of important changes in England. Firstly, unlike their counterparts in many continental nations, English duelists enthusiastically adopted the pistol, and sword duels dwindled. Special sets of dueling pistols were crafted for the wealthiest of noblemen for this purpose. Also, the office of 'second' developed into 'seconds' or 'friends' being chosen by the aggrieved parties to conduct their honor dispute. These friends would attempt to resolve a dispute upon terms acceptable to both parties and, should this fail, they would arrange and oversee the mechanics of the encounter.

In England, to kill in the course of a duel was formally judged as murder, but generally the courts were very lax in applying the law, as they were sympathetic to the culture of honor. Despite being a criminal act, military officers in many countries could be punished if they failed to fight a duel when the occasion called for it. In 1814, a British officer was court-martialed, cashiered, and dismissed from the army for failing to issue a challenge after he was publicly insulted. This attitude lingered on – Queen Victoria even expressed a hope that Lord Cardigan, prosecuted for wounding another in a duel, "would get off easily". The Anglican Church was generally hostile to dueling, but non-conformist sects in particular began to actively campaign against it.

By 1840, dueling had declined dramatically; when the 7th Earl of Cardigan was acquitted on a legal technicality for homicide in connection with a duel with one of his former officers, outrage was expressed in the media, with The Times alleging that there was deliberate, high-level complicity to leave the loophole in the prosecution and reporting the view that "in England there is one law for the rich and another for the poor", and The Examiner describing the verdict as "a defeat of justice".

The last-known fatal duel between Englishmen in England occurred in 1845, when James Alexander Seton had an altercation with Henry Hawkey over the affections of his wife, leading to a duel at Browndown, near Gosport. However, the last-known fatal duel to occur in England was between two French political refugees, Frederic Cournet and Emmanuel Barthélemy near Englefield Green in 1852; the former was killed. In both cases, the winners of the duels, Hawkey and Barthélemy, were tried for murder. But Hawkey was acquitted and Barthélemy was convicted only of manslaughter; he served seven months in prison.

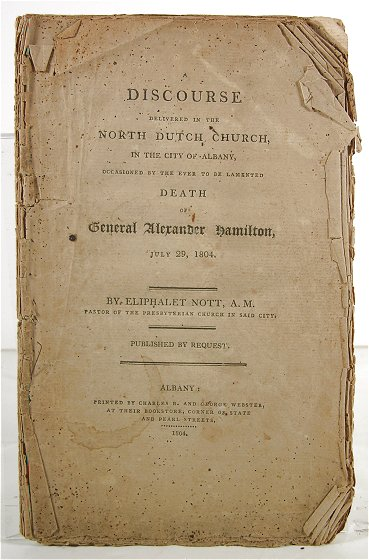
An anti-dueling sermon written by an acquaintance of Alexander Hamilton.

Dueling also began to be criticized in America in the late 18th century; Benjamin Franklin denounced the practice as uselessly violent, and George Washington encouraged his officers to refuse challenges during the American Revolutionary War because he believed that the death by dueling of officers would have threatened the success of the war effort.

In the early nineteenth century, American writer and activist John Neal took up dueling as his earliest reform issue, attacking the institution in his first novel, Keep Cool (1817), and referring to it in an essay that same year as "the unqualified evidence of manhood". Ironically, Neal was challenged to a duel by a fellow Baltimore lawyer for insults published in his 1823 novel Randolph. He refused and mocked the challenge in his next novel, Errata, published the same year.

Reports of dueling gained in popularity in the first half of the 19th century especially in the South and the states of the Old Southwest. However, in this regional context, the term dueling had severely degenerated from its original 18th-century definition as a formal social custom among the wealthy classes, using fixed rules of conduct. Instead, 'dueling' was used by the contemporary press of the day to refer to any melee knife or gun fight between two contestants, where the clear object was simply to kill one's opponent.

Dueling began an irreversible decline in the aftermath of the Civil War. Even in the South, public opinion increasingly came to regard the practice as little more than bloodshed.

==== Prominent 19th-century duels ====
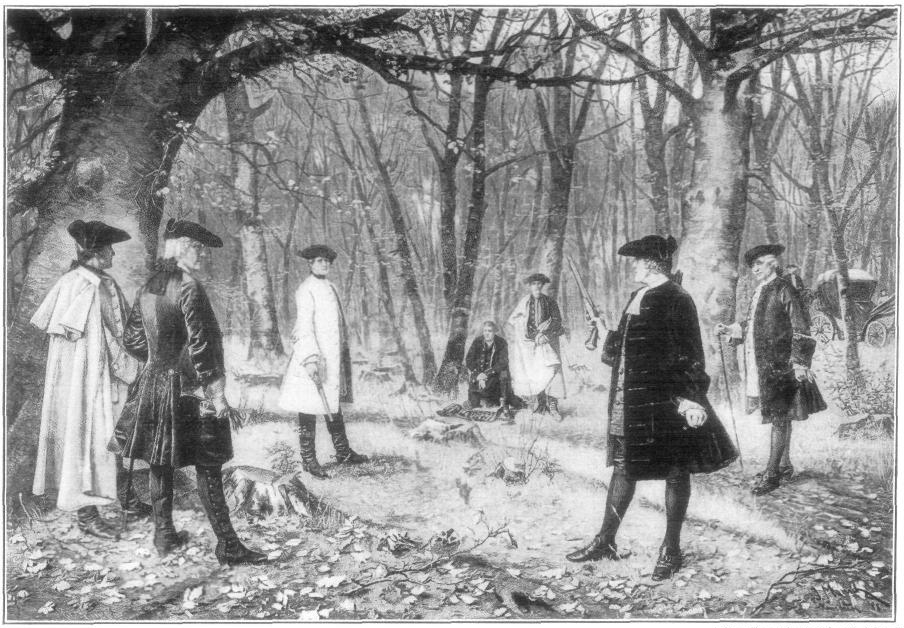
A 1902 illustration after painting Ein Ehrenhandel by Joseph Munsch (Austrian, 1832–1896) showing Alexander Hamilton fighting his fatal duel with Vice President Aaron Burr, July 1804

==== United States ====
The most notorious American duel is the Burr–Hamilton duel, in which notable Federalist and former Secretary of the Treasury Alexander Hamilton was fatally wounded by his political rival, the sitting Vice President Aaron Burr. This was later popularized in the musical Hamilton, which premiered in 2015.

Another American politician, Andrew Jackson, later to serve as a General Officer in the U.S. Army and to become the seventh president, fought two duels, though some claim he fought many more. In a duel on May 30, 1806, he killed Charles Dickinson, suffering himself from a chest wound that caused him a lifetime of pain. Jackson also reportedly engaged in a bloodless duel with a lawyer and in 1803 came very near dueling with John Sevier. Jackson also engaged in a frontier brawl (not a duel) with Thomas Hart Benton in 1813.

In 1827, during the Sandbar Fight, James Bowie was involved in an arranged pistol duel that quickly escalated into a knife-fighting melee, not atypical of American practices at the time.

On September 22, 1842, future President Abraham Lincoln, at the time an Illinois state legislator, met to duel with state auditor James Shields, but friends intervened and persuaded them against it.

In 1864, American writer Mark Twain, then a contributor to the New York Sunday Mercury, narrowly avoided fighting a duel with a rival newspaper editor, apparently through the intervention of his second, who exaggerated Twain's prowess with a pistol.

==== France ====
In 1808, two Frenchmen are said to have fought in balloons over Paris, each attempting to shoot and puncture the other's balloon. One duellist is said to have been shot down and killed with his second. This duel may be a journalistic invention : the event is not documented by press archives or official French reports contemporary to the period; the oldest known reference being a 1863 article from a British newspaper.

On 30 May 1832, French mathematician Évariste Galois was mortally wounded in a duel at the age of twenty, cutting short his promising mathematical career. He spent the night before the duel writing mathematics; the inclusion of a note claiming that he did not have time to finish a proof spawned the urban legend that he wrote his most important results on that night.

In 1843, two Frenchmen are said to have fought a duel by means of throwing billiard balls at each other. This story lacks references in French sources from the period.

The last duel of honor in France took place between René Ribière and Gaston Defferre on April 21, 1967.

==== Ireland ====
Irish political leader Daniel O'Connell killed John D'Esterre in a duel in February 1815. O'Connell offered D'Esterre's widow a pension equal to the amount her husband had been earning at the time, but the Corporation of Dublin, of which D'Esterre had been a member, rejected O'Connell's offer and voted the promised sum to D'Esterre's wife themselves. D'Esterre's wife consented to accept an allowance for her daughter, which O'Connell regularly paid for more than thirty years until his death. The memory of the duel haunted him for the remainder of his life.

==== Russia ====
The works of Russian poet Alexander Pushkin contain a number of duels, notably Onegin's duel with Lensky in Eugene Onegin. These turned out to be prophetic, as Pushkin himself was mortally wounded in a controversial duel with Georges d'Anthès, a French officer rumored to be his wife's lover. D'Anthès, who was accused of cheating in this duel, married Pushkin's sister-in-law and went on to become a French minister and senator.

==== Germany ====
In the 1860s, Otto von Bismarck was reported to have challenged Rudolf Virchow to a duel. Virchow, being entitled to choose the weapons, chose two pork sausages, one infected with the roundworm Trichinella; the two would each choose and eat a sausage. Bismarck reportedly declined. The story could be apocryphal, however.

==== Scotland ====
In Scotland, James Stuart of Dunearn, was tried and acquitted after a duel that fatally wounded Sir Alexander Boswell. George Buchan published his own examination of arguments in favour of duelling alongside an account of the trial, taken in shorthand. Other duels were fought in Scotland mostly between soldiers or the gentry with several subsequently brought to the law courts.

==== Canada ====
The last known fatal duel in Ontario was in Perth, in 1833, when Robert Lyon challenged John Wilson to a pistol duel after a quarrel over remarks Lyon had made about a local school teacher, whom Wilson eventually married after Lyon was killed in the duel. Victoria, British Columbia, was known to have been the scene of at least two duels near the time of the gold rush. One involved a British man named George Sloane, and an American, John Liverpool, both arriving via San Francisco in 1858. In a duel with pistols, Sloane was fatally injured and Liverpool soon returned to the US. The fight originally started on board the ship over a young woman, Miss Bradford, and then carried on later in Victoria's tent city. Another duel, involving a Mr. Muir, took place around 1861, but was moved to an American island near Victoria.

=== Decline in the 19th and 20th centuries ===
Duels had mostly ceased to be fought to the death by the late 19th century.

By the start of World War I, dueling had not only been made illegal almost everywhere in the Western world, but was also widely seen as an anachronism. Military establishments in most countries frowned on dueling because officers were the main contestants. Officers were often trained at military academies at government expense; when officers killed or disabled one another it imposed an unnecessary financial and leadership strain on a military organization, making dueling unpopular with high-ranking officers.

With the end of the duel, the dress sword lost its position as an indispensable part of a gentleman's wardrobe, a development described as an "archaeological terminus" by Ewart Oakeshott, concluding the long period during which the sword had been a visible attribute of the free man, beginning as early as three millennia ago with the Bronze Age sword.

==== Legislation ====
Emperor Charles I outlawed dueling in Austria-Hungary in 1917. Germany (the various states of the Holy Roman Empire) has a history of laws against dueling going back to the late medieval period, with a large amount of legislation (Duellmandate) dating from the period after the Thirty Years' War. Prussia outlawed dueling in 1851, and the law was inherited by the Reichsstrafgesetzbuch of the German Empire after 1871. Pope Leo XIII in the encyclical Pastoralis officii (1891) asked the bishops of Germany and Austria–Hungary to impose penalties on duellists. In Nazi-era Germany, legislation on dueling was tightened in 1937. After World War II, West German authorities persecuted academic fencing as duels until 1951, when a Göttingen court established the legal distinction between academic fencing and dueling.

In 1839, after the death of Representative Jonathan Cilley, dueling was outlawed in Washington, D.C. A constitutional amendment was even proposed for the federal constitution to outlaw dueling. Some U.S. states' constitutions, such as West Virginia's, contain explicit prohibitions on dueling to this day. In Kentucky, the state constitution of 1891, which remains in effect, mandates that all state and local officeholders, attorneys who are members of the state bar and delegates to the Electoral College must swear or affirm that they had never engaged in a duel with deadly weapons, acted as a second in a duel with deadly weapons or otherwise aided or assisted anyone thus offending. Other U.S. states, like Mississippi until the late 1970s, formerly had prohibitions on dueling in their state constitutions, but later repealed them, whereas others, such as Iowa, constitutionally prohibited known duelers from holding political office until the early 1990s.

From 1921 until 1992, Uruguay was one of the few places where duels were fully legal. During that period, a duel was legal in cases where "an honor tribunal of three respectable citizens, one chosen by each side and the third chosen by the other two, had ruled that sufficient cause for a duel existed".

==== Pistol sport dueling ====
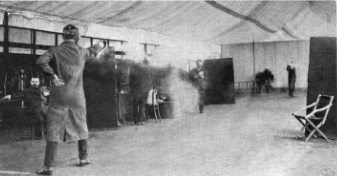
Pistol dueling as an associate event at the 1908 London Olympic Games

In the late 19th and early 20th centuries, pistol dueling became popular as a sport in France. The duelists were armed with conventional pistols, but the cartridges had wax bullets and were without any powder charge; the bullet was propelled only by the explosion of the cartridge's primer.

Participants wore heavy, protective clothing and a metal helmet with a glass eye-screen. The pistols were fitted with a shield that protected the firing hand.

===== Olympic dueling =====
Pistol dueling was an associate (non-medal) event at the 1908 Summer Olympics in London.

==== Late survivals ====
Dueling culture survived in France, Italy, and Latin America well into the 20th century. After World War II, duels had become rare even in France, and those that still occurred were covered in the press as eccentricities. Duels in France in this period, while still taken seriously as a matter of honor, were not fought to the death. They consisted of fencing with the épée mostly in a fixed distance with the aim of drawing blood from the opponent's arm.

In 1949, former Vichy official Jean-Louis Tixier-Vignancour fought school teacher Roger Nordmann. The last known duel in France took place in 1967, when Socialist Deputy and Mayor of Marseille Gaston Defferre insulted Gaullist Deputy René Ribière at the French Parliament and was subsequently challenged to a duel fought with swords. Ribière lost the duel, having been wounded twice. In Uruguay, a pistol duel was fought in 1971 between Danilo Sena and Enrique Erro, in which neither of the combatants was injured.

Various modern jurisdictions still retain mutual combat laws, which allow disputes to be settled via consensual unarmed combat, which are essentially unarmed duels, though it may still be illegal for such fights to result in grievous bodily harm or death. Few if any modern jurisdictions allow armed duels.

== Rules ==
=== Offence and satisfaction ===
The traditional situation that led to a duel often happened after a perceived offense, whether real or imagined, when one party would demand satisfaction from the offender. The demand was commonly symbolized by an inescapably insulting gesture, such as throwing a glove to the ground before the offender.

Usually, challenges were delivered in writing by one or more close friends who acted as "seconds". The challenge, written in formal language, laid out the real or imagined grievances and a demand for satisfaction. The challenged party then had the choice of accepting or refusing the challenge. Grounds for refusing the challenge could include that it was frivolous, or that the challenger was not generally recognized as a "gentleman" since dueling was limited to persons of equal social status. However, care had to be taken before declining a challenge, as it could result in accusations of cowardice or be perceived as an insult to the challenger's seconds if it was implied that they were acting on behalf of someone of low social standing. Participation in a duel could be honorably refused on account of a major difference in age between the parties and, to a lesser extent, in cases of social inferiority on the part of the challenger. Such inferiority had to be immediately obvious, however. As author Bertram Wyatt-Brown states, "with social distinctions often difficult to measure", most men could not escape on such grounds without the appearance of cowardice.

Once a challenge was accepted, if not done already, both parties (known as "principals") would appoint trusted representatives to act as their seconds with no further direct communication between the principals being allowed until the dispute was settled. The seconds had a number of responsibilities, of which the first was to do all in their power to avert bloodshed provided their principal's honor was not compromised. This could involve back and forth correspondence about a mutually agreeable lesser course of action, such as a formal apology for the alleged offense.

In the event that the seconds failed to persuade their principals to avoid a fight, they then attempted to agree on terms for the duel that would limit the chance of a fatal outcome, consistent with the generally accepted guidelines for affairs of honor. The exact rules or etiquette for dueling varied by time and locale but were usually referred to as the code duello. In most cases, the challenged party had the choice of weapons, with swords being favored in many parts of continental Europe and pistols in the United States and Great Britain.

It was the job of the seconds to make all of the arrangements in advance, including how long the duel would last and what conditions would end the duel. Often sword duels were only fought until blood was drawn, thus severely limiting the likelihood of death or grave injury since a scratch could be considered as satisfying honor. In pistol duels, the number of shots to be permitted and the range were set out. Care was taken by the seconds to ensure the ground chosen gave no unfair advantage to either party. A doctor or surgeon was usually arranged to be on hand. Other things often arranged by the seconds could go into minute details that might seem odd in the modern world, such as the dress code (duels were often formal affairs), the number and names of any other witnesses to be present and whether or not refreshments would be served.

=== Field of honor ===
The chief criteria for choosing the field of honor were isolation, to avoid discovery and interruption by the authorities; and jurisdictional ambiguity, to avoid legal consequences. Islands in rivers dividing two jurisdictions were popular dueling sites; the cliffs below Weehawken on the Hudson River where the Hamilton–Burr duel occurred were a popular field of honor for New York duelists because of the uncertainty of whether New York or New Jersey had jurisdiction. Duels traditionally took place at dawn, when the poor light would make the participants less likely to be seen, and to force an interval for reconsideration or sobering up.

For some time before the mid-18th century, swordsmen dueling at dawn often carried lanterns to see each other. This happened so regularly that fencing manuals integrated lanterns into their lessons. An example of this is using the lantern to parry blows and blind the opponent. The manuals sometimes show the combatants carrying the lantern in the left hand wrapped behind the back, which is still one of the traditional positions for the off-hand in modern fencing.

=== Conditions ===
At the choice of the offended party, the duel could be fought to a number of conclusions:

- To first blood, in which case the duel would be ended as soon as one man was wounded, even if the wound was minor.
- Until one man was so severely wounded as to be physically unable to continue the duel.
- To the death (or à l'outrance), in which case there would be no satisfaction until one party was mortally wounded.
- In the case of pistol duels, each party would fire one shot. If neither man was hit and if the challenger stated that he was satisfied, the duel would be declared over. If the challenger was not satisfied, a pistol duel could continue until one man was wounded or killed, but to have more than three exchanges of fire was considered barbaric, and, on the rare occasion that no hits were achieved, somewhat ridiculous.

Under the latter conditions, one or both parties could intentionally miss in order to fulfill the conditions of the duel, without loss of either life or honor. However, doing so, known as deloping, could imply that one's opponent was not worth shooting. This practice occurred despite being expressly banned by the Irish code duello of 1777. Rule XII stated: "No dumb shooting or firing in the air is admissible in any case ... children's play must be dishonourable on one side or the other, and is accordingly prohibited."

Practices varied, however, but unless the challenger was of a higher social standing, such as a baron or prince challenging a knight, the person being challenged was allowed to decide the time and weapons used in the duel. The offended party could stop the duel at any time if he deemed his honor satisfied. In some duels, the seconds would take the place of the primary duelist if the primary was not able to finish the duel. This was usually done in duels with swords, where one's expertise was sometimes limited. The second would also act as a witness.

=== Pistol duel ===
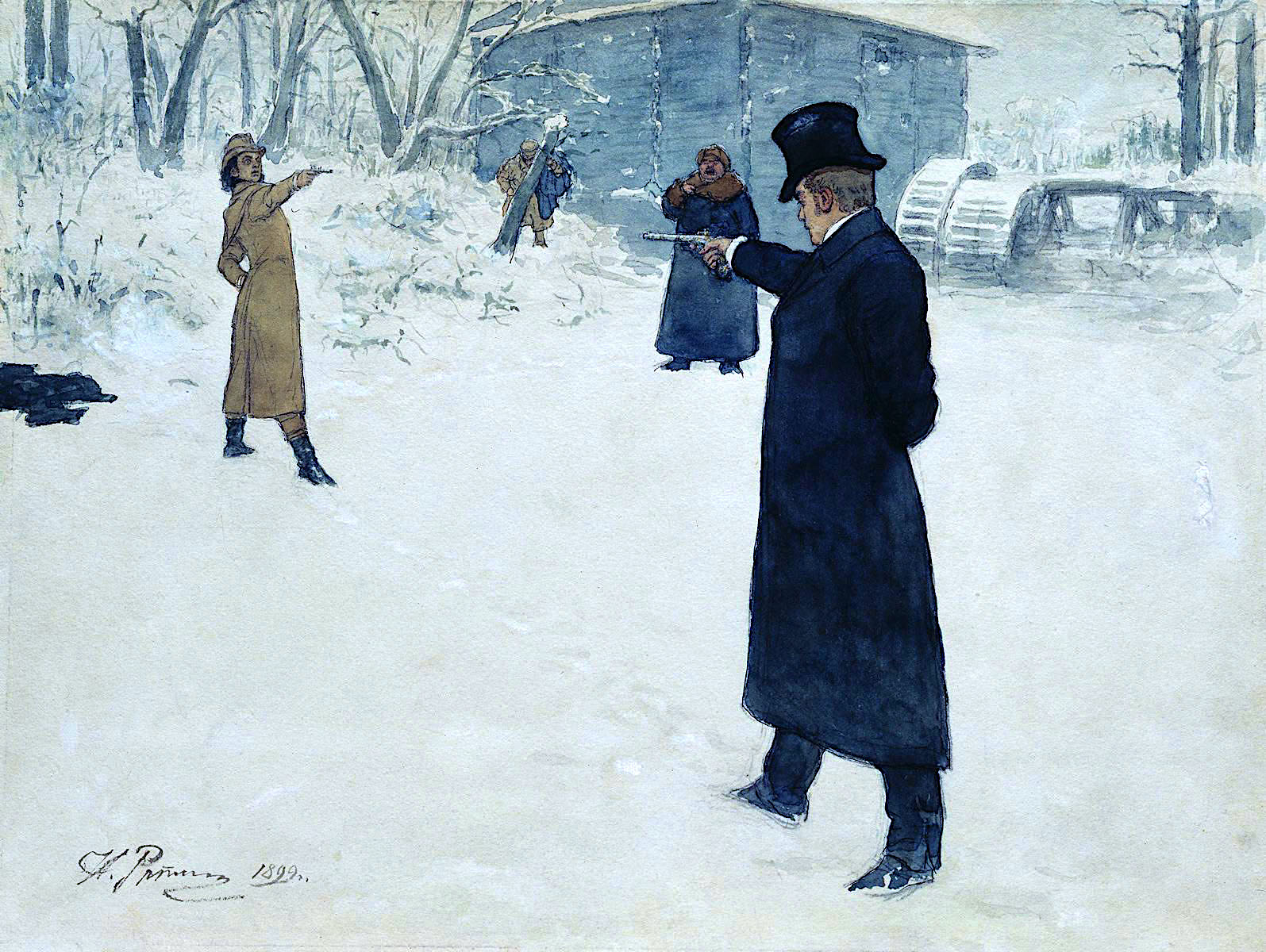
The fictional pistol duel between Eugene Onegin and Vladimir Lensky. Watercolour by Ilya Repin (1899)

There were various methods of pistol dueling. The mode where the two duelists stood back-to-back, walked away from each other for a set number of paces before turning and firing was known as the "French" method. Another method required the duelists to stand still at an agreed distance and fire simultaneously on a signal – this was the type of duel favored in Britain. A variant of this required the duelists to take turns to shoot, with the challenger shooting first or the right of first shot being decided by a coin toss.

The distance at which the pistols were fired might depend on local custom, the wishes of the duelists or sometimes the severity of the insult. The American dueling code of 1838 suggested a distance between 10 and 20 paces. There were incidences of pistol duels taking place at just two or three paces, with a virtual certainty of one or both duelists being injured or killed.

A method popular in Continental Europe was known as a barrier duel or a duel à volonté ("at pleasure"); it did not have a set shooting distance. The two duelists began some distance apart. Between them there were two lines on the ground separated by an agreed distance – this constituted the barrier and they were forbidden to cross it. After the signal to begin, they could advance towards the barrier to close the distance and were permitted to fire at any time. However, the one that shot first was required to stand still and allow his opponent to walk right up to his barrier line and fire back at leisure.

Many historical duels were prevented by the difficulty of arranging the "methodus pugnandi". In the instance of Richard Brocklesby, the number of paces could not be agreed upon; and in the affair between Mark Akenside and Ballow, one had determined never to fight in the morning, and the other that he would never fight in the afternoon. John Wilkes, "who did not stand upon ceremony in these little affairs", when asked by Lord Talbot how many times they were to fire, replied, "just as often as your Lordship pleases; I have brought a bag of bullets and a flask of gunpowder."

== Western traditions ==
=== Europe ===
==== Great Britain and Ireland ====
The duel arrived at the end of the 16th century with the influx of Italian honor and courtesy literature – most notably Baldassare Castiglione's Libro del Cortegiano (Book of the Courtier), published in 1528, and Girolamo Muzio's Il Duello, published in 1550. These stressed the need to protect one's reputation and social mask and prescribed the circumstances under which an insulted party should issue a challenge. The word duel was introduced in the 1590s, modeled after Medieval Latin duellum (an archaic Latin form of bellum "war", but associated by popular etymology with duo "two", hence "one-to-one combat").

Soon domestic literature was being produced such as Simon Robson's The Courte of Ciuill Courtesie, published in 1577. Dueling was further propagated by the arrival of Italian fencing masters such as Rocco Bonetti and Vincento Saviolo. By the reign of James I dueling was well entrenched within a militarized peerage – one of the most important duels being that between Edward Bruce, 2nd Lord Kinloss and Edward Sackville (later the 4th Earl of Dorset) in 1613, during which Bruce was killed. James I encouraged Francis Bacon as Solicitor-General to prosecute would-be duelists in the Court of Star Chamber, leading to about two hundred prosecutions between 1603 and 1625. He also issued an edict against dueling in 1614 and is believed to have supported production of an anti-dueling tract by the Earl of Northampton.

Dueling, however, continued to spread out from the court, notably into the army. In the mid-17th century it was for a time checked by the activities of the Parliamentarians whose Articles of War specified the death penalty for would-be duelists. Nevertheless, dueling survived and increased markedly with the Restoration. Among the difficulties facing anti-dueling campaigners was that although monarchs uniformly proclaimed their general hostility to dueling, they were nevertheless very reluctant to see their own favorites punished. In 1712 both the Duke of Hamilton and Charles 4th Baron Mohun were killed in a celebrated duel induced by political rivalry and squabbles over an inheritance.

By the 1780s, the values of the duel had spread into the broader and emerging society of gentlemen. Research shows that much the largest group of later duelists were military officers, followed by the young sons of the metropolitan elite (see Banks, A Polite Exchange of Bullets). Dueling was also popular for a time among doctors and, in particular, in the legal professions. Quantifying the number of duels in Britain is difficult, but there are about 1,000 attested between 1785 and 1845 with fatality rates at least 15% and probably somewhat higher.

In 1777, at the Summer assizes in the town of Clonmel, County Tipperary, a code of practice was drawn up for the regulation of duels. It was agreed by delegates from the Counties of Tipperary, Galway, Mayo, Sligo and Roscommon, and intended for general adoption throughout Ireland. An amended version known as 'The Irish Code of Honor', and consisting of 25 rules, was adopted in some parts of the United States. The first article of the code stated:

Rule 1.—The first offence requires the apology, although the retort may have been more offensive than the insult.

—Example: A. tells B. he is impertinent, &C.; B. retorts, that he lies; yet A. must make the first apology, because he gave the first offence, and then, (after one fire,) B. may explain away the retort by subsequent apology.

The 19th-century Irish statesman Daniel O'Connell took part in a duel in 1815. Following the death of his opponent, John D'Esterre, O'Connell repented and from that time wore a white glove on his right hand when attending Mass as a public symbol of his regret. Despite numerous challenges, he refused ever to fight another duel.

The last duel in England was fought in 1852 between two French political exiles. In 1862, in an article entitled Dead (and gone) Shots, Charles Dickens recalled the rules and myths of Irish dueling in his periodical All the Year Round.

===== British prime ministers who took part in duels =====
Four Prime Ministers of the United Kingdom engaged in duels, although only two of them – Pitt and Wellington – held the office at the time of their duels.

- William Petty, 2nd Earl of Shelburne fought a duel with Colonel William Fullarton (1780)
- Pitt–Tierney duel. William Pitt the Younger fought a duel with George Tierney (1798)
- Canning–Castlereagh duel. George Canning fought a duel with Lord Castlereagh (1809)
- Wellington–Winchilsea duel. The Duke of Wellington fought a duel with Lord Winchilsea (1829)

==== Holy Roman Empire and Germany ====
In Early New High German, the duel was known as Kampf, or Kampffechten. The German dueling tradition originates in the Late Middle Ages, within the German school of fencing. In the 15th century, duels were fought between members of the nobility wearing full plate armor. During the late 16th and the 17th century, this tradition was gradually replaced with the modern fencing with the rapier following the Dardi school, while at the same time the practice of dueling spread to the bourgeois classes, especially among students.

The term Kampf is replaced by the modern German Duell during the same period, attested in the Latin form duellum from c. 1600, and as Duell from the 1640s. A modern remnant of German dueling culture is found in the non-lethal Mensur tradition in academic fencing.

==== Greece ====
In the Ionian Islands in the 19th century, there was a practice of formalized fighting between men over points of honor. Knives were the weapons used in such fights. They would begin with an exchange of sexually related insults in a public place such as a tavern, and the men would fight with the intention of slashing the other's face, rather than killing. As soon as blood was drawn onlookers would intervene to separate the men. The winner would often spit on his opponent and dip his neckerchief in the blood of the loser, or wipe the blood off his knife with it.

The winner would generally make no attempt to avoid arrest and would receive a light penalty, such as a short jail sentence and/or a small fine.

==== Poland ====
In Poland, duels have been known since the Middle Ages. The best-known Polish code was written as late as 1919 by Władysław Boziewicz. At this time duels were already prohibited in Poland, but the "Polish Honorary Code" was quite widely in use. Punishments for participation in duels were fairly mild – up to one year's imprisonment if the outcome of the duel was death or grievous bodily harm.

==== Russia ====
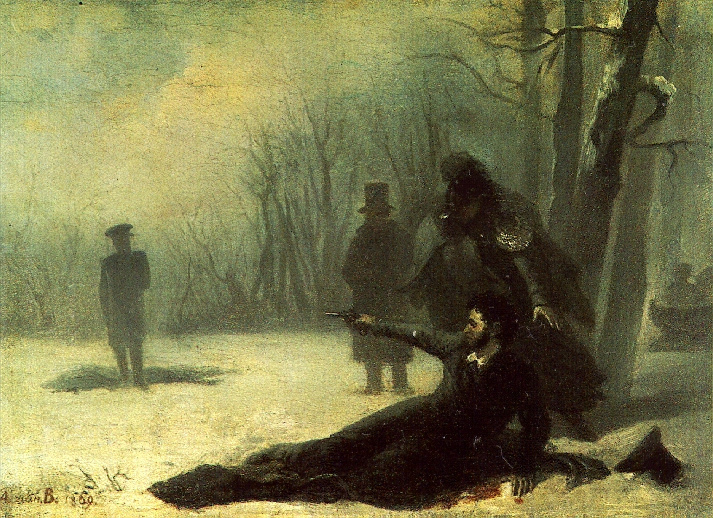
Depiction of the pistol duel of Alexander Pushkin vs. Georges d'Anthès, January 1837, an 1869 painting by Adrian Volkov

The tradition of dueling and the word duel itself were brought to Russia in the 17th century by adventurers in Russian service. Dueling quickly became so popular – and the number of casualties among the commanding ranks so high – that, in 1715, Emperor Peter I was forced to prohibit the practice on pain of having both duelists hanged. Despite this official ban, dueling became a significant military tradition in the Russian Empire with a detailed unwritten dueling code – which was eventually written down by V. Durasov and released in print in 1908. This code forbade duels between people of different ranks. For instance, an infantry captain could not challenge a major but could easily pick on a Titular Counsellor. On the other hand, a person of higher rank could not demean himself by challenging lower ranks; it was therefore up to his subordinates or servants to take revenge on their master's behalf.

Dueling was also common among prominent Russian writers, poets, and politicians. The Russian poet Alexander Pushkin fought 29 duels, challenging many prominent figures before being killed in a duel with Georges d'Anthès in 1837. His successor Mikhail Lermontov was killed four years later by fellow Army officer Nikolai Martynov. The dueling tradition gradually died out in the Russian Empire from the mid-19th century.

Scholarly analyses of duelling have also been produced by academics. Irina Reyfman's 1999 study, Ritualized Violence Russian Style: The Duel in Russian Culture and Literature, challenges the romanticized view of duelling as an honorable, regulated practice, arguing instead that it functioned as a brutal and manipulable ritual that reinforced violent hierarchies and produced long-term social harm. Situating duelling within Russian history from the reign of Peter the Great onward, Reyfman traces shifting cultural attitudes toward honor, masculinity, and violence across imperial, literary, and Soviet contexts.

Amanda DiGioia's monograph likewise examines duelling as a lens through which to analyze constructions of masculinity in Russia. The study situates contemporary Russian practices within broader masculinity scholarship, concluding that the persistent valorization of militarized masculine ideals constitutes an ongoing structural problem rather than a historical relic.

=== Americas ===
==== Latin America ====
Duels were common in much of South America during the 20th century, although generally illegal. In Argentina, during the 18th and 19th century, it was common for gauchos – cowboys – to resolve their disputes in a fight using working knives called facones. After the turn of the 19th century, when repeating handguns became more widely available, use of the facón as a close-combat weapon declined. Among the gauchos, many continued to wear the knife, though mostly as a tool. However, it was occasionally still used to settle arguments "of honor". In these situations two adversaries would attack with slashing attacks to the face, stopping when one could no longer see clearly through the blood.

In Peru there were several high-profile duels by politicians in the early part of the 20th century including one in 1957 involving Fernando Belaúnde Terry, who went on to become president. In 2002 Peruvian independent congressman Eittel Ramos challenged Vice President David Waisman to a duel with pistols, saying the vice president had insulted him. Waisman declined.

Uruguay decriminalized dueling in 1920, and in that year José Batlle y Ordóñez, a former President of Uruguay, killed Washington Beltran, editor of the newspaper El País, in a formal duel fought with pistols. In 1990, the La República owner Federico Fasano Mertens editor was challenged to a duel by an assistant police chief. Although not forbidden by the government, the duel did not take place. Dueling was once again prohibited in 1992.

A senator, and future President of Chile, Salvador Allende, was challenged to a duel by his colleague Raúl Rettig (who would later be his ambassador to Brazil) in 1952. Both men agreed to fire one shot at each other, and both fired into the air. At that time, dueling was already illegal in Chile.

There is a frequently quoted claim that dueling is legal in Paraguay if both parties are blood donors. No evidence exists that this is indeed true, and the notion has been outright denied by members of Paraguayan government.

==== United States ====
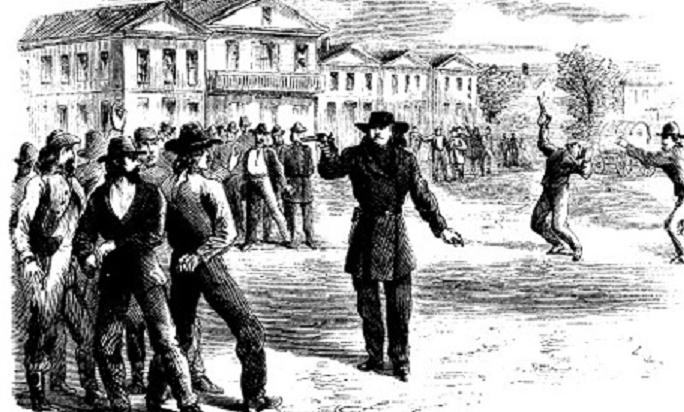
Wild Bill Hickok's duel with Davis Tutt became the quintessential quick draw duel in US history.

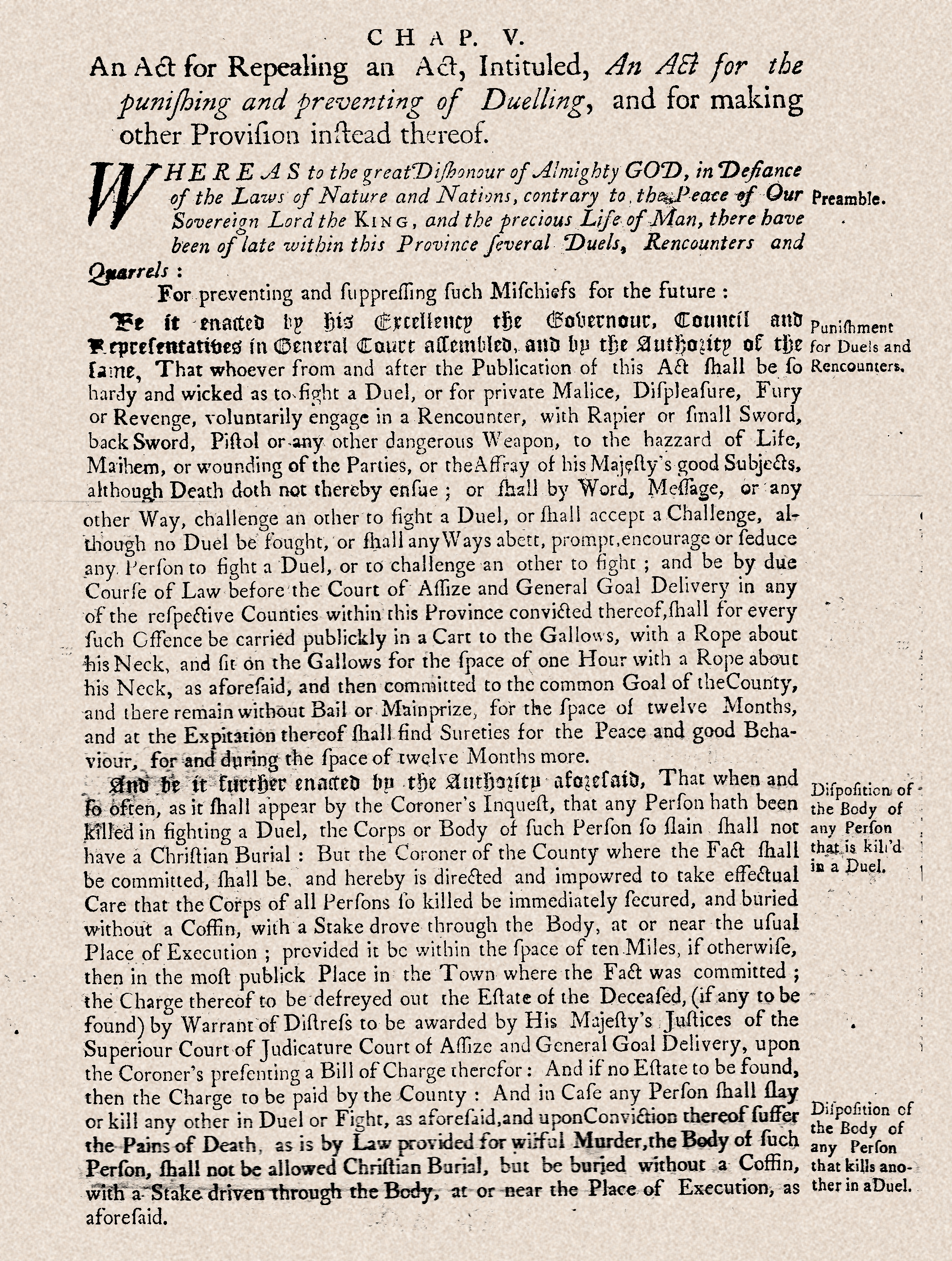
An Act for the punishing and preventing of Duelling (1728), Massachusetts Bay Colony

European styles of dueling established themselves in the colonies of European states in North America. Duels were to challenge someone over a woman or to defend one's honor. In the US, dueling tended to arise over political differences.

As early as 1728, some US states began to restrict or prohibit the practice. The penalty established upon conviction of killing another person in a duel in the Massachusetts Bay Colony in its 1728 law to punish and prevent dueling stated "In Case any Person shall slay or kill any other in Duel or Fight, as aforesaid and upon Conviction thereof suffer the Pains of Death, as is by Law provided for wilful Murder, the Body of such Person, shall not be allowed Christian Burial, but be buried without a Coffin, with a Stake driven Through the Body, at or near the Place of Execution, as aforesaid."

Dueling was the subject of an unsuccessful federal amendment to the United States Constitution in 1838. It was fairly common for politicians at that time in the United States to end disputes through duels, such as the Burr–Hamilton duel and the Jackson–Dickinson duel. While dueling had become outdated in the North since the early 19th century, this was not true of other regions of the nation.

Physician J. Marion Sims described the dueling culture in 1830s South Carolina:

In the South, teenage duels were not uncommon, particularly in South Carolina and New Orleans ... three ironies emerged from the dueling custom. First, though confined to a segment of the upper classes, dueling served essentially the same purpose as the lowest eye-gouging battle among Tennessee hog drivers. Second, because of this congruence between upper and lower concepts of honor, dueling was not at all undemocratic. It enabled lesser men to enter, however imperfectly, the ranks of leaders, and allowed followers to manipulate leaders to their taste. Third, the promise of esteem and status that beckoned men to the field of honor did not always match the expectation, but often enough dueling served as a form of scapegoating for unresolved personal problems.

However, as the 19th century progressed, the American definition of 'dueling' had clearly degenerated from an inherited European social custom using seconds and set rules of conduct. Instead, the term was increasingly used to describe any violent fight or melee between two or more contestants using mixed weapons – clubs, bottles, Bowie knives, or firearms of any type or description. Newspapers of the day freely used the term duel to include fights between combatants of any class or social order.

By 1859, 18 states had outlawed dueling outright, and with few exceptions, traditional dueling using seconds and formal rules of conduct had largely died out in the US by the 1870s. In Kentucky, the state constitution, enacted in 1891, mandates that anyone sworn into any statewide, county or city office, as well as attorneys who are members of the state bar, must declare under oath that he or she has not participated in, acted as a second or otherwise assisted in a duel.

Crude so-called 'quick-draw' duels, though in reality very rare, were also fought to uphold personal honor in the western American frontier, partly influenced by the code duello brought by Southern emigrants. The quick draw duel is a common trope in a gunfighter story in most Western stories, although some of the few real life Wild West duels that did occur included the Wild Bill Hickok – Davis Tutt shootout and Luke Short – Jim Courtright duel. Gunfighters Jim Levy and Tom Carberry became infamous for participating in at least two quick draw duels in their lifetimes. Besides quick draw duels, more formal European duels were also fought in the Old West such as those participated by former cowboys Hugh Anderson and Burton C. Mossman. Settlements such as Tombstone and Dodge City attempted to prevent these so-called duels by prohibiting civilians from carrying firearms by local ordinance, with little success. Instead, conflicts were increasingly resolved by the formation of organized law enforcement and the institution of judicial process.

==== Canada ====
In Upper Canada, then a British colony, John Wilson killed Robert Lyon on June 13, 1833, in Perth. That incident is believed by some to have been the last fatal duel fought in Canada; it was certainly the last in what is now Ontario. However, several reliable sources state that the last fatal duel in what is now Canada occurred in Lower Canada (now Quebec) on May 22, 1838. The duelists were British officer Major Henry Warde and lawyer Robert Sweeney; Warde was wounded in that incident and subsequently died.

=== Australia ===
Australia had a history of dueling, with the last recorded one being in Sydney between Thomas Mitchell and Stuart Donaldson (later Premier of New South Wales) in 1851. Only Donaldson's hat was damaged.

In Van Diemen's Land (present-day Tasmania), there were several high-profile duels involving members of the legal fraternity in the first half of the 19th century.

== Eastern traditions ==
=== China ===
In China, traditions of dueling are lei tai (Traditional: 打擂臺; Simplified: 打擂台) and duilian (Traditional: 對練; Simplified: 对练).

=== India ===
Duels or niyuddha were held in ancient India (including modern-day Pakistan and Bangladesh) for various reasons. Many kshatriya considered it shameful to die in bed, and in their old age often arranged for a yuddha-dhan, literally meaning "combat charity". According to this practice when a warrior felt he did not have much time to live, he would go along with a few attendants and ask another king for a duel or a small scale battle. In this way he chooses his own time and manner of death and is assured that he will die fighting. Duels to the death were legal in some periods, and punishable by execution in others.

Ancient epics and texts like the Dharmashastra tell that duels took place under strict rules of conduct, and to violate them was both shameful and sinful. According to these rules, it was forbidden to injure or kill an opponent who has lost their weapon, who surrenders, or who has been knocked unconscious. The Manusmṛti tells that if a warrior's topknot comes loose during a duel, the opponent must give him time to bind his hair before continuing. Both duelists are required to wield the same weapon, and specific rules may have existed for each weapon. For example, the Mahabharata records that hitting below the waist is forbidden in mace duels. In one ancient form of dueling, two warriors wielded a knife in the right hand while their left hands were tied together.

The Portuguese traveler Duarte Barbosa tells that dueling was a common practice among the nobles of the Vijayanagara Empire, and it was the only legal manner in which "murder" could be committed. After fixing a day for the duel and getting permission from the king or minister, the duellists would arrive at the appointed field "with great pleasure". Duelists would wear no armor and were bare from the waist up. From the waist down they wore cotton cloth tightly round with many folds. The weapons used for dueling were swords, shields and daggers which the king would appoint them of equal length. Judges decided what rewards would be given to duelists; the winner may even acquire the loser's estate.

Duels in Manipur were first recorded in the Chainarol-Puya which details the ethics of dueling. When a fighter was challenged, the day for the bout would be fixed to allow for time to prepare the weapons. Allowing the opponent the first chance to fire an arrow or hurl a spear was considered particularly courageous. The duel itself was not necessarily to the death, and usually ended once first blood has been drawn. However, the victor was still expected to behead the loser. Either before the duel or before the beheading, the fighters would share the meals and wine prepared by their wives. If it had been so requested beforehand, the loser's body may be cremated. Heads were taken as trophies, as was custom among the headhunters of northeast India. Various taboos existed such as not killing an opponent who runs, begs or cries out of fear, or anyone who pleads for protection.

In medieval Kerala, duels known as ankam were fought between the Chekavar or Ankachekavar warriors trained in Kalaripayattu. These duels were conducted in order to settle disputes between nobles, chieftains or rulers. Each side used to engage warriors to fight for them in combat at a fixed location and time. Both nobles would be represented by a Chekavar. These duels were usually fought to death, and the ruler whose Chekavar survived was considered as the winner.

=== Indonesia ===
Weapons and rules for dueling in the Indonesian archipelago vary from one culture to another. In Madura, dueling is known as Carok and was typically practiced with the sickle or celurit. The Madurese people imbued their sickles with a khodam, a type of mythical spirit, by a way of prayer before engaging in a duel.

The traditional form of dueling among the Bugis-Makassar community was called sitobo lalang lipa in which the duellists fight in a sarong. The challenger stands with a loosened sarong around him and respectfully invites the other man to step into the sarong. The sarong itself is kept taut around both their waists. When both men are inside, an agreement to fight til death and thereafter shall be no hereditary grudge nor will any party be allowed to question the duel, shall be made. If both fighters agree, they then engage each other within the confined space of a single sarong. Unlike the more typical kris duel of Javanese and Malay culture, the Bugis-Makassar community instead wield badik, the local single-edge knife. Because avoiding injury is near-impossible even for the victor, this type of duel was considered a sign of extraordinary bravery, masculinity and the warrior mentality. Although true sitobo lalang lipa are no longer practiced, enactments of these duels are still performed at cultural shows today.

=== Japan ===
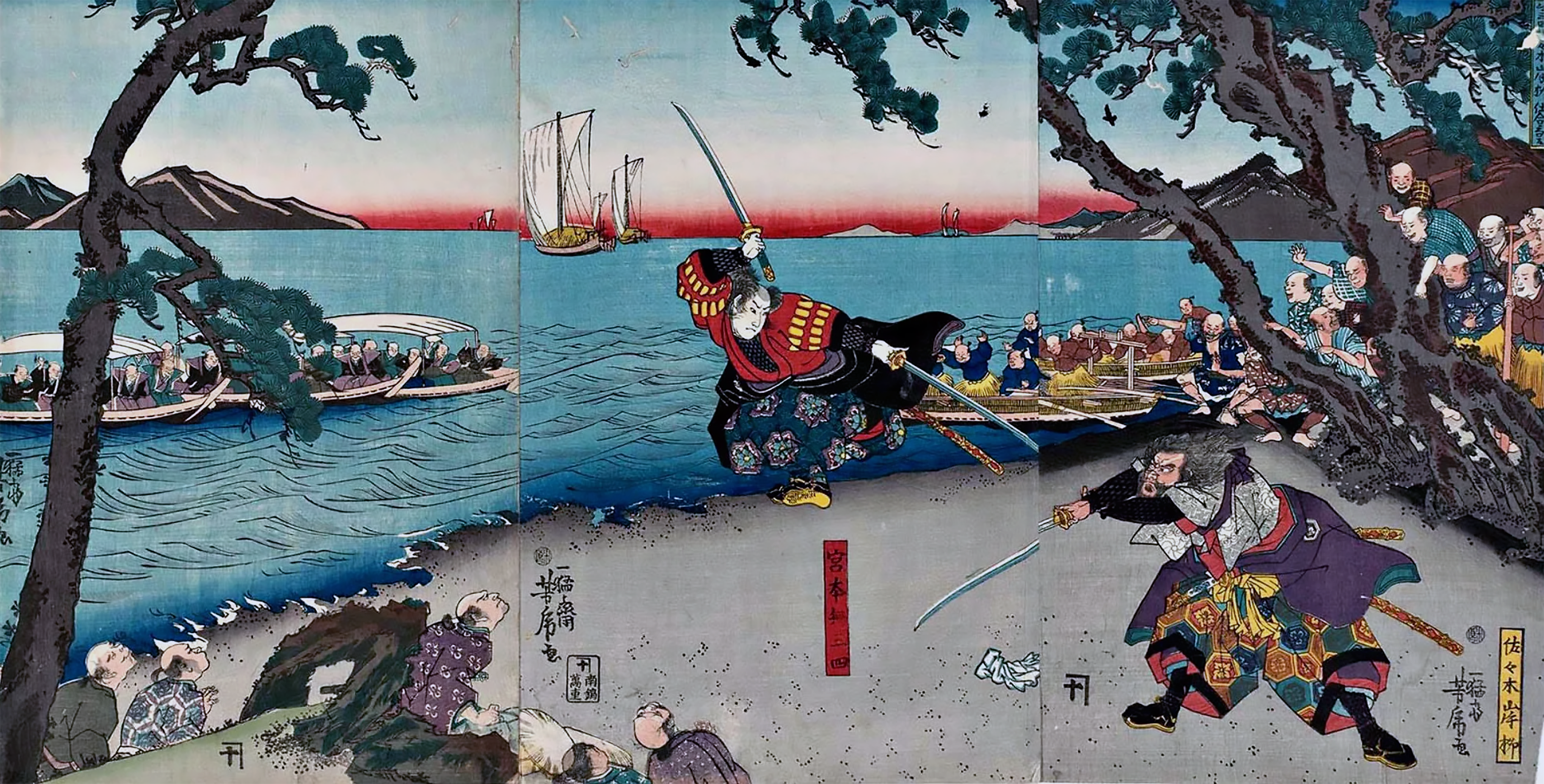
Depiction of the duel of Miyamoto Musashi vs. Sasaki Kojirō

In Edo period Japan, there was a tradition of dueling (kettō (決闘)) among the samurai class.

On April 14, 1612, the famous Japanese swordsman Miyamoto Musashi dueled his rival Sasaki Kojiro on the island of Funajima. Miyamoto is said to have fought over 60 duels and was never defeated.

=== Philippines ===
Dueling was a common practice in the Philippines since ancient times, and continued to be recorded during Spanish and American colonialism. In the Visayas, there is a tradition of dueling where the offended party would first hagit or challenge the offender. The offender would have the choice whether to accept or decline the challenge. In the past, choice of weapons was not limited. But most often, bolos, rattan canes, and knives were the preferred weapons. Duels were either first-blood, submission, or to the last man standing. Duels to death were known as huego-todo (without bounds). Some of the older generation of Filipino martial artists could still recall details of duels which occurred during their youth.

Duels with the bolo knife were prominent in North and Central Philippines, common in farmlands where the machete-like bolo is commonly used as a domestic tool. A duel reported internationally occurred on 14 April 1920 by Prescott Journal Miner which was known as "The First Bolo Duel in Manila since the American Occupation". It happened when Ángel Umali and Tranquilino Paglinawan met with friends in a vacant lot near the city centre before dusk to settle a feud; Paglinawan lost his left hand. With no law against bolo fights, Umali was charged for a petty crime.

Bolo fights are still seen today, albeit rarely, and have become part of Filipino rural culture. On 7 January 2012, two middle-aged farmers were wounded after a bolo duel over the harvest of rice in a village in Zamboanga City. Geronimo Álvarez and Jesús Guerrero were drinking and at the height of their arguing Álvarez allegedly pulled out his bolo and hacked Guerrero. Guerrero also pulled his bolo and repeatedly hacked Álvarez, and their relatives immediately intervened and rushed them to a hospital.

== See also ==
- List of duels
- Battle royal
- Blood sport
- Champion warfare
- Single combat
- Code duello, a set of rules for dueling
- Julie d'Aubigny (1673–1707), a French woman duelist
- Duelling pistol
- Gladiatorial combat
- Gunfighter, a popular stock character commonly placed in a gun duel or showdown
- Holmgang, a Scandinavian form of dueling
- Trial by combat, judicially sanctioned duel
- Truel, a duel with three participants
- Mutual combat
- Dueling scar
- Academic fencing
- Rapier, usually used in duelling
- Gaston Defferre

== Sources ==
- Baldick, Robert. The Duel: A History of Duelling. London: Chapman & Hall, 1965.
- Banks, Stephen. A Polite Exchange of Bullets; The Duel and the English Gentleman, 1750–1850 (Woodbridge: Boydell 2010)
- Banks, Stephen. "Very little law in the case: Contests of Honour and the Subversion of the English Criminal Courts, 1780-1845" (2008) 19(3) King's Law Journal 575–594.
- Banks, Stephen. "Dangerous Friends: The Second and the Later English Duel" (2009) 32 (1) Journal of Eighteenth Century Studies 87–106.
- Banks, Stephen. "Killing with Courtesy: The English Duelist, 1785-1845," (2008) 47 Journal of British Studies 528–558.
- Cramer, Clayton. Concealed Weapon Laws of the Early Republic: Dueling, Southern Violence, and Moral Reform
- Freeman, Joanne B. Affairs of Honor: National Politics in the New Republic (New Haven: Yale University Press, 2001; paperback ed., 2002)
- Freeman, Joanne B. "Dueling as Politics: Reinterpreting the Burr-Hamilton Duel." The William and Mary Quarterly, 3d series, 53 (April 1996): 289–318.
- Frevert, Ute. "Men of Honour: A Social and Cultural History of the Duel." trans. Anthony Williams Cambridge: Polity Press, 1995.
- Greenberg, Kenneth S. "The Nose, the Lie, and the Duel in the Antebellum South." American Historical Review 95 (February 1990): 57–73.
- Holland, Barbara. "Gentlemen's Blood: A History of Dueling" New York, NY. (2003)
- Hopton, Richard (2011). Pistols at Dawn: A History of Duelling. Little, Brown Book Group Limited. ISBN 978-0-7499-2996-1.
- Kelly, James. That Damn'd Thing Called Honour: Duelling in Ireland 1570–1860 (1995)
- Kevin McAleer. Dueling: The Cult of Honor in Fin-de-Siecle Germany (1994)
- Morgan, Cecilia (1995). "'In Search of the Phantom Misnamed Honour': Duelling in Upper Canada". Canadian Historical Review. 76 (4): 529–562. doi:10.3138/chr-076-04-01. S2CID 162014999.
- Rorabaugh, W. J. "The Political Duel in the Early Republic: Burr v. Hamilton." Journal of the Early Republic 15 (Spring 1995): 1–23.
- Schwartz, Warren F., Keith Baxter and David Ryan. "The Duel: Can these Gentlemen be Acting Efficiently?." The Journal of Legal Studies 13 (June 1984): 321–355.
- Steward, Dick. Duels and the Roots of Violence in Missouri (2000),
- Williams, Jack K. Dueling in the Old South: Vignettes of Social History (1980) (1999),
- Wyatt-Brown, Bertram. Honor and Violence in the Old South (1986)
- Wyatt-Brown, Bertram. Southern Honor: Ethics and Behavior in the Old South (1982),

=== Popular works ===
- Duels and Duelling (Stephen Banks) 2012.
- The Code of Honor; or, Rules for the Government of Principals and Seconds in Duelling, John Lyde Wilson 1838
- The Field of Honor Benjamin C. Truman. (1884); reissued as Duelling in America (1993).
- Savannah Duels & Duellists, Thomas Gamble (1923)
- Gentlemen, Swords and Pistols, Harnett C. Kane (1951)
- Pistols at Ten Paces: The Story of the Code of Honor in America, William Oliver Stevens (1940)
- The Duel: A History, Robert Baldick (1965, 1996)
- Dueling With the Sword and Pistol: 400 Years of One-on-One Combat, Paul Kirchner (2004)
- Duel, James Landale (2005). ISBN 1-84195-647-3. The story of the last fatal duel in Scotland
- Ritualized Violence Russian Style: The Duel in Russian Culture and Literature, Irina Reyfman (1999).
- A Polite Exchange of Bullets; The Duel and the English Gentleman, 1750–1850, Stephen Banks (2010)
