= Deadman Standing =

2018 film

- Directed by: Nicholas Barton
- Written by: Nicholas Barton; August Benassi
- Produced by: Nicholas Barton; Derin Dopps
- Starring: C. Thomas Howell; Quinn Lord; Viva Bianca; Luke Arnold; Richard Riehle; M. C. Gainey; Danny Winn
- Cinematography: James Kwan
- Edited by: Nicholas Barton
- Music by: Andrea Bellucci
- Production company: Prestigious Films
- Distributed by: Grindstone Entertainment Group
- Release date: December 11, 2018
- Running time: 92 minutes
- Country: United States
- Language: English

Deadman Standing (also known as Hyde Park) is a 2018 independent Western feature film written, edited and directed by Nicholas Barton and produced by Derin Dopps, who also acted as 1st AD. It is based on the true story of the gunfight at Hyde Park, in an area of South Central Kansas, presently occupied by Newton, KS.

== Plot ==
Told primarily via flashbacks, Rosie, a local brothel owner, meets a drifter, she proceeds to uncover her version of the events that transpired in Newton two years earlier.

== Cast ==
- C. Thomas Howell as The Stranger
- Quinn Lord as James Riley
- Viva Bianca as Rosie
- Luke Arnold as Mike McCluskie
- Richard Riehle as Clarence Potts
- M. C. Gainey as Hugh Anderson
- Danny Winn as Happy Jim
- Monique Candelaria as Lyla
- Aly Mang as Violet
- Luce Rains as Faro Fred
- Christopher Hagen as Heyoke Joe
- Douglas Bennett as Hugh Anderson Jr.
- Derin Dopps as Tall Ranch Hand

== Production ==
Hyde Park was filmed in 24 days in Santa Fe, NM and features a cast and crew of over 100.

The film was shot in 5K resolution using the RED Dragon Cameras. The film was later downscaled to a 4k - 4096x2048 resolution for final delivery.

Post-production was completed at Barton's home studio in the Dallas/Fort Worth Metro.

== Release ==
Hyde Park was released on December 11, 2018, by Lionsgate Entertainment, who changed the name of the film to Deadman Standing. It is available on all streaming platforms, with physical copies available at big box stores, on Amazon, and brought Red Box.
