= Code duello =

Set of rules for a one-on-one combat

A code duello is a set of rules for a one-on-one combat, or duel. Codes duello regulate dueling and thus help prevent vendettas between families and other social factions. They ensure that non-violent means of reaching agreement are exhausted and that harm is reduced, both by limiting the terms of engagement and by providing medical care. Finally, they ensure that the proceedings have a number of witnesses. The witnesses could assure grieving members of factions of the fairness of the duel, and could help provide testimony if legal authorities become involved.

== From the Roman Empire to Middle Ages ==
In Rome, the most famous duel was fought between three Horatii brothers and three Curiatii brothers, respecting precise rules during the 7th century BC. Marc Antony and Octavian also challenged each other to a duel which never came to fruition. The Lombards had dueling rituals too, often controlled by local judges. The Norse sagas give accounts of the rules of dueling in the Viking Age holmganga. The 1409 AD 'Flos Duellatorum' of Italy is the earliest example of an actual code duello in Europe. Fechtbücher of Hans Talhoffer and other fifteenth century masters give rules for judicial duels and "tournament rules", with varying degrees of detail.

== From the Renaissance to the 19th century ==
A morally acceptable duel would start with the challenger issuing a traditional, public, personal grievance, based on an insult, directly to the single person who offended the challenger.

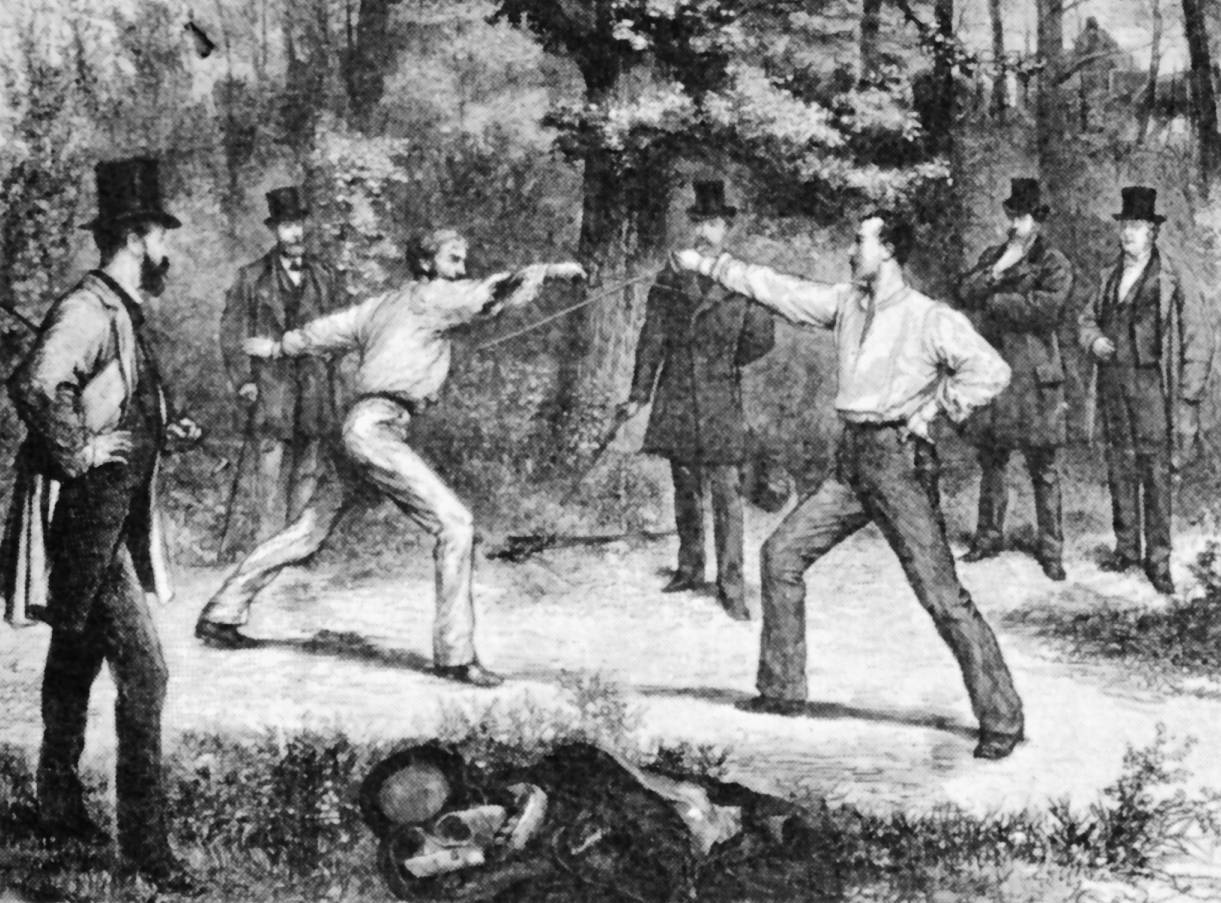
"The Code Of Honor – A Duel In The Bois De Boulogne, Near Paris" – 1874

The challenged person had the choice of a public apology or other restitution, or choosing the weapons for the duel. The challenger would then propose a place for the "field of honor". The challenged person had to either accept the site or propose an alternative. The location had to be a place where the opponents could duel without being arrested. It was common for the constables to set aside such places and times and spread the information, so that bystanders could avoid the location and stay out of harm's way.

At the field of honor, each side would bring at least one second – three was the traditional number – and a doctor. The seconds would try to reconcile the parties by acting as go-betweens to attempt to settle the dispute with an apology or restitution. If reconciliation succeeded, all parties considered the dispute to be honorably settled, and went home.

If one party failed to appear, he was considered to be a coward and the appearing party would win by default. The seconds (and sometimes the doctor) would bear witness to the cowardice. The resulting reputation for cowardice would often considerably affect the individual's standing in society, perhaps even extending to his family also.

The sword, with or without a companion weapon, was the customary dueling weapon until around 1800, by which time the custom of wearing the sword in civilian life had largely died out and the pistol had taken its place in both dueling and self-defense. Nevertheless, sword duels continued until the extinction of dueling itself.

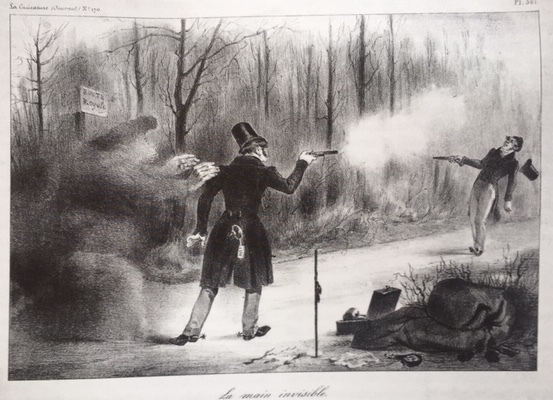
The Bugeaud-Dulon duel by Thomas Bouchet, 1834

When using swords, the two parties would start on opposite sides of a square twenty paces wide. Usually, the square was marked at the corners with dropped handkerchiefs. Leaving the square was accounted cowardice.

The opponents agreed to duel to an agreed condition. While many modern accounts dwell heavily on "first blood" as the condition, manuals of honour from the day universally deride the practice as dishonorable and unmanly. Far more common was a duel until either one party was physically unable to fight or the physician called a halt. While explicit or sustained duels "to the death" were in actuality rare, many duels nonetheless resulted in the death of one or both combatants, because of the wounds sustained and the limited capacities of doctors of the time to treat such wounds effectively; it was not uncommon for wounded participants to succumb to infection later.

When the condition was achieved, the matter was considered settled with the winner proving their point and the loser keeping their reputation for courage.

== Marquess of Queensberry ==
Just a few years after it was promulgated, many people wrote rather forcefully that the Irish Code was too deadly for the necessary business of discovering social positions among the military gentry. Those objecting to the 'Code Duello' included Benjamin Franklin and Queen Victoria, in whose day and realm the duel was already nearly extinct.

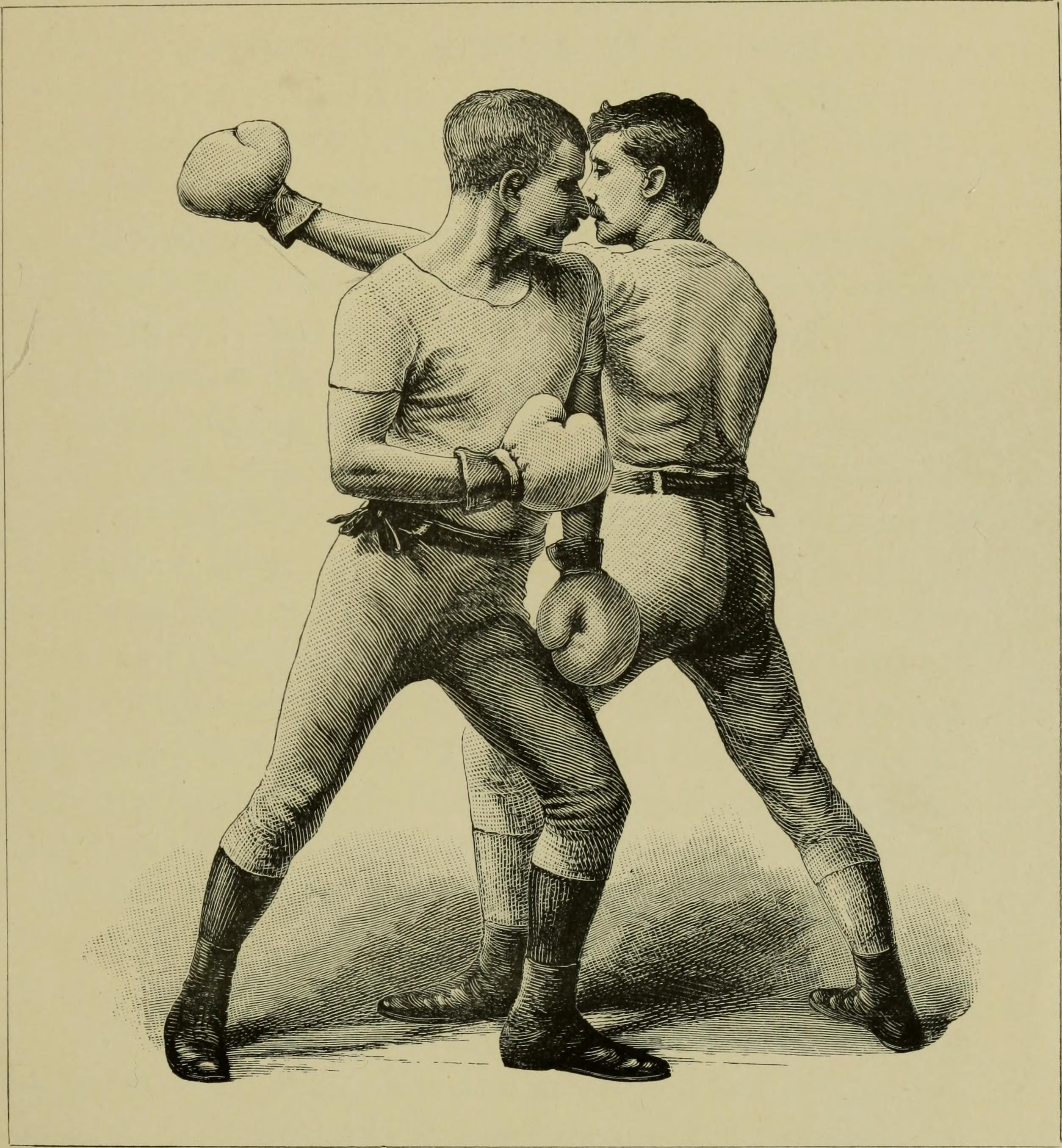
Men dressed for Marquess of Queensberry duel circa 1890

Pugilism had been growing in popularity and technique in Venice since 12th century, and in England since 1615, when a London armsmaster began offering public lessons in fisticuffs to the gentry. After many years, and several attempts by other men to write acceptable rules, John Graham Chambers wrote the Marquess of Queensberry rules in 1865. They were published in 1867.

He intended them solely for amateur matches, a thinly veiled reference to bouts of fisticuffs between gentlemen. The authorities began to allow prize matches and amateur boxing under this new rule system when John Sholto Douglas, 9th Marquess of Queensberry, endorsed its use.

The new rules had a three-minute limit on rounds, required gloves, and forbade grappling and wrestling. The rules prevented permanent mutilation: they did not permit punches to the temples, neck or below the belt. They also forbade kicking, biting and eye gouging.

The result was a visceral fight with less actual hazard than either a sword or gunfight. In other words, it became a nearly perfect vehicle for addressing matters of pride and insult.

As a practical matter, the legal sport of pugilism replaced dueling for most English gentlemen near this time. Only the involved gentlemen ever needed to know the points of honor at stake.

Dueling thereby moved underground and to 'sport' and has stayed there.

== Southern U.S. code of honor ==
Southern duels persisted through the 1840s even after dueling in the United States was outlawed. Commonly held on sand bars in rivers where jurisdiction was unclear, they were rarely prosecuted. States such as South Carolina, Tennessee, Texas, Louisiana and others had their own dueling customs and traditions. Most duels occurred between adult members of the upper classes, but teenage duels and those in the middle-classes also existed. Duels offered the promise of esteem and status, and they also served as a form of scapegoating for unresolved personal problems.

=== Western U.S. code duello ===
The stereotypical quick draw duel seen in many Western films were, in part, from the traditional code duello of the South brought by Southern emigrants. Duels in the Old West were fought for personal honor, though the quick-draw duels of popular legend were in actuality rare. Typical Western duels were a crude form of Southern code duello; they were formalized means of solving disputes between gentlemen, with swords or guns, that had their origins in European chivalry. The first known quick-draw duel was conducted by a Southern man named Davis Tutt against Wild Bill Hickok on July 21, 1865. Other more formal duels, like those typical in Europe, were also fought, like the Anderson–McCluskie duel.

== See also ==
- Trial by combat
- Burr–Hamilton duel
