= Mike McCluskie =

Mike McCluskie (?-1871) was a little-known gambler and occasional lawman from Ohio, who was the instigator of the Gunfight at Hide Park, which took place on August 19, 1871, in Newton, Kansas.

McCluskie was well known in Newton prior to the gunfight. Earlier that same year, he had been charged with garroting a man to death. Those charges were dismissed. Born and raised in Ohio, he made his way down into Kansas by way of employment with the Santa Fe Railroad, as a Night Policeman. He became the unofficial guardian of a young teenage man named James Riley, who was often seen in his presence, and who would eventually become the deciding factor in the gunfight.

== The gunfight ==
The incident began with an argument between local lawman, Billy Bailey, and McCluskie, who had been employed as a policeman for the elections. The two men began arguing on August 11, 1871, over local politics on election day in the "Red Front Saloon", located in downtown Newton. The argument developed into a fist fight, with Bailey being knocked outside the saloon and into the street. McCluskie followed, drawing his pistol. He fired two shots at Bailey, hitting him with the second shot in the chest. Bailey died the next day, on August 12, 1871. McCluskie fled town to avoid arrest, but was only away for a few days before returning, after receiving information that the shooting would most likely be deemed self defense, despite the fact that Bailey never produced a weapon. McCluskie had claimed he feared for his life, having known that in three previous gunfights, Bailey had killed two men.

Bailey, a native of Texas, had several cowboy friends who were in town. Upon hearing of his death, they vowed revenge against McCluskie. On August 19, 1871, McCluskie entered Newton and went to gamble at "Tuttles Dance Hall", located in an area of town called Hide Park. He was accompanied by a friend, Jim Martin. As McCluskie settled into gambling, three cowboys entered the saloon. They were Billy Garrett, Henry Kearnes, and Jim Wilkerson, all friends to Bailey. Billy Garrett had been in at least two prior gunfights, killing two men.

Hugh Anderson, the son of a wealthy Bell County, Texas cattle rancher, also entered, and approached McCluskie, calling him a coward and threatening his life. Jim Martin jumped up and attempted to stop a fight from occurring.

Anderson shot McCluskie in the neck, knocking him to the floor. McCluskie attempted to shoot Anderson, but his pistol misfired. Anderson then stood over him and shot him several times in the back. Kearns, Garrett, and Wilkerson also began firing, perhaps to keep the crowd back, and may have shot McCluskie in the leg.

At that point James Riley, believed to have been 18 years of age at the time, opened fire on them. Riley was dying from tuberculosis, and had been taken in by McCluskie shortly after arriving in Newton. Riley had never been involved in a gunfight before, but only Anderson still had a loaded pistol to return fire. Some accounts say Riley locked the saloon doors before shooting, but this seems unlikely. The room was filled with smoke from all the prior gunfire, and visibility was bad. Riley ended up hitting seven men.

Jim Martin, the would-be peacemaker, was shot in the neck and later died of his wound. Garrett, Kearns, and a bystander named Patrick Lee were also mortally wounded. Anderson, Wilkerson, and another bystander were wounded but survived. With both guns empty and all his opponents down, Riley walked away and was never seen again.

A warrant was issued for Anderson for killing McCluskie. He left Kansas by train and settled in Texas to recover from his wounds. On July 4, 1873, McCluskie's brother, Arthur McCluskie, located Anderson. A brutal fight ensued with both men shooting each other several times, then going after each other with knives. Neither survived.

Riley has been listed as a gunfighter in some historical accounts. He was mentioned in The Gunfighter-Man or Myth, by Joseph G. Rosa. However, there are no indications that he was ever in any other gunfights short of this one. Legend has it he left the area and began a new life elsewhere. However, due to his ill physical state, it is more likely he died not long afterward under an assumed name. Either way, he disappeared from historical record.
