= James Riley (gunman) =

Participant in the Gunfight at Hide Park

Kinch 'James' Riley (c. 1853 – ?) was a young man from Kansas who, on August 19, 1871 was the deciding factor in a little-known but deadly gunfight, which became known as the Gunfight at Hide Park, that took place in Newton, Kansas. The gunfight, despite being lesser known than either the Gunfight at the O.K. Corral or the Four Dead in Five Seconds Gunfight, resulted in more dead.

== Identity and origins ==
Where Kinch 'James' Riley came from is unknown. It is believed that he was born in Kansas, but as to where in Kansas is unknown. He first surfaced in Newton around 1869. He was thought to be suffering from tuberculosis, and was a loner. Mike McCluskie, a local gambler from Ohio and sometime lawman, took him in. Riley was often seen in the presence of McCluskie, but otherwise went unnoticed, and was never known to have been in any trouble. He wore a pair of twin Colt revolvers at all times, which McCluskie had taught him to use.

== The gunfight ==
The incident began with an argument between Billy Bailey and McCluskie, both of whom had been hired as policemen during the elections. The two men began arguing on August 11, 1871, over local politics on election day in the "Red Front Saloon", located in downtown Newton. The argument developed into a fist fight, with Bailey being knocked outside the saloon and into the street. McCluskie followed, drawing his pistol. He fired two shots at Bailey, hitting him with the second shot in the chest. Bailey died the next day, on August 12, 1871. McCluskie fled town to avoid arrest, but was only away for a few days before returning, after receiving information that the shooting would most likely be deemed self-defense, despite the fact that Bailey never produced a weapon. McCluskie had claimed he feared for his life, having known that in three previous gunfights, Bailey had killed two men.

Bailey, a native of Texas, had several cowboy friends who were in town. Upon hearing of his death, they vowed revenge against McCluskie. On August 19, 1871, McCluskie entered Newton and went to gamble at "Tuttles Dance Hall", located in an area of town called Hide Park. He was accompanied by a friend, Jim Martin. As McCluskie settled into gambling, three cowboys entered the saloon. They were Billy Garrett, Henry Kearnes, and Jim Wilkerson, all friends to Bailey. Billy Garrett had been in at least two prior gunfights, killing two men.

Hugh Anderson, the son of a wealthy Bell County, Texas cattle rancher, also entered, and approached McCluskie, calling him a coward and threatening his life. Jim Martin jumped up and attempted to stop a fight from occurring.

Anderson shot McCluskie in the neck, knocking him to the floor. McCluskie attempted to shoot Anderson, but his pistol misfired. Anderson then stood over him and shot him several times in the back. Kearns, Garrett, and Wilkerson also began firing, perhaps to keep the crowd back, and may have shot McCluskie in the leg.

At that point James Riley, believed to have been 18 years of age at the time, opened fire on them. Riley was thought to be dying from tuberculosis (this is not a fact), and had been taken in by McCluskie shortly after arriving in Newton. Riley had never been involved in a gunfight before, but only Anderson still had a loaded pistol to return fire. Some accounts say Riley locked the saloon doors before shooting, but this seems unlikely. The room was filled with smoke from all the prior gunfire, and visibility was bad. Riley ended up hitting seven men.

Jim Martin, the would-be peacemaker, was shot in the neck and later died of his wound. Garrett, Kearns, and a bystander named Patrick Lee were also mortally wounded. Anderson, Wilkerson, and another bystander were wounded but survived. With both guns empty and all his opponents down, Riley walked away and was never seen again.

A warrant was issued for Anderson for killing McCluskie. He left Kansas by train and settled in Texas to recover from his wounds. One newspaper reported that on July 4, 1873, McCluskie's brother, Arthur McCluskie, located Anderson, and a brutal fight ensued with both men shooting each other several times, then going after each other with knives.

Riley has been listed as a gunfighter in some historical accounts. He was mentioned in The Gunfighter-Man or Myth, by Joseph G. Rosa. However, there are no indications that he was ever in any other gunfights short of this one. Some believe Riley died soon after from his poor health. But the legend has it that Riley was not dying. He was explained in writings from the time as being gaunt, emaciated, and scarecrow like, with no mention of a sickness causing these things. Now many jump to thinking he was dying because of those descriptions but he could have just been a thin, frail looking young man. It is said that he moved East across the Mississippi River where he settled at a plantation. Either way, he disappeared from historical record.
