= 17th Precinct =

Fantasy police procedural TV series

- Genre: Fantasy; Police procedural
- Created by: Ronald D. Moore
- Starring: Jamie Bamber; James Callis; Tricia Helfer; Eamonn Walker; Esai Morales; Stockard Channing; Matt Long; Kristin Kreuk
- No. of episodes: 1

Production
- Production location: Vancouver
- Running time: 44 minutes
- Production company: Sony Pictures Television

Original release
- Release: 2011

17th Precinct is a police procedural television program created by Ronald D. Moore.

In a modern world where magic supplanted science, the unaired pilot featured two non-intersecting stories: the death of a city executive at the hands of a wrongful convict, and the introduction of terrorists who are devoted to the destruction of magic.

Moore developed the series with Sony Pictures Television for NBCUniversal, bringing with him several of the stars of his reimagined Battlestar Galactica franchise as cast.

The series was pitched in September 2010, the pilot was ordered January 2011, NBC passed on the series in May 2011, and the unaired pilot was leaked in December 2011. Reviewers mostly liked 17th Precinct, commenting on its innovativeness despite its police procedural roots.

== Plot ==
The series takes place in the American city of Excelsior (shot in Vancouver, modeled on San Francisco), in a world where science was never "invented", and instead of using "oil, electricity, [and] coal", mankind relies on plant- and fire-powered magic to run society. The police of Excelsior's 17th Precinct use spells to collect evidence and information, they defend themselves with "magic discs", and they psychically access "the stream" (a smokey light beam) for information, printouts, and newspapers.

=== Unaired pilot ===
Donald Pynchon, Excelsior's executive prophet (a city government official concerned with making and interpreting city-wide prophesies), is murdered in a North Beach back alley on September 23, 2011. Detectives Longstreet and Bosson (Bamber & Callis) are tasked with the case and determine that his murder was intentionally brutal, and it was unobserved due to a magical charm which deadened sound in the alley. It turns out that fifteen years previously, Pynchon was in Mendocino, California when, relying on a prophetic vision, testified against Lionel Dixon on charges of rape and murder. Dixon received a life sentence of magically reliving his victim's final experiences. After Dixon was acquitted thirteen years later, he was magically given a new life as a child (Quinn Lord) in an effort to make up for the mistaken identity; Dixon instead was driven to murder both Pynchon and the acquitting judge.

Unconnected with the Pynchon case, DCI Wilder Blanks (Walker) begins seeing visions related to the Stoics, "a group dedicated to the destruction of magic" in favor of "reason, rationality, and [...] science"—a laughable prospect, but one about which they are deadly serious. Twelve years previously (1999), the Stoics committed a series of murders to further their cause, but have neither been seen nor heard from since. Blanks retrieves DS Mira Barkley (Channing) from her dissatisfying work in another precinct to help; Barkley was his partner during the previous Stoics case. Blanks partners Barkley with rookie detective Jimmy Travers (Long) due to the latter's potential as an intuitive savant. Investigating a nuisance case in an apartment building, Barkley and Travers unwittingly allow the Stoics access to murder an otherwise protected tenant, a college professor of "advanced magical engineering and biology with an emphasis on power plant design." In the dénouement, it is revealed that the Stoics use "mechanical, rather than 'true' magic" which nothing in their world can defend against; the professor was killed using the Stoics' means, something called a bullet.

== Production ==
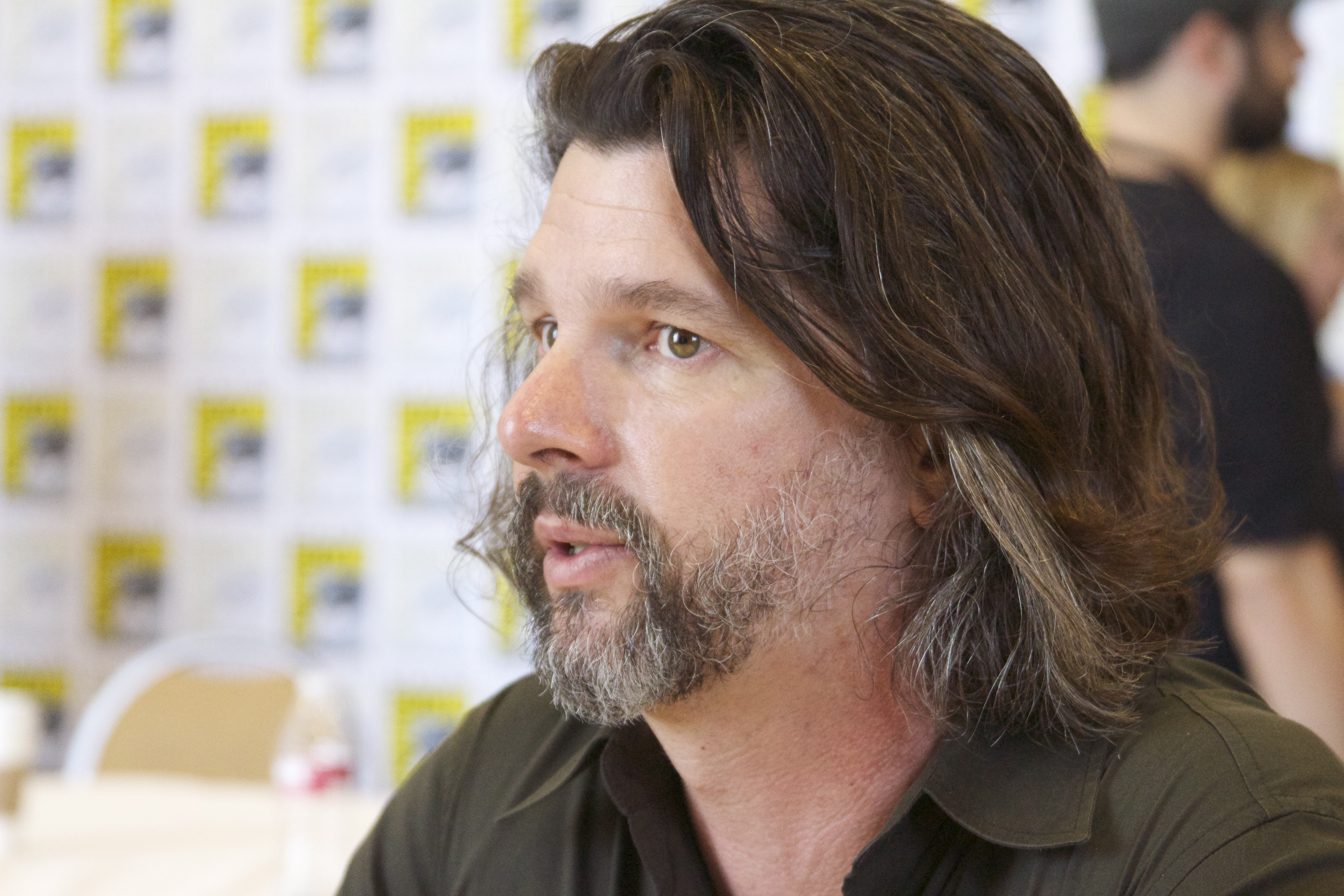
Ronald D. Moore (photographed in 2013) created 17th Precinct.

17th Precinct was created by Ronald D. Moore and produced by Sony Pictures Television. Moore's development of 17th Precinct was part of a two-year deal with Sony Pictures Television to "create and executive produce series projects for broadcast and cable through his production company Tall Ship Prods." When Moore pitched the show to NBCUniversal in September 2010, it carried a pilot and penalties price tag of US$2 million (equivalent to about $3M in 2025). In January 2011, NBC ordered a pilot from Moore and Sony.

== Cast ==
Moore brought several actors with whom he'd worked before into 17th Precinct, particularly from the reimagined Battlestar Galactica franchise.

- Jamie Bamber as Caolan Longstreet: A detective with the Excelsior Police Department (EX.P.D.), Longstreet is described as determined to succeed and be promoted; his skills allow him great forensic insight into a crime scene. Longstreet is married to Susan and has two children. Bamber foregoes his native British accent for an American one.
- James Callis as Jeff Bosson: Longstreet's partner on the EX.P.D., Bosson is the counterpart to Longstreet's straight man and family man persona. In pre-release information on the series, it was said that Bosson is keeping a "big secret" from his partner. Callis retains his native British accent for 17th Precinct.
- Tricia Helfer as Doctor Morgana Kurlansky: As the precinct's "public necromancer", Kurlansky communes with dead victims at crime scenes to gain their testimony, and coordinates with the police on other forensic evidence derived from the corpse. She has a personal relationship with DCI Blanks, which is not elaborated upon either in the leaked episode or the pre-release information.
- Eamonn Walker as Detective Chief Inspector Wilder Blanks: Blanks is chief inspector at the EX.P.D. 12 years prior to the series' time, he was partnered with DS Barkley during the Stoics' previous series of murders. As an "intuitive savant", Blanks experiences visions and feelings which have tangible connections to events.
- Esai Morales as Detective Inspector Liam Butterfield: Working at the EX.P.D., Butterfield has an antagonistic relationship with DS Barkley from her previous stint working in the Homicide Division. The character also was apparently a woman (Lisa) when last associated with Barkley, a change about which he is defensive when she needles him—"I'm not Lisa anymore, inside or out."; io9 described Butterfield as "[o]therwise, he's pretty much a total hard-ass."
- Stockard Channing as Detective Sergeant Mira Barkley: After dissatisfied years working in the Robbery Division, Barkley is brought back at the request of DCI Blanks because of her expertise from working the Stoics' murders in Alameda 12 years previously. She was partnered with Blanks when he was just a rookie.
- Matt Long as Detective James "Jimmy" Travers: As a rookie officer, Travers is partnered with Barkley because of his potential as an "intuitive savant".
- Kristin Kreuk as Susan: Longstreet's wife did not appear in the unaired pilot, but was said to run a declining antiques store and have a "huge dark secret."

== Release ==
On May 12, 2011, NBC announced that they had passed on 17th Precinct for their fall 2011 season of shows. NBC instead ordered a full season of another program featuring a supernatural angle on the traditional police procedural genre, Universal Television's Grimm.

The unnamed pilot episode of 17th Precinct was leaked online at Vimeo in the last days of December 2011.

== Reception ==
Charlie Jane Anders with the science-fiction blog io9 called Moore a "master of world-building", describing Excelsior as a richly described setting. They lauded its freshness in spite of its police procedural genre, saying that it was "bursting with new ideas" and "[r]ejuvenated a whole new genre". Airlock Alpha also commended 17th Precinct for incorporating a fresh take on the police procedural genre, though also felt the pilot introduced too many characters and concepts. TG Daily thought the concept was cool, though they felt "the execution could use a little polish". They also specifically lauded Bamber, Helfer, and Callis, while not being overly impressed by the supporting cast. In the end, they would have preferred 17th Precinct over Grimm.
