= Nicholas Barton (filmmaker) =

American filmmaker (born 1983)

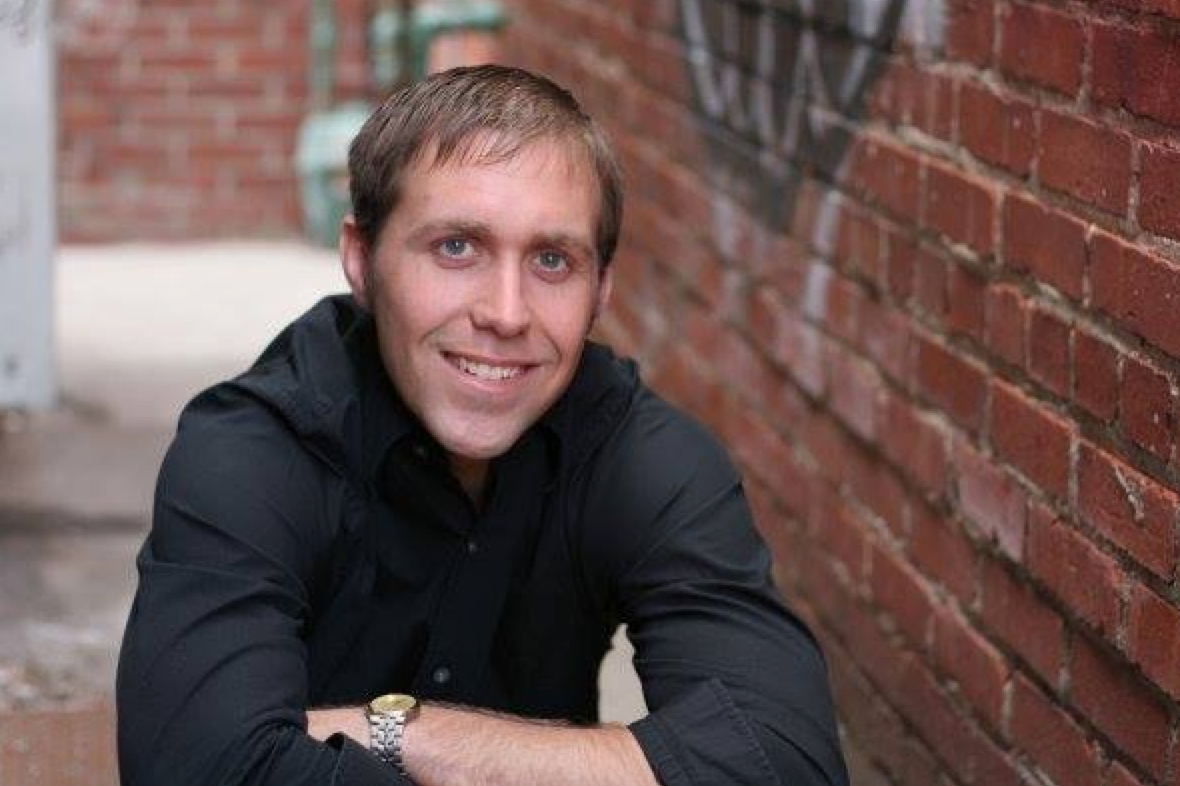
- Born: September 12, 1983 (age 43); Great Bend, Kansas
- Education: Kansas State University
- Occupation: Film director

Nicholas Dean Barton (born 12 November 1983) is an American film director, producer, screenwriter, editor, and cinematographer. He has written and directed feature films such as Death Alley, Hyde Park and Wichita. He also has created the series Zoos to You, Greensters, and Queens of Camo.

== Early life and family ==
Barton was born in Great Bend, Kansas on November 12, 1983, to Richard and Lisa Barton.

He was educated at the Kansas State University, where he studied philosophy with an emphasis in analytical philosophy and ethics. At the graduate school, he focused primarily on rhetoric and theatre.

In 2014, Barton moved to Los Angeles County, California, where he worked as a film editor for PopSugar and TV Guide Networks. During that time, he worked on promos for shows like The Biggest Loser, MasterChef, and handled all of their post-production for the food, fitness, beauty, as well as all branded content.

He has lived in Woodland Hills, CA located in the San Fernando Valley just north of Malibu.In 2017, he moved to Texas where he founded his production company and now lives in Bedford, Texas (a suburb of Dallas/Fort Worth).

== Career ==
Barton moved to Wichita, Kansas where, in 2009, he began his career in filmmaking as an associate producer for the Country Music Television series All Jacked Up starring C. Thomas Howell. From there, Barton created Prestigious Films and worked on several music videos and commercials.

As a television producer, he has worked on several television series including Hoarders, Extreme Couponing, Doomsday Preppers, HBO's Boxing After Dark, The Road to the Final Four, The Big Life with Kirstie Alley, My Crazy Obsession.

In 2014, Barton completed work on his first feature film Wichita, a western-thriller set along with the backdrop of the 1882 cattle drives. The film's budget was raised through commercial advertising projects that the crew did and was produced on an independent budget of $50,000. The film premiered at over 30 cinema theatres around the Midwest and has since been distributed to the US and global markets.

In 2017, his new film, Dead Man Standing, was released which is based on the true story of one of the most violent gunfights in the Wild West, Hyde Park. It tells the story of James Riley, a 19-year-old boy dying of tuberculosis. The film was acquired and released under the International Title of "Deadman Standing" by Grindstone Pictures, a division of Lionsgate Entertainment in late 2018. The film was shot at the historic Eaves Movie Ranch just outside of Santa Fe, New Mexico. The film ran for 94 minutes and starred C. Thomas Howell, Luke Arnold, Viva Bianca, M. C. Gainey, Quinn Lord, and Richard Riehle. Its Principal photography was done for 24 days and the post production was done at Barton's studio in metro Dallas–Fort Worth, Texas.

In March 2021, his third film, Death Alley, was released. It is loosely based on the true story of the Dalton Gang's Final Ride into Coffeyville, KS. It is loosely based on the true story of Dalton Gang who wanted to become the most famous outlaws in the United States, but that turned out to be a nightmare. The film was shot just prior to the COVID-19 pandemic in Kansas, Oklahoma and Missouri and was originally scheduled to be released in 2020. The film was produced in a studio located in Dallas/Fort Worth Metroplex.

Barton has also created Queens of Camo, a hunting television series that highlights the fastest growing hunting demographic in the world. With pro-staff in 12 different countries, known as Queens, the huntresses showcase outdoors adventures ranging from deer, turkey, wild pigs, waterfowl, and fishing. The show puts a spotlight on conservation work and the ethical way to treat and care for wildlife.
