= Quinn Lord =

Canadian actor (born 1999)

- Lord in 2026
- Born: Quinn Edmond Julian Lord; February 19, 1999 (age 27); Vancouver, British Columbia, Canada
- Occupation: Actor
- Years active: 2004–present

Quinn Edmond Julian Lord (born February 19, 1999) is a Canadian actor. Beginning his professional acting career at age five, Lord played Sam in the 2007 feature film Trick 'r Treat and was nominated for the Young Artist Award as Best Leading Young Actor in a Feature Film for his role as Thomas Whitman in the 2012 feature film Imaginaerum. He had a recurring role in Amazon's TV series The Man in the High Castle.

== Early life ==
Lord was born on February 19, 1999, in Vancouver, British Columbia, to a British mother and American father. He has an older brother and sister.

== Career ==
Lord began his career modeling for different TV commercials, including Kohl's in 2004, London Drugs in 2005 and Capital One in 2005.

His first television role was for Canadian miniseries Terminal City in which he played the role of Marmaduke. Some of Quinn's most notable work to date includes appearing in the dramatic feature film Things We Lost In The Fire as Cousin Joel alongside Oscar winners Halle Berry and Benicio Del Toro, and the Christmas comedy film Deck The Halls with Danny DeVito and Matthew Broderick. By age ten, Quinn has worked on the productions of Blade: The Series, The L Word, Stargate SG-1, and Supernatural. For his work on Smallville, he was nominated for a Young Artist Award in 2008 in the category of Best Performance for a Television Series.

Quinn's feature film debut was in the macabre horror anthology of four Halloween-related stories Trick 'r Treat whereas he portrayed the character of Sam, a mysterious trick-or-treater who wears a burlap sack with button eyes for a mask. Other film projects were 3-D film The Hole and Terry Gilliam's The Imaginarium of Doctor Parnassus. Both The Hole and The Imaginarium of Doctor Parnassus were given screenings at the 2009 Toronto International Film Festival.

In 2010, Quinn played the role of Robbie in the television film Second Chances directed by Jean-Claude Lord. On the same year, Quinn played Thomas in the drama film Daydream Nation directed by Michael Goldbach. Also the same year, Quinn played the role as Gabe Larson in the television film Mrs. Miracle 2: Miracle In Manhattan.

In 2011, Quinn appeared in a guest role of Tyler in the police procedural series Shattered. On the same year, Quinn appeared in the television film 17th Precinct as Leo Shetland.

In 2012, Quinn played the role of Dylan Chapman in the television film Virtual Lies directed by George Erschbamer. On the same year, Quinn played the role of Brendon Hughes in the thriller film In Their Skin opposite Selma Blair, Joshua Close, Rachel Miner and James D'Arcy. In the supernatural horror film The Possession starring Jeffrey Dean Morgan, Kyra Sedgwick, Natasha Calis, Grant Show, Madison Davenport, and Matisyahu, directed by Ole Bornedal. The same year, Quinn co-starred Marianne Farley in the fantasy film Imaginaerum as Thomas Whitman, age 10.

In 2014, Quinn appeared in the teen sex comedy film Date and Switch starring Nicholas Braun, Hunter Cope, Dakota Johnson, and Zach Cregger, in which he played the role as Michael, which was released on February 14, 2014.

From 2015 to 2019, Quinn played the recurring role of Thomas Smith in the dystopian alternate history series The Man in the High Castle.

In 2016, Quinn played the role of David in the television film Date with Love starring Shenae Grimes, Bailee Madison and Andrew Walker, directed by Ron Oliver, which was released on May 21, 2016.

In 2018, Quinn co-starred with C. Thomas Howell, Viva Bianca, Luke Arnold, Richard Riehle, M. C. Gainey and Danny Winn in the independent Western feature film Deadman Standing directed by Nicholas Barton, in which he played the role of James Riley.

In 2021, Quinn played the recurring role of Sean '74 in the drama streaming series Firefly Lane, based on the novel of the same name by Kristin Hannah.

On the same year, Quinn played one of the lead roles of Shawn Gunderson in the fantasy film Iké Boys alongside Ronak Gandhi and Christina Higa, in which was premiered at the Fantastic Fest on September 26, 2021, and was released on October 11, 2022.

== Filmography ==
=== Films ===
Year	Film	Role	Notes
2006	Deck the Halls	Santa Kid	Film debut
2007	White Noise: The Light	Henry Caine's Son	
2007	Trick 'r Treat	Sam/Peeping Tommy	
2007	Things We Lost in the Fire	Cousin Joel	
2008	Edison and Leo	Young Leonard "Leo" Edison	Voice
2008	Web of Desire	Sam Wyatt	Television film
2009	The Imaginarium of Doctor Parnassus	Nine-year-old son	
2009	Space Buddies	Pete	Direct-to-video
2009	Santa Buddies	Pete	Direct-to-video
2009	Virtuality	Shawn Braun	Television film
2009	The Hole	Annie Smith	
2010	Second Chances	Robert "Robbie"	
2010	Daydream Nation	Thomas	
2010	Mrs. Miracle 2: Miracle In Manhattan	Gabe Larson	Television film
2011	17th Precinct	Leo Shetland	Television film
2011	Afternoon Tea	Scott	Short film
2011	Last Christmas	Josh	Short film
2012	Imaginaerum	Tom, age 10	
2012	The Possession	Student	
2012	In Their Skin	Brendon	
2012	Virtual Lies	Dylan Chapman	Television film
2014	Date and Switch	Michael, age 8	
2016	Date with Love	David	Television film
2018	Deadman Standing	James Riley	
2021	Iké Boys	Shawn Gunderson	

=== Television ===
Year	Television Series	Role	Notes
2004	ToddWorld	Hardy the Hippo	Voice, episode: "Whatever Sways Your Swing"
2005	Terminal City	Marmaduke	Episode: "Pilot"
2005	Reunion	Liam	Episode: "1990"
2006	The L Word	Roland	Episode: "Lost Weekend"
2006	Blade: The Series	Young Zachary "Zach" Starr	Episode: "Pilot"
2006	Stargate SG-1	Child	Episode: "The Quest: Part 1"
2006	Supernatural	Evan	Episode: "Everyone Loves a Clown"
2007	Masters of Horror	Tobias "Toby"	Episode: "We All Scream for Ice Cream"
2007	Smallville	Phillipe Lamont	2 episodes
2007	Sabbatical	Daniel "Danny" Marlow	"Pilot", Only episode aired
2007	3-2-1 Penguins!	Jason Conrad	Voice, 20 episodes
2008	Peanuts Motion Comics	Linus van Pelt	Main role
2010	Shattered	Tyler "Ty"	Unaired pilot
2010	Fringe	Young Peter Bishop	Episode: "Peter"
2010	Hiccups	Young Boy	Episode: "Millie, Meet Stan"
2011–2012	R.L. Stine's The Haunting Hour	Jack and Bobby	2 episodes
2011	Eureka	Young Zane Donovan	Episode: "This One Time at Space Camp..."
2011	Endgame	Colin Davis	Episode: "Fearful Symmetry"
2011	Captain Starship	Kevin	
2012	Once Upon a Time	Hansel/Nicholas Zimmer	Episode: "True North"
2013	Arctic Air	Andy	Episode: "Wildfire"
2014	The 100	Young 100 Member	Episode: "His Sister's Keeper"
2015–2019	The Man in the High Castle	Thomas Smith	Recurring role
2021	Firefly Lane	Sean '74	Recurring role

=== Commercials ===
- Kohl's (2004)
- London Drugs (2005)
- Capital One (2005)

== Awards and nominations ==
Year	Award	Category	Nominated work	Result
2008	Young Artist Award	Best Performance in a TV Series - Guest Starring Young Actor	Smallville	Nominated
2011	Young Artist Award	Best Performance in a TV Series - Guest Starring Young Actor Ten and Under	Fringe	Nominated
2012	Leo Awards	Best Male Performance in a Short Drama	Last Christmas	Nominated
2012	Leo Awards	Best Lead Performance by a Male in a Short Drama	Last Christmas	Nominated
2013	Young Artist Award	Best Performance in a Feature Film – Leading Young Actor	Imaginaerum	Nominated
2013	Young Artist Award	Best Performance in a TV Series – Guest Starring Young Actor 11–13	Once Upon a Time	Nominated
2016	Young Artist Award	Best Performance in a TV Series – Recurring Young Actor (14–21)	The Man in the High Castle	Nominated
2016	Young Entertainer Awards	Best Recurring Young Actor 14-21 - Television Series	The Man in the High Castle	Won
