= Iké Boys =

- Film poster by Bob Eggleton
- Directed by: Eric McEver
- Written by: Eric McEver; Jeff Hammer
- Story by: Eric McEver
- Produced by: Jeff Hammer; Brion Hambel; Paul Jensen
- Starring: Quinn Lord; Ronak Gandhi; Christina Higa; Billy Zane; Yumiko Shaku; Ben Browder
- Cinematography: Ed Wu
- Music by: Rob Tunstall
- Distributed by: Shout! Factory
- Release date: September 26, 2021 (Fantastic Fest)
- Running time: 88 minutes
- Country: United States
- Languages: English; Japanese

Iké Boys is a 2021 American mixed media fantasy film directed by Eric McEver and starring Quinn Lord, Ronak Gandhi, and Christina Higa as three teenagers who acquire superpowers from a magical anime film. Billy Zane, Yumiko Shaku, and Ben Browder are featured in supporting roles.

== Plot ==
Best friends Shawn Gunderson and Vikram ‘Vik’ Kapoor escape from the drudgery of high school life in Oklahoma through their obsession with all things Japanese. When a mysterious anime film transforms them into its superhuman characters, they at first think that their wildest fantasies have come true. But when ancient monsters threaten to unleash the apocalypse on New Year's Eve of 1999, Shawn and Vik must look to each other to become the heroes they were always meant to be. Joining their adventure is Miki, a Japanese exchange student whose determination to go on a Native American vision quest puts her on a collision course with both Shawn and Vik and their foes... and whose destiny may determine the fate of the world.

== Cast ==
- Quinn Lord as Shawn Gunderson
- Ronak Gandhi as Vikram "Vik" Kapoor
- Christina Higa as Miki Shimizu
- Billy Zane as Newt Grafstrom
- Yumiko Shaku as Reiko Grafstrom
- Ben Browder as Wayne Gunderson
- Gary England as Weatherman
- Saylor Curda as Bethany

== Production ==
Production took place in Oklahoma at the beginning of 2020, with postproduction conducted during the COVID-19 pandemic. The original 2D animation was produced by teams in France and Taiwan, paying stylistic homage to Japanese anime of the 1980s and 1990s. The climactic battle was produced by a team of Japanese tokusatsu veterans, with explosives detonated using the same pyrotechnics rig as in Godzilla.

== Release ==
The film premiered at the Fantastic Fest on September 26, 2021. It had its international premiere at the Bucheon International Fantastic Film Festival on July 7, 2022. It also screened at the 2022 Boston Science Fiction Film Festival, where it won the award for Best Editing, the 2022 Phoenix Film Festival, and the 2022 Yubari International Fantastic Film Festival. Shout! Studios acquired the North American rights to the film, which was released on October 11, 2022.

Since its release the film has been featured at a variety of fan events, including San Diego Comic-Con, Otakon, G-Fest, and Anime Boston.

=== Reception ===
The film received positive reviews. On the review aggregator website Rotten Tomatoes, 100% of 11 critics' reviews are positive, with an average rating of 7.10/10. Robert Daniels of The New York Times wrote that, "What “Iké Boys” lacks in budget, it makes up for in ingenuity and spirit... when the big emotional beats arrive, this tight, emotive cast delivers the theme of being yourself no matter what, with aplomb." Harris Dang of In Their Own League called the film "a charming, entertaining and goofy trifle that honours its inspirations with love and respect while providing a warm story about will resonate with young audiences about passion, adventure and friendship." Amelia Emberwing of Slash Film gave the film a positive review and wrote, "The earnest nature of the film is both its greatest strength and its greatest weakness. But I'll take dorky earnestness over cool glibness any day." Andrew Mack of Screen Anarchy also gave it a positive review and wrote, "The action is just a fun way to reward yourself for learning something other than how to land a proper hero stance off your living room couch."
