= Hyde Park, Georgia =

District in the US state of Georgia

Hyde Park is a district in the American city of Augusta, Georgia, developed in the 1940s. Due to the low value of the land due to swamp, it was predominantly populated by African American sharecroppers from nearby rural areas. It was the subject of a $1.2 million United States Environmental Protection Agency (EPA) study of the air, groundwater, and soil in the area to determine the health risks from environmental contaminants. The area was divided into five neighborhoods with two of the five finding high levels of arsenic, chromium, and dioxins in the soil and groundwater. Significant levels of PCBs and lead were found in all five neighborhoods. Despite this, officials determined that the chemicals found in the area did not constitute great risk to health.

== Hyde and Aragon Park Improvement Committee (HAPIC) ==
A Hyde Park committee was created in 1968 to lobby for improved living conditions for the area.

This committee secured running water, paved streets, street lights, sewer lines, and drainage ditches for the area. As tests revealed the unsafe levels of chemicals flowing into the area from factories, such as the Southern Wood Piedmont, HAPIC began to focus more on environmental justice. A class action lawsuit filed by HAPIC against Southern Wood Piedmont led to multiple studies on the environmental and health impacts from chemical plants in the region. After the studies determined there was little health risk due to the chemicals, HAPIC activists filed a complaint with the EPA and noted the fallacies of the studies, such as the tests being conducted on dirt brought in from outside areas to cover the contaminated soil. Further investigation from HAPIC uncovered that the consulting firm used to conduct the studies had contracted with Southern Wood Piedmont in the past.

== 1993 Environmental Protection Agency Contamination Study ==
Hyde Park is located near a Georgia Power plant, an industrial ceramics factory, and the site of Southern Wood Piedmont, a wood preserving factory that was closed in 1988 when it was found to be leaking chemicals into the vicinity. In 1993, the Environmental Protection Agency (EPA) conducted a study to determine the degree of contamination in Hyde Park from several factories, which would then be used to determine if governmental aid was necessary to the Hyde Park residents.

Hyde Park residents reported various health conditions, such as asthma, lupus, arsenic keratosis, and developmental delays, all of which they attributed to toxic contamination. Due to rumors that the area was contaminated with factory chemicals and economic and social decline, Hyde Park residents found it difficult to sell their homes, insure their properties, and receive bank loans. Data from the EPA study led to a health consultation compiled by the Agency for Toxic Disease Registry (ATSDR). This consultation was meant to determine whether residents were at risk from environmental contaminants and to what degree. The results of the ASTDR risk assessment would then determine whether residents would receive governmental assistance or if they could take legal action.

The EPA testers took 93 soil samples and 14 groundwater samples. These samples were tested for chemicals that were then isolated, measured, and compared to EPA/ATSDR standards for toxicity. Most levels fell below the toxicity threshold. One area had an arsenic level of 59 mg/kg. The ATSDR has determined that a cancer risk exists at an arsenic level of 1.5 mg/kg, ingested per day. The final assessment concluded that there were not enough samples with levels in the hazardous range to represent a significant health risk.

=== Study Methodology ===
The EPA based its conclusions upon a typical four-stage risk assessment methodology. This methodology includes hazard assessment or identification; hazard characterization or dose-response analysis; exposure assessment; and risk characterization. Hazard identification determines whether a particular substance causes a disease or other adverse health effect, generally with a focus on one health effect at a time, referred to as an “endpoint.” Dose response analysis is done in a laboratory, primarily based on animal studies and then extrapolated to humans and performed at high doses and then extrapolated to low dose situations. Exposure assessments determine whether a chemical is harmful, the dose it is harmful, and whether community members are exposed to the chemical at that dose, typically focusing on a single chemical at a time.

=== Critiques of EPA Study ===
In a 2007 study, Melissa Checker argues that each of these phases of the EPA methodology can be biased or based on uncertain assumptions. The endpoints of hazard identification are determined by individuals, which may result in a failure to notice over harms. Cancer, which is easy to identify and represents a prominent public concern, is frequently chosen over other possible harms as an endpoint. Dose response is based on animals, although animals and humans can have very different reactions to chemicals. Due to costs, typically only a few hundred animals are used, making it difficult to spot adverse health effects as many chemicals often do not affect large percentages of a population. Additionally, many lab rodents are specifically bred to be genetically similar, unlike genetically and geographically diverse people. Most studies also extrapolate using the standard of a healthy white male worker.
