= Hyde Park (Osnabrück) =

Coordinates: 52.311225°N 8.015531°E

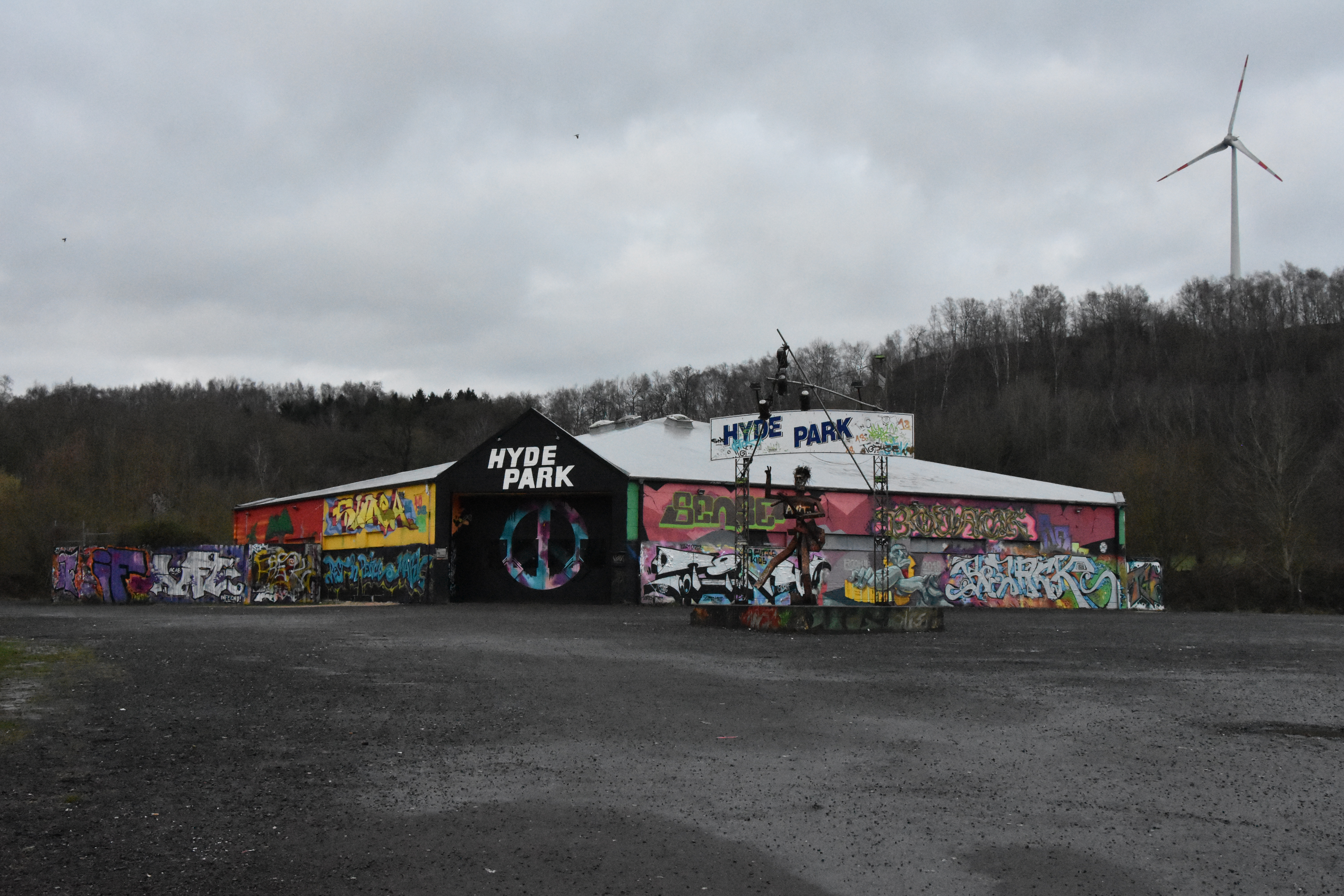
Hyde Park

Hyde Park is a live music venue located in Osnabrück, Germany. It opened in 1976 and has hosted artists such as Magnum, Hawkwind, Morbid Angel, Girlschool, Krokus and Yngwie Malmsteen. Due to noise complaints, the actual location of the venue has changed over the years.
