= René Ribière =

French politician

René Ribière (21 January 1922 – 25 December 1998) was a French Gaullist politician. He took part in the last ever duel in France in 1967 and lost when he was lightly injured by Gaston Defferre, after Defferre insulted Ribière at the French parliament. Defferre yelled ‘Taisez-vous, abruti!‘ (‘Shut up, stupid!’) at Ribière following an argument in the French National Assembly. Ribière demanded an apology, Defferre refused, so Ribière demanded satisfaction by duel with small swords. René Ribière lost the duel, having been wounded twice. He escaped relatively uninjured, however.
