= Hyde Park station =

Hyde Park station may refer to:

- Hyde Park station (Los Angeles Metro), in Los Angeles, California, United States
- Hyde Park station (MBTA), in Boston, Massachusetts, United States
- Hyde Park station (New York Central Railroad), in Hyde Park, New York, United States
- Hyde Park Corner tube station, in London, England
- 51st/53rd Street/Hyde Park station, in Chicago, Illinois, United States
