= Gunfight at Hide Park =

Old West gunfight

The Gunfight at Hide Park, or the Newton Massacre, was the name given to an Old West gunfight that occurred on August 19, 1871, in Newton, Kansas, United States. While well publicized at the time, the shootout has received little historical attention despite resulting in a higher body count than the Gunfight at the O.K. Corral and the Four Dead in Five Seconds Gunfight of 1881. Unlike most other well-known gunfights of the Old West, it involved no notable or well-known gunfighters, nor did it propel any of its participants into any degree of fame. The story has transformed into legend due to reports that one of the participants, James Riley, walked away from the scene and was never seen again.

Thirteen people were said to have been killed in the gunfight, nine of them by Riley.

== The gunfight ==
The incident began with an argument between two local lawmen, Billy Bailey and Mike McCluskie. On August 11, 1871, the two men began arguing over local politics on election day in the Red Front Saloon, located in downtown Newton. The argument developed into a fistfight, with Bailey being knocked outside the saloon and into the street. McCluskie followed, drawing his pistol. He fired two shots at Bailey, hitting him with the second shot in the chest. Bailey died the next day, August 12. McCluskie fled town to avoid arrest, but returned a few days later after receiving information that the shooting would likely be deemed self defense, despite the fact that Bailey never produced a weapon. McCluskie claimed he had feared for his life, having known that in three previous gunfights, Bailey had killed two men.

On August 19, 1871, McCluskie entered Newton to gamble at Tuttles Dance Hall, located in an area of town called Hide Park. He was accompanied by a friend, Jim Martin. As McCluskie was gambling, three cowboys entered the saloon. They were Billy Garrett, Henry Kearnes, and Jim Wilkerson, all friends of Bailey who had sworn revenge on McCluskie. Billy Garrett had been in at least two prior gunfights, killing two men.

Hugh Anderson, the son of a wealthy Bell County, Texas cattle rancher, also entered and approached McCluskie, calling him a coward and threatening his life. Jim Martin jumped up in an attempt to stop a fight from occurring. Anderson shot McCluskie in the neck, knocking him to the floor. McCluskie attempted to shoot Anderson, but his pistol misfired. Anderson stood over McCluskie and shot him several times in the back.

Kearns, Garrett, and Wilkerson also began firing and may have shot McCluskie in the leg. At that point a young man named James Riley, believed to have been around 18 years of age at the time, opened fire on the men.

Riley was dying from tuberculosis, and had been taken in by McCluskie shortly after arriving in Newton. Riley had never been involved in a gunfight before, but only Anderson still had a loaded pistol to return fire. Some accounts say Riley locked the saloon doors before shooting, but there is no evidence of this. Riley ended up shooting seven men due to limited visibility from the prior gunfire.

Jim Martin, the would-be peacemaker, was shot in the neck and later died of his wound. Garrett, Kearns, and a bystander named Patrick Lee were also mortally wounded. Anderson, Wilkerson, and another bystander were wounded but survived.

With both guns empty and all his opponents down, Riley walked away and was never seen again.

A warrant was issued for the arrest of Hugh Anderson for the murder of McCluskie. He fled Kansas for Texas to evade authorities and recover from his wounds.

Anderson was later confronted by Mike McCluskie's brother Arthur, who challenged him to a duel in revenge for his brother's death. The duel ended with both severely injured, Arthur McCluskie fatally.

== In popular culture ==
The gunfight inspired the western short film No Sunday West Of Newton, written by Gwendolyn Cameron, Hunter Gehman, and Spencer Cameron.

The 2019 album The Cowboy Iliad: A Legend Told in the Spoken Word written by Walter Hill and produced by Bobby Woods was inspired by the story.

The gunfight at Hide Park has also inspired the Spur Award-Winning Author Johnny D. Boggs of other western novels to write "Bloody Newton: The Town From Hell" from Kensington Publishing. The story combines the factual history of this fateful summer in 1871 and its characters with the fictional Hardee ranch family from Texas who have herded their cattle to the new railhead in Newton.

The Louis L’Amour novel, Flint, features a shootout that is inspired by the Hide Park Massacre, carried out by the title character, Jim Flint.
