= Hugh Anderson (cowboy) =

American cowboy and gunfighter

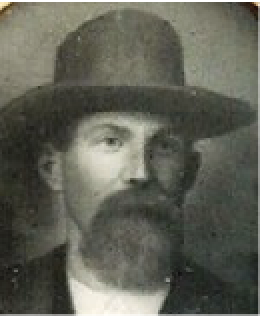
- Anderson c. 1875–1900s
- Born: November 25, 1851
- Died: August 19, 1873 or June 9, 1914

Hugh Anderson (November 25, 1851 – August 19, 1873 or June 9, 1914) was an American cowboy and gunfighter who participated in the infamous Gunfight at Hide Park on August 19, 1871, in Newton, Kansas.

Prior to the gunfight, Anderson was a son of a wealthy Bell County, Texas, cattle rancher who drove from Salado, Texas, to Newton, Texas. Anderson was the one who led the cowboy faction during the gunfight, and was also one of the first to draw blood.

The incident began with an argument between two local lawmen, Billy Bailey and Mike McCluskie. The two men began arguing on August 11, 1871, over local politics on election day in the "Red Front Saloon", located in downtown Newton. The argument developed into a fist fight, with Bailey being knocked outside the saloon and into the street. McCluskie followed, drawing his pistol. He fired two shots at Bailey, hitting him with the second shot in the chest. Bailey died the next day, on August 12, 1871. McCluskie fled town to avoid arrest, but was only away for a few days before returning, after receiving information that the shooting would most likely be deemed self defense, despite the fact that Bailey never produced a weapon. McCluskie had claimed he feared for his life, having known that in three previous gunfights, Bailey had killed two men.

== Murder of Mike McCluskie ==
Hugh Anderson led the Texans in vowing revenge for Bailey's death. On August 19, 1871, McCluskie entered Newton and went to gamble at "Tuttles Dance Hall", located in an area of town called Hide Park. He was accompanied by a friend, Jim Martin. As McCluskie settled into gambling, three cowboys entered the saloon. They were Billy Garrett, Henry Kearnes, and Jim Wilkerson, all friends to Bailey. Anderson arrived soon after.

Anderson confronted McCluskie and the two had a bitter exchange of words, before Anderson ended up shooting McCluskie in the neck and body. The latter tried to shoot back at Anderson, hitting him in the neck, but Anderson continued firing. After McCluskie's gun finally misfired, Anderson walked over him and shot him in the back several times. At that point James Riley, believed to have been 18 years of age at the time, opened fire on them. Riley was dying from tuberculosis, and had been taken in by McCluskie shortly after arriving in Newton. Riley had never been involved in a gunfight before, but only Anderson still had a loaded pistol to return fire. Some accounts say Riley locked the saloon doors before shooting, but this seems unlikely. The room was filled with smoke from all the prior gunfire, and visibility was bad. Riley ended up hitting seven men. More casualties soon followed between the patrons of the saloon.

Mike McCluskie died in the following morning, and an arrest warrant was issued for the wounded Hugh Anderson. But his friends managed to spirit him away back to Kansas City first then to Texas before the local law could get him.

== Duel with Arthur McCluskie ==
Anderson recovered from his wounds and by 1873 had become a bartender in Medicine Lodge, Kansas. Unknown to Anderson, the brother of Mike McCluskie, Arthur McCluskie, had been searching for him to avenge his brother, located him and challenged him to a duel. Anderson accepted the duel and was allowed to choose between pistols and knives; he chose pistols, and a formal duel was arranged. While it was different from the "quick draw duels" that became iconic in the West, the Anderson-McCluskie duel was also different from "traditional duels" because it depended more on speed and reaction time.

In late afternoon the two lined up as bystanders watched the confrontation. They stood with their backs to each other at twenty paces. At the sound of a signal (the gunshot from a pistol) the two quickly turned to each other and fired their weapons. Their initial shots missed but soon after Anderson hit McCluskie in the mouth and neck while the latter hit Anderson in the arm. More shots were fired and McCluskie managed to hit Anderson in the stomach. However, the first one to fall was McCluskie, after Anderson emptied his pistol into him. Unfortunately for Anderson, McCluskie's wounds were not fatal, and the two resumed their duel with knives. The second round saw Anderson and McCluskie repeatedly stabbing each other, and ultimately McCluskie fell for a second time, which ended the duel. He was rushed to a boarding house but died a day later. It was said that Anderson lived a short time longer before dying from his wounds as well. The duel was recorded in an article in the New York World on July 22, 1873.

Although some records said that Anderson died after his duel, there were also reports that he survived his ordeal and came back to live with his family. Three years later, Hugh was said to have moved with his young son and several other family members to McCullock, Texas, and the 1880 Federal Census listed Hugh, 28, and son, Oscar, 7, living with his parents and working as a "stock raiser" in McCullock County. In 1884, at age 32, Hugh married a second time, Mag Cooke and moved to Chaves County, New Mexico Territory, continuing his work as a stock man. The U.S. Census for 1900 listed Hugh as a widower. In 1910, Hugh is listed as a stock man and living with his married son, Oscar, and three grandsons. Hugh Anderson was listed to have died on June 9, 1914, at the age of 62 while herding cattle in Lincoln County, New Mexico, and getting struck by lightning.
