= The Unexpected Race =

2018 fantasy film

- Movie poster
- Directed by: Stephen Groo
- Produced by: Stephen Groo; Jared Harris; Scott Christopherson; Eric Robertson
- Starring: Jack Black; Jon Heder; Sariah Hopkin; Clint Pulver
- Cinematography: Lauren VanDerwerken
- Music by: Jason Adams
- Distributed by: Wolf Productions
- Release dates: September 14, 2018 (Sydney Underground Film Festival); July 18, 2019 (United States)
- Running time: 102 minutes
- Country: United States
- Language: English

The Unexpected Race is a 2018 American fantasy film starring Jack Black, Jon Heder and Clint Pulver. Unexpected Race was written, directed, and produced by Stephen Groo. It is a remake of Groo's 2003 film of the same name.

The film premiered at the 2018 Sydney Underground Film Festival. Jack Black was introduced to director Groo's films by Jared Hess, director of Napoleon Dynamite and Nacho Libre. Black, who had starred in Nacho Libre, became a huge fan of Groo's and volunteered to take part in Unexpected Race.

== Plot ==
A young woman named Amber is sent to live with her father, someone she hasn't seen since a car accident that took the life of her mother more than 10 years ago. Amber finds an elf named Lythorin hiding in the woods, trying to elude an FBI agent tasked to destroy all elves. Amber and Lythorin fall in love and the elf must decide if he wants to stay alone or be with Amber.

== Cast ==
- Jack Black as Sheriff
- Sariah Hopkin as Amber
- Ruel Brown as Father
- Clint Pulver as Lythorin
- Cherie Julander as Lylerine
- Crystal Hatfield as Zara
- Jon Heder as Harry
- Jared Hess as Deputy
- Adam Colvin as Deputy
- Stacylyn Bennett as Mother
- Eric Robertson as Special Forces
- Bob Richardson as Agent Hardman
- Brandon Arnold as Special Forces
- Micah Dahl Anderson as Special Forces
- James Alexander as FBI Agent
- Tyson Riskas as Agent Forest
