= Peluca =

2002 Short film by Jared Hess

- Directed by: Jared Hess
- Written by: Jared Hess
- Produced by: Jeremy Coon
- Starring: Jon Heder; Greg Hansen; Bracken Johnson; Chris Sanchez
- Music by: Burt Bacharach
- Release date: 2002
- Running time: 9 minutes
- Language: English
- Budget: $500

Peluca is a short film by director Jared Hess, produced for an assignment while attending Brigham Young University in 2002. It was shown at the 2003 Slamdance Film Festival.

The film is almost nine minutes long and was shot on black-and-white 16mm film. It stars Jon Heder as the main character, Seth. The film's title is the Spanish word for "wig", referring to the wig that is purchased in the film.

The short was later adapted into the 2004 film Napoleon Dynamite, which featured Heder as the title character. The short appears as a special feature on the DVD.

== Plot ==
Seth (Jon Heder) skips school with two of his friends, Pedro and Giel, to attempt to buy a lottery ticket at the convenience store and shop at a local thrift store, where they find a wig for Giel (who shaved his head after catching a fever). Later, they return to the school, and Seth leaves to go to a Future Farmers of America contest.

== Cast ==
- Jon Heder as Seth
- Greg Hansen as Pedro
- Chris Sanchez as Giel
- Bracken Johnson as Randy
- Leonard Shackelford as Store Clerk

== Production ==
Peluca was shot in black-and-white on 16mm film. It was filmed in locations around Hess' hometown of Preston, Idaho, including Preston High School, a local D.I. thrift store, and the La Tienda convenience store in nearby Franklin, Idaho. The film was completed in two days with a budget of under $500.

== Legacy ==
The Seth character was later adapted into the titular character of the 2004 feature film Napoleon Dynamite. Heder also played Napoleon.

The characters of Giel and Pedro are combined in Napoleon Dynamite as the character Pedro Sanchez.

Nearly all elements and locations from Peluca are used in the film (the convenience store scene was deleted from the final cut, however).
