= Napoleon Dynamite (TV series) =

2012 American animated television series

- Genre: Animated sitcom; Slapstick comedy; Satire
- Created by: Jared Hess; Jerusha Hess
- Based on: Napoleon Dynamite by Jared Hess
- Developed by: Jared Hess; Jerusha Hess; Mike Scully
- Voices of: Jon Heder; Aaron Ruell; Efren Ramirez; Tina Majorino; Sandy Martin; Jon Gries; Diedrich Bader
- Theme music composer: Alan Hawkshaw; Alan Parker
- Composers: Eric Speier; Alan Hawkshaw
- Country of origin: United States
- Original language: English
- No. of episodes: 6

Production
- Executive producers: Jared Hess; Jerusha Hess; Mike Scully; Jeremy Coon; Gregg Vanzo
- Producers: Tim Long; Claudia Katz; J. Michael Mendel; Sean Covel; Chris Wyatt; Laura Stupsker; Dan Vebber; Tom Gammill Max Pross; Julie Thacker-Scully; Elise Belknap; Geraldine Symon
- Editor: Lee Harting
- Running time: 22 minutes
- Production companies: Hess Films; Scully Productions; 20th Century Fox Television

Original release
- Network: Fox
- Release: January 15 – March 4, 2012

Napoleon Dynamite is an American animated satirical slapstick comedy television series created by Jared and Jerusha Hess for Fox, based on the 2004 film of the same name, which both Hesses co-wrote. Veteran television writer Mike Scully helped develop the series, while the original cast reprised their roles. Set in the small town of Preston, Idaho, it follows the adventures of the titular 16-year-old boy who thinks he is skilled at everything.

The series premiered on January 15, 2012, as part of the Animation Domination block on Fox. It earned polarizing reviews, with criticism aimed at the slow pacing and humor, while its faithfulness to the source material, voice acting, and animation earned the most praise. The series' premiere was seen by over 9.5 million viewers, but the ratings later dropped as the show progressed, with the last four episodes averaging 4 million viewers; it ranked sixth in viewership among teenagers according to the Nielsen Media Research.

On March 4, 2012, the series was cancelled after one season.

== History ==
Jared and Jerusha Hess, the co-writers of the 2004 film Napoleon Dynamite, had expressed interested in doing an animated version since the film's release, believing that animation was the best way to continue the world of Napoleon Dynamite as the original actors had grown too old to play teenage characters. Following the film's success, Fox Searchlight Pictures wanted a sequel, but the Hesses delayed due to commitments to other projects and fear that audiences would tire of the Napoleon Dynamite characters.

Development of the show began in 2009 when the Hesses met with writer-producer Mike Scully, who was a fan of the film, to propose an animated television series based on the film and the two presented a nine-minute pilot episode to Fox in 2010. That May, Fox officially confirmed that an animated television miniseries with the original cast was in development with close involvement from the Hesses. Fox placed an order for six episodes as a trial run, and ordered seven additional scripts in July 2011 to be put into production if it was renewed for a second season. The Hesses and Scully all served as showrunner.

The miniseries premiered on January 15, 2012, as a mid-season replacement for the animated television series Allen Gregory. During its six-episode run, Napoleon Dynamite had no consistent schedule; it was constantly shifted on the Fox schedule in favor of football and award shows. On May 15, 2012, Fox cancelled the series after one season.

== Premise ==
The series takes place towards the end of the Napoleon Dynamite film; Scully said they transferred the characters and premise, but not the events, of the film.

In the film, set in the small town of Preston, Idaho, Napoleon (Jon Heder) is an awkward 16-year-old boy who loves practicing ninja moves, dancing, and drawing pictures of a liger, an animal he says is bred for its skills in magic. He also invents stories about himself: hunting wolverines in Alaska, having an Oklahoman girlfriend, and that a gang wants him to join because of his skill with a bo staff. His brother Kip (Aaron Ruell) is an unemployed 32-year-old; flimsy and gawky, he is the target of Napoleon's outlashes, although he often brags of his wrestling abilities and overall coolness; he spends his days in an internet chat room talking to a woman named Lafawnduh. The two live with their grandmother, Carlinda (Sandy Martin), who enjoys riding all-terrain vehicles.

Deborah "Deb" Bradshaw (Tina Majorino) is a shy, quiet, sweet, and artistically inclined girl who is infatuated with Napoleon upon first meeting him. Napoleon's uncle Rico (Jon Gries) is a middle-aged man and former high-school athlete who lives in a camper van and is obsessed with his failed football career. He frequently performs get rich quick schemes, believing riches will help him get over his crushed dreams of NFL stardom. Rex Kwon Do (Diedrich Bader) is a self-declared martial-arts master who runs a dojo in town.

Napoleon also becomes friends with a Mexican exchange student named Pedro Sánchez (Efren Ramirez) who rarely conveys emotion or speaks. Pedro runs for class president after seeing a poster at the school dance. On the election day, he gives a mediocre speech in front of the student body. Napoleon does a dance routine as Pedro's skit for the election and receives a standing ovation, saving the campaign and winning Pedro the election. Two months later, Kip and Lafawnduh are married.

Jared Hess, who directed the film, stated that the series takes place after Pedro's election, but before the marriage, and several new characters are introduced.

== Cast ==
- Jon Heder as Napoleon Dynamite
- Aaron Ruell as Kipland Dynamite
- Sandy Martin as Grandma Carlinda Dynamite
- Efren Ramirez as Pedro Sánchez
- Tina Majorino as Deborah Bradshaw
- Jon Gries as Uncle Rico
- Diedrich Bader as Rex / Shasta / Male Judge
- Jared Hess as Don / Felipe / Starla
- Phil Hendrie as Old Owl Judge / Art Doodle / Mr. Masthead / Counselor Critchlow / Coach Pratt / Doctor Jeff
- Tara Strong as Egg Queen / Candy / Shaylene / Dody / Kangaroo / Scantronica
- Haylie Duff as Summer
- Phil LaMarr as Technician / Mailman / Gorilla Lead Singer / Silver Mime
- Jennifer Coolidge as Mrs. Moser
- Tom Kenny as Curtis
- Lauren Tom as Girl / Tokiko
- Sam Rockwell as Filson
- Jemaine Clement as Professor Koontz
- Amy Poehler as Misty
- Alan Tudyk as Officer Elwood

== Episodes ==
No.	Title	Directed by	Written by	Original release date	Prod. code	US viewers (millions)
1	"Ligertown"	Crystal Chesney-Thompson	Jared Hess & Jerusha Hess	January 15, 2012	1AST01	4.4
Napoleon gets a job at a liger sanctuary and learns the animals are not the magical beasts he had imagined. Disappointed with the peaceful animals and their uneventful lifestyle, he kidnaps a newborn cub and attempts to raise it with Deb. The ligers learn of the kidnapping and invade the town. The Mayor and Police Chief flee, leaving Student Body President Pedro in command. Meanwhile, a near-blind Grandma enlists Kip to be her eyes for her, reading romance novels to her and navigating for her as she drives.
2	"Bed Races"	Frank Marino	Tom Gammill & Max Pross	January 15, 2012	1AST06	4.41
It is time for the Annual Preston Bed Races, in which competitors push beds around Preston. Rico and Napoleon compete in against six-time champion Grandma. Rico in particular is desperate to win so as to recover his pride from having lost an important football game when in high school, which he details to Napoleon as they race. The pair stoop to all sorts of tricks, including weighing down Grandma's bed with lead. They win, and Rico gets the fame and women he craved. Grandma resigns herself to a life as a regular, embroidery-loving grandmother, too old for the rough lifestyle she was used to – going as far as to donate her car to a local convent. Napoleon is tortured by dreams of guilt and reveals that he and Rico cheated. Grandma reverts to her former self, saying, "I knew I wasn’t an old lady." Rico loses his fame and prestige, but he and Grandma develop an affection for one another, and Grandma commissions a sculpture from Rico. The pair then raid the convent to retrieve Grandma's car.
3	"Scantronica Love"	Raymie Muzquiz	Julie Thacker Scully	January 15, 2012	1AST03	7.2
Science teacher Professor Koontz (Jemaine Clement) uses a computer dating program run on his Scantronica 3000 (Tara Strong) to set up the students with each other: Pedro is matched with his crush Summer Wheatly (Haylie Duff), Deb with Summer's boyfriend Don Moser (Jared Hess), and Napoleon with katana-wielding Japanese exchange student Tokiko (Lauren Tom). Deb is drawn into the Moser family, finding herself in a pre-engagement wedding ceremony on a houseboat, but discovers the unsavory side of the family – in particular Don's mother (Jennifer Coolidge). Her friends invade the ceremony and rescue her with the help of Summer. Meanwhile, Uncle Rico and Kip unsuccessfully try to earn riches by performing as a magic act.
4	"Thundercone"	Dwayne Carey-Hill	Jared Hess & Jerusha Hess	January 15, 2012	1AST04	9.5
After Kip pelts him with a piece of chicken, Napoleon breaks out in acne. At the recommendation of Uncle Rico and a suspect pharmacist, he takes an illegal skin cream called Rack-U-Tane whose side effects make him aggressive and give him increased resistance to pain. Soon he is invited to participate in blood sports at the Pioneer Punch Club. While working out, he draws the attention of Misty (Amy Poehler), a girl whom Kip has met on the internet.
5	"Pedro vs. Deb"	Edmund Fong	Dan Vebber	February 12, 2012	1AST05	3.81
Deb has become reporter for the Preston Bugle newspaper, but finds it will fold if she does not find a front-page story to lure readers. She interviews Pedro, and cherrypicks a quote that Preston is "the most boring city in America". Pedro and Deb's friendship is strained as Pedro gains the censure of the townspeople. Napoleon wants to bring his friends back together, and sets out with Kip to find the Mine Shaft Monster, hoping a front-page story on it will make the town forget about the Pedro story. They find instead Dave the Ghost, whom Uncle Rico owes money. Meanwhile Kip has developed an interest in Grandma's Gun.
6	"FFA"	Stephen Sandoval	Mike Scully	March 4, 2012	1AST02	4.05
Napoleon enrolls in a Future Farmers of America competition, which he had won the previous year. His partner Curtis drops out on him when he realizes that the FFA is unpopular with the cool kids. Napoleon enlists Pedro instead. Napoleon is swarmed with groupies who remember his last year's win, until the long-haired former champion Filson (Sam Rockwell) arrives in a sleeveless jacket and steals the attention. Filson connives to win again this year and enlists his girlfriend to distract Napoleon and Pedro with her charms. The two end up buried in soil together, and must scramble to catch up to Filson's lead. The competition ends in a tie that Pedro breaks by improvising a song of friendship. Meanwhile, the Dynamites find their home infested with innumerable spiders, and have to have the house fumigated. Rico offers them a place to sleep in his Dodge Santana van and teaches them his tricks for getting by as a homeless man.

== Release ==
=== Adult Swim Canada premiere ===
Napoleon Dynamite premiered on Adult Swim Canada in September 2015.

=== International broadcasting ===
Country	Network	Premiere date
Argentina	FX Latinoamerica	April 15, 2012
Australia	The Comedy Channel	January 7, 2013
Brazil	FX Brazil	May 27, 2012
Canada	Global	January 15, 2012
Colombia	FX Latinoamerica	April 15, 2012
Mexico	FX Latinoamerica	April 15, 2012
Philippines	Jack TV	January 28, 2012
Russia	2×2	August 24, 2012
United Kingdom	E4	March 20, 2012

=== DVD release ===
Napoleon Dynamite: The Complete Animated Series, containing all 6 episodes, was released on DVD in Region 1 on November 4, 2014, by Olive Films. The miniseries was also released on DVD on October 1, 2015, in Canada.

== Reception ==
=== Viewership ===
Fox touted in a press release that it had an averaged 2.8/7 Nielsen share and 5.8 million viewers for the six episodes, and that it ranked sixth in teenage viewership against other television networks. The miniseries ranked #56 in the adults 18–49 ratings and #103 in the total viewership rankings for the 2011–12 television season.

=== Critical response ===
Reviews for the premiere episode were mixed. Linda Stasi of the New York Post praised its humor as almost as funny as the film, and Nancy Smith of The Wall Street Journal called it "a dream come true" for fans of the film. Ed Bark of UncleBarky.com enjoyed the series and said it was "far funnier" than the Fox animated comedies Bob's Burgers and Allen Gregory. Simon Moore of Flickering Myth compared the series' "left-field laughs" favorably to the humor in The Simpsons and Futurama. On Rotten Tomatoes, Napoleon Dynamite has an aggregate score of 32% based on 9 positive and 19 negative critic reviews. The website's consensus reads: "Unfunny and hackneyed, Napoleon Dynamite doesn't understand what made the movie popular in the first place."

David Wiegand of the San Francisco Chronicle found the writing not funny, writing that he could not see "Jon Heder's expressionless face" as he talked in the animation. The Staten Island Advance said the change to animation freed Napoleon from real-world limitations, but thought it "lessen[ed] the overall appeal of the character and setting". Lori Rackl of the Chicago Sun-Times did not like the movie and liked the animated television series even less; she thought the emotions and physical humor were lost in the change to animation.

Brian Lowry of Variety gave the series a neutral review: "To say the show represents an improvement over Allen Gregory is not much of an endorsement, but there is something amusing about Heder's monotonic voice and Napoleon's utter lack of self-awareness, along with fast-paced gags like a miniature golf course where hitting the ball into Hitler's mouth wins a free round." Robert Bianco of USA Today called the first episode a "vulgarized premiere" that detracted from the film's qualities, but called the second one a "sweeter, funnier improvement". Mary McNamara of the Los Angeles Times wrote of the pacing that the "satirical silence or non-sequitur scenes slowly compiled to establish tone" in the film, but were sacrificed for the faster pace of a network TV series.

Simon Moore of Flickering Myth disagreed the faster pace was to the series' detriment, calling the film's "snail-like pace ... its biggest flaw".

== Works cited ==
- 2×2 staff. "Premiere: Napoleon Dynamite. On August 24 at 22:45". 2×2. Archived from the original on February 9, 2014.
- Adalian, Josef (July 11, 2011). "Fox Orders More Allen Gregory and Napoleon Dynamite". Vulture. New York Media. Archived from the original on March 2, 2014.
- Andreeva, Nellie (October 11, 2010). "Fox Orders Napoleon Dynamite Toon Series". Deadline Hollywood. PMC. Archived from the original on October 8, 2012.
- Ayers, Mike (January 18, 2012). "How Napoleon Dynamite becomes animated". CNN. Turner Broadcasting System. Archived from the original on February 9, 2014.
- Bark, Ed (December 31, 2011). "Mid-season merry-go-round: Fox's animated Napoleon Dynamite doesn't need to go back to the drawing board". UncleBarky.com. Archived from the original on January 26, 2013.
- Bianco, Robert (January 13, 2012). "Weekend Critic's Corner: Fringe, Napoleon Dynamite". USA Today. Gannett Company. Archived from the original on December 6, 2013.
- Bibel, Sara (February 22, 2012). "Sunday Final Ratings: Once Upon a Time, Family Guy Adjusted Up + Unscrambled CBS". TV by the Numbers. Tribune Digital Ventures. Archived from the original on December 19, 2012.
- Bibel, Sara (March 6, 2012). "Sunday Final Ratings: The Good Wife, CSI Miami Adjusted Up + Cleveland Adjusted Down". TV by the Numbers. Tribune Digital Ventures. Archived from the original on March 8, 2012.
- Channel 4 staff (July 18, 2011). "Channel 4 acquires Homeland and New Girl in Twentieth Century Fox deal". Channel 4. Channel Four Television Corporation. Archived from the original on September 11, 2012.
- CNW Group staff (December 13, 2011). "Global's Midseason Schedule Unmatched in Star Power, New Programs and Returning Hits". CNW Group. PR Newswire. Archived from the original on December 17, 2013.
- CNW Group staff (March 5, 2012). "It's a Yes for Canada: Citytv's Canada's Got Talent Becomes Most-Watched Premiere in Network History". CNW Group. PR Newswire. Archived from the original on July 14, 2014.
- Comedy Channel staff. "Napoleon Dynamite". The Comedy Channel. Foxtel Networks. Archived from the original on February 9, 2014.
- Conry, Chunky (November 6, 2014). "Napoleon Dynamite: The Complete Animated Series (DVD Review)". Zombies Don't Run. Archived from the original on November 29, 2014.
- Crupi, Anthony (December 1, 2011). "Fox Sets Premiere Dates for Alcatraz, Touch, The Finder; No Room at the Inn for Allen Gregory". Adweek. Prometheus Global Media. Archived from the original on October 18, 2012.
- Daggett, Bryan J. (July 22, 2011). "CCI: Napoleon Dynamite Panel". Spinoff Online. Comic Book Resources. Archived from the original on February 9, 2014.
- deWolf Smith, Nancy (January 13, 2013). "Does It Get Any Better Than This?". The Wall Street Journal. News Corp. Archived from the original on June 11, 2015.
- Goldman, Eric (May 15, 2012). "Napoleon Dynamite Cancelled". IGN. Ziff Davis. Archived from the original on March 26, 2018.
- Gorman, Bill (October 17, 2010). "Fox Announces Animated Comedies Napoleon Dynamite & Allen Gregory For Next Season". TV by the Numbers. Tribune Digital Ventures. Archived from the original on November 23, 2010.
- Gorman, Bill (January 30, 2012). "TV Ratings Sunday: Pro Bowl Prelims Down, Still Leads NBC Win; Once Upon A Time, Good Wife Rise, As Fox Animated Comedies Miss NFL". TV by the Numbers. Tribune Digital Ventures. Archived from the original on February 2, 2012.
- Gorman, Bill (February 14, 2012). "Sunday Final Ratings: Napoleon Dynamite, American Dad Adjusted Up; 60 Minutes Adjusted Down + Grammy Awards Finals". TV by the Numbers. Tribune Digital Ventures. Archived from the original on February 18, 2012.
- Gorman, Bill (May 14, 2012). "Fox 2011–12 Ratings Highlights". TV by the Numbers. Tribune Digital Ventures. Archived from the original on May 16, 2012.
- Hibberd, James (November 30, 2010). "Fox gives series order to Napoleon Dynamite". The Hollywood Reporter. Prometheus Global Media. Archived from the original on March 20, 2014.
- Hibberd, James (January 16, 2012). "Golden Globes ratings slip". Entertainment Weekly. Time Inc. Archived from the original on April 24, 2012.
- Jeffery, Morgan (July 12, 2011). "Fox orders more Napoleon Dynamite, Allen Gregory". Digital Spy. Hearst Magazines. Archived from the original on September 20, 2012.
- Kondolojy, Amanda (June 5, 2012). "Fox Finishes First Week of Summer with 10 of the Top 20 Shows Among Young Adults". TV by the Numbers. Tribune Digital Ventures. Archived from the original on June 9, 2012.
- Lacoste, Rai (January 26, 2012). "JACK TV Rocks The Weekend With Saturday Night Laugh!". B&L Magazine. Archived from the original on August 19, 2012.
- Lowry, Brian (January 12, 2012). "Review: Napoleon Dynamite". Variety. PMC. Archived from the original on December 13, 2013.
- McNamara, Mary (January 13, 2012). "Television review: Napoleon Dynamite". Los Angeles Times. Archived from the original on January 13, 2012.
- Moore, Simon (March 23, 2012). "Napoleon Dynamite – Episode 1: Thundercone – Review". Flickering Myth.
- Moore, Simon (March 28, 2012). "Napoleon Dynamite – Episode 2: Scantronica Love – Review". Flickering Myth.
- Moore, Simon (April 5, 2012). "Napoleon Dynamite – Episode 3: Ligertown – Review". Flickering Myth.
- Moore, Simon (April 11, 2012). "Napoleon Dynamite – Episode 4: Pedro vs. Deb – Review". Flickering Myth.
- Moore, Simon (April 20, 2012). "Napoleon Dynamite – Episode 5: Bed Races – Review". Flickering Myth.
- Moore, Simon (April 26, 2012). "Napoleon Dynamite – Episode 6: FFA – Review". Flickering Myth.
- MundoFox staff. "Napoleon Dynamite: Más Animación". MundoFox (in Spanish). Archived from the original on May 1, 2012.
- NaTelinha staff (May 27, 2012). "Séries Napoleon Dynamite e Allen Gregory chegam hoje ao Brasil" [TV series Napoleon Dynamite and Allen Gregory arrive today in Brazil]. NaTelinha (in Portuguese). Universo Online. Archived from the original on December 3, 2013.
- Rackl, Lori (January 12, 2012). "As a 'toon, Napoleon even lamer". Chicago Sun-Times. Sun-Times Media Group. Archived from the original on December 7, 2013.
- Radish, Christina (January 25, 2012). "Creators Jared and Jerusha Hess Talk Napoleon Dynamite Animated Series and Austenland". Collider. Archived from the original on May 28, 2013.
- Stasi, Linda (January 13, 2012). "Freakin' great". New York Post. News Corp. Archived from the original on March 10, 2014.
- Strike, Joe (January 25, 2012). "Sunday Night with Napoleon Dynamite: A Cult Series Turns Toony". Animation World Network.
- Washington Post staff (January 12, 2012). "Dynamite never strikes twice". Staten Island Advance. Advance Digital. The Washington Post. Archived from the original on July 3, 2013.
- Weprin, Alex (May 14, 2010). "Exclusive: Fox Developing Napoleon Dynamite Animated Series". FishbowlNY. Mediabistro. Archived from the original on September 13, 2011.
- Wiegand, David (January 13, 2012). "Napoleon Dynamite review: TV spin-off falls flat". San Francisco Chronicle. Hearst Newspapers. Archived from the original on December 12, 2013.
