= FFA competitions =

In the United States, FFA competitions are judging contests (otherwise known as Career Development Events) organized by the U.S. National FFA Organization, in which High School students compete based on their knowledge of a particular subject, usually for their school teams. The contests are organized by FFA advisors and local experts. The competitions determine which team and individuals have the best aptitude for evaluating a particular animal or item as compared to an "official". The official placings and answers are set by an expert in the discipline. Officials are often from agricultural universities or USDA employees.

== Types of competition ==
One of the most common types of competition is Livestock judging, in which teams of four students judge a series of classes (usually of four animals each) and rank them based on criteria to choose the most superior animal (e.g. muscling, conformation). In Livestock judging, students only judge cattle, pigs and lambs; classes consist of animals from across the region. An element of the contest is the reasons that students give to justify their choices, delivered in a short persuasive speech in which the contestant explains their evaluation of the animals to an official for a score (0-50).

Another common competition is Horse judging, which is similar to livestock, but for horses. Competitors evaluate the animals based on criteria such as conformation, gait, and muscling, again giving reasons.

Meat judging consists of teams of four students judging pork, beef and lamb, and is based on several contest areas, including class placing (four similar cuts or carcasses of meat evaluated on muscle, fat and bone), identification (correctly identifying the type of cut and where it came from on the animal) and carcass grading (determining the quality and yield grading of a beef carcass).

Each state has statewide competitions each year in which students compete for the state title in each contest area. The state winners can go on to compete in national competitions, some of which are held at the National FFA convention.

Other contest areas include: Agricultural Mechanics, Agronomy, Creed Speaking, Wool, Land, Homesite, Pasture & Range, Prepared Public Speaking, Horticulture, Wildlife, Floriculture, Farm Business Management, Landscape Design, Crops, Entomology, Dairy Foods, Poultry Judging, Vet Science, Food Science and Forestry

== In popular culture ==
In the 2004 comedy film, Napoleon Dynamite, the title character tastes defects in milk while competing in a Dairy Competition.
