= Jon Heder =

American actor (born 1977)

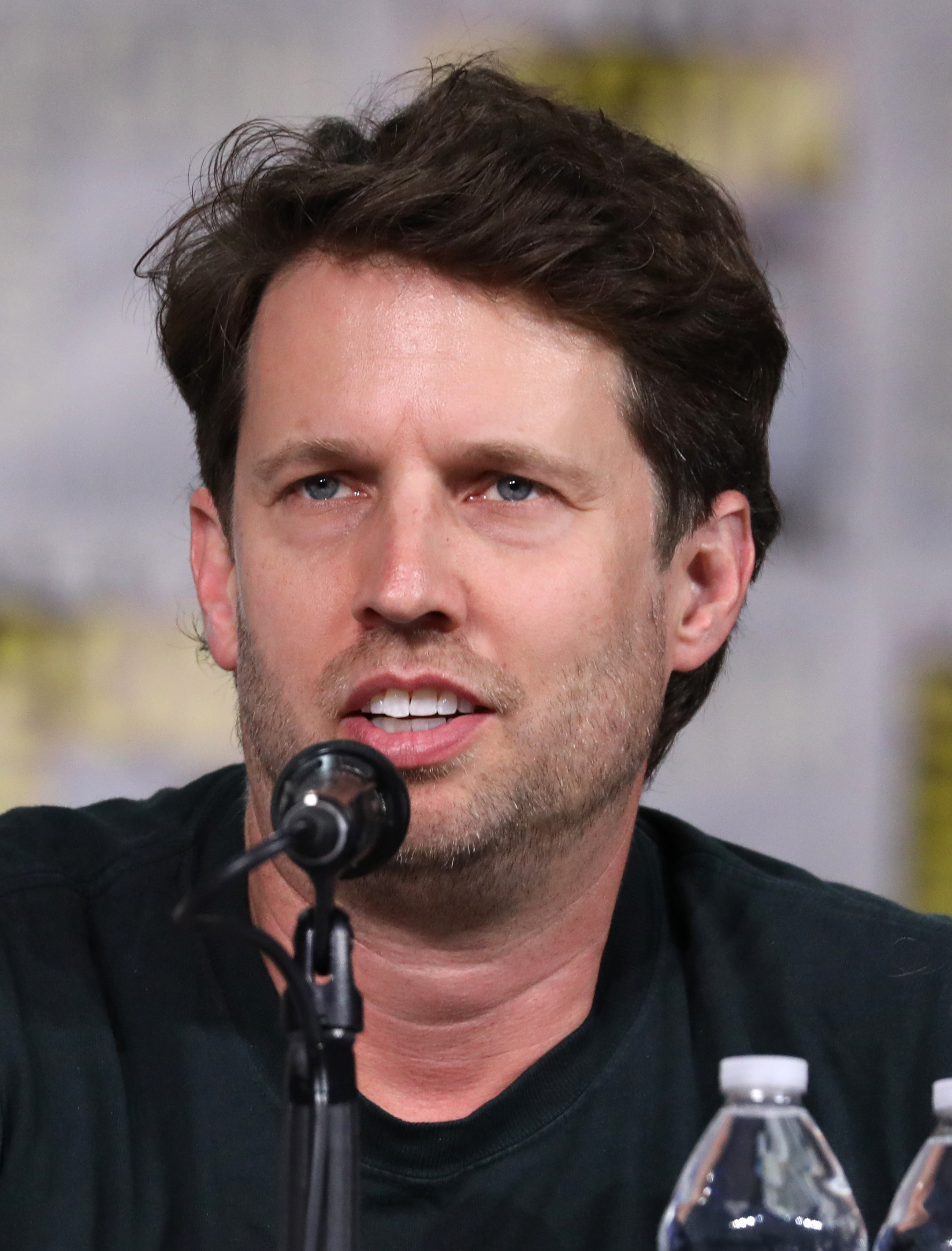
- Heder in 2023
- Born: Jonathan Joseph Heder; October 26, 1977 (age 49); Fort Collins, Colorado, U.S.
- Occupation: Actor
- Years active: 2000–present
- Spouse: Kirsten Bales (m. 2002)
- Children: 4

Jonathan Joseph Heder (/ˈhiːdər/; born October 26, 1977) is an American actor. He is best known for his breakout role as the awkward nerd Napoleon in the comedy film Napoleon Dynamite (2004). He also voiced Napoleon in the Napoleon Dynamite animated series (2012).

Heder has had starring roles in the comedy films The Benchwarmers (2006), School for Scoundrels (2006), Blades of Glory (2007), Mama's Boy (2007), When in Rome (2010), Reality (2014), and Ghost Team (2016). He also had starring roles in the drama films For Ellen (2012) and Walt Before Mickey (2015). Heder had starring voice roles in the animated film Surf's Up (2007) and its sequel, Surf's Up 2: WaveMania (2017), as well as Thelma the Unicorn (2024). He had a main voice role on the Disney XD animated series Pickle and Peanut (2015–2018).

== Early life ==
Heder was born on October 26, 1977, in Fort Collins, Colorado, the son of Helen (née Brammer) and physician James Heder. He has an identical twin brother, Dan; an older sister, an older brother, and two younger brothers. He is of Swedish descent, and is a nephew by marriage of former NFL player Vai Sikahema. When he was about two years old, he and his parents moved to Salem, Oregon. He attended Walker Middle School in Salem and graduated from South Salem High School in 1996, where he was a member of the swim team and drama club. He is also an Eagle Scout, and served as a Scoutmaster in 2010.

A 2002 alumnus of Brigham Young University, Heder worked on the short animated film Pet Shop. While attending BYU, he befriended Jared Hess and starred in Hess's short film Peluca, which was later expanded into Napoleon Dynamite.

== Career ==
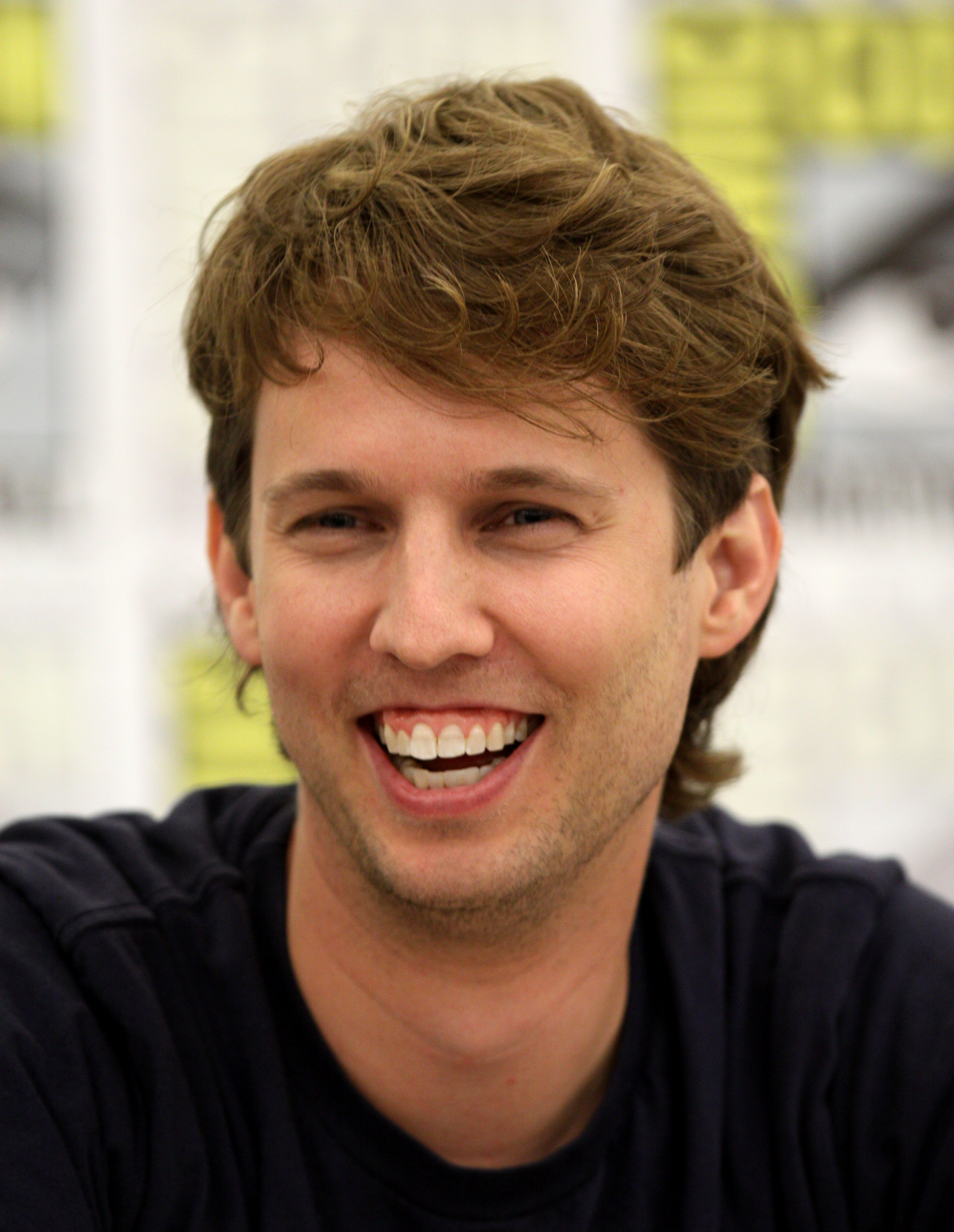
Heder in 2011

The 2004 comedy feature Napoleon Dynamite, filmed in Preston, Idaho, earned $44.5 million. In June 2005, Heder received the MTV Movie Award for Best Musical Performance and Breakthrough Male Performance for the role. On October 8, 2005, he hosted Saturday Night Live with musical guest Ashlee Simpson. Heder and his film co-star Efren Ramirez filmed a series of commercials to promote the 2005 Utah State Fair, and reprised their roles in a self-parody sketch, "Napoleon Bonamite", on the animated series Robot Chicken.

In 2005, Heder had a supporting role as a clerk in a new age bookstore in the romantic comedy Just like Heaven. In 2006, he appeared in the comedy film The Sasquatch Gang and starred with Rob Schneider and David Spade in producer Adam Sandler's The Benchwarmers (2006), a comedy about three men making up for lost chances by creating their own Little League baseball team. Also in 2006, Heder was the voice of the character Skull in the animated film Monster House and starred in the comedy School for Scoundrels, opposite Billy Bob Thornton and Jacinda Barrett. In 2007 he co-starred with Will Ferrell in Blades of Glory, in which, as in many of his films, he plays an absurd, slapstick caricature—this time, one of two rival figure skaters who must team up in a pairs competition.

Heder's second turn at voice acting came in 2007 when he voiced Chicken Joe, a surfing chicken, in the animated film Surf's Up. His first foray into web television was the 2008 web series Woke Up Dead, which he produced and starred in. The live-action, sci-fi comedy thriller follows Drex, a USC student who wakes up underwater in the bathtub one morning and suspects he may be dead.

Heder and his twin brother Dan star as villains in the fourth installment of the online martial arts comedy series Sockbaby. Heder's performance in When in Rome was praised by New York Times critic A. O. Scott: "Jon Heder as a goofy street magician is the funniest of the bunch." Heder voiced Napoleon Dynamite in the Fox Network animated series Napoleon Dynamite, which debuted in January 2012. In 2013, he appeared in the video for "On Top of the World" with numerous other Utah-based actors and musicians, and in 2014 he appeared in the video for the Chromeo song "Old 45s".

In January 2017, Heder reprised his role as Chicken Joe in Surf's Up 2: WaveMania, the direct-to-video sequel to Surf's Up. In 2022, it was announced that Heder would star in the comedy film Plan B, alongside Tom Berenger and Shannon Elizabeth.

In 2024, Heder reunited with Hess in Thelma the Unicorn, an animated film starring Brittany Howard.

== Personal life ==
Heder served a mission for the Church of Jesus Christ of Latter-day Saints for two years in Japan, where he learned Japanese. He has been married to Kirsten Bales since 2002. They met at Brigham Young University. They are members of the Church of Jesus Christ of Latter-day Saints and have four children. Heder is also a member of the Richmond Flying Mummies ownership group.

== Filmography ==
=== Film ===
Year	Title	Role	Notes
2000	The Wrong Brother	Audience Member	Short
2000	Funky Town	Officer Hardy	Short
2003	Peluca	Seth	Short
2004	Napoleon Dynamite	Napoleon Dynamite	MTV Movie Award for Best Breakthrough Performance; MTV Movie Award for Best Musical Sequence; Teen Choice Award for Choice Movie Dance Scene; Teen Choice Award for Choice Movie Hissy Fit; Nominated – Online Film Critics Society Award for Best Breakthrough Performance; Nominated – Teen Choice Award for Choice Movie Actor: Comedy; Nominated – Teen Choice Award for Choice Movie Breakout Performance – Male; Nominated – Teen Choice Award for Choice Movie Blush Scene; Nominated – Teen Choice Award for Choice Movie Liar; Nominated – Teen Choice Award for Choice Movie Love Scene; Nominated – Teen Choice Award for Choice Movie Rumble
2005	Just like Heaven	Darryl	Nominated – Teen Choice Award for Choice Actor: Comedy
2005	Tankman Begins	Batman	Short
2006	The Benchwarmers	Clark Reedy	Nominated – Teen Choice Award for Choice Movie Actor: Comedy; Nominated – Teen Choice Award for Choice Chemistry; Nominated – Teen Choice Award for Choice Rumble
2006	Monster House	Reginald "Skull" Skulinski	Voice
2006	School for Scoundrels	Roger	Nominated – Teen Choice Award for Choice Movie Actor: Comedy
2007	The Sasquatch Gang	Lazer Tag Employee	Cameo
2007	Blades of Glory	Jimmy MacElroy	Nominated – MTV Movie Award for Best Fight; Nominated – Teen Choice Award for Choice Movie Actor: Comedy; Nominated – Teen Choice Award for Choice Chemistry; Nominated – Teen Choice Award for Choice Movie Dance Scene
2007	Surf's Up	Chicken Joe	Voice
2007	Moving McAllister	Orlie	
2007	Mama's Boy	Jeffrey McMannus	
2008	Sockbaby 4	Manatu	Short
2010	When in Rome	Lance	
2011	Life Happens	Wrong Number Caller	Cameo
2011	Legend of Kung Fu Rabbit	Fu	Voice
2012	For Ellen	Fred Butler	
2012	Drained		Short, producer DC Independent Film Festival for Best Experimental/Animation
2012	Peter at the End	Peter	Short
2012	Pinocchio	Leo the Cat	Voice; 2018 American release
2013	Pororo, The Racing Adventure	Mango	Voice
2013	Bud Selig Must Die	Tim	Short
2013	Buddy Holly Is Alive and Well on Ganymede	Oliver Vale	Unreleased
2014	Reality	Denis	
2014	My Dad Is Scrooge	Raffi	Voice
2015	A Mouse Tale	Sir Jonas	Voice
2015	Weepah Way for Now	Ernie	
2015	Walt Before Mickey	Roy Disney	
2015	Huevos: Little Rooster's Egg-cellent Adventure	Mickey Mallard	Voice, English dub
2015	Christmas Eve	James	Also known as Stuck
2016	Bling	Wilmer	Voice
2016	Ghost Team	Louis	
2016	The Tiger Hunter	Alex Womack	
2017	Surf's Up 2: WaveMania	Chicken Joe	Voice, direct-to-video
2018	The Ladybug		
2018	When Jeff Tried to Save the World	Jeff	
2018	Unexpected Race	Henry	
2020	Tremors: Shrieker Island	Jimmy	Direct-to-video
2020	The Little Penguin Pororo's Dinosaur Island Adventure	Poby	Voice
2021	Funny Thing About Love	Charlie	
2021	The Little Penguin Pororo's Treasure Adventure	Poby	Voice
2022	Pinocchio: A True Story	Tybalt	Voice, English dub
2023	Tapawingo	Nate Skoog	
2024	Plan B	Evan Ebert	
2024	Thelma the Unicorn	Reggie	Voice
2024	Waltzing with Brando	Bernard Judge	

=== Television ===
Year	Title	Role	Notes
2004	Mad TV	Percy	Season 10, Episode 4
2005	Robot Chicken	Astronaut, Bully, Napoleon Bonamite	Voice, episode: "The Black Cherry"
2005	Saturday Night Live	Himself	Host, episode: "Jon Heder/Ashlee Simpson"
2008	My Name Is Earl	Joel Malone	Episode: "Girl Earl"
2010	WWE Raw	Himself	1 episode
2011	Talking Dead	Himself	Guest
2012	Napoleon Dynamite	Napoleon Dynamite	Main voice role
2012	Gulliver Quinn	Gulliver Quinn	Television film
2012	The Aquabats! Super Show!	Eagle Claw	Episode: "Eagle Claw"
2014	How I Met Your Mother	Narshall	Episode: "Vesuvius"
2014	Uncle Grandpa	Kev	Voice, episode: "Viewer Special"
2014	Kroll Show	Himself	Episode: "Blisteritos Presents Dad Academy Graduation Congraduritos Red Carpet Viewing Party"
2014	The Legend of Korra	Ryu, Ryu's Father	Voice, 2 episodes
2014	Clarence	Randy	Voice, episode: "Rise 'n' Shine"
2014	Teenage Mutant Ninja Turtles	Napoleon Bonafrog	Voice, episode: "The Croaking"
2014	Ben 10: Omniverse	Clyde Fife	Voice, episode: "Clyde Five"
2015–2019	Star vs. the Forces of Evil	Oskar Greason	Recurring voice role
2015–2018	Pickle and Peanut	Pickle	Main voice role
2016	Motive	Murray Schultz	Episode: "The Vanishing Policeman"
2016	Home: Adventures with Tip & Oh	Mopo Store Manager	Voice, episode: "Best Frenemies"
2017	VeggieTales in the City	Avacajoe	Voice, episode: "Jimmy Makes a Comic Book"
2017	All Hail King Julien	Tentacle	Voice, episode: "Raiders of the Lord Shark"
2017–2018	Stretch Armstrong and the Flex Fighters	Don Robertson / Multi-Farious	Voice, 4 episodes
2018	Swedish Dicks	Mark	Episode: "Two Dicks Walk into a Bar"
2022	Studio C	Himself	Episode: "Special Guest Jon Heder"
2026	The Legend of Vox Machina	Lionel Gayheart	Voice
2026	Nation's Dumbest	Himself	Season 1
2026	Adventure Time: Side Quest	Helios	Voice, episode: ''Sunshine Kingdom''

=== Web ===
Year	Title	Role
2009	Woke Up Dead	Drex Greene
2010	Fact Checkers Unit	Jon
2011	Dead Grandma	Host
2014	TableTop	Himself
2017	Critical Role	Himself / Lionel Gayheart
2019	Retro Replay	Himself

=== Video games ===
Year	Title	Role	Notes
2012	Epic Mickey 2: The Power of Two	Seth	Voice
2014	Armikrog	Vognaut	Voice

=== Music videos ===
Year	Title	Artist	Role
2013	"On Top of the World"	Imagine Dragons	Russian Cosmonaut
2014	"Old 45's"	Chromeo	Bar Patron
2021	"Back Pocket"	Brooke White	Cowboy/Band
