= Murder Among the Mormons =

2021 true crime TV series

- Genre: Documentary
- Directed by: Jared Hess; Tyler Measom
- Music by: Joel Goodman
- Country of origin: United States
- Original language: English
- No. of episodes: 3

Production
- Executive producers: Joe Berlinger; Ryan O'Dowd; Jared Hess; Tyler Measom
- Producer: Jannat Gargi
- Cinematography: Bianca Cline
- Editors: Greg O'Toole; Matthew Prekop
- Running time: 45-58 minutes
- Production company: BBC Studios

Original release
- Network: Netflix
- Release: March 3, 2021

Murder Among the Mormons is an American true crime documentary television miniseries following Mark Hofmann, one of the most notable forgers in history, who created forgeries related to the Latter Day Saint movement. Joe Berlinger serves as an executive producer. It consists of three episodes and premiered on Netflix on March 3, 2021.

== Plot ==
The series follows Hofmann, one of the most accomplished forgers in history, who created forgeries related to the Latter-day Saint movement. Hofmann created explosive devices resulting in two deaths, and was exposed as a forger and sent to prison.

== Episodes ==
No.	Title	Directed by	Original release date	U.S. viewers (millions)
1	"Episode 1"	Jared Hess; Tyler Measom	March 2, 2021	N/A
2	"Episode 2"	Jared Hess; Tyler Measom	March 2, 2021	N/A
3	"Episode 3"	Jared Hess; Tyler Measom	March 2, 2021	N/A

== Production ==
In 2017, Jared Hess and Tyler Measom began conducting research on the story, met with those who participated in the series and attempted to contact Hofmann, who did not respond to requests for an interview. The series was initially pitched as a six-episode series; however, when Netflix and BBC Studios joined the project, it was reduced to three episodes.

== Reception ==
On Rotten Tomatoes, the series holds an approval rating of 88% based on 16 reviews, with an average rating of 7.29/10. The website's critical consensus reads, "Investigating an outrageous but true story with restraint, Murder Among the Mormons is entertaining true-crime pulp and a fascinating examination of a community." On Metacritic, it has a weighted average score of 74 out of 100, based on eight critics, indicating "generally favorable reviews". In the week of its debut, the show was ranked third overall for original-content Video on Demand streaming, with 587 million minutes streamed, according to Nielsen.
