= Surf's Up 2: WaveMania =

2017 animated film by Henry Yu

- DVD cover
- Directed by: Henry Yu
- Written by: Abdul Williams
- Produced by: Michelle L.M. Wong
- Starring: John Cena; Jeremy Shada; Melissa Sturm; Jon Heder; Diedrich Bader; Saraya Bevis; The Undertaker; Vince McMahon; Michael Cole; Triple H
- Edited by: Mark Yeager
- Music by: Toby Chu
- Production companies: Sony Pictures Animation; WWE Studios
- Distributed by: Sony Pictures Home Entertainment
- Release date: January 17, 2017
- Running time: 84 minutes
- Country: United States
- Language: English
- Budget: $850,000
- Box office: $1.2 million

Surf's Up 2: WaveMania is a 2017 American animated sports comedy film and the sequel to Surf's Up (2007), produced by Sony Pictures Animation and WWE Studios, and released direct-to-video by Sony Pictures Home Entertainment on January 17, 2017, on DVD and digital media.

Jeremy Shada and Melissa Sturm respectively replace Shia LaBeouf and Zooey Deschanel as Cody Maverick and Lani Aliikai. Jon Heder and Diedrich Bader return as Chicken Joe and Tank Evans, respectively, while WWE professional wrestlers John Cena, The Undertaker, Triple H, Saraya Bevis, Michael Cole, and Vince McMahon make up the rest of the cast. The film received negative reviews from critics.

== Plot ==
A teenage northern rockhopper penguin named Cody Maverick lives in obscurity on Pen Gu Island, where he teaches children to surf in his own surf school alongside gentoo penguin Lani Aliikai, opposed by his rival Tank Evans, who also runs his own surf school. Cody's best friend Chicken Joe is a world-famous surfer as his prize for winning the 10th Big Z Memorial surfing competition, performing in competitions around the world and calling himself "El Pollo Loco."

Chicken Joe leaves his world tour to visit Pen Gu Island. At the same time, "The Hang 5," a team of extreme surfers and thrillseekers (consisting of giant otter Mr. McMahon, puffin Paige and penguins J.C., The Undertaker and Hunter, and their announcer Seagull), arrive on the island. Since Cody was a big fan of them from childhood, he invites the whole team to his place and throws a party in their honor. At the party, Mr. McMahon reveals that the team are on a journey to a mythical surf spot called the "Trenches" to ride a 50 feet (15 m) rogue wave, and further reveals to his team that he is retiring and came to the island to find his replacement. After Mr. McMahon and Paige choose Lani, Cody and Tank respectively convince J.C. and Hunter to sponsor them as potential replacements for McMahon, the Undertaker randomly selecting Chicken Joe so that he will also have a candidate, unaware of his fame.

The group subsequently leaves the island atop a whale. Having approached an unknown coastline, they walk (and later surf) through a desert for a time (encountering quicksand), before reaching a jungle, at which the group stops for the night. The next day, while searching the jungle, they find a temple, the remains of an ancient penguin civilization that worshipped the art of surfing, Tank discovering a golden surfboard. Further, the group uses improvised hang gliders combined with surfboards to cross a lava lake on Cody's suggestion (from having viewed hieroglyphs from the temple), during which, due to his bickering with Tank, he almost knocks Chicken Joe into the lava, and the 5 harshly berate him for his behavior, despite the incident being Tank's fault and not Cody's. Feeling immense guilt and betrayal (since Lani did not defend him), Cody leaves overnight, while the group, feeling remorse (except for Tank, obviously) for the way they spoke to Cody (especially J.C., who said that Cody was nothing like them and he never will be), since if it wasn’t for Cody, they never would’ve gotten over the lava, moves onwards towards the Palisade.

While walking back, Cody comes across another set of hieroglyphs depicting the civilization's champion riding the waves of the island and his eventual death in The Trenches, leading to Cody deciding to return to warn Chicken Joe and Lani. Meanwhile, the rest of the group arrives at the Trenches, where Seagull is struck by lightning and disintegrated; Lani deduces the "RTL" catchphrase of The Hang 5 as being in reference to the act of "ride the lightning," i.e. surfing during a thunderstorm, which they have previously done worldwide. After admitting that all members of The Hang 5 are by definition "crazy" and that one must "RTL" to join, Lani declines membership, Chicken Joe accepts an honorary membership from the Undertaker, and Tank reluctantly agrees to "RTL" in order to acquire the fame and fortune associated with being a member.

Assembling before the formation of a 50 feet (15 m) rogue wave, The Hang 5 and Tank ride atop of it as lightning rages overhead. Having changed his mind, and in fear for his life, a redeemed Tank swims off behind the wave, pursued by lightning because of his surfboard's metallic nature, while The Hang 5 continues maneuvering between lightning bolts; the Undertaker is struck by lightning and falls into the water. He is rescued by Hunter and brought to the shoreline while Paige and McMahon got a wipe out, where his heart is found to have stopped beating; the Undertaker is subsequently revived by Chicken Joe through the use of jellyfish stings (as natural AEDs). The group then witnesses J.C. brought both Cody and Tank after saving them the process. After such a selfless act, Mr. McMahon invites Cody to join their team, but he refuses, having become unwilling to abandon his friends and his island. Impressed by Cody, Mr. McMahon decides to stave off his retirement and desire for "fish milk" to remain with the team further.

== Cast ==
- Jeremy Shada as Cody Maverick, a 17-year-old northern rockhopper penguin and long time fan of Hang 5. Shada replaces Shia LaBeouf from the first film.
- Melissa Sturm as Lani Aliikai, a gentoo penguin and Big Z's niece. Sturm replaces Zooey Deschanel from the first film.
- Jon Heder as Chicken Joe (aka "El Pollo Loco"), a chicken and Cody's teammate who is now a full-fledged surfer after winning the Big Z Memorial Surf-Off. Heder reprises his role from the first film.
- Diedrich Bader as Tank "The Shredder" Evans, a king penguin, Cody's rival and the main antagonist, reprising his role from the first film. Later in the film he eventually reforms.
- John Cena as J.C.
- The Undertaker as himself
- Triple H as Hunter
- Saraya Bevis as Paige, a puffin.
- Vince McMahon as Mr. McMahon, a giant otter.
- Michael Cole as a Seagull
- Zoe Lulu as Kate
- Declan Carter as Arnold
- James Patrick Stuart as an Interviewer and Announcer

== Production ==
Since the release of the original, Mario Cantone, Jon Heder and Shia LaBeouf from the film had mentioned the possibility of a sequel several times. On March 1, 2016, Sony Pictures Entertainment announced that they have partnered up with WWE Studios for a Surf's Up sequel. Henry Yu was hired as the director of the film, making this his directorial debut while Abdul Williams was tapped to write the screenplay.

The project was initiated by World Wrestling Entertainment (WWE), which inquired with Sony for a possible project that would help expand their brand and reach a new generation of audiences. According to Yu, WWE thought that Surf's Up had "a really fun vibe. It's really light-hearted. It's got a lot of goofy, cartoony fun." He also remarked that the film is "about surfing – it's about sports. So we thought it was a natural fit." All character designs had to be approved by WWE.

== Reception ==
Surf's Up 2: WaveMania was panned by critics and audiences, with criticism being aimed at the film's poor animation quality, voice acting, cliche writing and abandoning the first film's themes in favor of promoting WWE stars. In 2023, Letterboxd ranked it #6 on the worst animated films of the 2010s. it received 30% on rotten tomatoes.
