= Star Wars Holiday Special =

1978 American television special

- Promotional release poster for the special in TV Guide
- Based on: Star Wars by George Lucas
- Written by: Pat Proft; Leonard Ripps; Bruce Vilanch; Rod Warren; Mitzie Welch
- Directed by: Steve Binder
- Starring: Mark Hamill; Harrison Ford; Carrie Fisher; Anthony Daniels; Peter Mayhew; James Earl Jones; Beatrice Arthur; Art Carney; Diahann Carroll; Jefferson Starship; Harvey Korman
- Voices of: Mark Hamill; Harrison Ford; Carrie Fisher; Anthony Daniels; Don Francks (uncredited)
- Composers: John Williams; (Star Wars theme); Ian Fraser; (Score); Ken Welch; Mitzie Welch; (Songs)
- Country of origin: United States
- Original language: English

Production
- Executive producers: Gary Smith; Dwight Hemion
- Producers: Joe Layton; Jeff Starsh; Ken Welch; Mitzie Welch
- Running time: 98 minutes
- Production companies: Smith-Hemion Productions; Winters Hollywood Entertainment Holdings Corporation; The Star Wars Corporation; Nelvana (animated segment); 20th Century-Fox Television

Original release
- Network: CBS
- Release: November 17, 1978

The Star Wars Holiday Special (Note: 'The' is included at the beginning of the title in the opening credits, as well as in some editorials.) is an American television special originally broadcast by CBS on November 17, 1978. It is set in the universe of the science fiction–based Star Wars media franchise. Directed by Steve Binder, it was the first Star Wars spin-off film, set between the events of the original film and the yet-to-be-released sequel The Empire Strikes Back (1980). It stars the main cast of the original Star Wars and introduces the character of Boba Fett, who appeared in later films.

In the storyline that ties the special together, following the events of the original film, Chewbacca and Han Solo attempt to visit the Wookiee home planet of Kashyyyk to celebrate "Life Day". They are pursued by agents of the Galactic Empire, who are searching for members of the Rebel Alliance on the planet. The special introduces three members of Chewbacca's family: his father Itchy, his wife Malla, and his son Lumpy.

The program also features the rest of the main Star Wars characters, including Luke Skywalker, C-3PO, R2-D2, Darth Vader and Princess Leia, all portrayed by the original cast (except R2-D2, who is simply billed as "himself"). The program includes footage from the 1977 film and a cartoon produced by Toronto-based Nelvana featuring the bounty hunter Boba Fett. Scenes take place in space and in spacecraft including the Millennium Falcon and a Star Destroyer; segments also take place in a few other locales such as the Mos Eisley cantina from the original film.

The special was widely panned and has never been rebroadcast nor officially released on home video in any format in its entirety (save for its more favorably-received cartoon segment). It has become a cult classic due to the underground quality of its existence, and it has been viewed and distributed in off-air recordings of the original 1978 CBS television broadcast by fans as bootleg copies, and uploaded to content-sharing websites.

== Plot ==
On Life Day, Chewbacca, accompanied by Han Solo, is headed home to see his family. Along the way, the duo is chased by two Star Destroyers, but they escape into hyperspace. Meanwhile, on Kashyyyk, Chewbacca's family is preparing for his return. Hoping to find the Millennium Falcon, his wife, Malla, runs a computer scan for starships in the area but is unsuccessful.

Malla contacts Luke Skywalker, who, along with R2-D2, is working on his X-wing fighter. Luke tells her that he does not know what happened. Malla contacts local trader Saun Dann, telling her through a carefully worded message that Han and Chewbacca are on their way and should be arriving soon. Malla then attempts (unsuccessfully) to prepare a meal, the instructions of which are being aired via a local cooking show by an eccentric four-armed alien cook, Chef Gormaanda.

Saun arrives with Life Day gifts for everyone, including a virtual reality fantasy program (featuring Diahann Carroll) for Itchy. Back on the Falcon, Chewbacca and Han have just come out of hyperspace not far from Kashyyyk. Han notices an increased Imperial presence, so they decide to land in an unguarded area to the north.

As they enter the atmosphere, Lumpy hears the roaring of the ship. Believing Han and Chewie might be arriving, Malla opens the door, but instead finds two stormtroopers and officers. The Imperials force their way into the house. An officer orders a search for Chewbacca.

As they search, Saun and the others attempt to distract them with food and Malla's music video box (which features a video by Jefferson Starship). When the music finishes, the head officer orders the search to continue. The head officer tells Malla to keep Lumpy busy while they search his room, so Lumpy (and the viewing audience) uses a viewscreen to watch a cartoon of one of his father's many adventures:

During a search for a talisman, the Millennium Falcon crashes on the water moon of Panna with Han and Chewie onboard. Luke and the droids, who have followed the Falcon in a Y-wing, encounter Boba Fett, who saves Luke from a giant monster and claims to want to help the Rebels. They all board the Falcon, where they discover Han has been infected by a mysterious sleeping virus caused by the talisman. Luke contracts the virus as well and is rendered unconscious. Fett and Chewie travel to the Imperial-occupied Panna City to get the cure, but when they arrive, Fett instructs Chewie to stay behind—so he can contact Darth Vader. On the Falcon, as C-3PO is caring for Han and Luke, R2-D2 intercepts the transmission between Vader and Fett. Evading the Imperials, Fett and Chewie return to the Falcon with the cure. After everyone recovers from the virus, the droids inform Han and Luke of Fett's true allegiance. Fett holds them at gunpoint before flying away using his jetpack, promising they will meet again. The heroes take off and return to the Rebel base aboard the Falcon.

Lumpy works to create a translation device that will fool the Imperials into returning to their base by faking their commander's voice. To do so, he first must watch the manual for the device, being presented by a malfunctioning, incompetent robot. While the Imperials are searching downstairs, the living room viewscreen activates, announcing that Tatooine is being put under curfew by the Empire because of "subversive forces".

The video is announced as required viewing for all Imperial forces and much of it features Ackmena running the Mos Eisley cantina. Ackmena is approached by an admirer: Krelman, an amorous alien, who has misunderstood something she said to him recently. Ackmena announces last call, and upon being ignored, sings a farewell song.

Lumpy uses this opportunity to put his plan into motion, faking a repeated call for the Imperials to "return to base". They leave, but one stormtrooper stays behind and discovers Lumpy's ruse. He destroys the machine, then chases Lumpy outside, just as Han and Chewbacca finally arrive. Chewie protects Lumpy as Han kills the stormtrooper by tricking him into falling over the railing.

After the family are reunited, an Imperial officer appears on the viewscreen, giving a general alert for the missing stormtrooper. Saun quickly responds that the trooper stole supplies and deserted. The danger averted, the family prepares to go to the festival at the great Tree of Life. They hold glowing orbs, and appear in space wearing red robes.

Wookiees walk into a bright star and arrive at the Tree of Life, where many are gathered, including C-3PO and R2-D2. Luke, Leia, and Han also appear. Leia gives a short speech and sings a song in celebration. Chewie remembers his adventures during the events of the original film. Finally, the Wookiee family sits around a table and bow their heads.

== Cast ==
- Mark Hamill as Luke Skywalker
- Harrison Ford as Han Solo
- Carrie Fisher as Princess Leia
- Anthony Daniels as C-3PO
- Peter Mayhew as Chewbacca
- James Earl Jones as Darth Vader (voice)
- Beatrice Arthur as Ackmena
- Art Carney as Trader Saun Dann
- Diahann Carroll as Mermeia Holographic
- Jefferson Starship (Marty Balin, Craig Chaquico, Paul Kantner, David Freiberg, Pete Sears, John Barbata) as holographic band
- Harvey Korman as Krelman / Chef Gormaanda / Amorphian instructor
- Mickey Morton as Malla / Tork (uncredited) / Chef Gormaanda's second pair of arms (uncredited)
- Paul Gale as Itchy
- Patty Maloney as Lumpy
- Jack Rader as Imperial Guard Officer
- Stephanie Stromer
- Michael Potter as Imperial Guard
- The Wazzan Troupe
- Yuichi Sugiyama as the "Ring-Master"
- The Mum Brothers
- Claude Woolman as Imperial Officer
- Lev Mailer as Imperial Guard
- John McLaughlin
- David Prowse (archive footage) as Darth Vader (uncredited)
- Alec Guinness (archive footage) as Obi-Wan Kenobi (uncredited)
- Leslie Schofield (archive footage) as Imperial Officer (uncredited)
- Marcus Powell (archive footage) as Rycar Ryjerd (uncredited)

Kenny Baker, who played R2-D2 in the films, was not involved in the special. The droid was performed entirely by a radio-controlled unit, operated by Mick Garris (Lucas's receptionist). In the credits, R2-D2 is credited by announcer Art James as playing himself.

Because James Earl Jones was originally uncredited in Star Wars, the special marked the first time he was credited as the voice of Darth Vader.

Malla's mask was repurposed from a Chewbacca mask from the original film. The names of Chewbacca's family were later explained to have been nicknames, their full names being Mallatobuck (Malla), Attichitcuk (Itchy), and Lumpawarrump or Lumpawaroo (Lumpy).

== Production ==
While outlining the original Star Wars and planning its potential sequels, Lucas imagined a "film just about Wookiees, nothing else." After the original film's success, its cast made a few appearances on TV variety shows. According to Charles Lippincott, who was head of marketing of the Star Wars Corporation, CBS brought the idea of doing a TV special to him and Lucas, although there is some internal dispute about this claim. According to J.W. Rinzler, "Everybody agreed that a television special was a good idea." Lucas was busy moving his production company, which was not heavily involved in the special, to a new location. According to Lucasfilm producer Gary Kurtz:

It did start out to be a lot better [with a different script]. We had half a dozen meetings with the TV company that was making it. In the end, because of work on promoting Star Wars and working on the next film, we realized we had no time. So we just left it to them and just had the occasional meetings with them, provided them with access to props and the actors, and that was it.

Though Lucas is uncredited, it was his idea to build the narrative around Chewbacca's family. CBS hired experienced variety show writers and producers, including writer Bruce Vilanch, who was concerned about the decision to center the special on a species who grunt in a fictional language without subtitles. Regardless, Lucas would not budge on his vision. The special went through two directors. The first, David Acomba, was brought in through an attempt to "make us different in variety shows", according to Lippincott.

Acomba, a classmate of George Lucas at USC film school, was unfamiliar with a multiple-camera setup, which caused some problems. Acomba also felt that there was a divide between himself and the producers, and chose to leave the project after finishing only a few scenes, including the cantina and Jefferson Starship. He was replaced by Steve Binder, whose only contact with Lucasfilm was a "Wookiee bible" detailing how the species should look and behave. Stan Winston was hired to design the Wookiee family.

The special was broadcast in its entirety in the United States only once, on Friday, November 17, 1978 (the week before Thanksgiving), on the television network CBS from 8:00 pm to 10:00 pm, Eastern Standard Time (EST), preempting Wonder Woman and The Incredible Hulk leading to the latter shows' episodes slated to be aired that day to instead be shown a week later. It was also broadcast on the Canadian television network CTV from 7:00 pm to 9:00 pm, Eastern Standard Time.

== Segments ==
All the acts are loosely linked together with material that involves the Wookiees' preparation for Life Day on Kashyyyk, Han and Chewie's attempt to bypass the Imperial blockade and make it to Chewie's family, and the Imperial garrison's search for rebels. The plot strings together a series of musical numbers, celebrity cameos and other variety-show acts. These include songs and comedy routines by such 1970s talents as Jefferson Starship, Diahann Carroll, Art Carney, Harvey Korman, and Bea Arthur, as well as a circus-style acrobatics routine including uneven bars and juggling. The most notable segment is an animated cartoon featuring the onscreen debut of Boba Fett.

=== Music ===
Original music was composed for The Star Wars Holiday Special by Ken and Mitzie Welch, while Ian Fraser was brought in to adapt John Williams' orchestral themes from Star Wars. The special features four songs:

1. "This Minute Now" is sung by Diahann Carroll. Carroll – who is supposed to be an image created by a virtual reality machine – tells Chewbacca's father, Itchy, that she is his "fantasy" and suggestively invites him to "experience" her.
2. "Light the Sky on Fire", performed by Jefferson Starship, which is presented as a 3D music video watched by one of the Imperial guards; during production the song was given the working title "Cigar-Shaped Object (Vanished Without a Trace)" (the song was included as a bonus 45 rpm single in the Jefferson Starship greatest hits collection Gold). (The clip marked Marty Balin's final appearance with Jefferson Starship, as he had left the band in October 1978, a month before the special was broadcast. He later rejoined the band in 1993.)
3. Later, Bea Arthur, who plays Ackmena, proprietress of the Mos Eisley cantina, sings "Good Night, But Not Goodbye" set to the Cantina Band theme. Some of the same aliens seen in the cantina in Star Wars reappear, including the band Figrin D'an and the Modal Nodes, as back-up musicians.
4. Finally, at the end of the special, Carrie Fisher sings a song in celebration of Life Day to the tune of "Star Wars (Main Title)" by John Williams.

=== Comedy ===
Harvey Korman provides comedy in three of the special's skits, including the cantina skit with Bea Arthur where he plays a love-struck barfly who drinks through a hole in the top of his head. He also performs two solo routines: one as Chef Gormaanda, a four-armed parody of Julia Child (the four arms allow her to work much faster than Malla can keep up with) and one as a malfunctioning Amorphian android named Dromboid in an instruction video watched by Lumpy.

Art Carney has a more integral role in the story, playing a trader named Saun Dann on Kashyyyk who is a member of the rebellion and helps Chewie's family. His segments are also largely played for laughs, and at one point includes a scene alluding to his character Ed Norton from The Honeymooners, where an Imperial officer demands that he "get on with it" while Carney dallies with a prop, thus introducing the Jefferson Starship performance.

=== Cartoon ===
The high point of the special is generally considered to be the animated segment known as "The Faithful Wookiee", which is the first official Star Wars cartoon. It was written by Lucas and produced by Toronto animation firm Nelvana Ltd., which later produced Droids and Ewoks, two Saturday-morning series based on the franchise in 1985 on ABC. Lucas requested that the visual style be inspired by French comics artist Jean Giraud, also known as Moebius. The vocal talents of the main cast are featured. Intended as an in-universe flashback, Luke wears a yellow jacket similar to his outfit at the end of A New Hope.

The cartoon introduces Boba Fett, whose appearance was based on footage of the unpainted costume from The Empire Strikes Back, and according to Nelvana co-founder Clive Smith, their suggestion to "scuff up his costume a little bit" influenced the character's live-action appearance. The final costume design made a public parade appearance two months before the Holiday Special aired. The simplified color scheme for the cartoon was later repeated for Fett's appearance in Droids. Fett was voiced by Don Francks in the special.

Separate from the rest of the special, as of April 2021, the cartoon is available to view as "The Story of the Faithful Wookiee" on the streaming platform Disney+.

== Reception ==
=== Critical response ===
The Star Wars Holiday Special was universally lambasted by critics, audiences, and Star Wars fans alike. Jerry Buck, in a November 1978 review for the Associated Press, called the program "bubble gum for the brain". Nathan Rabin of The A.V. Club wrote, "I'm not convinced the special wasn't ultimately written and directed by a sentient bag of cocaine." David Hofstede, author of What Were They Thinking?: The 100 Dumbest Events in Television History, ranked the holiday special at number one, calling it "the worst two hours of television ever". On the review-aggregator website Rotten Tomatoes, the film holds a 25% approval rating, based on 16 reviews, with an average rating of 3.4/10.

Writing for Fatherly, Nathan Rabin says the cartoon segment is singular compared to the rest of the special in that it "feels worthy of being canon and not a hypnotically insane aberration".

=== Recognition ===
The special was ranked at No. 3 in "The Five Goofiest Moments of the Star Wars Mythos" in the 62nd issue of the UK's Star Wars magazine. TV Guide ranked it at number 11 on their "25 Most Hilarious Holiday TV Moments", mentioning that it was "unintentionally hilarious". Both TV Guide and TV Land ranked the special at No. 59 on their "Top 100 Unexpected Television Moments" in a five-part special that aired from December 5 until December 9, 2005.

In 2008, the Star Wars Holiday Special was selected to be shown at the Paley Center for Media by 59% of voters in an online poll of Christmas specials (which allowed users to vote on five titles), beating A Charlie Brown Christmas (34.6%), How the Grinch Stole Christmas! (31.3%) and Rudolph the Red-Nosed Reindeer (28.4%), among others.

=== Reception from cast and crew ===
Other than writing the animated short, George Lucas did not have significant involvement with the film's production (Note: Patty Maloney, who played Lumpy, stated in 2008 that Lucas was sent dailies of each day's shooting for approval, but otherwise Maloney did not see the franchise creator on set.) and was reportedly unhappy with the results. In 1987, Lucas reportedly said of the special: "I believe it will be released on videotape. I'm not sure if they're going to rerun it on television or not." In a May 2005 interview, Lucas was asked if the film had soured him on working in television. He replied:

The special from 1978 really didn't have much to do with us, you know. I can't remember what network it was on, but it was a thing that they did. We kind of let them do it. It was done by... I can't even remember who the group was, but they were variety TV guys. We let them use the characters and stuff and that probably wasn't the smartest thing to do, but you learn from those experiences.

In 2006, Harrison Ford made an appearance on Late Night with Conan O'Brien, and jokingly did not even acknowledge its existence at first when asked about it, then saying that he had never seen it. On the 2010 television program Times Talk, New York Times columnist David Carr asked Carrie Fisher about the special; she said that she made Lucas give her a copy of the special in exchange for recording commentary for the Star Wars trilogy so that she would "have something for parties ... when [she] wanted everyone to leave". In 2018, Mark Hamill admitted to not having seen the entire special. In his 2019 autobiography, Anthony Daniels referred to the special as a "turd".

The official Star Wars site states that the special "delivered mixed results" and states that its highlight was the Boba Fett animated segment. The official site also says, when referring to the fan interest in seeing the Wookiees on-screen, "the 1978 Holiday Special didn't cut it". The official site also refers to the Boba Fett animated segment as "a cult classic".

== Distribution ==
Despite the special only airing once on American television, bootleg recordings uploaded to the Internet led to it becoming a cult classic among Star Wars fans. The cartoon segment appeared as an Easter egg on the 2011 Star Wars: The Complete Saga Blu-ray set, making it the only portion of the special to be officially released in any home video format. The cartoon was also released on Disney+ on April 2, 2021, under the name The Story of the Faithful Wookiee.

=== International broadcast ===
The program was seen in Canada on CTV on the same evening as the CBS broadcast. Toronto CTV station CFTO-TV aired the program at 7 pm, an hour earlier than seen on the nearest American outlet, WIVB-TV in Buffalo, New York. It was also distributed and seen in Australia and New Zealand. In Australia it was repeated multiple times on local stations between 1979 and 1984. It aired in France on January 1, 1980, on TF1, in a shortened 72-minute version, dubbed in French.

It was shown on Swedish SVT on May 31, 1979 as Stjärnornas krig – och fred (literally "Star Wars – and Peace").

It aired in the Republic of Ireland on RTÉ 2 on 27 December 1979. The special was also broadcast in Honduras on Canal 5 and Brazil on TV Bandeirantes (on Christmas Day, 1981).

== Related media tie-ins ==
- Prior to the special's airing, the Kenner toy company considered creating an action-figure line based on the special. While the project was canceled because of the unpopularity of the special, several prototype versions of the figures are known to have been created. Those depict the Chewbacca family and seem to be simply modifications of Kenner's officially released Chewbacca figure.
- Jefferson Starship released their song from the special, "Light the Sky On Fire", as a single, with their 1974 song "Hyperdrive" as the B-side. Cash Box said of it that a "dashing rhythm section of double-timing drums and pounding bass line underpin this unusual Starship track."
- In 2007, Hasbro released the Boba Fett "Animated Debut" action figure, using his likeness from the cartoon segment.
- On January 4, 2022, a Little Golden Book adaptation of Story of the Faithful Wookiee was published by Random House, adapted by Christopher Nicholas and featuring art adapted from the original animation.

== Legacy ==
=== Canonicity ===
Despite the unpopularity of the special, Lucasfilm maintained its status as part of the continuity, placing it halfway between Episodes IV and V. From 1978 to 2014, most elements of the Holiday Special fell under a secondary level of canon superseded by other licensed works.

This was clarified in 2007 by Leland Chee, who maintained Lucasfilm's internal continuity database called "the Holocron". According to Chee, the Holocron contained at least 28 entries about The Star Wars Holiday Special by that point. These placed all elements referred to in other works, such as Life Day and Chewbacca's family members, in an intermediary level of canon. Chee stated that elements not subsequently referred to were given the next lowest rank.

Chee also confirmed that Leslie Schofield appears, via deleted footage from A New Hope, as an unnamed character in The Star Wars Holiday Special, and not the character he played in the former named Chief Bast. Previously this confusion had caused some fans to question whether Bast's death aboard the Death Star was genuine (drawing on a hint in the Customizable Card Game).

After Lucasfilm was acquired by The Walt Disney Company, the Holocron was retired, although J. J. Abrams confirmed that the special was still "definitely canon" in a 2015 interview. Life Day was mentioned in "Chapter 1: The Mandalorian", the first episode of the canonical live-action series The Mandalorian (2019). A hologram circus similar to the one used by Lumpy was used in "This Could Be a Real Adventure", the first episode of another canonical live-action series, Star Wars: Skeleton Crew (2024).

=== Later appearances ===
After being introduced by the special, the character Boba Fett and the planet Kashyyyk have gone on to play integral roles in the franchise, making their first film appearances in The Empire Strikes Back and Revenge of the Sith, respectively. Apart from this, more specific references to The Star Wars Holiday Special have been made, including:

- In 1979, Lucasfilm published Star Wars: The Wookiee Storybook, a children's book that reunites characters from the special.
- A 1979 newspaper comic strip by Russ Manning features another venture by Han and Chewie to Kashyyyk (Called Hazhyyyk and Kazhyyyk in the comic) for Life Day.
- Wookiee World (1985), issue #91 of Marvel Comics' Star Wars series, features Chewie's family in another adventure on Kashyyyk.
- Tyrant's Test (1996), the third book of Michael P. Kube-McDowell's Black Fleet Crisis trilogy features Lumpy and his rites of passage.
- Rebel Dawn (1997), the third book of A. C. Crispin's Han Solo Trilogy, deals with Solo's early years and early relation with Chewbacca and his family. Malla and Chewie's marriage is depicted.
- The Star Wars Encyclopedia (1998) by Stephen J. Sansweet is an official guide to the fictional Star Wars galaxy, which features elements from the special.
- The Star Wars Cookbook: Wookiee Cookiees and Other Galactic Recipes (1998) gives an official recipe for "Wookiee cookiees", a possible reference to the "Wookiee-ookiees" from the special.
- Agents of Chaos I: Hero's Trial (2000) is a novel in The New Jedi Order series, in which Malla and Itchy make appearances.
- Chewbacca (2000) is a four-issue comic book series by Darko Macan, which features Itchy and Malla recalling stories of Chewbacca's history.
- Galactic Battlegrounds (2001) is a LucasArts game which explored Itchy's past. As seen in the game, he is a great warrior in his younger days, fighting many battles.
- The 2002 Attack of the Clones web documentary "Bucket Head" features segments of the cartoon, introduced by Jeremy Bulloch, who portrayed Fett in the original trilogy.
- The Unifying Force (2003) is the final book of the New Jedi Order series. It features Lumpy, who takes up Chewbacca's life debt to Han.
- Star Wars: Galaxies (2003) was a popular MMORPG that allowed the player to visit and explore Kashyyyk. While there, the player can explore the customs of Life Day, as there are several Wookiees dressed in red robes, as in the special. Lumpy's stuffed bantha from the special can also be seen in the game. The official site for Star Wars: Galaxies even had a webpage dedicated to explaining these features in the game and the customs of Life Day.
- A Forest Apart (2003) is an e-novella by Troy Denning. It focuses on the exploits of Lumpy, after Malla allows him to go to Coruscant with Chewbacca.
- Revenge of the Sith: The Visual Dictionary (2005) explains that the gunner of one of the Oevvaor jet catamarans in the film was Itchy.
- Star Wars: Complete Locations (2005) mentions that while Luke, Obi-Wan and the droids are in the cantina in Star Wars, Ackmena is in a nearby room negotiating for a raise in her pay.
- HoloNet News (2005) featured an issue about Chef Gormaanda. Featuring a new recipe, it was explained that she had won a cooking award.
- Star Wars The Old Republic (2011) has annual events concerning Life Day at the space station for both factions, normally during the Christmas holiday season.
- Zen Pinball 2 (2012) featured a Star Wars table. Upon losing, Boba Fett says "we'll meet again, friends" to the player, which is a direct quote from his character in the Holiday Special.
- Unproduced episodes of The Clone Wars would have featured Chewbacca and Kashyyyk, and made references to the Holiday Special.
- The Star Wars streaming series The Mandalorian features a gunfighter who uses a weapon very similar to the one used by Fett in the special. (Note: The series' creator, Jon Favreau, has said that he is a fan of "certain sequences" of the special and that he "loved the introduction of Boba Fett and that rifle".) In addition, the show's pilot episode features a character directly referring to Life Day.
- The book Life Day Treasury: Holiday Stories from a Galaxy Far, Far Away by Cavan Scott and George Mann was released September 7, 2021.
- A Life Day comic from Marvel was released on November 24, 2021.

=== In popular culture ===
In 2005, Lawrence Person wrote a review of a "Platinum Edition" DVD release of the special as an April Fools hoax.

In the 2006 music video accompanying the "Weird Al" Yankovic song "White & Nerdy", the main character is seen buying a bootlegged version of the Star Wars Holiday Special. The scene depicts the exchange as a drug deal, referencing the underground status of the special.

In 2007, the comedy troupe RiffTrax, which is composed of Mystery Science Theater 3000 alumni Bill Corbett, Kevin Murphy and Michael J. Nelson, released a parody commentary on the special including the original commercial breaks.

In the 2011 Community episode "Regional Holiday Music", the main characters watch a bootleg recording of the "Inspector Spacetime holiday special", a clear nod to the Star Wars Holiday Special.

Two episodes of The Big Bang Theory reference the special. 2014's "The Proton Transmogrification", set on Star Wars Day, features Howard correcting Penny's claims that the day is "Star Wars Christmas" by pointing out Life Day. 2018's "The Bow Tie Asymmetry" shows Mark Hamill officiating Sheldon and Amy's wedding, and having to stall for time by answering Star Wars questions. When asked about the special, he appears not to remember being in it, asking questions like "Chewie had a wife?"

The Lego Star Wars Holiday Special, featuring characters from the sequel trilogy, was released on Disney+ on November 17, 2020, the 42nd anniversary of the special. The same day, io9 announced that Jeremy Coon and Steve Kozak were directing A Disturbance in the Force, a documentary about the making of the special.

The Guardians of the Galaxy Holiday Special is a Disney+ special released in November 2022. It is set in the Marvel Cinematic Universe, and director James Gunn has cited the Star Wars special as its primary inspiration.

== See also ==
- List of Star Wars films and television series
- Donny & Marie (1976 TV series)
- "Fighting the frizzies – at 11"
- "Mr. Hankey's Christmas Classics"
