= Jared and Jerusha Hess =

American filmmakers

Jared Hess
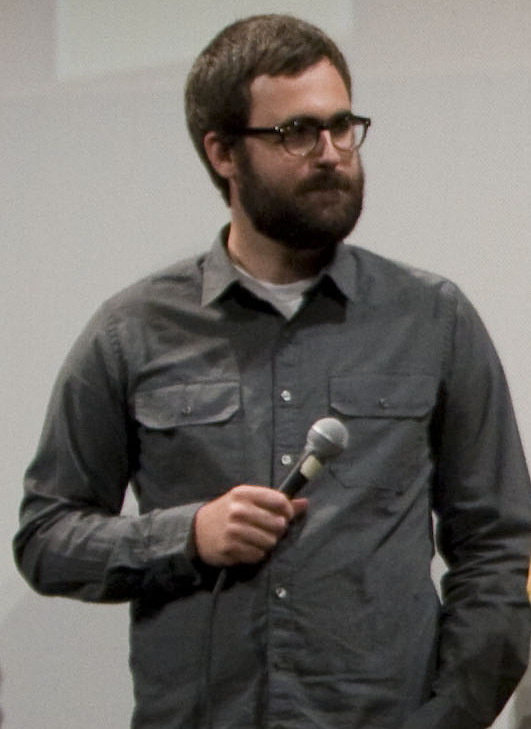
- Jared in 2009
- Born: Jared Lawrence Hess; July 18, 1979 (age 47); Glendale, Arizona, U.S.
- Occupations: Filmmaker; voice actor
- Children: 4

Jerusha Hess
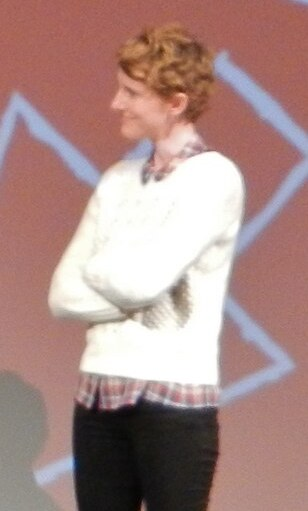
- Jerusha in 2013
- Born: Jerusha Elizabeth Demke; May 12, 1980 (age 46); Omaha, Nebraska, U.S.
- Occupation: Filmmaker
- Spouse: Jared Hess
- Children: 4

Jared Lawrence Hess (born July 18, 1979) and Jerusha Elizabeth Hess (née Demke, born May 12, 1980) are husband-and-wife American filmmakers known for their work on Napoleon Dynamite (2004), Nacho Libre (2006) and Gentlemen Broncos (2009), all of which they co-wrote and which were directed by Jared. (Nacho Libre was co-written with Mike White.) Jared also directed A Minecraft Movie (2025). For their film Ninety-Five Senses, they were nominated for the Academy Award for Best Animated Short Film.

They also produced music videos for The Postal Service's third single, "We Will Become Silhouettes", and the Killers' Christmas charity single "Boots".

== Personal lives ==
Jerusha was born in Omaha, Nebraska, and Jared was born in Glendale, Arizona. Jared attended Manhattan High School in Kansas for two years before transferring to Preston High School in Idaho, from which he graduated in 1997. Many scenes from Napoleon Dynamite were filmed there. As a teenager Jared worked in film production with T. C. Christensen.

The Hesses have four children. The family are members of the Church of Jesus Christ of Latter-day Saints.

== Career ==
Jared met Jerusha while attending Brigham Young University's (BYU) film school. Together they co-wrote the film Napoleon Dynamite, which was produced and edited by their classmate Jeremy Coon.

While at BYU, Jared wrote and directed a student film entitled Cardboard Only, which is about a seven-year-old Idaho farm boy who struggles to escape boredom while wearing a cardboard box over his head. While at BYU, Jared also wrote and directed a short film entitled Peluca, which became a prototype for Napoleon Dynamite and featured much of the same cast and plotline, including Jon Heder as Seth, "super nerd extraordinaire."

Besides Napoleon Dynamite and Peluca, Jared has worked as a camera assistant in a number of films and has played minor roles in a few Latter-day Saint comedies. These include The Singles Ward, The R.M. and Pride and Prejudice: A Latter-day Comedy. Their second movie Nacho Libre, starring Jack Black, was released on June 16, 2006.

The third major film made by the Hesses, Gentlemen Broncos, was released in 2009. It is about a teenager who aspires to be a writer, but after attending a fantasy-writer's convention, he finds that his idea has been stolen by an established novelist. The film stars Michael Angarano as the teenager, Jemaine Clement as the established novelist, and Sam Rockwell as the story's fictional title character who appears in book-come-to-life sequences.

In 2010, Jared created ads for the Utah State Fair which were run on the radio, but refused on television. The Utah State Fair representatives claimed they refused to run them due to sexual overtones, while Hess claimed the failure to run the ads was because the main actor in them, Markus T. Boddie, was an African-American.

In 2011, Jerusha directed a film adaptation of the book Austenland, which was released in 2013. She also co-wrote the screenplay.

Jared and Jerusha Hess are also among the executive producers of the Napoleon Dynamite series that aired in 2012. In addition, Jared voiced Don Moser, a returning character originally portrayed by Trevor Snarr in the film.

Jared directed the comedy heist film Masterminds (2016).

Jared was among the executive producers for the Fox TV series Making History, which premiered in 2017.

In 2019, it was announced that Jared would direct with Lynn Wang an animated musical movie adaptation of Thelma the Unicorn for Netflix. Both Jared and Jerusha would write it.

Jared co-directed (with Tyler Measom) a true crime docu-series Murder Among the Mormons, which premiered on Netflix on March 3, 2021.

In 2025, Jared directed A Minecraft Movie for Warner Bros. Pictures, with Jason Momoa and Jack Black starring. The film reunited Jared with Black after the two previously worked on Nacho Libre (2006).

== Filmography ==
=== Short film ===
Year	Title	Director	Writer	Notes
2002	Peluca	Jared	Jared	Also cinematographer
2022	Ninety-Five Senses	Yes	No	Nominated—Academy Award for Best Animated Short Film

=== Feature film ===
==== Jared Hess ====
Year	Title	Director	Writer	Notes
2004	Napoleon Dynamite	Yes	Yes	
2006	Nacho Libre	Yes	Yes	
2009	Gentlemen Broncos	Yes	Yes	Also executive producer (With Jerusha)
2015	Don Verdean	Yes	Yes	
2016	Masterminds	Yes	No	
2024	Thelma the Unicorn	Yes	Yes	Co-directed with Lynn Wang
2025	A Minecraft Movie	Yes	No	
2027	A Minecraft Movie Squared	Yes	Yes	Co-wrote with Chris Galletta, Filming

==== Jerusha Hess ====
Year	Title	Director	Writer
2004	Napoleon Dynamite	No	Yes
2006	Nacho Libre	No	Yes
2009	Gentlemen Broncos	No	Yes
2013	Austenland	Yes	Yes
2015	Don Verdean	No	Yes
2024	Thelma the Unicorn	No	Yes

=== Television ===
==== Jared Hess ====
Year	Title	Director	Executive Producer	Notes
2012	Napoleon Dynamite	No	Yes	6 episodes (With Jerusha)
2016–2017	The Last Man on Earth	Yes	No	2 episodes
2017	Making History	Yes	Yes	3 episodes
2017	Son of Zorn	Yes	Yes	Episode "The Quest for Craig"
2021	Murder Among the Mormons	Yes	Yes	Documentary miniseries, co-directed with Tyler Measom
2023	Muscles & Mayhem: An Unauthorized Story of American Gladiators	Yes	Yes	Documentary miniseries

=== Acting roles ===
==== Jared Hess ====
Year	Title	Role	Notes
2002	The Singles Ward	DJ V'dob	Uncredited
2003	The R.M.	LD3 Nerd	Uncredited
2003	Pride & Prejudice: A Latter-Day Comedy	Reverend Steve Two-Trees Green	Uncredited
2012	Napoleon Dynamite	Don, Felipe, Starla	Voice roles, 6 episodes
2013	Austenland	Travel Agent	Uncredited
2018	The Unexpected Race	Deputy	Uncredited
2024	Thelma the Unicorn	Gerald, Additional Voices	Voice role
2025	A Minecraft Movie	General Chungus	Voice role
