= A Disturbance in the Force =

2023 documentary film on the Star Wars Holiday Special

- Film poster
- Directed by: Jeremy Coon; Steve Kozak
- Based on: Star Wars Holiday Special
- Produced by: Jeremy Coon; Steve Kozak; Kyle Newman
- Cinematography: Tim Irwin; Jay P. Morgan; Quinn Hester
- Edited by: Jeremy Coon
- Music by: Karl Preusser
- Distributed by: Giant Pictures
- Release date: March 11, 2023 (SXSW)
- Running time: 86 minutes
- Country: United States
- Language: English

A Disturbance in the Force is a 2023 American documentary film directed by Jeremy Coon and Steve Kozak. The film documents how the infamous Star Wars Holiday Special was created for CBS and aired only once on November 17, 1978.

The film premiered on March 11, 2023, at South by Southwest and was met with positive reviews.

== Production and release ==
In November 2020, io9 announced that the documentary was being directed by Jeremy Coon and Steve Kozak with Kyle Newman and Adam F. Goldberg producing. The film was in the editing stage, and some additional interviews were still being conducted.

The film had its world premiere on March 11, 2023, at South by Southwest. There were additional festival screenings in May to celebrate Star Wars Day in Dallas and Milwaukee.

On "Life Day" 2023, a select theatrical run was announced leading up to a home release on digital and Blu-ray on December 5, 2023.

== Reception ==
On the review aggregator website Rotten Tomatoes, 100% of 49 critics' reviews are positive, with an average rating of 7.6/10. The website's consensus reads: "A Disturbance in the Force pulls back the curtain on an infamous chapter from a beloved franchise in delightfully entertaining fashion." Metacritic, which uses a weighted average, assigned the film a score of 73 out of 100, based on seven critics, indicating "generally favorable" reviews.

The Hollywood Reporter's Daniel Fienberg wrote, "Some of its mockery and many of its nerd-friendly celebrity talking heads — Seth Green! Kevin Smith! Paul Scheer! — are predictable, but when it isn’t poking fun at moments of iconic trash, it offers an insightful exploration of the production and context of the special." NPR's Linda Holmes said, "even if you just want to see a lot of clips of Harrison Ford looking like he wants to dissolve into goo and seep into the floor, never to be seen again, it's well worth tracking the documentary down."
