= Sandy Martin (actress) =

American actress (born 1950)

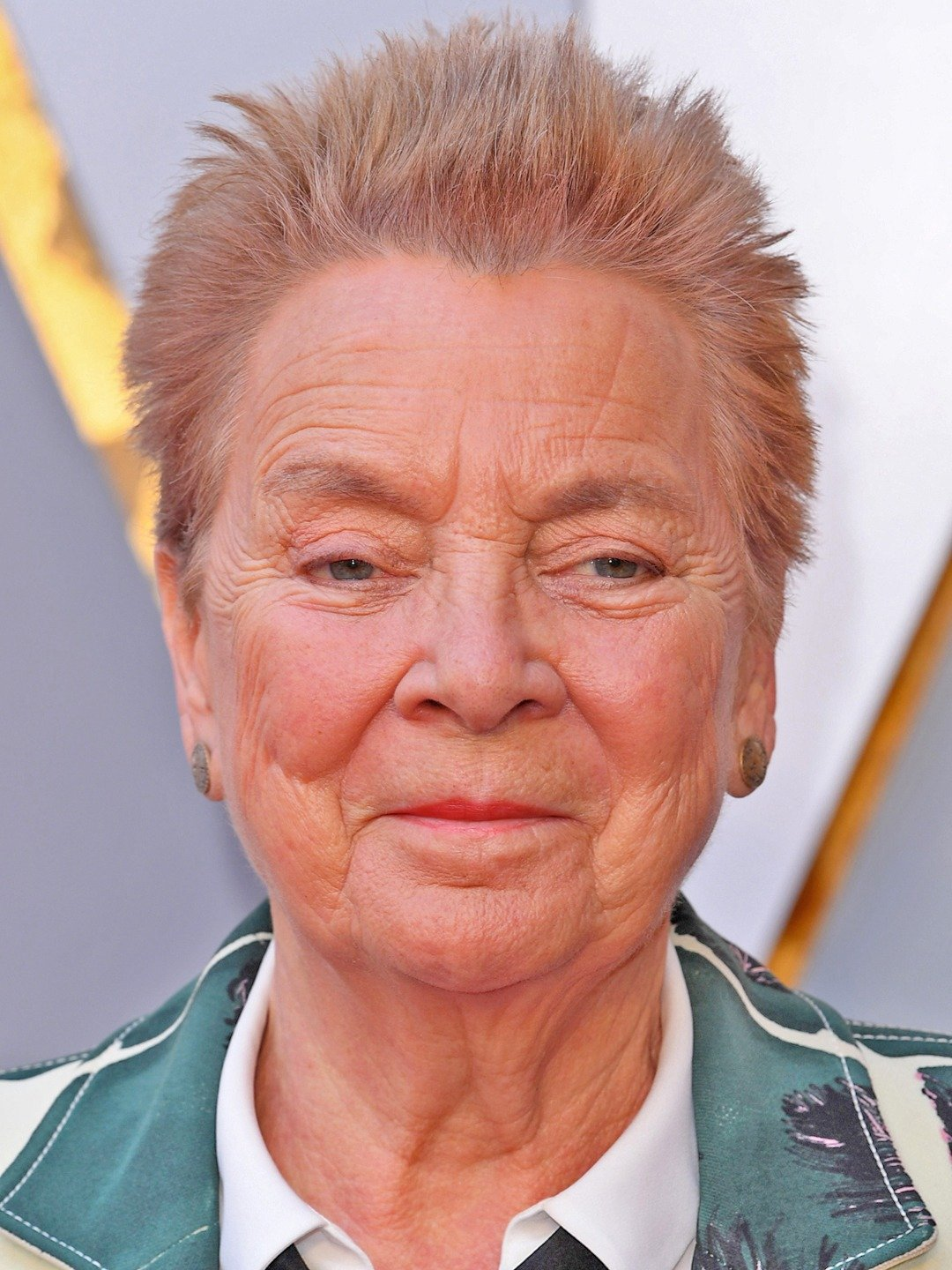
- Martin at the 90th Academy Awards
- Occupations: Actress; playwright; director; producer
- Years active: 1965–present

Sandy Martin is an American actress, playwright, director, and producer. She is best known for her roles in the film Napoleon Dynamite and the TV series Big Love, It's Always Sunny in Philadelphia, and Ray Donovan.

== Career ==
Martin started her acting career at 15 years old; she is a founding member of several successful theatrical companies in New York City and Los Angeles. She adapted the screenplays of several theatrical plays, and served as associate producer of several TNT productions including the 1993 film Gettysburg.

Martin's television roles include playing Mickey Donovan's sister-in-law Sandy Patrick in Ray Donovan, elderly nun Sister Laura Marie on Saving Grace, a policewoman in 48 Hrs., Mrs. Meredith in Real Genius, a dying burn victim in Nip/Tuck, Janice in Barfly, and Mrs. Mac in It's Always Sunny in Philadelphia. She appeared in the films Defenseless, China Moon, Speed, Napoleon Dynamite, Hot Tamale, and Marley & Me. Martin portrayed Grandma Dynamite in Napoleon Dynamite and in the animated TV adaptation of the film. In Marley & Me, Martin played the woman who sold Marley as "Clearance Puppy". Martin portrayed the mother of Sam Rockwell's character, Officer Dixon, in 2017's Three Billboards Outside Ebbing, Missouri.

Martin's recent roles include portraying Verna The Secretary in Dumbo. According to Martin, she met Dumbo director Tim Burton back in the Beetlejuice days because her friend, Glenn Shadix, played Otho in the film. The two reconnected after Ben Davis, director of photography for both Three Billboards Outside Ebbing, Missouri and Dumbo, suggested Martin to Burton for the role of Verna. Martin also voiced Grandma Paguro in the Pixar film Luca.

In the HBO series Big Love, Martin's character, Selma Green, is the sibling of polygamous cult leader Roman Grant and first wife of Grant's rival polygamous cult leader, Hollis Green. The character of Green sparked much discussion on fan forums due to her masculine gender presentation and expression, and unusual relationship with her husband (who refers to Green as "Brother Selma").

== Filmography ==
=== Film ===
Year	Title	Role	Notes
1977	Scalpel	Sandy	Film debut; Also known as: False Face
1977	2076 Olympiad	Shiela	
1982	48 Hrs.	Policewoman	
1985	Real Genius	Mrs. Meredith	
1986	Extremities	Officer Sudow	
1986	Vendetta	Kay Butler	
1987	Daddy	Ultrasound Receptionist	
1987	Barfly	Janice	
1991	Defenseless	Judge	
1994	China Moon	Gun Saleswoman	
1994	Speed	Bartender	
1995	Above Suspicion	Waitress	
1996	Female Perversions	Trudy	
1997	Sparkler	Ed	
1998	Krippendorf's Tribe	Nurse	
1998	They Come at Night	Hazel	
1999	Jawbreaker	Nurse	
2000	Marlene	Louella Parsons	
2001	One Night at McCool's	Bingo Vendor Woman	
2004	Napoleon Dynamite	Grandma Carlinda Dynamite	
2005	Adam & Steve	Biker Chick	
2006	Hot Tamale	Ed the Diner Cook	
2008	The Great Buck Howard	Female Hotel Worker	
2008	Lower Learning	Olympia Parpadelle	
2008	Marley & Me	Lori	
2009	Archie's Final Project	Mrs. Ellis	
2010	Beneath the Dark	Colleen	
2010	Pickin' & Grinnin'	Aunt Katie	
2012	Sunset Stories	Stu	
2012	Seven Psychopaths	Tommy's Mother	Uncredited
2013	Ass Backwards	Qwen	
2013	Lovelace	Ticket Lady	
2014	Some Kind of Beautiful	Susan Vale	
2016	Stars Are Already Dead	Grandma	
2017	Three Billboards Outside Ebbing, Missouri	Momma Dixon	
2018	The Head Thieves	Judy Castillo	
2019	Dumbo	Verna the Secretary	
2021	Luca	Grandma Paguro	Voice role

=== Television ===
Year	Title	Role	Notes
1977, 1981	Lou Grant	Gloria Lawder / Psych-Tech	2 episodes
1978	The Gift of Love	Jan's Mother	Television film
1981	Sizzle	Freda's Assistant	Television film
1981	The Patricia Neal Story	1st Woman	Television film
1982	Farrell for the People	Newswoman	Television film
1982	One Shoe Makes It Murder	Gloria	Television film
1982	St. Elsewhere	Mrs. Lawson	Episode: "Down's Syndrome"
1982	The Greatest American Hero	Woman	Episode: "The Resurrection of Carlini"
1982, 1984	Hill Street Blues	Bailiff / Abigail Mizell	3 episodes
1983	Carpool	Peggy Ryan	Television film
1983	Scarecrow and Mrs. King	Nurse Chapman	Episode: "If Thoughts Could Kill"
1984	Falcon Crest	Floor Nurse	Episode: "Sport of Kings"
1984	Matt Houston	Policewoman	Episode: "The Secret Admirer"
1984, 1988	Night Court	Sister Mo / Woman	2 episodes
1985	Hunter	Iris Balzer	Episode: "Sniper"
1985	Suburban Beat	Contata	Television film
1985	The Twilight Zone	Lindy	3 episodes
1986	If Tomorrow Comes	Gladys (guard)	Episode #1.1
1986	Fresno	Middle Aged Woman	Miniseries
1987	The Gambler III	Mrs. Dickey	Television film
1987	Designing Women	Hotel Manager	Episode: "Stranded"
1988	Santa Barbara	Betty Grayson	Episode #1.930
1988	Little Girl Lost	Violet Young	Television film
1988	Police Story: Cop Killer	Mona Ramsey	Television film
1989	Matlock	Manager	Episode: "The Black Widow"
1991	Equal Justice	Advocate No. 2	Episode: "Sleeping with the Enemy"
1991	Prison Stories: Women on the Inside	Counselor Pennell	Television film
1993	South of Sunset	Desk Sergeant	Episode: "Newspaper Boy"
1994	Models Inc.	Female Police Officer	Episode: "Nothing Is as It Seems"
1995	Indictment: The McMartin Trial	Deputy Phyllis	Television film
1996, 2001	ER	Sister Helen / Mrs. Zarian	2 episodes
1997	On the Line	Bartender #1	Television film
1999	Sliders	Shirley Montana	Episode: "Net Worth"
2000	Providence	Female Minister	Episode: "Do the Right Thing"
2000	Time of Your Life	Vinnie	Episode: "The Time They Found a Solution"
2001	Stranger Inside	Mrs. Johnny Cochran	Television film
2001	NYPD Blue	Annie	Episode: "In-Laws, Outlaws"
2001	Days of Our Lives	Aunt Elsie	2 episodes
2001	CSI: Crime Scene Investigation	Female Trucker	Episode: "I-15 Murders"
2003	Astro Boy	Abercrombie	English version; voice
2003	Strong Medicine	Iris Rawlings	Episode: "Jeaneology"
2004	The Division	Marriage Counselor	Episode: "As I Was Going to St. Ives..."
2005	Without a Trace	Iris Healy	Episode: "Transitions"
2005	Desperate Housewives	Woman #1	Episode: "Children Will Listen"
2005	CSI: NY	Mrs. Collins	Episode: "What You See Is What You See"
2005	Nip/Tuck	Helen Holden	Episode: "Sal Perri"
2006–present	It's Always Sunny in Philadelphia	Mrs. McDonald	16 episodes
2007	CSI: Crime Scene Investigation	Office Manager	Episode: "Sweet Jane"
2007	Cold Case	Karen Watson	Episode: "The Good-Bye Room"
2007	Jericho	Mrs. Herbert	Episode: "Coalition of the Willing"
2007	Saving Grace	Sister Laura Marie	Episode: "Is There a Scarlet Letter on My Breast?"
2007–2011	Big Love	Selma Greene	10 episodes
2008	Speed Freaks	Cop	Television film
2009	My Name Is Earl	Joy's Grandma	Episode: "Darnell Outed: Part 1"
2009	The Unit	Woman with Cane	Episode: "The Last Nazi"
2009	The Young and the Restless	Jimmy	5 episodes
2009	Hot Sluts	Jackie	5 episodes
2009	Weeds	Doctor	Episode: "Suck 'n' Spit"
2010	Warren the Ape	Agnes Osborn	Episode: "Black Lotus"
2010–2011	Svetlana	Liam	4 episodes
2011	Shameless	Doctor	Episode: "Three Boys"
2011–2013	Good Job, Thanks!	Barbara	5 episodes
2012	Napoleon Dynamite	Grandma	6 episodes
2012	Make It or Break It	Marge	Episode: "Smells Like Winner"
2012	The Closer	Mrs. Wallingham	Episode: "Last Rites"
2012	The New Normal	Miss Pepper	Episode: "Sofa's Choice"
2012	Parenthood	Dog Breeder	Episode: "Left Field"
2012	2 Broke Girls	Ms. Pyle	Episode: "And the Egg Special"
2012	Rizzoli & Isles	Kendra Dee	Episode: "Virtual Love"
2013	Quick Draw	Ma Bender	Episode: "Mail Order Bride"
2013	Dads	Ethel	Episode: "Dad Abuse"
2014	Murder in the First	Sue Leonard	Episode: "Pilot"
2014	Perception	Shirley (Homeless Woman)	Episode: "Shiver"
2014	Lab Rats	Greta	Episode: "Which Father Knows Best
2014–2017	Hand of God	Randy	10 episodes
2014–2017	Playing House	Mary Pat Caruso	6 episodes
2014–2019	The Haves and the Have Nots	Mama Rosa	3 episodes
2015	Blunt Talk	Motel Owner	Episode: "Meth or No Meth, You Still Gotta Floss"
2015	Transparent	Sandy	2 episodes
2016	Wander Over Yonder	Dorothy	Episode: "The Family Reunion/The Rival"
2017	OVER & OUT	Gert	Television film
2017	Comrade Detective	Nikita's Landlady	Episode: "The Invisible Hand"
2018	Shooter	Adele Poole	Episode: "Red Meat"
2018	Bravest Warriors	Dolores	Episode: "The Crowd I'm Seeing"
2018–2019	Ray Donovan	Sandy Patrick	13 episodes
2020	Big City Greens	Gertie	Episode: "Times Circle/Super Gramma!"
2021	Mom	Lillian	Episode: "Vinyl Flooring and a Cartoon Bear"
2022	Grey's Anatomy	Sally	2 episodes
