= Jeremy Coon =

Filmmaker (born 1979)

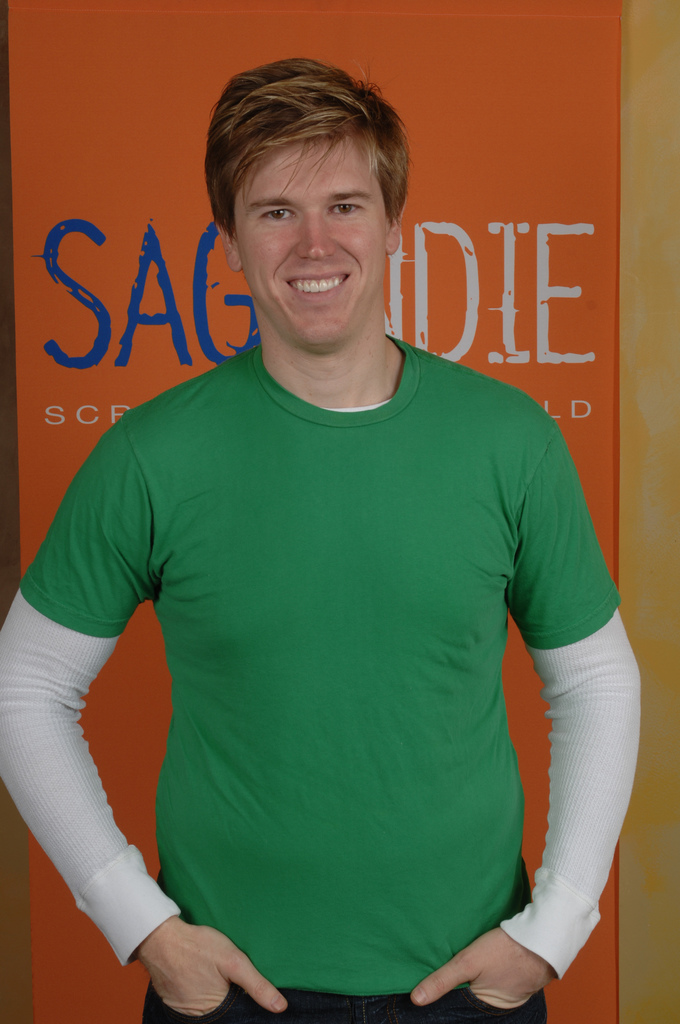
- Born: January 29, 1979 (age 47)
- Occupations: Film producer, editor, director
- Years active: 2000–present
- Notable work: Napoleon Dynamite
- Relatives: Jonathan C. Coon (brother)

Jeremy Coon (born 1979) is an American filmmaker. He is a producer, executive producer, and editor of the film Napoleon Dynamite (2004), a cult hit made on a $400,000 budget that earned more than $44 million since its release. He is also a co-executive producer of the animated series of the same name.

== Education ==
Coon attended film school at Brigham Young University and graduated in 1997 from Lloyd V. Berkner High School in Richardson, Texas.

== Career ==
He was friends at Brigham Young with fellow film student Jared Hess, where he was told of Hess' nascent screenplay for Napoleon Dynamite and agreed to raise the money to produce the film. On the opening day of the 2004 Sundance Film Festival, Coon sold the film to Fox Searchlight Pictures for $3.2 million.

After a 22-day shoot in Preston, Idaho, Coon edited the film during a nine-day cram session using Apple Final Cut Pro software for the first time. "We spent about a year assembling our crew -- 95 percent were friends from the BYU post department," he told the Apple publication Pro. "People would come by to check on me and I didn’t even know what time of day it was."

Coon co-directed the documentary films Raiders!: The Story of the Greatest Fan Film Ever Made (2015) and A Disturbance in the Force (2023), about the making of the Star Wars Holiday Special (1978). Both documentaries received positive reviews from critics.
