= Napoleon Dynamite =

2004 film by Jared Hess

- Theatrical release poster
- Directed by: Jared Hess
- Written by: Jared Hess; Jerusha Hess
- Based on: Peluca by Jared Hess
- Produced by: Jeremy Coon; Chris Wyatt; Sean Covel
- Starring: Jon Heder; Jon Gries; Aaron Ruell; Efren Ramirez; Tina Majorino; Diedrich Bader
- Cinematography: Munn Powell
- Edited by: Jeremy Coon
- Music by: John Swihart
- Production company: Napoleon Pictures
- Distributed by: Fox Searchlight Pictures (through 20th Century Fox; United States); Paramount Pictures and MTV Films (through United International Pictures; international) (Note: Excludes Canada, Latin America, Italy, Switzerland, Turkey, and Japan who are instead handled by Fox.)
- Release dates: January 17, 2004 (Sundance); June 11, 2004 (limited); August 27, 2004 (United States)
- Running time: 95 minutes
- Country: United States
- Language: English
- Budget: $400,000
- Box office: $46.1 million

Napoleon Dynamite is a 2004 American comedy film directed by Jared Hess, written by Jared and Jerusha Hess, and produced by Jeremy Coon, Chris Wyatt, and Sean Covel. It stars Jon Heder as Napoleon Dynamite, a nerdy high-school student who deals with several dilemmas: befriending an immigrant who wants to be class president, awkwardly pursuing a romance with a fellow student, and living with his quirky family.

Napoleon Dynamite was Hess's first full-length film and is partially adapted from his 2002 short film Peluca. It was acquired at the Sundance Film Festival by Fox Searchlight Pictures, which partnered with Paramount Pictures and MTV Films for the release. It was filmed in 2003 at Preston High School and different areas in Franklin County, Idaho. It debuted at the 2004 Sundance Film Festival. Most of the situations are loosely based on Hess's life. Hess grew up in Preston, Idaho and has been quoted saying that "in a strange way, then, the film was part documentary". The film received positive reviews from critics and the total worldwide gross revenue was $46.1 million. The film has since developed a cult following and was voted number 14 on Bravo's 100 funniest films.

== Plot ==
Socially awkward 16-year-old Napoleon Dynamite lives in Preston, Idaho, United States, with his grandmother, Carlinda, and his technology-addicted older brother, Kip. Napoleon's school days are spent doodling mythical creatures, dealing with bullies, and playing tetherball by himself.

Carlinda breaks her tailbone in a quad bike accident and asks Napoleon's and Kip's uncle Rico to look after things while she recovers. Flirtatious, middle-aged Rico arrives in the camper van he lives in, and teams up with Kip to sell items door-to-door in a get-rich-quick scheme. Kip wants to pay for his online girlfriend, LaFawnduh, to visit from Detroit. Former high-school athlete Rico dwells on his past and dreams of going back in time. He believes wealth will help him get over his breakup with his girlfriend and failed dreams of NFL stardom. Meanwhile, Napoleon takes a job on a chicken farm, but makes very little money.

Napoleon befriends Deb, a shy girl who sells headshots and knick-knacks to raise money for college, and Pedro, a bold transfer student from Juárez, Chihuahua, Mexico. Pedro is rebuffed when he asks the popular and snobby Summer Wheatly to accompany him to the high school dance; Deb gladly accepts. Pedro encourages Napoleon to find a date and he picks popular classmate Trisha. As a gift, he draws an unintentionally bad picture of her and delivers it to Trisha's mother, one of Rico's customers. Rico tells Trisha's mother embarrassing stories about Napoleon to evoke sympathy. She buys his wares and makes Trisha accept Napoleon's invitation. Trisha goes to the dance with Napoleon but abandons him to hang out with Summer and Summer's boyfriend, Don Moser. Pedro allows Napoleon to dance with Deb.

Pedro runs against Summer for class president. The two factions put up flyers and hand out trinkets to attract voters. To demonstrate their "skills" and increase their respect at school, Napoleon and Pedro enter a Future Farmers of America competition, grading milk and cow udders. They win medals, but it does little for their popularity. Pedro becomes stressed to the point where he becomes feverish and shaves his head, subsequently wearing a wig. He later makes a piñata of Summer for fellow students to whack, but is reprimanded by the principal and forced to remove all his campaign flyers. To deal with the bullying, Pedro and Napoleon enlist Pedro's cousins to chase off the bullies.

Napoleon buys an instructional dance videotape, D-Qwon's Dance Grooves. Kip's girlfriend, LaFawnduh, arrives and gives him an urban makeover, outfitting him in hip-hop regalia. Seeing that Napoleon is learning to dance, LaFawnduh gives him a mixtape.

Rico continues to spread embarrassing rumors about Napoleon to prospective customers. He tries to sell Deb a breast-enhancement product, claiming it was Napoleon's suggestion, causing her to break off their friendship. Napoleon confronts Rico and tells him to leave, but Rico refuses. His sales scheme ends when martial arts instructor Rex walks in on Rico demonstrating the breast-enhancement product on his wife, and assaults him.

On Election Day, Summer gives a speech before the student body, and presents a dance skit to the Backstreet Boys' "Larger than Life" with the Happy Hands club as her backup dancers. Pedro gives a despondent speech after discovering he is also required to perform a skit. Napoleon gives the sound engineer LaFawnduh's mixtape and does a dance routine to Jamiroquai's "Canned Heat", wearing a "Vote for Pedro" shirt. He receives a standing ovation, stunning Summer and Don.

Pedro becomes class president, Grandma returns from the hospital, Rico reunites with his girlfriend, Kip and LaFawnduh leave on a bus for Michigan, and Napoleon and Deb reconcile and play tetherball together.

Two months later, Kip and LaFawnduh get married, and Napoleon arrives on a stallion he tamed for Kip and LaFawnduh to ride out on.

== Cast ==
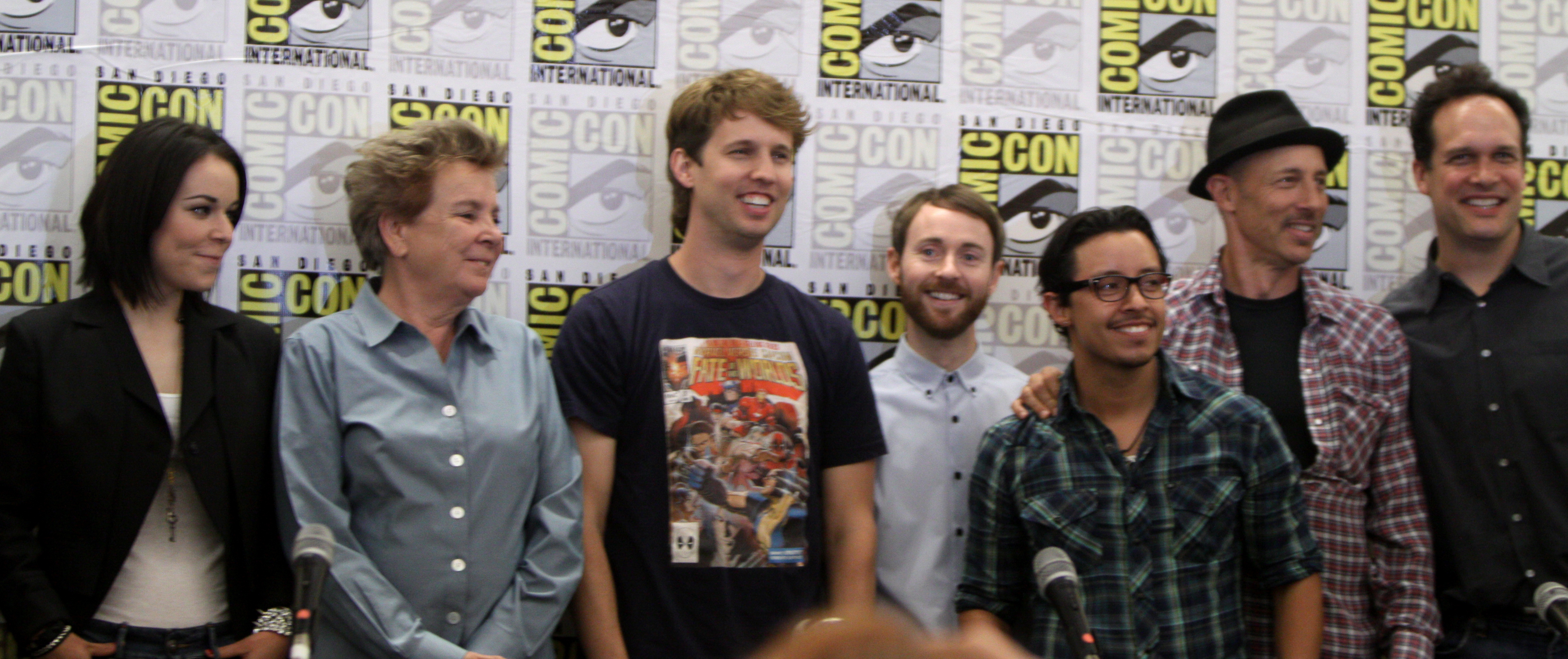
The cast of Napoleon Dynamite in 2011 (from left to right: Majorino, Martin, Heder, Ruell, Ramirez, Gries, and Bader)

- Jon Heder as Napoleon Dynamite
- Efren Ramirez as Pedro Sánchez
- Tina Majorino as Deborah "Deb" Bradshaw
- Aaron Ruell as Kipland Ronald "Kip" Dynamite
- Jon Gries as Uncle Rico Dynamite
- Haylie Duff as Summer Wheatly
- Emily Kennard as Trisha Stevens
- Shondrella Avery as LaFawnduh Lucas
- Sandy Martin as Grandma Carlinda Dynamite
- Diedrich Bader as Rex
- Carmen Brady as Starla
- Trevor Snarr as Don Moser
- Ellen Dubin as Ilene
- Dale Critchlow as Lyle
- Tom Lefler as Principal Svadean

== Production ==
=== Origin ===
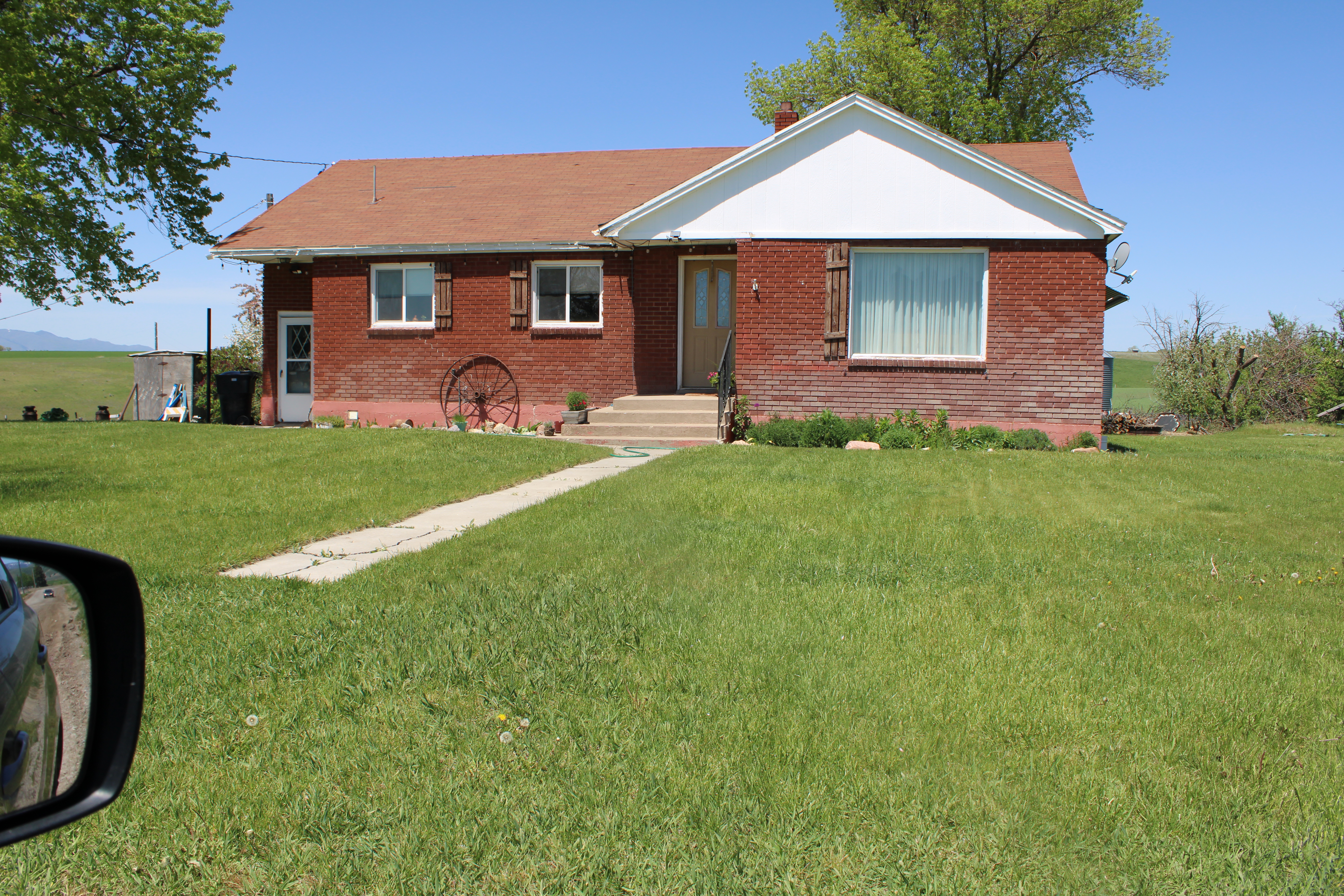
Napoleon Dynamite's house, located at 1447 East 800 North Road, Preston, Idaho.

In 2002, Brigham Young University film students Jon Heder and Jared Hess collaborated on a class project; the result was Peluca, a nine-minute short movie on black-and-white 16mm film about a nerdy high school student named Seth.

Peluca was shown at the 2003 Slamdance Film Festival and well received. Jeremy Coon convinced Hess to drop out of school and adapt it into a feature-length film, and helped him find investors for the project. Hess sent the short film and the script to various casting directors, many of whom found the idea "too weird, or they just didn't like the character", Hess said. One casting director suggested Jake Gyllenhaal for the lead role but Hess believed Heder was the only actor for the part. Jason Lee was offered the role of Uncle Rico and Brad Garrett auditioned for Rex and enjoyed the script, but decided not to commit. Vincent Gallo was considered and almost cast as Uncle Rico. Heder was paid $1,000 for starring in the film, but negotiated for more after it became a runaway success.

=== Filming and setting ===
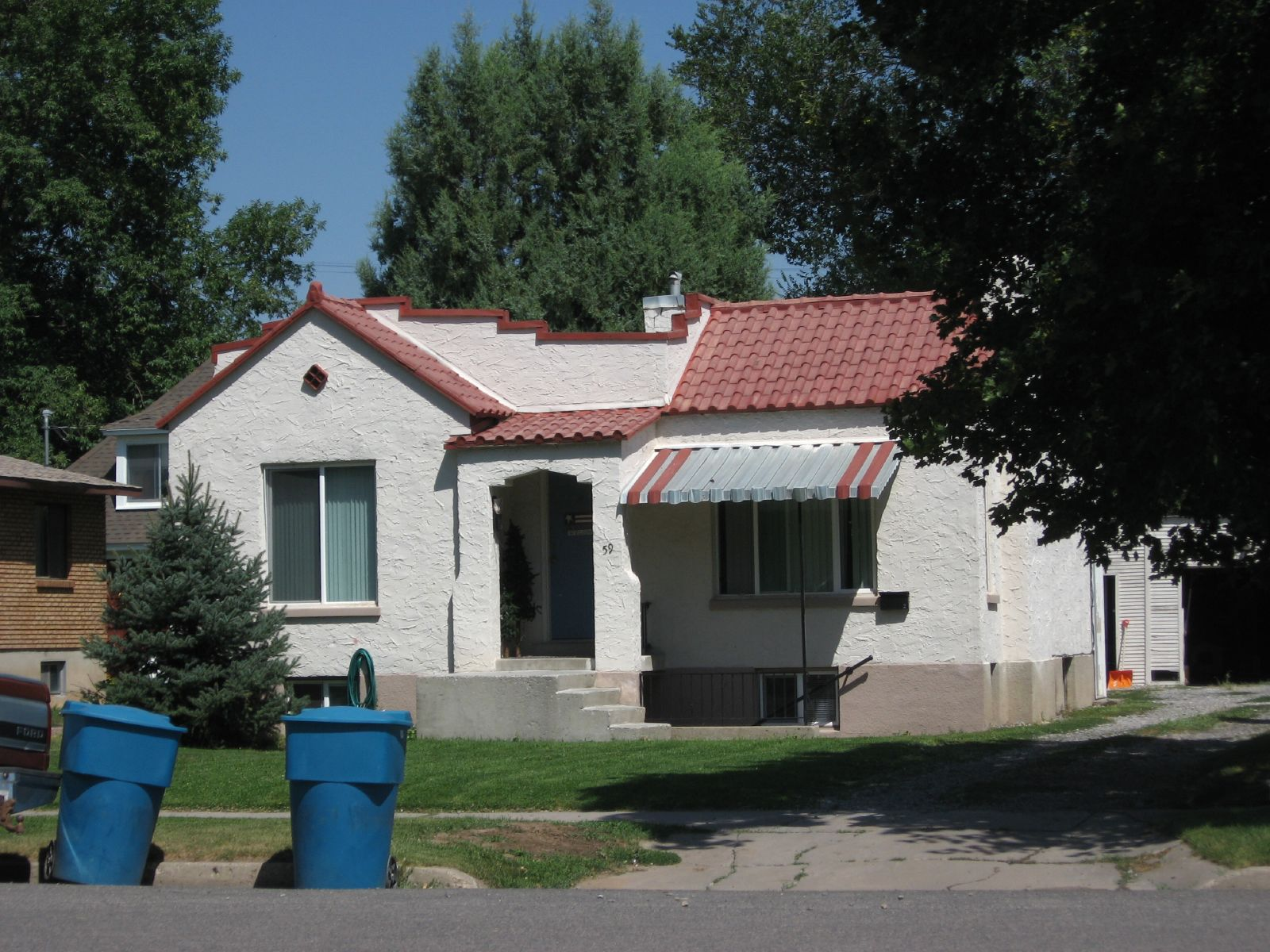
Pedro's house, located in Preston, Idaho

Hess shot the film on location in Preston, in southeastern Idaho near the Utah border, in July 2003. Operating on a tight budget of $400,000, he cast many of his friends from school, including Heder and Aaron Ruell, while generous locals provided housing and food to crew members. Among the established actors in the cast was comedy veteran Diedrich Bader, who filmed his scenes as virile martial art instructor Rex in one day. He recalled in 2011 that Napoleon Dynamite "still to this day [is] one of the two top scripts I've ever read", alongside Office Space (1999), one of his most-recognized roles. "It was very, very hot", Hess said in an interview. "But it was so much fun being in this rural farm town making a movie. We shot it in 23 days, so we were moving very, very fast; I just didn't have a lot of film to be able to do a lot of takes. It was a bunch of friends getting together to make a movie. It was like, 'Are people going to get this? Is it working?'"

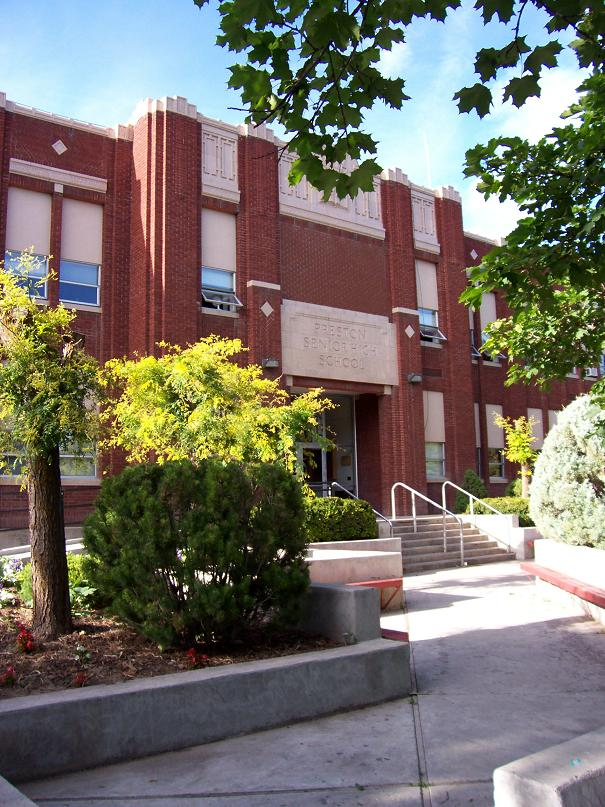
Preston High School was one of the filming locations for the movie.

Hess has called the film "so autobiographical". In an interview, he said: "I grew up in a family of six boys in Preston, Idaho, and the character of Napoleon was a hybrid of all the most nerdy and awkward parts of me and my brothers growing up. Jerusha really was like Deb growing up. Her mom made her a dress when she was going to a middle school dance and she said, 'I hadn't really developed yet, so my mom overcompensated and made some very large, fluffy shoulders.' Some guy dancing with her patted the sleeves and actually said, 'I like your sleeves ... they're real big"'.

The film is set during the 2004–05 school year, as shown on Napoleon's student ID card in the title sequence. It has numerous culturally retroactive elements harking back to the 1970s, '80s, and '90s. For example, Deb wears a side ponytail and Napoleon wears Moon Boots, both popular fashion trends of the 1980s. One scene is set at a school dance that plays only 1980s music, such as Alphaville's "Forever Young". An earlier scene shows students performing a sign language rendition of "The Rose" (1980), originally popularized by Bette Midler (in the film, it is sung by studio session vocalist Darci Monet, who was never credited or paid any residuals for her work). Much of the technology in the film is also archaic; Napoleon uses a top-loader VCR and Walkman cassette player, Kip connects to the Internet via a pay-per-minute dial-up connection, and Uncle Rico drives a 1975 Dodge Tradesman. Napoleon dances to Jamiroquai's 1999 song "Canned Heat".

=== Opening sequence ===
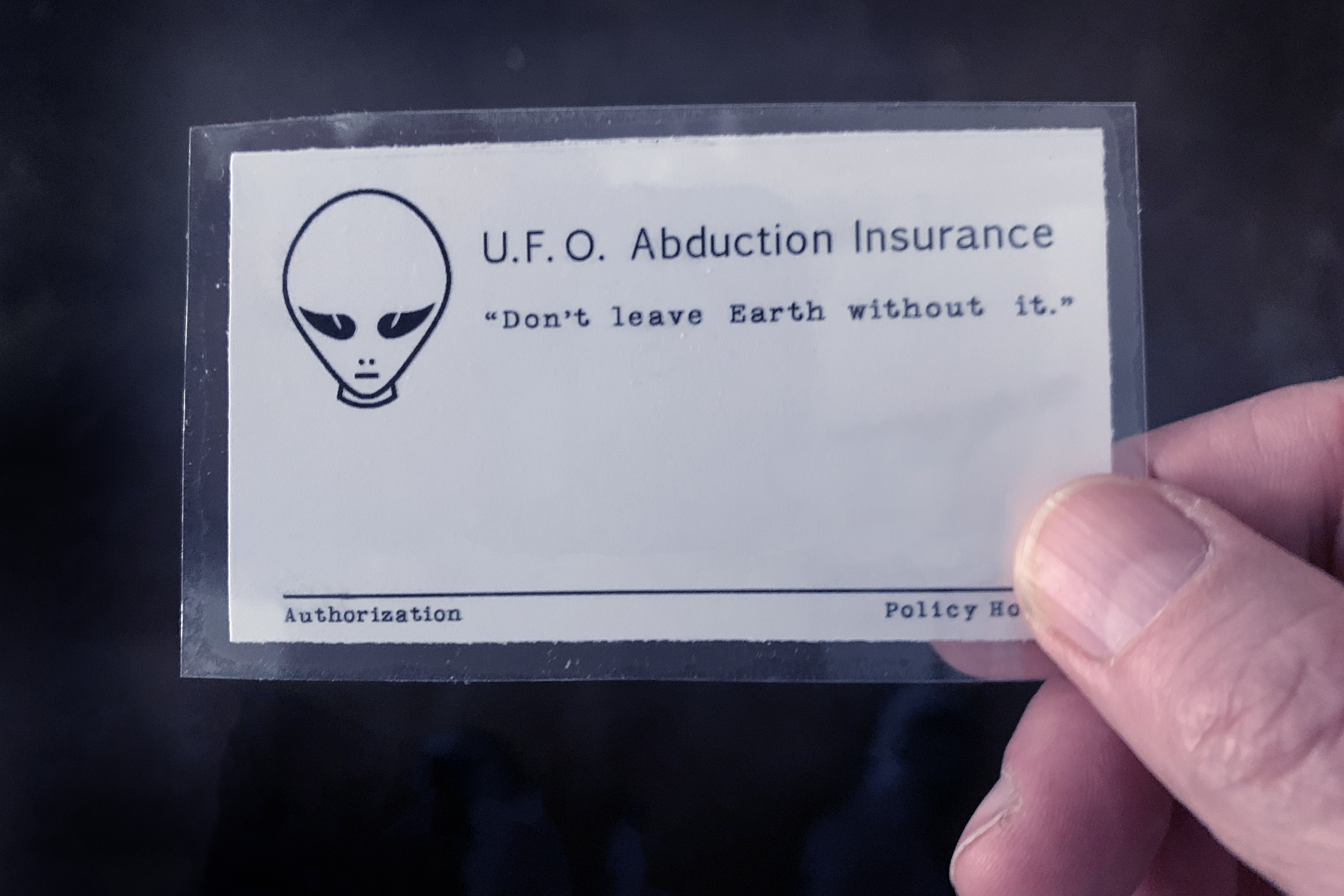
A replica of the UFO Abduction Insurance Card shown in the opening sequence.

The film was originally made without opening titles. Audiences at test screenings were confused about when the film was set. Eight months after the film was completed, the title sequence was filmed in cinematographer Munn Powell's basement. Ruell, who played Kip, suggested the idea of the title sequence. The sequence shows a pair of hands placing and removing several objects on a table. Objects like plates of food had credits written in condiments, while other objects like a Lemonheads box or a tube of ChapStick had credits printed on them. Hess said:

This question came up a few times and the Fox Searchlight marketing people were like, "maybe we could do something to say that this is happening now", because I kept explaining to them that I grew up in a small town in Idaho and that things are more, you know, functional, and fashion doesn't matter as much ... It's kind of weird, but because they wanted to show that the film takes place now, there's a title where a hand pulls Napoleon's school ID out of a wallet and it says "2004".

Of the studio's reaction to the sequence, Hess said:

We actually had Jon Heder placing all the objects in and out [of frame], and then showed it to Searchlight, who really liked it and thought it was great, but some lady over there was like, "There are some hangnails or something—the hands look kinda gross! It's really bothering me. Can we reshoot some of those? We'll send you guys a hand model." We were like, "WHAT?!". This, of course, was my first interaction with a studio at all, so they flew out a hand model a couple weeks later, who had great hands but was five or six shades darker than Jon Heder. So we reshot, but they're now intermixed, so if you look there are like three different dudes' hands (our producers are in there too). It all worked out great, though, and was a lot of fun.

=== Dance scene ===
The Hesses wrote the climactic dance scene because they knew Heder liked to dance. Heder said: "Jared's wife was like, 'Jon, I hear you're pretty good dancer. I've seen you boogie; it's pretty sweet.' And I was like, 'Well, I like to dabble.' I liked to mess around sometimes in front of friends and dance. But I did take pride in it. I won't be modest. I wasn't great but I did like to mess around ... Cut to two years later: after we had shot the short, they were like, 'Okay we're going to have you dancing in the movie as the climax. This is going to make or break the film.'"

The producers scheduled the dance scene toward the end of production. When the time came, they were low on money and had only one roll of film (about 10.5 minutes) left.

Heder said: "It was a lot of pressure. I was like, 'Oh, crap!' This isn't just a silly little scene. This is the moment where everything comes, and he's making the sacrifice for his friend. That's the whole theme of the movie. Everything leads up to this. Napoleon's been this loser. This has to be the moment where he lands a victory. He gets up there, and it's quiet: no reaction from the audience."

Heder improvised the dance, with some choreography help from Tina Majorino and moves from Saturday Night Fever, Michael Jackson, and Soul Train. "They were like, 'No, Jon, just figure it out.' So I just winged it. I danced three times and they took the best pieces from each of those."

"When you're shooting in independent film, you don't know what you're going to get the rights to", Heder said. "We thought Jamiroquai might be expensive. So we danced to three different songs—to that song and another Jamiroquai song, "Little L." We danced to Michael Jackson, something off of Off the Wall. Just those three. And then we got the rights to Jamiroquai. And I think that was half our budget."

=== Origin of the name "Napoleon Dynamite" ===
Upon the film's release, it was noted that the name "Napoleon Dynamite" had originally been used by musician Elvis Costello, most visibly on his 1986 album Blood & Chocolate, though he had used it on a B-side as early as 1982. Hess said he was unaware of Costello's use of the name until two days before the end of shooting, when he was informed by a teenage extra: "Had I known that name was used by anybody else prior to shooting the whole film, it definitely would have been changed ... I listen to hip-hop, dude. It's a pretty embarrassing coincidence." He said "Napoleon Dynamite" was the name of a man he met around 2000 on the streets of Cicero, Illinois, while doing missionary work for The Church of Jesus Christ of Latter-day Saints.

Costello believes Hess got the name from him, directly or indirectly. Costello said: "The guy just denies completely that I made the name up ... but I invented it. Maybe somebody told him the name and he truly feels that he came to it by chance. But it's two words that you're never going to hear together."

== Release ==
Napoleon Dynamite premiered at the Sundance Film Festival on January 17, 2004, and was picked up by Fox Searchlight Pictures. Shortly thereafter, Fox Searchlight collaborated with Paramount Pictures and MTV Films to release it, with Fox Searchlight handling North American distribution and Paramount and MTV distributing internationally. It was given a limited release in the United States on June 11, 2004, followed by wide release on August 27, 2004.

=== Anniversary screenings and 4K restoration ===
On June 9, 2014, the film was screened at Academy of Motion Picture Arts and Sciences in Los Angeles to celebrate its 10th anniversary. A bronze statue of Napoleon Dynamite, complete with tetherball, was placed in the 20th Century Fox studio lot.

A 20th-anniversary screening of the film took place at the 2024 Sundance Film Festival on January 24, 2024, to commemorate the festival's 20th anniversary, in the form of a new 4K restoration from the original 35mm negative produced by Searchlight Pictures and its parent company Walt Disney Studios under Hess's supervision. Hess said: "Returning to Sundance with Napoleon Dynamite feels like a homecoming. When it premiered at the festival 20 years ago, we never anticipated the incredible reaction it would receive ... It's always been a very personal film for Jerusha and me, so the love affair it's had with audiences all these years continues to delight us. To commemorate its 20th anniversary, we are thrilled to screen this newly restored version ... The restoration team did an amazing job bringing to life new details from the original film's negative that we'd never seen before. We can't wait to share it!" Hess and several cast members attended the 2024 screening. Efren Ramirez reprised part of Pedro's speech at the student assembly by saying: "I really don't have much to say. Have a happy Sundance."

=== Home media ===
Napoleon Dynamite was released on VHS and DVD on December 21, 2004, by 20th Century Fox Home Entertainment in North America and by Paramount Home Entertainment elsewhere. The DVD is double-sided, with full-screen and letterbox versions, plus Peluca and deleted scenes—all with audio commentary. A two-disc edition ("Like, the Best Special Edition, Ever!") was released in 2006 with additional deleted scenes, promotional material, and a second commentary track, but fell out of print in favor of the first edition DVD and the Blu-Ray.

The "10th Anniversary Edition" Blu-ray was released on June 2, 2014. A digital release of the 4K screening of the film is also available to purchase and stream.

=== Lawsuit against Fox Searchlight Pictures ===
On August 30, 2011, the film's production company, Napoleon Pictures, sued Fox Searchlight Pictures for $10 million for underreporting royalties and taking improper revenue deductions. In its term sheet, Fox agreed to pay 31.66% of net profits on home video. The lawsuit said that a 2008 audit revealed that Fox was paying only 9.66% and that there were underreported royalties and improper deductions.

Napoleon Pictures also alleged that Fox had breached the agreement in other ways, including underreporting pay television license fees, failing to report electronic sell-through revenue, charging residuals on home video sales, and overcharging residuals on home video sales, deducting a number of costs and charges Fox had no right to deduct or of which there is no documentation.

In May 2012, Fox went to trial after failing to win a summary judgment. The trial began on June 19, 2012. On November 28, Fox won on nine of the 11 issues, but Napoleon Pictures was awarded $150,000 based on Fox accounting irregularities.

== Reception ==
=== Box office ===
Despite a very limited initial release, Napoleon Dynamite was a commercial success. It had a budget of about $400,000 and grossed $44,940,956 in less than a year. It also spawned a slew of merchandise, from refrigerator magnets to T-shirts and Halloween costumes.

=== Critical response ===
On the review aggregator website Rotten Tomatoes, 72% of 175 critics' reviews are positive, with an average rating of 6.40/10. The website's consensus reads, "A charming, quirky, and often funny comedy." Metacritic, which uses a weighted average, assigned the film a score of 64 out of 100, based on 36 critics, indicating "generally favorable reviews".

Peter Travers of Rolling Stone magazine wrote: "Hess and his terrific cast—Heder is geek perfection—make their own kind of deadpan hilarity. You'll laugh till it hurts. Sweet." The Christian Science Monitor called the film "a refreshing new take on the overused teen-comedy genre" and said it "may not make you laugh out loud—it's too sly and subtle for that—but it will have you smiling every minute, and often grinning widely at its weirded-out charm."

Michael Atkinson of The Village Voice called the film "an epic, magisterially observed pastiche on all-American geekhood, flooring the competition with a petulant shove." In a mixed review, The New York Times praised Heder's performance and the "film's most interesting quality, which is its stubborn, confident, altogether weird individuality" but criticizing the film's resolution as coming "too easily." Roger Ebert of the Chicago Sun-Times gave the film one and a half stars, writing, "the movie makes no attempt to make [Napoleon] likable" and that it has "a kind of studied stupidity that sometimes passes as humor". Two Entertainment Weekly critics gave it grades of C and C−. But Entertainment Weekly ranked it 88th on its 2010 list of The 100 Greatest Characters of the Last 20 Years, writing, "A high school misfit found a sweet spot, tapping into our inner dork." The film was on several year-end lists. Rolling Stone ranked it 22nd of the 25 Top DVDs of 2004.

In 2025, it was one of the films voted for the "Readers' Choice" edition of The New York Times' list of "The 100 Best Movies of the 21st Century", finishing at number 196.

=== Awards ===
- Best Feature Film at the U.S. Comedy Arts Festival the same year. The film's budget was only $400,000. When the film rights were sold to a major distributor, Fox Searchlight Pictures, Fox supplied additional funds for the post-credits scene.
- In 2005, the film – itself an MTV Films production – won three MTV Movie Awards, for Breakthrough Male Performance, Best Musical Performance, and Best Movie. The film is #14 on Bravo's "100 Funniest Movies".
- It won the 2005 Golden Trailer Awards for Best Comedy.
- It won the 2005 Golden Satellite Award for Best Original Score (John Swihart).
- Four awards at the Teen Choice Awards. Choice Movie: Female Breakout Star for Haylie Duff, Choice Movie: Dance Scene, Choice Movie: Hissy Fit for Jon Heder, and Choice Movie: Comedy.
- The 2004 Film Discovery Jury Award for Best Feature
- April 2005, the Idaho Legislature approved a resolution commending the filmmakers for producing Napoleon Dynamite, specifically enumerating the benefits the movie has brought to Idaho, as well as for showcasing various aspects of Idaho's culture and economy.

== Future ==
=== Possible sequel ===
After nearly two decades of rumors, it was reported in September 2020 that a sequel to Napoleon Dynamite was in discussion. Heder said he was interested in a darker take on the characters, not rehashing the plot:

I feel like the future for Napoleon would be a lot more raw and edgy. So whatever he comes up with would be fun to explore, because I think whatever Jared comes up with wouldn't be your typical "Let's do a sequel where they all look the same and they all act the same." I think it would be an interesting development in their lives.

Ramirez improvised a script for a sequel in which Pedro is married to Summer Wheatly, has five kids, and owns a bakery, while Kip has fulfilled his dream to become a cage fighter and Rico has a new business he believes will make him rich.

In January 2023, Heder said he believed a sequel was "inevitable" and reiterated his interest in a darker tone. In October 2024, he again said a sequel was possible: "that the door's not closed yet."

=== Animated series ===
In April 2010, Fox announced that an animated series was in development, with the original cast reprising their roles. The series debuted on January 15, 2012. The Hesses and Mike Scully produced the show in association with 20th Century Fox Television. On May 14, 2012, it was announced that Fox had canceled the series after six episodes. The complete series was released on DVD on November 4, 2014, by Olive Films.

=== Related appearances ===
In 2016, Burger King produced a cheesy tots commercial featuring Heder and Ramirez as patrons.

For the film's 20th anniversary, Ore-Ida produced a commercial with Heder reprising the role of Napoleon, promoting "tot-protecting" pants.

On December 21, 2004, Heder appeared in character as Napoleon on Late Show With David Letterman to deliver the Top 10 list "Top Ten Signs You're Not The Most Popular Guy In Your High School."

== Legacy ==
The term "The Napoleon Dynamite Problem" has been used to describe researchers' inability to create algorithms to predict whether a particular viewer will like a film based on their ratings of previously viewed "quirky" films such as Napoleon Dynamite, Lost in Translation, and I Heart Huckabees. Other films compared to Napoleon Dynamite include Me and You and Everyone We Know, Moonrise Kingdom, and Sincerely Saul.

For several years, Preston held a "Napoleon Dynamite Festival" that included a tetherball tournament, tater tot eating contest, Moon Boot dance, impersonation, lookalike contest, and a football throwing contest. Fans continue to visit Preston, mostly as a side trip on the way to Yellowstone National Park.

The success of Napoleon Dynamite led to other films set in small towns, such as Little Miss Sunshine and Juno, that had similar critical, popular, and financial success.

Napoleon Dynamite has been credited with changing the way that the American Dream has been portrayed and bringing more realism to the otherwise often exaggerated genre.

== See also ==
- Napoleon Dynamite: The Game
