= List of horror films of 2019 =

This is a list of horror films that were released in 2019.

== Highest-grossing horror films of 2019 ==
Highest-grossing horror films of 2019
Rank	Title	Distributor	Worldwide gross
1	It Chapter Two	Warner Bros. Pictures	$473.1 million
2	Us	Universal Pictures	$256.1 million
3	Annabelle Comes Home	Warner Bros. Pictures	$231.3 million
4	Escape Room	Sony Pictures Releasing	$155.7 million
5	The Curse of La Llorona	Warner Bros. Pictures	$123.2 million
6	Pet Sematary	Paramount Pictures	$113 million
7	Scary Stories to Tell in the Dark	Lionsgate Films	$104.5 million
8	Crawl	Paramount Pictures	$91 million
9	Happy Death Day 2U	Universal Pictures	$64.6 million
10	Ma	Universal Pictures	$61.2 million

== 2019 horror films ==
Horror films released in 2019
Title	Director	Cast	Country	Notes
3 from Hell	Rob Zombie	Sheri Moon Zombie, Sid Haig, Bill Moseley	United States	
47 Meters Down: Uncaged	Johannes Roberts	Sophie Nélisse, Corinne Foxx, Brianne Tju, Sistine Stallone	United States; United Kingdom	
After Midnight	Jeremy Gardner, Christian Stella	Jeremy Gardner, Brea Grant, Henry Zebrowski, Justin Benson, Ashley Song, Nicola Masciotra, Keith Arbuthnot	United States	
Annabelle Comes Home	Gary Dauberman	Mckenna Grace, Madison Iseman, Katie Sarife	United States	
Aquaslash	Renaud Gauthier	Nicolas Fontaine, Brittany Drisdelle, Madelline Harvey, Lanisa Dawn, Paul Zinno, Nick Walker, Chip Chuipka	Canada	
Bit	Brad Michael Elmore	Nicole Maines, Diana Hopper, James Paxton	United States	
Black Christmas	Sophia Takal	Imogen Poots, Lily Donoghue, Aleyse Shannon, Brittany O’Grady	United States	
Bliss	Joe Begos	Dora Madison, Tru Collins, Jeremy Gardner	United States	
Brightburn	David Yarovesky	Elizabeth Banks, David Denman, Jackson A. Dunn	United States	
Blood Quantum	Jeff Barnaby	Michael Greyeyes, Elle-Máijá Tailfeathers, Forrest Goodluck	Canada	
Child's Play	Lars Klevberg	Aubrey Plaza, Gabriel Bateman, Brian Tyree Henry	United States	
The Cleansing Hour	Damien LeVeck	Ryan Guzman, Kyle Gallner, Alix Angelis	United States	
Color Out of Space	Richard Stanley	Nicolas Cage, Joely Richardson, Madeleine Arthur	United States	
Countdown	Justin Dec	Elizabeth Lail, Jordan Calloway, Talitha Bateman	United States	
Crawl	Alexandre Aja	Kaya Scodelario, Barry Pepper	United States	
Critters Attack!	Bobby Miller	Tashiana Washington, Dee Wallace	United States	
The Curse of La Llorona	Michael Chaves	Linda Cardellini, Roman Christou, Jaynee-Lynne Kinchen	United States	
Daniel Isn't Real	Adam Egypt Mortimer	Patrick Schwarzenegger, Miles Robbins, Sasha Lane	United States	
The Dead Center	Billy Senese	Shane Carruth, Poorna Jagannathan, Jeremy Childs	United States	
The Dead Don't Die	Jim Jarmusch	Bill Murray, Adam Driver, Tilda Swinton	United States	
The Dare	Giles Alderson	Bart Edwards, Richard Brake, Richard Short, Alexandra Evans, Robert Maaser	Bulgaria, United Kingdom, United States	
Dementer	Chad Crawford Kinkle	Katie Groshong, Stephanie Kinkle, Brandy Edmiston, Larry Fessenden	United States	
Doctor Sleep	Mike Flanagan	Ewan McGregor, Rebecca Ferguson, Kyliegh Curran	United States	
Don't Let Go	Jacob Aaron Estes	David Oyelowo, Storm Reid, Byron Mann	United States	
Earthquake Bird	Wash Westmoreland	Alicia Vikander, Riley Keough, Naoki Kobayashi	United States	
Eli	Ciarán Foy	Charlie Shotwell, Sadie Sink, Lili Taylor	United States	
Escape Room	Adam Robitel	Logan Miller, Deborah Ann Woll, Taylor Russell	United States	
Funhouse	Jason William Lee	Valter Skarsgård, Khamisa Wilsher, Gigi Saul Guerrero	Sweden, Canada	
Happy Death Day 2U	Christopher Landon	Jessica Rothe, Israel Broussard	United States	
Harpoon	Rob Grant	Munro Chambers, Emily Tyra, Christopher M. Gray	Canada	
Haunt	Scott Beck, Bryan Woods	Katie Stevens, Will Brittain, Lauryn McClain	United States	
Hell House LLC III: Lake of Fire	Stephen Cognetti	Gabriel Chytry, Elizabeth Vermilyea, Sam Kazzi	United States	
The Hole in the Ground	Lee Cronin	Seána Kerslake, James Cosmo, Simone Kerby	Belgium; Finland; Ireland; United Kingdom	
Insomnium	Scott Powers	Brad Pennington, Clint Browning, Gena Shaw	United States	
In the Tall Grass	Vincenzo Natali	Laysla De Oliveira, Avery Whitted, Will Buie Jr., Patrick Wilson	Canada	
I See You	Adam Randall	Helen Hunt, Jon Tenney, Owen Teague	United States	
The Intruder	Deon Taylor	Michael Ealy, Meagan Good, Joseph Sikora	United States	
Impetigore	Joko Anwar		Indonesia	
It Chapter 2	Andy Muschietti	Jessica Chastain, James McAvoy, Bill Hader	United States	
K-12	Melanie Martinez, Alissa Torvinen	Melanie Martinez, Emma Harvey, Zión Moreno	United States	
Killer Sofa	Bernie Rao		New Zealand	
Knives and Skin	Jennifer Reeder	Raven Whitley, Ty Olwin, Marika Engelhardt	United States	
The Lighthouse	Robert Eggers	Willem Dafoe, Robert Pattinson	United States	
Little Monsters	Abe Forsythe	Lupita Nyong'o, Alexander England, Josh Gad, Kat Stewart	United States	
The Lodge	Severin Fiala, Veronika Franz	Riley Keough, Jaeden Martell, Lia McHugh	United States	
Ma	Tate Taylor	Octavia Spencer, Juliette Lewis, Diana Silvers	United States	
Mary	Michael Goi	Gary Oldman, Emily Mortimer, Manuel Garcia-Rulfo, Stefanie Scott	United States	
Midsommar	Ari Aster	Florence Pugh, Jack Reynor, William Jackson Harper	United States; Sweden	
The Perfection	Richard Shepard	Allison Williams, Logan Browning, Steven Weber	United States	
Pet Sematary	Kevin Kölsch, Dennis Widmyer	Jason Clarke, Amy Seimetz, John Lithgow	United States	
The Platform	Galder Gaztelu-Urrutia	Ivan Massagué, Zorion Eguileor, Antonia San Juan	Spain	
Polaroid	Lars Klevberg	Kathryn Prescott, Samantha Logan, Tyler Young, Javier Botet, Mitch Pileggi	United States	
The Prodigy	Nicholas McCarthy	Taylor Schilling, Jackson Robert Scott, Colm Feore	United States	
Rabid	Jen Soska, Sylvia Soska	Laura Vandervoort, Ben Hollingsworth, Phil Brooks	Canada	
Ready or Not	Matt Bettinelli-Olpin, Tyler Gillett	Samara Weaving, Adam Brody, Mark O'Brien	United States	
Ring Ring	Adam Marino	Kirby Bliss Blanton, Lou Ferrigno, Malcolm Goodwin, Tommy Kijas, Josh Zuckerman, Alex Shaffer	United States	
The Russian Bride	Michael S. Ojeda	Corbin Bernsen, Oksana Orlan, Kristina Pimenova	United States	
Saint Maud	Rose Glass	Morfydd Clark, Jennifer Ehle	United Kingdom	
Scary Stories to Tell in the Dark	André Øvredal	Zoe Colletti, Michael Garza, Gabriel Rush	United States; Canada	
Sebastina: The Curse	Augusto Tamayo San Román	Silvana Cañote, Luciana Blomberg, Alicia Mercado, Andrea Luna, Paola Nanino, André Silva, Stefano Salvini, Diego Carlos Seyfarth, Gianfranco Brero, Bertha Pancorvo, Valentina Saba, Katerina D'Onofrio, Germán Gonzales, Lula Toledo	Peru	
Silver Stars on Red Velvet	RJ Cusyk	Max Caudell, Laura Sharlotte, Michael Lakota Dillon	United States	
Synchronic	Justin Benson, Aaron Moorhead	Anthony Mackie, Jamie Dornan	United States	
Sweetheart	J. D. Dillard	Kiersey Clemons, Emory Cohen, Hanna Mangan-Lawrence	United States	
Unknown Visitor	Isaac Rodriguez	Brittany Dunk, June Griffin Garcia, Jason Scarbrough	United States	
Us	Jordan Peele	Lupita Nyong'o, Winston Duke	United States	
Velvet Buzzsaw	Dan Gilroy	Jake Gyllenhaal, Rene Russo	United States	
Villains	Dan Berk, Robert Olsen	Bill Skarsgård, Maika Monroe, Blake Baumgartner, Jeffrey Donovan, Kyra Sedgwick	United States	
Vivarium	Lorcan Finnegan	Imogen Poots, Jesse Eisenberg	Ireland, Denmark, Belgium	
Wounds	Babak Anvari	Armie Hammer, Dakota Johnson, Zazie Beetz	United States; United Kingdom	
Z	Brandon Christensen	Keegan Connor Tracy, Jett Klyne, Sean Rogerson	Canada	
