= Daniel Eric Gold =

American actor (born 1975)

- Born: September 19, 1975 (age 50); Los Angeles, California, U.S.
- Occupation: Actor
- Years active: 1999–present

Daniel Eric Gold (born September 19, 1975 in Los Angeles, California) is an American actor. He attended Lee Strasberg's Theater Institute as a teenager, and went on to graduate from Penn State in 1996, with a degree in Theater Arts.

== Career ==
=== Theater ===
Gold moved to Chicago after college, where he performed as Michael in Jean Cocteau's Indescretions, in Oak Park Festivals' production of Much Ado About Nothing, and in Patrick Marber's Dealer's Choice. In May 1998, he landed the part of Ste in Jonathan Harvey's coming of age play Beautiful Thing at The Famous Door Theater in Chicago. The play's success there brought the whole cast to the Cherry Lane Theatre in New York, where it opened to rave reviews in February 1999.

Since moving to the West Village in 2000, Gold has played several theater roles. For Craig Lucas, he performed in This Thing of Darkness at the Atlantic Theater, A Small Tragedy and a role written especially for him in The Singing Forest. He performed in Loot and Singing Forest for the regional theater Intiman in Seattle.

He is a 2004 nominee for the Lucille Lortel Award for acting in Lucas' Obie Award-winning play, Small Tragedy. In June 2005, Gold was in Roundabout's The Paris Letter with John Glover and Ron Rifkin. That role was followed by Eric Bogosian's subUrbia.

=== Film and television ===
Film roles include War of the Worlds with Tom Cruise, Charlie Wilson's War with Tom Hanks, Definitely, Maybe with Ryan Reynolds, Birds of America again for Craig Lucas, and Spinning into Butter with Sarah Jessica Parker. Other roles include Ang Lee's Taking Woodstock and Last Night with Keira Knightley.

In 2009, Gold made his TV debut in Ugly Betty as Matt Hartley, the love interest for the title character, played by America Ferrera.

Gold was in the independent film Café in Philadelphia, with Jennifer Love Hewitt and Jamie Kennedy.

He also appears in national commercials for McDonald's and AFLAC.

== Personal life ==
Gold lives in Brooklyn. He is of English and Jewish descent.

== Theatre ==
Off-Broadway
Year	Title	Role	Venue
1999	Beautiful Thing	Ste	Cherry Lane Theatre
2002	This Thing of Darkness	Donald/Reef	Linda Gross Theater
2004	Small Tragedy	Christmas	Playwrights Horizons
2005	The Paris Letter	Sam Arlen/Young Sandy	Laura Pels Theatre (current)
2006	subUrbia	Jeff	Second Stage Theatre
2008	Len, Asleep in Vinyl	Max	McGinn-Cazale Theatre

== Filmography ==
=== Film ===
Year	Title	Role	Notes
2005	War of the Worlds	Conspiracy buff	
2007	Charlie Wilson's War	Donnelly	
2008	Birds of America	Gary	
2008	Definitely, Maybe	Charlie	
2008	Spinning into Butter	Nathan	
2009	Taking Woodstock	Joel Rosenman	
2010	Harvest	Seth Winters	
2010	Last Night	Andy	
2010	Café	Todd	
2012	Hello I Must Be Going	Noah	
2016	Hacker	Sye	
2017	The Outcasts	Mr Samuels	
2023	The Magnificent Meyersons	Daniel Meyerson	

=== Television ===
Year	Title	Role	Notes
2005	Law & Order: Trial by Jury	Nick	Episode: "Bang & Blame"
2005	Law & Order	David "D" Glass	Episode: "Flaw"
2009–2010	Ugly Betty	Matt Hartley	Recurring (season 3); main cast (season 4); 20 episodes
2010	Law & Order	Alex Conway	Episode: "Brilliant Disguise"
2012	Christmas with Holly	Alex Nagle	Television film
2012	Girls	Jessa's ex-boyfriend	Episode: "Hard Being Easy"
2013	Blue Bloods	Grady	Episode: "Lost and Found"
2016	Good Girls Revolt	Sam	Recurring
2017	The Blacklist	Robert Dahle	Episode: "The Apothecary"
2017	Chicago Fire	Mark Blakeslee	Episodes: "My Miracle", "Sixty Days"
2018	Titans	Bill	Episodes: "Harvest"
2020	Group	Henry	7 episodes

== Awards and nominations ==
Year	Award	Nominated work	Result
2003–2004	Obie Award for Outstanding Performance	Small Tragedy	Won
2004	Lucille Lortel Award for Outstanding Featured Actor	Small Tragedy	Nominated
