= Peter Førde =

Norwegian actor

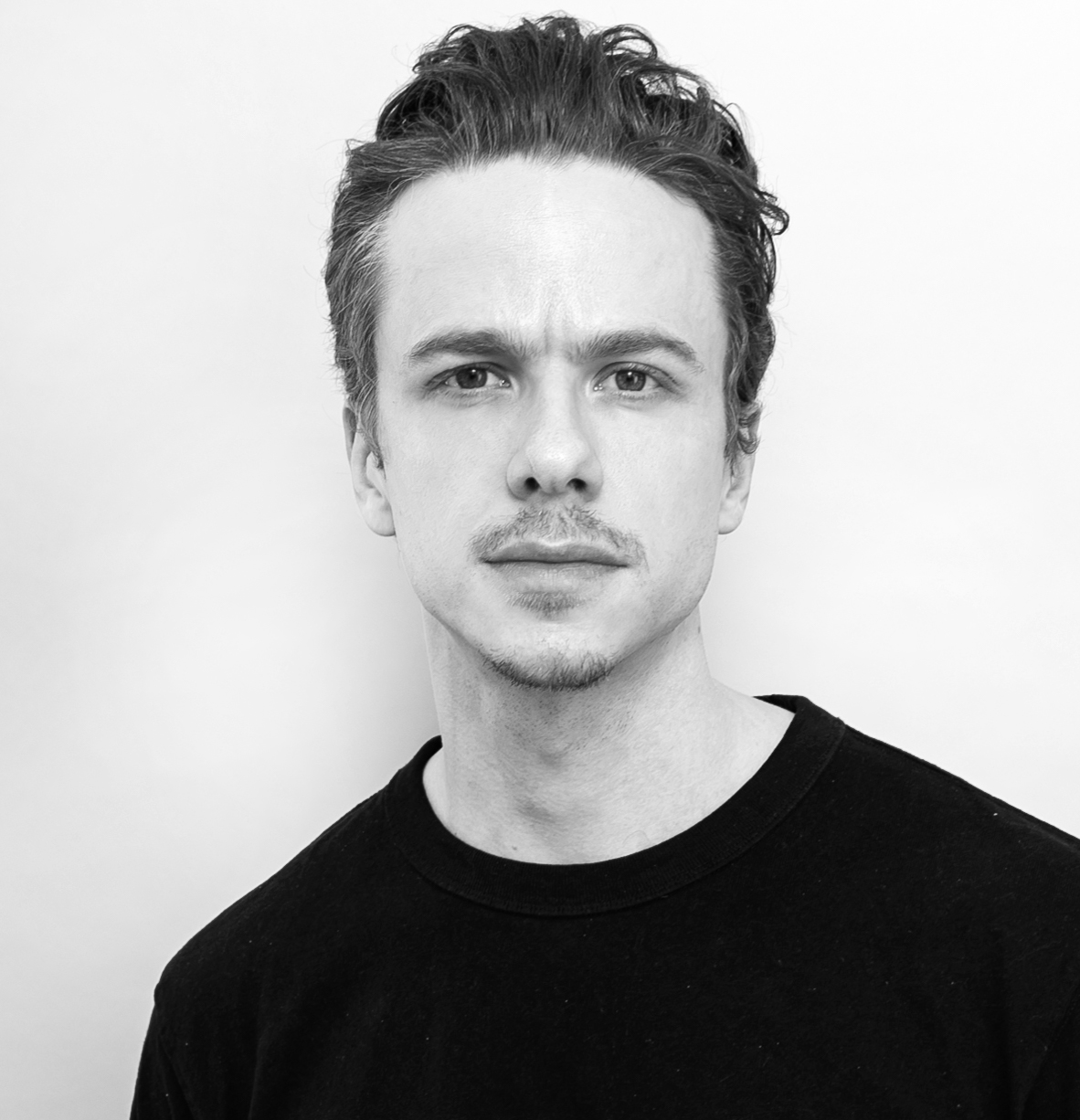
- Peter Førde (2022)
- Born: 16 June 1988 (age 37); Førde, Norway
- Education: Romerike Folk High School (2008–09); Lee Strasberg Theatre and Film Institute (2010–13)
- Occupation: actor
- Website: IMDb

Peter Førde (born 16 June 1988) is a Norwegian actor. He began acting on stage in his early teens, working on several shorts and indie films before making his feature film debut in The Tunnel in 2019. He is known for his roles in a number of films and TV series, including Føkkings Fladseth and State of Happiness.

== Early life and education ==
Førde started his acting career at Teater Vestland in his early teens. He worked on stage throughout his high school years and, after graduating, went on to study acting at Romerike Folk High School (2008–09). He moved to New York in 2010 to attend The Lee Strasberg Theatre and Film Institute, graduating in 2013. He later went on to study the Meisner technique at the Maggie Flanigan Studio.

He was based in New York in the years 2010 – 2023, and since 2023 he divides his time between Oslo and New York.

== Career ==
In the years after graduating from Strasberg, Førde played leading roles in a number of short films (like Library of God), independent feature films (like Know Nothins), as well as acting on stage in Norway.

In the winter of 2019, he was contacted by a Norwegian casting director and invited to audition for the supporting role of "Kurt" in the Norwegian feature film The Tunnel. He booked the role and flew to Norway less than a week later to begin shooting. The movie premiered nationwide in theatres in Norway on December 25, 2019, and won several awards and nominations.

In the years 2021 and 2022, he starred in several feature films such as Nightmare (directed by Kjersti Helen Rasmussen) and Leave (directed by Alex Herron), as well as in the Discovery+ series Everything you love (directed by Stian Kristiansen).

In 2023, he was cast in the comedy series Føkkings Fladseth, where he played the supporting role of "Jarlen", an up-and-coming stand-up comedian with a drug problem. The series premiered on TV2 in November 2023 and won the Gullruten award for Best Comedy in 2024.

In the fall of 2023, it was announced that he would star in the third season of the award-winning drama series State of Happiness, portraying the character "Bjørklund", a deep sea diver. The series was shot on location in Stavanger and Belgium during 2023, and is set to premiere on NRK in October 2024.

== Filmography ==
=== Film ===
Year	Title	Role	Notes
2013	Absolute Threshold	Marc	Short film
2015	Craig	Craig	Short film
2018	Know Nothins	Maddox Pryor	
2019	Library of God	Knut-Ronny	Short film
2019	The Tunnel	Kurt	
2022	Leave	Hotel receptionist	
2022	Nightmare	Martin	

=== Television ===
Year	Title	Role	Notes
2022	Everything you love	Alfahan	
2023	Føkkings Fladseth	Jarlen	
2024	State of Happiness	Bjørklund	(season 3)
