= The Dare (film) =

2019 film directed by Giles Alderson

- Theatrical release poster
- Directed by: Giles Alderson
- Written by: Giles Alderson; Jonny Grant
- Produced by: Yariv Lerner; Julian Kostov
- Starring: Bart Edwards; Richard Brake; Richard Short; Alexandra Evans; Robert Maaser
- Cinematography: Andrew Googer
- Edited by: Oliver Parker
- Music by: Mario Grigorov
- Production companies: B2Y Productions; JupiterLights Pictures; Nu Boyana Film Studios
- Distributed by: Entertainment Squad; Millennium Media; The Horror Collective
- Release date: December 20, 2019 (Netherlands)
- Running time: 97 minutes
- Countries: Bulgaria; United Kingdom; United States
- Language: English
- Box office: $3 millions (in Netherlands, estimate)

The Dare is a 2019 horror film directed by Giles Alderson starring Bart Edwards, Richard Brake, Richard Short, Alexandra Evans, and Robert Maaser.

== Premise ==
After having his house invaded at night when he was with his family, Jay is transported to a basement with three other prisoners.

== Cast ==
- Bart Edwards as Jay Jackson
- Richard Brake as Credence
- Richard Short as Adam Heinze
- Alexandra Evans as Kat Gill
- Robert Maaser as Dominic Craven
- Mitchell Norman as Young Dominic
- Harry Jarvis as Teen Dominic
- Daniel Schutzmann as Paul Anderson
- Devora Wilde as Jess Jackson
- Oliver Cunliffe as Young Jay
- Alexander Biehn as Young Adam
- George Pilsworth as Young Paul
- Maddy Bryan as Young Kat
- Lelia Yvetta as Poppy Jackson
- Emily Haigh as Molly Jackson
- Ethan Hazzard as Issac
- Flynn Matthews as Josh
- Annabelle Pinkston as Young Molly
- Samantha Fries as Young Poppy

== Production ==
Giles Alderson reshot the film's ending after it performed well at film festivals and secured more distribution deals. He described the alternate ending as "british".

== Reception ==
On the review aggregator website Rotten Tomatoes, 44% of 9 critics' reviews are positive.

On Film Threat, Norman Gidney scored the film an 8 out of 10 writing in his review consensus section: "where were Giles and Grant when ideas for the reboot of Saw were being thrown around?" Writing for Starburst, Jacob Walker said that "despite the holes in some of the logic of the story, it ends up fitting together quite well, the acting is decent, and the gore is well handled."

== See also ==
- List of American films of 2019
- List of horror films of 2019
