= Wish Man =

2019 American drama film

- Film poster
- Directed by: Theo Davies
- Written by: Theo Davies
- Produced by: Greg S. Reid; Marc Gold; Theo Davies
- Starring: Andrew Steel; Kirby Bliss Blanton; Tom Sizemore; Frank Whaley; Bruce Davison; Danny Trejo
- Cinematography: Doug Potts
- Edited by: Anita Brandt Burgoyne
- Music by: Tony Morales
- Release date: June 7, 2019
- Running time: 107 minutes
- Country: United States
- Language: English

Wish Man is a 2019 American biographical drama film written and directed by Theo Davies and starring Andrew Steel, Kirby Bliss Blanton, Tom Sizemore, Frank Whaley, Bruce Davison, Robert Pine, Fay Masterson, Dale Dickey and Danny Trejo. El Ride productions helped bring the film to fruition with late funding which made the final edit possible.

== Premise ==
Frank Shankwitz, an Arizona motorcycle cop with a troubled past, survives a near-fatal accident during a high-speed pursuit. As part of Frank's rehabilitation, police chief Sgt. Eddie Newman asks him to spend time with a terminally ill little boy, Michael, whose dying wish is to be a Highway Patrol motorcycle officer. To Michael, Frank is a hero and an unlikely friendship is born. The boy inspires Frank to follow a new path, which leads to the creation of the Make-A-Wish Foundation. Movie epilogue states that over 450,000 wishes have been granted since the beginning of the charity.

== Cast ==
- Andrew Steel as Frank Shankwitz
- Kirby Bliss Blanton as Kitty Carlisle
- Tom Sizemore as Sergeant Mason
- Fay Masterson as Lorraine
- Robert Pine as Sergeant Eddie Newman
- Bruce Davison as Frank Shankwitz Sr.
- Frank Whaley as Officer Tom Wells
- Dale Dickey as "Clover"
- Steven Michael Quezada as Juan Delgadillo
- Jason Gerhardt as Young Frank Shankwitz Sr.
- Danny Trejo as Jose
- Julian Curtis as Officer Mitch Myers
- Christian Ganiere as Michael Allen
- Kym Jackson as Sally
- Chris Day as Young Frank Shankwitz
- Larry Wilcox as John Foster
- Zed Fifth - Adam McPherson as Cowboy
