= Delirious (2006 film) =

- Directed by: Tom DiCillo
- Written by: Tom DiCillo
- Produced by: Robert Salerno
- Starring: Steve Buscemi; Michael Pitt; Alison Lohman; Gina Gershon; Callie Thorne; Kevin Corrigan; Richard Short
- Cinematography: Frank G. DeMarco
- Edited by: Paul Zucker
- Music by: Anton Sanko
- Production companies: Thelma Productions; Artina Films
- Distributed by: Peace Arch Entertainment
- Release dates: September 26, 2006 (San Sebastián Film Festival); August 15, 2007 (United States)
- Running time: 107 minutes
- Countries: United Kingdom; United States; Canada
- Language: English
- Box office: $659,589

Delirious is a 2006 comedy-drama film directed by Tom DiCillo that stars Steve Buscemi, Michael Pitt and Alison Lohman.

The film tells the story of twenty-year-old Toby Grace (Michael Pitt) who progresses from a homeless scavenger in New York City to the assistant of a neurotic paparazzo, Les Galantine (Steve Buscemi), then falls in love with a famous singer, K'harma.

== Plot ==
Toby, a young homeless man, and paparazzo Les meet when Toby interrupts a crowd of paparazzi waiting to take pictures of pop diva K'harma Leeds (Allison Lohman). Toby volunteers to go get coffee for Les and two of his colleagues. On his way back with the coffee, Toby is stopped by K'harma's agent from inside the building and asked to see if the photographers are looking. When he confirms that the photographers are looking away, the agent guide K'harma past Toby towards a car. The photographers catch on and rush the car, colliding with Toby and spilling the coffee he is carrying. Later that night, Toby approaches Les outside his apartment, scaring him. He claims that he was bringing his change back from the coffee run, but eventually admits he is homeless and asks to stay with him that night. Les relents, and the next day, Toby offers to be his assistant for free, and Les accepts.

While being thrown out of a party that night, Les and Toby overhear a celebrity's agent mention his client Chuck Sirlon's upcoming penile surgery. Toby writes down the address, and they show up there the next day. After waiting for quite some time, Les gets a shot of Sirloin which ge refers to as "the shot heard 'round the world", although he only gets $700 for it. Les brings Toby to his parents' home for dinner, where he sees them ridicule Les for his work, which they consider to be tawdry and him a disappointment.

Toby consoles Les and Les offers to take Toby's headshots free of charge to help him work toward his dream of being an actor. However, their partnership shows signs of distress after K'harma takes Toby backstage without Les, angering the latter. The next day, at Les' apartment, Toby gets a call from K'harma, who invites him to her birthday party. Toby agrees on the condition that he can bring Les along, making it up to him.

At the party, Les breaks his promise to Toby not to take paparazzi shots and photographs K'harma with Elvis Costello, getting him and Toby thrown out. Toby is extremely angry at Les, who feigns dropping his camera's memory card into a cup of coffee (unbeknownst to Toby, Les ejects his camera's battery instead) and offers to print Toby's headshots and show them to casting agents. The next day, Toby says his stomach hurts and that he cannot go with Les. After Les is gone, Toby tries to leave, only to find that Les has locked him in. He accesses Les's computer and discovers the pictures of K'harma and Elvis Costello from the party. Feeling betrayed, Toby escapes by unhinging the apartment door.

Some time later, Toby has become a flourishing actor. Les repeatedly tries to contact Toby through his agent until Toby finally speaks to him. Les offers to apologize over coffee, but Toby declines. Toby professes his love for K'harma on film, which skyrockets his popularity.

At home, the jealous Les comes across a vintage camera his father gave him with a concealed gun inside, and resolves to murder Toby with it. At a red carpet premiere, as Toby walks down the red carpet with K'harma, Les raises the camera and prepares to shoot him, but sees him kissing K'harma and stops. As he leaves, Toby sees him and calls him back. They shake hands, and Les takes a closeup shot of the smiling Toby. Les urges Toby to go, and Toby walks down the red carpet into the premiere with K'harma at his side. Les, although disappointed that recognition still eludes him, is happy for Toby.

After the credits, Les is shown on an entertainment news show discussing his picture of Toby, which the interviewer refers to as "the shot heard 'round the world".

== Cast ==
- Steve Buscemi as Les Galantine
- Michael Pitt as Toby Grace
- Alison Lohman as K'Harma Leeds
- Gina Gershon as Dana
- Callie Thorne as Gabi
- Kevin Corrigan as Ricco
- Richard Short as Jace Hipley
- Elvis Costello as Himself
- David Wain as Byron
- Mel Gorham as Tish
- Peter Appel as Feldman
- Cinqué Lee as Corey
- Kevin Phillips as Blaine
- Rodrigo Lopresti as Demo
- Melissa Rauch as Megan
- Dennis Parlato as Royce Ralston
- Jeff Branson as TV Soap Star
- Amy Hargreaves as Nikki Blake
- Juani Feliz as Staci from Queens
- Jack Gwaltney as Chuck Sirloin
- Kristina Klebe as Kris, Swedish Nurse
- Phillip Bloch as Himself
- Tobias Truvillion as Silky
- Tom Aldredge as Carl Galantine, Les's Father
- Doris Belack as Les's Mother
- Lynn Cohen as Muffy Morrison
- Joseph D'Onofrio as Vince (as Joe D'Onofrio)
- Kristen Schaal as Joelle
- Marcus Collins as Marcus
- Minnie Driver as Herself (uncredited)
- Ronald Guttman as Restaurant Manager (uncredited)

== Reception ==
The film received generally positive reviews from critics. On the website Rotten Tomatoes, the film has an 83% approval rating, based on 63 reviews, with an average rating of 6.75/10. The website's consensus reads, "A funny, energetic satire of the paparazzi life and the entertainment industry, Delirious is another winner for indie helmer Tom DiCillo." On the website Metacritic, the film has a score of 68 out of 100, based on 22 critic reviews, indicating "generally favorable reviews". On DVD Talk, film critic David Walker wrote, "Delirious is an entertaining film that deserves more attention than it got theatrically."
