= Hacker (film) =

- Directed by: Akan Satayev
- Starring: Callan McAuliffe; Lorraine Nicholson; Daniel Eric Gold; Clifton Collins Jr.; Zachary Bennett
- Release date: December 2, 2016
- Running time: 107 minutes
- Language: English
- Box office: $12.4 million

Hacker (theatrically released as Anonymous) is a 2016 crime thriller, directed by Akan Satayev, about a group of young hackers who got involved with an online crime group and black market dealers across Toronto, Hong Kong, New York, and Bangkok. The cast consisted of Callan McAuliffe, Lorraine Nicholson, Daniel Eric Gold, and Clifton Collins Jr. The story was loosely based on real events. The screenplay was written by Timur Zhaxylykov and Sanzhar Sultan, who also produced in association with Brillstein Entertainment Partners. The film had a limited release in the US (under the title Anonymous), on December 2, 2016. Following that, Sony Pictures released the film on home entertainment.

== Plot ==
As a family of immigrants who moved to Canada, the Danyliuk's subsequently struggle for money and have to live on welfare.

Alex grew up with no friends and spent his time online, playing games. He later started making money as a "Clicker" by generating online traffic to earn revenue for websites.

He eventually leaves home to live in Toronto to attend college. To make extra money to support himself, Alex turns to a life of crime and identity theft, with the help of Sye, a street-wise hustler who introduces him to the world of black market trading. They start with lost and stolen credit cards and fake transactions. Alex gets caught trying to defraud the International Bank of Canada, the bank that fired his mom, and persuades Curtis, the bank's Head of Security, by making a deal of fixing their unsecure site and computers for free, in exchange of letting him and Sye go.

What Alex did was leaked to the Dark Web. He received a lot of praises from other members of the Dark Web for what he did, because it was unusual to hack a bank by physically visiting it. This act caught the attention of Zed, a mysterious masked figure, who's known as the head of the Dark Web.

Alex meets Kira, a young female hacker, who he met after Sye used his laptop to talk to her and asks to meet up. Through Sye's suggestion, Alex asks Kira to join him and Sye. Kira introduced them to a lot more ways to earn money by printing their own credit cards (through the credit card machine brought by Kira) and using Bitcoin. The three of them start earning more money. Sye gets suspicious of the way Kira is working, saying that they do not know who Kira's customers are and where she gets them from. Kira suggests to Alex that they relocate to Hong Kong, where people like her and Alex belong, and Sye can stay in Canada if he wants to. Alex says he can't just leave Sye behind but did not answer when Kira tells him to think about it.

While Kira is in the middle of a deal she had set up, Sye is once again questioning her customers, telling Alex that it's suspicious of them to buy a whole truck of their goods. Nearing the end of the deal, Kira calls Alex to sign the papers. Before Alex could sign, Sye tells Kira's customers that they can buy any amount they want and that they do not have to buy everything right now. Kira disagrees with Sye, saying that their deal is to buy everything in the truck or they will have to find a new buyer. Sye and Kira gets into a heated argument causing one of the customers to fire their gun into the air. The customer said no deal will be done ever, and if they get in touch with anyone they know they won't be as pleasant as they were that day.

This incident pushes them relocate to Hong Kong. Having no track of all of the credit cards they use, they don't know if a card is still working or not. If the card they used in a shop is not working anymore, the system will detect it triggering a 'pick up' message. This means that the card is stolen which will prompt the seller to call the cops. One night, after a failed transaction due to an expired card, they go home frustrated but Sye suggests for them to have a celebration because it is his birthday. The three of them go to a nightclub where Sye gets into a fight with both Sye and Alex ending up in jail. After some time, they were freed and sees Kira outside the prison, who seemed to bail them out. When asks what happened, Kira just answers with 'my uncle.' As an apology to what happened, Sye got them money using an old card they got from a Colombian banker, which Alex had asked him not to use ever again. Alex got angry causing him to ask Sye to leave.

Alex and Kira go around all the ATM's in Hong Kong withdrawing a total of $2.3 million leaving Darkweb calling cards behind after every transaction. Kira wants to retire, but Alex wants to continue. This operation was reported to the news and got Zed's attention. Zed contacts him, and Alex arranges to meet him in person. They meet in an old factory, and are surprised to find Zed in a wheelchair and with a heavily burned face. Alex and Kira agree to do a mission for Zed, who explains that failure of this mission will cost their and their families' lives.

Sye returns to Hong Kong, and makes contact with Alex from their hotel, but the Colombian banker's men get to the hotel first, killing Sye before Alex and Kira can return. Alex and Kira continue with the agreed deal with Zed to crash the stock market. On the way to the Federal Reserve, the Chairman of the Federal Reserve was shot, causing the markets to panic and crash. Alex and Kira's mission was to publish the pre-written articles about the assassination online so it will be reported before the stock market closes, with Zed getting a lot of money. It later becomes apparent that he was an imposter and the assassination was faked.

While getting in the car, Alex and Kira were held at gunpoint. Alex is shown to be in an abandoned office with his head covered with a black cloth and is accompanied by two men. One of them receives a call who then proceeded to inject a liquid to Alex.

After Alex regains consciousness, he decided to get on a flight to Bangkok, Thailand, where Kira said to meet if anything goes wrong, but she doesn't show up. Alex went to an internet cafe to know what happened after their operation with Zed, learning of Zed's apparent arrest and Kira's death. Before he could visit Kira's Mobli website to check for any hidden message Kira might have left for him, his card triggered a pick up call causing the police come in and arrest him. Alex was then sent to jail.

After spending 2 years in jail, he is finally freed through the Royal Pardon. At the gates of the prison on the day of his release, he is met by Kira. Alex asks her why she's there. Kira finally explains the whole story, revealing that she has been part of a deal she made with the FBI working as an agent to catch Zed. They both drive off together.

== Cast ==
- Callan McAuliffe as Alex
  - Aiden Besu as 6-year-old Alex
  - Rian Michelsen as 13-year-old Alex
- Lorraine Nicholson as Kira
- Daniel Eric Gold as Sye
- Clifton Collins Jr. as Zed
- Zachary Bennett as Curtis head of Bank Security
- Vlada Verevko as Alex's Mother
- Genadijs Dolganovs as Alex's Father
- Kristian Truelsen as Federal Reserve Chairman
- Greg Hovanessian as Randy Bickle
- Allyson Pratt as Robin the Stripper
- James Cade as Chris
- Darryl Flatman as Tommy
