= My Dog Tulip =

- Directed by: Paul Fierlinger; Sandra Fierlinger
- Written by: Paul Fierlinger; Sandra Fierlinger
- Based on: My Dog Tulip by J. R. Ackerley
- Produced by: Howard Kaminsky; Frank Pellegrino; Norman Twain
- Starring: Christopher Plummer; Lynn Redgrave; Isabella Rossellini; Brian Murray; Paul Hecht; Euan Morton
- Edited by: Paul Fierlinger
- Music by: John Avarese
- Production company: Norman Twain Productions
- Distributed by: New Yorker Films
- Release date: June 10, 2009 (Annecy)
- Running time: 83 minutes
- Country: United States
- Language: English
- Box office: $246,574

My Dog Tulip is a 2009 American animated drama film based on the 1956 memoir of the same name by J. R. Ackerley, BBC editor, novelist and memoirist. The film tells the story of Ackerley's fifteen-year relationship with his Alsatian dog (German Shepherd) Queenie, who had been renamed Tulip for the book. The film – geared toward an adult audience – was written, animated and directed by Paul Fierlinger and his wife, Sandra Fierlinger.

Christopher Plummer narrated Ackerley's voice, Isabella Rossellini provided the voice of the veterinarian, and Lynn Redgrave provided the voice (in her last film performance) of Ackerley's sister Nancy.

The film premiered at the Annecy International Animated Film Festival on June 10, 2009 and received Honourable Mention for Best Animated Film at the 2009 Ottawa International Animation Festival. The film won Grand Prix – best feature film award at the World Festival of Animated Film Zagreb – Animafest Zagreb in 2011.

As with the original book, the film gives detailed descriptions of the dog's bowel movements and sex life – received as "positively juvenile" and helping the film achieve realism and avoid anthropomorphism.

In 1988, Colin Gregg had filmed Ackerley's We Think the World of You (1960) – also about Ackerley's relationship with his dog Queenie.

== Animation ==
Fierlinger and his wife divided the film into fourteen sections, making it over a two and a half year period using TVPaint, a French, bitmap-based digital animation software package. No paper was used in the production.

The film alternates between several animation styles: fully rendered scenes, simple drawings, black and white line illustrations and quick notepad sketches.

The Fierlingers drew and painted about 60,000 drawings for the film, which comprises about 460 scenes and about 600 individual background paintings. The film includes 116,640 frames, with every frame shot twice, making 12 original frames for each second of projection time or 720 drawings per minute. At a length of 81 minutes, the film includes 58,320 drawings.

Fierlinger had earlier animated a half-hour PBS special called Still Life With Animated Dogs.

== Distribution and release ==
In July 2010, the film's U.S. distribution rights were acquired by New Yorker Films. It opened at the Film Forum in Manhattan on September 1, 2010.

The film was released in the UK and Ireland by Axiom Films on May 6, 2011.
