= The Pornographer (1999 film) =

- Directed by: Doug Atchison
- Written by: Doug Atchison
- Starring: Michael DeGood; Craig Wasson; Monique Parent
- Edited by: Doug Atchison
- Release date: 1999
- Country: United States
- Language: English

The Pornographer is a 1999 debut film written and directed by Doug Atchison. It premiered at the Santa Barbara Film Festival in 1999 and won Best Feature Film at the Arizona International Film Festival, before appearing on HBO.

== Plot ==
A man's amateur erotic film wins him a contract with an adult video distribution company, where he faces a series of moral crises.

== Critical reception ==
Scott Weinberg of Apollo Guide wrote, "A winning little indie that sheds some fascinating light onto an industry we rarely see." Steve Rhodes of Internet Reviews gave the film a positive review: "Partly tragic, frequently funny and always touching, the film creates characters you care about even when they go astray."

Variety wrote "An extremely naive philosophy informs "The Pornographer," a simplistic morality tale about a young, lonely man who attempts to realize his sexual fantasies by plunging into the corrupt world of adult video production."
