= The Tunnel (2019 film) =

Norwegian film directed by Pål Øie

- Official film poster
- Norwegian: Tunnelen
- Directed by: Pål Øie
- Written by: Kjersti Helen Rasmussen
- Produced by: Einar Loftesnes; John Einar Hagen
- Starring: Thorbjørn Harr; Ingvild Holthe Bygdnes
- Cinematography: Sjur Aarthun
- Music by: Martin Todsharow; Lars Löhn
- Production company: Nordisk Film
- Release date: December 25, 2019 (Norway)
- Running time: 105 minutes
- Country: Norway
- Language: Norwegian

The Tunnel (Norwegian: Tunnelen) is a 2019 Norwegian disaster thriller film directed by Pål Øie. The film follows the WSV driver Stein, played by Thorbjørn Harr, during a tunnel fire in a 9 kilometer long road tunnel. This movie is a remake of Hollywood movie Daylight (1996).

During The Kanon Award 2019, the film won the Audience Award and was also nominated in the category to Best Producer (John Einar Hagen and Einar Loftesnes) and Best Sound Design (Hugo Ekornes). During the Amanda Award 2020, Ingvild Holthe Bygdnes won the class for Best Supporting Actress for the film.

== Plot ==
At Christmas a tanker truck crashes in a Norwegian tunnel, causing a big fire to break out. Elise, the daughter of volunteer firefighter Stein Berge, is trapped with many other people in the tunnel. Now Stein and his colleagues try to save everyone.

== Cast ==
- Thorbjørn Harr as Stein
- Ylva Lyng Fuglerud as Elise
- Lisa Carlehed as Ingrid
- Ingvild Holthe Bygdnes as Andrea
- Peter Førde as Kurt
- Mikkel Bratt Silset as Ivar
- Per Egil Aske as Christian
- Jan Gunnar Røise as Gunnar
- Silje Breivik as Mia

== Reception ==
=== Critical response ===
According to the review aggregator website Rotten Tomatoes, 65% of critics have given the film a positive review based on 20 reviews, with an average rating of 6/10.
