= Ugly Betty =

2006 American comedy-drama television series

- Genre: Comedy drama; Romantic comedy
- Based on: Yo soy Betty, la fea by Fernando Gaitán
- Developed by: Silvio Horta
- Starring: America Ferrera; Eric Mabius; Alan Dale; Tony Plana; Ana Ortiz; Ashley Jensen; Becki Newton; Mark Indelicato; Vanessa Williams; Rebecca Romijn; Michael Urie; Kevin Sussman; Christopher Gorham; Judith Light; Daniel Eric Gold
- Composer: Jeff Beal
- Country of origin: United States
- Original language: English
- No. of seasons: 4
- No. of episodes: 85 (list of episodes)

Production
- Executive producers: Salma Hayek; Silvio Horta; Oliver Goldstick; Ben Silverman; Jose Tamez; Joel Fields
- Producers: Jeremy Beim; Jim Klever-Weis; Dawn DeKeyser
- Production locations: New York City ("Pilot" and seasons 3–4); Los Angeles (seasons 1–2); Silvercup Studios, New York City (seasons 3–4)
- Running time: 42 minutes
- Production companies: Ventanarosa Productions; Silent H Productions; Reveille Productions; ABC Studios (Note: Credited as Touchstone Television for the first season.)

Original release
- Network: ABC
- Release: September 28, 2006 – April 14, 2010

Related
- Yo soy Betty, la fea; La fea más bella; Betty en NY; Mode After Hours (web series); I Love Betty La Fea; List of Betty, la fea adaptations

Ugly Betty is an American comedy-drama television series developed by Silvio Horta, which aired on ABC from September 28, 2006, to April 14, 2010. It is based on the Colombian telenovela Yo soy Betty, la fea, created by Fernando Gaitán. The series follows Betty Suarez, a smart and well-meaning young woman from Queens, New York, who lacks fashion sense but secures a job at a high-end fashion magazine, Mode. As she navigates a glamorous but cutthroat industry, Betty challenges stereotypes and expectations while advancing her career and maintaining close ties to her family.

The series was produced by Salma Hayek's production company Ventanarosa, along with Silent H Productions, Reveille Productions, and ABC Studios. The pilot episode was filmed in New York City, but production moved to Los Angeles for the first two seasons before returning to New York for the final two. The show stars America Ferrera as Betty, alongside Eric Mabius, Vanessa Williams, Ana Ortiz, Tony Plana, Michael Urie, and Becki Newton.

Ugly Betty received critical acclaim for its performances—particularly Ferrera's—as well as for its themes of identity, body image, and representation. It won several major awards, including two Golden Globes, three Emmys, and a Peabody Award in 2007. Though ratings declined in later seasons, the series developed a strong following and is credited with advancing Latino and LGBTQ+ visibility in American television. Interest in a potential revival continued since its conclusion.

== Plot ==
Betty Suarez is a quirky Mexican American woman from Queens, New York, who is sorely lacking in fashion sense. She is known for her adult braces, rather unusual wardrobe choices, sweet nature, and slight naïveté. She is abruptly thrust into a different world when she lands a job at Mode, a trendy high-fashion magazine based in Manhattan that is part of the publishing empire Meade Publications, owned by the wealthy Bradford Meade. Bradford's son Daniel has been installed as editor-in-chief of Mode following the death of Fey Sommers (Bradford's longtime mistress). Bradford hires the inexperienced Betty as his womanizing son's newest personal assistant to curb his habit of sleeping with his assistants. As time goes by, Betty and Daniel become friends and help each other navigate their individual professional and personal lives.

Life at Mode is made difficult for both Betty and Daniel by their co-workers. Their most serious threat comes from creative director Wilhelmina Slater, a vindictive schemer who devises numerous plots to steal Daniel's job and seize control of the Meade empire. In addition, Wilhelmina's loyal assistant Marc St. James and Mode receptionist Amanda Tanen continually mock and humiliate Betty for her lackluster physical appearance, awkward nature, and initial lack of taste in fashion, though they both ultimately warm to Betty in later seasons. However, not everyone at Mode is against Betty; she gains loyal friends in Scottish seamstress Christina McKinney and nerdy accountant Henry Grubstick. She also receives strong support from her father Ignacio, older sister Hilda, and nephew Justin.

== Cast and characters ==
=== Main ===
- America Ferrera as Betty Suarez: A smart, kind-hearted young woman from Queens, New York, Betty begins working at Mode, a prestigious fashion magazine, despite her lack of fashion sense. Known for her optimism and integrity, she navigates a hostile work environment and ultimately grows into a confident and respected professional.
- Eric Mabius as Daniel Meade: The editor-in-chief of Mode and son of publishing executive Bradford Meade. Initially irresponsible and womanizing, Daniel gradually matures with Betty's influence and learns to take his role and relationships more seriously.
- Alan Dale as Bradford Meade (seasons 1-2) (Note: In the second season, Alan Dale is only credited as a main cast member through episode 10.): The powerful CEO of Meade Publications and father to Daniel. Bradford's complicated personal and professional life—including secrets, affairs, and corporate battles—sets many plotlines in motion during the early seasons.
- Tony Plana as Ignacio Suarez: Betty and Hilda's father, a caring and principled man who immigrated from Mexico. His undocumented status and past legal troubles form part of his character's early storylines, while he serves as the emotional anchor of the Suarez family.
- Ana Ortiz as Hilda Suarez: Betty's outspoken older sister and a single mother. Hilda runs a beauty salon and provides consistent emotional support for Betty. Her personal and romantic struggles are recurring themes throughout the series.
- Ashley Jensen as Christina McKinney (seasons 1-3; guest season 4): A Scottish seamstress working at Mode who becomes one of Betty's closest allies. Christina often serves as a moral voice within the magazine's cutthroat environment and becomes entangled in Wilhelmina's schemes.
- Becki Newton as Amanda Tanen: The receptionist at Mode, Amanda is initially portrayed as superficial and mocking, particularly toward Betty. Over time, she becomes more complex, with storylines that explore her insecurities and friendship with Marc.
- Mark Indelicato as Justin Suarez: Hilda's son and Betty's fashion-loving teenage nephew. Justin is expressive, flamboyant, and enthusiastic about performing arts and fashion. His coming-of-age and eventual coming out are significant aspects of his character arc.
- Vanessa Williams as Wilhelmina Slater: The ambitious and fashion-forward creative director of Mode, Wilhelmina is known for her manipulation and desire to take over the company. Despite her antagonistic role, her vulnerabilities and motivations are gradually revealed.
- Rebecca Romijn as Alexis Meade (seasons 1-2; recurring season 3) (Note: In the first season, Rebecca Romijn is introduced as a main cast member beginning with episode 13.): Daniel's transgender sister. Alexis reappears after a long absence and becomes involved in both family and business conflicts at Meade Publications. Her character played a significant role in early representation of transgender identities on network television.
- Michael Urie as Marc St. James (Note: In the first season, Michael Urie and Kevin Sussman are credited as guest stars in episodes 1 through 13 and billed as main cast from episode 14 onwards.): Wilhelmina's flamboyant and loyal assistant. Initially antagonistic, Marc's character becomes more sympathetic over time, with plots exploring his career aspirations, friendships, and personal identity.
- Kevin Sussman as Walter (season 1): Betty's former boyfriend in the early part of the series. Walter is portrayed as kind but complacent, and his relationship with Betty ends as she seeks a more ambitious and fulfilling path.
- Christopher Gorham as Henry Grubstick (recurring season 1; main season 2; guest seasons 3-4): An accountant at Mode and Betty's love interest during the first two seasons. Their relationship is central to several romantic storylines, complicated by distance and personal obligations.
- Judith Light as Claire Meade (recurring season 1; main seasons 2-4): The wife of Bradford Meade and mother to Daniel and Alexis. Claire is introduced while imprisoned for murder, but later becomes a key figure in the family and corporate storylines, often showing strength and cunning.
- Daniel Eric Gold as Matt Hartley (recurring season 3; main season 4) (Note: In the fourth season, Daniel Eric Gold is only credited as a main cast member through episode 11.): A sports editor-turned-artist who becomes romantically involved with Betty. Matt's insecurity and jealousy cause strain in their relationship, though he plays a pivotal role in Betty's romantic development.

== Episodes ==
| Season | Episodes | Originally released | |
| Season | Episodes | First released | Last released |
|---|---|---|---|
| 1 | 23 | September 28, 2006 | May 17, 2007 |
| 2 | 18 | September 27, 2007 | May 22, 2008 |
| 3 | 24 | September 25, 2008 | May 21, 2009 |
| 4 | 20 | October 16, 2009 | April 14, 2010 |

== Production ==
The idea to bring Ugly Betty to American TV screens began in 2001 when NBC was planning to adapt Betty as a half-hour comedy, which would be produced by Columbia TriStar Television (now Sony Pictures Television) but it did not get past the planning stages (three writers were needed to come up with a concept based around the character) until ABC and Hayek's company came on board in 2004 and retooled it as an hour-long comedy drama.

ABC had announced the title of the series would be Betty the Ugly, a change from its development title, but changed it back to Ugly Betty on July 14, 2006.

On October 13, 2006, ABC ordered a full season pick-up for the series, beyond the original 13 ordered at the May Upfronts due to its premiere ratings. ABC originally announced 22 episodes for season one, but increased the number of episodes by one to 23. The season finale is the episode called "East Side Story". On March 21, 2007, ABC renewed the series for a second season.

Although he subsequently joined NBC as their new entertainment head, Ben Silverman remained co-executive producer on the show, but in a limited role.

In November 2007, the cast of the series made headlines when they threw their support behind the 2007 Writers' strike by joining them on the picket line in solidarity. Ferrera commented on the reason they did this: "The issues coming up with the actors' contracts are very similar to what the writers are dealing with right now, and we have to stay united and stand strong within the creative community for what we believe is fair." On November 25, the cast appeared in a 38-second video for "Speechless Hollywood" in which a black & white camera pulled away from a close up of Ferrera to show her co-stars sitting next to her as they look directly at the camera without speaking.

On February 11, 2008, ABC picked up Ugly Betty for the 2008–09 television season, along with nine other shows. On the same day the renewal was announced, two of the show's executive producers, Marco Pennette and James Hayman, were let go. Their departure added to the constant off-camera turnovers on the series, including the exiting or firing of five writers. In a Q&A from TV Guide, Michael Ausiello criticized the decision, saying, "someone saw fit to fix what wasn't broken" and praised the two men for writing several of the show's best episodes. These turns of events may have also contributed to Rebecca Romijn's decision to no longer be a full-time regular on the series in the third season, citing the move by new writers to make changes in the direction of several characters, especially Romijn's role as Alexis.

With the strike over as of February 12, the possibility existed for seven new episodes to be completed by April, bringing the number of second-season episodes produced to 20, but only 18 episodes were eventually produced. As a result of the strike, creator Silvio Horta delayed plans for a musical episode and having Lindsay Lohan on board for a possible storyline until the third season. Four days later on February 16, 2008, ABC picked up Ugly Betty for the 2008–09 television season.

On March 12, 2008, Horta signed a two-year, seven-figure deal with ABC Studios, which guaranteed the show's future and gave Horta a chance to produce other projects aside from Ugly Betty.

On May 6, 2008, ABC announced that starting with the third season, Ugly Betty would return to New York City and start production there. The move was done to bring the authenticity of the great series' setting into the show and to take advantage of a tax credit offered by the State of New York's Governor's Office of Motion Picture and Television Development. The production returned to Silvercup Studios in Queens, where the original pilot was produced. The move resulted in several Los Angeles crew members being let go. These events led California Assemblyman Paul Krekorian to introduce bill AB X315, the "Ugly Betty Bill", which would keep television and film production from leaving the state by using tax incentives. The bill was passed by the assembly and Governor Arnold Schwarzenegger signed it into law on February 19, 2009.

In January 2009, ABC announced that it was putting Ugly Betty on hold to make room for the new comedies In the Motherhood and Samantha Who? in the Thursday night time slot. The series' aired one more original episode on March 19, 2009.

The move by ABC and the show's declining ratings led viewers to believe that ABC would cancel the show, but on February 17, 2009, Becki Newton stated that the show had been picked up for a fourth season. That statement would later be confirmed on March 5, 2009, when Stephen McPherson, president of ABC Entertainment Group, announced that ABC planned to renew Ugly Betty. On April 23, 2009, ABC gave an early fourth-season renewal to Betty.

Ugly Betty began airing on Friday nights starting October 16, 2009, at 9:00 p.m. Eastern/8:00 p.m. Central, although it was originally scheduled to start a week earlier on October 9. This caused fans and critics to worry that ABC wished to end the show, since that time slot is perceived as the Friday night death slot. On July 24, 2009, TV Guide Network announced that it had acquired the exclusive cable rights to the show and would air the fourth-season episodes two weeks after their ABC run with an option to strip the show daily, with plans to air it weekly starting in the fall of 2010.

With Eastwick recently cancelled, ABC began considering moving Ugly Betty to the Wednesday night 10:00 p.m. Eastern/9:00 p.m. Central timeslot, although talks arose of moving Lost to that same time slot. On December 1, 2009, ABC made the move to Wednesday official by announcing that it would start airing new episodes on its new night starting January 6, 2010.

== Cancellation ==
On January 27, 2010, ABC announced that Ugly Betty would cease production after the fourth-season finale, which aired in April 2010. "We've mutually come to the difficult decision to make this Ugly Betty's final season," said executive producer Silvio Horta and ABC Entertainment president Steve McPherson in a joint statement. The show had struggled in the ratings in the US, falling from an average 8.1 million to 5.3 million viewers between the third and fourth seasons.

== Future ==
On September 15, 2010, Ferrera stated that she knows of no plans for an Ugly Betty movie and that she thinks "the rumor is well and alive—it's always a possibility I suppose!" On September 29, 2010, Entertainment Weekly writer Michael Ausiello reported that a movie would not happen.

== International broadcasts ==
=== Australia ===
Its debut episode on the Seven Network pulled in 2.03 million viewers, beating Nine Network's airing of 60 Minutes and Ten Network's airing of The Biggest Loser in the same time period.

=== United Kingdom ===
The first season premiere on Channel 4 on January 5, 2007, attracted 4.89 million viewers. Two weeks later, Ugly Betty hit a new high with 5.5 million viewers watching the third episode. The figures and shares were similar each week, around 2–3 million viewers with 10–15% share; however, the finale rated less than the premiere episode, attracting 3.1 million viewers with 15% share.

== Reception ==
=== American ratings ===
| Season | Timeslot (EDT) | Season premiere | Season finale | TV season | Rank | Viewers (in millions) | 18–49 viewers |
|---|---|---|---|---|---|---|---|
| 1 | Thursday 8:00 p.m. | September 28, 2006 | May 17, 2007 | 2006–2007 | #35 | 11.3 | 3.7 |
| 2 | Thursday 8:00 p.m. | September 27, 2007 | May 22, 2008 | 2007–2008 | #53 | 9.4 | 3.6 |
| 3 | Thursday 8:00 p.m. | September 25, 2008 | May 21, 2009 | 2008–2009 | #64 | 8.0 | 2.8 |
| 4 | Friday 9:00 p.m. (2009) Wednesday 10:00 p.m. (2010) | October 16, 2009 | April 14, 2010 | 2009–2010 | #82 | 5.5 | 1.5 |

=== Cultural impact ===
Ugly Betty logo

The show's impact on issues and culture also attracted the attention of the United States Congress, where on January 17, 2007, California congresswoman Hilda Solis (D-32nd, El Monte) saluted Ferrera on both her Golden Globe win and for bringing a positive profile to the Latin and Hispanic communities. In addition to that recognition, on May 8, 2007, star America Ferrera was honored by TIME on the magazine's annual list of the 100 most influential people. The event took place at New York's Lincoln Center and the actress was recognized for defying stereotypes with the show.

Female education activist Malala Yousafzai has cited Ugly Betty as an early and important source on her development as a feminist. She was encouraged by her father to watch the show to improve her English and was struck by the freedom Betty and her friends had "as they walked freely down the streets of New York--with no veils covering their faces and no need for men to company them."

=== Awards and nominations ===
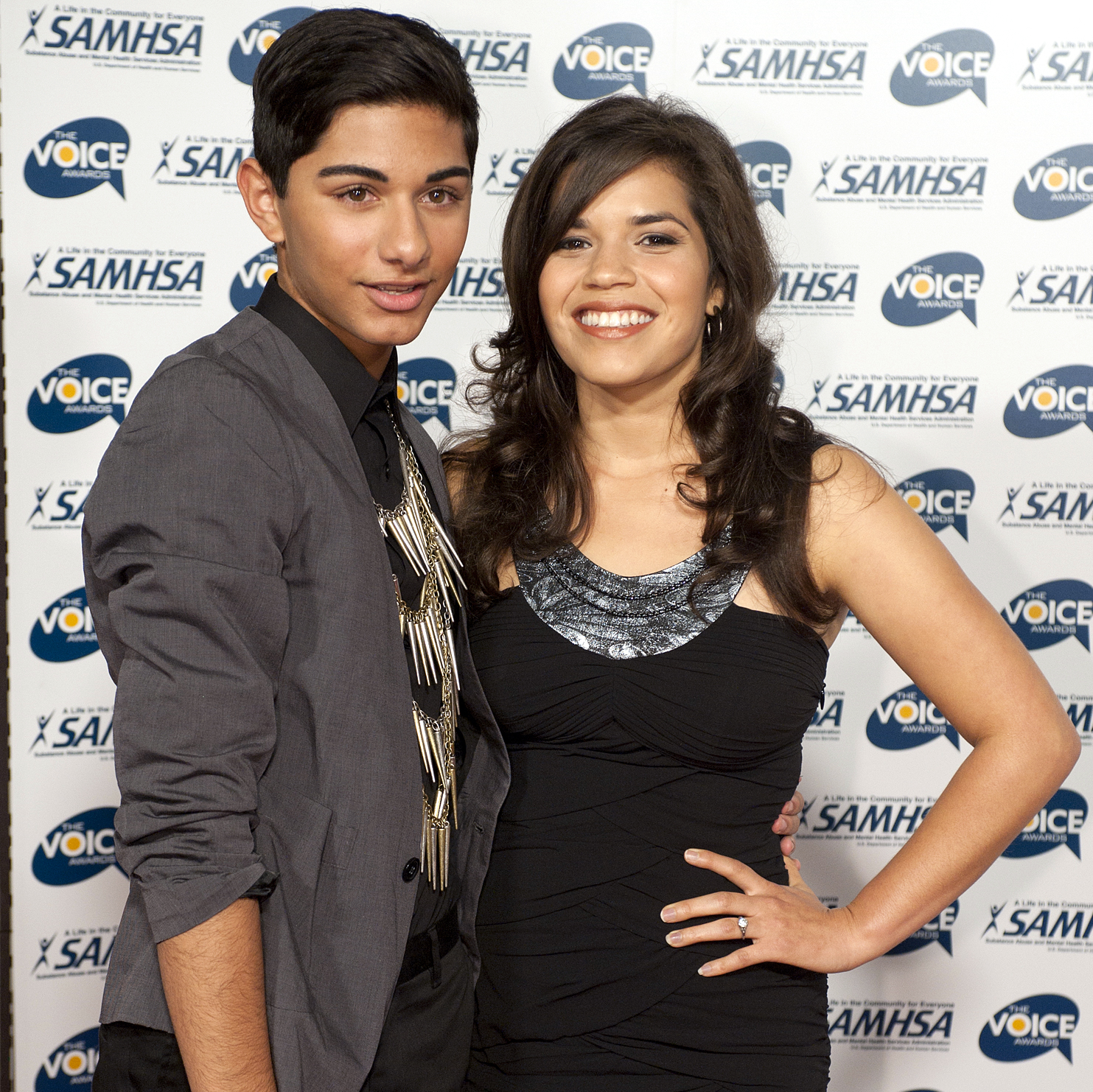
Mark Indelicato and America Ferrera at the 2010 Voice Awards

The series won two Golden Globe Awards on January 15, 2007, for "Best Leading Actress in a Comedy Series" (America Ferrera) and Best Comedy Series. Ferrera also won a SAG Award on January 28, 2007, for "Best Actress in a Comedy Series". On June 4, 2007, the series was honored with a Peabody Award "for demonstrating that wit and humanity never go out of style."

Ugly Betty won the Outstanding Comedy Series award by the Gay & Lesbian Alliance Against Defamation in April 2007. Judith Light also won a Prism Award for her portrayal of Claire Meade.

On July 19, 2007, the series received 11 nominations at the 59th Primetime Emmy Awards in the Comedy category (the most of any comedy series), including Outstanding Comedy Series, Outstanding Lead Actress in a Comedy Series (Ferrera), Outstanding Supporting Actress in a Comedy Series (Williams), and Outstanding Guest Actress in a Comedy Series (Hayek for her role as Sofia; Light for her role as Claire. Both lost to Elaine Stritch). It won three awards — Outstanding Casting for a Comedy Series, Outstanding Directing for a Comedy Series (for the show's pilot episode), and Outstanding Lead Actress in a Comedy Series (Ferrera).
