= Ring Ring (2019 film) =

- Directed by: Adam Marino
- Written by: Adam Marino; Naman Barsoom; Daniel Wallner
- Produced by: Cameron Fife; Tommy Kijas; Steven Jared Mangurten
- Starring: Malcolm Goodwin; Kirby Bliss Blanton; Tommy Kijas; Lou Ferrigno
- Cinematography: Steven Jared Mangurten
- Edited by: Adam Marino; Zachary Weintraub
- Music by: Attila Fodor
- Production company: Reel Fire Entertainment
- Distributed by: Indie Rights
- Release date: July 19, 2019
- Running time: 73 minutes
- Country: United States
- Language: English

Ring Ring is a 2019 American comedy thriller horror film directed by Adam Marino and starring Malcolm Goodwin, Kirby Bliss Blanton, Tommy Kijas and Lou Ferrigno.

== Premise ==
After being fired, a telemarketing group steals the contact list of the company's customers thinking of opening their own business, but they lose the phone where numbers are kept. Searching for the lost device on Halloween night, they end up trapped in the home of a drug addict.

== Cast ==
- Kirby Bliss Blanton as Amber
- Lou Ferrigno as Mr. Daniels
- Malcolm Goodwin as Will
- Tommy Kijas as Jacob
- Josh Zuckerman as Jason
- Alex Shaffer as Damien

== Release ==
The film was released on July 19, 2019.

== Reception ==
Bradley Gibson of Film Threat rated the film a 7 out of 10 saying that "the film gets a lot of things right, a few things wrong, and a couple of things deeply weird, which is not a bad mix for a thriller horror-comedy."

Frank Scheck of The Hollywood Reporter gave the film a negative review and wrote, "But despite its very brief running time, the movie feels plodding, never quite managing to land either the intended dark humor or scares to which it aspires." In his review on Los Angeles Times, Noel Murray said "it's like a series of uncompleted writing prompts".

== See also ==
- List of comedy horror films
- List of films set around Halloween
- List of horror films of 2019
- List of holiday horror films
