= Frank Shankwitz =

American philanthropist (1943–2021)

- Born: March 8, 1943; Chicago, Illinois, U.S.
- Died: January 22, 2021 (aged 77); Prescott, Arizona, U.S.
- Known for: Co-founder of Make-A-Wish Foundation
- Website: www.wishman1.com

Frank Earle Shankwitz (March 8, 1943 – January 24, 2021) was an American philanthropist who was a co-founder of the Make-A-Wish Foundation. He has received the President's Call to Service Award, the Making a Difference in the World, the Making a World of Difference and the Ellis Island Medal of Honor awards. In 2019, a full-length film titled Wish Man was released. It tells the story of Shankwitz, his life and the Make-A-Wish Foundation's founding.

== Early life ==
Raised in northern Arizona, Shankwitz attended grade school in Seligman, and junior high and high school in Prescott, graduating from Prescott High School in 1961. Following high school, Shankwitz enlisted in the U.S. Air Force, was stationed in England, and received an Honorable Discharge in 1965. Upon returning home, Shankwitz was employed by Motorola for seven years. Shankwitz graduated from Phoenix College in 1970, with continuing education at Arizona Western College and Arizona State University.

== Career ==
In 1972, Shankwitz began his career with the Arizona Department of Public Safety, assigned to the Arizona Highway Patrol as a car officer in the Yuma area. He began working with children as a coach for the Special Olympics program.

In 1975, Shankwitz was transferred to the Phoenix area to be part of a new 10-man Motorcycle Tactical Unit designed to work throughout the state. For the next seven years, whenever assigned to small towns, Shankwitz would visit local grade schools and talk about bicycle safety and let the children sit on his motorcycle.

In 1980, Shankwitz was one of the primary officers from the Arizona Highway Patrol who was involved in making the "wish" of seven-year-old Chris Greicius, who had end stage leukemia at the time, come true. Greicius wanted to be a Highway Patrol Motorcycle Officer like his heroes, Ponch and Jon from the television show, CHiPs. The boy was made the first and only Honorary Arizona Highway Patrol Officer in the history of the Arizona Highway Patrol, complete with a custom made uniform, badge, and Motor Officer Wings. Chris succumbed to his illness a few days after receiving his "wish", and was buried with full police honors in Kewanee, Illinois, with Shankwitz leading the police funeral procession. This is what inspired Shankwitz's idea to start a non-profit foundation that would let children "make-a-wish" and have it come true.

He remained an active duty state trooper until 1996. Shankwitz retired as a homicide detective from the Arizona Department of Public Safety, returned as a sworn Reserve Detective, assigned to the Prescott Police Department's Cold Case Homicide Unit, and was a member of the Yavapai County Mounted Sheriff's Posse.

== Make-A-Wish Foundation ==
Shankwitz, along with his wife Kitty and several others, founded the Make-A-Wish Foundation in 1980, with Shankwitz being the first president/CEO until 1984. Thirty-four years later, in 2014, the Make-A-Wish Foundation has grown to 64 chapters in the United States, 36 international chapters, covering five continents, and has granted over 500,000 wishes worldwide, with a wish being granted somewhere in the world on an average of every 42 minutes. Shankwitz continued to work with the Make-A-Wish Foundation as a Wish Ambassador and keynote speaker at fund-raising events for chapters throughout the United States, as well as a former board member of the Arizona chapter. Shankwitz and his wife Kitty were still volunteers and wish-granters for the foundation.

In 2004, Shankwitz received The President's Call To Service Award from President George W. Bush for service and civic participation, and recognition and appreciation for the commitment to strengthen our Nation and for making a difference through volunteer service.

In 2010, Shankwitz received the Tempe, Arizona Sister Cities "Making A World of Difference" award.

In 2010, Shankwitz was featured in Brad Meltzer's book, Heroes For My Son, identified as one of the 52 people who have made a difference in the world.

Shankwitz has been featured in USA Weekend Magazine, The Huffington Post, and other publications.

In 2013, Shankwitz co-authored with Rachelle Sparks the book, Once Upon A Wish, published by BenBella Books. Shankwitz has been featured in Greg Reid's, "Universal Wish" and Lisa Heidinger's, "Wishes In Flight".

In 2019, BBC Outlook Weekend interviewed Shankwitz about surviving his own challenging childhood, developing his philosophy of giving back, his brush with death, and his work, mentioning the film about his life, Wish Man.

In 2019, the film, "Wish Man" was released depicting the story of Shankwitz's life and the Make A Wish Foundation with Andrew Steel portraying Shankwitz in the film.

== Personal life ==
Shankwitz and his wife Kitty resided in Prescott, Arizona. His two adult daughters, three grandchildren, and one great-grandson reside in Ohio. He died from esophageal cancer on January 24, 2021, at the age of 77.
