= Doug Atchison =

American film director and screenwriter

- Born: United States
- Education: USC School of Cinematic Arts
- Occupations: Film director, screenwriter
- Notable work: Akeelah and the Bee

Doug Atchison is an American motion picture director and screenwriter. He received the Academy of Motion Picture Arts and Sciences Nicholl Fellowship for the screenplay for Akeelah and the Bee, which Atchison directed as a film in 2006.

After winning the Nicholl Fellowship, former ICM agent Lou Pitt guided Atchison's screenplay into production in partnership with Lions Gate Entertainment and 2929 Entertainment. Akeelah and the Bee went on to become a critical and modest commercial success for which Atchison won the 2007 Image Award for Outstanding Writing in a Feature Film/TV Movie. In 2006, Atchison entered into a three-picture deal with The Weinstein Company.

Atchison co-wrote the 2007 film Spinning into Butter starring Sarah Jessica Parker.

It was reported in 2012 that Atchison was attached to direct a movie about the hockey player Derek Sanderson.

Atchison wrote the screenplay for the 2018 feature film Brian Banks for which he won the Humanitas Prize in the Independent Feature Film Category and for which Atchison was nominated for the 2020 Image Award for Outstanding Writing in a Motion Picture (Film).

Atchison graduated from the University of Southern California's School of Cinema-Television.

== Filmography ==
=== Film ===
Year	Title	Director	Producer	Writer	Notes
1990	Ellen's Father	Yes	No	Yes	Short
1999	The Pornographer	Yes	Yes	Yes	Also actor
2006	Akeelah and the Bee	Yes	No	Yes	
2007	Spinning into Butter	No	No	Yes	
2018	Brian Banks	No	No	Yes	
