= Scar (film) =

- Theatrical release poster
- Directed by: Jed Weintrob
- Written by: Zack Ford
- Produced by: Douglas Berquist; Jamie Gordon; Courtney Potts; Norman Twain
- Starring: Angela Bettis; Kirby Bliss Blanton; Devon Graye; Al Sapienza; Ben Cotton; Brittney Wilson; Monika Mar-Lee; Carey Feehan; Tegan Moss; Christopher Titus
- Cinematography: Toshiaki Ozawa
- Edited by: Chris Figler
- Music by: Roger Neill
- Production company: Norman Twain Productions
- Distributed by: Phase 4 Films
- Release dates: August 24, 2007 (Montréal World Film Festival); October 1, 2010 (United States)
- Running time: 83 minutes
- Country: United States
- Language: English
- Budget: $4 million
- Box office: $4.9 million

Scar (also known as Scar 3D) is a 2007 American slasher film directed by Jed Weintrob, written by Zack Ford, and starring Angela Bettis.

== Plot ==
Joan Burrows returns to her hometown of Ovid, Colorado to attend her niece Olympia's high school graduation, but finds herself confronted by her past. Before their graduation is about to occur, a young couple goes missing and within a few days, a mutilated body is found in the water during a town fish festival. This initiates flashbacks in which Joan's dark past is learned. When Joan was 17, she and her best friend were kidnapped and tortured by a serial killer named Bishop. Bishop bound Joan and her friend to an autopsy table where one girl was tortured while the other had the power to make it stop simply by demanding the death of the friend. Joan was able to escape and kill her captor, but was left as the sole survivor of the spree with a scar on her cheek. With the present day's body count rising, questions arise whether Bishop has evaded death or if a copycat killer has arisen.

== Cast ==
- Angela Bettis as Joan Burrows
- Kirby Bliss Blanton as Olympia Burrows
- Ben Cotton as Ernie Bishop
- Devon Graye as Paul Watts
- Al Sapienza as Delgado
- Monika Mar-Lee as Sandra
- Christopher Titus as Jeff Burrows
- Tegan Moss as Susie Louise
- Brittney Wilson as Young Joan Burrows
- Brandon Jay McLaren as Howard
- Carey Feehan as Brian
- Kristin Kowalski as April
- Bill Baksa as Melvin Gray
- James D. Hopkin as Phillip Watts
- Emma Duncan as Principal

== Production ==
The film was first announced in August 2006 under the title Scar with May actress Angela Bettis attached as the lead and Zack Ford writing the script. Production was slated to begin in the fall with Jed Weintrob directing, who previously helmed Bloodwings: Pumpkinhead's Revenge and Blue Heat: The Case of the Cover Girl Murders. Production offices for the film opened on September 5, 2006 and had a scheduled 25 days of shooting in Calgary, Alberta, Canada beginning October 3, 2006.

The postproduction process was done at FotoKem, Technicolor, and Plaster City in Los Angeles. Final stereoscopic adjustments were done in Skip City in Kawaguchi, Japan with NTS (a division of NHK).

== Release ==
Scar premiered at the Montréal World Film Festival on August 24, 2007. The film was released domestically through video on demand by Phase 4 Films on October 1, 2010. The film had a limited theatrical release internationally, earning $4,940,153 against a $4 million budget.

=== Home media ===
The film was released on Blu-ray and DVD by Phase 4 Films on March 29, 2011.

== Reception ==
The film holds a 0% approval rating on Rotten Tomatoes, with 12 reviews. The site's critical consensus reads “A nasty, witless and unoriginal entry into the torture porn canon with hopeless acting and a waste of modern 3D technology.”

Peter Bradshaw of The Guardian wrote "another week, another yucky horror film with a title that sounds like Saw. For Time Out, Nigel Floyd called the film an "odd mix of ’70s slasher-movie plotting and modern charnel house depravity".

== See also ==
- List of films with a 0% rating on Rotten Tomatoes
