= Emily Rodgers =

American singer-songwriter

- Born: November 8, 1980 (age 45); Johnson City, Tennessee
- Origin: Pittsburgh, Pennsylvania
- Genres: Folk, Rock
- Occupation: Singer-songwriter
- Instruments: Voice, guitar, piano, viola
- Years active: 2004–present
- Label: Shimmy-Disc
- Website: emilyrodgers.com

Emily Rodgers is an American singer-songwriter and multi-instrumentalist. She is signed to Shimmy-Disc, which is owned and operated by noted indie producer Kramer, with whom she has worked for over a decade. Her music has been compared to Cat Power, Mazzy Star, Cowboy Junkies, Songs: Ohia, and Tara Jane O’Neil.

Rodgers grew up in Elkhart, Indiana, and attended Goshen College, where she studied English and began writing music and performing. In 2003, she moved to Pittsburgh, Pennsylvania, where she honed her craft and began performing in earnest. She released her first album in 2005, which was described as “post-rural, ethereal alt-country drenched in primo melancholy and reverb”.

In 2008, Rodgers was approached by legendary indie producer Kramer, who is known for having produced Galaxie-500, Daniel Johnston, Low, Will Oldham, and Half Japanese. That same year, she signed to Misra Records, which was home to Great Lake Swimmers, Centro-matic, and Shearwater. In 2009, Misra released Rodgers’ second album, Bright Day, which she debuted at the label's South by Southwest Music Festival showcase. In 2016, Rodgers released her third album, Two Years, on Misra, again with Kramer at the helm.

In 2019, Rodgers partnered with Kramer and her husband, guitarist Erik Cirelli, to write and record I Will Be Gone, her fourth LP. Written and recorded in just six days in her attic, the album utilizes lyrics by Rodgers and music by Cirelli. In addition to mixing, mastering, and producing the album, Kramer also serves as vocalist, bassist, pianist, and arranger, and the record belies an immediacy that is reflective of the time-limited nature of the recording process. The record was released in 2021 on Shimmy-Disc.

== Discography ==
- Emily Rodgers & Her Majesty's Stars (2005)
- In Spring Alchemy split e/p with Kevin Finn (2005)
- Bright Day (Misra Records, 2009)
- "This Town" appeared in the major motion picture Café (2010).
- "This Town" appeared on WYEP's Live & Direct: Volume 12.
- "Women of Arsenal" appeared on When We Shine: 15 Songs About Pittsburgh, funded by Allegheny Regional Asset District and Calliope: The Pittsburgh Folk Music Society
- Two Years (Misra Records, 2016)
- Emily Rodgers & How Things Are Made (2020)
- Only Midnight: Rodgers, Riordan, and Cirelli (2020)
- I Will Be Gone (Shimmy-Disc, 2021)

== Band members ==
- Emily Rodgers—guitars, viola, cello, piano
- Erik Cirelli—guitars, lap steel (Bright Day, Two Years, I Will Be Gone)
- Mark Lyons—drums (Two Years, I Will Be Gone)
- Megan Williams—violin, viola (Emily Rodgers & Her Majesty's Stars, Bright Day, Two Years, I Will Be Gone)
- Allison Kacmar—bass (Two Years)
- Paul Smith—drums, piano (Bright Day)
- Jon Paslov—guitar, bass (Emily Rodgers & Her Majesty's Stars, In Spring Alchemy)
- Michele Bartos—cello (Bright Day)
- Andrew Rishikof—drums (Emily Rodgers & Her Majesty's Stars)
- Austin Osterhout—bass, violin (Bright Day)
- Kevin Finn—guitar, drums (In Spring Alchemy)

== Personal life ==
Emily Rodgers attended Goshen College, where she majored in English. Upon graduation, she moved to Pittsburgh, Pennsylvania, where she launched her music career in earnest and studied creative writing at Chatham University. In 2012, she graduated from Carnegie Mellon University with an MA in literary and cultural studies and spent six years teaching English and creative writing at Duquesne University and Community College of Allegheny County. In 2018, she returned to graduate school and earned an MA in clinical mental health counseling; she currently works as a psychotherapist in private practice. She is married to guitarist Erik Cirelli.
