= Romerike Folk High School =

- Romerike Folkehøgskole
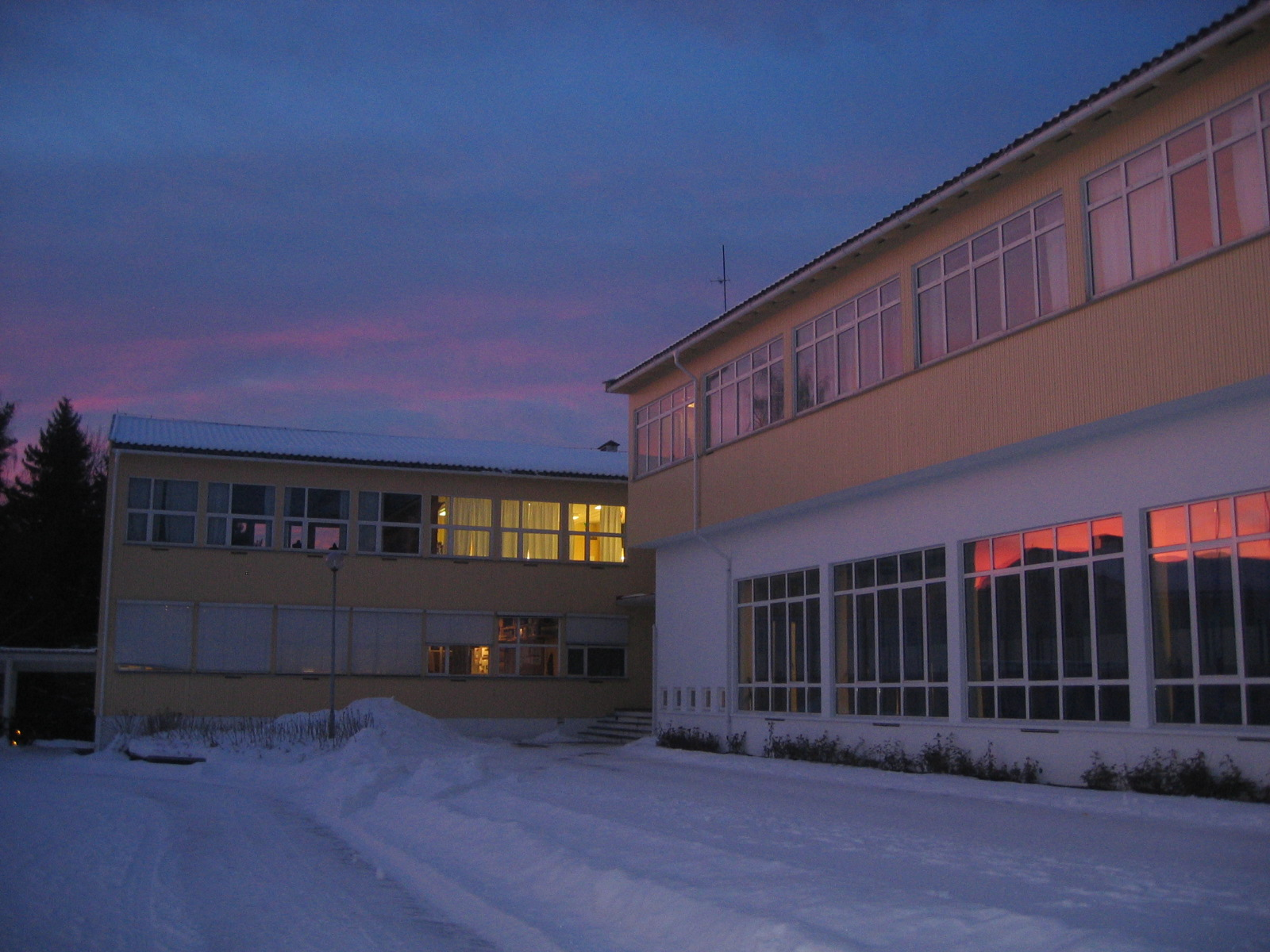
- Romerike Folk High School

Location
- Trondheimsveien 176, 2068 JESSHEIM; Jessheim; Norway
- Coordinates: 59°55′55″N 10°46′34″E

Information
- Founded: 1940
- Language: Norwegian
- Website: http://www.romerike.fhs.no/

Romerike Folk High School is a freelance folk high school at Jessheim in Akershus. The school has approximately 105 students and is owned by Akershus county. Romerike has cultivated one discipline, theater and music. Each year, approximately 40–50 small and large performances, everything from concerts, the whole evening's theater pieces and smaller study projects. The biggest productions play 10–14 performances, usually twice a day. The students live in boarding houses.

The school is 8 km from Oslo Airport, Gardermoen and 2 km from Jessheim city center at Nordbytjernet.

== Line subject ==
- Costume and theatrical makeup
- Sound and music
- Lighting design
- Music and theater
- Sets
- Theatre

== Notable students ==
Among the school's best known former pupils are several Norwegian actors and artists:

- Charlotte Frogner
- Dennis Storhøi
- Kristopher Schau
- Øivind Blunck
- Nikolaj Frobenius
- Gørild Mauseth
- Ane Dahl Torp
- Christian Løchstøer
- Solveig Kloppen
- Marian Saastad Ottesen
- Sven Nordin
- Katrine Moholt
- Aksel Hennie
- Nicolai Cleve Broch
- Trond Espen Seim
- Magnus Devold
- Anders Baasmo Christiansen
- Linn Skåber
- Sondre Justad
- Sigrid Bonde Tusvik
- Andrea Bræin Hovig
- Eva Weel Skram
- Camilla Tostrup
- Bjørn Skagestad
- Per Frisch
- Frank Kjosås
- Gaute Grøtta Grav
- Atle Antonsen
- Stine Buer
- Julia Schacht
- Anna Bache-Wiig
- Sondre Krogtoft Larsen
- Espen Klouman Høiner
- Nina Woxholtt
- Rolf Kristian Larsen
- Mats Eldøen
- Ida Elise Broch
- Birgitte Einarsen
- Frithjof Wilborn
- Henriette Steenstrup
- Erik-André Hvidsten
- Jørn Hoel
- Pål Sverre Valheim Hagen
- Tobias Santelmann
- Heine Totland
- Espen Hana
- Anette Hoff
- Jakob Schøyen Andersen
- Jørgen Langhelle
- Benjamin Helstad
- Peter Førde
