= State of Happiness =

Norwegian television series

- Norwegian: Lykkeland
- Genre: Period drama Serial drama
- Original languages: Norwegian; English
- No. of seasons: 3
- No. of episodes: 24

Original release
- Network: NRK

State of Happiness (Norwegian: Lykkeland) is a Norwegian period drama television series about the discovery of oil in the North Sea, and subsequent growth of the petroleum industry in Stavanger, beginning in 1969. It is directed by Petter Næss and Pål Jackman, written by Mette Marit Bølstad and coproduced by NRK and Maipo Film. Its first season premiered on NRK1 in 2018, and is set during the years 1969 to 1972. Its second season, covering the years 1977 to 1980, premiered in 2022. A third season, covering the years 1987 to 1990, was ordered in October 2022, with filming commencing in March 2023 and Norwegian premiere on 29 October 2024. The series has drawn comparisons to the American period drama Mad Men.

== Cast and characters ==
- Anne Regine Ellingsæter as Anna Hellevik, a secretary and Christian's fiancée and later Kay's wife.
- Amund Harboe as Christian Nyman (season 1), an oil rig diver and Anna's fiancé.
- Paal Herman Ims as Christian Nyman (seasons 2 & 3).
- Bart Edwards as Jonathan Kay, a lawyer from Phillips Petroleum Company (seasons 1 & 2).
- Malene Wadel as Toril Torstensen, a young mother and worker at Fredrik Nyman's company. Later Christian's wife.
- Pia Tjelta as Ingrid Nyman, a socialite, wife of Fredrik, and mother of Christian.
- Per Kjerstad as Fredrik Nyman, owner of a fish canning company in Stavanger, husband of Ingrid, and father of Christian.
- Mads Sjøgård Pettersen as Martin Lekanger, an oil rig diver.
- Adam Fergus as Ed Young, a businessman from Phillips Petroleum Company.
- Ole Christoffer Ertvaag as Rein Hellevik, Anna's brother.
- Laila Goody as Randi Torstensen, Toril's mother, and a devout Christian.
- Vegar Hoel as Arne Rettedal, a Stavanger politician.
- Roar Kjølv Jenssen as Leif Larsen, the mayor of Stavanger.
- Peter Førde, as Per Arne Bjørklund, a deep sea diver (season 3).
- Darius Udrys as Clarkson, a Phillips Petroleum Company executive (season 2).

== Awards and accolades ==
The first season of the series received five Gullruten awards from among eight nominations in 2019, including best drama series and best actor (Anne Regine Ellingsæter). Its second season received another nine nominations, winning five Gullruten awards in 2022.

Internationally, the series won awards for best screenplay and best music at the inaugural Canneseries in 2018. It received nominations in three categories during the 2019 Monte-Carlo Television Festival, but did not win.

== International release ==
Internationally, broadcasters in more than 60 countries have bought rights to the series, according to NRK. The series is known by the title "State of Happiness" in English. In the UK, the series was acquired by BBC Four. It was also acquired for Topic's streaming platform in the United States.

=== Reception ===
The Times Carol Midgley said that the series,"has a hypnotic charm and easily stands on its own merit", giving it four out of five stars.
