= Café (2010 film) =

- Café promotional poster
- Directed by: Marc Erlbaum
- Written by: Marc Erlbaum
- Produced by: Sean Covel; J Andrew Greenblatt; Chris Wyatt
- Starring: Jennifer Love Hewitt; Daniel Eric Gold; Jamie Kennedy; Michaela McManus; Madeline Carroll; Alexa Vega
- Cinematography: Joseph White
- Edited by: Demian Fenton
- Distributed by: Nationlight Productions
- Release date: October 2010 (Philadelphia Film Festival)
- Running time: 95 minutes
- Country: United States
- Language: English

Café is a 2010 independent drama film directed by Marc Erlbaum. It stars Jennifer Love Hewitt, Daniel Eric Gold, Alexa Vega and Jamie Kennedy, who was Hewitt's boyfriend at the time of filming.

== Plot ==
A good-hearted musician struggles to find a way to tell his beautiful barista coworker that he loves her, despite the fact that she is in a relationship with an abusive boyfriend.

Meanwhile, regulars and customers at the café where they work have their own problems and encounters. A police officer keeps his eye on his wayward cousin, who owes money to a charismatic dealer, and a married man contemplates his relationship with a good-looking new acquaintance.

However, one customer learns he is in fact the main character in the microcosm of the café, all designed by a young girl, who is actually God.

== Cast ==
- Jennifer Love Hewitt as Claire
- Alexa Vega as Sally
- Jamie Kennedy as Glenn
- Michaela McManus as the Movie Woman
- Madeline Carroll as Elly
- Daniel Eric Gold as Todd
- Cecelia Ann Birt as Earth Mother
- Katie Lowes as Kelly
- Hubbel Palmer as Avatar
- Richard Short as the Writer
- Khan Baykal as Colin
- Derek Cecil as the Movie Man
- Vaughn Goland as the Tattooed Goth Dude
- Gavin Bellour as Dave
- Clayton Prince as the Cop
- Adam Shapiro as Smitty
- Michael Satin as the Incredibly Tattooed Man
- Daniel McCaughan, J.D. as the Dancing & Computer Patron

== Filming ==
Filming started on May 11, 2009, in Philadelphia and ended in June 2009.

== Release ==
The film premiered at the 19th Philadelphia Film Festival in October 2010.

In February 2011, Maya Releasing acquired the film rights for the US theatrical and home video release and foreign sales of Café.

Café opened on August 19, 2011, in Los Angeles, California.

== Reception ==
The Los Angeles Times gave the film a mixed review, commending the acting from the leads but stating that the "story lines don't all effectively intertwine beyond their shared location."

== Awards ==
The film won the "Crystal Heart Award" at the 2010 Heartland Film Festival, with producer Chris Wyatt attending to accept the trophy.

== Music ==
- "New Song" by Birdie Busch
- "High Noon" by The Albertsons
- "Orphan" by La Strada
- "Butterfly" by Michelle Nágy
- "Flesh and Bone" by Andrew Lipske & the Prospects
- "Sorry Waltz" by Hezekiah Jones
- "This Town" by Emily Rodgers
- "Song For Tom" by The Innocence Mission
- "Mama" by La Strada
- "Firefly" by Mama Mac
- "Sweet Changin' Heart" by Andrew Lipske & the Prospects
- "Farewell" by Chris Kasper
- "When They Fight, They Fight" by The Generationals
- "Paperback Man" by Drew Pearson
- "Heron Blue" by Sun Kil Moon
- "Sing To Me" by Stephen Bluhm
- "Her Rotating Head" by Bachelorette
- "Gone Away From Me" by Ray LaMontagne
- "The Gun" by The Daily Parade
- "Tumbling" by Maus Haus
- "Alone" by Palomar
- "The Air Between Us" by Palomar
- "Slightly Under Water" by Red Heart the Ticker
- "Telegram" by Buried Beds
- "Bury Me Closer" by Palomar
- "Poison" by Emily Ana Zeitlyn and the Weeds
- "Fully" by Teddy Goldstein
- "There'll Be Pizza in the Valley" by Little Ocean
- "Broken" by Chauncey Jacks
- "Clover" by Ramona Falls
- "Salt Sack" by Ramona Falls
- "Home" by Marla
- "Not The Real Thing" by Teddy Goldstein

Additional Music by Christopher Brady
