= Norman Twain =

American film producer

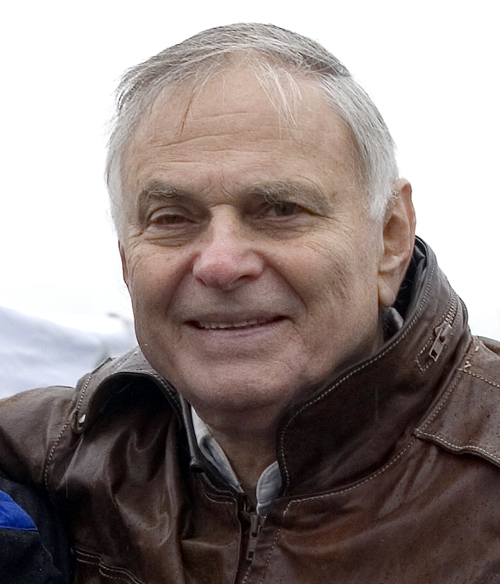
- Born: September 13, 1930; Atlantic City, New Jersey
- Died: August 6, 2016 (aged 85)
- Occupation: Producer
- Spouse: Deanna Deignan Twain

Norman Twain (September 13, 1930 – August 6, 2016) was an American film and theatre producer.

== Early work in theatre ==
Born in Atlantic City in 1930, Twain began his career in theatre, producing and directing over 50 stage productions on and off-Broadway in Los Angeles, Chicago, and London which included: Tennessee Williams's Garden District, Maxwell Anderson's The Golden Six, John Osborne's Epitaph for George Dillion, the Franco Zeffirelli production of The Lady of the Camellias, Jean Anouilh's Traveller Without Luggage, the musicals Bajour by Walter Marks and Ernest Kinoy, Henry Sweet Henry by Robert Merrill, Lolita, My Love by Alan Jay Lerner and John Barry, The World of Charles Aznavour and Gilbert Becaud on Broadway, as well as John Guare's Cop-Out, the Tony Richardson-Nicol Williamson production of Hamlet, The Nicol Williamson Late Show, The World of Lenny Bruce, ten separate productions of Vanities by Jack Heifner, Jules Feiffer's Hold Me!, the Milton Katselas production of David Rabe's Streamers in Los Angeles and at the Long Beach Theater Festival, the Tony Richardson production of As You Like It, Cyrano starring Stacy Keach and the Gower Champion production of Our Town.

== Career in film and television ==
For Warner Bros, Twain produced Lean on Me, for which he also created the idea and developed the script. It starred Morgan Freeman as Joe Clark, the principal of Eastside High School in Paterson, New Jersey. Lean on Me, written by Michael Schiffer, was directed by John Avildsen and won the NAACP Image Award for Best Feature Film of the year.

He created and developed the idea and served as Executive Producer for the HBO film Boycott. Based on a book by Dr. Stewart Burns and directed by Clark Johnson, with Jeffrey Wright, Carmen Ejogo and Terrence Howard, the film dramatized the 1955 Montgomery, Alabama Bus Boycott and was nominated as Best Television Film of the Year by the American Film Institute. Boycott also won the NAACP Image Award for Best Television Film of the Year and the Peabody Award.

Twain served as Executive Producer with Strata Films for Heavens Fall, which was directed by Terry Green and starred Timothy Hutton, David Strathairn, Leelee Sobieski, Anthony Mackie, Azura Skye, and Bill Sage. Twain produced Scar, a high definition 3D action horror film written by Zack Ford. In 2008, he produced Spinning into Butter with Lou Pitt and Sarah Jessica Parker, who starred and also produced.

Twain's last film, produced with Howard Kaminsky and Frank Pellegrino of Pellekam Productions, was the animated feature, My Dog Tulip, based on the renowned British novel of the same name by J.R. Acklerley. Paul and Sandra Fierlinger animated and directed the feature which stars the voice talents of Christopher Plummer, Lynn Redgrave, Isabella Rossellini, and Brian Murray. My Dog Tulip was an official selection at the Toronto International Film Festival as well as festivals in Annecy, Pusan, Brussels, Utrecht, Melbourne, Jerusalem, Goteborg, Palm Springs and San Francisco. It was listed as one of the New York Times Top 10 movies of 2010 by Stephen Holden and was also named one of the best animated films of 2010 by Roger Ebert.

== Stage productions ==
- Bajour – Producer (1965)
- Peterpat – Producer (1965)
- The World of Charles Aznavour – Producer (1965)
- Manuela Vargas – Producer (1966)
- Gilbert Becaud on Broadway – Producer (1966)
- The Apparition Theatre of Prague – Producer (1966)
- Henry, Sweet Henry – Producer (1967)
- Gilbert Becaud Sings Love – Producer (1968)
- Cop-Out – Producer (1969)
- Hamlet – Producer (1969)
- Charles Aznavour – Producer (1970)

== Filmography ==
- Superman (TV movie) – Producer (1975)
- The Hotel New Hampshire – Associate Producer (1984)
- Lean on Me – Producer (1989)
- Joe Torre: Cureveballs Along the Way (TV movie) – Producer (1997)
- Boycott (TV movie) – Executive Producer (2001)
- Heavens Fall – Executive Producer (2006)
- Scar – Producer (2007)
- Spinning into Butter – Producer (2008)
- My Dog Tulip – Producer (2009)
