= Us (2019 film) =

American horror film by Jordan Peele

- Theatrical release poster
- Directed by: Jordan Peele
- Written by: Jordan Peele
- Produced by: Jason Blum; Ian Cooper; Sean McKittrick; Jordan Peele
- Starring: Lupita Nyong'o; Winston Duke; Elisabeth Moss; Tim Heidecker
- Cinematography: Mike Gioulakis
- Edited by: Nicholas Monsour
- Music by: Michael Abels
- Production companies: Blumhouse Productions; Monkeypaw Productions
- Distributed by: Universal Pictures
- Release dates: March 8, 2019 (SXSW); March 22, 2019 (United States)
- Running time: 116 minutes
- Country: United States
- Language: English
- Budget: $20 million
- Box office: $256.1 million

Us is a 2019 American psychological horror film written, directed, and co-produced by Jordan Peele, and starring Lupita Nyong'o, Winston Duke, Elisabeth Moss and Tim Heidecker. The story follows Adelaide Wilson and her family, who are attacked by a group of menacing doppelgängers, called the "Tethered".

The project was announced in February 2018. Peele produced the film alongside Jason Blum and Sean McKittrick, having previously collaborated with them on Get Out and BlacKkKlansman. Filming took place in California, including Los Angeles, Pasadena and Santa Cruz, from July to October 2018.

Us premiered at South by Southwest on March 8, 2019, and was theatrically released in the United States on March 22, by Universal Pictures. The film was a commercial success, grossing $256 million against a budget of $20 million, and received widespread critical acclaim, having been included in various lists of the greatest horror films of the 21st century.

== Plot ==
In 1986, little Adelaide Thomas wanders away from her parents at the Santa Cruz Beach Boardwalk and enters a funhouse. She encounters a doppelgänger of herself in the house of mirrors. Following the encounter, she suddenly stops speaking, and withdraws from her family.

Thirty-three years later, Adelaide, now a woman, reluctantly joins her husband, Gabe Wilson, and their children, Zora and Jason, on a vacation. They are joined by friends, Josh and Kitty Tyler, along with their twin daughters, Becca and Lindsey, at the beach. During their outing, they observe paramedics removing the body of a man holding a sign that matches one Adelaide had seen on the day she encountered her doppelgänger, as a small girl. Later, Jason spots an individual bearing a striking resemblance to the deceased, motionless with outstretched arms and bloodied hands.

That night, Adelaide relays her story to Gabe, when the lights suddenly go out. Jason notices a family of four in the driveway, who break into the house and corner the Wilsons. The intruders are the Wilsons' doppelgängers: Red (Adelaide's doppelganger, who she met all those years ago), Pluto (Jason's pyromaniac, facially scarred double), Umbrae (Zora's sadistic double) and Abraham (Gabe's animalistic double). Red is the only double who can speak, albeit in a raspy voice. She explains that they are called "the Tethered", as they share a soul with their counterparts and have come to "untether" themselves. The Wilsons are separated and terrorized by their doppelgängers. Jason discovers that Pluto mirrors his actions. After Gabe kills Abraham, the family escapes.

Meanwhile, the Tyler family is attacked and murdered in their home by their doppelgängers. The Wilsons arrive and are attacked as well, but they manage to overpower and kill the Tylers' doubles. They watch the news and learn that the Tethered have been murdering their equivalents across the city then joining hands to form a human chain (similar to the one from the Hands Across America demonstration) that surrounds the city. The Wilsons decide to drive along the coast and escape to Mexico. While they are leaving, Umbrae intercepts the car but Zora throws her off the car and kills her; Adelaide goes separately to comfort Umbrae as she dies.

Arriving at the boardwalk, the Wilsons find many townspeople slaughtered. The road is blocked by a burning car. Jason, realizing it is a trap set by Pluto, orders everyone out of the car. Before Pluto can ignite the family's car, Jason walks backwards, causing Pluto to do the same and thus walk directly into the fire, to Adelaide's sadness. While the Wilsons are distracted by Pluto burning to death, Red appears and snatches Jason away. Adelaide chases Red to the funhouse where they first met and finds a secret entrance that leads to an underground facility overrun by white rabbits, where she finds Red in a classroom.

Red vaguely explains that the Tethered are duplicates created, presumably by the government, to control the populace. When the experiment failed, the Tethered were abandoned underground mindlessly mimicking the actions of their counterparts and surviving on raw rabbit meat. After the other doppelgängers realized Red was "different", when she snapped them out of their lethargy, she spent years organizing them to escape and take vengeance by murdering their counterparts. Red and Adelaide begin to fight, but Red evades and counters all of Adelaide's attacks. When Adelaide allows Red to attack, she impales Red with a fireplace poker, then strangles her and breaks her neck. She rescues Jason from a locker with Jason also rescuing one of the rabbits.

As she escapes in an ambulance with her family, Adelaide reflects back to the night she first met Red: it's revealed that she is the Tethered doppelgänger and that Red was the original Adelaide. The doppelgänger, having choked Adelaide unconscious, dragged and trapped her underground then returned to the surface to usurp her life. Jason looks at his mother who simply smiles, while the Tethered form a human chain that stretches across the countryside.

== Cast ==
Performer	Main character	"Tethered" character
Lupita Nyong'o	Adelaide "Addy" Wilson	Red
Winston Duke	Gabriel "Gabe" Wilson	Abraham
Shahadi Wright Joseph	Zora Wilson	Umbrae
Evan Alex	Jason Wilson	Pluto
Elisabeth Moss	Kitty Tyler	Dahlia
Tim Heidecker	Josh Tyler	Tex
Yahya Abdul-Mateen II	Russel Thomas	Weyland
Anna Diop	Rayne Thomas	Eartha
Cali Sheldon	Becca Tyler	Io
Noelle Sheldon	Lindsey Tyler	Nix
Madison Curry	Young Adelaide	Young Red
Ashley McKoy	Teenage Adelaide	Teenage Red
Napiera Groves	Dr. Foster	—N/a
Lon Gowan	Don	—N/a
Alan Frazier	Ferdie	Jeremiah
Duke Nicholson	Danny	Tony
Dustin Ybarra	Troy	Brand
Nathan Harrington	Glen	Jack
Kara Hayward	Nancy	Syd
Jordan Peele	Dying Rabbit/Fun House Narrator	—N/a

== Production ==
=== Development ===
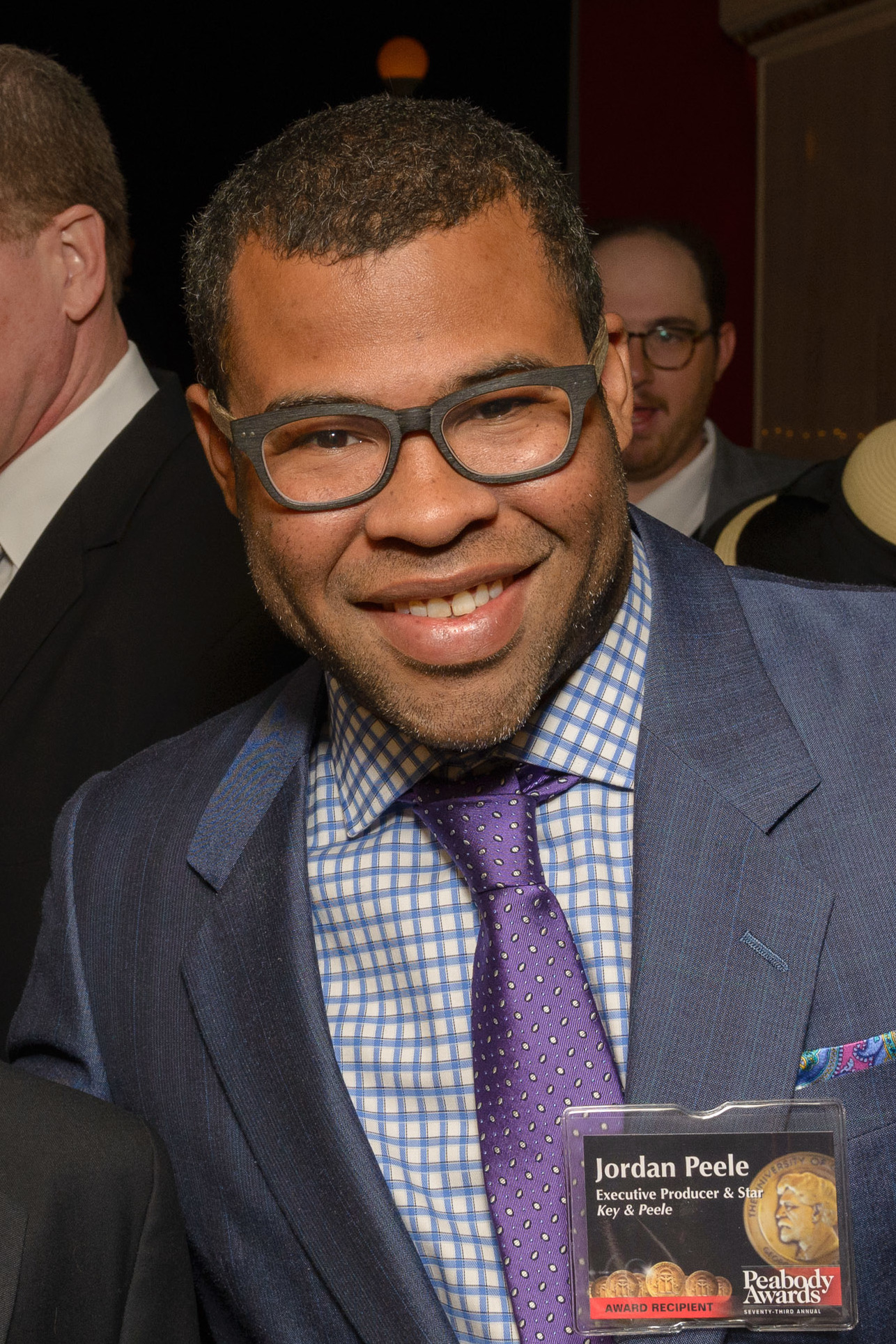
Writer, director, and producer Jordan Peele

After being dismayed with the "genre confusion" over his previous film, Get Out, Peele opted to make his next film a "full-on" horror film. Peele has said that an inspiration for Us was The Twilight Zone episode "Mirror Image", which was centered on a young woman and her evil doppelgänger.

Peele also revealed that the idea of the Tethered living underground came to him when he was a teenager taking the train home from studying at Sarah Lawrence College:

"You get out of the train and you have to go down through an underpass and come out the other side. There's no one else there, just this dark, American town. I'd come up and I'd look over to the other side, and I'd picture seeing the tail end of myself going down that same tunnel, to presumably emerge right near me 30 seconds later. And that’s where I love to start with a horror story: ‘What is this primal thing that’s affecting me in a way I don’t quite understand?’"

— Jordan Peele

=== Casting ===
On May 8, 2018, it was announced that Lupita Nyong'o, Winston Duke and Elisabeth Moss were all in negotiations to star in the film, with Nyong'o and Duke portraying a black couple, and Moss portraying one half of a white couple. Nyong'o later confirmed her casting by posting the film's promotional poster on her Instagram. The rest of the cast, including Tim Heidecker, Yahya Abdul-Mateen II, Shahadi Wright Joseph and Evan Alex were all confirmed in July of that year.

Peele saw the characters of the film as an "archetypal foursome", with Adelaide being the leader, Zora being the warrior, Gabe being jester/fool and Jason being the wiz/magician. For her role, Nyong'o had to use a different voice for the character of Red. She said her performance was inspired by the condition spasmodic dysphonia, a condition that causes a person's voice to go into periods of spasm. In order to perfect her voice, she "worked with an ear, nose, and throat doctor, a vocal therapist, and my dialect coach to try and make sure I could do it and do it safely. 'Cause I had two roles to play, I couldn't afford to damage my voice."

=== Filming ===
Principal photography began on July 30, 2018, in Santa Cruz, California, including their famous Boardwalk. Most of the film was shot in Los Angeles, and the main house featured is located in Pasadena. The house had modifications and the team spent six weeks there. Filming wrapped on October 8, 2018.

=== Post-production ===
The visual effects were provided by Industrial Light & Magic and supervised by Grady Cofer.

Michael Abels, who had previously scored Peele's Get Out, returned to do the same for Us.

== Soundtrack ==
The 1995 Luniz song "I Got 5 on It" is heavily featured in this film, first at the beginning, when the family is driving to the beach and then later on in the film when the "tethered" family breaks into the vacation home. The once-fun song transmogrifies into an eerily orchestral "Tethered Mix", slowing everything down, and fully indulging the ominous quality of the film. Due to the track's popularity upon the trailer's release, it was edited into the final cut of the film, appearing during the climax. Waxwork Records announced in August 2019 that they would release the soundtrack to the film on vinyl, which contained Abels's popular score. The N.W.A song "Fuck tha Police" is also heard when Kitty Tyler tells the voice assistant Ophelia to "call the police", moments before she is killed by her Tethered counterpart, Dahlia, and the song plays throughout when the Wilsons enter the Tyler family's home. The ending features the Minnie Riperton song "Les Fleurs".

== Marketing ==
The official trailer was released on December 25, 2018. The trailer, which was set to a darker version of the song "I Got 5 on It", featured a similar tone, editing, and shots as Peele's Get Out, prompting speculation that the two films were set in the same universe.

A second trailer was released on February 3, 2019, for Super Bowl LIII. That trailer featured a narration by Lupita Nyong'o's character, Adelaide, speaking with her husband Gabriel about the strange coincidences happening since they arrived at their beach house, and describing it as a "black cloud" hanging over them. The new theatrical release date, March 22, was announced at the end of the trailer. Deadline Hollywood estimated the studio spent around $77 million on promotion and advertisements for the film.

== Release ==
Us had its world premiere at the South by Southwest film festival (SXSW) on March 8, 2019. It was also screened on March 6, 2019, before its official release, at Howard University. The film was originally scheduled for theatrical release in the United States on March 15, 2019, but was pushed back a week to March 22, following the announcement of its SXSW premiere.

=== Home media ===
Us was released on 4K UHD Blu-ray, Blu-ray and DVD on June 18, 2019. The 4K release is an upscale from the 2K master.

== Reception ==
=== Box office ===
Us grossed $175.2 million in the United States and Canada, and $80.9 million in other territories, for a worldwide total of $256.1 million, against a production budget of $20 million. Deadline Hollywood calculated the net profit of the film to be $119 million, when factoring together all expenses and revenues.

In the United States and Canada, initial tracking had Us grossing $35–40 million in its opening weekend. By the week of its release, estimates had risen to $45–50 million, with advance ticket sales on Fandango outpacing A Quiet Place ($50.2 million) and Get Out ($33.7 million). The film made $28.9 million on its first day, including $7.4 million from Thursday night previews, one of the best-ever for a horror film and far higher than the Thursday night preview numbers for Get Out, which only grossed $1.8 million, increasing weekend estimates for Us to $68 million. It went on to earn $71.1 million at the box office, debuting at number one and becoming the second best opening for a live-action original film after Avatar ($77 million in 2009), as well as the third-best total for a horror film after It ($123.4 million in 2017) and Halloween ($76.2 million in 2018) and the best ever opening for an original horror film not based on a known property. In its second weekend, the film made $33.6 million, dropping 52.7% (slightly above-average for a horror film but much larger than the 15% seen by Get Out) and finishing second behind newcomer Dumbo.

=== Critical response ===
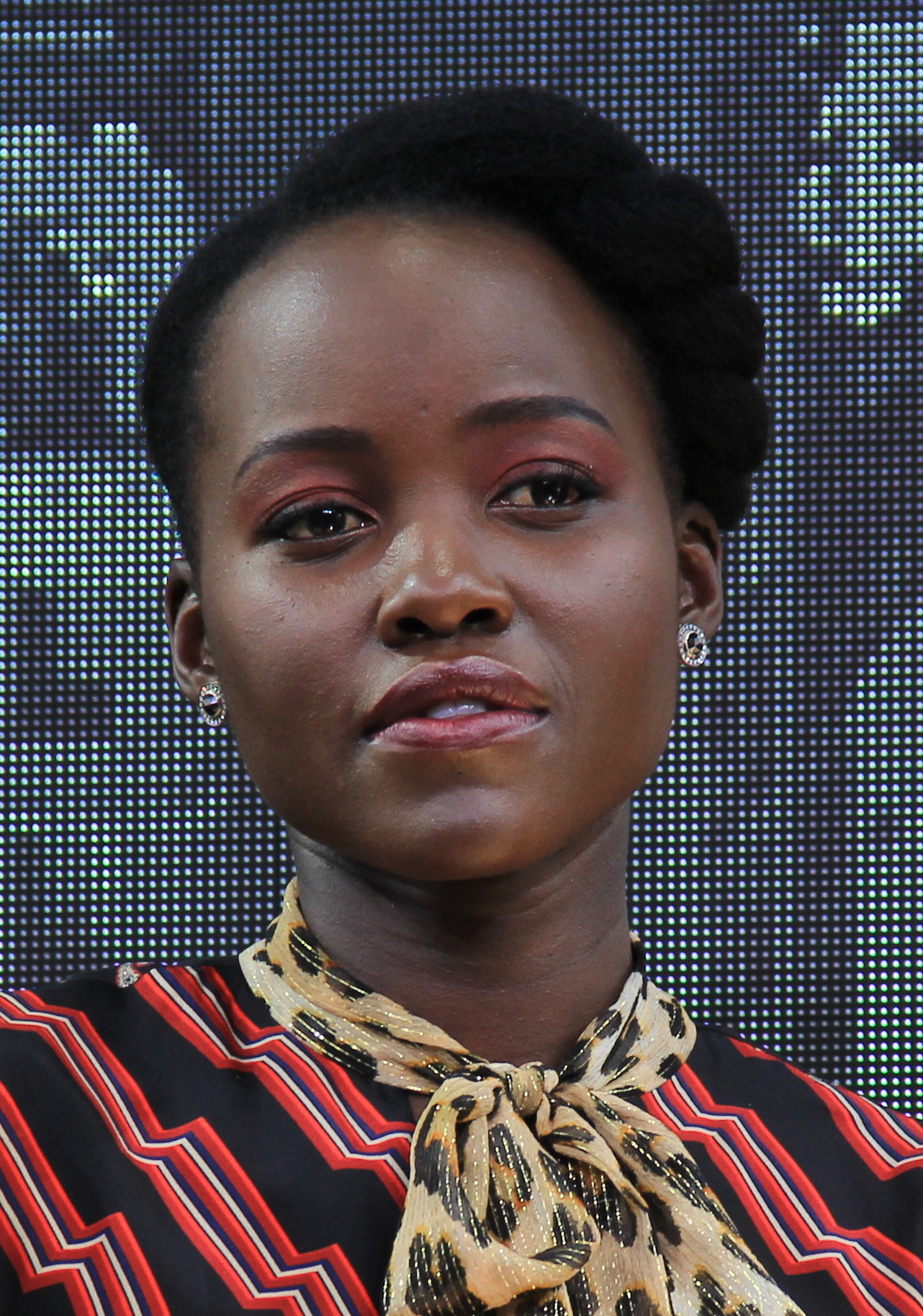
Lupita Nyong'o received widespread critical acclaim for her dual role performance in the film.

On the review aggregator website Rotten Tomatoes, 93% of 550 critics' reviews are positive, with an average rating of 7.9/10. The website's critical consensus reads, "With Jordan Peele's second inventive, ambitious horror film, we have seen how to beat the sophomore jinx, and it is Us." On Metacritic, the film has a weighted average score of 81 out of 100, based on 56 critics, indicating "universal acclaim". Audiences polled by CinemaScore gave the film an average grade of "B" on an A+ to F scale, while those at PostTrak gave it an overall positive score of 80%, with 60% saying they would definitely recommend it. Us was described by Rolling Stone as "spill-your-soda scary", compared to the "existentially terrifying" Get Out.

Monica Castillo of RogerEbert.com gave the film four out of four, writing that: "Us is another thrilling exploration of the past and oppression this country is still too afraid to bring up. Peele wants us to talk, and he's given audiences the material to think, to feel our way through some of the darker sides of the human condition and the American experience." David Griffin of IGN gave the film 9.0/10, calling it "a very, very strange film. But that's OK because it wouldn't be a Jordan Peele joint if there wasn't a little risk involved. Peele has proven that he's not a one-hit wonder with this truly terrifying, poignant look at one American family that goes through hell at the hands of maniacal doppelgangers". John DeFore of The Hollywood Reporter called Us "a fiercely scary movie whose meaning is up for grabs".

Richard Brody of The New Yorker called the film a "colossal achievement," writing, "Us is a horror film—though saying so is like offering a reminder that The Godfather is a gangster film or that 2001: A Space Odyssey is science fiction. Genre is irrelevant to the merits of a film, whether its conventions are followed or defied; what matters is that Peele cites the tropes and precedents of horror in order to deeply root his film in the terrain of pop culture—and then to pull up those roots."

In July 2025, The Hollywood Reporter ranked it number 12 on its list of the "25 Best Horror Movies of the 21st Century."

Conversely, Stephanie Zacharek of Time thought Peele had too many ideas and not enough answers compared to Get Out and said, "Peele goes even deeper into the conflicted territory of class and race and privilege; he also ponders the traits that make us most human. But this time, he's got so many ideas he can barely corral them, let alone connect them. He overthinks himself into a corner, and we're stuck there with him."

Disability rights groups National Spasmodic Dysphonia Association and RespectAbility criticised Nyong'o for basing her performance on spasmodic dysphonia. She later apologized, stating that she "wasn’t interested in vilifying or demonising the condition," and "crafted Red with love and care."

=== Accolades ===
Us was nominated for one Art Directors Guild, four Critics' Choice Movie Awards, one Make-Up Artists and Hair Stylists Guild, three MTV Movie & TV Awards, eight NAACP Image Awards, four People's Choice Awards, one Bram Stoker Award (won), seven Saturn Awards (winning one), one Screen Actors Guild Award, and one World Soundtrack Awards (won).

When nominations were announced for the 92nd Academy Awards, various media outlets commented that Nyong'o was snubbed in the Best Actress category for her performance in Us.

== Themes and interpretations ==
Critic Jim Vejvoda related the Tethered to "urban legends" and "xenophobic paranoia about the Other", also writing they resembled the Morlocks in H. G. Wells's 1895 novel, The Time Machine. Journalist Noel Ransome viewed the film as being about "the effects of classism and marginalization", writing "the Tethered are effigies of this same situational classism. They're trapped—mentally and physically—and ignored". Joel Meares of Rotten Tomatoes also noted that the Tethered, referencing the "we're Americans" line, are representatives of the duality of American society, how some citizens can afford to live on top of the class system while others are stuck in poverty. He also noted the title Us could mean "U.S.", or United States.

Manohla Dargis of The New York Times notes that the Wilsons are "introduced with an aerial sweep of greenery" similar to the opening of Stanley Kubrick's The Shining, and sees that movie as the principal influence on Us. Describing Peele as a "true cinephile", she also identifies allusions to other films, including Jaws, A Nightmare on Elm Street, and The Goonies, as well as one scene suggesting an influence by the Austrian film director Michael Haneke's 1997 horror film Funny Games and subsequent U.S. remake.

The Tethered's red jump suits and single glove were an allusion to Michael Jackson, as was the "Thriller" shirt seen on young Adelaide, and Peele has stated that Jackson was "the patron saint of duality". Peele referenced many other instances of 1980s culture, including allusions to The Lost Boys and Hands Across America, stating "Everything in this movie was deliberate, that is one thing I can guarantee you. Unless you didn't like something and that was a complete accident".

The film contains numerous references to Jeremiah 11:11, which reads: "Therefore thus saith the Lord: 'I will bring on them a disaster they cannot escape. Although they cry out to me, I will not listen to them'" (NIV). Critic Rosie Fletcher commented on the context, with Jeremiah warning Jerusalem was facing destruction due to false idols, and expressed the opinion that the film's characters also "worshiped the wrong things", such as Ophelia, the virtual assistant.

Peele later explained in the film's digital release special features that a central theme of the film is American privilege:

"One of the central themes in Us is that we can do a good job collectively of ignoring the ramifications of privilege. I think it's the idea that what we feel like we deserve comes, you know, at the expense of someone else's freedom or joy. You know, the biggest disservice we can do as a faction with a collective privilege like the United States is to presume that we deserve it, and that it isn't luck that has us born where we're born. For us to have our privilege, someone suffers. That's where the Tethered connection, I think, resonates the most, is that those who suffer and those who prosper are two sides of the same coin. You can never forget that. We need to fight for the less fortunate."

— Jordan Peele

== See also ==
- List of black films of the 2010s
- List of horror films of the 2010s
- Disability in horror films
