= Bart Edwards =

English actor (born 1989)

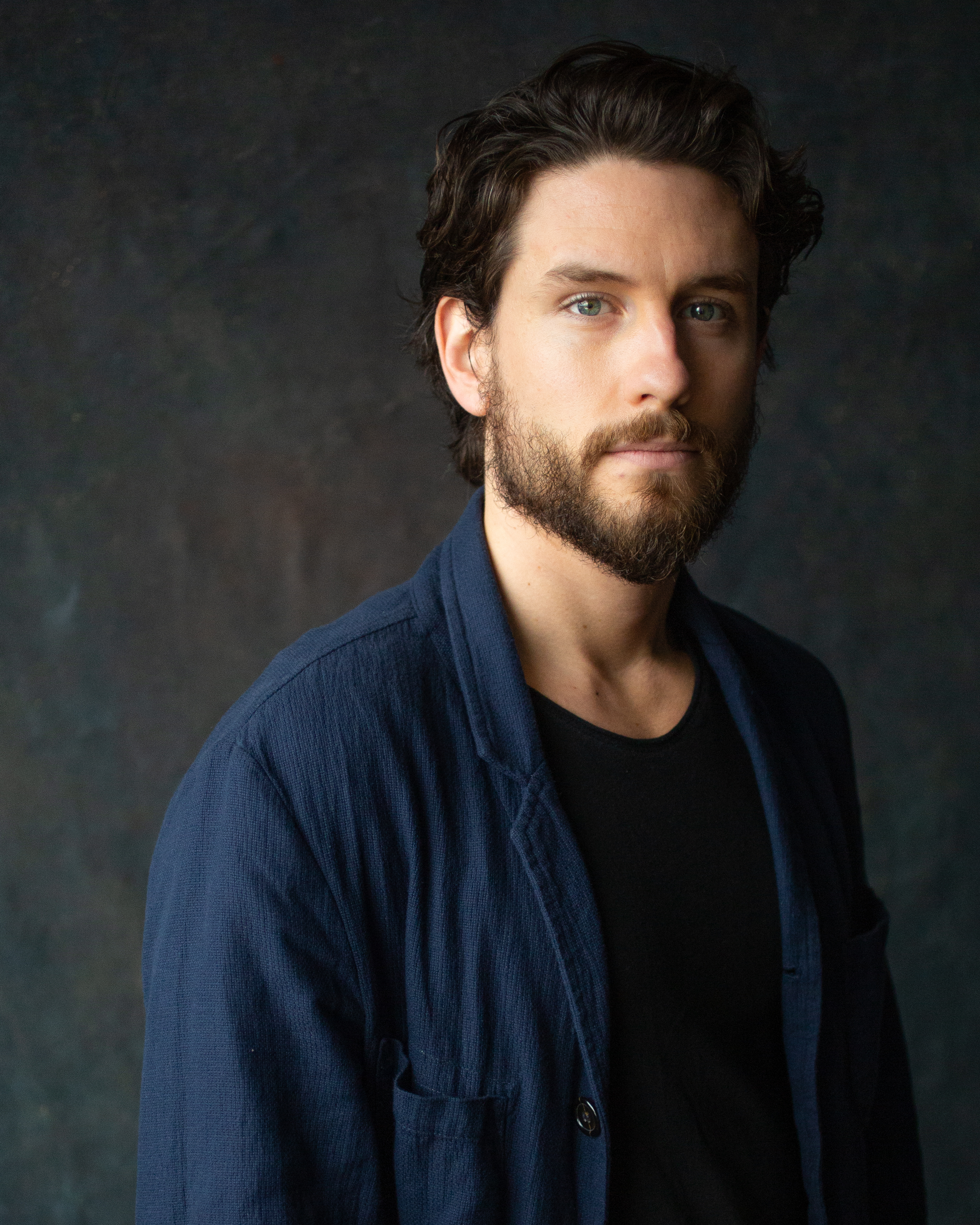
- Born: 1989 (age 36–37); Guildford, Surrey, England
- Occupation: Actor
- Years active: 2008–present

Bart Edwards (born 1989) is an English actor. He is known for playing the roles of Jasper Hunt in the Lifetime/Hulu drama series Unreal (2018), Jonathan Kay in the NRK drama Lykkeland (2018–2022), Duny / Emperor Emhyr var Emreis in The Witcher for Netflix (2019–present), and as Captain James Ehrendorf in the ITV six-part television drama series The Singapore Grip (2020).

== Early life ==
Bart Edwards was born in 1989 in Guilford, Surrey, England. He attended Tring Park School for the Performing Arts and then studied acting at the Bristol Old Vic Theatre School.

== Career ==
In 2008 Edwards began his career starring as Olly Greenwood on BBC's EastEnders. In 2012 he appeared in ITV's miniseries Leaving.

He appeared in two indie short films directed by Mark Lobatto: Silent Treatment in 2013, and Blue Borsalino in 2015.

In 2015 he appeared as Joe on Channel 4's Peep Show.

In 2016 Edwards had roles in Carnival Films' Call the Midwife for PBS/BBC, Stan Lee's Lucky Man, and Netflix/Channel 4's Fresh Meat.

He played roles in the Warner Bros. fantasy film Fantastic Beasts and Where To Find Them in 2016, and The Weinstein Company's biographical action-thriller film The Man with the Iron Heart in 2017.

In 2018 Edwards starred on season three of Lifetime's drama series Unreal in the role of Jasper Hunt, alongside Constance Zimmer and Shiri Appleby.

From 2018 to 2022, he starred as Jonathan Kay in the Norwegian series Lykkeland (also known as State of Happiness), which premiered at the first Cannes International Series Festival, winning two awards.

In 2019 he starred in Millennium Film's horror movie The Dare and appeared as Urcheon of Erlenwald / Duny / Emperor Emhyr var Emreis in The Witcher.

In 2020 Edwards was cast in the six-part television drama series The Singapore Grip, where he portrayed Captain James Ehrendorf.

From 2020 to 2022, he starred as Fredrik in the crime drama television series Young Wallander.

In 2022 Edwards appeared as Justin in the comedy drama television series The Flatshare.

== Filmography ==
=== Film ===
Year	Title	Role	Notes
2013	Silent Treatment	The Guy	Short film
2015	Blue Borsalino	Ernie	Short film
2016	Fantastic Beasts and Where to Find Them	Police Officer 2	
2017	The Man with the Iron Heart	Raf Man Halifax	
2019	The Dare	Jay Jackson	
2022	The Stranger in Our Bed	Ewan	
2024	Take My Hand	Jason	

=== Television ===
Year	Title	Role	Notes
2008	EastEnders	Olly Greenwood	10 episodes
2011	Casualty	Jamie	Episode: "Before the Fall"
2012	Leaving	Tom	Miniseries; 3 episodes
2015	Peep Show	Joe	4 episodes
2016	Call the Midwife	Denny Wray	Episode #5.1
2016	Stan Lee's Lucky Man	Finn Belman	Episode: "The Last Chance"
2016	Fresh Meat	Vod's Friend	Episode #4.1
2018	Unreal	Jasper Hunt	10 episodes
2018–2022	State of Happiness (Nor: Lykkeland)	Jonathan Kay	Main role, seasons 1–2
2019–present	The Witcher	Duny / Emperor Emhyr var Emreis	Main role, season 3-4; Guest, seasons 1–2
2020	The Singapore Grip	Captain James Ehrendorf	Main role
2020–2022	Young Wallander	Fredrik	7 episodes
2022	The Flatshare	Justin	6 episodes

=== Video games ===
Year	Title	Role	Notes
2026	007 First Light	Damien Webb	Voice
