= Spinning into Butter (film) =

Spinning Into Butter
- Promotional film poster
- Directed by: Mark Brokaw
- Written by: Rebecca Gilman; Doug Atchison
- Produced by: Roger Howe; Sarah Jessica Parker; Ryan Howe; Norman Twain; Daniel Hank
- Starring: Sarah Jessica Parker; Mykelti Williamson; Miranda Richardson; Beau Bridges
- Distributed by: Screen Media Films
- Release dates: August 20, 2007 (Montreal World Cinema Festival); March 2009 (United States)
- Country: United States
- Language: English

Spinning Into Butter is a 2007 drama film written by Rebecca Gilman and Doug Atchison and loosely based on Gilman's play of the same name. It was directed by first-time film director Mark Brokaw and produced by Sarah Jessica Parker, who also stars in the film.

Spinning Into Butter was sold for distribution Cannes Film Market on May 17, 2007 and opened in the U.S. in March, 2009. The film concerns political correctness and racial identity.

== Plot ==
When a New England liberal arts college experiences a hate crime against one of its few black students, the school's dean of students must respond publicly to the incident while privately confronting her own latent racism and prejudice.

== Cast ==
- Sarah Jessica Parker as Sarah Daniels
- Miranda Richardson as Catherine Kenney
- Beau Bridges as Burton Strauss
- Paul James as Simon Brick
- Mykelti Williamson as Aaron Carmicheal
- Victor Rasuk as Patrick Chibas
- Betsy Beutler as Lee

== Reception ==
As of March 2018, the review aggregator website Rotten Tomatoes reported that 16% of critics gave the film positive reviews, based on 32 reviews with an average score of 3.6/10. The site's consensus of reviews was, "Both leaden and stilted, Spinning Into Butter is an unsubtle drama with stagy direction and lackluster dialogue."
