= Kirby Bliss Blanton =

American actress

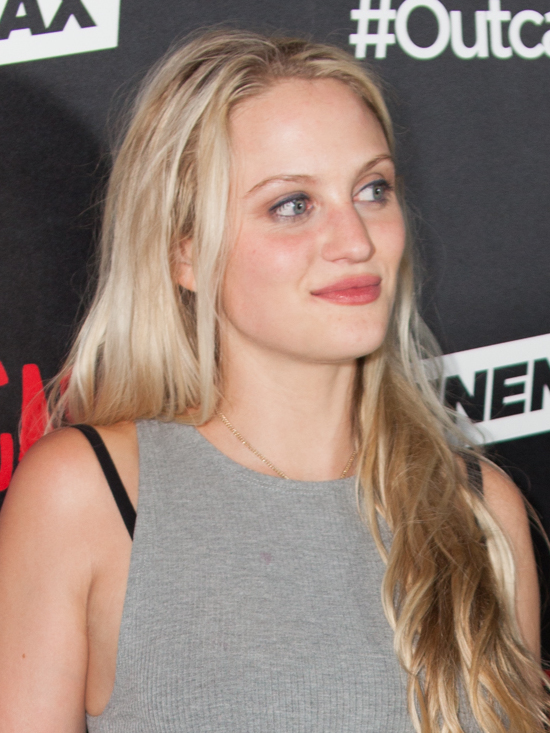
- Blanton in 2015
- Born: October 24, 1990 (age 36); The Woodlands, Texas, U.S.
- Occupation: Actress
- Years active: 2004-present

Kirby Bliss Blanton (born October 24, 1990) is an American actress. She is known for her roles as Kirby in the comedy film Project X and as Amy in the horror film The Green Inferno.

== Life and career ==
The youngest of four children, she grew up in The Woodlands, Texas, and started her career doing modeling and commercials in nearby Houston. After doing some month-long stints in Los Angeles, she moved there permanently with her mother. Her first acting role was in the Nickelodeon series Unfabulous in 2004. She also played small parts on shows such as Zoey 101 and Hannah Montana, and landed her first feature film role in 2007's horror film Scar. She later played Kirby in the 2012 comedy film Project X.

In 2014, it was announced that Blanton would be a featured model in Tyler Shields's photography exhibition Provocateur. In 2015, Blanton was named one of the top ten "Houston Scream Queens".

Her first name was given because her parents expected her to be a boy. Her middle name, Bliss, is her mother's maiden name.

== Filmography ==
Film roles
| Year | Title | Role | Notes |
|---|---|---|---|
| 2007 | Scar | Olympia Burrows | |
| 2008 | Ball Don't Lie | Jamie Smith | |
| 2012 | Project X | Kirby | |
| 2013 | The Green Inferno | Amy | |
| 2013 | Pacific Coast Haze | Piper | Short film |
| 2015 | Chainsaw | Maddy | Short film |
| 2016 | Hot Bot | Kassidy | |
| 2016 | Tell Me How I Die | Kristen | |
| 2016 | Recovery | Jessie | |
| 2018 | Death Wish | Bethany | |
| 2019 | Wish Man | Kitty Carlisle | |
| 2019 | Paint It Red | Nancy | |
| 2019 | Ring Ring | Amber | |
| 2021 | Final Frequency | Esther Dahiset | |
| 2023 | Replica | Sandy | |

Television roles
| Year | Title | Role | Notes |
|---|---|---|---|
| 2004–2005 | Unfabulous | Tiffany / Email Girl | 2 episodes |
| 2006 | Zoey 101 | Girl #2 | Episode: "Broadcast Views" |
| 2006 | Entourage | Amanda | Episode: "One Day in the Valley" |
| 2006 | Hannah Montana | Becca Weller | 2 episodes |
| 2012 | The Inbetweeners | Charlotte Allen | 2 episodes |
| 2015 | Hawaii Five-0 | Kaia | Episode: "Ka Papahana Holo Pono" |
| 2015 | Party Monsters | Elizabeth | Television film |
| 2016 | Suicide Note | Molly White | Television film (Lifetime) |
| 2017 | Killer Mom | Sydni Timmons | Television film (Lifetime) |
| 2017 | Blue & Green | Tera | Television film |
| 2020–2022 | The Young and the Restless | Lindsay | 7 episodes |
