= Richard Short (actor) =

English actor

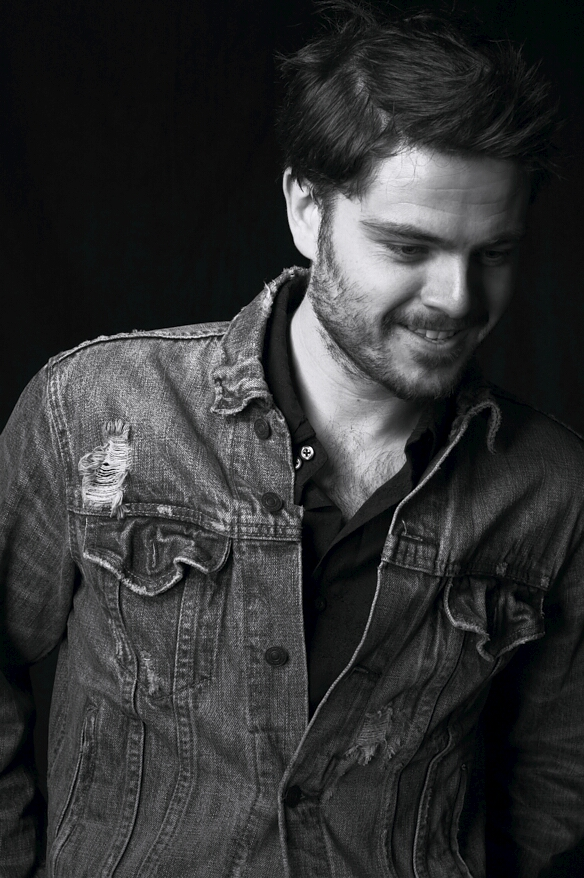
- Short circa 2006 or 2008
- Born: 8 October 1975 (age 50); South Shields, Tyne and Wear, England
- Occupation: Actor
- Years active: 1996–present
- Spouse: Teresa Palladino-Short (m. 2004)

Richard Ian Porterfield Short (born 8 October 1975) is an English actor based in Los Angeles. He is starring in the 2017 TV drama series Mary Kills People. In 2017 he appeared in the independent film The Dare and in 2016 Crazy Famous. On television he has had recurring roles on Vinyl and Covert Affairs and has appeared on American Horror Story, White Collar, and Blue Bloods. Short has appeared in more than 30 films and television shows in the US and UK. On Broadway, he was a member of the 2011 company of Jez Butterworth's Jerusalem at the Music Box Theatre.

In January 2018 Short was nominated for Best Lead Actor, Drama Series, from the Academy of Canadian Cinema & Television for his performance on Mary Kills People.

He began acting with the Woking Youth Theatre in Woking, Surrey in 1992, and made his professional stage debut in the original UK cast of Grease in 1996. His first American film was Delirious, directed by Tom DiCillo, in 2007. That same year also saw Short make his American TV debut on Law & Order: Criminal Intent. In 2009, he appeared in the big-budget crime drama Public Enemies, directed by Michael Mann. Short also appeared opposite Kevin Pollak in the 2011 film Choose and the HBO series Bored to Death with Jason Schwartzman.

== Early life ==
Short was born in South Shields, England, to Margaret Mooney and pipefitter Richard Short. He has two sisters, one half sister and one half brother. He grew up in South Shields and was educated at Highfield Infants School, then at the Cheviot Junior School; Broadmere Middle School, Woking; Holy Trinity School, Guildford, Surrey; Bishop David Brown School, Woking; and King Edward's School, Witley, Surrey. At Brooklands College, Weybridge, Surrey, he studied film and theatre, but left college to pursue acting full-time when he was 20 years old.

== Career ==
As a teenager Short joined the Woking Young Players and performed in several productions, including Ways and Means, Hair, The Boyfriend and many more. In 1996 Short began performing professionally on the stage as Johnny Casino in Grease. For two years he was in the UK tour of the original cast and appeared at the Opera House, Manchester, the Playhouse, Edinburgh, the Alexandra Theatre, Birmingham, the Mayflower Theatre, Southampton and the Empire Theatre, Liverpool. He then joined the production in the West End at the Cambridge Theatre, Covent Garden, London, until the show closed in 1999. Short was a part of the London Shakespeare Workshops from 1999 to 2001 and appeared in Hamlet, A Midsummer Night's Dream, Richard III and Twelfth Night with guests such as Sam West, Mark Rylance, Richard Dreyfuss and Fenella Fielding.

Short toured the UK in The Real Monty (as Nobby) from 2001 to 2002, Macbeth (as Macduff) from 2003 to 2004 and in A Midsummer Night's Dream (Demetrius) from 2003 to 2004. Short moved to the United States soon after.

In 2006 he landed his first American stage role, understudying the part of Sloane in the play Entertaining Mr. Sloane opposite Alec Baldwin, directed by Scott Ellis at the Roundabout Theatre. In 2007 Short appeared in the Vineyard Theatre's successful off-Broadway production of J.M. Barrie's Mary Rose, opposite Keir Dullea and Paige Howard, as an Australian World War I veteran.

He followed this with Wasps in Bed at Theatre Row and the successful Bay Street Theatre production of The Night Season opposite Katherine Helmond, Michael O'Keefe and David Patrick Kelly, directed by Lonny Price. In 2007 he was cast in his first American television show, Law & Order: Criminal Intent in the episode "Privilege".

Short broke into film with the acclaimed independent director Tom DiCillo in Delirious opposite Steve Buscemi and Alison Lohman. The film debuted at the 2007 Sundance Film Festival. Short was back at Sundance the following year in The Guitar, directed by Amy Redford. He returned to the television screen in both New Amsterdam in the episode "A Soldier's Heart" and Law & Order: Special Victims Unit in the episode "Avatar". He adopted an American accent in 2008 in both The King of Shadows by Roberto Aguirre-Sacasa at the Working Theatre and Choose. For the 1930s crime drama Public Enemies, Short had to adopt an American accent to play FBI agent Samuel P. Cowley, the man who brought down Baby Face Nelson, played by Stephen Graham. Short worked with Christian Bale, who stars as agent Melvin Purvis.

In the spring of 2009 he wrapped Cafe, a feature film directed by Marc Erlbaum and shot in Philadelphia. Short plays a writer opposite star Jennifer Love Hewitt. Cafe was released in the US and Europe in 2011. Short was in the feature film The Exhibitionists for director Michael Melamedoff, released in 2013. In 2014 he was cast in three independent films: Cockroaches in Los Angeles and The Butterflies of Bill Baker and A New York Love Story, shot in New York City.

Short starred as gay priest Peter Simmons in the 2023 film Mysterious Ways.

Short is represented by Innovative Artists and manager Jennifer Wiley-Stockton.

=== Writing ===
Short became the football writer during the 2010 FIFA World Cup exclusively for Menshealth.com. Articles can be found at: Hearst Magazines

=== Advertising ===
Short has worked on several commercials in the UK and Ireland, as well as recorded voiceovers and jingles. Among his commercial credits:

- 2000 "Home" (Director: Syd McCartney)
- 2002 "Pay Attention or Pay The Price" campaign

== Personal life ==
Short is married to Teresa Palladino-Short. They reside in Los Angeles.

Short has run in several marathons and half-marathons to raise money for charity, such as:

- 2005 New York Marathon, New York
- 2003 Great North Run, Newcastle upon Tyne
- 2003 Great South Run, Portsmouth

In football, he supports Sunderland A.F.C. and South Shields F.C.

== Filmography ==
| Year | Title | Role | Notes |
|---|---|---|---|
| 2007 | Delirious | Jace Hipley | Sundance 2007; American Film Debut |
| 2007 | Deception | Desk Clerk | Directed by Marcel Langenegger |
| 2008 | The Guitar | Loser Musician | Sundance 2008; Directed by Amy Redford |
| 2009 | Public Enemies | Samuel P. Cowley | Directed by Michael Mann |
| 2009 | Choose | Benson | Directed by Marcus Graves |
| 2011 | Cafe | Writer | Producers Sean Covel, Chris Wyatt and J. Andrew Greenblatt |
| 2012 | The Exhibitionists | Walter Todd | Directed by Michael Melamedoff |
| 2013 | The Butterflies of Bill Baker | Mac | Directed by Sania Jhankar |
| 2015 | A New York Love Story | The Painter | Directed by Apolla Echino |
| 2015 | Cockroaches | Johnny Slim | Directed by Christoffer Aldell |
| 2015 | Not Welcome | Terry | Directed by Marc Sloboda |
| 2016 | Crazy Famous | Smith | Directed by Paul Jarrett |
| 2017 | The Dare | Adam Heinz | Directed by Giles Alderson |
| 2020 | Arthur & Merlin: Knights of Camelot | King Arthur | Directed by Giles Alderson |
| 2021 | The Tragedy of Macbeth | Siward | Directed by Joel Coen |
| 2023 | Mysterious Ways | Peter Simmons | Directed by Paul Oremland |

== Television ==
| Year | Title | Role | Notes |
|---|---|---|---|
| 2007 | Law & Order: Criminal Intent | Dylan Mercer | Episode "Privilege" |
| 2007 | Law & Order: Special Victims Unit | Erik Winton | Episode "Avatar" |
| 2008 | New Amsterdam | Robert Camp | Episode "A Soldier's Heart" |
| 2009 | Bored to Death | Vincent | HBO series written by Jonathan Ames; executive producer Troy Miller |
| 2009 | Fringe | Bob Dunn | Episode "Midnight" |
| 2010 | Blue Bloods | Lemon | Episode "After Hours" |
| 2010 | Gravity | Spin Guy | Episode "Damn Skippy" |
| 2011 | White Collar | Andrew Collins | Episode "What Happens in Burma" |
| 2011 | Vera | Neville Furness | Episode "The Crow Trap" based on the book by Ann Cleeves. Produced by ITV Studios. |
| 2011 | American Horror Story | Gary | Episode "Rubber Man" |
| 2013 | 666 Park Avenue | Harlan Moore | Recurring Episodes |
| 2013 | Covert Affairs | Reese | Recurring Episodes |
| 2015 | Agent Carter | Percival "Pinky" Pinkerton | Episode "The Iron Ceiling" |
| 2016 | Vinyl | Billy McVicar | Recurring Episodes |
| 2016 | Training Day | Wikstrom | One episode |
| 2016 | Time After Time | Harper | One episode |
| 2017–2019 | Mary Kills People | Desmond "Des" Bennett | Series regular |
| 2018 | Code Black | Drake Finn | One episode |
| 2022 | Jack Ryan | Scott Harris | episodes 1-3 |

== Theatre ==
| Year | Title | Role | Director | Playwright | Theatre |
|---|---|---|---|---|---|
| 1996 | Grease | Johnny Casino | David Gilmore | Jim Jacobs/Warren Casey | UK Tour |
| 1999 | Grease | Johnny Casino | David Gilmore | Jim Jacobs/Warren Casey | Cambridge Theatre, Covent Garden |
| 2000 | Millennium Dome Show | Actor | Mark Fisher | Peter Gabriel (composer) | Millennium Dome, Greenwich |
| 2001 | The Real Monty | Nobby | David Graham | | UK Tour |
| 2003 | Macbeth | Macduff | Julian Chenery | William Shakespeare | UK Tour |
| 2003 | A Midsummer Night's Dream | Demetrius | Julian Chenery | William Shakespeare | UK Tour |
| 2006 | Entertaining Mr. Sloane | Sloane (understudy) | Scott Ellis | Joe Orton | Roundabout Theatre Company, NYC |
| 2006 | WASPS in Bed | Cal | Lisa Marie Meller | Nicola Behrman | Samuel Beckett Theatre, NYC |
| 2006 | An Evening with Simon Gray | Japes | Simon Gray | Simon Gray | Lincoln Center |
| 2007 | The Night Season | John Eastman | Lonny Price | Rebecca Lenkiewicz | Bay Street Theatre, Sag Harbor, NY |
| 2007 | Mary Rose | Harry | Tina Landau | J.M. Barrie | Vineyard Theatre, NYC |
| 2008 | Mister Roberts | Wiley/Gerhart | Scott Ellis | Thomas Heggen/Joshua Logan | (Roundabout Theatre Company staged reading) American Airlines Theatre |
| 2008 | King of Shadows | Eric Saunders | Connie Grappo | Roberto Aguirre-Sacasa | Theater for the New City, NYC |
| 2011 | Jerusalem | Danny Whitworth | Ian Rickson | Jez Butterworth | Music Box Theatre, NYC |
| 2018 | Cleo | Richard Burton | Bob Balaban | Lawrence Wright | Alley Theatre, Houston |
| 2024 | The Hills of California | Bill / Mr Halliwell | Sam Mendes | Jez Butterworth | Broadhurst Theatre, NYC |
