= Sean Covel =

American film producer (born 1976)

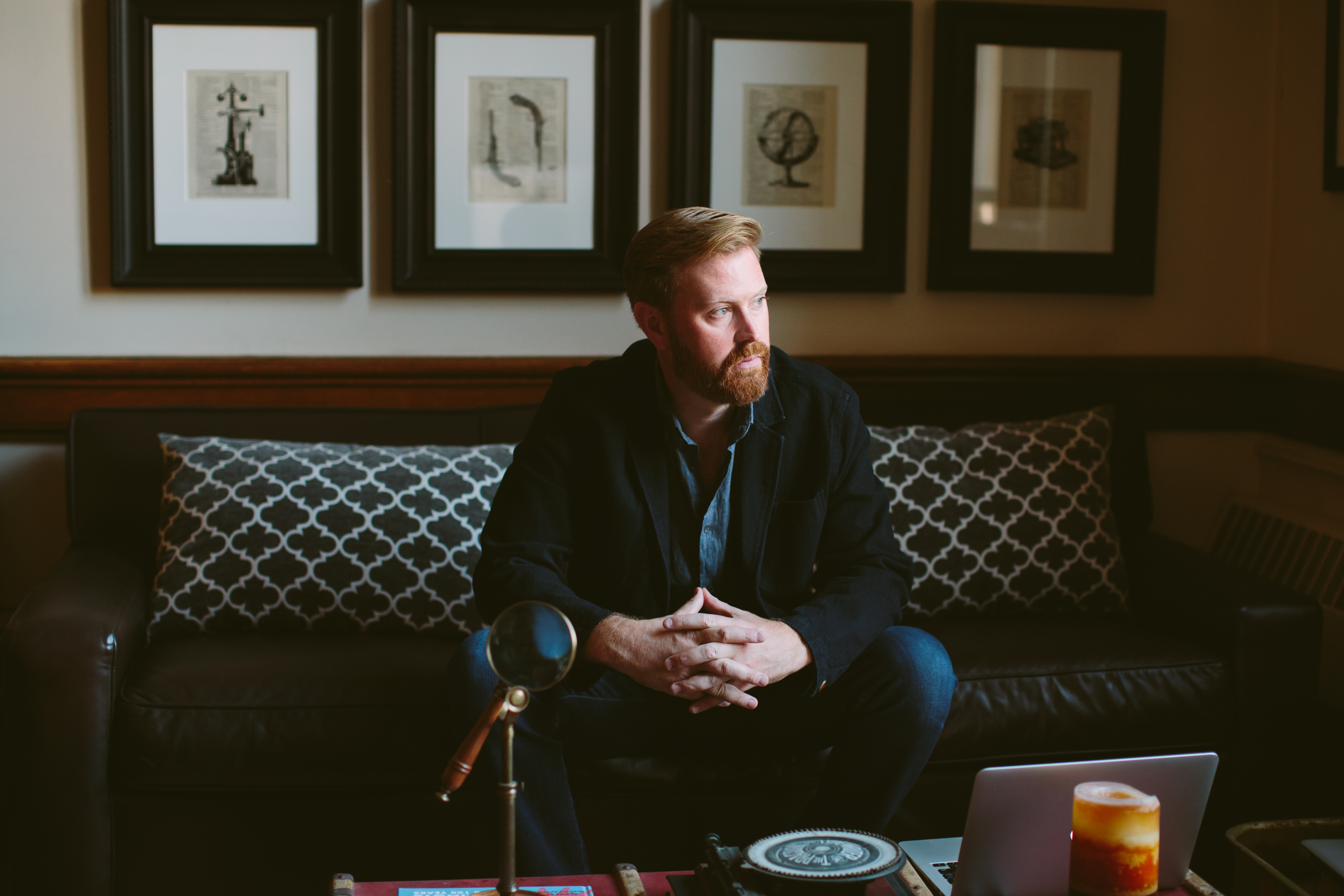
- Born: Sean Covel; March 4, 1976 (age 50); Newcastle, Wyoming
- Other name: Sean C. Covel
- Occupations: Film producer, Writer
- Years active: 2004–present

Sean C. Covel (born March 4, 1976) is an American film producer, writer, educator and philanthropist. He is best known for being a producer of the 2004 American independent coming-of-age comedy film Napoleon Dynamite.

== Early life and education ==
Covel was born in Newcastle, Wyoming, and grew up in Edgemont, South Dakota.

He attended undergraduate college at the University of Nebraska, Kearney, majoring in Broadcast Management with a minor in acting.

Covel received a Master of Fine Arts from the University of Southern California School of Cinematic Arts, Peter Stark Producing Program.

== Career ==
=== Early career ===
Following his bachelor's degree, Covel took a position as an executive headhunter in San Francisco and eventually opened his own firm. He would later sell the firm and attend the Peter Stark Producing Program, graduating with a Master of Fine Arts in 2002. After graduation, he worked at the Creative Artists Agency in Beverly Hills, California.

=== Film and television career ===
In 2003, Covel joined the team writing and producing Napoleon Dynamite. Napoleon Dynamite was released in 2004 and received critical acclaim and market success. Covel and fellow producer of the film Chris Wyatt, were nominated for the Producer Award at the 20th Independent Spirit Awards for their work on the film. His second film which he produced, The 12 Dogs of Christmas, a period family film, was released the same year.

His third film, Think Tank was released in 2006.

Beneath, his fourth film, a horror film starring Nora Zehetner was released in 2007.

Covel was an executive producer for the 2009 American-Australian drama film Broken Hill starring Timothy Hutton, Luke Arnold and Alexa Vega. The same year, he was featured in the 2009 documentary film Don't You Forget About Me about screenwriter, director, and producer John Hughes.

In 2010, he was a producer of the psychological drama film Café starring Jennifer Love Hewitt.

Covel was a co-producer of the 2012 Fox animated television series Napoleon Dynamite, based on the film of the same name that he was also a producer of. The same year, he worked as a production consultant on the political drama film The Citizen.

In 2013, he was a producer of the action/comedy film Concrete Blondes starring Diora Baird and Samaire Armstrong.

Covel served as the executive producer of the 2014 documentary film Driving Blind. The same year, he worked as a creative consultant on the animated film The Clockwork Girl based on the comic book series of the same name.

In 2017, Covel was a producer of the heist film Carter & June starring Michael Raymond-James, Samaire Armstrong, and Timothy Omundson. The same year, he served as an executive producer of the film Tater Tot & Patton.

Covel has also made appearances on television in award shows such as the Independent Spirit Awards, the MTV Movie & TV Awards, and the Sundance Film Festival. He has appeared on the television game show The Price Is Right.

=== Academic career ===
In 2011, Covel joined the faculty of University of Southern California School of Cinematic Arts, his alma mater. There, he occasionally lectures on film producing, story development, and industry innovation.

=== Public speaking career ===
Covel is also a public speaker.

In 2019, Covel gave a TED talk entitled “The Mind is a Computer. The Question is How,” on the mental framework of problem-solving.

=== Literary career ===
==== Porter The Hoarder ====
In 2019, Covel partnered with illustrator Rebecca Swift to launch a series of look-and-find children's books under the title Porter the Hoarder. The first book, Porter the Hoarder and the Ransacked Room, was a bestseller in 2019. The series went on to include six additional titles.

==== Marlon McDoogle's Magical Night ====
In 2019, Covel wrote the Christmas-themed children's book Marlon McDoogle's Magical Night set on a magical train that explores the importance of family and the power of self-actualization. Diego Velasquez was the illustrator for the book.

The book was well received, garnering awards including in the categories of Children's Fiction, Illustration, Inspirational and 3rd place overall at the 2020 Next Generation Indie Book Awards.

===== Muffle Your Snuffle =====
In 2020, Covel wrote a book titled Muffle Your Snuffle that teaches children how to sneeze.

==== Who is the Super Ultra Mega Special Super Special Guest? ====
In 2024, Covel wrote a book titled Who is the Super Ultra Mega Special Super Special Guest? in partnership with the South Dakota Statewide Family Engagement Center (SDSFEC). The project aimed to increase family engagement in early education by providing first-grade students with a free interactive book designed to be read alongside their parents.

The story follows a playful, choose-your-own-adventure-style format, guiding readers through humorous and chaotic attempts to prepare for a surprise visitor. Each scenario leads to either a fun disaster or a successful visit, with the final twist revealing that the special guest is the reader themselves. In an interview with Rapid City Journal, Covel revealed that the message is meant to emphasize to children that they are important, seen, and valued.

A follow-up book titled Your Super Ultra Mega Special Kindergarten Year! was released in 2025.

The Super Ultra Series, as it is known, centers around his dog, Tim Finnegan, who is the main character.

== Philanthropy ==
=== 12 days of Pizza ===
In 2015, he founded a children's charity, 12 Days of Pizza, which works annually with Pizza Ranch to help low-income elementary school children eat during school holiday periods. It started with 144 meals being provided to 12 families. Within a three-year period, the program grew to provide over 12,000 meals to over 1000 food-insecure families with elementary school aged children. The program continues to expand each year. In March 2020, the program was reinstated to provide thousands of meals to families during COVID as schools shut down.

=== Porter The Hoarder ===
In 2019, the Porter the Hoarder series became the centrepiece of a charitable program with United Way of the Black Hills, a non-profit organization in Rapid City, South Dakota under a division of a non-profit organization called Black Hill Reads.The partnership saw over 2000 books given to elementary school children in the Black Hills area in January 2019.

Following the success of this initiative, the S.D. Statewide Family Engagement Center (SDSFEC) became involved with the series, using the books as a vehicle for promoting more active engagement from children and their parents in literature and literacy. As part of the partnership, over 60,000 more students received books.

Porter the Hoarder is used in family engagement projects in South Dakota, North Dakota, Montana, and Utah.

Additional books in the Porter the Hoarder series have been used in community projects.

Porter the Hoarder, The Nature Explorer is used in child and family wellness projects in association with the United Way of The Black Hills.

Porter the Hoarder and the Hospital Hijinks is used by the Monument Health Rapid City Hospital in Rapid City where doctors visit classrooms to read to students and gift free books and stethoscopes.

=== Who is the Super Ultra Mega Special Super Special Guest? Literacy Project ===
In 2024, Covel co-created a family engagement campaign using a new book titled Who is the Super Ultra Mega Special Super Special Guest? The project, done in partnership with the South Dakota Statewide Family Engagement Center (SDSFEC) aimed to increase family engagement in early education by providing first-grade students with a free interactive book designed to be read alongside their parents.

As part of the campaign, Covel visited schools across the state to read the book with students and encourage family participation. The campaign distributed over 8,000 copies of the book statewide to first-grade students in year 1, with each child receiving their own copy to take home.

In 2025, the project expanded to serve families with kindergarten students using a new book; Your Super Ultra Mega Special Kindergarten Year.

=== 12 Days of Doing Bicycle Project ===
In 2023, Covel launched a volunteer-driven initiative called 12 Days of Doing, a multi-stage service project series. The inaugural project focused on refurbishing and donating children's bicycles.

The project was held in partnership with Countryside Church, a church in Spearfish, South Dakota and the Spearfish Bicycle Collective, a community organization from the area. The event brought together local volunteers to repair more than 60 donated bikes, many of which were given to children receiving their first bicycle.

Volunteers of all skill levels were invited to participate, including those with no prior mechanical experience. In addition to the community repair event, school guidance counselors were consulted to help identify children who would benefit most from receiving a bike.

The broader mission of 12 Days of Doing is to provide consistent, scalable models for local engagement, empowering volunteers to use their skills and time to directly benefit their communities.

=== Barn Burner ===
In 2025, he launched the Barn Burner Campaign, a public safety initiative to combat drink spiking and sexual assault in bars. The campaign seeks to activate protective instincts in men to aid in women's safety.

The campaign centers around Western-themed posters placed in bar restrooms. These posters outline behavioral red flags of potential drink spiking, such as rapid intoxication, confusion, or emotionlessness, and encourage bystanders to intervene. A complementary poster for women uses the code phrase "Angel Shot".

Although the project started in Deadwood, South Dakota, it has been planned to be implemented in other areas in the State as well as other States in the United States.

== Personal life ==
Covel was married to actress Alexa Vega from 2010 to 2012. The two parted amicably with Covel tweeting congratulations to her and her new husband, Carlos PenaVega at the time of the couple's engagement.

== Filmography ==
=== Films ===
Year	Title	Role	Distributor	Notes
2004	Napoleon Dynamite	Producer	Searchlight Pictures; Paramount Pictures; MTV Entertainment Studios	Nominated for the Producer award at the 20th Independent Spirit Awards
2004	The 12 Dogs of Christmas	Producer		Winner of Best Picture at the Heartland International Film Festival
2006	Think Tank	Producer	CF Entertainment	
2007	Beneath	Producer	Paramount Vantage	
2009	Don't You Forget About Me	Interviewee	Alliance Films	Documentary film about John Hughes
2009	Broken Hill	Executive Producer	Lionsgate Canada	American-Australian film
2011	Café	Producer	Nationlight Productions	
2012	The Citizen	Production Consultant	Monterey Media	
2013	Concrete Blondes	Producer	20th Century Fox	
2014	Driving Blind	Executive Producer		
2017	Carter & June	Producer and also appears as the character Outlaw Red		
2017	Tater Tot & Patton	Executive Producer	Giant Pictures	

=== Television ===
Year	Title	Role	Television Network	Notes
2005	20th Independent Spirit Awards	Himself	IFC	Nominated for the Producer Award for Napoleon Dynamite
2005	2005 MTV Movie Awards	Himself	MTV	
2006	2006 Sundance Film Festival	Himself	Sundance TV	
2006	The Price is Right	Himself	CBS	
2012	Napoleon Dynamite (TV series)	Co-Producer	Fox	
2014	The Clockwork Girl	Creative consultant	Super Channel	

== Bibliography ==
=== Porter The Hoarder ===
- Porter The Hoarder and the Ransacked Room (2019)
- Porter The Horder, The Nature Explorer (2019)
- Porter The Hoarder and Pappy's Perfect Pizza Party (2019)
- Porter The Hoarder and the Halloween Happening (2019)
- Porter The Hoarder and the Alphabet Adventure (2021)
- Porter The Hoarder and the Magical Mayhem (2021)
- Porter The Hoarder and the Hospital Hijinks (2021)

=== Other work ===
- Marlon McDoogle's Magical Night (2019)
- Muffle Your Snuffle (2020)
- Who is the Super Ultra Mega Special Super Special Guest? (2024)
- Your Super Ultra Mega Special Kindergarten Year! (2025)

== Awards and nominations ==
Year	Award	Category	Work	Result	Notes
2005	20th Independent Spirit Awards	Producer Award	Napoleon Dynamite	Nominated	Shared with Chris Wyatt
2020	2020 Next Generation Indie Book Awards	Grand Prize Winner in the Fiction Category	Marlon McDoogle's Magical Night	Won	

== See also ==
- Napoleon Dynamite
- Chris Wyatt
