= 20th Independent Spirit Awards =

US film awards ceremony in 2005

- Date: February 26, 2005
- Site: U.S.
- Hosted by: Samuel L. Jackson

Highlights
- Best Film: Sideways
- Most awards: Sideways (6)
- Most nominations: Sideways (6)

The 20th Independent Spirit Awards, honoring the best in independent filmmaking for 2004, were announced on February 26, 2005. It was hosted by Samuel L. Jackson.

== Nominees and winners ==
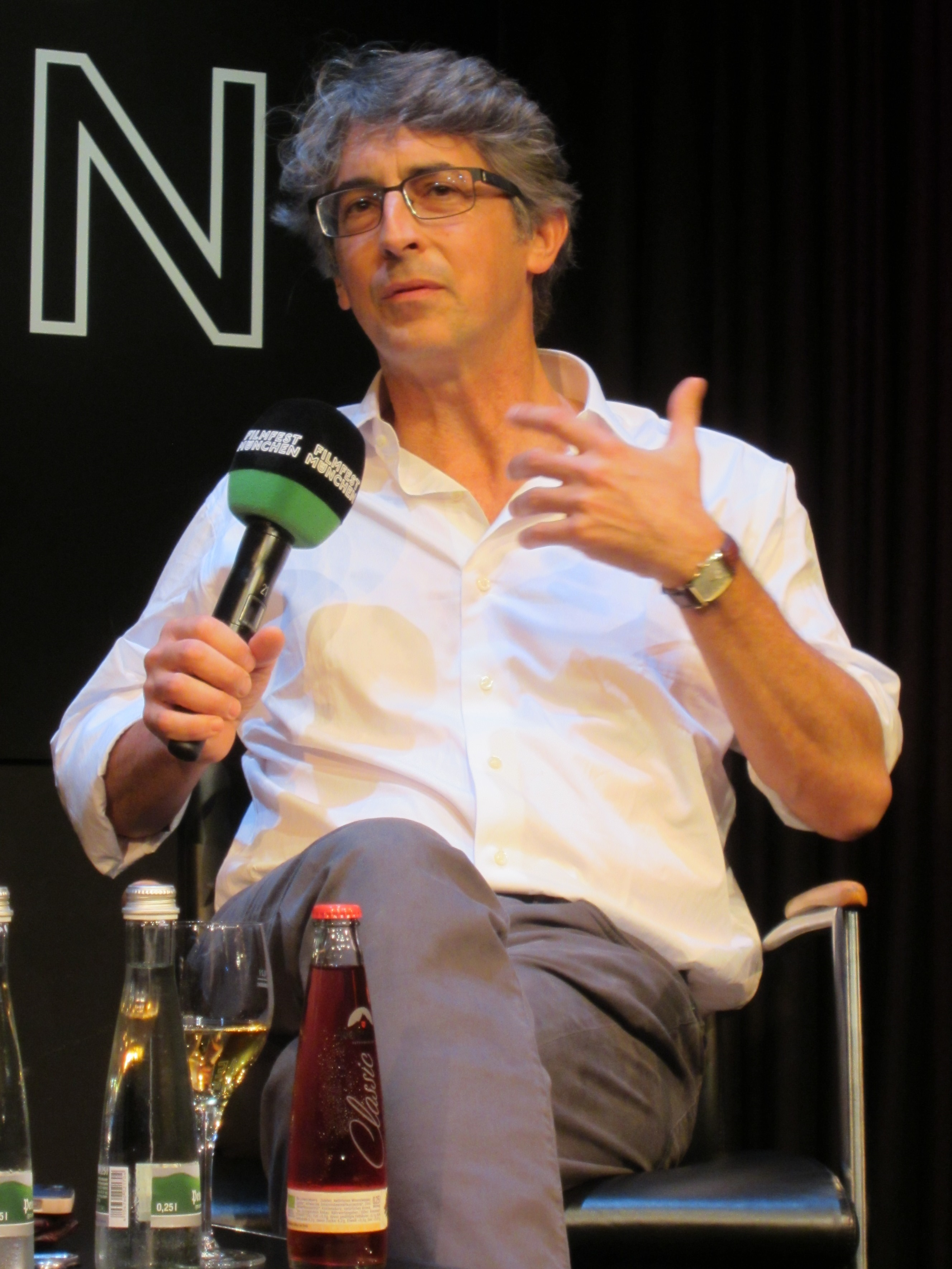
Alexander Payne, winner of Best Director and co-winner of Best Screenplay

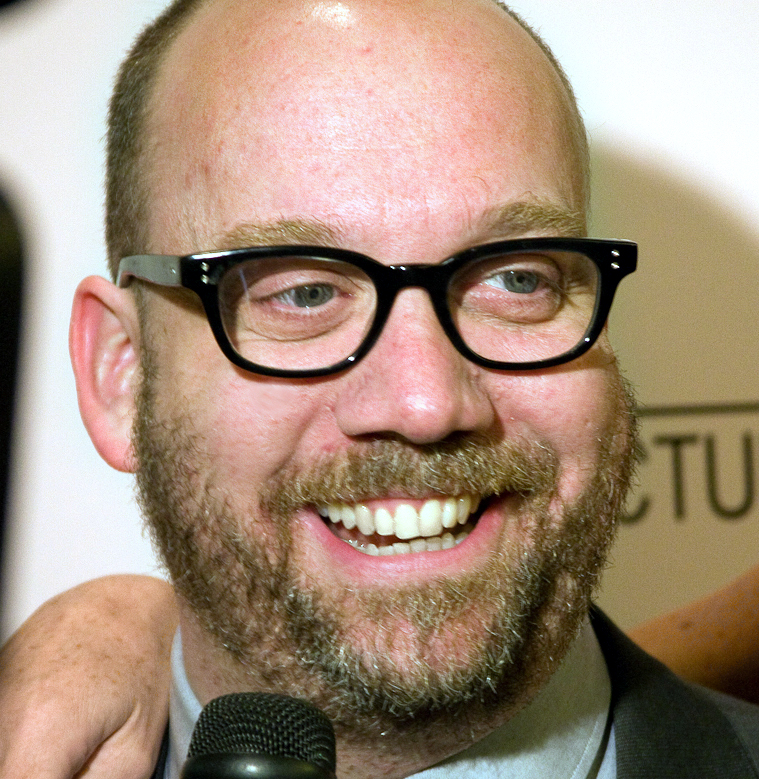
Paul Giamatti, winner of Best Male Lead

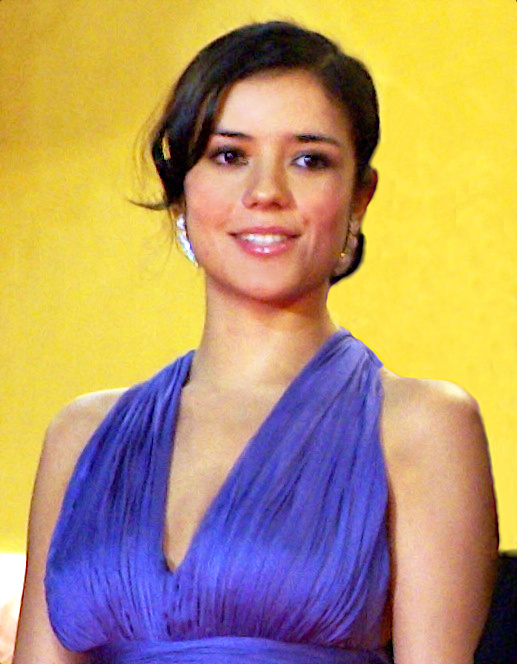
Catalina Sandino Moreno, winner of Best Female Lead

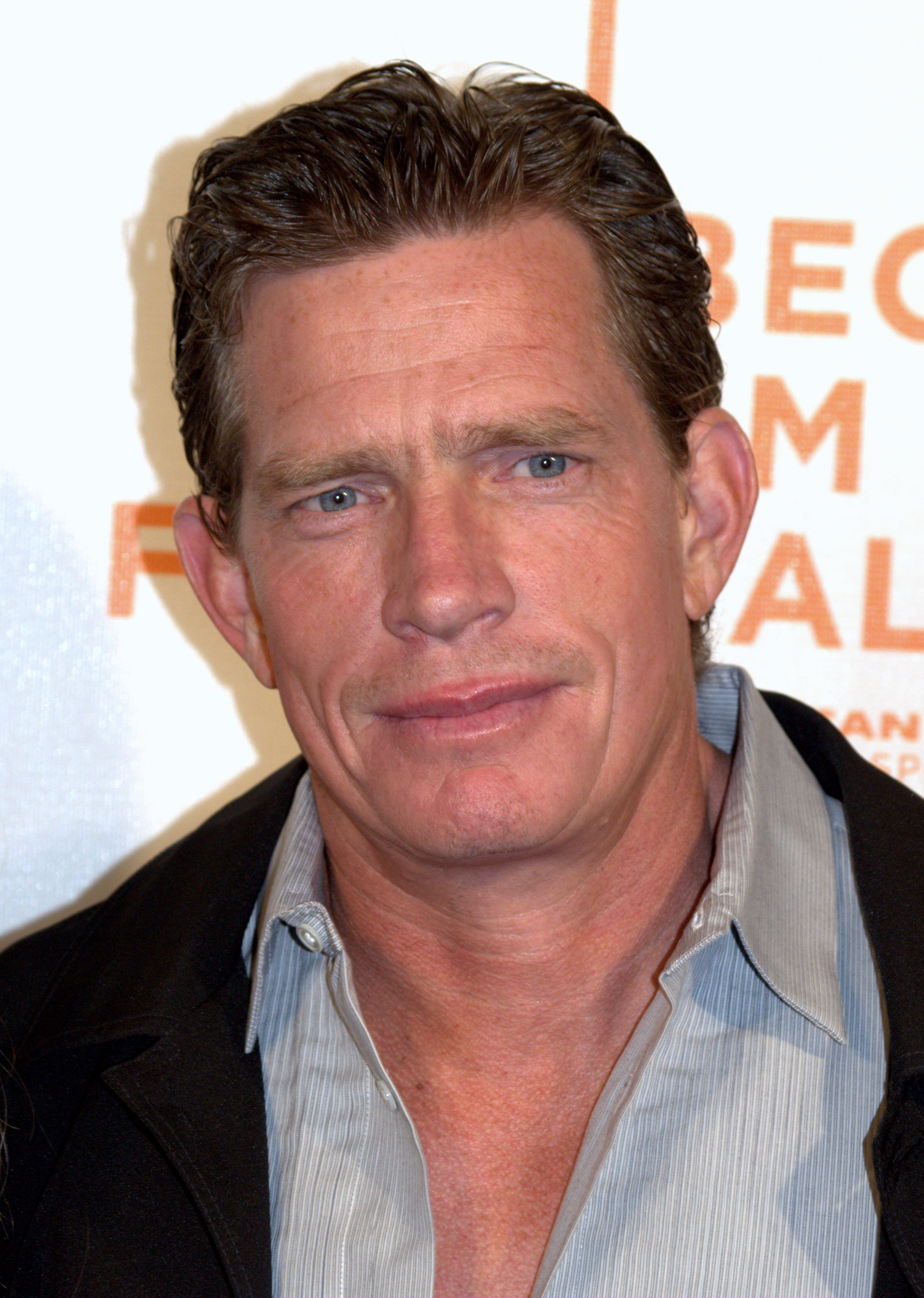
Thomas Haden Church, winner of Best Supporting Male

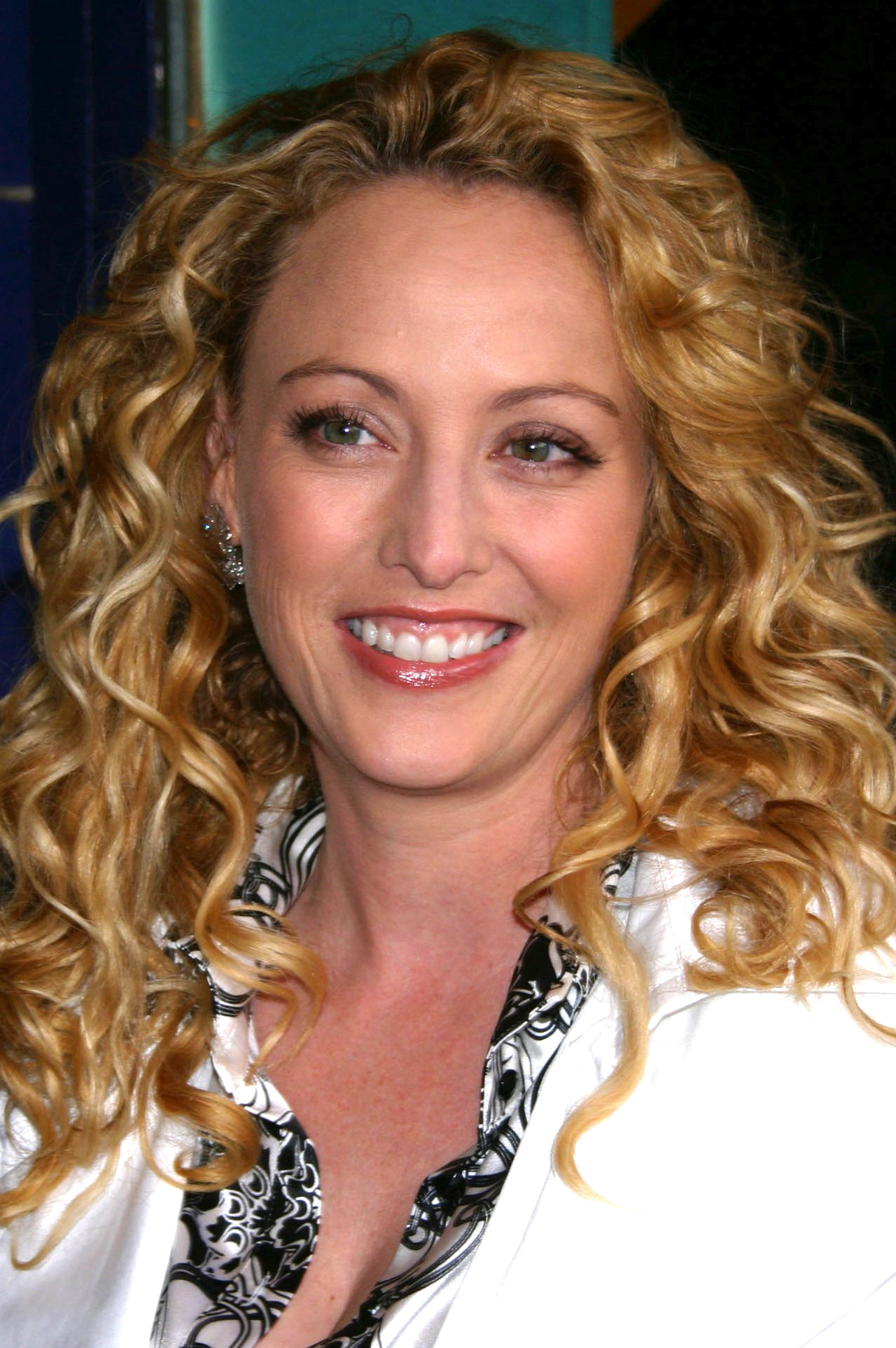
Virginia Madsen, winner of Best Supporting Female

Best Feature	Best Director
Sideways: Baadasssss!; Kinsey; Maria Full of Grace; Primer	Alexander Payne – Sideways: Shane Carruth – Primer; Joshua Marston – Maria Full of Grace; Walter Salles – The Motorcycle Diaries; Mario Van Peebles – Baadasssss!
Best Male Lead	Best Female Lead
Paul Giamatti – Sideways: Kevin Bacon – The Woodsman; Jeff Bridges – The Door in the Floor; Jamie Foxx – Redemption; Liam Neeson – Kinsey	Catalina Sandino Moreno – Maria Full of Grace: Kimberly Elise – Woman Thou Art Loosed; Vera Farmiga – Down to the Bone; Judy Marte – On the Outs; Kyra Sedgwick – Cavedweller
Best Supporting Male	Best Supporting Female
Thomas Haden Church – Sideways: Jon Gries – Napoleon Dynamite; Aidan Quinn – Cavedweller; Roger Robinson – Brother to Brother; Peter Sarsgaard – Kinsey	Virginia Madsen – Sideways: Cate Blanchett – Coffee and Cigarettes; Loretta Devine – Woman Thou Art Loosed; Robin Simmons – Robbing Peter; Yenny Paola Vega – Maria Full of Grace
Best Screenplay	Best First Screenplay
Sideways – Alexander Payne and Jim Taylor: Baadasssss! – Mario Van Peebles and Dennis Haggerty; Before Sunset – Richard Linklater, Julie Delpy and Ethan Hawke; The Door in the Floor – Tod Williams; Kinsey – Bill Condon	Maria Full of Grace – Joshua Marston: Brother to Brother – Rodney Evans; Garden State – Zach Braff; Primer – Shane Carruth; Robbing Peter – Mario F. de la Vega
Best Cinematography	Best Debut Performance
The Motorcycle Diaries – Eric Gautier: Dandelion – Tim Orr; Redemption – David Greene; Saints and Soldiers – Ryan Little; We Don't Live Here Anymore – Maryse Alberti	Rodrigo de la Serna – The Motorcycle Diaries: Anthony Mackie – Brother to Brother; Louie Olivos Jr. – Robbing Peter; Hannah Pilkes – The Woodsman; David Sullivan – Primer
Best First Feature (Over $500,000)	Best Documentary
Garden State: Brother to Brother; Napoleon Dynamite; Saints and Soldiers; The Woodsman	Metallica: Some Kind of Monster: Bright Leaves; Chisholm '72: Unbought & Unbossed; Hiding and Seeking: Faith and Tolerance After the Holocaust; Tarnation
Best International Film
The Sea Inside • Spain: Bad Education • Spain; Oasis • South Korea; Red Lights • France; Yesterday • South Africa

== Special awards ==
=== John Cassavetes Award ===
Mean Creek

- Down to the Bone
- On the Outs
- Robbing Peter
- Unknown Soldier

=== Truer Than Fiction Award ===
Born into Brothels

- Chisholm '72: Unbought & Unbossed
- Control Room
- Farmingville

=== Producers Award ===
Gina Kwon – The Good Girl, Me and You and Everyone We Know and The Motel

- Danielle Renfrew – November and Groove
- Sean Covel and Chris Wyatt – Napoleon Dynamite and Think Tank

=== Someone to Watch Award ===
Jem Cohen – Chain

- Bryan Poyser – Dear Pillow
- Jennifer Reeves – The Time We Killed

=== Special Distinction Award ===
- The ensemble cast of Mean Creek: Rory Culkin, Ryan Kelley, Scott Mechlowicz, Trevor Morgan, Josh Peck and Carly Schroeder

=== Films with multiple nominations and awards ===
==== Films with multiple nominations ====
Nominations	Film
6	Sideways
5	Maria Full of Grace
4	Brother to Brother
4	Kinsey
4	Primer
4	Robbing Peter
3	Badasssss!
3	The Motorcycle Diaries
3	Napoleon Dynamite
3	The Woodsman
2	Cavedweller
2	The Door in the Floor
2	Down to the Bone
2	Garden State
2	On the Outs
2	Redemption
2	Saints and Soldiers
2	Woman Thou Art Loosed

==== Films with multiple wins ====
Awards	Film
6	Sideways
2	Maria Full of Grace
2	Mean Creek
2	The Motorcycle Diaries
