= Two's Company =

Two's Company may refer to:

== Film and television ==
- Two's Company (film), a 1936 British comedy
- Two's Company (musical), a 1952 American musical revue
- Two's Company (Australian TV series), a 1959–1961 variety series
- Two's Company (British TV series), a 1975–1979 sitcom
- "Two's Company" (Doctors), a 2004 TV episode

== Music ==
- Two's Company (Cliff Richard album), 2006
- Two's Company (Joe Albany and Niels-Henning Ørsted Pedersen album), 1974
- Two's Company (Maynard Ferguson and Chris Connor album), 1961
