= Barry Quin =

Australian actor

- Born: Barry Quin; 1949 (age 76–77); England, United Kingdom
- Education: Royal Central School of Speech and Drama
- Occupation: Actor
- Years active: 1968–1989; 1992–present
- Spouse: Peta Toppano (m. 1979; div. 1989)

Barry Quin (born 1949) credited also as Barry Quinn, is a British-Australian actor and briefly producer who has appeared on stage and in television and film. He is best known for his role as an original cast member of TV series Prisoner, playing Dr. Greg Miller.

== Biography ==
A graduate of the Royal Central School of Speech and Drama in London, Quin was primarily a stage actor in his early career. After a small role in the British television series Just William in 1977, he had bit parts in the UK sitcom Two's Company and US drama series Charlie's Angels.

He was touring Australia as part of a stage production of Othello when he met his future wife Peta Toppano. While auditioning for Prisoner, Toppano suggested Quin for the role of Greg Miller, when she learned the producer was looking for an actor to play a young prison doctor. Both their characters were introduced with the storyline of the two having had a prior relationship as old university sweethearts. Shortly after the series debuted, they were married in April 1979. The two remained on the series until the end of the 1979 season, when they were written out for their characters too, to be married.

In 1980, he would star in the television miniseries Lucinda Brayford co-starring Wendy Hughes and Sam Neill and, the following year, in Sara Dane. He appeared in a number of television series including MPSIB and Carson's Law. Although having minor roles in I Can't Get Started and Departure, he had moderate success as Lt. Zachariah Hicks in the 1987 television miniseries Captain James Cook, followed by Emma: Queen of the South Seas (1987) and Cappuccino (1989), in which he was also credited as an associate producer.

After Darlings of the Gods (1989), Quin took a leave of absence from acting, coinciding with his divorce from Peta Toppano. He returned to acting three years later with a guest appearance on Police Rescue and Mission Top Secret. Before long, he began playing recurring characters on Big Sky and Mirror, Mirror II. He also made guest appearances on Murder Call, Water Rats, Sir Arthur Conan Doyle's The Lost World, The Secret Life of Us, Love My Way and All Saints.

In April 2002, Quin also returned to the stage performing as Gordon in David Williamson's Soulmates at the Sydney Opera House. After a cameo appearance as a news anchorman in Superman Returns (2006), He made several appearances as Geoff Olivetti in Home and Away between 2006 and 2009.

Quin also played the character Professor Sorvad in the 2011 Australian comedy movie Dealing with Destiny.

He also played Phil in two episodes of the YouTube web series The Horizon in 2013.

== Filmography ==
=== Film ===
Year	Production	Role	Type
1977	No Appointment Necessary	Nicholas Hodgekiss	Film
1985	I Can't Get Started	John	Feature film
1986	Departure	Jack	Feature film
1988	Emma: Queen of the High Seas	The Hon. W.H. Lyttelton	
1989	Darlings of the Gods	Dan Cunningham	TV movie
1989	Cappuccino	Larry	Feature film
1993	Corrupt Justice	Julian Roberts	TV movie
2003	Subterano		Feature film
2006	Superman Returns	News Anchor #5	Feature film
2008	Disgrace	Desmond Swarts	Feature film
2011	Dealing with Destiny	Professor Sovad	Feature film
2013	Battle Ground	Dr. Bennett	
2014	John Doe: Vigilante	Dr Keith Simms	Feature film
2017	Dance Academy: The Movie	Competition Judge	Feature film
2017	2.22	Samuel Keifer	Film
2018	Skinford: Chapter Two	The Tailor	

=== Television ===
Year	Production	Role	Type
1972	Kate	Tony Graham	TV series, 9 episodes
1973	Harriet's Back in Town	Tarquin Melville	TV series, 8 episodes
1973	Crime of Passion	Marcel Verenne	TV series
1975	Ten from the Twenties	Hugh Garthorne	TV series
1977	Just William	Ward Hadlow	TV series
1977	Jubilee	Francis Considine	TV series
1978	Two's Company	Greg	TV series
1978	Charlie's Angels	Ed Jarvis	TV series
1979	Salvage 1	Engineer	TV series
1979	Skyways	Jeremy Drake	TV series
1979-80	Prisoner	Dr. Greg Miller	TV series
1980	Lucinda Brayford	Hugo Brayford	TV miniseries
1981	Jacqueline Susann's Valley of the Dolls	Messenger	TV miniseries
1982	Sara Dane	Richard Barwell	TV miniseries
1983	Carson's Law		TV series
1982-83	MPSIB	S.C. Gary Manore	TV series
1988	Australians	Private Kingsley	TV series
1988	Captain James Cook	Lt. Hicks	TV miniseries
1992	Police Rescue	Mr. Scanlon	TV series
1995	G.P.	David Harding	TV series
1995	Mirror, Mirror	Gervaise de Luttrelle	TV series
1995	Mission Top Secret	Thornton	TV series
1997	Big Sky	Simon Kroger	TV series
1998	Murder Call	Dr. Charles Stark	TV series
1997-2001	Water Rats	Raffe Johanssen / David Faraday	TV series
2001	Ihaka: Blunt Instrument	Andrew	TV movie
2002	The Lost World	Lionel Huxley	TV series
2004	Jessica	McDonald	TV miniseries
2005	The Secret Life of Us	Hunter Davies	TV series
2006	Love My Way	Derek	TV series
2002-09	All Saints	Dr. Simon Byrne / Andy's Father	TV series
2006-09	Home and Away	Dr Phillip Grigg / Dr. Geoff Olivetti	TV series
2009	The Horizon	Phil	TV series
2010	Rake	Dalton	TV series
2017	A Place to Call Home	Neil O'Sullivan	TV series

== Personal life ==
Quin was married to his Prisoner co-star Peta Toppano in 1979, but they divorced after ten years. He has since remarried.
