= Clayton D. Moss =

Australian actor and writer (born 1980)

- Born: Clayton Douglas Moss; 25 June 1980 (age 46); Sydney, Australia
- Occupation: Actor
- Website: claytonmoss.com

Clayton D. Moss (born 25 June 1980) is an Australian actor and author, born in Sydney, Australia.

== Acting career ==
=== Television ===
Clayton's television credits include episodes of All Saints (2008), Underbelly (2009), and Rescue: Special Ops (2010).

=== Film ===
Moss made his feature film debut in 2011 with Dealing with Destiny alongside Luke Arnold. In a review for the film, Filmink magazine noted him as one of "Australia's emerging acting talent".

=== Theater ===
Moss performed at Belvoir St. Downstairs Theatre for the play MATE. He was also cast in Devil May Care's production of John Donnelly's Songs of Grace and Redemption for The Sydney Fringe in 2010, receiving favorable reviews for his performance of the character Steve. He returned to the Sydney Fringe in 2016 to perform Sarah Kane's Crave to similar critical reception.

== Filmography ==
=== Film ===
Year	Film	Role	Notes
2006	Backflip	Jeremy Von Pearljam	
2009	Silver and Gold	Phil	
2009	Hegira	-	Animator / Director
2010	Lady Luck	Waiter	Also assistant director
2010	Awake	Ben	
2010	My Two Lives	-	Screenwriter
2011	Dealing with Destiny	Lloyd	
2012	Now What...	Peter	
2013	Manos Arriba	Bandit 1	
2016	Drunk	Steve	
2016	The Chicken Men	Chad	
2019	Only Love Can Do This to Me	Traffic Police	
2021	Julia	Jeremy	
2023	Vector	Dr. Alex Murdoch	
2023	Archipelago	Nathan	Also director & producer
2024	Bully	Dad	Also writer & producer
2024	Love Over Money	Adult John	Documentary
TBC	Nomad	ER Doctor	Post-production
TBC	Turning	Lead Guitarist	Post-production

=== Television ===
Year	Title	Role	Notes
2008	All Saints	Eddie MacKinley	TV series, 2 episodes
2009	Underbelly	Young Detective	TV series
2010	Rescue: Special Ops	Motorcyclist	TV series
2014	Home and Away	Police Officer	TV series
2017	Murder Uncovered	Peter Forsyth	TV miniseries
2018	Abandoned	Zack	
2019	Deadly Women	Detective	TV series
2021	Australian Gangster	Male Detective (Long Bay)	TV miniseries
2023	Ten Pound Poms	Port Official	TV series, 2 episodes
2024	Paper Dolls	Paparazzi	TV series

== Theatre ==
Year	Title	Role	Notes
2009	Mate	Jim Harris	Downstairs Belvoir
2010	Songs of Grace and Redemption	Steve	Sydney Fringe Festival
2016	Crave	A	Sydney Fringe Festival

== Bibliography ==
Title	Year	Type	Note
Anōmalía	2019	Short story collection/Speculative Fiction	
