= Cappuccino (film) =

- Directed by: Anthony Bowman
- Written by: Anthony Bowman
- Produced by: Anthony Bowman; Sue Wild
- Starring: Jeanie Drynan; Rowena Wallace; John Clayton; Barry Quin; Ernie Dingo
- Music by: William Motzing
- Production company: Archer Films Entertainment
- Release date: December 1989
- Country: Australia
- Language: English
- Box office: AU $42,100 (Australia)

Cappuccino is a 1989 Australian comedy film about out of work actors.

== Plot ==
The film tells the story of several actors who are friends. Max drives a cab and is trying to become a stand up comic. Maggie and Annie try to get acting roles. Larry works on a soap opera.

Max finds a video tape in his cab with some incriminating information. He dates a young actor, Celia, who dumps him and ends up with Larry.

== Cast ==
- Jeanie Drynan as Maggie
- Rowena Wallace as Annie
- John Clayton as Max
- Barry Quin as Larry
- Ernie Dingo as Self
- Ritchie Singer as Bollinger

== Production ==
Antony Bowman (husband of Jeanie Drynan) approached the four main actors and the heads of department of the crew, maintaining that he could raise enough money to make the film if each of them became a producer, working for expenses only, taking equal points in the project, to which they agreed. He raised money from investors to film the movie then take it to fine cut. The Australian Film Commission provided investment to complete the film.

Bowman based the script on the lives of actors he knew.

== Reception ==
The Canberra Times called it "featherweight because of the lack of substance in its plot. This is not to say that it lacks comic bite."

Filmnews called the movie "adventurous in the way it pushes formal structure and works on a number of different levels" as an ensemble character piece, a thriller and a tribute to acting. However the reviewer felt it "doesn't quite come off. The timing of its comic effects is not quite precise enough, the exploration of character is not quite insightful enough, interchanges are not as sharply scripted as they should be, and the sometimes slack direction and muddy photography just fails to convey the sort of pace and joy that a movie like this needs."

Shelley Kay wrote in Cinema Papers that "There is so much happening in Cappuccino conversations: love affairs, chaos, investigations and intrigues, comedy, statements about the state of Sydney theatre, murder, pornography, prison and coffee. So much happens that nothing really happens. This film is flawed by its random devitalisation and a lack of focused energy."

== See also ==
- Cinema of Australia
