= Stretch Armstrong and the Flex Fighters =

Animated television series

- Armstrong with his companions Omni-Mass (left) and Wingspan (right)
- Genre: Superhero Action
- Based on: Stretch Armstrong by Hasbro
- Developed by: Kevin Burke; Victor Cook; Chris "Doc" Wyatt
- Voices of: Scott Menville; Steven Yeun; Ogie Banks; Wil Wheaton; Kate Mulgrew; Nazneen Contractor; Felicia Day; Keith David; Miguel Ferrer; David Kaye
- Theme music composer: Michael Tavera
- Opening theme: "Stretch Armstrong and the Flex Fighters" by Holy White Hounds
- Composer: The Outfit
- Country of origin: United States
- Original language: English
- No. of seasons: 2
- No. of episodes: 23 (+1 special)

Production
- Executive producers: Victor Cook; Kevin Burke; Chris "Doc" Wyatt; Stephen Davis; Edward Horasz; Andy Yeatman
- Producer: Vincent Aniceto
- Editors: Mark T. Collins; Aeolan Kelly; Bryan Tuck
- Running time: 22–23 minutes
- Production company: Hasbro Studios

Original release
- Network: Netflix
- Release: November 17, 2017 – September 7, 2018

Stretch Armstrong and the Flex Fighters is an American animated television series produced by Hasbro Studios and distributed by Netflix. It is based on the 1970s action figure Stretch Armstrong. The Netflix series features a brand new superhero universe, new characters, new villains, and new lore. The series was developed by executive producers Kevin Burke, Victor Cook, and Chris "Doc" Wyatt.

Victor Cook also oversaw the series as supervising director, Burke and Wyatt as story editors.

Burke and Wyatt also wrote a tie-in comic book for IDW Publishing. The first season was released on Netflix on November 17, 2017. The second season was released on September 7, 2018 and ended on a cliffhanger.

== Plot ==
Jake Armstrong, Nathan Park, and Ricardo Perez were three ordinary teenagers living in the technological hub Charter City until they were doused in a substance known as Flexarium, during an accident. Their newfound superpowers garnered the attention of Jonathan Rook, the CEO of Rook Unlimited and benefactor to Charter City himself.

Rook offers them their freedom from the authorities over the accident in exchange for enlisting the trio as Charter City's superhero team known as the Flex Fighters. Agreeing on the terms that Rook and everyone else won't know their real identities, Jake becomes Stretch, Nathan becomes Wingspan, and Ricardo becomes Omni-Mass.

In their first days as superheroes, the Flex Fighters receive hard training from Malcolm Kane (Rook's second-in-command) while fighting against numerous villains including Stretch Monster, who benefices many of them, and also shared a past with Dr. Racine Cleo / Dr. C (Rook's former mentor) and her ninja companion Riya Dashti / Blindstrike (Stretch's classmate and love interest). In their last mission, the Flex Fighters discover in horror that Jonathan Rook and Stretch Monster are the same person and therefore, he has been their enemy the whole time. Rook intends to use Dr. C's work, primarily her "HyperFlexarium" formula, to create an army of monsters and conquer the world. Using the data from all the times the trio were in action, he successfully begins creating his forces, but the Flex Fighters destroy them and the equipment Rook used to make them, and with the help of Dr. C and Blindstrike escape from Rook, but he then frames them in public for the rampage his monsters caused in the city. With the city under Rook's control and its citizens being turned against them, the Flex Fighters decide to join forces with Dr. C and Blindstrike in order to expose Rook's crimes and clear their names.

In season two, now that Rook has fooled all of Charter City into thinking the Flex Fighters are now bad guys, the Flex Fighters work with Dr. C and Blindstrike to fight Rook's mercenaries while working to clear their name. At the end of the season, they must also join forces with Rook to deal with Malcolm Kane when the Tech Men attack.

== Characters ==
=== Heroes ===
- Stretch / Jake Armstrong (voiced by Scott Menville) – Jake Armstrong is an over-scheduled high school student who is exposed to experimental chemicals that gives him super-stretching abilities.
- Wingspan / Nathan Park (voiced by Steven Yeun) – Nathan Park is a high school student with a large family and is Jake's best friend who is also exposed to the same experimental chemicals, and gains the ability to flatten his body from the neck down to gain gliding suit-like wings.
- Omni-Mass / Ricardo Perez (voiced by Ogie Banks) – Ricardo Perez is the new, hotshot kid at Jake and Nathan's high school whom they befriend. Like Jake and Nathan, Ricardo is also exposed to the same experimental chemicals, and gains the ability to change his size and mass.
- Dr. C / Racine Cleo (voiced by Kate Mulgrew) – Dr. Racine Cleo is a scientist who mentored Jonathan Rook. She faked her disappearance in hopes to stop her former protégé from taking over the world. She appears to be an antagonist of the Flex Fighters in the first season, but becomes their mentor in the second.
- Blindstrike / Riya Dashti (voiced by Nazneen Contractor as a teenager, Kathreen Khavari as a child) – Riya Dashti is an Indian-American student and classmate of the Flex Fighters who is secretly a ninja warrior working with Dr. C. She later reveals her parents worked with Dr. C before Stretch Monster killed them by sabotaging Dr. C's plane to crash on the Pearl Islands.
- Erika Violette (voiced by Felicia Day) – A classmate of the Flex Fighters and Nathan's love interest. She becomes the team's ally after Nathan tells her the truth in "Dr. Dreamscape" and actively assists them in "Riya's Revenge." She later gets energy powers and a purple energy form capable of flight in the season 2 finale.

=== Villains ===
- Stretch Monster / Jonathan Rook (voiced by Wil Wheaton in human form, Miguel Ferrer in monster form in 2017, David Kaye in monster form in 2018) – Jonathan Rook is the CEO of Rook Unlimited and the benefactor behind the Flex Fighters. Unbeknownst to them until the season 1 finale, Rook is secretly Stretch Monster, an elastic creature who is also a benefactor to the criminal kind. Near the end of season 2, Stretch Monster had to work with the Flex Fighters to fight a common foe in the Tech Men.
- Tech Men - Formerly known as the Epsilon Society, they are an evil organization. At an earlier life, Jonathan Rook wanted to join the Epsilon Society only to change his mind when he didn't want to sacrifice his family and his identity. After the Epsilon Society was disbanded, some of its members came back together as the Tech Men where their cult-like aura had them believing that they are the true handlers of technology.
  - Number One / Malcolm Kane (voiced by Keith David) – Malcolm Kane is the head of security for Rook Unlimited and the former mentor to the Flex Fighters. It is revealed that he is the leader of the Tech Men who was aware of Rook's double life.
  - Number Six (voiced by Luke Arnold) – Vice Commander of the Tech Men.
  - Number Twenty-Four (voiced by Ian Hopps) - A member of the Tech Men who ends up in the hospital in season 1, but is revived in season 2 "Rise of the Tech-Men" by Number Six. Prior to falling comatose, he informs Stretch that he is the only one that can save the city.
- Multi-Farious / Donald "Don" Robertson (voiced by Jon Heder) – Dr. Don Robertson is a former employee of Rook Unlimited that became mutated into a granite monster that can multiply at will. He gets cured of his mutation in the interactive special and its canon two-part episode version "The Breakout" by a serum Rook made in the warehouse where Don and the Flex Fighters first got their powers. In the interactive version, his other fates would have him either killed by acid or getting stuck in cement.
- Circuit-Stream (voiced by James Arnold Taylor) – An expert hacker who can phase through walls and control any electronic equipment.
  - Brute - Circuit-Stream's pet gecko.
- The Freak Sisters / Kari and Mari Freak (both voiced by Grey Griffin) – Kari and Mari Freak are a pair of twin sister criminals who wear helmets that give them Flexarium tentacles. They also use Flexarium-based weapons to commit crimes.
- Smokestack / Jack Kinland (voiced by Clancy Brown) – Jack Kinland is the former lead crime boss in Old Town who ran the Made Men and was serving a life sentence. He becomes a smoke-induced criminal who gained his Flexarium from Stretch Monster. As Smokestack, he can solidify and transform into a cloud of smoke.
- Mickey Simmons (voiced by Henry Rollins) – Kane's former gang partner and the leader of the Stick Shifts. He holds a grudge on him due to leaving and joining with Rook Unlimited.
- Madam Tousant (voiced by Vanessa Marshall) – A gang boss who leads a team of older, yet very powerful women called the Sables.
- Quick Charge / Sarah Kamen (voiced by Yvette Nicole Brown) – Dr. Sarah Kamen is the former head of Harkness General energy company. She gains electricity powers that she can skate on and tries to put Rook out of business.
- Mechanica / Santos (voiced by Tia Carrere) – Officer Santos is a member of Rook's security team who was a victim in the fight in Rook Tower between the Flex Fighters and Stretch Monster. She is converted into a vengeful, deadly cyborg by Rook.
- Dr. Dreamscape / Jason "Jay" Michaels (voiced by Michael Ross) – Jay Michaels is a spiritual master with enhanced telepathic abilities that allow him to hypnotize others by trapping them in a sleep state and manipulating their dreams.
- The Gentleman (voiced by Eric Bauza) – A mysterious mercenary with good manners. He wears a robotic suit that enhances his strength and agility.
- Anastasia (voiced by Tara Strong) – A hybrid between a flower and an artificial intelligence who was created by her creator and "father" Oleg Savic.

=== Supporting ===
- Mark Armstrong (voiced by Gary Cole) – Jake's father who is Rook Unlimited's top researcher.
- Sandy Violette (voiced by Kath Soucie) - Erika's mother.
- Gabe-Farious / Gabe Bannerman (voiced by Josh Keaton) – Gabe Bannerman is a conceited classmate of the Flex Fighters who briefly dated Erika and becomes jealous of Nathan when he begins to date her. In the second season, he is briefly transformed into the new Multi-Farious, as Gabe-Farious. Every duplicate of him is unstable, resulting in each having a different personality and being at risk of exploding. This was stopped when Wingspan finds a piece of his true personality and cures him.
- Miya Kimanyan (voiced by Kelly Hu) – A local news reporter based in Charter City.
- Kyle "King Jock" (voiced by Josh Keaton) – Kyle is a classmate of the Flex Fighters and somewhat of a bully.
- Grace Lidstrom (voiced by Kelly Hu) – An employee of Rook's who manages the Flex Fighter's online presence.
- Grandpa Park (voiced by Sab Shimono) – Nathan's wise grandfather who came to learn about his grandson's secret. Grandpa Park used to be a working reporter.
- Isabelle Park (voiced by Stephanie Sheh) – Nathan's younger sister.
- Officer Reynolds (voiced by Will Friedle) – Kane's sarcastic second-in-command, who leads a special ops team under Rook's employ. He is later promoted to head of security of Rook Unlimited at the end of the second season only to be replaced by Rook's Hyper-Flexarium test subject and confidant.
- Biomass / Oleg Savic (voiced by Walter Koenig) – Oleg Savic is the Flex Fighters' botany teacher. In the second season, he was temporarily able to transform into a plant monster that was super strong and could control vines as weapons.
- Malouf (voiced by Eric Bauza) – A short-tempered classmate of the Flex Fighters.
- Brick and Mortar (voiced by Wayne Knight and Troy Baker respectively) – Two misunderstood scientists. Brick possesses gauntlets that send shock waves while Mortar possesses a gun that sprays a liquid that makes solid objects temporarily malleable. They are later hired by Rook Unlimited.

== Production ==
Stretch Armstrong was originally released in 1976 by Kenner Products. In 1987, Kenner was acquired by Tonka, which was later acquired together in 1991 by Hasbro. All of rights to Kenner's products were transferred to Hasbro in 2000, when the latter shut down Kenner's office.

There have been several attempts to adapt the property into a television series or film, with the latter, as a live-action film, have failed attempts by Disney (in 1994), Universal (in 2008) and Relativity Media (in 2012). Originally announced and developed as a live-action series starring a teenage version of the 1970s superhero, the idea was eventually retooled as an animated series targeted to children before bringing in Cook as producer, based on his work with The Spectacular Spider-Man TV series. Shortly thereafter, Burke and Wyatt were hired to produce and write. The series was designed to have episodic stories that also serialize into a larger plot over the course of the first season's 26 episodes. The first footage from the series was shown at HasCon on September 10, 2017.

The series is animated by Digital eMation in South Korea.

== Episodes ==
=== Series overview ===
Series overview
Season	Episodes	Originally released
1	13	November 17, 2017
Special	1	March 13, 2018
2	10	September 7, 2018

=== Season 1 (2017) ===
No. overall	No. in season	Title	Directed by	Written by	Original release date	Prod. code
1	1	"Confessions of a Teenage Superhero"	Victor Cook	Kevin Burke and Chris "Doc" Wyatt	November 17, 2017	101
In the futuristic Charter City, high school students Jake Armstrong, Nathan Park and Ricardo Perez accidentally break into Rook Unlimited, owned by industrialist and Charter City benefactor Jonathan Rook. The three are dosed with Flexarium, a malleable and powerful material, and gain elastic based superpowers. While fleeing from the authorities, the three take on disgruntled Rook employee Dr. Don Robertson who has transformed into a strange monster dubbed Multi-Farious.
2	2	"Pulled in Every Direction"	Victor Cook	Kevin Burke and Chris "Doc" Wyatt	November 17, 2017	102
Rook, impressed with Jake, Nathan and Ricardo's heroics, decides to hire them as Charter City's official superhero team, The Flex Fighters. The team decide to keep their identities secret, even from Rook, as they gain the codenames Stretch, Wingspan and Omni-Mass. Robertson, who escaped their fight from the previous episode, is still on the loose and the Flex Fighters must prove that they can handle the situation, though Malcolm Kane, Rook's head bodyguard and chief of security, doesn't think they are up to the challenge.
3	3	"Ninja and the Ghost"	Kevin Altieri	Kevin Burke and Chris "Doc" Wyatt	November 17, 2017	103
During a demonstration, Blindstrike attacks Rook Unlimited forcing the Flex Fighters to defend the facility. Jake does some investigating and discovers that Blindstrike is in league with Rook's former partner and co-founder Dr. Racine Cleo (Dr. C for short) who was long thought to be dead. Meanwhile, Nathan and Ricardo begin having issues when the latter's jock like attitude gets on the former's nerves.
4	4	"Online Presence"	Frank Paur	Eugene Son	November 17, 2017	104
Villain Circuit-Stream plans to hack into Rook's satellite to release everyone's personal information. He gets help from the mysterious Stretch Monster who gives him a serum that gives him technopathic abilities and wreaks havoc across Charter City. The Flex Fighters in the meantime must also deal with their online presence when on the FlexFighterNet, users begin to rate the heroes causing Ricardo to have a huge ego and decides to live stream their current mission.
5	5	"Stretchipedes"	Phil Weinstein	Rob Hoegee	November 17, 2017	105
After a disastrous mission involving the Freak Sisters, Kane gives the Flex Fighters 48 hours to decide who should be the leader creating competition between them. Rook creates new robotic drones called stretchipedes to help out in various situations. The drones prove to be more useful than the heroes, but they soon become unstable and attack the Flex Fighters due to secretly being controlled by Stretch Monster.
6	6	"The Gangs of Old Town"	Kevin Altieri	Josh Haber	November 17, 2017	106
"Smokestack" Jack Kinland is given smoke based powers by Stretch Monster and decides to start a turf war in Old Town, the original Charter City. The Flex Fighters are convinced by Rook to try to be more close with Kane. However, Kane is revealed to have a past connected to Kinland and he finds himself brought back into the fray when his old gang the Stickshifts re-recruit him to help take down Kinland and his new army.
7	7	"Fast Times"	Frank Paur	Brian Hohlfeld	November 17, 2017	107
The Flex Fighters face a new threat in the form of Quick Charge, a villain with electricity powers. She is actually Dr. Sarah Kamen and blames Rook for knocking her out of the energy business and plots revenge by destroying his generators. Meanwhile, Jake attempts to ask out his crush Riya Dashti and Nathan and Ricardo discover that the former's grandfather knows that they are actually the Flex Fighters.
8	8	"Lie Sandwich"	Victor Cook	Mark Hoffmeier	November 17, 2017	108
Jake feels guilty about not telling his father about his double life as Stretch. The Flex Fighters are once again pitted against Blindstrike who scans a map of the Pearl Islands, the known location where Dr. C's plane went down and where the formula for her Hyperflexarium is located. However, when Jake misses a parent-teacher conference, he is grounded forcing Nathan and Ricardo to do the mission alone.
9	9	"Singularity Event"	Kevin Altieri	Kevin Burke and Chris "Doc" Wyatt	November 17, 2017	109
While battling minor, misunderstood crooks Mortar and Brick, Jake is sprayed with an unknown substance that makes him lose control of his powers. Rook asks for a sample of the substance to be taken back so that he can make a cure. In the meantime, Jake has Ricardo pick up Riya for the dance and the two end up bonding over mutual interests. Nathan and Erika spend time together after the latter's date turns out to be narcissistic.
10	10	"Crisis at the Cleo"	Frank Paur	FM De Marco	November 17, 2017	110
While on a school field trip at the Cleo Museum, a group of special op criminals called the Tech Men arrive to steal a valuable mineral called Prolotite. Jake, Ricardo and Nathan find themselves in a difficult situation of trying to save the students without revealing their identities. Eventually, the situation becomes more complicated with the arrival of Blindstrike, whom the Flex Fighters deduce is someone from the school, and Stretch Monster.
11	11	"Secret Ninja Party"	Alan Caldwell	Eric Rogers	November 17, 2017	111
The Flex Fighters begin to investigate Blindstrike's identity and the possible location of Dr. C. They discover all the villains they've faced under Rook Unlimited and learn from Multi-Farious that they are unwillingly experimented on by Rook. The Flex Fighters track down Stretch Monster who claims to be in the unwilling employ of Dr. C and that he wants to be free of her. While Jake is willing to help their former enemy, Nathan and Ricardo are unsure of the alliance.
12	12	"Endgame"	Kevin Altieri	Tom Krajewski	November 17, 2017	112
In flashback, Stretch Monster drains the brainwaves from a scientist. In the present, Stretch Monster back stabs the Flex Fighters. The team realize that they need to locate the Prolotite to stop him and figure out that Blindstrike's costume is full of Prolotite. After an exhausting battle, they manage to finally defeat and capture him. However, Stretch Monster arrives and kidnaps Blindstrike, forcing the Flex Fighters to chase down their nemesis.
13	13	"The Age of Flexarium"	Frank Paur	Kevin Burke and Chris "Doc" Wyatt	November 17, 2017	113
The Flex Fighters must take down Stretch Monster for good and his Flexarium army. The team also must deal with the fact that Blindstrike is really Riya and that Dr. C has been trying to take down Rook as he is really Stretch Monster. With the Flex Fighters now considered criminals due to Rook's power, they have to decide what their next move is and how to go about with their status besmirched.

=== Special (2018) ===
No. overall	No. in season	Title	Directed by	Written by	Original release date	Prod. code
14	1	"The Breakout"	Victor Cook	Kevin Burke and Chris "Doc" Wyatt	March 13, 2018	201
14	1	"The Breakout"	Victor Cook	Kevin Burke and Chris "Doc" Wyatt	March 13, 2018	202
14	1	"The Breakout"	Victor Cook	Kevin Burke and Chris "Doc" Wyatt	March 13, 2018	203
Branded fugitives by Jonathan Rook, Jake, Nathan and Ricardo become Stretch, Wingspan and Omni-Mass once more when Dr. Don Robertson/ Multi-Farious rampages the city. The trio soon find out that Smokestack, Circuit-Stream, Quick Charge and the Freak Sisters have escaped from Rook Tower as well. After a brief fight with Multi-Farious, Stretch calms him down and they find out some intel about the breakout before he walks off to think about his next move. Meanwhile, Blindstrike (recently revealed to be Riya Dashti, Jake's crush) incapacitates the Flex Fighters with smoke bombs and leaves them in the tunnels before pursuing the Freak Sisters as they attempt to stage a bank robbery. Led by Dr. Racine Cleo/Dr. C, who reveals herself to have tried contacting them earlier, the boys arrive in her lab hidden within the old parts of Charter City underground. Like Multi-Farious, Dr. C deduces Rook staged a breakout to lure the Flex Fighters out of hiding. She volunteers herself and Blindstrike to handle the escapees and offers the Flex Fighters escape by handing over their uniforms. But the trio refuse, claiming that they could recapture the villains on their own. Dr. C agrees to help them, and the trio start their new campaign by apprehending Smokestack at a nightclub in Old Town where he dance-fights Madame Toussant and her gang. After Omni-Mass's plan to push Smokestack's air form around with a fog machine fails, Stretch turns on the a/c in the disco, causing Smokestack to weaken into an unconscious state, while Omni-Mass disguises his voice and sends Rook Security an anonymous call to pick up Smokestack. Dr. C informs them that Quick Charge is attacking the power plant, and the trio heads there with a surprise partner: Multi-Farious. After the fight causes the building to flood with electrified water and breaks out into the streets, the Flex Fighters lure Quick Charge back inside, and Multi-Farious' pieces apprehend her, allowing Wingspan to leave another anonymous call to Rook security before the trio deduce an appointment Quick Charge mentioned she had was with Stretch Monster (Rook's monstrous alter-ego), and the trio agree to help Multi-Farious find Rook. After a brief skirmish with Kane and Delta Squad at Rook Tower, the group finds out Rook is hiding at the warehouse where the Flex Fighters got their powers, and Don was accidentally transformed into Multi-Farious. When he is found, Rook confronts them as Stretch Monster and almost ends up flattened by Multi-Farious before Stretch talks him out of it. The group soon learn that Rook had just finished a cure for Don's mutation, so after Stretch Monster manages to slip away, Don drinks the cure and explodes, turning into a stone statue of his human self before the shell breaks and reveals Don Robertson unharmed. He thanks the Flex Fighters for giving him his life back before they leave to help Blindstrike deal with the Freak Sisters at the bank. After witnessing Blindstrike trap them in an energy cage, Stretch interrogates Kari and Mari Freak after Omni-Mass tries to seduce them and fails. The Freak Sisters reveal that Rook inserted chips into the necks of all the escapees, preventing them from leaving the city with a limited form of mind control (this would later be referenced, as part of the canon parts of the story in "Masters of Order"). After Blindstrike scans the chips on their necks, Dr. C receives the data and begins construction on a control device to round up Circuit-Stream and Quick Charge. Apparently, the latter escaped before Kane could break out of the tower and arrest her. The Flex Fighters soon find Circuit-Stream and prepare to fight him just as Quick Charge shows up in response to the use of Dr. C's controller. While Wingspan deals with Circuit-Stream in a stolen crane truck, Stretch and Omni-Mass distract Quick Charge, using her blasts of electric energy and Omni-Mass' fists to knock down the crane truck and electrocute Circuit-Stream until he falls unconscious. The Flex Fighters then engulf the two in a pyramid-shaped energy field, and retreat with Dr. C and Blindstrike in their camouflaged armored airship just as Kane and his Delta Team arrive on the scene. Impressed with their actions, Dr. C agrees to train them just like she trained Blindstrike, and that the five become allies in their crusade against Rook, much to the excitement of Stretch who proclaims "The Flex Fighters are back!" Meanwhile after watching a live news report, Rook angrily vows to hunt down the Flex Fighters by any means necessary, no matter how long it takes, while his reflection of Stretch Monster shows up in the window as thunder and lightning clash.

=== Season 2 (2018) ===
No. overall	No. in season	Title	Directed by	Written by	Original release date	Prod. code
15	1	"The New Normal"	Alan Caldwell	Jacob Semahn	September 7, 2018	204
The Flex Fighters are considered traitors in Charter City. Now they must work with Blindstrike and Dr. Cleo to battle Rook's cyborg assassin Mechanica (formerly Rook Unlimited Security Officer Santos). They also learn from Dr. C how they really got their powers when Riya was unwittingly a carrier agent of Hyper-Flexarium that infected their class, and that regular Flexarium turned Jake into Stretch, Nathan into Wingspan and Ricardo into Omni-Mass when both formulas interacted.
16	2	"Dreamscape"	Kevin Altieri	Michael Vogel	September 7, 2018	205
A new villain named Dr. Dreamscape gives The Flex Fighters some trouble. In the B-story, Nathan wonders if he should tell his crush, Erika Violette, that he is Wingspan. However, things get worse when Dreamscape takes control over him, and the aftermath leads him to telling Erika, only to have her run away from him.
17	3	"Riya's Revenge"	Frank Paur	Jennifer Muro	September 7, 2018	206
While Riya's exploring some childhood memories and finds data regarding her parents' past as Rook Unlimited Scientists, Rook sends a mystery man nicknamed "The Gentlemen" after her. Meanwhile, Erika secretly follows the Flex Fighters and learns the truth about them, becoming their newest ally in the process.
18	4	"Rise of the Tech Men"	Alan Caldwell	Zac Atkinson	September 7, 2018	207
Stretch is stuck fighting an army of Tech Men without any of his partners to help. In the B-Story, Agent Reynolds becomes suspicious about Rook's operations after discovering his growing obsession with capturing the Flex Fighters.
19	5	"Biomass"	Kevin Altieri	Kevin Burke and Chris "Doc" Wyatt	September 7, 2018	208
A mysterious new enemy named Biomass is stealing experimental plant food from science labs around the city. Meanwhile, Mr. Savic's past finally comes to light when Nathan's grandfather helps the Flex Fighters investigate Biomass and the robberies, soon learning that Biomass and Dr. Savic are the same entity, being manipulated by an even crazier villain named Anastasia.
20	6	"Split Personalities"	Frank Paur	Adam Jay Epstein	September 7, 2018	209
While trying to steal some data from Rook, The Flex Fighters have to deal with a new problem... an accident in Mark Armstrong's lab turns Gabe into the new Multi-Farious! Also, Erika gets hit with some weird goo and develops glowing purple eyes.
21	7	"The Fall of Jonathan Rook"	Alan Caldwell	Paul Tobin	September 7, 2018	210
When the team gets separated, the Tech Men launch their plan to take over Rook Unlimited. In the B-story, a dark secret regarding the Tech Men and Malcolm Kane comes to light.
22	8	"Rook's Story"	Kevin Altieri	Brandon Violette	September 7, 2018	211
While Malcolm Kane, revealed to be the Tech Men's leader "Number One", takes over Rook Tower, Jonathan Rook tells the Flex Fighters and the audience the story of how he became the man he is today including his company, his encounters with the Tech-Men's predecessors, the Epsilon Society, his transformation into Stretch Monster, and the deaths of Riya's parents and the other scientists minus himself and Dr. C.
23	9	"Masters of Order"	Frank Paur	Brian Hohlfeld	September 7, 2018	212
Kane and the Tech Men gradually take over the city with mind control chips, using the same tech as the chips Rook used on the inmates in "Stretch Armstrong: the Breakout" and its canon TV episode counterpart. Meanwhile, the Flex Fighters are forced to forge an alliance with Rook/Stretch Monster as well as Brick and Mortar.
24	10	"Doomsday Clock"	Alan Caldwell	Kevin Burke and Chris "Doc" Wyatt	September 7, 2018	213
Picking up where the last episode left off, Kane and the Tech-Men succeed in enslaving the minds of everyone in Charter City, except for Stretch and Agent Reynolds who both came into contact with a Flexarium-based formula making them immune. After freeing Rook, Dr. C, and the other Flex Fighters from Kane's mind control, our heroes must awaken a comatose Erika and her budding energy powers and work together to take down the Tech Men.

== Comic book ==
Stretch Armstrong and the Flex Fighters

Publication information
- Publisher: IDW Publishing
- Schedule: Monthly
- Genre: Superhero
- Publication date: April – July 2018
- No. of issues: 3
- Main character(s): Stretch Armstrong and the Flex Fighters

Creative team
- Written by: Kevin Burke and Chris "Doc" Wyatt
- Artist: Nikos Koutsis
- Colorist: Mike Toris

The first issue of Stretch Armstrong and the Flex Fighters was released on February 28, 2018. All three issues serve as one full episode that takes place before the season 1 episode "Lie Sandwich".

== Reception ==
The series was received positively. Emily Ashby of Common Sense Media described the series as a "fan superhero tale" with cartoon violence in each episode, but emphasis on teamwork as a theme. She also called it an "evolving buddy comedy" between the main characters.
