= Think Tank (film) =

2006 film

- Directed by: Brian Petersen
- Written by: Brian Petersen
- Produced by: Sean Covel; Chris "Doc" Wyatt
- Starring: Brian Petersen; James Avery; Tina Majorino
- Cinematography: Michael Fimognari
- Edited by: Yuka Ruell
- Music by: John Swihart
- Distributed by: CF Entertainment
- Release date: June 18, 2006
- Running time: 96 minutes
- Country: United States
- Language: English

Think Tank is a 2006 American comedy film written and directed by Brian Petersen, star of MTV's "Sportblender". The film was produced by Chris Wyatt and Sean Covel (Napoleon Dynamite, Beneath). It was released theatrically by Conservative Films & Entertainment, on DVD by Monarch Home Video, broadcast on US cable by Starz, and available online through Netflix's "Watch Instantly" feature.

== Plot ==
Having already achieved some level of notoriety for their first invention, four ambitious inventors form an exclusive club of MENSA wannabes known as the "Think Tank". The hangout of choice for these big-brained innovators is Jon's Pool Hall, a modest local gaming facility that is likely to be put out of business when the monolithic "Palace of Pool" opens its doors. Perhaps if these brainstorming geniuses can finally perfect the game of "frictionless pool" there may be a glimmer of hope for Jon's Pool Hall after all.
