= Dealing with Destiny =

- Film poster
- Directed by: Colm O'Murchu
- Written by: Paul Condoleon
- Produced by: Paul Condoleon; James Condoleon; Theo Aroney
- Starring: Luke Arnold; Clayton Moss; Roger Sciberras; Steve Maresca; Catherine Farrah; Emma Leonard; Barry Quin; Gillian Cooper
- Cinematography: Brycen Horne
- Edited by: Nick McDougall
- Music by: Jason Fernandez
- Distributed by: Blue Pie
- Release date: 1 September 2011
- Country: Australia
- Language: English

Dealing with Destiny is a 2011 Australian comedy film starring Luke Arnold and is directed by Colm O'Murchu. Dealing with Destiny centers around two friends, Blake and Lloyd, who are brilliant physics students competing for the University Medal on their final day of study. As they and their friends get caught up in a series of last day pranks which backfire, misunderstandings arise amongst them and conflict ensues.

== Cast ==
- Luke Arnold as Blake
- Clayton Moss as Lloyd
- Roger Sciberras as Vinnie
- Steve Maresca as Ricardo
- Catherine Farrah as Zara
- Emma Leonard as Destiny
- Barry Quin as Professor Sorvad
- Gillian Cooper as Angelica

== Reception ==
Catherine Brown of Filmink gave it a mixed review saying "the film's biggest flaw is that it plays out more like the pilot of a sitcom, lacking the substance required to make its relatively short eighty-minute running time seem justified." But in its defense she noted the strength of the movie came from the performances of its leads: "Luke Arnold in a likeable performance" and "The film is also worth a look to scope out Australia's emerging acting talent including Clayton Moss, Steve Maresca and Catherine Jermanus." Louise Keller of Urban Cinefile noted in her review "The characters are likable enough and the Sydney settings are appealing although the film lacks a proper storyline which means it plays on a superficial level. University pranks and attractive girls per se do not necessarily make for a complete and satisfying film."

Simon Foster of SBS Movies gave a negative review, saying it was "a college-campus caper that, given its twee bawdiness and stereotypical characterisations, would’ve been right at home on a video store shelf in the early '80s.." September 1, 2011
