= Four Years Later =

Australian-Indian romance drama

- Genre: Romance drama
- Created by: Mithila Gupta
- Written by: Mithila Gupta; Nicole Reddy; S. Shakthidharan
- Directed by: Mohini Herse; Fadia Abboud
- Starring: Shahana Goswami; Akshay Ajit Singh; Kate Box; Taj Aldeeb; Roy Joseph; Yohan Philip; Luke Arnold
- Composer: Isha Ram Das
- Countries of origin: Australia; India
- Original languages: English; Hindi
- No. of seasons: 1
- No. of episodes: 8

Production
- Executive producer: Mithila Gupta
- Producers: Ian Collie; Stephen Corvini; Rob Gibson
- Running time: 30 minutes
- Production company: Easy Tiger Productions

Original release
- Network: SBS
- Release: 2 October – 23 October 2024

Four Years Later, originally titled Four Years is an eight-part Australian-Indian romance drama, premiering on SBS and SBS on Demand on 2 October 2024. It is created, co-written, and executive produced by Mithila Gupta, and stars Shahana Goswami, Akshay Ajit Singh, Kate Box, and Luke Arnold.

== Synopsis ==
The series follows the love story of two medical residents from Jaipur, India, whose families plan an arranged marriage for them. The man, a doctor working towards a specialist training, is almost immediately offered an anaesthesiology traineeship in Australia, while the woman (Sridevi) stays in India, resulting in the couple being separated for four years.

== Production ==
The series is created, co-written, and executive produced by Mithila Gupta, who has also written on The Heights, Bump, Doctor Doctor, Neighbours, and many other successful TV series. She moved with her family from Jaipur to Australia when she was four, so understands much about the migrant experience.

Writing consultants included Nicole Reddy, of Fijian heritage, and Tamil Sri Lankan writer S. Shakthidharan, creator of the hit stage show Counting and Cracking. Ian Collie, Stephen Corvini, and Rob Gibson are the producers of the series, while Fadia Abboud and Mohini Herse direct the series.

Filming of the eight-part romance drama series from Easy Tiger Productions began in the Indian cities of Mumbai and Jaipur in January 2024, before moving to Sydney in February. It was originally titled Four Years.

The series uses both Hindi and English.

== Cast ==
The cast was announced on 4 September 2024:

- Shahana Goswami as Sridevi
- Akshay Ajit Singh as Yash
- Kate Box as Gabs
- Taj Aldeeb as Jamal
- Roy Joseph as Arun
- Luke Arnold as Matt
- Yohan Philip as Rohit
- Philip Quast as Dr Sandy Green

== Broadcast ==
The series premiered with double episodes on SBS on 2 October 2024, with all episodes streaming on SBS on Demand from that date and screening double episodes each Wednesday for four weeks. The series has been subtitled in seven languages: Arabic, Simplified Chinese, Traditional Chinese, Korean, Vietnamese, Hindi, and Punjabi, and all episodes are also available with audio description.

In India, this show was also streamed on Lionsgate Play on 11 July 2025 available in Hindi and English languages.

== Reception ==
The first two episodes of the show garnered 115,000 viewers.

The Sunday Age stated: "The relatively soft launch of this debut by Five Bedrooms screenwriter Mithila Gupta in this timeslot makes little sense".

Sukhmani Khorana, a scholar of migrants' screen media and associate professor at UNSW Sydney, called it "not just an Indian-Australian love story... [but also] a closeted feminist coming-of-age tale", that would appeal to a diverse TV audience.

The Nightly called it "a great series that tells a specific but universal Australian story".

ScreenHub Australia gave it 4 out of 5 stars, calling it "compulsive viewing", "sharply observed and full of telling details when it comes to love", and "a well-written and eminently watchable modern love story".

== Episodes ==
No.	Title	Directed By	Written By	SBS on Demand air date	Television air date	Viewers
1	Episode 1	Mohini Herse	Mithila Gupta	2 October 2024	2 October 2024	115,000
2	Episode 2	Mohini Herse	Mithila Gupta	2 October 2024	2 October 2024	115,000
3	Episode 3	Fadia Abboud	Mithila Gupta	2 October 2024	9 October 2024	69,000
4	Episode 4	Mohini Herse	Mithila Gupta	2 October 2024	9 October 2024	69,000
5	Episode 5	Fadia Abboud	Mithila Gupta	2 October 2024	16 October 2024	59,000
6	Episode 6	Fadia Abboud	Mithila Gupta	2 October 2024	16 October 2024	59,000
7	Episode 7	Fadia Abboud	Mithila Gupta	2 October 2024	23 October 2024	62,000
8	Episode 8	Mohini Herse	Mithila Gupta	2 October 2024	23 October 2024	62,000

== Accolades ==
AACTA Awards
Year	Category	Nominee	Result	Ref
2025	Best Miniseries	Four Years Later - Easy Tiger Productions	Nominated	
