= Rescue: Special Ops =

Australian television drama series

- Genre: Drama; Medical drama Police drama
- Written by: Sarah Smith; Dave Warner; Michaeley O'Brien; Chris Hawkshaw; John Ridley; Liz Doran
- Directed by: Peter Andrikidis; Geoff Bennett; Ian Barry; Garth Maxwell
- Starring: Les Hill; Libby Tanner; Peter Phelps; Daniel Amalm; Gigi Edgley; Andrew Lees; Katherine Hicks
- Opening theme: "Get a Little Dirty" by The Ironweed Project
- Ending theme: "Get a Little Dirty" by The Ironweed Project
- Country of origin: Australia
- Original language: English
- No. of seasons: 3
- No. of episodes: 48

Production
- Producers: Julie McGauran; Sarah Smith
- Production location: New South Wales
- Running time: 42 minutes (without commercials)
- Production company: Southern Star Entertainment

Original release
- Network: Nine Network
- Release: 2 August 2009 – 5 September 2011

Rescue: Special Ops is an Australian television drama series that first screened on the Nine Network in 2009. Filmed in and around Sydney, the program is produced by Southern Star Group with the assistance of Screen Australia and the New South Wales Government.

The series focuses on a team of experienced professional paramedics who specialise in rescue operations. It premiered on Sunday 2 August 2009, and the season finale of the first season aired on Sunday 25 October. A second season screened from 28 June 2010. The third and final season consisting of 22 episodes screened from 30 May 2011. The Nine Network has confirmed it will not be renewing Rescue: Special Ops for a fourth season.

== Synopsis ==
Rescue: Special Ops follows the work of a team of experienced paramedics involved in complex search and rescue operations.

The job brings them face to face with life and death situations every day but just like anyone else, they juggle life, love and career. Brothers Dean Gallagher and Chase Gallagher are competitive alpha males who are part of the Special Ops team.

== Cast ==
Season 1 characters (left to right): Jordan Zwitkowski, Lara Knight, Michelle LeTourneau, Dean Gallagher, Chase Gallagher, Vince Marchello and Heidi Wilson

=== Regular ===
- Libby Tanner as Michelle LeTourneau (Station Manager)
- Peter Phelps as Vince Marchello (Station Coordinator)
- Les Hill as Dean Gallagher (Unit Leader)
- Gigi Edgley as Lara Knight (Unit Officer)
- Daniel Amalm as Jordan Zwitkowski (Unit Officer)
- Katherine Hicks as Heidi Wilson (Unit Officer)
- Andrew Lees as Chase Gallagher (Unit Officer)
- Luke McKenzie as Lachie Gallagher (Unit Officer) (Season 3)

=== Recurring ===
- Annabelle Stephenson as Freya Morley (Season 3, 3 episodes)
- Craig McLachlan as Hayden Bradley (Season 3, 6 episodes)
- Gary Sweet as Shane Gallagher (Season 1, 5 episodes)
- Georgina Haig as Emma Griffiths (Season 2, 3 episodes)
- Jessica Napier as Nicole (Season 1, 4 episodes)
- Luke Pegler as Gary 'Bingo' Bing (Season 2, 4 episodes)
- Madeleine West as Annika Ehrenberg (Season 2, 4 episodes)
- Martin Dingle-Wall as Jake Hudson (Season 1, 4 episodes)
- Myles Pollard as Steve 'Mack' McIntyre (Season 2, 4 episodes)
- Petra Yared as Zoe Hulme (Season 3, 5 episodes)
- Peter Overton as News Reporter (Seasons 1–3, 6 episodes)
- Simmone Jade Mackinnon as Fiona Charlton (Season 1, 5 episodes)
- Tim McCunn as Det. Ian Johnson (Seasons 1–3, 19 episodes)
- Todd Lasance as Cam (Season 3, 8 episodes)
- Vanessa Gray as Renae Daltry (Season 2, 4 episodes)
- Wil Traval as Hamish McIntyre (Seasons 1–3, 9 episodes)

=== Guests ===
Actor	Role	Eps
Abe Forsythe	Brandon	1
Adam Demos	Gilligan	2
Alex Dimitriades	Guy Hewitt	1
Alin Sumarwata	Brooke Henley	1
Alison Langdon	Reporter	1
Alyssa McClelland	Beth Robson	1
Amy Mathews	Claire Newell	2
Anita Hegh	Melissa Gardner	1
Anna McGahan	Tegan Reid	1
Anthony Hayes	Zac Weston	1
Ashleigh Cummings	Britney	1
Brian Rooney	Jim Jones	1
Bridie Carter	Stephanie Rouse	1
Caroline Craig	Sheree O'Brien	1
Christian Clark	Best Man (Jason)	1
Clayton D. Moss	Motorcyclist	1
Damian de Montemas	Jim Tucker	1
Damian Walshe-Howling	Nick	1
Dan Ewing	Jack Gardener	1
Daniel Henshall	Trevor Slezack	1
Danny Adcock	Graham Starkey	1
Danny Roberts	Graham Cooper	1
David Field	Sidney 'Siddy' Carter	1
David Harris	Journalist #2	1
David Roberts	Ed Frazer	2
Dieter Brummer	Nathan Pearl	1
Dorian Nkono	Bennet 'Bones' Bonham	1
Eamon Farren	Arrow	1
Emma Lung	Chelsea Clarke	1
Felicity Price	Wendy Schmidt	1
Gabrielle Scollay	Kate Marchello	1
Geraldine Hakewill	Shona Lankford	1
Grant Dodwell	Lance Foster	1
Gyton Grantley	Willo	1
Hanna Mangan-Lawrence	Tamsyn Taylor	1
Helen Dallimore	Yvette Turner	1
Isabelle Cornish	Lily Regan	1
James Mackay	Saxon Blake	1
Jeremy Lindsay Taylor	Flynn	1
Jessica Tovey	Caitlin Kelly	1
John McNeill	Bill	1
Jonny Pasvolsky	Attacker / Karl Stevenson	1
Josef Ber	Blake Owens	1
Kieran Darcy-Smith	Detective Brendan Lockyer	1
Krew Boylan	Greta	1
Kyly Clarke	Pearl Francis	1
Laura Brent	Katrina Whitney	1
Lincoln Lewis	Sam Marchello	1
Lisa Chappell	Vivian Walker	1
Luke Arnold	Rick Jones	2
Luke McKenzie	Gary	1
Mandy Bishop	Anna Jacoby	1
Marta Dusseldorp	Lisa Hartigan	1
Martin Sacks	Charles Howard	1
Matt Levett	Luke Mortley	1
Michael Dorman	Will Pike	1
Mouche Phillips	Leonie Carr	1
Paul Tassone	Glen Collins	1
Raelee Hill	Helen Hillerstrom	1
Rhonda Doyle	Madam	1
Ria Vandervis	Jasmin	1
Richard Huggett	Steve	1
Roxane Wilson	Chantelle Gregory	2
Sacha Horler	Amanda Jackson	1
Salvatore Coco	Matty Conti	1
Sarah Aubrey	Marnie 'Silva' Silva	1
Saskia Burmeister	Annie Griffin	1
Scott Johnson	Brad Golen	1
Shareena Clanton	Prisoner #1	1
Simon Burke	Warren Thompson	1
Stephen Hunter	Kendrick 'Kenny' Whaley	1
Zac Drayson	Leroy	1

== Reception ==
Season	Episodes	Series Timeslot	Series Premiere	Series Final	Peak Audience	Average Audience	Average Nightly Rank	Average Weekly Rank
2009	13	Sunday 8:30pm	2 August	25 October	1,227,000	1,005,000	#10	#40
2010	13	Monday 8:30pm	28 June	20 September	1,148,000	966,846	#13	#42
2011	22	Monday 8:30pm	30 May	5 September	919,000	772,545	#15	#50

=== Season one ===
#	Title	Original airdate	Timeslot	Viewers (millions)	Nightly rank	Weekly rank
1	"Blue Mountains"	2 August 2009	Sunday 8:30 pm–9:30 pm	1.142	8	25
2	"Thrillseekers"	9 August 2009	Sunday 8:30 pm–9:30 pm	1.155	7	32
3	"Fire in the Cross"	16 August 2009	Sunday 8:30 pm–9:30 pm	1.227	7	24
4	"Deathbed Confessional"	23 August 2009	Sunday 8:30 pm–9:30 pm	0.877	12	56
5	"Ferry Disaster"	30 August 2009	Sunday 8:30 pm–9:30 pm	0.916	12	51
6	"Building Site Conspiracy"	6 September 2009	Sunday 8:30 pm–9:30 pm	0.915	10	50
7	"Luna Park"	13 September 2009	Sunday 8:30 pm–9:30 pm	0.998	11	43
8	"ATM Bandits"	20 September 2009	Sunday 8:30 pm–9:30 pm	0.903	12	57
9	"Rave"	27 September 2009	Sunday 8:30 pm–9:30 pm	0.942	12	45
10	"Eco-warriors"	4 October 2009	Sunday 8:30 pm–9:30 pm	0.879	10	
11	"Bride in the Balloon"	11 October 2009	Sunday 8:30 pm–9:30 pm	1.027	11	43
12	"Episode Twelve"	18 October 2009	Sunday 8:30 pm–9:30 pm	1.021	11	40
13	"Episode Thirteen"	25 October 2009	Sunday 8:30 pm–9:30 pm	1.058	7	36
Series average				1.005	10	40

=== Season two ===
#	Title	Original airdate	Timeslot	Viewers (millions)	Nightly rank	Weekly rank
1	"Enemy Mine"	28 June 2010	Monday 8:30 pm–9:30 pm	0.968	13	41
2	"A Day in the Death of Dean Gallagher"	5 July 2010	Monday 8:30 pm–9:30 pm	1.085	8	27
3	"Locked In"	12 July 2010	Monday 8:30 pm–9:30 pm	1.148	7	21
4	"Jordan's Choice"	19 July 2010	Monday 8:30 pm–9:30 pm	0.910	18	40
5	"Shock Jock"	26 July 2010	Monday 8:30 pm–9:30 pm	1.017	14	43
6	"Thicker than Water"	2 August 2010	Monday 8:30 pm–9:30 pm	0.988	13	41
7	"Find My Baby"	9 August 2010	Monday 8:30 pm–9:30 pm	1.057	8	32
8	"Street Legal"	16 August 2010	Monday 8:30 pm–9:30 pm	0.977	11	41
9	"Out of the Ashes"	23 August 2010	Monday 8:30 pm–9:30 pm	0.942	18	52
10	"Rock Stars"	30 August 2010	Monday 8:30 pm–9:30 pm	0.833	19	63
11	"Off The Rails"	6 September 2010	Monday 8:30 pm–9:30 pm	0.848	17	52
12	"One for the Money"	13 September 2010	Monday 8:30 pm–9:30 pm	0.850	16	56
13	"Crazy Love"	20 September 2010 (Note: Due to the broadcast of the 2010 Brownlow Medal on Network Ten, the season finale did not air in Melbourne, Adelaide or Perth on 20 September 2010. Instead, it was broadcast the following week on 27 September 2010 in those cities.)	Monday 8:30 pm–9:30 pm	0.946		
Series average				0.967	13	42

=== Season three ===
#	Title	Original airdate	Timeslot	Viewers (millions)	Nightly rank	Weekly rank
1	"Ambushed"	30 May 2011	Monday 8:30 pm–9:30 pm	0.805	17	47
2	"Fearless"	30 May 2011	Monday 9:30 pm–10:30 pm	0.667	17	65
3	"True Romance"	6 June 2011	Monday 8:30 pm–9:30 pm	0.744	15	52
4	"Secrets and Lies"	6 June 2011	Monday 9:30 pm–10:30 pm	0.726	17	54
5	"Him or Me"	13 June 2011	Monday 8:30 pm–9:30 pm	0.673	21	61
6	"Demon Days"	13 June 2011	Monday 9:30 pm–10:30 pm	0.598	26	82
7	"Man in the Machine"	20 June 2011	Monday 8:30 pm–9:30 pm	0.680	19	60
8	"The Game"	20 June 2011	Monday 9:30 pm–10:30 pm	0.666	20	64
9	"It's Not The Fall That Kills You"	27 June 2011	Monday 8:30 pm–9:30 pm	0.835	13	40
10	"Stolen"	4 July 2011	Monday 8:30 pm–9:30 pm	0.891	12	38
11	"In Deep"	4 July 2011	Monday 9:30 pm–10:30 pm	0.830	14	45
12	"Break Out"	11 July 2011	Monday 8:30 pm–9:30 pm	0.876	13	36
13	"The Dunes"	18 July 2011	Monday 8:30 pm–9:30 pm	0.919	10	35
14	"Chemical Brothers"	25 July 2011	Monday 8:30 pm–9:30 pm	0.817	15	51
15	"The Carter Redemption"	25 July 2011	Monday 9:30 pm–10:30 pm	0.789	16	53
16	"Storm Chaser"	1 August 2011	Monday 8:30 pm–9:30 pm	0.800	13	45
17	"Art Attack"	8 August 2011	Monday 8:30 pm–9:30 pm	0.755	12	54
18	"Missing Pieces"	15 August 2011	Monday 8:30 pm–9:30 pm	0.864	11	39
19	"Class of Their Own"	22 August 2011	Monday 8:30 pm–9:30 pm	0.820	10	39
20	"The Intervention"	29 August 2011	Monday 8:30 pm–9:30 pm	0.729	15	47
21	"Bad Company"	29 August 2011	Monday 9:30 pm–10:30 pm	0.681	15	54
22	"Two Fires"	5 September 2011	Monday 8:30 pm–9:30 pm	0.831	11	37
Series average				0.773	15	50

- Note: Nightly rank for episodes 1 and 2, and 20 and 21 are combined.

== Home media ==
The Universal Studios DVD Releases of Rescue Special Ops are now out of print and no longer available. Via Vision Entertainment/Madman Entertainment will release "Rescue Special Ops: The Complete Collection" on 26 August 2020.

DVD name	Format	Ep #	Discs/Tapes	Region 4 (Australia)	Special features	Distributors
Rescue Special Ops (Season One)	DVD	13	4	29 September 2010	Behind The Scenes	Universal Studios
Rescue Special Ops (Season Two)	DVD	13	4	2 March 2011	None	Universal Studios
Rescue Special Ops (Season Three)	DVD	22	6	8 December 2011	None	Universal Studios
Rescue Special Ops (The Complete Collection)	DVD	48	14	11 April 2012	None	Universal Studios
Rescue Special Ops (The Complete Collection)	DVD	48	14	26 August 2020	Behind The Scenes (Series 01)	Via Vision Entertainment

== See also ==
- List of Australian television series
