= Jessica Amlee =

Canadian TV and film actress (born 1994)

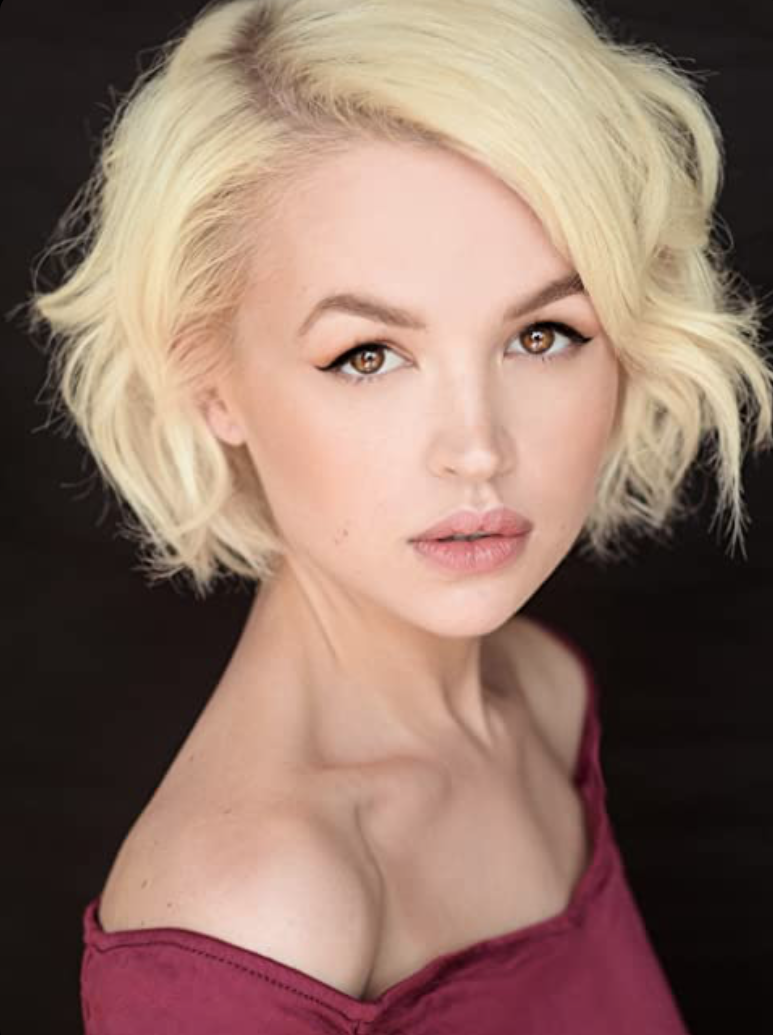
- Amlee in 2020
- Born: Jessica Kelsey Amlee; July 17, 1994 (age 30); Vancouver, British Columbia, Canada
- Occupation: Actress
- Years active: 2001–present

Jessica Kelsey Amlee (born July 17, 1994) is a Canadian television and film actress known for playing Mallory on the television series Heartland. She also appeared as Amy in the thriller-horror film Beneath and Jackie Sanders in Greenhouse Academy on Netflix.

== Filmography ==
=== Film ===
Year	Film	Role	Notes
2002	They	Young Julia	
2003	My Life Without Me	Penny	
2004	Superbabies: Baby Geniuses 2	Little Greta	
2004	Reflection	Sophie Laine	Short film
2004	Chestnut: Hero Of Central Park	Mary	
2005	Eve and the Fire Horse	Sally	
2005	Barbie and the Magic of Pegasus	Blush (Voice)	Animated feature film
2006	The Invisible Dog	Clarketta	Short film
2007	Juliana and the Medicine Fish	Juliana Saunders	Short film
2007	Beneath	Amy	
2021	The Runner	Liz	

=== Television ===
Year	Title	Role	notes
2001	Mysterious Ways	Annie Owen	Episode: "Dead Dog Walking"
2001	The Outer Limits	Young Lorelle	Episode: "Time To Time"
2001	Dark Angel	Brittany	Episode: "Girl Girl"
2001	Smallville	Little Girl	Episode: "Jitters"
2002	Miracle Pets	Marilyn	Episode: "Rocky & Marilyn" (also featured Jessica's real-life brother)
2002	Andromeda	Little Girl	Episode: "Dance of the Mayflies"
2002	Just Cause	Amber Stern	Episodes: "Pilot: Part 1" & "Pilot: Part 2"
2002–2004	Jeremiah	Rose	Episodes: "Things Left Unsaid: Part 1", "Interregnum: Part 1", & "Interregnum: Part 2"
2003	The Twilight Zone	Carrie	Episode: "Placebo Effect"
2003, 2005	Stephen King‘s The Dead Zone	Stade Child/Alex at age 9	Episodes: "The Man Who Never Was" and "Double Vision"
2004	Stargate: Atlantis	Cleo	Episode: "Childhood's End"
2004	The Love Crimes of Gillian Guess	Young Gillian Guess	Television movie
2004	Urban Rush	Herself	Episode: "October 25, 2004"
2006	The Collector	Steffi	Episode: "The Person with Aids"
2006	Absolute Zero	Sophie	Television movie
2006	Firestorm: Last Stand at Yellowstone	Nikki Danville	Television movie
2006	Last Chance Cafe	Kiley Boyer	Television movie
2007–2013, 2017, 2022	Heartland	Mallory Wells	Main role (seasons 1–7); Guest role (seasons 10, 16)
2008	Left Coast	Brittney	Television movie
2009	Living Out Loud	Melissa Marshall	Television movie
2010	A Heartland Christmas	Mallory Wells	Television movie
2015	Kidnapped: The Hannah Anderson Story	Hannah Anderson	Television movie
2016	Connexion Mortelle	Issie	Television movie
2017–2019	Greenhouse Academy	Jackie Sanders	Series regular (seasons 1–2); Guest role (season 3)
