= MPSIB =

1982-83 Australian television series

- Created by: Colin Free
- Written by: Colin Free; Janis Balodis; Ginny Lowndes
- Directed by: Eric Tayler
- Starring: Michael Preston; Peta Toppano; Barry Quin
- Country of origin: Australia
- Original language: English
- No. of seasons: 1
- No. of episodes: 10

Production
- Executive producer: John Croyston
- Running time: 50 minutes

Original release
- Network: ABC
- Release: November 19, 1982 – February 4, 1983

MPSIB is an Australian television series that aired on ABC in 1982-83. It featured Michael Preston, Peta Toppano and Barry Quin as officers in the Missing Persons Special Investigation Bureau (or Branch).

Reception of the opening episode was negative. The Sydney Morning Herald's Susan Orr wrote "A fairly superficial and confused drama but some convincing acting from the leading characters, especially Mike Preston" Jacqueline Lee Lewes of The Sun-Herald wrote "The script is over-plotted and contrived, the dialogue heavy-handed, the action stagey and the acting shallow." Michael Shmith of the Age was also critical but wrote "MPSIB may well mature into a fine series as the weeks go by. It may well be that this first episode has been designed as a familiarisation course, and the characters might be less obviously detailed in future episodes. We shall see ..."

Mike Carlton later wrote in the Sydney Morning Herald "The ABC drama department in Sydney has unwisely produced this little number and even more ill-advisedly actually decided to screen it, after the news on Fridays." In The Sydney Morning Herald it made Denis O'Brien's list of worst three shows for 1982.

== Cast ==
- Michael Preston as Sergeant Noel Braden
- Peta Toppano as Constable Lisa Hesse
- Barry Quin as Senior Constable Gary Malone
- Dennis Miller as Barney Blake
