= Half Magic =

Half Magic may refer to:

- Half Magic, a 1954 novel by Edward Eager
- Half Magic (film), an American film released in February 2018
- Half Magic, the alternate title of the 2020 animated film Onward in Japan
