= Klayton Stainer =

Australian filmmaker (born 1991)

- Born: 1991; Adelaide, South Australia
- Education: Willunga High School
- Alma mater: Swinburne University of Technology; Melbourne, Australia
- Occupation: Filmmaker

Klayton Aaron Stainer (born 28 August 1991) is an Australian Filmmaker. He attended the Swinburne University of Technology in Melbourne. His film company is called KAS Creations Film & Media.

== Awards and nominations ==
=== I Remember the Future ===
- 2015 Byron Bay International Film Festival for Young Australian Filmmaker of the Year - nominated
- 2014 WorldFest Houston - Won the Grand Remi Award for Best Student Film
- 2014 California Film Awards - Won the Grand Award for Best Foreign Short
- 2014 Oregon International Film Awards - Won the Platinum Award for Best Short Film
- 2014 SciFi Film Festival - Won Best Script
- 2014 ATOM Awards for Best Short Fiction Film - nominated
- 2014 ATOM Awards for Best Tertiary Short Fiction - nominated
- 2014 Accolade Competition - Won Award of Merit for Best Short Film

=== 3 Minutes ===
- 2013 WorldFest Houston - Won the Silver Award for Best Science Fiction Film
- 2013 Melbourne Underground Film Festival for Best Short Film - nominated
- 2013 Los Angeles Movie Awards - Honorable Mention

=== Atom ===
- 2012 Melbourne International Animation Festival - Won Best of the Next - Australian Award
- 2012 WorldFest Houston - Won the Platinum Award for Best Science Fiction Film
- 2012 California Film Awards - Won the Gold Award for Best Animated Film
- 2012 Oregon International Film Awards - Won the Grand Remi Award for Best Student Film
- 2012 Maverick Movie Awards for Best Picture - nominated
- 2012 Maverick Movie Awards for Best Director - nominated
- 2012 Maverick Movie Awards for Best Animation - nominated

== Filmography ==
- I Remember the Future (2014)
- 3 Minutes (2013) (Short)
- Atom (2012) (Animation)
- Collectables (2012) (Short)
- Watching the Wheels (2011) (Documentary)
- The Boys Are Back (2009) (Actor)
- Broken Hill (2009) (Actor)
- Hey Hey It's Esther Blueburger (2008) (Actor)
- Alma Mater High (2007) (Actor)
- Dr. Plonk (2007) (Actor)
