= Coyote (2007 film) =

Independent American film

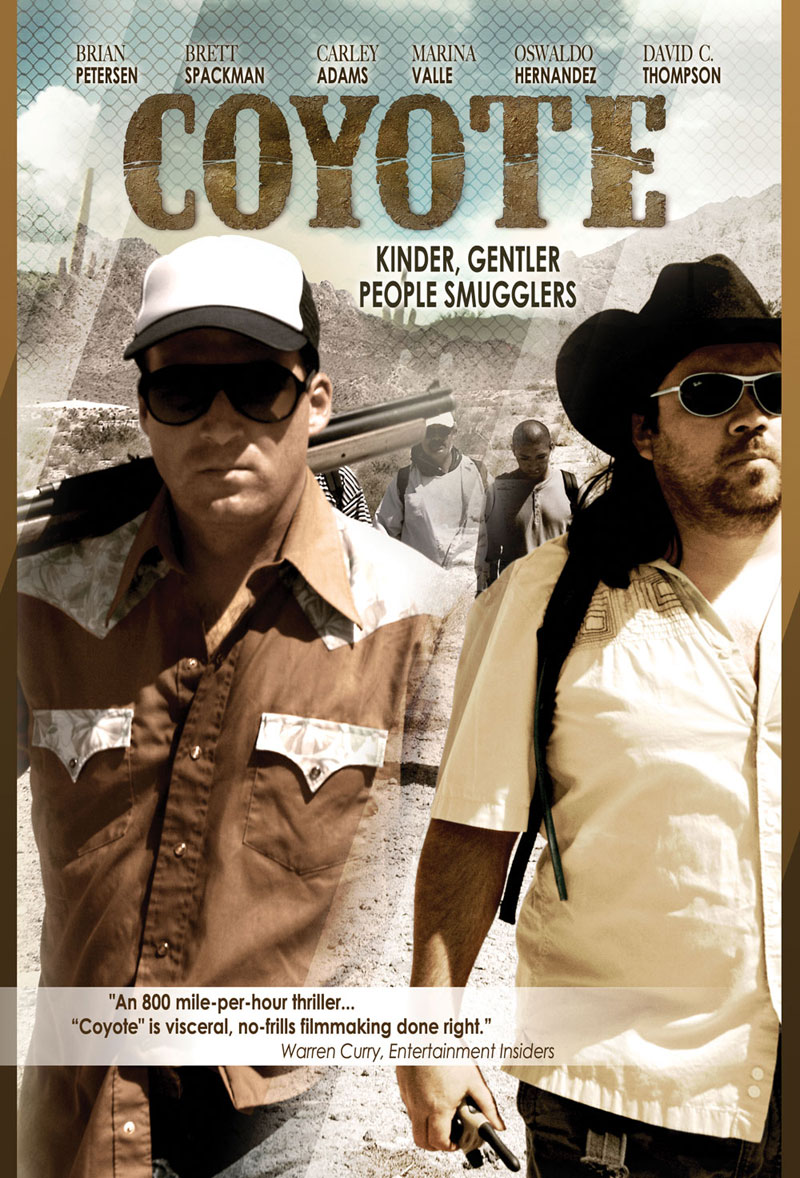
- Theatrical release poster
- Directed by: Brian Petersen
- Written by: Brett Spackman; Brian Petersen
- Produced by: Devin Colvin; Chris Wyatt
- Starring: Brian Petersen; Brett Spackman; Carley Adams; Marina Valle; David C. Thompson; Osvaldo Hernandez
- Cinematography: Robb Hanks
- Edited by: Brett Spackman
- Music by: Chris Brady
- Distributed by: Maya Entertainment
- Release date: September 27, 2007 (San Diego)
- Running time: 95 minutes
- Country: United States
- Language: English

Coyote is a 2007 independent film created by Brian Petersen and Brett Spackman.

After a friend's son is deported to Mexico, the two main characters smuggle him back into the United States. After seeing the desperate plight and unscrupulous people who are generally involved in smuggling people into the United States, the friends decide to apply business principles to the issue. They set up a business venture to smuggle more people in for profit, becoming coyote smugglers. The movie chronicles the events that occur as the business venture begins to unravel.

The film was produced by Devin Colvin and Chris Wyatt and did a successful festival run in 2008, garnering 7 awards including "Best Film" at both the Big Bear Lake International Film Festival and at the TriMedia Film Festival, and "Best Actor" for Petersen (who also plays a lead role) at the San Diego Film Festival.

== Plot ==
Encouraged by the lack of trouble they experienced while transporting a recently deported friend back into the United States from Mexico, longtime pals J and Steve decide to form a company dedicated to a kinder, gentler brand of people smuggling. The border agents in Nogales were positively gullible and the Minutemen were nowhere to be found, leading the two naïve Americans to suspect that they can run a profitable scheme by helping desperate Mexicans gain illegal entry into the United States. It isn't long before the true coyotes discover what's been happening right under their noses, and J and Steve learn the real perils of crossing boundaries.
