= Kidnapping of Hannah Anderson =

American kidnapping case

- Location: Murders: 2071 Ross Avenue, Boulevard, California; Abduction: National City, California to Cascade, Idaho
- Date: August 3–10, 2013
- Attack type: Murder, arson, child abduction
- Weapons: Crowbar; Arson fire; Two guns
- Deaths: 3 (including the perpetrator)
- Victims: Christina Anderson; Ethan Anderson; Hannah Anderson
- Perpetrator: James Lee DiMaggio

On or about the afternoon of August 3, 2013, 16-year-old Hannah Marie Anderson (born July 22, 1997) was abducted after cheerleading practice from Sweetwater High School in National City, California. The suspect was later identified by authorities as 40-year-old Jim Lee DiMaggio, owner of a home in Boulevard, California, about an hour away, where Anderson, her mother Christina and brother Ethan had been overnight guests the previous evening.

The bodies of Christina Anderson, Ethan Anderson and the family dog were later found in DiMaggio's burned home. An Amber alert was issued for Hannah Anderson, who was found alive at a remote impromptu campsite in the Frank Church–River of No Return Wilderness in Idaho on August 10, a week after she was abducted. DiMaggio was killed by FBI agents during a shootout at the campsite.

== Abduction and manhunt ==
=== Boulevard murders ===
On August 3, family friend James DiMaggio had invited Christina Anderson and her children to his home in Boulevard, reportedly to say goodbye because he was planning to move to Texas. He also lied to them about having to leave his house unintentionally in order to get them on his property. The Anderson family, who lived about 45 miles (72 kilometers) away in Lakeside, stayed over at his home. The children's father, Brett Anderson, was on a three-month job in Tennessee at the time.

On August 4, a fire was reported at DiMaggio's house in Boulevard, where firemen found the bodies of Christina Anderson, a child later identified as Ethan Anderson and the family dog. An arrest warrant was issued for DiMaggio.

In late September 2013, the San Diego County Medical Examiner's office released results of the autopsies of Christina and Ethan Anderson. The autopsy of Christina Anderson found that a plastic cable tie had been used to bind her ankles, and that duct tape was wrapped around her neck and mouth. Her right arm and both legs were fractured, and there was a cut on her neck. She had been struck at least twelve times in the head. The autopsy of Ethan Anderson determined that the boy died because of the fire, though he also had skeletal fractures that could have been caused by events during the day of the murders.

=== Abduction reported ===
On August 4, 2013, Anderson's grandparents called the police and reported their grandchildren missing, prompting police to issue a statewide Amber alert, the first alert sent out to cellphones in California. As the child's body found in the burned-out home had not yet been identified, the Amber alert included both Hannah and Ethan Anderson. The manhunt stretched along the Pacific Coast from British Columbia, Canada to Baja California, Mexico.

=== Discovery and rescue ===
On August 7, horseback riders spotted two people matching the description of DiMaggio and Anderson in Cascade, Idaho and notified authorities after seeing a news report about the abduction.

On the same day that the sightings were reported, DiMaggio's car, a blue Nissan Versa, was discovered near the Frank Church–River of No Return Wilderness. The car's license plates had been removed and brush was used to hide the vehicle.

On August 10, police discovered DiMaggio's campsite and an FBI tactical agent killed DiMaggio near Morehead Lake around 5:00 p.m.from inside a plane after DiMaggio fired at least one shot at the officers, which he did having been persuaded by Hannah to shoot in the air in order to catch the attention of rangers on horseback, since he wanted to steal their horses, while he didn't know the FBI had them surrounded and was circling above them. DiMaggio was shot six times in the head, arms, and upper torso. Anderson had no visible injuries, but was taken to a local hospital for crisis counseling. Afterwards, when asked if she was glad James DiMaggio was dead, Hannah Anderson responded, "Absolutely yes".

According to Anderson, James DiMaggio had threatened to kill her and anyone who tried to rescue her.

== Perpetrator ==
James Lee DiMaggio (January 17, 1973 – August 10, 2013), age 40, was a telecommunications technician in San Diego. According to a friend, his father, James Everet Dimaggio, was accused of attempting to kidnap the 16-year-old daughter of an ex-girlfriend at gunpoint in 1988 and committed suicide on August 10, 1995, exactly 18 years to the day before his own son was killed having committed a similar crime.

DiMaggio was described as the best friend of Brett Anderson, and he was like an uncle to the children. He helped with various tasks, such as driving Hannah and a friend from a gymnastics meet, during which he had unnerved her by saying he would like to date her if they were the same age. During a trip to Los Angeles with Anderson, DiMaggio also complained she "wasn't paying enough attention to him." Anderson's friends said she did not like being alone with him and was "creeped out" by his comments on the drive from the meet.

DiMaggio listed Hannah's grandmother Bernice Anderson as the beneficiary to his life insurance in 2011, while he lived with her. A friend of DiMaggio said that he intended the $112,000 for Hannah and Ethan, but did not trust their parents to handle the inheritance. This prompted members of DiMaggio's family to request a paternity test to determine if he fathered the Anderson children. Brett called the suggestion "disgusting" and an Anderson family spokeswoman said DiMaggio had not met Christina until she was six months pregnant with Hannah. The DiMaggio family later withdrew their request for DNA testing.

According to released warrants, DiMaggio received letters from Hannah Anderson which were found in his home by investigators, and exchanged over a dozen calls with her before the murders occurred. However, San Diego County Sheriff Bill Gore said Hannah Anderson was "a victim in every sense of the word" and did not willingly go with DiMaggio. Gore also suggested that authorities may never be able to fully determine the reason for DiMaggio's crime rampage.

== In popular culture ==
- The 2013 Criminal Minds episode "Route 66" was inspired by the Hannah Anderson case.
- In May 2015, the Lifetime TV network aired the made-for-TV movie Kidnapped: The Hannah Anderson Story starring Jessica Amlee as Hannah Anderson, Scott Patterson as James DiMaggio, and Brian McNamara as Brett Anderson. Anderson was disappointed by the Lifetime movie, angrily posting on her Instagram page that she never gave her permission or information for the movie, and that even the preview contained false facts and untrue events.
- The Law and Order SVU episode "Send in the Clowns" was partially inspired by this case, in addition to the 2016 clown sightings.

== See also ==
- List of kidnappings
- Lists of solved missing person cases
