= Tater Tot & Patton =

2017 film directed by Andrew Kightlinger

- Theatrical release poster
- Directed by: Andrew Kightlinger
- Written by: Andrew Kightlinger
- Produced by: Adam Emerson; Ryan M. Hall; Dohui Kim
- Starring: Jessica Rothe; Bates Wilder; Forrest Weber
- Cinematography: Per
- Edited by: Andrew Kightlinger; Ema Ryan Yamazaki
- Music by: Garth Stevenson
- Production company: KandamarK
- Distributed by: Giant Pictures
- Release date: June 9, 2017
- Running time: 91 minutes
- Country: United States
- Language: English

Tater Tot & Patton is a 2017 American drama film written and directed by Andrew Kightlinger. The film stars Jessica Rothe, Bates Wilder, and Forrest Weber.

It was released on June 9, 2017 by Giant Pictures.

== Premise ==
A wayward millennial escapes to a South Dakota ranch, unhinging her Uncle's placid alcoholic life.

== Cast ==
- Jessica Rothe as Andie
- Bates Wilder as Erwin
- Forrest Weber as Richie
- Kathy Askew as Tilly

== Release ==
The film was released on June 9, 2017 by Giant Pictures.

== Reception ==
On review aggregator website Rotten Tomatoes, the film holds an approval rating of 86% based on 21 critic reviews, with an average rating of 6.51/10. James Hanton of Outtake Mag scored the film a 4/5 and stated "A film executed with great conviction and a staggering attention to detail, Tater Tot & Patton strikes the perfect balance between relatable and extraordinary." Movie Nation's Roger Moore rated the film 2.5/4 and said "A vivid sense of place – South Dakota – and a winning, subtle turn by Jessica Rothe are the strong suit of this character dramedy."
