= Broken Hill (film) =

- Film poster
- Directed by: Dagen Merrill
- Written by: Dagen Merrill
- Produced by: Chris Wyatt; Julie Ryan
- Starring: Luke Arnold; Alexa Vega; Timothy Hutton
- Cinematography: Nick Remy Matthews ACS
- Production company: PorchLight Entertainment
- Distributed by: Entertainment One
- Release date: September 11, 2009
- Countries: United States; Australia
- Language: English

Broken Hill is a 2009 American-Australian drama film. It is directed and written by Dagen Merrill, and stars Luke Arnold, Alexa Vega, and, in a supporting role, Timothy Hutton.

== Synopsis ==
Tommy, a gifted teenage composer, dreams of being accepted into the famous Sydney Conservatorium of Music. Unfortunately, a good band is hard to find in the middle of the Australian Outback—until an incident involving flying watermelons leads him to a group of talented prison inmates.

He meets Kat, his love interest, as part of the story.

== Cast ==
- Luke Arnold as Tommy McAlpine
- Alexa Vega as Kat Rogers
- Timothy Hutton as George McAlpine
- Rhys Wakefield as Scott Price
- Andy McPhee as Bear
- The Fishbowl Boys as themselves
- Klayton Stainer as Watermelon Thief
- Luke O'Loughlin as Fuzz
- George Kapiniaris as Ricardo Romero
- Maude Davey as social worker Dinnattee
- Lani Tupu as Maestro Pindari (voice)

== Reception ==
Roger Moore of the Orlando Sentinel found the sight of the lead character conducting an imaginary orchestra a little challenging, and gave the movie 2 stars (out of five).

Cary Darling of the Dallas Morning News objected to the "hardened" prisoners seeming as threatening "as Hogan's Heroes", but gave the film 3½ stars out of five.

Jeff Vice of the Deseret News praises the "gorgeous Australian settings" and the cast of "mostly fresh-faced actors," and sums it up as an "entertaining feel-good tale", before awarding the film 2½ stars out of four.

The movie (though said to be fictional) has parallels to the true life story of the jailhouse band Captive Edition and country singer Ricky Joan. The group was formed in Sydney's Long Bay Jail by the musician and prison volunteer Vincent Ruello. Ruello auditioned the inmates in 1993 then produced and recorded the Hope album from inside the jail auditorium. Captive Edition was contracted under Warner Chappell Music by CEO John Bromel himself soon after hearing the CD. The grand concert finale was filmed by the Network 10 at the Royal Alexandra Hospital for Children in 1994. The Hope album spawned music rehab programmes across all Australian jails when released in 1994 to extensive media coverage.

== Awards ==
Broken Hill took the Best Feature Film - Audience Choice Award at the TriMedia Film Festival held in Fort Collins, Colorado (USA) and won a Best Film award at the Giffoni Film Festival in Italy. The Giffoni Film Festival website describes Broken Hill as "halfway between Sister Act and the Italian movie La musica nel Cuore.

The 2010 International Family Film Festival awarded Broken Hill the Director's Gold Spirit Award, the top jury prize awarded by the Festival.

== Home media ==
The DVD was released in the US on May 17, 2011.

== See also ==
- Cinema of Australia
