= Chris Wyatt (producer) =

American producer (born 1975)

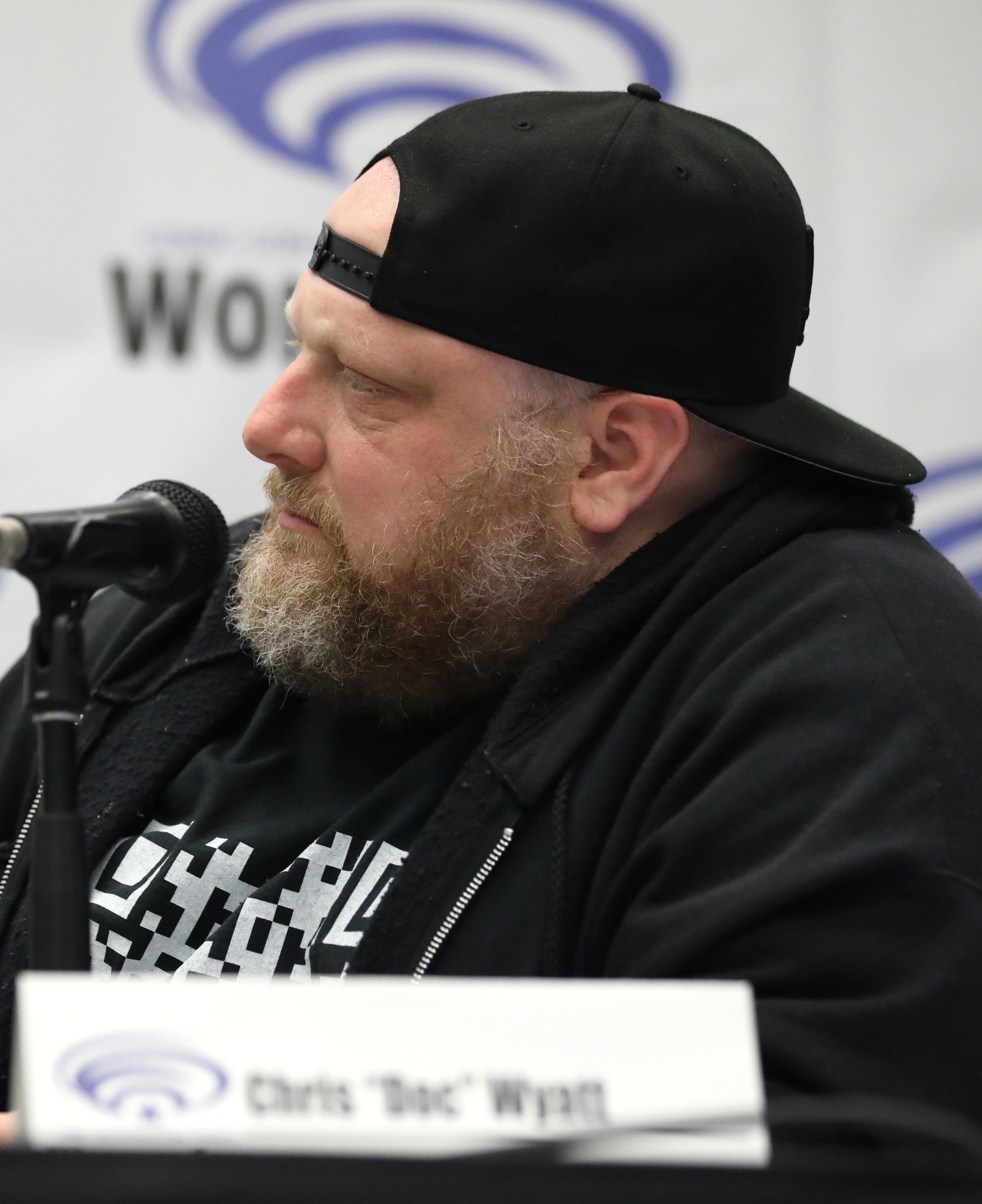
Wyatt at the 2024 WonderCon

Christopher Aaron Wyatt (born 1975), sometimes credited as Chris "Doc" Wyatt, is an American film and TV producer, writer, and second unit director.

== Early life and education ==
Wyatt was born in Atlanta, Georgia and graduated in 1993 from The Walker School in Marietta, Georgia. He went on to become a graduate of the Peter Stark Producing Program at the University of Southern California.

== Career ==
Wyatt served as producer for the 2004 film Napoleon Dynamite, the 2006 film Think Tank, the 2007 film Beneath, the 2007 film Coyote, and the 2009 film Broken Hill featuring Oscar-winner Timothy Hutton. Wyatt next produced Cafe (2010) starring Jennifer Love Hewitt and Murder in the Dark (2013), which he also co-wrote.

Wyatt, together with writing partner Kevin Burke, has written episodes of many animated TV shows, starting with Iron Man: Armored Adventures and Avengers: Earth's Mightiest Heroes. He has also co-written episodes for Avengers Assemble and Ultimate Spider-Man.

Again alongside Kevin Burke, Wyatt was also a regular writer for Teenage Mutant Ninja Turtles, wrote four episodes for My Little Pony: Friendship Is Magic titled "The Times They Are a Changeling", "Viva Las Pegasus", “P.P.O.V. (Pony Point of View)”, and "Friendship University", and teamed up with Burke on Stretch Armstrong and the Flex Fighters for Netflix as developers (alongside Victor Cook), executive producers, writers and story editors. The duo also held the same roles on the Spin Master Entertainment adaptation of Super Dinosaur. Wyatt and Burke were executive producers and head writers on Transformers: Rescue Bots Academy and Transformers: BotBots.

== Awards and nominations ==
In 2005, Wyatt took home an MTV Movie Award when Napoleon Dynamite won Best Movie.

Also in 2005, was nominated for an Independent Spirit Award and shared the nomination for Best First Feature with Jared Hess (director), Jeremy Coon (producer), and Sean Covel (producer). Napoleon Dynamite lost to Garden State (2004). Additionally that year, Wyatt was nominated with Sean Covel for the Producers Award at the Independent Spirit Awards.

In 2017, Wyatt and his writing partner Kevin Burke were Emmy nominated for "Outstanding Short Form Animated Program" for the episode "Space Walk" of Rocket & Groot.

== Screenwriting credits ==
- Series head writer denoted in bold.

=== Television ===
- Iron Man: Armored Adventures (2009–2012)
- The Avengers: Earth's Mightiest Heroes (2010–2012)
- Gormiti Nature Unleashed (2012)
- Avengers Assemble (2013–2015)
- Teenage Mutant Ninja Turtles (2013–2017)
- Monsuno (2014)
- Transformers: Rescue Bots (2014–2016)
- The Octonauts (2015–2016)
- Ben 10 (2016)
- Ultimate Spider-Man (2016–2017)
- My Little Pony: Friendship Is Magic (2016–2018)
- Mystic Cosmic Patrol (2017)
- Guardians of the Galaxy (2017)
- Sonic Boom (2017)
- **Rocket & Groot** (2017)
- **Stretch Armstrong and the Flex Fighters** (2017–2018)
- Spider-Man (2017–2020)
- Bravest Warriors (2018)
- Transformers: Cyberverse (2018)
- Star Wars Resistance (2018–2019)
- **Super Dinosaur** (2018–2019)
- Legend Quest: Masters of Myth (2019)
- Sunny Day (2019)
- Ninjago (2019–2022)
- Thunderbirds Are Go (2020)
- Chico Bon Bon: Monkey with a Tool Belt (2020)
- **Snap Ships: Dawn of Battle** (2020)
- **Transformers: Rescue Bots Academy** (2020–2021)
- Octonauts: Above & Beyond (2022)
- **Transformers: BotBots** (2022)
- **Ninjago: Dragons Rising** (2023–present)
- Hot Wheels Let's Race (2024)
- Tales of the Teenage Mutant Ninja Turtles (2025)
- Stranger Things: Tales from '85 (2026)

=== Film ===
- Concrete Blondes (2013)
- Murder in the Dark (2013)
- Batman Unlimited: Mechs vs. Mutants (2016)

=== Web shorts ===
- Batman Unlimited (2016)
- CryptoForce Alpha (2017)
- Ninjago: Reimagined (2021)
- The Virtues of Spinjitzu (2022)

== Producer ==
=== Television ===
- Napoleon Dynamite (2012)
- Avengers Assemble (2014–2015)
- Ultimate Spider-Man (2016–2017)
- Mystic Cosmic Patrol (2017)
- Stretch Armstrong and the Flex Fighters (2017–2018)
- Spider-Man (2017–2020)
- Super Dinosaur (2018–2019)
- Transformers: Rescue Bots Academy (2019–2021)
- Ninjago (2020–2022)
- Transformers: BotBots (2022)
- Ninjago: Dragons Rising (2023–present)

=== Film ===
- Napoleon Dynamite (2004)
- Think Tank (2006)
- Beneath (2007)
- Coyote (2007)
- Broken Hill (2009)
- Café (2010)
- The Citizen (2013)
- Murder in the Dark (2013)
- Eleven Eleven (2018)
