= Beneath (2007 film) =

- Directed by: Dagen Merrill
- Written by: Kevin Burke; Dagen Merrill
- Produced by: Sean Covel; Troy Craig Poon; Chris "Doc" Wyatt
- Starring: Nora Zehetner; Matthew Settle; Carly Pope; Gabrielle Rose; Jessica Amlee; Warren Christie; Brenna O'Brien; Patrick Gilmore; Don S. Davis; Tom McBeath
- Cinematography: Mike Southon
- Edited by: Jeff Gullo
- Music by: John Frizzell; Frederik Wiedmann
- Production companies: MTV Films; Sean Covel/Chris Wyatt Productions
- Distributed by: Paramount Home Entertainment (Note: Distributed under the Paramount Classics label.)
- Release date: August 7, 2007
- Country: United States
- Language: English

Beneath is a straight-to-DVD horror thriller film co-produced in a first time partnership between Paramount Classics (a Viacom subsidiary) and MTV Films. The film is directed by the newcomer Dagen Merrill, who co-wrote the script with Kevin Burke, and the list of producers include Sean Covel and Chris Wyatt, as well as Troy Craig Poon. In Paramount Classics's first horror movie, which marks the company's expansion from acquisitions into the production arena, the cast includes Nora Zehetner and Matthew Settle. Shooting started 2005 in Vancouver, the film was released on DVD on August 7, 2007. It was the first direct-to-video title produced by MTV Films.

== Plot ==
On the way home from visiting her parents' grave, Christy crashes her car into a rock. The impact throws Christy to safety, but her older sister, Vanessa, is trapped inside when the car explodes. Vanessa initially survives, though disfigured and completely burnt. Christy is sent to Pine Bluff Psychiatric Care Center for treatment while her sister is treated by her husband Dr. John Locke, at home with the assistance of the nurse Claire Wells (Eliza Norbury), and his rather stern mother, Mrs Locke. When Vanessa has a heart attack and dies, Christy has a breakdown at the funeral service screaming that her sister is alive in the coffin. Christy moves to California for pre-med, but remains haunted by nightmares and weird visions. Six years later, Christy returns to Edgemont for a funeral. Vanessa's husband and mother-in-law regard her coldly, but Amy, Christy's niece who is afraid of "dark things" behind the walls of the house, asks her to stay.

Christy experiences blackouts and strange visions, the most prominent of which features a scarred, burnt woman clawing at a lid. She decides to investigate the death of her sister that she believes had been buried alive. The locals believe she has borderline personality disorder. Christy befriends a cop, Jeff, and discovers that her sister was treated in the house's basement, which had tunnels connecting it to the rest of the house. She also visits the father of Claire Wells, the nurse who treated her sister, who tells her the Lockes are evil and ruined Claire's life, and that Claire broke relations with her family and left the state after Vanessa died. Meanwhile, Christy's premonition that Mrs. Locke will die comes true.

Amy tells Christy about a monster which comes into her room through the wardrobe while she is sleeping and touches her cheek. While in Amy's bedroom, Christy hears noises from the wardrobe. She travels through a tunnel connecting the wardrobe and the basement and has another blackout and when she wakes, she discovers John next to her with scratches on his cheek. He threatens to press charges if she does not leave the house immediately. In the Lockes' boathouse, Christy finds a love letter from John to Claire revealing an affair between them and suggesting that Vanessa's death would be best for everyone. Christy is convinced that John and Claire gave Vanessa medication to induce her heart attack.

Christy shares her findings with Jeff. They visit the hospital staff connected to Vanessa's treatment, and a doctor tells them that Vanessa's treatment had been controlled entirely by John and Claire. He also says Vanessa's murder would be impossible to prove because her body would have decomposed completely by now, making an autopsy impossible. However, Christy points out that the coffin's lid would contain Vanessa's scratch marks, proving she was alive at the time of her burial. No one, including Jeff, believes Christy. Nonetheless, Christy opens Vanessa's coffin herself and is shocked to see it unscathed.

Christy returns to the house and apologizes to John. She is about to leave when she gets a phone call from Jeff and realizes that the woman buried was not her sister but Claire Wells. John attacks Christy but she shoots him with his gun. Christy searches the house again and discovers an underground cellar wherein lies a badly burnt and disfigured woman—Vanessa. Vanessa does not recognize Christy and attacks her until she sees the necklace Christy is wearing—a present from Vanessa. Vanessa cannot speak, but Christy assures her and promises to take care of her. Christy realizes that her visions were of Vanessa scratching the cellar trap. Vanessa had traveled through the house's tunnels, discovered the affair, and killed Claire. She had also killed Mrs Locke and would visit her daughter through the wardrobe.

Vanessa and Christy share a moment, when Amy suddenly appears. Amy stabs Vanessa, unaware she is her mother, in order to kill "the monster". In the last scene, Christy scatters Vanessa's ashes into a lake. Amy takes a picture and there is a vision of Vanessa prior to her accident, staring at her killer.

== Cast ==
- Nora Zehetner as Christy Wescot
- Matthew Settle as John Locke
- Warren Christie as Jeff Burdan
- Jessica Amlee as Amy Locke
- Carly Pope as Vanessa Locke
- Don S. Davis as Joseph Locke
- Gabrielle Rose as Mrs. Locke
- Eliza Norbury as Claire Wells
- Nicola Anderson as Debbie Houston
- Patrick Gilmore as Randy Watt

== Reception ==
Reception to the movie has been negative, with Fearnet's Scott Weinberg saying "while it's by no means awful, the movie's as effortlessly forgettable as its title." Reelfilm's David Nusair stated that "Though it kicks off with a relatively promising prologue, Beneath's few positive elements are ultimately rendered moot by an almost impossibly slow-moving narrative that's exacerbated by Nora Zehetner's woefully flat turn as the central character."
