= Two's Company (Australian TV series) =

TV variety

- Genre: Variety
- Country of origin: Australia
- Original language: English

Production
- Running time: 30 minutes

Original release
- Network: ABV-2
- Release: 1959 – 2 January 1961

Two's Company was an Australian television variety series which aired in three different versions on Melbourne station ABV-2.

The first version aired in 1959 for a series of seven episodes, with the regulars being Max Bostick's Sextet, Frankie Davidson and Heather Horwood. Guests who appeared during the run of the series included Davidson's three-year-old son, vocalist Jackie Bowkett, Frank Rich, vocalist Bill French, hammond organist Ian Thomas, piano accordionist Sergio Fochi, and vocalist Graeme Bent.

The second version aired in 1960 for a series of six episodes, and starred vocalists Judy Banks and Rod McLennan as well as the Ted Preston Quintet. Guests who appearing during the run of this version included Terry Stanhope, June Carey, Jan Fraser, John Rohan, Hazel McInerney, Gavin Paul, Paula Langlands, Keith Petersen, Gaynor Bunning, Ron Cadee, Margaret Becker, and Robert Peach.

The third version aired in late 1960 and ended 2 January 1961 for a series of six episodes. This version starred John and Shirley Broadway as well as vocal group The Tri-Tones and the Ted Preston Quintet. Guests who appeared during the run of this version included Gavin Paul, John Dooland, Terry Stanhope, and Frankie Davidson.

== Episode status ==
It is not known how many episodes still exist, given the erratic survival rate of early Australian television. Two episodes, from 19 December 1960 and 2 January 1961, are held by the National Film and Sound Archive.
