= Luke Arnold =

Australian actor and author

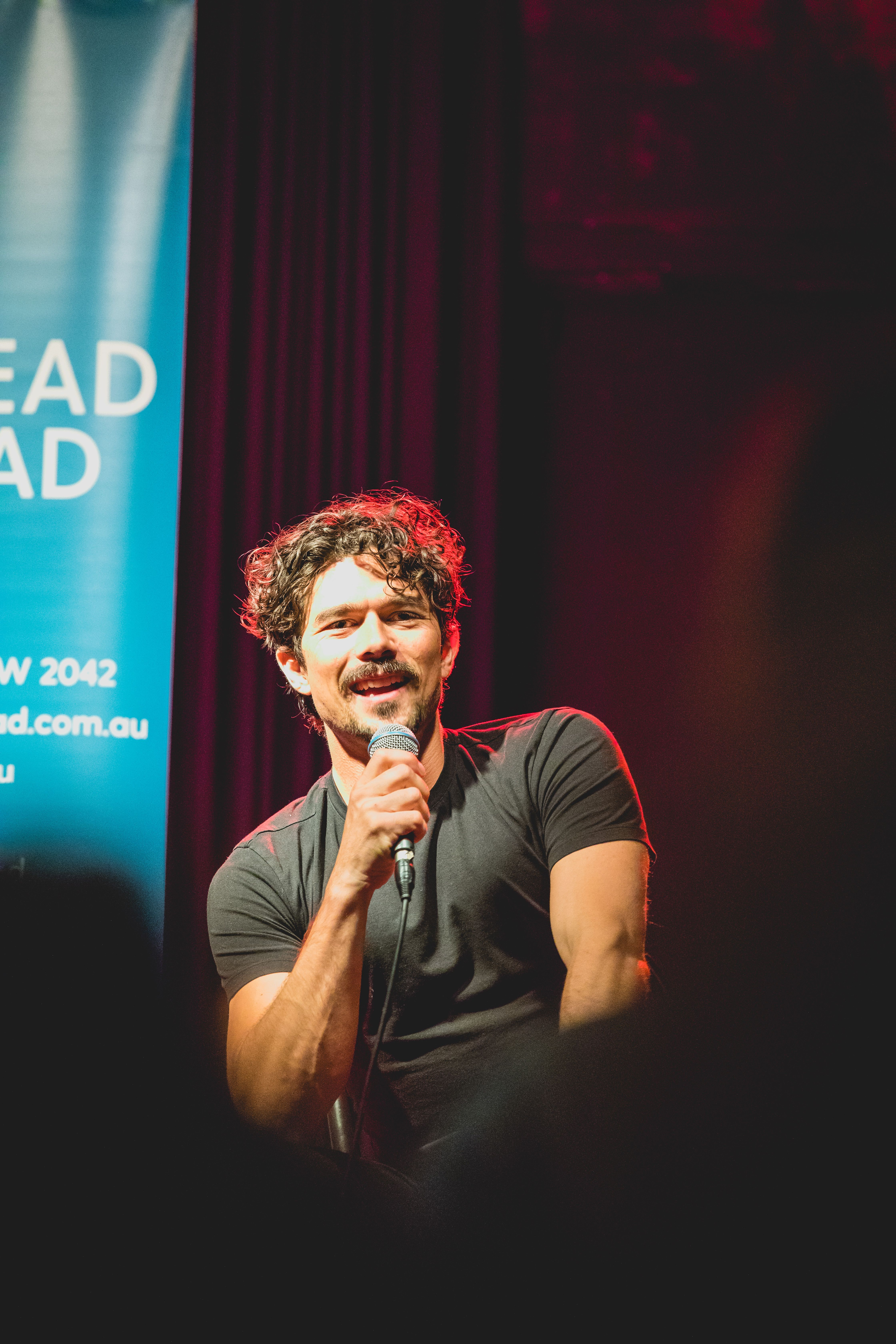
- Luke Arnold at the launch of The Last Smile in Sunder City at The Vanguard in Sydney, Australia. Photo by Marcel Bracks
- Born: 1984 (age 41–42); Adelaide, South Australia, Australia
- Occupations: Actor; author
- Writing career
- Years active: 2007–present
- Genre: Fantasy
- Notable work: Black Sails (2014–2017)

Luke Arnold (born 1984) is an Australian actor and author, who is known for portraying John Silver in the Starz drama series Black Sails (2014–2017) and INXS singer Michael Hutchence in the miniseries INXS: Never Tear Us Apart (2014).

== Early life and education ==
Luke Arnold was born in 1984 in Adelaide, South Australia, and went to primary school there until his family moved to Sydney. He moved to Queensland for his last two years of high school at Sunshine Beach High School on the Sunshine Coast.

At the age of 18, he worked as an assistant swordmaster on the 2003 film Peter Pan. He graduated from the Western Australian Academy of Performing Arts in 2006.

== Career ==
=== Acting ===
Arnold appeared on stage in Tim Conigrave's Like Stars in My Hands, directed by Robert Chuter at La Mama Courthouse, Melbourne in 2008.

In the 2000s, he appeared in television guest roles in City Homicide, McLeod's Daughters, and a recurring role in Winners & Losers in 2011.

In 2014, he appeared in two major television roles: playing INXS singer Michael Hutchence in INXS: Never Tear Us Apart, and as the pirate John Silver in the Starz drama series Black Sails. In 2017, he appeared in all six episodes of the second season of Australian paranormal drama Glitch. In 2018, he co-starred in the film Half Magic as Freedom. 2018 Arnold appeared in 7 episodes in the TV series of Salvation as Bass Shepherd.

In 2020, he took on a temporary role of Lewis Hayes in the TV soap opera Home and Away, playing a nurse with a grudge against a doctor.

In 2023, Arnold was named for the upcoming Stan production Scrublands. In 2024, Scrublands was renewed for a second season, with Arnold reprising the role.

In 2024, Arnold was announced for the second season of Last King of the Cross. On 4 September 2024, Arnold was named as part of the extended cast for SBS drama Four Years Later. 2024 Arnold appeared in 10 episodes of Nautilus as Captain Billy Millais

=== Writing ===
In January 2020, Hachette Australia published Arnold's first novel, The Last Smile in Sunder City.

== Philanthropy ==
As of July 2022, Arnold is an ambassador for Save the Children Australia.

== Bibliography ==
Arnold has a book series named The Fetch Phillips Archives, an urban fantasy story. It consists of:

- The Last Smile in Sunder City (2020)
- Dead Man in a Ditch (2020)
- One Foot in the Fade (2022)
- Whisper in the Wind (2025)

== Filmography ==
=== Film ===
Year	Title	Role	Notes
2003	Peter Pan	—N/a	Stunts
2009	Broken Hill	Tommy McAlpine	
2011	Dealing with Destiny	Blake	
2011	The Tunnel	Jim 'Tangles' Williams	
2013	Murder in the Dark	Kevin	
2018	Half Magic	Freedom	
2018	Deadman Standing	Mike McCluskie	

=== Television ===
Year	Title	Role	Notes
2007	McLeod's Daughters	Rhys Plaidy	Episode: "My Enemy, My Friend"
2008	The Elephant Princess	Jago	4 episodes
2008	The Strip	Muz	Episode: "Footballers"
2009	Rush	Constable Elliot Ryan	2 episodes
2009	Rescue Special Ops	Rick Jones	2 episodes
2010	The Pacific	Augie	Episode: "Gloucester/Pavuvu/Banika"
2011	Twentysomething	Backpacker #1	Episode: "Home Away from Home"
2011	City Homicide	Drew Preston	Episode: "Tangled Web"
2011	Panic at Rock Island	Tyson	Television film
2012	Winners & Losers	Lachie Clarke	6 episodes
2012	Lowdown	Leon	Episode: "One Fine Gay"
2012	Event Zero	Tully	Episode: "Gwen and Tully"
2014	INXS: Never Tear Us Apart	Michael Hutchence	2 episodes
2014–2017	Black Sails	John Silver	38 episodes
2016	Rush Hour	Franko	Episode: "Badass Cop"
2016	MacGyver 2016	Karl	Episode: "Pliers"
2017–2018	Stretch Armstrong and the Flex Fighters	Number Six (voice)	6 episodes
2017–2019	Glitch	Owen Nilsson	8 episodes
2018	Lethal Weapon	Alan	Episode: "One Day More"
2018	Salvation	Bass Shepherd	7 episodes
2018	For Love	Christof Dumaine	Television film
2018–2019	Box Peek	Bronze Fang	3 episodes, web series
2020	The End	Josh	10 episodes
2020–2021	Home and Away	Lewis Hayes	27 episodes
2021	Preppers	Fig	2 episodes
2022	True Colours	Nick Gawler	4 episodes
2023–2025	Scrublands	Martin Scarsden	8 episodes
2024	Nautilus	Captain Billy Millais	10 episodes
2024	Last King of the Cross	Dean Taylor	TV series
2024	Four Years Later	Matt	TV series: 2 episodes
