= List of Norwegian films of the 2010s =

The following list is of films produced in Norway in the 2010s:

== 2010s ==
Title	Director	Cast	Genre	Release date
2010
Olsenbanden jr. og Mestertyvens skatt	Arne Lindtner Næss	Jan Grønli, Thorbjørn Harr	Family	29 January 2010
East End Angels (Asfaltenglene)	Lars Berg	Espen Alknes, Vivi Andersen	Family	26 February 2010
A Somewhat Gentle Man (En ganske snill mann)	Hans Petter Moland	Jan Grønli, Thorbjørn Harr	Comedy, crime, drama	19 March 2010
Norwegian Ninja	Thomas Cappelen Malling	Mads Ousdal, Jon Øigarden	Action, comedy	13 August 2010
Limbo	Maria Sødahl	Bryan Brown, Lena Endre	Drama	10 September 2010
Happy, Happy	Anne Sewitsky	Agnes Kittelsen, Henrik Rafaelsen	Comedy	1 October 2010
The Troll Hunter	André Ovredal	Otto Jespersen	Mockumentary	11 November 2010
King of Devil's Island (Kongen av Bastøy)	Marius Holst	Stellan Skarsgård, Benjamin Helstad, Kristoffer Joner, Trond Nilssen	Drama	17 December 2010
2011
I Travel Alone (Jeg reiser alene)	Stian Kristiansen	Rolf Kristian Larsen, Gustaf Hammarsten, Ingrid Bolsø Berdal, Pål Sverre Valheim Hagen	Drama	11 February 2011
Oslo, August 31st	Joachim Trier	Anders Danielsen Lie	Drama	19 May 2011
Turn Me On, Dammit! (Få meg på, for faen)	Jannicke Systad Jacobsen	Helene Bergsholm, Arthur Berning	Comedy	19 August 2011
Headhunters	Morten Tyldum	Aksel Hennie, Nikolaj Coster-Waldau	Drama, thriller	26 August 2011
The Monitor	Pål Sletaune	Noomi Rapace, Kristoffer Joner	Thriller	7 October 2011
Jackpot (Arme Riddere)	Magnus Martens	Kyrre Hellum, Mads Ousdal, Arthur Berning, Henrik Mestad, Peter Andersson	Action, comedy, crime	2 December 2011
2012
The Orheim Company (Kompani Orheim)	Arild Andresen	Rolf Kristian Larsen, Kristoffer Joner, Arthur Berning	Drama	2 March 2012
Kon-Tiki	Joachim Rønning, Espen Sandberg,	Pål Sverre Valheim Hagen, Tobias Santelmann	Drama	24 August 2012
Flukt		Ingrid Bolsø Berdal, Tobias Santelmann	Thriller, action	28 September 2012
All That Matters Is Past (Uskyld)	Sara Johnsen	Maria Bonnevie, Kristoffer Joner, Trond Nilssen	Drama	2 November 2012
2013
Must Have Been Love (En som deg)	Eirik Svensson	Pamela Tola, Espen Klouman Høiner	Drama	1 February 2013
Chasing the Wind (Jag etter vind)	Rune Denstad Langlo	Anders Baasmo Christiansen, Marie Blokhus, Tobias Santelmann, Frederik Meldal Nørgaard	Drama	15 March 2013
I Am Yours (Jeg er din)	Iram Haq	Amrita Acharia, Ola Rapace, Tobias Santelmann	Drama	16 August 2013
Pioneer	Erik Skjoldbjærg	Aksel Hennie, Wes Bentley, Stephen Lang	Thriller	30 August 2013
Pornopung		Ole Christoffer Ertvaag, Herbert Nordrum, Anders Rydning, Gitte Witt	Comedy, drama	19 July 2013
It's Only Make Believe (Eventyrland)	Arild Østin Ommundsen	Silje Salomonsen, Vegar Hoel, Fredrik S. Hana	Crime drama	22 March 2013
Christmas Cruelty! (O'Hellige Jul!)	Magne Steinsvoll, Per-Ingvar Tomren	Tormod Lien, Eline Aasheim, Magne Steinsvoll, Per-Ingvar Tomren	Horror	13 December 2013
2014
Kule Kidz Gråter Ikke (Kool Kidz Don't Cry)	Katarina Launing	Mia Helene Solberg Brekke, Victor Papadopolous Jacobsen and Jeppe Beck Laursen	Drama	10 January 2014
In Order of Disappearance	Hans Petter Moland		Crime comedy/drama	21 February 2014
Blind	Eskil Vogt			26 February 2014
1001 Grams	Bent Hamer	Ane Dahl Torp, Laurent Stocker, Hildegun Riise	Drama	26 September 2014
Skumringslandet (The Veil of Twilight)	Paul Magnus Lundø	Leif Nygaard, Ewen Bremner, Kim Bodnia, Andreas Wilson, Jørgen Langhelle, Kristina Knaben Hennestad, Nils Utsi	Crime/fantasy	10 October 2014
2015
Homesick	Anne Sewitsky	Ine Marie Wilmann, Simon J. Berger, Anneke von der Lippe	Drama	27 March 2015
Bølgen (The Wave)	Roar Uthaug	Kristoffer Joner, Ane Dahl Torp, Jonas Hoff Oftebro	Action	28 August 2015
Hevn (Revenge)	Kjersti Steinsbø	Siren Jørgensen, Frode Winther, Maria Bock, Anders Baasmo	Drama	6 November 2015
El clásico	Halkawt Mustafa			9 December 2015
2016
Birkebeinerne (The Last King)	Nils Gaup	Jakob Oftebro, Kristofer Hivju, Torkel Dommersnes	Action, adventure	12 February 2016
Pyromaniac	Erik Skjoldbjærg	Per Frisch, Agnes Kittelsen, Trond Nilssen	Drama	22 April 2016
The Lion Woman	Vibeke Idsøe	Ida Ursin-Holm, Rolf Lassgård, Rolf Kristian Larsen	Drama	26 August 2016
Hunting Flies	Izer Aliu			10 September 2016
The King's Choice	Erik Poppe	Jesper Christensen, Anders Baasmo Christiansen, Tuva Novotny, Karl Markovics, Erik Hivju	Drama	23 September 2016
2017
Thelma	Joachim Trier	Eili Harboe, Kaya Wilkins	Supernatural drama, horror	20 August 2017
Askeladden - I Dovregubbens hall	Mikkel Brænne Sandemose	Vebjørn Enger, Eili Harboe, Allan Hyde	Fantasy, adventure	29 September 2017
The 12th Man	Harald Zwart	Thomas Gullestad, Jonathan Rhys-Meyers, Marie Blokhus	Drama, action	26 December 2017
2018
U – July 22	Erik Poppe	Andrea Berntzen	Drama, thriller	19 February 2018
Blind Spot	Tuva Novotny	Pia Tjelta, Anders Baasmo Christiansen	Drama	24 August 2018
The Quake	John Andreas Andersen	Kristoffer Joner, Ane Dahl Torp	Action	31 August 2018
KuToppen	Lise I. Osvoll	Marit Andreassen, Charlotte Frogner, Solveig Kloppen	Animation	19 October 2018
Mordene i Kongo	Marius Holst	Aksel Hennie, Tobias Santelmann, Ine F. Jansen	Crime	26 October 2018
Sonja	Anne Sewitsky	Ine Marie Wilmann, Valene Kane, Eldar Skar	Biography, drama, history	25 December 2018
2019
Psychobitch	Martin Lund	Elli Rhiannon Müller Osbourne, Jonas Tidemann	Drama	11 January 2019
Born2Drive	Daniel Fahre	Oliver Solberg, Pernilla Solberg, Petter Solberg	Documentary	8 February 2019
Amundsen	Espen Sandberg	Pål Sverre Hagen, Katherine Waterston, Trond Espen Seim	Biography, drama, history	15 February 2019
The Arctic Camels	Karl Emil Rikardsen		Documentary, adventure	15 February 2019
Out Stealing Horses	Hans Petter Moland	Stellan Skarsgård, Tobias Santelmann, Danica Curcic	Drama, mystery	8 March 2019
Askeladden – I Soria Moria Slott	Mikkel Brænne Sandemose	Vebjørn Enger, Eili Harboe	Adventure, fantasy	23 August 2019
Hjelperytteren	Jannicke Systad Jacobsen	Silje Salomonsen, Espen Klouman Høiner, Agnes Kittelsen	Dark comedy	30 August 2019
Beware of Children	Dag Johan Haugerud	Henriette Steenstrup, Jan Gunnar Røise, Thorbjørn Harr	Drama	13 September 2019
Captain Sabretooth and the Magic Diamond	Marit Moum Aune, Rasmus A. Sivertsen		Animation, family	27 September 2019
Disco	Jorunn Myklebust Syversen	Josefine Frida Pettersen	Drama	4 October 2019
Astrup: Catching the Flame	Pål Øie	Thure Lindhardt, Dennis Storhøi, Henriette Marø	Biography, drama	4 October 2019
Villmarksbarna – En eventyrlig reise	Dag Rune Johansen		Documentary	4 October 2019
Bo Bear on Holiday	Live Glesne Kjølstad	Thomas Hildebrand, Julian Lorén Larsen	Family	11 October 2019
Hope	Maria Sødahl	Andrea Bræin Hovig, Stellan Skarsgård	Drama	22 November 2019
The Tunnel	Pål Øie	Thorbjørn Harr, Ylva Lyng Fuglerud	Thriller	25 December 2019
