= Lundehaugen Upper Secondary School =

School in Sandnes, Norway

Coordinates: 58°49′38″N 5°43′33″E

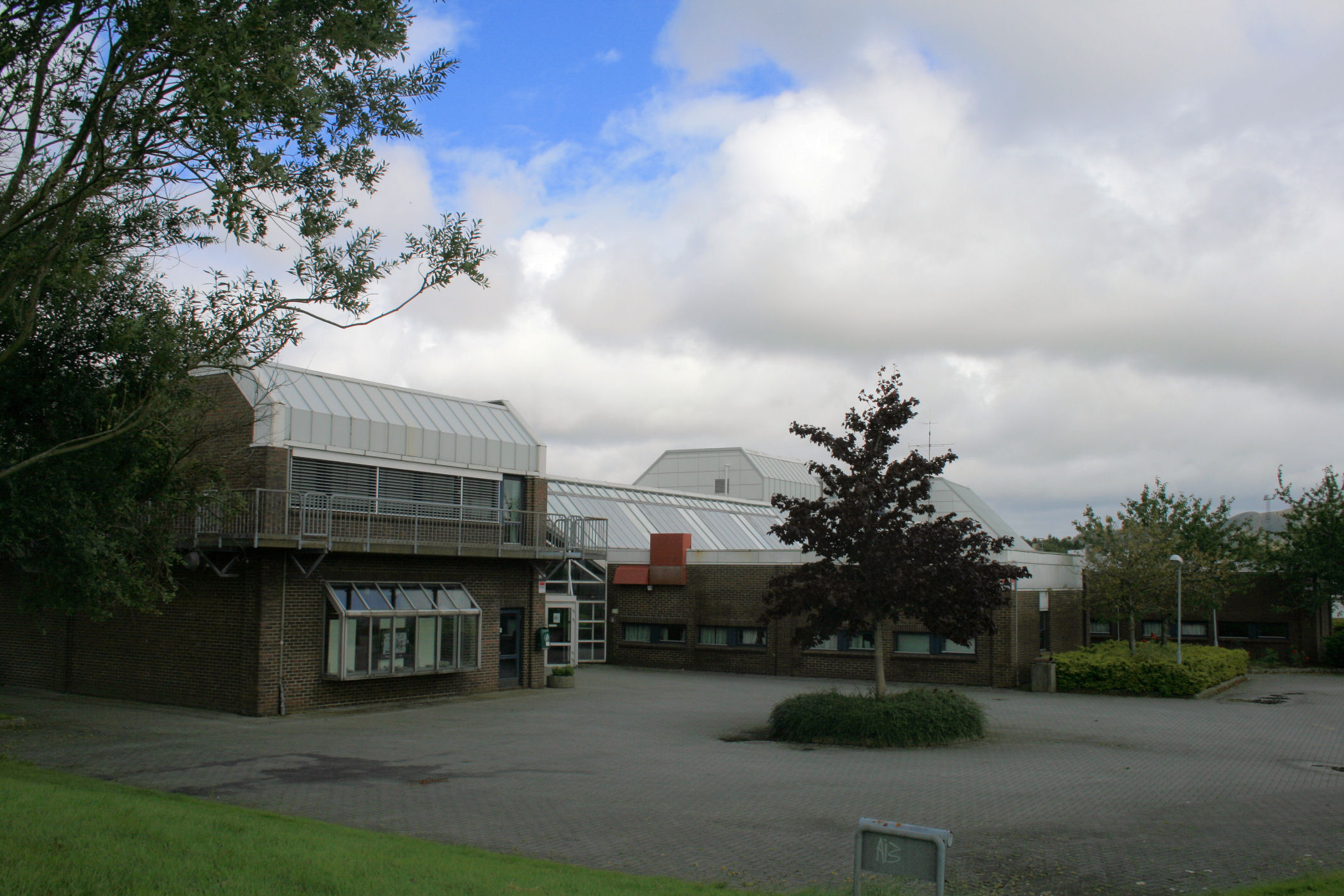
Lundehaugen Ungdomsskole

Lundehaugen (Norwegian: Lundehaugen videregående skole) was an upper secondary school in the municipality of Sandnes, Norway. The school offered several majors, mainly music, dance and drama. The school had close links with Forus Upper Secondary School. It also offered majors in media and communication and sales/services. Since the fall of 2010, Lundehaugen is no longer an upper secondary school but rather a middle school with grades 8th-10th, with higher education moving to the new Vågen Upper Secondary School.

== Formal Alumni ==
- Kristoffer Joner (actor)
- Thomas Dybdahl (musician, singer and songwriter)
- Rolf Kristian Larsen (actor)
