= Kurt Josef Wagle and the Legend of the Fjord Witch =

- Directed by: Tommy Wirkola
- Written by: Stig Frode Henriksen; Tommy Wirkola
- Produced by: Terje Strømstad; Kjetil Omberg
- Starring: Stig Frode Henriksen; Jørn Tore Nilsen; Jeppe Beck Laursen; Kristoffer Joner; Cecilie Mosli
- Cinematography: Matt Weston
- Edited by: Tommy Wirkola
- Distributed by: Euforia Film
- Release date: 5 March 2010
- Running time: 82 minutes
- Country: Norway
- Language: Norwegian

Kurt Josef Wagle and the Legend of the Fjord Witch (Norwegian: Kurt Josef Wagle og legenden om fjordheksa) is a mockumentary directed by Tommy Wirkola. It premiered on 5 March 2010.

The film follows Kurt Josef Wagle (Stig Frode Henriksen), who ventures into the forrest to search for his missing son, Tordenskjold. He is accompanied by the teacher Gregor (Kristoffer Joner), the clairvoyant Lillian (Cecilie Mosli), police chief Burt Erik (Jeppe Beck Laursen), and the entertainer Rock (Jørn Tore Nilsen).

This was Tommy Wirkola's fourth film as a director. As of 10 june 2010, the film had been seen by a total of 23,643 people in Norwegian cinemas.

== Cast ==
- Kurt Josef Wagle – Stig Frode Henriksen
- Rock Fjellstad – Jørn Tore Nilsen
- Tordenskjold Wagle – Martin Hykkerud
- Lillian Mulder – Cecilie Mosli
- Gregor Hykkerud – Kristoffer Joner
- Burt Erik Johansen – Jeppe Beck Laursen
- Toill Kåre – Bjørn Sundquist
- Fjordheksa – Julia Schacht
- Troy – Martin Hovden

== Sequel ==
A sequel, titled Kurt Josef Wagle and the Murder Mystery on the Hurtigruta, was released in 2017. The film serves as a prequel to the original, being set earlier in the timeline. It premiered on 24 November 2017.
