= See You Tomorrow =

See You Tomorrow may refer to:

- See You Tomorrow (novel), a 2013 novel by Tore Renberg
- See You Tomorrow (2016 film), a Chinese-Hong Kong romantic comedy film
- See You Tomorrow (2013 film), an Italian comedy film
- See You Tomorrow (album), a 2020 album by The Innocence Mission
- Så møtes vi imorgen, a 1946 Norwegian drama film called "See You Tomorrow" in English

== See also ==
- See You Tomorrow, Everyone, a 2013 Japanese film
