= Lygre =

Lygre is a surname. Notable people with the surname include:

- Arne Lygre (born 1968), Norwegian novelist and playwright
- Aslaug Låstad Lygre (1910–1966), Norwegian poet
