= Dybvig =

Dybvig is a surname. Notable people with the surname include:

- Evan Dybvig (born 1975), American skier
- Per Dybvig (born 1964), Norwegian illustrator, visual artist, and animator
- Philip H. Dybvig (born 1955), American economist
  - Diamond–Dybvig model
- R. Kent Dybvig, American professor
