= Dark Woods =

Villmark
- Film poster
- Directed by: Pål Øie
- Written by: Christopher Grøndahl
- Produced by: Jan Aksel Angeltvedt
- Starring: Kristoffer Joner; Bjørn Floberg; Marko Iversen Kanic; Eva Röse; Sampda Sharma
- Music by: Trond Bjerknes
- Distributed by: ORO Film AS
- Release date: 21 February 2003
- Running time: 85 minutes
- Country: Norway
- Language: Norwegian

Dark Woods (Norwegian: Villmark, lit. "Wilderness") is a 2003 Norwegian horror film directed by Pål Øie. The tagline—"De skulle holdt seg unna det vannet"—translates to "They should've stayed away from that lake".

The theatrical premiere sold 150,000 tickets in Norway, and was therefore picked up for a German language release by Atlas Film + Medien, and a Chinese language release in Taiwan by Horng En Culture. The film received two nominations for the Amanda award in the categories of best Norwegian film and best male actor (Kristoffer Joner), though it did not win in any of the categories.

A sequel, Villmark Asylum, was released in October 2015, which was set in the defunct sanatorium Harastølen.

== Plot ==
The broadcasting company, Real TV, plans to head into the woods to film a reality TV series where contestants try to survive in the wilderness without aid for four days. Before the filming, in an effort to create bonds between the members of Real TV's production team, Gunnar—the boss—decides that they should try the experience for themselves.

Four individuals, friends Lasse and Per, Swedish girl Elin, and new girl Sara, make up Gunnar's production crew. Gunnar visits a log house where he used to spend his summers as a child to put his new hires to the test. The cabin is set far from civilization, tucked up in the shadowy, eerie woods. The group must survive a weekend while foraging for sustenance from the natural world—neither cigarettes nor cell phones are permitted.

The gang is put to the test when Lasse and Per discover a lifeless body in a lake close to the cottage. Gunnar advises them to continue their weekend without telling Sara and Elin about what they discovered. However, the group encounters more incidents resulting in suspicion, skepticism, and accusations.

== Production ==
Dark Woods, being Pål Øie's first full-length film, was shot over the course of 24 days in September 2002 in Kaupanger, Sogn. The script was written in close association with Christopher Grøndahl, with notable input from the actors during the filming, especially Kristoffer Joner. The film cost approximately 10 million Norwegian kroner to make.

== Release ==
Dark Woods was pre-screened with friends of the director in Stavanger ahead of the theatrical release on 21 February 2003. The film was released on DVD on 10 September 2003 by Scanbox Entertainment, and was later rereleased on DVD and Video on demand in 2014 by Warner Bros. Entertainment, with plans for Blu-ray in 2015.

== Reception ==
Professional ratings
Review scores
Source	Rating
Filmpolitiet	4/6 stars
NRK	6/6 stars

The German TV Spielfilm described the film as "creepier than real reality TV", commending the film's atmosphere, characters and scares. Birger Vestmo of Filmpolitiet likewise praised the atmosphere of the film, in addition to the actors' performance, noting that they actually seem scared, and that their dialogue appeared natural. Conversely, he felt the story lacking, remarking that the film started to become boring halfway through, with the characters wandering aimlessly through the woods.

In a survey conducted in October 2008 by Dagbladet to commemorate the theatrical premiere of the horror film Cold Prey 2, readers were asked to select the "scariest Norwegian horror movie". Dark Woods won with 41% of the vote, outcompeting Cold Prey's 32% and Lake of the Dead's 21%.

== Legacy ==
In later retrospectives of the "horror boom" in Norwegian film, characterised by the use of natural environments like mountains and forests, Dark Woods has been seen as instrumental in its genesis.
