= Gunnar Vikene =

Norwegian film director

- Born: 23 March 1966 (age 59)
- Occupation: Film director
- Years active: 2002–present
- Awards: Amanda Award (2010); Gullruten (2018)

Gunnar Vikene (born 23 March 1966) is a Norwegian film director and scriptwriter. His films include Falling Sky from 2002, and War Sailor from 2022. He received an Amanda Award in 2010 for the film Vegas, and a Gullruten award in 2018 for the television series Grenseland.

== Biography ==
Vikene was born on 23 March 1966.

Having previously made short films and documentaries, including the short films Kinobilletten (1995) and Digre daier (1997), his first feature film was Himmelfall from 2002, and he directed the film Trigger in 2006. He received the Amanda Award for Best Screenplay 2010, for the film Vegas, shared with Torun Lian. He wrote the script for and directed the film Her er Harold in 2014, which stars Bjørn Sundquist in the title role, for which Sundquist won an Amanda Award for best actor. He was awarded Gullruten for best direction in 2018 for the television series Grenseland. He was co-director for the television series Pørni, for which he was shortlisted for the Gullruten award in 2022.

Launched at the 2022 Toronto International Film Festival, his film War Sailor stars Kristoffer Joner, Pål Sverre Hagen and Ine Marie Wilmann. It was announced as Norway's submission for Best International Feature at the 95th Academy Awards. The film received four prizes at the 2023 Amanda Awards: Pål Sverre Hagen for best actor, Ine Marie Wilmann as best actress in a supporting role, Stefanie Bieker for best costume design, and Espen Rønning and Bent Holm for best sound design.

== Filmography ==
- 1995: Kinobilletten (short film)
- 1997: Digre daier (short film)
- 2002: Himmelfall
- 2006: Trigger
- 2010: Vegas
- 2014: Her er Harold
- 2022: War Sailor
