= Tore Renberg =

Norwegian writer (born 1972)

- Renberg in 2026; Photo: Birgit Fostervold
- Born: 3 August 1972 (age 54); Stavanger, Norway
- Occupations: Author, novelist
- Children: Petra Renberg, Allan Renberg
- Writing career
- Genre: Fiction
- Website: torerenberg.no

Tore Renberg is a Norwegian writer and musician. He is the author of several books within various genres, including novels, short stories and children's books, as well as writing for film and stage. His work has been translated into copious languages.

== Early years ==
Tore Renberg was born in 1972 in Madla, a suburb to Stavanger, the oil capital of Norway. His mother, Mirjam Elisabeth Renberg, worked for the state roads of Norway, his father, Jan Renberg, was both a teacher and an accountant. Tore Renberg attended Madlavoll elementary school and Gosen high school,

From an early age, Tore Renberg developed a profound enthusiasm for literature. Amongst his first infatuations were the Norwegian fairy tales, Roald Dahl´s epics, the fantasy work of C.S. Lewis and J.R.R. Tolkien. Renberg's obsession with music was clear from the beginning. As a child his grandmother, Esther Elisabeth Ludvigsen, taught him the piano, he took violin lessons, and picked up the guitar at the age of 13. Renberg has often mentioned Duran Duran as a great favourite during his teenage years. He was also at one point a member of the Frankie Goes To Hollywood fanclub. Renberg devoted a lot of time to playing football with local club Vidar (position: striker).

== Formative years ==
When an adolescent, Renberg left the world of fantasy and fairy-tales. At the age of 14 he was obsessed with Sue Townsend's The Diary of Adrian Mole, and soon after he encountered the works of writers such as Charles Dickens, Alexander Kielland and Tarjei Vesaas, all of whom would inspire the young writer. At the same time his interest in music shifted towards the growing indie-scene of the eighties, with artists such as The Smiths, Imperiet (later Thåström), The Cure, deLillos, The Jesus & Mary Chain, Depeche Mode, R.E.M., Japan, Nick Cave & The Bad Seeds.

Renberg wrote his first poem on 26 December 1986. The poem dealt with his father's drinking habit, and Renberg has said that he considers that day the beginning of his writing career. In the following months he developed a habit of writing poems, and it is also in this crucial period of his life that Renberg reads the one novel that he has repeated over and over again to be life-changing and a turning point: Dostoevsky's Crime and Punishment. After reading the Russian classic, fourteen-year-old Tore Renberg wrote in his diary: "I am going to be a writer," and in the years to come he sat down every day after school to write song lyrics, poems and short stories.

In these formative years Renberg also spent a lot of time at his home town theatre, Rogaland Theatre, a stage where he got to play in Torbjørn Egner's Hakkebakkeskogen, Bugsy Malone and Charlie and the Chocolate Factory (where he played Willy Wonka). After Gosen high school Renberg attended the gymnasium Stavanger Cathedral School (Kongsgård) in the town centre of Stavanger. Here he engaged both in the school theatre, Idun's Christmas Comedy (both as theatre director and actor in Shakespeare's A Midsummer Nights Dream), and the school paper, Lille Marius, where he worked as a critic of literature, film and music, and also submitted poems. At Kongsgård Renberg met several radical and free-thinking characters who had a great impact on him, amongst them the (in)famous Norwegian Communist Aslak Sira Myhre. Whilst attending gymnasium, Renberg continued writing. In 1989 he submitted his first collection of poems to several Norwegian publishing houses, only to receive letters of refusal. This happened four times a year in the following years.

After the gymnasium Renberg left to study in Bergen. As a young student of literature in the coastal town, he was deep into Marcel Proust. He wrote a term paper on the use of names in In Search of Lost Time. He also studied philosophy and was heavily into the works of Jacques Derrida and Hegel. In Bergen Renberg met his now long term friend and colleague, Karl Ove Knausgård, as reported in Knausgård's My Struggle. Together they would write, discuss, drink, go to gigs and work for the student radio and the student paper. They both shared the dreams and aspirations of becoming a writer, and developed a habit of reading each other's literature.

Tore Renberg went on to become a literary critic, and he continued submitting manuscripts to several Norwegian publishing houses with no luck. Until 1995, when he was discovered by the influential editor Geir Gulliksen at Tiden Norsk Forlag.

== Literary career ==
Renberg's first book Sleeping Tangle received critical acclaim by critic and author Linn Ullmann, and the book was awarded the Tarjei Vesaas First Book Award.

In the years to come, Renberg struggled to find his own voice, and published experimental works, such as the grotesque novel Purification (1998) about a religious mass-murderer and the wildly speculative science fiction A Fine Time (2000); a novel about the future, supposedly written by one Tore Renberg in 1926.

The literary breakthrough came when Renberg started relying on more familiar and for him, dangerous – material. In 2003 he published the novel The Man Who Loved Yngve. It is a realistic novel set in Renbergs own hometown and has a main character attending Stavanger Cathedral School. The novel captures a specific time and sensibility, and the protagonist Jarle Klepp is now a household name in Norway. The book has sold 150 000 copies, it is translated into 7 languages and made into a film (The Man Who Loved Yngve, director: Stian Kritiansen). Since then Renberg went on to write four more books about Jarle Klepp, the most acclaimed of these being the highly autobiographical The Orheim Company, now a modern Norwegian classic, where the writer tackles the topic of his first poem from 1986 over the course of nearly 500 pages; his father's alcohol abuse or alcoholism.

In 2011 came the book At Party With Literature, a collection of essays and lectures where Renberg explores the joys of being a reader, introducing some of his finest reading experiences: Honoré de Balzac, Selma Lagerlöf and Halldór Laxness.

Autumn 2013 saw a significant turn in Renberg's career as a writer: the epic neo-noir See You Tomorrow, applauded by critics calling it "a masterpiece", "a tour de force", "a thriller with empathy".

Renberg has written several books for children.

== Bibliography ==
- 1995: Sovende floke (short prose)
- 1996: Matriarkat (novel)
- 1996: Sinus i Sinus (children’s novel) – illustrated by Per Dybvig
- 1997: Mamma, pappa, barn (prose)
- 1997: Sinus i blinde (children’s novel) – illustrated by Per Dybvig
- 1998: Renselse (novel)
- 1999: Hando. Kjendo. Søndag. (children’s novel) – illustrated by Kim Hiortøy
- 2000: En god tid (novel)
- 2000: Hando. Kjendo. Torsdag. (children’s novel) – illustrated by Kim Hiortøy
- 2001: Varmelager fem (prose/collage)
- 2002: Trillefolket. Hva hendte med Kajartan?(children’s novel) – illustrated by Per Dybvig
- 2006: Farmor har kabel-TV / Videogutten (two novels in one book)
- 2009: Sovende floke og tidligere tekster 1987-1995 (revised ed. prose)
- 2010: Gi gass, Ine (children’s novel) – illustrated by Øyvind Torseter
- 2011: He he, Hasse (children’s novel) – illustrated by Øyvind Torseter
- 2011: Sonny (play)
- 2012: På fest hos litteraturen (lecture series from 2009)
- 2013: Vaffelmøkk (children’s novel) – illustrated by Øyvind Torseter
- 2015: Femti flotte år med Frode Kommedal (play)
- 2016: Du er så lys (novel)
- 2016: Jenny (children’s novel) – illustrated by Lene Ask
- 2019: Ingen tid å miste (novel)
- 2020: Tollak til Ingeborg (novel)
- 2023: Lungeflyteprøven. Forsvar for en ung kvinne som var mistenkt for spedbarnsdrap (novel)
- 2024: Aktivisten. Et essay om Christian Thomasius og hans tid (essay)
- 2024: Lorden (novel)

Jarle Klepp series:

- 2003: Mannen som elsket Yngve (novel)
- 2005: Kompani Orheim (novel)
- 2008: Charlotte Isabel Hansen (novel)
- 2009: Pixley Mapogo (novel)
- 2011: Dette er mine gamle dager (novel)

Teksas series:

- 2013: Vi ses i morgen (novel)
- 2014: Angrep fra alle kanter (novel)
- 2017: Skada gods (novel)
- 2021: Assalamu alaikum (novel)

== Awards and nominations ==
Awards

- 1996 Tiden Prize
- 1996 Tarjei Vesaas First Book Prize
- 1998 Henrik Steffens Endowment, Germany
- 2004 Siddis Prize
- 2005 NRK P2 Listeners' Prize
- 2008 Norwegian Booksellers' Prize
- 2008 Stavanger County Culture Prize
- 2008 Stavanger kommunes kulturpris
- 2010 Norwegian Culture Council Prize
- 2014 Stavanger Aftenblads Culture Prize
- 2014 Stavanger Aftenblads kulturpris

Nominations

- 2005 Brage Prize
- 2005 Young Critics' Prize
- 2005 Dagbladet's Novel of the Year
- 2008 Nordic Council Film Prize
- 2010 Critics Prize for
- 2013 Booksellers’ Prize for See You Tomorrow
- 2014 Booksellers’ Prize for Attack From All Sides

== Other careers ==
Renberg has also written theatrical plays and film scripts:

- The Orheim Company, film 2012, based on the novel
- Video Boy, short-film script 2011, based on the novel
- Sonny, libretto for the musical, Rogaland Theatre 2011, lyrics and music: Kaizers Orchestra
- I Travel Alone, film script 2010, based on the novel Charlotte Isabel Hansen
- The Man Who Loved Yngve, film script 2008, based on the novel -
- The Thousandth Heart, theatrical play for youth and children, Rogaland Theatre 2007, music: Janove Ottesen
- The Spider Party, short-film script 2006
- Alt For Egil, film script 2004

Renberg has worked as a critic and a TV-host of the program Leseforeningen. Renberg is a musician and has played in several bands. One of them is Lemen, with Tore Renberg as vocalist and Karl Ove Knausgård on drums. They existed from 1994 to 1995 and performed two gigs. Lemen reformed in the autumn of 2014, and played four gigs as a part of Renberg's book tour for his new novel, Attack From All Sides.
