= Alt for Egil =

Alt For Egil
- Directed by: Tore Rygh
- Written by: Tore Renberg; Tore Rygh
- Starring: Kristoffer Joner; Trond Høvik
- Release date: 20 August 2004
- Running time: 90 minutes
- Country: Norway
- Language: Norwegian

Alt For Egil is a 2004 Norwegian musical film directed by Tore Rygh, starring Kristoffer Joner and Trond Høvik. Egil Hjelmeland (Joner) is a pizza delivery driver who decides to teach his best friend Jan-Ove Tofte (Høvik), who is intellectually disabled, how to drive the delivery car. The title is a play on 'Alt for Norge' (Norwegian: All for Norway) which is a patriotic Norwegian motto dating to World War II.

== Reception ==
Borghild Maaland of Verdens Gang gave the movie a "die throw" of four, and called it "a pretty nice love-story". Inger Bentzrud of Dagbladet gave it five points, calling it "cheeky and different". She particularly appreciated the musical score, and the film's local atmosphere.
