= Naboer =

2005 Norwegian film directed by Pål Sletaune

Naboer Next Door
- Directed by: Pål Sletaune
- Written by: Pål Sletaune
- Produced by: Pål Sletaune; Turid Øversvee
- Starring: Kristoffer Joner; Cecilie Mosli; Julia Schacht; Anna Bache-Wiig
- Cinematography: John Andreas Andersen
- Edited by: John Andreas Andersen; Darek Hodor
- Music by: Simon Boswell
- Distributed by: Columbia TriStar
- Release date: 10 March 2005
- Running time: 75 minutes
- Country: Norway
- Language: Norwegian
- Budget: NOK 15,155,100 (estimated)
- Box office: $1,277,769

Naboer (English: Next Door) is a 2005 Norwegian psychological thriller film, directed by Pål Sletaune. In the movie, the protagonist John (Kristoffer Joner) is drawn into a violent, sexual game by his two beautiful female neighbours. Naboer received an over-18 rating in Norway, which had only happened to four Norwegian movies before. Upon release it was well received by critics. Sletaune stated "I worked hard with Kristoffer Joner to make the character into something which would interest the audience".

== Plot ==
The main character, John (played by Kristoffer Joner), has just been dumped by his girlfriend Ingrid (Anna Bache-Wiig). He then becomes acquainted with his next-door neighbours, the beautiful sisters Anne (Cecilie Mosli) and Kim (Julia Schacht). The sisters know a strange amount of detail about him and it soon becomes clear that he is being entrapped in a twisted, psychological game.

== Cast ==
Actor	Character
Kristoffer Joner	John
Cecilie Mosli	Anne
Julia Schacht	Kim
Anna Bache-Wiig	Ingrid
Michael Nyqvist	Ake
Øystein Martinsen	Peter
Odd Arno Midtsjø	Gammel Mann
Magne Kipperrud	Kollega

== Production ==
The movie was highly anticipated in Norway, particularly because of certain scenes with highly violent and sexual content. For its cinematic review, Naboer received an over-18 rating, which had only happened to four Norwegian movies before, namely Pål Bang-Hansen's Douglas in 1970, Per Blom's Mother's house in 1974, Lasse Glomm's Stop it! in 1980 and Svend Wam's Hotel St. Pauli in 1987.

== Reception ==
At the time, Norwegian reviewers were highly positive to the movie. Jon Selås, writing for Verdens Gang, gave the movie six out of six points. Selås called Joner's performance the best of his career. Dagbladet's Inger Bentzrud called the movie "intelligent", and gave it five out of six points. The movie was seen by 108,096 people in Norway.

Internationally, The Village Voice appreciated "the brilliant art direction and a gift for tension" but criticised the "classic misogynist panic" of the ending. The Cineuropa review praised the "excellent cinematography, production design and a haunting score". Adrian Wootton commented that Naboer was "very high quality film-making and a roller coaster ride that you are unlikely to forget".

As of 2019, Naboer consistently features in top ten lists of Scandinavian horror films.

== Box office ==
The film took $1,277,769 worldwide after its release in 2005. When it was re-released in 2006, it took $19,677.

== Awards ==
- Kristoffer Joner won the 2005 Amanda Award for best actor at the Norwegian International Film Festival
- The film won the 2005 Méliès d'Argent award from the Cinénygma Luxembourt International Film Festival and received a Special Mention from Jury of Grand Prix Cinénygma.
- Young European Jury Award at 2006 Rouen Nordic Film Festival
- Black Tulip Award at the 2006 Amsterdam Fantastic Film Festival
