= Sandmann – Historien om en sosialistisk supermann =

2005 documentary by Jannicke Systad Jackobsen

- Written by: Jannicke Systad Jacobsen
- Directed by: Jannicke Systad Jacobsen
- Country of origin: Norway

Production
- Running time: 51 minutes

Original release
- Release: 17 October 2005

Sandmann – Historien om en sosialistisk supermann ('Sandmann – the History of a Socialist Superman') is a Norwegian 52-minute-long documentary by Jannicke Systad Jacobsen from 2005. The documentary looks back on the rise and fall of the East-German socialism through the tales of Sandmann of Sandmännchen.
