= Olaug Nilssen =

Norwegian writer (born 1977)

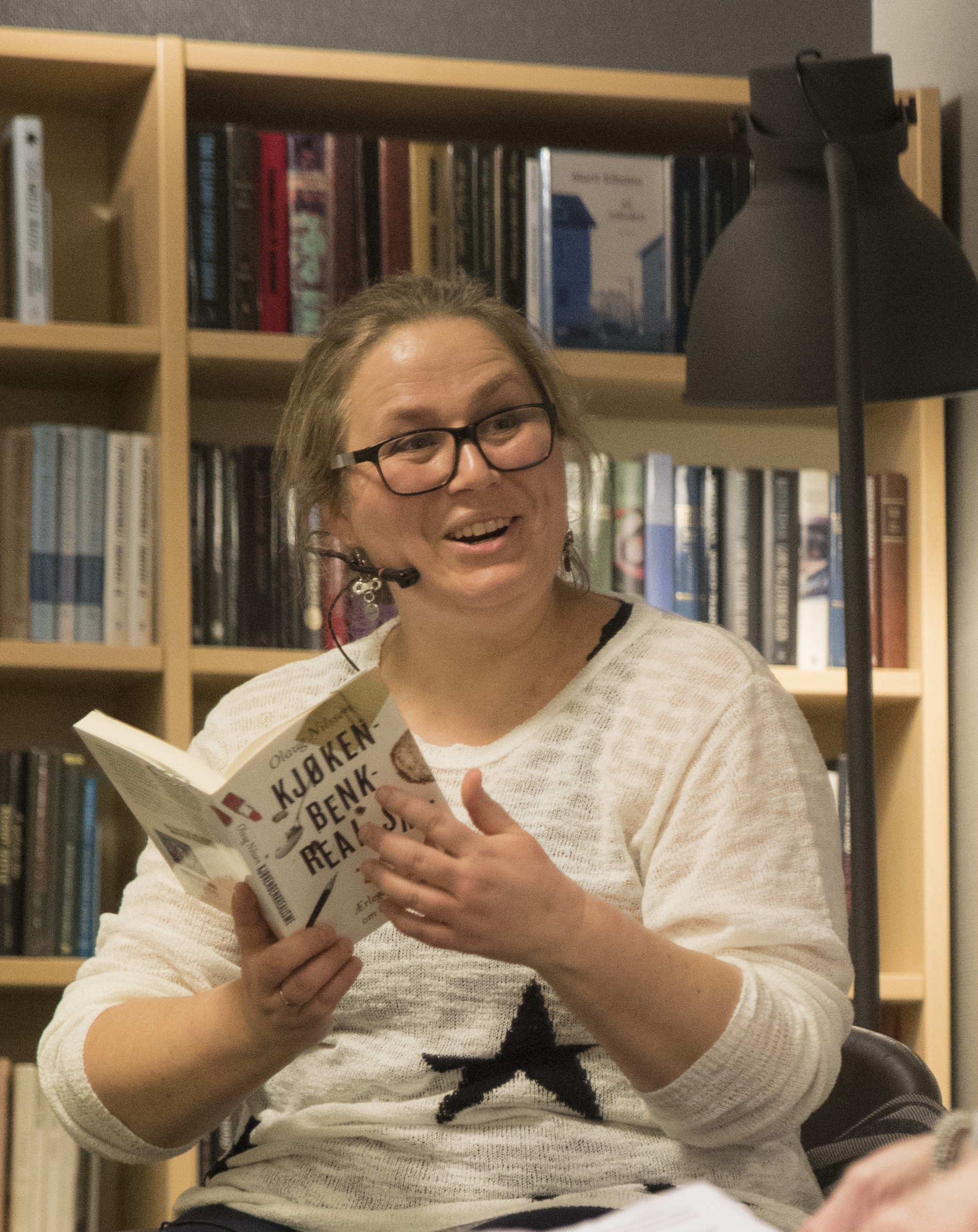
- Olaug Nilssen reads from her book Kjøkkenbenkrealisme at an event in Oslo Public Library, Majorstuen.
- Born: 28 December 1977 (age 48); Førde, Norway
- Education: University of Bergen
- Occupations: Novelist, playwright, children's writer, essayist and magazine editor
- Notable work: Tung tids tale (2017)
- Awards: Brage Prize (2017); Nynorsk Literature Prize (2017); Dobloug Prize (2019); Fritt Ord Award (2021); Amalie Skram Prize (2024)

Olaug Nilssen (born 28 December 1977) is a Norwegian novelist, playwright, children's writer, essayist and magazine editor.

She was awarded the Brage Prize and the Nynorsk Literature Prize in 2017, both for the novel Tung tids tale. She received the Dobloug Prize in 2019, and the Fritt Ord Award in 2021.

== Personal life and education ==
Nilssen was born in Førde Municipality on 28 December 1977.

She graduated as cand.mag. in North Germanic languages, sociology and literary science from the University of Bergen.

== Career ==
Among Nilssen's early novels are Innestengt i udyr from 1998 and Vi har så korte armar from 2002. In 2004 she published the children's book Ronnys rumpe, and in 2005 the essays collection Hybrideleg sjølvgransking.

Her novel Få meg på, for faen from 2005 was adapted for theatre, and was also basis for the 2011 film Turn Me On, Dammit!, directed by Jannicke Systad Jacobsen and starring Helene Bergsholm. The film received the Screenplay award at the 2011 Tribeca Film Festival. It also won the Amanda Award for 2012 for best Norwegian film.

Her theatrical debut was the play Skyfri himmel, which was staged at Rogaland Teater in 2006. She wrote the book Nesten frelst av Sigvart Dagsland in 2009, and the interview book Kjøkkenbenkrealisme. Ærlege historier om tidsklemma in 2012. She wrote the play Stort og stygt for the centennial of Det Norske Teatret in 2013.

Her novel Tung tids tale from 2017 earned her the Brage Prize, as well as the Nynorsk Literature Prize. The novel describes how it is like to be the mother of a child with disabilities. She was awarded the Dobloug Prize in 2019. She wrote the satirical book Ikkje tenk på det in 2019, and the humoristic novel Yt etter evne, få etter behov in 2020. In 2023 she wrote the novel Uønska åtferd, about a dysfunctional family.

She received the Fritt Ord Award in 2021, shared with Bjørn Hatterud and Jan Grue, for their contributions to freedom of speech in Norway by drawing attention to the barriers faced by disabled persons. She was awarded the Amalie Skram Prize in 2024, when the jury pointed at tempereature, will, neutrality, curiosity and opposition as elements in Nilssen's writing.

Nilssen has contributed to the literary magazine Vagant. She co-founded the magazine Kraftsentrum in 2005, along with Gunnhild Øyehaug, and was co-editor of the magazine until 2008. She was a member of Norsk kulturråd from 2010 to 2012.

Awards
Preceded by Deeyah Khan	Recipient of the Fritt Ord Award shared with Bjørn Hatterud and Jan Grue; 2021	Succeeded by Meduza
