= Falling Sky (2002 film) =

- Directed by: Gunnar Vikene
- Starring: Kristoffer Joner; Maria Bonnevie; Kim Bodnia
- Cinematography: Sjur Aarthun
- Release date: October 18, 2002
- Running time: 100 minutes
- Country: Norway
- Language: Norwegian

Falling Sky is a 2002 Norwegian drama film directed by Gunnar Vikene.

== Cast ==
- Kristoffer Joner - Reidar
- Maria Bonnevie - Juni
- Kim Bodnia - Johannes
- Hildegun Riise - Vigdis
- Gitte Rio Jørgensen - Fru Ruud
- Endre Hellestveit - Thomas
