= Hidden (2009 film) =

- Promotional poster
- Directed by: Pål Øie
- Written by: Pål Øie
- Produced by: Jan Aksel Angeltvedt
- Starring: Kristoffer Joner; Karin Park; Bjarte Hjelmeland
- Cinematography: Sjur Aarthun
- Edited by: Lars Apneseth
- Music by: Trond Bjerknes
- Production companies: Alligator Film; Film Fund FUZZ
- Distributed by: Sandrew Metronome Norge; Alligator Film; After Dark Films
- Release date: 3 April 2009
- Running time: 96 minutes
- Country: Norway
- Language: Norwegian
- Budget: 12.6 million Norwegian Krone

Hidden (Norwegian: Skjult) is a 2009 Norwegian psychological horror film written and directed by Pål Øie, which stars Kristoffer Joner, Karin Park and Bjarte Hjelmeland.

== Plot ==
A small boy runs as fast as he can through a pitch-dark forest. Blinded by fear, the kid runs across a forest road without seeing the trailer truck coming. The truck misses the boy, with the driver starting to lose control of the vehicle. This triggers a chain reaction that leaves another boy without his family, who are killed when the trailer crashes into their car.

After his mother's death, KK (Kai Koss) returns to his hometown to settle her affairs. He has been away for 19 years, trying to escape and forget about his mother's cruel treatment of him. He soon realizes that he can't outrun his past. Various visions of the past haunt the protagonist as he visits his ancestral house. At one point, he decides to burn the house, but is deterred by the local police women. In the final catharsis of the protagonist, he pushes his diabolical half-burned brother Peter off the waterfall. In the end, the police arrest KK for various murders which seem to have been committed by the alter ego, Peter. The audience is left to question whether Peter is real or just a manifestation of KK's mangled, distorted past.

== Cast ==
- Kristoffer Joner as Kai Koss
- Anders Danielsen Lie as Peter
- Karin Park as Miriaim
- Bjarte Hjelmeland as Frode
- Arthur Berning as Svenna
- Marko Iversen Kanic as Roy
- Cecilie A. Mosli as Sara

== Production ==
Hidden was produced by Alligator in Bergen, and the movie budget was slated by 12.6 million Norwegian krone.

== Release ==
The film has received international attention as one of the featured films of the After Dark Horrorfest 4 and ran on 29 January 2010. The other seven films which ran at After Dark Horrorfest are Dread, The Graves, Lake Mungo, ZMD: Zombies of Mass Destruction, The Final, The Reeds and Kill Theory.
