= Bastøy Prison =

Prison on Bastøy Island, Norway

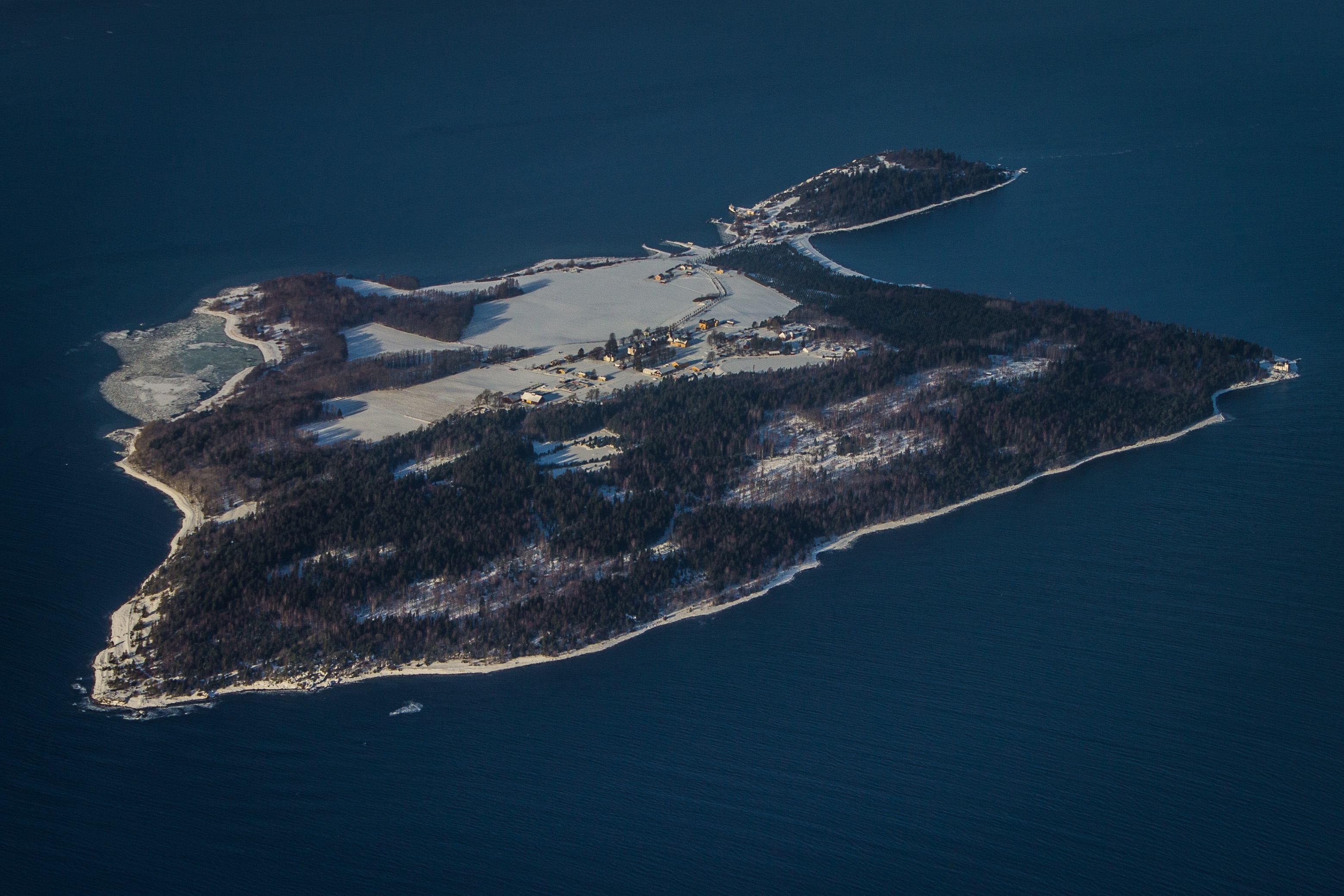
- Bastøy Prison from the air
- Interactive map of Bastøy Prison
- Location: Bastøy Island, Norway; 59°22′48.55″N 10°31′29.65″E
- Status: Operational
- Security class: Minimum
- Website: Bastøy fengsel

Bastøy Prison (Norwegian: Bastøy fengsel) is a low-security, male-only prison on Bastøy Island in Horten Municipality, Norway. The facility is located about 75 kilometres (47 mi) south of Oslo on a 2.6 square kilometres (1.0 sq mi) island in the Ytre Oslofjord. The prison hosts 115 inmates, making it the largest low-security prison in Norway. Arne Kvernvik-Nilsen, governor of the prison, leads a staff of 69 prison employees. Of this staff, only 5 employees remain on the island overnight. The prison is about one hour commuting distance from Oslo.

Once a prison colony for young boys, the facility is trying to become "the first ecological prison in the world". Recidivism has been reported at 16%, compared to the European average of around 70%. Inmates are housed in wooden cottages and work the prison farm. During their free time, inmates have access to horseback riding, fishing, tennis, and cross-country skiing. The only access to the prison is from a ferry that departs from Horten.

== Bastøy Boys' Home insurrection ==
Before the current prison, the island was occupied by a juvenile detention centre, Bastøy Boys' Home. The Norwegian government purchased the island in 1898 for 95,000 kroner, and the reformatory opened in 1900. In 1915, it was the site of an insurrection by the boys which was suppressed by the Norwegian military; this event was later dramatised in the 2010 film, King of Devil's Island. The Boys' Home was taken over by the Norwegian government in 1953 and shut down in 1970.

The rebellion occurred on 20 May 1915, when between 30 and 40 boys rallied around four youths who had escaped and been recaptured. The group refused to work, armed themselves with farming tools and stones, cut the telephone lines and then burned down the barn with stolen matches and cigars. The same barn had been burned down two years before.

When instructors and guards failed to quell the riot, the military was called in. Over a hundred troops stormed the island. Also on scene were two seaplanes, two submarines, and the armored ship "Norway" from the naval base Karljohansvern in Horten. Several of the boys escaped into the forest but were later recaptured. Officials identified the ringleader of the rioters as a newly arrived 18-year-old "gypsy boy" plumbing apprentice from Christiania. Three others were identified as his accomplices.

The 1915 uprising did not end the school's strict disciplinarian methods which continued until 1953 when the Ministry of Social Affairs took over operations. The school was shut down on 1 October 1970.

== Prison ==
Bastøy Island, once infamous for its brutal reformatory, is now the site of the progressive Bastøy Prison, founded in 1982. Inmates must apply to serve their time on the island. Applications are denied if officials believe the prisoner poses a threat. There have been multiple escapes from the prison: one in 2015 when a man stole a surfboard and paddled to shore, and another in 2021. If caught escaping, inmates are sent to spend the rest of their time in higher-security prisons. At the prison, inmates live in cottages, dine on food cooked by a chef, and enjoy a sauna, tennis courts and horseback riding. The prison aims to rehabilitate the inmates currently residing there. The inmates live peacefully together, work well together and depend on each other for resources.

In 2014, the prison was awarded the 2014 Blanche Major Reconciliation Prize for "promoting human values and tolerance". Bastøy Prison has been called one of the most liberal prisons. Unlike most prisons throughout the world, the guards and inmates get along. At night, only 5 guards are left on the grounds to monitor the one hundred plus inmates. Inmates can experience a rough transition. Life for inmates in normal prisons is dictated for them every second of the day; however, at Bastøy, the prisoners have to learn how to fill their days with activities. Social scientists have claimed this can result in additional, unusual stressors not found in more traditional high-security prisons.

== In popular culture ==
The prison colony was featured in the DVD extras for Michael Moore's 2007 documentary Sicko. In 2010, both a documentary about the island by Michel Kapteijns was released and King of Devil's Island, a Norwegian film directed by Marius Holst. In 2015, the prison was featured in an episode of Good Mythical Morning. In 2015, the prison was again featured in Michael Moore's documentary Where to Invade Next.

== See also ==
- Halden Prison
- Incarceration in Norway
