= Cecilie Mosli =

Norwegian actress and film director (born 1973)

- Born: Cecilie Askeland Mosli; 30 January 1973 (age 53); Malangen, Norway
- Education: Kongsbakken Upper Secondary School
- Occupations: Actor and film director
- Children: 2 daughters

Cecilie Askeland Mosli (born 30 January 1973) is a Norwegian actress and film director. She is well-known for Mammon (2014) TV series, What Happened to Monday (2017) film and The Orheim Company (2012) TV series.

== Early life ==
She attended Kongsbakken High School in Tromsø, but transferred to a high school in Denmark. Afterwards, she and seven classmates began studying at the State Theatre College.

== Career ==
Her acting career began in the 1990s when she starred in several short films, including a small role in the film Elling. Her most well-known film role came in 2005 when she starred in Pål Sletaune's thriller Naboer. In 2006, she joined the cast for Thomas Kaisers's romantic comedy Miracle, along with Christian Skolmen and Swedish actress Eva Röse.

In 2009, she began acting for the television series ORPS and its movie sequel ORPS - The Movie. In 2010, she participated in the film Kurt Josef Wagle and the Legend of the Fjord Witch. Then, in 2012, she played the mother of Jarle Klepp in the film adaptation of Tore Renberg's novel Kompani Orheim.

In addition to film roles, Mosli was featured on the radio, worked as a voice actor and as a director. She performed roles in the program Hallo week, and voiced the rude boathouse in the children's television series Elias. She directed the NRK drama series Mammon in 2013. In 2017 she directed the fifth episode of season fourteen of Grey's Anatomy. She directed and acted in two episodes of Kielergata (2018).

== Filmography ==
Cecilie Mosli has directed 9 TV shows and acted in many others.

- Kaptein Sabeltann og Pinky (2011)
- Mammon (2014–2016)
- Acquitted (2016)
- Grey’s Anatomy (2017–2018)
- Home Ground (2018)
- Medgangssupportare (2018)
- Kieler Street (2018)
- Thin Ice (2020)
- The Fortress (2023)
