= Villmark Asylum =

- Directed by: Pål Øie
- Written by: Kjersti Helen Rasmussen; Pål Øie
- Starring: Ellen Dorrit Petersen; Renate Reinsve; Anders Baasmo; Tomas Norström; Baard Owe; Mads Sjøgård Pettersen
- Cinematography: Sjur Aarthun
- Music by: Trond Bjerknes; Roy Westad
- Release date: 9 October 2015
- Running time: 94 minutes
- Country: Norway
- Language: Norwegian

Villmark Asylum (Norwegian: Villmark 2) is a Norwegian horror movie released in 2015. The movie was released to an American audience through Amazon Prime in 2018.

== Plot ==
An abandoned sanatorium is decaying in a remote forest in the mountains, where an older janitor makes sure that people or animals do not enter the dangerous building. Five contract workers have taken the job of cleansing the massive building from toxins before it is to be demolished. They have to go through over 300 rooms and several kilometres of pipelines in three days. Water starts flooding out of the old pipes making their work more difficult, and an attempt to close the water leads them down to a dark basement labyrinth.

== Cast ==
- Ellen Dorrit Petersen as Live
- Renate Reinsve as Synne
- Anders Baasmo as Ole
- Tomas Norström as Frank
- Baard Owe as Karl
- Mads Sjøgård Pettersen as Even

== Production ==
The movie is a standalone sequel to Dark Woods (Villmark in Norwegian) from 2003, with a different cast and separate story.

The film was set in the former Lyster Sanatorium or Harastølen. The director Pål Øie was inspired to create the film by reading about plans to demolish the defunct sanatorium.

A mobile game based on the film, titled Villmark Sanatoriet, was developed by TurboTape Games.

== Reception ==
May Synnøve Rogne of Aftenposten describes the movie as an "effective nightmare", stating that while not necessarily adding to the horror genre, the movie succeeds in its most important point, to be at times "really scary". Jon Selås of Verdens Gang also gave the movie a good review, praising its actors and form of the horror genre. Aksel Kielland in Dagbladet said the film was "visually intelligent but far less smart in terms of plot and theme".
