= Svein and the Rat =

- Directed by: Magnus Martens (uncredited)
- Screenplay by: Kristin Skogereid
- Based on: Svein og rotta by Marit Nicolaysen
- Starring: Thomas Saraby Vatle; Luis Enge Poulsen; Celine Engebrigtsen
- Production company: Maipo Film
- Release date: March 3, 2006 (Norway)
- Running time: 72 minutes
- Country: Norway
- Language: Norwegian

Svein and the Rat (Svein og rotta) is a 2006 Norwegian family film, based on a book with the same name by Marit Nicolaysen. It was directed by Magnus Martens, but he was not satisfied with how it was edited, and decided to remove his credit as a director. There is a 2007 sequel called Svein and the rat and the UFO-mystery (Svein og Rotta og UFO-mysteriet).

== Plot ==
Svein (Thomas Saraby Vatle) is a small boy with a pet rat, Halvorsen. His friend Dan has also one, James Bond. To Svein's regret many people consider rats to be a pest. After Halvorsen has knawed on too many electric cables and a water hose of the washing machine, Svein's parents decide Svein cannot keep it, and they bring it to the pet shop. Dan tries to buy him back for Sven, but the shopkeeper tells him that pets are not sold to minors. By threatening to expose fraudulous behavior of the shopkeeper (who sold an unsuitable animal as guide dog to a blind man) Dan gets Halvorsen. He can stay now with him.

There is an upcoming pet competition in town. Svein assumes that rats cannot participate, and is afraid to ask, but his friend Melissa inquires; it turns out that rats are accepted; she registers Halvorsen. With Melissa's help Svein trains him to do tricks, but Halvorsen fails in the first attempt in the competition. Svein realizes that Halvorsen does not like to do tricks, and promises him that he never has to do them again.. Svein is allowed to let the rat try again, but he declines. However, Halvorsen wins the title "pet of the year" for his friendship with Svein. Later Svein gives Melissa her own rat.
