= Rolf Kristian Larsen =

Norwegian actor

- Born: Rolf Kristian Larsen; 18 May 1983 (age 43); Stavanger, Norway
- Occupation: Actor

Rolf Kristian Larsen (born 18 May 1983) is an actor from Stavanger, Norway.

He portrayed the character "Morten-Tobias" in the Norwegian film Fritt Vilt (English title "Cold Prey") in 2006. He also starred in the film Mannen som elsket Yngve ("The Man Who Loved Yngve"), released in February 2008. This film is based on a novel of the same name by the Stavanger author Tore Renberg, and Larsen starred as "Jarle Klepp", his first leading role.

In 2008 he was nominated for the Amanda for best acting, for his role in The Man Who Loved Yngve. He reprised his role as Jarle Klepp in the 2011 film I Travel Alone and the 2012 film The Orheim Company. In the 2015 TV mini-series The Heavy Water War he portrays World War II resistance fighter Einar Skinnarland.
