= Jan Grue =

Norwegian writer, academic and actor

- Born: 28 March 1981 (age 45); Oslo, Norway
- Education: Linguistics
- Occupations: Professor, writer
- Awards: Fritt Ord Award (2021)

Jan Grue (born 28 March 1981) is a Norwegian writer, academic and actor.

== Career ==
Born in Oslo on 28 March 1981, Grue graduated with a doctorate in linguistics in 2011. He was assigned to the University of Oslo from 2012, and a professor from 2016.

Grue has written books in several genres. His books include the short story collection Alt under Kontroll from 2010, followed by Ubestemt tid (2011) and Kropp og sinn (2012). Further books are the short story collection Normalia (2015), the novel Det blir ikke bedre (2016), Bortenfor, bortenfor, bortenfor (2017), and the short story collection Uromomenter (2019). He has written the children's books Oliver from 2011, Skadedyr (2015), and Super-Magnus (2016).

He was awarded the Norwegian Critics Prize for Literature for best non-fiction in 2018, for his book Jeg lever et liv som ligner deres. The book was also nominated for the Nordic Council's Literature Prize.

In 2019 Grue appeared in the Norwegian political thriller series Occupied.

He was awarded the P.O. Enquist Prize in 2021.

He received the Fritt Ord Award in 2021, shared with Bjørn Hatterud and Olaug Nilssen.

Awards
Preceded by Deeyah Khan	Recipient of the Fritt Ord Award shared with Bjørn Hatterud and Olaug Nilssen; 2021	Succeeded by Meduza
