= Aslaug Låstad Lygre =

Norwegian poet

Aslaug Låstad Lygre (12 December 1910 – 19 December 1966) was a Norwegian poet.

== Life ==
Lygre was born in Lindaas Municipality. When she finished her secondary education at Voss in 1932, she had already attended Fana Folk High School. In 1934 she finished commerce school in Bergen. She worked in the newspaper Gula Tidend from 1934 to 1935, and was a member of Vestmannalaget. From 1935 she had an office job, but worked part-time because of sub-par health. However, she also wrote both poems and articles in publications such as Gula Tidend, Bergens Tidende, Magne and Norsk barneblad.

Her first poetry collection was 1943's No blømer alle rosene ("Now All the Roses Bloom"). In her next collection, Eld av steinar ("Fire From Rocks", 1948) she coined the phrase Vi skal ikkje sova bort sumarnatta ("We shall not sleep away the summer night"), widely used today even out of its context. She wrote the poem while she was hospitalised with tuberculosis at Lyster Sanatorium. The poem was also given melody by Geirr Tveitt. Her next releases were Den einsame roaren (1952), Rit di rune (1957), Fest i september (1960) and Primulakveld (1964). In 1964 she won the Gyldendal's Endowment. She died on 20 December 1966 in Bergen. A monument to her was erected in Lindås in 1982.
