= Marit Nicolaysen =

Norwegian writer

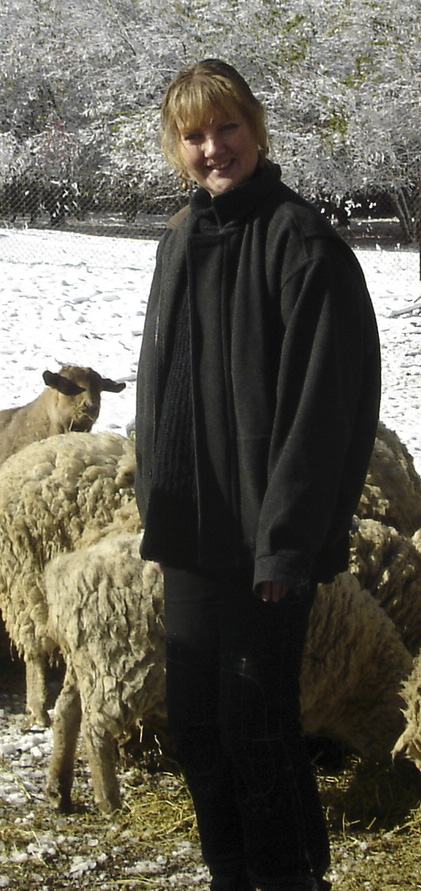
- Nicolaysen in 2004
- Born: 22 November 1953 (age 72); Oslo, Norway
- Occupations: novelist, short story writer and children's writer

Marit Nicolaysen (born 22 November 1953) is a Norwegian novelist, short story writer and children's writer.

She was born in Oslo. She made her literary debut in 1985 with the novel I Frøyas tegn, where the protagonist "Sol" is a traveller who asks herself how Freyja in Norse mythology could be a goddess for both war and love. She published the short story collection Tango med tiden in 1989. Slusk (1993) and Himmelsnørr og kjærlighet (1995) are books for young adults. She has written a number of children's books in the series Svein og rotta ("Svein and the rat"), illustrated by Per Dybvig, starting with Kloakkturen med Svein og rotta in 1996. The series has been among the best selling books for children and young adults in Norway. The 2006 family film Svein and the Rat is based on her novel.

== Selected works ==
- I Frøyas tegn (1985, novel)
- Tango med tiden (1989, short story collection)
- Slusk (1993, for young adults)
- Himmelsnørr og kjærlighet (1995, for young adults)
- Kloakkturen med Svein og rotta (1996, children's book)
- Svein og rotta på feriekoloni
- Svein og rotta i Syden
- Svein og Rotta på hospitalet
- Svein og rotta går for gull
- Svein og rotta på rafting
- Svein og rotta gjennom solsystemet (2002, children's book)
- Svein og rotta og det store gavekaoset
- Svein og rotta på hesteryggen
- Svein og rotta på dragrace (2005, children's book)
- Svein og rotta på lab'en (2006, children's book)
- Svein og rotta feirer jul på landet (2007, children's book)
- Svein og rotta og verdensmesterskapet (2008, children's book)
- Svein og rotta og kloningen (2009, children's book)
- Svein og rotta og monstertanna
