= Forus Upper Secondary School =

School in Sandnes, Norway

Coordinates: 58°53′00″N 5°44′21″E

Forus Upper Secondary School (Norwegian: Forus Videregående Skole) was an upper secondary school in Sandnes, Norway. It offered vocational studies, focused mainly on fine arts, and media and communication (photography, graphic design, video, computers etc.). It was the only upper secondary school in Norway to only offer artistic, visual and creative studies. About 330 students attended the school.

In 2010 the school merged with parts of Lundehaugen Upper Secondary School and formed a new school called Vågen. In addition to existing studies, the music, dance and drama studies from Lundehaugen Upper Secondary School was moved to this new school. The new school is located in the town's cultural center, close to the cinema, museum, library and the town hall.
