= War Sailor =

2022 film by Gunnar Vikene

- Film poster
- Norwegian: Krigsseileren
- Directed by: Gunnar Vikene
- Written by: Gunnar Vikene
- Produced by: Maria Ekerhovd
- Starring: Kristoffer Joner; Pål Sverre Hagen; Ine Marie Wilmann
- Cinematography: Sturla Brandth Grøvlen
- Edited by: Peter Brandt; Anders Albjerg Kristiansen
- Music by: Volker Bertelmann
- Production companies: Falkun Films, Malta; Mer Film; Rohfilm Factory and Studio Hamburg
- Release dates: 24 August 2022 (Norwegian International Film Festival); 9 September 2022 (Canada); 2 October 2022 (Germany)
- Running time: 150 minutes
- Countries: Norway; Germany; Malta
- Language: Norwegian
- Budget: $11.1m

War Sailor (Norwegian: Krigsseileren) is a 2022 Norwegian war drama film directed by Gunnar Vikene. It is the most expensive Norwegian film ever made.

Based on the true stories of the 30,000 Norwegian civilian sailors who participated in the Allied convoys during the Second World War, it follows two best friends from Bergen, one married (Alfred Garnes) and the other unmarried (Sigbjørn), who, in 1939, join the Norwegian merchant marine and are forced to stay at sea for the duration of the war without any ability to communicate with their families in occupied Norway. In the meantime, the married sailor's wife Cecilia and their three children endure a harsh life in occupied Bergen, which is also bombed by the Allies.

== Synopsis ==
In 1939, two Bergen dock workers Alfred (Freddy) and Sigbjørn embark on a several month mission on a cargo ship bound for New York. Alfred is reluctant to leave his family but is in desperate need of a job. As World War II erupts, the Norwegian merchant navy is commandeered by the Allies and the crew soon witnesses the horrors of war. In the midst of a German attack on their convoy, they cannot stop to help drowning mariners. Freddy manages to save three of them, including a teenager whom he promises to take care of. A few months later, in Malta, they take cover in a bomb shelter. Later in New York, they try to jump ship but are unable to do so because of police patrols.

Eventually, their ship is sunk by a German submarine and most of the crew is killed. The German U-Boot crew cannot take them as prisoners and leaves them with shots of morphine for the dying teenager and a meager amount of food. Alfred and Sigbjørn are left adrift until being rescued by an allied ship and taken to a hospital in Halifax, Canada. Upon learning that his entire family was killed by a British airstrike, Alfred leaves the hospital without notice. Sigbjørn returns after the war to Alfred's family, who escaped the bombing, but were told that he was killed at sea. Cecilia and Sigbjørn get together for a while, finding a sense of family after the harshness of the war.

A few years later, Sigbjørn finds an alcoholic and diminished Alfred in Singapore and gives him money to get back to Norway, telling him that his family is still alive. Upon returning home, Alfred has trouble re-adapting into Norwegian society and struggles to be accepted by his youngest son.

In 1972, for Alfred's 70 years birthday, his old friend Sigbjørn who has spent the rest of his life as a sailor, pays him a visit.

== Production ==
The film stars Kristoffer Joner, Pål Sverre Hagen and Ine Marie Wilmann. It was Norway's entry for Best International Feature at the 95th Academy Awards.

War Sailor is a co-production of Rohfilm Factory and Studio Hamburg, Germany, and Falkun Films, Malta. It is the most expensive Norwegian feature film, with a budget of $11 million.

== Netflix miniseries ==
On 2 April 2023, the film was released on Netflix in the form of a three-part miniseries with an additional 30 minutes of runtime.

== See also ==
- The Norwegian Shipping and Trade Mission (Nortraship)
