= Turn Me On, Dammit! =

2011 Norwegian film by Jannicke Systad Jacobsen

- Directed by: Jannicke Systad Jacobsen
- Written by: Jannicke Systad Jacobsen
- Based on: Få meg på, for faen by Olaug Nilssen
- Produced by: Brede Hovland
- Starring: Helene Bergsholm; Malin Bjørhovde; Beate Støfring; Matias Myren; Julia Schacht; Arthur Berning
- Cinematography: Marianne Bakke
- Edited by: Zaklina Stojcevska
- Music by: Ginge Anvik
- Production company: Motlys
- Release date: 19 August 2011
- Running time: 76 minutes
- Country: Norway
- Language: Norwegian (mainly Sunnfjord dialect)
- Box office: $126,085

Turn Me On, Dammit! (Norwegian: Få meg på, for faen!) or Turn Me On, Goddammit! is a 2011 Norwegian coming-of-age teen romantic comedy film directed by Jannicke Systad Jacobsen. It is based on Olaug Nilssen’s novel of the same name. Set in Skoddeheimen, a fictional small town in western Norway, the film is about Alma (Helene Bergsholm), a 15-year-old girl and her sexual awakening.

== Plot ==
In the small town of Skoddeheimen, Norway, Alma is a 15-year-old girl experiencing her sexual awakening. Unbeknownst to her mother, she regularly calls hotlines for phone sex, and masturbates while fantasizing about Artur, a boy from school. One night, Alma attends a party with her friends. While outside, Artur approaches her, exposes his erect penis, and pokes her with it. Thrilled, she retreats to a room to masturbate, and then rejoins her friends to tell them about the episode. They react with skepticism, and Artur obliquely denies the allegation. Alma becomes ostracized for slander, and is bullied with the nickname "Dick Alma".

Upon receiving her telephone bill, Alma's mother discovers enormous expenses and immediately confronts Alma about calling a pay number. Alma straightforwardly says it is phone sex, and that she patronizes it because of her hypersexuality. However, Alma promises she will pay for it, and takes a part-time job at a convenience store. There, she gets into trouble for stealing a pornographic magazine, which the owner contacts her mother about. Her mother replies she sees Alma as abnormal. Overwhelmed by the bullying at school, Alma briefly runs away, but her mother eventually welcomes her back home.

Alma confronts Artur, who confesses he poked her with his penis, and she did not simply imagine the incident, but denies sexual attraction to her. He decides to make things right with Alma, publicly confirming allegations he poked her with his penis. He also expresses romantic interest. She introduces Artur to her mother, and they have dinner together. However, Alma's mother, having been informed by a neighbour of the ostracization and misery Arthur caused Alma, refuses to let him sleep over, ending the film in a cliffhanger.

== Cast ==
- Helene Bergsholm as Alma
- Malin Bjørhovde as Sara
- Beate Støfring as Ingrid
- Matias Myren as Artur
- Lars Nordtveit Listau as Kjartan
- Henriette Steenstrup as Alma's mother
- Jon Bleiklie Devik as Sebjørn
- Julia Bache-Wiig as Maria
- Finn Tokvam as Math teacher
- Per Kjerstad as Stig (voice)
- Julia Schacht as Elisabeth (as Julia Elise Schacht)
- Arthur Berning as Terje

== Production ==
Director Jannicke Systad Jacobsen said the novel was popular in Norway, and that she "related to it in a kind philosophical and artistic way". Jacobsen said she admired how the story captured the teenage experience, in how minor incidents became major. Much of the casting took place in a town reminiscent of the one in the story, requiring acting lessons for the young actors. Many of them saw the screenplay only shortly before shooting, avoiding a highly practiced approach.

== Release ==
The film was featured in the Tribeca Film Festival, Zurich Film Festival and Stockholm International Film Festival. It had a wider opening in Norway in August 2011, performing well in the national box office.

In the U.S., it opened in New York City on 30 March 2012. It was released on DVD and Blu-ray in the U.K. in 2013, with a 15 rating.

== Reception ==
Based on 39 reviews collected by Rotten Tomatoes, the film holds a 92% approval rating and an average score of 7.4 out of 10. The New York Times critic Jeannette Catsoulis found an "affectionately deadpan tone" in the film. For The Globe and Mail, Alexandra Molotkow gave it three stars, writing it was unusual as a coming-of-age film for focusing on a young woman. Jordan Mintzer, writing for The Hollywood Reporter, positively reviewed the film for its heart, comedy and performances. Ben Walsh of The Independent called it "droll and refreshingly honest".

Jacobsen won the Screenplay award at the 2011 Tribeca Film Festival. Turn Me On, Dammit! also won 2012 Amanda Awards for Best Norwegian Film in Theatrical Release and Best Cinematography.
