= Samsaya =

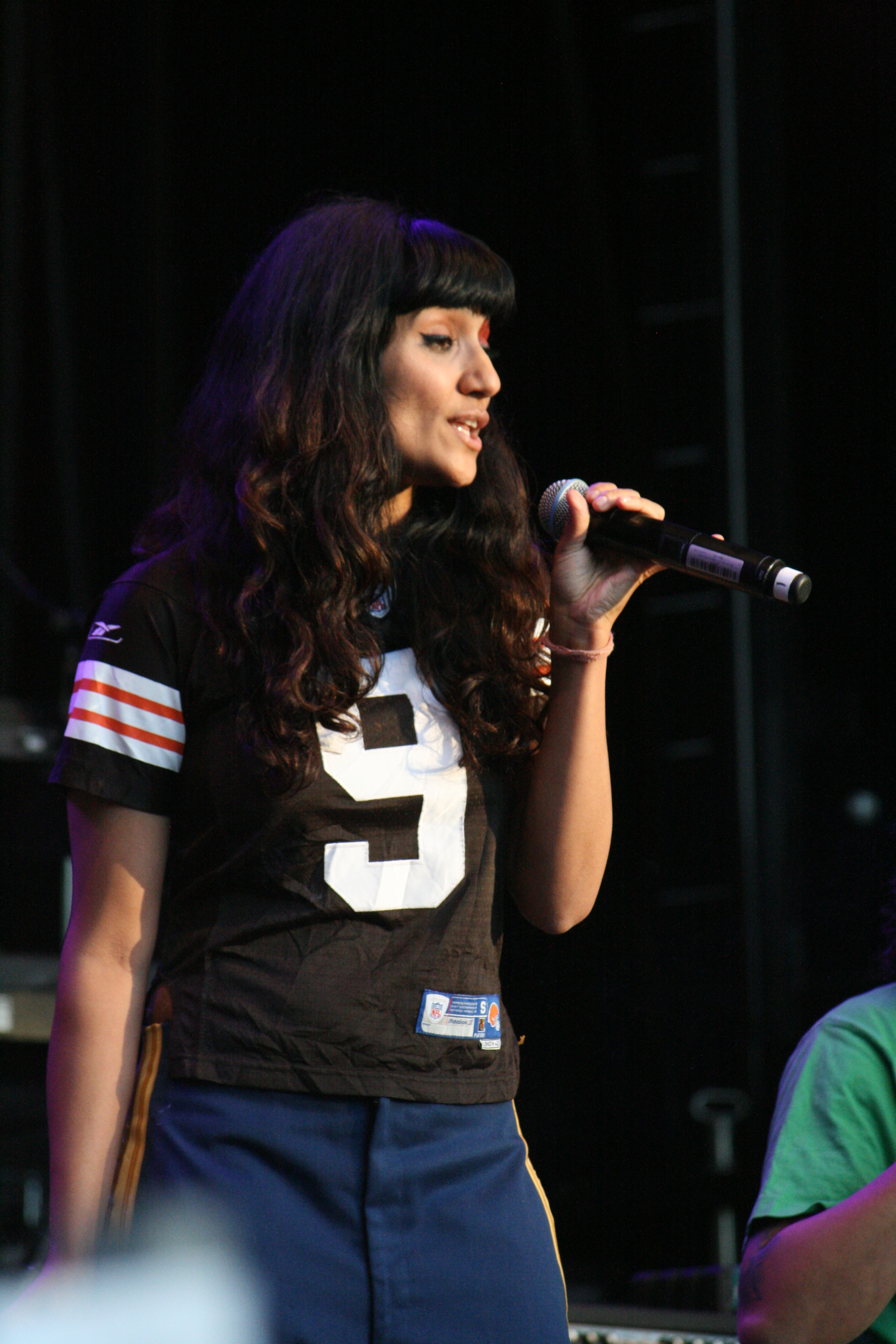
- Photo: Jarle Vines.

Background information
- Born: Sampda Sharma; 3 November 1979 (age 46); Hamirpur, Himachal Pradesh, India
- Origin: Ellingsrud, Oslo, Norway
- Genres: Pop, dance-pop, R&B
- Instrument: Vocals
- Years active: 2004–present
- Website: www.samsaya.com

Sampda Sharma (born 1979), better known by her stage name Samsaya, is a Norwegian singer and actress.

== Background ==
Samsaya was born Sampda Sharma in Hamirpur to a Norwegian father and an Indian mother, Aruna Sharma, in the northern Indian state of Himachal Pradesh. She lived in India with her family and moved to Norway at the age of only eleven months. She grew up on Ellingsrud in Oslo and went to Ellingsrudåsen skole and played football.

Growing up she was influenced by hip-hop and listened to Public Enemy. She appeared with her first band at the age of nineteen. After several years of making music with other urban musicians in Oslo, she got her breakthrough as an actress in the Norwegian movies, Folk flest bor i Kina, the horror movie Villmark and Hawaii Oslo.

In 2020 she was one of the signatories of the "Call for Inclusive Feminism," a document which led to the establishment of the Initiative for Inclusive Feminism.

== Career ==
=== Music ===
In 2004 she released her debut album Shedding Skin. She also released a video of the hit track "Ever been had?". After touring Norway, she took a break, and a couple of years later she set off to New York City. After spending a year in New York, she launched her single "Special blend" by Prayon, in collaboration with Levi's Norway.

In 2008 she released a new single called "Change", produced by Andre Lindal and Geir Hvidsten, which went to second place on the Norwegian singles chart, VG-lista. She was then signed to Bonnier Amigo, the same record label as Madcon, Paperboys and Mira Craig.

Her track "Dodge it" (Eve Nelson/Samsaya) was used in the Oscar-nominated movie The Wrestler. In 2009 she released the two singles "Money" produced by Jarl Aanestad and co-produced by Andre Lindal and "ADHD" produced by Jarl Aanestad.

Samsaya released her single "Stereotype" from the upcoming album Bombay Calling, produced by Roc Nation-producer Fred Ball. She has also signed a worldwide deal with BMG Chrysalis.

In 2012 she collaborated with fellow Norwegian Bertine Zetlitz on the song and video "Electric Feet".

=== Movies and television ===
Samsaya has had several roles in Norwegian movies. She has also been on several Norwegian shows on television and radio. In 2008 Samsaya was a VJ on the program Topp 10 on the TV Music Channel The Voice TV Norway. The popular show was seen by Norwegian teenagers on weekdays.

In 2009, Samsaya has been on the front cover of magazines such as Henne and TV shows such as the Norwegian version of The Clash of the Choirs, 4-stjerners middag halv åtte on TV Norge and Zebra Grand Prix on TV2.

== Discography ==
=== Albums ===
- 2015: Bombay Calling
- 2004: Shedding skin

=== Singles ===
| 2015 | "Beginning at the End" | Single track |
| 2013 | "Stereotype" | Single track |
| 2012 | "Breaking Bad" | Single track |
| 2010 | "Good With the Bad" | Single track |
| 2009 | "ADHD (Love Me) / (Love Me Not)" ( Lindal / Steimler / Aanestad / Samsaya) | Single track |
| 2009 | "Money" (Lindal / Aanestad / Samsaya) | Single track |
| 2008 | "Change" (Lindal / Hvidsten, Nelson & Samsaya) | Single track |
| 2007 | "Special Blend" (Prayon) | Released with Levi's Norway |
| 2003 | "Feel What I Feel" – Oslo Fluid feat. Samsaya | Single track |

=== Soundtrack ===
- 2008; "Dodge it" (Nelson / Samsaya) (Soundtrack from The Wrestler)

== Selected filmography ==
| Year | Title | Type | Character |
| 2008 | Varg Veum Begravde hinder | Film (Norwegian) | Alex |
| 2006 | Jul i Svingen | Barne-TV (Norwegian) | Dyrlege |
| 2005 | Hawaii, Oslo | Film (Norwegian) | |
| 2003 | Villmark | Film (Norwegian, Thriller) | Sara |
| 2002 | Folk flest bor i Kina | Film (Norwegian) | Gunn – Segment 'RV' |
