= Christmas Cruelty! =

- Original Norwegian release poster
- Norwegian: O'Hellige Jul!
- Directed by: Magne Steinsvoll; Per-Ingvar Tomren
- Written by: Eline Aasheim; Anita Nyhagen; Magne Steinsvoll; Per-Ingvar Tomren; Janne Iren Holseter
- Produced by: Kim Haldorsen; Raymond Volle; Magne Steinsvoll
- Starring: Tormod Lien; Eline Aasheim; Magne Steinsvoll; Per-Ingvar Tomren
- Cinematography: Raymond Volle
- Edited by: Per-Ingvar Tomren
- Music by: Magne Steinsvoll
- Production company: Stonewall Production
- Distributed by: DC Medias
- Release date: 13 December 2013 (Norway)
- Running time: 91 minutes
- Country: Norway
- Language: Norwegian

Christmas Cruelty! (Norwegian: O'Hellige Jul!, lit. O Holy Christmas!) is a 2013 Norwegian slasher film written and directed by Magne Steinsvoll and Per-Ingvar Tomren and co-written by Eline Aasheim, Anita Nyhagen and Janne Iren Holseter. Given a limited theatrical release in its home country, the film stars Steinsvoll, Tomren and Aasheim as Christmas revelers who find themselves being terrorized by a serial killer (Tormod Lien) dressed like Santa Claus.

== Plot ==
A man brutalizes a family whose home he has broken into, raping the mother in front of her bound and gagged loved ones before murdering all of them, starting with the baby, who he eviscerates with a circular saw. Elsewhere, three friends named Eline, Magne and Per-Ingvar celebrate the holiday season by making decorations, pulling pranks and getting drunk. The next day, while the trio recover from their hangovers, the killer, revealed to be a loving family man and a NAV employee, begins stalking them after stumbling onto Eline and Per-Ingvar's case files, at one point telling his wife, "I can't stop thinking about a poor girl and a guy in a wheelchair. They are going to have a horrible Christmas. I have to contribute in my own way, so they don't have to worry about the new year at least."

Per-Ingvar holds a small Christmas party at his apartment and unintentionally injures one of his guests, who Magne escorts to the hospital, accidentally leaving the door open on his way out. The killer, disguised as Santa Claus, barges in, fatally bludgeons one of the revelers, and sexually assaults Eline while Per-Ingvar is forced to watch. Before the killer can finish he is interrupted by a pair of late arrivals, one of whom he decapitates before incapacitating the other. Returning to Elise, the killer stabs her in the genitals and performs cunnilingus on her before he resumes raping her, knifing and smothering her when she begs him to stop. The killer cleans himself up afterward, makes dinner (which he eats while seated on Per-Ingvar) and spends the night at the apartment. In the morning, the killer uses Per-Ingvar's debit card to purchase a chainsaw, which he uses to dismember both Per-Ingvar and the remaining party guest. Answering a call from his daughter, the killer reassures her that he will be home soon as he writes "Merry Christmas" in blood on one of Per-Ingvar's walls.

== Cast ==
- Eline Aasheim as Inger Eline Aasheim
- Tormod Lien as Serial-Santa
- Magne Steinsvoll as Magne Steinsvoll
- Raymond Talberg as Boybandreka
- Per-Ingvar Tomren as Per-Ingvar Tomren
- Thomas Utgård as Thomas
- Solveig Sahr Bergheim as Solveig
- Tone Søyset Døving as Victim #1
- Jørgen Torp as Victim #2
- Eiric Lien as Victim #3
- Ranja Hjelvik as Victim #4
- Vilde Reiten Gommesen as Victim #5
- Irene Anita Holsether as Wife
- Nina-Shanett Arntsen as Daughter
- Olav Kåre Torjuul as Chainsaw Salesman
- Frans Hulsker as Christmas Tree Salesman

== Reception ==
While slightly critical of Christmas Cruelty!'s editing, Sean Leonard of Horror News still praised it as "a movie that is brutal and pulls no punches" and went on to write: "There is something special about the talent here, both in the fact that they made such a great movie for so little, but also that they made a movie that, while somewhat conforming to certain horror and slasher tropes, managed to still bring its fair share of originality to an often saturated market". Peek-A-Boo Magazine's Didier Becu awarded the film a score of 60/100 and concluded that, aside from a few technical limitations, it was "a brilliant ode to the slasher genre by two filmmakers with passion". UK Horror Scene's Steven Hickey similarly referred to Christmas Cruelty! as "a sick and sadistic Grindhouse flick for those who want horror to horrify" while Severed Cinema's Richard Taylor called it "an entertaining, but hard to watch film" that warranted a grade of 4/5. Katherine Webb of Screen Rant described the film as "disturbing" and "basically two hours of holly, jolly torture porn" and concluded: "In no way is Christmas Cruelty for the faint of heart, but it's about as gory as you can get for the holidays, and it certainly lives up to its name".
