= Hjelperytteren =

2019 film

- Directed by: Jannicke Systad Jacobsen
- Written by: Jannicke Systad Jacobsen
- Produced by: Isak Eymundsson; Fredrik Støbakk
- Starring: Silje Salomonsen; Espen Klouman Høiner; Agnes Kittelsen
- Cinematography: Nils Eilif Bremdal-Vinell
- Edited by: Jon Endre Mørk; Marta Sæverud
- Music by: Peder Kjellsby
- Release date: August 30, 2019
- Running time: 83 minutes
- Country: Norway
- Language: Norwegian

Hjelperytteren (English title: 110% Honest) is a Norwegian feature film from 2019 written and directed by Jannicke Systad Jacobsen. The film is a drama film–black comedy starring Silje Salomonsen as the former professional cyclist Kim Karlsen, who, several years after she quit, admits to having used EPO as a performance-enhancing drug during her successful career.

For his role in the film, Espen Klouman Høiner was nominated for the 2019 Kanon Award in the category best supporting actor.

== Plot ==
Former professional cyclist Kim Karlsen is now 39 years old, and she holds a press conference during which she admits the use of performance-enhancing substances during her career. This dark comedy takes viewers behind the scenes of a doping scandal as it begins to unfold, observing how Kim copes with her fall from popularity. However, instead of accepting the consequences of her actions, the protagonist insists that she did nothing wrong.

== Cast ==
- Silje Salomonsen as Kim Karlsen
- Espen Klouman Høiner as Peter
- Agnes Kittelsen as Grete Stein
- Kjersti Tveterås as Marie-Louise
- Nader Khademi as Dennis
- Henriette Steenstrup as Line
- Rachel Cohen as Nancy Legpower
- Helene Bergsholm as the translator
