= King of Devil's Island =

2010 French-Norwegian drama film

- English film poster.
- Directed by: Marius Holst
- Written by: Dennis Magnusson
- Produced by: Karin Julsrud
- Starring: Stellan Skarsgård; Benjamin Helstad; Kristoffer Joner
- Cinematography: John Andreas Andersen
- Edited by: Michal Leszczylowski
- Music by: Johan Söderqvist
- Production companies: 4 1/2 Fiksjon AS; Opus Film; St Paul Film; MACT Productions
- Distributed by: Euforia Film (Norway); Les Films du Losange (France)
- Release dates: 17 December 2010 (Norway); 23 November 2011 (France)
- Running time: 115 minutes
- Countries: Norway; Sweden; Poland; France
- Languages: Norwegian; Swedish
- Budget: 54 million kr ($6.4 million)

King of Devil's Island (French: Les Révoltés de l'île du Diable), (Norwegian: Kongen av Bastøy) is a 2010 drama film directed by Marius Holst. The film premiered in Norway on 17 December 2010 and was next shown at the international film festivals of Sweden (January 2011), Rotterdam (February 2011) and during the Lübeck Nordic Film Days 2011. The story is based on true events that occurred at Bastøy Prison in Norway.

Shooting for King of Devil's Island took place mostly in Estonia.

== Plot ==
At the Bastøy prison island for youths, the newest arrival, Erling "C19", soon becomes friends with Olav ("C1"). Under the rule of warden Håkon, Erling comes to terms with the harsh winter, the mistreatment by the staff, and the hated unit manager Bråthen. Olav sees Bråthen molesting "C5", Ivar, a timid, shy boy in the laundry room. When he raises this with the warden, the boys are severely punished and C5 is reassigned to duties far away from Bråthen. However, after hearing that Bråthen expects him to be back in the laundry room later, Ivar drowns himself in the freezing waters on the beach.

Bråthen is apparently fired, to the overwhelming delight of the other boys. Olav is paroled and is planning to leave, but on the way to the departing boat, walks past Bråthen, who had been sent away on a shopping trip until Olav, the only witness to Ivar's rape, had left the island. Olav and Erling attack Bråthen in a fit of rage and they are locked in freezing solitary confinement as punishment. They are freed by Bjarne, one of the few Bastøy boys who has remained on the island as a caretaker.

Olav again pursues Bråthen, and the attack inspires a mass uprising. The boys ransack the prison and drive the staff away. Bråthen is repeatedly hanged in a barn, released and then beaten severely. The barn is in is set ablaze, but Erling drags him to safety. A navy ship is brought in and violently puts down the uprising. Olav and Erling manage to escape across a frozen fjord back to the mainland, but Erling falls through a gap in the ice close to shore and quickly freezes to death. Olav is shown later, older, as a member of a ship's crew, watching as they pass Bastøy island.

== Cast ==
- Stellan Skarsgård as Håkon
- Benjamin Helstad as Erling "C19"
- Trond Nilssen as Olav "C1"
- Kristoffer Joner as Bråthen
- Ellen Dorrit Petersen as Astrid
- Magnus Langlete as Ivar "C5"

== Reception ==
On the review aggregator website Rotten Tomatoes, 94% of 48 critics' reviews are positive. The website's consensus reads: "Scandinavian in the most bleakly satisfying way, King of Devil's Island satisfies with a richly layered narrative and a typically strong performance from Stellan Skarsgard."

== Historical background ==
Although it is set in winter, the film is a fictionalized retelling of a rebellion among the youth at the Bastøy Reform School in May 1915. The reformatory was located on Bastøy Island in the Oslo fjord south of Horten municipality in the county of Vestfold in Norway. The Norwegian government purchased the island in 1898 for 95,000 kroner, and the reformatory opened in 1900.
