= Espen Klouman Høiner =

Norwegian writer and actor (born 1981)

- Born: 31 August 1981 (age 44); Nesodden, Akershus, Norway
- Occupation: Actor
- Years active: 2004–present

Espen Klouman Høiner (born 31 August 1981, in Nesodden, Akershus) is a Norwegian writer and actor. He graduated from Westerdals School of Communication and Norwegian National Academy of Theatre in Oslo. He first appeared in the teen drama Bare Bea (2004), but gained recognition as an aspiring writer in the Joachim Trier movie Reprise in 2006. He also played in Switch (2007) and Must Have Been Love (2013).

== Filmography ==
- 2004: Bare Bea
- 2006: Reprise
- 2007: Switch
- 2008: Uti vår hage (TV series)
- 2009: Upperdog
- 2013: Must Have Been Love
- 2015: The Heavy Water War (TV series)
- 2019: Hjelperytteren as Peter

== Awards ==
- Won the Kanon Award (2013) in the Best Actor category, for his role in It Must Have Been Love.
- Won the Hedda Award (2013) in the Best Supporting Actor category for his role as Biff Loman in the plays Death of a Salesman and Ivar Zolen in Bør Børson.
