= East End Angels =

- Directed by: Lars Berg
- Written by: Mette M. Bølstad; Vibeke Idsøe; Kjersti Ugelstad
- Starring: Emma Høgh Åslein; Nini Bakke Kristiansen; Helene Nybråten
- Release date: 26 February 2010
- Running time: 82 minutes
- Country: Norway
- Language: Norwegian

East End Angels (Norwegian: Asfaltenglene) is a 2010 Norwegian children's film directed by Lars Berg, starring Emma Høgh Åslein, Nini Bakke Kristiansen and Helene Nybråten. 12-year old Maja (Høgh Åslein), Rikke (Bakke Kristiansen) and Ohna (Nybråten) are planning on doing nothing all summer. Then Ohna's family gets framed for involvement in the drug trade, and the girls have to solve the mystery.
