= The Man Who Loved Yngve =

2008 Norwegian coming-of-age film

- Theatrical poster
- Directed by: Stian Kristiansen
- Written by: Tore Renberg
- Starring: Rolf Kristian Larsen; Arthur Berning; Ida Elise Broch; Ole Christoffer Ertvåg
- Cinematography: Trond Høines
- Edited by: Vidar Flataukan
- Music by: John Erik Kaada
- Release date: 15 February 2008 (Norway)
- Running time: 90 minutes
- Country: Norway
- Language: Norwegian

The Man Who Loved Yngve (Norwegian: Mannen som elsket Yngve) is a Norwegian film released on 15 February 2008. It is based on a book of the same name by Stavanger author Tore Renberg. It received critical acclaim, considered one of the best Norwegian films of the year.

A sequel, I Travel Alone, was released in 2011 and a threequel, The Orheim Company, followed in 2012.

== Plot ==
In 1989, in the shadow of the collapse of Communism in Europe, a group of young, rural Norwegians form a band. Preparations for their first gig are derailed when the lead singer, Jarle, is smitten by a new arrival, Yngve. Confused and not completely in touch with his own emotions, Jarle neglects his band, his family, and his girlfriend to spend more time with his new crush.

== Cast ==
- Rolf Kristian Larsen as Jarle Klepp
- Arthur Berning as Helge Ombo
- Ida Elise Broch as Katrine Halsnes
- Ole Christoffer Ertvaag as Yngve Lima
- Jørgen Langhelle as Terje Orheim
- Trine Wiggen as Sara Klepp

== Production details ==
- Production Company: Motlys A/S
- Producer: Yngve Sæther
- Writer: Tore Renberg
- Distributor: Sandrew Metronome
- Filming start date: 12.02.07
- Filming end date 30.03.07
- Director: Stian Kristiansen
- Music: Kaada and Geir Zahl
- Budget: 15.5 million NKR
