= Must Have Been Love =

- Film poster
- Norwegian: En som deg
- Finnish: Kaksi tarinaa rakkaudesta
- Directed by: Eirik Svensson
- Written by: Eirik Svensson; Jyrki Väisänen
- Cinematography: Martin Solvang
- Edited by: Karsten Meinich
- Music by: Verneri Pohjola
- Release dates: October 19, 2012 (Finland); February 1, 2013 (Norway)
- Running time: 85 minutes
- Countries: Norway, Finland
- Languages: English, Norwegian, Finnish
- Box office: 522,400 NOK

Must Have Been Love (Norwegian: En som deg, Finnish: Kaksi tarinaa rakkaudesta) is a 2012 Norwegian-Finnish romantic drama film directed by Eirik Svensson. The film was Svensson's directorial debut, and stars Pamela Tola and Espen Klouman Høiner. It was shot in Oslo, Helsinki, Istanbul and Berlin.

== Cast ==
- Pamela Tola as Kaisa
- Espen Klouman Høiner as Jacob / Andreas
- Mattis Herman Nyquist as August
- Audun Hjort as Audun
- Laura Birn as Anna
- Pihla Viitala as Helmi
