= Hevn (Revenge) =

- Directed by: Kjersti G. Steinsbø
- Screenplay by: Kjersti G. Steinsbø
- Based on: Dukken i taket by Ingvar Ambjørnsen
- Produced by: Kristine Knudsen, Paul Barkin, Mark Gingras, Lisa G. Black
- Starring: Siren Jørgensen; Frode Winther; Maria Bock; Anders Baasmo Christiansen; Trond Espen Seim
- Cinematography: Anna Myking
- Edited by: Jon Endre Mørk
- Music by: Michael White
- Production companies: Den siste skilling AS; Alcina Pictures
- Distributed by: Euforia Film AS
- Release dates: November 6, 2015 (Norway); May 27, 2016 (Canada)
- Running time: 104 minutes
- Countries: Norway; Canada
- Language: Norwegian

Hevn (Revenge) is a 2015 Norwegian-Canadian drama film directed by Kjersti G. Steinsbø.

== Cast ==
- Siren Jørgensen - Rebekka
- Frode Winther - Morten
- Maria Bock - Nina
- Anders Baasmo Christiansen - Bimbo
- Trond Espen Seim - Ivar
- Helene Bergsholm - Maya
- Rakel Hamre - Emma
- Kine Bortheim Jentoft - Sara

== Production ==
The Norwegian-language movie was shot in Fjærland, Norway with post-production in Toronto. The script is based on Ingvar Ambjørnsen's novel Dukken i taket (Doll in the Ceiling) and The Doll in the Ceiling was the film's original title when it started filming in September 2014. Another working title of the film was "The Good Sister". The crew of the film is largely female. A version of the film played as a "work in progress" at the Göteborg Film Festival in January 2015.

== Release ==
The film was released theatrically in Norway in November 2015. It was played in three festivals in 2016: in Göteborg Film Festival in February, the Beaune International Thriller Film Festival in March, and Night Visions in April.

== Reception ==
=== Critical response ===
On review aggregator Rotten Tomatoes, the film holds an approval rating of 71%, based on 7 reviews with an average rating of 6.6/10.

=== Awards ===
At the 2016 Amanda Awards, Maria Bock was named Best Actress in a Supporting Role for Hevn.

The film received a Canadian Screen Award nomination at the 5th Canadian Screen Awards, for Michael White in the category Best Original Score.

== See also ==
- In a Better World (Danish film with similar title)
