= Trond Nilssen =

Norwegian actor (born 1990)

- Born: 22 August 1990 (age 35); Norway
- Occupation: Actor
- Years active: 2010–present

Trond Nilssen (born 22 August 1990) is a Norwegian actor. He is best known for playing Olav/C-1 in Kongen av Bastøy which won him an Amanda Award for Best Actor in a Supporting Role.

== Film ==
Year	Title	Role	Notes	Source
2010	Kongen av Bastøy	Olav / C-1		
2011	Sons of Norway	Anton		
2012	All That Matters Is Past	Ruud at 18		
2014	Victor	Victor	Short film	
2016	Pyromanen	Dag		
2016	Like a Mirrored Pool		Short film	
2016	Vi kan ikke hjelpe alle	Boy	Short film	

== Awards and nominations ==
Year	Work	Award	Category	Result	Source
2011	Kongen av Bastøy	Amanda Award	Best Actor in a Supporting Role	Won	
