= Benjamin Helstad =

Norwegian actor and musician

Benjamin Helstad is a Norwegian actor and musician mostly known for King of Devil's Island, Body Troopers and Permafrost. He has also done the Norwegian dubbing for several American films, including Disney's Fillmore, Jungle Cubs and A Bug's Life. He portrayed Adam Solvang in Kielergata (2018).
