= Helene Bergsholm =

Norwegian actress (born 1992)

- Born: July 20, 1992 (age 33); Førde, Norway
- Occupation: Actress

Helene Naustdal Bergsholm (born July 20, 1992) is a Norwegian actress.

== Early life and education ==
Bergsholm was born in Førde, Norway. She attended Hafstad High School in Førde from 2008 to 2011, and in 2011 she was a student in the photography department at Jæren Folk High School. Later she received a bachelor's degree in art direction at Westerdals Oslo School of Arts, Communication and Technology. During her bachelor's degree, she attended a semester at the School of Visual Arts in New York. In June 2016, she enrolled at the Oslo National Academy of the Arts.

== Career ==
Bergsholm played the lead role in the youth film Turn Me On, Dammit!, based on Olaug Nilssen's novel Få meg på, for faen. For her role as Alma, in 2012 she was nominated for the Amanda Award for Best Female Lead, competing against Noomi Rapace. In 2013, during the William and Mary Global Film Fest in Virginia, Bergsholm won the Rising Young Talent award. In 2015, she had a role in the film Hevn, directed by Kjersti B. Steinsbø, based on Ingvar Ambjørnsen's novel Dukken i taket from 2001. Shortly after this, she also played the main role in the short film Vi kan ikke hjelpe alle, directed by Nina Knag and based on the short story of the same name by Ingvild H. Rishøi.

== Filmography ==
- 2011: Turn Me On, Dammit! as Alma
- 2015: Hevn as Maya
- 2016: Vi kan ikke hjelpe alle as Emma
- 2019: Hjelperytteren as the translator
