= Julia Schacht =

Norwegian actress (born 1982)

- Born: Julia Elise Schacht; 13 July 1982 (age 44); Helgøya, Hedmark
- Occupation: Actress
- Years active: 2005 – present

Julia Elise Schacht (born 13 July 1982) is a Norwegian actress, born on the island of Helgøya in the lake Mjøsa.

== Biography ==
Schacht was educated at Oslo National Academy of the Arts and Nordic Institute of Stage and Studio. She had her début in Pål Sletaune's 2005 thriller Next Door, which was only the second Norwegian movie ever to receive an over-18 rating. In 2005, Schacht was named "Norway's most sexy woman" by the men's magazine Mann. She also starred in Tommy Wirkola's horror comedy flick Kurt Josef Wagle and the Legend of the Fjord Witch.

== Select filmography ==
Year	Title	Role
2005	Naboer	Kim
2009	2023	Eva
2009	Svik	Lise
2010	Kurt Josef Wagle and the Legend of the Fjord Witch	
2011	Hjelp, vi er i filmbransjen!	Gina
2020, 2022	The Machinery	Nina Berge
2022	Fenris	Kathinka Belset
