= Jannicke Systad Jacobsen =

Norwegian film director (born 1975)

- Born: 1975 (age 50–51)
- Education: London international Film School; The National Film School of the Czech Republic; Oslo University
- Occupations: Film director; screenwriter

Jannicke Systad Jacobsen (born 1975) is a Norwegian screenwriter and film director.

== Early life ==
She was born in 1975 and grew up in Høvik, Norway.

She studied film directing at The National Film School of the Czech Republic, as well as social anthropology and theatre studies at the Oslo University. Jacobsen also studied at the London international Film School.

== Career ==
Systad Jacobsen has directed many documentaries. Systad Jacobsen has said that she thoroughly plans and write scripts for her documentaries, influenced by her study of fiction film. She has recently turned to features in order to control more of the process, but still keep the sensitivity of working with real people.

Turn Me On, Dammit! was Jacobsen's first fiction feature film. It had its world premiere in 2011 at New York’s Tribeca Film Festival, where it won an award for Best Screenplay. Jacobsen wrote the screenplay, based on a book by Olaug Nilssen. Systad Jacobsen chose to cast teenagers who had grown up in a small city in the movie, instead of city kids. These teenagers were not actors. Marianne Bakke, the cinematographer of the movie, was previously a still photographer.

Turn me on, dammit! introduces Alma, a teenage girl growing up in a small town in Norway, living with her mom, by a shot of her lying on the kitchen floor. Next to her on the kitchen floor lies a telephone from which the voice of a phone-sex operator comes. Alma talks with the voice while masturbating. Alma has a rich imagination, and the person taking up the biggest part of that imagination is Artur, her classmate and neighbor. At a party, Artur finally approaches her with what seems to be sexual intentions and Alma tells her friends about it, but they don’t believe her. Her peers, including her closest friends, refuse to talk to her and leave her out in the cold. The rumor spreads fast, and soon everyone has a mean nickname for her. While on the bus, passing the sign with the name of her hometown, Alma and her friend used to raise their middle-finger to it, to show their dislike. Alma is now left alone with her dislike of her hometown. The movie portrays young female sexuality with humor and with playfulness.

Klovnebarna ('The Clown Children') is a documentary about two young boys who make money by dressing up as clowns and showing tricks for people in the cars at a crossing in Guatemala City. Systad Jacobsen wrote the script for it, as well as directed it.

Sandmann – Historien om en sosialistisk supermann ('Sandman – the Story of a Socialist Superman') is a documentary directed by Systad Jacobsen about the Sandman, a character from a television show for children in Germany, Sandmännchen. It reflects upon the ideology and history of socialism. The documentary participated in the Norwegian Documentary Film Festival Volda (2005), the Norwegian Short Film Festival Grimstad (2005), the Uppsala Int'l Short Film Festival (2005), the M-DOX Malmö, Sweden (2005), the Grenzland Filmtage (2006), and the Kristiansand International Children's Film Festival (2006).

Kampen mot paranoia ('The War of Paranoia') is a short film directed by Systad Jacobsen, released in August 2003. It reflects upon the actions of the American Embassy in Oslo that took place after the September 11 attacks. It participated in many film festivals, such as the Political Incorrect Film Festival in Ljubliana, the World Wide Short Film Festival in Toronto (2004), and the Festival on Wheels in Turkey.

Frimerket og fyret is a documentary portraying the infrastructure in Norway, released in 2002. Systad Jacobsen wrote the manuscript, directed it and produced it. It was screened in several festivals internationally, such as the Festival Cinema Delle Donne (Italy, 2003), the International Documentary Film Festival Munchen (Germany, 2003), the Jihlava International Documentary Film Festival (Czech Republic, 2003), and the Message to Man (Russia, 2003).

== Filmography ==
- 2001: En liten rød prikk (short)
- 2002: Frimerket og fyret (documentary short)
- 2003: Kampen mot paranoia (short)
- 2005: The Clown Children (documentary short)
- 2005: Sandmann – Historien om en sosialistisk supermann (TV documentary)
- 2007: Pizzaeventyret (TV series documentary)
- 2008: Scenes from a friendship (documentary)
- 2011: Turn Me On, Dammit!
- 2019: Hjelperytteren

== Accolades ==
Turn me on, dammit! won the award for Best Screenplay in the world at New York's Tribeca Film Festival. The movie had six nominations for Amandaprisen in the following categories: Best Norwegian Film, Best Actress, Best Supporting Actress, Best Screenplay, Best Cinematography and Best Music.

Sandman – the Story of a Socialist Superman was nominated for Gullrutten in 2006, in the category for Best TV Documentary.

The Clown Children (Klovnebarna) won the Kodak Shot-on-film award at Durango Film, an independent film festival, in 2008.
