= Pyromaniac (film) =

2016 film

- Directed by: Erik Skjoldbjærg
- Written by: Bjørn Olaf Johannessen
- Starring: Trond Nilssen
- Release date: 22 April 2016
- Running time: 98 minutes
- Country: Norway
- Language: Norwegian

Pyromaniac (Norwegian: Pyromanen) is a 2016 Norwegian drama film directed by Erik Skjoldbjærg. It was selected to be screened in the Contemporary World Cinema section at the 2016 Toronto International Film Festival.

== Cast ==
- Per Frisch as Ingemann
- Agnes Kittelsen as Elsa
- Trond Nilssen as Dag
- Liv Bernhoft Osa as Alma
- Henrik Rafaelsen as Lensmann Johansen
