= See You Tomorrow (novel) =

2013 novel by Tore Renberg

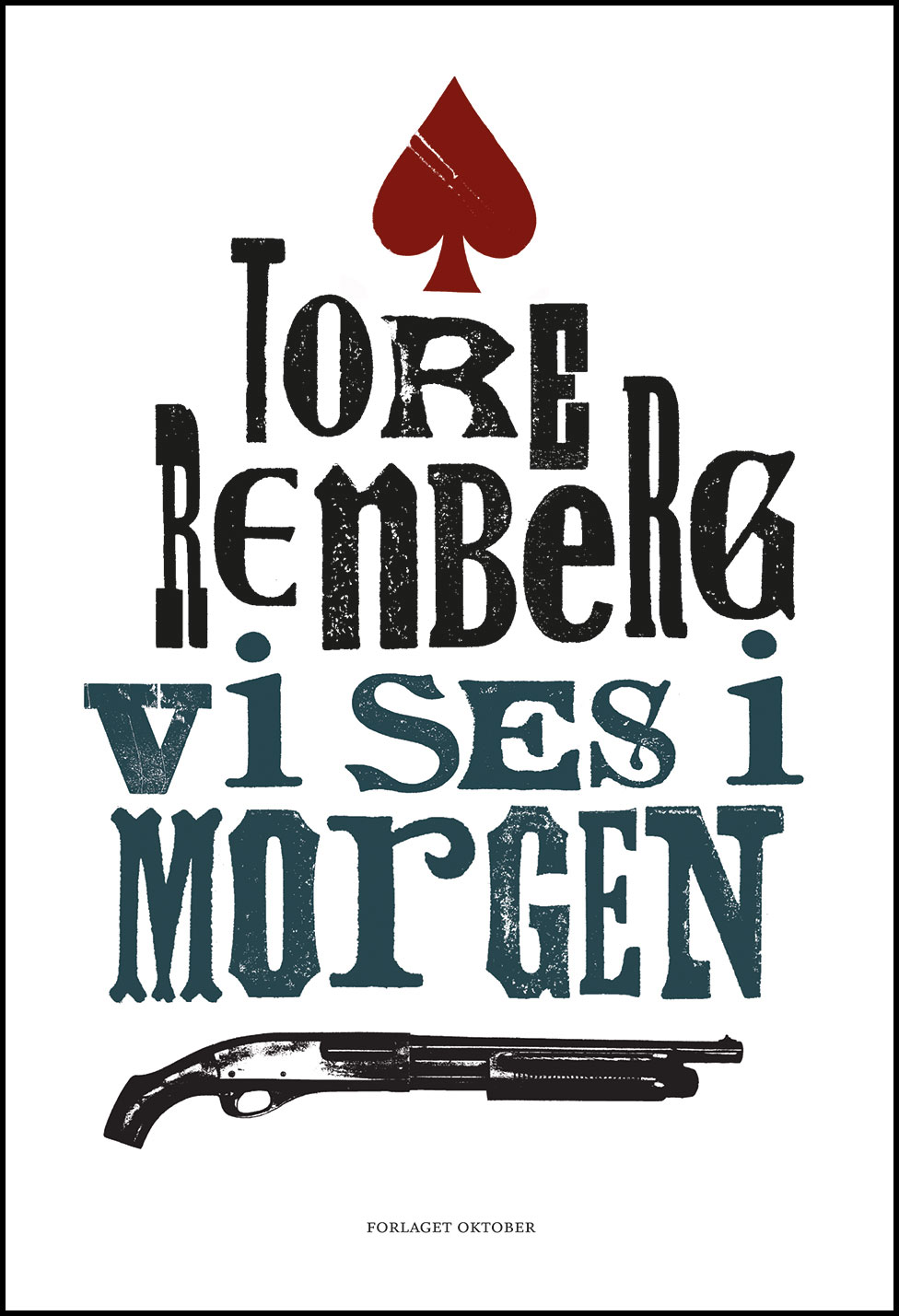
- Cover design: Asbjørn Jensen
- Author: Tore Renberg
- Language: Norwegian
- Publisher: Forlaget Oktober
- Publication place: Norway

See You Tomorrow is a neo-noir novel by Norwegian author Tore Renberg. It was released in Norway in September 2013 and in the UK in August 2014. See You Tomorrow is the first novel in the Teksas-series.

== Plot summary ==
See You Tomorrow is set in Stavanger, the author's hometown and surroundings which he uses for his literary exploration of the human condition. The novel is told through 11 narrators, characters belonging to highly different worlds within the same city – a group of adolescents at a high school and the bewildered and desperate father of two of them, and a gang of petty criminals trying to cope with the changing times. All of them are in search of something, trying to fill the holes in their lives.

== History ==
In the autumn of 2013, a new chapter began in Tore Renberg’s career. Renberg was known for his five novels spanning the young life and adulthood of Jarle Klepp (The Man Who Loved Yngve, The Orheim Company, Charlotte Isabel Hansen / I Travel Alone, Pixley Mapogo, These Are My Old Days) - a literary character resembling, to a certain extent, the author himself. However, Renberg was eager to challenge himself and take his literature a step further, moving away from autobiography and wholly embracing fiction and imaginative storytelling. The result was the novel See You Tomorrow. It was an immediate success, receiving rave reviews from the Norwegian critics and reprinted twice that same autumn. The second novel in the Teksas-series, Attack From All Sides, followed a year after and was also very well received. See You Tomorrow has also been published in Denmark and Sweden and the rights have been sold to a total of eight countries.

== Narration and literary technique ==
See You Tomorrow is told in the present tense, and chronologically. It spans over 6 days the autumn of 2012, and consists of four parts, the first called ”Tuesday 25 September”, the second ”Wednesday 26 September”, the third ”Thursday 27 September”, and the fourth ”Sunday 30 September”. Like many books by Renberg, it uses epigraphs, this time one for every part: A quotation from Nick Cave, Motörhead and the Proverbs.

The most important narrative trait of the novel is its multivocality. Renberg has named William Faulkner´s As I Lay Dying (1930) one of the key influences to the literary style and technique of See You Tomorrow. Faulkner's novel tells the story of a collective, namely the Bundren family and their associates, as they fulfil the late Addie Bundren's wish to be buried in the town of Jefferson. In this eponymous novel Faulkner uses multiple narrators, varying chapter lengths and modes. As I Lay Dying presents itself through 15 different points of view over 59 chapters, titled by their narrators´names. The major difference between As I Lay Dying and See You Tomorrow in terms of narration and style, lies in the fact that Renberg does not use first person narration, monologue or strict stream of consciousness. See You Tomorrow is told through 11 narrators, in the third person, but using a very intimate narrative tone, to the extent that the reader almost feels like it is a first person in disguise. The chapters are named with titles, blending a feel of the classic 19th century novel of Dickens or Balzac, with the modern rock album and American grit/pulp. Tore Renberg has several times stated music as a significant influence for his work, and more than ever with See You Tomorrow (Significance of music in See You Tomorrow). Among the 11 voices in See You Tomorrow there is no clear protagonist, but it could be argued that the centre of the novel is the petty criminal gang-leader Jan Inge Haraldsen, who stands as a sort of baroque chief in this universe, both literary and in terms of content.

== The characters ==
See You Tomorrow has a wide range of characters, ranging from baroque criminals, a prostitute, a public employee and a group of young adults. 11 of them are point of view-narrators in the novel.

Cecilie Haraldsen (born 1972). Petty criminal woman about to turn forty, nicknamed “Chessi”. She lives in a run-down house by the fjord just outside the town centre of Stavanger together with her brother and her boyfriend. She has “hips like shelves” and is described as “born difficult” and “downright spiny”, “pale and freckly”, and unexpectedly sexy. She loves cinnamon buns, power ballads, first and foremost by Aerosmith, and cigarettes. As the novel progresses, the reader learns that Cecilie is pregnant, but that she does not know who the father is: her boyfriend Rudi, or Tong, the inmate she's been visiting in prison. As a young teenager she was being presented to the friends of her brother's as a gift in return for their criminal favors, thus becoming an in-house prostitute. One of these early guests was her now boyfriend, Rudi. This story is to be found in the pre-See You Tomorrow short novel, The Video Boy (2006). Cecilie holds 11 chapters in See You Tomorrow.

Rudi (born 1970). Cecilie's boyfriend, also a petty criminal. Rudi's real name is Rune Digervold. He is a major fan of classic heavy metal like AC/DC and Motörhead, he has ADD/ADHD and he considers speech golden and silence overrated. Rudi calls himself “the Baron of Love” and is devoted to Cecilie in a very persistent way. A comic and a tragic figure, a very Renbergian portrait of a masculine and limitless man, echoing other such figures in his authorship, for instance Helge Ombo in the Jarle Klepp-series. For the romantic couple Cecilie and Rudi, Renberg has stated that Lula and Sailor in Barry Gifford´s Wild at Heart as a major influence, as well as David Lynch´s 1990 adaptation of the same novel. Rudi holds 13 chaptes in See You Tomorrow.

Jan Inge Haraldsen (born 1969). The leader and the hoodlum mastermind of the Hillevåg-Gang and Cecilie's older brother. Jan Inge started his criminal career in his teens, lending his sister out “like a VHS” (Rudi) in return for favors. From this gritty background in the eighties he built his trash-Tony Soprano world of torpedo jobs and petty crime. Jan Inge has been fascinated by horror movies since he was young. He considers them great works of ethic, and holds them alongside the Bible in telling the truth. He has plans of one day writing a book called “It´s too late – a study of horror movies”. Jan Inge, now 120 kilos and lonely, also reckons himself a modern-day leader, constantly reading books on leadership theory. Unlike the two other persons in the house, metal is not his favorite music, he prefers old school country & western like Tammy Wynette and Kitty Wells. He has a secret relationship with a prostitute, Beverley Hinna, whom he visits once a week. His greatest fear is being left by his sister Cecilie and best friend Rudi, like his dad left him when he was 12 to go to Houston and work in the oil business after Jan Inge and Cecilie's mom died. Jan Inge has set up a list of house and gang rules, one of them being that the Hillevåg-gang is anti-violence. The rule has been broken several times, and as See You Tomorrow unravels, Jan Inge must face the fact that he himself has become a killer. Jan Inge holds 12 chapters in See You Tomorrow.

Pål (born 1972). A forty-year-old man, a public employee. Pål is the single father of two teenage daughters. His economy is in bad shape, he has gotten himself a debt of well over one million Norwegian kroners, and in a pathetic attempt to solve his problems he makes contact with a guy he knew when he grew up and whom he has heard turned criminal: Rudi. He offers himself up to the Hillevåg-gang, stating that he will do anything for them if they can get him the money. This is the center of the crime-plot of See You Tomorrow and the one action that kickstarts the novel. Pål loves his daughters and his border collie, Zitha. Tore Renberg was inspired by the notorious Baasland-case whilst creating the Pål-character (a major criminal case in Norway where Bjarte Baasland, the son of a Norwegian bishop, got into a 70 million Norwegian kroner debt after gambling on the Internet). Pål holds 12 chapters in See You Tomorrow.

Tiril (born 1998). Tiril is the youngest of Pål's daughters. Tiril is an angry with everything. She dresses up in torn stockings, purple and black clothes, in the emo-style of the first decade of the 2000s. Tiril has an evening job at the local shop where she lives, at Madla, some kilometres outside of the town centre of Stavanger. Tiril writes LOVE/HATE on her knuckles, and says that one day she will travel to Little Rock, Arkansas – the hometown of Amy Lee, the singer of her favorite band, Evanescence. Tiril holds 10 chapters in See You Tomorrow.

Malene (born 1997). Renberg has stated Malene as his personal favorite. She is perhaps the most mature human being portrayed in his novel, even though she is only fifteen. Malene is a much calmer character than her raging sister. She is a highly talented gymnast. She is called “Daddy´s girl” and constantly worries about what her father is up to. Malene holds 9 chapters in See You Tomorrow.

Sandra (born 1997). This young girl was the start of the whole novel, according to Renberg. He began writing about Sandra in 2007, as a single portrait of a naîve and desperate young girl madly in love with a no-good super-hot foster home kid, not knowing what to do with this text. A couple of years later it became the start of what became See You Tomorrow. Sandra is a Christian, she is upper middle-class, and she has never in her life told a lie or dared to break any rules, let alone laws. She is in the same class as Malene, who also becomes her best friend as the plot of See You Tomorrow thickens. She will turn sixteen in a few weeks. She wears a silver cross around her neck and has a dangerous secret. She is in love with Daniel William Moi and she will not live until the end of See You Tomorrow. Sandra holds 14 chapters in See You Tomorrow.

Daniel William (born 1994). A foster home kid from Stavanger since his early childhood and one of the author's many portraits of damaged childhood, and perhaps the darkest one in his oeuvre. The reader never learns what has happened to Daniel in the past, but through Daniel's gothic language and nightmarish poetics, it is clear that he has witnessed severe dread. He is the lyricist of a metal band where he plays the drums. One of his lyrics goes like this: “I came down here to kill all of these girls / O Lord / Cause I´m a bad man / But I´m a real man”, echoing one of Renberg's modern heroes, Nick Cave, in its violent imagery. Daniel is seventeen years old, living with his foster mom Inger Ulland and her deaf daughter Veronika, and he is described as a boy “there were so many rumours about”, “the one in sixth grade nobody dared to talk to, the one all the girls thought was so hot with those deep eyes of his, and dangerous.” He is in love with Sandra, the meet at night after she finishes her evening job, but he is also drawn to the mystical Veronika. He drives a Suzuki AC50 and during the course of See You Tomorrow he becomes one of the novel's two murderers. Alongside Sandra, Daniel holds the most chapters in See You Tomorrow, 14.

Tong (born 1971). The darkest individual in See You Tomorrow. Tong was adopted from South Korea as a child and does not know his biological parents. When the novel starts, Tong is in prison, at Åna on Jæren. He is a member of the Hillevåg Gang, but the reader learns that he has plans to ditch them. Every week Cecilie visits him and the two have had a sexual relationship for several months. He is a brutal and violent character. He returns from prison two-thirds into the novel. Tong holds 4 chapters in See You Tomorrow.

Veronika (born 1997). Veronika is the most wicked and dangerous of the four young girls in See You Tomorrow. She is a politically uncorrect portrait from Renberg's hand, a character with a penchant for evil. Veronika is the daughter of Inger, and Daniel's foster-sister. She is also desperately in love with him and equally jealous of Sandra. Veronika is gravely hearing impaired. Veronika holds 5 chapters in See You Tomorrow.

Shaun (born 1998). A hooded slacker from a dysfunctional family at Tjensvoll, next to Madla, in Stavanger. He sniffs glue and is the same age as Tiril. He is secretly in love with her. Shaun has a constantly running nose, he listens to porn-rap (Akinyele´s “Put it in your mouth”, Greg Street´s “Smell Your Dick” etc.), and he is the brother of Bunny and Kenny. To his own surprise he becomes Tiril's boyfriend. Shaun holds the least chapters in See You Tomorrow, only 1, chapter 91.

One chapter of See You Tomorrow, the last one, titled “Change”, is not ascribed to a particular character.

== The Teksas-series ==
See You Tomorrow is the first novel in the Teksas-series. The Video Boy (2006) is considered a pre-study, and Attack From All Sides (2014) is the second novel in the series. The eclectic Teksas-novels come with a unique blend of Nordic social realism, southern gothic and the rich pulp of Western popular culture. Renberg - both a former student of literature and a rock musician - draws on everything from heavy metal to horror movies and classic literature in his post-modern power-literature. The Teksas novels are insistently defying genre whilst exploring the possibility of incorporating a multitude of genres within their own realm; drama, comedy, tragedy, crime, goth, suspense, young adult, grit. The novels are collective stories written in the tradition of William Faulkner, clearly also heavily influenced by the modern revolution in TV-series; The Sopranos, The Wire, Deadwood.

== Critical response ==
Swedish literary critic Victor Malm, of Sydsvenskan, wrote of See You Tomorrow and Attack From All Sides: "Renberg's novels are of international excellence [...] See You Tomorrow is a wild, compassionate, first-rate thriller [...] The penmanship, the personification and the abundantly idiomatic dialogue make See You Tomorrow and Attack From All Sides brilliantly realistic prose, not just within Scandinavia, but among the international elite." Expressen wrote "Tore Renberg is one of this year's most brightly shining stars ... It is an incredibly good novel … See You Tomorrow is an achievement of technical power. In vital, maximalist prose, the characters' perspectives change in a weaving movement, slowly taking us to an amazing crescendo. The tone feels new, fresh and heartfelt." Stephanie Boland, writing in The Quietus felt that "aspects of the novel seem utterly ordinary, but taken in its behemoth whole, it dazzles [...] See You Tomorrow is as boundary crossing as its author: defying easy genre designations, it centres around a crime story, but tempers its grit with romance, humour and a generous dose of pop culture."

In Denmark, Kristeligt Dagblad called See You tomorrow a "wonderful novel"–while The Danish Information wrote "It is wild, but also wildly funny... It is fantastic! ... Realistic? Probably not, but insanely fun, and insanely well executed". Jyllands-Posten awarded the novel five out of six stars and wrote “Renberg takes charge on the continent with See You Tomorrow. A book that involves both bursts of laughter and compassion… a joyful display of literary expression.”

In Norway VG, Dagbladet, Fædrelandsvennen, Addresseavisen, Trønder-Avisa, Tønsberg Blad og Brabok.no awarded See You Tomorrow 6 out of 6 stars. VG called the book "a prime example of the art of balance; innovative yet saturated with ancient tricks of storytelling". Addresseavisen wrote: "See You Tomorrow is impressive in every aspect - from its composition, language and credibility to its wit, palette and crescendos." Aftenposten called it: "A criminal display of power [...] a vitalistic tour de force" and Dagsavisen: "Six hundred pages of pure energy". Dagbladet wrote: "Wow, what a novel! ... Renberg's dark novel from Stavanger is filled with momentum, brutality, humour, poetry and musicality ... Renberg possesses a formidable talent for storytelling".
