= Kongsbakken Upper Secondary School =

- Kongsbakken videregående skole
- Emblem of Kongsbakken

Location
- Skolegata 16; Tromsø, Norway
- 69°39′01″N 18°56′54″E

Information
- Motto: Mens sana in corpore sano (Latin: a healthy mind in a healthy body)
- Founded: 1833; 193 years ago
- Head of school: Tonje Holm
- Age: 16 to 19
Colour
- Website: www.kongsbakken.vgs.no
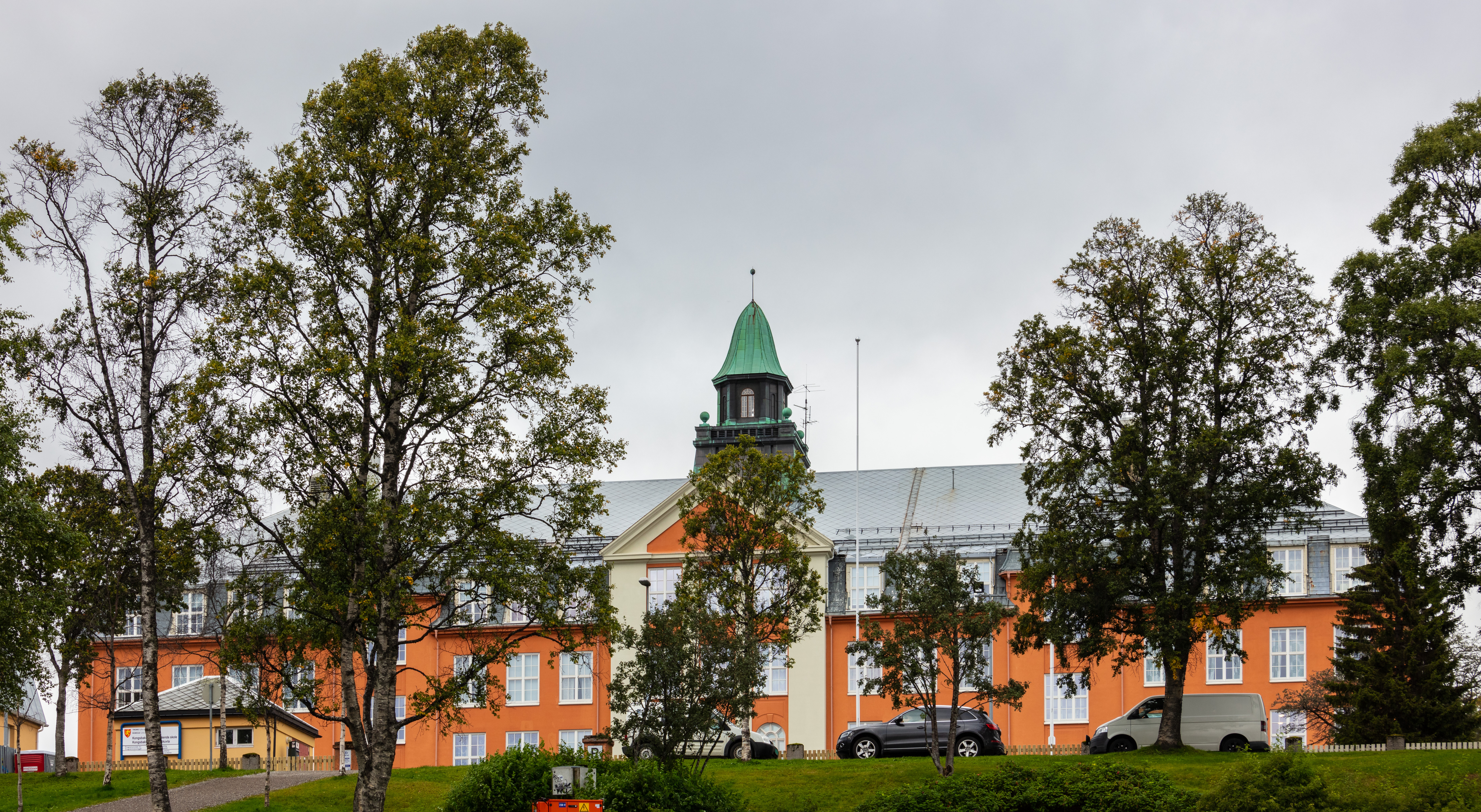

Kongsbakken Upper Secondary School (Norwegian: Kongsbakken videregående skole) is an upper secondary school in Tromsø, Norway. Founded in 1833, the school is one of Northern-Norway's oldest learning institutions. The school consists of a main building, and a building for the school's music, dance and drama pupils - the MD-building. In the year 2000, Kongsbakken videregående skole had approximately 650 pupils, with about as many boys as girls. The school administration consists of a headmaster, a deputy headmaster and five section leaders. Additionally, the school has janitors, counselors, office staff and a librarian. Approximately 80 teachers provide education at Kongsbakken.

The school offers the following educational programmes, which allow for higher education at a university or university college: realfag (Exact sciences), linguistic subjects and social science/economy, and music, dance and drama.

The school also has a special educational programme called forskerlinja (scientist programme) which focuses more on exact sciences. They make field trips to relevant places and institutions, including the Andøya Space center.

Since 1930, the students of the schools have made the annual Bragerevyen in their Christmas brakes, a revue premièring on 1 January.

== History ==
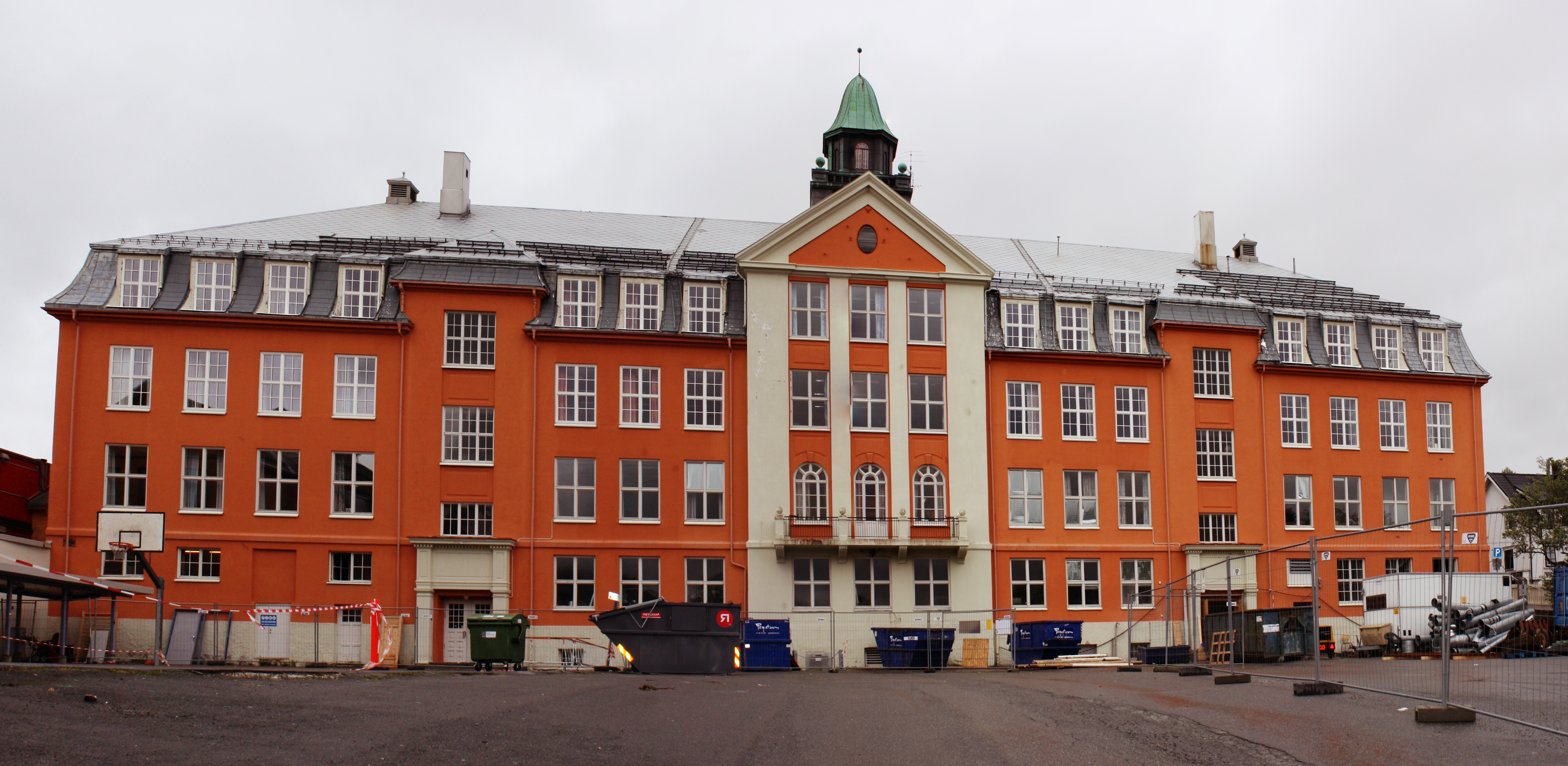
Main façade of the building seen from the east across the courtyard, in June 2010

The institution dates back to 1833 when Tromsø Middel- og Realskole opened, with two teachers and eighteen male students aged 12 to 16. At the time, the premises were three classrooms in a house that stood where Frederik Langes gate 14 is today. The two year educational programme comprised the subjects writing, mathematics, Norwegian, history, geography, religion, Latin, Greek, German and English (optional). The first headmaster was Frederik Lange.

The Norwegian system of education has evolved continually since the 1830s, hence the school has been known under the following names:

- 1833–1858: Tromsø Middel- og Realskole
- 1858–1870: Tromsö lærde og Realskole
- 1870–1965: Tromsø offentlige høiere almenskole
- 1965–1976: Tromsø Gymnas
- 1976–present: Kongsbakken videregående skole

== Notable alumni ==
- Håkon Gebhardt
- Anne Holt
- Espen Lind
- Dagny (singer)
- Ella Marie Hætta Isaksen
