= I Travel Alone =

- Directed by: Stian Kristiansen
- Starring: Rolf Kristian Larsen; Gustaf Hammarsten; Ingrid Bolsø Berdal
- Release date: 11 February 2011
- Running time: 94 minutes
- Country: Norway
- Language: Norwegian

I Travel Alone (Norwegian: Jeg reiser alene) is a 2011 Norwegian drama film directed by Stian Kristiansen. It is a sequel to The Man Who Loved Yngve from 2008 and was followed by the prequel The Orheim Company in 2012.

== Plot ==
Jarle Klepp is 25-year-old literature student (onomastic, Marcel Proust) at the University of Bergen in Norway. He suddenly discovers he has a 7-year-old daughter, when the mother (with whom he once had a one-night stand) sends her to him to take care for her for a week. He struggles with his new role, loses his girlfriend to his teacher and gets again close to the mother during a costume party for the children.
