= The Orheim Company =

- Directed by: Arild Andresen
- Starring: Vebjørn Enger; Kristoffer Joner; Cecilie Mosli
- Release date: 2 March 2012
- Running time: 104 minutes
- Country: Norway
- Language: Norwegian

The Orheim Company (Norwegian: Kompani Orheim) is a 2012 Norwegian drama film directed by Arild Andresen. It is a prequel to The Man Who Loved Yngve (2008) and I Travel Alone (2011).

== Plot ==
Jarle Klepp thinks back to his years as a teenager in a struggling family in Stavanger, Norway.
