= Arild Andresen (director) =

Norwegian film director

Arild Andresen (born 30 November 1967) is a Norwegian film director born in Kristiansand. He first directed advertisements, but later made his way into TV and film.

== Awards and recognition ==
In 2010, Andresen was awarded the Norwegian cinema managers' "Sølvklumpen" award for his film Liverpool Goolie.

In 2012, his Company Orheim won the top Dragon Award for Best Nordic Film at the Gothenburg Film Festival.
