= Per Dybvig =

Norwegian illustrator, visual artist and animator

- Born: 27 January 1964 (age 61); Stavanger, Norway
- Occupation: illustrator
- Notable work: De står i kø
- Awards: Norwegian Critics Prize for Literature (2025)

Per Dybvig (born 27 January 1964) is a Norwegian illustrator, visual artist, animator, and author of picture books. He has illustrated more than eighty books written by others, and was awarded the Norwegian Critics Prize for Literature in 2025, for his picture book De står i kø..

== Life and career ==
Born in Stavanger on 27 January 1964, Dybvig has worked as cartoonist for the newspapers Rogalands Avis and Stavanger Aftenblad, and illustrated more than eighty books. His book illustrations include humorous books by Per Inge Torkelsen, the children's book series Svein og rotta by Marit Nicolaysen, the series on Doktor Proktor by Jo Nesbø, and children's books by Ingvar Ambjørnsen, Trond Brænne and Torgeir Rebolledo Pedersen.

His first book with his own text and illustrations was the picture book Jegeren – en fortelling fra skogen (2015), picturing a bizarre forest universe with human-like animals and animal-like humans. The book was honoured as Årets vakreste bok (most beautiful book of the year) in 2016. He followed up with the picture book Svartfossen in 2018. Four of his illustrations from Svartfossen have been bought by the National Museum of Norway.

In 2024 he published the children's book De står i kø (English: They stand in a queue, or They stand in line ). A protagonist named Kvist (English: Twig) wants to find someone to play with. But the other (animal-like) creatures he/she meets do not want to play, they stand queued up in a line, for apparently no reason, just waiting. For this book he was awarded the Norwegian Critics Prize for Literature, in the category the year's best children's or youth's literature, in March 2025.

He has received several awards for his book illustrations, including Bokkunstprisen in 2013, Stavanger municipality cultural award (2014), and Teskjekjerringprisen (2015).
