= Harastølen =

Building in Luster, Norway

Coordinates: 61°26′26″N 7°25′39″E

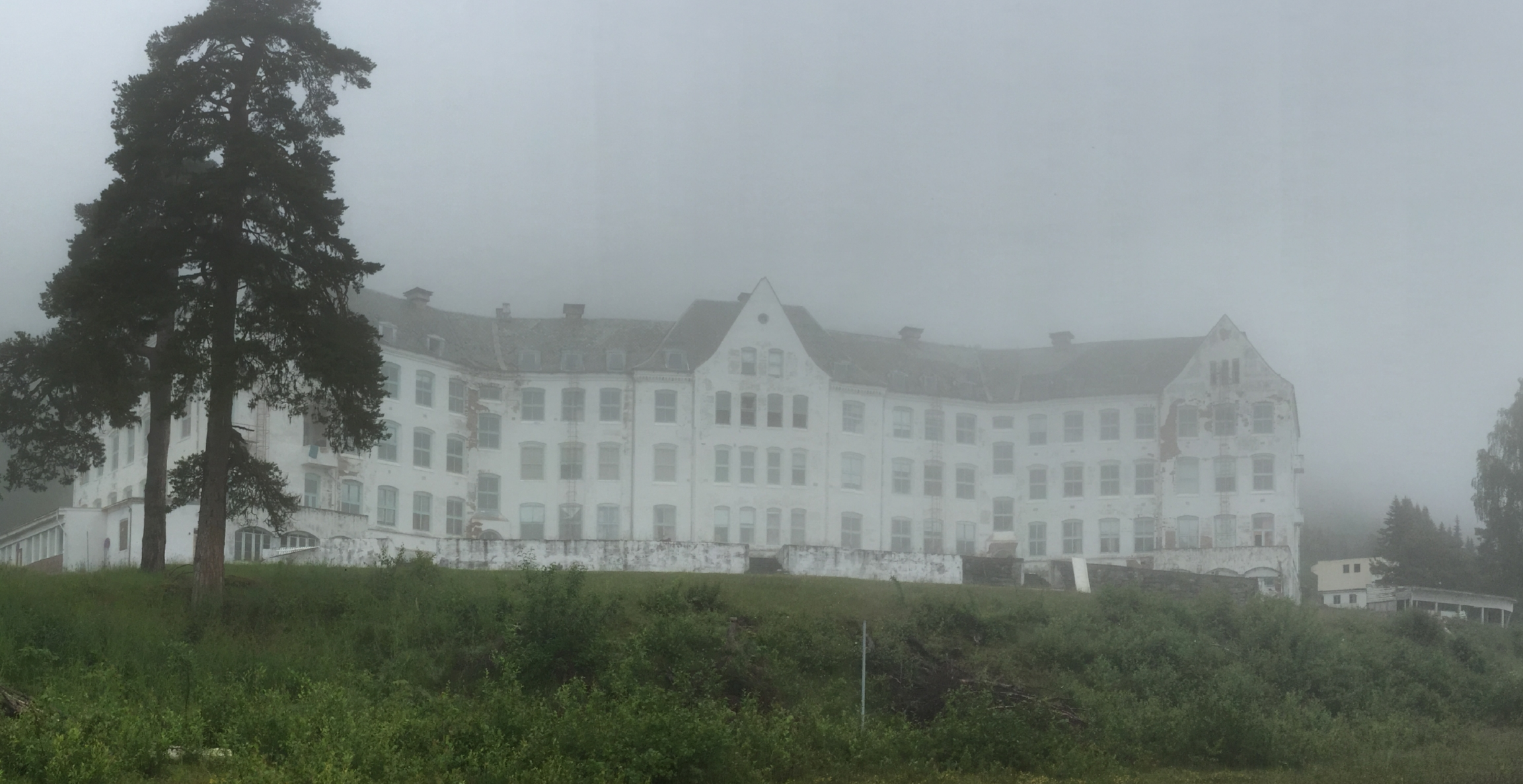
Harastølen in 2015

Harastølen, formerly Lyster Sanatorium, was a tuberculosis sanatorium and later psychiatric hospital in Norway established in 1902, located on a remote hill some 500 metres (1,600 ft) above the village of Luster and the Lustrafjorden in Luster Municipality in the region of Sogn. A 5,000 square metre large building, the sanatorium had its own water power supply, and was accessed by an aerial tramway.

== History ==
The sanatorium had about 150 patients at any given time and about as many employees, with about 15,000 total patients until its repurposing in 1958, and was the largest one in Norway. Attempted treatments of tuberculosis included being exposed to fresh and dry air, and surgical interventions such as plombage of the lungs and the removal of ribs, until antibiotics led to a revolution in the treatment of the disease in the 1940s. The average time at the sanatorium was 135 days. Between 1895 and 1955, about 250,000 Norwegians died from tuberculosis.

Drawn by one of the leading architects from Bergen, Adolph Fischer, the sanatorium was originally accessed by a now defunct aerial tramway, but a road was later constructed to the site. The main building was expanded several times, and several more buildings were constructed around the sanatorium, including workers residencies, a chapel, morgue and a stable. There was also a bakery, a cinema and a library, a well-maintained park, and the rooms had water closets and bathtubs which was not common in Norway at the time.

From 1959 to 1991 the former sanatorium was used as a psychiatric hospital. The closure was controversial, and many locals believed it only had financial motivations from the county. In the early 1990s it was used as an asylum seeker centre for a couple of years, as the first and largest operated by the state in Norway, with 340 refugees. There was conflict between the new residents and the local community after the refugees complained that it was worse to live there due to its remoteness than in Bosnia and Herzegovina, from which they had fled.

== Recent developments ==
In recent years, the derelict sanatorium has been used for filming the 2015 horror movie Villmark Asylum, and has been a popular destination for ghost hunters, urban explorers, bloggers and social media influencers, although recently the area has been closed off and intruders have faced police charges.

After being threatened with plans to demolish the building, it was in 2021 revealed that new owners had begun work to renovate the hospital as a hotel, although still not fully financed by investors.
