= Kristoffer Joner =

Norwegian actor (born 1972)

- Born: 19 September 1972 (age 53); Stavanger, Rogaland, Norway
- Occupation: Actor
- Years active: 1996–present

Kristoffer Joner (born 19 September 1972) is a Norwegian actor. He is best known for his roles in Villmark and The Man Who Loved Yngve. He was a part of Rogaland Teater when he was 14 years of age until his early 20s. He was one of the founders of Cementen pub located in Stavanger, Norway. In 1996, he got the role as Ståle Pettersen in an original NRK series called Offshore, a role he kept until the shows cancellation in 2000. In the same year, he got his first movie role in a Pål Jackman movie by the name of Detektor, where he played the role of a satanist.

In 2005, Joner received Amanda Award for best male actor, for his role in the movie Naboer, and again in 2012 for his role in The Orheim Company.

Additionally, he is the nephew of musician Sverre Joner, and cousin of singer Alexandra Joner. He is the father of actress Téa Grønner Joner who played his young adult daughter in War Sailor.

== Career ==
Joner's films include Detector, Mongoland, Villmark, Loose Ends, Samaritan, Min Misunnelige Frisør, Kissed by Winter, Naboer, Gymnaslærer Pedersen, The Man Who Loved Yngve, Hidden (Skjult) and War Sailor.

He was named one of the "Shooting Stars" by European Film Promotion in 2003.

== Awards ==
=== Amanda Award ===
2005 Best Male Actor – Naboer

2012 Best Male Actor – The Orheim Company

2017 Best Male Actor - Hjertestart

== Filmography ==
This filmography is not full but rather a representative one.

Year	Film (English Title)	Original Title	Role	Notes
1996	Offshore	Offshore	Ståle Pettersen	TV series
2000	Detector	Detektor	Jorgen (patient)	
2001	Mongoland	Mongoland	Kristoffer	
2002	Music For Weddings and Funerals	Musikk for Bryllup og Begravelser	Kelner	
2002	Falling Sky	Himmelfall	Reidar	
2002	~ Wendy House	Lekestue	Jostein	TV series
2003	Dark Woods	Villmark	Lasse	
2004	A Cry in the Woods	Den som frykter ulven	Erkki Jorma	
2004	Monster Thursday	Monstertorsdag	Doctor	
2004	My Jealous Barber	Min misunnelige frisør	Christian	
2004	All For Egil	Alt for Egil	Egil	
2004	Garfield: The Movie		Happy Chapman	Norwegian voice
2005	Next Door	Naboer	John	Amandaprisen for Best Male Actor
2005	Kissed by Winter	Vinterkyss	Kai	
2006	Comrade Pedersen	Gymnaslærer Pedersen	Knut Pedersen	
2006	Lotte from Gadgetville	Leiutajateküla Lotte	Susumu	Norwegian voice
2007	Codename Hunter	Kodenavn Hunter	Frode Müller	TV series
2008	The Man Who Loved Yngve	Mannen som elsket Yngve	Tom	
2008	The Last Joint Venture	Den siste revejakta	Carl Vang	
2009	Hidden	Skjult	Kai Koss (KK)	
2009	Rat Nights (Sleepless Nights)	Rottenetter	Frank Kristiansen	
2010	King of Devil's Island	Kongen av Bastøy	Bråthen	
2010	Brown Gold	Tomme Tønner	Finish	
2010	Bad Faith	Ond Tro (Swedish)	"X"	
2010	The Legend of the Fjord Witch	Kurt Josef Wagle Og Legenden om Fjordheksa	Gregor Hykkerud	
2011	Pax	Pax	Peter	
2011	Empty Barrels	Tomme Tønner 2/Det brune gullet	Finish	
2011	Graduates	Hjelp, vi er Russ		
2011	The Bambi Effect	Bambieffekten	Jonas	
2011	The Monitor	Babycall	Helge	
2012	The Orheim Company	Kompani Orheim	Terje Orheim	Amandaprisen for Best Male Actor
2012	All That Matters Is Past	Uskyld- Det viktigste er forbi	William	
2012	Call Girl	Call Girl	Sören Laurin-Wall	
2013	DAG	DAG	Kristoffer	TV series
2013	Kiss Me You Moron	Kyss meg for faen i helvete!	Theater instructor	
2014	Dead Snow 2: Red vs. Dead	Død Snø 2	Sidekick Zombie	
2014	Doktor Proktor's Magic Powder	Doktor Proktors prompepulver	Doktor Proktor	
2015	The Swimmer	The Swimmer	Frank	
2015	Mango: Life's Coincidences	Mango: Life's Coincidences	Trond	
2015	The Wave	Bølgen	Kristian Eikjord	
2015	The Revenant	The Revenant	Murphy	
2018	Mission: Impossible – Fallout	Mission: Impossible – Fallout	Nils Debruuk	
2018	The Quake	Skjelvet	Kristian Eikjord	
2018	History of Love			
2020, 2022	The Machinery	Maskineriet	Olle Hultén	TV series
2022	War Sailor			
2024	Family Therapy	Odrešitev za začetnike	Hunter	
2025	Don't Call Me Mama	Se meg	Jostein	It will compete for Crystal Globe at the KVIFF.
