= List of Norwegian films of the 2020s =

Some films produced in Norway in the 2020s:

== 2020s ==
| Title | Director | Cast | Genre | Release date |
|---|---|---|---|---|
2020
| Mortal | André Øvredal | Nat Wolf | Fantasy adventure | 28 February 2020 |
| Karnawal | Juan Pablo Félix | Alfredo Castro, Martin López Lacci, Mónica Lairana, Diego Cremonesi, Adrián Fondari, Sergio Prina, José Luis Arias, Ángel Apolonio Cruz, Fernando Lamas Ventura | Coming-of-age, Drama | 21 March 2020 |
| Cadaver | Jarand Herdal | Gitte Witt, Thomas Gullestad, Thorbjørn Harr | Horror | 22 October 2020 |
| Betrayed | Eirik Svensson | Jakob Oftebro, Pia Halvorsen | Drama | 25 December 2020 |
2021
| Ninjababy | Yngvild Sve Flikke | Kristine Thorp, Arthur Berning, Nader Khademi | Dramedy | 21 May 2021 |
| The Trip | Tommy Wirkola | Aksel Hennie, Noomi Rapace | Action-comedy | 30 July 2021 |
| The Innocents | Eskil Vogt | Rakel Lenora Fløttum, Ellen Dorrit Petersen | Horror | 27 August 2021 |
| The Middle Man | Bent Hamer | Pål Sverre Hagen, Tuva Novotny, Paul Gross, Don McKellar, Rossif Sutherland | Comedy | 17 September 2021 |
| The Worst Person in the World | Joachim Trier | Renate Reinsve, Anders Danielsen Lie | Dark comedy-drama | 13 October 2021 |
2022
| Battle: Freestyle | Ingvild Søderlind | Lisa Teige, Fabian Svegaard Tapia | Drama, Music, Romance | 1 April 2022 |
| War Sailor | Gunnar Vikene | Kristoffer Joner, Pål Sverre Hagen and Ine Marie Wilmann | War Drama | 24 August 2022 |
| Sick of Myself | Kristoffer Borgli | Kristine Kujath Thorp, Eirik Sæther | Black comedy | 9 September 2022 |
| Just Super | Rasmus A. Sivertsen | Hennika Eggum Huuse, Todd Monrad Vistven | Animation, Superhero | 30 September 2022 |
| Viking Wolf | Stig Svendsen | Liv Mjönes, Elli Rhiannon Müller Osborne, Arthur Hakalahti and Sjur Vatne Brean | Horror Thriller | 18 November 2022 |
| Troll | Roar Uthaug | Ine Marie Wilmann, Kim Falck, Mads Sjøgård Pettersen | Monster | 1 December 2022 |
| Narvik | Erik Skjoldbjærg | Kristine Hartgen, Carl Martin Eggsbø | War | 25 December 2022 |
2023
| Dancing Queen | Aurora Langaas Gossé | Anne Marit Jacobsen, Andrea Bræin Hovig, Cengiz Al, Anders Baasmo, Frida Ånnevik, Viljar Knutsen Bjaadal | Family, Dance | 18 February 2023 |
| There's Something in the Barn | Magnus Martens | Martin Starr, Amrita Acharia, Kiran Shah | Fantasy Horror Comedy | 10 November 2023 |
| Christmas As Usual | Petter Holmsen | Ida Ursin-Holm, Kanan Gill, Marit Andreassen | Romantic comedy | 6 December 2023 |
| The Arctic Convoy | Henrik Martin Dahlsbakken | Tobias Santelmann, Fredrik Stenberg Ditlev-Simonsen, Adam Lundgren, Anders Baasmo | War drama | 25 December 2023 |
2024
| Handling the Undead | Thea Hvistendahl | Renate Reinsve, Bahar Pars, Anders Danielsen Lie | Horror-mystery | 9 February 2024 |
| Sex | Dag Johan Haugerud | Jan Gunnar Røise, Thorbjørn Harr | Drama | 17 February 2024 |
| An Army of Women | Julie Lunde Lillesæter | | Documentary | 8 March 2024 |
| Quisling: The Final Days | Erik Poppe | Gard B. Eidsvold, Anders Danielsen Lie, Lisa Carlehed, Lisa Loven Kongsli | Historical drama | 18 August 2024 |
| Love | Dag Johan Haugerud | Andrea Bræin Hovig, Tayo Cittadella Jacobsen | Drama | 6 September 2024 |
| Armand | Halfdan Ullmann Tøndel | Renate Reinsve, Ellen Dorrit Petersen, Endre Hellestveit | Drama | 27 September 2024 |
| Dreams (Sex Love) | Dag Johan Haugerud | Ane Dahl Torp, Selome Emnetu,Ella Øverbye, Anne Marit Jacobsen | Drama | 4 October 2024 |
| Number 24 | John Andreas Andersen | Sjur Vatne Brean, Erik Hivju | Historical Drama | 30 October 2024 |
2025
| The Battle of Oslo | Daniel Fahre | Bjørn Sundquist, Jon Øigarden, Øystein Røger, Axel Bøyum, Fridtjov Såheim, Odin Waage | Historical war thriller | 26 September 2025 |
