= Beware of Children (film) =

2019 Norwegian drama film

- Poster
- Norwegian: Barn
- Directed by: Dag Johan Haugerud
- Written by: Dag Johan Haugerud
- Produced by: Yngve Sæther
- Starring: Henriette Steenstrup; Jan Gunnar Røise; Thorbjørn Harr; Brynjar Åbel Bandlien; Andrea Bræin Hovig; Hans Olav Brenner; Ella Øverbye; Anne Marit Jacobsen
- Cinematography: Øystein Mamen
- Edited by: Jens Christian Fodstad
- Music by: Peder Kjellsby; Arnaud Fleurent-Didier
- Production companies: Motlys; Arthaus; Plattform Produktion; Film i Väst; Norsk Filminstitutt
- Distributed by: Arti Film
- Release dates: 3 September 2019 (Venice); 13 September 2019 (Norway)
- Running time: 157 minutes
- Countries: Norway; Sweden
- Language: Norwegian

Beware of Children (Norwegian: Barn) is a 2019 Norwegian drama film, written and directed by Dag Johan Haugerud.

== Premise ==
During a break in school, Lykke, the daughter of a Labour Party member, seriously injures her classmate Jamie, the son of a right-wing politician.

== Cast ==
- Henriette Steenstrup as Liv
- Jan Gunnar Røise as Anders
- Thorbjørn Harr as Per Erik Lundemo
- Brynjar Åbel Bandlien as Jan
- Andrea Bræin Hovig as Eva
- Hans Olav Brenner as Sigurd
- Ella Øverbye as Lykke
- Anne Marit Jacobsen as Torunn

== Release ==
The film had its world premiere on 3 September 2019 at the 76th Venice International Film Festival during the Venice Days section. Beware of Children had a theatrical release in Norway on 13 September 2019.

== Accolades ==
Award	Date	Category	Recipient	Result	Ref.
Gothenburg Film Festival	1 February 2020	Best Nordic Film	Beware of Children	Won	
Gothenburg Film Festival	1 February 2020	Best Acting	Henriette Steenstrup	Won	
Kanon Award	5 March 2020	Best Director	Dag Johan Haugerud	Won	
Kanon Award	5 March 2020	Best Actor	Jan Gunnar Røise	Won	
Kanon Award	5 March 2020	Best Actress	Henriette Steenstrup	Nominated	
Kanon Award	5 March 2020	Best Screenplay	Dag Johan Haugerud	Won	
Kanon Award	5 March 2020	Best Cinematography	Øystein Mamen	Nominated	
Kanon Award	5 March 2020	Best Editing	Jens Christian Fodstad	Won	
Amanda Award	14 August 2020	Best Norwegian Feature Film	Beware of Children	Won	
Amanda Award	14 August 2020	Best Director	Dag Johan Haugerud	Won	
Amanda Award	14 August 2020	Best Actress	Henriette Steenstrup	Nominated	
Amanda Award	14 August 2020	Best Actor	Jan Gunnar Røise	Won	
Amanda Award	14 August 2020	Best Supporting Actor	Thorbjørn Harr	Won	
Amanda Award	14 August 2020	Best Screenplay	Dag Johan Haugerud	Won	
Amanda Award	14 August 2020	Best Cinematography	Øystein Mamen	Won	
Amanda Award	14 August 2020	Best Sound Design	Gisle Tveito	Won	
Amanda Award	14 August 2020	Best Original Score	Peder Kjellsby and Arnaud Fleurent-Didier	Won	
Amanda Award	14 August 2020	Best Editing	Jens Christian Fodstad	Won	
Nordic Council Film Prize	28 October 2020	Best Film	Beware of Children	Won	
