= Henriette Steenstrup =

Norwegian actress (born 1974)

- Born: 29 September 1974 (age 52); Oslo, Norway
- Education: Lee Strasberg Theatre and Film Institute; Oslo National Academy of the Arts
- Occupations: Actress, comedian, screenwriter
- Spouse(s): Fridtjov Såheim (m. 2006–2016) Rune Assmann (2019)
- Awards: Komiprisen (2014); Gullruten (2022)

Henriette Steenstrup (born 29 September 1974) is a Norwegian actress, comedian, and screenwriter. She is known for her hit drama series Pørni (2021–2025).

== Early life and education ==
Henriette Steenstrup was born in Oslo, Norway, on 29 September 1974.

She attended Lee Strasberg Theatre and Film Institute in New York City, and graduated from the Oslo National Academy of the Arts in 2003.

== Career ==
With a background as child actress for NRK, appearing in audio plays and in television shows such as Jul i Skomakergata, Halvsju, and Kroppen, Steenstrup's first adult television commission was in 1996 co-hosting the children's show Kykelikokos. She played minor roles in several films, including Budbringeren (1997), Mother's Elling (2003), Comrade Pedersen (2006), and Turn Me On, Dammit! (2011).

After graduating from drama school, she was assigned to Nationaltheatret from 2004. Her breakthrough as scriptwriter was the TV show En god nummer to for TV2 in 2008.

In 2014 Steenstrup won Komiprisen for the show En får væra som en er – en Ole Ivars-musikal. In 2019 she played the character "Liv" in Dag Johan Haugerud's Beware of Children, for which she won the Dragon Award for best acting at the Gothenburg Film Festival.

Steenstrup was introduced to international audiences as Turid Seier, mother to hero Magne Seier, in the 2020 Norwegian fantasy drama series Ragnarok, which aired on Netflix.

In 2021 she created, wrote, and starred in the drama series Pørni, for which she won Seriekritikerprisen. Pørni is about the life of the single mother Pernille "Pørni" Middelthon, who lives with two daughters and a father who has just come out as gay. The series was very well received by critics and popular with audiences, becoming the most watched Norwegian series on streaming service Viaplay ever. It went on to Netflix with the fourth season in 2024, and it ended with the fifth season in 2025. In October 2026, an English-language version of the series, titled Lenni was announced by Apple TV. It is adapted by Sara Sheller and directed by Dearbhla Walsh, where Toni Collette plays the principal character. Executive producers include Colette, Sheller, Walsh, Bruna Papandrea, Steve Hutensky, Katie Amos, Avi Nir, and Keren Shahar, as well as Steenstrup, Bård Fjulsrud, and Tanya Badendyck. The filming is underway in Sydney, supported by Screen NSW’s Made in NSW Fund.

In 2025, Stenstrup made the television series Nepobaby for TV 2, in which she starred, along with Vivild Falk Berg from Pørni. It won best screenplay and ensemble cast at Canneseries in April, ahead of its release in Norway in October 2025, and was sold to several European distributors.

Her books include Verdens beste mamma – not (2013), and four books related to her comedy show character "Edel".

== Recognition and awards ==
Pørni was awarded four awards in Gullruten in 2022, including best script for a drama series, and best actor for Steenstrup. It also won best humor drama at the Humor Prize in the same year

Steenstrup won Telenor's Culture Prize in 2024.

== Personal life ==
Steenstrup was married to actor Fridtjov Såheim from 2006 to 2016, and has two children with him. She married political scientist Rune Assmann in 2019.
