= 53rd Norwegian International Film Festival =

2025 edition of the festival

- Opening film: The Battle of Oslo by Daniel Fahre
- Closing film: Eagles of the Republic by Tarik Saleh
- Location: Haugesund, Norway
- Founded: 1973; 53 years ago
- Awards: Amanda Award
- Directors: Tonje Hardersen
- Hosted by: The Norwegian Film Festival Board
- No. of films: 75
- Festival date: Opening: 16 August 2025; Closing: 22 August 2025
- Website: www.filmfestivalen.no

Norwegian International Film Festival
- 54th 52nd

The 53rd Norwegian International Film Festival was held from 16 to 22 August 2025. The festival presented 75 feature-length films alongside a broad selection of events, including the New Nordic Films market, the Next Nordic Generation competition, and the Amanda Award ceremony scheduled for 16 August. It opened on 17 August with the world premiere of The Battle of Oslo by Daniel Fahre.

The festival closed on 22 August with 2025 Egyptian Arabic-language political thriller film Eagles of the Republic written and directed by Tarik Saleh. The Audience Award went to Christy by Brendan Canty, and The Ray of Sunshine award was awarded to Madly, by Paolo Genovese.

== Events ==
=== Haugesund Walk of Fame ===
On 16 August 2025 'Haugesund Walk of Fame', an award in the form of granite blocks laid in Haugesund's Haraldsgata was conferred on Lise Fjeldstad,a Norwegian actress and Thorbjørn Harr, a Norwegian actor, recognising their contributions to stage and screen.

=== The Amanda Awards 2025 ===
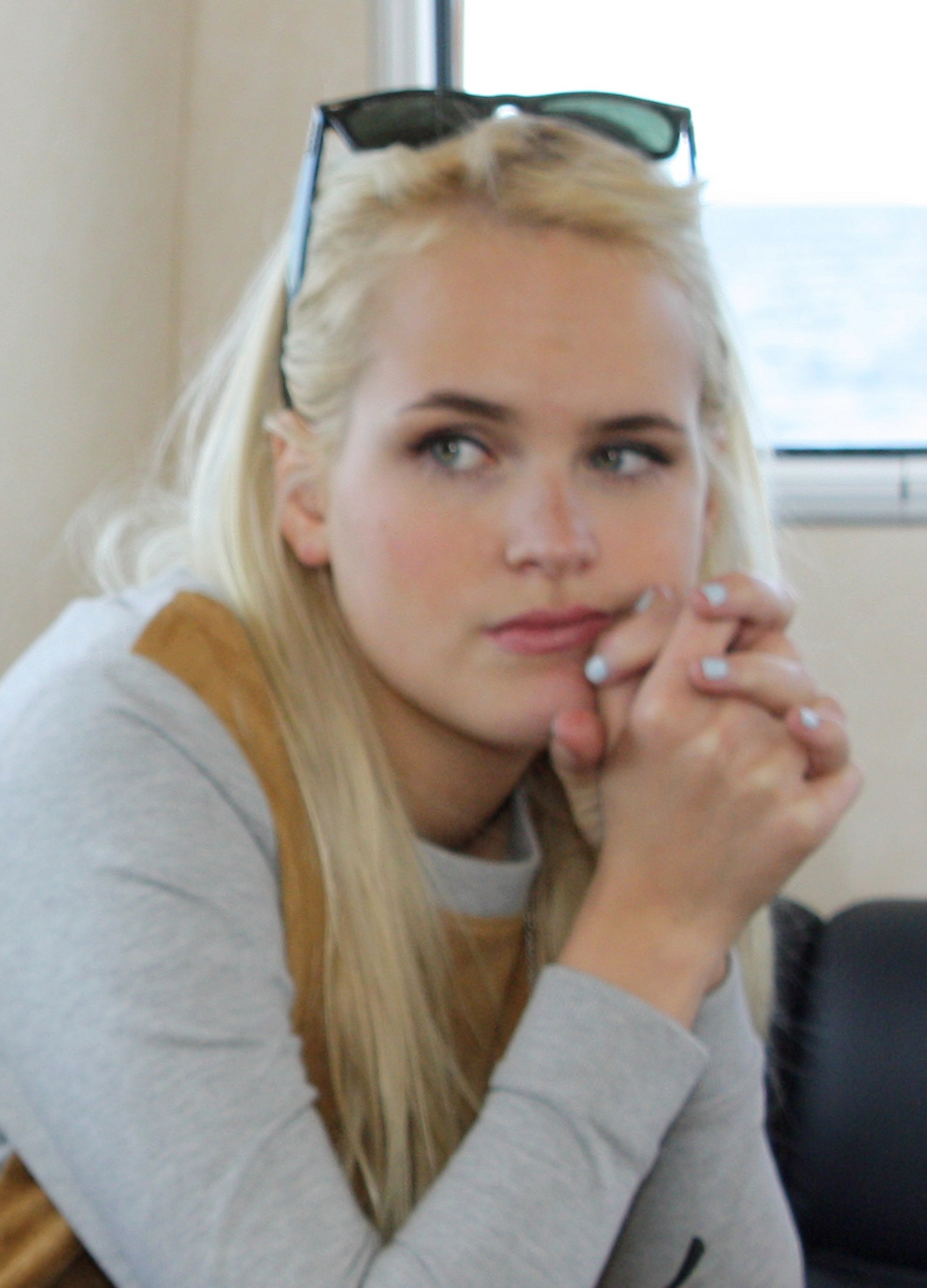
Linnéa Myhre host of the Amanda Award

The 53rd edition held the 41st Amanda Award ceremony hosted by Vegard Larsen and Linnéa Myhre on 16 August. The awards honoured achievements in 21 categories.

=== Masterclass with John M. Jacobsen ===
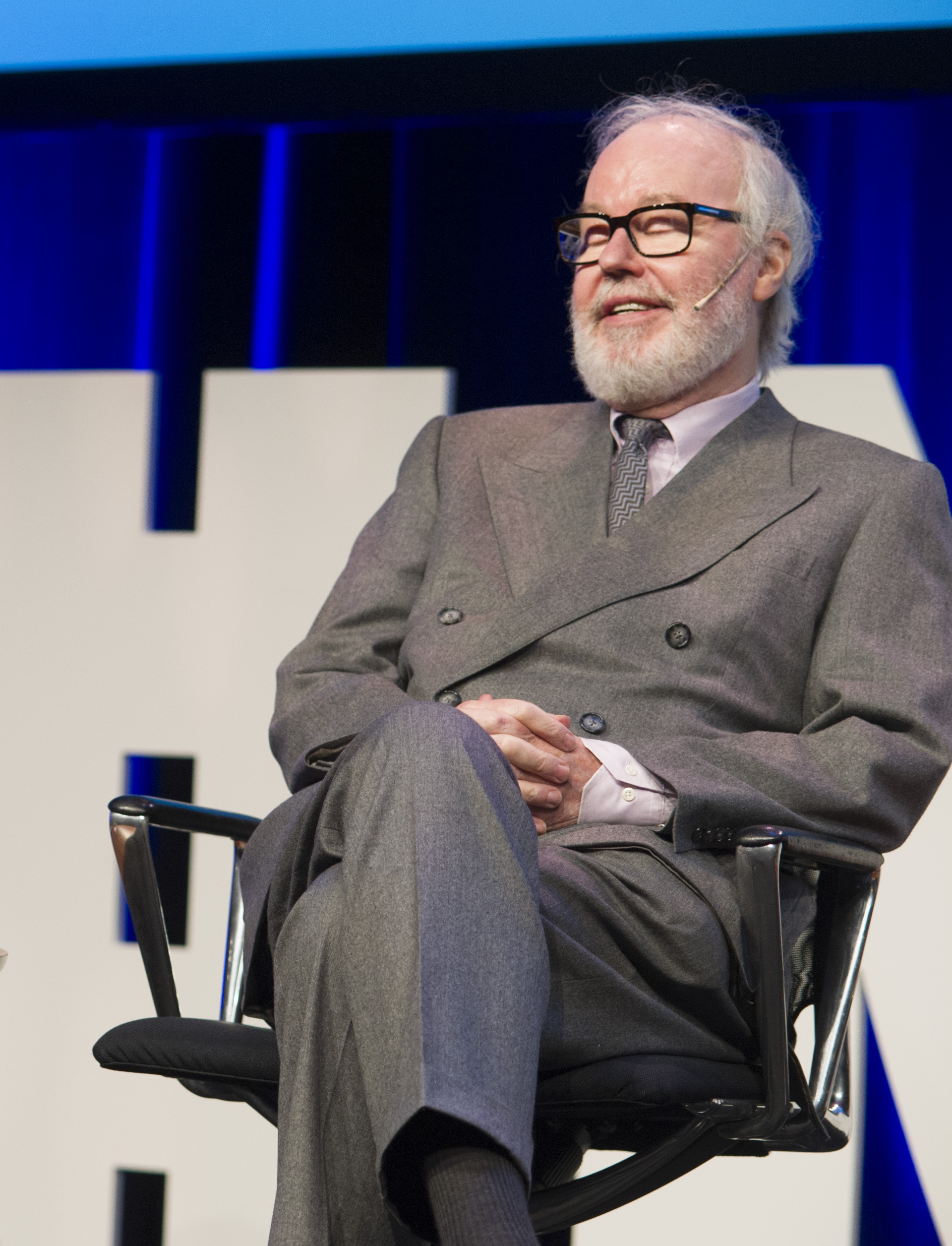
John M. Jacobsen honoured at the festival

The festival will pay tribute on 17 August to Norwegian film producer John M. Jacobsen, by hosting a masterclass and a special screening of the 2010 Norwegian dark fantasy film Troll Hunter co-produced by him.

=== Norwegian ArchFest ===
The 7th edition of the architecture film festival Norwegian ArchFest, organized by the Department of Urban Development in Haugesund Municipality and takes place with the Norwegian International Film Festival, will have Oscar-nominated Norwegian actress, screenwriter and director Mona Fastvold as the guest. She will open the festival with her 2024 epic period drama film The Brutalist by Brady Corbet.

=== The 2025 Film Festival Exhibition ===
Haugesund Art Association, The Norwegian International Film Festival and Haugalandmuseet–Haugesund Art Gallery organized a Vernissage at Haugesund Art Gallery of Maiken Stene's exhibits on 17 August.

== Jury ==
=== Amanda Awards ===
- Espen Aukan, Norwegian screenwriter and playwright
- Cengiz Al, Norwegian actor and dancer
- Kathrine Thorborg Johansen, Norwegian actress
- Grethe Bøe, Norwegian actress, director and crime writer
- Henrik Martin Dahlsbakken, Norwegian film director and screenwriter
- Are Sjaastad, production designer
- Martin Ask Eriksen, visual effects artist
- Oskar Dahlsbakken, Norwegian cinematographer
- Jon Endre Mørk, editor
- Vegard Ronæss Soldal, sound designer
- Kjetil Bjerkestrand, Norwegian keyboardist, composer, arranger and record producer
- Thorvald Nilsen, producer
- Guri Neby, producer
- Nell Knudsen, Costume designer for film, TV and theatre. Based in Oslo and Prague

=== Next Nordic Generation ===
- Bahareh Badavi, a Norwegian playwright
- Bjørn Eivind, a Norwegian filmmaker
- Marte Hansen, producer, writer, and production Manager

== Official selection ==
=== Main Programme ===
English title	Original title	Director(s)	Production country(ies)
Alpha		Julia Ducournau	France, Belgium
A Private Life	Vie privée	Rebecca Zlotowski	France
The Balconettes	Les Femmes au Balcon	Noémie Merlant	France
The Battle of Oslo	Blücher	Daniel Fahre	Norway
Christy		Brendan Canty	United Kingdom, Ireland
The Great Lillian Hall		Michael Cristofer	United States
Köln 75		Ido Fluk	Germany, Poland, Belgium
Late Shift	Heldin	Petra Volpe	Switzerland, Germany
Leave One Day	Partir un jour	Amélie Bonnin	France
Nouvelle Vague		Richard Linklater	France
Orwell: 2+2=5		Raoul Peck	France, United States
Peacock	Pfau – Bin ich echt?	Bernhard Wenger	Austria, Germany
The Portuguese House	Una quinta portuguesa	Avelina Prat	Spain, Portugal
Psycho Therapy: The Shallow Tale of a Writer Who Decided to Write About a Serial Killer		Tolga Karaçelik	United States, Turkey
Sorry, Baby		Eva Victor	United States
Young Mothers	Jeunes mères	Jean-Pierre and Luc Dardenne	Belgium, France

=== Nordic Focus ===
English title	Original title	Director(s)	Production country(ies)
100 Litres of Gold		Teemu Nikki	Finland, Italy
A Light That Never Goes Out		Lauri-Matti Parppei	Finland, Norway
Beginnings	Begyndelser	Jeanette Nordahl	Denmark
The Cat Kingdom		John Hellberg and Bernhard Rasmusson	Sweden
The Dance Club		Lisa Langseth	Sweden
Eagles of the Republic		Tarik Saleh	Sweden, France, Denmark, Finland
Welcome to the Moon		Aske Bang	Denmark

=== French Touch ===
English title	Original title	Director(s)	Production country(ies)
Adam's Interest	L'intérêt d'Adam	Laura Wandel	Belgium, France
In the Nguyen Kitchen	Dans la cuisine des nguyen	Stéphane Ly-Cuong	France
Meteors	Météors	Hubert Charuel	France
The Party’s Over	Classe Moyenne	Antony Cordier	France
Summer Beats	Ma Frère	Lise Akoka, Romane Gueret	France

=== Amanda Nominees ===
English title	Original title	Director(s)	Production country(ies)
Armand		Halfdan Ullmann Tøndel	Norway, Netherlands, Germany, Sweden
Dreams (Sex Love)	Drømmer	Dag Johan Haugerud	Norway
Loveable	Elskling	Lilja Ingolfsdottir	Norway
Safe House	Før Mørket	Eirik Svensson	Norway
The Ugly Stepsister	Den stygge stesøsteren	Emilie Blichfeldt	Norway, Poland, Sweden, Denmark

=== Norwegian Archfest ===
English title	Original title	Director(s)	Production country(ies)
The Brutalist		Brady Corbet	United States, United Kingdom, Hungary
E.1027: Eileen Gray and the House by the Sea		Beatrice Minger, Christoph Schaub	Switzerland
The Great Arch	l'inconnu de la grande arche	Stéphane Demoustier	France
The Residence	Dalloway	Yann Gozlan	France, Belgium
Schindler Space Architect		Valentina Ganeva	United States

=== Special Showing ===
English title	Original title	Director(s)	Production country(ies)
Breathless (1960)	À bout de souffle	Jean-Luc Godard	France
Diamond (2024)	Diamanti	Ferzan Özpetek	Italy
Fatherhood (2025)	Tre Fedre	Even G. Benestad, August Baugstø Hanssen	Norway
It Was Just an Accident	یک تصادف ساده	Jafar Panahi	Iran, France, Luxembourg

=== Young Films ===
English title	Original title	Director(s)	Production country(ies)
Hacking Hate		Simon Klose	Sweden, Denmark, Norway
Holy Cow	Vingt Dieux!	Louise Courvoisier	France
Kneecap		Rich Peppiatt	Ireland, United Kingdom
Memoir of a Snail		Adam Elliot	Australia

=== Cinemagi ===
English title	Original title	Director(s)	Production country(ies)
The Badgers	Grevlingene	Paul M. Lundø	Norway
Dancing Queen in Hollywood		Aurora Gossé	Norway
Hola Frida!		André Kadi, Karine Vézina	France, Canada
Honey		Natasha Arthy	Denmark
Maybe Elephants	Kanskje det var elefanter	Torill Kove	Norway, Canada

=== Perspectives ===
English title	Original title	Director(s)	Production country(ies)
Coexistence, My Ass!		Amber Fares	United States, France
DJ Ahmet		Georgi M. Unkovski	North Macedonia, Czech Republic, Serbia, Croatia
Gaucho Gaucho		Michael Dweck, Gregory Kershaw	United States, Argentina
Rebuilding		Max Walker-Silverman	United States

=== Next Nordic Generation ===
These are the nominated films in this section:

English title	Original title	Director(s)	Production company(ies)
Astro TV		Magdaleena Jakkila	Aalto ELO Film School
Dream Daddy		Johanna Milerud	HDK-Valand
The Lightning Rod		Helmi Donner	Aalto ELO Film School
My Name Is Hope		Sherwan Haji	Aalto ELO Film School
Pannbiff Pommes Chicken Teriyaki		Matti Johansson	Stockholm University of the Arts
Hillestad	Poter På Snø	Edvard Stangvik	Westerdals, Kristiania University Campus
Recast		Severi Vilkko	Aalto ELO Film School
The Seekers		Helena Hyvärinen	Aalto ELO Film School
Soft Armor		Gine Kippenbroek	National Film School of Denmark
Under A Broken Wing		Sarah Carlsen	National Film School of Denmark

== Awards and winners ==
The Audience Award was won by Christy by Brendan Canty and Ray of Sunshine Award by Madly by Paolo Genovese.

- Storyline Production Award: The Greatest Illusion, by Benjamin Ree
- The Ray of Sunshine (digital fine print by Camilla Thuv): Madly, by Paolo Genovese
- The Audience Award (diploma): Christy by Brendan Canty
- The Norwegian International Film Festival and Liv Ullmann’s Honorary Award (Statuette by Nina Sundbye): Birger Vestmo
- Next Nordic Generation Award (diploma): Sherwan Haji for My Name Is Hope
- Honourable Mention: The Lighting Rod by Helmi Donner
- Best Project Award (diploma): Wannabe by Patricia Bbaale Bandak
- Honourable Mention: Silverwhite by Martti Helde

=== Special awards ===
- Haugesund Walk of Fame:
  - Lise Fjeldstad

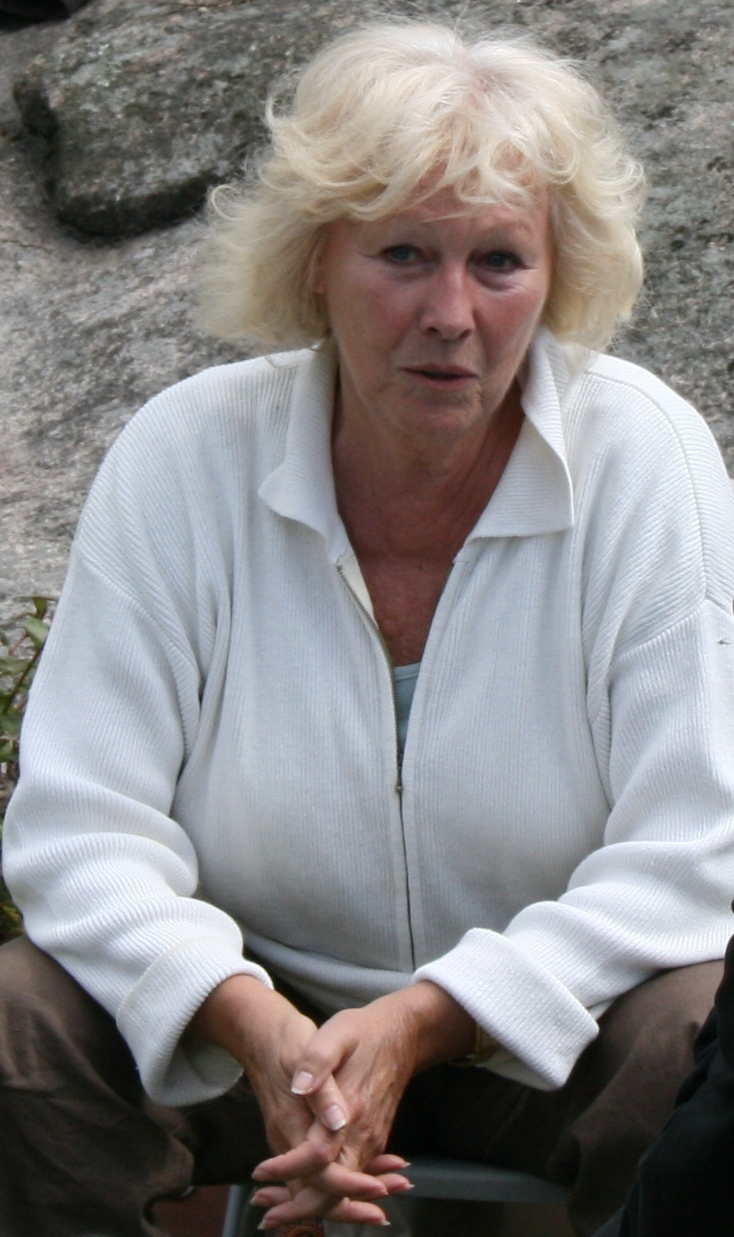
Lise Fjeldstad recipient of the Haugesund Walk of Fame

  - Thorbjørn Harr

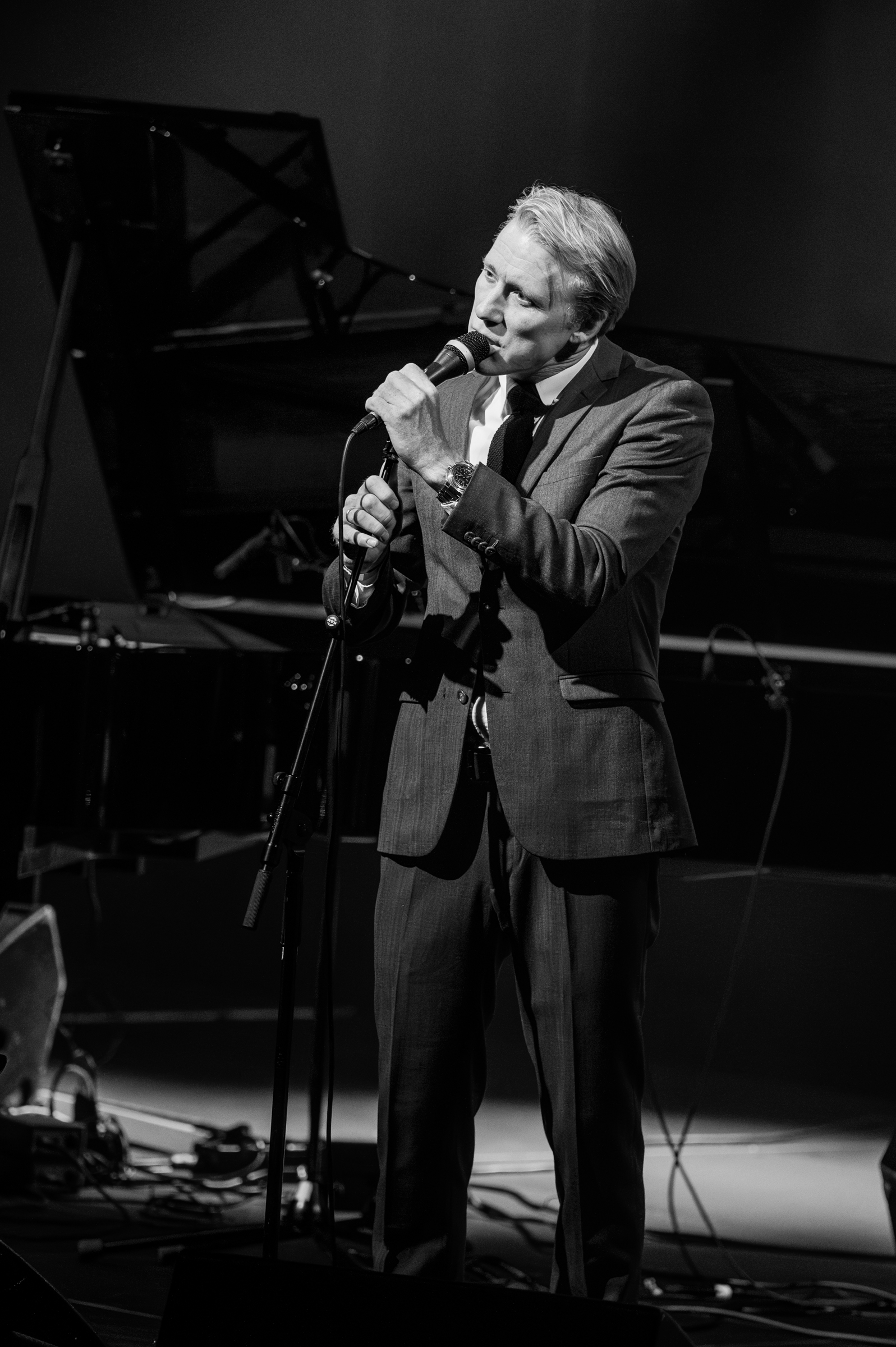
Thorbjørn Harr recipient of the Haugesund Walk of Fame
