= Sophie's World (film) =

1999 Norwegian adventure film

- Directed by: Erik Gustavson
- Written by: Jostein Gaarder (novel); Petter Skavlan (writer)
- Produced by: John M. Jacobsen; Oddvar Bull Tuhus
- Starring: Silje Storstein; Tomas von Brömssen; Andrine Sæther; Nils Vogt
- Cinematography: Kjell Vassdal
- Music by: Randall Meyers
- Release date: 6 August 1999 (Norway)
- Running time: 113 minutes
- Country: Norway
- Language: Various
- Budget: $10 million
- Box office: $1.3 million (Norway)

Sophie's World (Sofies verden) is a 1999 Norwegian drama–adventure film directed by Erik Gustavson and starring Silje Storstein as Sophie. It is an adaptation of the 1991 novel of the same name by Jostein Gaarder. Upon its release in 1999 it was the most expensive film to date in Norway.

It has since been released on DVD dubbed into German. An English-subtitled DVD was released in 2005 in the UK and, likewise, a Dutch-subtitled DVD was released in the Netherlands.

== Cast ==
- Silje Storstein as Sofie Amundsen / Hilde Møller Knag
- Tomas von Brömssen as Alberto Knox
- Andrine Sæther as Sofie's mother
- Bjørn Floberg as Major Albert Knag
- Hans Alfredson as Socrates
- Nils Vogt as Lærer Jacobsen
- Minken Fosheim as Hilde's mother
- Edda Trandum Grjotheim as Jorunn
- Arne Haakenaasen Dahl as Georg / Mischa / Giovanni
- Sullivan Lloyd Nordrum as Jørgen
- Kjersti Holmen as Fru Johnsen
- Jon Eivind Gullord as the guide in Greece

== Box office ==
The film was the second highest-grossing Norwegian film for the year with admissions of 200,000 and a gross of 9.4 million Krone($1.3 million).
