= Kieler Street =

Norwegian crime television series

- Kielergata
- Genre: Thriller; crime fiction; drama
- Created by: Stig Frode Henriksen; Jesper Sundnes; Patrik Syversen
- Written by: Stig Frode Henriksen; Jesper Sundnes; Patrik Syversen
- Directed by: Patrik Syversen; Cecilie A. Mosli
- Starring: Thorbjørn Harr; Andrea Bræin Hovig; Ylva Fuglud
- Country of origin: Norway
- Original language: Norwegian
- No. of seasons: 1
- No. of episodes: 10 (list of episodes)

Production
- Executive producers: Ole Marius Araldsen; Anne Kolbjørnsen; Christopher Haug
- Producer: Kornelia Lund
- Running time: 45 mins. (per episode)

Original release
- Network: TV 2
- Release: October 18 – December 13, 2018

Kieler Street (Norwegian: Kielergata) is a Norwegian ten-part television crime series, which premiered on October 18, 2018 on TV 2 and TV 2 Sumo. It was created by Stig Frode Henriksen, Jesper Sundnes and Patrik Syversen. It was directed by Syversen and Cecilie A. Mosli. The main protagonist, Jonas Schulman (Thorbjørn Harr) is a former criminal who had started a new life and new identity in the fictional small town of Slusvik. Andrea Bræin Hovig portrays his wife, Elin and Ylva Fuglerud acts as his stepdaughter, Sofie. When a friend confronts Jonas about his secret past, he suspects blackmail, kills the friend and struggles to maintain his "normal life" façade. The series was mainly filmed in Fetsund, Ørje and Aurskog.

The series was nominated for four awards ahead of Gullruten 2019: best drama series, best actor (Harr), best clip, TV drama (Erlend Mjømen Knudsen) and best sound design (Megaphon: Erling Rein and Petter Clausen). In Australia it was broadcast via SBS-TV from February 4, 2021.

== Plot ==
Jonas wants to live a quiet life in Slusvik, a small Norwegian town near the Swedish border. His wife Elin is a school teacher and her teenage daughter, Sofie, is bored and disgruntled. Jonas' neighbour, Geir, an insurance assessor proposes a business deal – blackmail people who have something to hide. Jonas suspects Geir wants to blackmail him and snaps Geir's neck. Jonas dismembers the body and buries it in the woods. While there he loses Sofie's pet cat, Kasper. The townspeople believe Geir abandoned his wife and ran off. Flashbacks show Jonas as Stefan: a criminal, his gang robs a security van. Stefan kills the driver and then his gang leader, Cato. Later he uses the money to buy a new identity from a shady organisation, Omega. In Slusvik Sofie has trouble with local bully Elisabeth: they fight. Meanwhile a nude teen girl's body is found in the town's sluice gate. After another fight with Elisabeth, Sofie joins the drama club to avoid expulsion from school. The drama club practices a play on the town's pioneer, Haakon.

Several months later Sofie still hunts the woods for Kasper and finds a bloodied running shoe, which belongs to the dead girl. Jonas fears a thorough search could find Geir's body parts, so he digs them up to take them to a factory. Another neighbour, William, sees Jonas and manipulates him to help interfere with local police looking into the dead girl. Marius, a national investigator, is dispatched to Slusvik to head the search for her killer. He stirs up the press and eventually focuses on William as fitting the profile of a psychopath. Jonas and William decide to divert the blame onto Adam, Sofie's drama teacher. Adam and the drama students hike to an isolated cabin for a weekend to focus on their play. Jonas had followed along and, heavily disguised, accosts Adam and accuses him of pedophilia. He warns Adam to leave the locals girls alone. Adam is distraught and becomes increasingly withdrawn. Jonas and William decide to kill Adam but make it look like suicide.

== Cast ==
- Thorbjørn Harr as Jonas Schulman/Stefan, former criminal, later a restaurant waiter (Note: Person listed by Geir as having gaps or inconsistencies in their background check.)
  - Kristoffer Joner was originally cast as Jonas but had to resign due to an injury.
- Andrea Bræin Hovig as Elin Müller Schulman, Løkkebakken High School teacher, Jonas' wife
- Ylva Fuglerud as Sofie Müller Schulman, student, Elin's teenage daughter, Jonas' step-daughter, her pet cat Kasper is missing
- Kyrre Hellum as Geir Gregersen, an insurance assessor, Jonas' neighbour, investigates locals he suspects of hiding something, killed by Jonas but officially assumed to have left town
- Sigurd Myhre as William Schmidtberger/Philip, former real estate embezzler, later a call centre worker, recent Slusvik arrival, coerces Jonas to help stall any murder investigation
- Janne Heltberg at Barbara, Elin's neighbour, married to Geir who disappears
- Benjamin Helstad as Adam Solvang/the Bag Man, drama teacher, folk singer-songwriter
- Alexandra Rapaport as Nina Novak/Alina, former abused wife of an Eastern European crime boss, later house-bound with obvious plastic surgery
- Ole Thore Hasseldal as Haakon Walter, historical figure, Slusvik pioneer, also an anti-Semite and misogynist
- Ingrid Bolsø Berdal as "Iris", works for Omega, interviews subjects prior to placement
- Silje Storstein as Vigdis Walter, Slusvik police, descendant of Haakon
- Marte Magnusdotter Solem as Lydia Bjerch-Andersen, Slusvik senior police, Vigdis' boss
- Nader Khademi as Kai Kolstad, local photographer-news reporter
- Johan Rheborg as Øystein Superbroa, restaurant owner, Jonas' boss
- Jenny Strøm Bjørntvedt as Elisabeth Kjeldsen, student, Sofie's bully and rival
- Henrik Dieter Stenholt as Niklas, student, bully who becomes Sofie's love interest
- Susanne Karin Moe as the dead girl, mid-teens Eastern European
- Kyrre Haugen Sydness as Ronald Lund, Slusvik mechanic, finds dead girl near the town's sluice gate
- Nicolai Cleve Broch as Marius Borge, National Crime Unit murder investigator, struggles to find the dead girl's killer, becomes Barbara's love interest
- Anneke von der Lippe as Henriette Maeir, veterinarian, blamed by Sofie for losing Kasper
- Bjørn Myrene as Kjell-Vidar Ormåsen, Christian, married to Beate, Ruben's dad
- Cecilie A. Mosli as Beate Ormåsen, Christian, married to Kjell-Vidar, Ruben's mom (Note: Mosli also directed three episodes.)
- Lene Marie Hegge as Wanda, student, drama club member
- Iselin Shumba Skjævesland as Amalie Melhus, Slusvik mayor, wants to maintain its image as the safest town in Scandinavia
- Stig Frode Henriksen as Cato, criminal gang leader, Stefan's boss, Natasja's boyfriend (Note: Henriksen also co-created and co-wrote the series.)
- Pihla Viitala as Natasja, criminal gang member, Cato's girlfriend, Stefan's secret lover
- Nina Woxholtt as Rannveig Didriksen, Løkkebakken school principal, places troublesome students into drama club

== Episode guide ==
No.	Title	Directed by	Written by	Original release date
1	"Kieler Street"	Patrik Syversen	Stig Frode Henriksen, Jesper Sundnes, Patrik Syversen	October 18, 2018
Jonas has breakfast with Elin and Sofie while they plan a backyard BBQ for tonight. Øystein orders Jonas to remain at work as he's leaving early for a Jørn Hoel concert. At school Sofie photographs Elisabeth stealing from fellow students, Elisabeth confronts her: they scuffle. At home, Elin admonishes Sofie for fighting, Sofie vents her anger over her mother's "proper and correct" façade. Jonas settles Sofie down, he then suggest taking Kasper to the vet, Henriette. Elin asks for ice cubes, hot dog rolls and extra chairs. Jonas borrows chairs from fellow recovering alcoholic, Geir. He learns that Geir has established a list of locals who have secret pasts and wants to blackmail them. Jonas snaps Geir's neck, hides the body but has no time for its disposal: he has errands to run. He tries to buy rolls but is thwarted. Jonas returns to Geir's home to pack a suitcase and passport, then takes Geir's body out to the woods. He dismembers it and buries the parts in different spots. He tries to give Kasper its medicine but it escapes. Jonas returns home late for the BBQ and meets new neighbour, William: they chat and Jonas gets drunk.
2	"Cat People"	Patrik Syversen	Stig Frode Henriksen, Jesper Sundnes, Patrik Syversen	October 25, 2018
Flashback (seven years earlier): Stefan (Jonas) meets "Iris", who works for Omega, which provides him a new identity. He is to keep a low profile and never contact anyone. He meets Henriette when moving into Slusvik. Current: Jonas sleeps off his drunken binge, Sofie vacuums nearby and warns Jonas of his weekend shift. Elin is cleaning up after the BBQ: she is pissed off at his drunkenness. He gets Henriette to cover for him by saying Kasper escaped. Lydia and Vigdis investigate vandalism of Haakon's monument. Flashback: Stefan is limping with two black bags, he steals a car and phones Omega for a "severance package." Current: Henriette tells Elin and Sofie how Kasper ran off. Sofie is not impressed and annoyed by Elin's conciliatory approach. Sofie creates flyers and inspires townsfolk to search for Kasper. William joins Jonas during the search and asks about his life. Elisabeth taunts Sofie. The search goes into the woods, Jonas is worried. He tells Sofie how he attacked a bully with a handful of keys. Jonas cracks Geir's computer's password: finding ≈ 30 files on local people, including Jonas. He copies the folder to a thumb drive and then deletes it from Geir's computer.
3	"One Minute of Silence"	Patrik Syversen	Stig Frode Henriksen, Jesper Sundnes, Patrik Syversen	November 1, 2018
A teen girl's body is found in the town's sluice. Mayor Amalie directs Lydia and Vigdis to treat it as a suicide and keep the town's image as Norway's safest town. Flashback: Stefan's gang plan a security van robbery. Current: Mysen-based pathologist determines the girl drowned 8-10 days earlier, her clothes were not found, there is dirt under fingernails. Vigdis wants to investigate further but is overruled by Lydia. Rannveig announces a minute's silence for the dead girl, Sofie's classmates miaow. Elisabeth taunts her and threatens retaliation if she shows incriminating photos. Sofie clutches her keys and punches Elisabeth's face. Rannveig and Adam put her into the drama club to relieve her frustrations. Jonas is worried that any investigation of the dead girl could uncover his own crime. Amalie coerces Kai into not running a story on the death. Flashback: Stefan and Cato are waiting in a car, nearby Chris and Natasja block the van. Its driver pushes Natasja, Stefan steps out and kills the driver. Current: Jonas steals a car, he returns to the woods and digs up Geir's body parts to dispose them at a factory. William is watching. Jonas feigns drunkenness upon returning home.
4	"The Legacy of Haakon Walter"	Patrik Syversen	Stig Frode Henriksen, Jesper Sundnes, Patrik Syversen	November 8, 2018
It is several months later: winter of a new year. Jonas attends an AA meeting and talks the talk. Sofie still searches for Kasper in the woods, where she finds a bloodied running shoe. Lydia and Vigdis believe it belongs to the dead girl, they find evidence of burnt clothes. Material is sent for forensic analysis. Kai speculates online about the shoe and links it to the dead girl: was she murdered? William tells Jonas about Kai's article and that he saw Jonas digging in the woods. Lydia and Vigdis question locals but none are forthcoming. Amalie is not pleased about their questioning locals or Kai's article. Adam praises Sofie on her progress in the drama club. They are due to put on a play, The Travels of Walter, in honour of Haakon, during the spring festival. Sofie still faces coldness from Elisabeth, Adam advises her to offer a reconciliatory treat. Police interview William; he points towards Geir's disappearance. They talk to Barbara, who tells them Geir was to ineffectual to murder anyone. Marius drives in Slusvik, already speculating on what he'll find and, being distracted, he collides with Haakon's memorial, toppling its head. Marius drives off.
5	"W Schmidtberger"	Patrik Syversen	Stig Frode Henriksen, Jesper Sundnes, Patrik Syversen	November 15, 2018
Flashback: Philip (William) is tortured by Richard and Ewan to reveal the whereabouts of 40 million Euros, which he had embezzled. He denies knowing where it is, Ewan fires a nail-gun into Philip's hand, fixing it to the bench. Philip passes out. Current: Marius calls a town meeting over the bloodied shoe but townsfolk want to know about the vandalism of Haakon's statue. Marius brags about his experience in solving crimes but they decide to set up a neighbourhood patrol to prevent further vandalism. While on patrol William tells Jonas he saw him dig up something big in the woods. William coerces him to help get rid of Marius. Flashback: Philip wakes, he forces the nail out and frees himself. Philip fights Richard and then Ewan. He kills both of them and then he drives away in their car. He goes to Omega and gets a new identity. Current: Jonas and William spy on Adam in his home before running off. They find a frozen cat and disguise it to resemble Kasper, to stop Sofie's searches. Ormåsens' son, Ruben cycles past, William throws a stick at him and the boy is injured. Jonas takes the fake Kasper home.
6	"Indulgence Trading"	Patrik Syversen	Stig Frode Henriksen, Jesper Sundnes, Patrik Syversen	November 22, 2018
William apologises to the Ormåsens for the injury to Ruben. He agrees to pay an indulgence of 40000 kroner if they do not involve police. William tells Jonas they asked for 90000: each to pay half. Jonas' family hold Kasper's vigil, the cat is buried. Sofie swears revenge for Kasper's death. Elin praises Adam's work with Sofie, who has become more mature and accepting. Marius struggles with his investigation of the dead girl, he is abrasive and insulting to local people. Believing she committed suicide, they are more interested in Haakon's vandalism. Vigdis and Lydia hope to solve dead girl's case without Marius. Sofie vandalises Henriette's bike and smashes her window. Ronald is on neighbourhood patrol and releases his dog after the vandal. Sofie escapes but is injured and limps to Adam's place. Jonas and Elin discuss Adam, Elin praises his work with students. Jonas reads Adam's file from Geir's background check. Sofie gets her twisted ankle treated by Adam, the pair is photographed by Ronald who sends the image to Jonas. When Sofie returns she lies over her whereabouts. Kai prints an article on Marius' ineffectual investigation, Marius organises a press conference asking national press to attend.
7	"Novak"	Patrik Syversen, Cecilie A. Mosli	Stig Frode Henriksen, Jesper Sundnes, Patrik Syversen	November 29, 2018
Marius claims police have leads but does not reveal any. He aims to shake up townsfolk. Flashback: Alina (Nina) is threatened by her husband if she runs off again: he will kill her and the children. Current: Jonas gives William his first indulgence payment: clearing out his wife's account. Niklas breaks up with Elisabeth: she's too clingy. William needles Jonas over Adam and Sofie's evening meeting. Media film in Kieler Street, Nina stumbles on the snowy roadside: the video becomes popular. Flashback: Alina begs her unsympathetic mother for help: she's told to put up with the domestic violence. Current: Sofie and Niklas use fake names during a radio interview. They claim police arrested Rannveig. Nina hides in fear when Marius knocks. Flashback: Alina connects a hose to her car exhaust with herself and children inside. She coughs awake: the children are dead. Current: Rannveig recognised Sofie's and Niklas' voices. Niklas takes the blame, Sofie suggests the drama club to raise his empathy. Elin's debit cards are declined. Jonas sees Marius entering Barbara's house for an interview. Jonas tells Elin about Sofie lying and meeting Adam. Flashback: "Iris" agrees to relocate Alina. Current: Nina disappears after a black car drives by.
8	"The Bag Man"	Patrik Syversen, Cecilie A. Mosli	Stig Frode Henriksen, Jesper Sundnes, Patrik Syversen	December 6, 2018
Flashback: Natasja is pregnant to Stefan and fears Cato will kill her if he finds out. Current: Jonas uses Geir's file on Adam. An image search leads to a possible identity, "The Bag Man", a suspected pedophile. Adam, Elin, Sofie and drama students hike to Haakon's cabin. Marius calls on Jonas, who claims to be content with his mundane life in Slusvik. Flashback: Natasja tells Stefan about Omega, which would relocate them. They plan to kill Cato and run off with all the money. Current: Adam admits to Elin that he does not have a teaching degree but took drama classes. He tells students a scary story about a witch eating children. Flashback: after the heist Cato kills fellow gang member, Chris. Natasja drives them in a van, Stefan is worried he'll be next. He fights Cato, a gun goes off killing Natasja. Cato injures Stefan in his side but is killed in self-defence. Stefan limps off with the money. Current: Jonas, heavily disguised, attacks Adam outside the cabin. He calls him a pedophile and "The Bag Man". Adam is warned to leave local girls alone. Adam is shattered and on the return trip he is distant and unfocused.
9	"So There You Are, Stuck in Freedom"	Cecilie A. Mosli	Stig Frode Henriksen, Jesper Sundnes, Patrik Syversen	December 13, 2018
Jonas dreams of Geir and apologises for killing him. When he wakes he assures Elin he can still be trusted. Nina has disappeared, Vigdis tells Marius she had relatives in Sweden. Marius is frustrated with no leads. Needing money Jonas sells his almost new mower. Adam ignores Sofie at school. Marius decides to focus on William and brings him in for questioning. William fends off Marius who becomes irritated and tells off Vigdis for her poor work. She expels him from the police station. William tells Jonas that Marius is looking into Nina's disappearance. Geir's file queries her backstory: is she Eastern European? Drama practice proceeds with minimal input from Adam, Niklas is making up lines. Sofie follows Adam into the corridor and asks want happened to him on the trip. Fellow teacher, Hilde sees them arguing and reports to Rannveig. Rannveig interviews Adam and Hilde; Adam becomes verbally aggressive and insults both. He is fired and storms off abusing other staff and students. Elin tells Jonas about Adam being fired and "something happened on the trip". Jonas and William plan to shift the blame for the dead girl onto Adam after killing him and making it look like suicide.
10	"Finale"	Patrik Syversen	Stig Frode Henriksen, Jesper Sundnes, Patrik Syversen	December 20, 2018
William buys underage porn from Kalle's shop. Elin takes over the drama play for the Slusvik festival letting students direct themselves. Marius and Barbara are lovers. Sofie is not happy with Adam's dismissal and leaves the drama club. William composes a fake suicide note to frame Adam. Marius searches William's place, who admits to owning a hunting rifle without a license. The play has Wanda taking over Sofie's role. Jonas and William break into Adam's place: they find he has killed himself in the bathroom. They replace his note with the fake and leave the underage porn. Sofie arrives looking for Adam; she finds his dead body and suicide note. She phones the police while Jonas and William escape. Sofie returns to the festival. Vigdis and Lydia read the fake note to Marius claiming they were already investigating Adam for the girl's murder. Kjell-Vidar tells Jonas the indulgence was only 40000 kroner. Jonas invites William to celebrate and questions him about the amount: was it 90000 or 40000? They fight; Jonas is stabbed in the leg and shoulder. Elin arrives and attacks William, killing him. She says, "we have to clean this up before Sofie gets home."
