= Dome 16 =

Norwegian science fiction television series

- Also known as: no:Kuppel 16, sv:Kupol 16
- Genre: Science fiction
- Created by: Thomas Seeberg Torjussen
- Screenplay by: Thomas Seeberg Torjussen
- Directed by: Thomas Seeberg Torjussen, Daniel Voldheim
- Starring: Johannes Blumenthal; Flo Fagerli; Edith Haagenrud-Sande; Alma Bargee Ramberg; Julian Johannes Stormyhr-Tornello
- Music by: John Erik Kaada
- Country of origin: Norway
- Original language: Norwegian
- No. of seasons: 1
- No. of episodes: 10

Production
- Running time: 19–24 min.
- Production company: Tordenfilm

Original release
- Network: NRK1
- Release: 4 November 2022

Dome 16 or Kuppel 16 is a Norwegian dystopian, science fiction television series, which was broadcast from 4 November 2022 via NRK1. It was created by Thomas Seeberg Torjussen who also wrote the script and co-directed its ten episodes with Daniel Voldheim. Dome 16 is set in Oslo about 120 years in the future, where most inhabitants live in separate domes to protect themselves from pandemics, extreme weather, pollution and social unrest. 16-year-old Anton (Johannes Blumenthal) escapes from his dome and meets Emma (Flo Fagerli) also 16, who lives outside the domes. The series won three categories at Gullruten 2023: Green Production of the Year, Best VFX and Best Lighting Design.

== Premise ==
In 2040 an ecological collapse occurs, Oslo residents create numerous domes, where some survivors live. They are protected from pollution, pandemics, extreme weather and social unrest. The rest of the population remains outside the domes; having impoverished lives with squalid housing and numerous health risks. About 100 years later, Anton, becomes curious about females. However, Haven (or Dome 16) is strictly monitored via AI. Anton sneaks into the air conditioning tunnels and becomes a voyeur above female guest workers' showers. He falls in on an outsider, Emma, who punches him out. Anton and his family are shamed by his actions. Emma's mother, Unn negotiates for compensatory payment. Unn and Emma return to their clan's compound. Unn hopes to purchase expensive medication, Proxyrat for the clan's emphysema sufferers, including Emma's friend Thea. Anton is shunned by most Haven residents, except his friend Sam.

Emma approaches activist group, 99% and exaggerates her ordeal as attempted rape. She identifies Anton as her assailant. Unn tells Emma that Haven will pay them compensation on the proviso of no mention of Anton's indiscretion. Emma tries to convince 99% she had been mistaken. However, Anton, who had escaped from Haven, has been captured. Anton confirms he saw Emma in the shower and had come to apologise. 99%'s leadership wish to extort a greater amount for Anton's return. Emma rescues Anton and, at risk to herself, takes him beyond 99%'s grasp. They bond over their adventures together. Haven security recover Anton, while Emma returns to her clan. Haven refuses to pay compensation as their reputation has been severely tarnished. Both Anton and Emma are scolded by their respective families and feel everyone hates them. Anton's classmate Frida shows him a hideout where he stays alone. Emma's family receives death threats from neighbouring clans, hence Emma runs away.

Anton is advised by his ancestor, Sveinung to follow his heart. Consequently, he steals medication, Proxyrat, which treats emphysema. With help from Sam and Frida, Anton sends the Proxyrat to Thea's parents. Anton directs Emma to enter Haven via air conditioning ducts. They share his hideout. Emma befriends Frida, who shows her around Haven. An alarm sounds indicating an unauthorised entrant. Anton and Emma try evading security, but are caught. Another ancestor, Ingunn catches a viral infection and dies. Sveinung describes how Ingunn had planned to leave Haven and die, before she succumbed to dementia. Anton discovers Ingunn's key, which leads to a storage lock-up and a vintage car. He drives to Emma's clan lands, where Thea helps him visit Emma.

== Cast and characters ==
=== Main cast ===
- Johannes Blumenthal as Anton Johansen-Wiig: Haven Dome resident
- Flo Fagerli as Emma: outside resident, Unn's daughter, Thea's friend, entertainers clan
- Edith Haagenrud-Sande as Frida: Anton's classmate, becomes friends with Sam
- Julian Johannes Stormyhr-Tornello as Sam: Anton's best friend, works at capsule transport room
- Alma Bargee Ramberg as Thea: Emma's best friend, has emphysema
- Terje Strømdahl as Sveinung Johansen-Wiig: Anton's 158-year-old great-great-grandfather, former government's minister and climate change denier, whose policies led to 2040 ecological collapse
- Silje Storstein as Lovise: Anton's mother
- Henrik Rafaelsen as Bjørn: Emma's father, Unn's husband
- Andrea Bræin Hovig as Unn: Emma's mother, Bjørn's wife, works as cook in Haven
- Kim Falck as Sturla: Anton's father

=== Recurring cast ===
- Marit Opsahl Grefberg as Tiepoldemor: Anton's great-great-grandmother
- Janny Hoff Brekke as Ingunn Sundelin: Anton's 155-year-old great-great-grandmother, former hip-hop artist
- Sigurd Myhre as Roy (voice only): Anton's room robot
- Jon Erling Wevling as Bakgårdsvakt (English: "Back garden, guard): Emma's clan security
- Marit Østbye as Oldemor: Anton's great-grandmother
- Yusuf Toosh Ibra as Lærer (English: "Teacher"): Anton's classroom instructor
- Hilde Olausson as Britt Solvang: Haven's supreme council's leader
- Bendu Dorcas Hammervold as Sika: leader of anti-dome outsider activists, 99% group
- Tone Johnsen as Looty (voice only) / Tjuvgods (English: "Stolen goods") (voice only): Haven School Assistant robot / taken items AI

== Episode guide ==
No. in season	Title	Directed by	Written by	Original release date
1	"Just Wanted to See a Boob" (Ville bare se en pupp)	Thomas Seeberg Torjussen	Thomas Seeberg Torjussen, Daniel Voldheim	3 November 2022
Inside Haven Dome, Anton sits on his bed. Roy relays a message from Sam, who's bored. Anton reviews a documentary on the 2040 ecological collapse, directs the camera to a beach scene and zooms in towards a woman's naked breast. Soon the woman wears a bikini top. Lovise asks Anton to get up. He sits in communal room surrounded by extended family. Outside the domes, Emma and Thea sit on a bench alongside a building. Unn asks Emma to get ready to join her as a cook in Haven. Anton talks with his elders, then leaves to assist Sam. Sam and Anton package small items for transit via capsule to outsiders. Anton complains about censorship, which prevented his seeing naked breast. Sam points to ladder and tells Anton he can see boobs in the guest workers' showers. Supervisor thanks Anton for helping Sam. Emma and Unn are masked, travelling by high-speed train. Later, they reach Haven. Anton climbs the ladder to an access-way above workers' shower rooms. Emma and Unn are tested for infections: they pass inside. Anton observes naked Emma showering. He leans forward, falls through the ceiling to land at Emma's feet, who knocks out Anton.
2	"The Shame" (Du ville ikke gjort noe sånt du, Anton)	Thomas Seeberg Torjussen	Thomas Seeberg Torjussen, Daniel Voldheim	3 November 2022
Anton lies on a hospital bed with a band-aid across his nose. Britt enters, calls Anton an idiot. Emma's attended by three doctors to remove a scratch. Unn advises Emma to over-react about her experience to receive greater compensation. Britt apologises to Emma and Unn for Anton's actions, which brought shame upon all Haven. Emma refuses to have freckles removed, but requests a lung cleanse. Lovise and the family castigate Anton for insulting outsider's clan – they may demand unaffordable compensation. Sveinung consoles Anton: life will improve. Sveinung: Emma's clan descended from entertainers; will accept compensation. Emma accompanies Thea, who struggles breathing. Emma leaves her bedroom by window. Sam via video call: people claim you raped four women. Anton: stay in bedroom forever. Emma walks across town to 99% headquarters. She relates her experiences in Haven. Sika to Emma: ask to have Anton extradited. Sturla to Anton: must return to school. Anton: everyone hates me. Teacher explains to students how domes were constructed to protect elite groups from ecological collapse, while outsiders formed like-minded clans. Sam to Teacher: Anton is at home? Teacher: he left. Sika wakes Emma, who meets others. They identify Anton. Anton escapes Haven inside delivery capsule.
3	"Ransom" (Jeg hater deg)	Thomas Seeberg Torjussen	Thomas Seeberg Torjussen, Daniel Voldheim	3 November 2022
Anton arrives at capsule terminal; he is surrounded by residents, who back away. Anton runs from building, finds spot to rest, and removes his breather mask. He encounters squalid and putrid surroundings. Anton passes homeless people living on footpath. Unn and Bjørn make their deal with Haven’s lawyers without consulting Emma. Emma's offended. Sika's team discover Anton and save him from being attacked by homeless woman. Team pass hungry children. Bjørn apologises to Emma, but explains they needed the money to treat Thea's and others' emphysema. Payment is conditional on their not revealing what happened in Haven. Team member challenges Anton to eat their staple diet, which tastes horrible. He identifies Anton; knows what he did in Haven. Emma tries to convince Sika and team that she wrongly identified Anton. Sika brings Emma to Anton, who confirms that he spied upon her. Anton apologises to Emma, but Sika promises that 99% will not return Anton without considerable financial reward. Emma rails against Sika using Anton to extort money from Anton's family. Emma's grabbed by team member, told to be quiet. They lock Emma and Anton in separate rooms. Emma gets out through her skylight; she kicks open Anton's skylight.
4	"Wild Horses" (Kosmisk angst)	Thomas Seeberg Torjussen	Thomas Seeberg Torjussen, Daniel Voldheim	10 November 2022
Emma and Anton run across rooves and then climb down spiral staircase at end of final building. They hide from pursuers. News reports describe Anton as a rapist and call for Sveinung to be investigated by Planetary Commission for causing ecological collapse. Emma steals a motorcycle and with Anton onboard, they ride out of town across the devastated countryside: no-man's-land. The motorcycle stops under AI control, its been reported stolen. AI orders them to dismount; Emma's parents will be fined. Motorcycle returns to town. Neither Anton nor Emma knows the way to Haven. They enter an abandoned farmhouse. They drink water from an old bottle. A herd of horses gallop past. Anton vomits from the tainted water. The pair returns to the road where Emma and Anton stop in front of an AI-controlled Global-owned road train. AI hands over to Global employee, who contacts his manager. Manager orders road train to drop an emergency aid package and alerts Haven security. Anton and Emma beside road, with blankets, food and water. Emma recalls clan belief in a Twin Planet, which had an Exodus to it. Anton's picked up by Haven security, while Emma returns to town with a clan motorcyclist.
5	"Montagues and Capulets" (Trivselen og Trygghetsfølelsen)	Thomas Seeberg Torjussen	Thomas Seeberg Torjussen, Daniel Voldheim	10 November 2022
Various doctors treat Anton for possible infections or injuries. Emma's told off by her parents for leaving clan. Anton's told off by his whole family. Anton asks Roy to display Emma's photo on his wall. Emma's reviled by clan for letting Anton escape. Most believe Anton's family will not pay compensation, now. Thea reconciles with Emma, who reveals Anton claimed he would pay. Emma relates her experiences to Thea. Britt welcomes Anton back, but refuses to pay Emma's clan due to the embarrassment they now face. Thea teases Emma about liking Anton. Sika orders Unn to send Emma away as all neighbourhood hates her now. Unn refuses and orders Sika off clan's land. Anton returns to class, Teacher listens to students describing their discomfort with Anton's presence because he disrespected women. Teacher responds: Anton regrets his actions, vowed not to repeat them. Almost all girls want Anton to avert his gaze from them. Anton leaves schoolroom. Frida catches up with Anton. She points to hatch, which leads to air ducts, where he could hide. Unn and Bjørn argue over Emma's safety. Frida leads Anton to her hideout; demonstrates Looty's commands. Emma runs away to save her parents from harm.
6	"A Way In" (Kan ikke gjøre ingenting)	Thomas Seeberg Torjussen	Thomas Seeberg Torjussen, Daniel Voldheim	17 November 2022
Emma travels atop AI-directed road train's roof. Anton sees a storm beyond his dome. Sveinung discovers Anton and they confer. The storm reaches Emma; she becomes soaked. When her road train stops, Emma disembarks, walks onwards. Sveinung: cannot pay Emma because Haven council have decided she belongs to 99% terrorists. Anton realises he must do something on his own, but cannot determine what to do. He swears "caonima" in frustration. Emma re-enters the abandoned farmhouse, lies on the floor. After considering his options, Anton finally decides to phone Emma. He explains how Sveinung's money is frozen, but promises to help Emma. They describe their respective situations. Anton realises Emma is at the farmhouse, which they had previously visited. Emma explains that she ran away because everyone hates her and her family's in danger. Looty provides directions from the farmhouse to Haven. Anton walks through air ducts to Haven's wall vent. Anton asks Emma whether she wants to hide in Haven. She agrees if Anton provides medication: Proxyrat. He agrees and gives her directions. After Emma arrives at the vent, Anton leads her to air ducts. An alarm sounds, gas is released: Emma falls asleep. Anton drags her further.
7	"What's Eating Anton Johnsen Wiig" (Ei lita truse)	Thomas Seeberg Torjussen	Thomas Seeberg Torjussen, Daniel Voldheim	17 November 2022
Emma coughs, wakes alongside Anton in air ducts. Anton leads her to hideout. He leaves to return to home. Anton ignores his parents. Emma changes clothes, eats. Anton selects Emma's fresh clothes. Lovise, Sturla lock their front door until Anton provides answers. Anton cannot forgive them for not helping Emma after saving his life. Lovise called a puberty specialist. Emma requests Proxyrat from Looty, which it cannot supply. She hears noise nearby and hides. Frida enters, lies on couch. Specialist asks for Anton's bag: Anton refuses. Lovise hands it over. Specialist sees women's underwear, deduces Anton is exploring sexuality. Frida dances to Looty's music; backs into Emma. Frida learns Anton helped Emma inside, who has nowhere else. Frida disguises Emma, has her pose as Pernille. Specialist explains to classmates: Anton is exploring their gender identity. Sam to Anton: no way, Lovise fabricated it so Anton is accepted by classmates. Anton confesses: he brought Emma inside dome. Frida to Emma: Anton has improved his consideration since meeting Emma. Anton steals boxes of Proxyrat. Frida takes Emma home, but Frida's father, Jon is there. Jon doubts Pernille's story. Anton returns to the hideout but cannot find Emma; notices Frida was there.
8	"The Kiss and the Terror" (Emma liker deg ikke, Anton)	Thomas Seeberg Torjussen	Thomas Seeberg Torjussen, Daniel Voldheim	24 November 2022
Jon starts talking trash about Haven dwellers and outsiders. Frida takes Emma aside, but Jon calls Frida back. Emma leaves. Anton asks Roy to phone Anton. Jon wallows in self-pity, starts to rant when Frida wants to leave Haven. Emma returns to hideout. Frida answers Anton: Emma does not like you. Lovise disapproves of Anton visiting Frida. Anton berates Emma for leaving hideout and putting herself in danger. Emma: do not think you are creepy. They kiss each other. Anton shows Emma the stolen Proxyrat. Emma: Frida needs help. Britta announces: unauthorised persons have entered Haven. Lovise wants to bring Anton back. Family argues about best response. Roy hovers near Ingunn. Anton plans to send Proxyrat to Thea. Drone hovers into air duct; Anton and Emma hide. They learn guards are posted at capsule delivery station. An alert sounds, guards leave to investigate. Emma and Anton address package to Thea's parents. Anton sends it. He tells Emma his purpose is to help her. Frida discovers Anton and Emma kissing. Frida: there is an infection in Haven. She warns Emma to get away before she is caught. A drone finds Anton and Emma, starts alert. Thea receives Proxyrat, with Emma's necklace.
9	"Anton, You Idiot" (Ingen skal dø)	Thomas Seeberg Torjussen	Thomas Seeberg Torjussen, Daniel Voldheim	24 November 2022
Anton's brought before Britt and his entire family. Britt rails against his recent actions. Emma returns to her clan, embraces Thea, who wears Emma's necklace. Lovise is ashamed of Anton. Sturla realises girl's clothes were for Emma; Anton faked having gender identity crisis. Unn explains how other outsiders, using drones, had followed Emma into Haven. Unn has signed a non-disclosure agreement with Haven's lawyers for a small compensation. Haven lawyers were unaware that Anton had stolen Proxyrat. Lovise: Anton under strictest parental control. Sam and Frida are also punished for helping. Sturla: no contact with Frida, who lied and stole items. Lovise: Ingunn caught virus. Ingunn dies. Sveinung to Anton: Ingunn wanted to die decades ago, but she was prevented. She had a special key, but forgot it due to dementia. Sveinung: Ingunn is at peace. He asks Anton to accompany him to the Planetary Commission. At school, no-one talks to Anton. Sveinung pleads guilty and asks for exile, outside. Commission leader concludes Sveinung has dementia. Emma uses video footage to observe Anton. Unn to Emma: there is no future for you and Anton. Lovise agrees Anton can have a memento of Ingunn. Anton collects Ingunn's key and photo.
10	"A Place for Us" (Exodus)	Thomas Seeberg Torjussen	Thomas Seeberg Torjussen, Daniel Voldheim	1 December 2022
Anton visits Sam and Frida, who are now friends. He tells them he plans to leave Haven, find Emma. Sam and Frida say goodbye to Anton. Sam walks past capsule guard, Frida runs after and starts fighting Sam. Guard runs over as Anton escapes via capsule. He gets out near Emma's clan. Emma is in dance class and learns that Anton has run away; she looks for him. Emma to Unn: did not help Anton escape. Anton follows Ingunn's directions. Emma waits for news about Anton. Anton approaches Voy Storage, where storeman, Jan remembers Ingunn as "Bootylicious". Jan minds Haven dwellers' cherished items despite claiming they own nothing. Jan helps Anton make plans. Thea consoles Emma, when Anton has not appeared all day. Thea disbelieves Emma pretence that she does not care. Jan advises Anton: travel to coastal residence; lay low for weeks then get Emma. Ingunn's car drives Anton towards Emma's clan zone. Thea sees Anton from window; she meets Anton. Thea describes how to evade guards and find Emma. Anton tells Emma he wants to belong to her. Anton invites Emma to stay at coastal residence. Emma says goodbye to Thea. Anton and Emma travel by car.
