= A Cry in the Woods =

- Den som frykter ulven
- Directed by: Erich Hörtnagl
- Written by: Stefan Ahnhem; Karin Fossum (novel)
- Starring: Lars Bom; Laila Goody; Stig Henrik Hoff; Kristoffer Joner; Aksel Hennie
- Release date: 2 April 2004
- Running time: 97 minutes
- Country: Norway
- Languages: Norwegian, Danish

A Cry in the Woods (Norwegian: Den som frykter ulven) is a 2004 Norwegian crime film directed by Erich Hörtnagl, starring Lars Bom, Kristoffer Joner, Laila Goody and Stig Henrik Hoff. When an old lady is brutally murdered, suspicion falls on the escaped mental patient Erkki Jorma (Joner). Only his therapist Sara Rask (Goody) believes that he is innocent, and works with investigator Karsten Skov (Bom) to track down Erkki. Erkki, however, has in the meanwhile been taken hostage by bank robber Morgan (Hoff), whose plan for a perfect getaway is sabotaged when his hostage refuses to leave.
