= Nordic Council Film Prize =

Annual film prize

The Nordic Council Film Prize is an annual film prize administered by the Nordic Council since 2002. The Nordisk Film & TV Fond is the funding body that administers the prize, and also awards the Nordic Series Awards, since 2017.

== History ==
The first award was handed out in 2002 to celebrate the Nordic Council's 50th anniversary. Since 2005 the prize has been annual.

In 2023, Greenland submitted a film for the first time with The Edge Of The Shadow, directed by Malik Kleist.

In 2025, a film produced in the Faroe Islands was nominated for the first time.

== Description ==
The statutes of the award came into effect in 2003 and were amended in 2007, 2009, 2011, and 2016. The award is given to a film deeply rooted in Nordic culture, it is shared between the film's director, scriptwriter and producer, underlining the fact that film as an art form is the result of a close collaboration between these three main functions. The award includes a cash prize of DKK 300,000 ($40,000).

The Nordic Council Film Prize is administered by the Nordisk Film & TV Fond, a secretariat to the Nordic Council. The Fond is funded by 22 partners: the Nordic Council of Ministers; five national film institutes; and 16 public and private media companies. It also funds the Nordisk Film & TV Fond Prize at the annual Gothenburg Film Festival.

One winner is chosen from submissions from the five Nordic countries. Requirements for films entering the competition are: duration of at least 72 minutes, Nordic production, high artistic quality, recent premiere, the film's main language should be Nordic. According to the Nordic Council, the prize is given for "the creation of an artistically original film that is rooted in Nordic cultural circles".

== Nordic Series Awards ==
In addition, since 2017 the Nordic Council has awarded the annual Nordic Series Awards, presented at TV Drama Vision in Göteborg, Sweden. These comprise:

- The Nordic Series Script Award, which recognises outstanding screenwriting in Nordic drama, the successor to the Nordisk Film & TV Fond Prize
- The Creative Courage Award, introduced in 2025, recognises "the producer(s) and the commissioner(s) of a series that exemplifies bold, innovative, and risk-taking approaches in Nordic drama series".

== Prize winners and nominees ==
Prize Winner

Year	English Title	Original Title	Director(s)	Submitting country
2002	The Man Without a Past	Mies vailla menneisyyttä	Aki Kaurismäki	Finland
2002	All About My Father	Alt om min far	Even Benestad	Norway
2002	Cleaning up!		Rostislav Aalto	Finland
2002	Open Hearts	Elsker dig for evigt	Susanne Bier	Denmark
2002	The Sea	Hafið	Baltasar Kormákur	Iceland
2002	Days Like This	Leva livet	Mikael Håfström	Sweden
2002	Lilya 4-ever		Lukas Moodysson	Sweden
2002	The Seagull's Laughter	Mávahlátur	Ágúst Guðmundsson	Iceland
2002	Music for Weddings and Funerals	Musikk for bryllup og begravelser	Unni Straume	Norway
2002	Okay		Jesper W. Nielsen	Denmark
2005	Manslaughter	Drabet	Per Fly	Denmark
2005	Pusher II: With Blood on My Hands		Nicolas Winding Refn	Denmark
2005	Frozen Land	Paha Maa	Aku Louhimies	Finland
2005	The 3 Rooms of Melancholia	Melancholian 3 huonetta	Pirjo Honkasalo	Finland
2005	Screaming Masterpiece	Gargandi Snilld	Ari Alexander Ergis Magnússon	Iceland
2005	Dis (2004 film)		Silja Hauksdóttir	Iceland
2005	Kissed by Winter	Vinterkyss	Sara Johnsen	Norway
2005	Hawaii, Oslo		Erik Poppe	Norway
2005	The Guitar Mongoloid	Gitarrmongot	Ruben Östlund	Sweden
2005	A Hole in My Heart	Hål i mitt hjärta	Lukas Moodysson	Sweden
2006	Zozo		Josef Fares	Sweden
2006	After the Wedding	Efter bryllupet	Susanne Bier	Denmark
2006	Offscreen		Christoffer Boe	Denmark
2006	Revolution	Kenen joukoissa seisot	Jouko Aaltonen	Finland
2006	Mother of Mine	Äideistä parhain	Klaus Härö	Finland
2006	Thicker Than Water	Blóðbönd	Árni Ásgeirsson	Iceland
2006	A Little Trip to Heaven		Baltasar Kormákur	Iceland
2006	Free Jimmy	Slipp Jimmy fri	Christopher Nielsen	Norway
2006	The Bothersome Man	Den brysomme mannen	Jens Lien	Norway
2006	Mouth to Mouth	Mun mot mun	Björn Runge	Sweden
2007	The Art of Crying	Kunsten at Græde i Kor	Peter Schønau Fog	Denmark
2007	AFR		Morten Hartz Kaplers	Denmark
2007	A Man's Work	Miehen työ	Aleksi Salmenperä	Finland
2007	Children	Börn	Ragnar Bragason	Iceland
2007	Jar City	Mýrin	Baltasar Kormákur	Iceland
2007	Reprise		Joachim Trier	Norway
2007	Sons	Sønner	Erik Richter Strand	Norway
2007	Falkenberg Farewell	Farväl Falkenberg	Jesper Ganslandt	Sweden
2007	Darling		Johan Kling	Sweden
2008	You, the Living	Du levande	Roy Andersson	Sweden
2008	The Early Years: Erik Nietzsche Part 1	De unge år – Erik Nietzsche Del 1	Jacob Thuesen	Denmark
2008	The Home of Dark Butterflies	Tummien perhosten koti	Dome Karukoski	Finland
2008	White Night Wedding	Brúðguminn	Baltasar Kormákur	Iceland
2008	The Man Who Loved Yngve	Mannen som elsket Yngve	Stian Kristiansen	Norway
2009	Antichrist		Lars von Trier	Denmark
2009	Sauna		Antti-Jussi Annila	Finland
2009	The Amazing Truth About Queen Raquela		Olaf de Fleur Johannesson	Iceland
2009	North	Nord	Rune Denstad Langlo	Norway
2009	Light Year	Ljusår	Mikael Kristersson	Sweden
2010	Submarino		Thomas Vinterberg	Denmark
2010	Steam of Life	Miesten vuoro	Joonas Berghäll and Mika Hotakainen	Finland
2010	The Good Heart		Dagur Kári	Iceland
2010	Upperdog		Sara Johnsen	Norway
2010	Metropia		Tarik Saleh	Sweden
2011	Beyond	Svinalängorna	Pernilla August	Sweden
2011	Truth About Men	Sandheden om mænd	Nikolaj Arcel	Denmark
2011	The Good Son	Hyvä poika	Zaida Bergroth	Finland
2011	Undercurrent	Brim	Árni Ólafur Ásgeirsson	Iceland
2011	Oslo, August 31st	Oslo, 31. August	Joachim Trier	Norway
2012	Play		Ruben Östlund	Sweden
2012	A Royal Affair	En kongelig affære	Nikolaj Arcel	Denmark
2012	The Punk Syndrome	Kovasikajuttu	Jukka Kärkkäinen and J-P Passi	Finland
2012	Either Way	Á annan veg	Hafsteinn Gunnar Sigurdsson	Iceland
2012	The Orheim Company	Kompani Orheim	Arlid Andersen	Norway
2013	The Hunt	Jagten	Thomas Vinterberg	Denmark
2013	Open Up to Me	Kerron sinulle kaiken	Simo Halinen	Finland
2013	The Deep	Djúpið	Baltasar Kormákur	Iceland
2013	I Belong	Som du ser meg	Dag Johan Haugerud	Norway
2013	Eat Sleep Die	Äta sova dö	Gabriela Pichler	Sweden
2014	Of Horses and Men	Hross í oss	Benedikt Erlingsson	Iceland
2014	Nymphomaniac	Nymphomaniac	Lars von Trier	Denmark
2014	Concrete Night	Betoniyö	Pirjo Honkasalo	Finland
2014	Blind	Blind	Eskil Vogt	Norway
2014	Force Majeure	Turist	Ruben Östlund	Sweden
2015	Virgin Mountain	Fúsi	Dagur Kári	Iceland
2015	Silent Heart	Stille hjerte	Bille August	Denmark
2015	They Have Escaped	He ovat paenneet	Jukka-Pekka Valkeapää	Finland
2015	Out of Nature	Mot naturen	Ole Giæver	Norway
2015	Gentlemen	Gentlemen	Mikael Marcimain	Sweden
2016	Louder Than Bombs		Joachim Trier	Norway
2016	Land of Mine	Under sandet	Martin Zandvliet	Denmark
2016	The Happiest Day in the Life of Olli Mäki	Hymyilevä mies	Juho Kuosmanen	Finland
2016	Sparrows	Þrestir	Rúnar Rúnarsson	Iceland
2016	The Here After	Efterskalv	Magnus von Horn	Sweden
2017	Little Wing	Tyttö nimeltä Varpu	Selma Vilhunen	Finland
2017	Parents	Forældre	Christian Tafdrup	Denmark
2017	Heartstone	Hjartasteinn	Guðmundur Arnar Guðmundsson	Iceland
2017	Hunting Flies	Fluefangeren	Izer Aliu	Norway
2017	Sami Blood	Sameblod	Amanda Kernell	Sweden
2018	Woman at War	Kona fer í stríð	Benedikt Erlingsson	Iceland
2018	Winter Brothers	Vinterbrødre	Hlynur Pálmason	Denmark
2018	Euthanizer	Armomurhaaja	Teemu Nikki	Finland
2018	Thelma		Joachim Trier	Norway
2018	Ravens	Korparna	Jens Assur	Sweden
2019	Queen of Hearts	Dronningen	May el-Toukhy	Denmark
2019	Aurora		Miia Tervo	Finland
2019	A White, White Day	Hvítur, hvítur dagur	Hlynur Pálmason	Iceland
2019	Blind Spot	Blindsone	Tuva Novotny	Norway
2019	Reconstructing Utøya	Rekonstruktion Utøya	Carl Javér	Sweden
2020	Beware of Children	Barn	Dag Johan Haugerud	Norway
2020	Uncle	Onkel	René Frelle Petersen	Denmark
2020	Dogs Don't Wear Pants	Koirat eivät käytä housuja	J-P Valkeapää	Finland
2020	Echo	Bergmál	Rúnar Rúnarsson	Iceland
2020	Charter		Amanda Kernell	Sweden
2021	Flee		Jonas Poher Rasmussen	Denmark
2021	Any Day Now	Ensilumi	Hamy Ramezan	Finland
2021	Alma		Kristín Jóhannesdóttir	Iceland
2021	Gunda		Viktor Kossakovsky	Norway
2021	Tigers	Tigrar	Ronnie Sandahl	Sweden
2022	Lamb	Dýrið	Valdimar Jóhannsson	Iceland
2022	The Blind Man Who Did Not Want to See Titanic	Sokea mies joka ei halunnut nähdä Titanicia	Teemu Nikki	Finland
2022	Clara Sola		Nathalie Álvarez Mesén	Sweden
2022	Godland	Vanskabte Land/Volaða land	Hlynur Pálmason	Denmark
2022	The Worst Person in the World	Verdens verste menneske	Joachim Trier	Norway
2023	Empire	Vifetn	Frederikke Aspöck	Denmark
2023	Bubble	Kupla	Aleksi Salmenperä	Finland
2023	Driving Mum	Á ferð með mömmu	Hilmar Oddsson	Iceland
2023	The Edge of the Shadows	Alanngut Killinganni	Malik Kleist	Greenland
2023	Opponent	Motståndaren	Milad Alami	Sweden
2023	War Sailor	Krigsseileren	Gunnar Vikene	Norway
2024	Sex		Dag Johan Haugerud	Norway
2024	Crossing		Levan Akin	Sweden
2024	Fallen Leaves	Kuolleet lehdet	Aki Kaurismäki	Finland
2024	The Son and the Moon		Roja Pakari, Emilie Adelina Monies	Denmark
2024	Touch	Snerting	Baltasar Kormákur	Iceland
2024	Twice Colonized		Lin Alluna	Greenland
2025
2025	My Eternal Summer	Min Evige Sommer	Sylvia Le Fanu	Denmark
2025	The Last Paradise on Earth	Seinasta paradís á jørð	Sakaris Stórá	Faroe Islands
2025	The Helsinki Effect		Arthur Franck	Finland
2025	Walls - Akinni Inuk		Sofie Rørdam, Nina Paninnguaq Skydsbjerg	Greenland
2025	When the Light Breaks	Ljósbrot	Rúnar Rúnarsson	Iceland
2025	Dreams (Sex Love)	Drømmer	Dag Johan Haugerud	Norway
2025	Israel Palestine on Swedish TV 1958-1989	Israel Palestina på svensk tv 1958-1989	Göran Hugo Olsson	Sweden

== See also ==
- Nordic Council's Literature Prize
- Nordic Council Music Prize
