= I Belong (film) =

- Directed by: Dag Johan Haugerud
- Written by: Dag Johan Haugerud
- Cinematography: Kim Hiorthøy
- Edited by: Jens Christian Fodstad
- Music by: Peder Kjellsby
- Release date: 14 September 2012 (Norway)
- Running time: 118 minutes
- Country: Norway
- Language: Norwegian

I Belong (Norwegian: Som du ser meg) is a 2012 Norwegian drama film directed by Dag Johan Haugerud. It was nominated for the 2013 Nordic Council Film Prize.

The film's world premiere was at the 2012 Norwegian International Film Festival, where it won the Nordic Film Prize, worth 75000 NOK.

At the 2013 Amanda Awards, I Belong won the top prize (Best Feature) as well as the awards for Best Actress (Laila Goody), Best Original Screenplay (Dag Johan Haugerud), and Best Director (Dag Johan Haugerud).
