= Silje Storstein =

Norwegian actress

Silje Storstein (born March 30, 1984, in Oslo) is a Norwegian actress.

Storstein was educated at the Norwegian National Academy of Theatre from 2005 to 2008. She has appeared in performances at Det Norske Teatret, Trøndelag Teater, and the National Theater in Oslo. She debuted as Sophie in the 1999 film Sophie's World, which was at the time the most expensive Norwegian film made. Since then she has held several minor film and TV roles, including Homesick (2015), Kielergata (2018) and Kuppel 16 (2021). She is the daughter of actor and musician Are Storstein.

== Theatre roles ==
Year	Work	Role	Theatre
2008	Før solnedgang	Inken Peters	Det Norske Teater
2009	Peter Pan	Wendy	Det Norske Teater
2009	Den store landevegen	Møllerjenta/Clara m.m.	Det Norske Teater
2009	Antigone	Ismene	Oslo National Academy of the Arts
2009	En folkefiende	Petra	Trøndelag Teater
2010	Romeo and Juliet	Juliet	Trøndelag Teater
2010	Reisen til Julestjernen	Petrine	National Theatre (Oslo)
2010	Befri deg Selv	Paula/Birgitta	Scenekunstkollektivet Banken
2011	Vi har så korte armar	Liv	Det Norske Teater
2011	Tida og rommet	Sovekvinna	Det Norske Teater
2011, 2012	Gjøglaren	Giovanni som barn / Barnet	Det Norske Teater
2012	Evita	Baroness	Det Norske Teater
2012	Bjørnen	Popova	Det Norske Teater
2013	Tvillingsjeler	Gunvor Hofmo	Riksteatret
2014	Woyzeck	Marie	Det Norske Teater

== External references ==
- Silje Storstein at IMDb
- Profile at Trøndelag Teater
- Sofies verden (Sophie's World) at filmweb.no
