= Love (2024 film) =

2024 film directed by Dag Johan Haugerud

- Norwegian release poster
- Norwegian: Kjærlighet
- Directed by: Dag Johan Haugerud
- Written by: Dag Johan Haugerud
- Produced by: Hege Hauff Hvattum; Yngve Sæther
- Starring: Andrea Bræin Hovig; Tayo Cittadella Jacobsen
- Cinematography: Cecilie Semec
- Edited by: Jens Christian Fodstad
- Music by: Peder Kjellsby
- Production company: Motly
- Distributed by: Arthaus
- Release date: September 6, 2024 (Venice)
- Running time: 120 minutes
- Country: Norway
- Language: Norwegian
- Box office: $267,240

Love (Norwegian: Kjærlighet) is a 2024 Norwegian drama film written and directed by Dag Johan Haugerud, starring Andrea Bræin Hovig and Tayo Cittadella Jacobsen. It is the third entry in Hagerud's Sex, Dreams, Love trilogy, following 2024's Sex and Dreams (Sex Love).

The film had its world premiere at the main competition of the 81st Venice International Film Festival, aiming for the Golden Lion.

== Premise ==
Doctor Marianne and nurse Tor meet outside of work on a ferry and strike up a conversation. After learning about his laissez-faire approach to love and sexual relationships, Marianne wonders if Tor's philosophies could work in her own life.

== Cast ==
- Andrea Bræin Hovig as Marianne
- Tayo Cittadella Jacobsen as Tor
- Thomas Gullestad
- Lars Jacob Holm
- Marte Engebrigtsen
- Marian Saastad Ottesen
- Morten Svartveit

== Production ==
Filming for Love took place in 2022.

== Release ==
In July 2024, Love was announced at the main competition of the 81st Venice International Film Festival, where it had its world premiere on 6 September 2024. The film was also selected for the MAMI Mumbai Film Festival 2024 under World Cinema.

== Reception ==
The film received critical acclaim.

The New York Times described it as "so beautiful that you want to just keep dwelling in its world". Slant gave the film 3 out of 4 stars, calling it "utterly enrapturing". It also received 3 out of 4 stars from RogerEbert.com, where Simon Abrams argued it "remains distinct" amongst its contemporaries and praised its direction: "Haugerud seems to understand the therapeutic value and dramatic potential of [its premise]." In an enthusiastic review, Zachary Barnes of The Wall Street Journal stated, "Mr. Haugerud has fashioned a film with a rich complexity of feelings, navigated by people taking full advantage of their own freedoms. It’s the sort of talky European drama that, in its well-expressed thoughtfulness, leaves one feeling strangely refreshed."

== Accolades ==
Award	Date	Category	Recipient	Result	Ref.
Venice International Film Festival	7 September 2024	Golden Lion for Best Film	Love	Nominated	
Venice International Film Festival	7 September 2024	Queer Lion	Love	Nominated	
Merlinka Festival	15 December 2024	Jury Prize for Best Feature Film	Love	Nominated	
Tromsø International Film Festival	19 January 2025	FIPRESCI Prize	Love	Won	
Göteborg Film Festival	1 February 2025	Best Nordic Film	Love	Nominated	
Göteborg Film Festival	1 February 2025	Best Acting	Andrea Bræin Hovig	Won	
Robert Awards	31 January 2026	Best Non-English Language Film	Dag Johan Haugerud	Nominated	
