= The Battle of Oslo =

2025 Norwegian historical war thriller film

- Teaser poster
- Norwegian: Blücher
- Directed by: Daniel Fahre
- Written by: Axel Hellstenius; Melike Leblebicioglu Kaveh
- Produced by: Tom Marius Kittilsen; Knut Inge Solbu
- Starring: Bjørn Sundquist; Jon Øigarden; Øystein Røger; Axel Bøyum; Fridtjov Såheim; Odin Waage
- Cinematography: Torfinn Ronning Sanderud
- Edited by: Vetle Stream
- Music by: Johannes Ringen
- Production company: Fenomen Studios AS
- Distributed by: Global Constellation; Ymer Media; Scandinavian Film Distribution
- Release dates: 17 August 2025 (Norwegian); 26 September 2025 (Norway)
- Running time: 95 minutes
- Country: Norway
- Language: Norwegian

The Battle of Oslo (Norwegian: Blücher) is a 2025 Norwegian historical–war thriller film directed by Daniel Fahre. The film is set during the Battle of Drøbak Sound, part of the German invasion of Norway in April 1940. It follows Colonel Birger Eriksen at Oscarsborg Fortress and the sinking of the German cruiser Blücher.

The film also depicts the Military Commission of Inquiry of 1946, led by Erik Solem, played by Terje Strømdahl, and naval member Per Askim, played by Jon Øigarden. It shifts between the intense events at Oscarsborg and the overlooked proceedings of 1946, where Eriksen is summoned to justify his actions before a military inquiry. It opened the 53rd Norwegian International Film Festival on 17 August 2025 and had its premiere in Main Programme.

It was released in Norwegian theaters on 26 September 2025.

== Cast ==
- Bjørn Sundquist as Colonel Birger Eriksen, Commandant of Oscarsborg Fortress
- Terje Strømdahl as Erik Solem, Chairman of the Military Commission of Inquiry of 1946
- Jon Øigarden as Captain Per Askim, the Norwegian Navy's representative in the Military Commission of Inquiry of 1946
- Eldar Skar as Captain Magnus Sødem, Commander of the main battery
- Øystein Røger as Commander Senior Grade Andreas Anderssen, Acting Commander of the torpedo battery
- Håvard Bakke as Captain Thorleif Unneberg, Commander of the Intelligence and Signal Detachment
- Axel Bøyum as Sub-lieutenant Sigurd Bexrud, Torpedo Officer
- Fridtjov Såheim as Lieutenant August Bonsak, Sødem's second-in-command
- Elias Holmen Sørensen as Captain Vagn Jul Enger, Commander of the Kopås battery
- Odin Waage as Second lieutenant Bjarne Berntsen, Signal Officer
- Mads Ousdal as Major General Jacob Hvinden Haug (voice), Commander of the 2nd Division and Commandant of Akershus Fortress
- Andrea Berntzen as Borghild Eriksen, Colonel Eriksen's Polio stricken daughter
- Jonas Hoff Oftebro as Second lieutenant Kristen Høie, Coastal Artillery Officer in charge of operating the rangefinder at the main battery
- Kai Remlov as Rear Admiral Johannes Smith-Johannsen (voice), Commander of the 1st Naval District
- Robert Skjærstad as Major Hersleb Adler Enger (voice), Commander of Rauøy Fortress
- Jo Jørgen Stordal as Sergeant Ragnvald Rækken, Chief Gunner on Canon 1 ("Moses")
- Andreas Høvik as Sergeant Øivind Strøm, Chief Gunner on Canon 2 ("Aron")
- Niels Halstensen Skåber as Private Egil Hansen, a non-combatant called in to man one of the canons
- Valdemar Dørmænen Irgens as Private Knut Espeli, a runner assigned to the Signal Detachment

== Production ==
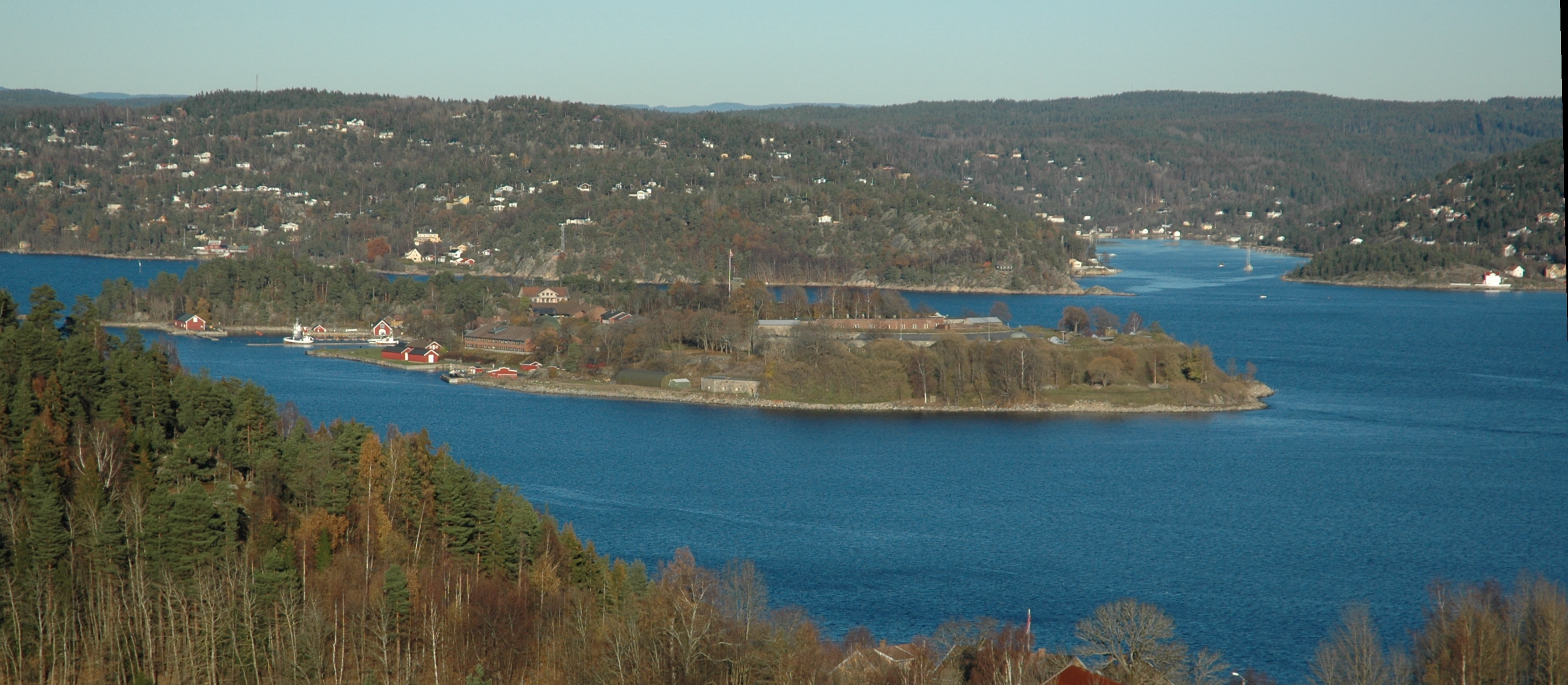
Oscarsborg Fortress in the Oslo fjord

The filming began on 9 April 2024 at the authentic locations in the Oscarsborg Fortress Weapons from 1916 were used to shoot the film.

== Release ==
The Battle of Oslo opened 53rd Norwegian International Film Festival on 17 August 2025. A public outdoor screening of the film took place at the Oscarsborg Fortress on 15 August 2025 before its premiere at the festival.

The film had its International premiere in the World Cinema Now section of the 37th Palm Springs International Film Festival on 3 January 2026.

== Accolades ==
Award	Date of ceremony	Category	Recipient(s)	Result	Ref.
Amanda Award	22 August 2026	People's Amanda	The Battle of Oslo	Won	
