= Roja Pakari =

Danish film director and screenwriter

- Born: 1981 (age 43–44); Bandar Abbas, Iran
- Occupation: Documentary film director

Roja Pakari is a documentary film director from Iran.

Roja Pakar was born in Bandar Abbas, Iran, in 1981. When she was four years old, her family received an asylum in Denmark. She entered the National Film School of Denmark and graduated in 2015. Her graduation film, Zayesh, was dedicated to the artist Hamraz Bayan.

In 2017, she was diagnosed with bone marrow cancer.

In 2024, she was awarded the Nordisk Film Prize for her feature film The Son and the Moon. In this autobiographical film, Pakari shares her love for her son, their family's dramatic history, and her own battle with cancer.

== Filmography ==
- 2015 – Zayesh;
- 2019 – Love Child (assistant director);
- 2024 – The Son and the Moon (Min arv bor i dig), co-directed with Emilie Adelina Monies.
