= Sex (2024 film) =

2024 film by Dag Johan Haugerud

- Theatrical release poster
- Directed by: Dag Johan Haugerud
- Written by: Dag Johan Haugerud
- Produced by: Yngve Sæther; Hege Hauff Hvattum
- Starring: Jan Gunnar Røise; Thorbjørn Harr; Siri Forberg; Birgitte Larsen; Theo Dahl; Nasrin Khusrawi; Anne Marie Ottersen; Vetle Bergan; Iver Innset
- Cinematography: Cecilie Semec
- Edited by: Jens Christian Fodstad
- Music by: Peder Capjon Kjellsby
- Production companies: Motlys; Viaplay Group
- Distributed by: Arthaus
- Release dates: 17 February 2024 (Berlinale); 1 March 2024 (Norway)
- Running time: 118 minutes
- Country: Norway
- Language: Norwegian
- Box office: $1.4 million

Sex is a 2024 Norwegian romantic drama film written and directed by Dag Johan Haugerud. The film, starring Jan Gunnar Røise and Thorbjørn Harr, is the first instalment in Haugerud's Sex, Dreams, Love trilogy. It follows two men in heterosexual marriages whose unexpected experiences challenge their perceptions of sexuality, gender and identity.

The film had its world premiere in the Panorama section of the 74th Berlin International Film Festival on 17 February 2024. It was released theatrically in Norway on 1 March 2024 by Arthaus.

== Synopsis ==
The story unfolds against the backdrop of modern urban Norway. Through clever wordplay, the film challenges conventional notions of masculinity and societal norms, regardless of whether the characters identify as heterosexual or homosexual.

Two chimney sweeps, both in monogamous, heterosexual marriages, find themselves in situations that challenge their perspectives on sexuality and gender norms. One of them has a sexual encounter with another man, yet does not interpret it as an expression of homosexual desire or infidelity. Meanwhile, the other experiences vivid nocturnal dreams where he appears as a woman. This bewildering experience leads him to question how much external perception shapes his identity and whether he has suppressed aspects of himself, thus limiting his true self.

== Cast ==
- Jan Gunnar Røise as chimney sweep #1
- Thorbjørn Harr as chimney sweep #2 (the boss)
- Siri Forberg as chimney sweep #1's wife
- Birgitte Larsen as chimney sweep #2's wife

== Production ==
On 22 September 2022, Viaplay handed the making of a trilogy of films titled "Sex, Dreams and Love", to director Dag Johan Haugerud. Produced by Norway's Motlys and Viaplay, the trilogy was supported by the Norwegian Film Institute, the Nordisk Film & TV Fond, the Oslo Filmfond and Arthaus. Haugerud in an interview with Variety revealed that he was inspired by Krzysztof Kieślowski's Three Colours trilogy (1993–1994) to take this project. He said, "The aim was to make three films that deal with the same topics from different perspectives." He elaborated, "They should look and feel very different, but give the impression that they are all part of the same conversation."

== Release ==
Sex had its world premiere in the Panorama section of the 74th Berlin International Film Festival on 17 February 2024. Ahead of its world premiere, m-appeal world sales acquired the international sales rights to the film in January 2024. The film was released theatrically in Norway on 1 March 2024 by Arthaus.

The film was featured in Features section of the 71st Sydney Film Festival on 6 June 2024. It was screened in the Panorama section of the 2024 Vancouver International Film Festival on 26 September 2024. It was also presented in Strands: Love section of the 2024 BFI London Film Festival on 14 October 2024. In October, it also competed at the 69th Valladolid International Film Festival for Golden Spike.

The film was selected for the MAMI Mumbai Film Festival 2024 under the World Cinema section. It was showcased in the official selection Out of competition at the Luxembourg City Film Festival on 8 March, 2025. The film was screened in Les Auteurs at the 49th Hong Kong International Film Festival on 19 April 2025.

== Reception ==
=== Critical response ===
Savina Petkova reviewing the film at Berlinale for Cineuropa wrote, "the film is very much concerned with talking, and not at all about sexual acts themselves." Petkova concluded, "Sex acknowledges that all of our conventions are constantly in the process of being destroyed and reconfigured."

Reviewing the film for the International Cinephile Society, Matthew Joseph Jenner remarked that Sex is "an intelligent and complex film, and outside of a few brief, almost inconsequential moments in which we can feel the desire manifesting in these characters, it is a straightforward film that refuses to resort to shocking imagery or intentionally scintillating conversations to stir a reaction" and called it “one of the most bold and unflinching deconstructions of masculinity we have seen in years.”

=== Accolades ===
Award	Date	Category	Recipient	Result	Ref.
Berlin International Film Festival	25 February 2024	Panorama Audience Award for Best Feature Film	Dag Johan Haugerud	Nominated	
Berlin International Film Festival	25 February 2024	Prizes of the Ecumenical Jury	Sex	Won	
Berlin International Film Festival	25 February 2024	CICAE Art Cinema Award	Sex	Won	
Berlin International Film Festival	25 February 2024	Europa Cinemas Label Award	Sex	Won	
Amanda Award	23 August 2024	Best Norwegian Film	Sex	Nominated	
Amanda Award	23 August 2024	Best Director (film)	Dag Johan Haugerud	Won	
Amanda Award	23 August 2024	Best Screenplay	Dag Johan Haugerud	Won	
Amanda Award	23 August 2024	Best Actor in a Leading Role	Jan Gunnar Røise	Won	
Amanda Award	23 August 2024	Best Actor in a Leading Role	Thorbjørn Harr	Nominated	
Amanda Award	23 August 2024	Best Actor in a Supporting Role	Siri Forberg	Won	
Amanda Award	23 August 2024	Best Sound Design	Yvonne Stenberg	Nominated	
Amanda Award	23 August 2024	Best Original Soundtrack	Peder Kjellsby	Nominated	
Amanda Award	23 August 2024	Best photo	Cecilie Semec	Nominated	
Amanda Award	23 August 2024	Best Costume Design	Ida Toft	Nominated	
Valladolid International Film Festival	26 October 2024	Golden Spike	Sex	Nominated	
Nordic Council Film Prize	29 October 2024	Nordic Council Film Prize	Sex	Won	
