= Dreams (Sex Love) =

2024 Norwegian drama film

- Theatrical release poster
- Norwegian: Drømmer
- Directed by: Dag Johan Haugerud
- Written by: Dag Johan Haugerud
- Produced by: Hege Hauff Hvattum; Yngve Saether
- Starring: Ane Dahl Torp; Selome Emnetu; Ella Øverbye; Anne Marit Jacobsen
- Cinematography: Cecilie Semec
- Edited by: Jens Christian Fodstad
- Music by: Anna Berg
- Production companies: Motlys AS; Novemberfilm
- Distributed by: Arthaus
- Release date: 4 October 2024
- Running time: 110 minutes
- Country: Norway
- Language: Norwegian

Dreams (Sex Love) (Norwegian: Drømmer) is a 2024 Norwegian drama film written and directed by Dag Johan Haugerud. In between Sex and Love, it is the second part of a trilogy by Haugerud that deals with the complexity of human relationships, sexuality and social norms. The film follows Johanne's (Ella Øverbye) infatuation with her French teacher Johanna (Selome Emnetu), which ignites tensions within her family, as her mother and grandmother confront their own unfulfilled dreams and desires.

The film was released in Norwegian theaters on 4 October 2024. In 2025, it was selected for the Main Competition at the 75th Berlin International Film Festival, where had its international premiere on 19 February 2025, and won the Golden Bear.

== Plot ==
Seventeen-year-old Johanne is a secondary school student in Oslo who lives with her single mother, Kristin, and is close to her grandmother, Karin, a published author. After reading a novel about a romantic affair between a student and a teacher, Johanne develops an intense crush on her French teacher, Johanna. The two begin spending time together outside of school, as Johanna teaches Johanne how to knit at her apartment. Johanne's infatuation grows, and she frequently fantasizes about Johanna reciprocating her feelings.

To cope with her overwhelming emotions, Johanne writes a nearly 200-page autobiographical manuscript detailing her longing, physical desires, an alleged intimate encounters with Johanna. Seeking an outlet, Johanne shares the manuscript with Karin. Karin is highly impressed by the manuscript's literary merit and, going against Johanne's wishes, shows it to Kristin. Kristin is shocked by the explicit content and becomes deeply concerned that Johanna has abused her position of power and engaged in inappropriate conduct with her daughter.

The manuscript creates tension within the family. Karin considers the text a work of art with genuine potential for publication, and reading it prompts both older women to reflect on their own past relationships and unfulfilled desires. Kristin, however, remains focused on the reality of the situation. She directly confronts Johanna, asking her if the physical events described in the manuscript actually occurred. Johanna refuses to give a clear answer, leaving her mother and grandmother unsure of how much of the text is reality and how much is fabricated fantasy.

One afternoon, Johanne is visiting Johanna's apartment when the doorbell rings. The visitor is an older woman named Frøydis, an art student at the academy who is also receiving knitting help from Johanna. Noticing that Frøydis is explicitly invited and sensing a more mature, peer-like dynamic between the two older women, Johanne feels out of place and promptly leaves the apartment.

Sometimes later, Johanne attends an appointment at a psychiatrist's office. While at the clinic, she unexpectedly encounters Frøydis. The two women strike up a conversation, leaving the building together, and walk off to get a coffee.

== Cast ==
- Ella Øverbye as Johanne
- Selome Emnetu as Johanna, French teacher
- Ane Dahl Torp as Kristin, Johanne's mother
- Anne Marit Jacobsen as Karin, Johanne's grandmother
- Andrine Sæther as Anne

== Production ==
On 22 September 2022, Viaplay handed the making of a trilogy of films titled "Sex, Dreams and Love", to director Dag Johan Haugerud. Produced by Norway's Motlys and Viaplay, the trilogy was supported by the Norwegian Film Institute, the Nordisk Film & TV Fond, the Oslo Filmfond and Arthaus. Haugerud in an interview with Variety revealed that he was inspired by Krzysztof Kieślowski’s 1993-1994 Three Colours trilogy to take this project. He said, "The aim was to make three films that deal with the same topics from different perspectives." He elaborated, "They should look and feel very different, but give the impression that they are all part of the same conversation."

The English title was changed from Dreams to Dreams (Sex Love) in order to distinguish it from the 2025 Michel Franco film Dreams, which was also in the 2025 Berlin competition.

== Release ==
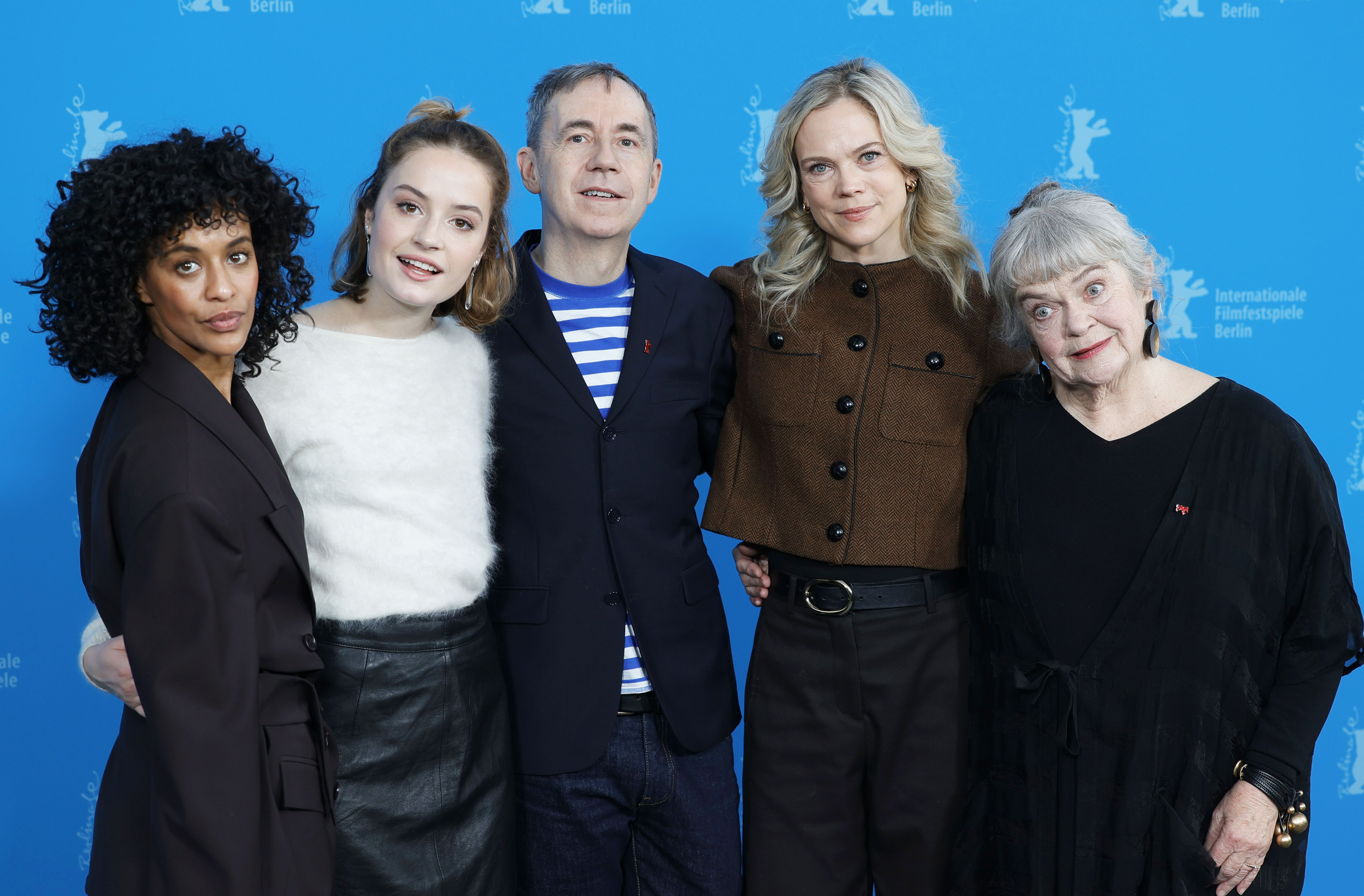
Dreams (Sex Love) presentation (from L to R) Selome Emnetu, Ella Øverbye, Dag Johan Haugerud, Ane Dahl Torp and Anne Marit Jacobsen

The film was released in Norwegian cinemas on 4 October 2024.

Dreams (Sex Love) had its international premiere on 19 February 2025, as part of the 75th Berlin International Film Festival, in Competition. The film made its Asian premiere closing the 49th Hong Kong International Film Festival on 21 April 2025.

It was released theatrically in Germany on 8 May 2025 by Alamode Film.

The film featured at the 72nd Sydney Film Festival in the Features section on 4 June 2025. It was also a part of the Horizons section of the 59th Karlovy Vary International Film Festival, where it was screened from 4 July to 10 July 2025. It was showcased at the 53rd Norwegian International Film Festival as Amanda Award nominee on 16 August 2025, and at the 29th Lima Film Festival in the 'Acclaimed' section.

Dreams (Sex Love) was also a part of the World Cinema at the 2025 Atlantic International Film Festival and screened on 11 September 2025, and then it was also presented in the Icon section at the 30th Busan International Film Festival on 21 September 2025.

It competed in the Main Program Together Again at the Zagreb Film Festival for Golden Pram Award on 12 November 2025. On the same day, it was presented in Official Section of 22nd Seville European Film Festival.

It was presented in 'From The Festivals - 2025' section of the 56th International Film Festival of India in November 2025.

== Reception ==
On the review aggregator website Rotten Tomatoes, 91% of 43 critics' reviews are positive, with an average rating of 7.8/10.

Peter Bradshaw reviewing for The Guardian rated the film with 4 out of 5 stars and wrote that the film is a cunning, chatty, and playful creation reminiscent of Lukas Moodysson’s early film Show Me Love.

== Accolades ==
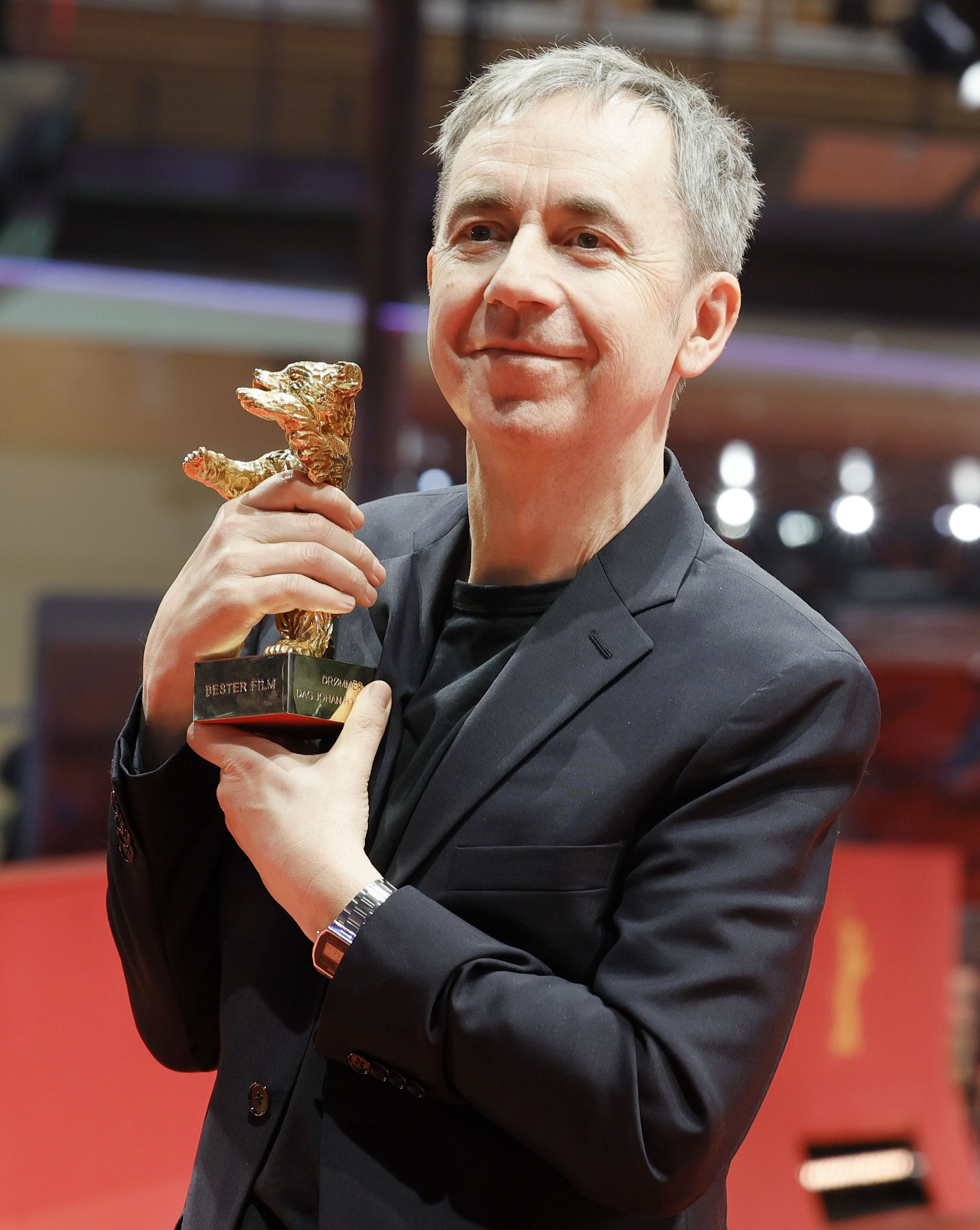
Dag Johan Haugerud won the Golden Bear at the Berlinale 2025

The film was selected to be a shortlisted feature film for the 38th European Film Awards, which was announced on 14 October 2025. The film was shortlisted as the Norwegian submission submission for Best International Feature Film at the 98th Academy Awards; Sentimental Value, the eventual winner, was chosen instead.

Award	Date of ceremony	Category	Recipient	Result	Ref.
Berlin International Film Festival	23 February 2025	Golden Bear	Dreams (Sex Love)	Won	
Berlin International Film Festival	23 February 2025	FIPRESCI Prize	Dreams (Sex Love)	Won	
Berlin International Film Festival	23 February 2025	Prize of the Guild of German Arthouse cinemas	Dreams (Sex Love)	Won	
Amanda Award	16 August 2025	Best Norwegian Film	Dreams (Sex Love)	Nominated	
Amanda Award	16 August 2025	Best Director (film)	Day Johan Haugerud	Nominated	
Amanda Award	16 August 2025	Best Actor in a Leading Role	Ella Øverbye	Nominated	
Amanda Award	16 August 2025	Best Sound Design	Gisle Tveito	Nominated	
Amanda Award	16 August 2025	Best Original Soundtrack	Anna Berg	Nominated	
Amanda Award	16 August 2025	Best Costume Design	Ida Toft	Nominated	
Amanda Award	16 August 2025	Best Editing	Jens Christian Fodstad	Won	
Nordic Council Film Prize	31 October 2025	Nordic Council Film Prize	Dreams (Sex Love)	Nominated	
Robert Awards	31 January 2026	Best Non-English Language Film	Dag Johan Haugerud	Nominated	
