= Laila Goody =

Norwegian actress (born 1971)

- Born: Laila Elin Goody; 22 March 1971 (age 55); Stavanger, Norway
- Education: Stavanger Katedralskole; Norwegian National Academy of Theatre
- Occupation: Actress
- Years active: 1994 – present

Laila Elin Goody (born 22 March 1971) is a Norwegian actress. She was born to an English father who worked in the oil industry and a Norwegian mother. She was born in Stavanger and grew up in Rosendal, Hordaland, between the ages of two and ten, before returning to Stavanger. Here she attended Stavanger Katedralskole. After graduating from the Norwegian National Academy of Theatre in 1994, she began working at the National Theatre. After nine years at this theatre she decided to take a break, and in 2003 she moved on to do guest performances at Trøndelag Teater and Centralteatret.

Among her theatre roles are the title role in Friedrich Schiller's Mary Stuart, "Hilde" in Henrik Ibsen's The Lady from the Sea, and "Catherine" in David Auburn's Proof. The year 2003 was also when her film and television career started taking off, and in the following years she had leading roles in the movies Jonny Vang (2003) and Den som frykter ulven (2004). Her effort at Centralteatret in the double role as "Shen Te" and "Shui Ta" in Bertolt Brecht's The Good Person of Sezuan (2006) was called "excellent" and "the most important reason" to watch the play. She has been called "Norway's most awarded young actress", and among the awards she has received are NRK Radioteatrets pris, Gösta Ekmans Nordiske Minnefond, Per Aabels ærespris and Narvesen-prisen. In 2002 she was awarded the television award Gullruten for her role in the Ibsen-drama "Rosmersholm". In the same year she was also nominated for an Amanda Award for the same role, but lost to Hildegun Riise.

In 2013 Goody won the Amanda Award for Best Actress, for I Belong.

Goody has been married once, for two years, when she was 23 to 25 years old. She later became romantically involved with Anderz Eide, a freelance actor at Trøndelag Teater. She lives in Sagene.

== Select filmography ==
- 1996: Maja Steinansikt
- 1996: Markus og Diana
- 1998: 1732 Høtten
- 2002: Lekestue (TV)
- 2003: Jonny Vang
- 2004: A Cry in the Woods
- 2007, 2008: Kodenavn Hunter (TV)
- 2012: I Belong
- 2017. Valkyrien (TV series)
- 2021: HAN
- 2025: No Comment
