= Erik Solem =

Norwegian judge (1877–1949)

Erik Toralf Solem
- Born: 23 August 1877; Kristiania, Norway
- Died: 15 July 1949 (aged 71); Norway
- Occupation: Judge
- Known for: Supreme Court Justice, member of Norwegian resistance leadership, legal purge after WWII

Erik Toralf Solem (23 August 1877 – 15 July 1949) was a Norwegian judge.

He was born in Kristiania. He worked as a Supreme Court barrister from 1905, district stipendiary magistrate (sorenskriver) from 1912 to 1927 and acting professor of jurisprudence from 1931 to 1932. He served as a Supreme Court Justice from 1938 to 1948, except for the period between December 1940 and May 1945, during the German occupation of Norway. During those years, he was a member of the Norwegian resistance movement's leadership and viewed as the successor of Paal Berg should Berg die. Following the end of the occupation he was active in the legal purge, as an ad hoc presiding judge in Eidsivating. Among others, he presided over the case where Vidkun Quisling was sentenced to death for high treason. Harsh in his sentencing, he was nicknamed "Erik Bloodaxe" by some, but later remitted some of his own sentences.
