= Cadaver (2020 film) =

2020 Norwegian film

- Film poster
- Norwegian: Kadaver
- Directed by: Jarand Herdal
- Written by: Jarand Herdal
- Starring: Gitte Witt; Thomas Gullestad; Thorbjørn Harr; Tuva Olivia Remman; Kingsford Siayor; Maria Grazia Di Meo; Jonatan Rodriguez; Trine Wiggen
- Cinematography: Jallo Faber
- Edited by: Jens Peder Hertzberg
- Music by: Jonathan Sigsworth
- Production company: Motion Blur: SF Studios
- Distributed by: Netflix
- Release date: October 22, 2020
- Running time: 86 minutes
- Country: Norway
- Language: Norwegian

Cadaver (Norwegian: Kadaver) is a 2020 Norwegian horror film and a psychological thriller directed and written by Jarand Herdal and starring Gitte Witt, Thomas Gullestad and Thorbjørn Harr.

== Plot ==
The Norwegian city in which Leonora (Gitte Witt) and Jacob (Thomas Gullestad) live with their little daughter Alice (Tuva Olivia Remman), was hit by a nuclear disaster. There seems to be no electricity, no work, nor any food left and no hope. While everybody is struggling to survive Leonora hears about a theatre play – which comes with a warm meal – at one of the few buildings that has not been destroyed: the hotel. The family is hungry and Leonora hopes for a good time, so she buys evening tickets for all of them.

Alice is first refused entry. However the overly charming hotel director, Mathias (Thorbjørn Harr), personally steps in and welcomes the young girl to his "wonderland" (referring to her being named Alice).

The atmosphere is very festive as the building not only has electricity, but also candles, white table cloths and antique furniture. About 40 or 50 people are happy to be seated at tables for the meal, and most are so starved that they directly grab the slices of meat and eat with their hands. Mathias informs his guests that the entire hotel will be the stage of the night's performance. To differentiate the visitors from the actors, all spectators are given heavy golden masks.

A few actors start performing and as the guests are invited to attend any performance that interests them anywhere in the large, atmospheric building, people start to explore the numerous floors of the vast building. Not long after the family started to follow the performances, Leo and Jacob lose Alice in one of the long, dark corridors. They start to call her and search for her, hardly noticing that most of the other spectators seem to have disappeared.

As Leo navigates through the red labyrinthine corridors, she finds odd trapdoors and strange men in white overalls, but no Alice. As the search continues, more and more strange occurrences pile up. Another spectator they pair up with vanishes, leaving behind only a single earring. Leo is haunted by visions of Alice, and eventually is led down into a boiler basement by a trail of clothing resembling Alice's dress, with the missing woman's husband and another spectator joining the search. The trio find clothes being burned in the boiler, and a fight breaks out as Leo remains hopeful they may find Alice. Jacob insists that all hope is lost, blaming Leo for bringing them to the hotel. The other spectator they were with turns out to be part of the hotel's cast and turns on the couple, prompting Jacob to throw himself at the man to give Leo a chance at escape. She fails to get away, finding the hallway blocked by one of the large men in overalls.

It is uncovered that the hotel and its "performance" is a plot to lure in and murder the desperate people in surrounding towns and cities. Mathias selects a few survivors to help in capturing the remaining spectators to then be harvested for their flesh, which is turned into the meals eaten at the start of each performance. Leo is caught, and offered a chance to join the group by both Mathias and Jacob, who seems to have joined him while she was unconscious. She refuses, and Jacob, unwilling to see his wife die, attacks one of the men working in the butchery to save her, being stabbed to death in the process.

Leo runs out to confront Mathias in front of a new audience, now all adorned in their gold masks and already having been given the spiel about the "performance". Nobody believes that what she says is true, assuming it to be part of the show, but Leo acts on her feet, pulling from her past life as an actress. She makes a dramatic speech about finding her daughter, making herself appear to be the most interesting actor, and the new crowd easily follows her. She leads the group down into the kitchen where they discover she was telling the truth, and promptly attack Mathias and the others involved in his plot.

Leo breaks down as the crowd disperses, and believes she is seeing another hallucination of Alice. This Alice turns out to be real, though, and she embraces her daughter, leading her away from the hotel. The pair find the streets outside just as desolate and hopeless as before, and it is next to the body of a starved boy in the road that the two stop, turning back to see a golden light shining down from above on the hotel in the distance.

== Cast ==
- Gitte Witt as Leonora 'Leo'
- Thomas Gullestad as Jacob
- Thorbjørn Harr as Mathias
- Tuva Olivia Remman as Alice
- Kingsford Siayor as Lars
- Maria Grazia Di Meo as Kathrine
- Jonatan Rodriguez as David
- Trine Wiggen as Rakel

== Reception ==
=== Critical response ===
The film has a 33% 'Rotten' rating on review aggregator Rotten Tomatoes.

According to Sheena Scott of Forbes, who gave the film a mixed review, 'The story in Cadaver is too predictable, you'll guess pretty quickly what will happen, but there is a creepy atmosphere that works well.'

Karine Adelgaard of Heaven of Horror gave the film a negative review, stating that 'For a while the plot works really well, offering a quite immersive experience. Ultimately, too many plot points mean the heart of the story is lost. However, it does offer up a very satisfying conclusion that leaves its viewers with a more positive sense that we might have expected earlier on.'
