= Kykelikokos =

Norwegian children's television program

- The show's logo from 1996 to 2003.
- Genre: Children's television series, Live television, Comedy, Educational, Game show
- Starring: Jørn Kolsrud; Sigrid Lindstad
- Country of origin: Norway
- Original language: Norwegian
- No. of seasons: 15

Production
- Production locations: Oslo, Norway
- Running time: 120 minutes

Original release
- Network: NRK
- Release: 10 February 1996 – 10 May 2003

Kykelikokos was a weekly Norwegian children's television program that ran from 1996 to 2003. It was the first live children's show ever produced in Norway. It was highly popular, and usually drew close to a quarter million viewers every week.

The show began in 1996, airing Saturdays at 8 to 10 AM, a timeslot it held throughout its entire seven-year run.
