= Fridtjov Såheim =

Norwegian stage director, stage actor and film actor

- Born: 2 July 1968 (age 57); Norway
- Occupations: Actor and director (for stage)
- Years active: 2003–present
- Spouse: Henriette Steenstrup (m. 2006; div. 2016)
- Children: 2 (daughter and son)

Fridtjov Såheim (born 2 July 1968) is a Norwegian stage director, stage actor and film actor.

== Biography ==
Såheim has worked for the theatres Den Nationale Scene, Rogaland Teater and Nationaltheatret. Among his characters is the title role in Woyzeck, and the protagonist "Raskolnikov" in Crime and Punishment. He has staged an adaptation of Anton Chekhov's play Uncle Vanya and Jon Fosse's play Dei døde hundane at Rogaland Teater. He played a principal role in the 2006 film The Art of Negative Thinking, and played the character "Ibsen" in the documentary film Løven – Henrik Ibsen. In 2013 he received the Amanda Award for "Best Actor in a Supporting Role" in the film Victoria.

In 2012 he began playing the role of Jan Johanson in the television series Lilyhammer, with Sopranos actor Steven Van Zandt.

In 2016 he had a cameo appearance as himself in S1E4 of the television series Trailer Park Boys: Out Of The Park: Europe.

In 2017 in the series Norsemen, he played the no nonsense slave Odd.

In 2020 he began playing the role of Sindre in the Netflix series Ragnarok.

In 2022 he appeared in the Norwegian monster film Troll as Minister of Defence Frederick Markussen.

In 2025, Såheim played the role of Lieutenant August Bonsak in the feature film The Battle of Oslo.
