= Dag Johan Haugerud =

Norwegian filmmaker (born 1964)

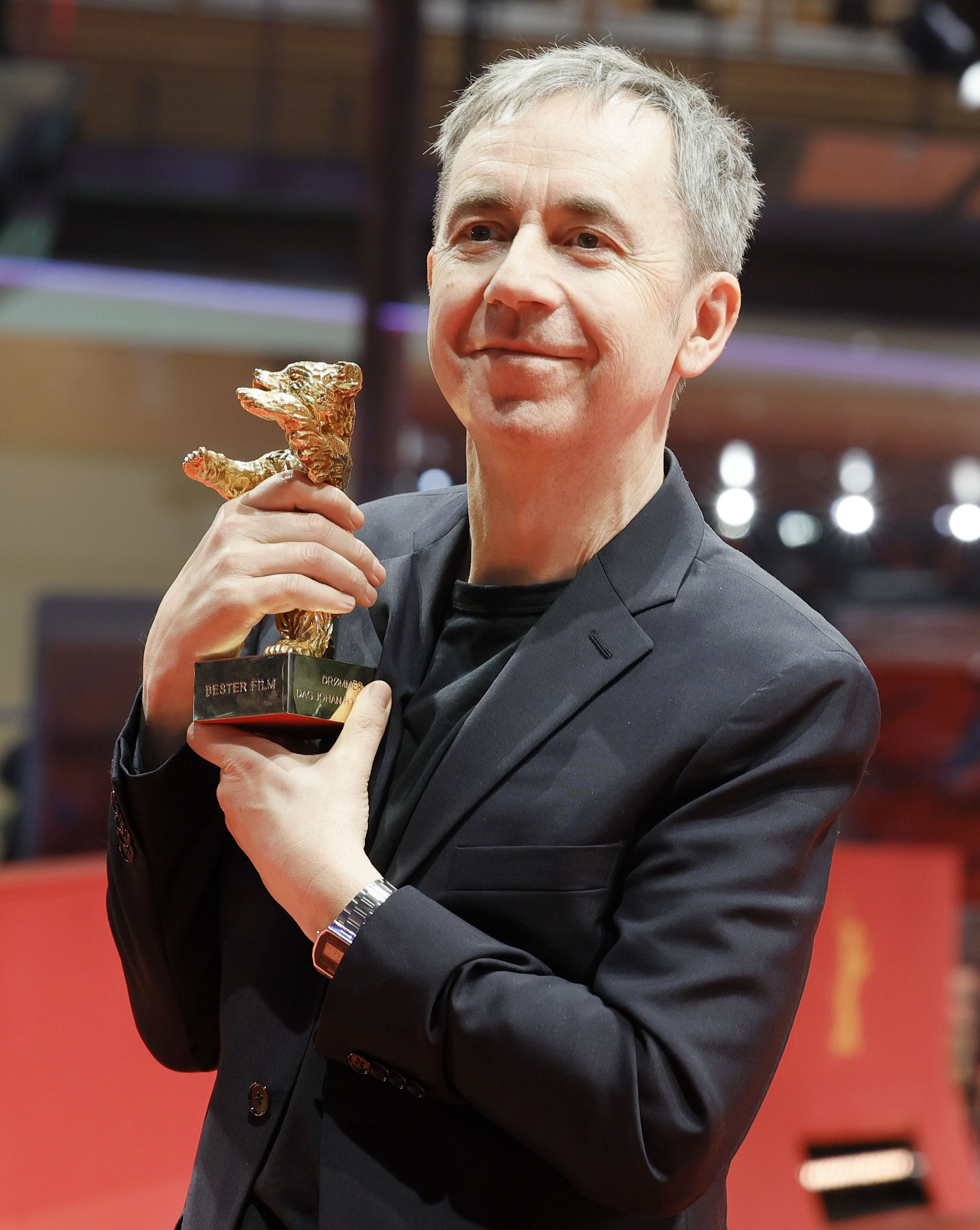
- Haugerud at the 75th Berlin International Film Festival in 2025
- Born: 30 December 1964 (age 61)
- Occupations: Librarian; novelist; screenwriter; film director
- Awards: Amanda Award (2013, 2020); Nordic Council Film Prize (2020, 2024)

Dag Johan Haugerud (born 30 December 1964) is a Norwegian librarian, novelist, screenwriter and film director.

His films include I Belong, which won Amanda Awards in 2013, Beware of Children, which won nine Amanda Awards in 2020, as well as the Nordic Council Film Prize, Sex, which was awarded the 2024 Nordic Council Film Prize, and Dreams (Sex Love), which won the Golden Bear in 2025 at the 75th Berlin International Film Festival.

== Career ==
Haugerud's novels include Noe med natur (1999), Den som er veldig sterk, må også være veldig snill (2002), Hva jeg betyr (2011) and Enkle atonale stykker for barn (2016).

He has created several short films, including Utukt from 2000 and Trøbbel from 2006.

His first feature film was the 2012 film I Belong, which won Amanda Awards in 2013 for Best Film, Best Script, Best Director and Best Actress (Laila Goody).

In 2014, Haugerud directed the medium-length film I'm the One You Want (Det er meg du vil ha).

In 2019, he directed the film Beware of Children (original title Barn), and also wrote the script for the film. The film won a record of nine Amanda Awards in 2020, including best script and best director, as well as the Nordic Council Film Prize. The film also won the Norwegian Film Critics Award (Filmkritikerprisen) for 2020.

His 2020 film The Light from the Chocolate Factory (Lyset fra sjokoladefabrikken) treated relations between girlfriends.

In 2024, Haugerud directed Sex, the first instalment in the "Sex Dreams Love" trilogy, which was selected in the Panorama section at the 74th Berlin International Film Festival. Love, the trilogy's second instalment, was selected to compete for the Golden Lion at the 81st Venice International Film Festival. He was awarded the 2024 Nordic Council Film Prize for the film Sex.

Haugerud directed the third instalment of the trilogy, Dreams (Sex Love), which had its international premiere in February 2025 at the 75th Berlin International Film Festival, where the film won the Golden Bear. This was the first time a Norwegian film won the Golden Bear.

He was awarded the Aamot Statuette in 2025, along with producer Yngve Sæther.

== Filmography ==
Year	English title	Original title	Notes
2000	Utukt		Short
2006	Trøbbel		Short
2012	I Belong	Som du ser meg	
2014	I'm the One You Want	Det er meg du vil ha	
2019	Beware of Children	Barn	
2020	The Light from the Chocolate Factory	Lyset fra sjokoladefabrikken	
2024	Sex		
2024	Dreams (Sex Love)	Drømmer	Golden Bear winner
2024	Love	Kjærlighet	
