= Jan Gunnar Røise =

Norwegian actor (born 1975)

- Born: 24 September 1975 (age 50); Eidsvoll, Norway
- Occupation: Actor

Jan Gunnar Røise (born 24 September 1975) is a Norwegian actor.

He was born in Eidsvoll, and took his education at the Norwegian National Academy of Theatre. He made his stage debut in 2000 at the National Theatre, and has been employed there since. Film appearances include Hawaii, Oslo and Gymnaslærer Pedersen. He also had an appearance as Olav in the 2011 feature film The Thing. He had a lead role of Asbjørn in 2022 drama Fenris, and Chimney Sweeper in 2024 drama film Sex.
