= Thorbjørn Harr =

Norwegian actor

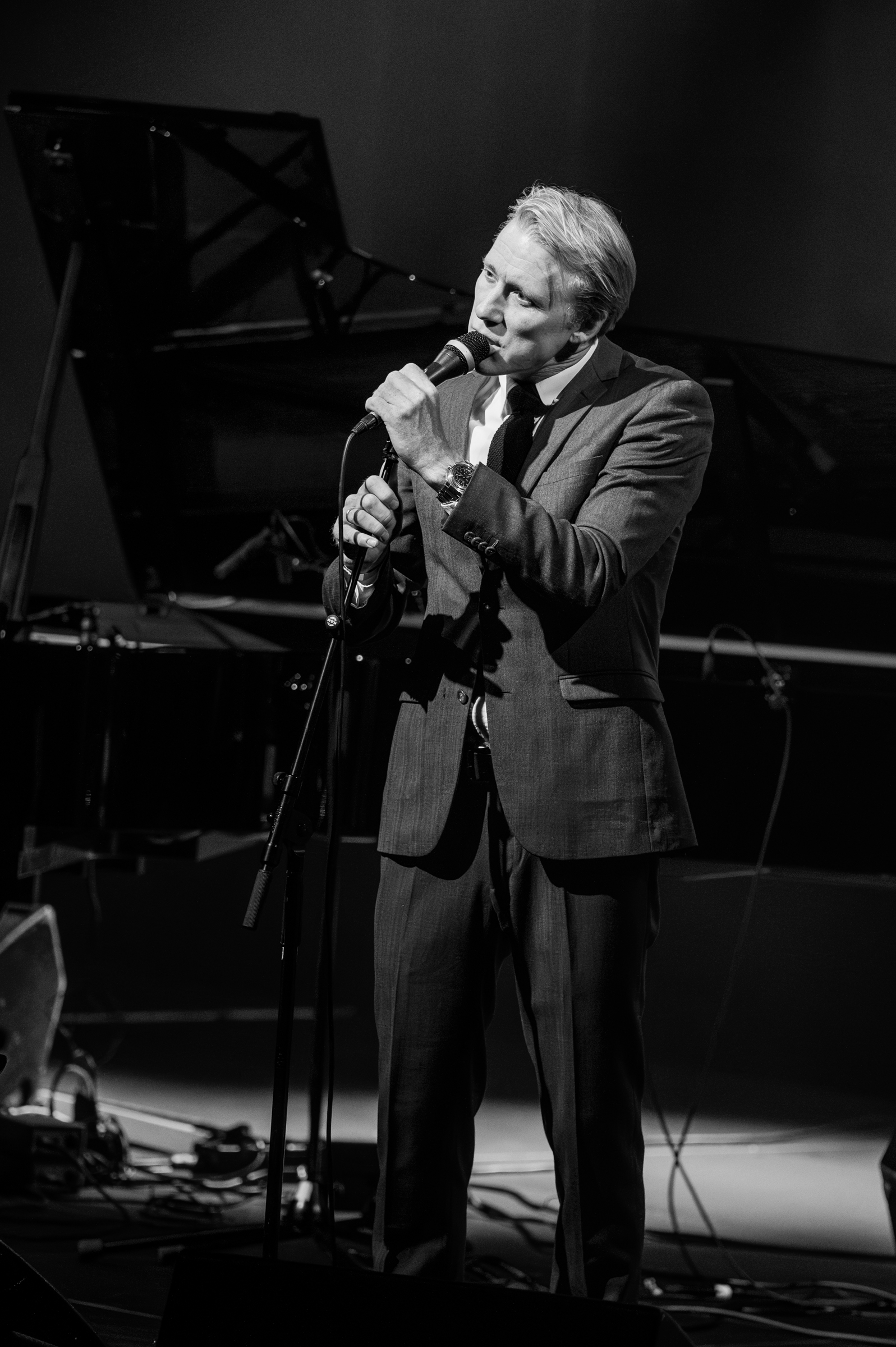
- Harr in 2023
- Born: 24 May 1974 (age 52); Oslo, Norway
- Occupation: Actor
- Spouse: Tai Victoria Grung (m. 2006)
- Children: 3

Thorbjørn Harr (born 24 May 1974) is a Norwegian actor.

== Background ==
Harr was discovered in a schoolyard by NRK people who were scouting for actors for youth series.

== Personal life ==
Harr married Tai Victoria Grung in 2006; they have three children.

== Career ==
He soon became a familiar face on programs like Blikkbåx and U and also appeared in the popular 1991 television movie Frida – med hjertet i hånden. He later had minor roles in Lille Lørdag in 1995 and a major role in the mini-series Lekestue broadcast on NRK in 2002. His real film debut came in 2003 in Mot Moskva, where he played the leading role of Vassi and was nominated for an Amanda Award, and in 2005 he appeared in Venner for livet. He played the lead role of Mathias in Mars & Venus (2007). He played Jarl Borg in History's Vikings.

Beginning in 2000, he has also appeared in several stage productions. With comedian Harald Eia and two others, he runs Teatersport Oslo. More recently, he has had a recurring role in the American comedy-drama TV series Younger, playing the love interest of a character played by Hilary Duff.

=== Stage ===
Shortly after graduating from the Norwegian National Academy of Theatre in 2000, Harr joined the National Theatre in Oslo. He has appeared there as Håkon Håkonsson in Ibsen's The Pretenders and as the young Speer in the production of the same name. He has played Figaro in Beaumarchais' The Marriage of Figaro, Erhart in John Gabriel Borkman, and Tom in The Glass Menagerie. He has appeared in many productions by Jo Strømgren, including There, which won the 2002 Hedda Award for best play. As of January 2007 he had appeared in almost 20 National Theatre productions.

== Filmography ==
Key
†	Denotes films that have not yet been released

Year	Title	Role	Notes
1991	Frida – Straight from the Heart		Television film also released in theaters
2003	Mot Moskva	Vassi	
2005	Venner for livet	Roger	
2005	Thomas Hylland Eriksen og historien om origamijenta	Anders	
2006	Overlap		
2006	Reprise	Mathis Wergeland	
2007	Mars & Venus	Mathias	
2008	De gales hus	Stetson	
2010	Olsenbanden Jr. Mestertyvens skatt	Manager of retirement home	
2012	Inn i mørket	Jan	
2013	Frozen	Kristoff	Voice role, Norwegian-language version,
2016	The Last King	Inge Bårdsson	
2018	22 July	Sveinn Are Hanssen	
2019	The Tunnel		
2020	Togo	Charlie Olsen	
2020	Cadaver	Mathias	
2024	Sex	CEO	
2026	No Paradise If You Are Killed by a Woman †		

=== TV ===
Year	Title	Role	Notes
1995	Lillelørdag	Bærumsoss	
1997	Tre på toppen		
2001	Fox Grønland	Thomas Heistad	1 episode
2002	Lekestue	Kjell	
2003	Senkveld med Thomas og Harald	Himself	Guest
2005	Først & sist	Himself	Guest
2006	Gutta Boys	Arne's father	
2008	Hvaler	Dental patient	
2009	Løvebakken	Politician	
2013	Vikings	Jarl Borg	
2015	Younger	Anton Bjornberg	Recurring role
2018	Kielergata	Jonas Schulman/Stefan	
2020	Norsemen	Jarl Bjornnn	
2024	La Palma	Jens Uvdal	

=== Audiobooks ===
Year	Author	Title
2007	Johan Harstad	DARLAH
2008	Jo Nesbø	Hodejegerne

== Awards ==
- 2005: Per Aabel prize
- 2009/10: Norwegian Theatre Critics Award, for Chet spiller ikke her.
- 2011: Blue Bird prize of the NRK Radio Theatre, for Chet spiller ikke her and Hvitvasking.
- 2025: 'Haugesund Walk of Fame', an award in the form of granite blocks laid in Haugesund's Haraldsgata at the 53rd Norwegian International Film Festival.
