= Andrea Bræin Hovig =

Norwegian actress (born 1973)

- Born: Kaja Andrea Bræin Hovig; 19 July 1973 (age 53)
- Occupation: Actress
- Years active: 2000 – present
- Spouse: Andreas Utnem

Andrea Bræin Hovig (born 19 July 1973) is a Norwegian actress.

She graduated from the Norwegian National Academy of Theatre in 1998, and has since acted both at Det Norske Teatret (the Norwegian Theater) and at Nationaltheatret (the National Theatre). At Nationaltheatret she has had roles such as "Juliet" in Shakespeare's Romeo and Juliet, and "Hilde" in Ibsen's The Lady from the Sea. In 2000 she received Anders Jahre's cultural award for young artists. Hovig has also acted in films and on television, such as De 7 dødssyndene (The 7 Deadly Sins, 2000) and "Berlinerpoplene" (TV, 2007). She is also a singer, and has acted in the musical Chicago, and released an album of standard songs. In 2018 she portrayed school teacher, Elin Müller Schulman in Kielergata. She took the role of Unn in Kuppel 16 (2022).

Hovig is married to the musician Andreas Utnem, and the two have one child together.
