= Arntzen =

Arntzen is a surname. Notable people with the surname include:

- Andrea Arntzen (1875–1958), Norwegian nursing teacher
- Andreas Arntzen (1777–1837), Norwegian politician
- Andreas Arntzen (barrister) (1928–2012), Norgwegian barrister
- Arthur Arntzen (politician) (1906–1997), Norwegian politician
- Arthur Arntzen (writer) (1937–2025), Norwegian journalist, humorist, actor and writer
- Charles Arntzen, American plant molecular biologist
- Emilie Hegh Arntzen (born 1994), Norwegian handball player
- Haakon Arntzen, Canadian politician
- Heinrich Arntzen (1894–unknown), German flying ace during World War
- Holly Arntzen, Canadian singer, dulcimer player, and pianist
- Jon Gunnar Arntzen (born 1951), Norwegian encyclopaedist
- Karelius August Arntzen (1802–1876), Norwegian politician
- Lloyd Arntzen (born 1927), Canadian jazz clarinettist, folk singer, and soprano saxophonist
- Niels Arntzen Sem (1782–1859), Norwegian politician
- Ole Arntzen (1910–1973), Norwegian businessman and resistance leader
- Ole Arntzen Lützow (1801–1871), Norwegian politician
- Ole Arntzen Lützow-Holm (1853–1936), Norwegian priest and politician
- Orie Arntzen (1909–1970), American baseball player
- Sture Arntzen (born 1948), Norwegian trade unionist
- Sven Arntzen (1897–1976), Norwegian barrister

== See also ==
- Arntzen de Besche, Norwegian business law firm
