= 1951 in Norway =

- Centuries: 18th; 19th; 20th; 21st
- Decades: 1930s; 1940s; 1950s; 1960s; 1970s
- See also: List of years in Norway

Events in the year 1951 in Norway.

== Incumbents ==
- Monarch – Haakon VII.
- Prime Minister – Einar Gerhardsen (Labour Party) until 9 November, Oscar Torp (Labour Party)

== Events ==
- 19 November – Torp's Cabinet is appointed.
- Norsk Hydro opens a PVC plant at Herøya.
- Municipal and county elections are held throughout the country.

== Popular culture ==
=== Literature ===
- Gunvor Hofmo, writer and poet, is awarded the Gyldendal's Endowment literature prize for the first time.
- Ola Viker makes his literary debut with the novel Gullskoen.

== Notable births ==
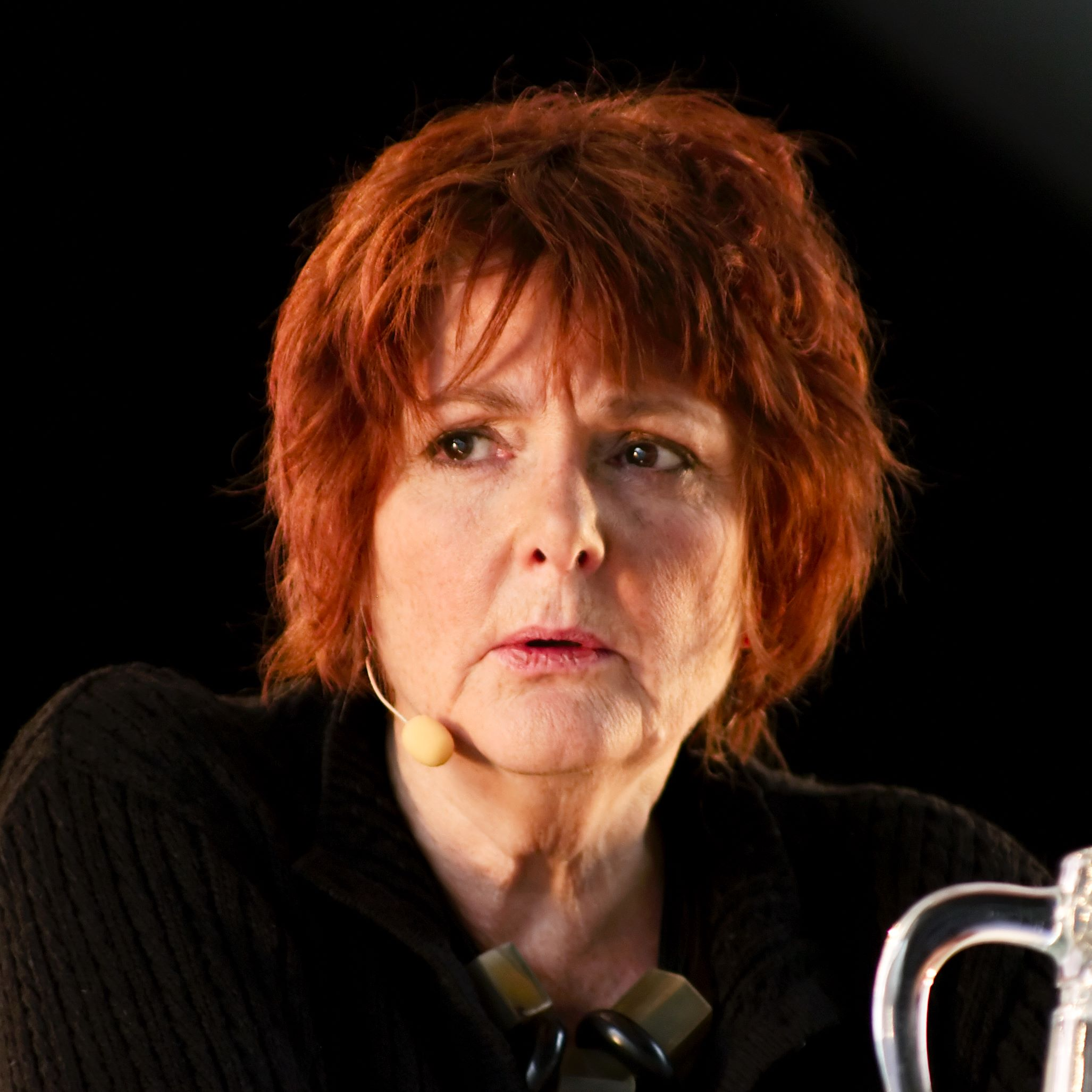
Cecilie Løveid

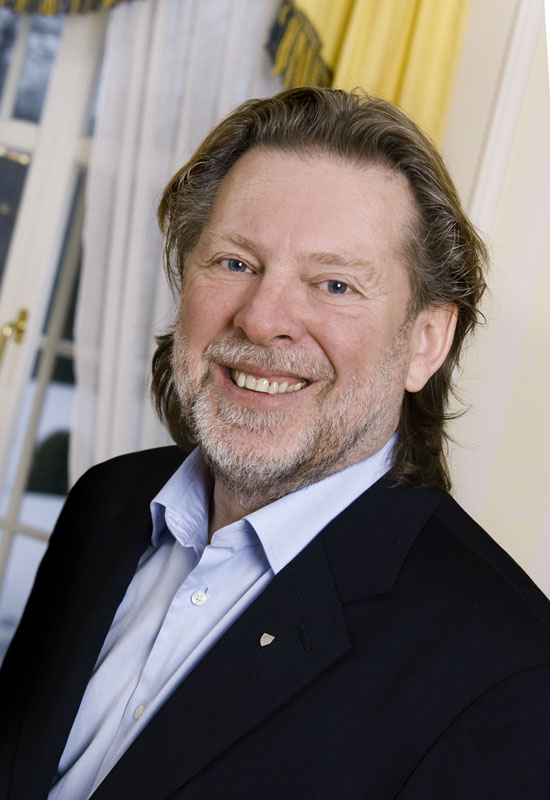
Odd Reitan

- 23 January – Dan Børge Akerø, television personality
- 1 February – Ellen Horn, actress, politician and Minister
- 24 February – Erna Osland, children's writer.
- 1 March – Berit Oskal Eira, politician (d. 2021)
- 10 March – Eva Harr, artist (died 2024).
- 16 March – Oddvar Brå, cross-country skier, world champion.
- 19 March – Vegard Bye, politician
- 22 March – Stein Kåre Kristiansen, journalist
- 29 March
  - Elisabeth Røbekk Nørve, politician
  - Hans-Wilhelm Steinfeld, journalist
- 13 April – Kaci Kullmann Five, politician and Minister
- 14 April – Terje Tysland, singer, songwriter.
- 26 April – Tor Bomann-Larsen, writer and illustrator.
- 13 May – Wenche Lyngholm, politician
- 2 June – Marianne Borgen, politician.
- 5 June – Sigrun Eng, politician
- 9 June – Geir Bøhren, composer
- 17 June – Sissel Buchholdt, handball player.
- 25 July – Hans O. Felix, trade unionist
- 4 August – Per Knutsen, writer and playwright (died 2022).
- 13 August – Barry Gjerde, translator and voice actor
- 20 August – Helge Torvund, writer.
- 21 August – Cecilie Løveid, writer.
- 7 September – Kari Lise Holmberg, politician
- 11 September – Odd Reitan, merchant.
- 2 November – John Olav Egeland, journalist and editor
- 30 November –
  - Rønnaug Kleiva, writer.
  - Torild Wardenær, writer.
- 8 December – Jan Eggum, singer-songwriter
- 8 November – Heidi Larssen, politician
- 2 December – Anne Berit Andersen, politician
- 12 December – Erik Hillestad, record producer.
- 15 December – Bente Angell-Hansen, diplomat
- 17 December – Sylvi Graham, politician
- 30 December – Trond Fevolden, civil servant

== Notable deaths ==
- 14 January – Tor Jonsson, author and journalist (born 1916)
- 21 January – Erik Ramstad, one of the founders of Minot, North Dakota (born 1860)
- 23 March – Johan Henrik Wiers-Jenssen, newspaper columnist and theatre director (born 1897)
- 24 March – Anton Djupvik, politician (born 1881)
- 5 April – Elias Corneliussen, naval officer (born 1881).
- 6 April – Halfdan Cleve, composer (born 1879)
- 9 April – Vilhelm Bjerknes, physicist and meteorologist (born 1862)
- 4 June – Lauritz Wigand-Larsen, gymnast and Olympic silver medallist (born 1895)
- 10 June – Håkon Evjenth, jurist and children's writer (born 1894).
- 19 June – Ivar Kirkeby-Garstad, politician and Minister (born 1877)
- 4 July – Anton Berge, agronomist and politician (born 1892)
- 17 September – Jon Skeie, jurist (born 1871).
- 6 October – Olav Kringen, newspaper editor (born 1867).
- 14 October – Anton Johnson Brandt, veterinarian (born 1893)
- 18 December – Arthur Olsen, boxer (born 1900)
- 28 December – Nils Opdahl, gymnast and Olympic gold medallist (born 1882).

=== Full date unknown ===
- Lars Olai Meling, politician and Minister (born 1876)
- Gustav Smedal, jurist and irredentist activist (born 1888)
