= Regina Folk Festival =

Canadian music festival

The Regina Folk Festival (RFF) was an annual music festival held in Victoria Park in Regina, Saskatchewan, Canada. A three-night and two-day event usually held the second weekend of August, the RFF attracted more than 35,000 people. It operated with the help of approximately 650 volunteers, 11 board members, and seven paid staff members.

The year 2019 marked the RFF’s 50th anniversary. However, festival organizers announced in early 2025 that financial constraints would force the festival to shut down permanently.

== History ==
=== Early years ===
The Regina Guild of Folk Music hosted the first ever RFF on the University of Saskatchewan’s Regina Campus (now known as the University of Regina). “Newman’s First Annual Folk Festival” was held from March 14 to 16, 1969, at the Campion-Newman Centre, a cafeteria in Campion College. Humphrey and the Dumptrucks from Saskatoon and Roberta Nichol from Regina were among the “35 modern Canadian groups” to perform, as described on the festival poster. Shows started at 8:30 p.m. nightly. Tickets were $1 at the door, or $2.50 in advance for all three nights.

Ken Chesko, Terry Yuzik and Dick Jack started the Regina Guild of Folk Music.

In the early years, the festival was collaboratively run, with an emphasis on local and regional musicians.

The Regina Guild of Folk Arts (not “Music”) was registered as a non-profit corporation in Saskatchewan on Feb. 7, 1975. Its objectives were “to preserve and to promote the folk arts in its traditional and modern definition primarily in Regina, Saskatchewan,” and “to educate the people of Regina as to folk traditions in the arts upon which their lifestyles are based by means deemed by the directors.” Richard Wegrzyn, Peter Sawchyn, Peter Hilsden, Gayle Warren (now Bryanton) and Craig Mahood applied for incorporation and were its first directors.

In 2006, the Regina Guild of Folk Arts’ name was changed to the Regina Folk Festival Inc., in a vote by its membership.

In 1975, the fee for an annual membership was $10. In 2018, it was $15 or 15 hours of volunteerism.

In its first two decades, the festival changed venues numerous times. It was hosted at the University of Regina in various locations: the Newman Centre at the year-old Campion College in 1969 and the Education Auditorium (1970, 1973, 1975, 1981–84) on the newer south Regina campus; and the Fine Arts Building (1976–80) on the old campus (the former Normal School, and the current Canada Saskatchewan Production Studios or Soundstage). In 1971 and 1972, it was held in the Jubilee Theatre at the Centre of the Arts, now known as the Conexus Arts Centre. In 1974, it took place at the Globe Theatre, then located at 2124 11th Ave.

=== Moving outdoors ===
In its first seven years, the Regina Folk Festival took place in March. It was scheduled in later months as the years progressed — four years in a row in April, then four in May. By 1984, the 16th festival, it took place in June, which allowed for two outdoor stages to be part of festival at the University of Regina.

In 1985, the RFF moved outdoors to Victoria Park, where it has remained. k.d. lang was the Sunday night headliner that year. Through 1993, it was a free event.

“It was our hope that the move to a free, out-of-doors festival would introduce to a whole new audience the world of folk music, contemporary and traditional,” Folk Guild president Will Oddie wrote in 1986.

Until 1997, the festival took place in June. It has been held in August since 1998, except for 2005, when it occurred the last weekend of July.

Hosting an outdoor festival has had its challenges. Even in that first year, “after two days (Friday and Saturday) of near perfect weather, the festival site was swept with high winds and rain on Sunday.”

In 1993, the “steady rain and strong winds often made the experience feel like standing in the bow of a freighter fighting through a storm in the North Atlantic.”

In 2007, City and Colour was cancelled on the mainstage due to a storm. He performed at the after-party at the Royal Canadian Legion, to a fraction of the festivalgoers.

In 2014, Royal Canoe played through a power outage at the after-party at The Exchange. Headliner Sam Roberts, who had been stormed out from the main stage, also performed.

In 2018, record-breaking heat proved a challenge for organizers.

=== Battling debt ===
Today, the Regina Folk Festival charges admission for its evening shows, by single-night ticket or weekend pass. The daytime concerts are free to attend.

When the first festival was held in 1969, it was $1 for a single night ticket or $2.50 for all three nights.

From 1985 to 1993, this wasn’t the case. To draw a larger audience, organizers opted to offer free admission to the festival, now located in Victoria Park. It became increasingly difficult to fund the festival, which relied on grant funding, fundraisers and donations to fund the annual event.

In 1991, it offered a beer garden for the first time — a controversial decision for a family-friendly festival — because “we’ve got to do something to generate some sort of income so (the festival) can stay free of charge,” said artistic director Norma Cyr.

The 1987 festival had a $10,000 deficit. In 1990, there was a $1,800 shortfall. Its performance budget in 1991 was $24,000. Its total costs were $150,000 in 1991.

In 1992, “Regina came perilously close to not having a folk festival,” as Brigdens Printers Ltd. sued the folk guild for $21,000 and threatened to garnish its bank accounts and revenue from ticket sales from a Friday night pre-festival cabaret. That was related to printing the 1991 program and the fundraiser calendar.

“In reality, it is getting tougher and tougher to keep it free,” said festival general manager Karen Haggman.

It trimmed its budget by one-fifth in 1992.

In 1994, with an accumulated deficit of $14,000, organizers decided to cancel the festival. Part of that was due to a failed fundraising initiative, a lottery calendar that lost $8,000. Despite successful fundraising efforts, the 1993 festival lost $9,000.

“We’ve been paying last year’s bills with this year’s money for the past three years,” Haggman told the Leader-Post. “(Cancelling) gives us the chance to clear up this situation and go into 1995 with a good, workable plan.”

A donation from ticket sales to the musical Hair, which toured to the Centre of the Arts in late April 1994, helped pay down more than $5,000 of its debt, and organizers felt confident they would return in 1995.

There were some hurdles, however. Planning a ticketed event meant fencing off the stage area, but city officials at first disagreed with fencing off part of Victoria Park. Moving out of downtown would have lost the festival $10,000 in Regina Market Square grant funding.

It never came to that. In 1995, the festival returned to Victoria Park, its budget trimmed to $70,000.

Admission was $10 per night, or $15 for a two-night pass.

In 1983, a weekend pass was $25.

“$10 doesn’t come anywhere close to covering the actual cost,” organizer Keith Fortowsky told the Leader-Post. “But 40 bucks a night would be a ridiculous cost.”

“The reintroduction of a nominal gate admission for evening concerts could go a long way in addressing financial issues,” Norm Walker wrote in the 1995 program.

== Modern era (1995 - present) ==
Since 1995, the Regina Folk Festival has taken place — and grown — in Victoria Park.

With the mainstage set up in the northwest corner, there are three smaller stages spread throughout the park (including a children’s stage), and one on the F.W. Hill Mall.

Much of that growth has been due to Sandra Butel, artistic director who began working with the festival in 1999.

When she began, she was the only paid staff member of the festival with a $100,000 budget. In 2012, the RFF had a $1-million budget, four full-time staff and contract employees.

She has developed a festival designed for various age groups and demographics, with a focus on accessibility.

=== Daytime entertainment ===
The free daytime concert stages — which first became part of the festival in 1976 — are a priority for Butel and the RFF.

Butel told the Leader-Post prior to the 2018 festival, “The diversity of the audience we see during the day is much greater than what we see at night. The free day time allows us to make it a welcoming place for everybody and that’s very important to us. We’ve been working really hard to find new sources of funding. We started a donor campaign, for those who actually afford it, they can contribute to that and make sure that it still exists for people that can’t afford a ticket.”

During the day, patrons can also partake in activities, thanks to the RFF’s partnerships with Common Weal and MacKenzie Art Gallery.

A children’s area offers a stage with child-specific entertainment, crafts, face-painting and a parade.

=== Food and arts vendors ===
With the official opening of the City Square Plaza (adjacent to Victoria Park’s north side) in 2012, the arts’ and vendor markets had room to expand.

The 2018 festival had 18 food vendors — including Afghan Cuisine, Bon Burger, Michael’s Coffee Shop & Bakery, Selam Ethiopian Restaurant, and Malinche — and more than 29 arts vendors— including Mortise and Tenon, Kat Cadegan Jewellery, and Naked Kitty Naturals.

=== Other details ===
Since as early as 1997, Calgary-based Big Rock Brewery has sponsored the beer garden.

In 2016, the RFF implemented a new greening initiative, with volunteers specifically overseeing recycling, composting and waste. This was in hopes of diverting 90 per cent or more of the festival’s waste from the landfill.

Year-round, the RFF relies on some 800 volunteers to help run concert series and the festival weekend.

== Concert series and Winterruption ==
As long as it has existed, the Regina Folk Festival (and its predecessor, the Folk Guild) has presented concerts outside of the festival weekend.

In the early days, these were known as “coffeehouses” and were initially held on a weekly basis.

In the 1980s, this led to a concert series.

In 2015, the RFF announced it would add a winter festival. The first Winterruption ran from January 21 to 23, 2016, in Regina, in partnership with the Broadway Theatre in Saskatoon, which also had a festival. There were four shows.

Winterruption has become an annual event. In 2017 and 2018, the festivals ran three nights with two shows per night.

In 2019, Winterruption’s five-night series had one show per night, including an evening devoted to spoken-word poetry, featuring Word Up Regina performers, Zoey Roy and Shane Koyczan.

== Past line-ups ==
The Regina Folk Festival has hosted hundreds of artists in its five-decade history. Some past performers include:

Walk Off The Earth

Tanya Tagaq

Jan Randall

Neko Case

Dakhabrakha

Michael Franti and Spearhead

Tegan and Sara

David Essig

Holly Arntzen

Jim Payne

Colleen Peterson

Buffy Sainte-Marie

Begonia

William Prince

k.d. lang

The Barr Brothers

Vox Sambou

Terra Lightfoot

Blue Rodeo

Kobo Town

Lisa LeBlanc

Serena Ryder

Mavis Staples

Emmylou Harris

Blind Boys of Alabama

Hawksley Workman

Corb Lund Band

The Sadies

Rae Spoon

Jordan Cook

Spirit of the West

Humphrey and the Dumptrucks

Roberta Nichol

Bob Evans

Utah Phillips

Dave McLean

The Irish Rovers

Valdy

Connie Kaldor

The 2019 festival line-up unveiling is to occur on March 13, 2019, at the RFF’s “50th birthday bash” at The Artesian in Regina.

== Venues ==
Since 1985, the RFF has been held outdoors in Victoria Park. In its early years, it changed venues numerous times. It was hosted at the University of Regina in various locations:

- Newman Centre at Campion College (1969);
- Education Auditorium (1970, 1973, 1975, 1981–84);
- Fine Arts Building (1976–80).
- Jubilee Theatre at the Centre of the Arts, now known as the Conexus Arts Centre (1971 & 1972).
- Globe Theatre (1974).

== Artistic directors / music co-ordinators ==
1969 — ?

1970 — “For entertainment information” Ken Chesko, Glenn Wolfe and Dick Jack

1971 — ?

1972 — “For information on bookings” Linda Ewart, Nigel Lacey, Gayle Gustafson

1973 — ?

1974 — ?

1975 — ?

1976 — Entertainment co-ordinator Kendra Walker

1977 — "Festival benevolent dictator" Richard Wegrzyn

1978 — Festival organizer Kathie (Kate) Kokotailo

1979 — Co-ordinator Norm Walker; Bookings Brian Richardson

1980 — Co-ordinator Norm Walker; Bookings Brian Richardson

1981 — Artistic director Norm Walker

1982 — Artistic director Norm Walker

1983 — Artistic director Norm Walker

1984 — Artistic direction Norm Walker, Noele Hall, Mary Wilson, Beth Traynor and Hosken

1985 — Artistic direction Norm Walker and Good Fisch

1986 — Artistic director Gordon Fisch

1987 — Artistic director Gordon Fisch

1988 — Artistic director Gordon Fisch

1989 — Artistic director Gordon Fisch

1990 — Artistic director Norma Cyr

1991 — Artistic director Norma Cyr

1992 — Artistic director Rick August

1993 — Artistic director Rick August

1994 — Festival cancelled due to debt

1995 — Artistic director Norm Walker

1996 — Artistic director Norm Walker

1997 — Artistic director Karen Mondor

1998 — Artistic director Karen Mondor

1999–2019 — Sandra Butel

2020 — Festival cancelled due to the COVID-19 pandemic

2021 — Festival cancelled due to the COVID-19 pandemic, alternative programming offered

2022–present - Amber Goodwyn
