= Jon Lyng =

Norwegian lawyer and politician

Jon Lyng (19 April 1945 – 16 February 2003) was a Norwegian lawyer and politician for the Conservative Party.

He was born in London as a son of John Lyng. A lawyer by profession, he is best known as the defender of Arne Treholt in 1984–1985, together with Andreas Arntzen and Ulf Underland. In politics, he was a State Secretary in the Ministry of Justice and the Police from 1985 to 1986. He was a member of Oslo city council from 1983 to 1991, and chaired his local party branch from 1992 to 1996. He was also chair of Oslo Kinematografer from 1988 to 1991 and 1996 to 2003.

Cultural offices
Preceded by Bjørn Bjørnseth	Chair of Oslo Kinematografer; 1988–1991	Succeeded by Christian Hambro
Preceded by Theo Koritzinsky	Chair of Oslo Kinematografer; 1996–2003	Succeeded by Heidi Larssen
