= Underland =

Underland may refer to:

== Literature ==
- Underland (book), a 2019 non-fiction book by Robert Macfarlane
- Underland (Narnia), the name for all the land under the fictional world of Narnia in the 1953 book The Silver Chair by C. S. Lewis
- The Underland Chronicles, a 2003–2007 series by Suzanne Collins
- Alice in Underland, a short story by Henry Payson Dowst which led to the 1920 film Smiling All the Way
- Unterland, a 1992 novel by Wolfgang Hohlbein
- Alice in Underland, a 2000 non-fiction book by Wolfgang Zuckermann
- Underland, a 2002 Victor Renquist vampire novel by Mick Farren

== Other uses ==
- Ulf Underland (1928–2012), Norwegian barrister
- Underland, a fictional realm from the Adult Swim television series The Venture Bros.
- Underland, a dance work by Stephen Petronio based on the music of Nick Cave and The Bad Seeds and premiered by the Sydney Dance Company at the Sydney Opera House in May 2003
- "Underland", a song by Sleeping People from their 2007 album Growing
- Underland, the proper name of the world visited by the title character in the 2010 film Alice In Wonderland

== See also ==
- Underground (disambiguation)
- Underworld (disambiguation)
