= Axel Otto Normann =

Norwegian journalist and theatre director (1884–1962)

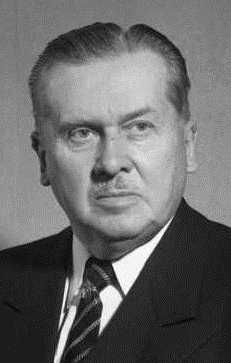
- Axel Otto Normann in 1949
- Born: 23 January 1884; Fredrikstad, Norway
- Died: 8 May 1962 (aged 78)
- Occupations: journalist, newspaper editor, theatre critic and theatre director

Axel Otto Normann (23 January 1884 – 8 May 1962) was a Norwegian journalist, newspaper editor, theatre critic and theatre director.

He was born in Fredrikstad as the son of a wholesaler. He finished his secondary education in 1901 and studied philology at the University of Kristiania and for half a year at Sorbonne University, but without graduating. Instead, he started a career in journalism. In 1905 he was hired as subeditor in the newspaper Posten; he was chief editor briefly in 1907. In 1910 he married actress Helene Andersen (1881–1955). He was a journalist in Aftenposten from 1907 to 1915 and editor-in-chief for Verdens Gang from 1915 to 1922. In 1922, one year before Verdens Gang went defunct, he left Norway for France but continued to write for Norwegian newspapers and magazines. In 1927 he was among the founders of the Norwegian Theatre and Art Critics' Association. In 1929 he returned to Norway as a theatre critic of Arbeiderbladet. He biographed actress Johanne Dybwad in the 1937 book Johanne Dybwad. Liv og kunst. He also contributed to the women's magazine Urd.

He was theatre director at the National Theatre from 1935 to 1941, and again from 1945 to 1946. The reason for his hiatus was the German occupation of Norway. The occupation started on 9 April 1940, whereas the attempts of Nazification came somewhat later. Non-cooperative members of the National Theatre board of directors—literary historian Francis Bull, publisher Harald Grieg and banker Johannes Sejersted Bødtker—were arrested by the Nazi authorities in 1941. With a new, Nazi-friendly board in place, Normann chose to resign as director, returning only after the liberation of Norway in 1945. He had also chaired the Association of Norwegian Theatre Directors from 1936 to 1941, but did not return to this position. He was theatre director for Det Nye Teater from 1947, and for Oslo Nye Teater from 1959 to his death. In 1954 he released his second and last book, editing the festschrift for the 25th anniversary of Det Nye Teater.

Normann was highly decorated. He became a Knight, First Class of the Royal Norwegian Order of St. Olav in 1951 and was a Knight of the Swedish Order of Vasa, Knight of the Belgian Order of Leopold, Commander of the Danish Order of the Dannebrog, Commander of the Finnish Order of the Lion and Officer of the French Légion d'honneur. He died in May 1962 in Oslo.

Cultural offices
Preceded by Johan Henrik Wiers-Jenssen	Director of the National Theatre; 1935–1941	Succeeded by Gustav Berg-Jæger
Preceded by Gustav Berg-Jæger	Director of the National Theatre; 1945–1946	Succeeded by Knut Hergel
