= Gustav Berg-Jæger =

Norwegian journalist, screenwriter, and administrator

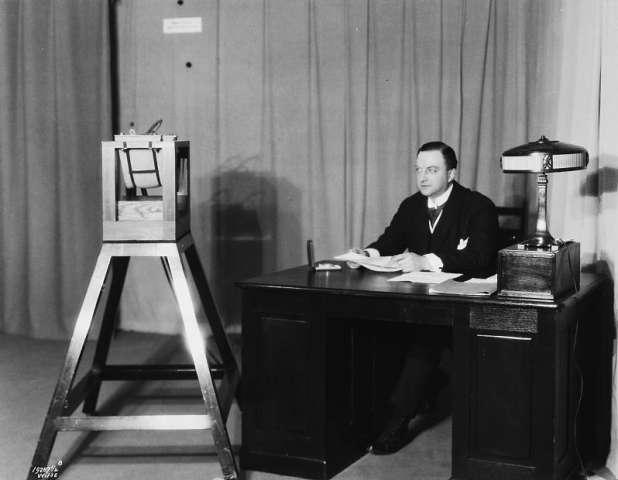
- Born: 31 December 1884
- Died: 1957 (aged 72–73)
- Occupations: journalist, actor, cultural director

Carl Gustav Berg-Jæger (31 December 1884 – 1957) was a Norwegian journalist, actor, cultural director and Nazi collaborator. He is best known as director of Oslo Kinematografer, the National Theatre and briefly the Norwegian Broadcasting Corporation during the occupation of Norway by Nazi Germany. Before the occupation he was among others the editor of Norway's first magazine devoted to broadcast programming.

== Early life and career ==
He was born in Kristiania as a son of Hans Henrik Berg-Jæger (1855–1925) and Thora Bull (1855–1906). He worked as a journalist and theatre critic for Morgenbladet from 1905, and as an actor at Fahlströms Teater from 1908. From 1911 to 1922 he worked in the movie theatre Bio-Kino, which was founded by his father. He edited the monthly magazine Film og Kino from 1916 to 1919 and later Filmen og vi. From 1922 he led an impresario company named Musik-Centralen, and in 1925 he was employed a few months at the first Norwegian broadcasting company, Kringkastingselskapet. He also edited a magazine named Hallo-Hallo!; this was Norway's first magazine devoted to broadcast programming. After resigning in protest from Kringkastingselskapet he worked as an actor as well as in the Norwegian branches of Metro-Goldwyn-Mayer and Paramount Pictures.

== War and post-war career ==
He was appointed as managing director of Oslo Kinematografer by Reichskommissar Josef Terboven in 1940, when the previous managing director Kristoffer Aamot had been fired the same day. Berg-Jæger had joined Nasjonal Samling a week in advance. He was installed as theatre director at the National Theatre by the Nazi authorities from 1941 to 1945, and led the theatre in a difficult period, when the theatre was more or less boycotted by the public. He was also national program director (director of the Norwegian Broadcasting Corporation) in six weeks in 1941–1942. From 1942 he was the chairman of Norsk Film, and he was also a member of Kulturtinget. In 1941 he was the screenwriter for the film Kjærlighet og vennskap, which was directed by fellow Nazi Leif Sinding and starred Sonja Wigert, Georg Løkkeberg, Per Aabel and Rønnaug Alten among others.

After the end of the German occupation on 8 May 1945, he was arrested by the Norwegian authorities on 14 May and imprisoned at Ilebu prison until 1946. As a part of the legal purge after the war he was convicted for his Nazi collaboration in 1947. The sentence was three and a half years of forced labour—albeit suspended—and confiscation of 75,000 kr. He died in 1957 in Bærum.

== Filmography ==
- Brudeferden i Hardanger, 1926

Cultural offices
Preceded by Kristoffer Aamot	Director of Oslo Kinematografer; 1940–1942	Succeeded by Einar Schibbye
Preceded by Axel Otto Normann	Director of the National Theatre; 1941–1945	Succeeded by Axel Otto Normann
