= Oslo Kino =

Norwegian cinema company

Oslo Kino AS
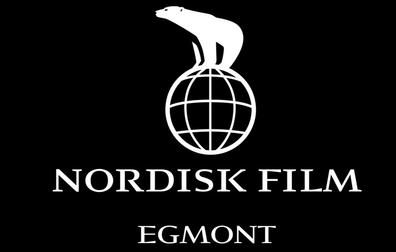
- Company type: Subsidiary
- Industry: Cinema
- Founded: 1 January 1926
- Headquarters: Oslo, Norway
- Area served: Oslo
- Key people: Geir Bergkastet (CEO)
- Parent: Egmont Group
- Website: www.oslokino.no

Oslo Kino is a Norwegian cinema company, based in Oslo.

== History ==
Its creation was agreed to by the city authorities of Oslo in 1925, and the company was inaugurated on 1 January 1926 as Oslo Kinematografer. It was a part of the Norwegian system of municipally owned cinemas, superseding private ownership in the field. Only the Conservative Party and the Liberal Left Party voted against municipalization. These parties subsequently attempted to privatize cinemas in the years after 1926, but failed. An important motivation for municipal ownership was the surplus from the budget, which could be used for other cultural budget posts. Oslo Concert Hall, Folketeatret, Gustav Vigeland's atelier (later the Vigeland Museum) and the Munch Museum received monetary support from the cinema fund.

In 1997 the company was turned into a joint stock company. Between 2001 and 2003 the city council of Oslo tried to orchestrate a sale of 66% of the company shares, but this did not happen. No bidder came close to the expected prize, and the sale thus fell through. The name was changed from Oslo Kinematografer to Oslo Kino in 2007.

== Key people ==
The early directors were Jens Christian Gundersen (1926-1933) and Kristoffer Aamot (1934-1940). During the German occupation of Norway the company had three Nazi collaborators as directors: Gustav Berg-Jæger (1940-1942), Einar Schibbye (1942-1944) and Birger Ilseng (1944-1945). Kristoffer Aamot then recovered his job, and sat until 1955. Theodor Rosenquist followed (1955-1958), then Arnljot Engh (1958-1975), Eivind Hjelmtveit (1975-1993), Ingeborg Moræus Hanssen (1993-2005), Cecilie Trøan (acting, 2005-2006) and Geir Bergkastet (2006-present).

Pre-war chairs of the board of directors were Arthur Skjeldrup (1926-1928), Kristoffer Aamot (1929-1931), Eyvind Getz (1932-1934) and Rachel Grepp (1935-1940). The chairpersons during the German occupation of Norway are not known. After the war, Rolf Hofmo sat from 1946 to 1955, then Rolf Stranger (1956-1967), Albert Nordengen (1968-1971), Adele Lerche (1972-1975), Turid Dankertsen (1976-1979), Albert Nordengen again (1980-1983), Bjørn Bjørnseth (1984-1987), Jon Lyng (1988-1991), Christian Hambro (1992), Theo Koritzinsky (1993-1995), Jon Lyng again (1996-2003) and Heidi Larssen (2003-present). Several directors and chairs were also politicians for the Conservative Party, the party which initially opposed a municipal cinema company.
