= Norwegian Ninja =

- Theatrical release poster
- Directed by: Thomas Cappelen Malling
- Written by: Thomas Cappelen Malling
- Produced by: Eric Vogel
- Starring: Mads Ousdal; Jon Øigarden; Linn Stokke; Amund Maarud; Henrik Horge
- Cinematography: Trond Høines
- Edited by: Simen Gengenbach
- Music by: Gaute Tønder
- Distributed by: Euforia Film
- Release date: 13 August 2010
- Running time: 77 minutes
- Country: Norway
- Language: Norwegian
- Budget: NOK 17,900,000

Norwegian Ninja (Norwegian: Kommandør Treholt & ninjatroppen) is a 2010 Norwegian action comedy film, directed by Thomas Cappelen Malling. The film, based on a 2006 book, presents real-life espionage-convicted Arne Treholt as the leader of a ninja group saving Norway during the Cold War and stars Mads Ousdal as Treholt.

The film is loosely based on the story of Norwegian politician and diplomat Arne Treholt, who in 1985 was convicted of high treason and espionage on behalf of the Soviet Union and Iraq. In 2006, Thomas Cappelen Malling wrote the book Ninjateknikk II. Usynlighet i strid 1978 ("Ninja Technique II: Invisibility in combat 1978"). The book was presented as a military manual written by Treholt in 1978. It achieved a certain cult status, and was considered a success at 5,000 units sold.

== Plot ==
During the Cold War, Arne Treholt leads Norway's Ninja Force, based out of Gressholmen, which answers directly to King Olav V. Members include: Fjellberg, Treholt's deputy; Tromsø, platoon assistant and documentarian; He Who Sleeps, sniper; Coachman, the driver; Ragnhild Umbraco, who runs HM Tool Factory; as well as two apprentices: Black Pete and Bumblebee.

After a Russian sub runs aground in Sweden, the Ninja Force are deployed to search several fjords for possible Russian submarines. No vessels are found but anti-submarine rockets are mistakenly fired in an area the ninja are investigating. Treholt confronts Otto Meyer, head of Norway's CIA-backed Stay Behind force for firing the rockets, and while there takes a copy of their field manual. While King Olav visits he expresses frustration at the repeated interference of Stay Behind on his Ninja Force, as well as the false-flag operations described in the Stay Behind field manual, he orders Treholt to commence Operation Saga Night. Treholt confides in Bumblebee that he foresees that he will ultimately take his place as leader.

To decide which apprentice will be made a full ninja, Black Pete and Bumblebee compete in an orienteering race, while Tromsø and Stay Behind spy drones watch. In order to protect his lead, Pete attacks Bumblebee. For this, Treholt kicks Pete from the Ninja Force and Bumblebee wins by default. After his induction, Treholt and Olav dispense wisdom to Bumblebee, while the other ninja mock his vegetarianism.

After the bombing of the Oslo Central Station, which the CIA blames on the Russians, Treholt travels to Vienna to meet with members of the KGB to verify evidence that Stay Behind was involved. Treholt returns to confront Meyer but is instead threatened to be exposed as a traitor for meeting with the KGB. Treholt throws a shuriken at the picture as he leaves. Meanwhile, Bumblebee visits Ragnhild and reveals that he was in jail as a conscientious objector before Treholt visited him and convinced him to join Ninja Force.

Learning Stay behind is targeting the Alexander Kielland oil rig, Treholt, Bumblebee, Tromsø, and Coachman race to stop them. While they are able to find the bomb and engage a saboteur, they are unable to prevent the destruction of the rig. After returning to Gressholmen, Stay Behind attacks with a combination of aerial bombardment and ground assault, with Black Pete helping to bypass the island's defenses. Despite inflicting heavy losses on the invaders, the Ninja Force is forced to flee, with Treholt taking an injured Bumblebee in one of Stay Behind's skycars. Treholt revives Bumblebee outside Fornebu Airport and sends him, now disguised as Treholt, to be arrested in his place.

The Ninja Force regroup at Ragnhild's workshop in the Lofoten mountains and are joined by Black Pete, who had been acting under Treholt's orders and stole Stay Behind's operational plans. The Ninja force infiltrate the royal palace and take out the Stay Behind death squad posing as the King's bodyguards, use the Stay Behind skycar to intercept a Piper Pawnee aimed at the Oslo City Hall so it merely buzzes the twin towers instead, and police are sent to Meyer's home to arrest him for the weapons cache there. Other leaders of Stay Behind are assassinated by the Ninjas and the Piper Pawnee is redirected to crash into Stay Behind's bunker. Meyer is then intercepted by Treholt as he climbs the Oslo City Hall in an attempt to plant a bomb. Treholt retrieves his shuriken, which Meyer had been wearing around his neck and which concealed a listening device, and then knocks Meyer off the building.

During final sentencing, Bumblebee, who is still disguised as Treholt, thinks back to everything he had been told about freedom and Treholt's plans for him, and finally achieves enlightenment. Meanwhile, the Ninja Force and King Olav celebrate the successful completion of Operation Saga Night with a feast and take a picture with banners saying "Mission Accomplished".

== Cast ==
- Mads Ousdal as Arne Treholt
- Jon Øigarden as Otto Meyer
- Trond-Viggo Torgersen as King Olav V
- Linn Stokke as Ragnhild Umbraco
- Amund Maarud as Bumblebee
- Martinus Grimstad Olsen as Black Peter
- Øyvind Venstad Kjeksrud as Øystein Fjellberg
- Henrik Horge as Kusken

== Production ==
In December 2008 the Norwegian Film Institute gave a support to film project made by Cappelen Malling with NOK 10.5 million, in spite of the fact that the author had no previous experience from the movie industry. The book forms the basis for the film, where an alternative universe-Treholt leads a group of ninjas set up by then-King Olav V to combat the Soviets. The original working title was Nytt norsk håp ("New Norwegian Hope"), and the total budget was NOK 19 million. The producers describe the story as taking place directly before Treholt's arrest in 1984, presenting "the true story of how Commander Arne Treholt and his Ninja Force saved Norway during the Cold War". Cappelen Malling himself describes the film as "alternative history", but only in the sense that all history is alternative. Treholt himself has allegedly given his consent to both the book and the movie.

The absurd premise of the film secured a great deal of media attention for it ahead of its release. Aftenposten, in January 2010, predicted it would be one of the most absurd works of Norwegian cinema. Verdens Gang quoted producer Eric Vogel, saying that "something like this has never been made in Norway before. Or in the world, as far as I know!" They also interviewed Mads Ousdal, who portrayed Treholt in the film, describing the role as very different from anything he had done previously. Comedian Trond Viggo Torgersen played the part of King Olav V.

== Reception ==
Although the movie was not a big box-office success, it did receive some very good reviews. J.S. Marcus of The Wall Street Journal: "Hilarious and menacing, absurd and insightful, and an accomplished work of genre film making that authoritatively upends the cold-war spy thriller".

== See also ==
- Operation Gladio, an anti-communist stay-behind operation that ran in a number of NATO countries as well as neutral states after WWII
