= Ulf Underland =

Norwegian barrister

Ulf Underland (1928 – 1 November 2012) was a Norwegian barrister.

He took the cand.jur. degree in 1953, and was hired in the Ministry of Foreign Affairs. He was stationed in Paris, Bangkok and Vienna before being promoted to assistant secretary in 1967. In 1971 he became a barrister with access to work with Supreme Court cases, and became a partner in the law firm Arntzen, Underland & Co, today named Arntzen de Besche. He is best known as the defender of Arne Treholt in 1984–1985, together with Jon Lyng and Andreas Arntzen.

He resided in Ski. He died in November 2012.
