= Ousdal =

Ousdal is a surname. Notable people with the surname include:

- Mads Ousdal (born 1970), Norwegian actor
- Sverre Anker Ousdal (1944–2026), Norwegian actor, father of Mads
