= Ørnulf Tofte =

Norwegian police officer (1922–2020)

Assistant Chief of Police Ørnulf Tofte

Head of Counter-Intelligence, Norwegian Police Surveillance Agency
- In office ?–1987

Personal details
- Born: 12 February 1922 Kristiania, Norway
- Died: 26 August 2020 (aged 98) Bærum, Norway
- Profession: Police officer

Ørnulf Tofte (12 February 1922 – 26 August 2020) was a Norwegian police officer and a major figure in the Norwegian intelligence service during the Cold War. He served as assistant chief of police and head of counter-intelligence in the Police Surveillance Agency. Tofte uncovered several illegal Soviet spies and personally arrested Asbjørn Sunde, Gunvor Galtung Haavik and Arne Treholt. Tofte was widely recognized for his role during the Cold War, and received the King's Medal of Merit in Gold in 1987. He published the biography Spaneren in the same year.

== Personal life ==
Tofte was born in Kristiania, a son of Tor and Gudrun Tofte. He was married to Odlaug Larsen. He died in Bærum on 26 August 2020, at the age of 98.

== Career ==
Tofte graduated from the police academy in March 1940 and joined the police force as a constable. During World War II, he took part in the resistance during 1940. In 1942 he fled to Sweden and served in the Norwegian police troops in Sweden until the end of the war. In 1948, he joined the Police Surveillance Agency. He was promoted to sergeant in 1952 and inspector in 1954. He eventually rose to become Assistant Chief of Police and Head of Counter-Intelligence, reporting directly to the Director of the Police Surveillance Agency.

Tofte was involved in the investigations of all the three major spy cases in Norway during the Cold War: The Sunde case, the Haavik case and the Treholt case. He personally arrested all three and headed the investigations of the Haavik and Treholt cases. He has said that "Treholt's abilities to manipulate people around him are the reason why the Treholt case is still kept alive".

Tofte has stated that "for me there is a line from 9 April 1940, the German invasion, to the fight against communism. Both are about fighting for democracy, and against dictatorship." In 2016 interview, he stated that Norway and the West are in a New Cold War with Russia.

In his last interview in April 2020 Tofte discussed the COVID-19 pandemic and earlier crises he has experienced during the Great Depression, the Second World War and the Cold War.

== Biography ==
In 1987 he published his autobiography, Spaneren.

== Honours ==
He received the King's Medal of Merit in Gold upon his retirement in 1987.

== Publications ==
- Ørnulf Tofte: Spaneren: Overvåkning for rikets sikkerhet, Gyldendal Norsk Forlag, 1987, ISBN 82-05-17390-7
