= Ole Martin Høystad =

Norwegian Soviet spy (born 1947)

- Born: 16 November 1947 (age 78)
- Status: Released
- Convictions: Treason and espionage on behalf of the Soviet Union
- Penalty: 7 years imprisonment

Ole Martin Høystad (born 1947) is a Norwegian convicted Soviet spy who became known for his role in the Soviet infiltration of the Norwegian embassy in Moscow, where he worked as a guard. He was arrested in 1972 and convicted of treason and espionage by Eidsivating Court of Appeal the following year. The Høystad case received significant media coverage in the 1970s and was one of three major espionage cases in Norway in the last two decades of the Cold War, preceding the Haavik case and the Treholt case. The verdict said Høystad had "grossly violated the duties and loyalty he owed his country, with consequences that in a given situation could have been catastrophic." While serving his 7-year sentence, he graduated in literature, and upon release from prison he became a lecturer at Telemark University College (now the University of South-Eastern Norway), where he later was promoted to professor in cultural studies.
