= Jon Øigarden =

Norwegian actor

- Born: 31 May 1971 (age 55); Oslo, Norway
- Occupation: Actor
- Years active: 1998–present
- Spouse: Caroline Giertsen (m. 2001)
- Children: 3
- Relatives: Thomas Giertsen (brother-in-law)

Jon Øigarden (born 31 May 1971) is a Norwegian actor, who is well known for his role as journalist Peter Verås in the TV series Mammon, Jarl Varg in Norsemen, and other Norwegian films.

== Career ==
Jon Øigarden was educated at the Norwegian National Academy of Theatre, and has acted both on stage and on screen. Between 1997 and 1999 he worked at Oslo Nye Teater. Among the plays he has acted in is Mirandolina by Carlo Goldoni and an adaptation of Graham Greene's Travels with My Aunt, and he has had roles in such movies as Detektor (2000) and the comedy Get Ready to Be Boyzvoiced (2000). Øigarden has been cast to portray the Norwegian war criminal Henry Rinnan on film; the filming was planned to start some time in 2009. For a while he both ran and acted in the theater Torshovteateret, with his colleagues Mads Ousdal and Trond Espen Seim.

From 2019 to 2023, Øigarden played Jeppe Schøitt in Exit, a series in 3 seasons that described the decadent lives of 4 men in Oslo's finance elites. It became the most streamed in the history of Norwegian national television. He is also well known for his outstanding role as Jarl Varg in Norsemen.

== Selected filmography ==
- 1732 Høtten (1998)
- Lyckliga gatan (1999) (TV)
- Sofies verden (1999)
- Detektor (2000)
- Get Ready to Be Boyzvoiced (2000)
- Gymnaslærer Pedersen (2006)
- Berlinerpoplene (2007) (TV)
- A Somewhat Gentle Man (2010)
- Norwegian Ninja (2010)
- Fuck Up (2012)
- In Order of Disappearance (2014)
- Norsemen (TV series) (2016–2020)
- 22 July (2018)
- Lords of Chaos (2018)
- Wisting (TV series) (2019)
- A Storm for Christmas (TV miniseries) (2022)
- The Battle of Oslo (2025)
- The Rookie episode Czech Mate (2026)
