= Eyvind Getz =

Norwegian barrister and mayor of Oslo

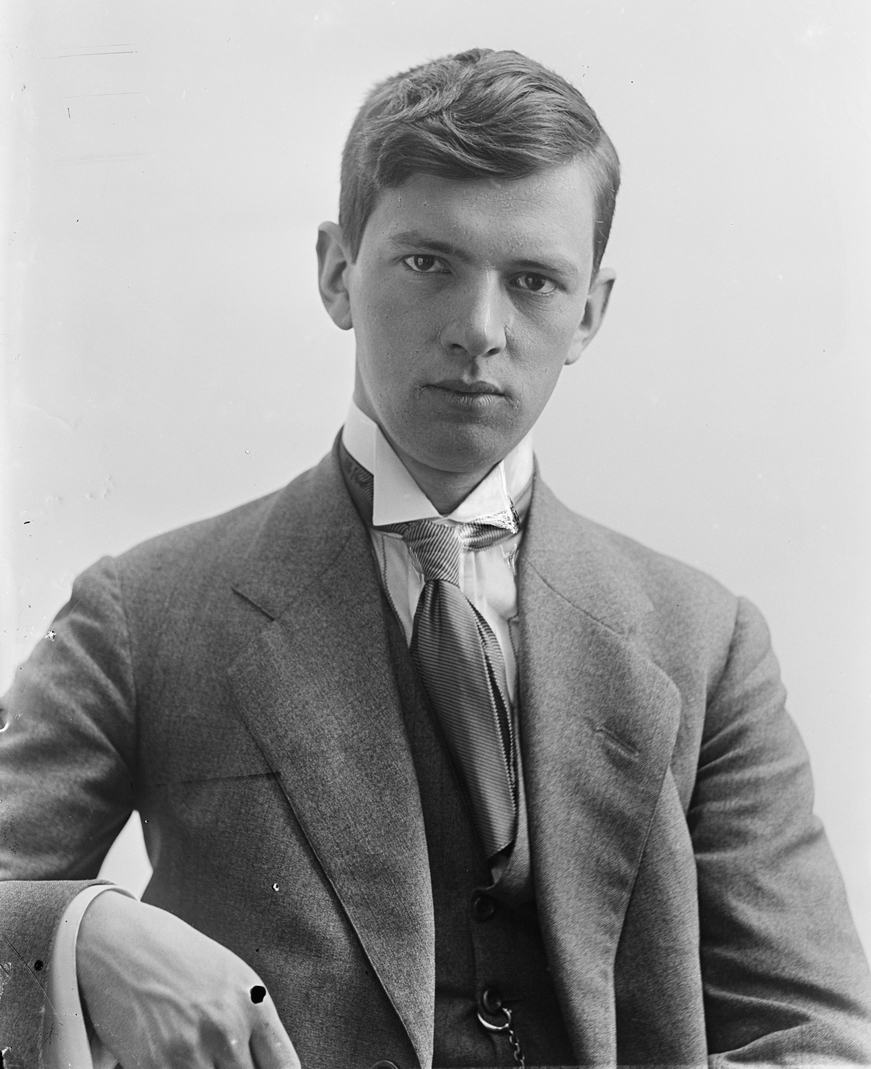

Eyvind Getz (1888–1956) was a Norwegian barrister and mayor of Oslo, Norway.

He was born in Kristiania (now Oslo), Norway. He was a son of jurist Bernhard Getz (1850–1901) and Johanne Christiane Fredrikke Berg (1855–1924). He earned his cand.jur. from the University of Kristiania in 1911.

He was a barrister by profession and was associated with the firm of Blom, Koss & Nielsen from 1915 to 1920. He established his own law firm in 1920. He was a member of the Oslo City Council from 1922, served deputy mayor from 1927 to 1928 and was Mayor of Oslo from 1932 to 1934. He was Deputy Governor of Norges Kommunalbank Board from 1927 and was also chair of Oslo Kinematografer from 1932 to 1934.

Political offices
Preceded by Adolf Indrebø	Mayor of Oslo; 1932–1934	Succeeded by Oscar Torp
Cultural offices
Preceded by Kristoffer Aamot	Chair of Oslo Kinematografer; 1932–1934	Succeeded by Rachel Grepp
