= Finn Lützow-Holm =

Norwegian military officer (1890–1950)

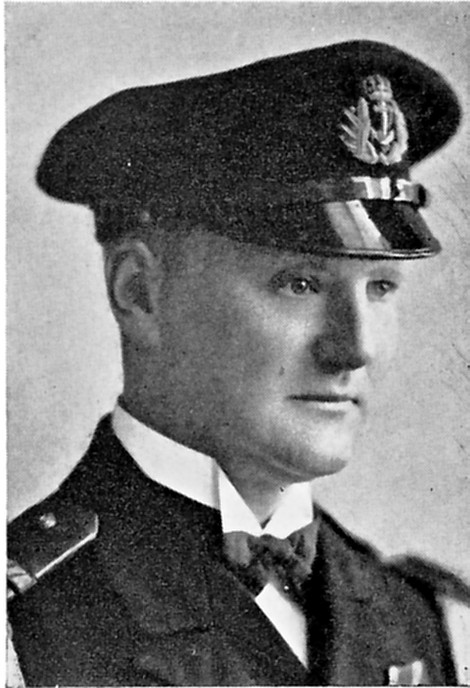
- Lützow-Holm in the 1930s
- Born: 1890; Nesseby, Norway
- Died: 1950 (aged 59–60)
- Allegiance: Norway
- Service years: 1912-1950
- Commands: Royal Norwegian Navy Air Service
- Other work: Polar exploration

Finn Trond Lützow-Holm (28 May 1890 – 4 June 1950) was a Norwegian military officer, aviation pioneer and polar explorer.

He was born in Nesseby Municipality as a son of priest and politician Ole Arntzen Lützow-Holm (1853–1936) and Anne Marie Riddervold Jensen (1855–1934). His mother was a daughter of Peter Andreas Jensen and granddaughter of Hans Riddervold. In May 1918 he married headmaster's daughter Birgit Lund (1893–1983). Their daughter, named Birgit as well, married Alv Johnsen.

Finn Lützow-Holm took part in the air surveyance of the Bouvet Island and of the Queen Maud Land in 1929 and 1931, together with Hjalmar Riiser-Larsen. He was commander of the Royal Norwegian Navy Air Service from 1938.

== Decorations and awards ==
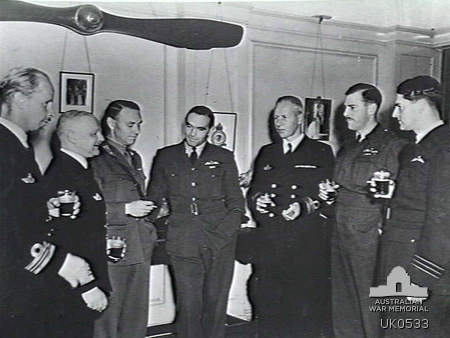
Lützow-Holm (no. 2 from the left) in Scotland in 1943

- Knight 1st Class of the Order of St. Olav - 1929
- Defence Medal 1940–1945
- Haakon VII 70th Anniversary Medal
- Norwegian Aero Club's gold medal,
- Gunnerus Medal in silver,
- French Legion of Honour
- Italian Al Valor Aeronautica

== See also ==
- Lützow-Holm Bay
