= Geir Bergkastet =

Norwegian cultural director

Geir Bergkastet (born 6 May 1961) is a Norwegian cultural director.

Bergkastet completed his education in economics at Rogaland University College in 1995, worked as treasurer at the Norwegian School of Veterinary Science from 1986 to 1988 and as a consultant at the Norwegian National Academy of Theatre from 1988 to 1996. He then worked at Rogaland Teater from 1996 to 2002 and Nationaltheatret from 2003 to 2006, and was the managing director of the Oslo Kino cinema company from 2006 to 2013. In 2013 he became director of the Lillehammer University College.

He resides in Moelv.

Cultural offices
Preceded by Cecilie Trøan (acting)	Director of Oslo Kino; 2006–2013	Succeeded by Morten Valestrand (acting)
