= Fuck Up =

- Film poster
- Directed by: Øystein Karlsen
- Starring: Jon Øigarden; Tuva Novotny
- Release date: 16 March 2012
- Running time: 96 minutes
- Country: Norway
- Language: Norwegian

Fuck Up is a 2012 Norwegian comedy film directed by Øystein Karlsen.

== Cast ==
- Jon Øigarden as Jack
- Tuva Novotny as Robin
- Anders Baasmo Christiansen as Rasmussen
- Atle Antonsen as Glen
- Lennart Jähkel as Leopold
- Rebecka Hemse as Rebecca
- Iben Hjejle as Malin
