= Ingebjørg Sem =

Norwegian actress (1931–2009)

Ingebjørg Sem (1 November 1931 – 31 May 2009) was a Norwegian actress.

== Life and career ==
She was born in Buffalo, New York as a daughter of dr. Mathias Øvrom Sem (1891–1971) and Solveig Camilla Svensson (1897–1978). In 1952 she married actor Tor Stokke (1928–2003). They had the daughter Linn Stokke.

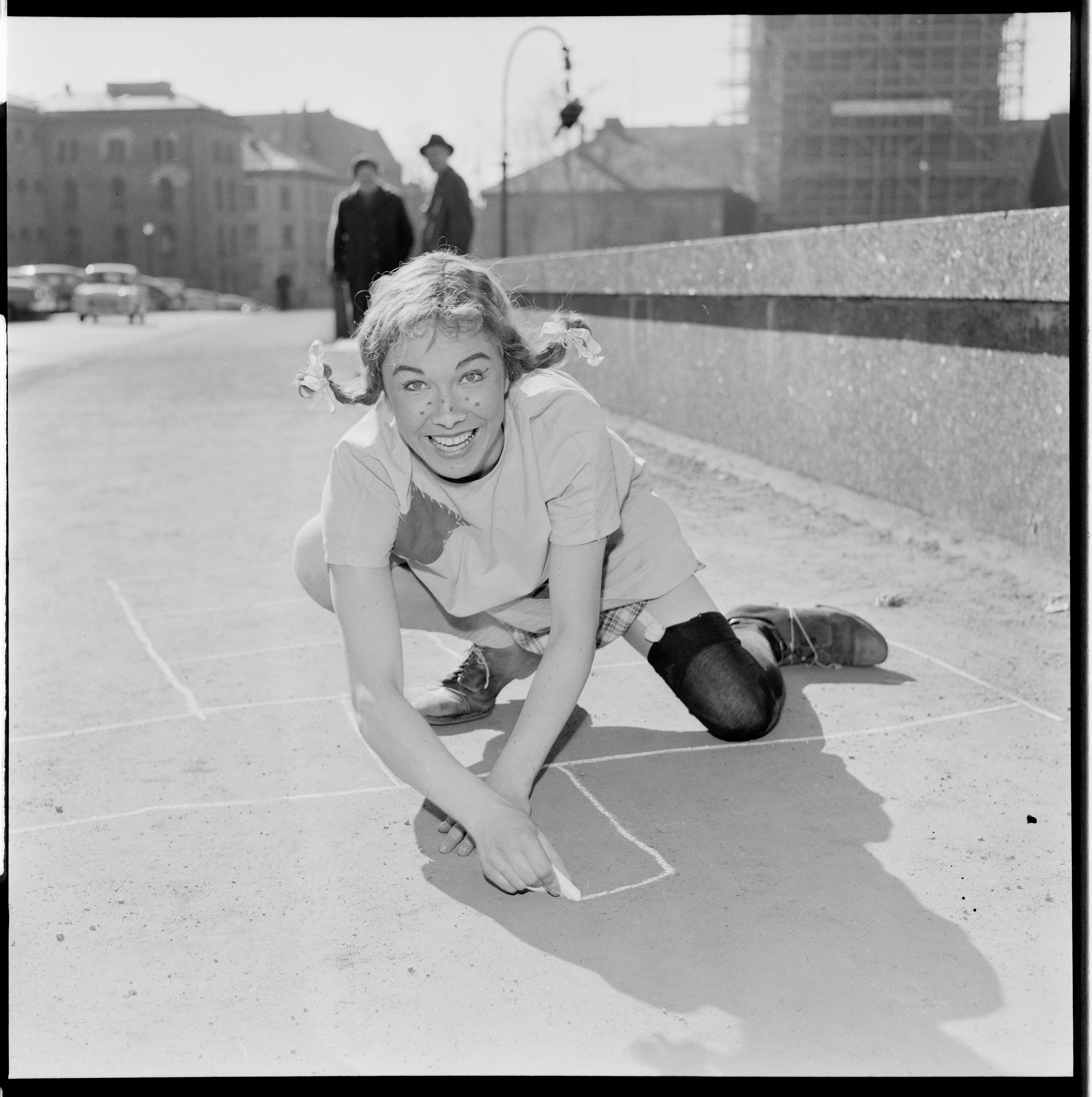
Ingebjørg Sem in character as Pippi Longstocking. The photo was taken for Billedbladet NÅ magazine 30 March 1958, when Pippi Longstocking was staged at Edderkoppen Theatre in Oslo, Norway.

She made her stage debut in 1951 at Trøndelag Teater. After 1955 she worked at Den Nationale Scene (1955–1957), Edderkoppen, Nationaltheatret and Det Norske Teatret (from 1962). She also contributed to Fjernsynsteatret and Radioteatret, and had supporting parts in films such as Millionær for en aften (1960), Hennes meget kongelige høyhet (1968) and Anton (1973). She founded Norsk Teaterforlag in 1977 and Seniorteatret in Oslo in 1985.
