= Detector (film) =

2000 Norwegian comedy film

Detektor
- Film poster
- Directed by: Pål Jackman
- Written by: Erlend Loe
- Produced by: Edward A. Dreyer
- Starring: Mads Ousdal
- Distributed by: Sandrew Metronome
- Release date: 25 August 2000
- Running time: 104 minutes
- Country: Norway
- Language: Norwegian
- Budget: $900,000
- Box office: $1 million (Norway)

Detector is a 2000 Norwegian comedy film directed by Pål Jackman from a screenplay by Erlend Loe and produced by Edward A. Dreyer. It was entered into the 23rd Moscow International Film Festival. The film was very successful in Norway, grossing over $1 million.

== Cast ==
- Mads Ousdal as Daniel Jor
- Hildegun Riise as Daniel's Mother
- Ingjerd Egeberg as Janne / Silje
- Allan Svensson as Max
- Harald Eia as Ronny
- Jon Øigarden as Kenneth
- Sverre Porsanger as Ante
- Kristoffer Joner as Jørgen
- Svein Sturla Hungnes as Gordon
- Nina Andresen Borud as Hege Drag (as Nina Andresen)
- Hans Eirik Voktor as Martinsen

== Release ==
The film opened in Norway on 25 August 2000 on 31 screens and grossed Norwegian krone 1,842,841 ($0.2 million) from 29,680 admissions in its opening weekend.
