= Andreas Arntzen (barrister) =

Norwegian barrister

Andreas Arntzen (1 June 1928 – 21 May 2012) was a Norwegian barrister.

He was a son of Sven Arntzen and father of presiding judge Wenche Elizabeth Arntzen.

He took the cand.jur. degree in 1952, studied at Harvard Law School and was a lecturer at the Faculty of Law, University of Oslo. In 1960 he became a barrister with access to work with Supreme Court cases. He was hired in the law firm founded by his father, today named Arntzen de Besche. He is best known as the defender of Arne Treholt in 1984–1985, together with Jon Lyng and Ulf Underland. From 1987 to 1989 he led the commission that delivered the Norwegian Official Report 1989: 2, scrutinizing the bankruptcy of Kongsberg Våpenfabrikk. He died in May 2012.
