= Pål Jackman =

Norwegian film director and musician (born 1967)

- Born: 20 September 1967 (age 58); Haugesund, Norway
- Occupations: Film director, musician
- Years active: 1998-present

Pål Jackman (born 20 September 1967, in Haugesund, Norway) is a Norwegian film director and musician.

As a musician he appears under the name Jackman, both as a solo artist and with his own alternative rock trio. In the trio format has with him his brother Morten Jackman on drums and John Lilja on bass. The trio has released an EP and an album, both named Jackman. He has also previously served as the frontman and songwriter in the band Wunderkammer who released two albums.

Jackman has directed shorts and advertising films and received attention for his first short film, Benny – a playful and easygoing film in both style and content. Jackman studied television and direction at the University College in Stavanger, and has also enjoyed significant success with his Gypsy-inspired orchestra Wunderkammer. Jackman and Wunderkammer have also written the score for several shorts and documentaries. Jackman made his feature debut in 2000 with Detector. The film was entered into the 23rd Moscow International Film Festival. He has since written and directed one of the 5 short films in 5 grøss fra Vestlandet (5 horrors of Western Norway) and his second feature-length film, Jernanger, which premiered in 2009.

== Discography ==
=== Wunderkammer ===
- Wunderkammer (1999)
- Today I Cannot Hear Music (2002)
- B-sides (2003)

=== Jackman ===
- Jackman EP (2005)
- Jackman (2006)

== Filmography ==
- Benny (1998)
- Detector (2000)
- 5 grøss fra Vestlandet (2007)
- Shooting the Sun (US title: The Storm in My Heart) Norwegian title Jernanger (2009)
