= Radio Gaga =

Norwegian comic strip

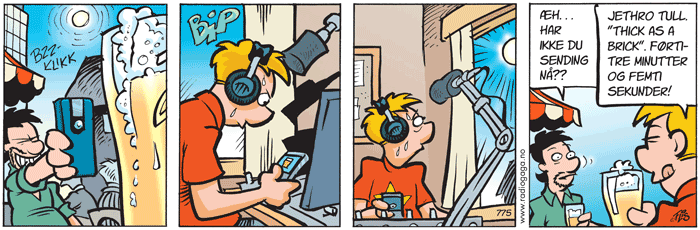
Strip #775 of Radio Gaga. ("Uh... Don't you have a broadcast?" "Jethro Tull's Thick as a Brick. Forty-three minutes and fifty seconds.")

Radio Gaga is a comic strip created by the Norwegian humourist "Flis" (Øyvind Sagåsen).

The series started in 2001, and is about characters who run a local radio station called Radio Gaga. Although the action takes place in the radio environment, it is mostly about the somewhat eccentric characters, and not so much about radio. Since 2008 it was published in the Pondus magazine, and in the newspapers Aftenposten and Nordlys, as well as in a number of smaller publications.
