= Alv Johnsen =

Norwegian resistance leader and physician

Alv Marius Johnsen (26 January 1919 – 14 January 1986) was a Norwegian resistance member, physician and military leader.

== Early life ==
Johnsen was born in Lier, Norway, the son of Alv I. Johnsen (1885–1943) and Else Marie Johnsen (1890–1969). He took his examen artium in 1938.

== Career ==
=== Military service ===
When World War II reached Norway in 1940, Johnsen participated in the Battle of Bagn. After Norway's defeat, he helped establish an illegal newspaper. In the autumn of 1941, he had to flee to the United Kingdom through Sweden, Russia, India and Canada. He joined the Norwegian Independent Company 1, and served on a motor torpedo boat from May to December 1944, and was parachuted to Norway in early 1945. He was an instructor for Milorg until the war's end.

He met his wife in the United Kingdom in 1944, Birgit "Tullen" Lützow-Holm. She worked as a secretary at the intelligence office FO II in London during the war, and she was decorated with the Defence Medal 1940–1945. The couple had three children. Birgit was a daughter of aviation pioneer and commander Finn Lützow-Holm and granddaughter of Ole Arntzen Lützow-Holm.

=== Medicine ===
In 1950 Alv Johnsen graduated with the cand.med. degree, and he was a specialist in rheumatology from 1963. He worked at Lillehammer Hospital, Ullevål Hospital and Diakonhjemmet Hospital from 1954 to 1958, then at the Rheumatic Hospital from 1958 to 1963.

He started working as a physician for the Norwegian Army in 1953, and became assisting chief physician in the Army Staff in 1957. He held the rank of captain, advanced to lieutenant colonel in 1958 and major general in 1972. He served as sanitary leader for the United Nations Operation in Gaza (1958) and United Nations Operation in the Congo (1960). From 1972 to 1979 he served as the leader of Norwegian Armed Forces Medical Corps. He was also a member of the disaster preparedness council Norsk Katastroferåd.

Johnsen was awarded several decorations, including the Defence Medal 1940–1945, the Haakon VII 70th Anniversary Medal, the British Defence Medal, the 1939–45 Star and the France and Germany Star. He was also decorated as a Commander of the Order of St. Olav.

== Death ==
Johnsen died in January 1986 and was buried at Vestre gravlund.
