= Eivind Hjelmtveit =

Norwegian cultural administrator

Eivind Hjelmtveit (16 August 1926 – 11 February 2017) was a Norwegian cultural administrator.

He was born in Eydehavn, and attended school in Arendal and Sandefjord. He started his career at Riksteatret in 1950 as a secretary, and was the director of Riksteatret from 1968 to 1975 and later Oslo Kinematografer from 1975 to 1993. He was also behind the establishment of Hålogaland Teater in 1971 and also Teatret Vårt and Teater Ibsen. He is decorated as a Knight of the French Ordre des Arts et des Lettres. He resided in Frogner, Oslo. Hjelmtveit died in his hometown on 11 February 2017, aged 90.

Cultural offices
Preceded by Frits von der Lippe	Director of the Riksteatret; 1968–1975	Succeeded by Gudrun Waadeland
Preceded by Arnljot Engh	Director of Oslo Kinematografer; 1975–1993	Succeeded by Ingeborg Moræus Hanssen
