= Thomas Cappelen Malling =

Norwegian author and director (born 1970)

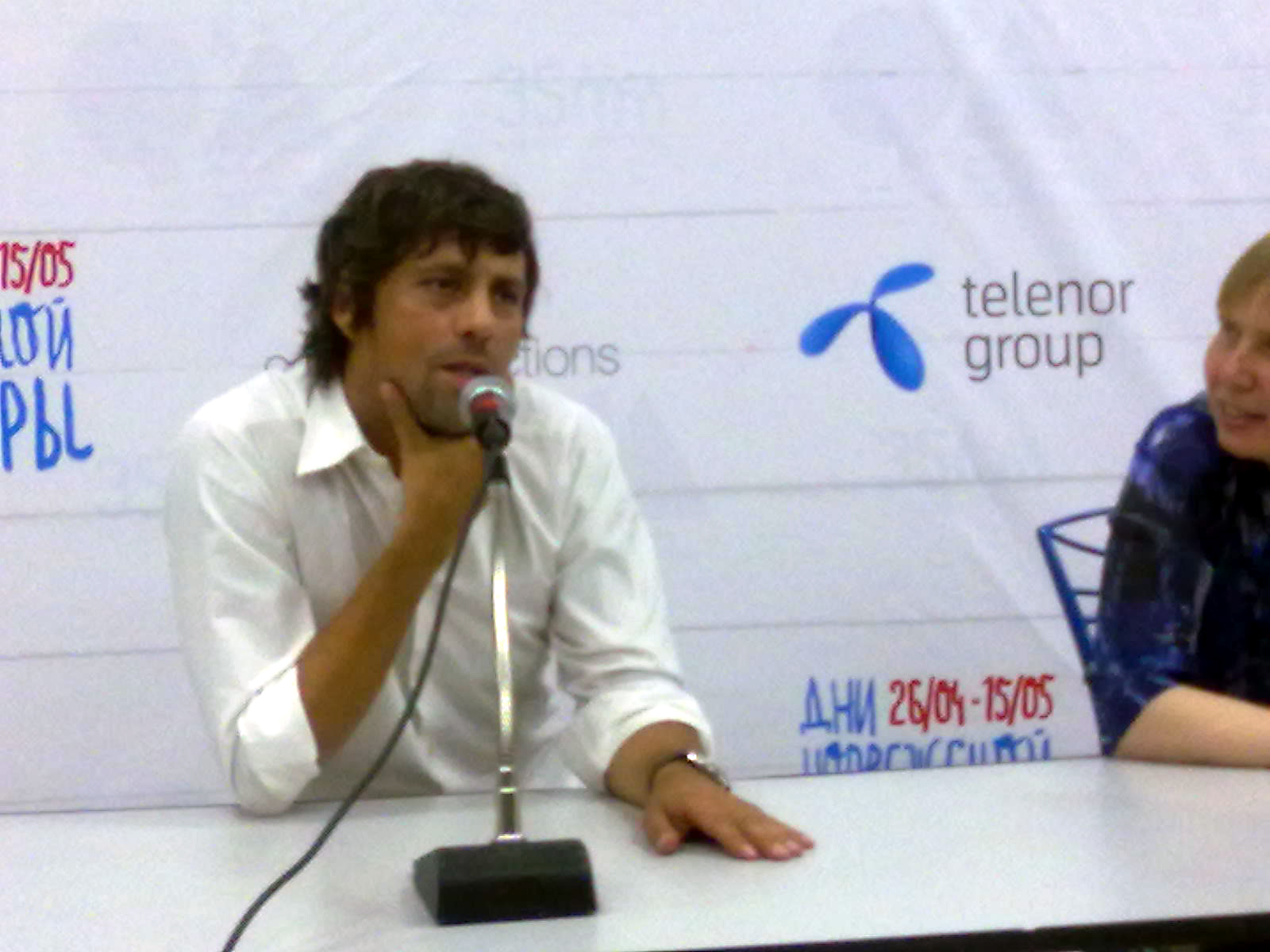
- Malling speaking at a Telenor conference in 2011.
- Born: Thomas Cappelen Malling; 16 December 1970 (age 54); Kongsvinger, Hedmark, Norway
- Occupation(s): Author, Screenwriter, Director
- Years active: 2004–present

Thomas Cappelen Malling (born 16 December 1970) is a Norwegian author and director, born in Kongsvinger. He hails from the communications industry, where he worked in strategic planning.

In 2006, Malling wrote the book Ninjateknikk II. Usynlighet i strid 1978 (English: Ninja Technique II: Invisibility in combat 1978). The book was presented as a military manual written in 1978 by Arne Treholt, who in 1985 was convicted of high treason and espionage on behalf of the Soviet Union and Iraq.

In spite of the fact that he had no previous experience from the movie industry, in December 2008 Malling received 10.5 million kr in support from the Norwegian Film Institute to make a film based on the book. In the film, slated for release in August 2010 under the title Norwegian Ninja (Norwegian: Kommandør Treholt & ninjatroppen), an alternative universe-Treholt leads a group of ninjas set up by then-King Olav V to combat the Soviets. Treholt allegedly gave his consent to write both the book and the movie.
