= Linn Stokke =

Norwegian actress, author, singer and composer

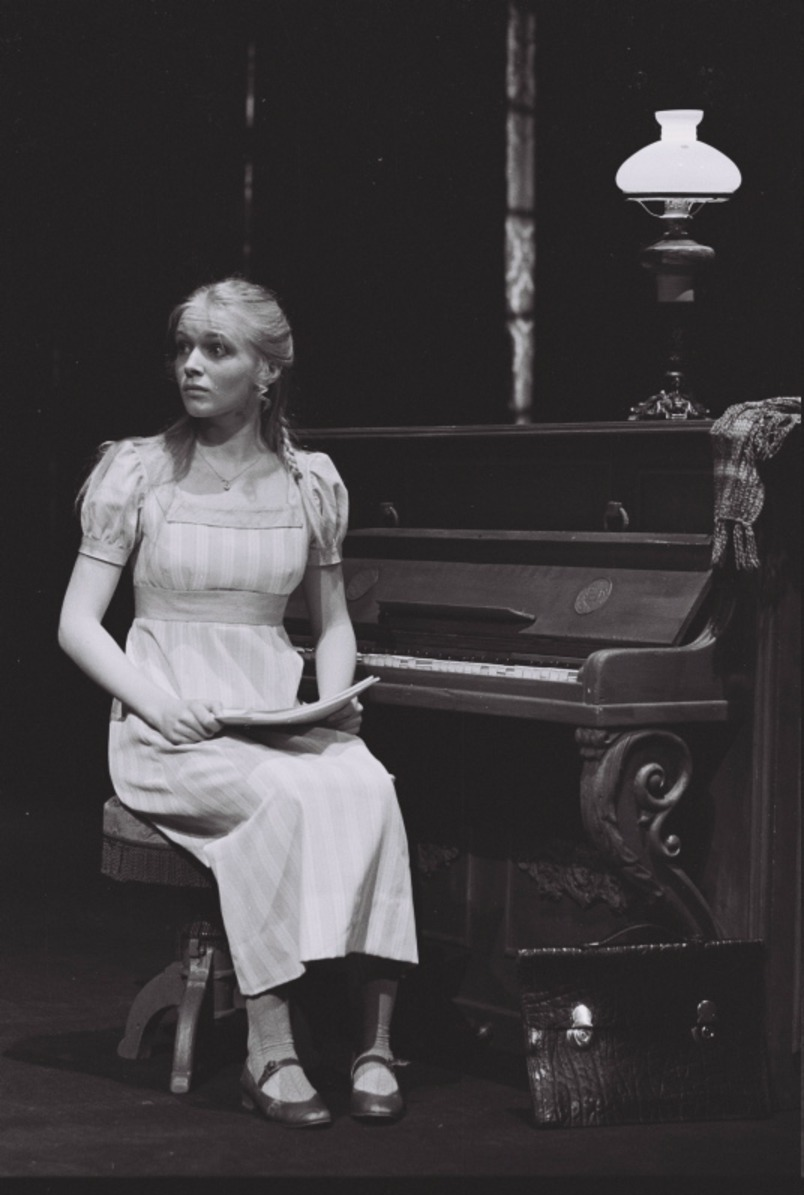
- As Frida Foldal in Ibsen's John Gabriel Borkman at Nationaltheatret in 1979
- Born: Linn Sem Stokke; September 18, 1961 (age 64); Oslo, Østlandet, Norway
- Occupations: Actress, author, composer, singer, cultural director
- Years active: 1975–present
- Spouse: Atle Brynestad (1990–)
- Awards: Stockholm hometown cultural price 2001
- Website: http://www.linnstokke.com/

Linn Sem Stokke (born 18 September 1961) is a Norwegian actress, author, singer and composer.

She is the daughter of Ingebjørg Sem and Tor Stokke, both actors. She had her début at the National Theatre as a child, in 1975, and has since acted in over 25 productions there. Stokke became known to a national audience at a young age, in the role of the daughter in the sitcom Hjemme hos oss in 1980. She has also worked in international productions, such as Mio min Mio (1987) and the Swedish Om kärlek (1987) See UTUBE

In 2006 Stokke released her first album, Unfolding, described as "jazz-inspired singer/songwriter-pop with more than a little hint of new age." In 2007 she was asked to compose and perform the signature melody for "Symposia 07 and the silent prayer for the earth" These two songs, "Breathing Love" and "The New Day", are only available on iTunes and www.linnstokke.com She has also written two books: Tanker fra en sorg (Thoughts from a grief) – a collection of poems – and the children's book Trollet Trym og den hemmelige farven, which has also been translated to Japanese. In 2006 the book was reprinted by GyldendalGood books. The book has also been filmed for television. Linn lived for seven years with the actor Hans Ola Sørlie, who died in a car accident in 1988. She is currently married to the entrepreneur Atle Brynestad, and in 1997 quit her job at the National Theatre to "set her self free", as she said. Stokke has two children with her first husband, and two with her second.

== Select filmography ==
Year 2010	Film	Role	Other notes
1980	Hjemme hos oss	Sissel	TV
1982	A Time to Die	Dora	
1987	Om kärlek	Helene Berg	
1987	Hip hip hurra!	Oda	
1987	Mio min Mio	Mrs. Lundin	
1988	Borgen skole	Brita Sand	TV
2010	Norwegian Ninja		
