= Vegard Bye =

Norwegian politician (born 1951)

Vegard Bye (born 19 March 1951) is a Norwegian political scientist, writer, consultant and ex-politician. He has represented the UN High Commissioner for Human Rights in Angola and Bolivia, written extensively on Latin America, and is a consultant specializing on human rights, democracy, conflict and post-conflict societies as well as solar energy. He served as a Substitute Representative (Vararepresentant) to the Norwegian Parliament for the Socialist Left Party from Oslo (1993-1997), meeting in the Standing Committee on Foreign Affairs.

== Career history ==
Vegard Bye holds a Dr.philos in Political Science from the University of Oslo (2019), and an MA from the same university (1977). He has a life-long history working on North-South issues with Latin America as his special area of expertise. His professional experiences include journalism and writing, solidarity work, civil service (in Norwegian government and the UN), leadership positions in NGOs (Norwegian People's Aid and Norwegian Forum for Development and the Environment), academic work (Peace Research Institute of Oslo – PRIO, Norwegian Institute of International Affairs – NUPI, and the Department of Political Science at the University of Oslo), consultancy and senior positions in UN field operations. He was the only Norwegian reporter to cover the Nicaraguan Revolution in 1979, and he subsequently reported on the civil wars in Central America during larger parts of the 1980s. In 1990 – 1992, he was the Head of Norad´s (The Norwegian Agency for Development Cooperation) Latin America Bureau. In 1993 – 1995 he was the Executive Director of ForUM, the Norwegian umbrella organization of approximately 50 NGOs responsible for international civil society advocacy on development and environmental issues i.a. at international summits and conferences. In 1996 he founded and was the Executive Director of the consulting group NORLAT (Nordic-Latin America Resource Group). He was the Representative of the UN High Commissioner for Human Rights in Angola (2004-2008) and in Bolivia (first representative of a new office 2008), in both cases also leading the UN Human Rights country office and being a member of the UN Country Team. Since 2009 he has been a partner with the Oslo-based consulting company Scanteam, leading or being part of a large number of evaluations and other assignments regarding international development cooperation, mostly in the areas of human rights, democracy, good governance, corporate social responsibility, media development and natural resource management. As a consultant, he has carried out almost 80 assignments since 1996, of which 40 as Team Leader, being responsible for international, multi-sector, complex evaluations, particularly in conflict / post-conflict situations (See CV)

Parallel to his consulting career, he held a position as Senior Research Fellow at the Centre for Development and the Environment (SUM) at the University of Oslo, where he was coordinating an academic cooperation program with Cuba and worked on a research project on political implications of Cuba's reform process (see list of publications ). This project led to the defense of his Dr.philos degree in 2019, with the following dissertation: The End of an Era – or a New Start? Economic Reforms with Potential for Political Transformation in Cuba on Raúl Castro’s Watch (2008-2018). He served as a deputy representative to the Norwegian Parliament for the Socialist Left Party from Oslo during the term 1993-1997 . In 1976, he was the co-founder of the Norwegian Solidarity Network with Latin America (Latin-Amerikagruppene I Norge, LAG), and from 1982 – 1986 he was the first President of the Central America Solidarity Council.

== Publications ==
=== Articles ===
- Vegard Bye (2014): The Politics of Cuban Transformation — What Space for Authoritarian Withdrawal?, in ASCE: Cuba in Transition, Volume 22, Papers and Proceedings from the Twenty-Second Annual Meeting
- Vegard Bye (2014):Possible Political Transformations in Cuba in the Light of Some Theoretical and Empirically Comparative Elements, in ASCE: Cuba in Transition, Volume 23, Papers and Proceedings from the Twenty-Third Annual Meeting
- Vegard Bye (2014): Which Way Cuba?, in the NUPI Report (2014) Which Way Cuba? Political transformations, social deterioration and attempted dialogue
- Vegard Bye (2015): Political Implications of Recent Economic Reform Trends in Cuba: The 2014 Status, in ASCE: Cuba in Transition, Volume 24, Papers and Proceedings from the Twenty-fourth Annual Meeting
- Vegard Bye (2015): The End of ´Plattismo´?, in: Eric Hershberg and William LeoGrande (eds): Implications of Normalization: Scholarly Perspectives on U.S. – Cuban Normalization, Center for Latin American & Latino Studies at American University and the Cuba Program at the Social Science Research Council
- Vegard Bye (2016): “The Great Paradox: how Obama's opening to Cuba may imperil the country's reform process”, in: Third World Quarterly, Vol. 37, No. 9, 1698-1712
- Vegard Bye (2017): “Cuba's Critical Juncture: Main Challenges”. Iberoamericana - Nordic Journal of Latin American and Nordic Studies. 46 (1), pp. 109–118. DOI http://doi.org/10.16993/iberoamericana.214

=== Books ===
- Mellom-Amerika: Når vulkanen våkner. Oslo: Universitetsforlaget. 1982. (With photos by Aslak Aarhus)
- Forbudenfred. Det store spillet om Mellom-Amerika i åtti-åra. Oslo: Cappelen. 1990.
- La Paz Prohibida. El laberinto centroamericano en la década de los ochenta. San José, Costa Rica: DEI. 1991.
- Dette er Cuba – alt annet er løgn (together with Dag Hoel) (7th ed.). Oslo: Spartacus. 2014. Translation available as Estoes Cuba – lo demás es cuento. Ediciones La Otra Cuba. Ciudad de Mexico. 1998.
- Bolívars uekte sønner – Det nye Sør-Amerika mellom Chávez og Lula. Oslo: Spartacus. 2010.
- Cuba, from Fidel to Raúl and Beyond. New York and London: Palgrave Macmillan. 2019.

• OLE - fra Rendalen til den meksikanske revolusjon. Kolofon, Oslo, 2021

• Hvor ble det av solidariteten? Gjenreising av det global fellesskapet. Redaktør med Olle Tørnquist. Kolofon, Oslo, 2023

• Angola after dos Santos. An Anthology on Continuity and Change. Co-editor. Chr. Michelsen Institute, Bergen, 2025

• Angola pós-dos Santos. Uma antologia sobre continuidade e mudança. Chr. Michelsen Institute, Bergen, 2025
