= Holly Arntzen =

Canadian singer, dulcimerist, and pianist

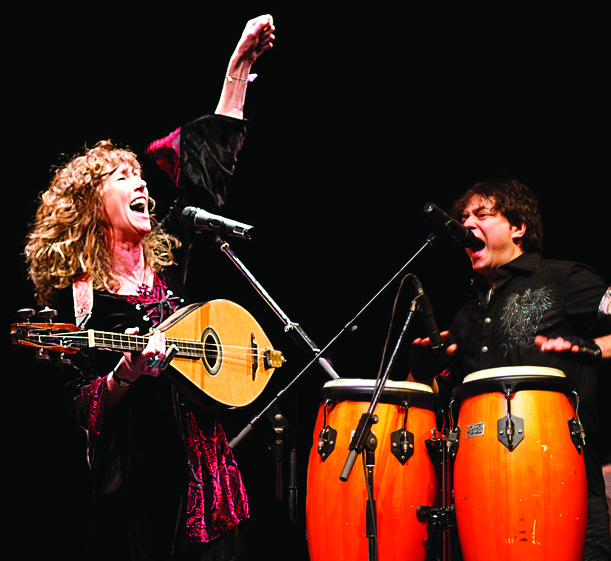
- Holly Arntzen and Kevin Wright of The Wilds

Background information
- Born: 20 August 1953 (age 72)
- Origin: Vancouver, British Columbia, Canada
- Occupations: Singer, instrumentalist
- Instruments: Vocals, dulcimer, piano
- Member of: The Wilds

Holly Arntzen is a singer, dulcimer player, and pianist from Vancouver, British Columbia, Canada. Holly Arntzen has been an active participant on the Salish Sea eco-music scene, forming The Wilds Band along with partner Kevin Wright.

Arntzen and Wright are the core of the Artist Response Team (ART), an independent production house that specializes in entertainment that educates about ecology.

They have generated significant awareness of the Salish Sea through their Voices Of Nature school music programs and a growing movement of Ecomusicology. In 2016 ART produced the first annual Rock The Salish Sea! Tour to seven communities including Victoria, Duncan, Nanaimo, Campbell River, Powell River, North Vancouver and Vancouver. The Wilds performed with large choirs of school children in professional theatre concerts, singing their original eco-rock songs, including Up Your Watershed, Salish Sea, 40 Million Salmon Can't Be Wrong, Waiting For Orca and I Am The Future.

In 2000 ART produced a CD called Salish Sea, featuring songs about ocean protection, followed two years later by the Salish Sea: Handbook for Educators (K-7). It was given the certification of "Provincially Recommended" by the British Columbia Ministry of Education and has been used by teachers throughout the province.

Their program to take the ecological message to children and schools around the Salish Sea is supported by The SHAW Centre of the Salish Sea, Cattle Point Foundation; and Western Washington's Salish Sea Studies Institute, Western Washington University.

Arntzen's family is a particularly musical one. In 2006, Gwendoline Records issued a live CD titled 3 Generations in Jazz, featuring Holly's father Lloyd Arntzen along with his two sons and two grandsons, recorded at Vancouver's Cellar Jazz Café. Holly performed with her father in the late '70s and early '80s singing traditional jazz and blues at Vancouver venues such as the Hot Jazz Club. She recorded Lloyd's original folk song, Where The Coho Flash Silver in 1979, and sang it at major folk festivals across Canada including the Vancouver, Edmonton, Calgary and Winnipeg Folk Festivals. In 2012 the Wilds performed the Coho Song at the Coho Festival in West Vancouver, along with Holly's nephews, Evan Arntzen (clarinet/sax) and Arnt Arntzen (banjo/guitar).

Arntzen plays a unique style of dulcimer. She got her first dulcimer in 1975; it was built on Cortes Island, by Klaus Maibauer—a highly skilled architect, carpenter, furniture builder and craftsman who built his own tools, including a band saw. He only ever made about 16 dulcimers. The early ones in the series were teardrop shaped and had pentatonic frets (which is what dulcimers traditionally have.) After playing it for a couple of years, Arntzen requested that Maibauer build one for her that had a slimmer neck (so she could hold it like a guitar) and diatonic frets to allow her to play more complex chords. This resulted in Arntzen's innovative dulcimer style. She plays it with a slide, and many different tunings.
