= Trond Fevolden =

Norwegian civil servant

Trond Fevolden (born 30 December 1951) is a Norwegian civil servant.

He graduated as cand.polit. in political science from the University of Oslo in 1980, and was hired as a subdirector in the Norwegian Office of the Prime Minister. He spent one year as deputy under-secretary of State before moving to the Ministry of Education, where he was permanent Secretary General from 1992 to 2016.
