= Mads Ousdal =

Norwegian actor

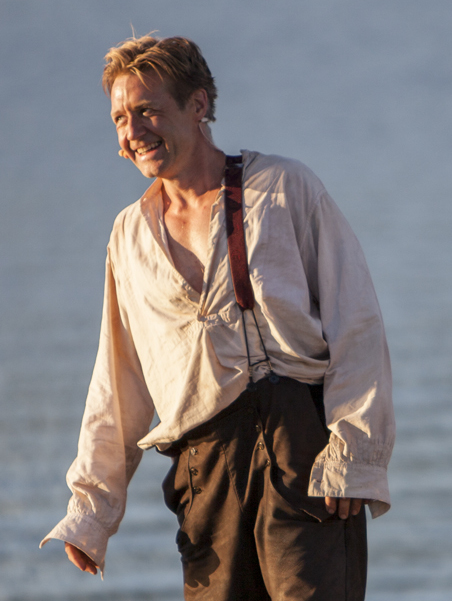
- Mads Ousdal as Peer Gynt in 2014
- Born: 8 December 1970
- Occupation: Actor
- Partner: Heidi Ruud Ellingsen
- Awards: Hedda Award for Best Actor in a Leading Role (2009)

Mads Ousdal (born 8 December 1970) is a Norwegian actor. He worked as an actor at Den Nationale Scene from 1996 to 1998, at Oslo Nye Teater from 1998 to 1999, and at Nationaltheatret from 2000. He played in the film Detector from 2000 and in Bryllupet from 2000, and has participated in television series, including Wisting. He also played Arne Treholt in the 2010 film Norwegian Ninja. He appeared in the 2013 film A Thousand Times Good Night.

He is the son of Sverre Anker Ousdal (1944–2026).

== Films ==
- 2025: The Battle of Oslo
