= Jon Gunnar Arntzen =

Norwegian encyclopedist

Jon Gunnar Arntzen (born 1951) is a Norwegian encyclopedist. He studied at the University of Oslo where he got his cand.mag. in 1974. His main interest is the history of Oslo in general, and has edited multiple books on this topic. His latest edited book is OSLO 1900–1925, which is the fourth book in a series on the history of Oslo.
