= Ole Arntzen Lützow-Holm =

Norwegian priest and politician

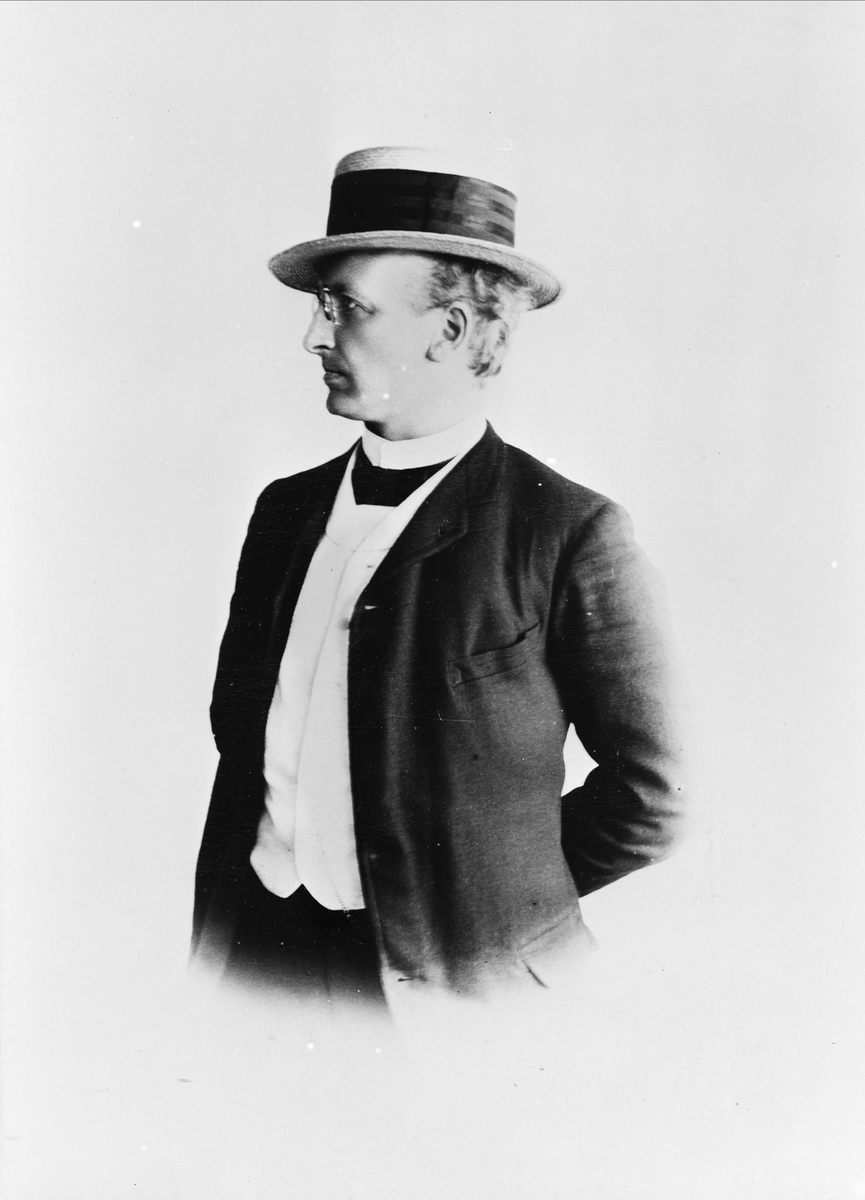

Ole Arntzen Lützow-Holm (1853–1936) was a Norwegian priest and politician for the Conservative Party.

He was a son of priest and politician Peter Holm. Together with Anne Marie Riddervold Jensen (1855–1934) he had the son Finn Lützow-Holm, an aviator. His wife was a daughter of Peter Andreas Jensen and granddaughter of Hans Riddervold. Ole's granddaughter was married to Alv Johnsen.

He was elected to the Parliament of Norway in 1889 and 1892 for the constituency Finmarkens Amt, and then in 1898 and 1900 for the constituency of Østerrisør. He had previously served as a deputy representative during the term 1886–1888.

Ole Arntzen Lützow-Holm was an opponent of protectionist policies.
