= Geir Selvik Malthe-Sørenssen =

Norwegian con artist (born 1965)

- Born: Geir Selvik; 15 May 1965
- Other name: Geir Erichsen
- Known for: Fraud
- Status: Convicted
- Criminal charges: Fraud and forgery
- Penalty: 3 years imprisonment

Geir Eriksen (born 15 May 1965), former names Geir Selvik and Geir Selvik Malthe-Sørenssen, is a Norwegian con artist and convicted felon. He formerly worked as a private investigator for criminal clients, and became known for fabricating material in the Arne Treholt case; it was subsequently revealed that he had engaged in similar fraud in a large number of other cases. He was charged with aggravated fraud and forgery; he pled guilty to all charges and in 2018 was sentenced to three years in prison and to pay 7 million kr in restitution. As of 2021 Malthe-Sørenssen was an inmate at Romerike Prison. He has changed his names several times, but is best known under the name Geir Selvik Malthe-Sørenssen, his legal name from 2010 to 2017. In 2021 his former wife Ida Marie Hansen published the book Jeg var gift med en bedrager (I was married to a fraudster) about the Malthe-Sørenssen case.

== Career ==
Geir Selvik Malthe-Sørenssen grew up in Bærum and started his journalistic career in the local newspaper Asker og Bærums Budstikke. He later worked in Bergens Arbeiderblad, Dagbladet and Se og Hør, and as an editor with Nettavisen and the TV3 television show Etterlyst ("Wanted"). He then left journalism to work as a private investigator, working on behalf of several defendants in criminal cases. He changed his name from Geir Selvik to Geir Selvik Malthe-Sørenssen in 2010, and to Geir Erichsen in 2017.

== Fraud ==
=== Treholt case ===
In 2010, he published a book titled Forfalskningen ("The Fabrication"), in which he alleged that the police had fabricated evidence when Arne Treholt was convicted of treason and espionage in 1985. The book was written on behalf of Treholt, and Malthe-Sørenssen was paid by Treholt for his work. The book led to much controversy and to a new evaluation of the Treholt case by the Criminal Cases Review Commission. In a 2011 ruling, the commission concluded that Malthe-Sørenssen's claims were based on fraud and turned down Treholt's request to reopen his criminal case for a fourth time.

In 2016, Malthe-Sørenssen was revealed by the newspaper Verdens Gang to have fabricated evidence in his attempt to have Treholt's case reopened. His alleged source was revealed to be Thor Nord, a used car salesman with past convictions for murder and fraud, with no connection to Treholt, who was paid by Malthe-Sørenssen to impersonate an agent of the Norwegian Intelligence Service.

=== Other cases ===
After his fraud in the Treholt case was exposed, it came to light that Malthe-Sørenssen had engaged in similar fraud in a large number of other cases. In collaboration with Nord, he had fabricated material in an inheritance case related to prominent lawyer Mona Høiness. He had also engaged in the blackmail of a Norwegian businessman by fabricating alleged evidence, also in collaboration with Nord.

== Criminal trial ==
In 2015, Malthe-Sørenssen was arrested and charged with corruption. In an unrelated case that same year, he was also investigated for fraud. He has also been named a suspect in a third criminal case.

Malthe-Sørenssen was charged with aggravated fraud of nearly 7 million kr and of forgery of documents. His criminal trial started in Oslo District Court in 2018, and he pled guilty to all charges. The public prosecutor requested a prison term of four years for Malthe-Sørenssen, taking into account his guilty plea and cooperation with the prosecution.

On 18 June 2018 Malthe-Sørenssen was convicted of aggravated fraud and forgery of documents, and sentenced to three years in prison and to pay his victims over 7 million kr in restitution.

== Bibliography ==
- Forfalskningen, politiets løgn i Treholt-saken, Publicom, 2010
