= 1951 Norwegian local elections =

== Result of municipal elections ==
Results of the 1951 municipal elections.

Party	Votes	%	Seats
Labour Party	657,187	42.39	6,015
Upolitiske, lokale og andre lister	106,603	6.88	1,917
Borgerlige felleslister	96,400	6.22	1,545
Liberal Party	146,008	9.42	1,396
Farmers' Party	92,600	5.97	1,277
Conservative Party	236,531	15.26	1,050
Christian Democratic Party	112,705	7.27	916
Communist Party	94,310	6.08	515
Småbrukere, arbeidere og fiskere	8,075	0.52	128
Total	1,550,419	100.00	14,759
Registered voters/turnout	2,177,213	–	
Source: Élections en 1951 pour les conseils communaux et municipaux
