= Andrea Arntzen =

Carla Andrea Arntzen (29 August 1875 – 13 April 1958) was a Norwegian nursing teacher, and co-founder of the Norwegian Nurses' Union.

She was born in Christiania as a daughter of banker Andreas Arntzen (1837–1919) and Anna Cathrine Elisabeth Stilling (1845–1918). She was a great-granddaughter of President of the Storting Andreas Arntzen (1777–1837).

Arntzen started with attending a course in nursing at Rikshospitalet in the early 1890s. Spurred by this, she travelled to Hamburg in 1894 to take a full nurse's education. She worked as a nurse in Solør from 1897, then at the epidemiology department at Ullevål Hospital from 1898. From 1900 to 1912 she was a chief nurse at the tuberculosis department at Ullevål, only interrupted by a study trip to England and Scotland in 1902.

From 1912 Arntzen worked as housemistress of the nurse's residence at Ullevål. She also managed Ullevål's nursing education and all office work regarding female staff at the hospital. From 1915 Ullevål became a national centre of nursing education, with more theoretical testing, systematic practical training and examination. In 1919 her position was upgraded to that of manager, still overseeing the nursing education and all female staff at Ullevål. She held this position until she retired in 1935.

In 1912 Arntzen was a co-founder of the Norwegian Nurses' Union. Together with union leader Bergljot Larsson, she spearheaded the work to institutionalize the nursing education in Norway as a three-year course, although this reform would not passed by Parliament for many years.

Arntzen was proclaimed an honorary member of the Norwegian Nurses' Union and was awarded the King's Medal of Merit in gold. She did not marry. She died in April 1958 in Oslo.
