= Stein Kåre Kristiansen =

Norwegian journalist

Stein Kåre Kristiansen (born 22 March 1951) is a Norwegian journalist. He is currently political editor of the television channel TV 2. As such, he appears on-screen as a news analyst on political affairs.

In 2006, Kristiansen was one of only three journalists in Norway to be taxed on an income of more than a million Norwegian kroner. The incomes of the top three were Davy Wathne with 1,672,845, Oddvar Stenstrøm with 1,187,114, and Stein Kåre Kristiansen with 1,055,417. In 2005, he took up a new position in the channel as political editor. From 2010 he led the programme Kristiansen and Strand, together with Arne Strand. He joined TV 2 in 2014. He has since been an advisor to Gambit H+K and a political commentator.
