= Ole Arntzen Lützow =

Norwegian politician

Ole Arntzen Lützow (14 November 1801 – 2 November 1871) was a Norwegian politician.

He was elected to the Parliament of Norway in 1839, 1842 and 1845, representing the rural constituency of Hedemarkens Amt. He worked as a farmer.
