= Arne Treholt =

Norwegian civil servant, diplomat and spy (1942–2023)

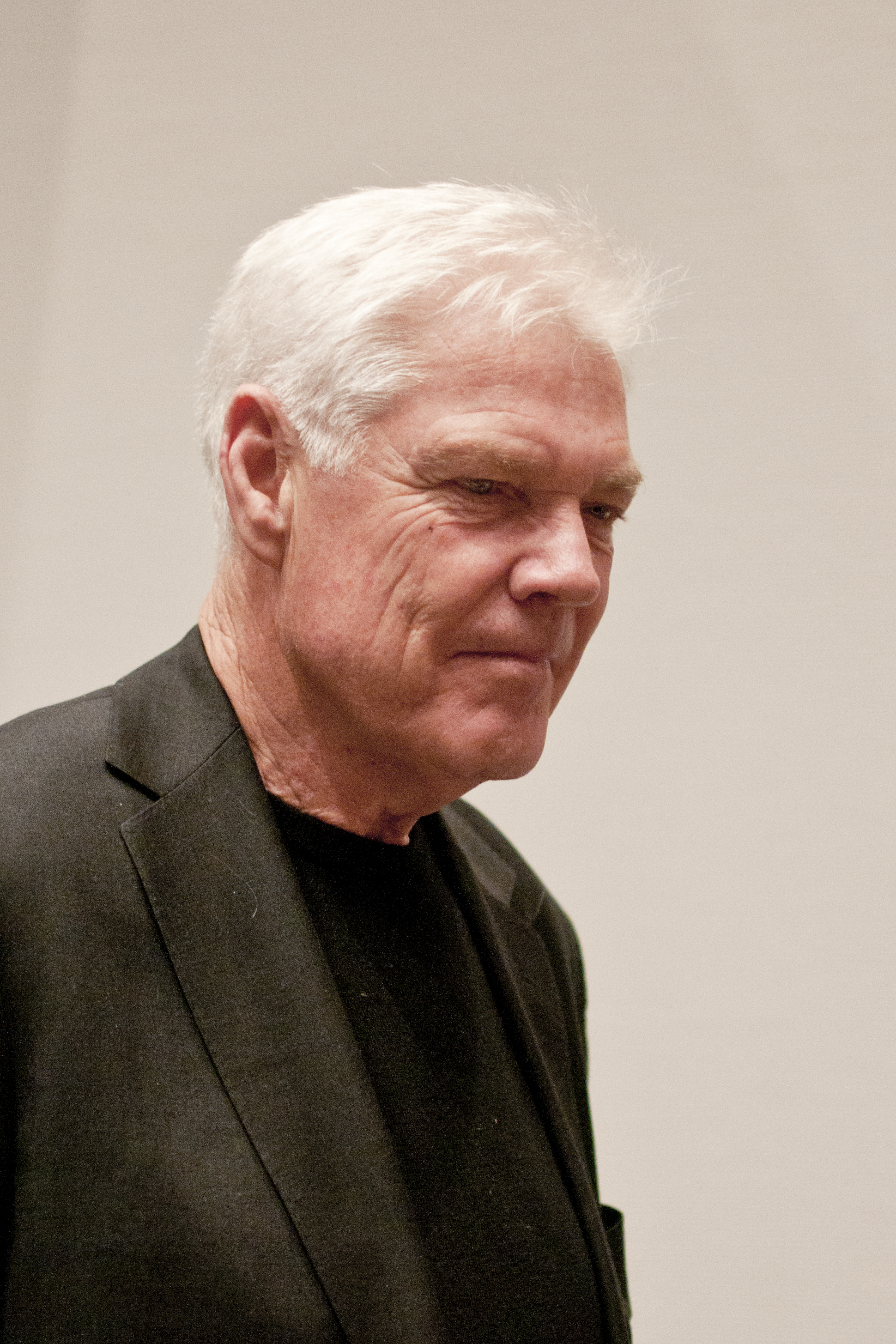
- Treholt in 2010
- Born: 13 December 1942; Brandbu, German-occupied Norway
- Died: 12 February 2023 (aged 80); Moscow, Russia
- Occupation: Businessman
- Status: Released in 1992
- Convictions: Treason and espionage on behalf of the Soviet Union and Iraq
- Penalty: 20 years imprisonment

Arne Treholt (13 December 1942 – 12 February 2023) was a Norwegian civil servant, diplomat and Labour Party politician who was convicted of spying for the Soviet Union and Iraq. Treholt served as the State Secretary under Norwegian Minister of Maritime Law, Jens Evensen, from 1976–78, as a Norwegian counsellor at the United Nations in New York from 1979–82, as a student at the Norwegian Joint Staff College from 1982–83, and head of the press department at the Ministry of Foreign Affairs in 1983. He held connections with Soviet and Iraqi agents during this period. Treholt was arrested in 1984 and sentenced to 20 years in prison for espionage the following year, but was pardoned in 1992. He was the first Norwegian to be convicted of espionage.

His father Thorstein Treholt was a senior member of the Labour Party who served as the Minister of Agriculture in the 1970s. Before entering politics Arne was a journalist for the Arbeiderbladet.

== Early and personal life ==
Arne Treholt was born to Thorstein Treholt (1911–93) and Olga Lyngstad (1913–76). His father was a senior member of the Labor Party who served as a member of Storting and as the Minister of Agriculture. Arne studied at the Oslo Cathedral School, where he earned his examen artium in 1961, and later became a student at the Faculty of Social Sciences, University of Oslo. He was involved in student politics at both of these institutions.

He married Brit Sjørbotten (1944–) in 1967, they divorced in 1973. In 1977, he married journalist Kari Storækre, the marriage also resulted in a divorce in 1985. In 1987, he married Renee Michelle "Shelly" Steele (1968–1992), a fellow inmate until her release.

== Career ==
Treholt was a member of the Norwegian Labour Party and had worked as a journalist for Arbeiderbladet since 1966.

Treholt met Jens Evensen while opposing the 1967 coup by the Greek junta. He was the political secretary for Evensen when the latter served as the minister of commerce. He then became the State Secretary (1976–1978) when Evensen served as the Norwegian Minister of Maritime Law. Treholt was central in negotiating trade agreements with the Council of Europe, the law of the sea, and Norwegian economic zones on the coast of Northern Norway with the Soviet Union. Treholt is noted to have built up a large network of contacts within politics, media and civil service. Treholt and Evensen's unconventional style and close political relationship was met with skepticism especially for the fact that Treholt was considered to be a part of the Labor Party's security policy left wing.

From 1979 to 1982 he was connected to the Norwegian UN delegation in New York as an embassy counsellor. During the years 1982–1983 he studied at the Norwegian Joint Staff College. He was also department head of division for the Norwegian Ministry of Foreign Affairs' press from 1983.

== Espionage ==
Treholt provided the Soviet Union with information on the Norwegian defense plans for northern Norway in the event of a Soviet invasion, material weaknesses in the Norwegian Armed Forces, mobilization plans, information on how to most effectively take out Norwegian soldiers, Norwegian emergency plans, the location of NATO allies' stored equipment in Norway, and the meeting minutes of the Prime Minister and Foreign Minister. Treholt was found to possess a secret bank account in Switzerland with a substantial illicit amount. Treholt's espionage is generally seen as the most serious spy case in the modern history of Norway. Following his arrest, Treholt was described as "the greatest traitor to Norway since Quisling". The Treholt case was the last major espionage case in Norway during the Cold War, following the earlier Haavik case, the Høystad case and the Sunde case.

=== Investigation and arrest ===
Treholt was placed under surveillance by Norwegian counterintelligence services for several years of his career in the Norwegian Institute of International Affairs (Norsk utenrikspolitisk institutt; NUPI) and the Norwegian Ministry of Foreign Affairs (Utenriksdepartementet; UD). On 20 January 1984, he was arrested by Ørnulf Tofte, head of counterintelligence, at Fornebu Airport in Oslo, on his way to Vienna to meet with KGB officers. The arrest, which happened on the way to a secret meeting with KGB General Gennadij Titov when Treholt was the head of the press department at the Ministry of Foreign Affairs, caused serious shock in the country.

The police conducted two searches of Treholt's apartment. In May 1982, they found US$10,000 in a suitcase. In August 1983 they found US$30,000 in the same suitcase. Treholt and his lawyer later alleged that Norwegian counterintelligence services produced this evidence themselves, and that the police and the judges conspired to cheat with the cash evidence, to make it appear as if the money came from the KGB. These allegations have been refuted as untrue. Furthermore, Treholt during the trial admitted to having received "expenses" from the KGB, but claimed that it could "only" have been US$26,000 or US$27,000.

Tapes from the trial, that were released in 2014, show that the notes in the suitcase were 50- and 100-dollar notes, and not as the verdict states: US$20 and US$50 notes.

Treholt admitted unauthorized contact with KGB officers but claimed that he maintained these contact to open channels between East and West in one of the coldest phases of the Cold War. Throughout the case, Treholt denied that he had handed over information to his contacts that could harm national security, while he acknowledged violating the rules that a public official is obliged to follow. Treholt also acknowledged that as a Norwegian UN diplomat he had written several memoranda for the Iraqi Intelligence Service and received significant sums of money for his work.

=== Trial and conviction ===
Following a much publicized trial presided over by Astri Rynning, with Andreas Arntzen and Jon Lyng as the criminal defense lawyers and Lasse Qvigstad and Tor-Aksel Busch as the public prosecutors, Treholt was convicted and sentenced to 20 years in prison by the Eidsivating Court of Appeal on 20 June 1985, one year short of the maximum sentence allowed under the Norwegian penal code. The conviction included espionage for the Soviet Union and Iraq, and high treason.

Treholt was convicted and sentenced for passing classified material to KGB in the period 1974–1983 and to the Iraqi Intelligence Service 1981–1983. The sentence also encompassed handing over secrets obtained at the Norwegian Joint Staff College where he was enrolled with authorization from the non-socialist coalition government. Despite the fact that the government of Prime Minister Kåre Willoch knew that he was under suspicion of espionage, he was admitted so as not to reveal the suspicions harboured by the authorities. This decision of the Willoch government lead to controversy.

The trial led to a heated and extensive public debate about the Treholt case in Norway. The controversy concerned the evidence, and lack thereof, against Treholt, the conduct of the police and prosecuting authorities, and what was viewed as lenient treatment of Treholt while he was under suspicion. Some accused the judges of miscarriage of justice and believed that Treholt was an idealistic bridge builder between East and West. The role of the media in the case and the length of the prison sentence were also hotly debated.

=== Incarceration and release ===
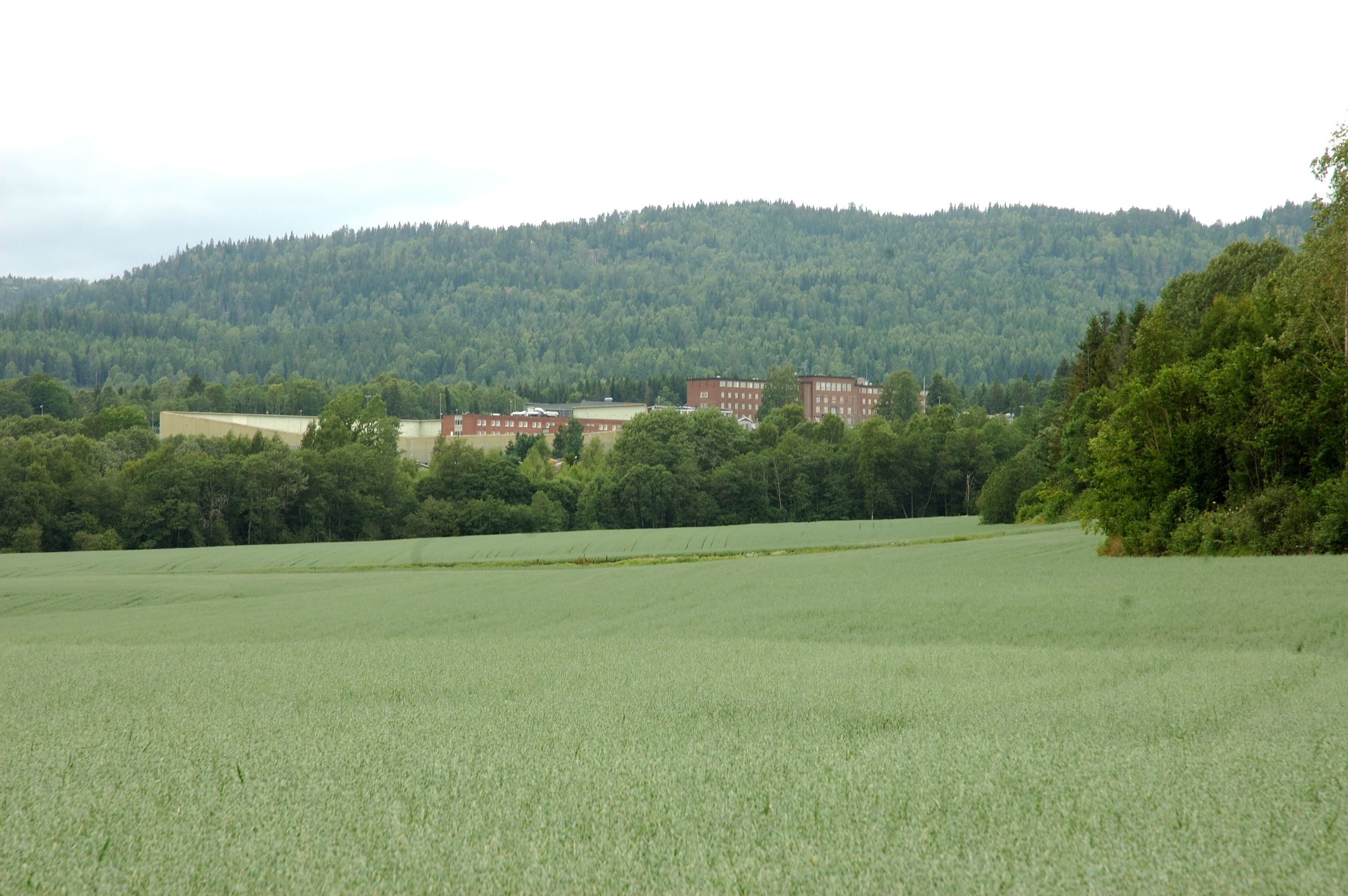
Ila Detention and Security Prison

Treholt was incarcerated in Drammen Prison from 1984 to 1985. He was transferred to Ila Detention and Security Prison, a maximum security prison, on 29 July 1985. In June 1986, prison officials discovered that he planned to break out, and he was swiftly transferred to another maximum security prison for longterm inmates, Ullersmo Prison. On 8 August 1988, he was again transferred to the Ila Prison.

He was granted early release in 1992 based on claims of ill health. On 3 July 1992, he was reprieved by the Labour government of Gro Harlem Brundtland. His pardon by Brundtland's Labour government in the summer of 1992, was controversial.

In total, he served nine years in maximum security prisons.

=== Aftermath ===
The original verdict was initially appealed to the Supreme Court of Norway (Høyesterett), but Treholt withdrew the case during the appeal hearing because he did not trust that the court would give him a fair treatment. Treholt subsequently attempted several times to have his case reopened; this was finally rejected in 2008. In 2011, Treholt requested that the case be reopened, among other things because new evidence indicated that photographic evidence in the case had been forged. On 9 June 2011, the Commission for the Reopening of Criminal Cases rejected this request.

On 15 December 2008, Norwegian Criminal Cases Review Commission (Kommisjonen for gjenopptakelse av straffesaker) ruled that the case would not be reviewed. The decision was final and could not be appealed. As a result of the decision, the prosecutor who handled the case in 2008, Stein Vale, wrote a book to summarize the case. The book – Teppefall i Treholtsaken (transl. Curtain falls on the Treholt case) – was published in September 2009. The chairwoman of the review commission, Janne Kristiansen, was appointed head of the Norwegian Police Security Service, the descendant organization of the Politets overvåkningstjeneste (lit. 'Police surveillance service'). Kristiansen and the PST would be defending the former POT from allegations of evidence tampering later on.

In September 2010, a new book by the con artist Geir Selvik Malthe-Sørenssen, who then claimed to be a private investigator, claimed that the searches of Treholt's apartment had not taken place and that one of the pieces of evidence presented in court had been fabricated by the police. He applied for a review of his case. On 18 September 2010, the Norwegian newspaper Aftenposten wrote that an anonymous former counter-intelligence employee claimed Treholt's and his lawyer's claim of evidence fabrication was true, but a few days later the anonymous alleged former employee withdrew many of his claims, stating that he did not know. The Attorney General asked the Criminal Cases Review Commission to look at the case again in light of the recent claims. The Attorney General stated that he did not believe the outcome of the case would have been any different without the evidence in question. Malthe-Sørenssen was publicly exposed as a fraudster in 2016, and his alleged source was revealed by Verdens Gang to be a used car salesman and convicted murderer and con artist with no connection to the Treholt case, who was paid by Malthe-Sørenssen to impersonate a police security service employee.

On 24 September 2010, the Norwegian Criminal Cases Review Commission decided to reopen its investigation of the case, previously closed in 2008. On 9 June 2011, the commission decided that the Arne Treholt criminal case would not be reopened. Based on interviews with 29 witnesses (18 of whom were former police investigators who had been involved in the Treholt investigation) as well as forensic studies of photographs, negatives and documents, the commission unanimously concluded that there was no basis to suggest that evidence against Treholt had been tampered with or had been fabricated. In a 59-page document, the commission completely discounted the allegations made in the 2010 book. After the verdict, PST-director Kristiansen, who had denied re-opening the case in 2008, demanded an apology from Treholt's supporters. The demand was rejected.

In 2014 Treholt's lawyer Harald Stabell claimed to have been tipped off by an employee of Police Security Service that his law office had been under audio surveillance in 2010 and 2011. After Geir Selvik Malthe-Sørenssen had been exposed as a fraudster in 2016, Stabell stated that the source of this claim was Malthe-Sørenssen and not an employee of the Police Security Service.

== Later life and death ==
Through interviews, debates and television productions, Treholt was an active presence in the Norwegian public sphere in the years after his pardon even beyond his espionage case.

After his release from prison Treholt subsequently lived and worked as a businessman in Russia and Cyprus, for periods in partnership with former contacts in the KGB. Treholt moved to Russia, where he started a company together with a former KGB general. In March 2006, media said that Treholt had been admitted to a hospital in Cyprus and was in a stable but critical condition, and in a coma, possibly suffering from blood poisoning.

Treholt was accused by the Norwegian media of promoting Russian propaganda. Following the 2022 Russian invasion of Ukraine, Treholt and Glenn Diesen wrote an article that claimed that Russia has "legitimate interests and security needs" and claimed that Russia was unfairly demonized. Aftenposten's foreign affairs editor Kjell Dragnes wrote that Treholt and Diesen promoted Russian propaganda.

Treholt died in Moscow on 12 February 2023, at the age of 80.

== Popular culture ==
The 2010 action-comedy Norwegian Ninja created a fake "secret history" of the affair: Treholt was commander of a secret team of ninjas that fought enemies of the state on orders from the King of Norway, and that their centre-left political views lead to Operation Gladio framing them for treason. Directed by Thomas Cappelen Malling, it is based on his own 2006 novel Ninjateknikk II. Usynlighet i strid 1978 (Ninja Technique II. Invisibility in Battle 1978), written from the perspective of Treholt.

== Works ==
Treholt wrote several autobiographical books on his experiences in prison:

- "Alone" (Alene, 1985)
- "Section K" (Avdeling K, 1991)
- "Shades of Grey" (Gråsoner, 2004)
