= Lloyd Arntzen =

Canadian jazz musician (born 1927)

- Born: 19 September 1927 (age 98); Rosetown, Saskatchewan, Canada
- Origin: Vancouver, British Columbia, Canada
- Genres: Dixieland Jazz
- Occupations: Musician; School Teacher
- Instruments: Clarinet; Vocals; Soprano saxophone

Lloyd Arntzen (born 19 September 1927) is a jazz clarinetist, folk singer, and soprano saxophonist from Vancouver, British Columbia, Canada. Arntzen has been an active participant on the New Orleans jazz scene, forming the New Orleans North Traditional Jazz Band along with members Alan Matheson, Grant Simpson, Craig Scott and Graeme Peters. Arntzen is also a member of the band Sweet Papa Lowdown, featuring band members Jeff Schucard, Dan Marcus and Craig Smith.

Arntzen's family is a particularly musical one. In 2006, Gwendoline Records issued a live CD titled 3 Generations in Jazz, featuring Arntzen along with his two sons and two grandsons, recorded at Vancouver's Cellar Jazz Café.

In 2013, his group Blackstick released a CD that had been crowdfunded by fans. Other musicians on the disc include his grandsons Evan and Arnt Arntzen on reeds and banjo/guitar respectively, Don Ogilvie on guitar, Jen Hodge on bass, and Benji Bohannon on drums, and it was engineered by Dave Henderson. Including an original tune by Evan Arntzen, the album was recorded in Lloyd's basement over a period of three days in September.
