= Kristoffer Aamot =

Norwegian journalist (1889–1955)

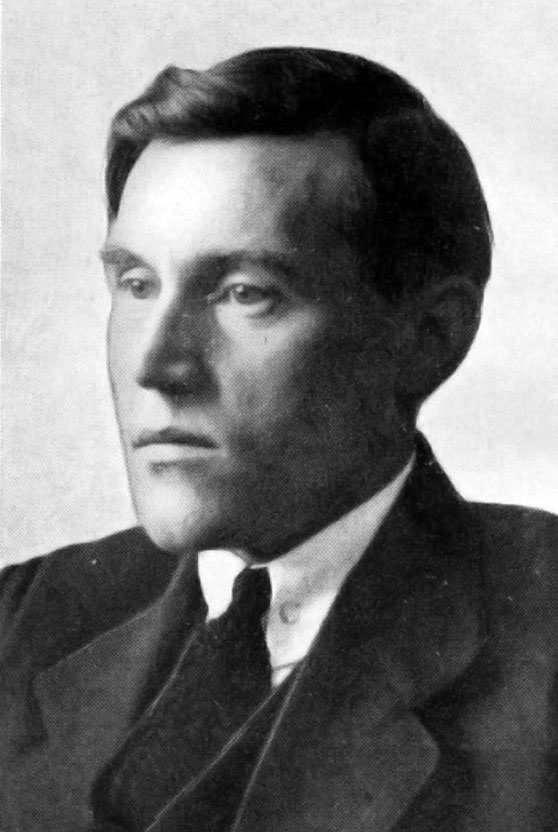
- Born: 26 March 1889; Kristiania, Norway
- Died: 22 March 1955 (aged 65)
- Occupations: journalist, magazine editor, politician and cinema administrator
- Political party: Labour Party

Kristoffer Aamot (26 March 1889 – 22 March 1955) was a Norwegian journalist, magazine editor, politician and cinema administrator.

== Personal life ==
Born in Kristiania (now Oslo) on 26 March 1889, Aamot was a son of Anton Christiansen Aamot and Berntine Christoffersen. In 1915 he married Doris Marie Larsen.

== Career ==
As a young journalist, Aamot was sentenced to one year imprisonment for his writings in the newspaper Klassekampen. He was a member of the Oslo City Council from 1917 to 1937, representing the Labour Party, and served as deputy mayor of Oslo from 1929 to 1931.

He was a director of Oslo Kinematografer from 1934 to 1955, except for the war years. A film award (in Norwegian: Aamotstatuetten) was named after him.

He was also the writer of the Norwegian comic strip Skomakker Bekk og Tvillingene Hans, which was drawn by Jan Lunde.
