= Gunvor Galtung Haavik =

Norwegian civil servant and suspected spy

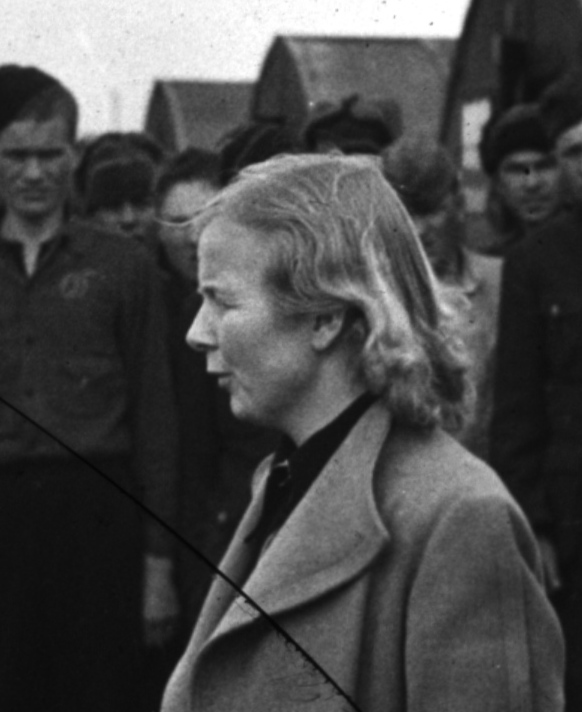
Gunvor Galtung Haavik in 1945.

Gunvor Galtung Haavik (7 October 1912 – 5 August 1977) was a Norwegian employee of the Norwegian Ministry of Foreign Affairs and a suspected spy.

Haavik was born in Oslo. She studied medicine at the University of Oslo from 1932 to 1933, but gave up her studies and became a nurse instead. She worked at hospitals in Norway and spent the war years at a hospital in Bodø, where she picked up Russian and fell in love with a Russian prisoner-of-war, Vladimir Koslov. Consequently, in 1946, the foreign ministry hired her as an interpreter.

In 1947, she was assigned to the Norwegian Embassy in Moscow and was soon recruited by the KGB. She maintained an intimate affair with Koslov for two years and committed to spying on behalf of the Soviet Union after the KGB threatened to deport him to Siberia. In 1955, she returned to Oslo but continued her espionage activities through a Soviet handler.

She was arrested by Norwegian security police at the Bråten tram stop on 27 January 1977 after she had been betrayed by Oleg Gordievsky. She was charged with espionage on behalf of the Soviet Union and treason. She allegedly confessed to the crimes and died under mysterious circumstances in prison before the case could come to trial.

On 3 October 2008, the film Iskyss premiered in Norwegian cinemas. It is an adaptation of the biography with the same title by the investigative journalist and author Alf R. Jacobsen and is directed by Knut Erik Jensen.
