= Heidi Larssen =

Norwegian politician (born 1951)

Heidi Larssen (born 8 November 1951 in Oslo) is a Norwegian politician for the Conservative Party.

She was elected to the Norwegian Parliament from Oslo in 2001, but was not re-elected in 2005. She served in the position of deputy representative during the term 2005–2009.

Larssen held various positions in Oslo city council from 1997 to 2001. Since 2004 she has been the leader of the local party chapter.

Political offices
Preceded by Gro Balas	Oslo City Commissioner of Finance; 1997–1999	Succeeded by Audun Iversen
