= Arntzen de Besche =

Norwegian business law firm

Arntzen de Besche Advokatfirma AS
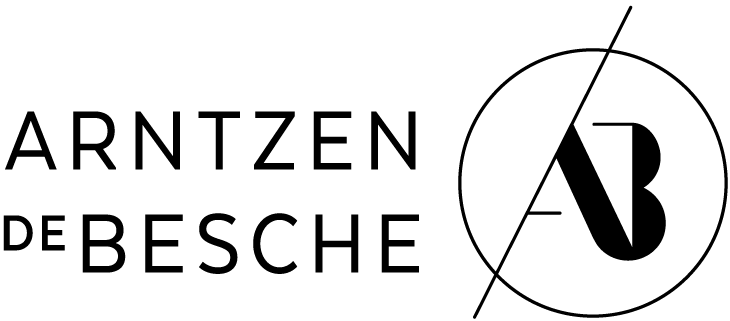
- Industry: Law
- Founded: 2001
- Headquarters: Oslo, Norway
- Key people: Håvard Sandnes (Managing partner)
- Products: Legal Services
- Revenue: 410 MNOK (2018)
- Number of employees: 170 (2019)
- Website: www.adeb.no/eng

Arntzen de Besche Advokatfirma AS is a Norwegian business law firm employing more than 130 lawyers. The firm serves Norwegian and international clients within the private and public sectors. Arntzen de Besche provides services in all areas of corporate law: EU and competition law, labor law, real estate, mergers and acquisitions and capital markets, petroleum law, tax law, company law, contract law, and litigation. The company is headquartered in Oslo, with branch offices in Trondheim and Stavanger.

The company has approximately 170 employees - who together make up one of Norway's largest law firms.

In January 2021, the Supreme Court of Norway convicted Arntzen de Besche of negligent counseling of Polaris Media and sentenced the firm to pay damages of NOK 100 million.

== History ==
Arntzen de Besche was founded in 2001 through a merger of the law firms Arntzen, Underland & Co, and de Besche & Co, while the firm's origins go back to 1870.

== Offices ==
Arntzen de Besche has three offices with more than 130 lawyers, of which 59 are partners.

=== Oslo ===
The headquarters in Oslo is centrally located in Bygdøy allé 2 and has more than 90 lawyers, of whom 38 are partners and secretarial staff and management of approximately 30 employees.

=== Trondheim ===
The Trondheim office, with about 25 lawyers, is the city's largest law firm and became part of Arntzen de Besche in 2009 after the incorporation of the former Trondheim office of Schjødt. The office is located at Beddingen 16 at Solsiden. The company's history dates back to the year 1915.

=== Stavanger ===
The Stavanger office is centrally located at Kongsgårdbakken 1 with 10 lawyers. The office is a result of the incorporation of Advokatfirma Smedsvig Heitmann DA.

== Awards ==
In recent years Arntzen de Besche has received very positive reviews in a number of rankings.
