= Ann Petrén =

Swedish actress (born 1954)

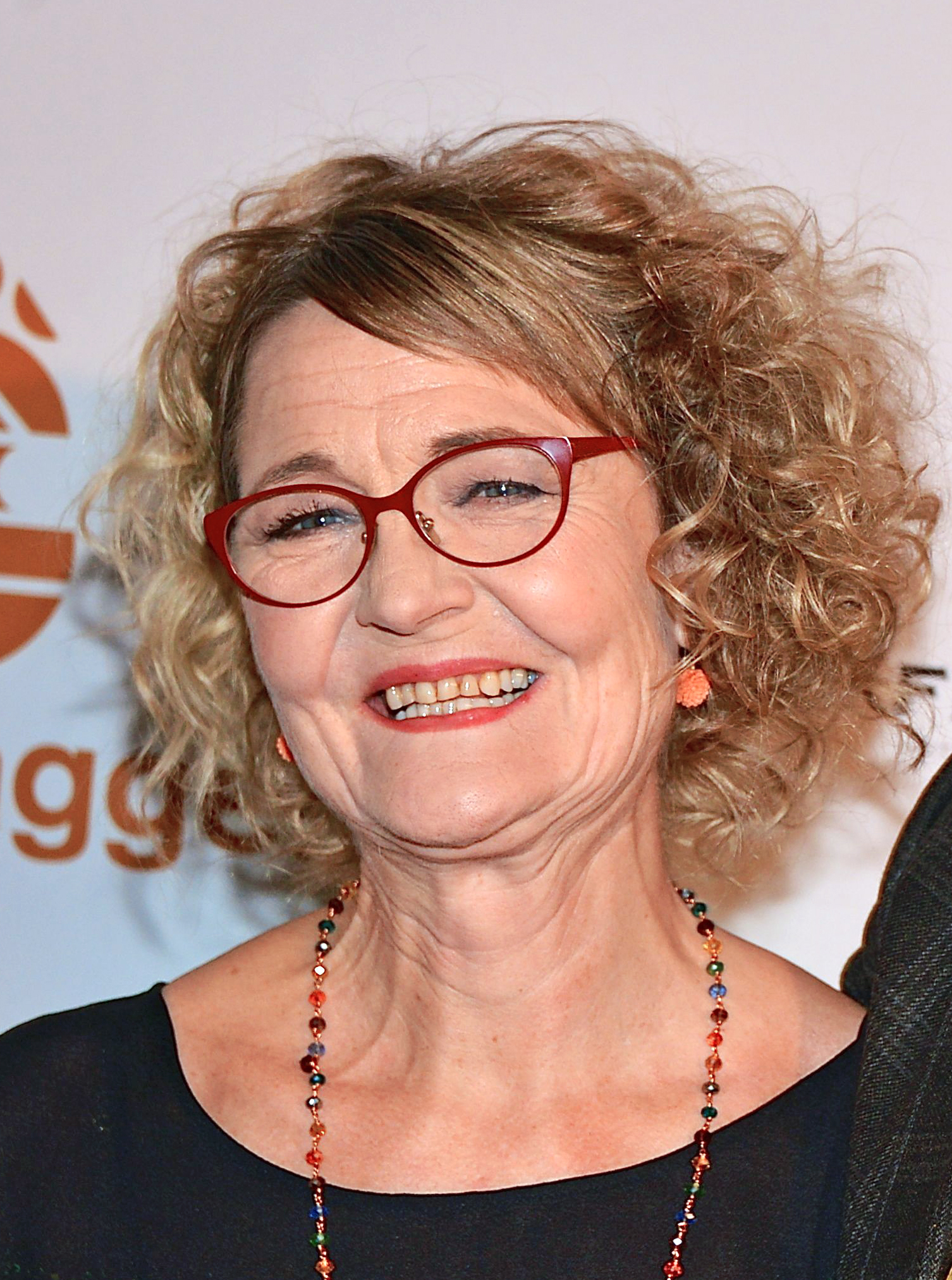
- Petrén in 2013
- Born: Ann Louise Maria Petrén; 25 May 1954 (age 72); Västerås, Sweden
- Occupation: Actress
- Years active: 1979–present
- Spouse: Bengt Berger (m. 2002)
- Awards: Guldbagge Award for Best Actress

Ann Louise Maria Petrén (born 25 May 1954) is a Swedish actress. She is known for her performances in Daybreak (2003) and Happy End (2011); for each she received a Guldbagge Award for Best Actress. She has also starred in multiple stage productions, having been a member of the permanent ensemble at Stockholm City Theatre since 1988.

== Early life and education ==
Ann Louise Maria Petrén was born 25 May 1954 in Västerås to Folke Petrén and Maud Jacobsson. Her father was an executive at Svenska Metallverken. She was educated at Malmö Theatre Academy from 1976–1979.

== Career ==
In 1988, she became a permanent member of the ensemble at Stockholm City Theatre. Her first role was in a production of Staffan Göthe's A Stuffed Dog.

She played a long-suffering wife of an alcoholic womanizer in the 1992 coming-of-age film Night of the Orangutan, also known as My Great Big Daddy.

In 2003, she played Anita in Daybreak. Stephen Holden wrote of her performance for The New York Times, "Petrén's avenging demon, in particular, is as frightening a surrogate for every wife who has been dumped for a younger woman as the screen has produced." For this role, she received a Guldbagge Award for Best Actress, the Jarl Kulle Scholarship, and the Swedish Theatre Critics Association Award.

Petrén starred in Björn Runge's 2011 film Happy End. She played Jonna, a widowed driving instructor. The film premiered at the San Sebastián International Film Festival. She received her second Guldbagge Award for Best Actress and the Dagens Nyheters Culture Prize for Happy End.

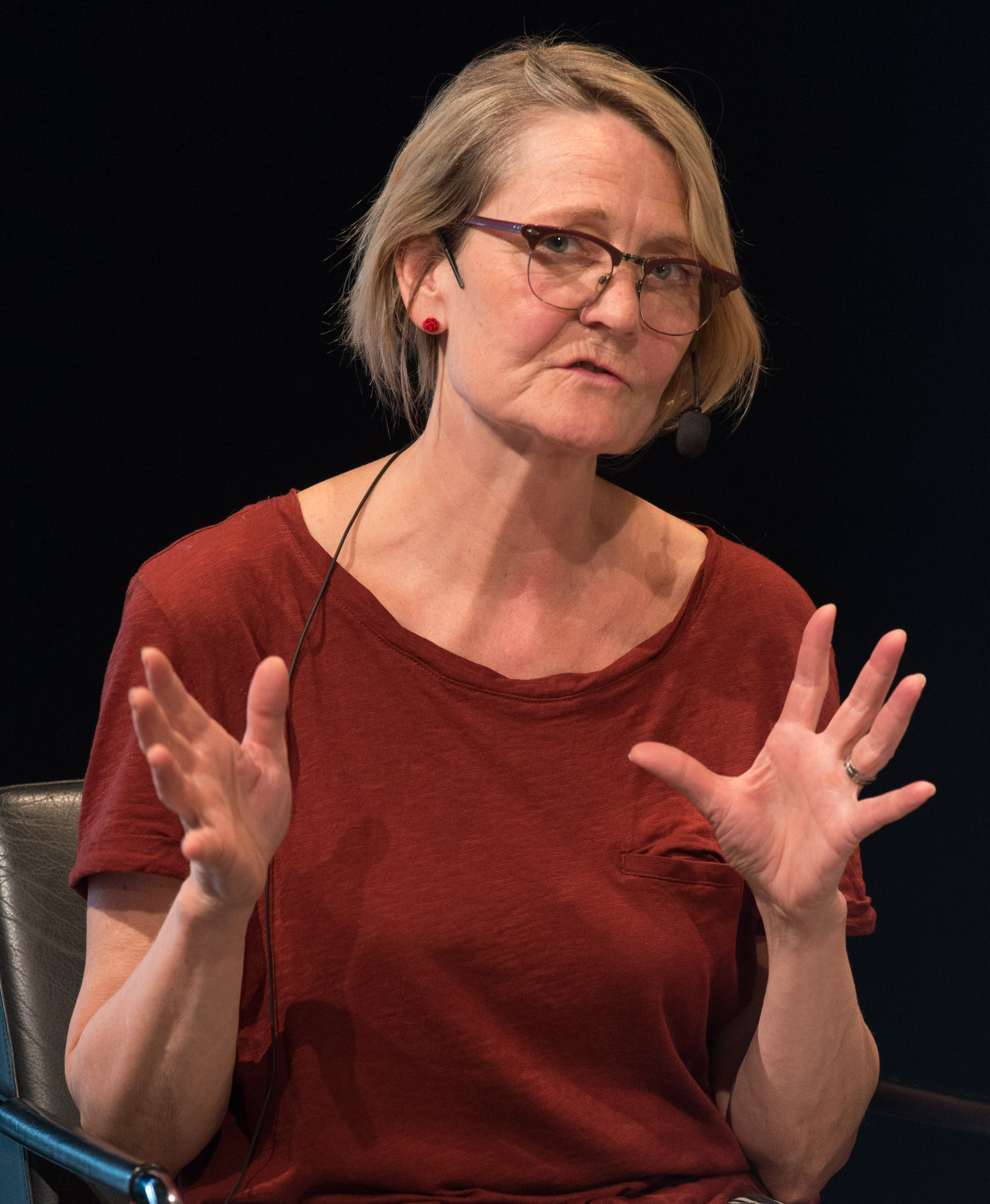
Petrén in 2015

She had a supporting role in Border, a 2018 fantasy-thriller film directed by Ali Abbasis.

She starred opposite Frida Westerdahl in Björn Runge's play Jag är en annan nu (English: I am different now). Her performance received praise in Dagens Nyheter and Västerbottens-Kuriren.

In 2022, she played a domineering drama teacher in a production of Staffan Valdemar Holm's Månen och de andra planeterna (English: The moon and other planets) at Stockholm City Theatre. Later that year she also acted in Lars Norén's Temps Morte.

== Personal life ==
In 2002, she married Bengt Berger.

== Filmography ==
=== Film ===
Year	Title	Role	Notes	Ref.
1986	The Mozart Brothers			
1986	In the Name of the Law			
1989	Peter och Petra			
1992	Night of the Orangutan			
2000	A Summer Tale			
2002	Outside Your Door			
2003	Daybreak	Anita		
2004	Dalecarlians			
2005	Mouth to Mouth			
2011	Åsa-Nisse – wälkom to Knohult			
2011	Happy End	Jonna		
2018	A Serious Game			
2018	Border	Agneta		
2020	Inland			

=== Television ===
Year	Title	Role	Notes	Ref.
2001–2002	Olivia Twist			
2020	LasseMajas detektivbyrå			
2021	Beck – Gamen			

== Awards and nominations ==
Year	Award	Work	Result	Ref.
2003	Guldbagge Award for Best Actress in a Leading Role	Daybreak	Won	
2011	Guldbagge Award for Best Actress in a Leading Role	Happy End	Won	
2011	Dagens Nyheters Culture Prize	Happy End	Won	
2015	Litteris et Artibus		Won	
