= 41st Guldbagge Awards =

Swedish awards ceremony

- Date: 30 January 2006
- Site: The Göteborg Opera, Gothenburg
- Hosted by: Lena Endre

Highlights
- Best Picture: Nina's Journey
- Most awards: Nina's Journey & Tjenare kungen (2)
- Most nominations: Mouth to Mouth (7)

Television coverage
- Network: SVT

The 41st Guldbagge Awards ceremony, presented by the Swedish Film Institute, honored the best Swedish films of 2005, and took place on 30 January 2006. Nina's Journey directed by Lena Einhorn was presented with the award for Best Film.

== Winner and nominees ==
=== Awards ===
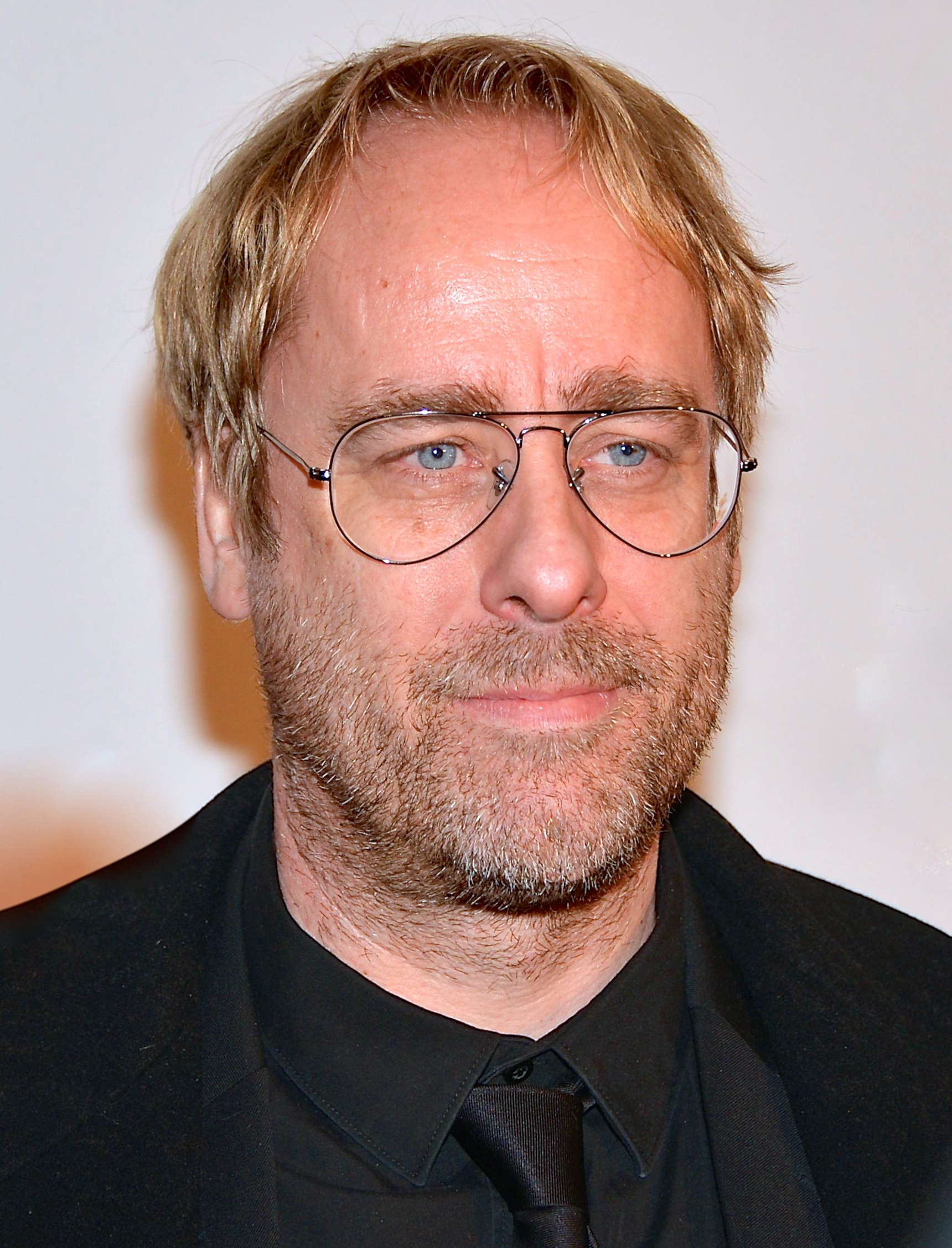
Ulf Malmros, Best Director winner

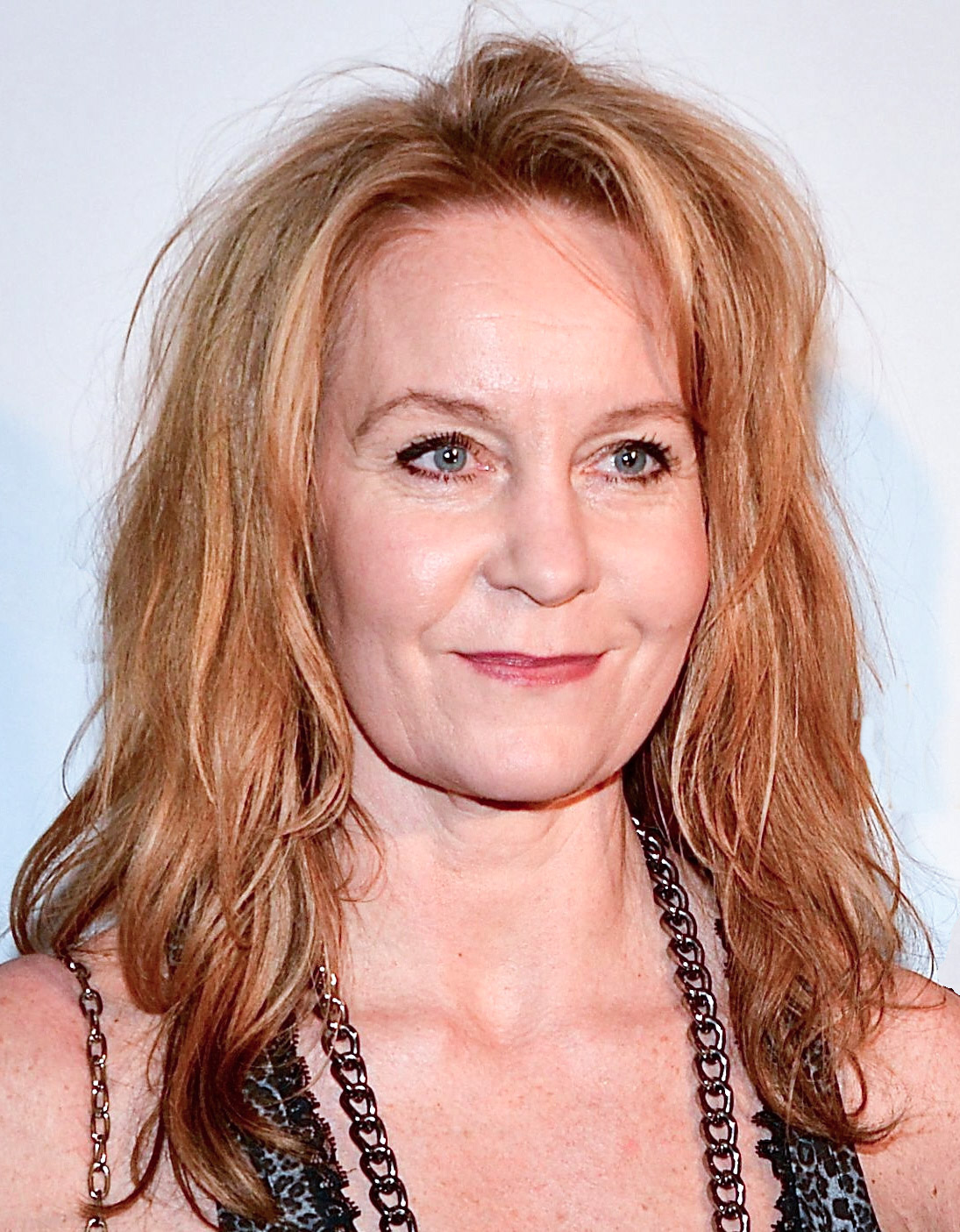
Maria Lundqvist, Best Actress winner

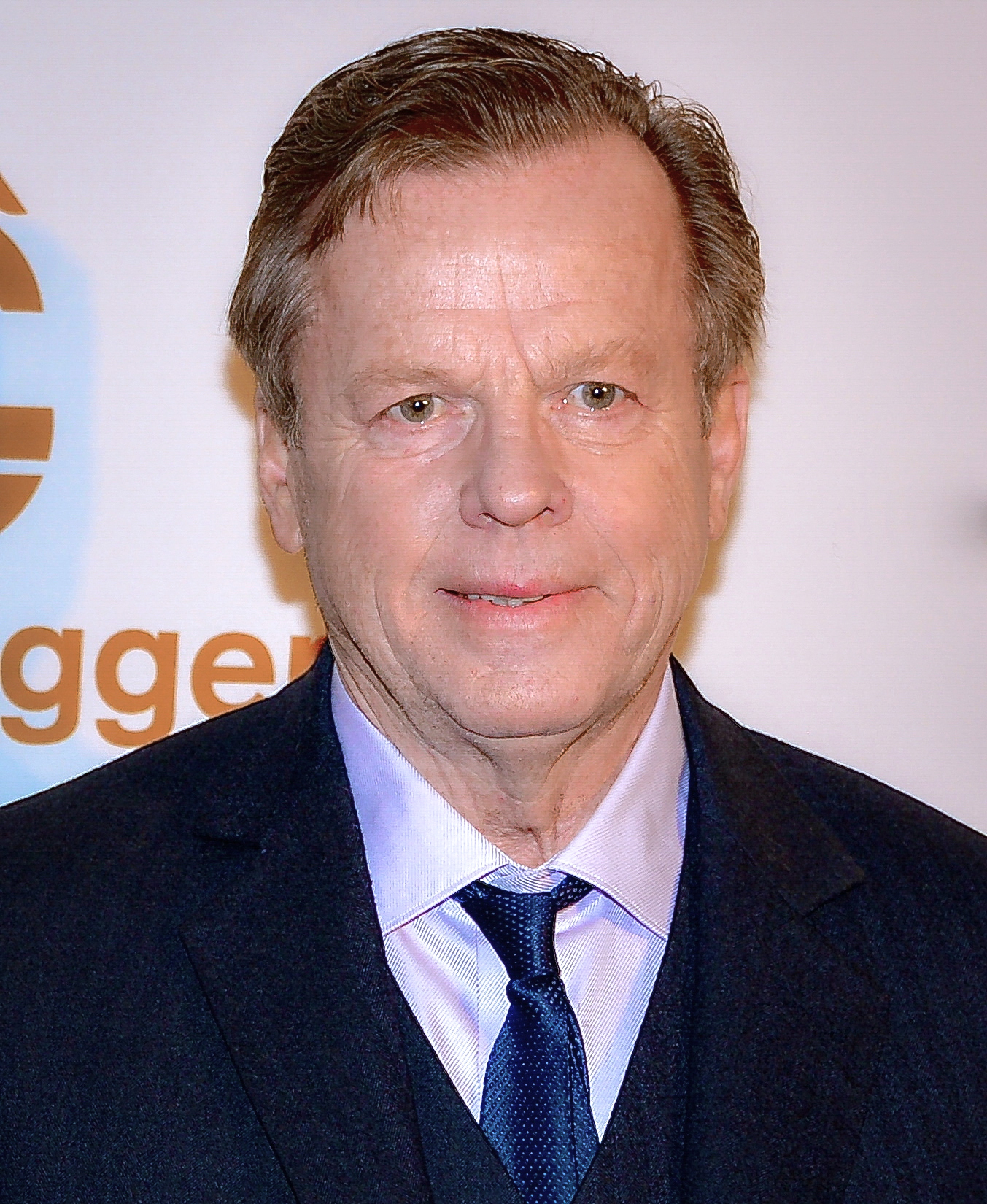
Krister Henriksson, Best Actor winner

Best Film: Nina's Journey – Kaśka Krośny; Mouth to Mouth – Clas Gunnarsson; Zozo – Anna Anthony	Best Director: Ulf Malmros – Tjenare kungen; Björn Runge – Mouth to Mouth; Josef Fares – Zozo
Best Actress in a leading role: Maria Lundqvist – Mother of Mine; Tuva Novotny – Four Weeks in June; Amanda Ooms – Harry's Daughters	Best Actor in a leading role: Krister Henriksson – Sex, Hope and Love; Mikael Persbrandt – Bang Bang Orangutang; Peter Andersson – Mouth to Mouth
Best Supporting Actress: Ghita Nørby – Four Weeks in June; Tuva Novotny – Bang Bang Orangutang; Sofia Westberg – Mouth to Mouth	Best Supporting Actor: Magnus Krepper – Mouth to Mouth; Michael Nyqvist – Mother of Mine; Börje Ahlstedt – Percy, Buffalo Bill & I
Best Screenplay: Lena Einhorn – Nina's Journey; Björn Runge – Mouth to Mouth; Josef Fares – Zozo	Best Cinematography: Aril Wretblad – Zozo; Philip Øgaard – Kim Novak Never Swam in Genesaret's Lake; Anders Bohman – Mouth to Mouth
Best Documentary Feature: Prostitution Behind the Veil – Nahid Persson; The Well – Kristian Petri; The Kinch – Måns Månsson	Best Shortfilm: A Night Story – Maja Lindström; Autobiographical Scene Number 6882 – Ruben Östlund; The Lodge – Gunilla Heilborn and Mårten Nilsson
Best Achievement: Adam Nordén, for the music in Zozo; Jaana Fomin, for the costume design in Tjenare kungen	Best Foreign Film: (Belgium) L'Enfant – Luc & Jean-Pierre Dardenne; (France) Caché – Michael Haneke; (Japan) Nobody Knows – Hirokazu Koreeda
Gullspiran: Per Åhlin, animator and director	Honorary Award: Anita Björk, actress
The Ingmar Bergman Award: Åse Kleveland

== See also ==
- 78th Academy Awards
- 63rd Golden Globe Awards
- 59th British Academy Film Awards
- 12th Screen Actors Guild Awards
- 11th Critics' Choice Awards
- 26th Golden Raspberry Awards
