= The Wife (novel) =

2003 novel by Meg Wolitzer

- Author: Meg Wolitzer
- Language: English
- Published: 2005 (Scribner)
- Publication place: United States
- ISBN: 978-0-684-86940-7

The Wife is a 2003 novel by American writer Meg Wolitzer. The book was adapted into a film released in 2017, directed by Björn L. Runge, written by Jane Anderson, and starring Glenn Close, Jonathan Pryce, and Christian Slater.

== Plot synopsis ==
On a plane, 35,000 feet in the air, Joan Castleman decides she is going to leave her husband. They are on their way to Helsinki where Joe Castleman, a world-renowned novelist, is to receive a prestigious literary award. Joan describes her husband as "one of those men who own the world ... who has no idea how to take care of himself or anyone else, and who derives much of his style from the Dylan Thomas Handbook of Personal Hygiene and Etiquette." For the forty years of their marriage, Joan has subjugated her own literary talents to support Joe's success, and now she wants to stop.

The story takes the reader back to the 1950s, to Smith College and Greenwich Village, to the meeting of Joan and Joe, the development of their relationship, and all the decisions and life turns that brought them to this point, following Joe's success and compulsive cheating—culminating in the outing of a shocking secret at the root of it all.

== Background ==
Wolitzer has expressed that when she was young, she assumed that sexism would slowly peter out, and become a relic of the past by the time she was grown. As a writer, Wolitzer is especially aware of sexism in the publishing world and became interested in exploring this inequality in a book. She says, "the idea of male experience being representative of general experience, and female experience being women’s experience only is depressing.” She has previously expressed her frustration with the limiting designation of “women’s fiction”—describing it as “that close-quartered lower shelf where books emphasizing relationships and the interior lives of women are often relegated.” Wolitzer decided to explore how differently the world treats men and women in the context of a marriage. She notes that she herself hasn't experienced this dynamic, but that her mother, Hilma Wolitzer, also a novelist, was termed a "housewife turns into novelist" when she published her first novel, a description that Wolitzer finds both condescending and interesting, as her mother described it: "it's as if she was Clark Kent going into a phone booth and sort of turning into a superhero".

== Reception ==
In her New York Times review, Clare Dederer calls The Wife "a light-stepping, streamlined novel" that in spite of rage being its signature emotion, "is also very funny". She concludes, "if The Wife is a puzzle and an entertainment, it's also a near heartbreaking document of feminist realpolitik." Publishers Weekly also provided a positive review: " Wolitzer's crisp pacing and dry wit carry us headlong into a devastating message about the price of love and fame. If it's a story we've heard before, the tale is as resonant as ever in Wolitzer's hands."

Booklist's Donna Seaman raves that The Wife is "a diabolically smart and funny assault against the literary establishment and the tacit assumption that only men can write the Great American Novel." She describes as "shrewd" how Wolitzer "choreographs [Joan's] ire into kung-fu precision moves to zap our every notion about gender and status, creativity and fame, individuality and marriage, deftly exposing the injustice, sorrow, and sheer absurdity of it all. In Bookreporter, Heather Grimshaw opines that Wolitzer crafted a "surprise ending that will startle the most intuitive of readers," and that "The Wife is a surprisingly perceptive story."

According to The Washington Post, "To say that The Wife is Wolitzer's most ambitious novel to date is an understatement. This important book introduces another side of a writer we thought we knew: Never before has she written so feverishly, so courageously... Hers is a wholly original voice, as she tells the story not only of a marriage built on uneven compromises, but also of a woman's poignant self-discovery." The Los Angeles Times calls the novel "a rollicking, perfectly pitched triumph".

== Adaptation ==
The film The Wife came out in 2017. It is directed by Björn L. Runge and written by Jane Anderson, and stars Glenn Close, Jonathan Pryce, and Christian Slater. The film garnered lead Glenn Close multiple awards for Best Actress, including a Golden Globe, Satellite Award, and an Independent Spirit Award.
