= Stillerska Filmgymnasiet =

Film school in Sweden

Coordinates: 59°20′44″N 18°09′16″E

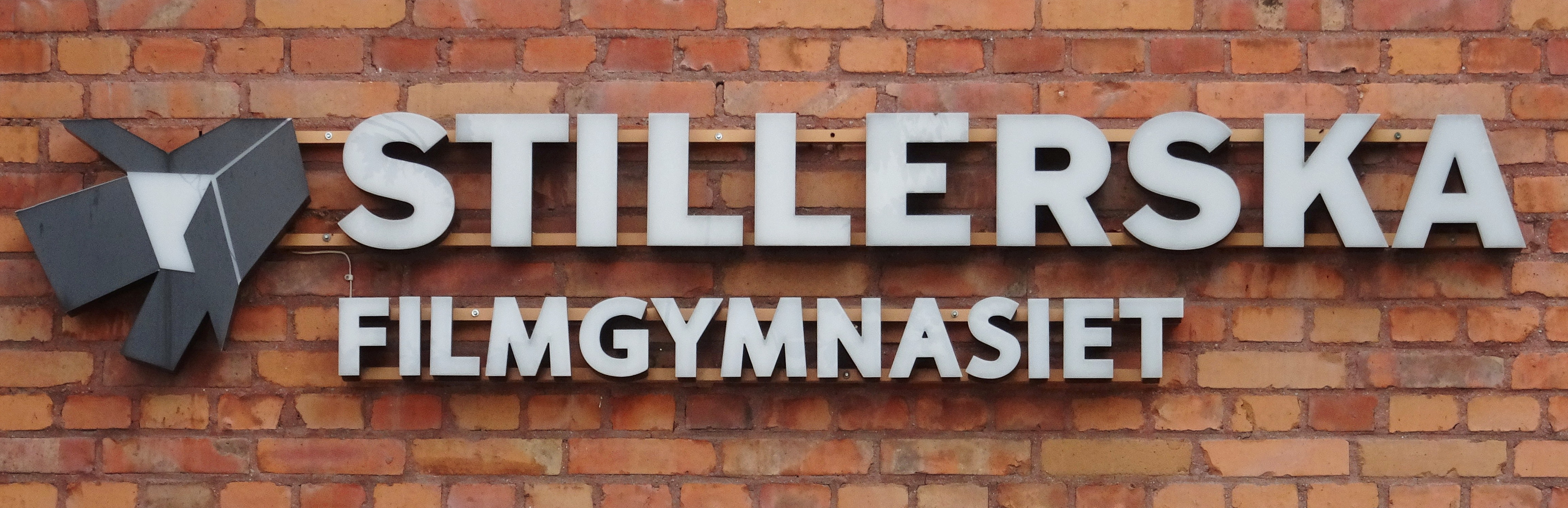
Stillerska Filmgymnasiet

Stillerska Filmgymnasiet is an upper secondary school located on Lidingö, Sweden. It was founded 2009 and the first students started the school the same autumn. Stillerska is a film school where you learn directing, cinematography, sound and much more in the film industry. The school's ambition is to include film in every core subject which gives the school a creative spirit. The semester of fall 2015 started on August 26, when all other upper secondary school students that year started on the 17th.

== Awards ==
Students from Stillerska Filmgymnasiet have been awarded in Amnesty's film festival “Angeläget” two years in a row. 2010 with the documentary “Ett Jävla Jobb” made by Filip Stankovic, Simon Linde, Michelle Hammarstrand, Felicia Budrée and Axel Hejdenberg. 2011 with the documentary “Hamid” made by Algot Sergio Ramos Åberg, Måns Rydberg, Jens Rosengren, Frej Liljenroth and Alessio El Ghoul.

The film Jag ser, jag hör, jag vet won for Best Film and Audience Award during the 2016 Amnesty Festival.

== Stillvision ==
Every spring Stillerska open its doors to the public, the students show their productions and artwork at the Stillvision screening.

== Selected filmography ==
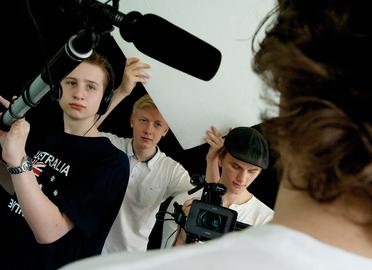
A filmteam at Stillerska Filmgymnasiet

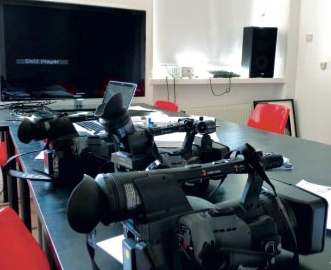
Some Stillerska cameras

=== Short films ===
- Life (2012)
- Samlaren (2012) - starring Sven Wollter
- Falsk Garanti (2012) - starring Jakob Stadell
- Grannar (2013)
- Minnen (2013)
- Väggen (2013)
- Långa Snubben Dog (2013) - featuring Keijo Salmela
- Ben & Jerry (2014)
- Håltimmen (2014)
- Arden (2014)
- Jorden (2015)
- Charlie (2015)
- Falsk Garanti (2015)
- Den Svenska Drömmen (2015)
- Stjärnfallet (2016)
- Drivved (2016) - with Kim Sulocki
- De Röda Träden (2016) - starring Magnus Krepper & Roberto Gonzalez
- Välkomna till Soltorp (2017)
- Direct Deposit (2017)
- Memoria (2018)
- Käre Far (2018)
- Stackars Djur (2018) - with Kajsa Ernst, Ann Petrén & Ulf Brunnberg

=== Documentaries ===
- Ett jävla jobb (2010)
- Hamid (2011)
- Bara jag (2014)
- SOS Kiosken (2015)
- Skylta med problemen (2015)
- Jag ser, jag hör, jag vet (2016)
- Min Bruno (2016)
- Jag ser, jag hör, jag vet (2016)
- Ensam, inte stark (2017) with Martin Schibbye
