= The Third Eye (Norwegian TV series) =

- Also known as: Det Tredje Øyet (Norwegian)
- Genre: Crime, drama
- Developed by: Ole Marius Araldsen
- Starring: Kyrre Haugen Sydness; Ida Elise Broch; Marte Engebrigtsen; Eivind Sander; Endre Hellestveit
- Composers: Alexander Andresen; Thom Hell
- Country of origin: Norway
- Original language: Norwegian
- No. of seasons: 2
- No. of episodes: 20

Production
- Executive producers: Anne Kolbjørnsen; Lasse Hallberg; Pål Kruke Kristiansen
- Producers: Ole Marius Araldsen; Bent Rognlien
- Production locations: Oslo, Norway
- Editors: Morten Rørvik; Simen Gengenbach
- Running time: 50 minutes
- Production company: Rubicon TV AS

Original release
- Network: TV 2
- Release: 24 February 2014 – 8 May 2016

The Third Eye (Norwegian: Det Tredje Øyet) is a Norwegian crime drama television series, which stars Kyrre Haugen Sydness, Ida Elise Broch and Marte Engebrigtsen. The first season was broadcast in 2014 and the second season in 2016.

== Plot ==
=== Season 1 ===
For about 4 years ago, Norwegian police officer Viggo Lust experienced one of parents worst nightmares; his daughter, Christina has simply vanished. But Viggo can't let go of the old case, and tries on the same time to find out the truth of what really happened to his daughter.

=== Season 2 ===
2 years after the setting of the first season, police investigator Viggo Lust is back on duty, after the loss of his daughter, Christina. Now, he is doing his best to investigate crimes with his colleagues in the part of the Oslo police.

== Series overview ==
Series	Episodes	Originally released	
Series	Episodes	First released	Last released
1	10	24 February 2014	28 April 2014
2	10	6 March 2016	8 May 2016

== Episodes ==
=== Season 1 (2014) ===
No. overall	No. in season	Title	Directed by	Written by	Original release date
1	1	"Episode 1"	Trygve Allister Diesen	Anne Kolbjørnsen	24 February 2014
For about 4 years ago, policeman Viggo Lust experienced a parent's worst nightmare - his daughter Christina mysteriously vanished without a trace. He just cannot leave the case alone, so tries desperately to try to find out what happened to her.
2	2	"Episode 2"	Trygve Allister Diesen	Anne Kolbjørnsen	3 March 2014
As Viggo conteniues to think of his daughter Christina, the body of a man is found in a forest. Viggo thinks that the man's Raven tattoo is an important clue. One thing he knows for sure, is that the case doesn't have anything to do with his daughter's disappearance for 4 years ago.
3	3	"Episode 3"	Trygve Allister Diesen	Pål Bugge Haagenrud	10 March 2014
A women wants to report the murder of her own mother, who died at a nursing home. Viggo and his team has difficulties to take the women seriously, when they finally realize that her report to them, has effect on her own self.
4	4	"Episode 4"	Trygve Allister Diesen	Ole Marius Araldsen	17 March 2014
Mari decides to work together with Viggo to find out the truth about what really happened to his daughter Christina. Their investigation leads them thru a dangerous environment where Viggo at some point ends up in really grave danger.
5	5	"Episode 5"	Gunnar Vikene	Håvar Karlsen	24 March 2014
Mari discovers a minor flaw in Viggo's investigation into the kidnapping of his daughter. A primary suspect in Oslo has caught the attention, and Viggo feels that he has one more piece to the puzzle of solving the mystery of the disappearance of his daughter.
6	6	"Episode 6"	Gunnar Vikene	Håvar Karlsen	31 March 2014
Mari is beaten in a robbery at a local goldsmith, and when a staff member is found dead, it leaves the police no doubt about it being a coincident. But the evidence is locked away and the police find themselves working alongside one of the robbers in able to find out the truth behind the crime.
7	7	"Episode 7"	Gunnar Vikene	Ole Marius Araldsen	7 April 2014
Viggo goes deep in interest for his wife Sofie's phonecall that she had to make the day Christina disappeared, and Mari later finds out who she actually had called that day. On the same time, a young girl vanishes from a shopping mall in Oslo, and the memories about Christina continue to haunt the mind of Viggo, but is also sends a chilling thought thru the police department and thoughts about Christina's case.
8	8	"Episode 8"	Gunnar Vikene	Ole Marius Araldsen	14 April 2014
Håvard de Lange is taken into custody and held responsible for Christina's disappearance. Viggo Lust, who has left his duty in the Police Department, is denied access for the ongoing investigation. But without the investigation as a bother, he decides to find Christina on his own. Håvard de Lange refuses involvement in the disappearance of Viggo's daughter at the police station. Been tired of his own manhunt, Viggo decides to interrogate de Lange himself. Eventually, a letter comes up at the police station, which states a demanding for money. Viggo has flash bags of his daughter as he is driving. He later has the feeling of that they are closer of finding the truth about his daughter's disappearance.
9	9	"Episode 9"	Gunnar Vikene	Ole Marius Araldsen	21 April 2014
Viggo nearly kills himself after a long time hunting for his vanished daughter Christina. At some point down the line, he fears Håvard de Lange is in danger. When it turns out that Viggo's suspicions is true, the question that haunts the police is: How could he have known all of this?
10	10	"Episode 10"	Gunnar Vikene	Ole Marius Araldsen	28 April 2014
Viggo Lust is on the run from the laws hands. Theories that he could have actually killed his own daughter, is fast spreading. But in the meantime, Viggo learns the truth about what actually happened to his daughter. The truth might finally be within reach, but Viggo finds himself in deep danger and struggles with a bad working reputation, but on the same time he also gets some unexpected help along the path he takes.

=== Season 2 (2016) ===
No. overall	No. in season	Title	Directed by	Written by	Original release date
11	1	"Episode 1"	Ole Marius Araldsen	Håvar Karlsen	6 March 2016
It has been two years since last time Viggo Lust has been in our spotlights. Following the loss of his daughter Christina, Viggo has nearly deleted every connection with the events of his past and starts focusing on his work again as a policeman within the Oslo Police, and work along his former colleagues in and out for solving crimes in the city, being also that as of organized crime.
12	2	"Episode 2"	Anne Kolbjørnsen	Håvar Karlsen	6 March 2016
Alongside his new working partner, Ståle Bragermoen; Viggo Lust tries to find the men in connection with a heroinmaker that owns a local restaurant that is under construction in the capital city of Oslo. They become witnesses to an execution, where a marbleworker named Kenneth Danielsen is killed, and the killer in black flies the scene. It takes the police a lot of work to look on CCTV cameras, but no can identify the killer yet. All the sudden, Viggo is the main witness for his previous colleague, Mari Friis.
13	3	"Episode 3"	Pål Kruke Kristiansen	Håvar Karlsen	20 March 2016
The relationship between Viggo and his colleague Mari Friis is getting better and better as the time goes by. Viggo volenteers to help her to find the killer of Kenneth Danielsen. In return, Mari tries to settle herself in with the situation that Viggo is in and she accepts that he forced himself away from her for a while. Together, they are closing in on a possible suspect.
14	4	"Episode 4"	Ole Marius Araldsen	Håvar Karlsen	27 March 2016
Images of Viggo's brain is being revealed to himself, and it appears that he might have some kind of difficulty of a hard going grade. On the same time, a suspected killer vanishes from the investigators radar and Viggo has matters growing worse as he starts to see visions of Mari being shot.
15	5	"Episode 5"	Anne Kolbjørnsen	Ole Marius Araldsen	3 April 2016
Viggo is in a better mood then before, and gets going along with his former ex-wife Sofie again. Alongside their daughter Tuva. But Viggo is not far away from his mind when visions of his previous daughter Christina, keeps appearing, and it looks like she always tries to tell him of future dangers.
16	6	"Episode 6"	Ole Marius Araldsen	Anne Kolbjørnsen	10 April 2016
Visions of Kenneth Danielsen's killer keeps haunting and scaring Viggo, and he fears that he and the rest of the police has suspected the wrong suspect responsible. Later, Viggo gets a serious warning from his doctor, and he again pushes his close contacts a little bit more out of his own sight. It later becomes more suspiciously over how Viggo could have found the body of Tony Lehman, who as dumped in his own car in a river besides a highway. Viggo explains to Mari that there could only have been one possibility of getting rid of any evidence, and that is why; who then killed Lehman, would have done it in that sort of order.
17	7	"Episode 7"	Anne Kolbjørnsen	Lasse Hallberg	17 April 2016
Soon it is ruled out that the suspected suspect Tony Lehman, is not responsible for the murder of Kenneth Danielsen, due to the lack of evidence that cannot pinpoint Lehman as the killer. It is later revealed that Lehman worked for the same marblecompany that Kenneth worked, with and Kenneth had later quit the company. Suspicions are not far away from the boss of the company, named Bård Tvedt. Viggo and the others in the police, still knows that there is another person who carries the title of Mr. X that still is out there and might be ready for his next victim.
18	8	"Episode 8"	Bent Rognlien	Ole Marius Araldsen	24 April 2016
Mathias, the head of the police district department in Oslo, decides that they need a way of having someone to talk to Carlo Carmino. Later, they are bringing in Adrian Aase to talk to Carlo Carmino in his restaurant basement, Viggo, Ståle and their boss Mathias, takes the decision of sending the 19-year-old in no matter what. They reassure him that their plan will work. But they suffer some technical issues and are not able to hear what Adrian and Carlo are talking about. Adrian is at gun point, before the mysterious killer takes the attention from Carlo. Adrian hides behind some planks, and watches the situation develop. Viggo takes no risks, despite his boss and Ståle's warnings, he heads into the restaurant and down into the basement, only to find the body of Carlo. Later, Bård Tvedt is arrested by the police, suspected for being involved in the case.
19	9	"Episode 9"	Ole Marius Araldsen	Anne Kolbjørnsen	1 May 2016
Bård Tvedt is interrogated by Mari Friis and questioned of his involvement in the heroin smuggling case. He also says that he is not the one that the police wants to set responsible for the previous killings. The police are very confident that they have got the right man responsible for the killings, but it is something that Viggo is not so confident over by himself either, and it leaves him sceptical about their findings and thoughts that Tvedt is responsible. It does however look like that there was never two bodies in Carlo's basement, only his own, and that Viggo had another vision of the mysterious killer that has been behind the crimes earlier in the series. Viggo has successfully placed Adrian Aase under arrest, and later interrogates him. The killer is later revealed to be a prison police officer Kim Jansen, who had lost a former friend in a gunfight. After thinking that Jansen might target his family next, Viggo gets his wife Sofie and daughter Tuva to Ståle's cabin, where he attempts to call him from Vårin's phone, only to get an answer that says he never should answer her phone. Towards the end of the episode, Viggo gets his gun out ready to shoot who then it is that is entering the cabin main door, leaving the episode in a cliff hanger just as he has fired a bullet.
20	10	"Episode 10"	Anne Kolbjørnsen	Bent Rognlien	8 May 2016
Following the previous episode, Viggo doesn't shot, only realising that Mari comes in the door. Viggo is more sure that the killer is Kim Jansen, and following the finding of Adrian's apartment devastated and a local hairdresser also devastated, Viggo turns his focus away and wants to get closer to Jansen. It leads to that Viggo arrives to an abandoned prison, where he finds Jansen, who mentions that Sondre Eker was his half brother. When Mari arrives, Jansen shots her with Viggo's gun. The police later arrive, and arrests Viggo and Mari is rushed to hospital, where they do their best to get out the bullet that hit her. Jansen later goes for Adrian, and interrogates him for where his heroine is located, but the 19-year-old refuses to tell him. Sofie later tells Ståle that he shall keep guard of Tuva, while she goes to look for Viggo. She eventually ends up finding him, and Viggo tells her after shooting Jansen with the help of Adrian Aase. At the hospital, he sits by Mari's side and they talk about everything being okay again as a close. After a garden feast, and when Tuva walks away in the garden, and Viggo goes to get her; he sees his daughter Christina's vision again, before he visually faintes and the others, including his wife, go to his side. The camera eventually zooms out in a bird perspective, seeing everyone around Viggo's unconscious body.

== Cast ==
- Kyrre Haugen Sydness as Viggo Lust
- Ida Elise Broch as Mari Friis
- Marte Engebrigtsen as Sofie
- Eivind Sander as Ståle Bragermoen
- Endre Hellestveit as Kårstein Omvik
