= Mouth to Mouth (2005 Swedish film) =

- Cover
- Directed by: Björn Runge
- Written by: Björn Runge
- Produced by: Gunnar Carlsson (executive producer); Tomas Eskilsson (executive producer); Clas Gunnarsson (producer); Håkan Hammarén (line producer); Lise Lense-Møller (co-producer); Peter Possne (executive producer)
- Starring: See below
- Cinematography: Anders Bohman
- Edited by: Lena Dahlberg
- Music by: Ebba Forsberg; Tobias Hylander
- Release date: 25 December 2005
- Running time: 94 minutes 92 minutes (Sweden)
- Country: Sweden
- Language: Swedish

Mouth to Mouth (Swedish: Mun mot mun) is a 2005 Swedish film directed by Björn Runge.

== Cast ==
- Peter Andersson as Mats
- Marie Richardson as Ewa
- Sofia Westberg as Vera
- Magnus Krepper as Morgan
- Anton Jarlros Gry as Joel
- Magdalena Jansson as Helen
- Liv Omsén as Susanne
- Marie Göranzon as Ewa's mother Monica
- Ingvar Hirdwall as Mats' father John
- Ann Petrén as Lisbeth
- Pernilla August as Leyla
- Camilla Larsson as Helen's mother
- Fyr Thorvald Strömberg as Helen's father
- Anna Pettersson as Veronica
- Malin Arvidsson as Ewa's colleague Petra
- Malin Lindström as Ewa's colleague Angelica
- Jan Coster as Caretaker
- Ola Hedén as The john at the parking lot
- Laszlo Hago as Vera's costumer at Morgan's flat #1
- Leif Andrée as Joel's teacher Jörgen
- Ida Renner as Deb
- Francisco Sobrado as Leo
- Erika Elfwencrona as Suss
- Finn Palm as Henke
- Shahryar Ghanbari as Amir
- Ellen Sjöö as Anki
- Patrik Helin as Café guest
- Robert Somfai as The corpse
- Josefin Simonsson as Morgan's tenant

== Soundtrack ==
- Gabriel Kofod-Hansen – "Softar" (Written by Gabriel Kofod-Hansen)
- Duke Johnsson and the Ted Brothers – "I'm a Cowboy" (Written by Otto Degerman)
- Ada Berger – "Kom till mig" (Written by Tobias Hylander and Ada Berger)
- Ulf Dageby – "Mun mot mun, Soffan" (Written by Ulf Dageby)

== Awards and nominations ==
Magnus Krepper was awarded a Guldbagge Award for Best Supporting Actor, at the 41st Guldbagge Awards. Other Guldbagge nominations was Peter Andersson for Best Actor, Anders Bohman for Best Cinematography, Björn Runge for Best Director and Best Screenplay, Clas Gunnarsson for Best Film, and Sofia Westberg for Best Supporting Actress. The film was also nominated for a Crystal Globe at the Karlovy Vary International Film Festival.
