= Home for Christmas (TV series) =

Norwegian television series

- Genre: Romantic comedy; Comedy drama
- Directed by: Per-Olav Sørensen
- Country of origin: Norway
- Original language: Norwegian
- No. of seasons: 3
- No. of episodes: 20

Production
- Producer: Anders Tangen

Original release
- Release: 5 December 2019 – present

Home for Christmas (Norwegian: Hjem til jul) is a Norwegian television series that premiered on Netflix in December 2019. It stars Ida Elise Broch as Johanne, who scrambles to get a boyfriend to bring home for Christmas Eve.

The romantic drama comedy consists of six or eight 30-minute episodes in each season and was Netflix's first Norwegian original series. The series received mostly positive reviews.

In 2022, the series was remade in Italy under the title "I Hate Christmas" (Italian: Odio il natale), running for a second series in 2023. It was also remade in South Africa in 2023, under the title "Yoh! Christmas".

== Synopsis ==
Johanne (Broch) is a nurse in her 30s, working at a hospital in Norway. During Advent dinner, she feels pressured by her family to be in a relationship. She lies and tells them that she has a boyfriend, and that he will accompany her to Christmas dinner.

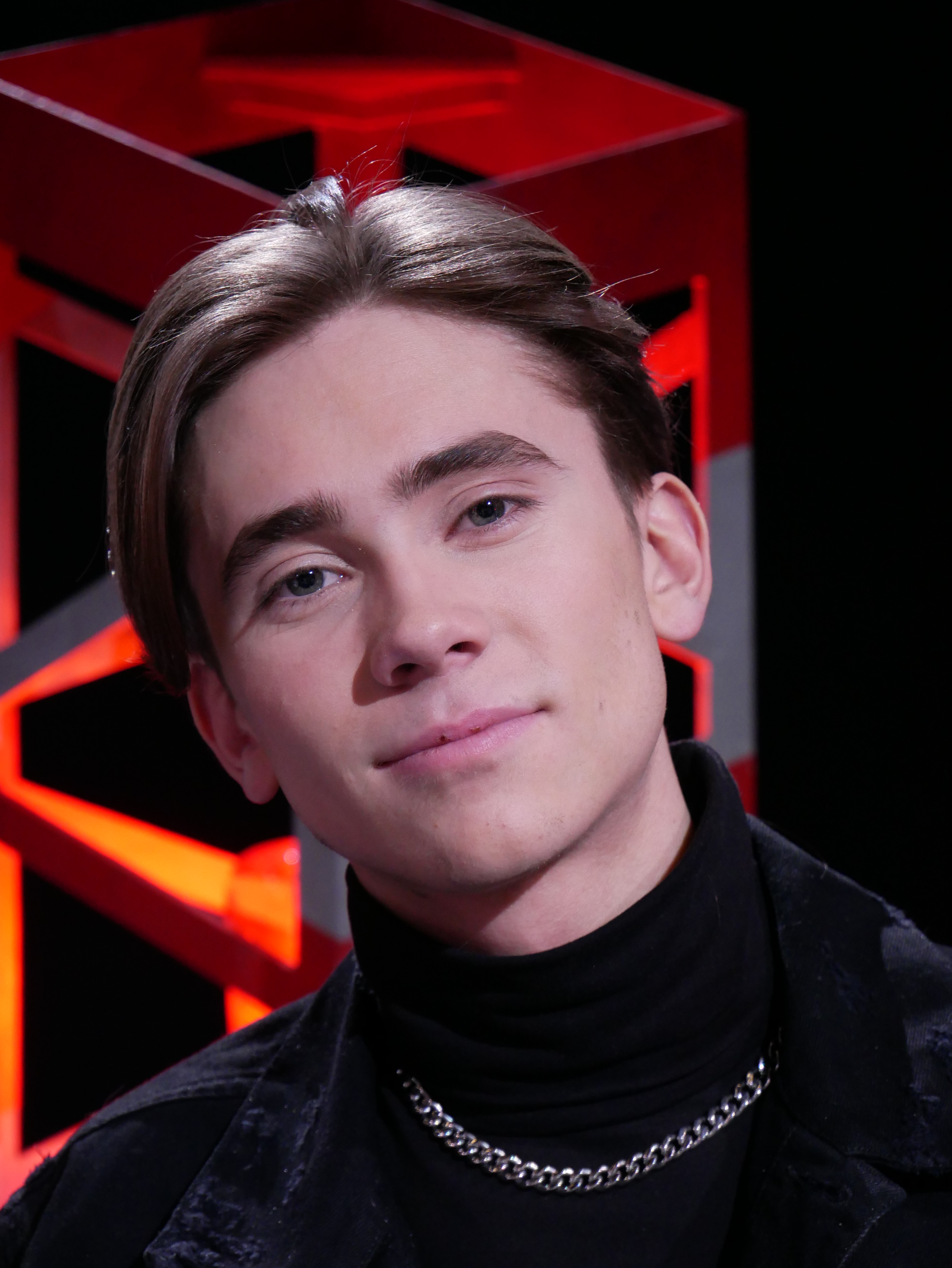
Felix Sandman, who plays Jonas, has already starred in another Netflix original series, Quicksand

Johanne then tries to find a boyfriend through speed dating, internet dating, and other means. She goes on dates with several men, including 19 year old Jonas (Felix Sandman), and the much older Bengt Erik (Bjørn Skagestad). She also has a brief sexual encounter with Eira, one of her female coworkers.

None of this results in Johanne finding a boyfriend. In the last episode of season one, coworker Dr. Henrik tells her that he loves her. They are interrupted by a medical emergency before she can respond. She then goes to her parents' house for Christmas dinner. During dinner, the doorbell rings. The first season ends with a shot of Johanne's face as she opens the door, possibly for one of her suitors.

== Production ==
The series takes place in Oslo, with winter scenes taking place in the copper mining town of Røros. Unexpected warmth resulted in snow being transported from Røros Airport to create the winter scenes. It was produced by the Oslo Company, and financed and distributed by Netflix as an original series.

The idea for the show was created by two advertisement students, Amir Shaheen and Kristian Andersen, who derived the concept from the popular Nordic TV Christmas calendars, televised advent calendars with an episode broadcast each day of December until Christmas Eve. They decided not to draw inspiration from Christmas films but rather other Norwegian series such as the teenage series Skam. They pitched the idea to the Oslo Company.

The director of the series was Per-Olav Sørensen. Anna Gutto co-directed several episodes during the first season.

== Cast and characters ==
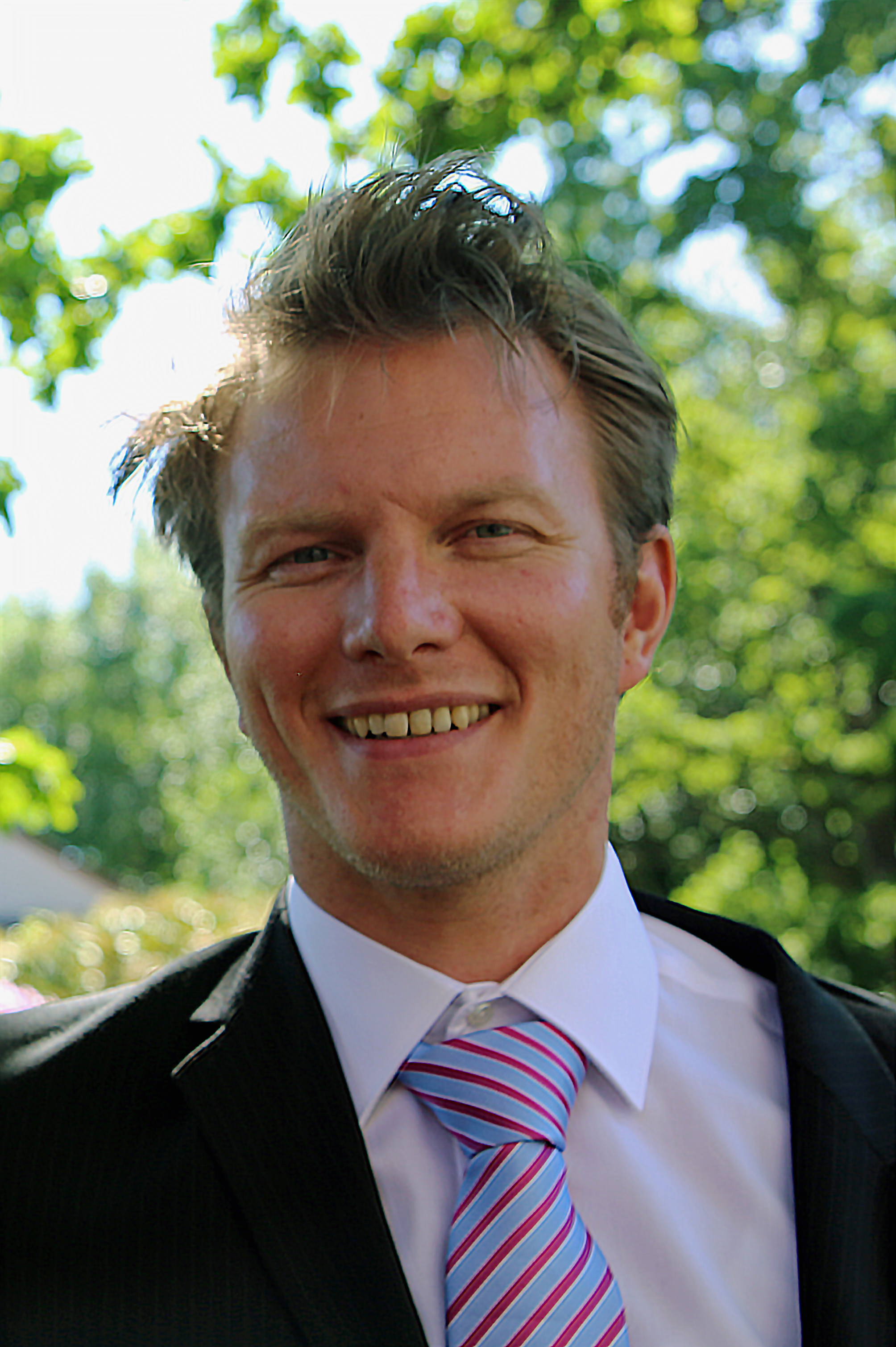
Oddgeir Thune, who plays Dr. Henrik

- Ida Elise Broch as Johanne, 30 year old nurse and protagonist
- Gabrielle Leithaug as Jørgunn, Johanne's roommate and best friend
- Dennis Storhøi as Tor, Johanne's father
- Anette Hoff as Jorid, Johanne's mother
- Ghita Nørby as Mrs. Nergaard, COPD patient at the hospital
- Hege Schøyen as Bente, manages the nurses at the hospital
- Bjørn Skagestad as Bengt Erik, politician and businessman
- Felix Sandman as Jonas, 19 year old Johanne meets online
- Line Verndal as Eira, works at the hospital
- Oddgeir Thune as Henrik, a doctor
- Iselin Shumba as Jeanette, good friend to Johanne, has children with Trym
- Gard Løkke as Bo

== Episodes ==
| Series | Episodes | Originally released |
|---|---|---|
| 1 | 6 | 5 December 2019 |
| 2 | 6 | 18 December 2020 |
| 3 | 8 | 12 December 2025 |

=== Season 1 (2019) ===
| No. overall | No. in season | Title | Original release date |
|---|---|---|---|
| 1 | 1 | "The Big Christmas Lie" | 5 December 2019 |
After lying to her nosy family about having a boyfriend, Johanne sets out to find the real thing in time to introduce him at Christmas.
| 2 | 2 | "Heavy Dating" | 5 December 2019 |
Johanne goes all-in on the dating scene, hitting the town with a variety of suitors -- some more worthy than others.
| 3 | 3 | "Sugar Baby? Sugar Daddy?" | 5 December 2019 |
Just as Johanne finds herself falling for Jonas, his polar opposite asks her out. Complicating matters: iffy and unsolicited advice from all angles.
| 4 | 4 | "Party Flirting" | 5 December 2019 |
Sparks fly and punches are thrown at Johanne's hospital Christmas party. Later, a ride on the bus takes an unexpected turn.
| 5 | 5 | "Heartache" | 5 December 2019 |
After bumping into a few old flames, Johanne realizes she has real feelings for Jonas and sets out to let him know.
| 6 | 6 | "The Final Christmas Countdown" | 5 December 2019 |
Johanne strives to make peace with her imperfect holiday season. But hold up -- Christmas may still have a few surprises in store!

=== Season 2 (2020) ===
| No. overall | No. in season | Title | Original release date |
|---|---|---|---|
| 7 | 1 | "Love You, Love You Not" | 18 December 2020 |
The person at Johanne's door is finally revealed. Over the course of a year, romantic bliss gives way to the realities of relationships.
| 8 | 2 | "Sweet Revenge" | 18 December 2020 |
Still reeling from her encounter with Henrik, Johanne pays her newly single father a visit. Later, Johanne goes drinking with a co-worker.
| 9 | 3 | "Stuck in the Past" | 18 December 2020 |
Johanne visits an ex-boyfriend, hoping for answers about their split. Later, her father accompanies her on an eventful trip to a tattoo studio.
| 10 | 4 | "Christmas Speed Dating" | 18 December 2020 |
Johanne strikes up a conversation with a handsome stranger while her good-natured neighbor, Nick, tries speed dating at a bar.
| 11 | 5 | "The Perfect Date" | 18 December 2020 |
A highly anticipated second date with Knut doesn't go as expected. As Christmas draws nearer, Johanne bumps into a friendly face.
| 12 | 6 | "Christmas Chaos" | 18 December 2020 |
It's Christmas Eve and between not burning the dinner, entertaining her guests and keeping Jonas off her mind, Johanne's just a little busy.

=== Season 3 (2025) ===
| No. overall | No. in season | Title | Original release date |
|---|---|---|---|
| 13 | 1 | "The Restart" | 12 December 2025 |
Finally ready to host this year's Christmas celebrations at her own home, Johanne discovers that the leaky pipes in her kitchen have other plans.
| 14 | 2 | "One-Night Stand" | 12 December 2025 |
Determined not to become a "Golden Monk," Johanne tries to put herself back out there — but her days of easy one-night-stands might be in the past.
| 15 | 3 | "Shock Date" | 12 December 2025 |
After a flirty exchange with a single father at a parent-teacher evening, dating is looking a little different for Johanne — but different is good, right?
| 16 | 4 | "Is it love in the air?" | 12 December 2025 |
Sometimes, taking on auntie duties means shielding family in times of crisis. Other times, it means dragging carpenter Bo out of his comfort zone.
| 17 | 5 | "The new guy - or the ex?" | 12 December 2025 |
When Johanne reluctantly decides to embrace a new Christmas tradition, a spark for the festive season reignites with the help of an unlikely confidant.
| 18 | 6 | "Heartbreak" | 12 December 2025 |
Dedicated to her work and the school play, Johanne shows up for everyone in her life — so why is it so hard for her to show up for herself?
| 19 | 7 | "Merry Lonely Christmas" | 12 December 2025 |
"Santa Johanne's Christmas Tour" begins as she makes a stop at all those near and dear to her... but something — or someone — seems to be missing.
| 20 | 8 | "New Year Surprise" | 12 December 2025 |
With an undeniably romantic gesture, and a kitchen worthy of a Christmas feast, Johanne wakes up to the heart breaking news that she may be too late.

== Reception ==
The series received mostly positive reviews. Verdens Gang gave it three out of six stars, likening it to a hybrid of Bridget Jones and Love Actually with a pointless narrative, but NRK called it a must-see for fans of Christmas romances and praised it for a well made atmosphere of Christmas hygge (coziness).

Leah Thomas of Cosmopolitan said "This soap opera drama series will have your jaw dropping with all the twists turns imaginable. Besides the fact that it's perfectly messy, I love this show because I have no idea who I want Johanne to end up with. Actually, I don't know if I even want her to end up with anyone, and I think that’s the entire point."

== See also ==
- List of Christmas films
