= Switch (2007 film) =

2007 Norwegian film directed by Ole Martin Hafsmo

- Directed by: Ole Martin Hafsmo
- Release date: 2007
- Country: Norway
- Language: Norwegian

Switch is a 2007 Norwegian snowboard film. The main actors are Sebastian Stigar, Ida Elise Broch, Peter Stormare and Hilde Lyrån. The film was nominated for an Amanda for the best youth film, but finished in second place, behind Mannen som elsket Yngve (The man who loved Yngve).
