= The Wife (2017 film) =

2017 film by Björn Runge

- Theatrical release poster
- Directed by: Björn L. Runge
- Screenplay by: Jane Anderson
- Based on: The Wife by Meg Wolitzer
- Produced by: Rosalie Swedlin; Meta Louise Foldager; Piers Tempest; Piodor Gustafsson; Claudia Bluemhuber
- Starring: Glenn Close; Jonathan Pryce; Christian Slater; Max Irons; Annie Starke; Harry Lloyd; Elizabeth McGovern
- Narrated by: Glenn Close
- Cinematography: Ulf Brantås
- Edited by: Lena Runge
- Music by: Jocelyn Pook
- Production companies: Silver Reel; Meta Film London; Anonymous Content; Tempo Productions; Embankment Films; Creative Scotland; Spark Film and Television; Film i Väst
- Distributed by: Picturehouse Entertainment (United Kingdom); Sony Pictures Classics (United States); SF Studios (Sweden)
- Release dates: September 12, 2017 (TIFF); August 17, 2018 (United States); September 28, 2018 (United Kingdom); December 7, 2018 (Sweden)
- Running time: 105 minutes
- Countries: Sweden; United Kingdom; United States
- Language: English
- Budget: $7 million
- Box office: $20 million

The Wife is a 2017 drama film directed by Björn L. Runge and written by Jane Anderson, based on the 2003 novel of the same name by Meg Wolitzer. It stars Glenn Close, Jonathan Pryce, and Christian Slater, and follows a woman (Close) who questions her life choices as she travels to Stockholm with her husband (Pryce), who is set to receive the Nobel Prize in Literature.

The film premiered at the 2017 Toronto International Film Festival on September 12, 2017, and was theatrically released in the United States on August 17, 2018, by Sony Pictures Classics. It received generally positive reviews from critics, with Close's performance garnering widespread acclaim. She won the Golden Globe Award, Screen Actors Guild Award, Independent Spirit Award and Critics' Choice Movie Award for Best Actress for her performance, and was also nominated for the Academy Award and BAFTA Award for Best Actress.

== Plot ==
In 1992, Joseph Castleman wins the Nobel Prize in Literature, but his wife Joan seems strangely unhappy about it. Their adult son David, who idolizes his father, seeks critique of his first short story, which Joe keeps putting off. The trio flies to Stockholm as Nathaniel Bone, a biographer with a taste for scandal, tries to ingratiate himself with the Castlemans. Joan's unhappiness worsens as adulation is heaped on Joseph. His attempts to publicly thank her for supporting him embitter her further.

At Smith College in 1958, a young Joan Archer, a college student and aspiring writer, is awed by her professor Joseph Castleman, a handsome, young, married man, and his force of personality and advice. Later, Joan meets a published alumna author, Elaine Mozell, whose cynical view of opportunities available to female writers disheartens her.

In Stockholm in 1992, Nathaniel, sensing Joan's emotional state, induces her to talk with him over drinks and says that he believes Joan has ghostwritten a major portion or even all of each of Joe’s novels. While Joan admits nothing, Nathaniel is convinced by their conversation that he is correct. Meanwhile, Joe begins to seduce a young photographer assigned to him, but just as he begins his seduction, his watch alarm goes off for him to take his heart pills, cooling the moment, and she leaves the room. Joe accuses Joan of abandoning him, while Joan expresses outrage over his attempted affair. The argument ceases when they learn that their daughter Susannah has given birth to their grandson, Max.

In 1960, Joe has been fired for having an affair with Joan, and his first attempt at writing a novel turns out very poorly. Joan, a secretary at a publishing house, observes how the all-male editors dismiss women writers. When Joan criticizes Joe's work, he threatens to end his relationship with her, claiming she cannot love "a hack". Joan agrees to fix Joe's novel for him. The work, titled The Walnut, is published and becomes a bestseller.

On the night of the Nobel ceremony, David confronts his parents after being told by Nathaniel that Joan is the real writer in the family. Joe and Joan deny everything. At the ceremony and the banquet which follows, Joan feels increasingly humiliated because Joe praises her as his support, his muse, his soul, further cementing her into “The Wife” role. She flees, and Joe follows her. He demands that she take his prize, but she refuses.

At their hotel, Joan tells Joe she is divorcing him. They argue violently, and Joe has a heart attack. Before he dies, he begs for Joan's love. She tells him she loves him; he calls her a good liar before dying. On the Concorde flight back to the US, Nathaniel offers his condolences to Joan. She tells him that if he tries to print anything that undermines Joseph's reputation as a writer, she will sue him. David overhears her. Joan says she will tell David and his sister the truth when they get home. She then turns the page to the journal she had opened, runs her hand over a blank page, and looks up.

== Cast ==
- Glenn Close as Joan Castleman (née Archer)
  - Annie Starke as Young Joan
- Jonathan Pryce as Professor Joseph "Joe" Castleman
  - Harry Lloyd as Young Joe
- Christian Slater as Nathaniel Bone
- Max Irons as David Castleman
- Karin Franz Körlof as Linnea
- Johan Widerberg as Walter Bark
- Elizabeth McGovern as Elaine Mozell
- Alix Wilton Regan as Susannah Castleman

== Production ==
On May 16, 2014, it was reported that Glenn Close would star in an adaptation of the Meg Wolitzer novel The Wife. The film was directed by Björn Runge and written by Jane Anderson. On January 30, 2015, Frances McDormand, Logan Lerman, Brit Marling, Jonathan Pryce, and Christian Slater were announced as having also been cast. On October 19, 2016, Pryce and Slater's involvement was confirmed, and Elizabeth McGovern, Max Irons, and Close's daughter Annie Starke joined the cast, playing the roles originally set with McDormand, Lerman, and Marling, respectively; Harry Lloyd was also added. Close approached Gary Oldman for the part of Joe Castleman but he was unavailable for the role. The Wife shot scenes in Glasgow, Edinburgh, and Arbigland Estate in Dumfries.

== Reception ==
=== Box office ===
The Wife grossed $9.6 million in the United States and Canada, and $8.8 million in other territories, for a worldwide total of $18.4 million.

In its first weekend of limited release, The Wife grossed $111,137 from four theaters, for an average of $27,784, the best of the weekend. It expanded to 18 theaters in its second weekend, making $212,714.

=== Critical response ===
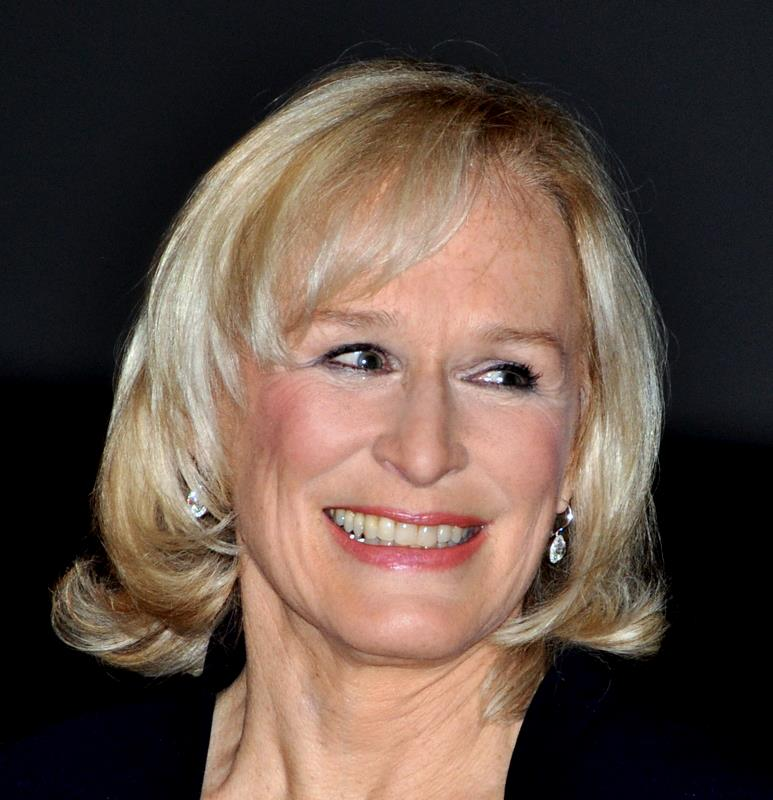
Glenn Close's performance received widespread critical acclaim, earning her a nomination for the Academy Award for Best Actress.

On review aggregator Rotten Tomatoes, the film holds an approval rating of 85% based on 234 reviews, and an average rating of 7.1/10. The website's critical consensus reads, "The Wife relies on the strength of Glenn Close's performance to drive home the power of its story—and she proves thoroughly, grippingly up to the task." On Metacritic, the film has a weighted average score of 77 out of 100, based on 36 critics, indicating "generally favorable reviews".

Peter Travers gave the film four out of five stars in Rolling Stone, calling Close's acting a "tour-de-force", and saying she "takes it to the next level with a powerfully implosive performance that doubles as an accumulation of details that define a marriage. She never telegraphs Joan's feelings, letting them unravel slowly as we watch her attend parties as a buildup to the big night." The chief film critic for The Observer Mark Kermode described the movie as a "Stockholm syndrome with a twist", while Glenn Close, interviewed by Robbie Collin for The Daily Telegraph, described it as "part-period piece, part-love story, part-Bergmanesque drama—so much so the latter that it could have been called Scenes from a Marriage." Citing the screening coordinator Peggy Siegal, Bill McCuddy of the Gold Derby called The Wife "the perfect '#MeToo' film" and defined it as Oscar bait.

San Diego Reader writer Scott Marks gave the film one out of five stars and criticized the film's simplicity, writing: "It might not have been so bad had the road to the big reveal been paved with insight and originality, but other than the performances, there is nothing here audiences haven't seen more times than they have their own feet." Writing for the Chicago Reader, Ben Sachs wrote: "Because the performances are so calculated, the emotional outbursts on which the story hinges fail to make a dramatic impact. And for a film about a novelist, The Wife conveys very little sense of what it's like to read or write."

== Accolades ==
| Award | Date of ceremony | Category | Recipient(s) and nominee(s) | Result | Ref(s) |
|---|---|---|---|---|---|
| AACTA International Awards | January 4, 2019 | Best Actress | Glenn Close | Nominated | |
| Academy Awards | February 24, 2019 | Best Actress | Glenn Close | Nominated | |
| Alliance of Women Film Journalists | January 20, 2019 | Best Actress | Glenn Close | Nominated | |
| Alliance of Women Film Journalists | January 20, 2019 | Actress Defying Age and Ageism | Glenn Close | Nominated | |
| British Academy Film Awards | February 10, 2019 | Best Actress in a Leading Role | Glenn Close | Nominated | |
| Capri Hollywood International Film Festival | January 2, 2019 | Best Actress | Glenn Close | Won | |
| Capri Hollywood International Film Festival | January 2, 2019 | Best Supporting Actor | Jonathan Pryce | Won | |
| Critics' Choice Movie Awards | January 13, 2019 | Best Actress | Glenn Close | Won | |
| Dallas–Fort Worth Film Critics Association | December 17, 2018 | Best Actress | Glenn Close | 4th place | |
| Film by the Sea Festival | Set 7-16, 2018 | Best Film and Literature | The Wife | Nominated | |
| Florida Film Critics Circle | December 21, 2018 | Best Actress | Glenn Close | Nominated | |
| Gotham Awards | November 26, 2018 | Best Actress | Glenn Close | Nominated | |
| Golden Globe Awards | January 6, 2019 | Best Actress – Motion Picture Drama | Glenn Close | Won | |
| Hollywood Film Awards | November 4, 2018 | Best Actress | Glenn Close | Won | |
| Houston Film Critics Society | January 3, 2019 | Best Actress | Glenn Close | Nominated | |
| Independent Spirit Awards | February 23, 2019 | Best Female Lead | Glenn Close | Won | |
| London Film Critics' Circle | January 20, 2019 | Actress of the Year | Glenn Close | Nominated | |
| Palm Springs International Film Festival | January 3, 2019 | Icon Award | Glenn Close | Won | |
| San Diego Film Critics Society | December 10, 2018 | Best Actress | Glenn Close | Won | |
| Satellite Awards | February 17, 2019 | Best Actress in a Motion Picture, Drama | Glenn Close | Won | |
| Screen Actors Guild Awards | January 27, 2019 | Outstanding Performance by a Female Actor in a Leading Role | Glenn Close | Won | |
| St. Louis Gateway Film Critics Association | December 16, 2018 | Best Actress | Glenn Close | Nominated | |
| Washington D.C. Area Film Critics Association | December 3, 2018 | Best Actress | Glenn Close | Nominated | |
| Women Film Critics Circle | December 11, 2018 | The Invisible Woman Award | Glenn Close | Won | |
| Women's Image Network Awards | February 22, 2019 | Best Film Actress | Glenn Close | Won | |
| Women's Image Network Awards | February 22, 2019 | Best Film Written By a Woman | Jane Anderson | Won | |
