= Fenris (TV series) =

Norwegian television series

- Norwegian: Fenris (TV-serie)
- Genre: Crime, drama
- Created by: Simen Alsvik, Magnus Monn-Iversen
- Written by: Simen Alsvik, Maren Skolem, Nikolaj Scherfig
- Directed by: Simen Alsvik
- Starring: Ida Elise Broch; Magnus Krepper; Cengiz Al; Jan Gunnar Røise; Ingjerd Egeberg
- Music by: Uno Helmersson
- Country of origin: Norway
- Original language: Norwegian
- No. of series: 1
- No. of episodes: 6

Production
- Executive producer: Sveinung Golimo
- Producer: Sigurd Mikal Karoliussen
- Cinematography: Johan-Fredrik Bødtker, Jon Gaute Espevold
- Running time: 45 min.
- Production company: Nordisk Film Production AS

Original release
- Network: Multi, Viaplay
- Release: 25 September 2022

Fenris is a Norwegian TV crime drama series. It was broadcast on network Multi and released for streaming on Viaplay 25 September 2022. Its six episodes were directed by Simen Alsvik, created by Alsvik with Magnus Monn-Iversen, and written by Alsvik, Maren Skolem and Nikolaj Scherfig. Fenris was filmed in Folldal, Nord-Østerdal during September 2021, and is set in Østbygda, Innlandet county near Norway's border with Sweden. It depicts struggles between conservationists protecting wild wolves and farmers and shooters, who agitate for open culling.

Lead protagonist Emma (Ida Elise Broch) returns to her home town to update wolf distribution for SNO (Norwegian: Statens naturoppsyn, English: Norwegian Nature Inspectorate) after her estranged father and wolf researcher Marius (Magnus Krepper) stops reporting. In August 2022 teenager Daniel (Alfred Vatne) goes missing; most locals blame the wolves. Other major roles are journalist Naim (Cengiz Al), police sheriff Asbjørn (Jan Gunnar Røise) and his sister Anne (Ingjerd Egeberg), the town's mayor.

== Plot ==
15-year-old Daniel disappears in early August 2022, he studied wolves in Innlandet county. Emma returns to her home town Østbygda with her son Leo. She asks her father Marius why he stopped reporting wolf numbers. Emma finds Daniel's coat, which is bloodied and has wolf hairs. Asbjørn organises search patrols while investigating Daniel's parents and associates. The locals quickly blame wolves and Marius; with their animosity being fueled by Naim's alarmist reports. It's soon discovered wolf hair found on Daniel's coat belongs to the alpha-male, Fenris, which disappeared in June. Emma believes the blood and wolf hair on the coat were planted in order to draw suspicion away from the perpetrator. A few days later, Marius also goes missing. Emma eventually finds his corpse in a distant cabin. While local police, led by Asbjørn, determine it was suicide, Asbjørn is seen hiding evidence as he leaves the cabin. Due to suspicious timing of Daniel's disappearance and Marius' death, Naim begins to doubt Daniel was attacked by a wolf. Leo is abducted by Stian's gang, smeared with meat, and tied to a tree. The next day, Tuva convinces Stian to help locate Leo, who is later rescued.

Asbjørn authorises a local wolf cull. Emma thwarts hunters by removing the female wolf's tracking collar. While tracking the wolf with Emma, Naim is injured by an illegal bear trap. Jan and Anne promote their wilderness lodge project to investors. Adrian declares his love for Elvira. Jan blackmailed Marius into giving him the GPS tracker due to Jan discovering Marius had been having an affair with Elvira. Jan the. poached Fenris and unintentionally injured Sunniva. Asbjørn, Jan's uncle, covered up both events. Adrian tries to help Jan by kidnapping Daniel and hiding him on a farmhouse in Sweden. Emma finds Fenris' carcass and tells Asbjørn to cancel hunt permits. Asbjørn takes Emma to farmhouse where Jan shoots Adrian and Asbjørn. Jan puts Emma in basement with Daniel and starts gassing them with car exhaust. Tuva and police arrive. Tuva kills Jan and rescues Emma and Daniel. Tuva re-investigates the mountain cabin crime scene and ultimately determines Marius had been murdered. Emma discovers Anne previously had an affair with Marius and they would meet at the cabin to maintain privacy. Anne killed Marius.

== Cast and characters ==
- Ida Elise Broch as Emma Salomonsen: Oslo-based SNO (Norwegian: Statens naturoppsyn, English: Norwegian Nature Inspectorate) researcher, Marius' daughter, Leo's mother.
  - Julia Aicha Chikhaoui as Emma as a child, raised by grandparents after her mother died.
- Magnus Krepper as Marius Storhammar: Østbygda resident, ardent wild wolf conservationist, SNO front-line data logger, Emma's father.
- Cengiz Al as Naim Karimi: Oslo-based journalist, visiting Østbygda, investigates Daniel's disappearance, initially blames wolves but changes his mind.
- Jan Gunnar Røise as Asbjørn Kolomoen: Østbygda sheriff, organises search for Daniel, Anne's brother.
- Ingjerd Egeberg as Anne Kolomoen: Østbygda mayor, Asbjørn's sister, plans for wilderness lodge.
- John Emil Jørgensrud as Knut Ove: hunter, former sawmill worker, Kathinka's partner, Daniel's stepfather.
- Helena F. Ødven as Elvira Erickstan: 15-year-old student, Madeleine's daughter, Daniel's friend.
- Viljar Knutsen Bjaadal as Leo Salomonsen: 14-year-old Oslo student, Emma's son.
- Jonas Strand Gravli as Jan Petter Kolomoen: entrepreneurial businessman, proposes wilderness lodge to investors, Anne's older son.
- Tevje Espeland as Adrian Kolomoen: Anne's younger son, clumsy.
- Julia Schacht as Kathinka Belset: housewife, Daniel's mother, Knut's partner.
- Cato Skimten Storengen as Harald Gutu: sawmill worker, hunter, Knut's friend, Stian and Halvard's father.
- Kikki Stormo as Madeleine Erickstam: Elvira's mother.
- Kai Remlov as Johan Smestad: taxidermist, owns mountain cabin, which Marius rented.
- Øystein Røger as Jo Ås: Oslo-based SNO leader, Emma's boss.
- Ane Ulimoen Øverli as Tuva: Østbygda policewoman, works for Asbjørn.
- Per Schaanning as Ørnulf Vaset: Østbygda journalist for Østerdølen, liaises with Naim.
- Alfred Vatne as Daniel Belset: 15-year-old student, Elvira's friend, studies wolves with Marius, goes missing.
- Ole Jansen Ulfsby as Stian Gutu: older student, bullies children, Halvard's older brother.
- Sunniva Katinka Ødegaard as Sunniva Berger: 16-year-old student, supposedly shot herself: disfigured, partly paralysed.
- Simay Leblebicioglu as Stine: SNO researcher, works for Jo.
- Johannes Blåsternes as Carl Fredrik Eberhardt: potential lodge investor, courted by Jan and Anne.
- Baar Metcalfe Lindgren as Halvard Gutu: student, Stian's younger brother.
- Karin Hennie as Emmas Mor: "Emma's mother", Marius' wife, suicidal with mental problems, died in car accident.

== Reception ==
The Wall Street Journal's John Anderson observed "One of the intriguing things about the thoroughly engrossing Fenris is the multitude of possible motives among the villagers. And the varieties of their animal instinct." Writer for Prime News Print felt it is "Bold, gripping, and compelling, it's an exceptional series that accomplishes more by doing less... One of the most winning aspects of the series is its cinematography, which stands out among even other great Nordic noir series." Ida Elise Broch who portrays Emma Salomonsen compared her character Emma with Ibsen's Hedda Gabler, "an enigma... unapproachable and extremely complex." Prime News Print's reviewer praised Broch's portrayal of Emma, "a brilliant performance... her grit and her oft-concealed vulnerability... [her] emotional trajectory is a sight to behold."

== Episodes ==
No. in season	Title	Directed by	Written by	Original release date
1	"Disappeared" (Forsvunnet)	Simen Alsvik	Simen Alsvik, Maren Skolem, Nikolaj Scherfig	25 September 2022
Marius views video of Daniel in forest. Teacher asks Kathinka about Daniel's absences. Kathinka believes Daniel stayed with Madeleine and Elvira. Flashback: Young Emma observes Marius and Mother struggling, Mother runs off. Present: Jo annoyed by Marius shirking his duties. Not Emma's responsibility. Emma checks tracking data. Emma and Leo pack bags; they are going wolf tagging. Emma drives to Østbygda. Elvira has not seen Daniel since Friday. Emma scolds Marius for not tagging wolf pups or reporting to SNO. Ørnulf asks Jan about wilderness lodge. Jan fobs him off. Asbjørn interviews Kathinka and Knut. Knut objects to Asbjørn's inference they caused Daniel's disappearance. Marius shows Leo how SNO tracks she-wolf. Asbjørn starts search patrols from Glomma River. Asbjørn's too busy to answer Naim's questions. Halvard tells Stian that Daniel's missing. Stian disposes of mincemeat bag before patrol arrives. Emma prepares tranquilliser rifle. Naim surmises that wolves attacked Daniel. Emma's group tags wolf pups. Stine tells Jo that hairs were analysed for Marius. Jo informs Emma they found Fenris' hairs and human blood. Kathinka acknowledges that Daniel studied wolves with Marius. Emma drops Marius and Leo at local cafe. At home Emma finds Daniel's coat with blood and wolf hairs.
2	"The Cabin" (Hytta)	Simen Alsvik	Simen Alsvik, Maren Skolem, Nikolaj Scherfig	25 September 2022
Emma returns to Leo and Marius. Harald accosts Marius. Jan advises Marius that hunters intend killing she-wolf. Marius drives off, stranding Emma and Leo. At home Leo discovers Johan's money. Oslo Editor requires evidence from Naim that wolves took Daniel. Emma meets Kathinka. Flashback: Grandmother collects young Emma. Present: Stine speculates that Marius knew hairs were from Fenris. Jo orders Emma to inform police about coat. Emma wants Marius' explanation first. Naim grills Emma about wolves attacking Daniel. Emma counters that no wolf has attacked humans for 200 years. Elvira defends student bullied by Stian; Stian verbally abuses Elvira. Johan describes how Marius rented his mountain cabin. Elvira brings Naim to Daniel's forest hut, where Naim photographs drawings. Asbjørn confronts Knut about lying for his alibi: has not been at sawmill since June. Knut repaired his brother's floor. Emma does not find Marius at Johan's cabin. Stine informs Asbjørn about Marius' testing wolf hairs. Police ask Kathinka for Daniel's DNA. Emma replies to Asbjørn that wolf hairs were planted on coat. Emma notices male's collar switched on, near Johan's cabin. Naim's article declares Daniel attacked by wolf and Marius hid information. In cabin Emma discovers Fenris' collar and Marius' corpse.
3	"Confirmation" (Bekreftelsen)	Simen Alsvik	Simen Alsvik, Maren Skolem, Nikolaj Scherfig	25 September 2022
Flashback: Marius teaches Emma about wolves. Present: Asbjørn determines that Marius suicided. Tuva questions Emma; Asbjørn hides evidence. Emma disbelieves suicide speculation. Naim learns that Marius killed himself. Emma to Kathinka: Marius died. Leo tells Elvira that Daniel's too big for wolf. Stian bullies child, Elvira intervenes, Stian sets fire to Elvira's hair. Adrian rescues Elvira and Leo. Emma describes how Marius' logs show no wolves were near when Daniel disappeared. Nevertheless Jo concludes Fenris got Daniel. Anne enthusiastic that soon they will have hunting permits. Adrian leaves Elvira and Leo at Madeleine's. Officials declare that Daniel was attacked by Fenris. Jo relates Marius' voicemail, certain suicide. Asbjørn informs hunters to wait for permits. Harald and Knut rail at delay. Stian's gang baiting wolves; dare each other to stay overnight. Elvira recounts how Sunniva shot herself; now brain-damaged. Jo plays Marius voicemail; Emma believes Marius was coerced. Ørnulf describes how Marius was hounded before Naim's articles. Madeleine announces that Marius killed himself. Leo runs off, crying. Armed with tranquilliser rifle Emma prevents Knut stealing SNO's wolf tracker. Stian's gang tie Leo to tree, they smear Leo with meat. Drunken Emma asks apologetic Naim to decrypt a file. Exhausted, Emma sleeps.
4	"Mothers" (Mødre)	Simen Alsvik	Simen Alsvik, Maren Skolem, Nikolaj Scherfig	25 September 2022
While fishing Ørnulf discovers Daniel's boot. Flashback: Emma sees her mother passed out, medication nearby. Present: Naim tells Emma to report Leo's disappearance. Asbjørn asks Kathinka to identify boot. Kathinka claims it's not Daniel's boot. Madeleine tells Elvira not to associate with Adrian; Adrian will believe Elvira loves him. Asbjørn cautions Knut to wait for permits. Emma asks various locals for Leo. Asbjørn is certain that Daniel's dead. Johan collects Marius' belongings from his cabin. Jan berates Adrian for firing gun at pottery. Adrian asks to drive Anne's car. Stian taunts Elvira that Leo might go missing. While hunting without permit, Knut sets bear trap. Tuva detects Leo's phone in forest. Elvira sees Stian's social media video; Leo tied to tree. Tuva advises Emma of video. Asbjørn angrily questions Stian, who denies everything. Emma bursts into interrogation room, attacks Stian but Asbjørn holds her off. Jan successfully promotes wilderness lodge project to Carl. After describing social repercussions, Tuva calmly convinces Stian to help find Leo. Emma and police discover Leo. Leo describes how Stian baits wolves. Decrypted file had blackmail video of Marius seducing Elvira. Emma and Leo due to return to Oslo. Daniel held in farmhouse, fed by kidnapper.
5	"The Unveilling" (Opprullingen)	Simen Alsvik	Simen Alsvik, Maren Skolem, Nikolaj Scherfig	25 September 2022
Asbjørn observes Sunniva spoon-fed in aged care facility. Permits have been issued, Emma ordered to give hunters wolf tracker. As pups would die after mother killed; Emma decides to disrupt hunt. Knut and Kathinka argue and Kathinka locks Knut out. Naim joins Emma. Jan decides Adrian cannot work at lodge, he's too destructive. Emma trails wolves. Naim triggers bear trap. Emma tranquillises she-wolf, removes collar, lures hunters away, deactivates tracker. Jo asks Emma why wolf tracker stopped; emailed trail camera footage. Knut demands Tuva arrest Emma. Naim told that Fenris' tracker stopped in June. Naim shows Emma blackmail video. Kathinka leaves Knut and relocates to Madeleine's. Johan drops off Marius' belongings. Anne stops Adrian and Jan fighting. Emma sees Fenris' tracker was shot. Adrian professes his love for Elvira. Anne and Asbjørn talk. Emma digs where Fenris last located, finds his carcass. Daniel wakes, exits farmhouse. Emma suggest Naim have Leo access trail camera footage. Naim sees Daniel caught and dragged away by man. Naim sends footage to Jo; Fenris already dead. Emma orders Asbjørn to call off hunt; Fenris killed in June. Naim checks news archives: Asbjørn found injured Sunniva same day Fenris was killed. Daniel recaptured by Jan.
6	"The Showdown" (Teppefall)	Simen Alsvik	Simen Alsvik, Maren Skolem, Nikolaj Scherfig	25 September 2022
Jan drives Daniel back to farmhouse. Adrian refuses to kill Daniel despite Jan's orders. Asbjørn takes Emma across border to Sweden. Daniel saw Jan kill wolf, shoot Sunniva. Jan connects car exhaust to basement vent. Jan shoots Adrian. Leo and Naim check logs; Emma's transmitter activated. Asbjørn and Emma at farmhouse. Adrian's laying down, hurt. Jan refuses to submit; shoots Asbjørn. Emma runs off; Jan knocks her out; puts her in basement alongside Daniel. Jan starts car, gas enters vent. Tuva and police arrive at farmhouse. Tuva disbelieves Jan's explanation, kills Jan and removes hose. Flashback: Marius stops Mother burning house down. Present: Tuva rescues Emma and Daniel. Tuva questioned by police internal affairs. Jan poached Fenris using tracker from Marius. Marius' death was considered unsuspicious. Anne apologises to Adrian for ignoring Jan's bullying. Leo approves Emma's decision to fill-in Marius' position. Tuva promoted to captain. Leo reads eulogy as Emma and friends spread Marius' ashes. Emma deduces Anne had affair with Marius. Emma and Anne discuss Mother. Anne did not talk to Marius after affair. Tuva and Emma return to Johan's cabin; evidence shows Marius was murdered. Leo tells Anne that Emma's at cabin. Anne arrives; Emma attacks Anne.
