= Ida Elise Broch =

Norwegian actress

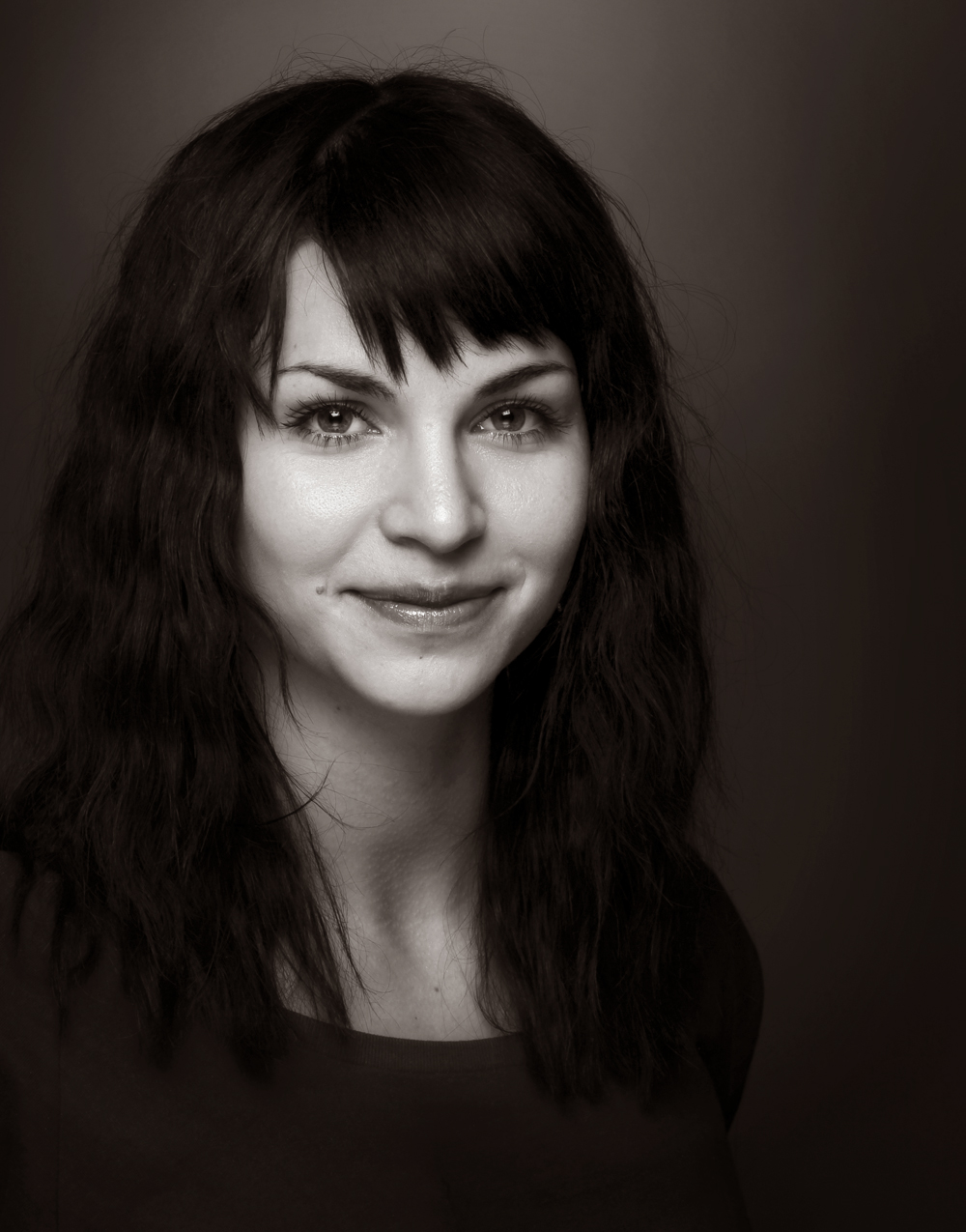
- Ida Elise Broch in 2012
- Born: 25 June 1987 (age 38); Oslo, Norway
- Occupation: Actress
- Years active: 2006–present

Ida Elise Broch (born 25 June 1987) is a Norwegian actress. She is the half-sister of Nicolai Cleve Broch and Christian Cleve Broch. Broch played Catherine in the film The Man Who Loved Yngve and had a starring role in the film Switch. She had a featured role in season 3 of the Netflix series Lilyhammer and starred in the Norwegian TV series The Third Eye, where she played police detective Mari Friis. She has also starred in two Netflix festive-themed series, Home for Christmas and A Storm for Christmas, as the lead role and as part of an ensemble cast respectively.

== Education ==
Broch has performed in plays since elementary school and studied drama at Hartvig Nissen School and Romerike Folk High School. She left school in the spring of 2007 in order to begin filming The Man Who Loved Yngve and joined the Norwegian National Academy of Theatre in the autumn of 2008.

== Filmography ==
- Bakkeflyvere (short) (2006)
- Switch (2007), as Nina
- The Man Who Loved Yngve (2008), as Cathrine Halsnes
- Twende (short) (2008), as Ella
- Amor (short) (2009), as Julie
- Pax (2010), as Elise
- Dark Souls (2011), as Maria
- Conqueror (TV series) (2012), as Kristin
- Detective Downs (2013), as Isabel Star
- Lilyhammer (2014), as Birgitte
- The Third Eye (2014), as Mari Friis
- Home for Christmas (Hjem til jul ) (2019–2025) as Johanne
- A Storm for Christmas (2022)
- Fenris (2022), as Emma Salomonsen

== Awards ==
- Gullruten 2015 as "Best Actress" for her role in Lilyhammer
