= Pax (2011 film) =

2011 Norwegian-Swedish film

- Film poster.
- Directed by: Annette Sjursen
- Written by: Annette Sjursen; Lars Saabye Christensen
- Based on: Pax by Annette Sjursen
- Produced by: Finn Gjerdum; Stein B. Kvae
- Starring: Ellen Dorrit Petersen; Kyrre Haugen Sydness; Ida Elise Broch; Samuel Fröler; Kristoffer Joner; Thomas von Brömssen; Anneke von der Lippe; Pia Tjelta; Ane Dahl Torp; Olivia Nystedt; Björn Granath
- Cinematography: Peter Mokrosinski
- Edited by: Einar Egeland
- Production company: Paradox AS
- Distributed by: Scanbox
- Release date: March 18, 2011
- Running time: 75 minutes
- Countries: Norway; Sweden
- Language: Norwegian
- Budget: NOK 22,555,000

Pax is a 2011 Norwegian-Swedish film directed by Annette Sjursen. It was released on March 18, 2011. The film stars many well-known Norwegian and Swedish actors, but was not well received by critics and was considered a flop.

== Plot ==
An engine of a Boeing 737 explodes midway during a flight from Stockholm, Sweden, to Oslo, Norway. Many on board thought the end was near, but for some, it was just a beginning. During the flight, we follow seven people and one heart, on its way from one person to the other. All seven people have something that they are fleeing from. But when the heavy airplane body falls to the ground, they imagine their lives in a secondary perspective.

== Reception ==
The film had a disastrous opening weekend with many critics asking what went wrong? In a review for Verdens Gang, Jon Selås said "there is no seriousness or ambition in 'Pax'." For NRK P3, Birger Vestmo wrote "Everything feels so hopelessly constructed: the lead-heavy script, the rigid characters, the embarrassing dialogue, the extreme coincidences and the improbability that make my eyes roll" Despite the film being marketed as the Nordic region's first disaster film, and featuring just about all of Norway's movie stars, critic Maria Moseng described it as "artistic suicide". Ingunn Økland said "When a movie tells you exactly what to feel, it becomes almost impossible to feel just that." For Adresseavisen, Terje Eidsvåg described the movie as "Obscene drama so loaded with trauma that it becomes embarrassing." The Dagsavisen critic said the film contained many examples of "pompous bullshit suffered by suffering actors, in a vain attempt to pretend that at least someone knows what they are doing" and nominated it as the worst film in Norwegian history.
