= The Position =

2005 novel by Meg Wolitzer

- Author: Meg Wolitzer
- Language: English
- Publisher: Scribner
- Publication date: March 8, 2005
- Publication place: United States
- Pages: 320
- ISBN: 0-7432-6178-X

The Position: A Novel is a 2005 novel by American writer Meg Wolitzer.

== Summary ==
It tells the story of a book titled Pleasuring: One Couple's Journey to Fulfillment and the effects it has on a family. The fictional book is a sex manual, much like The Joy of Sex. It was written by a married couple and is full of detailed illustrations of them engaged in numerous sexual positions. One day while the authors are out, their children discover the book and their lives are changed forever. The story looks at the effect the book has on their lives over the course of many decades, jumping forward decade by decade.

The author tells the story by switching between the different points of view of the members of the family. The parents are unaware the children have discovered the book, so their story is very different from the children's. It also explores how each character feels about the others. For example, the husband thinks his wife is the most sexually desirable woman to him on the Earth and feels he is the luckiest man alive. On the other hand, she feels her husband is too mechanical when it comes to sex, approaching it as some sort of scientific experiment.

== Reception ==
Kirkus Reviews described the book as "immensely readable, if occasionally flat". In The Observer, Anna Shapiro praised the writing, describing it as "beautifully developed", and stated that the tone of the book was one of "nuanced insight and observation". Writing for The New York Times, Choire Sicha praised the book's humor and charm, but stated that it felt "tepid" in comparison to other contemporary books about family alienation.

The author of the book, Meg Wolitzer, was a guest on NPR's program Fresh Air on May 10, 2005, discussing the book and her life as an author.
