= Meg Wolitzer =

American writer (born 1959)

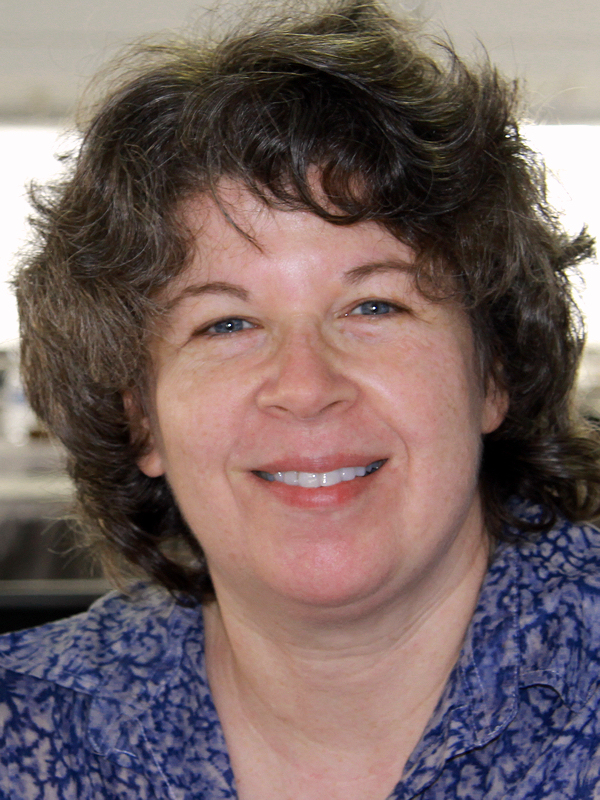
- Wolitzer at the 2011 Texas Book Festival, Austin
- Born: May 28, 1959 (age 67); New York City, U.S.
- Education: Smith College; Brown University
- Occupation: Writer
- Spouse: Richard Panek
- Writing career
- Period: 1982–present
- Genre: Literary fiction
- Notable works: The Ten-Year Nap, The Uncoupling, The Interestings
- Website: megwolitzer.com

Signature
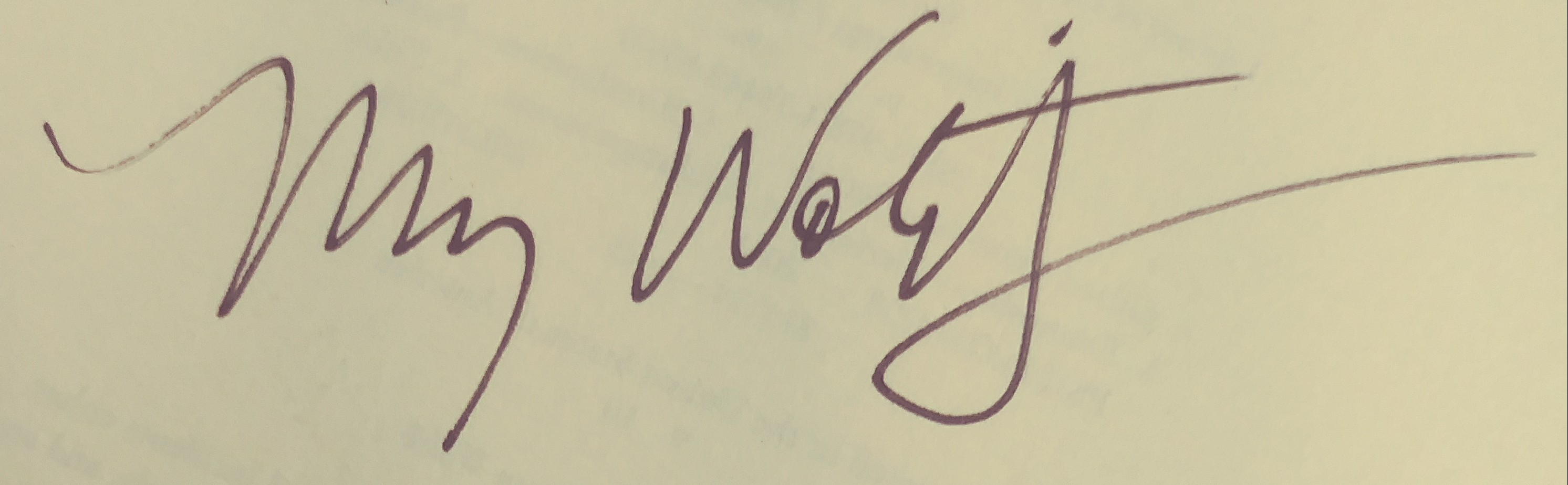

Meg Wolitzer (born May 28, 1959) is an American novelist, known for The Wife, The Ten-Year Nap, The Uncoupling, The Interestings, and The Female Persuasion. She is a co-director of the BookEnds writing fellowship program at Stony Brook Southampton.

== Life and career ==
Wolitzer was born in Brooklyn and raised in Syosset, New York, the daughter of novelist Hilma Wolitzer (née Liebman) and psychologist Morton Wolitzer. She was raised Jewish. Wolitzer studied creative writing at Smith College and graduated from Brown University in 1981.

She wrote her first novel, Sleepwalking, a story of three college girls obsessed with poetry and death, while still an undergraduate; it was published in 1982. Her following books include Hidden Pictures (1986), This Is Your Life (1988), Surrender, Dorothy (1998), The Wife (2003), The Position (2005), The Ten-Year Nap (2008), The Uncoupling (2011), and The Interestings (2013). Her short story "Tea at the House" was featured in 1998's Best American Short Stories collection. Her novel for younger readers, The Fingertips of Duncan Dorfman, was published in 2011.

She also co-authored, with Jesse Green, a book of cryptic crosswords, Nutcrackers: Devilishly Addictive Mind Twisters for the Insatiably Verbivorous (1991), and has written about the relative difficulty women writers face in gaining critical acclaim.

She has taught creative writing at the University of Iowa's Writers' Workshop, Skidmore College, and, most recently, was a guest artist at Princeton University. Over the past decade she has also taught at both Stony Brook Southampton's MFA in Creative Writing program and the Southampton Writers Conference and the Florence Writers Workshop. Three films have been based on her work: This Is My Life, scripted and directed by Nora Ephron; the 2006 made-for-television movie Surrender, Dorothy; and the 2017 drama The Wife, starring Glenn Close and Jonathan Pryce.

The Uncoupling was the subject of the first coast-to-coast virtual book club discussion, via Skype.

As of 2018, Wolitzer resides on the Upper West Side of Manhattan, with her husband, science writer Richard Panek.

== Works ==
=== Novels ===
- Sleepwalking (1982) ISBN 9781594633133, OCLC 862097178
- Hidden Pictures (1986)
- This Is Your Life (1988)
- Friends for Life 1994 ISBN 9780821750377, OCLC 32939325
- Surrender, Dorothy (1998)
- The Wife (2003) ISBN 9780099478195, OCLC 908803171
- The Position (2005)
- The Ten-Year Nap (2008) ISBN 9781594483547, OCLC 1003299133
- The Uncoupling (2011) ISBN 9781594485657, OCLC 1021096351
- The Fingertips of Duncan Dorfman (2011)
- The Interestings (2013) ISBN 9780099584094, OCLC 1001585374
- Belzhar (2014) ISBN 9780142426296, OCLC 904081649
- The Female Persuasion (2018) ISBN 9781594488405, OCLC 993689357
- To Night Owl from Dogfish (2019) ISBN 9781984815057

Children's books

- Millions of Maxes (2022)
