= A Stuffed Dog =

1986 play by Staffan Göthe

- Original title: En uppstoppad hund
- Original language: Swedish
- Written by: Staffan Göthe

A Stuffed Dog (Swedish: En uppstoppad hund) is a play by Staffan Göthe. It premiered at Norrbotten Theatre in 1986. It is set in the 1950s.

== Production history ==
A production directed by Finn Poulsen was staged at Uppsala City Theatre in 1992. The play premiered at Borås City Theatre on 25 November 1995. The play premiered for the first time outside of Scandinavia on 1 March 1997 in Dresden, Germany. A production was staged at Stockholm City Theatre in 2015, with direction by Olof Hanson.

== Television adaptation ==
It was adapted into a three-episode television miniseries by Kristina Humle and Antonia Pyk. It premiered in October 2006 on SVT1. The music was composed by Matti Bye.
