= Swedish Theatre Critics Association =

The Swedish Theatre Critics Association (in Swedish: Svenska teaterkritikers förening, in French: L'association Suédois des Critiques d'Art Dramatique) is a member organization of Sweden's professional theater critics. Founded in 1956, the organization is a member organization of two separate and larger organizations: the International Association of Theatre Critics (part of UNESCO) and the Swedish Theatre Union (in Swedish: Svenska Teaterunion). The organization helps support critics in contract negotiations, intellectual property rights, professional development, and in creating opportunities for critics to connect with one another. Each year the association also hands out a number of awards to favourites within the work of the performing arts of the stage, including the prestigious Swedish Theatre Critics' Award (given to an actor or director of the stage or to a specific theatre and/or ensemble), a Children and Youth Theatre Award (since 1985) and since 2004 also a Dance Award.
