= Staffan Göthe =

Swedish playwright, actor and director (born 1944)

- Born: 20 December 1944 (age 81)
- Education: Gothenburg Theatre Academy
- Occupations: Playwright; actor; director

Staffan Göthe (born 20 December 1944), is a Swedish playwright, actor and director. He is a professor at Malmö Theatre Academy (Teaterhögskolan i Malmö) at Lund University.

He was born on 20 December 1944 in Luleå.

Göthe graduated from the Gothenburg Theatre Academy in 1971.

In 2001, Göthe was awarded the Litteris et Artibus medal.

Plays by Göthe have been translated into English, German, Finnish and Estonian. His collected plays (22 out of the 23 works he had produced in the period 1971-2001) was published in 2003 as Lysande eländen (approx.: "Brilliant Miseries").

== List of works ==
=== Plays ===
==== In English translation ====
- A Stuffed Dog (Swedish: En uppstoppad hund; original from 1986, translation by Kim Dambæk) - Also filmed (in Swedish) by Sveriges Television in 2006 and broadcast late that year in the newly started high definition channel SVT HD.
- One Night in February (Swedish: En natt i februari; original from 1972, translation by Eivor Martinus)
- The Crying Policeman (Swedish: Den gråtande polisen; original from 1979, translation by Eivor Martinus)

==== Other ====
The English titles given are approximate translations.

- Tjejen i Aspen - The Girl in the Aspen, 1972
- Nordanvinden eller Den unge Lars i Wexiö skola - The North Wind or the Young Lars Wexiö School, 1973
- En Järntorgsrevy - An Iron Square Revue, 1974
- Rosens och Henrikas pjäs - The Play of The Rose and Henrika, 1974
- Den itusågade damen - The Lady Sawn in Half, 1975
- Mat & Logi - Food & Lodgings, 1977–1997
- Den feruketansvärda semällen - The Horibel Bagn, 1978
- Ballad om en skärbräda - Ballad of a Chopping-Board, 1982
- Fiskarna i haven - The Fishes In the Seas, 1984
- Arma Irma - Poor Irma, 1989
- Den perfekta kyssen - The Perfect Kiss, 1990
- Boogie-Woogie - Boogie-Woogie, 1992
- Blått hus med röda kinder - Blue House With Red Cheeks, 1994
- Ruben Pottas eländiga salonger - Might translate something like The Wretched Lounges of Ruben Chamberpot, 1996
- Legenderna från Oskarsvarv - The Legends of Oskarsvarv, 1996
- Homofiler kan inte vissla - Homos can't whistle, 1998
- Ett lysande elände - A Brilliant Misery, 1999
- Temperance - English title in original, 2000
- Byta trottoar - Changing sidewalks, 2001

=== Screenplay ===
- Magic Stronger Than Life - (Swedish Kärlekens himmelska helvete, literally The Heavenly Hell of Love), 1993

== Work as actor in film and television ==
Göthe has, starting with the mini-series Offside in 1971, appeared in several films and TV series, almost all of which are Swedish language productions (an exception is the Norwegian Ballen i øyet from 2000). These include, in addition to those already named (and some others): Agneta Fagerström-Olssons Magic Stronger Than Life (for which he also wrote the screenplay, as mentioned above); two episodes of the Anna Holt television series (1996); Beck – Spår i mörker (1997, part of the long series of TV movies with Peter Haber as Martin Beck); and My Bearded Mother (Swedish: Min skäggiga mamma), a 2003 short film directed by Maria Hedman that won a Guldbagge Award for best short film in 2004 as well as the Grand Prize of European Fantasy Short Film in Silver at Sweden Fantastic Film Festival in 2003.
