= Magnus Krepper =

Swedish actor, dancer, singer, and magician

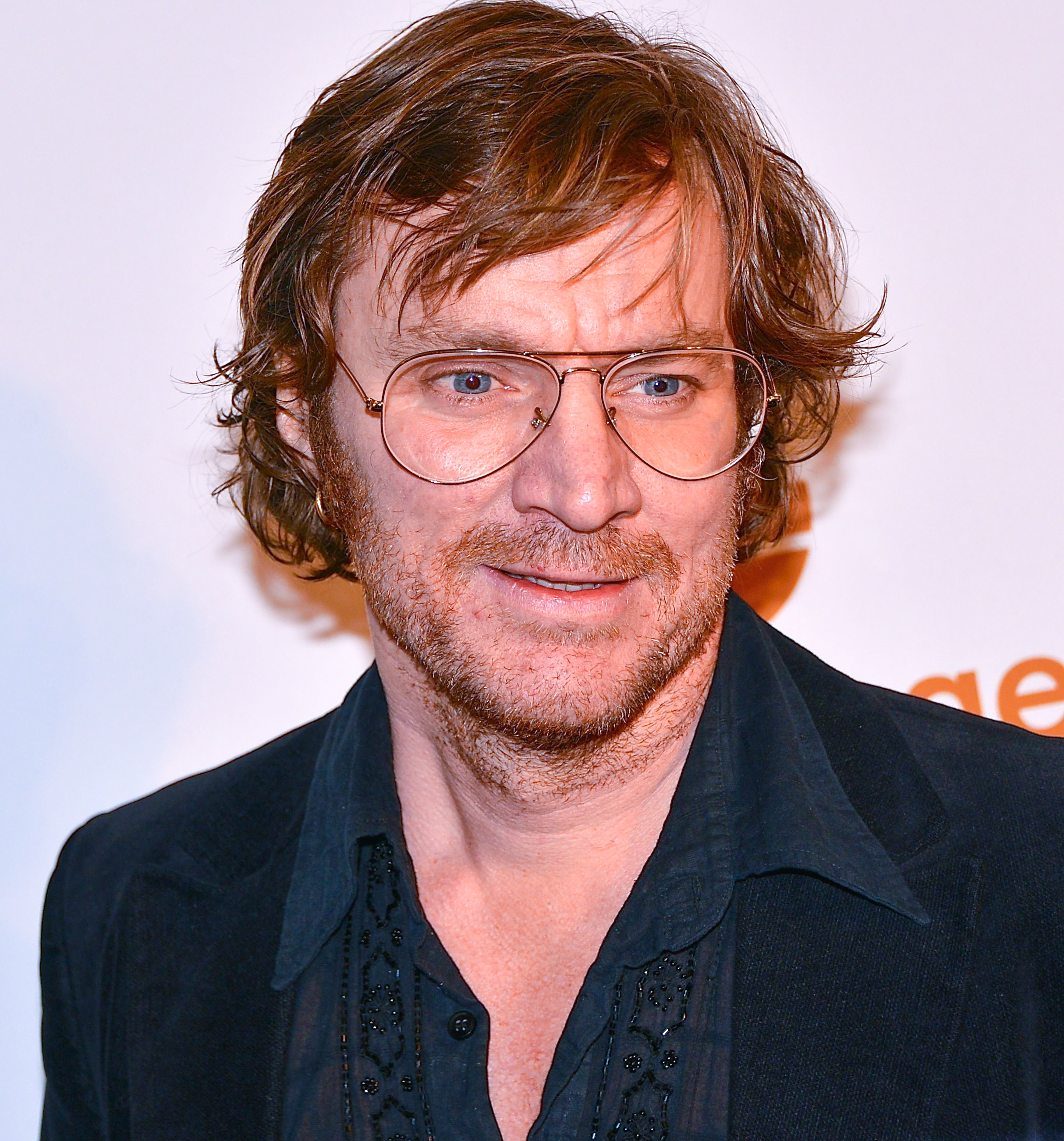
- Magnus Krepper in 2013.
- Born: Rolf Magnus Krepper; 10 January 1967 (age 59); Norrköping, Sweden
- Occupation: Actor
- Years active: 1994–present

Rolf Magnus Krepper (born 10 January 1967) is a Swedish actor, dancer, singer, and magician. He is a member of Moderna Illusionisters Cirkel.

In 2006, Krepper received the Guldbagge Award for best male role in the 2005 film Mun mot mun.

== Selected filmography ==
- 1994: Rena rama Rolf (TV Series) - Filip
- 1998: När karusellerna sover (TV Series) - Trollkarlen Igor Johansson
- 1999: Vägen ut - Holmlund
- 1999: Anna Holt – polis (TV Series) - Pikétchefen
- 2000: Det grovmaskiga nätet (TV Mini Series) - Våldsam patient
- 2001: Familjehemligheter - Kjell's Father
- 2001: As White as in Snow - Polish Artist
- 2002: Beck (TV Series) - Bengt Tavast
- 2002: Det brinner! (TV Mini Series) - Lasse
- 2003: Lejontämjaren - Björn Sundström
- 2003: Sprickorna i muren - Lars Herdin
- 2003: Misa mi - Pappa
- 2003: Om jag vänder mig om - Anders
- 2003: De drabbade (TV Mini Series) - Åke
- 2003–2007: Tusenbröder (TV Series) - Patrik
- 2004: Tre solan - Budbäraren
- 2004: Kniven i hjärtat (TV Mini Series)
- 2005: Mun mot mun - Morgan / Vera's pimp
- 2006: Tusenbröder – Återkomsten - Patrik
- 2008: Goda råd (Short) - Mats
- 2009: Oskyldigt dömd (TV Series) - Thomas Hjelte
- 2009: The Girl Who Played with Fire - Hans Faste
- 2009: The Girl Who Kicked the Hornets' Nest - Hans Faste
- 2010: Kommissarie Winter (TV Series) - Erik Winter
- 2010–2019: Solsidan (TV Series) - Palle
- 2010: Ond tro - Kommissarien
- 2011: Room 304 - Jonas
- 2011: Iris - Bruno
- 2011: Tatort (TV Series) - Stefan Enberg
- 2011: The Bridge (TV Series) - Stefan
- 2012: En plats i solen - Niklas Linde
- 2012: Call Girl - Statsministern
- 2013: Irl - Pappa Stefan
- 2013: Cayuco - Thomas
- 2014: Gentlemen - Stene Forman
- 2015: The Paradise Suite - Stig
- 2015–2016: Ditte & Louise (TV Series) - Erik
- 2016: All the Beauty - David 51
- 2016: The Red Trees (Short) - Alexander Lars Levín
- 2016: Devil's Bride - Nils Psilander
- 2016: A Cure for Wellness - Pieter the Vet
- 2017: Anchors Up - Grabben (voice)
- 2017–2019: Before We Die (TV Series) - Björn
- 2018: Liberty (TV Mini Series) - Jonas
- 2018: Becoming Astrid - Samuel
- 2018: Before the Frost - Art
- 2018: Før frosten - Gustav
- 2019: Queen of Hearts - Peter
- 2019: Undtagelsen (The Exception) - Gunnar
- 2021: Margrete den første - Johan Sparre
- 2021: JJ+E - Frank
- 2021: Deserted
- 2021: Love Gets a Room - Sergeant Szkop
- 2022: Fenris, 1 season – Marius Stenhammar
- 2022: Fucking Bornholm (Polish film by Anna Kazejak) – Mikkel
- 2023: The Promised Land – Hector
- 2025: The Chelsea Detective, Season 3, episodes 3&4 - Thomas Johansen
- 2025: A Year of School – Fred's father
