= Hilma Wolitzer =

American novelist

Hilma Wolitzer (born 1930) is an American novelist.

== Career ==
Wolitzer's first novel for adults, Ending, was published in 1974. In his review of the novel, lead New York Times critic Anatole Broyard wrote, “After finishing Wolitzer’s book, I felt as if I had been on the brink of the abyss, pulled back by a last‐minute reprieve. My first impulse was to rush out and live, to grasp at existence as every instant of it was climactic . . . Apocalyptic as sounds, Ending made me feel I never wanted to take anything for granted again. If you have ever smelled death, really recognized it, life is a miracle. You can understand Marie Antoinette's saying, to the executioner, on the platform of the guillotine, ‘one more moment of happiness!’” Ending was the loose basis for Bob Fosse's 1979 film All That Jazz.

The recipient of Guggenheim and NEA fellowships and an Award in Literature from the American Academy and Institute of Arts and Letters, Wolitzer wrote for the TV series Family.

== Personal life ==
Wolitzer's daughter, Meg Wolitzer, is also a writer.

== Bibliography ==
=== Novels ===
- Ending (1974)
- In the Flesh (1977)
- Hearts (1980)
- In the Palomar Arms (1983)
- Silver (1988)
- Tunnel of Love (1994)
- The Doctor's Daughter (2006)
- Summer Reading (2007)
- An Available Man (2012)

=== YA fiction ===
- Introducing Shirley Braverman (1975)
- Out of Love (1976)
- Toby Lived Here (1980)
- Wish You Were Here (1984)

=== Non-fiction ===
- The Company of Writers (2001)

=== Short story collections ===
- Today a Woman Went Mad in the Supermarket (2021)
