= Björn Runge =

Swedish director and author

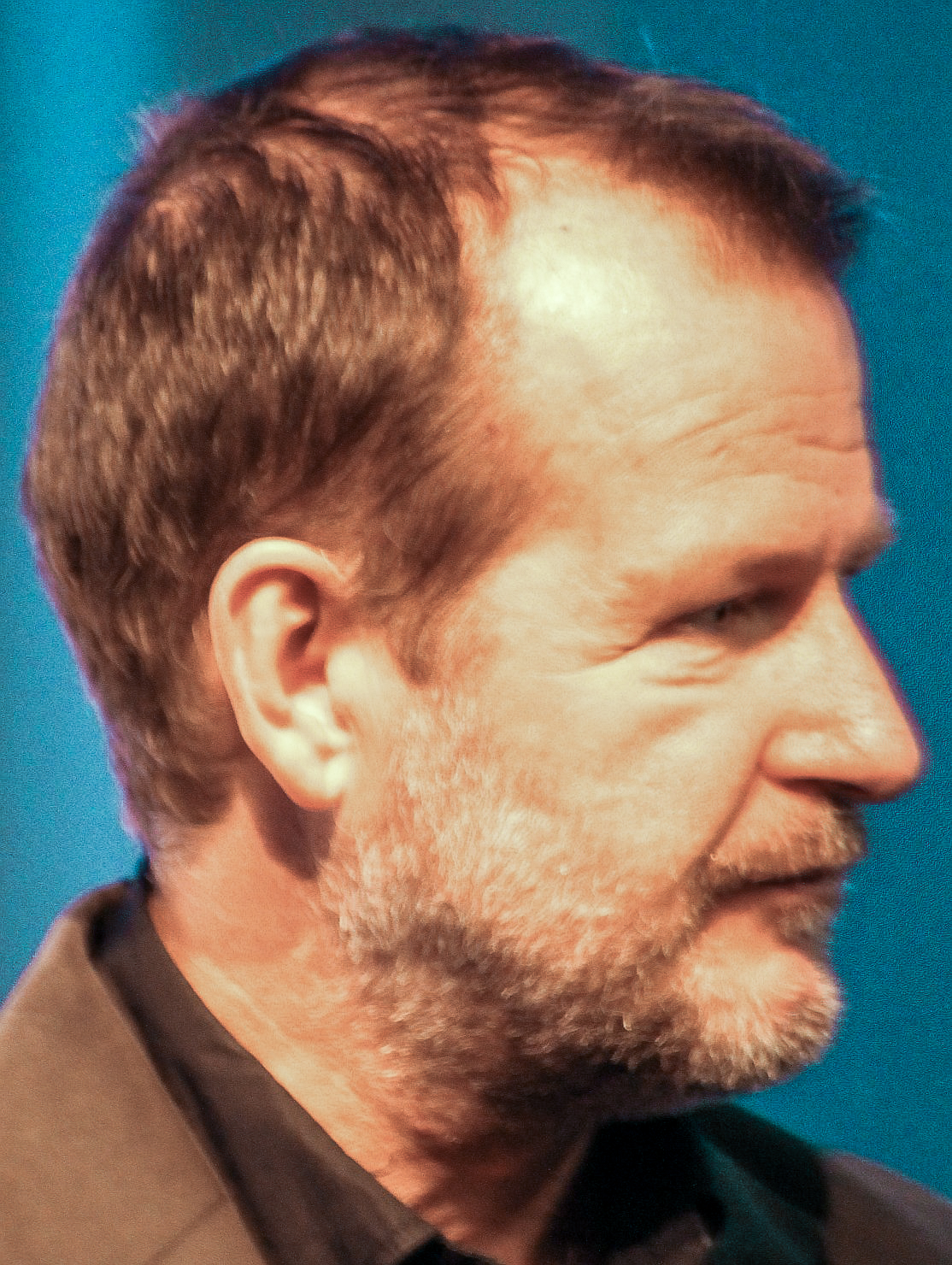
- Born: Björn Lennart Runge; 21 June 1961 (age 63); Lysekil, Sweden
- Occupation(s): Director, author
- Years active: 1984–present
- Notable work: Daybreak (2003); The Wife (2017)

Björn Lennart Runge is a Swedish director and author. He was nominated for The Nordic Council Film Prize in 2006 for Mun mot mun.

== Early life ==
Runge was born in Lysekil. He has worked in film since he was 20 and with Roy Andersson, amongst others. He graduated from the Dramatiska Institutet in Stockholm in 1989.

== Career ==
In 1991, he worked on the prizewinning short film Greger Olsson köper en bil, and in 2004, he won a Guldbagge Award for the best directing and script for the film Om jag vänder mig om. The film also won a Blue Angel at the Berlin Film Festival in the same year.

In 2006, he was nominated for The Nordic Council Film Prize for Mun mot mun with the producer Clas Gunnarson. The film deals with a family in crisis when their daughter, Vera, comes home with Morgan, an old criminal. Her father, Mats, fights desperately to win his daughter back.

Runge has directed a number of short films and TV productions.

In 2017, Runge directed the drama film, The Wife starring Glenn Close, Jonathan Pryce, Christian Slater, Annie Starke and Max Irons. For this role, Close won a Golden Globe, a SAG Award, and the Santa Barbara Int Film festival award for Best Leading Actress in 2018, among others.

In June 2019, Runge was awarded H.M the King's Medal 8th size for "significant contributions as a director and dramatist".

In 2022, he directed the drama film Burn All My Letters.

== Filmography ==
- Festen, co-directed Lena Koppel 1984
- Skymningsjägare 1985
- Steward Gustafssons julafton 1985
- Brasiliens röda kaffebär 1986
- Intill den nya världens kust 1987
- Maskinen 1988
- Mördaren 1989
- Vinden 1989
- Vart skall jag fly för ditt ansikte, co-director Jimmy Karlsson 1989
- Morgonen 1990
- Greger Olsson köper en bil 1990
- Ögonblickets barn 1991
- En dag på stranden 1994
- Sverige in Memorian, co-director Lena Dahlberg 1994
- Harry & Sonja 1996
- Vulkanmannen 1997
- Raymond 1999
- Anderssons älskarinna (TV series) 2001
- Om jag vänder mig om (Daybreak) 2003
- Mun mot mun 2005
- Happy End 2011
- The Wife 2017
- Burn All My Letters 2022
