= My Girl (2020 TV series) =

Chinese web television series

- Traditional Chinese: 99分女朋友
- Genre: Romantic drama Comedy film
- Created by: Nan Zhen
- Written by: Nan Zhen
- Directed by: Zhong Qing
- Starring: Li Jia Qi; Zhao Yi Qin
- Opening theme: Imperfect, so what? by Huang Yali
- Ending theme: Pole Star by Chen Xueran
- Country of origin: China
- Original language: Mandarin
- No. of seasons: 1
- No. of episodes: 24

Production
- Production location: Mainland China
- Running time: 45 minutes

Original release
- Network: Youku
- Release: June 17 – July 23, 2020

My Girl (Chinese: 99分女朋友) is a 2020 Chinese streaming television series starring Li Jia Qi and Zhao Yiqin, and tells the story of a makeup artist, who has dissociative identity disorder and a stingy CEO of a cosmetic company.

== Synopsis ==
When Meng Hui was a child, she was accidentally injured by Shen Yi, leaving a big scar on her face and causing her dissociative identity disorder. Shen Yi escaped responsibility because of his young age, but both of them grew up with their own respective "scars." One day, they came across each other again when Meng Hui, now a makeup artist, meets Shen Yi, now CEO of the cosmetics company LS.

== Cast ==
=== Main cast ===
Actor	Character Name	Description
Zhao Yiqin	Shen Yi	Shen Yi is the main CEO of LS Cosmetics, and they call him "the most stingy CEO in history." He originally went to school with Meng Hui during their elementary years. It was there that he accidentally left a large scar on her face. Years later, Shen Yi has set out to make it up to her by creating LS Cosmetics company to try and create a light-liquid foundation that will cover any scar as his apology for the accident.
Li Jiaqi	Meng Hui	Meng Hui is a girl with PTSD, her condition has made her into a makeup artist who uses her skills to cover any imperfection for others via makeup. All because of an accident that happened in her youth.

=== Supporting cast ===
Actor	Character Name	Description
Fan Zhixin	Sui An	Sui An is a Plastic Surgeon, he meets Wei Lei after treating her nose after an injury, he soon becomes her boyfriend. He is Shen Yi's best friend also turning out to be the older boy (bully) from Shen Yi and Meng Hui's past.
He Mei Zuan	Wei Lei	Wei Lei is a model- and ex girlfriend of Shen Yi- Meng Hui was her makeup artist during a reality show. At first she disliked Meng Hui, but they went on to be bestfriends. She also has a large crush on Sui An after he treats her nose for an injury, they begin to date soon after.
Pu Tao	Ah Tao	Ah Tao is a psychiatrist, she treats Meng Hui for PTSD as well as Jiang Jiang. She is close friends with both, and even bonds with Wei Lei. In the end, Jiang Jiang professes his love and the two begin dating.
Arthur Su	Jiang Jiang	Jiang Jiang is CEO Shen Yi's assistant. Originally, Ah Tao tricked him into beginning treatment, they became friends, and started to fall for each other.
Cheng Mu Xuan	Xu Xing Yao	She started LS with Shen Yi years ago and has worked by his side since. Over the years she began to have feelings for Shen Yi, making her and Meng Hui enemies.
Tuo Chung Hua	Shen Qian Shan	He is Shen Yi's father, and he married Yao Xue Lan after his first wife- and Shen Yi's mother- died. He wants Shen Yi to love him, but he doesn't know how to be a father.
Yang Ming Na	Yao Xue Lan	She is Shen Qian Shan's second wife, and Shen Yi's stepmother. She has no children but wants a child to love like her own [Shen Yi and Meng Hui].

== Soundtrack ==
My Girl Original Soundtrack (OST)

Soundtrack album by Various artists
- Released: June 18, 2020
- Genre: Mandopop; Instrumental
- Language: Mandarin

No.	Title	Singer	Length
1.	"Imperfect, so what?" (不完美又怎样)	Huang Yali	3:55
2.	"Polar Star" (极星)	Chen Xueran (陈雪燃)	4:12
3.	"99 Point Girl" (99分女孩)	Stringer (弦子)	3:33
4.	"Turn it Around" (回旋时间)	Angela Hui (许靖韵)	3:10
5.	"Lets Talk About Love" (快谈恋爱)	Kym (金莎)	3:24

== Fun Facts ==
- This is the second time Zhao Yiqin and Li Jia Qi work as an onscreen couple, their first works is Wait, My Youth
- The writer Nan Zhen also write another popular drama The Romance of Tiger and Rose
