= Race the World =

Chinese television series

- Presented by: "Andy" Dong Anan (董安安)
- No. of contestants: 12
- Winners: Joe Cheng & Ariel Lin
- No. of legs: 12
- No. of episodes: 12

Release
- Original network: Jiangsu Television
- Original release: April 8 – July 8, 2016

Additional information
- Filming dates: March 4 – May 14, 2016

Race the World (Chinese: 非凡搭檔; pinyin: Fēifán Dādàng) is a Chinese reality television series that aired on Jiangsu Television in 2016 that features twelve contestants that formed teams of two in a race around the world to win a grand prize of ¥500,000 and a lifetime usage of an Infiniti Q50L.

Joe Cheng and Ariel Lin were the winners of Race the World.

== Production ==
=== Development and filming ===
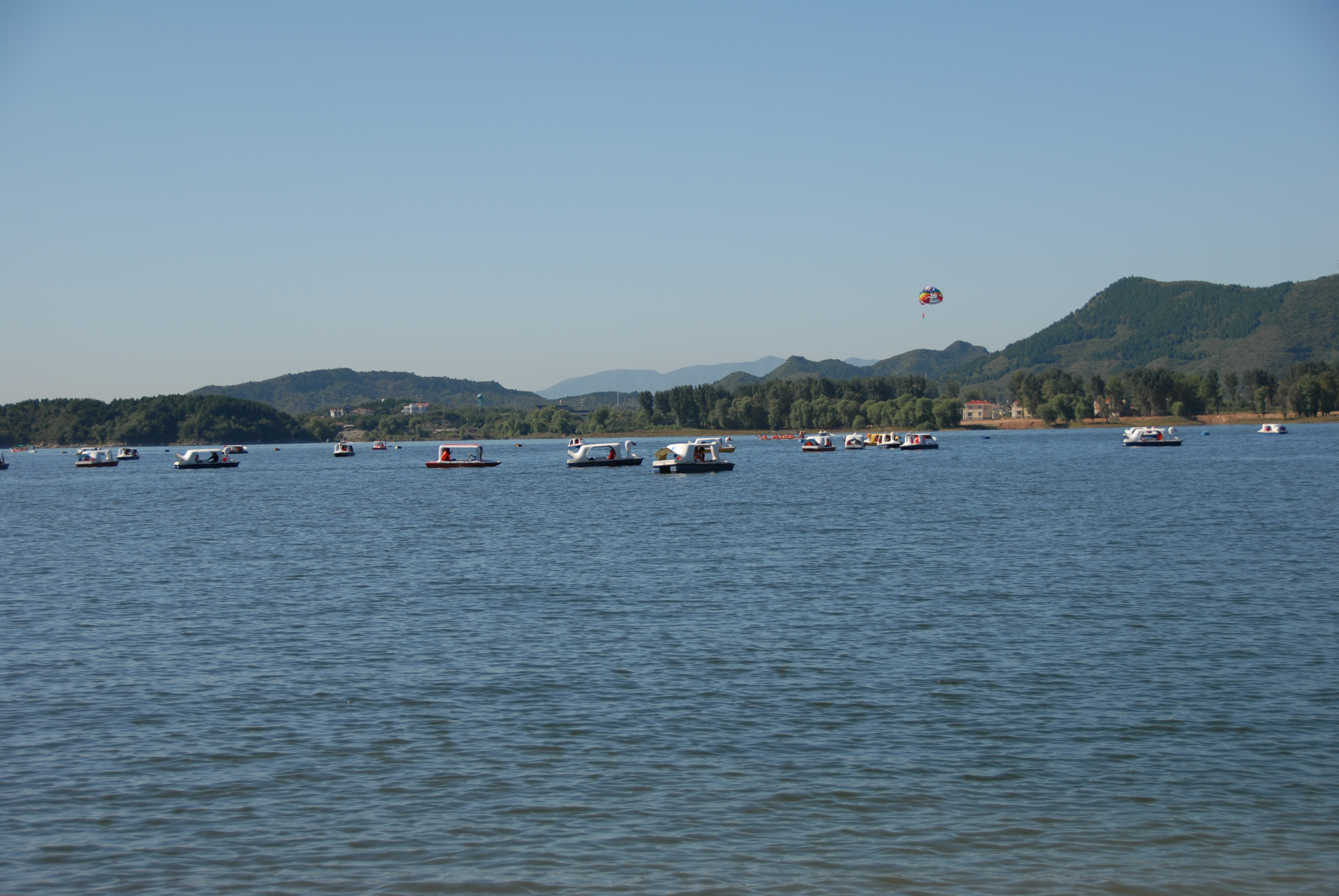
Beijing Yanqi Lake International Convention & Exhibition Center, where world leaders gathered for the APEC China 2014, on the banks of Yanqi Lake served as the Starting Line for Race the World.

Race the World drew on the format of the series The Amazing Race, with tasks and obstacles similar to Detours and Blind Detours, Yields, Intersections, and Head-to-Heads included in the show, and included themes of the Olympic Games to coincide with the 2016 Summer Olympics, airing the same year as The Amazing Race China 3 which had a similar theme. Like The Amazing Race, the show featured teams of two in a race around the world to win a grand prize. Teams had to complete various challenges to receive clues sealed in a relay race baton to reach an end point. Unlike The Amazing Race, the teams of two were shuffled every two legs with the goal of testing different partner dynamics during the run of the series with contestants choosing their partners much like The Amazing Race 29. Also, the team that completed all of the challenges in a leg and reached the final destination first would win 100 points. When subsequent teams reached the final destination, they would earn one less point for every two minutes they finished behind the lead team. After nine legs, the eight individuals with the most points would remain with the four individuals with the lowest scores eliminated. The teams would then reshuffle for the final time to complete the final legs.

On March 3, 2016, the cast and premise of the show were announced in a press conference. Filming for the series ended on May 14 in Nanjing. After filming ended, contestant Baron Chen was discovered traveling to Taiwan to receive medical treatment for a torn cruciate ligament. The following month, Chen's agent threatened a lawsuit with the show's production company over delayed insurance compensation.

After Leg 1 ended, Sheng Yilun discovered that he had lost his passport and was unable to compete in the United States legs. Harry Yuan was brought in as a substitute so all racers could compete with a partner but was not eligible for the grand prize.

=== Cast ===
The cast of Race the World consisted of Chinese celebrities including Taiwanese actor and model Baron Chen, Taiwanese model, actor and singer Joe Cheng, Taiwanese actress Evonne Hsieh, Hong Kong actor Leon Lai, Taiwanese actress and singer Ariel Lin, short track speed skater Wang Meng, actor Daddi Tang, pop singer and actor Vision Wei, gymnast Li Xiaopeng, professional pool player Pan Xiaoting, actor and model Sheng Yilun, and actress and singer Zhu Zhu.

Li Xiaopeng previously competed on the first season of The Amazing Race China with his wife Li Anqi in 2014. Zhu Zhu and Harry Yuan competed on separate teams on the second season in 2015. A year later, Joe Cheng and Evonne Hsieh competed on separate teams on The Amazing Race China 4.

=== Marketing ===
Infiniti, which previously served as a sponsor on the Chinese Amazing Race, served as the primary sponsor of Race the World and provided all of the cars during the legs.

== Results ==
Contestant		Leg 1	Leg 2	Leg 3	Leg 4	Leg 5	Leg 6	Leg 7	Leg 8 +	Leg 9	Leg 10	Leg 11	Leg 12	Legs 1-9 Total Scores	Legs 10-11 Total Scores
鄭元暢	Joe Cheng	83	89	78	100▷	97	93	65^	99−+	85^{6}	96	100	1st Place	789	196
林依晨	Ariel Lin	81	100	83	77	57	95>	65^	99−+	30^{5}^{,}^{6}	96	100	1st Place	687	196
朱珠	Zhu Zhu	74	88	59	67	100	95	91°	70+−	85^{6}	100	25^{8}	2nd Place	729	125
盛一倫	Sheng Yilun	73	46^{1}	50^{1}	79	76ↇↇ	90	46~	100+−	126^{4}	100	25^{8}	2nd Place	686	125
王濛	Wang Meng	73	81	68^{2}>	79	57	95>	100°	99−+^{3}	30^{5}^{,}^{6}	76	25^{8}	3rd Place	682	101
陳楚河	Baron Chen	74	88	59	67	87	91<	91°	70 +−	58^{6}	76	25^{8}	3rd Place	685	101
唐曉天	Daddi Tang	83	89	83	77	87	91<	61~	90+−	58^{6}	99	25^{8}	4th Place	719	124
潘曉婷	Pan Xiaoting	100	61	100	79	76ↇↇ	90	68^	88−−^{3}	13^{5}^{,}^{6}	99	25^{8}	4th Place	675	124
李小鵬	Li Xiaopeng	100	61	89 <	59	97ↇ	93	100°	99−+^{3}	28^{5}^{,}^{6}^{,}^{7}				726	
謝依霖	Evonne Hsieh	73	92	89 <	59	100ↇ	95	61~	90+−	13^{5}^{,}^{6}				672	
黎明	Leon Lai	73	81	78	100▷	45	100	46~	100+−	28^{5}^{,}^{6}				651	
魏晨	Vision Wei	81	100	68^{2}>	79	45	100	68^	88−−^{3}					629	

- A red score indicates that the contestant was eliminated after failing to obtain enough points to move onto the final legs..
- A maroon score means the contestant withdrew from the competition.
- Matching colored symbols (magenta °, brown ^, and olive ~) indicate teams who worked together during part of the leg.
- An orange + indicates teams had to compete against each other on this leg. A red +, blue +, green +, teal +, and black + indicates the team that received bonus points, while a red −, blue −, green −, olive −, and black − indicates the team that lost and received a 5-point deduction.
- A yellow < indicates the team who received a Brake Card and had to stop racing for twenty minutes. A > indicates that the team that used the Brake Card.
- A green ▷ means that a team used a Car Card and could travel in a car instead of a taxi for a leg.
- A purple ↇↇ means that the contestants were joined together with a Binding Card; ↇ indicates the contestants that used the Binding Card.
1. As Sheng Yilun could not compete in Legs 2 and 3, he received half of the points the person who would have been his partner earned.
2. Vision Wei & Wang Meng traveled in a private vehicle instead of a taxi during Leg 3 and were penalized 15 points.
3. Li Xiaopeng & Wang Meng earned 10 points during the Highland games task that was added to their score. Vision Wei & Pan Xiaoting lost two games and received a ten-point deduction from their score.
4. Vision Wei withdrew from the show after Leg 8 ended for personal reasons. As Sheng Yilun did not have a partner in Leg 9, his score at the end of the leg doubled.
5. Li Xiaopeng & Leon Lai, Pan Xiaoting & Evonne Hsieh, and Ariel Lin & Wang Meng failed to complete the bicycle task after eight attempts and were penalized 15 points.
6. Several teams received five point penalties for each duck they lost during the duck herding task. Li Xiaopeng & Leon Lai lost 4 ducks. Joe Cheng & Zhu Zhu lost 3 ducks. Daddi Tang & Baron Chen lost 3 ducks. Pan Xiaoting & Evonne Hsieh lost 2 ducks. Ariel Lin & Wang Meng lost 3 ducks.
7. Li Xiaopeng announced to the contestants after Leg 9 concluded that he would be withdrawing from the show as his wife Li Anqi was about to give birth to their second child. As Vision Wei also withdrew from the show, the two contestants with the lowest scores were eliminated.
8. Baron Chen & Wang Meng and Daddi Tang & Pan Xiaoting elected to quit the final task of Leg 11 and had to wait out a two-hour penalty before they could continue racing. While attempting the task, Zhu Zhu had a bad fall and injured her right foot leading to her needing medical treatment. As Sheng Yilun could not complete the task without his partner, he had to wait out a two-hour penalty as well before he could continue racing.

=== Pairings ===
Leg 1	Li Xiaopeng & Pan Xiaoting	Joe Cheng & Daddi Tang	Vision Wei & Ariel Lin	Leon Lai & Wang Meng	Evonne Hsieh & Sheng Yilun	Baron Chen & Zhu Zhu
Leg 2	Li Xiaopeng & Pan Xiaoting	Joe Cheng & Daddi Tang	Vision Wei & Ariel Lin	Leon Lai & Wang Meng	Evonne Hsieh & Harry Yuan	Baron Chen & Zhu Zhu
Leg 3	Li Xiaopeng & Evonne Hsieh	Joe Cheng & Leon Lai	Daddi Tang & Ariel Lin	Vision Wei & Wang Meng	Pan Xiaoting & Harry Yuan	Baron Chen & Zhu Zhu
Leg 4	Li Xiaopeng & Evonne Hsieh	Joe Cheng & Leon Lai	Daddi Tang & Ariel Lin	Vision Wei & Wang Meng	Pan Xiaoting & Sheng Yilun	Baron Chen & Zhu Zhu
Leg 5	Li Xiaopeng & Joe Cheng	Pan Xiaoting & Sheng Yilun	Daddi Tang & Baron Chen	Vision Wei & Leon Lai	Ariel Lin & Wang Meng	Evonne Hsieh & Zhu Zhu
Leg 6	Li Xiaopeng & Joe Cheng	Pan Xiaoting & Sheng Yilun	Daddi Tang & Baron Chen	Vision Wei & Leon Lai	Ariel Lin & Wang Meng	Evonne Hsieh & Zhu Zhu
Leg 7	Li Xiaopeng & Wang Meng	Joe Cheng & Ariel Lin	Daddi Tang & Evonne Hsieh	Vision Wei & Pan Xiaoting	Leon Lai & Sheng Yilun	Baron Chen & Zhu Zhu
Leg 8	Li Xiaopeng & Wang Meng	Joe Cheng & Ariel Lin	Daddi Tang & Evonne Hsieh	Vision Wei & Pan Xiaoting	Leon Lai & Sheng Yilun	Baron Chen & Zhu Zhu
Leg 9	Li Xiaopeng & Leon Lai	Joe Cheng & Zhu Zhu	Daddi Tang & Baron Chen	Pan Xiaoting & Evonne Hsieh	Ariel Lin & Wang Meng	Sheng Yilun
Leg 10	Joe Cheng & Ariel Lin	Zhu Zhu & Sheng Yilun	Daddi Tang & Pan Xiaoting	Baron Chen & Wang Meng		
Leg 11	Joe Cheng & Ariel Lin	Zhu Zhu & Sheng Yilun	Daddi Tang & Pan Xiaoting	Baron Chen & Wang Meng		
Leg 12	Joe Cheng & Ariel Lin	Zhu Zhu & Sheng Yilun	Daddi Tang & Pan Xiaoting	Baron Chen & Wang Meng		

== Race summary ==
=== Leg 1 (China) ===
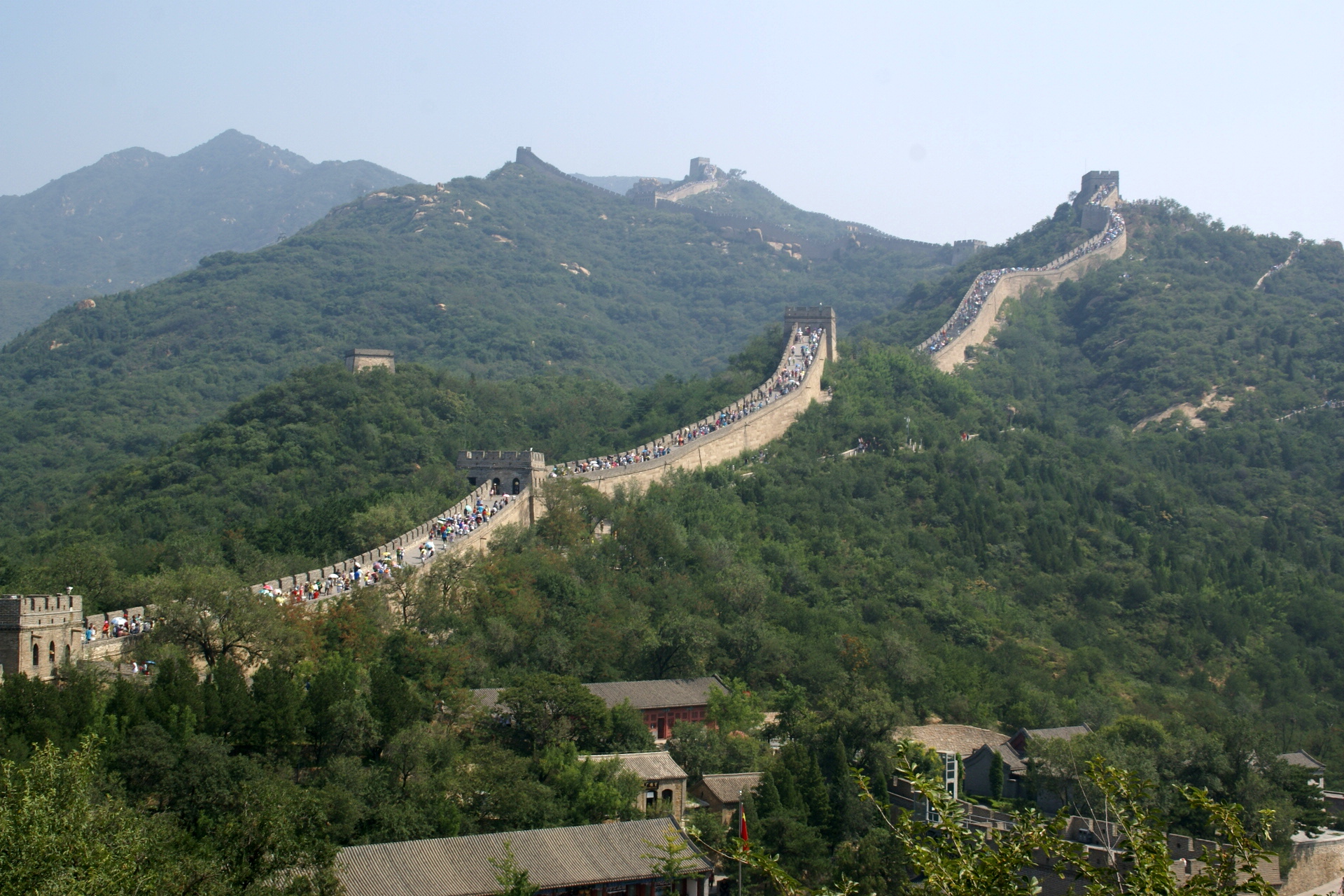
For the first leg, teams traveled to the Great Wall of China at Badaling to complete a martial arts challenge.

Airdate: April 8, 2016

- Beijing, China (Beijing Yanqi Lake International Convention & Exhibition Center) (Starting Line)
- Beijing (Great Wall of China – Badaling)
- Beijing (Olympic Sports Centre)
- Beijing (Air China Ticket Office) Finish Line

Tasks

- At Beijing Yanqi Lake International Convention & Exhibition Center, contestants had to randomly choose a baton with colored paper inside. The contestants with matching paper would be paired up, have their hands tied, and had to complete two track and field and two gymnastics challenges. After walking over a balance beam, jumping over three hurdles, tumbling across a mat, and jumping rope ten times with a third person, teams would receive their first clue.
- At the Badaling section of the Great Wall of China, each team member had to complete one of four martial arts tasks to receive their next clue: breaking 17 boards with one punch, cracking an egg with a whip, blowing out ten candles at once with one swing of nunchucks, and cutting an 88 grams (3.1 oz) slice of bread using a sword with team members eating any incorrectly cut bread After three attempts, teams had to enter another station or wait for another turn.
- At the Olympic Sports Centre, one team member had to pull their partner into the air using a pulley system. The team member in the air had to toss colored rings onto pylons to form the Olympic rings and receive their next clue.

=== Leg 2 (China → United States) ===
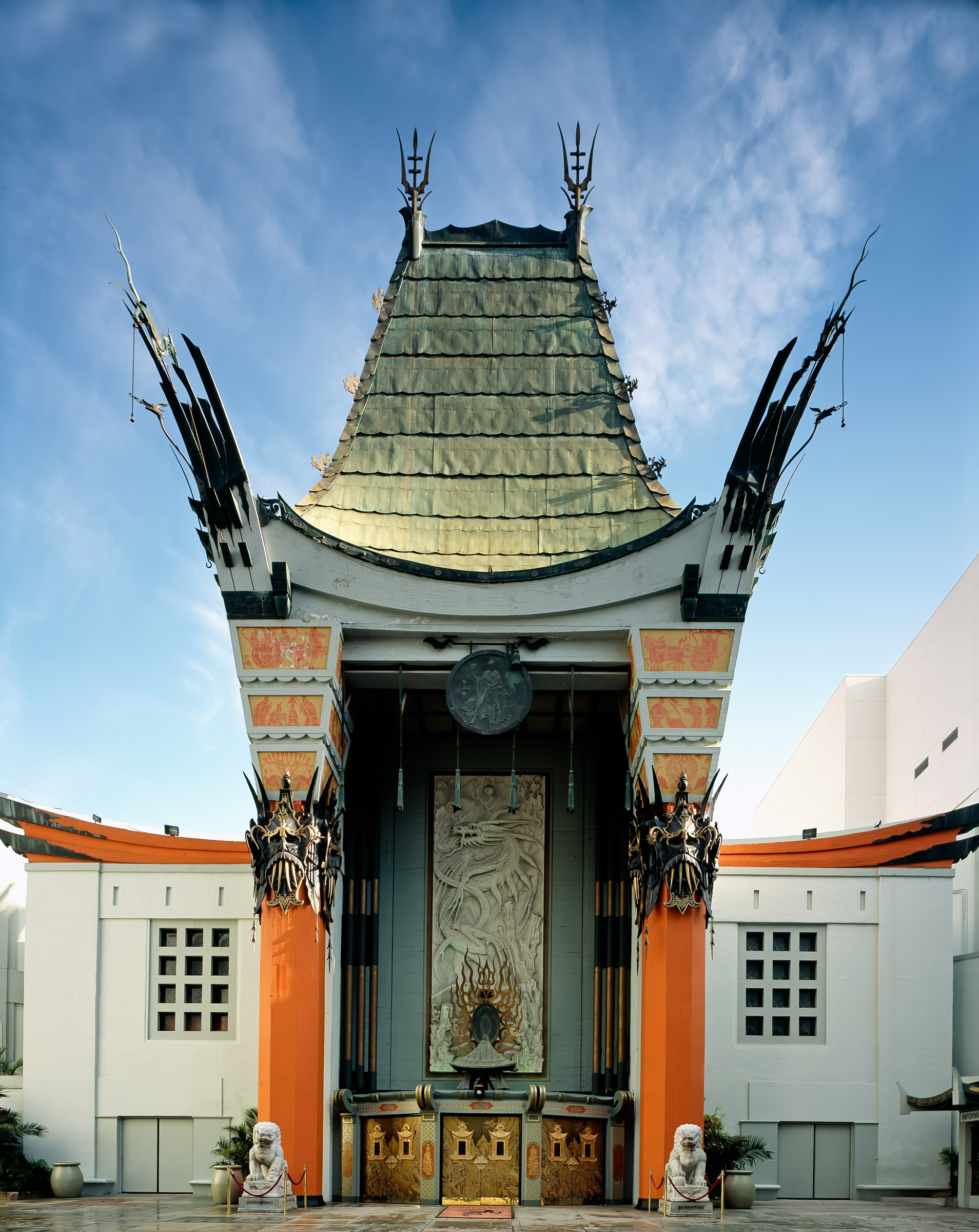
Outside the Grauman's Chinese Theatre in Los Angeles, teams had to mimic famous Hollywood celebrities.

Airdate: April 15, 2016

- Beijing (Beijing Capital International Airport) to Los Angeles, California, United States (Los Angeles International Airport)
- Los Angeles (Athena Parking) (Starting Line)
- Los Angeles (Grauman's Chinese Theatre)
- Newhall (Oak Tree Gun Club) or Los Angeles (University of Southern California – Uytengsu Aquatics Center)
- Los Angeles (Los Angeles Memorial Coliseum) Finish Line

Tasks

- At Athena Parking, teams would be placed on a platform suspended 30 metres (98 ft) in the air and had three minutes to collect 18 flags. If the platform tipped and teams fell off, the flags teams were holding would be counted, and teams would be given their next clue in the order of who collected the most flags in the fastest time.
- Outside the Grauman's Chinese Theatre, teams would find celebrity impersonators, who would give them a list of five famous celebrities that they had to imitate to a tourist without describing them. Once their tourist correctly guessed all five within one minute, teams could blindly select their next task by choosing one of two buckets, each with three clues, that only listed the names of the tasks: 射击 (Shèjí – Shooting) or 跳水 (Tiàoshuǐ – Diving).
  - In Shooting, teams had to use a handgun to shoot a bullseye on a target, a tomato, and a bottle opener to open a bottle to receive their next clue. Only one team could shoot at a time and had to relinquish their spot after ten shots.
  - In Diving, team members had to swing off of a platform and drop into a pool to score points. When teams earned a combined score of at least 10 points, they would receive their next clue.

=== Leg 3 (United States) ===
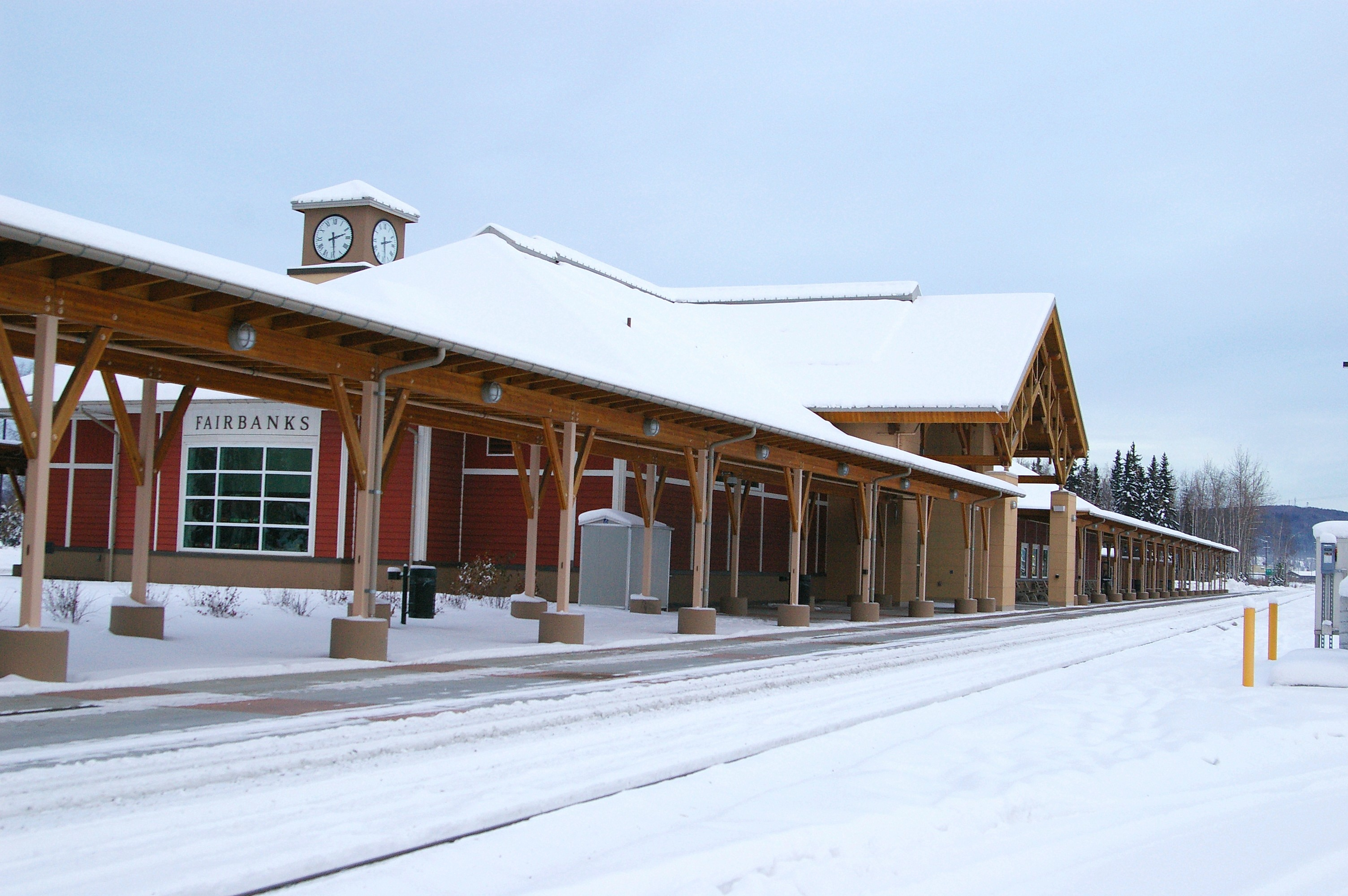
The frigid city of Fairbanks in Alaska hosted the third leg.

Airdate: April 22, 2016

- Los Angeles (Los Angeles International Airport) to Fairbanks, Alaska (Fairbanks International Airport)
- Fairbanks (Ballaine Road) (Starting Line)
- Fairbanks (West Valley High School)
- Fairbanks (Tanana Lakes Recreation Area)
- Fairbanks (George Horner Ice Park)
- Fairbanks (Anschen Log House) Finish Line

Tasks

- At the start of the leg, contestants would be asked questions about each other, and the contestant in the majority most often would have the first choice in choosing a partner. The people with the next highest correct answers would then choose until all the teams were formed.
- On Ballaine Road, teams would find a field of thirty ice blocks, each with batons inside but only some of which contained their next clue. Teams had to use a pick to break open blocks of ice until they found their next clue.
- At West Valley High School, teams would be presented with five Alaska Native games and had to complete three to receive their next clue. The games included holding a plank position while being carried, the caribou fight, where team members had to avoid being pushed out of a ring for thirty seconds, leg wrestling, where much like arm wrestling team members had to use their leg to pull down their opponent's leg, pulling a looped string off of an opponent's ear using ones ear, and kicking a ball in the air (150 centimetres (59 in) for males and 130 centimetres (51 in) for females) from a sitting position. The first three teams to finish could also retrieve one of three golden batons with an advantage. The 制动卡 (Zhì dòng kǎ – Brake Card) could be used to stop a team from racing for twenty minutes. The 专车卡 (Zhuānchē kǎ – Car Card) would give a team a car to use for a leg instead of a taxi. The 绑定卡 (Bǎng dìng kǎ – Binding Card) could be used to force two contestants together as a team.
- At the Tanana Lakes Recreation Area, one team member would be driven in an Infiniti Q50 on an icy field past signs that listed items associated with Alaska, like polar bears, snowmen, snowflakes, reindeer, Ursa Major, and Aurora Borealis. After their ride, they would have three minutes to draw the items listed on the signs without talking and for their partner to guess them three of them to receive their next clue.
- At George Horner Ice Park, teams had to play a life-size game of curling with one team member pushing their partner across a sheet of ice and onto a target to receive their next clue.

=== Leg 4 (United States → Japan) ===
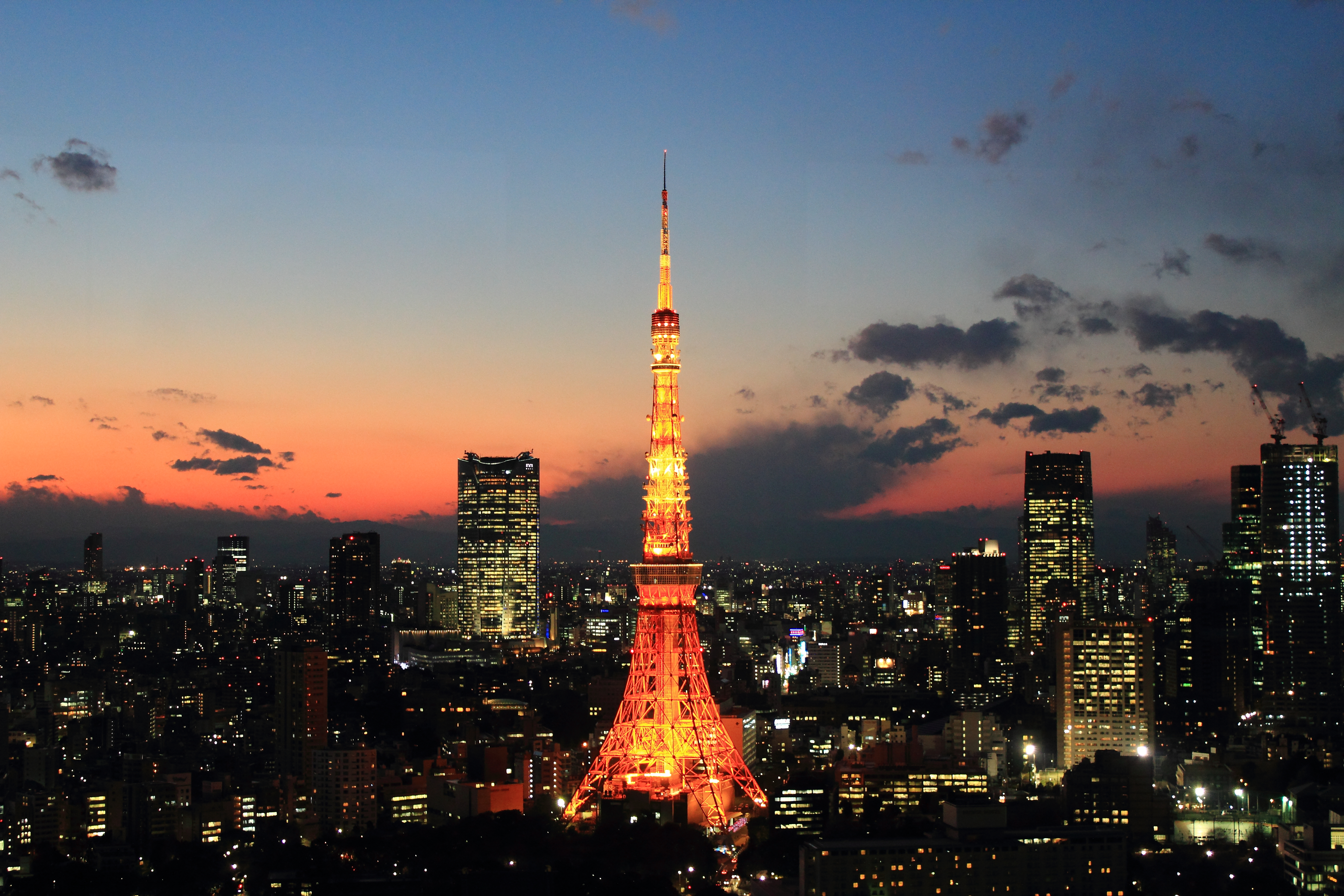
After arriving in Japan, teams made their way to Tokyo Tower to begin Leg 4.

Airdate: April 29, 2016

- Fairbanks (Fairbanks International Airport) to Tokyo, Japan (Narita International Airport)
- Tokyo (Minato – Tokyo Tower)
- Tokyo (Chiyoda – Don Quijote Akihabara and Kōtō – SIM Studio) or Tokyo (Shinjuku – Sushi Kokoro) and Kawasaki (Fujimi Park)
- Yokohama (Yokohama Country & Athletic Club)
- Tokyo (Shibuya – Shibuya 109) Finish Line

Tasks

- For finishing the previous leg in last place, Baron Chen and Zhu Zhu had to spend the night before the leg began at a capsule hotel instead of the hotel with the rest of the teams.
- At the base of Tokyo Tower, teams had to sort a bag of trash into the appropriate bins. Once complete, teams had to blindly select their next task by choosing one of three clues placed on figurines of anime characters or sumo wrestlers.
  - In 动漫 (Dòngmàn – Anime), teams had to find the cosplay pieces for a pair of well-known anime characters, Jimmy Kudo and Rachel Moore, Naruto Uzumaki and Kakashi Hatake, or Sailor Moon and Tuxedo Mask, and don the cosplay to receive their next clue, which instructed them to travel to SIM Studio. There, teams had to be photographed recreating two shown poses on a large mug to receive their next clue.
  - In 相扑 (Xiāng pū – Sumo), teams had to eat Japanese noodles until they gained a combined weight of at least 1 kilogram (2.2 lb) to receive their next clue, which instructed them to travel to Fujimi Park and find a dohyō surrounded by sumo wrestlers. At set intervals, one sumo wrestler would be told to briefly stand aside to allow teams into the circle. Once both team members entered the circle, they would receive their next clue and had to perform the task again to exit the circle.
- At Yokohama Country & Athletic Club, teams had to partake in a seventeen-legged race by running in sync with fourteen locals across the field in a time between 15 and 16 seconds to receive their next clue.

=== Leg 5 (Japan) ===
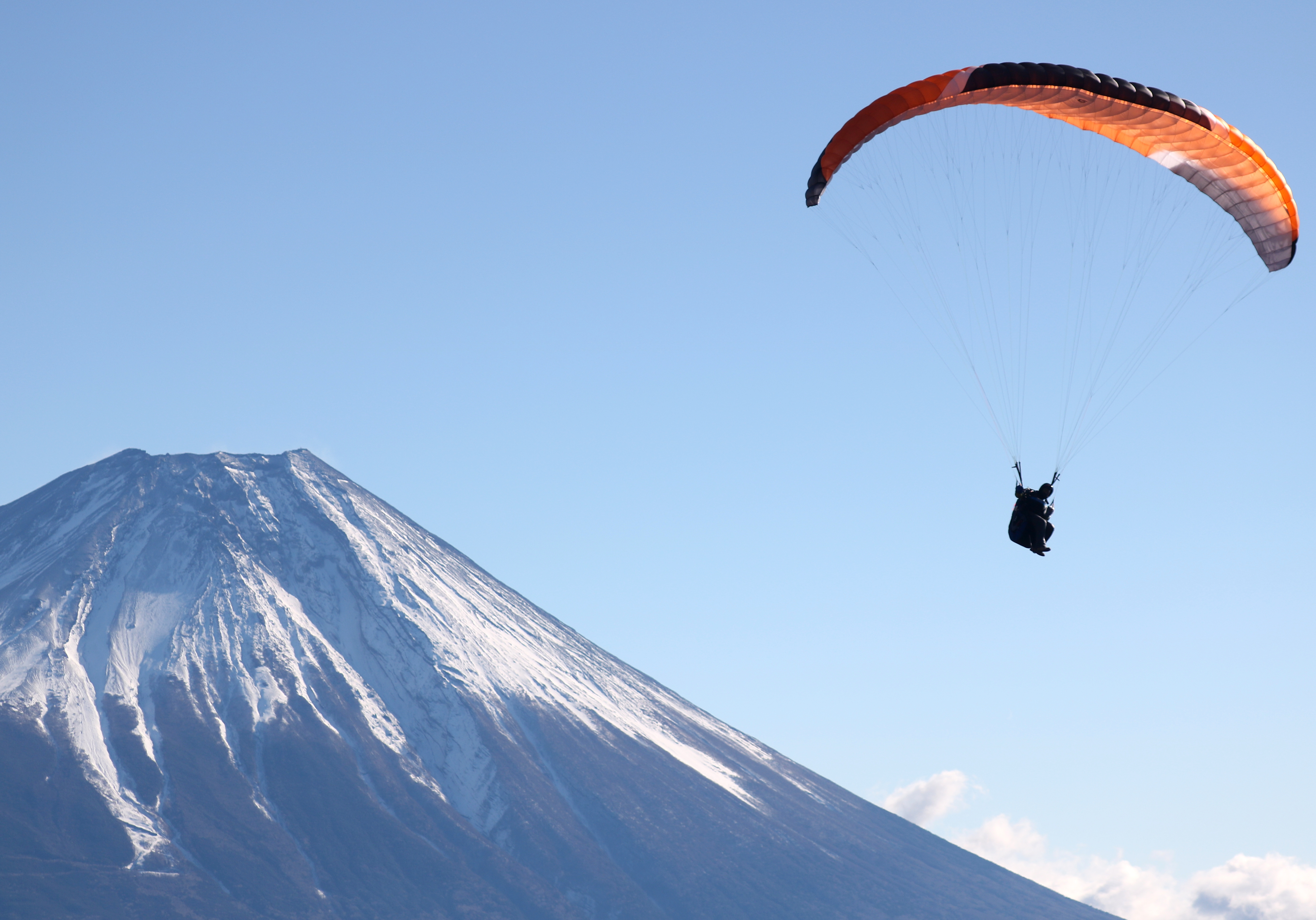
In the Shizuoka Prefecture, one team member had to go paragliding while their partner completed a sliding puzzle of Mount Fuji.

Airdate: May 6, 2016

- Fujikawaguchiko (Shoji Mount Hotel) (Starting Line)
- Fujinomiya (Asagiri Plateau Paragliding School)
- Fujikawaguchiko (Aokigahara Forest)
- Fujinomiya (Fumotoppara Campground) Finish Line

Tasks

- At the start of the leg, the six contestants with the lowest scores sat behind desks. Then, starting with the sixth place contestant, the remaining six contestants would choose their partner with the higher placing contestants having the ability to bump a person who already chose a partner. Once the teams were formed, they would receive their next clue.
- At Asagiri Plateau Paragliding School, one team member would be taken up Mount Kenashi and would paraglide off of the mountain. Once their partner was in the air, the team member on the ground could begin a sliding puzzle of Mount Fuji. Once they completed the puzzle, the paragliding team member would give them the final piece to complete the image and receive their next clue.
- In a clearing within the Aokigahara Forest, teams would find a Japanese festival and had to select a festival attendee with a koinobori, who would take them to a game that they had to complete to receive their next clue. The games included slurping Japanese noodles at a sound of at least 105 decibels, pounding a batch of Japanese rice with a large wooden mallet to create a paste at least 30 centimetres (12 in) long that lasted three seconds, pulling a suction cup off an opponent's head twice using team member's own head, goldfish scooping, where they had to use 4 pith paper paddles to scoop up 10 goldfish, each team member eating a bowl of wasabi-flavored ice cream, or using a fan to knock a small geisha headpiece off of a block of wood with the fan landing on the block.
- At Fumotoppara Campground, teams faced a choice of tasks between 剑道 (Jiàndào – Kendo) or 柔道 (Róudào – Judo). In Kendo, teams had to learn basic kendo swings, so they could use a shinai to pop one of three balloons on an opponent to receive their next clue.. In Judo, each team member had to learn a judo maneuver that one team member had to successfully execute against an opponent in twenty seconds to receive their next clue.

=== Leg 6 (Japan → China) ===
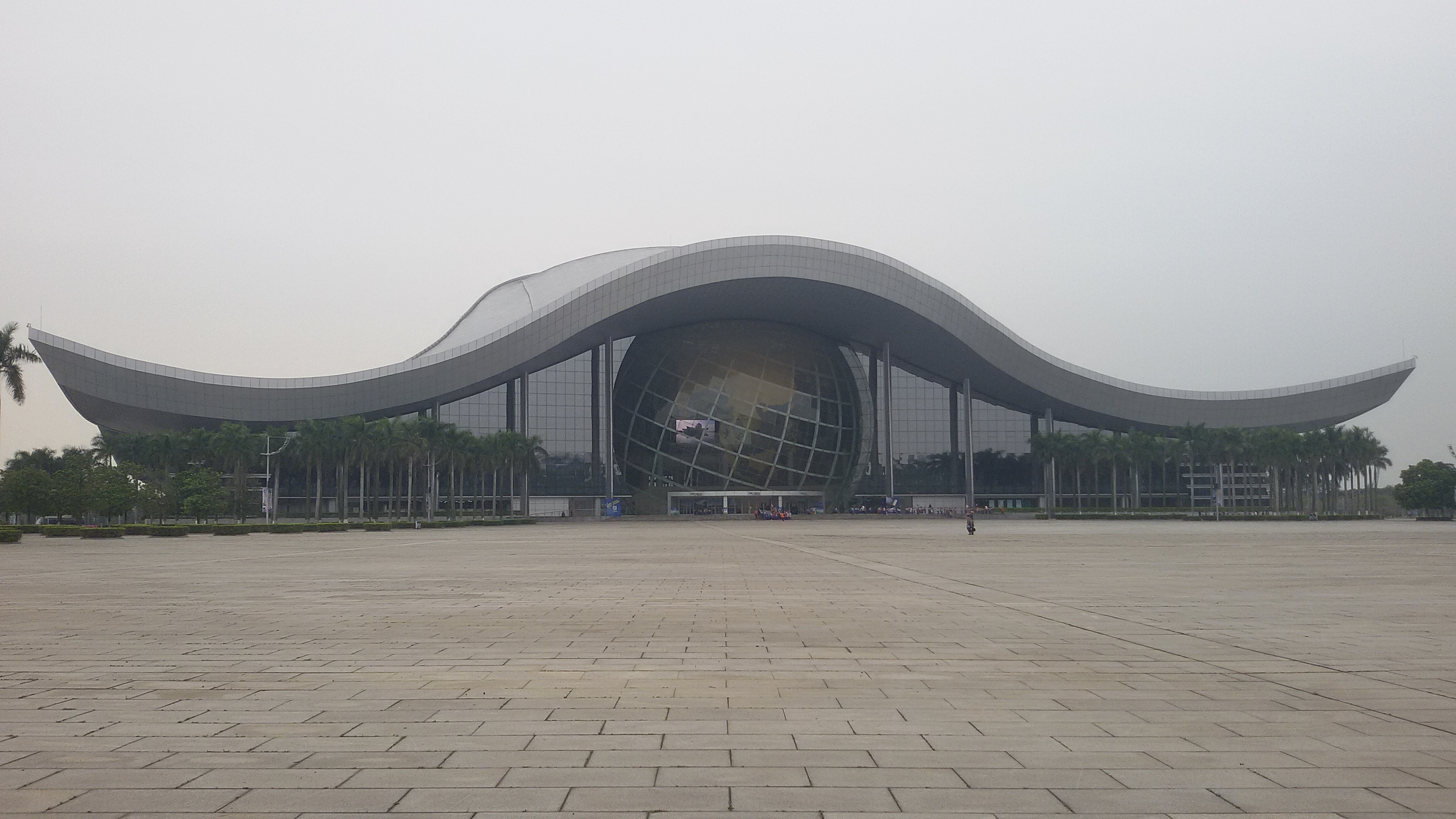
At Guangdong Science Center, teams had to play either on a life-size pool table or on a basketball race course.

Airdate: May 13, 2016

- Tokyo (Narita International Airport) to Guangzhou, Guangdong, China (Guangzhou Baiyun International Airport)
- Guangzhou (Lingnan Impression Park (in Chinese)) (Starting Line)
- Guangzhou (Guangdong Science Center)
- Guangzhou (Teem Tower – Nuoyuan Capital)
- Guangzhou (Canton Tower) Finish Line

Tasks

- As punishment for finishing the previous leg in last place, Vision Wei and Leon Lai had to serve dinner to the other teams before the leg began.
- At Guangzhou Academy of Fine Arts, teams were tied together and had to don a lion dance costume while a drum was being played to obtain their next clue. Like red light, green light, when the drumming stopped, teams had to freeze otherwise they had to return to the start. The first team to reach the drummer could grab a golden baton, which contained a Brake Card that could be used to force one team to stop racing for twenty-minutes.
- At Guangdong Science Center, teams had an option of two tasks, each with three stations. In one task, teams had to play life-size pool by kicking a soccer ball at a rack of large billiard balls and sink three balls to receive their next clue. If teams kicked a ball off of the table, they would have to restart the task. In the other task, team members had to hit a button to start a one-minute timer before driving an Infiniti Q70L to a basketball hoop, where they had to shoot five basketballs into the hoop and receive their next clue. They also had to drive back through a slalom course to hit the button to reset the timer. If the time expired, teams would have to restart the task.
- At Teem Tower, teams had two minutes to make three office workers laugh to receive their next clue.
- At Canton Tower, teams had to choose one of six tasks to perform while riding the Sky Drop, a drop tower and the highest roller coaster in the world, to receive their next clue. The tasks were screaming at 125 decibels, holding pieces of paper with their feet, holding glasses of water and retaining at least 250 milliliters, holding crackers in their mouths without biting or dropping them, balancing straws on top of their lips, and holding rolled up paper between their heads.

=== Leg 7 (China → United Kngdom) ===
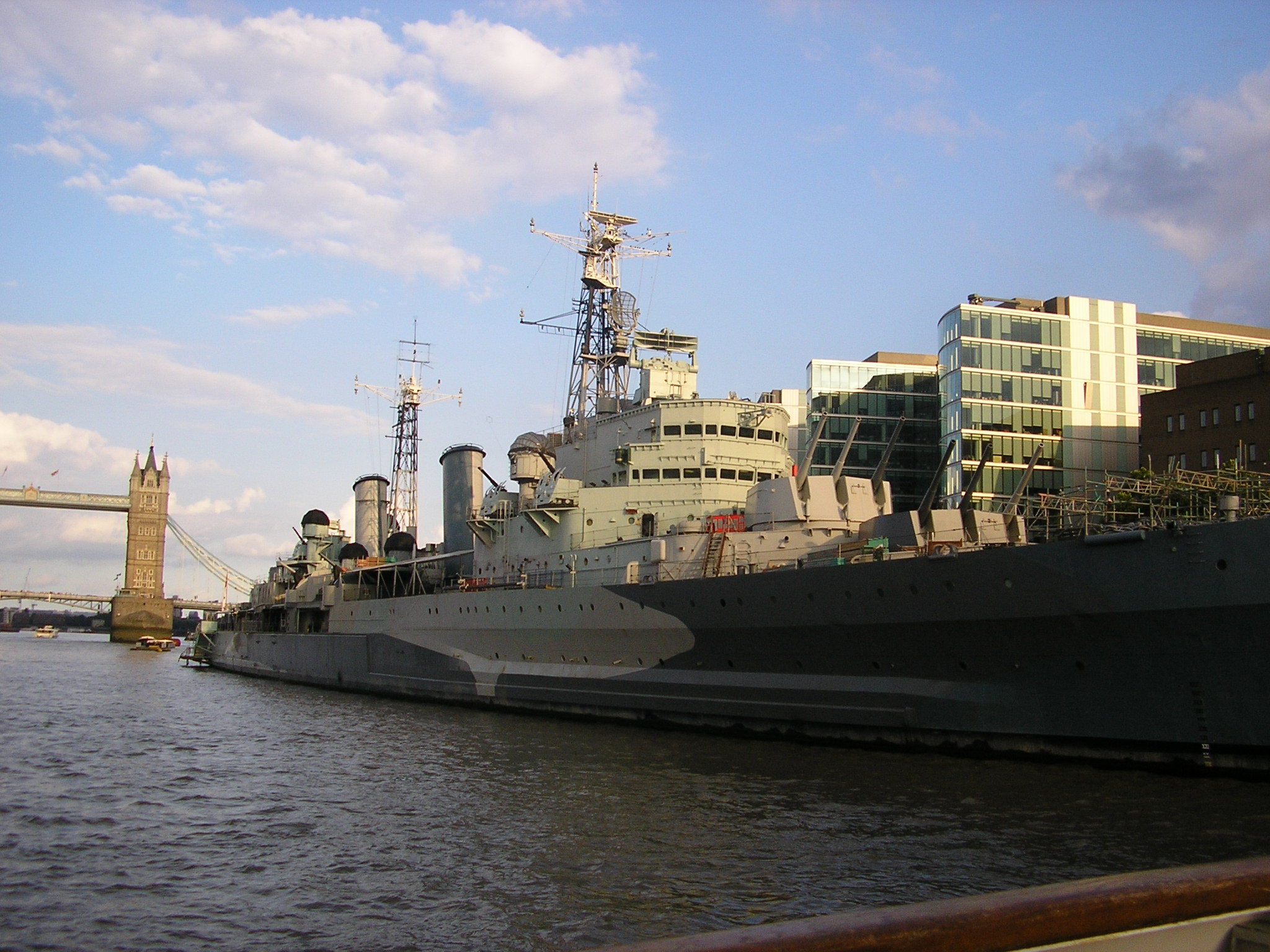
Following a task of rowing on the River Thames, teams traveled along the river to finish the leg on HMS Belfast.

Airdate: May 20, 2016

- Guangzhou (Guangzhou Baiyun International Airport) to London, England, United Kingdom (Heathrow Airport)
- London (Merchant Taylors' Hall) (Starting Line)
- London (Finsbury Circus)
- Upminster (Damyns Hall Aerodrome)
- London (Russell Square)
- London (Russell Square Tube Station to Vauxhall Tube Station)
- London (Brunswick House)
- London (London Rowing Club)
- London (River Thames – HMS Belfast) Finish Line

Tasks

- At the start of the leg in Merchant Taylors' Hall, one contestant would be randomly selected and would form all of the teams. After the teams were formed, they were given a map that directed them to Finsbury Circus to find their car before traveling to Damyns Hall Aerodrome.
- At Damyns Hall Aerodrome, two teams had to agree to join and work together to complete the task. Three team member then had to assemble a puzzle of a QR code. Once complete, their partner would fly by atop the wings of a biplane to photograph the QR code. If the photograph could be scanned by a smartphone, teams would receive their next clue and were no longer joined together.
- At Russell Square, teams had to complete three activities to receive their next clue. In the hat throwing challenge, one team member had five attempts to toss a hat onto the head of their partner for at least three seconds to receive a deerstalker. In the bicycle teapot relay, both team members had to ride a bicycle with one team member attempting to pour tea into a teacup held by their partner. If teams had enough tea in the cup at the end of the course, they would receive a magnifying glass. In the ironing board surfing task, teams had to convince three locals to carry one team member, who had to balance an egg on a place, on an ironing board across a finish line within 20 seconds. If successful, they would receive a tobacco pipe.
- In the Brunswick House, teams had a choice between two Sherlock Holmes-style mysteries, with a maximum of three teams per mystery, that they had to solve to receive their next clue.
  - In 主人房 (Zhǔrén fáng – Master Room), teams had six minutes to discover the identify of the man in the master room by finding clues to figure out that he was a 31 year-old lawyer named Jamie Newton married to Elise whose favorite fruit is oranges and whose favorite sport is fishing.
  - In 女仆房 (Nǚpū fáng – Maid Room), teams had to find numbers to unlock a safe in the maid room. They would find a recording of the song "London Bridge Is Falling Down" that would lead them to a painting of Tower Bridge that had four images of a raptor, a lamp, a Merlot bottle, and a book of the back of the frame. Teams had to realize that there were 2 raptor statues, inside the lamp was the following equation: Huluwa+Beyond–TFBoys+The Beatles–Little Tiger=? (7+5–4+4–3=9), there was a number 6 next to the Merlot bottle, and inside the book was the following sequence: 321456987=5, 14789654=6, 369=1, 123654789=? (2 by drawing a line on the keypad). Once teams inputted the code of 2962, they could open the safe and retrieve an apple that they could exchange for their next clue.
- At the London Rowing Club, teams had to row a quad scull with two other rowers balancing the boat through a course on River Thames in under two minutes to receive their next clue.

=== Leg 8 (United Kingdom) ===
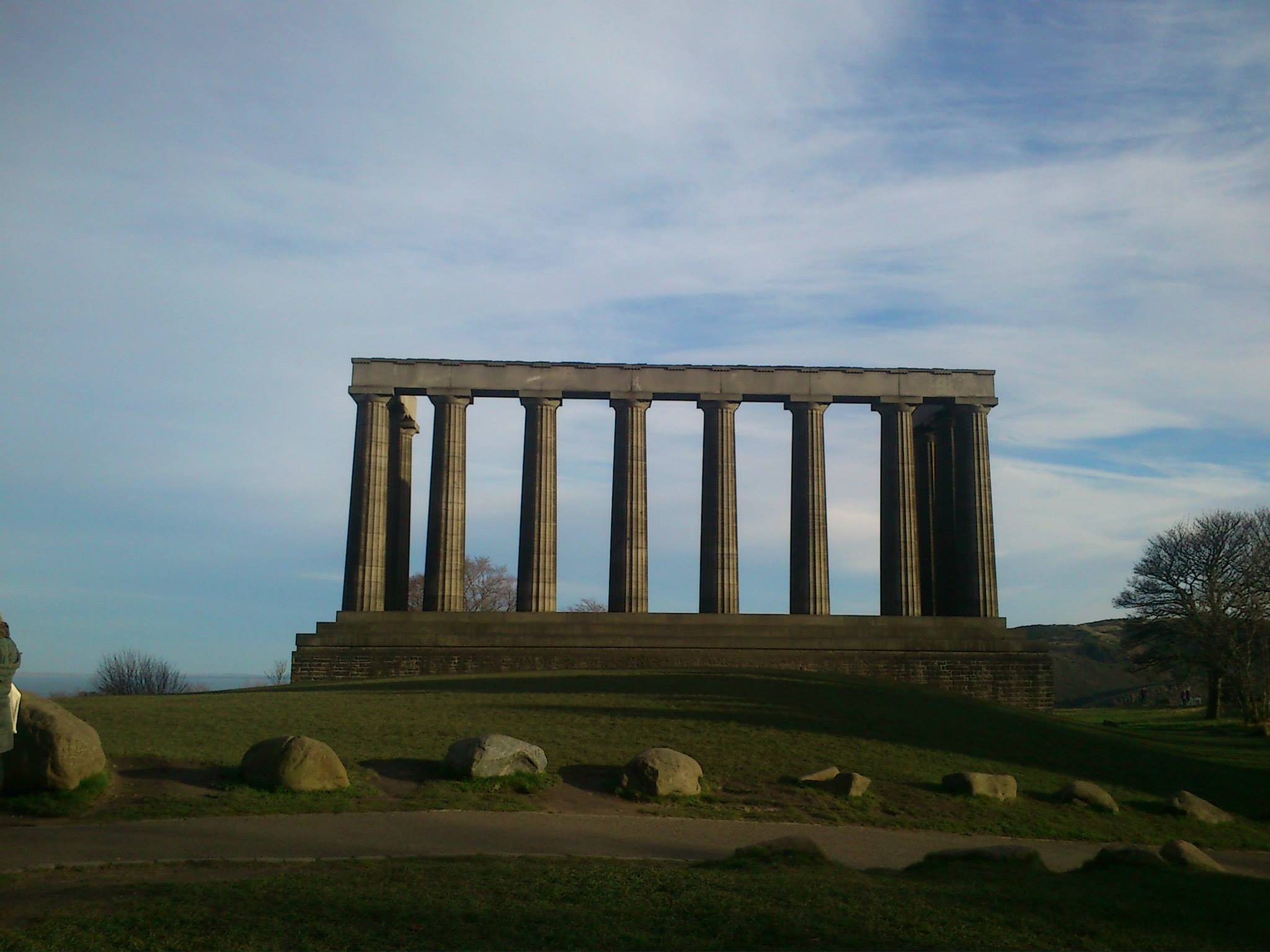
After climbing up Calton Hill, teams ended their eighth leg at the National Monument of Scotland overlooking Edinburgh.

Airdate: May 27, 2016

- London (Heathrow Airport) to Edinburgh, Scotland (Edinburgh Airport)
- South Queensferry (Dundas Castle) (Starting Line)
- Edinburgh (The Meadows or Rolling Haggis)
- Edinburgh (Royal Mile)
- Edinburgh (Calton Hill – National Monument of Scotland) Finish Line

Tasks

- At Dundas Castle, teams had start the leg by taking part in Highland games and choose one of three games to play by wagering five points. The first event was a caber toss with team that had the higher combined toss distance winning the game. If only one team was at the caber toss, they had to beat a distance of 20 metres (66 ft) to win. In the second game, teams had to run in a zigzag through fence while holding a log with the team that had the faster time winning the game. If only one teams was at the sack race, they had to beat a time of 18 seconds to win. The last game was a sack race with the first team to cross the finish line winning the game. If only one teams was at the sack race, they had to beat a time of 12 seconds to win. A team would earn five bonus points per each team they defeated that would be applied at the end of the leg, while the teams that lost would have five points deducted. After two rounds, teams would receive their next clue, which gave teams two tasks that they could freely switch between.
  - At The Meadows, teams had five minutes to push, but not pull, three Union Jack blocks through a maze and onto three yellow squares to receive their next clue.
  - At Rolling Haggis, teams had to select one of three categories of pictures, numbers, colors, or celebrities. They would then enter a Zorb and would be shown the pictures they selected for one minute before rolling down the hill. At the bottom of the hill, they had to correctly answer a randomly selected question about the pictures to receive their next clue.
- On the Royal Mile, teams had to complete one of three street activities to receive their next clue. They had to hold two two-person yoga poses for thirty seconds each, hold a column of ten can between their heads for fifteen seconds, or juggle two balls and a rubber chicken.

=== Leg 9 (United Kingdom → Netherlands) ===
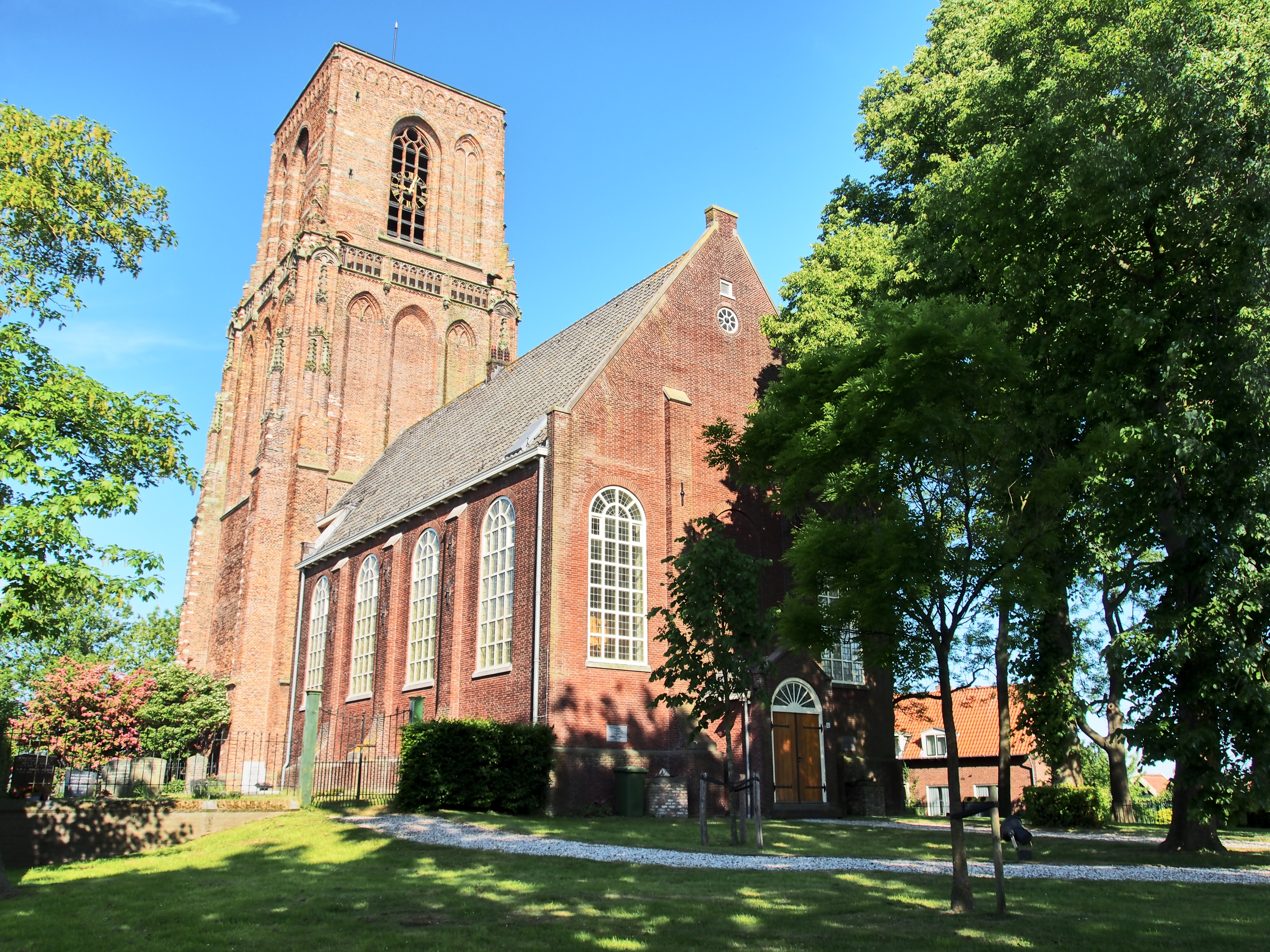
In the Dutch village of Ransdorp, teams had to herd geese.

Airdate: June 3 and 10, 2016

- Edinburgh (Edinburgh Airport) to Amsterdam, Netherlands (Amsterdam Airport Schiphol)
- Lisse (Keukenhof) (Starting Line)
- Amsterdam (NDSM)
- Amsterdam (NDSM to Amsterdam Centraal Station)
- Amsterdam (Melkmeisjesbrug to Museumplein)
- Ransdorp (Dorpsweg Ransdorp 102)
- Ransdorp (Kerk van Ransdorp (in Dutch))
- Amsterdam (Olympic Stadium) Finish Line

Tasks

- In the order from lowest score to highest score, contestants would choose their partners or the option to race alone for double the points. Once a contestant was chosen, they could not be stolen.
- At Keukenhof, teams had a choice between 木鞋 (Mù xié – Clogs) or 奶酪 (Nǎilào – Cheese). In Clogs, teams had three minutes to kick three clogs into three separate sections of the same colored blade of a wooden windmill to receive their next clue. In Cheese, teams had 160 seconds to transfer ten cheese orbs to a wooden stretcher using two sticks to receive their next clue.
- At NDSM, one team member had to ride a bicycle across a 30-centimetre (12 in) wide beam suspended in the air to receive a tag that matched one on a tandem bicycle, or a regular bicycle for Sheng Yilun, at Melkmeisjesbrug with their next clue that instructed teams to ride to Museumplein. Failure to complete the task after eight attempts would result in a 15-point deduction.
- On Museumplein, teams had to recreate the Vincent van Gogh Sunflowers painting by convincing seven other people to don plastic sunflowers on their heads and stand on a large pot within 60 seconds before having their picture taken to receive their next clue.
- In Ransdorp, teams had to use two flags to herd a flock of eight geese from a small pen into a larger pen on the other end of the village to receive their next clue. Teams would receive a five-point penalty for each goose they were unable to herd into the pen.

=== Leg 10 (Netherlands → Italy) ===
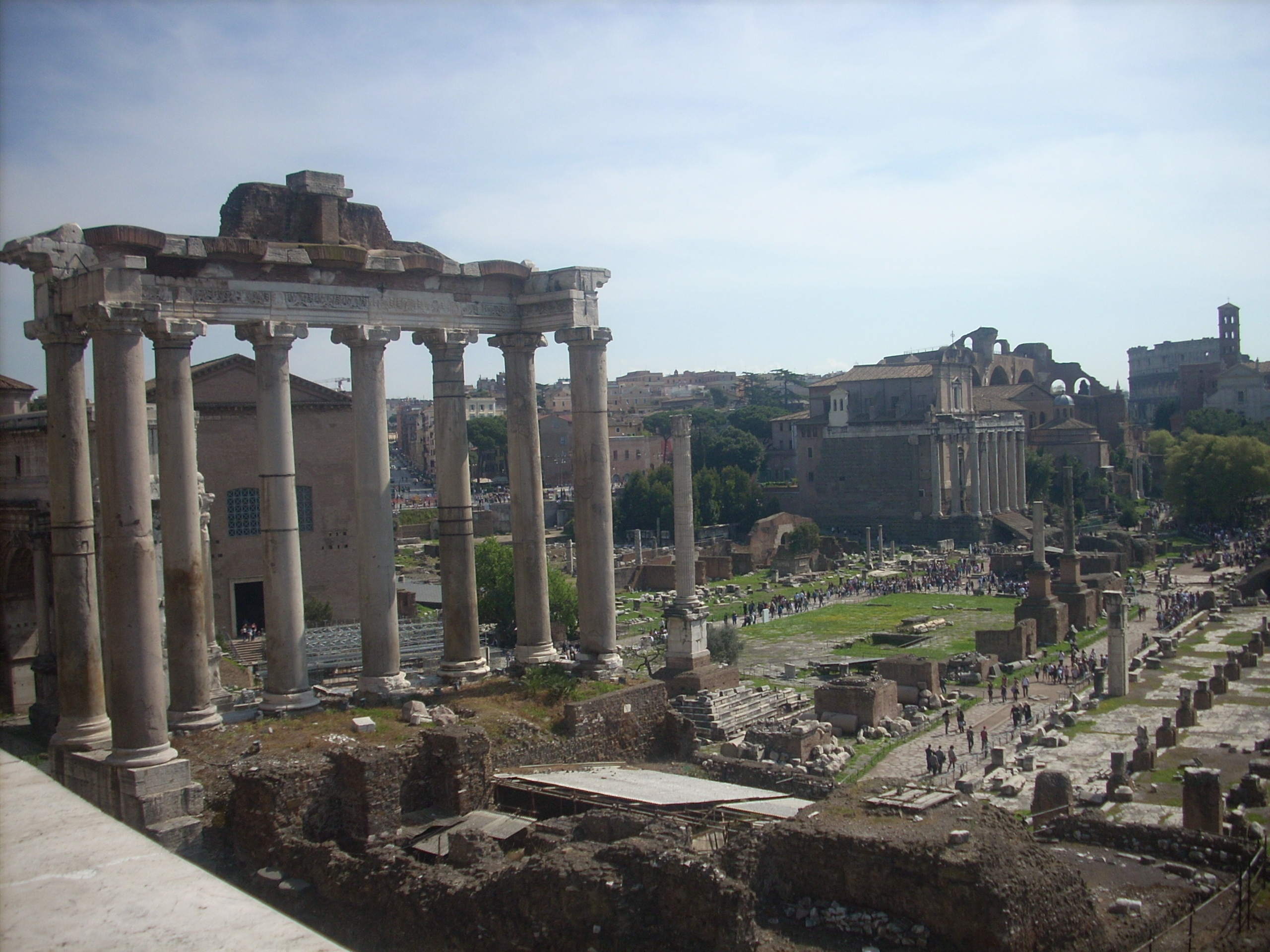
The millennia old Roman Forum in The Eternal City of Rome was the tenth Finish Line.

Airdate: June 10, 2016

- Amsterdam (Amsterdam Airport Schiphol) to Rome, Italy (Leonardo da Vinci–Fiumicino Airport)
- Bracciano (Castello Orsini-Odescalchi) (Starting Line)
- Mazzano Romano (Il Casale Sul Fiume Treja)
- Rome (Rome Gladiator School)
- Rome (Roman Forum) Finish Line

Tasks

- At Castello Orsini-Odescalchi, contestants began the leg by randomly selecting a baton, one of which had a Race the World flag. The person with the flag would be the first to attempt to form a team. If both contestants agreed, they would form a team. If the asked contestant denied, another player would be given the opportunity to form a team. Once the teams were formed, they could run to their next clue.
- After retrieving their clue, teams would find a wine barrel that they had to roll through town to a specified address to receive their next clue.
- At Il Casale Sul Fiume Treja, teams had to milk a sheep until they filled a jar to a designated line to receive their next clue.
- At the Rome Gladiator School, each team member had to learn three sets of sword maneuvers to fight against a gladiator to receive their next clue.

=== Leg 11 (Italy → South Korea) ===
At the World Peace Gate in Seoul, teams had to stack blocks to form a domino chain.

Airdate: June 17, 2016

- Rome (Leonardo da Vinci–Fiumicino Airport) to Seoul, South Korea (Incheon International Airport)
- Seoul (Samcheonggak) (Starting Line)
- Seoul (Olympic Park – World Peace Gate)
- Seoul (Seoul World Cup Stadium)
- Seoul (Jamwon Hangang Park)
- Seoul (Seoul Olympic Stadium) Finish Line

Tasks

- At Samcheonggak, teams would find a vast spread of traditional Korean cuisine. They had to choose a bowl, eat its contents, and continue until they chose the one bowl that listed their next destination on the bottom in Korean.
- At the World Peace Gate, teams had to stack blocks along a beam while avoiding a trip obstacle that would shack off their blocks. Once all of the blocks were stacked, they had to be knock over like dominoes to strike a gong, so teams could receive their next clue.
- Outside Seoul World Cup Stadium, teams had to drive an Infiniti Q50 so that it drifted into a parallel parking spot without hitting any cones and within the lines to receive their next clue.
- At Jamwon Hangang Park, one team member had to jump onto a water blob to launch their partner into the air, so they could grab onto a pole suspended over the Han River for at least five seconds to receive their next clue.

=== Leg 12 (South Korea → China) ===
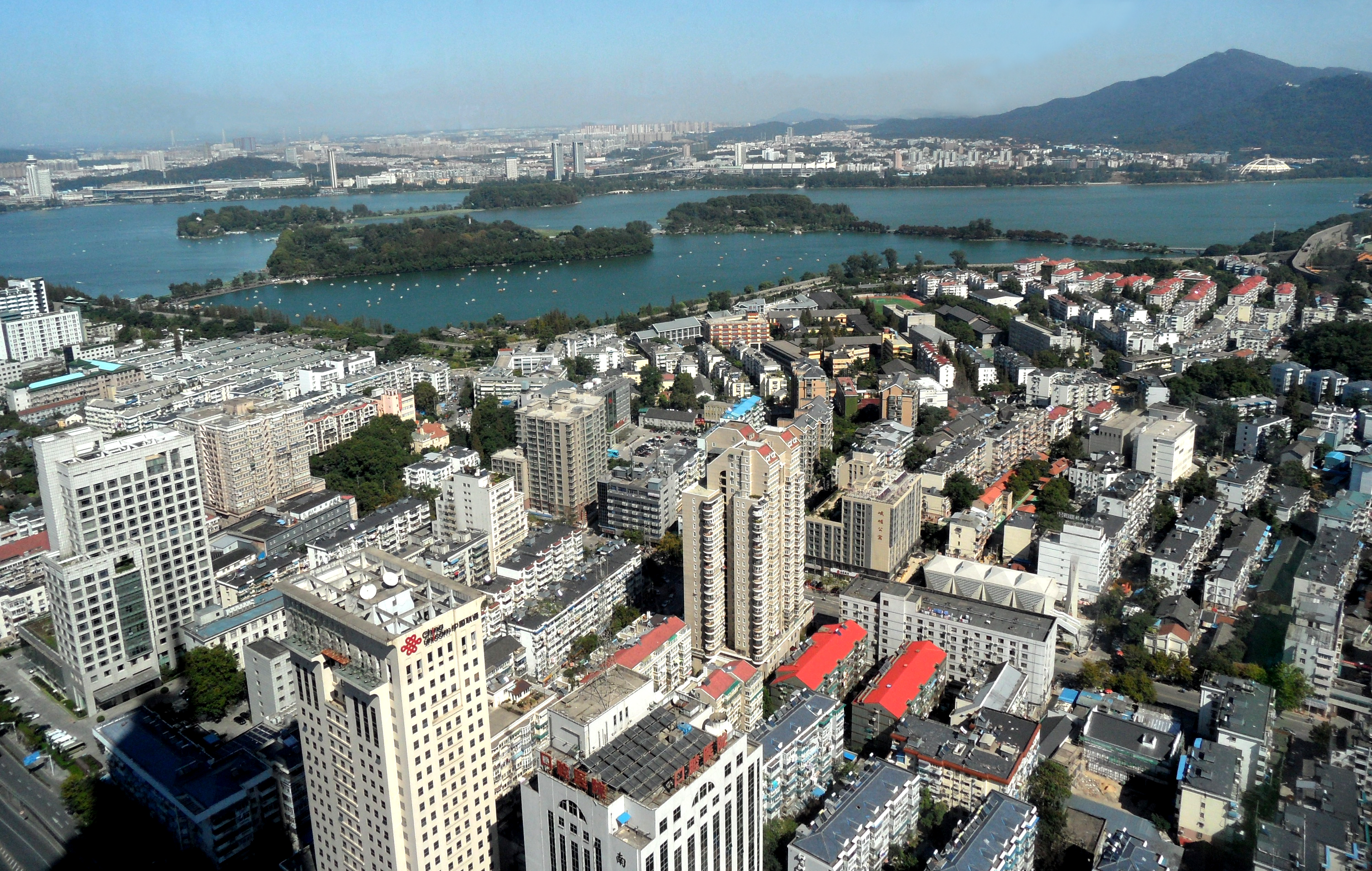
The city of Nanjing in Jiangsu was the site of the final leg.

Airdate: July 8, 2016

- Seoul (Incheon International Airport) to Nanjing, Jiangsu, China (Nanjing Lukou International Airport)
- Nanjing (Nanjing University Soccer Field) (Starting Line)
- Nanjing (Nanjing Port Container Mansion)
- Nanjing (Nanjing International Expo Center)
- Nanjing (Fishmouth Wetland Park)
- Nanjing (Nanjingyan Footbridge) Finish Line

Tasks

- At the Nanjing University Soccer Field, teams had to work with a group of students to form a human chain across the field to the other that lasted ten seconds with a board between people's feet to receive their next clue. Based on their scores from the previous two legs, Joe Cheng and Ariel Lin had to span 30 metres (98 ft), Zhu Zhu and Sheng Yilun had to span 34 metres (112 ft), Daddi Tang and Pan Xiaoting had to span 37 metres (121 ft), and Baron Chen and Wang Meng had to span 39 metres (128 ft). Previous contestants Evonne Hsieh, Leon Lai, and Vision Wei would also choose to assist one team during this task.
- At the Nanjing Port Container Mansion, each team member had ninety second to jump across four shipping containers suspended in the air to swap two flags placed on each end to receive their next clue.
- Inside the Nanjing International Expo Center, teams had to drive an Infiniti QX30 through beams of light and drive past the red lights before they change back to white six times to receive their next clue.
- At Fishmouth Wetland Park, teams had to use a scissor lift to turn a nine-level stack of large Jenga blocks into a fifteen-level stack that one member had to stand on top of for 10 seconds to receive their final clue.

== Ratings ==
Episode	Broadcast Date	CSM52 Ratings		Ranking
Episode	Broadcast Date	Ratings	View Share	Ranking
1	April 8, 2016	0.826	3.2%	8
2	April 15, 2016	0.995	3.79%	6
3	April 22, 2016	1.297	5.22%	3
4	April 29, 2016	1.22	4.76%	4
5	May 6, 2016	1.243	4.89%	3
6	May 13, 2016	1.366	5.41%	3
7	May 20, 2016	1.225	5.29%	4
8	May 27, 2016	1.143	5.25%	4
9	June 3, 2016	1.079	4.96%	4
10	June 10, 2016	1.395	6.63%	3
11	June 17, 2016	1.201	5.25%	3
12	July 8, 2016	1.036	4.47%	4

== See also ==
- The Amazing Race
- Race Around the World (Australia)
- Race Across the World (UK)
