= Nicky Li =

Chinese actress (born 1997)

- Born: 28 August 1997 (age 28); Hangzhou, China
- Occupation: Actress
- Years active: 2017–present
- Agent: Feibao Media

Chinese name
- Simplified Chinese: 厉嘉琪
- Traditional Chinese: 厲嘉琪
Transcriptions
Standard Mandarin
- Hanyu Pinyin: Lì Jiā Qí

Li Jiaqi (Chinese: 厉嘉琪, born 28 August 1997), also known as Nicky Li, is a Chinese actress and model. She is known for her roles in Wait, My Youth, My Girl, and Meteor Garden 2018.

== Early life ==
Li Jiaqi was born in Hangzhou, China on August 28, 1997. She graduated Shanghai Institute of Visual Art in June 2019. Her English name is NICKY according to her agency, Feibao Media's data, although it is rarely used, fans would mention her as Nicky Li to differentiate her from other artists with the same name.

== Acting career ==
=== 2017–present: Beginnings ===
Nicky is a newcomer actress in the Chinese drama and movie industry and has just started her career in acting. She did freelance modelling and acting since 2016. In mid-2017, she had a supporting role in I Cannot Hug You as a freelance actress. On November 9, 2017, she signed with a talent agency, Feibao Media, and officially started her career as an actress. Her debut drama is the 2018 version of Meteor Garden and she played the role of Jiang Xiao You, the female lead's best friend.

Nicky has had a rough road after her official acting debut in Meteor Garden. She did immediately got a leading role in a youth romance drama Wait, My Youth which was released on Netflix, October 27, 2019. However, she revealed in an essay written by herself that she actually failed numerous auditions for one whole year since then. She mentioned that it was a hard time for her and if she did not persist and commit to the profession she has chosen, she might have given up and quit like many of her peers in the industry.

After one year without acting job, she eventually got herself several roles and continuously filming three projects back to back in July 2019 to March 2020. In mid July 2019, she filmed a movie 会飞的蚂蚁 as a supporting role. At the end of July to October 2019, she filmed a romantic comedy drama “My Girl” as the female lead with dissociative identity disorder. This drama has been released in June 2020 and the reception is quite positive with more than 10,000 people rated the drama on Douban, as well as getting positive comments from a film critic, Tan Fei. The scriptwriter, Nan Zhen, has also won an award in 2020.

In mid-November 2019, she started filming Ni Chang which is a big budget costume drama consists of 45 episodes and a sister drama to I Will Never Let You Go a drama starring Ariel Lin. This drama is planned to be released by the end of 2020 and a possible TV broadcast.

== Personal life ==
Nicky formed a tight friendship with Hu Yixuan (胡意旋), another newcomer actress, since they met on the set of I Cannot Hug You in mid-2017. She mentioned in a variety show that that time they have spent time together everyday for about two months, then they continued to keep in touch afterwards and become best friends. Nicky and Hu Yixuan has released vlogs in which they went for trips to Japan and Macau together. They often posted pictures of them hanging out together until now.

== Filmography ==
=== Film ===
Year	English title	Chinese title	Role	Notes
2021	All Living Beings	会飞的蚂蚁	Wang Yi Jiao	Supporting
2021	See You Yesterday VR	时光投影里的秘密	Chen Jia Xi	Lead

=== Television series ===
Year	English title	Chinese title	Role	Network	Notes
2017	I Cannot Hug You 2	无法拥抱的你第二季	Cheng Mei You	Sohu TV	Supporting
2018	Meteor Garden	流星花园	Jiang Xiao You	Hunan TV	Supporting
2019	Wait, My Youth	等等啊我的青春	Su Can Can	Youku	Lead
2020	My Girl	99分女朋友	Meng Hui	Youku	Lead
2021	Ni Chang	小女霓裳	Xie Xiao Ni / Ni Chang	Youku	Lead
2021	Litter to Glitter	燃烧吧废柴	Fang Tian Zi	Youku	Lead
2022	A Romance of the Little Forest	两个人的小森林	Li Tian Tian	Youku	Supporting
2024	Debit Queen	小财迷	Ling Se		Lead

== Awards and nominations ==
Year	Award	Category	Nominated work	Result	Ref.
2020	Rayli Star Annual Ceremony and Croxx Oriental Aesthetics Night	The Most Potential Artist of the Year	—N/a	Won	
2022	Golden Bud – The Sixth Network Film And Television Festival	Newcomer Award	Ni Chang	Won	
