= Guo Junchen =

Chinese actor and singer

- Born: October 1, 1997 (age 28); Changchun, Jilin, China
- Other name: Fiction Guo
- Education: Beijing Film Academy
- Occupations: Actor; singer
- Years active: 2015–present
- Agent: Le Young Media

Chinese name
- Chinese: 郭俊辰
Transcriptions
Standard Mandarin
- Hanyu Pinyin: Guō Jùnchén

Guo Junchen (Chinese: 郭俊辰, born 1 October 1997) is a singer and Chinese actor. He officially entered the entertainment industry in December 2015 when he played the eccentric Yang Yan in the Chinese web series Go Princess Go. In 2018, Fiction co-starred with Amy Sun in the 2018 romcom Accidentally in Love.

== Education ==
Guo majored in performing arts at Beijing Film Academy.

== Career ==
In 2015, Guo made his acting debut in the hit web series Go Princess Go. In 2016, he featured in the youth sports drama The Whirlwind Girl 2.

In 2018, Guo played the main role in the romantic comedy web series Accidentally in Love. In 2019, Guo gained increased recognition for his role in the family drama Growing Pain.

== Filmography ==
=== Film ===
Year	English title	Chinese title	Role	Notes
2018	The Island	一出好戏	New colleague	Support role
2020	AI		Su Xingchen	
2020	A Zebra-Riding Boy	纸骑兵	Zuo Lin	
2023	Neverland	契阔几何	Chang Ye / "4242"	
2025	Everlasting Love	永不失联的爱	Lin Nanyi	

=== Television series ===
Year	English title	Chinese title	Role	Network	Notes/Ref.
2015	Go Princess Go	太子妃升职记	Yang Yan	LeTV	
2016	The Whirlwind Girl 2	旋風少女2	Luo Feiyu	Hunan TV	
2018	Accidentally in Love	惹上冷殿下	Situ Feng	Tencent	
2019	Growing Pain	少年派	Qian Sanyi	Hunan TV, Mango TV	
2019	Life of the White Fox	白狐的人生	Bai Xiao	Tencent	
2020	Guardians of the Ancient Oath	山海经之上古密约	Hou Zheng Ze	Hunan TV, iQIYI, Mango TV	Supporting role
2020	Su Yu	萦萦夙语亦难求	Mu Juechen	Youku	
2020	Meeting You	谢谢让我遇见你	Nan Xi	Mango TV	
2021	Good and Evil	百灵潭	Chun Yao	Mango TV	
2022	Growing Pain 2	少年派2	Qian Sanyi	Hunan TV, Mango TV	
2022	Never Grow Old	你好，昨天	Gao Zhiyuan	Viki, Youku	
2023	Beauty of Resilience	花戎	Yan Yue / Chen Yan / Mo Zun	iQIYI	
2023	The Future Handbook	明日生存指南	Chang Ye	Bilibili	Segment: "Neverland"
2024	Burning Flames	烈焰	Young Zi Yu	iQIYI	Cameo
2024	Her Fantastic Adventures	第二次“初见”	Duan Yu	iQIYI, Youku	
2025	Growing Together 2	欢乐家长群2	Ouyang Jun	Hunan TV, Mango TV	Guest role
2025	Sword and Beloved	天地剑心	Quan Rumu	iQIYI	Support role
TBA	Zong Ran	纵然	Ren Zhan / Yi Zimo	Mango TV	
TBA	Veil of Flames	引灯诀	Yan Qige	iQIYI	
TBA	Gu Le Feng Hua Lu	古乐风华录	Zhu Li	Tencent	Support role
TBA	Bloom Life	喀什古城	Zhou Hengzhi	CCTV, iQIYI	

=== Variety show ===
Year	English title	Chinese title	Role	Notes/Ref.
2019	Everybody Stand By	演员请就位	Contestant	

== Discography ==
Year	English title	Chinese title	Album	Notes
2015	"Tell Me the Future"	告诉我未来	Go Princess Go OST	

== Awards and nominations ==
Year	Award	Category	Nominated work	Result	Ref.
2016	Rayli Fashion Award Ceremony	New Force Award	—N/a	Won	
2019	Golden Data Entertainment Award	Most Promising Artist	—N/a	Won	
2019	Golden Bud – The Fourth Network Film And Television Festival	Best Actor	A Little Reunion, The Life of the White Fox	Nominated	
2020	Weibo Awards Ceremony	Rising Artist of the Year	—N/a	Won	
