= Sheng Yilun =

Chinese actor and model

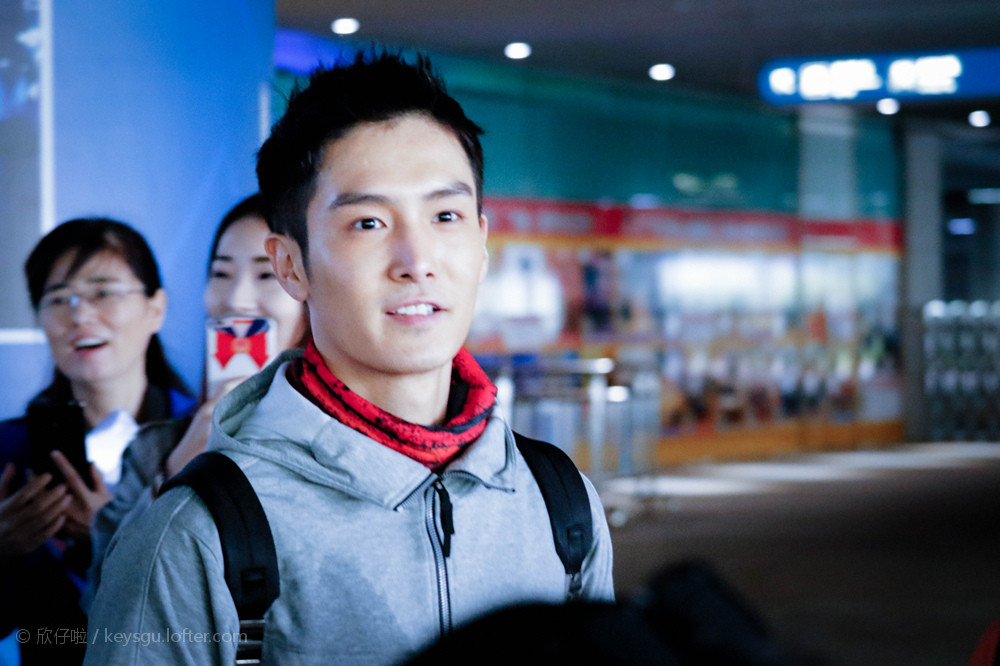
- Sheng in 2016
- Born: Sheng Xiang (盛翔); September 23, 1992 (age 33); Hangzhou, Zhejiang, China
- Occupations: Actor; Model
- Years active: 2012–present
- Agent: Sheng Yilun Studio

Chinese name
- Traditional Chinese: 盛一倫
- Simplified Chinese: 盛一伦
Transcriptions
Standard Mandarin
- Hanyu Pinyin: Shèng Yīlún

Sheng Yilun (simplified Chinese: 盛一伦; traditional Chinese: 盛一倫; pinyin: Shèng Yīlún, born September 23, 1992), also known as Peter Sheng, is a Chinese actor and model.

== Career ==
In 2012, Sheng made his acting debut in the Chinese short film, The Mirror Effect.

In 2015, Sheng rose to fame for his role in the hit Chinese historical romance parody web series, Go Princess Go.

In 2017, he starred in the romantic comedy drama Pretty Li Huizhen, fantasy drama A Life Time Love, as well as historical comedy web series Oh My General.

In 2018, Sheng was confirmed to make his big screen debut in the film A Fangirl's Romance.

In 2020, Sheng starred in the historical fantasy drama God of Lost Fantasy.

== Filmography ==
=== Film ===
Year	English title	Chinese title	Role	Notes
2012	The Mirror Effect	镜像效应	A'wei	Short film
2017	Ballerina	了不起的菲丽西	Victor	Voice-dubbed
2018	Those Names Are Those Years	那些名字那些年	Zhang Peng	Charity film
TBA	A Fangirl's Romance	迷妹罗曼史	Gao Ge	
TBA	Start It Up	启动人生		
TBA	Love Dialogue	爱情对话框		Special appearance

=== Television series ===
Year	English title	Chinese title	Role	Network	Notes
2015	Go Princess Go	太子妃升职记	Crown Prince Qi Sheng	LeTV	
2017	Pretty Li Huizhen	漂亮的李慧珍	Bai Haoyu	Hunan TV	
2017	A Life Time Love	上古情歌	Sheng Lun	Dragon TV	
2017	Oh My General	将军在上	Zhao Yujin	Youku	
2018	Women in Shanghai	上海女子图鉴	Yan Bing	Youku	Special appearance
2020	God of Lost Fantasy	太古神王	Qin Wentian	Youku	
2025	Legend of The Female General	锦月如歌	Yan He	Tencent Video; Hunan TV	
TBA	Shanghai Picked Flowers	十里洋场拾年花	Feng Yilun	TBA	
TBA	If I Can Never Love You	如果可以，绝不爱你	Ye Rongxuan	TBA	
TBA	The Legend of Xiao Chuo	燕云台	Dalan A'bo	TBA	Guest appearance
TBA	Legend of Wu Zi Xu	白马曾骑踏海潮	Wu Zixu		

=== Variety show ===
Year	English title	Chinese title	Role	Network	Notes
2016	Race the World	非凡搭档	Cast member	Various	
2018	Clash Bots	机器人争霸	Cast member	iQiyi	

== Discography ==
Year	English title	Chinese title	Album	Notes
2015	"Whirlpool"	漩涡	Go Princess Go OST	
2015	"The Future of the Past"	以前的以后	Go Princess Go OST	
2015	"Can Miss But Not Say"	可念不可说	Go Princess Go OST	with Cui Zige
2016	"Dare to Love and Fight"	敢愛敢戰	Race the World OST	
2017	"Loyalty"	忠贞	Oh My General OST	
2017	"Love is Above All"	爱在上	Oh My General OST	with Cui Zige
2018	"Dream Westlake"	梦西湖	Everlasting Classics	

== Awards and nominations ==
Year	Event	Category	Nominated work	Result	Ref.
2016	Rayli Fashion Award Ceremony	New Force Award	—N/a	Won	
2016	Jumei Award Ceremony	Quality Male Idol	Go Princess Go	Won	
2017	Rayli Asian AngelaFans Festival	Most Popular Male Artist	—N/a	Won	
2019	iFeng Fashion Choice Awards	Fashion Figure of the Year	—N/a	Won	
