= Welcome to Shama Town =

2010 film

- Traditional Chinese: 決戰剎馬鎮
- Simplified Chinese: 决战刹马镇
- Hanyu Pinyin: Juézhàn Shàmǎ Zhèn
- Directed by: Li Weiran
- Written by: Li Weiran; Zhou Zhiyong
- Produced by: Zhuo Shunguo; Lu Yang
- Starring: Sun Honglei; Lin Chi-ling; Li Liqun; Gan Wei
- Cinematography: Zhao Xiaoding
- Music by: Dong Dongdong
- Production companies: Shanghai Media Group; LeTV Investment Co. Ltd
- Distributed by: China Film Group Corporation; Huaxia Film Distribution Company; Dadi Time Film Distribution Co., LTD; Shanghai Star Cultural Transmission Co., LTD.
- Release date: June 22, 2010
- Running time: 104 minutes
- Country: China
- Language: Mandarin
- Box office: ¥25 million

Welcome to Shama Town is a 2010 Chinese adventure film directed and written by Li Weiran, starring Sun Honglei, Lin Chi-ling, Li Liqun, and Gan Wei. It was distributed by Shanghai Media Group and LeTV Investment Co. Ltd and released by China Film Group Corporation, Huaxia Film Distribution Company, Dadi Time Film Distribution Co., LTD, and Shanghai Star Cultural Transmission Co., LTD. It was released in China on 22 June 2010.

The film received a nomination at the 47th Golden Horse Awards in the Best New Director category.

== Cast ==
- Sun Honglei as Tang Gaopeng, the Village Chief of Shama Town.
- Lin Chi-ling as Chun Niang, Tang Gaopeng's lover.
- Li Liqun as Zhou Dingbang, the tomb raider.
- Gan Wei as Tao Hua
- Ma Jian as Gui Zhong.
- Xie Yuan as Mian Bin.
- Ma Delin as Da Pao.
- Huang Haibo as Da Cui, the cultural relics dealer.
- Cao Bingkun as Chen Dili.
- Bao Bei'er as Lu Maoku.
- Zhao Ziqi as the newspaper woman.
- Cica Zhou as the female bodyguard.
- Ma Li as Mian Bin's wife.
- Michael Stephen Kai as Xiao P.

== Production ==
Sun Honglei filmed several scenes in Yongtai Ancient City, Yellow River Stone Forest, and Dunhuang Studio in Gansu, China.

== Release ==
It was released in mainland China on 22 June 2010.

== Box office ==
It grossed ¥25 million on its opening weekend, it was a huge hit at the box office and flew straight to the top of the box office. It grossed ¥40 million on its second weekend.
