= Fake Princess =

- Also known as: Counterfeit Crown Princess, Replacement Crown Princess, Fake Princess Consort
- Traditional Chinese: 山寨小萌主
- Simplified Chinese: 山寨小萌主
- Hanyu Pinyin: Shānzhài Xiǎo Méng Zhǔ
- Genre: Historical fiction
- Based on: Mao Pai Tai Zi Fei (冒牌太子妃) by Shui Sheng
- Written by: Jia Li Yi
- Directed by: Zoe Qin
- Starring: Zhao Yiqin, Eleanor Lee, Garvey Jin, Chen Si Yu
- Country of origin: China
- Original language: Mandarin
- No. of episodes: 27

Production
- Production location: Hengdian World Studios
- Production company: Mango TV

Original release
- Network: Mango TV (China); Amazon Prime (International)
- Release: May 7 – June 1, 2020

Fake Princess (Chinese: 山寨小萌主, Pinyin: Shānzhài Xiǎo Méng Zhǔ) is a 2020 Chinese television series starring Zhao Yiqin, Eleanor Lee, Garvey Jin and Chen Si Yu. The series aired on Mango TV from May 17 to June 1, 2020.

== Synopsis ==
For a chest full of gold, Chang Le agrees to marry a duplicitous prince, marking the start of a beautiful romance.

Chang Le is no longer free and untameable, having become the fake bride of Crown Prince Li Che. Once settled in the palace, she routinely faces humiliation. Despite this uncomfortable situation, she adapts like a feral cat showing its true stripes. Li Che who has planned out every step meticulously, slowly finds himself attracted by Chang Le's liveliness. Despite wearing masks to hide their true intentions, they both of them manage to find comfort in each other.

== Cast ==
=== Main ===
- Eleanor Lee as Duan Chang Le/ Liu Yu Yao
  - A female bandit who is very greedy for money. Because she looks similar to the Prime Minister's granddaughter, Liu Yu Yao, she is bought off for a box of gold. She enters the palace by mistake and marries the Crown Prince.
- Zhao Yiqin as Crown Prince Li Che
  - The son of the former empress Shen Yu Jin, he was named Crown Prince at an early age, and is deep and wise.
- Garvey Jin as Li Heng
  - The son of Empress Liu and the 5th son of the Emperor. Gentle, talented and extremely filial, Li Heng is a devoted prince, and will do anything for his love.
- Chen Si Yu as Gong Sun Mo
  - He is completely loyal to the crown prince. He grew up with the Crown Prince when he was young, and he suffered constantly in order to save the Prince.

=== Supporting ===
- Wang Yi Tian as Nong Ying/ Liu Shuang Shuang
  - Liu Yu Yao’s personal maid, she is ruthless and prefers to be silent.
- Sun Xue Ning as Zhu Yan
  - She is Li Heng's love interest. But because her family supports the Crown Prince, she and Li Heng are forbidden to be together.
- Zhang Xin Ning as Empress Liu Hai Jao
  - Ambitious and evil, she is a woman who longs for power. She is the mother of Li Heng and the aunt of Liu Yu Yao.
- Jeremy Wang as Li Lu
  - Li Lu is the son of Noble Consort Wang and the 7th son of the Emperor. He shares a close relationship with Li Heng and even helps him to meet with Zhu Yan.

=== Others ===
- Guan Xuan as Emperor Li Chang Ye
- Lan Cheng as Liu Sheng
- Xu Xin as Liu Han Si
- Shao Jia as Qin Fei Yu
- Amber Song as Princess Ali Aiti of Ye Ming
- Guo Zhen as General Shen Ao
- Zhu Peng Chen as Gongsun Zhen Qing
- Wang Kuan Yu as Shen Zi
- Zhang Zi Han as Shi Tou (Bandit)
- Kong Bi Yu as a Bandit
- Han Zhi Gang as San Shu (Bandit)
- Yang Nuo as Zhang Meng (Bandit)
- Liu Yue Tao as Chen Qing Lan (Zhu Yan's cousin)
- Xu Yan Yu as Ye Tao Hua (rape victim)
- Bai Xiao Hong as Aunt Luo (Peach blossom villager)
- Yang Yu Lan as Nong Ying's mother
- Han Jian Hua as Taoist Priest
- Bai Li Wei as Physician Xue
- Wan Xin Yan as Lady Dong
- Jenna Wang as Duan Nian'er
- Liu Guo Ji as Bai Shi Tong
- Wang Zi Qing as Empress Shen Yu Jin
- Li Hai Dong as Lao Zhang
- Zhao Cong as Gang Ban
- Kong Xiang Fu as Green clothed youth
- Ivan Xu as Wang Dong Jie
