= Fan Zhixin =

Chinese actor and singer (born 1999)

- Born: June 20, 1999 (age 27); Jiamusi, Heilongjiang, China
- Education: Beijing Institute of Fashion Technology
- Occupation: Actor
- Years active: 2018–present
- Agent: Jay Walk Studio
- Height: 184 cm (6 ft 1/2 in)

Chinese name
- Simplified Chinese: 樊治欣
- Hanyu Pinyin: Fán Zhìxīn

Fan Zhixin (Chinese: 樊治欣, born June 20, 1999), is a Chinese actor. He is best known for his roles in the series My Girl (2020), My Lethal Man (2023) and Present is Present (2024).

== Filmography ==
=== Television series ===
Year	Title	Role	Notes	Ref.
2019	Mountains and Ocean	Ye Miao		
2020	Eternal Love of Dream	Chong Lin		
2020	My Girl	Sui An		
2021	Miss Crow with Mr. Lizard	Chen Chen	Cameo (Ep. 8, 19-21)	
2021	Time Flies and You Are Here	Zhong Ziyan / Xing Zhou		
2021	Our Secret	Su Bocong		
2022	Hello, The Sharpshooter	Xiao Zhao		
2022	Childe Xie's Wine	Xie Xun / Xie Tuisi		
2022	Stay with Me as Before	Song Yang		
2023	My Lethal Man	Yan Xingcheng / Yan Yi		
2023	Wenderella's Diary	Su Ziguang		
2023	Dear Liar	Qin Li		
2023	Miss Chun Is a Litigator	Han Wuwei		
2024	Present Is Present	Wei Ziqi		
2024	Be Your Knight	Ye Ran / Xiang Tingdong		
2025	Game of True Love	Shen Jiahe		
2025	Fall in You	Gu Jingyuan		
2025	Luminosity Behind The Palace	Yin Changyan		
2026	Turbulent Love	Ji Zhijie		
2026	Touch Me Like You Lied	Luo He		
TBA	In Her Eyes	Lin Yachen		
