= Eleanor Lee =

Singaporean actress-singer (born 1999)

- Born: Eleanor Yu Kai-xin; 12 October 1999 (age 27); Taipei, Taiwan
- Citizenship: Singapore (by descent)
- Education: Nexus International School; Beijing Film Academy
- Occupations: Actress; singer; model
- Years active: 2014–present
- Parents: Peter Yu (father); Quan Yi Fong (mother)
- Relatives: Addy Lee (godfather)
- Musical career
- Genre: Mandopop
- Instruments: Vocals; guitar; piano; drums

Stage name
- Traditional Chinese: 李凱馨
- Simplified Chinese: 李凯馨
- Hanyu Pinyin: Lǐ Kǎi-Xīn
- Wade–Giles: Li Kʻai-Hsin
- Tongyong Pinyin: Li Kai-Sin
- Jyutping: Lei5 Hoi2 Hing1
- Hokkien POJ: Lí Khái-heng
- Tâi-lô: Lí Khái-hing

Birth name (Yu Kai-xin)
- Traditional Chinese: 俞凱馨
- Simplified Chinese: 俞凯馨
- Hanyu Pinyin: Yú Kǎi-Xīn
- Wade–Giles: Yu Kʻai-Hsin
- Tongyong Pinyin: Yu Kai-Sin
- Jyutping: Jyu4 Hoi2 Hing1
- Hokkien POJ: Jû Khái-heng
- Tâi-lô: Jû Khái-hing

Eleanor Lee Kai-xin (born 12 October 1999) is a Singaporean actress and singer based in China.

== Early life and education ==
Eleanor Yu Kai-xin (Chinese: 俞凱馨; pinyin: Yú Kǎixīn; Pe̍h-ōe-jī: Jû Khái-heng) was born on 12 October 1999 in Taipei, Taiwan to 25-year-old Quan Yi Fong and 31-year-old Peter Yu. She was born by caesarean section during an aftershock of the 1999 Jiji earthquake. She has two younger paternal half-brother Christian (born 2012) and Israel (born 2016). She is of Chinese descent, her mother is from Taiwan and her father has Teochew ancestry.

On 3 January 2009, her parents filed for divorce, leaving her in the custody of both parents. She was then under maternal care by her mother after her parents decided to part ways amicably. Her father and her met once a few years ago, gave each other their blessings, and decided not to keep in contact. Just after her parents' divorce, she was adopted by Addy Lee as his goddaughter. During her 14th birthday party sponsored by Addy Lee, she announced the adoption of her godfather's surname.

Lee was educated at Tao Nan School before studying at Nexus International School Singapore. Prior to becoming an actress, she was a model for Addyli Hair Care Product, founded by Addy Lee. In July 2017, she was admitted into Beijing Film Academy.

== Career ==
In 2014, Apple China was auditioning for someone to star as the female lead in their micro film, The Old Record, but were unable to find a suitable candidate. Addy Lee chanced upon the news, and recommended Lee to audition for the role. In the end, she was selected. When The Old Record was released on 2 February 2015, she garnered huge amount of attention from the public, and was subsequently signed to Beijing Summer Star Media Co. Ltd.

Since then, Lee was constantly involved in filming advertisements and dramas in China, and in 2015, she was chosen by Cao Dun to play the younger version of Xu Lu's character in Tribes and Empires: Storm of Prophecy. In November 2015, Lee collaborated with Wu Qiang, producing two pieces of artwork that were to be sold at $13,500 each. She then released her first song, "Noble Aspirations" with Wu Junyu, as the theme song of Noble Aspirations.

In March 2017, Lee starred as one of the leads in Solaso Bistro, based on the Japanese drama A Restaurant with Many Problems. In June 2017, she was cast as the female lead in Chinese drama, Overseas Security Officer, alongside Leon Lai. In September 2017, Lee played the female lead in the campus drama, The Big Boss. In October 2017, she released her first single, "That Girl". She continued to release two more singles the same year; "Ink Pen and Eraser", as well as self composed single titled "Be Together".

In 2018, Lee was cast in the Chinese fantasy drama My Poseidon, followed by drama Blowing in the Wind.

In 2020, Lee starred in the romance fantasy web film The Enchanting Phantom, adapted from the 1987 film A Chinese Ghost Story. She also starred in starred in the youth romance drama My Love, Enlighten Me, and historical romance drama Fake Princess.

In May 2025, a leaked audio clip surfaced online of Lee calling Chinese nationals “stupid”. Lee denied these claims publicly.

== Controversy ==
On 9 May 2025, an audio clip allegedly featuring Lee saying, "most people in China are idiots," and "I don’t care about fame, as long as there is money to earn," drew backlash after circulating on Chinese social media. In response, Lee denied being the speaker and called the clip fabricated. She expressed her love and gratitude for China and implied her recognition of Taiwan as part of China by claiming she was "born in China". According to her agency, the clip was created and released by Lee's former assistant. In the wake of the controversy, Lee's name was removed from promotional materials for the Chinese drama The Journey of Legend. On May 12, Lee's godfather Andy Lee posted on Weibo accusing Lee and her mother of ingratitude, stating that their relationship had broken down years earlier and describing the dispute as "karma".

On May 21, a Weibo user claimed to be Lee's former assistant publicly apologized, admitting to fabricating the audio. The assistant, identifying himself as "Xiao Pang" (Chinese: 小胖), confessed to maliciously editing and synthesizing the clip, which falsely portrayed Lee insulting Chinese citizens. He stated the act was in retaliation over unresolved disputes with Lee's former management company and had intended to use the recording in negotiations. On June 23, a Chinese court ruled in favor of Li in her defamation lawsuit against the former assistant; the judgment took effect on July 17. The defendant was ordered to publish an apology for his false statements and to pay damages and related costs. In September, The Journey of Legend was released, with Lee's scenes retained.

== Filmography ==
=== Film ===
Year	Title	Role	Notes	Ref.
2020	The Enchanting Phantom (倩女幽魂人间情)	Nie Xiaoqian	Web film	
TBA	A Zebra - Riding Boy (纸骑兵)	Qingqing		
TBA	L.A. Rush (加州游戏)	Nicole		

=== Television series ===
Year	Title	Role	Notes	Ref.
2010	The Illusionist 魔幻视界	Irene Chan (child)		
2017	Solaso Bistro 问题餐厅	Yuan Qianjia		
2017	The Big Boss 班长大人	Ye Muxi		
2017	Tribes and Empires: Storm of Prophecy	Su Yuning (young)		
2018	Overseas Security Officer 非常营救	An Da		
2019	My Poseidon 我的波塞冬	An Fei		
2019	Blowing in the Wind 强风吹拂	Lin Feng		
2020	My Love, Enlighten Me 暖暖请多指教	Liu Nuannuan		
2020	Fake Princess	Liu Yuyao / Chang Le		

== Discography ==
Year	Title	Album	Notes	Ref.
2016	"Noble Aspirations" 青云志	Noble Aspirations OST	with Wu Junyu	
2017	"Youth Stage" 青春上演	The Big Boss OST	with Dai Jingyao	
2017	"Your Shadow" 你的身影	The Big Boss OST		
2017	"That Girl" 那个女孩			
2017	"Ink Pen and Eraser" 墨水笔与橡皮擦			
2017	"Be Together" 在一起			
2019	"It is Raining, Where are You" 下雨了，你在哪里	My Poseidon OST	with Zhang Yunlong	
2019	"My Ocean" 我的海洋	My Poseidon OST		
2019	"Faster Come Back" 快回来吧	Blowing in The Wind OST		
2019	"The Whole World's Secrets" 全世界的秘密	Blowing in The Wind OST	with Xing Zhaolin	
2020	"The Best Luck" 最好的幸运	My Love, Enlighten Me OST		

== Awards and nominations ==
Year	Ceremony	Category	Nominated work	Result
2021	Star Awards	Top 10 Most Popular Female Artistes	—N/a	Nominated
