= Accidentally in Love (TV series) =

2018 Chinese television drama

- Genre: Romantic-comedy
- Directed by: Zhong Qing
- Starring: Guo Jun Chen; Sun Yi Ning; Ma Li; Zhao Yi Qin
- Country of origin: China
- Original language: Mandarin

Production
- Running time: 23–35 min

Original release
- Network: Tencent
- Release: August 8 – August 20, 2018

Accidentally in Love (Chinese : 惹上冷殿下, pinyin : Rě Shàng Lěng Diàn Xià) is a 2018 Mandarin-language Chinese television drama television series starring Guo Jun Chen, Sun Yi Ning, Ma Li, and Zhao Yi Qin. This drama aired on Tencent and Mango TV from August to September 2018. It was licensed by Netflix as an original series.

== Synopsis ==
This musical romantic comedy is a hate-to-love story set in Yuncheng, Shanxi province. The protagonist is a quirky young woman, Chen Qing Qing, who runs away from her wealthy grandfather and unwanted marriage. Because she is pursued by her grandfather's employees, she has to use a series of disguises and fake names, which create comedic situations. The male lead is an arrogant, cold, top musical star named Situ Feng (stage name 'Your Highness'), who is ambivalent about fame and has a hostile relationship with his father.

== Cast ==
- Guo Jun Chen as Situ Feng/ 'Your Highness'
- Sun Yi Ning as Chen Qing Qing/Qing Shen/Chen You You (Qing Qing's mother) Chen Qingqing(陳青青) and Chen Youyou(陳悠悠) were named after "Qing Qing Zi Jin, You You Wo Xin("青青"子衿 "悠悠"我心, The way you are dressed impresses me so deeply that I desire to see you at any moment of day)" which is a part of the show's ost "To be your love" and also an old Chinese poem Duan ge xing(短歌行)
- Ma Li as Gu Nan Xi
- Zhao Yi Qin as Lin Yi Yang
- Zhou Mo as Zhang Fang Fang
- Yan Hao Yuan as Hua Mu Nian
- Cheng Mu Xuan as Lan Xin Ya
- Yuan Hao as Lu Jing Yang (Qing Qing's fiancé)
- Pan Le Yi as Lan Xin Yu
- Guo Zhen as Situ Jie (Feng's father)
- Maggic Feng as music company owner
