= Go Princess Go =

- Promotional poster
- Genre: Romance; Comedy; Historical; Time-travel
- Based on: Go Princess Go by Xian Chen
- Written by: Qin Shuang; Shang Menglu
- Directed by: Lu Hao Ji Ji
- Starring: Zhang Tianai; Sheng Yilun; Yu Menglong; Jiang Qilin; Guo Junchen
- Opening theme: "Can Miss But Not Say" by Cui Zige
- Ending theme: "The Past of the Future" by Sheng Yilun
- Country of origin: China
- Original language: Mandarin
- No. of episodes: 36

Production
- Producers: Zhang Shao; Gan Wei
- Production locations: Xiangshan Movie & Television Town
- Running time: 30 mins
- Production company: Le Young Pictures

Original release
- Network: LeTV
- Release: 13 December 2015

Related
- Mr. Queen

Go Princess Go (Chinese: 太子妃升职记; pinyin: Tàizǐfēi Shēngzhí Jì) is a 2015 Chinese streaming series produced by and aired on the streaming service LeTV. The story was adapted from the novel of the same name by Xian Chen. The series stars Zhang Tianai, Sheng Yilun, Yu Menglong, Jiang Qilin and Guo Junchen in the lead roles. It premiered in December 2015 with 35 episodes. The show incorporates various themes such as time travel, bisexuality and gender identity. A third of the show was censored in China.

== Synopsis ==
A modern playboy travels back in time 1,000 years to find himself in the body of a royal princess. As a man inside a woman's body, he enjoys flirting and touching his husband's concubines with little impunity. Once he discovers his more feminine side, he truly falls in love with his husband.

The show has three endings: the original, and the series has two alternate endings. One of them was filmed long after the first two. It is a parody of historical dramas.

== Cast ==
=== Main ===
- Zhang Tianai as Zhang Pengpeng (Female)
  - Zhang Zhiyuan as Zhang Peng (Male)

A modern playboy travels back in time 1,000 years and finds himself in the body of the crown princess.

- Sheng Yilun as Qi Sheng

Crown Prince. An intelligent and cunning man of few words.

- Yu Menglong as Qi Han

Ninth Prince. A gentle and sophisticated man with intricate and complex thoughts. He goes against Qi Sheng in political affairs, as well as compete for Zhang Pengpeng's love with him.

- Jiang Qilin as Prince Zhao

A man who appears foolish but hides a complex train of thought. He appears to be at odd with Qi Sheng, but actually works together with him to bring down Qi Han. He marries Lu Li.

- Guo Junchen as Yang Yan

Son of a general. Qi Han's closest aide.

=== Supporting ===
- Hai Ling as Lu Li

Zhang Pengpeng's personal attendant. A bright, straightforward and loyal girl.

- An Yongchang as Jiang Yingyue

Prince Zhao's wife. She has an illicit relationship with Qi Sheng.

- Chen Shi as Empress Dowager
- Peng Yuchang as Eunuch Qiang

Qi Sheng's attendant. He likes Lu Li.

- Zai Yishu as Huang Liangyuan
- Cheng Xiaojin as Chen Liangdi
- Zheng Shuhuai as Wang Shaoxun
- Hu Yue as Li Chengxun
- Sun Fengzheng as Eunuch Li – A
- Sun Fengzhao as Eunuch Li – B
- Chen Hao as Yang Yu

Yang Yan's father.

- Chai Wei as Zhang Lingling

Zhang Pengpeng's niece. Yang Yan's wife.

- Xu Yiwen as Zhang's mother
- Zhang Chen as Doctor Song
- Ben Jieming as Guard Li
- Wang Wenqiang as Guard
- Zhou Le as Guard
- Liu Yining as Deliveryman

== Production ==
The drama's adaptation rights were bought in 2012 by producer Gan Wei, and pre-production started in 2014. The series is directed by Lu Hao Ji Ji and written by Qin Shuang, who kept the main structure of the storyline but made considerable changes to better fit the screenplay adaptation and increase the pacing and fluidity. Due to the short production time of 70 days, insufficient time and funds were used to prepare the props, and product placements have to be inserted into the show.

The series began filming at Xiangshan Movie & Television Town in August 2015.

== Soundtrack ==
No.	Title	Singers	Length
1.	"Can Miss But Not Say (可念不可说)"	Cui Zige
2.	"Whirlpool (漩涡)"	Sheng Yilun
3.	"The Future of the Past (以前的以后)"	Sheng Yilun
4.	"Tell Me The Future (告诉我未来)"	Guo Junchen
5.	"Warm Heart (暖心)"	Diao Lili

== Reception ==
Despite its low budget of 20 million yuan (US$3 million) and cast of amateur actors, the show became highly successful and was termed as a "viral internet comedy". The show has generated over $1.5 million (41 million yuan) in profit, 50,000 paid subscribers, 2.2 million new memberships, and had over 2.6 billion views in total. At one point the show was a No. 1 trending topic on Weibo for 10 consecutive days.

Critics attribute the success of the show to its short length of 30 minutes, thus appealing to younger audience with shorter attention span. Also, the show was broadcast online and allowed viewers to post comments and discuss the storyline with others, making the watching experience more interactive. The transgender angle also makes the series more topical, helping break down barriers in discussing gender change and homosexuality. Oppositely, the series has been criticized for being "lousy" and appealing to "low-brow tastes".

However, it has suffered from interference by Chinese censors. The show was taken offline on January 20, 2016 following a request by the State Administration of Press, Publication, Radio, Film and Television. It has been speculated that this is due to the censors' dislike of sexual scenes, vulgar language and time-travel themes. The show was made available again around January 28, 2016, with a number of cuts, roughly about a third of the show – "seven to eight minutes in each episode". As of 2016 LeTV was considering a movie sequel to the show.

== Sequel ==
In July 2023, a sequel was aired, first titled "Go Princess Go2", and later retitled "The Princess and The Werewolf" (Chinese: 郎君不如意; pinyin: Láng jūn bùrúyì) as a comedic romance spin on the Beauty and the Beast fairy tale, in which the daughter of the couple in Go Princess GO, finds herself abducted by a seductive Wolf king. King Kui Mulang wishes to marry her so he can safely recover his "power pearl", that she accidentally swallowed. Filming period: 2021-Jun-29 to 2021-Sep-29. The TV series aired on the Youku platform on July 20, 2023, for 30 episodes until August 18. It was directed by Cheng Feng and stars Chen Zheyuan as Kui Mulang/Li Xiong for the shape shifting wolf, and Wu Xuanyi as princess Qipa. The show reached 7000 popularity index on Youku on July 23, 2023.

== Awards and nominations ==
Award	Category	Nominee	Result	Ref.
1st Golden Guduo Media Awards	Most Popular Web Series	Go Princess Go	Won	
1st Golden Guduo Media Awards	Best Actress (Web series)	Zhang Tian'ai	Won	
1st Golden Guduo Media Awards	Weibo Fans' Choice Popularity Award	Zhang Tian'ai	Won	
1st Asia New Media Film Festival	Best Cinematography (Web series)	Go Princess Go	Won	
2016 ENAwards	Top Ten Web series	Go Princess Go	Won	

== Remake ==
In June 2018, it was announced that the drama will have a Korean remake which will be helmed by Fox Networks Group Asia Pacific and Endeavor China together with YG STUDIOPLEX and LYD Networks. Two years since the announcement, it was picked up by local pay TV channel tvN but only YG STUDIOPLEX and LYD Networks (which became an investor instead of a co-production role due to financial difficulty) went on for the project with new production partners, CJ ENM's Studio Dragon and independent company Crave Works.

The adaptation, titled Mr. Queen, aired on tvN on December 12, 2020.
