= Gan Wei =

Chinese actress

- Born: 21 May 1984 (age 42); Chongqing, China
- Other name: Vivian Gan
- Education: People's Liberation Army Academy of Art
- Occupations: Actress, web producer
- Years active: 2009–present
- Children: 3

Chinese name
- Chinese: 甘薇
Transcriptions
Standard Mandarin
- Hanyu Pinyin: Gān Wēi

Gan Wei (Chinese: 甘薇, born 21 May 1984), also known as Vivian Gan, is a Chinese actress and the founder of LeYoung Pictures which produced the hit web series Go Princess Go (2015). Gan has had supporting roles in multiple films, but is perhaps better known as the wife of billionaire Jia Yueting.

In 2017, after Jia Yueting was put on China's debt blacklist, he refused to return to China despite a court order. Gan Wei and Jia's brother were tasked to settle his debts.

In early 2018, Gan Wei was put onto the list of defaulters by Beijing No.3 Intermediate People’s Court, which made her subject to travel restrictions.

== Filmography ==
=== Film ===
Year	English title	Chinese title	Role	Notes
2009	Kungfu Cyborg	機器俠	Zhou Suqing	
2010	Welcome to Shama Town	决战刹马镇	Tao Hua	
2011	A Land Without Boundaries	无界之地	Hengsha	
2011	Love Is Not Blind	失恋33天	First girl in dream	
2012	Crazy GPS	疯狂的GPS	Xiaoze	
2012	The Zodiac Mystery	十二星座离奇事件	Tang Lin	
2012	Time Flies Soundlessly	岁月无声	Ma Hongmei	
2016	Who Sleeps My Bro	睡在我上铺的兄弟	Mary	
2017	Gui Ma Deng	五行者之鬼马灯	Jiang Xiaoqiao	web film
2018	AI Is Coming	超级APP		web film

=== Web series ===
Year	English title	Chinese title	Role	Notes
2009	Promise	约定		
2012	The Girls	女人帮·妞儿	Xiaochun	also co-producer
2015	Go Princess Go	太子妃升职记		co-producer
2017	Inference Notes	推理笔记		associate producer
