= Zhao Yiqin =

Chinese actor

- Born: May 31, 1997 (age 28); Jining, Shandong, China
- Education: Communication University of China
- Occupation: Actor
- Years active: 2016–present
- Agent: Huanyu Film

Chinese name
- Simplified Chinese: 赵弈钦
- Traditional Chinese: 趙弈欽
Transcriptions
Standard Mandarin
- Hanyu Pinyin: Zhào Yì Qīn

Zhao Yiqin (Chinese: 赵弈钦, born 31 May 1997) is a Chinese actor.

== Early life and education ==
Zhao Yi Qin was born on May 31, 1997, in Jining, Shandong, China. He is currently studying at Communication University of China.

== Career ==
In 2016, Zhao signed a contract with Huanyu Film, an entertainment company owned by Yu Zheng, and entered the entertainment industry. He was then cast in the crime drama Memory Lost. The same year he was cast in the historical fantasy television series, Zhaoge.

Zhao gained recognition with his supporting roles in the historical comedy drama King is Not Easy, and romantic comedy drama Accidentally In Love; as well as historical fiction TV series The Legend of Haolan where he plays Prince Yi of Zhao.

In 2019, Zhao starred in the youth drama Salute to My Youth as his first leading role. He received positive reviews and experienced a rise in popularity.

In 2020, Zhao starred in the historical romance drama Fake Princess. The same year, he starred in romance comedy drama My Girl, palace romance drama Love Story of Court Enemies, and youth suspense drama Consummation.

== Filmography ==
=== Film ===
Year	English title	Chinese title	Role	Notes
2017	Da Luan Dou: Shao Nian Jue Xing	大乱斗之少年觉醒	Lin Mo	
2018	Yi Fan Qiu Yang	一帆秋阳	Jiang Yifan	
2021	1921	1921	Xiao Jingguang	

=== Television series ===
Year	English title	Chinese title	Role	Notes
2016	Memory Lost	美人为馅	Mu Fangcheng	
2017	King is Not Easy	大王不容易	Shao Yong	
2018	Untouchable Lovers	凤囚凰	Jiang Yan	
2018	Accidentally in Love	惹上冷殿下	Lin Yiqang	
2019	The Legend of Haolan	皓镧传	Prince Yi of Zhao	
2019	Wait, My Youth	等等啊我的青春	Lan Tianye	
2020	Fake Princess	山寨小萌主	Li Che	
2020	My Girl	99分女朋友	Shen Yi	
2020	Love Story of Court Enemies	那江烟花那江雨	Yue Zongli	
2020	Consummation	拾光的秘密	Xia Shi	
2021	Sweet Sweet	住我对面的小哥哥	Su Mu	
2024	Debit Queen	小财迷	Xu Zilu	
2025	The Comic Bang	月刊少女	Gu Zhengxing	
TBA	Zhaoge	朝歌	Long Zi	
TBA	Fall in Love at Second Sight	一见不倾心	Zou Shuwu	
TBA	100 Reasons Not To Be King	不当皇帝的100个理由	Prince Yu	
TBA	Way To Romance	对着月亮说爱你	Zhang Xiaojun	
TBA	The Wanderers	火星孤儿	Ye Wen	
