= Addy Lee =

Malaysian hairstylist

- Born: 2 May 1971 (age 55); Penang, Malaysia
- Occupations: Hairstylist; businessman
- Relatives: Eleanor Lee (goddaughter)

Chinese name
- Traditional Chinese: 李榮達
- Simplified Chinese: 李荣达
- Hanyu Pinyin: Lǐ Róngdá
- Jyutping: Lei5 Wing4 Daat6
- Hokkien POJ: Lí Êng-ta̍t

Addy Lee Eng-tat (born 2 May 1971) is a Malaysian celebrity hairstylist and businessman who is based in Singapore and China. He left his hometown in Malaysia in 1984, at the age of 13, to pursue a childhood dream in Singapore. Lee is currently semi-retired and has relocated to Thailand.

== Life and career ==
Lee was the youngest son of a grocery shop owner. In his young mind, he had just wished to work in an air-conditioned workplace where he didn't have to sweat and with nice clothes to wear.

In 1990, at the age of 19, he left his hometown in Penang, Malaysia and went to Singapore. For three years, he moved from one hair salon to another, gaining work experience in both the creative art of hairdressing and the competencies of running a hair salon business. Lee is, today a famed name in Singapore.

He has worked on his portfolio on from TV, print commercials, hairshows, seminars workshops and local artistes like Michelle Chia, Joanne Peh, Quan Yi Fong, Mark Lee, Bryan Wong and more.

Lee has opened salons in Singapore and Malaysia, and the Monsoon Hair Academy in January 2007 to coach trainees who wish to establish a career in the hairdressing and hairstyling.

Besides working as a hair stylist, Lee also did live-stream sales in China.

In 2014, Lee, with television hosts Quan Yifeng and Vivian Lai, set up the social media and production company 3x Media Production.

In September 2021, Lee started a live-stream company, Mdada, with business partners and friends Pornsak and Michelle Chia to sell products on Facebook Live.

== Personal life ==
Lee is the godfather of Eleanor Lee, daughter of host Quan Yifong, who took on his surname.
