= A Life Time Love =

- Drama poster
- Also known as: Once Promised; Ancient Love Song
- Genre: Fantasy; Romance
- Based on: Once Promised by Tong Hua
- Written by: Rao Jun
- Directed by: Cai Changsheng
- Starring: Huang Xiaoming; Victoria Song; Sheng Yilun; Zhang Li
- Country of origin: China
- Original language: Mandarin
- No. of episodes: 54

Production
- Executive producers: Fang Ying; Bai Tianshi
- Producer: Zhao Yifang
- Production locations: Xiangshan Film City; Hengdian World Studios
- Running time: 45 minutes
- Production companies: Croton Media; Gcoo Entertainment

Original release
- Network: Dragon TV
- Release: 12 June – 7 August 2017

A Life Time Love (Chinese: 上古情歌; pinyin: Shang Gu Qing Ge) is a 2017 Chinese television series starring Huang Xiaoming, Victoria Song, Sheng Yilun and Zhang Li. It is adapted from the xianxia novel Once Promised (Chinese: 曾许诺; pinyin: Ceng Xu Nuo) by Tong Hua. The series aired via Dragon TV from 12 June to 7 August 2017.

== Synopsis ==
The story takes place in a mythological world with demons, gods, and humans cohabiting, set during the Three Sovereigns and Five Emperors period. The world is split into three kingdoms - Xuan Yang, Ling Yun and Xuan Mu.

Chi Yun is a war god from Ruo Jiang Tribe, a wild beast-turned-man driven by revenge, who wants to dominate and unite all living things under one ruler. His resolve is immovable until he meets Muqing Mo, a princess from the Xuan Yang Kingdom. However, Muqing Mo is betrothed by her family to Prince Sheng Lun from the Ling Yun Kingdom. Nonetheless, her heart belongs to Chi Yun. The two made a promise to meet annually under the peach blossoms of No Return Valley, where Chi Yun made Muqing Mo a promise of love, that he will give up everything, and stay by her side for the rest of their lives.

Complications arise when Ah Mo's father invades Ruo Jiang in order to attain world domination. Torn between family and love, Ah Mo is forced to make some difficult choices when her kingdom clashes with Ruo Jiang numerous times, resulting in world chaos.

== Cast ==
=== Main ===
- Huang Xiaoming as chain cloud
  - A beast god who lived in the wild. Intelligent, courageous and invincible on the battlefield, Chi Yun is known as Ruo Jiang's God of War. He is sincere and unwavering toward his love for Muqing Mo. He becomes Hao Xu's sworn brother and helps him when he ascends the throne as Xuan Mu's emperor after his father's death.
- Victoria Song as Muqing Mo / Xuanyang Ruo
  - Princess of Xuan Yang kingdom. Intelligent, kind and pure, she is a highly skilled healer who wishes nothing but world peace. She is forced to marry Lingyun Sheng Lun, but her heart belongs only to chain cloud
- Sheng Yilun as Lingyun Sheng Lun
  - Prince of Ling Yun kingdom, who is known for both his looks and talent. He is cold and indifferent, wanting nothing else but to make Ling Yun the most powerful kingdom. He has an arranged marriage with Muqing Mo, but vows to only treat it as a form of alliance. He ends up falling for Muqing Mo, but values his ambition over his love for her.
- Zhang Li as Yun Sang
  - Elder princess of the Xuan Mu kingdom. Childhood friend of Muqing Mo. She is gentle, understanding, wise, and loyal toward love and friendship. She fell in love with Jing Shi, but their relationship goes through many hurdles. In the end, to create an alliance and stop war, she marries Xuanyang Yu Chen who is already dead.

=== Supporting ===
==== Xuan Yang ====
- Zhang Shuangli as King of Xuan Yang
- Xi Yuli as Muqing Liao Ruo
  - Queen of Xuan Yang. She is close childhood friends with the King of Xuan Mu and Madam Yu, and was in love with the King of Xuan Mu.
- Lin Jing as Can Leishi
  - Concubine of the King of Xuan Yang. Proud and arrogant, she would do anything to protect her sons, and help them rise to power.
- Zhai Tianlin as Xuanyang Yu Chen
  - Eldest prince of Xuan Yang. A warrior with both strength and wits, he is well respected as a leader among his peers. Despite being at odds with Sheng Lun politically, the two became the best of friends.
    He was later killed after being poisoned by his younger brother Jie Yi and was greatly wounded by Chi Yun. His death is kept a secret by Muqing Mo and Sheng Lun to protect his mother and brother.
- Xiao Xiaobai as Xuanyang Hui
  - Third prince of Xuan Yang. Can Leishi's son. He is extremely competitive and constantly tries to one-up Yu Chen. He later died in a battle between Xuan Yang and Xuan Mu.
- Luo Yunxi as Xuanyang Zhi Ruo
  - Fourth prince of Xuan Yang. A refined gentleman who is also bold and hot-blooded. He is very close to his sister, Muqing Mo and would do anything to protect his family. He falls in love with Yi Li and marries her. He later died in the battlefield due to a scheme.
- Pu Kang as Xuanyang Jie Yi
  - Ninth prince of Xuan Yang. Can Leishi's son. He grew up together with Muqing Mo, and despite having different mothers, shared a close relationship with her. However, he eventually plots against his half-siblings for the throne. He is the one who poisoned Yu Chen and forced Muqing Mo to kill him in return.
- Janice Wu as Yi Li
  - Leader of She River tribe, who possesses extraordinary martial arts and assassination skills. She is generous, unrestrained and passionate. She falls in love with Zhi Ruo and marries him. She later committed suicide after trying to take revenge for her husband.
- Liu Fanfei as Zi Zhu
  - A puppet created by Yu Chen, who later comes to life and falls in love with him.
- Yang Siyuan as Chi Mo
- Si Yuan as Ye Bin
- Lu Jiahao as An Hua
- Sun Boyang as Chen Fang
- Guo Jin as Hai Xiong
  - Lieutenant of Xuanyang Hui. He was saved by Yu Chen and becomes a wise general of Xuanyang.
- Jin Jin as Huai Xu
  - A maid sent by Yu Chen to stay by Muqing Mo's side after her marriage.

==== Ling Yun ====
- Li Jingrong as King of Ling Yun
- Gao Ningning as Queen of Ling Yun
- Chen Kaixuan as Di Yin
  - Second prince of Ling Yun. An ambitious man who seeks to destroy Sheng Lun's power, and attempted multiple times to kill him and destroy his reputation.
- Cui Hang as Han Yan
  - Third prince of Ling Yun. He is aligned with Di Yin.
- He Jiaxuan as Jian You
  - Eighth prince of Ling Yun. A man with an innocent nature, he is also an avid supporter of Sheng Lun.
- Shen Tai as Jing Shi
  - Great general of Ling Yun and Sheng Lun's right hand man. He falls in love with Yun Sang.
- Hao Zejia as Qi Nu
  - A woman who loves Jing Shi, and would do anything for him. She ultimately ends up being used by Di Yin and ruined the marriage between Yun Sang and Jing Shi.

==== Xuan Mu ====
- Hou Changrong as King of Xuan Mu
  - A kind and benevolent ruler with extraordinary healing skills. He gives the book "Xuan Mu's Hundred Grass Collection" to Muqing Mo, unofficially dubbing her his apprentice. He died due to his deteriorating health.
- Lin Shijie as Hao Xu
  - Prince of Xuan Mu. A gentle and refined man who is a good healer. After his father's death, he ascends the throne with the help of his elder sister Yun Sang and his sworn brother Chi Yun. He later died in the hands of Tong Zheng.
- Gao Yuxin as Chang Xi
  - Princess of Xuan Mu. She likes Chi Yun. She later died in the hands of Tong Zheng.
- Liu Shuailiang as Kun Bu
  - Great general of Xuan Mu, who is loyal to his kingdom. He was saved by Muqing Mo when he was bullied as a kid and is grateful toward her.
- Tian Jiada as Tong Zheng
  - Great general of Xuan Mu. Cruel, hot tempered and arrogant, he is Chi Yun's biggest rival and would stop at nothing to attain power. He frames the King of Xuan Yang for killing Hao Xu when he is the one who truly killed him.
- Li Xinzhe as Xing Mang
  - Great general of Xuan Mu. He is fiercely loyal to the King of Xuan Mu, and is not wavered by Tong Zheng's bribery. He was killed by Tong Zheng.
- Li Xinze as Ju Ze
  - General of Xuan Mu. He is aligned with Tong Zheng.

==== Others ====
- Zhuge Chengcheng as Madam Yu
  - Childhood friend of Liao Ruo and King of Xuan Mu. She held a torch for the King of Xuan Mu since young. She is also the owner of the Jade Mountain.
- Kuang Can as Xuan Yi
- Molly Han as Yu
- Wang Zixuan as Ye Feng
  - Chi Yun's comrade, who aids him in Xuan Mu's war against Xuan Yang.
- Chen Saisai as Qing He
- Li Nini as Nuo Su
  - Chi Yun and Muqing Mo's daughter.
- Ye Shengtong as Luo Yao
- Jiang Ziyan as Lie Yang
  - A heavenly bird sent by Chi Yun to Muqing Mo, who later tamed it and adopted as a pet.
- Li Jianxin as Storyteller
- Bai Dongfeng as Wizard King
  - A highly skilled healer of Ruo Jiang.
- He Miao as Yan Hao
  - Apprentice of the Wizard King.

All the names and places from the novel have been changed to avoid breaching the regulations of SARFT.

== Production ==
The series is inspired from the classical novel Classic of Mountains and Seas.

The series is reportedly the first drama in China to make use of the Previzion (visual camera) to achieve real-time imaging. The technique received the Emmy Award for Engineering. It also uses the combination of Bionic mechanical model and MSC digital special effects to construct the animated creatures in the series. It was filmed at Xiangshan Film City and Hengdian World Studios over a period of 288 days.

== Soundtrack ==
No.	Title	Lyrics	Music	Singer	Length
1.	"Peach Blossom Promise (桃花諾)" (Theme song)	Zhang Ying	Luo Kun	G.E.M.
2.	"Gazing into a Thousand Years (一望千年)"	Lin Qiao	Jin Dachuan	Jin Zhiwen
3.	"Little End of the World (小小天涯)"	Zhang Ying	Luo Kun	Yisa Yu
4.	"Book in the Clouds (雲中書)"	Gan Shijia	Bae Lin	Bae Lin
5.	"An Ancient Promise (上古之诺)"	Liu Jiaze, Li Tianyang	Sheng Yu	Chou Chuan-huing
6.	"Returning Swallows (归燕)"	Xiao Ya	Chen Chao	Ayanga
7.	"Mountain Song (山歌)"		Chen Chao	Xiao Jie, Liu Fang

== Ratings ==
- Highest ratings are marked in red, lowest ratings are marked in blue

Episode #	Original broadcast date	Average audience share (CSM52)		Average audience share (National Average)		Ranking in timeslot
Episode #	Original broadcast date	Ratings	Audience share	Ratings	Audience share	Ranking in timeslot
1-3	June 12, 2017	0.57	3.711	0.15	1.22	2
4-6	June 13, 2017	0.486	2.861	0.13	0.97	2
7-9	June 19, 2017	0.577	3.678	0.16	1.24	2
10-12	June 20, 2017	0.674	4.171	0.16	1.22	2
13-15	June 26, 2017	0.653	4.104	0.19	1.42	2
16-18	June 27, 2017	0.766	4.481	0.17	1.19	2
19-21	July 3, 2017	0.7	4.122	0.17	1.21	2
22-24	July 4, 2017	0.712	4.209	0.18	1.27	2
25-27	July 10, 2017	0.649	3.717	0.2	1.34	2
28-30	July 11, 2017	0.73	4.191	0.16	1.1	2
31-33	July 17, 2017	0.737	4.184	0.2	1.31	2
34-36	July 18, 2017	0.857	5.141	0.2	1.42	2
37-39	July 24, 2017	0.721	4.355	0.15	1.1	2
40-42	July 25, 2017	0.747	4.796	0.18	1.38	2
43-45	July 31, 2017	0.622	4.924	0.17	1.18	2
46-48	August 1, 2017	0.175	2.377	-	-	3
49-54	August 7, 2017	0.491	3.247	0.13	1.04	2
Average		0.636	4	-	-	-
