= Wait, My Youth =

- Genre: Life; Romance
- Written by: Tiantian Qian
- Directed by: Qinyuan Shen
- Starring: Li Jiaqi, Zhao Yiqin
- Composer: Dong Dong-Dong
- Country of origin: China
- Original language: Mandarin
- No. of episodes: 24

Production
- Producer: Wang Jian
- Running time: 45 mins

Original release
- Network: Youku
- Release: March 27 – May 18, 2019

Wait, My Youth (Chinese: 等等我的青春; pinyin: Děng děng wǒ de qīngchūn) is a 2019 Chinese television series starring Zhao Yiqin, Li Jiaqi, Li Ge Yang, Leo Dong, Stephanie Xu, and Vincent Wei. The drama was aired on Youku Original Network from March 2019 to April 18, 2019.

== Synopsis ==
Wait, My Youth is a story about warmth of family, friendship, and love. This story mainly revolves around the love and friendship of Su Cancan. She initially has a secret crush on her classmate Lin Jia Ze but soon falls in love with his best friend, Lan Tian Ye.

== Cast ==
=== Main ===
Actor	Character Name	Description
Zhao Yiqin	Lan Tianye	Tall, cold, and handsome, the top student who always sleeps in class. He loves playing the guitar and eventually joined the Radio Club with Lin Jiaze. Became deskmate with Su Cancan and secretly fell in love with her.
Li Jiaqi	Su Cancan	A kind and innocent girl, she is secretly in love with Lin Jiaze, the most handsome boy in high school, but never confessed her feelings. She become deskmates with Lan Tianye in second year and has a different spark with him.

=== Supporting ===
Actor	Character Name	Description
Li Ge Yang	Lin Jiaze	The most handsome boy in high school. Top student in class and excels in piano. Su Cancan has a crush on him from junior high to college. He is best friends with Lan Tianye.
Stephanie Xu (Xu Mengyuan)	Xu Meili	Su Cancan's best friend since high school. She becomes Tang Xingyi's girlfriend in college and later become his wife.
Leo Dong (Dong Yanlei)	Tang Xingyi	Lan Tian Ye's college roommate. Addicted to online games, where he met Xu Meili and eventually fall in love with her.
Wu Shuangyi	Tao Yi Ting	School goddess and also Su Cancan's cousin. Top student in high school and excels with the cello. Received many love letters and secret admirers but set her eye on the Music teacher, Lin Zhou. Eventually a successful lawyer in Beijing.
Vincent Wei	Lin Zhou	Music teacher in high school who created the Radio Station Club and recruited Lin Jia Ze, Lan Tian Ye, Su Cancan, and Xu Mei Li.

== Soundtrack ==
No.	Title	Singer	Length
1.	"Occasionally" (偶爾)	Xin Ge Ge & Momo Zhang Xinlei & Xi Xi	2:55
2.	"Wait My Youth" (等等啊我的青春)	Victor Wong	3:43
3.	"Cotton Candy" (棉花糖)	Stella Seah	3:18
4.	"Find Your Way Home"	Zhang Yi Hao	2:54
5.	"Find Your Way Home"	Zhang Yi Hao	4:01
6.	"Further In The Distance" (更遠的遠方)	Bai Jing Chem & Wang Wen Ting	3:59
7.	"Good thing" (大好事)	Zhang Yi Hao	3:56
8.	"Time Flies" (时光荏苒)	Lovmu	4:01
9.	"Happiness Is Here" (幸福在這里)	Hinson Chou	4:18
10.	"Adventurer" (冒險家)		3:41
