= Damyns Hall Aerodrome =

Airfield in Havering, East London, England

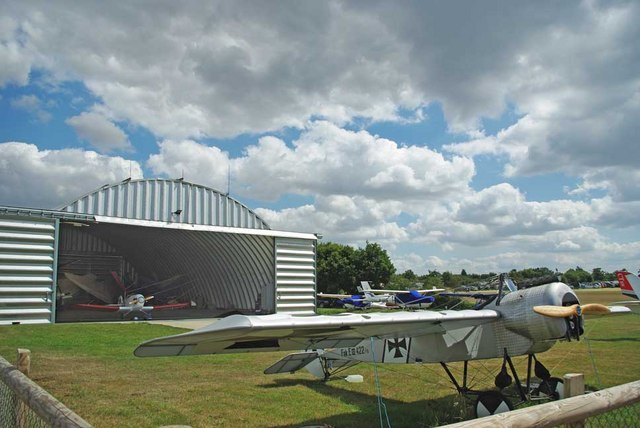
- IATA: none; ICAO: EGML

Summary
- Airport type: Private
- Owner: Timothy Lyons
- Operator: Damyns Hall Aerodrome
- Location: Upminster
- Elevation AMSL: 56 ft / 17 m
- Coordinates: 51°31′43″N 000°14′44″E
- Website: www.damynshall.co.uk

Map
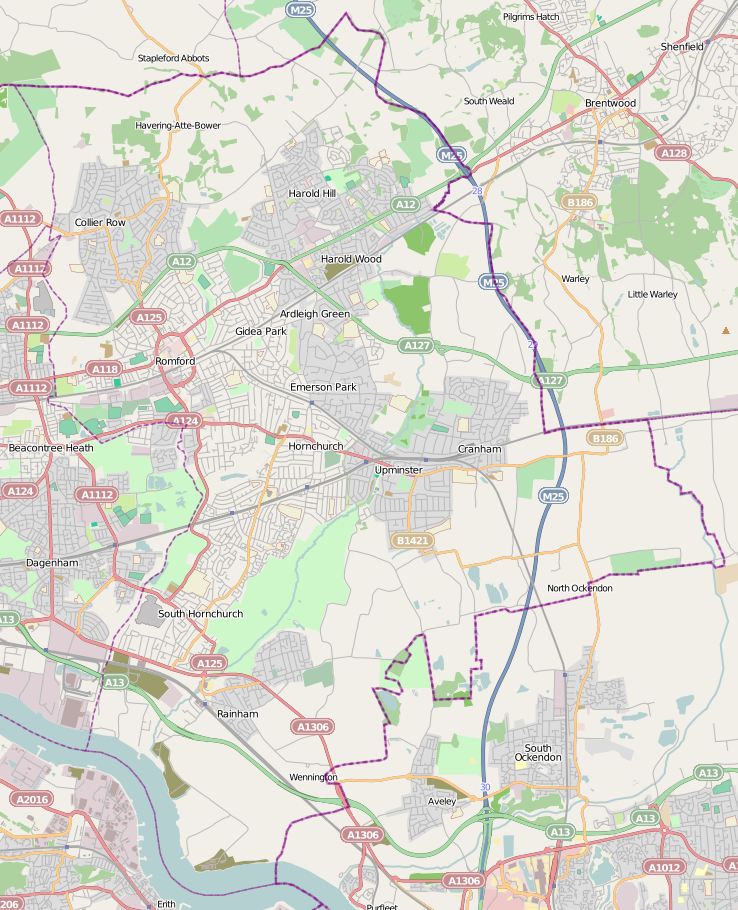
- Location in Havering, Near M25 and A13

Runways
Direction	Length		Surface
Direction	m	ft	Surface
03/21	650	2,133	Grass
14/32*	n/a*	n/a*
- Sources: Damyns Hall Aerodrome: The 14/32 RWY is no longer used for TO's / LDG's but may be used for other operations.

Damyns Hall Aerodrome (ICAO: EGML) is an operational general aviation training and experience aerodrome 2 nautical miles (3.7 km; 2.3 mi) south of Upminster in the London Borough of Havering, England and slightly closer to Aveley to its south. It has around 100 acres of grassland and is owned and operated by Damyns Hall Aerodrome Limited.

== Status, services and amenities ==
Damyns Hall is an unlicensed airfield, which means commercial public transport passenger flights are prohibited, and flying training must take place in aircraft below a certain weight. London Airsports is the main business occupying the site, operating a fleet of microlight aircraft for training and experience flights.

Its hangars house many vintage and modern sport aircraft. It has a café with a garden viewing area open to the general public.

The aerodrome has an air/ground radio service as "Hornchurch Radio" on 119.550 MHz.

== Events past and present ==
From 2013 to 2019, Damyns Hall was the main fields for We Are FSTVL, an award-winning electronic music festival. Typically set during the May bank holiday each year, the event welcomed thousands of festival goers. The location of the festival was changed to Central Park, Dagenham for 2021.

The aerodrome grounds hosted annually in early August the Essex HMVA Military and Flying Machines Show until 2017, when it moved to the east of the county in Rettendon, and changed to Echoes of History Show, still run by the Essex Historic Military Vehicle Association.

== See also ==
- Airports of London - Wikipedia
