= List of teen dramas =

Teen dramas are dramatic television series with a major focus on teenage characters. Some shows on this list are also comedy dramas.

== Argentina ==
- 1/2 falta (2005–06), Canal Trece
- Aliados (2013–14), Telefe
- Alma pirata (2006), Telefe
- Atracción x4 (2008–09), Canal Trece
- La banda del golden rocket (1991–93), Canal Trece
- BIA (2019–20), Disney Channel Latin America
- Bichos raros (2018), TPA
- Casi ángeles (2007–10), Telefe
- Clave de sol (1987–90), Canal Trece
- Días de gallos (2021–23), HBO Max
- EnAmorArte (2001), Telefe
- Frecuencia 04 (2004), Telefe
- Go! Live Your Way (2019), Netflix
- Heidi, bienvenida a casa (2017–19), Nickelodeon Latin America
- Intertwined (2021–23), Disney+
- Kally's Mashup (2017–19), Nickelodeon Latin America
- Melody (2023), Amazon Prime Video
- O11CE (2017–19), Disney XD Latin America
- O11CE: New Generation (2026–present), Disney+
- Paraíso rock (2005), Canal 9
- Playback: Together We Are One (2025–present), Disney+
- Presentes (2012–15), Encuentro
- Rebelde Way (2002–03), Canal 9
- El refugio (de los sueños) (2006), Canal Trece
- Rincón de luz (2003), Canal 9
- Romeo y Julieta (2008), Canal 9
- Secrets of Summer (2022), Netflix
- Selenkay (2024–present), Disney Channel Latin America, Disney+
- Socorro, quinto año (1990), Canal 9
- Soy Luna (2016–18), Disney Channel Latin America
- Soy Luna: Let's Roll Again (2026–present), Disney+
- Sueña conmigo (2010–11), Nickelodeon Latin America
- Tierra Incognita (2022–23), Disney+
- Verano del '98 (1998–2000), Telefe

== Armenia ==
- Alien (2017), Shant TV
- Ellen's Diary (2017–19), Shant TV

== Australia ==
- Bad Behaviour (2023), Stan
- Barracuda (2016), ABC
- Blue Water High (2005–08), ABC
- Boy Swallows Universe (2024), Netflix
- Bump (2021–24), Stan
- Castaway (2010), Seven Network
- Class of '74 (1974–75), Seven Network
- Crash Zone (1999–2001), Seven Network
- Crazy Fun Park (2023), ABC Me
- Cybergirl (2001–02), Network Ten
- Dance Academy (2010–13), ABC1, ABC3
- Dead Gorgeous (2010), ABC1, ABC3
- Dive Club (2021), 10 Shake
- Double Trouble (2008), ABC3
- The Elephant Princess (2008–11), Network Ten
- Eugénie Sandler P.I. (2000), ABC
- Fatty & George (1981), ABC
- First Day (2020–22), ABC Me
- Flunk (2018–present), YouTube
- Foreign Exchange (2004), Nine Network
- The Girl From Tomorrow (1990), Nine Network
- The Girl From Tomorrow Part II: Tomorrow's End (1993), Nine Network
- The Genie from Down Under (1996–98), ABC
- Grace Beside Me (2018), NITV
- Gymnastics Academy: A Second Chance! (2022), Netflix
- headLand (2005–06), Seven Network
- Heartbreak High (1994–99), Network Ten, ABC
- Heartbreak High (2022–26), Netflix
- The Heights (2019–20), ABC
- The Henderson Kids (1985–87), Network Ten
- Holly's Heroes (2005), Nine Network
- The Hunting (2019), SBS
- Invisible Boys (2025–present), Stan
- Itch (2019–21), ABC iView, ABC Me
- Lightning Point (2012), Network Ten
- The Lost Islands (1976), Network Ten
- Mako: Island of Secrets (2013–16), Network Ten, Eleven
- MaveriX (2022), ABC Me
- Minty (1998), ABC
- Mirror, Mirror (1995), Network Ten
- Mirror, Mirror II (1997–98), Network Ten
- More Than This (2022), Paramount+
- Mustangs FC (2017–20), ABC Me
- My Great Big Adventure (2012), ABC3
- Neighbours: Erinsborough High (2019), 10 Play
- The New Legends of Monkey (2018–20), ABC Me
- The New Tomorrow (2005), Seven Network
- Noah and Saskia (2004), ABC
- Nowhere Boys (2013–18), ABC3
- Ocean Girl (1994–98), Network Ten
- Out There (2003–04), ABC
- Outriders (2001), ABC3
- Parallax (2004), ABC, Nine Network
- Puberty Blues (2012–14), Network Ten
- Ready for This (2015), ABC3
- The Restless Years (1977–81), Ten Network
- Rock Island Mysteries (2022–24), 10 Shake, Nickelodeon
- The Saddle Club (2001–09), ABC1, Nine Network
- Sam Fox: Extreme Adventures (2014), Eleven
- Ship to Shore (1993–96), ABC, Nine Network
- Short Cuts (2001–02), ABC3
- Silversun (2004), ABC
- Sky Trackers (1990–94), Seven Network
- SLiDE (2011), Fox8
- Snobs (2003), Nine Network
- Soundtrack to Our Teenage Zombie Apocalypse (2022), ABC Me
- Spellbinder (1995), Nine Network
- Spellbinder: Land of the Dragon Lord (1997), Nine Network
- Stormworld (2009), Nine Network
- Streetsmartz (2005–06), Nine Network
- Surviving Summer (2022–23), Netflix
- Sweat (1996), Network Ten
- Thou Shalt Not Steal (2024), Stan
- Thunderstone (1999–2000), Network Ten
- Time Trackers (2008), Seven Network
- Tomorrow When the War Began (2016), ABC3
- Trapped (2008–09), Seven Network
- Turn Up the Volume (2023), ABC Me
- The Unlisted (2019), ABC Me
- Wicked Science (2004–06), Network Ten
- Year Of (2023), Stan

== Bangladesh ==
- BnG (2022–24), Bongo
- Happy Lodge (2019), Boishakhi TV

== Belgium ==
- The Bank Hacker (2021), Streamz
- The Coyotes (2021), La Une
- Ghost Rockers (2014–17), Ketnet
- High Tides (2023–26), VRT, Netflix
- Kids on the Block (2023), Ketnet
- Meisjes (2020–23), Ketnet
- Hawa en Adam (2024–present), Ketnet
- Hilly Skate (2023), Ketnet
- Hoodie (2020–22), VRT
- Hotel Beau Séjour (2017–21), Eén
- LikeMe (2019–23), Ketnet
- Putain (2024–25), Streamz
- Skam France/Belgique (2018–23), La Trois, France 4, france.tv
- Spitsbroers (2015–17), VTM
- Spring (2002–08), VRT
- WtFOCK (2018–21), VIER, Play5, GoPlay, Streamz

== Brazil ==
- 3% (2016–20), Netflix
- All the Same... or Not (2022–23), Disney+
- Amigas & Rivais (2007–08), SBT
- Aruna's Magic (2023), Disney+
- Back to 15 (2022–24), Netflix
- Blood Red – Under the Moonlight (2025–present), Globoplay
- Confissões de Adolescente (1994–96), TV Cultura
- Divided Youth (2024), Max
- Galera (2003–04), TV Cultura
- Juacas (2017–19), Disney Channel Brazil
- Killer Vacation (2023), Star+
- Kissing Game (2020), Netflix
- Malhação (1995–2020), Rede Globo
- Mila in the Multiverse (2023–24), Disney+, Disney Channel Brazil
- My Magic Closet (2023), Max
- Pedro & Bianca (2012–14), TV Cultura
- Rebelde (2011–12), RecordTV
- Sintonia (2019–25), Netflix
- Spectros (2020), Netflix
- Summer Heat (2022), Netflix
- Teenage Kiss: The Future Is Dead (2023), Max
- Tudo o Que É Sólido Pode Derreter (2009), TV Cultura
- Z4 (2018), Disney Channel Brazil, SBT

== Bulgaria ==
- Apartament 404 (2016–17), Vbox7
- Az sŭm izi (2020), Vbox7
- #KIFLA (2016), Vbox7
- Kilerŭt (2018–19), Vbox7
- Ne taka brat! (2016–18), Vbox7
- Pŭzel: Pokhiteni (2018), Vbox7
- Revolution Z: Sex, Lies and Music (2012–14), BTV
- Sledvaĭ me (2017–19), Vbox7
- Sofiya – den i nosht (2015–19), Nova TV, Kino Nova
- Ubiĭ profesora (2019), Vbox7
- Undercover (2011–16), BNT
- Us, Ours and Yours (2017), Nova TV
- Viral (2019), Vbox7

== Canada ==
- 11 Somerset (2004–05), Télé-Québec, A-Channel
- 15/Love (2004–06), YTV
- 21 Thunder (2017), CBC
- 2030 CE (2002–03), YTV
- Anash and the Legacy of the Sun-Rock (2007), APTN
- Anne with an E (2017–19), CBC
- Astrid & Lilly Save the World (2022), CTV Sci-Fi Channel
- Backstage (2016–17), Family
- The Best Years (2007–09), Global, E!
- Bet (2025–present), Netflix
- Between (2015–16), City, Netflix
- Beyond Black Beauty (2024), Family, Amazon Freevee
- Breaker High (1997–98), YTV
- Crew Girl (2026–present), Netflix
- Dark Oracle (2004–06), YTV
- Degrassi High (1989–91), CBC, PBS
- Degrassi Junior High (1987–89), CBC, PBS
- Degrassi: Next Class (2016–17), Family
- Degrassi: The Next Generation (2001–15), CTV, MUCH, MTV Canada
- Drop the Beat (2000), CBC
- Edgemont (2001–05), CBC
- Endlings (2020–21), CBC
- Fakes (2022), CBC Gem
- Falcon Beach (2006–07), Global, ABC Family
- Finding Her Edge (2025–present), Netflix
- Gangnam Project (2024–present), CBC Gem
- Guinevere Jones (2002), YTV
- The Hardy Boys (2020–23), YTV
- Heartland (2007–present), CBC
- Higher Ground (2000), Fox Family
- Hillside (1991–93), YTV, Nickelodeon
- Holly Hobbie (2018–22), Family
- Homeschooled (2022), CBC Gem
- How to Fail as a Popstar (2023), CBC Gem
- In a Heartbeat (2000–01), Family
- Instant Star (2004–08), CTV
- Jenny (2017–2021), Unis
- Kif-Kif (2006–07), Radio-Canada
- Les Bracelets rouges (2022–24), TVA
- Lost & Found Music Studios (2016–17), Family
- Macy Murdoch (2023–present), CBC Gem
- Madison (1993–97), Global
- Majority Rules! (2009–10), Teletoon
- Mentors (1998–2002), Family
- Monster Warriors (2006–08), YTV
- My Perfect Landing (2020), Family
- My Secret Identity (1988–91), CTV
- Near or Far (2024), CBC Gem
- The Next Step (2013–25), Family, CBC Gem, YTV
- Nomades (2019–20), Ici TOU.TV
- Northwood (1991–94), CBC
- Our Hero (2000–02), CBC
- Les petits rois (2021), Ici TOU.TV
- Near or Far (2024), CBC Gem
- Premier trio (2023–present), Ici TOU.TV
- Radio Free Roscoe (2003–05), Family
- Ready or Not (1993–97), Showtime, Disney Channel, Global
- ReBoot: The Guardian Code (2018), YTV, Netflix
- renegadepress.com (2004–08), APTN
- The Rez (1996–98), CBC
- Ride (2016), YTV
- Ruby and the Well (2022–24), Family
- Spirit Bay (1982–87), CBC
- Still I Rise (2023), Crave
- Straight Up (1996–98), CBC
- Strange Days at Blake Holsey High (2002–06), Global
- Todd and the Book of Pure Evil (2010–12), Space
- Topline (2022), CBC Gem
- Tower Prep (2010), Cartoon Network
- Trickster (2020), CBC
- The Unstoppable Jenny Garcia (2025–present), CBC Gem
- Utopia Falls (2020), CBC Gem
- Vampire High (2001–02), YTV
- Warigami (2019), CBC Gem
- Watatatow (1991–2005), Radio-Canada
- Wayward (2025), Netflix
- Whistler (2006–07), CTV
- The Zack Files (2000–02), YTV

== Chile ==
- 16 (2003), TVN
- 17 (2004), TVN
- Amango (2007–09), Canal 13
- Amores urbanos (2003–04), Mega
- Amor virtual (2010), Chilevisión
- Baby Bandito (2024–present), Netflix
- Bichos raros (2018), TVN
- Bienvenida realidad (2004–05), TVN
- BKN (2004–12), Mega
- El blog de la Feña (2008–09), Canal 13
- Corazón rebelde (2009), Canal 13
- Decibel 110 (2011–12), Mega
- Don diablo (2010), Chilevisión
- EsCool (2005), Mega
- Gordis (2012), Chilevisión
- Índigo (2007–08), Mega
- La jauría (2020), Amazon Prime Video, TVN
- Karkú (2007–09), TVN, Nickelodeon Latin America
- Magi-K (2005–06), Mega
- Más que amigos (2002), Canal 13
- Xfea2 (2004–05), Mega
- Vampiras (2011), Chilevisión
- Zoom, acercate al amor (2003), Mega

== China ==
- 101 Times Confession (2013), Youku
- Accidentally in Love (2018), Tencent Video, Mango TV
- Addicted (2016), iQIYI
- All About Secrets (2017), iQIYI
- Always Home (2025), Tencent Video
- Back in Time (2014), Sohu TV
- Basketball Fever (2018), iQIYI
- Blazing Teens (2006–07), Youku, Bilibili
- Beautiful Time with You (2020), Mango TV
- The Best of You in My Mind (2020), Youku
- Beyond Light Years (2018), Youku
- Boyhood (2017–26), Hunan TV, Mango TV
- Campus Beauty (2016), Sohu TV
- The Chang'an Youth (2020), Tencent Video, Mango TV
- Chasing Ball (2019), iQIYI
- Cherish Our Love Forever (1998), CCTV
- Closer to You (2020–23), Youku
- The Comic Bang (2025), iQIYI
- The Day I Skipped School for You (2018–20), iQIYI
- Dear Prince (2017), Sohu TV, Mango TV
- The Demon Master (2018–19), Tencent Video, Mango TV
- Dive (2019), Youku
- Don't Disturb My Study (2021), Hunan TV, Mango TV
- Double Love (2022), iQIYI
- The Endless Love (2017), Hunan TV
- A Female Student Arrives at the Imperial College (2021), Tencent Video, Youku
- Finding Soul (2016), LeTV
- First Love (2022), iQIYI
- First Romance (2020), Youku
- Flourish in Time (2021), Tencent Video
- The Four Horsemen (2015), iQIYI
- Gardenia Blossom 2017 (2017), Sohu TV
- Genius Girlfriend (2026), iQIYI
- Give Me a Chick at 18 (2018), Youku
- Go Go Squid! (2019–21), ZJTV, Dragon TV
- Growing Pain (2019–22), Hunan TV
- The Heart of Genius (2022), CCTV, iQIYI
- Hello Debate Opponent (2019–21), Mango TV
- Hello, My Youth (2021), Youku
- Hello My Girl (2022), iQIYI
- Hello, The Sharpshooter (2022), Tencent Video
- Hidden Love (2023), Youku
- I Won't Get Bullied by Girls (2018), Youku
- Just an Encore (2019), Tencent Video
- The Left Ear (2023), Youku
- Lighter & Princess (2022), Youku
- A Little Love Song (2019), iQIYI
- A Little Reunion (2019), ZJTV, Dragon TV
- A Little Thing Called First Love (2019), Hunan TV
- Lookism (2019), Tencent Video
- The Love Equations (2020), Tencent Video
- A Love for Dilemma (2021), CCTV, Dragon TV, iQIYI
- Love O2O (2016), JSTV, Dragon TV
- A Love So Beautiful (2017), Tencent Video
- Lovely Us (2020), iQIYI
- Master Devil Do Not Kiss Me (2017), Tencent Video
- Memory of Encaustic Tile (2022), Youku
- Meteor Garden (2018), Hunan TV
- Meteor Shower (2009–10), Hunan TV
- Mr. Bodyguard (2015–16), iQIYI
- My Classmate From Far Far Away (2018), iQIYI
- My Huckleberry Friends (2017–18), iQIYI
- My Little Princess (2016), Sohu TV
- My Sunshine (2015), Dragon TV, JSTV, iQIYI
- Nervous (2017), Tencent Video
- The Oath of Love (2022), Hunan TV, Tencent Video
- Operation Love (2017), Dragon TV
- One and a Half Summer (2014), Dragon TV
- Please Class Mate (2021), Tencent Video
- The Prince of Tennis (2019), Hunan TV
- Project 17: Side By Side (2019), Tencent Video, Mango TV
- Project 17: Skate Our Souls (2019), Tencent Video, Mango TV
- Put Your Head on My Shoulder (2019), Tencent Video
- Ray of Light (2023), CCTV, Youku
- A River Runs Through It (2021), Youku
- The Rules of Love (2019), iQIYI
- Rules of Zoovenia (2019), Mango TV
- Rush to the Dead Summer (2017), Hunan TV
- The Science of Falling in Love (2023), iQIYI
- Shining for One Thing (2022), iQIYI
- Shining Like You (2021), Tencent Video
- Skate into Love (2020), Jiangsu TV, Zhejiang TV
- Soft Memory (2019), Tencent Video
- Somewhere Only We Know (2019), iQIYI
- Suddenly This Summer (2018), Tencent Video
- Stand by Me (2016–22), Tencent Video, WeTV
- Take My Brother Away (2018), Tencent Video
- Taohua Yuan (2017), LeTV
- Tiger Crane (2023), iQIYI
- Unrequited Love (2019), Tencent Video
- Unrequited Love (2021), Mango TV
- Wait, My Youth (2019), Youku
- Waiting for You in the Future (2019), iQIYI
- When I Fly Towards You (2023), Youku
- When We Were Young (2017), Tencent Video
- Where the Lost Ones Go (2017), Mango TV
- The Whirlwind Girl (2015), Hunan TV
- Wind Blew That Summer (2019), Mango TV
- With You (2016), iQIYI
- You Are a Dead Man, Long Riyi, (2017–18), Tencent Video
- You Are Desire (2023), Mango TV
- "Your Highness", The Class Monitor (2019), Tencent Video
- Youth (2018), iQIYI
- Youth Melody (2021), iQIYI
- Shining for One Thing (2021), iQIYI

== Colombia ==
- Always a Witch (2019–20), Netflix
- Al ritmo de tu corazón (2004), RCN Televisión
- Los Billis (2023), Amazon Prime Video
- Champeta, el ritmo de la Tierra (2025), Disney Channel Latin America
- Chica vampiro (2013), RCN Televisión
- Clase aparte (1994–97), Canal 1
- Cumbia Ninja (2013–15), Fox Latin America
- Eva Lasting (2023–26), Netflix
- Francisco el matemático (1999–2004), RCN Televisión
- Francisco el matemático: Clase 2017 (2017), RCN Televisión
- Hermosa niña (1998), Canal 1
- It Was Always Me (2022–24), Disney+
- The Low Tone Club (2023), Disney+
- Mamá también (2013–14), RCN Televisión
- Noobees (2018–20), Nickelodeon Latin America
- Popland! (2011), MTV Latin America
- Salcedo, Leather, and Boogaloo (2026–present), Netflix
- The Queen of Flow (2018–present), Caracol Televisión
- The Road to Love (2019), Caracol Televisión
- Toni, la Chef (2015), Nickelodeon Latin America
- Yo soy Franky (2015), Nickelodeon Latin America

== Denmark ==
- Alle kender Kaiser (2025–present), DR Ultra
- Akavet (2020–22), DR Ultra
- Chosen (2022), Netflix
- Dark Horse (2024), TV 2
- Elves (2021), Netflix
- En for holdet (2021–23), DR Ultra
- Er du på (2021), DR Ultra
- Farvel forever (2024), DR Ultra
- Flokken (2020), DR Ultra
- Guilty (2019–22), DR Ultra
- Heartless (2014–15), Kanal 5
- One of the Boys (2023), Viaplay
- Over Grænsen (2020–21), DR Ultra
- Kamikaze (2021), HBO Max
- Klassen (2016–present), DR Ultra
- Limbo (2012–14), DR1
- Mabinooz (2023), DR Ultra
- Natten til lørdag (2019), DR3
- Nordland '99 (2022), DR1
- Pendlerkids (2012–14), DR Ramasjang, DR Ultra
- Puls (2020–21), TV 2 Play
- The Rain (2018–20), Netflix
- Replay (2019), DR Ultra
- Sløborn (2020–24), HBO Nordic, HBO Max
- Stikker (2020), DR Ultra
- Ulven kommer (2020), DR1

== Finland ==
- All the Best Girls (2022–present), Viaplay, Ruutu
- Bull by the Horns (2021), Elisa Viihde
- Critical Point (2023), Yle Areena
- How to Kill a Bull (1989), Yle TV2
- Jag kommer (2020), Yle Areena
- Kakarat (2020–23), Yle Areena
- Larppi (2026–present), Yle Areena
- Limbo (2023–24), Yle Areena
- #lovemilla (2013–14), Yle TV2
- Lovi (2021), Yle Areena
- Luuserit (2020–23), Yle Areena
- Räjähdysherkkä (2023–present), Yle Areena
- Royalty (2026–present), Yle Areena
- Sekasin (2016–21), Yle Areena
- Sneakermania (2026–present), Yle Areena
- Sori siitä (2024), Yle Areena
- Tutkapari (2026–present), Yle Areena
- Tuurenmäki 98 (2024), Elisa Viihde

== France ==
- The 7 Lives of Lea (2022), Netflix
- 9.3 BB (2024), France.tv Slash
- About Sasha (2022), France.tv Slash, France 5
- Askip, le collège se la raconte (2020–present), Okoo
- Ben et Thomas (2008), France 4
- Les Bracelets rouges (2018–20), TF1
- Les Bracelets rouges: Nouvelle génération (2023–24), TF1
- Campus Drivers (2026–present), Amazon Prime Video
- Chante! (2008–11), France 2
- Clash (2012), France 2
- Clem (2010), TF1
- Code Lyoko: Evolution (2013), France 4
- La colo (2025–present), Okoo
- Déter (2023–24), France.tv Slash
- La fille au cœur de cochon (2022), France.tv Slash
- Find Me in Paris (2018–20), France Télévisions
- Girlsquad (2021), France.tv Slash
- Happiness (2021–present), Arte, YouTube
- Des jours meilleurs (2017–18), France 4
- Karma, trop jeunes pour se taire (2026–present), France.tv
- L'Internat (2009), M6
- Louis 28 (2023), France.tv Slash
- Lycée alpin (1992), France 2
- Marie Antoinette (2022–present), Canal+
- Mental (2019–21), France.tv Slash
- Mortel (2019–21), Netflix
- Nos vies en l'air (2024), France.tv Slash
- Parallels (2022), Disney+
- Résistance (2014), TF1
- Seconde B (1993–95), France 2
- Skam France/Belgique (2018–23), France 4, La Trois, France.tv Slash
- Spellbound (2023–24), France Télévisions
- Stalk (2020), France.tv Slash
- Vampires (2020), Netflix
- Voltaire High (2021), Amazon Prime Video
- Yas & Rim (2018), YouTube
- Young Millionaires (2025–present), Netflix
- Zonz (2025), France.tv Slash

== Germany ==
- Allein gegen die Zeit (2010–12), KiKa
- Alles Liebe, Annette (2016–17), funk
- Almost Fly (2022), WarnerTV Serie
- Anna (1987), ZDF
- Binny and the Ghost (2013–16), Disney Channel Germany
- Biohackers (2020–21), Netflix
- Clara (1993), ZDF
- Club der roten Bänder (2015–17), VOX
- Country Girls (2017–18), funk
- Dark (2017–20), Netflix
- Dear Vivi (2022), ZDF mediathek
- Die drei !!! (2023), Disney+
- Druck (2018–22), funk
- Euphorie (2025–present), RTL+
- FEELINGS (2023–present), funk
- Find Me in Paris (2018–20), ZDF
- FREAKS (2018), funk
- Girl Cave (2017), funk
- Gute Zeiten, schlechte Zeiten (1992–present), RTL
- Hand aufs Herz (2010–11), Sat.1, sixx
- Home Sweet Rome! (2023), ARD
- Das Haus Anubis (2009–12), Nickelodeon Germany
- Hausen (2020), Sky Atlantic
- Hit and Run (2018), funk
- Hotel 13 (2012–14), Nickelodeon Germany
- How to Sell Drugs Online (Fast) (2019–25), Netflix
- Katakomben (2021), Joyn
- Kitz (2021), Netflix
- Manni, der Libero (1982), ZDF
- Maxton Hall — The World Between Us (2024), Amazon Prime Video
- Mysterium (2021), KiKa
- Oliver Maass (1985), ZDF
- Para – Wir sind King (2021–23), TNT Serie
- Patrik Pacard (1984), ZDF
- Pauline (2024), Disney+ (Star Hub)
- Ron und Tanja (1990), ZDF
- Schattenseite (2025), ARD Mediathek
- Schloss Einstein (1998–present), KiKa
- Die Schule am See (1997–2000), ARD
- Sløborn (2020–24), ZDFneo
- Spellbound (2023–24), ZDF
- Spides (2020), Syfy
- Spotlight (2015), Nickelodeon Germany, Paramount+
- Theodosia (2022), ZDF
- Tribes of Europa (2021), Netflix
- Die Torpiraten (1998), Nickelodeon Germany
- We Are the Wave (2019), Netflix
- Wir Kinder vom Bahnhof Zoo (2021), Amazon Prime Video
- Wishlist (2016–18), funk

== Ghana ==
- Things We Do for Love (2000–04), GTV
- YOLO (2015–19), TV3

== Greece ==
- Milky Way (2023), Mega Channel
- S1ngles (1, 2, 2½, 3) (2004–08), Mega Channel
- Tamam (2014–17), ANT1

== Hong Kong ==
- Agency 24 (1981), Rediffusion Television
- All About Boy'z (2003), Now TV
- Aqua Heroes (2003), TVB
- The Butcher Schoolmaster (1992), Asia Television
- Dressage to Win (2008), TVB
- Forever Young at Heart (2021), TVB
- The Harvest Moon (1990), Asia Television
- Hearts of Fencing (2003), TVB
- I SWIM (2022), ViuTV
- I.Q. 100 (1981), Rediffusion Television
- Left on Read (2023), ViuTV
- Limited Education (2019), ViuTV
- lovesignal (2022), ViuTV
- Love Story 1980 (1980), Rediffusion Television
- My Little Darling (1981), TVB
- Sparks (2023), ViuTV
- The Trio (1981), Rediffusion Television
- We Are the Littles (2020), ViuTV
- We Got Game (2022), ViuTV
- Where Is My 15 Minutes? (2025), ViuTV
- Y2K Series (1999–2012), RTHK
- You Only Live Once (2021), ViuTV

== India ==
- 4 the People (2015–16), Asianet
- AdhaFull (2016–17), DD National
- Amber Girls School (2024), Amazon miniTV
- Autograph (2009–12), Asianet
- Banegi Apni Baat (1993–97), Zee TV
- Best Friends Forever? (2012–13), Channel V India
- Big Girls Don't Cry (2024), Amazon Prime Video
- The Buddy Project (2012–14), Channel V India
- Campus Beats (2023), Amazon miniTV
- Class (2023), Netflix
- Class of 2017 (2017), ALTBalaji
- Class of 2020 (2020), ZEE5, ALTBalaji
- Confessions of an Indian Teenager (2013–14), Channel V India
- Crash Course (2022), Amazon Prime Video
- Crazy Stupid Ishq (2013), Channel V India
- Crushed (2022–24), Amazon miniTV
- CyberSquad (2017), ALTBalaji
- D4 - Get Up and Dance (2016), Channel V India
- Dil Dosti Dilemma (2024), Amazon Prime Video
- Dil Se Dosti (2001), Sony Entertainment Television
- Engga Hostel (2023), Amazon Prime Video
- Flames (2018–19), The Viral Fever
- Friends: Conditions Apply (2014–15), Channel V India
- Garmi (2023), SonyLIV
- Gumrah: End of Innocence (2012–16), Channel V India
- Gutar Gu (2023–present), Amazon miniTV
- Happy Go Lucky (2005), STAR One
- Hello Dollie (2004–05), Star Plus
- Hip Hip Hurray (1998–2001), Zee TV
- Hostel Days (2023), Amazon Prime Video
- Hostel Daze (2019–23), Amazon Prime Video
- Humse Hai Liife (2011–12), Channel V India
- Internet Wala Love (2018–19), Colors TV
- Ishaan: Sapno Ko Awaaz De (2010–11), Disney Channel India
- Ishq Unplugged (2016), Channel V India
- It's Complicated: Relationships Ka Naya Status (2013–14), Channel V India
- Jersey No. 10 (2007–08), SAB TV
- Jhalli Anjali: Ke Tootey Dil Ki Amazing Story (2014), Channel V India
- Just Mohabbat (1996–2000), Sony Entertainment Television
- Kaisi Yeh Yaariaan (2014–18), MTV India, Voot
- Kallikattu Pallikoodam (2009–10), Star Vijay
- Kana Kaanum Kaalangal (2006–13), Star Vijay, Star Vijay Super
- Kana Kaanum Kaalangal (2022–present), Disney+ Hotstar
- Kartika (2004), Hungama TV
- Khelti Hai Zindagi Aankh Micholi (2013–14), Zee TV
- Kota Factory (2019–21), The Viral Fever
- Kyun Hota Hai Pyarrr (2002–04), Star Plus
- Laakhon Mein Ek (2017–19), Amazon Prime Video
- LBW: Love Beyond Wicket (2026–present), JioHotstar
- Mastaangi (2016), Channel V India
- Miley Jab Hum Tum (2008–10), STAR One
- Million Dollar Girl (2014–15), Channel V India
- Mismatched (2020–present), Netflix
- MTV Fanaah (2014–15), MTV India
- MTV Girls on Top (2016), MTV India
- MTV Nishedh (2020–22), MTV India
- MTV Webbed (2013–14), MTV India
- Nadu Center (2025–present), JioHotstar
- Navya (2011–12), Star Plus
- Neev (1990), DD National
- Nisha Aur Uske Cousins (2014–15), Star Plus
- O Gujariya: Badlein Chal Duniya (2014), Channel V India
- P.S. I Hate You (2014), Channel V India
- Paanch 5 Wrongs Make A Right (2013–14), Channel V India
- Princess Dollie Aur Uska Magic Bag (2004–05), STAR One
- Puncch Beat (2019), ALTBalaji
- Pyaar Kii Ye Ek Kahaani (2010–11), STAR One
- Pyaar Tune Kya Kiya (2014–17), Zing
- Pyaar Vyaar and All That (2005), MTV India
- REJCTX (2019–20), ZEE5
- Remix (2004–06), STAR One
- Sabki Laadli Bebo (2009–11), Star Plus
- Sadda Haq (2013–16), Channel V India
- School Days (1997–99), DD National
- Secret Diaries: The Hidden Chapters (2014–15), Channel V India
- Selection Day (2018–19), Netflix
- Sisterhood (2024), Amazon miniTV
- Suvreen Guggal – Topper of The Year (2012–13), Channel V India
- Swim Team (2015–16), Channel V India
- Twist Wala Love (2015), Channel V India
- Warrior High (2015), MTV India
- Yahan Ke Hum Sikandar (2011–13), DD National
- Yeh Hai Aashiqui (2013–16), Bindass
- Yeh Jawani Ta Ra Ri Ri (2014), Channel V India
- Ye Meri Life Hai (2004–05), SET
- Yeh Un Dinon Ki Baat Hai (2017–19), SET
- Ziddi Dil Maane Na (2021–22), Sony SAB
- Ziddi Girls (2025), Amazon Prime Video
- Zindagi Wins (2015), Bindass

== Indonesia ==
- A+ (2023), Amazon Prime Video
- Asmara Gen Z (2024–present), SCTV
- Bastian Steel Bukan Cowok Biasa (2014), RCTI
- Benar-Benar Cinta (2006), SCTV
- iSkul (2012), RCTI
- Jejak Rahasia (2024), SCTV
- Jurnal Risa (2023), Disney+ Hotstar
- Keluarga Cemara: The Series (2022), Disney+ Hotstar
- A Little White Lie (2026), MAXstream
- Lupus: Millennia (1999–2001), Indosiar
- Lupus: The Series (1995–98), Indosiar
- Melukis Senja (2023), SCTV
- Mentari di Balik Awan (1996), RCTI
- Pernikahan Dini (2001–02), RCTI
- Pernikahan Dini (2023), Disney+ Hotstar
- Pernikahan Dini Gen Z (2025–26), MDTV
- Pretty Little Liars (2020), Viu
- Samuel (2026), WeTV
- Santri Pilihan Bunda (2024), Vidio
- Virgin: The Series (2005), ANTV
- Virgin: The Series (2022), Disney+ Hotstar

== Ireland ==
- Aifric (2006–07), TG4
- Eipic (2016), TG4
- Louise Lives Large (2024–present), RTÉ2
- Normal People (2020), RTÉ One
- Saol Ella (2023), TG4
- Seacht (2008–11), TG4
- The Spike (1978), RTÉ
- Video Nasty (2025–present), Virgin Media One

== Israel ==
- Alifim (2011–13), Arutz HaYeladim, yes
- Alumim (2021), Kan 11
- Black Space (2020–21), Channel 13
- Bney Or (2021), yes
- Deus (2008–10), Arutz HaYeladim
- Eilat (2018), HOT
- Euphoria (2012–13), HOT3
- Flashback (2016–17), Arutz HaYeladim, HOT
- Forever (2018–19), TeenNick Israel
- Galis (2012–16), Arutz HaYeladim, HOT
- The Greenhouse (2012–16), TeenNick Israel
- Ha-Yeladim Mi'Givat Napoleon (2001–04), Arutz HaYeladim
- HaShminiya (2005–14), Arutz HaYeladim
- The Hood (2014–18), TeenNick Israel
- Inyan Shel Zman (1992–96), Israeli Educational Television
- North Star (2014–16), Disney Channel Israel
- Rising (2020–22), TeenNick Israel
- Spell Keepers (2017–19), Nickelodeon Israel
- Split (2009–12), HOT, Arutz HaYeladim
- Summer Days (2012–13), Disney Channel Israel
- United High (2024–present), TeenNick Israel, Hot
- Vanished (2016–21), TeenNick Israel
- Ziggy (2020–23), TeenNick Israel

== Italy ==
- 5 minuti prima (2022), RaiPlay
- Adoration (2024), Netflix
- Anna (2021), Sky Italia
- A.U.S. - Adotta Uno Studente (2015), Rai.tv
- Baby (2018–20), Netflix
- Bang Bang Baby (2022), Amazon Prime Video
- Blocco 181 (2022), Sky Atlantic
- Braccialetti rossi (2014–16), Rai 1
- Club 57 (2019–20), Rai Gulp
- Come diventare popolari a scuola (2015), Rai 4
- Come sopravvivere ad una sorella strxxxa (2015), Rai 4
- Compagni di scuola (2001), Rai 2
- La Compagnia del Cigno (2019–21), Rai 1
- Corpo Libero (2022), Rai 2, Paramount+
- Curon (2020), Netflix
- Di4ries (2022−23), Netflix
- Fate: The Winx Saga (2021–22), Netflix
- Fuoriclasse (2011–15), Rai 1
- Fuoriclasse Off (2015), Rai.tv
- Genitori vs figli (2015), Rai.tv
- Home Sweet Rome! (2023), RaiPlay
- Interbang‽ (1984), Odeon TV
- I liceali (2008–11), Joi, Canale 5
- I ragazzi del muretto (1991–1996), Rai 2
- JAMS (2019–20), Rai Gulp
- The Lying Life of Adults (2023), Netflix
- Lontana da me (2015), Rai.tv
- Love Dilemma (2018), Real Time
- Luna Nera (2020), Netflix
- Mental (2020), RaiPlay
- Minerva Academy (2026–present), Netflix
- Notte prima degli esami '82 (2011), Rai 1
- Nudes (2021), RaiPlay
- Penny on M.A.R.S. (2018–20), Disney Channel Italy
- Prisma (2022–2024), Amazon Prime Video
- POV - I primi anni (2021–22), Rai Gulp
- Riv4lries (2025–present), Netflix
- Romanzo famigliare (2018), Rai 1
- The Sea Beyond (2020–present), Rai 2
- Shake (2023), RaiPlay
- Skam Italia (2018–24), TIMvision, Netflix
- Summertime (2020–22), Netflix
- Zero (2021), Netflix

== Japan ==
- 1 Litre no Namida (2005), Fuji TV
- 17-sai -at seventeen- (1994), Fuji TV
- 17.3 about a sex (2020), AbemaTV
- 3 Nen A Kumi: Ima kara Mina-san wa, Hitojichi Desu (2019), NTV
- 49 (2013), NTV
- Akai Basshu! (1987–88), Fuji TV
- Akai Ringo (2023), ABC
- Aikatsu Planet! (2021), TXN
- Ao Haru Ride (2023–24), Wowow
- Aozora Futatabi (2019), ABC
- Amachan (2013), NHK
- Are You Ready? Hey You Girl! (2018), TBS
- Asunaro Hakusho (1993), Fuji TV
- Bakayarou no Kiss (2022) NTV
- Black Cinderella (2021), AbemaTV
- Black School Rules (2019), NTV, Hulu Japan
- Blazing Transfer Students (2017), Netflix
- Boku no Ikiru Michi (2003), Fuji TV
- Boys Over Flowers Season 2 (2018), TBS
- Bukatsu, Suki Janakya Dame Desu Ka? (2018), NTV
- Camera, Hajimete mo Ii desu ka? (2023), BS Shochiku Tokyu
- Chastity High (2024), Netflix
- Check It Out, Yo!! in Tokyo (2006), Fuji TV
- Chihayafuru: Full Circle (2025), NTV
- Chūgakusei Nikki (2018), TBS
- Ciguatera (2023), TV Tokyo
- Crescendo de Susume (2022), NTV
- Crosstail: Tantei Kyoushitsu (2022), Fuji TV, Tokai TV
- Crow's Blood (2016), Hulu Japan
- Dance Drill (2006), Fuji TV
- Death Cash (2016), TBS
- A Devil and Her Love Song (2021), Hulu Japan
- Detective School Q (2007), NTV
- Dive!! (2021), TV Tokyo
- Do It Yourself!! (2023), MBS
- Don't You Think Girls Who Talk in Hakata Dialect Are Cute? (2019), FBS, Hulu
- Dragon Zakura (2005), TBS
- Dragons of Wonderhatch (2023), Disney+ (Star Hub)
- Drop (2023), Wowow
- Fight (2005), NHK
- Flower and the Beast (2017–19), dTV, Fuji TV
- The Flowers of Evil (2026), TV Tokyo
- Flunk Punk Rumble (2010), TBS
- From Me to You: Kimi ni Todoke (2023), Netflix
- Fukaku Mogure (2000), NHK
- Futari no Sebango 4 (2022), ABC
- Fujoshi, Ukkari Gei ni Kokuru (2019), NHK
- Gakkō ja Oshierarenai! (2008), NTV
- Gakkō no Kaidan (2015), NTV
- GaruGaku ~Girls Garden~ (2021), TV Tokyo
- Ginrou Kaiki File (1996), NTV
- Given (2021), Fuji TV
- Glass Heart (2025), Netflix
- Gomen ne Seishun! (2014), TBS
- Hajimete Koi wo Shita Hi ni Yomu Hanashi (2019), TBS
- Hana Yori Dango (2005), TBS
- Hana Yori Dango Returns (2007), TBS
- Hanazakari no Kimitachi e (2007), Fuji TV
- Hanazakari no Kimitachi e (2011), Fuji TV
- Haru wa Mijikashi Koiseyo Danshi. (2023), NTV
- Hashire! Sayuri-chan (2015), NTV
- Hatsumori Bemars (2015), TV Tokyo
- Hazume! Ieroboru (1987), Fuji TV
- Here Is Greenwood (2008), TV Tokyo
- High School Drive (2012), BeeTV
- The High School Heroes (2021), ABC
- High School Rakugaki (1989), TBS
- Himitsu no Ai-chan (2021), Fuji TV
- His - Koisuru Tsumori Nante Nakatta (2019), Nagoya TV
- Hiyokko (2017), NHK
- Hold on, Harutora-kun (2026–present), MBS
- Homeroom (2020), MBS
- Honey and Clover (2008), Fuji TV
- Hono no Seishun (1969), NTV
- How I Attended an All-Guy's Mixer (2022), Kansai TV, Tokyo MX
- I"s (2018–19), SKY PerfecTV!
- Itazura na Kiss (1996), ABC
- Junai Dissonance (2022), Fuji TV
- Kaguya-sama: Love Is War (2021), TBS, Amazon Prime Video
- Kakegurui – Compulsive Gambler (2018–19), MBS
- Kimi ni wa Todokanai. (2023), TBS
- Kimi to Nara Koi wo Shite Mite mo (2023), MBS
- Kinpachi-sensei (1979–2011), TBS
- Kirio Fan Club (2025), Chukyo TV
- Koeharu! (2021), NTV
- Koi ni Mudaguchi (2022), ABC
- Koi no Yamai to Yarougumi (2019–22), NTV
- Koizora (2008), TBS
- Kōkō Kyōshi (1993), TBS
- Kōkō Kyōshi (2003), TBS
- Kokoro no Fufufu (2021), Wowow
- Kōkōsei Restaurant (2011), NTV
- Komi Can't Communicate (2021), NHK
- Kono Hatsukoi wa Fiction desu (2021), TBS
- Kore ga Seishun da (1966), NTV
- Korekkiri Summer (2020), NHK
- Kyō Kara Ore Wa!! (2018), NTV
- Kyouso no Musume (2022), MBS
- L×I×V×E (1999), TBS
- Life (2007), Fuji TV
- Limit (2013), TV Tokyo
- The Long Love Letter (2002), Fuji TV
- Love Unseen Beneath the Clear Night Sky (2025–26), MBS
- Love's in Sight! (2021), NTV
- MAGI The Tensho Boys' Embassy (2019), Amazon Prime Video
- The Main and Favorite Duties of Ms. Kurishita (2026), Tokyo MX
- Mairunovich (2021), Hulu Japan
- Maji de Koukaishitemasu (2017), MBS
- Majimuri Gakuen (2018), NTV
- Majisuka Gakuen (2010–11), TV Tokyo
- A Man Who Defies the World of BL (2021–25), ABC
- Manatsu no Shonen: 19452020 (2020), ABC
- Mayonaka no Nioi (1984), Fuji TV
- Mei-chan no Shitsuji (2009), Fuji TV
- More Than Words (2022), Amazon Prime Video
- Moshimo, Ikemen Dake no Koukou ga Attara (2022), ABC
- Mother at Fourteen (2006), NTV
- Moyasimon: Tales of Agriculture (2012), Fuji TV
- Mr. Unlucky Has No Choice But to Kiss! (2022), MBS
- Mujaki na Kankei (1984), TBS
- Murai no Koi (2022), TBS
- My Boss My Hero (2006), NTV
- My Love Mix-Up! (2021), ABC
- My Summer of You (2026–present), TV Tokyo
- My Undead Yokai Girlfriend (2024), Amazon Prime Video
- Myubu: Himitsu no Uta Zono (2018), Nagoya TV
- Nanba MG5 (2022), Fuji TV
- Natsu, Taiken Monogatari (1985–86), TBS
- Nobuta wo Produce (2005), NTV
- Nodame Cantabile (2006), Fuji TV
- No Dropping Out: Back to School at 35 (2013), NTV
- Numaru. Minato-ku Joshikosei (2023), NTV
- Omotesando Koukou Gasshoubu (2015), TBS
- Orange Days (2004), TBS
- Otomen (2009), Fuji TV
- Our Textbook (2007), Fuji TV
- Perfect Son (2012), NTV
- Piece – Kanojo no Kioku (2012), NTV
- Ponytail wa Furimukanai (1985–86), TBS
- Popular Serizawa Acts Weird Around Me (2026–present), YTV
- Princess Princess D (2006), ABC
- Prison School (2015), MBS, TBS
- Pro Golfer Reiko (1987–88), Fuji TV
- Puzzle (2007), ABC
- Q10 (2010), NTV
- Re:Mind (2017), Netflix, TV Tokyo
- Renai Kakumei (2025), ABC
- Renai no Susume (2023), TBS
- Rock, Paper, Landmines (2026), Amazon Prime Video
- Rocket Boys (2001), TV Tokyo
- Rokudenashi Blues (2011), NTV
- Rokugatsu no Time Machine (2025), BS12 TwellV
- Rookies (2008), TBS
- Ryosangata Ruka: Puramo Buin no Aoki Gyakushu (2025), TV Tokyo
- Saiko no Seito: Yomei Ichinen no Last Dance (2023), NTV
- Sailor Suit and Machine Gun (1982), Fuji TV
- Sailor Suit and Machine Gun (2006), TBS
- Sailor Zombies (2014), TV Tokyo
- Saki (2016), TBS
- Samurai High School (2009), NTV
- Sanctuary (2023), Netflix
- Sashidashinin wa, Daredesuka? (2022), TBS
- Scrap Teacher (2008), NTV
- School Trip: Joined a Group I'm Not Close To (2025), ABC
- School Wars: Hero (1984–85), TBS
- Scum's Wish (2017), Fuji TV
- Seven Days of a Daddy and a Daughter (2007), TBS
- Seven Days of a Daddy and a Daughter (2022), TBS
- Shadow of Youth (1994), ABC
- She (2015), Fuji TV
- Shimane ga Dorama ni Naru Nante! (2021), TSK
- Shimobee (2022), NHK
- Shin Shinchou Kouki: Classmate wa Sengoku Busho (2022), NTV
- Shiritsu Bakaleya Koukou (2012), NTV
- Shōkōjo Seira (2009), TBS
- Short Program (2022), Amazon Prime Video
- Shoujo no Miru Yume (2016), ABC
- Sixteen Shoukougun (2020), Fuji TV
- Socho Shihatsu no Sappukei (2022), Wowow
- Sono toki Heartwa Nusumareta (1992), Fuji TV
- Sotsu Uta (2010), Fuji TV
- Sotsugyo Bakamentari (2018), NTV
- Spinner Bait (2026–present), Fuji TV
- Sprout (2012), NTV
- Stand Up! (2003), TBS
- Strawberry on the Shortcake (2001), TBS
- Strobe Edge (2025–26), Wowow
- Subete no Koi wa Kataomoi kara Hajimaruppoi (2021), YouTube
- Sūgaku Joshi Gakuen (2012), NTV
- Sugarless (2012), NTV
- Sukeban Deka (1985), ABC
- Sumire 16 sai!! (2008), BS Fuji
- Sumo Do, Sumo Don't (2022), Disney+
- Sundome (2023), ABEMA
- Switched (2018), Netflix
- Taiyo to Umi no Kyoshitsu (2008), Fuji TV
- Takara-kun to Amagi-kun (2022), MBS
- Takumi-kun Series: Drama (2025), BS Fuji
- Teasing Master Takagi-san (2024), TBS
- Teen Court: 10-dai Saiban (2012), NTV
- Tengoku no Kiss (1999), ABC
- Tenkosei Nano (2026), FOD
- Teppachi! (2022), Fuji TV
- Terms for a Witch (1999), TBS
- Threads of Destiny (2008–09), Fuji TV
- Tokuyama Daigoro wo Dare ga Koroshita ka? (2016), TV Tokyo
- Tomehane! Suzuri Kōkō Shodōbu (2010), NHK
- Transit Girls (2015), Fuji TV
- Tsukai! Fukei Koho-sei yaru kkya nai Mon! (1987), ABC
- Tumbling (2010), TBS
- Umi to Sora to Hasu to (2020), ABC
- Utsukushii Kare (2021–23), MBS
- Viral Hit (2026–present), Netflix
- Wakaba no Koro (1996), TBS
- Water Boys (2004), Fuji TV
- Water Boys 2 (2004), Fuji TV
- Water Boys 2005 Natsu (2005), Fuji TV
- Water Polo Yankees (2014), Fuji TV
- XxxHolic (2013), Wowow
- Warera Seishun! (1974), NTV
- Yamada-kun and the Seven Witches (2013), Fuji TV
- Yamato Nadeshiko Shichi Henge (2010), TBS
- Watashi Ga Shindemo Sekai Wa Ugoku (2008), Family Gekijo
- Young Ladies Don't Play Fighting Games (2023), Lemino
- Your Sky: Hare Nochi Koi (2026–present), Tokyo MX
- Your Summer, My Storm (2026–present), ABC
- Yowakutemo Katemasu (2014), NTV
- Yowamushi Pedal (2016–18), SKY PerfecTV!
- Yume Miru Koro wo Sugitemo (1994), TBS
- YuYu Hakusho (2023), Netflix
- Zambi (2019), NTV
- Zankokuna Kankyakutachi (2017), NTV
- Zenryoku! Cleaners (2022), ABC

== Jordan ==
- AlRawabi School for Girls (2021–24), Netflix
- Jinn (2019), Netflix

== Kenya ==
- PAA, Born to FLY (2022–present), Citizen TV
- Shuga (2009–11), MTV Base
- Tahidi High (2006–20), Citizen TV

== Malaysia ==
- Dari Mata Turun Ke Hati (2024), Astro Ria
- Married Tapi Benci (2016), TV3

== Mexico ==
- 11-11: En mi cuadra nada cuadra (2013), Nickelodeon Latin America
- Agujetas de color de rosa (1994–95), Canal de las Estrellas
- Alcanzar una estrella (1990), Canal de las Estrellas
- Alcanzar una estrella II (1991), Canal de las Estrellas
- Amigas y rivales (2001), Canal de las Estrellas
- Aventuras en el tiempo (2001), Canal de las Estrellas
- Baila conmigo (1992), Canal de las Estrellas
- Bienvenida realidad (2011), Cadenatres
- Buscando el paraíso (1993–94), Canal de las Estrellas
- Cindy la Regia: The High School Years (2023), Netflix
- Clap, el lugar de tus sueños (2003–04), Canal de las Estrellas
- Clase 406 (2002–03), Canal de las Estrellas
- The Club (2019), Netflix
- Código postal (2006–07), Televisa
- Cómplices al rescate (2002), Canal de las Estrellas
- Confidente de secundaria (1996), Canal de las Estrellas
- Control Z (2020–22), Netflix
- El corazón nunca se equivoca (2019), Las Estrellas
- Corazones al límite (2004), Televisa
- Daddies on Request (2022–23), Disney+
- Dani Who? (2019–20), Paramount Channel
- Despertar contigo (2016–17), Canal de las Estrellas
- Diablo Guardián (2018–19), Amazon Prime Video
- Divina, está en tu corazón (2017), Canal 5
- DKDA: Sueños de juventud (1999–2000), Canal de las Estrellas
- Dulce desafío (1988–89), Televisa S.A. de C.V.
- Enamórate (2003), Azteca Trece
- Esta historia me suena (2019–23), Canal de las Estrellas
- Final Project (2026–present), Netflix
- Gossip Girl: Acapulco (2013), Golden Premier, UniMás, Canal 5
- El juego de la vida (2001–02), Canal de las Estrellas
- I Love You and It Hurts (2023), Max
- I Would Rather Die (2026–present), Amazon Prime Video
- Kally's Mashup (2017–19), Nickelodeon Latin America
- Like (2018–19), Las Estrellas
- L-POP (2023), Disney+
- Locura de amor (2000), Canal de las Estrellas
- Lola: Once Upon a Time (2007–08), Televisa
- Lucha: Despierta tu naturaleza (2024), Disney Channel Latin America
- Luz y sombra (1989), Canal de las Estrellas
- Mágica juventud (1992–93), Canal de las Estrellas
- Mi pequeña traviesa (1997–98), Canal de las Estrellas
- The Most Beautiful Flower (2022), Netflix
- Muchachitas (1991–92), Televisa
- Muchachitas como tú (2007), Televisa
- Niña de mi corazón (2010), Canal de las Estrellas
- Niñas mal (2010–13), MTV Latin America
- No One Will Miss Us (2024–present), Amazon Prime Video
- Un paso hacia ti (2026–present), Canal 5
- Pobre juventud (1986–87), Canal de las Estrellas
- Preciosa (1998), Canal de las Estrellas
- Primer amor, a mil por hora (2000–01), Televisa
- ¿Qué le pasa a mi familia? (2021), Canal de las Estrellas
- Quinceañera (1987–88), Televisa S.A. de C.V.
- Rebelde (2004–06), TL Novelas
- Rebelde (2022), Netflix
- La reina soy yo (2019), Univision, Canal de las Estrellas
- Soltero con hijas (2019–20), Canal de las Estrellas
- Soñadoras (1998–99), Televisa
- Soy Luna (2016–18), Disney Channel Latin America
- Súbete a mi moto (2020), Amazon Prime Video
- Último año (2012), MTV Latin America
- Unburied (2025–present), Amazon Prime Video
- Vencer el desamor (2020–21), Canal de las Estrellas
- Vencer el miedo (2020), Canal de las Estrellas
- Vencer el pasado (2021), Canal de las Estrellas
- Vencer la ausencia (2022), Canal de las Estrellas
- Vencer la culpa (2023), Canal de las Estrellas
- Verano de amor (2009), Televisa

== Netherlands ==
- Ares (2020), Netflix
- De Ludwigs (2016–19), Nickelodeon Netherlands
- The First Years (2014–present), NPO 3
- Goede tijden, slechte tijden (1990–present), RTL 4
- Herres (2021–22), NPO 3
- Het Huis Anubis (2006–09), Nickelodeon Netherlands
- Het Huis Anubis en de Vijf van het Magische Zwaard (2010–11), Nickelodeon Netherlands
- The Letter for the King (2020), Netflix
- Locked Out (2020–21), NPO 3
- Misfit: The Series (2021), Netflix
- Nieuwe Tijden (2016–18), RTL 4, RTL 5
- De slet van 6vwo (2017–21), NPO 3
- Skam NL (2018–19), NPO 3
- SpangaS (2007–22), Nederland 3, NPO 3
- A Teenage Love Affair (2023), NPO 3
- Topstars (2004–06), TROS
- Verborgen Verhalen (2009–14) EO
- VRijland (2010–13), Nederland 3
- Wadoeje (2022), NPO 3
- WTF?! (2022), NPO 3
- Zoop (2004–07), Nickelodeon Netherlands

== New Zealand ==
- The Cul de Sac (2016–18), TV2
- Head High (2020–21), Three
- The Killian Curse (2006–08), TV2
- Maddigan's Quest (2006), TV3
- Mystic (2020–22), TVNZ
- The New Legends of Monkey (2018–20), TV2
- Paradise Café (2009–11), TV2
- This Is Piki (2016), Māori Television

== Nigeria ==
- Best Friends in the World (2018–22), YouTube
- Far from Home (2022), Netflix
- Journey to Bloom (2024), YouTube
- Shuga (2013–20), MTV Base

== Norway ==
- 16–19 (2018), NRK3
- Beist (2023), NRK3
- Blank (2018–19), NRK3
- Delete Me (2021–23), Viaplay
- Etter Benjamin (2025), NRK1
- Fjortis (2001), NRK1
- Forelsket 87 (1987), NRK
- Heirs of the Night (2019–20), NRK3
- Husky (2023), NRK Super
- Hybris (2023), NRK3
- Jenter (2013–17), NRK Super
- Johnny og Johanna (2004–06), NRK1
- Kameleon (2026–present), NRK
- Kids in Crime (2022), TV2
- Klassen (2020–present), NRK Super
- Kongen av Gulset (2019–20), NRK3
- Kuppel 16 (2022), NRK1
- Lik Meg (2018–24), NRK Super
- Lovleg (2018–19), NRK3
- MIA (2010–12), NRK Super
- Nødt eller sannhet (2021), NRK Super
- Noen lyver (2025–present), NRK
- Nudes (2019), NRK3
- Oro jaska – Hold kjeft (2024), NRK
- Ragnarok (2020–23), Netflix
- Requiem for Selina (2025), NRK
- Rykter (2022–present), NRK3
- Saving the Fucking Planet (2023), NRK1
- Semester (2018–19), null.video, NRK1
- Skam (2015–17), NRK3
- Skitten snø (2019), NRK3
- Solo (2024), Amazon Prime Video
- Trio (2014–16), NRK Super
- VGS (2022–present), NRK3
- Yggdrasil (2002), NRK1

== Pakistan ==
- College Gate (2023), YouTube
- Dreamers (2010–11), Aag TV
- Humsafar (2011–12), Hum TV
- Kahi Un Kahi (2012), Hum TV
- Khwab Saraye (2016), Hum TV
- Kiya Life Hai (2011), ARY Digital
- Main Abdul Qadir Hoon (2010–11), Hum TV
- Mann Mayal (2016), Hum TV
- Meri Behan Maya (2012–13), Geo TV
- Meri Saheli Meri Humjoli (2012), Urdu 1
- Mor Mahal (2012–13), Geo TV
- Teri Meri Kahani (2018), Hum TV
- Zindagi Gulzar Hai (2012–13), Hum TV

== Peru ==
- Boulevard Torbellino (1997), Latina Televisión
- Cumbia pop (2018), América Televisión
- Torbellino (1997), Latina Televisión

== Philippines ==
- 1DOL (2010), ABS-CBN
- Abt Ur Luv (2006–08), ABS-CBN
- Amo (2018), 5
- Ang Mutya ng Section E (2025–present), Viva One
- Angelito: Batang Ama (2011–12), ABS-CBN
- Anna Karenina (1996–2002), GMA Network
- Anna Karenina (2013), GMA Network
- Aryana (2012–13), ABS-CBN
- Astigs (2008), ABS-CBN
- Bagets: Just Got Lucky (2011–12), TV5
- Bagito (2014–15), ABS-CBN
- Beach Bros (2022), iWantTFC
- Berks (2002–04), ABS-CBN
- BFGF (2010–11), TV5
- Boys' Lockdown (2020), YouTube
- Buttercup (2003–04), ABS-CBN
- Click (1999–2004), GMA Network
- Doble Kara (2015–17), ABS-CBN
- Dormitoryo (2013), GMA Network
- First Time (2010), GMA Network
- Gameboys (2020), YouTube
- G-mik (1999–2002), ABS-CBN
- Gimik (1996–99), ABS-CBN
- Good Vibes (2011), ABS-CBN
- Got to Believe (2013–14), ABS-CBN
- Growing Up (1997–99), GMA Network
- Growing Up (2011–12), ABS-CBN
- The Half Sisters (2014–16), GMA Network
- He's Into Her (2021–22), iWantTFC, Kapamilya Channel, A2Z
- Huwag Kang Mangamba (2021), A2Z, Kapamilya Channel, TV5
- Ina, Kapatid, Anak (2012–13), ABS-CBN
- Joyride (2004–05), GMA Network
- Kahit Kailan (2002–03), GMA Network
- Katorse (2009–10), ABS-CBN
- Lipgloss (2008–09), TV5
- Love at First Spike (2025), iWant
- Maka (2024–25), GMA Network
- Mara Clara (1992–97), ABS-CBN
- Mara Clara (2010–11), ABS-CBN
- Miss Behave (2026–present), iWant
- My Girl (2008), ABS-CBN
- Oh My G! (2015), ABS-CBN
- On the Wings of Love (2015–16), ABS-CBN
- Princess and I (2012–13), ABS-CBN
- POSH (2006), Q
- Sana Maulit Muli (2007), ABS-CBN
- Sarah the Teen Princess (2004), ABS-CBN
- Senior High (2023–2024), Kapamilya Channel, iWantTFC
- Spirits (2004–05), ABS-CBN
- Spirits: Reawaken (2018), iWant
- T.G.I.S. (1995–99), GMA Network
- Tabing Ilog (1999–2003), ABS-CBN
- Teen Gen (2012–13), GMA Network
- That's My Amboy (2016), GMA Network
- Till I Met You (2016–17), ABS-CBN
- Together Forever (2012), GMA Network
- Trops (2016–17), GMA Network
- Tween Hearts (2010–12), GMA Network
- Wish I May (2016), GMA Network

== Poland ==
- Absolute Beginners (2023), Netflix
- BringBackAlice (2023), HBO Max
- Infamy (2023), Netflix
- Open Your Eyes (2021), Netflix
- Sexify (2021–23), Netflix

== Portugal ==
- Água de Mar (2014–15), RTP1
- I Love It (2013–17), TVI
- Lua Vermelha (2010–12), SIC
- Massa Fresca (2016), TVI
- Morangos com Açúcar (2003–12), TVI
- Os Melhores Anos (1990–92), RTP1
- Rebelde Way (2008–09), SIC
- Riscos (1997), RTP1

== Puerto Rico ==
- @Gina Yei: #WithAllMyHeartAndMore (2023), Disney+
- Súbete a mi moto (2020), Amazon Prime Video

== Singapore ==
- On the Fringe (1988), Channel 8
- On the Fringe (2011), Channel 8
- Spin (1999), Channel 5
- Teenage Textbook – The Series (2021), Channel 5
- Vetri (2014–16), Vasantham

== South Africa ==
- Backstage (2000–07), e.tv
- Blood & Water (2020–2024), Netflix
- Classified (2024), Netflix
- The Girl from St. Agnes, (2019), Showmax
- Grassroots (2019), One Magic, Showmax
- Is'Thunzi (2016–17), Mzansi Magic
- Jiva! (2021), Netflix
- Miseducation (2023), Netflix
- Nkululeko (2018–19), Mzansi Magic
- Obstruction (2024), Mzansi Magic
- Reënboogrant (2025–present), Showmax
- Shuga (2017–20), MTV Base
- Signal High (2013–18), SABC 2
- Skeem Saam (2011–present), SABC 1
- Spinners (2023), Showmax
- Yizo Yizo (1999–2004), SABC 1
- Youngins (2024–25), Showmax

== South Korea ==
- 9 Seconds - Eternal Time (2015), Naver TV Cast
- A-Teen (2018), Naver TV Cast
- A-Teen 2 (2019), Naver TV Cast
- Absolute Value of Romance (2026), Coupang Play
- Adult Trainee (2021), TVING
- After School: Lucky or Not (2013–15), MBC Every 1, Naver TV Cast
- Aftermath (2014), Naver TV Cast
- All of Us Are Dead (2022–present), Netflix
- All That We Loved (2023), TVING
- Andante (2017–18), KBS1
- Angry Mom (2015), MBC
- Arthdal Chronicles (2019–23), tvN
- At a Distance, Spring Is Green (2021), KBS2
- At Eighteen (2019), JTBC
- Bad Friends (2000), MBC
- Ball Boy Tactics (2025), Heavenly
- Best Mistake (2019–22), V Live
- Bitch x Rich (2023–25), Wavve
- Big (2012), KBS2
- Blue Classroom (1987–88), MBC
- Blue Temperature (2023), Naver TV Cast
- Boys Over Flowers (2009), KBS2
- Brilliant Legacy (2009), SBS
- Cheer Up! (2015), KBS2
- Cheer Up (2022), SBS
- Cheese in the Trap (2016), tvN
- Cinderella with Four Knights (2016), tvN
- City Hunter (2011), SBS
- Class of Lies (2019), OCN
- Click Your Heart (2016), MBC Every 1, Naver TV Cast
- Cool Guys, Hot Ramen (2011), tvN
- Crushology 101 (2025), MBC TV
- Dear. M (2022), KBS2
- Devil Inspector (2017–18), Naver TV Cast
- Doctor Stranger (2014), SBS
- Doona! (2023), Netflix
- Dream High (2011), KBS2
- Dream High 2 (2012), KBS2
- Duty After School (2023), TVING
- Exciting Change (2004), MBC
- Extracurricular (2020), Netflix
- Extraordinary You (2019), MBC
- Faith (2012), SBS
- Fall for You (2022), EBS 1TV
- Farming Academy (2019), SBS
- Feel It, Genie (2018–19), Olleh TV
- The Flatterer (2015), Naver TV Cast
- Flower Band (2012), tvN
- Forever Young (2025–26), Wavve
- Four Hands, Two Sonatas (2026–present), tvN
- Fragile (2024), U+ Mobile TV
- Friendly Rivalry (2025), U+ Mobile TV
- Gangnam Beauty (2018), JTBC
- Girls' Generation 1979 (2017), KBS2
- The Golden Spoon (2022), MBC
- Gogyosaeng Ilgi (1983), KBS1
- Gu Family Book (2013), MBC
- Head Over Heels (2025), TVING
- Heard It Through the Grapevine (2015), SBS
- Heart Stain (2025), Heavenly
- Heartstrings (2011), MBC
- Heesu in Class 2 (2025), Heavenly
- The Heirs (2013), SBS
- Hello, Me! (2021), KBS2
- Hi! School: Love On (2014), KBS2
- Hierarchy (2024), Netflix
- High Cookie (2023), U+ Mobile TV
- High School King of Savvy (2014), tvN
- How to Buy a Friend (2020), KBS2
- I Am a Running Mate (2025), TVING
- I Am Sam (2007), KBS2
- If Wishes Could Kill (2026), Netflix
- IN-SEOUL (2019–20), V Live, JTBC
- It's Okay to Be Sensitive (2018–19), Naver TV Cast
- Jungle Fish (2008), KBS2
- Just Dance (2018), KBS2
- A Killer Paradox (2024), Netflix
- Kwangki (1999–2000), KBS2
- The Liar and His Lover (2017), tvN
- Lie to Me (2011), SBS
- Live On (2020–21), JTBC
- Love Alarm (2019–21), Netflix
- Love for Love's Sake (2024), Heavenly.tv
- Love in the Moonlight (2016), KBS2
- Love Revolution (2020), KakaoTV, Naver TV Cast
- A Love So Beautiful (2020–21), KakaoTV
- Love.exe (2025), Wavve
- Ma Boy (2012), Tooniverse
- Mackerel Run (2007), SBS
- Marry Me, Mary! (2010), KBS2
- Master of Study (2010), KBS2
- Master's Sun (2013), SBS
- Mimicus (2022), Naver Now
- Missing You (2012–13), MBC
- The Moment the Heart Shines (2021), EBS 1
- Monstar (2013), Mnet, tvN
- Moorim School: Saga of the Brave (2016), KBS2
- Moving (2023), Disney+ (Star Hub)
- My First First Love (2019), Netflix
- My First Love (2018), OCN
- My Love By My Side (2011), SBS
- My Mukbang Diary (2020), Tooniverse
- My Runway (2016), tvN
- My Strange Hero (2018–19), SBS
- My YouTube Diary (2019–20), Tooniverse
- Naeil's Cantabile (2014), KBS2
- Nevertheless (2021), JTBC
- Night Has Come (2023), Viki
- One: High School Heroes (2025), Wavve
- Operation Proposal (2012), TV Chosun
- Orange Marmalade (2015), KBS2
- Our Love Triangle (2024), Viki
- Page Turner (2016), KBS2
- Parasyte: The Grey (2024), Netflix
- Pinocchio (2014), SBS
- Playful Kiss (2010), MBC
- Police University (2021), KBS2
- Princess Hours (2006), MBC
- Puberty Medley (2013), KBS2
- Pyramid Game (2024), TVING
- Racket Boys (2021), SBS
- Real School (2011), MBC Every 1
- Replay: The Moment When It Starts Again (2021), KakaoTV
- Reply 1988 (2015–16), tvN
- Reply 1994 (2013), tvN
- Reply 1997 (2012), tvN
- Reunited Worlds (2017), SBS
- Revenge of Others (2022), Disney+ (Star Hub)
- Romance (2002), MBC
- Rookie Cops (2022), Disney+ (Star Hub)
- Sang Doo! Let's Go to School (2003), KBS2
- School (1999–2002), KBS2
- School 2013 (2012–13), KBS2
- School 2017 (2017), KBS2
- School 2021 (2021–22), KBS2
- Schoolgirl Detectives (2014–15), JTBC
- Secret Campus (2006), EBS 1
- Secret Garden (2010–11), SBS
- Seventeen (2017), Naver TV Cast
- Sharp (2003–07), KBS2
- SKY Castle (2018–19), JTBC
- Snap and Spark (2023–24), KOKTV
- So Not Worth It (2021), Netflix
- Solomon's Perjury (2016), JTBC
- Somehow 18 (2017), Naver TV Cast, JTBC
- Something's Not Right (2025), Heavenly
- The Sound of Magic (2022), Netflix
- Spirit Fingers (2025), TVING
- Spring of Youth (2025), SBS TV
- Study Group (2025–present), TVING
- Summertime (2026–present), Wavve
- Sungkyunkwan Scandal (2010), KBS2
- Sweet Home (2020–24), Netflix
- Sweet Revenge (2017–18), Oksusu
- Sweet Revenge 2 (2018), XtvN
- Teach You a Lesson (2026), Netflix
- To the Beautiful You (2012), SBS
- True Beauty (2020–21), tvN
- Twenty-Five Twenty-One (2022), tvN
- Twinkling Watermelon (2023), tvN
- Two Weeks (2013), MBC
- Ultimate Weapon Alice (2022), Watcha
- The Uncanny Counter (2020–23), OCN, tvN
- Unexpected Heroes (2017), Naver TV Cast
- Vigilante (2023), Disney+ (Star Hub)
- Weak Hero (2022–25), Wavve, Netflix
- What Happens to My Family? (2014–15), KBS2
- Weightlifting Fairy Kim Bok-joo (2016–17), MBC
- What's Up (2011–12), MBN
- White Christmas (2017), KBS
- Will You Be My Manager? (2025), Wavve
- Wind Up (2026), KITZ
- The Winning Try (2025), SBS
- Who Are You: School 2015 (2015), KBS2
- The World of My 17 (2020–22), V Live
- You're All Surrounded (2014), SBS
- You're Beautiful (2009), SBS

== Spain ==
- 18, la serie (2008–09), Antena 3
- 20 tantos (2002–03), Telecinco
- 90-60-90, diario secreto de una adolescente (2009), Antena 3
- La Academia (2024), 3Cat, Amazon Prime Video
- Al salir de clase (1997–2002), Telecinco
- Alive and Kicking (2021), Movistar+
- Amistades peligrosas (2006), Cuatro
- Ayla & the Mirrors (2024), Disney+
- El barco (2011–12), Antena 3
- The Boarding School: Las Cumbres (2021–23), Amazon Prime Video
- Bojos per Molière (2023), TV3
- Compañeros (1998–2002), Antena 3
- Cucut (2022), TV3
- Dreamland (2014), Cuatro
- Élite (2018–24), Netflix
- Feria: The Darkest Light (2022), Netflix
- Física o química (2008–11), Antena 3
- Flipante Noa (2019), Disney Channel Spain
- The Girl in the Mirror (2022), Netflix
- HIT (2020), La 1
- How to Screw It All Up (2022), HBO Max
- HKM (2008–09), Cuatro
- The Hockey Girls (2019–20), TV3
- El internado (2007–10), Antena 3
- Mar afuera (2025–present), Atresplayer
- Merlí (2015–18), TV3
- Merlí: Sapere Aude (2019–21), Movistar+
- Moebius (2021), TV3
- Nada es para siempre (1999–2000), Antena 3
- Oasis (2026–present), Netflix
- Olympo (2025), Netflix
- Paradise (2021–22), Movistar+
- Un paso adelante (2002–05), Antena 3
- La pecera de Eva (2010–11), Telecinco
- Polseres vermelles (2011–13), TV3
- Pubertat (2025–present), HBO Max
- Queer You Are (2021), TNT
- Raising Voices (2024), Netflix
- Red Flags (2024), Atresplayer
- See You in Another Life (2024), Disney+ (Star Hub)
- Ser o no ser (2022), RTVE Play
- Skam España (2018–20), Movistar+
- SMS (2006–07), laSexta
- Verano azul (1981–82), TVE1
- La vida en el aire (1998), La 2
- Welcome to Eden (2022–23), Netflix
- Yo quisiera (2015–18), Divinity
- You're Nothing Special (2022), Netflix

== Sweden ==
- Barracuda Queens (2023–present), Netflix
- Beartown (2020), HBO Nordic
- Bert (1994), Kanal 1
- Cryptid (2020), Viaplay
- Dröm (2019), SVT Barn
- Eagles (2019–22), SVT Play
- Eva & Adam (1999–2000), SVT1
- Festen (2019–21), SVT Play
- Glappet (1997), SVT1
- #hashtag (2016), SVT1
- Klassen (2017–present), SVT Play
- Livet enligt Rosa (2005), SVT1
- Otajmat (2021), SVT Play
- Portkod 1321 (2012–14), SVT Play
- Quicksand (2019), Netflix
- Den sista sommaren (2020), SVT1, SVT Play
- Sjukt oklar (2018–20), SVT1
- Spung (2002–03), SVT1
- Storstad (1990–91), Kanal 1
- Strula (2021), SVT Play
- Summer of 1985 (2026), SVT
- Where Were You? (2022), Viaplay
- Xerxes (1988), Kanal 1
- Young Royals (2021–24), Netflix

== Taiwan ==
- 49 Days with a Merman (2022), KKTV
- Age of Rebellion (2018), TVBS Entertainment Channel
- Angel 'N' Devil (2014–15), GTV
- Backlight Lovers (2013), TTV
- Bad Boys' Diary (2013), NTV Variety
- Boys Can Fly (2013), PTS
- Brown Sugar Macchiato (2007), FTV
- Bull Fighting (2007–08), TTV
- Bump Off Lover (2006), CTV
- Campus Heroes (2018), TTV
- Candy Online (2019), PTS
- Dangerous Mind (2006), PTS
- Days We Stared at the Sun (2010), PTS
- Dear Uranus (2021), YouTube
- Detention (2020), PTS
- Devil Beside You (2005), CTV
- Fly the Jumper (2020), myVideo
- A Good Day (2016), CTV
- Gloomy Salad Days (2010), PTS
- Green Forest, My Home (2005–06), Ttv
- Hanazakarino Kimitachihe (2006–07), CTS
- Hi My Sweetheart (2009–10), CTS
- High 5 Basketball (2017), GTV
- HIStory (2017–21), CHOCO TV, LINE TV
- Honey and Clover (2008), CTS
- Hot Shot (2008), CTV
- In a Good Way (2013–14), SET Metro
- It Started with a Kiss (2005–06), CTV
- Judo High (2018), iQIYI
- K.O.3an Guo (2009–10), FTV
- K.O.3an Guo 2017 (2017), iQIYI
- KO One (2005–06), GTV
- KO One Re-act (2013) GTV
- KO One Re-call (2018), iQIYI
- KO One Re-member (2016), GTV
- KO One Return (2012), GTV
- Lavender (2001–02), SET Taiwan
- The Legend of Brown Sugar Chivalries (2008), STAR TV
- Lesson in Love (2022–23), iQIYI
- Love Contract (2004), TVBS-G
- Love Cuisine (2015–16), SET Metro
- The M Riders (2010), EBC Yoyo
- The M Riders 2 (2010–11), EBC Yoyo
- The M Riders 3 (2011–12), EBC Yoyo
- The M Riders 4 (2012–13), EBC Yoyo
- The M Riders 5 (2013), EBC Yoyo
- The M Riders 6 (2014), EBC Yoyo
- Mars (2004), CTS
- Meteor Garden (2001), CTS
- Meteor Garden II (2002), CTS
- Meteor Rain (1999–2001), CTS
- Miss No Good (2008), CTS
- Momo Love (2009–10), CTV
- Moon River (2015), GTV
- More than Blue: The Series (2021), Netflix
- My MVP Valentine (2002), SET Taiwan
- Mysterious Incredible Terminator (2008–09), GTV
- Red Balloon (2017), KKTV, iQIYI
- Romance in Summer Time (2008), Hakka TV
- The Rose (2003), TTV
- Secret Lover (2025), GTV
- Seventh Grade (2003), TVBS-G
- Skip Beat! (2011–12), FTV, GTV
- Someday or One Day (2019–20), CTV
- Somewhere Over the Sky (2011), Hakka TV
- Spicy Teacher (2000–04), CTS
- The Teen Age (2007), CTS
- The Teenage Psychic (2017), PTS
- The Teenage Psychic 2 (2019), PTS
- ToGetHer (2009), CTV
- Tomorrow (2002), CTV
- We Best Love (2021), WeTV
- Year of the Rain (2010), PTS
- Ying Ye 3 Jia 1 (2007), TTV
- Youngsters on Fire (2021–22), TVBS Entertainment Channel

== Thailand ==
- 2 Moons (2017–22), ONE31
- 2gether: The Series (2020), GMM 25, LINE TV, Netflix
- 55:15 Never Too Late (2021–22), Disney+ Hotstar
- Blacklist (2019), GMM 25, LINE TV
- 'Cause You're My Boy (2018), GMMTV
- Dangerous Romance (2023), GMM 25
- Daughters (2020–21), PPTV, iQIYI
- The Eclipse (2022), GMM 25
- The Gifted (2018), ONE31, LINE TV
- The Gifted: Graduation (2020), GMM 25, LINE TV
- Girl From Nowhere (2018), GMM 25
- Girl from Nowhere: The Reset (2025–present), ONE31
- Gossip Girl: Thailand (2015), Channel 3
- Great Men Academy (2019), LINE TV
- He's Coming to Me (2019), LINE TV
- Hormones: The Series (2013–15), ONE31, GMM 25, GTH On Air
- I Told Sunset About You (2020–21), LINE TV
- The Judgement (2018), GMM 25
- Kiss: The Series (2016), GMM 25
- Kiss Me (2015), True4U
- LOL: The Series (2015), True4U
- Love Sick (2014–15), Modernine TV
- Make It Right (2016–17), Channel 9 MCOT HD, LINE TV
- My Bromance (2016–17), Channel 9 MCOT HD
- My Dream The Series (2018), LINE TV
- My School President (2022–23), GMM 25
- Naruk (2006), Channel 3
- O-Negative (2016), GMM 25, Netflix
- Our Skyy (2018), LINE TV
- Part of Love (2015), Channel 9 MCOT HD
- Part Time (2016), Channel 9 MCOT HD
- Pommanatur (2016), PPTV
- Princess Hours Thailand (2017), True4U
- Project S: The Series (2017–18), GMM 25
- Project X (2014), Mono 29
- Room Alone 401-410 (2014), ONE31, Bang Channel
- Room Alone 2 (2015–16), ONE31, Bang Channel
- School Tales The Series (2022), Netflix
- Secret Crush on You (2022), Channel 3
- Secret Seven (2017), ONE31
- Senior Secret Love (2016), ONE31
- The Shipper (2020), GMM 25, LINE TV
- Slam Dance (2017), ONE31
- Social Death Vote (2018), Channel 3
- Star and Sky: Star in My Mind (2022), GMM 25
- Still 2gether (2020), GMM 25, LINE TV
- The Stranded (2019), Netflix
- SOTUS (2016–17), ONE31
- SOTUS S (2017–18), ONE31
- Teenage Mom: The Series (2017), LINE TV, ONE31
- ThirTEEN Terrors (2014–15), ONE31, GTH On Air
- Theory of Love (2019), GMM 25, LINE TV
- Turn Left Turn Right (2020), GMM 25, LINE TV
- U-Prince (2016–17), GMM 25
- Ugly Duckling (2015), GMM 25
- Wai Sab Saraek Kad (2019), Channel 3
- War of High School (2016), Channel 9 MCOT HD
- Water Boyy (2017), GMM 25
- Who Are You (2020), GMM 25, LINE TV
- Wonder Teacher (2015), ONE31
- YOUniverse (2018), LINE TV

== Turkey ==
- 4N1K İlk Aşk (2018) Fox Turkey
- Acemi Cadı (2005–07)
- Adını Feriha Koydum (2011–12), Show TV
- Arka Sıradakiler (2007–11), Fox Turkey
- Beni Böyle Sev (2013–15), TRT1
- Bez Bebek (2007–10) Fox Turkey
- Duy Beni (2022), Star TV
- Eyvah Kızım Büyüdü (2000–01), Kanal D
- Gelsin Hayat Bildiği Gibi (dizi) (2022–23), Show TV
- Güneşi Beklerken (2013–14), Kanal D
- Hayat Bilgisi (2003–06) Kanal D, Show TV
- Hepsi 1 (2007–08), ATV
- Istanbul Encyclopedia (2025), Netflix
- Kampüsistan (2003–04), Kanal D
- Koçum Benim (2002–03) TRT1
- Kavak Yelleri (2007–11), Kanal D
- Kiraz Mevsimi (2014–15), Fox Turkey
- Küçük Sırlar (2010–11), Kanal D, Star TV
- Letters from the Past (2025), Netflix
- Lise Devriyesi (2003–04) Kanal D
- Love 101 (2020–21), Netflix
- Medcezir (2013–15), Star TV
- Melekler Korusun (2009–10), Show TV
- Pis Yedili (2011–13), Show TV
- Sana Bir Sır Vereceğim (2013–14), Fox Turkey
- Selena (2006–09), Atv
- Sihirli Annem (2003–12), Kanal D, Star Tv
- Sudan Bıkmış Balıklar (2012), Star TV
- Tatlı Küçük Yalancılar (2015), Star TV
- Yedi Numara (2000–03), TRT1

== Ukraine ==
- Early Swallows (2019–20), Novyi Kanal
- Novenka (2019), Novyi Kanal
- Sex, Insta i ZNO (2020), 1+1
- #School (2018–19), 1+1

== United Kingdom ==
- 24Seven (2001–02), CITV
- 4 O'Clock Club (2012–20), CBBC
- Ace of Wands (1970–73), ITV
- Ace Lightning (2002–2005), CBBC
- Ackley Bridge (2017–22), Channel 4
- The A List, (2018–21), BBC iPlayer, Netflix
- After Hours (2015), Sky One
- Alex Rider (2020–24), Amazon Prime Video, IMDb TV
- Almost Never (2019–21), CBBC
- Archer's Goon (1992), BBC One
- As If (2001–04), Channel 4
- The Athena (2019), Sky One
- Banana (2015), E4
- Barriers (1981–82), ITV
- The Bastard Son & The Devil Himself (2022), Netflix
- Beautiful People (2008–09), BBC Two
- Beaver Falls (2011–12), E4
- Becoming Elizabeth (2022), Starzplay
- Becoming Human (2011), BBC Three
- Being Victor (2010), STV
- The Biz (1994–96), BBC One
- Boarders (2024–26), BBC Three
- Bootleg (2002), BBC One
- Born to Kill (2017), Channel 4
- Britannia High (2008), ITV
- Buddy (1986), BBC
- Butterfly (2018), ITV
- Byker Grove (1989–2006), BBC One
- Century Falls (1993), BBC One
- The Changes (1975), BBC
- Children of the Stones (1977), ITV
- Children's Ward (1989–2000), ITV
- Chris Cross (1994–95), CITV
- Class (2016), BBC Three
- Clique (2017–18), BBC Three
- Crookhaven (2026–present), BBC One
- Codename Icarus (1981), BBC One
- Copsan (2022–23), S4C
- Crongton (2025–present), CBBC
- Custer's Last Stand-up (2001–02), BBC One, RTÉ
- The Cut (2009–10), BBC Two
- Damon and Debbie (1987), Channel 4
- Dark Season (1991), BBC One
- Demons (2009), ITV
- Delta Wave (1996), CITV
- Desperados (2007), CBBC
- Dive (2010), BBC Two
- Dodger (2022–23), CBBC
- Dreamers (2025–present), Channel 4
- Drop Dead Gorgeous (2006–07), BBC Three
- The Dumping Ground (2013–present), CBBC
- Dubplate Drama (2005–09), Channel 4
- Earthfasts (1994), BBC One
- EastEnders: E20 (2010–11), BBC Online
- Elidor (1995), BBC One
- The End of the F***ing World (2017–19), Channel 4
- The Evermoor Chronicles (2014–17), Disney Channel UK and Ireland
- Everything Now (2023), Netflix
- Eye of the Storm (1993), CITV
- The Fades (2011), BBC Three
- Fate: The Winx Saga (2021–22), Netflix
- First Degree (2002), BBC One
- Float (2021–24), BBC iPlayer
- Follyfoot (1971–73), ITV
- Free Rein (2017–19), Netflix
- Gap Year (2017), E4
- The Gathering (2024), Channel 4
- Geek Girl (2024–present), Netflix
- Generation Z (2024), Channel 4
- Get Even (2020), BBC iPlayer
- The Gemini Factor (1987), CITV
- Gifted (2025–present), CBBC
- Girls in Love (2003–05), CITV
- Glue (2014), E4
- A Good Girl's Guide to Murder (2024), BBC iPlayer
- Grange Hill (1978–2008), BBC One
- Grime Kids (2023), BBC Three
- The Growing Pains of Adrian Mole (1987), ITV
- Hafiach (2025–present), S4C
- The Haunting of Cassie Palmer (1982), ITV
- Head Over Heels (1993), ITV
- Heartstopper (2022–26), Netflix
- Hetty Feather (2015–20), CBBC
- Hex (2004–05), Sky 1
- His Dark Materials (2019–22), BBC, HBO
- Home Sweet Rome! (2023), CBBC
- House of Anubis (2011–13), Nickelodeon, TeenNick
- In the Flesh (2013–14), BBC Three
- In My Skin (2018–21), BBC Three
- The Innocents (2018), Netflix
- The Irregulars (2021), Netflix
- Island (1996), CITV
- It's a Sin (2021), Channel 4
- Jamie Johnson (2016–22), CBBC
- Jamie Johnson FC (2023–present), CBBC
- The Jensen Code (1973), ITV
- Jeopardy (2002–04), BBC One
- Joe All Alone (2018), CBBC
- Johnny Jarvis (1983), BBC One
- Just Act Normal (2025–present), BBC Three
- Just Us (1992–94), CITV
- Kappatoo (1990), CITV
- Killer Net (1998), Channel 4
- A Kind of Spark (2023–24), CBBC
- King Cinder (1977), BBC One
- King of the Castle (1977), ITV
- Kiss Me First (2018), Channel 4
- Knights of God (1987), ITV
- Ladhood (2019–22), BBC iPlayer
- The Lady Grace Mysteries (2026–present), CBBC
- The Last Bus (2022), Netflix
- Leonardo (2011–12), CBBC
- Life as I Know It (2010), Channel M
- Life Force (2000), CITV
- Lockwood & Co. (2023), Netflix
- The Lodge (1993), CITV
- The Lodge (2016–17), Disney Channel UK and Ireland
- Logan High (2018), BBC iPlayer
- Maggie (1981–82), BBC Two
- Malory Towers (2020–25), CBBC
- Marie Antoinette (2022–present), BBC Two
- Merlin (2008–12), BBC One
- M.I. High (2011–14), CBBC
- Misfits (2009–13), E4
- Moondial (1988), BBC One
- Mud (1994–95), CBBC
- My Left Nut (2020), BBC Three
- My Mad Fat Diary (2013–15), E4
- Mystic (2020–22), CBBC
- Nearly Famous (2007), E4
- Noah's Castle (1980), ITV
- Normal People (2020), BBC Three
- Noughts + Crosses (2020–22), BBC One
- Oasis (1993), CITV
- One Summer (1983), Channel 4
- Overshadowed (2017), BBC Three
- The Owl Service (1969–70), ITV
- Paradise Café (2009–11), CBBC
- Phoenix Hall (1990), CITV
- Phoenix Rise (2023–24), BBC Three
- Postcode (2011), CBBC
- Powers (2004), CBBC
- PREMature (2015), Community Channel
- Press Gang (1989–93), CITV
- Quest of Eagles (1979), ITV
- Quick Before They Catch Us (1966), BBC One
- Rebel Cheer Squad (2022), BBC iPlayer
- Red Rose (2022), BBC Three
- Renegade Nell (2024), Disney+
- The Rising (2022), Sky Max
- Roman Mysteries (2007–08), CBBC
- Rownd a Rownd (1995–present), S4C
- Runaway Bay (1992–93), CITV
- Scully (1984), Channel 4
- Seacht (2008–11), BBC Northern Ireland
- The Secret Diary of Adrian Mole, Aged 13¾ (1985), ITV
- Sex Education (2019–23), Netflix
- Shameless (2004–11), Channel 4
- Silverpoint (2022–23), CBBC
- Skins (2007–13), E4
- Sky (1975), ITV
- Somewhere Boy (2022), Channel 4
- The Sparticle Mystery (2011–15), CBBC
- Spirit Warriors (2010), BBC Two
- Streetwise (1989–92), CITV
- The Story of Tracy Beaker (2002–06), CBBC
- Sugar Rush (2005–06), Channel 4
- A Suitable Boy (2020), BBC One
- Summerhill (2008), CBBC, BBC Four
- Tell Me Everything (2022–24), ITVX
- Then You Run (2023), Sky Max
- This Town (2024), BBC One
- The Tomorrow People (1973–79), ITV
- The Tomorrow People (1992–95), CITV
- Timeslip (1970), ITV
- Time Riders (1991), CITV
- Top Boy: Summerhouse (2011–13), Channel 4
- Tracy Beaker Returns (2010–12), CBBC
- The Tribe (1999–2003), Channel 5
- Trinity (2009), ITV2
- Tucker's Luck (1983–85), BBC Two
- Two Weeks to Live (2020), Sky One
- Victoria (2016–19), ITV
- Video Nasty (2025–present), BBC Three, BBC Northern Ireland
- Wavelength (1997–98), CITV
- Waterloo Road (2006–15, 2022–present), BBC One
- The Well (2009), BBC Two
- West 10 LDN (2008), BBC Three
- What It Feels Like for a Girl (2025–present), BBC Three
- Wild Cherry (2025–present), BBC One
- Wizards vs Aliens (2012–14), CBBC
- Wolfblood (2012–17), CBBC
- World's End (2015), CBBC
- Wreck (2022–24), BBC Three
- Young Dracula (2006–08; 2011–14), CBBC
- Young Sherlock (2026–present), Amazon Prime Video
- Youngers (2013–14), E4
- Zero Chill (2021), Netflix

== United States ==
- 13 Reasons Why (2017–20), Netflix
- 21 Jump Street (1987–91), Fox
- The 100 (2014–20), The CW
- 90210 (2008–13), The CW
- Aaron Stone (2009–10), Disney XD
- ABC Afterschool Special (1972–97), ABC
- Alexa & Katie (2018–20), Netflix
- All American (2018–26), The CW
- All American: Homecoming (2022–24), The CW
- American Born Chinese (2023), Disney+
- American Dreams (2002–05), NBC
- American Horror Story: 1984 (2019), FX
- American Horror Story: Coven (2013–14), FX
- Andi Mack (2017–19), Disney Channel
- Animorphs (1998–2000), Nickelodeon
- Are You Afraid of the Dark? (2019–22), Nickelodeon
- As If (2002), UPN
- Attaway General (2020–23), Brat
- Atypical (2017–21), Netflix
- Awkward (2011–16), MTV
- The Baby-Sitters Club (1990), HBO
- The Baby-Sitters Club (2020–21), Netflix
- The Beautiful Life (2009), The CW
- Beautiful People (2005–06), ABC Family
- Becoming Elizabeth (2022), Starz
- The Bedford Diaries (2006), The WB
- Bel-Air (2022–25), Peacock
- Betty (2020–21), HBO
- The Best Times (1985), NBC
- Beverly Hills, 90210 (1990–2000), Fox
- Beyond the Break (2006–09), The N
- Big Shot (2021–22), Disney+
- The Birch (2019–21), Facebook Watch
- The Body (2026–present), Netflix
- Bone Chillers (1996), ABC
- Boots (2025), Netflix
- Breaker High (1997–98), UPN
- Breaking Away (1980–81), ABC
- The Buccaneers (2023–present), Apple TV+
- Buffy the Vampire Slayer (1997–2003), The WB, UPN
- Bunheads (2012–13), ABC Family
- Caitlin's Way (2000–02), Nickelodeon
- California Fever (1979), CBS
- Carrie (2026), Amazon Prime Video
- The Carrie Diaries (2013–14), The CW
- CBS Schoolbreak Special (1980–96), CBS
- Chambers (2019), Netflix
- Charmers (2021–22), Brat
- Chicken Girls (2017–23), Brat
- Chicken Girls: College Years (2022–23)
- Chilling Adventures of Sabrina (2018–20), Netflix
- Chucky (2021–2024), Syfy, USA Network
- Classified (2024), Amazon Freevee
- Cobra Kai (2018–25), YouTube Red, YouTube Premium, Netflix
- Colin in Black & White (2021), Netflix
- Class of '96 (1993), Fox
- Cloak & Dagger (2018–19), Freeform
- Club 57 (2019–20), Nickelodeon Latin America
- Clubhouse (2004–05), CBS
- Coven Academy (2026–present), Freeform
- The Crossover (2023), Disney+
- Crown Lake (2019–22), Brat
- Cruel Intentions (2024), Amazon Prime Video
- Cruel Summer (2021–23), Freeform
- Cursed (2020), Netflix
- Dare Me (2019–20), USA Network
- Dash & Lily (2020), Netflix
- David Makes Man (2019–21), OWN
- Dawson's Creek (1998–2003), The WB
- Daybreak (2019), Netflix
- Dead Boy Detectives (2024), Netflix
- Deadly Class (2019), Syfy
- Dead of Summer (2016), Freeform
- Dickinson (2019–21), Apple TV+
- Dirt (2018–19), Brat
- Don't Look Deeper (2020), Quibi
- Doogie Howser, M.D. (1989–93), ABC
- Doogie Kameāloha, M.D. (2021–23), Disney+
- Dwight in Shining Armor (2019–21), BYU TV
- East Los High (2013–17), Hulu
- Elle (2026–present), Amazon Prime Video
- Emerald Cove (1993–95), Disney Channel
- Euphoria (2019–26), HBO
- Everwood (2002–06), The WB
- Everything Sucks! (2018), Netflix
- Everything's Gonna Be Okay (2020–21), Freeform
- Fame (1982–87), NBC, syndication
- Famous in Love (2017–18), Freeform
- The Famous Jett Jackson (1998–2001), Disney Channel
- Fate: The Winx Saga (2021–22), Netflix
- Felicity (1998–2002), The WB
- Finding Carter (2014–15), MTV
- First Kill (2022), Netflix
- Five @ 305 (2018), Primo TV
- Five Points (2018–19), Facebook Watch
- Flight 29 Down (2005–07), Discovery Kids
- Forever (2025–present)
- The Fosters (2013–18), ABC Family, Freeform
- Foursome (2016–18), YouTube Red, YouTube Premium
- Freakish (2016–17), Hulu
- Freaks and Geeks (1999–2000), NBC
- Freeridge (2023), Netflix
- Freshman Dorm (1992), CBS
- Friday Night Lights (2006–11), NBC
- Gen V (2023–25), Amazon Prime Video
- Generation (2021), HBO Max
- The Get Down (2016–17), Netflix
- Get Real (1999–2000), Fox
- Ghostwriter (1992–95), PBS
- Ghostwriter (2019–22), Apple TV+
- The Gifted (2017–19), Fox
- Gigantic (2010–11), TeenNick
- Gilmore Girls (2000–07), The WB, The CW
- Ginny & Georgia (2021–present), Netflix
- The Girl in the Woods (2021), Peacock
- A Girl Named Jo (2018–19), Brat
- Glee (2009–15), Fox
- Glory Daze (2010–11), TBS
- Goosebumps (2023–25), Disney+, Hulu
- Gossip Girl (2007–12), The CW
- Gossip Girl (2021–23), HBO Max
- Gotham Knights (2023), The CW
- Grand Army (2020), Netflix
- Grease: Rise of the Pink Ladies (2023), Paramount+
- Greek (2007–11), ABC Family
- Greenhouse Academy (2017–20), Netflix
- Guidance (2015), go90
- Guilt (2016), Freeform
- Hanna (2019–21), Amazon Prime Video
- Harlan Coben's Shelter (2023), Amazon Prime Video
- Heathers (2018), Paramount Network
- Hellcats (2011–12), The CW
- Hidden Palms (2007), The CW
- High School (2022), Amazon Freevee
- High School Musical: The Musical: The Series (2019–23), Disney+
- His Dark Materials (2019–22), HBO
- Holly Hobbie (2018–22), Hulu
- Hollywood Heights (2012), Nick at Nite, TeenNick
- Home Before Dark (2020–21), Apple TV
- Home Sweet Rome! (2024), Max
- Huge (2010), ABC Family
- Hull High (1990), NBC
- Hysteria! (2024), Peacock
- I Am Frankie (2017–18), Nickelodeon
- I Am the Night (2019), TNT
- I Am Not Okay with This (2020), Netflix
- I Know What You Did Last Summer (2021), Amazon Prime Video
- I'm a Virgo (2023), Amazon Prime Video
- Impulse (2018–19), YouTube Premium
- In a Heartbeat (2000–01), Disney Channel
- Invincible (2021–present), Amazon Prime Video
- Insatiable (2018–19), Netflix
- The Institute (2025–present), MGM+
- Ironheart (2025), Disney Plus
- Jack & Bobby (2004–05), The WB
- James at 15 (1977–78), NBC
- Jane by Design (2012), ABC Family
- Joan of Arcadia (2003–05), CBS
- Julie and the Phantoms (2020), Netflix
- Just Add Magic (2015–19), Amazon Prime Video
- Just Add Magic: Mystery City (2020), Amazon Prime Video
- Just Deal (2000–02), NBC
- Just for Kicks (2006), Nickelodeon
- Kaya (2007), MTV
- Kyle XY (2006–09), ABC Family
- Legacies (2018–22), The CW
- Life as We Know It (2004–05), ABC
- Life by Ella (2022), Apple TV+
- Life Unexpected (2010–11), The CW
- Lifestories: Families in Crisis (1992–96), HBO
- Light as a Feather (2018–19), Hulu
- Lincoln Heights (2007–09), ABC Family
- Live Through This (2000–01), MTV
- Locke & Key (2020–22), Netflix
- Lost in Space (2018–21), Netflix
- lonelygirl15 (2006–08), YouTube
- Looking for Alaska (2019), Hulu
- Love, Victor (2020–22), Hulu
- The Lying Game (2011–13), ABC Family
- Make It or Break It (2009–12), ABC Family
- Malibu Shores (1996), NBC
- Me (2024), Apple TV+
- The Midnight Club (2022), Netflix
- Miracle's Boys (2005), The N
- Motherland: Fort Salem (2020–22), Freeform
- Motorheads (2025), Amazon Prime Video
- Ms. Marvel (2022), Disney+
- My Dead Ex (2018), go90
- My Life as Liz (2010–11), MTV
- My Life with the Walter Boys (2023–present), Netflix
- My So-Called Life (1994–95), ABC
- The Mystery Files of Shelby Woo (1996–98), Nickelodeon
- Nancy Drew (2019–23), The CW
- Naomi (2022), The CW
- Never Have I Ever (2020–23), Netflix
- Never Too Young (1965–66), ABC
- The New People (1969–70), ABC
- The New Ghostwriter Mysteries (1997), CBS
- The Nine Lives of Chloe King (2011), ABC Family
- The O.C. (2003–07), Fox
- Obsessed LV (2024), Obsessed LV app
- October Faction (2020), Netflix
- Off Campus (2026–present), Amazon Prime Video
- On My Block (2018–21), Netflix
- One of Us Is Lying (2021–22), Peacock
- One Piece (2023–present), Netflix
- One Tree Hill (2003–12), The WB, The CW
- Open Heart (2015), TeenNick
- Opposite Sex (2000), Fox
- The Originals (2013–18), The CW
- The Order (2019–20), Netflix
- Outer Banks (2020–26), Netflix
- The Outsiders (1990), Fox
- Overcompensating (2025–present), Amazon Prime Video
- Panic (2021), Amazon Prime Video
- Palmetto Pointe (2005), i
- Paper Dolls (1984), ABC
- Paper Girls (2022), Amazon Prime Video
- Party of Five (1994–2000), Fox
- Party of Five (2020), Freeform
- PEN15 (2019–21), Hulu
- Penelope (2024), Netflix
- Percy Jackson and the Olympians (2023–present), Disney+
- Perimeter (2024), BET+
- Phony (2026–present), Hulu
- Point Pleasant (2005), Fox
- The Politician (2019–20), Netflix
- Popular (1999–2001), The WB
- The Power (2023), Amazon Prime Video
- Powerhouse (1982–83), PBS
- Pretty Little Liars (2010–17), ABC Family, Freeform
- Pretty Little Liars (2022–2024), HBO Max, Max
- Pretty Little Liars: The Perfectionists (2019), Freeform
- Privileged (2008–09), The CW
- The Quad (2017–18), BET
- Ravenswood (2013–14), ABC Family
- Recovery Road (2016), Freeform
- Red Band Society (2014–15), Fox
- Red Oaks (2014–17), Amazon Prime Video
- Red Ruby (2019), Brat
- Reign (2013–17), The CW
- Reservation Dogs (2021–23), FX, Hulu
- Rise (2018), NBC
- Riverdale (2017–23), The CW
- Room 222 (1969–74), ABC
- Roswell (1999–2002), The WB, UPN
- Ruby and the Well (2022–24), BYU TV
- The Runarounds (2025), Amazon Prime Video
- Runaways (2017–19), Hulu
- Sacred Lies (2018–20), Facebook Watch
- School Spirits (2023–present), Paramount+
- Scream (2015–16), MTV
- The Secret Circle (2011–12), The CW
- The Secret Life of the American Teenager (2008–13), ABC Family
- The Secret of Lost Creek (1992), Disney Channel
- Secrets of Sulphur Springs (2021–23), Disney Channel
- The Secret World of Alex Mack (1994–98), Nickelodeon
- Shadow and Bone (2021–23), Netflix
- The Sex Lives of College Girls (2021–25), HBO Max
- Shadowhunters (2016–19), Freeform
- Shameless (2011–21), Showtime
- The Shannara Chronicles (2016–17), MTV, Spike
- The Shards (2026–present), FX
- Side Effects (2014), YouTube
- Sk8 (2001–02), NBC
- SKAM Austin (2018–19), Facebook Watch
- Skins (2011), MTV
- Smallville (2001–11), The WB, The CW
- So Weird (1999–2001), Disney Channel
- The Society (2019), Netflix
- South of Nowhere (2005–08), The N
- South West High (2026–present), Tubi
- Spinning Out (2020), Netflix
- Spellbound (2023–24), Hulu
- The Spiderwick Chronicles (2024), The Roku Channel
- Spooksville (2013–14), Hub Network
- Spider-Man: The New Animated Series (2003), MTV
- Stage Fright (2020), Brat
- Star (2016–19), Fox
- Star-Crossed (2014), The CW
- Star Trek: Starfleet Academy (2026–present), Paramount+
- Stargirl (2020–22), DC Universe, The CW
- Step Up (2018–22), YouTube Red, YouTube Premium, Starz
- Stereoscope (2020), Facebook Watch
- Sterling Point (2026–present), Amazon Prime Video
- Still Star-Crossed (2017), ABC
- Stranger Things (2016–25), Netflix
- The Summer I Turned Pretty (2022–25), Amazon Prime Video
- Summerland (2004–05), The WB
- Superboy (1988–92), syndication
- Supernatural Academy (2022), Peacock
- Surfside Girls (2022), Apple TV+
- Survive (2020), Quibi
- Swans Crossing (1992), syndication
- Swagger (2021–23), Apple TV+
- Sweet Valley High (1994–97), Fox
- Sweet/Vicious (2016–17), MTV
- Switched at Birth (2011–17), ABC Family, Freeform
- t@gged (2016–18), go90, Hulu
- Teen Angel (1989), Disney Channel
- Teen Wolf (2011–17), MTV
- Teenage Bounty Hunters (2020), Netflix
- Tell Me Lies (2022–26), Hulu
- The Testaments (2025–present), Hulu
- Theodosia (2022), HBO Max
- Time of Your Life (1999–2000), Fox
- Tiny Pretty Things (2020), Netflix
- Titans (2018–23), DC Universe, HBO Max
- The Tomorrow People (2013–14), The CW
- Total Eclipse (2018–20), Brat
- Tribes (1990), Fox
- Tower Prep (2010)‚ Cartoon Network
- Trinkets (2019–20), Netflix
- Turnt (2018), Facebook Watch
- TV 101 (1988–89), CBS
- Twisted (2013–14), ABC Family
- Undressed (1999–2002), MTV
- Unnatural History (2010), Cartoon Network
- The Unsettling (2019), Hulu
- Vampire Academy (2022), Peacock
- The Vampire Diaries (2009–17), The CW
- Veronica Mars (2004–07), UPN, The CW
- Vikki RPM (2017), Nickelodeon Latin America
- The Walking Dead: World Beyond (2020–21), AMC
- Warrior Nun (2020), Netflix
- Wayne (2019), YouTube Premium
- We Are Who We Are (2020), HBO
- We Were Liars (2025–present), Amazon Prime Video
- Wednesday (2022–present), Netflix
- When the Streetlights Go On (2020), Quibi
- The White Shadow (1978–81), CBS
- Whiz Kids (1983–84), CBS
- Wildfire (2005–08), ABC Family
- The Wilds (2020–22), Amazon Prime Video
- Wireless (2020), Quibi
- Wolf Pack (2023), Paramount+
- XO, Kitty (2023–present), Netflix
- Yellowjackets (2021–present), Showtime
- Young Americans (2000), The WB
- Youth & Consequences (2018), YouTube Red
- Zac & Mia (2017–19), go90, Hulu
- Zoe Valentine (2019), Brat

== Venezuela ==
- A puro corazón (2015–16), Televen
- A todo corazón (1997–98), Venevisión
- Amor urbano (2009), Venevisión
- La banda (2011), Boomerang
- Besos robados (2004), Venevisión
- Con toda el alma (2005–06), Venevisión
- Corazones extremos (2011), Venevisión
- Hoy te vi (1998–99), RCTV
- Los muchachos de la acera de enfrente (2008), TVes
- Motivados por la música (2011), TVes
- NPS: No puede ser (2011), Venevisión, Boomerang
- Pura pinta (2007), RCTV
- ¡Qué clase de amor! (2009), Venevisión
- Somos tú y yo (2007–09), Venevisión, Boomerang
- Túkiti, crecí de una (2006–07), RCTV

== Other countries ==
- Cóte d'Ivoire – MTV Shuga: Babi (2019–21) YouTube, RTI
- Croatia – Sram (2024–present), HRT 1
- Czech Republic – 4teens (2011), ČT1, Czech Television
- Ecuador – Sin límites (2000–01), Ecuavisa
- Egypt – Meen Qal?! (2022), Shahid
- Estonia – Ühikarotid (2010–12), Kanal 2
- Iran – Happiness (2021–present), Arte, YouTube
- Jamaica – Real Friends (2016–19), TVJ
- Lithuania – Neskubėk gyventi (2008–09), LRT
- Slovakia – Nový život (2020–21), TV JOJ
- Switzerland – Les indociles (2023), RTS
- Uruguay – Dance! La fuerza del corazón (2011), Channel 10
- Vietnam – Kính vạn hoa (2004–08), HTV
- Zambia – Tikula (2022), SKY Girls Zed

== See also ==
- Teen drama
- Teen sitcom (List of teen sitcoms)
- Teen films (List of teen films)
- Teen pop
- Teen magazine (List of teen magazines)
