= Rumors (disambiguation) =

Rumors (or rumours) are pieces of purportedly true information that circulate without substantiating evidence.

rumors, or rumours may also refer to:

== Literature ==
- Rumors (play), a play by Neil Simon
- Rumors: A Luxe Novel, a novel by Anna Godbersen

== Music ==
- Rumors (album), a 1976 album by Arrogance
- Rumours (album), a 1977 album by Fleetwood Mac
- "Rumors", a 1962 song by Johnny Crawford
- "Rumours", a 1973 song by the band Hot Chocolate
- "Rumors" (Timex Social Club song), 1986
- "Rumours", 2001 song by Damage from the album Since You've Been Gone
- "Rumors" (Lindsay Lohan song), 2004
- "Rumours (Digi Digi)", a 2006 single by Inusa Dawuda
- "Rumors", a song from Adam Lambert's 2015 album The Original High
- "Rumors", a song from Ava Max's 202 album Heaven & Hell
- "Rumors" (Lizzo song), 2021
- "Rumours", a song by Kings of Convenience from the 2021 album Peace or Love
- "Rumors" (Gucci Mane song), 2022
- "Rumours", a 2023 song by Mirror

== Film and television ==
- Rumors (film), a 1943 cartoon
- Rumours (1947 film), a French crime drama film
- Rumours (2024 film), a dark comedy film
- Rumours (TV series), a Canadian sitcom
- "Rumours" (Glee), a 2011 television episode
- "Rumours" (Green Wing), a 2004 television episode
- "Rumors" (The Suite Life of Zack & Cody), a 2005 television episode
- Rykter, a 2020s Norwegian teen drama television series, known by the name 'Rumours' in English.

== See also ==
- Rumor (disambiguation)
