= Grass roots (disambiguation) =

Grass roots may refer to:

== Botanical ==
- Literally, the roots of grass

== Business ==
- Grass Roots (company), a British company
- Grass Roots Books, a British bookshop

== Film and television ==
- Grass Roots (TV series), an Australian television series that ran from 2000 and 2003
- Grassroots (TV series), a South African television series that ran from 2019
- Grass Roots (TV movie) a 1992 made-for-television film directed by Jerry London
- Grass Roots (film), an upcoming claymation film based on the Fabulous Furry Freak Brothers comic
- Grassroots (film), a 2012 film

== Literary ==
- Grass Roots (novel), the fourth novel in the Will Lee series by Stuart Woods

== Music ==
- The Grass Roots, a U.S. rock & roll band
- Grassroots (album), a 1994 album by 311
- Grass Roots (Andrew Hill album), 1968
- Grass Roots, a 2002 album by Panjabi MC
- Grassroots, a 1996 EP by Tricky
- Grass Roots (Atban Klann album)
- Grass Roots: The Best of the New Grass Revival, an album by New Grass Revival
- Grass Roots (Grass Roots album), 2012
- The Finger Lakes GrassRoots Festival of Music and Dance, a roots music festival held in Trumansburg, New York
- Da Grassroots, a Canadian hip-hop production team

== Political ==
- Grassroots, a political movement driven "from below" by the fundamental constituents of a community.
- Grassroots democracy, a political design
- Grassroots (organization), a Western New York political organization
- Grassroots Party, US
