= Rumor (disambiguation) =

A rumor (or rumour) is a piece of purportedly true information that circulates without substantiating evidence.

Rumor, rumor, or rumour may also refer to:

== People ==
- Mariano Rumor (1915-1990), Italian politician

== Arts, entertainment, and media ==
=== Music ===
==== Groups ====
- The Rumour (British band), Graham Parker's backup band
- The Rumour (New Zealand band), formed in 1966

==== Albums ====
- The Rumour (album), a 1988 album by Olivia Newton-John
- The Rumor (album), a 2002 album by Before Braille

==== Songs ====
- "Rumor" (song), a 2018 song by Lee Brice
- "The Rumour" (song), a 1988 song by Olivia Newton-John
- "Rumor", a song by Kard from the EP Hola Hola, 2017
- "Rumour", a song by Rock Goddess from the album Young and Free, 1987
- "Rumour", a song by Bel Canto from the album Magic Box, 1996
- "The Rumor", a song by the Band from the album Stage Fright, 1970

=== Television ===
- Rumour, a 1970 television film directed by Mike Hodges
- Rumor, a character from The Batman (TV series)
- The Rumor, a character from the comic The Umbrella Academy and The Umbrella Academy (TV series)
- "The Rumour" (Only When I Laugh), a 1979 television episode

== Other uses ==
- LG Rumor, a cellular mobile phone
- Pheme, the Greek goddess for fame and gossip, also called Rumor

== See also ==
- Rumer Godden
- Rumer Willis
- Rumors (disambiguation)
