= A Little White Lie (TV series) =

Indonesian teen drama television series

- Genre: Teen drama
- Based on: A Little White Lie by Titish A. K.
- Screenplay by: Cassandra Massardi
- Directed by: Sondang Pratama
- Starring: Jerome Kurnia; Callista Arum; Junior Roberts; Naura Hakim; Shania Gracia
- Theme music composer: Roby Satria
- Opening theme: "Kamu yang Pertama" performed by Geisha
- Ending theme: "Kamu yang Pertama" performed by Geisha
- Composer: Andhika Triyadi
- Country of origin: Indonesia
- Original language: Indonesian
- No. of seasons: 1
- No. of episodes: 8

Production
- Executive producers: Lionel Chng; Kemas M. Fadhli; Lesley Simpson; Evy Ruslie
- Producers: Agung P. D. Nugroho; Oswin Bonifanz
- Cinematography: Catur Rizky Saputro
- Editor: Iska Sutardi
- Camera setup: Multi-camera
- Running time: ±45 minutes
- Production company: Unlimited Production

Original release
- Network: Netflix
- Release: July 15, 2026
- Network: MAXstream
- Release: July 22, 2026

A Little White Lie adalah Indonesian which premiered on July 15, 2026, on Netflix and July 22, 2026, on Maxstream, based on the novel of the same name by Titish A. K. The series is directed by Sondang Pratama and stars Jerome Kurnia, Callista Arum, and Junior Roberts.

== Plot ==
Ocha, a former high-achieving student, is facing a difficult time after being laid off.

In the midst of her situation, Ocha attends an elementary school reunion held at the Gala Hotel, owned by Adit, her senior. Besides meeting old friends who are now successful, Ocha also wants to express her gratitude to the mysterious figure who for years sent her encouraging letters after she lost both of her parents.

At the reunion, Ocha reunites with Bintang, the owner of a branding consulting firm she has secretly admired. Also present are Kian and Quinn, a seemingly harmonious young couple; Jeannette, who has a career as a model and influencer; Harlan, who comes from a wealthy family; and Shira, her old friend.

A new opportunity arises when Adit faces a reputation crisis at the Gala Hotel. His father, Ben, threatens to take over the hotel if Adit fails to restore the company's image. To overcome this, Adit enlists Bintang's help in a rebranding strategy.

Bintang then invites Ocha to join his company. Although she is looking for a job, Ocha hides her financial situation. She even claims to require the latest model of cell phone as a requirement for employment. That small lie became the beginning of a series of secrets that turned out to be shared by those around her.

Ocha then discovered that Harlan, who had always been known to come from a wealthy family, actually worked as a meat seller at the market. In return for keeping her secret, Harlan lent Ocha his cell phone so she could continue her work.

Meanwhile, Ocha and Bintang's rebranding strategy successfully re-established Adit and the Gala Hotel. However, their relationship began to change when it was revealed that the person who had been sending Ocha the encouraging letters was not Bintang, but Adit.

The conflict worsened when Kian and Jeannette's affair was uncovered, leading Quinn to file for divorce. At the same time, Ocha expressed her feelings for Bintang, but Bintang rejected her, refusing to ruin their friendship.

Another problem arose when Adit learned that Ben was suspected of being involved in the hit-and-run that killed Ocha's parents. Meanwhile, Bintang's company was on the verge of bankruptcy, forcing him to borrow money from Ben, who then demanded that Bintang bring Adit down as a condition for his help.

Bintang ultimately chose to maintain the friendship, even though this decision resulted in the departure of all her clients. Ocha is disappointed after discovering that Bintang has only been pretending to be successful. Her disappointment deepens when she learns that Aunt Fatma has been receiving financial assistance from Ben to support her life.

Ocha's journey reaches a turning point after the news of Shira's death. Reuniting with her old friends makes Ocha realize that everyone has their own wounds and secrets.

At the end of the story, Ocha reconciles with Aunt Fatma and helps her realize her dream of opening a bakery. She also tries to reunite Quinn and Kian for the sake of their child's future.

Ultimately, Ocha must make the biggest choice of her life: between Adit, who has been secretly watching over her through secret letters, and Bintang, the figure she has long loved.

== Cast ==
- Callista Arum as Ocha
- Junior Roberts as Bintang
- Jerome Kurnia as Adit
- Shania Gracia as Shira
- Adel Reva as Quinn
- Ciccio Manassero as Kian
- Naura Hakim as Jeanette
- Teuku Rizky as Harlan
- TJ as Tante Fatma
- Donny Damara as Om Ben

== Episodes ==
=== Series overview ===
Season	No. of episodes	Originally broadcast (Indonesia)	
Season	No. of episodes	First aired	Last aired
1	8	22 July 2026	

=== Season 1 ===
No.	Title	Directed by	Written by	Original release date
1	"Reunion for Love and Nostalgia"	Sondang Pratama	Unknown	22 July 2026
Initially feeling insecure after being laid off, Ocha attends her school reunion and reunites with the boy she's been in love with, Bintang. Despite the party's cheerful atmosphere, Ocha doesn't realize that all of her friends are secretly keeping secrets, especially Adit.
2	"Reality and Expectations"	Sondang Pratama	Unknown	22 July 2026
Ocha begins to pursue her long-held dream, collaborating with Bintang. Their first project is rebranding Adit's image. Meanwhile, Ocha discovers Harlan's true side of life, while Kian's small incident snowballs.
3	"The Open Veil"	Sondang Pratama	Unknown	22 July 2026
A lavish charity gala invites Ocha to participate in a public documentary as Adit's girlfriend. Meanwhile, Ocha must choose between keeping a secret she knows or revealing it for the sake of loyalty. Adit begins to be haunted by an old secret that connects him to Ocha's childhood tragedy.
4	"The Greatest Treasure Is Time"	Sondang Pratama	Unknown	22 July 2026
Bintang is in a moral dilemma, between personal ambition or loyalty, meanwhile Shira's secret makes Ocha realize, she must have the courage to express her feelings before it's too late.
5	"All in sight"	Sondang Pratama	Unknown	22 July 2026
Ocha discovers Bintang and Adit's secret, which gives her her biggest heartbreak yet. Will Ocha lose her two best friends forever?
6	"Who Can Be Trusted"	Sondang Pratama	Unknown	22 July 2026
The recognition of a past tragedy shattered all the values Ocha had held dear. Adit made an extreme decision that would ultimately ruin his future in the name of atonement.
7	"Are Happy Endings Real?"	Sondang Pratama	Unknown	22 July 2026
Amidst the happiness among her friends, tragedy strikes, teaching Ocha the meaning of forgiveness and self-respect. Ocha resolves to face her greatest enemy, no matter the cost.
8	"Censorship of Honesty"	Sondang Pratama	Unknown	22 July 2026
Ocha discovers Bintang and Adit's Ocha must come to terms with her trauma and decide who she should choose: the person who has always been there for her in the past, or the one who can help her build a future. An ending about honesty, redemption, and the courage to open her heart.

== Productions ==
=== Casting ===
Callista Arum was confirmed to play female lead, Ocha. Junior Roberts was selected to play male lead, Bintang. Shania Gracia was chosen to play Shira.
