= Samuel (2026 TV series) =

- Genre: Teen drama
- Created by: Manoj Punjabi
- Based on: Samuel by Ita Kurniawati
- Written by: Nala Prana; Deliesza Tamara
- Screenplay by: Hanan Novianti
- Directed by: Asep Kusdinar
- Starring: Fadi Alaydrus; Saskia Chadwick
- Theme music composer: Alvin Callysta
- Opening theme: "Yang Terbaik" by Trio Wijaya
- Ending theme: "Yang Terbaik" by Trio Wijaya
- Country of origin: Indonesia
- Original language: Indonesian
- No. of seasons: 1
- No. of episodes: 8

Production
- Executive producers: Jeff Han; Juan Xiang; Febriamy Hutapea
- Producer: Manoj Punjabi
- Cinematography: Ivan Anwal Pane
- Editor: Gita Miaji
- Camera setup: Multi-camera
- Running time: 80 minutes
- Production company: MD Entertainment

Original release
- Network: WeTV
- Release: 12 June – 25 July 2026

Samuel is an Indonesian television teen drama series produced by MD Entertainment which aired on 12 June 2026 on WeTV. This series is based on the novel of the same title by Ita Kurniawati. It stars Fadi Alaydrus and Saskia Chadwick.

== Cast ==
- Fadi Alaydrus as Samuel Erlangga
- Saskia Chadwick as Azzura Anastasia
- Emyrrazan as Raskal Syahreza
- Dimas Putra as Areksa Dirgantara
- Azela Putri as Queen Illona Ladeika
- Endy Arfian as Canva Narendra
- Rafly Altama as Farzan Tanubrata
- Andy William as Marvin Algara
- Yusuf Kartiko as Marvel Algara
- Indra Brasco as David
- Cut Tari as Kiara
- Jordan as Stevan
- Irgi Fahrezi as Jonathan
- Nadia Mulya as Fiessa Anara
- Reza A. Fahlevi as Ari
- Vincent Leenders as Redi
- Andrew James Walton as Sadam
- Kimberly Angela as Kayla
- Sharon Sahertian as Arin
- Gabriella Quinlyn as Sekar
- Jessica Shaina as Ameyra Khalisa
- Oce Permatasari as Bi Yanti
- Rezca Syam as Herman
- Abun Hadi as Sulistyo
- Tomy Babap as Pak Rusdi
- Kayla Ardina Asiyah as young Azura
- Madin as Romi
- Khalif Al Juna as young Samuel
- Ayu Inten as Bu Astuti

== Production ==
=== Development ===
The series was officially announced by WeTV in February 2026.

=== Casting ===
Cut Tari to join the series, and marks her OTT debut.
