= Ciccio Manassero =

Indonesian singer and actor (born 1995)

- Born: 26 October 1995 (age 30); Malang, Indonesia
- Citizenship: Indonesian
- Occupations: Singer; Actor
- Years active: 2000–present
- Height: 180 cm (71 in)

Massimiliano Manassero (born 26 October 1995) is an Indonesian actor and former child singer.

== Early life ==
Manassero was born in Malang to an Italian father Cesare and Indonesian mother Sabrina Marianti. Through his father, Manassero grew up supporting Inter Milan from when he was four years old. Manassero graduated from London School of Public Relations (LSPR). He is a Christian.

== Career ==
Manassero began his career as a child singer in 2000 with the song "Kebelet Pipis" composed by Papa T. Bob. Initially, he almost gave up after growing tiredness in the entertainment industry, wanting to live a normal life. However, Manassero began reigniting his entertainment passion at the age of 17.

== Personal life ==
Manassero was in relationship with Maria Rosalia Yola Detta, one of the six finalists of Indonesian Idol in 2012. The couple met when they were filming for Kesurupan. Manassero and Detta separated in 2015, after which the former was briefly in relationship with Michelle Joan, one of the actors in Ganteng Ganteng Serigala.

In 2022, Manassero was in relationship with Indonesian actress and model Natasha Ryder, who is the younger sister of Kimberly Ryder. They separated in early 2023.

== Filmography ==
Year	Title	Role	Notes	Reference(s)
2004	Nirmala	Tio		
2014	Ganteng Ganteng Serigala	Wingky		
2024	Ayo Balikan	Eden		
TBA	Rumah Singgah		Short film	
