= Love's in Sight! =

Japanese manga series

- First tankōbon volume cover

ヤンキー君と白杖ガール (Yankī-kun to Hakujō Gāru)
- Genre: Romantic comedy; Coming-of-age
- Manga
- Written by: Uoyama
- Published by: Media Factory
- English publisher: NA: Viz Media
- Imprint: MF Comics
- Magazine: Niconico Seiga; Pixiv; Manga Hack
- Original run: June 24, 2018 – February 26, 2022
- Volumes: 8
- Television drama

Koi Desu! Yankee-kun to Hakujō Girl
- Directed by: Hidemi Uchida; Shunsuke Kariyama
- Produced by: Masahiro Mori; Reina Oda; Kaori Suzuki
- Written by: Yūko Matsuda
- Music by: Masahiro Tokuda
- Original network: NNS (Nippon TV)
- Original run: October 6, 2021 – December 15, 2021
- Episodes: 10

Love's in Sight! (Japanese: ヤンキー君と白杖ガール, Hepburn: Yankī-kun to Hakujō Gāru; "Delinquent and the White Cane Girl") is a Japanese four-panel manga series written and illustrated by Uoyama. It was serialized online via Niconico Seiga and Pixiv from June 2018 to February 2022, with its chapters collected into eight tankōbon volumes. A television drama adaptation aired from October to December 2021.

== Media ==
=== Manga ===
Written and illustrated by Uoyama, Love's in Sight! began serialization on Niconico Seiga and Pixiv on June 24, 2018. It also began publication on the Manga Hack website in August 2018. The series ended serialization on February 26, 2022. Media Factory compiled the chapters into eight tankōbon volumes, published from January 2019 to May 2022.

In June 2022, Viz Media announced that it will publish the series in English starting in Q2 2023.

==== Volumes ====
No.	Original release date	Original ISBN	English release date	English ISBN
1	January 23, 2019	978-4-04-065485-0	April 18, 2023	978-1-9747-3681-2
2	June 22, 2019	978-4-04-065831-5	June 20, 2023	978-1-9747-3748-2
3	November 22, 2019	978-4-04-064253-6	August 15, 2023	978-1-9747-3754-3
4	June 23, 2020	978-4-04-064619-0	October 17, 2023	978-1-9747-3755-0
5	December 23, 2020	978-4-04-064910-8	December 19, 2023	978-1-9747-3756-7
6	July 21, 2021	978-4-04-680476-1	March 19, 2024	978-1-9747-3757-4
7	December 23, 2021	978-4-04-680952-0	June 11, 2024	978-1-9747-3758-1
8	May 23, 2022	978-4-04-681443-2	September 10, 2024	978-1-9747-4883-9

=== Drama ===
A television drama adaptation was announced in July 2021, starring Hana Sugisaki. Titled Koi Desu! Yankee-kun to Hakujō Girl (恋です！〜ヤンキー君と白杖ガール〜), the series is directed by Hidemi Uchida and Shunsuke Kariyama, based on a screenplay by Yūko Matsuda. Masahiro Tokuda composed the music, while Masahiro Mori, Reina Oda, and Kaori Suzuki served as the series' producers. It aired on Nippon TV's NNS network from October 6 to December 15, 2021. The theme song is "Kotae Awase" (こたえあわせ) by Juju.

A three-episode spin-off drama, titled Kurokawa Morio, Arubaito Sagashitemasu! (黒川森生、アルバイト探してますっ！), was released on Hulu from November 10 to December 8, 2021.

A Malaysian adaptation, titled Dari Mata Turun Ke Hati, was announced in August 2024 as a deal between Nippon TV and Astro. The series premiered on Astro Ria on August 12, 2024.

== Reception ==
In 2019, Love's in Sight! ranked fourteenth at the fifth Next Manga Awards in the web manga category. In 2022, the series was nominated at the 46th Kodansha Manga Awards in the general category. In 2023, the series was listed by the New York Public Library among its Best Books for Teens that year.
