= Grassroots (TV series) =

South African drama series

- Genre: Teen drama
- Created by: Khayelihle Dom Gumede; Tony Miyambo; Brian van Niekerk; Asher Sholtz
- Starring: Dumisani Dube; Justin Strydom; Lerato Mvelase; Lihleli Tini; Luzuko Nkqeto; Oros Mampofu; Sibulele Gcilitshana; Zikhona Sodlaka
- Country of origin: South Africa
- Original languages: English; Xhosa; Zulu

Production
- Producers: CMP; Helen Smit
- Running time: 22-24 minutes Multichoice

Original release
- Network: One Magic; Showmax
- Release: 19 July – 11 October 2019

Grassroots is a South African teen drama series created and produced by Clive Morris Productions. It is an M-Net original production for Multichoice and DStv's One Magic and is a co-production with Naspers subscription video-on-demand service Showmax. The drama tells a coming-of-age story of two boys from the rural Eastern Cape who relocate to a boarding school in Johannesburg to follow their dreams of being rugby stars.

== Plot ==
The drama tells the story of Monwabisi and Asanda, two boys from Butterworth whose families had a close business relationship and friendship. The tragic death of Monwabisi's father in the presence of Asanda's father on a construction site tears the families apart as suspicions of foul play come to surface.

In their late teens, Asanda is a rugby obsessed boy who has disappointed the traditionalist and community leader by turning his back on the initiation ceremony to play a match for his school team. In contrast, Monwabisi has completed the initiation ceremony, however he feels conflicted without his father by his side to guide him and as a result he struggles to become the man he must be. The two boys must put their differences aside to face their common foes.

According to the writers, the story is richly woven with the Xhosa traditions and explores the ageless themes of manhood. The story takes a modern-day approach on traditional customs and expectations.
