= Rykter =

Norwegian teen drama television series

- Also known as: Rumors
- Genre: Teen drama
- Created by: Christoffer V. Ebbesen
- Developed by: Christoffer V. Ebbesen
- Written by: Christoffer V. Ebbesen; Sigrid Clementine Kolbjørnsen; Tron-Petter Aunaas
- Directed by: Kjersti Steinsbø; Andreas Søfteland Milde; Nina Knag
- Starring: Benjamin Ebbesen; Teo Tomczuk; Alisa Sussmann; Sisilja Garen
- Music by: Askjell Solstrand
- Country of origin: Norway
- Original language: Norwegian
- No. of seasons: 4
- No. of episodes: 60

Production
- Executive producer: Eldar Nakken
- Producers: Marie Fuglestein Lægreid; Linda Bolstad Strønen; Eldar Nakken
- Production locations: Øygarden, Norway; Bergen, Norway
- Cinematography: Pål Rønnevik; Øyvind Svanes Lunde
- Editors: Geir Ørnholt; Kaj Arne Svanaes-Soot; Elisabeth Berthelsen
- Running time: 8-12 minutes
- Production companies: NRK3; Mothership Entertainment; NDR
- Budget: 18,061,936 Norwegian kroner

Original release
- Network: NRK3
- Release: 22 September 2022 – 12 June 2025

Rykter (English: Rumours) is a Norwegian teen drama television series about the life of Erik Nielsen, who had to move to the fictional island Vesterøy. It is produced by NRK3, which is part of the Norwegian public broadcaster NRK.

== Premise ==
Rykter revolves around Erik Nielsen who needed to leave Bergen because he beat up one of his football teammates and was caught by the police. He moves to the fictional island Vesterøy to live with his mother where he tries to hide the reason why he had to move before his new friends.

The first season covers the problems Erik faces with integrating into the small community as well as the relationship between Mathias and Sara. Problems arise when Mathias plan for his future doesn't align anymore with the plan of Sara, which leads to Mathias and Sara growing apart while Sara and Erik grow closer together. This leads to multiple problems including Sara's relationship with Thea, her best friend, who tries to take revenge on Erik with Mathias together.

The second season continues seamlessly with the story line. Mathias now tries to befriend Erik and tries to integrate him into his friend group but faces backlash from Felix his best friend. Felix attempts to force Mathias to choose between Erik and him.

The second season hints at Mathias' growing attraction to Erik, and at the end of the season, Mathias bestows a very long kiss on Erik; Erik does not actively respond, but does not pull away either.

At the beginning of Season 3, Mathias has an erotic dream concerning Erik, and Erik remarks that he enjoyed the kiss. However, their relationship remains unexplored for the rest of the season. Although it's clear that Mathias is fully aware of his same-sex feelings toward Erik, it's unclear what Erik is thinking or feeling.

The series deals with the influence of rumours (Norwegian: Rykter) on mental health and social standing. The impact of the beforementioned social standing is also addressed. Alcohol and drug consumption as well as sexual harassment are also addressed throughout the series.

== Characters ==
=== Main ===
- Benjamin Ebbesen as John Erik Nielsen (main; season 1): a new student in Vesterøy who is struggling to adapt to his new life and making new friends, after having to leave Bergen because he beat someone up.
- Teo Tomczuk as Mathias (main; season 2): a student and lifelong resident of Vesterøy who has struggles in his relationship with Sara as well as with his parents because he wants to pursue his dream not follow the plan of his parents and Sara, where he would take over Vesterøy Seafood. His growing attraction to Erik results in a very passionate kiss with Erik at the end of season 2.
- Martin Storebø Koh as Felix (main; season 3): a student and Mathias' best friend who has problems with Mathias and Erik growing closer together and struggles with adapting to the new life situation since Erik moved to Verstrøy
- Serian Jeng as Olivia (main; season 4)
- Alisa Sussmann as Sara: a student and lifelong resident of Vesterøy who wants to study in Bergen to become a doctor but struggles with finding her real dream in life
- Sissilja Garen as Thea: a student who manages the Snapchat Channel Vesterøy Exposed and is very keen on keeping her social status as a rich child of a lawyer in London but faces difficulties when reality catches up

=== Recurring ===
- Tobias Vassnes as Elias
- Jon Kennedy Dushime Niyokindi as Nathaniel
- Negusse Behre as Moses
- Ole Jakob Sunde as Anders
- Martin Bøstrand as Alexander
- Mathea Onarheim Grønnevik as Synnøve
- Simran Skulberg de Souza as Maira
- Dorthe Bakken as Katrine-Marie
- Helene Iversen as Louise
- Emil Jonasdal Johannessen as Adrian
- Aymen Said as Mohammed
- Jessica Johnsen as Ragnhild
- Juliana Fagertveit Haukedal as Yara
- Siv Torin Knudsen Petersen as Sigrid
- Heine Totland as Olav
- Sigmund Hovind as Christoffer
- Astrid Bergtun Elnes as Elisabeth
- Amy Black Ndiaye as Sandra
- Dominika Natalia Minkacz Sira as Jolanta

=== Guest ===
- Leo Ajkic as the boxing trainer of Sara
- Kjell Arne Kjærgård as Onkel Eldar
- Svein Harry Hauge as Jarle Svensson
- Desta Marie Beeder as Marie
- Jonas Veland as Andy
- Marcus Kabelo Møll Mosele as Footballtrainer
- Andreas Søfteland Milde as wheelchair user
- Jone Holmelid as Sondre
- Jessica Johnsen as Ragnhild
- Krister Wiberg as garbage picker
- Erna Solberg

=== Double ===
- Henrik Åsheim as Mathias in Season 1 Episode 12
- Henrik Kalgraff as Mathias in Season 1 Episode 13

== Episodes ==
=== Series overview ===
Season	Episodes	Originally released	Network
1	15	September 22, 2022	NRK TV
2	15	February 24, 2023	NRK TV
3	15	August 19, 2024	NRK TV
4	15	April 28, 2025	NRK TV

=== Season 1 (2022) ===
No. overall	No. in season	Original Title	Title	Directed by	Written by	Original release date	Runtime
1	1	"Snitches gir vi stitches"	Snitches get stitches	Kjersti Steinsbø	Christoffer V. Ebbesen; Sigrid Clementine Kolbjørnsen	September 22, 2022	9min
2	2	"Vært med i noe?"	Participated in something?	Kjersti Steinsbø	Christoffer V. Ebbesen; Sigrid Clementine Kolbjørnsen	September 22, 2022	11min
3	3	"Skal vi slå opp?"	Should we break up?	Kjersti Steinsbø	Christoffer V. Ebbesen; Sigrid Clementine Kolbjørnsen	September 22, 2022	8min
4	4	"Du skal kysse meg"	You are going to kiss me	Kjersti Steinsbø	Christoffer V. Ebbesen; Sigrid Clementine Kolbjørnsen	September 22, 2022	9min
5	5	"Han tenner på katter!"	He is turned on by cats!	Kjersti Steinsbø	Christoffer V. Ebbesen; Sigrid Clementine Kolbjørnsen	September 26, 2022	9min
6	6	"Du kveler meg"	You suffocate me	Kjersti Steinsbø	Christoffer V. Ebbesen; Sigrid Clementine Kolbjørnsen	September 26, 2022	9min
7	7	"Kongen er singel igjen"	The king is single again	Kjersti Steinsbø	Christoffer V. Ebbesen; Sigrid Clementine Kolbjørnsen	September 29, 2022	8min
8	8	"Skal jeg redde deg?"	Shall I save you?	Andreas Søfteland Milde	Christoffer V. Ebbesen; Sigrid Clementine Kolbjørnsen	October 3, 2022	10min
9	9	"Hun har vært utro"	She has been unfaithful	Kjersti Steinsbø	Christoffer V. Ebbesen; Sigrid Clementine Kolbjørnsen	October 6, 2022	10min
10	10	"Falske jævla hore!"	Fake fucking whore!	Andreas Søfteland Milde	Christoffer V. Ebbesen; Sigrid Clementine Kolbjørnsen	October 10, 2022	10min
11	11	"Vi er IKKE sammen"	We are NOT together	Kjersti Steinsbø	Christoffer V. Ebbesen; Sigrid Clementine Kolbjørnsen	October 13, 2022	10min
12	12	"Har jeg bare noia?"	Am I just freaked out?	Andreas Søfteland Milde	Christoffer V. Ebbesen; Sigrid Clementine Kolbjørnsen	October 17, 2022	8min
13	13	"Ikke lyv til meg!"	Don't lie to me!	Kjersti Steinsbø	Christoffer V. Ebbesen; Sigrid Clementine Kolbjørnsen	October 20, 2022	8min
14	14	"Du kan ikke komme!"	You cannot come	Kjersti Steinsbø	Christoffer V. Ebbesen; Sigrid Clementine Kolbjørnsen	October 24, 2022	8min
15	15	"La oss ta psykoen!"	Let's get the psycho!	Kjersti Steinsbø	Christoffer V. Ebbesen; Sigrid Clementine Kolbjørnsen	October 27, 2022	9min

=== Season 2 (2023) ===
No. overall	No. in season	Original Title	Title	Directed by	Written by	Original release date	Runtime
16	1	"Du må stoppe dem!"	You have to stop them!	Kjersti Steinsbø	Christoffer V. Ebbesen; Sigrid Clementine Kolbjørnsen	February 24, 2023	8min
17	2	"Ingenting skjedde"	Nothing happened	Kjersti Steinsbø	Christoffer V. Ebbesen; Sigrid Clementine Kolbjørnsen	February 27, 2023	8min
18	3	"Det er oss eller han"	It's us or him	Sigrid Clementine Kolbjørnsen	Tron-Petter Aunaas; Christoffer V. Ebbesen; Sigrid Clementine Kolbjørnsen	March 3, 2023	9min
19	4	"Ikke uten deg, kompis"	Not without you, buddy	Sigrid Clementine Kolbjørnsen	Tron-Petter Aunaas; Christoffer V. Ebbesen; Sigrid Clementine Kolbjørnsen	March 6, 2023	10min
20	5	"Er det deg?"	Is that you?	Andreas Søfteland Milde	Christoffer V. Ebbesen; Sigrid Clementine Kolbjørnsen	March 10, 2023	10min
21	6	"Gidder ikke noe kødd"	Don't want no bullshit	Kjersti Steinsbø	Christoffer V. Ebbesen; Sigrid Clementine Kolbjørnsen	March 13, 2023	10min
22	7	"Hun lyver om alt!"	She is lying about everything!	Kjersti Steinsbø	Christoffer V. Ebbesen; Sigrid Clementine Kolbjørnsen	March 17, 2023	9min
23	8	"Nå vet du det"	Now you know	Kjersti Steinsbø	Christoffer V. Ebbesen; Sigrid Clementine Kolbjørnsen	March 20, 2023	10min
24	9	"Føkk deg, Felix!"	Fuck you, Felix!	Nina Knag	Christoffer V. Ebbesen; Sigrid Clementine Kolbjørnsen	March 24, 2023	10min
25	10	"Alle venter på deg"	Everyone is waiting for you	Kjersti Steinsbø	Christoffer V. Ebbesen; Sigrid Clementine Kolbjørnsen	March 27, 2023	11min
26	11	"Hvor kan hun være?"	Where can she be?	Kjersti Steinsbø	Christoffer V. Ebbesen; Sigrid Clementine Kolbjørnsen	March 31, 2023	11min
27	12	"Alle er fake!"	Everyone is fake!	Kjersti Steinsbø	Christoffer V. Ebbesen; Sigrid Clementine Kolbjørnsen	April 10, 2023	9min
28	13	"Kan jeg få deg?"	Can I have you?	Nina Knag	Christoffer V. Ebbesen; Sigrid Clementine Kolbjørnsen	April 14, 2023	9min
29	14	"Vi er ferdige!"	We're done!	Nina Knag	Christoffer V. Ebbesen; Sigrid Clementine Kolbjørnsen	April 17, 2023	10min
30	15	"Alt eller ingenting"	All or nothing	Kjersti Steinsbø	Christoffer V. Ebbesen; Sigrid Clementine Kolbjørnsen	April 21, 2023	12min

=== Season 3 (2024) ===
No. overall	No. in season	Original Title	Title	Directed by	Written by	Original release date	Runtime
31	1	"Gutta venter"	The boys are waiting	Andreas Søfteland Milde	Christoffer V. Ebbesen; Sigrid Clementine Kolbjørnsen	August 19, 2024	9min
32	2	"Ingen bakker en homse!"	No one backs a gay	Andreas Søfteland Milde	Christoffer V. Ebbesen; Sigrid Clementine Kolbjørnsen	August 19, 2024	10min
33	3	"Hei nye nabo!"	Hello new neighbor!	Andreas Søfteland Milde	Christoffer V. Ebbesen; Sigrid Clementine Kolbjørnsen	August 23, 2024	11min
34	4	"Like fake som før"	Just as fake as before	Andreas Søfteland Milde	Christoffer V. Ebbesen; Sigrid Clementine Kolbjørnsen	August 26, 2024	9min
35	5	"Kan du stikke?"	Can you leave?	Andreas Søfteland Milde	Christoffer V. Ebbesen; Sigrid Clementine Kolbjørnsen	August 30, 2024	9min
36	6	"Gidder ikke noe piss"	Don't give a damn	Andreas Søfteland Milde	Christoffer V. Ebbesen; Sigrid Clementine Kolbjørnsen	September 2, 2024	10min
37	7	"Hvorfor i helvete spør du?"	Why the hell you ask?	Andreas Søfteland Milde	Christoffer V. Ebbesen; Sigrid Clementine Kolbjørnsen	September 6, 2024	10min
38	8	"Ett elendig ligg"	A miserable lay	Andreas Søfteland Milde	Christoffer V. Ebbesen; Sigrid Clementine Kolbjørnsen	September 9, 2024	9min
39	9	"Ikke din hore!"	Not your whore!	Andreas Søfteland Milde	Christoffer V. Ebbesen; Sigrid Clementine Kolbjørnsen	September 13, 2024	10min
40	10	"Dra til helvete, Olivia!"	Go to hell, Olivia!	Andreas Søfteland Milde	Christoffer V. Ebbesen; Sigrid Clementine Kolbjørnsen	September 16, 2024	10min
41	11	"Du hadde en jævla jobb"	You had one fucking job	Christer Steffensen	Christoffer V. Ebbesen; Sigrid Clementine Kolbjørnsen	September 20, 2024	10min
42	12	"Skulle vi ligge?"	Should we sleep together?	Christer Steffensen	Christoffer V. Ebbesen; Sigrid Clementine Kolbjørnsen	September 23, 2024	10min
43	13	"Oslohoren har klamma!"	The Oslo whore has Chlamydia!	Christer Steffensen	Christoffer V. Ebbesen; Sigrid Clementine Kolbjørnsen	September 27, 2024	9min
44	14	"Hva sa du nå?"	What did you just say?	Christer Steffensen	Christoffer V. Ebbesen; Sigrid Clementine Kolbjørnsen	September 30, 2024	10min
45	15	"Nå står vi sammen!"	Now we stand together!	Christer Steffensen	Christoffer V. Ebbesen; Sigrid Clementine Kolbjørnsen	October 4, 2024	10min

=== Season 4 (2025) ===
No. overall	No. in season	Original Title	Title	Directed by	Written by	Original release date	Runtime
46	1	"Er dette takken?"	Is this the thank you?	Unknown		April 28, 2025	10min
47	2	"Dere er syke i hodet!"	You are sick in the head!	Unknown	Unknown	April 28, 2025	8min
48	3	"Unnskyld"	Sorry	Unknown	Unknown	May 1, 2025	11min
49	4	"Fy faen, Sara!"	Damn it, Sara!	Unknown	Unknown	May 5, 2025	11min
50	5	"Løgnaktige bitch"	Lying bitch	Unknown	Unknown	May 8, 2025 (Note: This episode was first released in Germany on May 7, 2025 in the ARD Mediathek.)	8min
51	6	"Tenkte du vi skulle ligge?"	Did you think we were going to sleep together?	Unknown	Unknown	May 12, 2025	10min
52	7	"En sånn guttetur"	Such a boy's trip	Unknown	Unknown	May 15, 2025	TBA
53	8	"Et dårlig menneske"	A bad person	Unknown	Unknown	May 19, 2025	TBA
54	9	"Sett deg i speilet?"	Seen yourself in the mirror?	Unknown	Unknown	May 22, 2025	TBA
55	10	"Skal vi..."	Should we...	Unknown	Unknown	May 26, 2025	TBA
56	11	"Hva faen gjør hun her?"	What the hell is she doing here?	Unknown	Unknown	May 29, 2025	TBA
57	12	"Du har meg. Alltid."	You got me. Always.	Unknown	Unknown	June 2, 2025	TBA
58	13	"Slutt med de løgnene!"	Stop with the lies!	Unknown	Unknown	June 5, 2025	TBA
59	14	"Mener du det?"	Are you serious?	Unknown	Unknown	June 9, 2025	TBA
60	15	"Jævla masse spørsmål"	Many fucking questions	Unknown	Unknown	June 12, 2025	TBA

== Production ==
Rykter is produced by the Norwegian public broadcaster NRK3 in cooperation with Mothership Entertainment AS. After the first seasons success the German public broadcaster NDR joined as co-producer with the goal to distribute the show internationally. The show has been granted a subsidy of 2,750,000 NOK from the Nordisk Film & TV Fond and has a total budget of 18,061,936 NOK.

=== Location ===
The series takes place on a fictional island named Vesterøy. The show was filmed in the sea gap in Øygarden Municipality in Western Norway west of Bergen, where some scenes were also shot.

== Release ==
The series premiered on September 22, 2022, on NRK TV, the streaming service of NRK, as well as on NRK Super in live television. After the success of the first season the second season premiered on the 24th of February 2023 again on NRK TV and NRK Super. It was premiered in Italian on RaiPlay on July 14, 2023.

== Reception ==
=== Norway ===
The main audience for Rykter is Norway, where it landed a success. After the release of the first season it achieved high viewership ratings on NRK which lead to the production of a third season. It was well received in Norway and gained some reputation.

=== International ===
The series has received international attention even though it is specifically targeted at a Norwegian audience. This has led to its distribution on RaiPlay, the streaming service of the Italian public broadcaster RAI. It is the first Norwegian program to achieve the top spot ranking on RaiPlay for multiple weeks.
