= Itazura na Kiss =

Japanese manga series

- Cover of the first tankōbon volume, featuring Kotoko Aihara (left) and Naoki Irie (right)

イタズラなKiss(キッス) (Itazura na Kissu)
- Genre: Romance
- Manga
- Written by: Kaoru Tada
- Published by: Shueisha
- English publisher: NA: Digital Manga Publishing
- Magazine: Bessatsu Margaret
- Original run: June 1990 – March 1999
- Volumes: 23
- Television drama
- Directed by: Mitsunori Morita; Minoki Nemoto; Hiroshi Ikezoe
- Produced by: Mitsunori Morita; Ryoichi Sato; Seiko Uchiyama
- Written by: Kusumoto Hiromi; Harumi Mori
- Music by: Yukiyo Nakamura
- Studio: TV Asahi; Kinoshita Production
- Original network: ANN (TV Asahi)
- Original run: October 14, 1996 – December 16, 1996
- Episodes: 9
- Anime television series
- Directed by: Osamu Yamazaki
- Written by: Yukako Shimizu
- Music by: Yasuharu Takanashi
- Studio: TMS Entertainment
- Licensed by: NA: Discotek Media
- Original network: CBC, TBS
- Original run: April 4, 2008 – September 25, 2008
- Episodes: 25
- Television dramas
- Itazura na Kiss (1996, Japan); It Started with a Kiss (2005, Taiwan); They Kiss Again (2007, Taiwan); Playful Kiss (2010, South Korea); Playful Kiss: Special Edition (2010, South Korea); Mischievous Kiss: Love in Tokyo (2013, Japan); Mischievous Kiss: Love in Tokyo 2 (2014, Japan); Kiss Me (2015, Thailand); Miss in Kiss (2016, Taiwan)
- Live-action films
- Mischievous Kiss the Movie: High School (2016, Japan); Mischievous Kiss the Movie 2: Campus (2017, Japan); Mischievous Kiss the Movie 3: Propose (2017, Japan); Fall in Love at First Kiss (2019, China)
- icon

Itazura na Kiss (Japanese: イタズラなKiss(キッス), Hepburn: Itazura na Kissu; lit. 'Playful Kiss') is a Japanese manga series written and illustrated by Kaoru Tada. Itazura na Kiss was first serialized and published in 1990 by Shueisha through Bessatsu Margaret magazine. It became successful very quickly and became the manga series that Tada became known for in Japan. The manga became so popular that three live TV series have been made so far in 1996, 2005, and 2010, with a sequel of the 2005 drama in late 2007. In 2013, a remake of the Japanese live TV series, called Mischievous Kiss: Love in Tokyo, was made. Despite its success, the manga was never completed due to the unexpected death of the author from a cerebral hemorrhage. However, the manga series continues to be published with the permission of the artist's widower. The manga has sold 35 million copies, making it one of the best-selling manga series of all time.

A drama CD series was released in 2005–2006 and a 25-episode anime adaptation aired in 2008. In an interview, the author's widower, Shigeru Nishikawa, revealed that the manga's intended finale was to be conceptualized in the anime for the first time. Scripts regarding the plot of the anime closely followed the author's planned ending.

On January 27, 2009, Digital Manga Publishing issued a press release announcing the acquisition of the license to publish Itazura na Kiss in English. They published the series in 12 omnibus editions; the first two were scheduled for November 2009 and March 2010, respectively. The last two volumes were available in their Akadot Retail store. The manga is also available through Amazon Kindle and BookWalker.

The series was recently adapted into four live-action films.

== Plot ==
In this romantic comedy story, a dim witted high school girl named Kotoko Aihara finally confesses her romantic feelings to a fellow senior named Naoki, whom she has been infatuated with from afar since she saw him on their first day of high school. However, Naoki, a "super-ikemen" (handsome man) who is smart and good at sports, rejects her offhand. Fate intervenes when a mild earthquake ruins Kotoko's family house. While the house is rebuilt, Kotoko and her father stay at the home of her father's childhood best friend, whose son is revealed to be Naoki. Naoki eventually falls for Kotoko despite her clingy ways and childish behavior and starts to have romantic, protective feelings for her.

== Characters ==
=== Main ===
- Kotoko Aihara (相原 琴子, Aihara Kotoko) (Voiced by: Nana Mizuki; Portrayed by: Aiko Sato, Honoka Miki in the 2013 remake, Reina Visa in the 2016 film) is a high school girl who has been in love with the handsome and intelligent Naoki Irie since their first year in high school after hearing his speech at the opening ceremony. She is a bit ditzy and a below-average student, being placed in the lowest-ranking class F in her year. During her third year, at the start of the series, she writes a love letter to Naoki, but is rejected right away. On the same day as her confession, Kotoko's newly constructed house is destroyed in a mild earthquake; and she discovers that she and her father would be living in the house of her father's close friend, but that the father's son is Naoki. She still feels bullied and disparaged by Naoki, but when she sees he is warming up to her, she gets feelings of love for him again. Naoki later realizes that he is in love with Kotoko and confesses to her, and the couple marry in their second year of college (the third year in the manga version). Kotoko is known as Kotoko Irie onwards. After coming back from her honeymoon with Naoki, Kotoko decides to become a nurse, so that she could be a wife fit for Naoki. After several years of marriage, Kotoko has a daughter with Naoki named Kotomi.
- Naoki Irie (入江 直樹, Irie Naoki) (Voiced by: Daisuke Hirakawa in the drama CD, Daisuke Hirakawa in the anime; Portrayed by: Takashi Kashiwabara, Yuki Furukawa in the 2013 remake, Kanta Sato in the 2016 film) is the smartest and most handsome guy in his high school. He is rumored to have an IQ of 200, and is praised by his peers as being perfect all around. He receives a love letter from Kotoko, but rejects her before she finishes confessing, explaining that he despises "dumb girls". When Kotoko and her father move in with Naoki and his family, he gives Kotoko many hardships and maintains a rather cold attitude towards her, although he gradually warms up to her, because he believed that the trouble she caused made his mundane life more interesting. Though Naoki's grades allow for him to attend any university of his choosing, he eventually decides to attend the same college as Kotoko. After his wedding to Kotoko, Naoki becomes a doctor.

=== Family members ===
- Shigeo Aihara (相原 重雄, Aihara Shigeo) (Voiced by: Bin Shimada, Portrayed by: Takashi Naitou, Yoji Tanaka in the 2013 remake) is Kotoko's widowed father. He is the chef and owner of a restaurant. When Shigeo and Kotoko's house collapses from an earthquake, his close friend Shigeki immediately invites them to live at his home. Shigeo later makes Kinosuke his apprentice.
- Shigeki Irie (入江 重樹, Irie Shigeki) (Voiced by: Takashi Nagasako) is the father of Naoki and Yuuki, and the close friend of Shigeo. He is the president of a gaming company, thus enabling his family to have a wealthy lifestyle. Shigeki originally pressured Naoki to become his successor, but relents after seeing Naoki's passion for medicine. Yuuki later offers to become his successor.
- Noriko Irie (入江 紀子, Irie Noriko) (Voiced by: Naoko Matsui) is Naoki and Yuuki's mother, and eventually Kotoko's mother-in-law. She has a sweet, kind personality and deeply loves her children and husband. She tends to be warm and expressive. Loves Kotoko very much, and was the first person to suggest that Naoki and Kotoko date.
- Yuuki Irie (入江 裕樹, Irie Yūki) (Voiced by: Romi Park, Portrayed by: Ryotaro Akashi, Yuga Aizawa in the 2013 remake) is the brother of Naoki. He really looks up to his older brother especially because of his strong composure during situations and the fact that he can do anything. In the beginning he openly hated Kotoko, but as she spent more time with his family he grew used to her but openly insults. At first he never believed his brother would ever fall for Kotoko until he saw his brother kiss Kotoko secretly while she was sleeping and promised not to tell anyone. But when Naoki almost married Sahoko (in the anime adaptation Chris is engaged to Naoki instead), he questioned him about whether he really wants to marry her and let Kotoko go.
- Kotomi Irie (入江 琴美, Irie Kotomi) (Voiced by: Tomoko Kaneda) is Naoki and Kotoko's daughter. She constantly fights for Naoki's affection with Kotoko much to her mother's dismay, in which Naoki favors Kotomi over his wife. Kotomi has a father complex and tells Naoki that she wants to marry him when she grows up. However, Naoki replies that he cannot because he already belongs to her mother.
- Rika Irie (入江 理加, Irie Rika) is Naoki's and Yuuki's cousin. She moved to America five years ago. When she comes back, she tries to break Naoki and Kotoko apart but eventually fails when Kotoko declare she would never gone to America and that Rika would never able love Naoki as much as she does and Naoki choose Kotoko over Rika because of Kotoko's presistance and love for him. She also turns out to be Naoki's first kiss, but it was against his wishes. She appeared in the Korean adaptation's special in YouTube.

=== Classmates ===
- Jinko Komori (小森 じん子, Komori Jinko) (Voiced by: Kinoko Yamada, Portrayed by: Sakura Uehara, Nanami Fujimoto in the 2013 remake, Atsuki Tomori) is one of Kotoko's best friends, who belonged in the F-class with Kotoko. She eventually attends the same university as Kotoko as well. In the manga, she is in a relationship with the singer Junpei Narasaki.
- Satomi Ishikawa (石川 理美, Ishikawa Satomi) (Voiced by: Risa Hayamizu, Portrayed by Tomomi Miyauchi, Kasumi Yamaya in the 2013 remake, Nonoka Yamaguchi) is one of Kotoko's best friends. She gets married after she gets pregnant and has a daughter named Kiseki, who seems to be very attached to Yuuki.
- Kinnosuke Ikezawa (池沢金之助, Ikezawa Kinnosuke) (Voiced by: Shūhei Sakaguchi, Portrayed by: Shinsuke Aoki, Yuki Yamada in the 2013 remake, Shimon Okura) nicknamed Kin, is the guy who has liked Kotoko ever since high school and did not give up until Naoki confessed that he was emotionally involved with her as well. After a year, he meets Christine and marries her, thus ending his devotion to Kotoko. However, he and Kotoko retain their friendship.
- Sudou (須藤, Sudō) (Voiced by: Akio Otsuka) is Kotoko and Naoki's senpai in college and the school's tennis captain. He has liked Reiko since meeting her, but has not been successful in winning her heart. In the anime, however, he is shown to have married her in Episode 24. Kotoko describes him as someone who has a dual personality. He is very kind when he is not holding the tennis racquet, but once he holds it, he becomes vicious and competitive (most especially to Naoki, but he always loses to him).
- Takendo Nakagawa (中川武人, Nakagawa Takehito) is one of Kotoko's few admirers. He met her in college and tried to date her, but eventually fell for Ayako, Reiko's little sister.
- Reiko Matsumoto (松本麗子, Matsumoto Reiko) (Yuuko (裕子, Yūko) in the anime) (Voiced by: Akiko Kimura; Portrayed by: Maju Ozawa and Kanna Mori in the 2013 remake) is one of Naoki's many love trials. She has been interested in him since before college, but decides to give up after Kotoko and Naoki get married. After graduation, she starts to work for a computer company.
- Konomi Sagawa (佐川好美, Sagawa Konomi) shares the same personality as Kotoko; both are as naïve and caring. She has liked Yuuki since junior high, but he refused to be her friend. After a while, Yuuki has a change of heart.
- Keita Kamogari (鴨狩啓太, Kamogari Keita) is one of Kotoko's classmates in nursing school. He is very passionate about nursing and can therefore be very fierce if things do not go right. Naoki was jealous because of Keita and Kotoko's relationship. Keita liked Kotoko once, but after he realized how much Kotoko and Naoki loved each other, he gave up. Finally, he met the handicapped Akiko during training and fell for her.
- Motoki Kikyou (桔梗幹, Kikyō Motoki) is Kotoko's classmate in nursing school. He is born a boy, but prefers to be a girl. Of all the guys that Kotoko knows, he is the most girly one. He is the president of Naoki's fan club.
- Tomoko Ogura (小倉智子, Ogura Tomoko) is Kotoko's classmate in nursing school. She is sweet and kind and gentle like an angel, but is also crazy about seeing blood, which makes her somewhat scary.
- Marina Shinagawa (品川真里奈, Shinagawa Marina) is Kotoko's classmate in nursing school. She went to study nursing to marry a doctor. Eventually, she becomes involved with Funatsu, although she keeps trying to get close to other guys.
- Seiichi Funatsu (船津誠一, Funatsu Seiichi) is Naoki's rival in medical school. He always tried to beat him, but never succeeded once as Naoki was always the smarter one. He claimed that he did not like to date, but eventually fell in love with Kotoko's classmate, Marina.

=== Other characters ===
- Christine Robbins (クリスティーヌ・ロビンス, Kurisutīnu Robinsu) (Voiced by: Yūko Gotō) is a foreign exchange student from the United Kingdom who has gone to Japan to find a Japanese boyfriend. She falls for Kin, and manages to win his heart and marries him. She is then known as Christine Ikezawa and has several children with Kin after their marriage. In the anime adaptation, she is the daughter of the bank involved with Naoki's father's company. Sahoko does not appear and Chris is the one Naoki casually dates.
- Ayako Matsumoto (松本 綾子, Matsumoto Ayako) (Voiced by: Saori Seto) is the little sister of Reiko. She liked Naoki at first, but eventually fell for Kotoko's admirer; Takendo.
- Sahoko Oizumi (大泉 沙穂子, Ōizumi Sahoko) is the granddaughter of an old CEO of a successful company. She was arranged to marry Naoki to help fix his father's company's problems. But when she understood that he was in love with Kotoko, she gave up. In the anime adaptation, she does not appear at all and Chris is the one who dates Naoki.
- Akiko (秋子) (Voiced by: Saori Seto) is a handicapped patient that Keita was assigned to take care of when he went on an internship. During that time, the two of them fell for each other. Because she lost faith in herself, she stopped trying to walk. However, after an unexpected fright from Kotoko, she walks again.
- Toyo Yoshida (吉田 トヨ, Yoshida Toyo) is an 80-year-old lady which is picky and gives nurses problems especially towards Kotoko. She was looked after by Kotoko, and eventually realises that Kotoko is a hard worker and gives her less of a hard time.
- Ryo Takamiya (高宮 良, Takamiya Ryō) is Satomi's rich boyfriend and later husband. Because he is a very obedient boy, he had a hard time defying his mother who was against his marriage with Satomi, but after a little support from Kotoko, decides to follow his heart.
- Nobuhiro Kimura (木村 ノブヒロ, Kimura Nobuhiro) became Yuuki's friend when he went to the hospital. This boy has a kidney problem and was unable to live with his parents. Years later, he reappears as a young and famous actor. His parents have divorced, both remarried. He moved out after his father had a baby with his new wife. He appears to have given up on life, until Kotoko and Naoki give him hope again. Kotoko offers him hope and he turns into a kinder person.

== Adaptations ==
=== TV dramas ===
In 1996, Itazura na Kiss was first adapted into a Japanese television drama of the same title, which ran from October 14 to December 16, 1996, for 9 episodes every Monday at 20:00 until 21:00 JST. This version did not cover Kotoko's and Naoki's married life.

In 2005, it was adapted into two Taiwanese dramas, It Started with a Kiss and its sequel They Kiss Again, both starring Ariel Lin as not-so-bright Yuan Xiang-qin and Joe Cheng as the genius Jiang Zhi-shu.

In 2010, it was adapted into a South Korean drama series, Playful Kiss, starring Kim Hyun-joong of SS501 as the perfectionist Baek Seung-jo and Jung So-min as the clumsy Oh Ha-ni. The series consisted of 16 TV episodes and 7 webisodes.

In 2013, a second Japanese live-action adaptation aired on Fuji TV under the title Mischievous Kiss: Love in Tokyo. It starred Miki Honoka as Kotoko Aihara and Yuki Furukawa as Naoki Irie. At the end of 2014, the sequel Mischievous Kiss 2: Love in Okinawa was aired, with both lead actors reprising their roles. The second season ended in March 2015.

In 2015, it was adapted into a Thai drama series, Kiss Me (รักล้นใจนายแกล้งจุ๊บ). It starred Pirath Nitipaisankul and Sushar Manaying, and it aired on True4U.

In 2016, it was adapted into a second Taiwanese drama, Miss in Kiss, starring Esther Wu as Xiang Yue-qin and Dino Lee as Jiang Zhi-shu. 39 episodes (20–30 minutes each) were broadcast from December 8, 2016, to March 24, 2017. The Japanese-dubbed version of the drama was released in mid-2017.

=== Anime ===
Itazura na Kiss was adapted into a 25 episode Japanese animated TV series by TMS Entertainment and shown on TBS from April 4, 2008, to September 25, 2008. The opening theme was "Kimi, Meguru, Boku" by Motohiro Hata, and the primary ending themes were "Kataomoi Fighter" by GO!GO!7188 and "Jikan yo Tomare (Stop Time)" by Azu featuring Seamo. Discotek Media licensed the animated series for Northern America and released it out on DVD in late 2014.

=== Films ===
- Mischievous Kiss the Movie: High School (2016)
- Mischievous Kiss the Movie 2: Campus (2017)
- Mischievous Kiss the Movie 3: Propose (2017)
- Fall in Love at First Kiss (2019), a Taiwanese film adaptation starring Lin Yun as Yuan Xiangqin and Darren Wang as Jiang Zhishu. The OST features Liu Renyu's "Proof of Heartbeat".
