= Kaoru Tada =

Japanese manga artist (1960–1999)

Kaoru Tada 多田かおる
- Born: September 25, 1960 Neyagawa, Osaka, Japan
- Died: March 11, 1999 (aged 38)
- Areas: Writer, Penciller, Inker
- Notable works: Itazura na Kiss, Love Me, My Knight
- Spouse: Shigeru Nishikawa (m. 1985)

Kaoru Tada (Japanese: 多田かおる, Hepburn: Tada Kaoru; September 25, 1960 – March 11, 1999) was a Japanese manga artist.

== Biography ==
Tada made her debut in 1977, when still a high school student, on Shueisha's Deluxe Margaret magazine. Tada's stories belong to the shōjo demographic of manga and feature love stories centered on young female characters and their love interests. The storylines include comedic moments and are characterised by essential and sharp drawings. Some of Tada's most popular works are Love Me, My Knight, Itazura na Kiss, and Kimi no na wa Debora.

On May 10, 1985, she married Shigeru Nishikawa (西川茂, Nishikawa Shigeru), then the producer of the band PRESENCE. Despite an ovarian cyst making a potential pregnancy impossible, she gave birth to their first son on February 7, 1989.

Love Me, My Knight portrays the Japanese rock music scene of the early 1980s. The anime series based on Love Me, My Knight was the first ever to feature original songs performed within the episodes. Another of Tada's works, Miihaa Paradise, is also set in the rock 'n' roll world.

Itazura na Kiss (Mischievous Kiss), which begun in 1991 and never completed, was by far Tada's most successful work in Japan. It tells the love story between Kotoko and Naoki from high school until after their marriage. The series inspired also an illustrated art book and two novels written by Nori Harata and published in Shueisha's Cobalt imprint. In 1996, a live action Japanese TV series based on Itazura na Kiss was also produced, starring Aiko Sato as Kotoko and Takashi Kashiwabara as Naoki. In 2005, the series was adapted into a Taiwanese drama under the name of It Started with a Kiss with lead actors Joe Cheng and Ariel Lin, and in 2008, an anime was also released. This series was also adapted into a Korean drama called Playful Kiss with lead actors Kim Hyun-joong and Jung So-min. In 2013, a Japanese adaptation, titled Mischievous Kiss: Love in Tokyo, starring Yuki Furukawa as Naoki Irie and Honoka Miki as Kotoko Aihara, was released.

In 2015, a Thailand adaptation entitled Kiss Me starring Mike D. Angelo as Tenten and Sushar Manaying as Taliw was aired and has steadily earned the attention of fans from around the world.

Tada died in March 1999 of a cerebral hemorrhage. While moving to a new residence, she hit her head on a marble table and fell into a coma. Three weeks later she died at age 38.

== Works ==
- Love Me, My Knight (愛してナイト, Ai Shite Knight), serialized in Bessatsu Margaret, 1981–83, 7 volumes
- Itazura na Kiss (イタズラなKiss, Mischievous Kiss), Bessatsu Margaret, 1991–99, 23 volumes
- Itazura na Kiss Irasuto Shū (多田かおるイラスト集 イタズラなKiss), artbook published by Shueisha, 1 volume
- Kawaii Ojisama (A Fine Dad), Margaret, 1 volume
- Kimagure Enjeru (きまぐれエンジェル, Capricious Angel), Bessatsu Margaret, 1 volume
- Kimi no Na wa Debora (君の名はデボラ, Your Name Is Deborah), Bessatsu Margaret, 1988, 2 volumes
- Debora ga Raibaru (デボラがライバル, Deborah's the Rival), Bessatsu Margaret, 1996–1998, 4 volumes
- Sabishigariya no Deborah (さびしがりやのデボラ), Bessatsu Margaret, 1 volume
- Horeru Yo! Koi, Margaret, 1 volume
- Ai Shi Koi Shi no Manon!, Margaret, 1 volume
- Kinta-kun ni Goyōjin!, Bessatsu Margaret, 1 volume
- Tiinzu Burabo (Teens Bravo), Margaret, 1 volume
- Miihaa Paradise (Fans' Paradise), Margaret, 2 volumes
- High School Magic, Margaret, 2 volumes
