= They Kiss Again =

2007 Taiwanese television series

- Promotional poster
- Also known as: 惡作劇2吻
- Genre: Romance, Comedy
- Based on: Itazura na Kiss by Kaoru Tada
- Directed by: Chu Yu-ning (瞿友寧)
- Starring: Ariel Lin; Joe Cheng; Jiro Wang; Danson Tang
- Opening theme: "幸福合作社" (Xing Fu He Zhuo She) by Mavis Fan
- Ending theme: "你" (Ni) [You] by Ariel Lin
- Country of origin: Taiwan
- Original language: Mandarin
- No. of episodes: 20

Production
- Executive producer: Jerry Feng
- Production locations: Taipei, Taiwan
- Running time: 70 minutes (Sundays at 22:00 to 23:30)
- Production company: Comic International Productions

Original release
- Network: China Television (CTV)
- Release: 16 December 2007 – 27 April 2008

Related
- Romantic Princess; Rolling Love; It Started with a Kiss (prequel); Playful Kiss (Korean)

They Kiss Again (Chinese: 惡作劇2吻; pinyin: È Zuò Jù Èr Wěn) is a 2007 Taiwanese television series starring Joe Cheng, Ariel Lin, Jiro Wang and Danson Tang. It is the sequel to It Started with a Kiss which is based on the Japanese manga series Itazura na Kiss (イタズラなKiss, Mischievous Kiss) written by Kaoru Tada. It was produced by Comic International Productions (可米國際影視事業股份有限公司) and directed by Chu Yu-ning (瞿友寧). It started filming 26 March 2007 and wrapped 19 January 2008.

It was first broadcast in Taiwan on free-to-air China Television (CTV) from 16 December 2007 to 27 April 2008, every Sunday at 22:00 to 23:30 and cable TV Gala Television (GTV) Variety Show/CH 28 on 22 December 2007 to 3 May 2008, every Saturday at 21:30 to 23:00.

It is the third live-action television adaptation following the Japanese adaptation also titled Itazura na Kiss, its prequel It Started with a Kiss in 2005 and followed by a South Korean adaptation Playful Kiss in 2010 broadcast on MBC.

== Synopsis ==
It Started with a Kiss ended with odd couple Zhi Shu (Joe Cheng) and Xiang Qin (Ariel Lin) getting married in characteristically comical fashion, and the sequel picks up the story with their honeymoon and married life. Xiang Qin is as ham-fisted as ever, creating many funny situations as she learns the ropes of being a wife and tries hard to become a good nurse and work alongside her genius husband. Aspiring doctor Zhi Shu meets some obstacles at school when he encounters both academic and romantic rivals who are determined to over-rule him.

As Zhi Shu and Xiang Qin struggle with their professional ambitions, they also struggle with their personal relationship. Many times, Zhi Shu's coldness and harshness drives Xiang Qin to tears and she tries to run away. Zhi Shu learns to understand and deal with his jealousy when Xiang Qin's nursing fellow student Yang Qi Tai (Figaro Ceng) becomes too close. He also tries to push Xiang Qin to higher ambition and independence. Zhi Shu soon learns to love Xiang Qin and forgive her bumbling ways, and Xiang Qin tries harder to become a better wife and nurse to her husband.

Zhi Shu and Xiang Qin are not the only ones having problems with their relationship. Xiang Qin's childhood friend Ah Jin (Jiro Wang) deals with the unwelcome affections of Christine (Larisa Bakurova), an English exchange student who latches onto him against his will. Xiang Qin's friend, Chun Mei (Petty Yang), gets pregnant by her boyfriend, Ah Bu (Aaron Yan), but his wealthy, highbrow mother is desperate to keep them apart. Zhi Shu's younger brother Yu Shu (Zhang Bo Han) deals with his own first love and their story remarkably resembles that of Zhi Shu and Xiang Qin.

== Cast ==
=== Main cast ===
- Ariel Lin as Yuan Xiang Qin (袁湘琴) - Kotoko Aihara in the manga and Jiang Zhi Shu's wife
- Joe Cheng as Jiang Zhi Shu (江直樹) - Naoki Irie in the manga and Yuan Xiang Qin's husband
- Jiro Wang as Jin Yuan Feng (a.k.a. Ah Jin) (金元豐) - Kinnosuke Ikezawa in the manga and Yuan Xiang Qin's friend

=== Supporting cast ===
- Chang Yung Cheng as Jiang Wan Li (a.k.a. Ah Li) (江萬利) - Zhi Shu's father
- Cyndi Chaw as Jiang Zhao Zi (a.k.a. Ah Li's wife) (阿利嫂) - Zhi Shu's mother
- Tang Tsung Sheng as Yuan Cai (Ah Cai) (袁有才) - Xiang Qin's father
- Zhang Bo Han as Jiang Yu Shu (江裕樹) - Zhi Shu's brother
- Petty Yang as Lin Chun Mei (林純美) - Xiang Qin's best friend
- Candice Liu as Liu Ya Nong (劉雅儂) - Xiang Qin's best friend
- Ann Hsu as Pei Zi Yu (裴子瑜) - Zhi Shu's friend
- Jason Wang as Wang Hao Qian (王皓謙) - Zhi Shu's college friend
- Aaron Yan as Ah Bu (阿布) - Chun Mei's bf

=== Extended cast ===
- Danson Tang (唐禹哲) as Ouyang Gan (歐陽幹)
- Billie Wang as Ah Bu (阿布)'s mother
- Guan Cong (關聰) as Zhi Shu (直樹)'s grandfather
- Senda Aisa (千田愛紗) as Mary (瑪麗)
- Kitamura Toyoharu as Qing Yu (青宇)
- Gu Xuan Chun as Ah Qiao (阿巧)
- Jason as Wang Hao Qian (王皓謙)
- Ma Nian Xian (馬念先) as Du Ze Sen (杜澤森)
- Wang Zi (邱勝翊 / 王子) as Ah Nuo (阿諾) / Nobu
- Guan Jia Yun (關嘉芸) as Zhang Jun Ya (張君雅)
- Joelle Lu (陸明君) as Jun Ya (君雅)'s mother
- Zhu De Gang (朱德剛) as Zhang Xi Hen (張熙恆)
- Lin Yu Feng (林裕豐) as Xiang Qin's uncle
- Hu Pei Ying (胡珮瑩) as Zhao Qing Shui (趙清水)
- Figaro Ceng (曾少宗) as Yang Qi Tai (楊啟太)
- Cai Yi Zhen as Luo Zhi Yi (羅智儀)
- Jiang Pei Zhen (江佩珍) as Zhang Ni Na (章妮娜)
- Xiu Jie Kai (修杰楷) as Zhou Chuan Jin (周傳津)
- Li Er (黎兒/粼筱蓉) as Xu Qiu Xian (許秋賢)
- Lin Jia Yu (林珈妤) as childhood Lin Hao Mei (林好美)
- Summer Meng (孟耿如) as teenage Lin Hao Mei (林好美)
- Cong Yang (崇洋) as teenage Jiang Yu Shu (江裕樹)
- Larisa Bakurova (瑞莎) as Christine Robinson (克莉斯汀)
- Joe Cheng (鄭元暢) as Alvin—Christine's Fiancé
- Liu Rong Jia (劉容嘉) as Liu Nong (流濃)
- Ken Zhong as Li Shu Ning (李述宁)

== Soundtrack ==
They Kiss Again

Soundtrack album
- Released: 28 December 2007
- Genre: Mandopop
- Language: Mandarin
- Label: Avex Taiwan

They Kiss Again Original Soundtrack (惡作劇2吻電視原聲) was released on 28 December 2007, by various artists under Avex Taiwan. It contains eleven songs, in which three of them are instrumental versions of some songs. The opening theme song is "Xing Fu He Zhuo She" or "Happiness Cooperative" by Mavis Fan, while the ending theme song is by Ariel Lin entitled "Ni" or "You".

=== Track listing ===
No.	Title	Lyrics	Music	Singer	Length
1.	"Happiness Cooperative" (幸福合作社)	瞿友寧	片頭曲	Mavis Fan
2.	"You" (你)	藍又時	片尾曲	Ariel Lin
3.	"Loyal Flavor" (忠於原味)	嚴云農	插 曲	Joe Cheng
4.	"Be Your Superman"	王威登	插 曲	Chun Biao Yan
5.	"The Secrets Hidden In The Smile" (藏在微笑裡的秘密)	徐世珍	插 曲	Cyndi Chaw
6.	"Have you Ever Let My Heart" (你曾經讓我心動)	Hsie He-hsian	Hsie He-hsian	Hsie He-hsian

== Awards and nominations ==
Year	Award	Category	Result
2008	43rd Golden Bell Awards	Best Actress - Ariel Lin	Won

== See also ==
- Itazura na Kiss: The original manga version of the novel
- It Started with a Kiss: prequel of the Taiwanese television drama adaptation
- Playful Kiss: Korean TV drama adaptation
- Mischievous Kiss: Love in Tokyo: Japanese series adaptation of the manga 2013 remake
- Race the World: 2016 Chinese reality show, Lin and Cheng paired up and won the competition
