= Colours of Wind =

Colours of the Wind
- Theatrical release poster
- 風の色 (Kaze no Iro)
- Directed by: Kwak Jae-yong
- Screenplay by: Kwak Jae-yong
- Produced by: Atsushi Ichikawa; Hwang Yong-soon
- Starring: Yuki Furukawa; Takemi Fujii; Tomoya Ishii; Yoshihiko Hakamada; Yoshiko Nakada
- Cinematography: Lee Seong-je; Park Cheon-bok
- Edited by: Hong Jae-hee
- Production company: ASIA Pictures Entertainment
- Release dates: 14 July 2017 (Bucheon International Fantastic Film Festival); 5 April 2018 (South Korea)
- Running time: 119 minutes
- Country: Japan
- Language: Japanese

Colours of the Wind (Japanese: 風の色, Hepburn: Kaze no Iro) is a 2017 Japanese adventure/romance film, directed by Kwak Jae-yong. The film was featured on Chicago's biannual Asian Pop-Up Cinema program.

== Plot ==
After his partner Yuri leaves him, Ryo spends a lot of time depressed, not knowing where he has gone. One day he decides to go to a bar. There he is offered a briefcase and told that he had given it to the barkeep himself 100 days ago, saying that he would return in 100 days but not remember the briefcase and that the barkeep was to return it to him anyway. In it are mementos and photos of their time together, along with the diary Yuri kept then. Ryo next gets a call from Yuri's mother who tells him that Yuri has committed suicide.

Ryo returns to the bar. It specializes in magic and also runs magic classes. Ryo ends up taking classes and finds himself quite good at it. Then while there the bar owner tells him that he, the bartender, has a doppelgänger who teaches the classes. Ryo learns that he has his own doppelgänger named Ryu, who is coincidentally a skilled magician, in Hokkaido. He learns this when he learns that Ryu was killed in a magic stunt that went wrong, but had never been found. Yuri had talked about Hokkaido to Ryo before her death and when he learns of the doppelgänger, he decides to go there.

In Hokkaido, Ryu finds Yuri's doppelgänger who goes by the name of Aya. She thinks he is Ryu who has somehow escaped the stunt. Ryo pretends to be Ryu in order to keep the girl who is so much like Yuri by his side.

When Ryo sleeps with her, he notices that she has the same tattoo as Yuri did. He leaves the next morning without saying goodbye to Yuri, but he leaves the contents of the briefcase behind to remind Aya/Yuri of what they had together in Tokyo. He finds Yuri's mother and tells her that Yuri is alive in Hokkaido. The woman confesses that she is in fact Yuri's aunt and not her mother...and that Yuri never died. Yuri is from Hokkaido. She was so troubled by Ryo's death that her aunt brought her to Tokyo where she created a new identity for herself, calling herself Yuri. She fell for Ryo's doppelgänger, but slowly began to feel guilty, thinking that perhaps Ryo had survived. She assumed her Aya identity and returned to Hokkaido. Ryo spends the next year practicing and honing his magic skills

Ryo is then informed that Yuri is in fact suffering from dissociative identity disorder and has been institutionalized. Her emotional health was too fragile to stand the shock of finding out that who she wanted to believe was Ryu was actually Ryo. Ryo breaks her out by performing a magic trick at her hospital and they spend a long time together and have an in-depth exchange about identity. Aya can't claim her identity because doing so would mean admitting that Ryo is dead, so she wavers between Aya and Yuri, but Yuri needs to stop existing because she's just a fiction. Eventually Aya/Yuri allows herself to be taken back to the hospital. In order to make up for hurting Yuri/Aya, Ryo decides to immerse himself into Ryu. He prepares to recreate Ryu's final trick in which he disappeared. His body is put into a cage and dropped into the ocean. He manages to escape, but in the meantime, finds Ryu's body in the water. He later finds an audio tape made by Ryu explaining that, by slipping into another dimension, Ryu became aware of Ryo, and knew that 2 doppelgängers can't survive together. He could see Ryu's future with Yuri/Aya, but not his. He was willing to sacrifice himself if Ryo would come and love what he had loved, including Aya/Yuri.

== Cast ==
- Yuki Furukawa as Ryo/Ryu
- Takemi Fujii as Aya/Yuri
- Tomoya Ishii as Ryoma Kawaguchi
- Yoshihiko Hakamada as Kiyofumi Watanabe
- Yoshiko Nakada as Kanae Kawaguchi
