= Tsai Yi-chen =

Taiwanese actress

- Born: 蔡宜臻; 23 August 1987 (age 39); Taiwan
- Occupations: Actress, singer, presenter
- Years active: 2005–present
- Musical career
- Also known as: 五熊(Wu Xiong), Bernice
- Origin: Republic of China (Taiwan)
- Genres: Mandopop
- Labels: Comic Productions Co., Ltd (2005–present)

Tsai Yi-chen (Chinese: 蔡頤臻; pinyin: Cài Yízhēn), born 23 August 1987, stage named Wu Xiong (五熊). She is a Taiwanese actress who is best known for her minor performance in Taiwanese series, KO One, as Tsai Wu Xiong, and for her lead performance in Summer x Summer as Xia Ya.

Her older sister, Tsai Han-tsen is also an actress.

Tsai was arrested in Kansai International Airport in August 2026 after pouring oil on a National Treasure-designated Buddha footprint at the historic temple Yakushi-ji during a visit in April, claiming to be moved by the monument. She subsequently apologized.

== Filmography ==
=== Television series ===
| Year | Chinese Title | English | Role |
|---|---|---|---|
| 2005 | 安室愛美惠 | I Love My Wife | Xie Yu Geng (謝瑜菮) |
| 2005 | 終極一班 | KO One | Cai Wu Xiong (蔡五熊) |
| 2006 | 東方茱麗葉 | Tokyo Juliet | Pei Mei Zi (裴美子) |
| 2007 | 熱情仲夏 | Summer x Summer | Xia Ya (夏芽) |
| 2007 | 惡作劇二吻 | They Kiss Again | Luo Zhi Yi (羅智儀) |
| 2008 | 霹靂MIT | Mysterious Incredible Terminator | Xu Wan Xin (許萬欣) |
| 2009 | 終極三國 | K.O.3an Guo | Xiao Qiao (小喬) |
| 2010 | 萌學園之萌騎士傳奇 | The M Riders | (乌拉拉) |
| 2010 | 死神少女 | Gloomy Salad Days | Xiao Ya Zhen (蕭亞貞) |
| 2010 | 愛似百匯 | Love Buffet | Wanzi (丸子) |
| 2012 | 終極一班2 | KO One 2 | Cai Wu Xiong (蔡五熊) |
| 2015 | 終極一班5 | KO One 5 | Cai Wu Xiong (蔡五熊) |

=== Films ===
- LOVE (2012)
- Flavor Lover (2013)
- Our Times (2015)

=== Music videos ===
- Say what you want – Xiao Yu
- Tired – Shin (band)
- 24 hours crazy – Nylon Chen

== Discography ==
- Tokyo Juliet (2006)
- Heaven duet with sister Tsai Han-tsen, They Kiss Again (2007)
- Qin Xia Tian Yi Xia duet with Joe Cheng, Summer x Summer (2007)
