= Noémie Nakai =

French-Japanese actress

- 中井 ノエミ
- Born: Noémie Nakai; December 2, 1990 (age 35); Tokyo, Japan
- Education: Lycée International de Saint-Germain-en-Laye, Keio University, University of Nottingham
- Occupations: Actress; director
- Years active: 2013–present
- Website: noemienakai.com

Noémie Nakai (中井 ノエミ, Nakai Noemi; born December 2, 1990) is a French-Japanese actress, director and former model.

== Early life ==
Noémie Nakai was born on December 2, 1990, in Tokyo, Japan. She has a French mother and a Japanese father. She took acting lessons when she was very young in France, and arrived by chance in modeling by shooting for advertisements in order to follow her friends. In 2013, she got her first real acting role in the drama Shûden Bye Bye. Nakai is a graduate of the Lycée International de Saint-Germain-en-Laye in France and Keio University in Japan. She also studied at the University of Nottingham in England.

== Career ==
In 2015, she built her reputation for her role as Christine Robbins in the second season of Mischievous Kiss: Love in Tokyo.

On the eve of her thirties, she won the Busan Award in October 2019 as a director in the Asian Project Market section (co-production platform allowing emerging directors to meet market professionals on an international level) of the Busan International Film Festival for the Topography of Solitude project.

Her short film Tears Teacher spotted at the Hot Docs Festival was acquired by the Op Docs section of The New York Times. This ten-minute documentary is dedicated to Hidefumi Yoshida, a teacher who has been a tear therapy practitioner since 2015, who organizes meetings where men and women cry bitterly and anonymously write down painful episodes of their lives. “Emotional outbursts” are frowned upon in Japan. Tears Teacher was selected in the short documentary category of the 2021 Sundance Festival available for streaming on the New York Times website.

In 2022, Noémie Nakai played Luna in Tokyo Vice, a television series for HBO Max, the first episode of which is directed by Michael Mann.

=== Art studies ===
- Cours Simon in Paris (2004-2008)
- School of Le Vésinet in France (2001-2004)
- Music production on the Isle of Wight in England (2002-2003)
- Singing class / voice exercises in Tokyo
- Dance class (ballet, modern dance)

== Personal life ==
In 2018, Nakai moved to London to pursue director opportunities and splits her time between England and Japan.

== Filmography ==
Noémie Nakai starred in a dozen films and TV series.

=== Film ===
Year	Title	Role	Notes
2015	Equals	Uncredited	
2015	Sayonara	French android	
2016	Tanaka's stomach	Kumi Adegawa	Short film
2016	The Reading Forest	The Organist	Short film
2016	High&Low The Red Rain	Furuno	
2016	Death Note: Light Up the New World	J	
2017	Radiance	a model	
2017	Red Sash: The Tomioka Silk Mill Story	Emilie Brunat	
2017	High&Low The Movie 2 / End of Sky	Furuno	
2017	The Last Dream		Short film
2021	Army of Thieves	Beatrix	
2022	Sitting Pretty	Chloe	Short film

=== Television ===
Year	Title	Role	Notes
2013	Shûden Bye Bye	Sophie (French tourist)	1 episode
2014–2015	Mischievous Kiss: Love in Tokyo	Christine Robbins	8 episodes
2015	The Emperor's Cook	Simone	2 episodes
2016	Kasôken no onna: New Year Special	Elisa Dubois	TV movie
2016	Never Let Me Go	Manami	6 episodes
2016	Death Note: New Generation	J	1 episode
2022	Tokyo Vice	Luna	7 episodes

=== Video games ===
Year	Title	Role	Notes
2019	Grid	Additional voice-over cast	Voice role
2022	Grid Legends	Drift Announcer	Voice role
2026	007 First Light	Isola Vale	Voice role and motion capture

=== Music videos ===
- Koda Kumi - "Slow" feat. Omarion (2020)
- V6
- (2012) Music video for Rabbit "Nikki"
- Rottengraffty

== Appearance ==
=== Advertisements ===
- Astalift
- McDonald's
- Peach John
- Shiseido
- (2012) TV Commercial for Matsumoto Kiyoshi Argelan organic shampoo (Tokyo, Japan)
- (2014) TV Commercial for GU
- (2014) TV commercial for Morinaga Mashbon
- (2014) Advertisement for United Arrows
- (2014) Advertisement for Grand Hyatt Fukuoka
- (2014) TV Commercial for Laforet - Summer sale

=== Magazines ===
- Akasugu
- Snowgirl
- Volt
- Zexy

=== Model ===
- (2011) Sony Tablet S - Model
- (2012) Commercial for Ridez 2012 S/S - Model
- (2013) Commercial for Emobile - Model (Tokyo, Japan)
- (2013) Prints ads for Victorian House Reintei Weddings (Kobe, Japan)
- (2013) Print ads for Vernal make-up brand.

=== Radio ===
- (2013) "Hello world" radio emission on J-Wave- Guest (Tokyo, Japan)
