= Summer & Summer =

- Promotional poster
- Also known as: 熱情仲夏 rè qíng zhòng xià
- Genre: Romance, comedy
- Based on: Pii Natsu ga Ippai by Yachi Emiko
- Directed by: Mingtai Wang
- Starring: Joe Cheng; Wu Xiong; Ethan Juan
- Opening theme: "你要什麼就說" (Just Say What You Want) by Xiao Yu
- Ending theme: "累了" (Tired) by Shin
- Country of origin: Taiwan
- Original language: Mandarin
- No. of episodes: 12

Production
- Running time: 90 mins (Sundays at 21:30)
- Production company: Comic Productions Co.

Original release
- Network: Chinese Television System (CTS)
- Release: 11 March – 27 May 2007

Related
- Hanazakarino Kimitachihe; Why Why Love

Summer & Summer (traditional Chinese: 熱情仲夏; simplified Chinese: 热情仲夏; pinyin: rè qíng zhòng xià; lit. 'Passionate summer') is a 2007 Taiwanese television series starring Joe Cheng, Wu Xiong and Ethan Juan. It was based on the Japanese josei manga, ぴー夏がいっぱい (Rom. Pii Natsu ga Ippai or lit. Nice Summer), written by Yachi Emiko. It was produced by Comic Productions and directed by Wang Mingtai.

The series was first broadcast in Taiwan on the free-to-air Chinese Television System (CTS) from 11 March to 27 May 2007, every Sunday at 21:30 and on cable TV Gala Television (GTV Variety Show) from 17 March to 6 June 2007, every Saturday at 21:00. The first episode on CTS achieved an average rating of 1.30 and peaked at 2.68.

== Synopsis ==
Xia Ya chooses a hair salon that is a dollar cheaper than the others, leading to many unfortunate events. When her handbag is stolen along with all her money, she does not even have one dollar to call her parents for help. However, when she feels like all hope is lost, a male dressed like an angel gives her the dollar she needs. She falls in love with him immediately.

At school the next day, she becomes best friends with a new student, Ouyang Yu Yan. When Xia Ya sees Yu Yan talking to the angel, she discovers that he is actually her brother, Ouyang Lei, a model. He was having a photo shoot when he gave the dollar to Xia Ya.

Being the youngest of the family as well as a famous model, Lei is very spoiled and everyone lets him have his way. When Xia Ya yells at him for not looking at any of the love letters he has, he begins to develop an interest in her.

Because Xia Ya is willing to help others unconditionally, Lei begins to like her more and more.

== Cast ==
- Joe Cheng as Ouyang Lei
- Tsai Yi-chen as Xia Ya
- Ethan Juan as Zhou Qiao Shan
- Zhang Yu Chen as Ouyang Yu Yan
- Sandrine Pinna as Tina
- Alien Huang as Chen Lang Zhu
- Danson Tang as Tian Guang Zhen
- Shin as Sean
- Scott as Kali
- Deng Jiu Yun (鄧九雲) as Mao Xiang Ling
- Chen Wei Min (陳為民) as Jiang An Nu
- Lee Lee-zen as Gui Long Shi
- Guo Ching Chun as Ouyang's mother
- Xia Jin Ting (夏靖庭) as Xia's father
- Chen You Fang (陳幼芳) as Xia's mother
- Hu Huan Wei (胡桓瑋) as Xia Jie
- Ceng Zi Jian (曾子鑑) as Da Pang
- Wu Zhen Ya (吳震雅) as Xiao Pang
- Cai Ming Xun (蔡明勳) as Juan Mao
- Chen Zhen Wei (陳振偉)
- Chen Xiang Ling (陳香伶) as Pei Cen
- Huang Tai An (ep02)
- Zhang Bo Han (章柏翰) as Xia Ya's cousin
- Ma Shi Li (馬世莉) as Cai Jie
- Adriene Lin as Ah Yue

== Soundtrack ==
Summer X Summer

Soundtrack album by Xiao Yu, Shin, Mon, Joe Cheng, Wu Xiong and Tsai Han-tsen
- Released: 27 March 2007
- Genre: Mandopop
- Language: Mandarin
- Label: Avex Taiwan

Summer & Summer Original Soundtrack (熱情仲夏 電視原聲帶) was released on 27 March 2007 by Avex Taiwan with songs by Xiao Yu, Shin, Mon, Joe Cheng, Wu Xiong and Tsai Han-tsen. It contains thirteen songs, of which eight are various instrumental versions. The opening theme song is "你要什麼就說" ("Just Say What You Want") by Xiao Yu (小宇), while the ending theme song is "Lei Le" or "Tired" by Shin.

=== Track listing ===
| No. | Title | Singer(s) | Length |
|---|---|---|---|
| 1. | "Blue Summer inst." |
| 2. | "Summer X Summer" (熱情仲夏) | Xiao Yu (小宇) |
| 3. | "Love Summer inst." |
| 4. | "Just Say What You Want" (你要什麼就說 (Ni Yao Shen Me Jiu Shuo)) | Xiao Yu (小宇) |
| 5. | "Tired For You inst." (只為你累) |
| 6. | "Tired" (累了 (Lei Le)) | Shin |
| 7. | "Play Summer inst." |
| 8. | "Summer Dream inst." (仲夏之夢) |
| 9. | "Loving You" (好好愛我) | Mon |
| 10. | "Love Is You and Me inst." (愛是你 愛是我) |
| 11. | "Give Summer A Kiss" (親夏天一下) | Joe Cheng, Wu Xiong & Tsai Han-tsen |
| 12. | "Love's Playground inst." (愛的遊樂園) |
| 13. | "Missing Summer inst." |

== Books ==
- 23 April 2007: Summer & Summer Photobook (熱情仲夏幕後紀實) - ISBN 978-957-565-775-8
- 15 March 2007: Summer & Summer TV Drama Novel (熱情仲夏電視小說) - ISBN 957-565-772-1

== Promotion ==
- On 17 February 2007, members of the cast appeared in a Chinese New Year television special along with the cast of Hanazakarino Kimitachihe and members of the Taiwanese band Fahrenheit. The show was a competition with a new year theme.
