= It Started with a Kiss (TV series) =

2005 Taiwanese drama

- Promotional poster
- Also known as: 惡作劇之吻; Èzuòjù zhī wěn
- Genre: Romance, Comedy
- Based on: Itazura na Kiss by Kaoru Tada
- Directed by: Chu Yu-ning (瞿友寧)
- Starring: Ariel Lin; Joe Cheng; Jiro Wang
- Opening theme: "Say U Love Me" by Jason and Lara
- Ending theme: "惡作劇" [Practical Joke] by Wang Lan Yin
- Country of origin: Republic of China (Taiwan)
- Original language: Mandarin
- No. of seasons: 1
- No. of episodes: 30

Production
- Executive producer: Jerry Feng
- Production locations: Taipei, Taiwan
- Running time: 70 mins (Sundays at 22:00)
- Production company: Comic Productions Co.

Original release
- Network: CTV
- Release: 25 September 2005 – 12 February 2006

Related
- They Kiss Again (2007, Taiwan); Playful Kiss (2010, South Korea); Mischievous Kiss: Love in Tokyo (2013, Japan); Kiss Me (2015, Thailand); Fall in Love at First Kiss (2019, Chinese-Taiwan)

It Started with a Kiss (Chinese: 惡作劇之吻; pinyin: Èzuòjù zhī wěn) is a Taiwanese drama starring Joe Cheng, Ariel Lin and Jiro Wang of Fahrenheit. It was based on the first 10 volumes of the Japanese manga series Itazura na Kiss (イタズラなKiss, Mischievous Kiss) written by Kaoru Tada. It was produced by Comic Productions (可米國際影視事業股份有限公司) and directed by Chu Yu-ning (瞿友寧). It started filming 6 August 2004 and wrapped 9 June 2005.

It was broadcast on free-to-air China Television (CTV) (中視) in Taiwan from 25 September 2005 to 12 February 2006, every Sunday at 22:00 and cable TV Gala Television (GTV) Variety Show/CH 28 (八大綜合台) 31 September 2005 to 18 February 2006, every Saturday from 21:30 to 23:00.

It Started with a Kiss was a huge success, together with its sequel They Kiss Again, both locally and internationally, pinning it as the truest and one of the most successful adaptations of the manga. Due to the extreme popularity received by the drama and the actors, Joe and Ariel acted together in 3 successful consecutive dramas.

It is the second live-action television adaptation following the Japanese adaptation also titled Itazura na Kiss and followed by its sequel They Kiss Again in 2007 and South Korean adaptation Playful Kiss in 2010. It Started with a Kiss also aired on Hawaii's KIKU Television weekly on Saturdays at 6:00.

== Synopsis ==
Yuan Xiang Qin (Ariel Lin) is a bumbling, intellectually challenged, naïve, but optimistic high school girl. Ever since she met Jiang Zhi Shu (Joe Cheng) at the freshman orientation, she's been in love with the genius with an IQ of 200. After two years of having a crush on him, she finally musters the courage to confess her love to him at school with a love letter. Zhi Shu is not impressed, and Xiang Qin is left humiliated publicly in front of their entire school.

That afternoon, the new house she has just moved into with her father collapsed in a minor earthquake. She and her father are instantly left homeless because they lacked the foresight to pay for earthquake insurance. Fortunately, her father's old college friend extends a helping hand and invites both of them to live at his house. Little does Xiang Qin know that the kind Uncle Li is actually the father of Jiang Zhi Shu.

Because of this unexpected turn of events, Zhi Shu and Xiang Qin begin living their lives under the same roof. Zhi Shu's mother aspires to bring them together, coaxing Zhi Shu into tutoring Xiang Qin and taking numerous pictures of the couple together. Zhi Shu remains cold towards Xiang Qin, thinking her to be one of the dumbest people he has ever met, and refuses to speak to her at school. Through the course of the series, Zhi Shu slowly warms up to Xiang Qin, who tries her hardest to do better in school for him, as they deal with romantic rivals, their futures, and their relationship.

== Main cast ==
Actor	Drama character	Manga character	Relationships
Ariel Lin	Jiang/Yuan Xiang Qin (袁湘琴)	Kotoko Aihara/Irie	Zhi Shu's future wife
Joe Cheng	Jiang Zhi Shu (江直樹)	Naoki Irie	Xiang Qin's crush and Husband
Jiro Wang	Jin Yuan Feng (aka Ah Jin) (金元豐)	Kinnosuke Ikezawa	Zhi Shu's rival
Chang Yung Cheng	Jiang Wan Li (aka Ah Li) (江萬利)	Sigeki Irie	Zhi Shu's father
Cyndi Chaw	Jiang Zhao Zi (aka Ah Li's wife) (阿利嫂)	Machiko Irie	Zhi Shu's mother
Tang Tsung Sheng	Yuan Cai (Ah Cai) (袁有才)	Shigeo Aihara	Xiang Qin's father
Zhang Bo Han	Jiang Yu Shu (江裕樹)	Yuuki Irie	Zhi Shu's brother
Petty Yang	Lin Chun Mei (林純美)	Satomi	Xiang Qin's best friend
Candice Liu	Liu Ya Nong (劉雅儂)	Jinko	Xiang Qin's best friend
Ann Hsu	Pei Zi Yu (裴子瑜)	Yuuko Matsumoto	Xiang Qin's rival
Wang Shih-hsien	Wang Hao Qian (王皓謙)	Sudou	Zhi Shu's college friend
Aaron Yan	Ah Bu (阿布)	Ryo	Chun Mei's boyfriend
Chase Chang	Ah Jie (阿傑)		Liu Ya Nong's boyfriend
Bianca Bai	Bai Hui Lan (白惠蘭)	Sasuiko	The daughter of a wealthy entrepreneur
Austin Zhuang	Child Jiang Zhi Shu		

== Soundtrack ==
It Started with a Kiss

Soundtrack album by Various Artists
- Released: 14 October 2005
- Genre: Mandopop
- Language: Mandarin
- Label: Alfa Music

It Started with a Kiss Original Soundtrack (惡作劇之吻 電視原聲帶) was released on 14 October 2005 by Various Artists under Alfa Music. It contains thirteen songs, in which one song, "Love Ocean" by Ye Qing Long has an English version entitled "Sky". The opening theme song is "Say U Love Me" by Jason and Lara, while the ending theme song is by Wang Lan Yin entitled "惡作劇" or "Practical Joke".

=== Track listing ===
No.	Title	Singer(s)	Length
1.	"Dream Waltz inst."
2.	"Say U Love Me"	Lara Veronin (梁心頤) and Wang Shih-hsien
3.	"Meet" (遇到)	Fang Ya Xian (方雅賢)
4.	"Love Ocean" (愛情海)	Ye Qing Long (葉慶龍)
5.	"Heard" (聽見)	Fang Ya Xian (方雅賢)
6.	"Say U Love Me" (guitar version)
7.	"Come A Little Closer" (靠近一點點)	Lara Veronin (梁心頤)
8.	"Can We" (能不能)	Wang Shih-hsien and Landy Wen (溫嵐)
9.	"The Whole World Could Hear" (全世界的人都知道)	Wang Yu Yun (王俞勻)
10.	"Peaceful World guitar ver." (和平世界)	Lara Veronin (梁心頤) and Wang Shih-hsien
11.	"Regret" (後悔)	He Shu Yu (何書宇)
12.	"Practical Joke" (惡作劇)	Wang Lan Yin (王藍茵)
13.	"Sky" (Love Ocean English ver.)	Ye Qing Long (葉慶龍)

== Reception ==
It Started with a Kiss was a blockbuster hit, both locally and internationally. It was one of the most epic Taiwanese dramas ever made and also one of the most popular Taiwanese dramas to be successful internationally.

Joe Cheng, Ariel Lin and Jiro Wang of Fahrenheit received immense popularity and praises for their roles.

== See also ==
- Itazura na Kiss: The original manga version of the novel.
- Itazura Na Kiss (TV Asahi): Japanese TV drama adaptation in 1996.
- Mischievous Kiss: Love in Tokyo: Japanese TV drama adaptation in 2013.
- They Kiss Again: Sequel of the Taiwanese adaptation.
- Playful Kiss: Korean TV drama adaptation.
- Kiss Me: Thailand TV drama adaptation in 2015.
- Race the World: 2016 Chinese reality show, Lin and Cheng paired up and won the competition
