= Don't Go Breaking My Heart (2011 film) =

2011 Hong Kong-Chinese film by Johnnie To

- Film poster

Chinese name
- Traditional Chinese: 單身男女
- Simplified Chinese: 单身男女
Transcriptions
Standard Mandarin
- Hanyu Pinyin: Dān Shēn Nán Nǚ
Yue: Cantonese
- Jyutping: Daan1 San1 Naam4 Neoi2
- Directed by: Johnnie To; Wai Ka-fai
- Written by: Wai Ka-fai; Yau Nai-hoi; Ray Chan; Jevons Au
- Produced by: Johnnie To; Wai Kai-fai
- Starring: Louis Koo; Daniel Wu; Gao Yuanyuan
- Cinematography: Cheng Siu-Keung; To Hung-mo
- Edited by: David Richardson; Allen Leung
- Music by: Xavier Jamaux
- Production companies: Media Asia Films; China Film Media Asia Audio Video Distribution; Milkyway Image
- Distributed by: Media Asia Distributions
- Release date: 31 March 2011
- Running time: 115 minutes
- Countries: Hong Kong; China
- Languages: Cantonese; Mandarin

Don't Go Breaking My Heart is a 2011 romantic comedy film directed by Johnnie To and Wai Ka-fai, making this the twelfth film they have collaborated on together. A Hong Kong-Chinese co-production, the film stars Louis Koo, Daniel Wu and Gao Yuanyuan. The film opened the 35th Hong Kong International Film Festival on 20 March 2011. It was then released theatrically in Hong Kong on 31 March 2011.

== Plot ==
Chi-yan (Gao Yuanyuan) is an analyst who has recently broken up with her boyfriend and is holding onto many of his belongings, including his pet frog. She meets her ex on a bus and attempts to arrange for him to collect his belongings, but his new girlfriend, upset at her boyfriend seeing another woman, forces Chi-yan off the bus. Now walking, she drops papers in the road and an alcoholic passerby (Daniel Wu) helps her pick them up. She arrives at work and presents a report on an imminent financial crash. After work, she meets the passerby again at a liquor store, and offers him her ex's wine samples. Over the following nights, Chi-yan gives the passerby all of her ex's belongings; he sells them and encourages Chi-yan to spend the proceeds on herself. He takes the frog as a pet. They agree to meet again the next week, when he will show her his work as an architect; Chi-yan implores him not to drink until then.

That week, Chi-yan flirts with Cheung Shen Ran (Louis Koo), an investment firm CEO who works in a neighboring building, by pantomiming through her office window. They agree to a date; Chi-yan goes, only to be stood up. By going, she misses her opportunity to meet the architect again. She berates Shen in his office; later, she sees that Shen has lost his job.

Three years later, Chi-yan arrives at work to find that Shen is her new boss. She is furious and threatens to quit; he responds by taking her out to buy a Maserati sportscar and a high-rise apartment. He professes his love to Chi-yan and the two nearly sleep together before Chi-yan has second thoughts, questioning Shen's loyalty. Shen begins half-heartedly dating other women. Chi-yan notices that the architect to whom she gave the frog now works in the neighboring building. The two go on a date, where Chi-yan learns his name is Fang Qihong, that he has started his own architecture firm, and that he is no longer alcoholic. He professes his love, and states that he would never cheat on her.

Recognizing the romantic rivalry, Shen takes Chi-yan out for a luxurious meal, feigning a professional obligation; when he ogles other women at the restaurant, Chi-yan runs away and meets Qihong. The two fly to Suzhou, where Qihong shows Chi-yan a skyscraper he has designed for her. Chi-yan leaves him to stay with her mother and grandmother in Suzhou. When Qihong returns to work and Chi-yan does not, Shen attacks Qihong, and the frog is killed in the scuffle. Qihong returns to Suzhou and invites Chi-yan to a dinner with his family. During the dinner, Shen climbs a neighboring skyscraper and calls Chi-yan to propose to her. In response, Qihong proposes as well. Chi-yan embraces Qihong.

== Cast ==
Cast	Role	Description
Louis Koo	Sean Cheung 張申然	A CEO of a broker firm and became the boss of Chi Yan after economy crisis.
Gao Yuanyuan	Ching Chi-yan 程子欣	An analyst. She first met Kevin when helping her with her things all over the road, met again and gave Kevin all her ex-boyfriend's things as she just broke off with her boyfriend at that time. Soon met Sean, a CEO of a broker firm who office was opposite of hers.
Daniel Wu	Kevin Fong 方啟宏	An architect who was first messy and untidy as he lost inspiration on designing and started to become an alcoholic before getting back to designing after meeting Chi-yan.
Lam Suet	John	Chi-yan's colleague.
Larisa Bakurova	Angelina	Had a one-night stand with Sean. At first thought Sean was interested in her, but as Sean went and explain that he was interested in another girl, (Chi-yan), seduced him, and eventually broke Sean and Chi-yan off.
JJ Jia	Joyce Kiu 喬伊絲	Kevin's Secretary
Seth Leslie	Mr Ovadia	A Jewish employee of John and Sean who is well known for being spat on by John when Chi-yan arrives in the office back from Shanghai.
Terence Yin		Ching Chi-yan's ex. Got together for 7 years but broke up in the end as he was having an affair and later a baby with another lady.
Selena Li		Ching Chi-yan's rival. Pregnant with Chi-yan's ex's baby.

== Production ==
Daniel Wu was contacted by Johnnie To in May 2010 for his role in the film. Wu was excited to work with To, stating that he's "always wanted to work with him. I've worked with all the big directors in Hong Kong except for him and Wong Kar-wai, and now I can tick Johnnie off my list." The ending of Don’t Go Breaking My Heart was unknown to the actors until the final week of shooting.

== Release ==
Don't Go Breaking My Heart had its world premiere at the 5th Osaka Asian Film Festival on March 10, 2011. Along with Quattro Hong Kong 2, it was the opening film at the Hong Kong International Film Festival. The film was released on March 31, 2011, in Hong Kong and China. It received its North American premiere at the Fantasia Festival in Montreal, Quebec, Canada on July 25, 2011.

== Reception ==
Film Business Asia gave Don't Go Breaking My Heart a six out of ten rating referring to it as an "entertaining but shallow rom-com from Johnnie To that doesn't really engage the emotions". Time Out Hong Kong gave the film a four out of six rating praising the dialogue and "expert comic timing". The Hollywood Reporter opined that "To dazzles with non-stop filmmaking tricks, so many will be happy to forget the disingenuity of the creative premise". Variety referred to the film as "tightly plotted and frequently funny, with suave lead perfs and glossy production design and lensing" while noting that "this mainstream, mostly Mandarin-language pic is squarely aimed at mainland audiences and will do midrange biz in the region, but won't travel much elsewhere."

== Theme songs ==
- "愛很簡單" (Love is Simple) by David Tao

(Used by Sean when expressing his love and proposing to Chi-yan)

- "我願意" (I'm Willing) by Faye Wong

(Used by Kevin when expressing his love and proposing to Chi-yan)
