= Playful Kiss =

2010 South Korean romantic-comedy TV series

- Promotional poster
- Also known as: Mischievous Kiss; Naughty Kiss
- Hangul: 장난스런 키스
- RR: Jangnanseureon kiseu
- MR: Changnansŭrŏn k'isŭ
- Genre: Romance; Comedy
- Based on: Itazura na Kiss by Tada Kaoru
- Written by: Go Eun-nim
- Directed by: Hwang In-roi; Kim Do-hyung
- Starring: Kim Hyun-joong; Jung So-min; Lee Tae-sung; Lee Si-young
- Country of origin: South Korea
- Original language: Korean
- No. of episodes: 16; 7 (YouTube Special Edition)

Production
- Executive producer: Han Hee
- Producer: Song Byung-joon

Original release
- Network: Munhwa Broadcasting Corporation
- Release: September 1 – October 21, 2010

Related
- It Started with a Kiss; Miss in Kiss; Mischievous Kiss: Love in Tokyo; Kiss Me (Thailand) (2015)

Playful Kiss (Korean: 장난스런 키스; RR: Jangnanseureon kiseu), also known as Mischievous Kiss or Naughty Kiss, is a 2010 South Korean romantic-comedy television series, starring Kim Hyun-joong and Jung So-min. It aired on MBC from September 1 to October 21, 2010, on Wednesdays and Thursdays at 21:55 for 16 episodes.

It is based on the Japanese manga Itazura Na Kiss written by Tada Kaoru. The Korean series is the third television adaptation of the manga, following the Taiwanese It Started with a Kiss in 2005, and its sequel They Kiss Again in 2007. Though Playful Kiss received low ratings in South Korea in the five to seven percent range, it was sold to 12 countries in Asia for approximately US$3,400,000 and developed a strong cult following, having been streamed 70 million times on Viki and earning US$400,000 in ad revenue through online streaming. Due to its international popularity, a short special edition was aired on YouTube after the series finale.

== Plot ==
A ditsy and unpopular Oh Ha-Ni (Jung So-Min) is in love with her opposite, Baek Seung-Jo (Kim Hyun-Joong), who is a smart and popular boy and never accepts her feelings. Tension rises when Oh Ha-Ni and her dad have to live in the same home as Baek Seung-Jo and his parents due to unexpected reasons

== Cast ==
=== Main characters ===
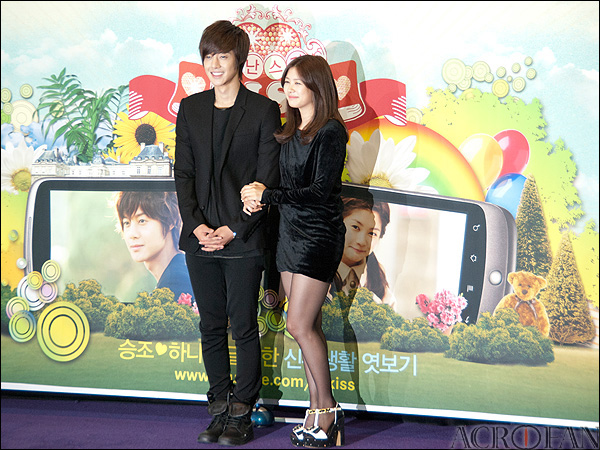
Kim Hyun-Joong and Jung So-min at the premiere of Playful Kiss.

- Kim Hyun-joong as Baek Seung-jo

Baek Seung-jo is the smartest and the most handsome guy in the high school. He is rumored to have an IQ of 200, but has a cold attitude. Ha-ni writes him a love letter, which he rejects, claiming he hates stupid girls. When Ha-ni and her father move in with his family, he continues his cold attitude towards her, but warms up to her over time and slowly falls for her. Eventually, he proposes to Ha-ni and decides to be a doctor instead of inheriting his father's gaming company.

- Jung So-min as Oh Ha-ni

Oh Ha-ni is not a very bright girl who struggles academically and is at the bottom of her class. She has had a crush on Baek Seung-jo, the smartest and most handsome boy in the whole school, for three years. One day, Ha-ni decides to write a love letter for Seung-jo, but Seung-jo rejects her publicly, correcting the grammar in her letter. Fate happens when an earthquake strikes Ha-ni's newly built home, and they are invited to stay with her father's childhood friend, who happens to be Seung-jo's father. Seung-jo is cold to her at first, but he eventually falls for her, and their relationship develops. She later marries Seung-jo and decides to become a nurse.

- Lee Tae-sung as Bong Joon-gu

Bong Joon-gu has been in love with Oh Ha-ni since his first year of High School. He loves her so much that he follows her everywhere and encourages her, hoping that she will feel the same way. He is devastated when he finds out Ha-ni is dating Seung-jo, but he does not give up on her until he finds out that she is marrying Seung-jo. However, he later meets a girl named Chris who has a crush on him, and they start a relationship at the end of the series.

- Lee Si-young as Yoon Hae-ra

She is considered to be Baek Seung-jo's female equivalent. She is smart, good-looking and good at tennis like Seung-jo. She takes an interest in him at college, but decides to give up on him when Seung-jo and Ha-ni get married. She later shows interest in Kwang Kyung-soo, the tennis club's vice-president.

=== Supporting characters ===
Baek and Oh families

- Jung Hye-young as Hwang Geum-hee, Seung-jo's mother
- Oh Kyung-soo as Baek Soo-chang, Seung jo's father
- Choi Won-hong as Baek Eun-jo, Seung-jo's brother
- Kang Nam-gil as Oh Ki-dong, Ha-ni's father

Tennis club

- Choi Sung-kook as Kwang Kyung-soo
- Yoon Bo-hyun as the tennis team captain

Extended cast

- Hong Yoon-hwa as Jung Joo-ri, Ha-ni's best friend.
- Yoon Seung-ah as Dokgo Min-ah, Ha-ni's best friend.
- Choi Sung-joon as Kim Gi-tae.
- Jang Ah-young as Hong Jang-mi.
- Bye Bye Sea as Bong Joon-gu's followers.
- Hwang Hyo-eun as Song Kang-yi, Ha-ni's homeroom teacher.
- Kang Doo as Song Ji-oh.
- Moon Hoe-won as Head Teacher Hwang.
- Abigail Alderete as Chris.

== Reception ==
=== Ratings ===
Episode #	Original broadcast date	Average audience share			
Episode #	Original broadcast date	TNmS Ratings		AGB Nielsen	
Episode #	Original broadcast date	Nationwide	Seoul National Capital Area	Nationwide	Seoul National Capital Area
1	2010 September 1	3.5%	3.8%	3.6%	4.2%
2	2010 September 2	3.6%	4.5%	3.7%	4.6%
3	2010 September 8	3.2%	3.6%	3.5%	3.9%
4	2010 September 9	3.2%	4.2%	3.4%	4.4%
5	2010 September 15	3.4%	3.9%	3.0%	3.5%
6	2010 September 16	3.0%	4.1%	2.8%	3.9%
7	2010 September 22	5.8%	7.0%	6.3%	7.5%
8	2010 September 23	6.0%	6.4%	5.8%	6.2%
9	2010 September 29	4.0%	4.8%	4.5%	5.3%
10	2010 September 30	8.2%	8.8%	7.5%	8.1%
11	2010 October 6	5.4%	6.1%	5.6%	6.3%
12	2010 October 7	4.9%	5.8%	5.7%	6.6%
13	2010 October 13	5.9%	6.1%	6.0%	6.2%
14	2010 October 14	6.4%	8.3%	5.6%	7.5%
15	2010 October 20	6.0%	7.0%	6.1%	7.1%
16	2010 October 21	6.0%	7.0%	5.9%	6.9%
Average		4.9%	5.7%	4.9%	5.7%

=== Awards and nominations ===
Year	Award	Category	Recipient	Result
2010	Korean Culture and Entertainment Awards	Best New Actress for TV	Jung So-min	Won
2010	MBC Drama Awards	Popularity Award	Kim Hyun-joong	Won
2010	MBC Drama Awards	Best New Actor	Lee Tae-sung	Won
2010	MBC Drama Awards	Best New Actress	Jung So-min	Nominated
2010	MBC Drama Awards	Excellence Award, Actor	Kim Hyun-joong	Nominated

== Soundtrack ==
Playful Kiss OST Part 1
No.	Title	Length
1.	"Will You Kiss Me (키스해줄래)" (G.NA)
2.	"Will You Kiss Me (키스해줄래) (Inst.)" (G.NA)

Playful Kiss OST Part 2
No.	Title	Length
1.	"One More Time" (Kim Hyun-joong)
2.	"One More Time (Inst.)" (Kim Hyun-joong)

Playful Kiss OST Part 3
No.	Title	Length
1.	"Saying I Love You (사랑한다 말할까)" (Soyou (SISTAR))
2.	"Saying I Love You (사랑한다 말할까) (Inst.)" (Soyou (SISTAR))

Playful Kiss OST
No.	Title	Length
1.	"Kiss Kiss Kiss" (Pink ToniQ)
2.	"One More Time" (Kim Hyun-joong)
3.	"Will You Kiss Me (키스해줄래)" (G.NA)
4.	"I Called You (널 부른다)" (RUN)
5.	"Try Again" (Pink ToniQ)
6.	"Talking to Yourself (혼잣말)" (Lee Tae-sung)
7.	"Saying I Love You (사랑한다 말할까)" (Soyou (SISTAR))
8.	"Overture for Mischievous Kiss (장난스런 키스)" (Various Artists)
9.	"I Love You (Main Theme)" (Various Artists)
10.	"Confession (고백)" (Various Artists)
11.	"Oh! Chef" (Various Artists)
12.	"Run, Run, Run" (Various Artists)
13.	"Marriage" (Various Artists)
14.	"Love Theme" (Various Artists)
15.	"With Friends" (Various Artists)
16.	"Love Waltz" (Various Artists)
17.	"Campus Life" (Various Artists)
18.	"Love and Sorrow" (Various Artists)
19.	"Shadow (그림자)" (Various Artists)
20.	"Miss More (그리워할수록)" (Various Artists)
21.	"Excitement (설레임)" (Various Artists)

Playful Kiss OST Special Edition Part 1
No.	Title	Length
1.	"Palpitations (두근두근)" (Park Boram, Kim So-jung, & Lee Bo-ram)
2.	"Palpitations (두근두근) (Inst.)" (Park Boram, Kim So-jung, & Lee Bo-ram)

Playful Kiss OST Special Edition Part 2
No.	Title	Length
1.	"Have I Told You (말한 적 있나요)" (Howl)

== Epilogue ==
To show Ha-ni and Seung-jo's married life, Playful Kiss: Special Edition was released on YouTube beginning November 2, 2010. The seven 10-minute webisodes were subtitled in English, Japanese, Chinese, and Spanish, among others. The online series was popular, with the first episode initially receiving over 1,000,000 hits in the first two days, and over 19,000,000 hits (and counting) for the entire 7 episodes. Kim Hyun-joong was later interviewed by Anna Coren on CNN's TalkAsia in which he discussed the significance of YouTube in spreading awareness about Korean culture.

== Theatrical version ==
On October 19, 2012, it was announced that the drama would be edited down into a film version. This theatrical edition was released exclusively in Japan on a limited run to selected theaters in Tokyo and Osaka in December 2012. It was screened with the original Korean dialogue with subtitles in Japanese. Afterwards, a DVD of the theatrical edition was also released in Japan.
