= Larisa Bakurova =

Ukrainian-Taiwanese actress and model (born 1985)

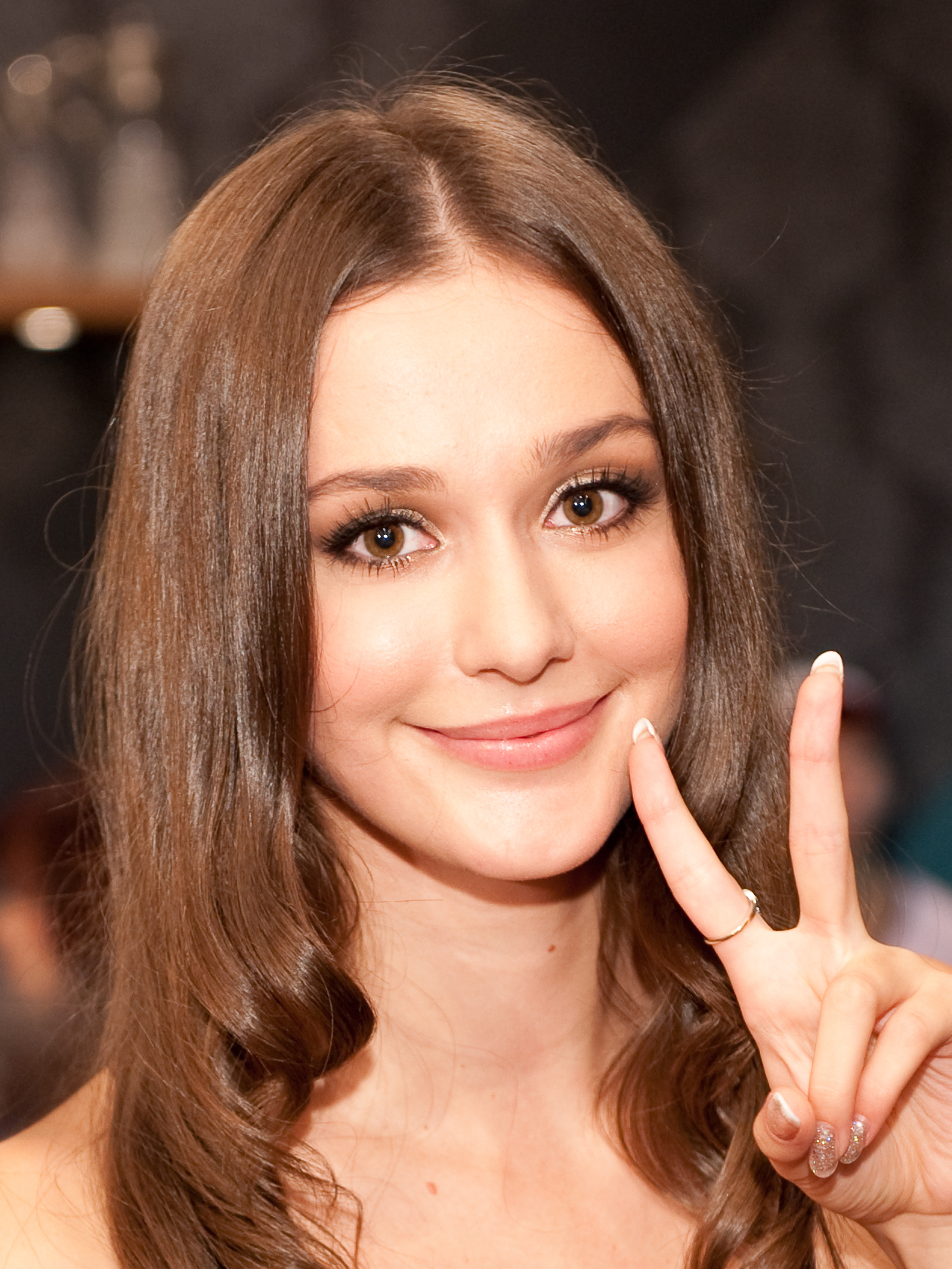
- Bakurova in 2009
- Born: Larisa Angela Bakurova; February 21, 1985 (age 41); Odesa Oblast, Ukrainian SSR, Soviet Union
- Citizenship: Soviet Union (until 1991); Ukraine (1991–2019); Taiwan (since 2019)
- Education: Odesa National Economics University
- Occupations: Actress; model
- Years active: 2001–present
- Spouse: Mike Li (m. 2015)
- Children: 2

Chinese name
- Traditional Chinese: 李瑞莎
- Simplified Chinese: 李瑞莎
Transcriptions
Standard Mandarin
- Hanyu Pinyin: Lǐ Ruìshā

Larisa Angela Bakurova (Ukrainian: Лариса Анжела Бакурова, Chinese: 李瑞莎; pinyin: Lǐ Ruìshā, commonly shortened to 瑞莎, Ruìshā; born February 21, 1985) is a Ukrainian-born Taiwanese actress and model. She is the first naturalized Taiwanese citizen of Ukrainian descent.

== Early life ==
Bakurova started training for rhythmic gymnastics at age 3. At age 6, she entered Deriugins School in Kyiv. She has won numerous national competitions until she got injured at 16.

She won Miss Kyiv at the age of 18.

She graduated from Odesa National Economics University with a master's degree in economics.

== Career ==
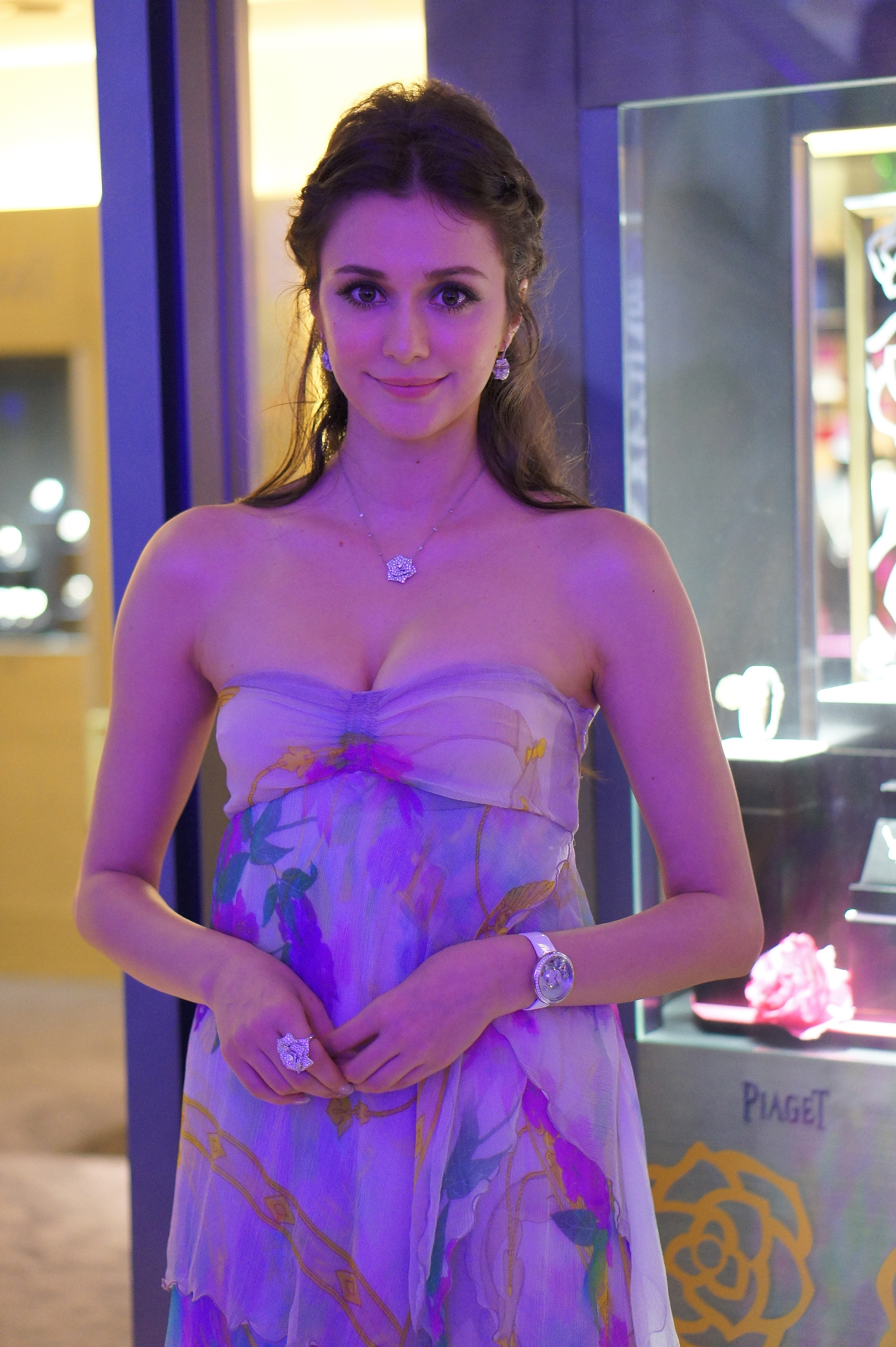
Bakurova in 2012

Besides her modeling engagements, she has appeared in supporting roles in the Taiwanese drama They Kiss Again and the film Don't Go Breaking My Heart. In 2012, Bakurova starred in the film Young Dudes directed by DJ Chen Yin-Jung.

In 2020, she started her own rhythmic gymnastics gym Rising Star RG in Taiwan. Besides coaching, she would also invite professional rhythmic gymnasts such as Anna Bessonova to host workshops.

Since 2023, she led her female gymnastics team to Miss Valentine competition for junior female gymnasts.

== Personal life ==
In 2013, Bakurova obtained the Taiwan Permanent Resident Certificate and began the naturalization process. She married a Taiwanese national in 2015 and gave birth to daughters in 2016 and in 2022.

On January 24, 2019, Bakurova became the first naturalized Taiwanese citizen of Ukrainian descent, which required a long process to renounce her Ukrainian citizenship since Ukraine does not have a consulate in Taiwan.

== Filmography ==
=== Television ===
Year	English title	Mandarin title	Role
2007	They Kiss Again	惡作劇2	Christine Robinson
2009	Knock Knock Loving You	敲敲愛上你	Guan Xi's girlfriend
2009	Momo Love	桃花小妹	Ancient beauty
2015	The Crossing Hero	超級大英雄	Xu Fei

=== Film ===
Year	English title	Mandarin title	Role
2011	Don't Go Breaking My Heart	單身男女	Angelina
2011	The Hole	洞	Herself
2012	Young Dudes	騷人	Adele

=== Music video ===
Year	Artist	Song
2004	Stanley Huang	我是你的誰 (Your Whom Am I?)
2004	Show Luo	機器娃娃 (Robot Doll)
2005	Will Liu	心靈交戰 (Spiritual Battle)
2006	Samuel Tai	藍色貝殼 (The Shell in Blue Color)
2006	Jay Chou	迷迭香 (Rosemary)
2008	Yoga Lin	病態 (Sickness)
2008	Derrick Hoh	咬字 (Pronunciation)
2009	Andy Hui	如果，，，如果，，，(If...If...)
2011	Van Ness Wu	命定 (Meant to Be)
2012	Steve Chou	離開昨天 (Leaving Yesterday)
