= Death Note: New Generation =

2016 Japanese TV series

- DVD cover
- Genre: Drama; Occult detective Psychological thriller
- Based on: Death Note by: Tsugumi Ohba; Takeshi Obata
- Written by: Katsunari Mano
- Directed by: Shinsuke Sato
- Starring: Masahiro Higashide; Sosuke Ikematsu; Masaki Suda
- Voices of: miyano monaro
- Music by: Yutaka Yamada
- Country of origin: Japan
- Original language: Japanese
- No. of episodes: 3

Production
- Running time: 20 minutes

Original release
- Network: Hulu Japan
- Release: September 16 – September 30, 2016

Related
- L: Change the World; Death Note: Light Up the New World

Death Note: New Generation (Japanese: デスノート; NEW GENERATION) is a Japanese supernatural psychological thriller live-action web series, based on the manga series Death Note written by Tsugumi Ohba and illustrated by Takeshi Obata. It is a sequel to the 2006 film Death Note 2: The Last Name and the predecessor to 2016's Death Note: Light Up the New World film. The three-episode series was released weekly on Hulu Japan beginning on September 16, 2016.

== Plot ==
Three stories about the investigator Mishima, called the Death Note otaku, who encounters a case where a former criminal died of stroke and he closes in on the truth; L's successor, the famous international sleuth Ryuzaki who has solved numerous difficult cases, decides to assist in a Death Note case that he has continuously refused despite repeated requests; and cyber terrorist Shien, who became a follower of "Kira" after he was set free from the trauma of being the only one who survived the brutal murder of his family, attempts to use the Death Note for the first time.

== Cast ==
- Masahiro Higashide as Tsukuru Mishima, leader of the Death Note task force.
- Sosuke Ikematsu as Ryūzaki, the original successor to L.
- Masaki Suda as Yūki Shien, a cyber-terrorist who worships Kira.
- Rina Kawaei as Sakura Aoi, a Death Note owner.
- Sota Aoyama as Tōta Matsuda, a young detective who experienced the Kira case 10 years ago.
- Mina Fujii as Shō Nanase, the only female member in the Death Note task force.
- Noémie Nakai as J, a woman from Wammy's House.
- Daisuke Sakaguchi as Near, a boy from Wammy's House.
- Nakamura Shidō II as Ryuk (voice), a shinigami, who has returned to Earth after 10 years.
- Tomoya Nakamura as Taichi Kanagawa aka Taichi Amazawa, murderer of a girl and a victim of the Death Note.
- Tatsuya Fujiwara as Light Yagami (cameo), the original Kira, who was killed by Shinigami Ryuk.
- Kenichi Matsuyama as L, the greatest detective, who died by suicide as a result of battling Kira, Light Yagami.
- Suzuka Morita as Karin Kintomo (episode 2).

== Episodes ==
| No. | Title | Original release date |
|---|---|---|
| 1 | "Mishima's Chapter: Rebirth"; Transliteration: "Mishima Hen: Shinsei" (Japanese: 三島篇・新生) | September 16, 2016 |
Tsukuru Mishima, recruited by Soichiro Yagami, joins Death Note Countermeasure Task Force, which continues to operate to look in new Death Note murders while Japan has fallen in fear knowing that a new Kira has appeared 10 years after the death of Light Yagami. The episode ends with a falling half eaten apple by Ryuk.
| 2 | "Ryūzaki's Chapter: Dying Wish"; Transliteration: "Ryuzaki Hen: Ishi" (Japanese: 竜崎篇・遺志) | September 23, 2016 |
Ryūzaki, the original successor to L, investigates a case regarding a locked-room murder in Hong Kong. Later, J, a woman from Wammy's House requests Ryūzaki to investigate another locked-room murder case, made up by a Death Note. Ryūzaki confronts two Death Note users, Yuki Shien and Sakura Aoi. At the end of the episode, Ryūzaki reveals the promise he once made to L that he wouldn't use the Death Note at any cost with a flashback of L.
| 3 | "Shien's Chapter: Fanaticism"; Transliteration: "Shien Hen: Kyōshin" (Japanese: 紫苑篇・狂信) | September 30, 2016 |
Yūki Shien's family were killed. After the incident, he becomes a cyber-terrorist. He later receives a Death Note from Ryuk and begins worshiping Kira. He finds another Death Note owner with his hacking ability, Sakura Aoi. Ryuk says, "Humans are interesting."
