= Mischievous Kiss: Love in Tokyo =

2013 Japanese drama

- Also known as: イタズラなKiss – Love in TOKYO; Itazura na Kiss: Love in Tokyo; ItaKiss
- Itazura na Kiss: Love in Tokyo
- Genre: Romance, Comedy
- Based on: Itazura na Kiss by Kaoru Tada
- Starring: Honoka Miki; Yuki Furukawa
- Opening theme: "Update" by Sabao (Season 1); "KISS KISS KISS" by Cyntia (Season 2)
- Ending theme: "Takaramono" by Sabao (Season 1); "White Stock" by Cyntia (Season 2)
- Country of origin: Japan
- Original language: Japanese
- No. of seasons: 2
- No. of episodes: 32 episodes + 1 special

Production
- Production locations: Tokyo; Okinawa; Kobe

Original release
- Network: Fuji TV
- Release: March 29, 2013 – April 7, 2015

Related
- Mischievous Kiss 2 ~ Love In Okinawa (Special Episode); Mischievous Kiss 2: Love in Tokyo; It Started with a Kiss (Taiwan); Playful Kiss (South Korea); Kiss Me (Thailand); Miss in Kiss (China)

Mischievous Kiss: Love in Tokyo (Japanese: イタズラなKiss〜Love in TOKYO, Hepburn: Itazura na Kiss: Love in Tokyo) is a 2013 Japanese television drama based on the manga Itazura na Kiss by Kaoru Tada. Starring Honoka Yahagi (Note: Credited as Honoka Miki.) and Yuki Furukawa in the lead roles, it aired on Fuji Television from March 29, 2013, to July 19, 2013, with 16 episodes. In early October 2013, it was announced on the official website of Mischievous Kiss: Love in Tokyo that the series was renewed for a second season. It was announced that a special titled Love in Okinawa would air on September 12, 2014. The second season began airing on November 24, 2014. The anime streaming service Crunchyroll acquired the streaming rights on January 6, 2014.

== Background ==
It is based on the manga Itazura Na Kiss written and illustrated by Tada Kaoru. The Japanese soap opera is the fifth television adaptation of the manga, following the Japanese live-action Itazura na Kiss in 1996, the Taiwanese It Started with a Kiss in 2005, its sequel They Kiss Again in 2007, Korean Playful Kiss in 2010, the Thai Kiss Me in 2015, and the Chinese Miss in Kiss in 2016.

== Series storyline ==
=== Season 1 ===
Kotoko Aihara (Honoka Yahagi), a teenage girl who lost her mother at a young age and lives with her father, who owns his Japanese family restaurant, isn't very intelligent and lacks ability in school. She is in class F, the least intelligent class in her grade. Despite this, she has been in love with Tonan High School's most intelligent and popular guy, Naoki Irie (Yuki Furukawa), ever since she saw him give a speech at the high school entrance ceremony.

In her senior year of high school, she writes him a love letter and proposes him to be her friend in front of the whole school but is rejected by Naoki instantly without even reading it. On the same day, Kotoko's house is hit by a shooting star and collapses. When her classmates launch a charity fundraising campaign to help her, Naoki steps in to contribute money and is bluntly criticized by her and her friends. As the house is being rebuilt, her dad gets a phone call from his longtime friend and is invited to stay with them. When she arrives, she is in shock to see that this is the house of Naoki Irie and his family. Naoki came from a wealthy, well-educated family; his father is the CEO of the Pandai video game distribution corporation. Although Kotoko and her father received thoughtful treatment from the Irie family, she couldn't escape Naoki's indifference and coldness, and the contempt from Naoki's younger brother, Yuuki. Despite Naoki's coldness towards Kotoko, she couldn't give up her special feelings for him.

Besides Kotoko are her two close friends, Jinko and Satomi, who always support her wholeheartedly, and Kinnosuke (whom Kotoko called "Kin-chan"), who secretly harbors unrequited love for her, while she has an unrequited love for Naoki. Part 1 revolves around the turning points in their school life and love.

=== Season 2 ===
After countless hardships and suffering, Kotoko and Naoki officially marries and enjoys their honeymoon in Okinawa. Part 2 of the series revolves around their married life and college, new friends and rivals, and their adult and career aspirations. Naoki switches to medical school to become a doctor, and Kotoko studies to become a nurse, supporting Naoki's work.

== Cast ==
=== Main cast ===
- Honoka Yahagi as Kotoko Aihara

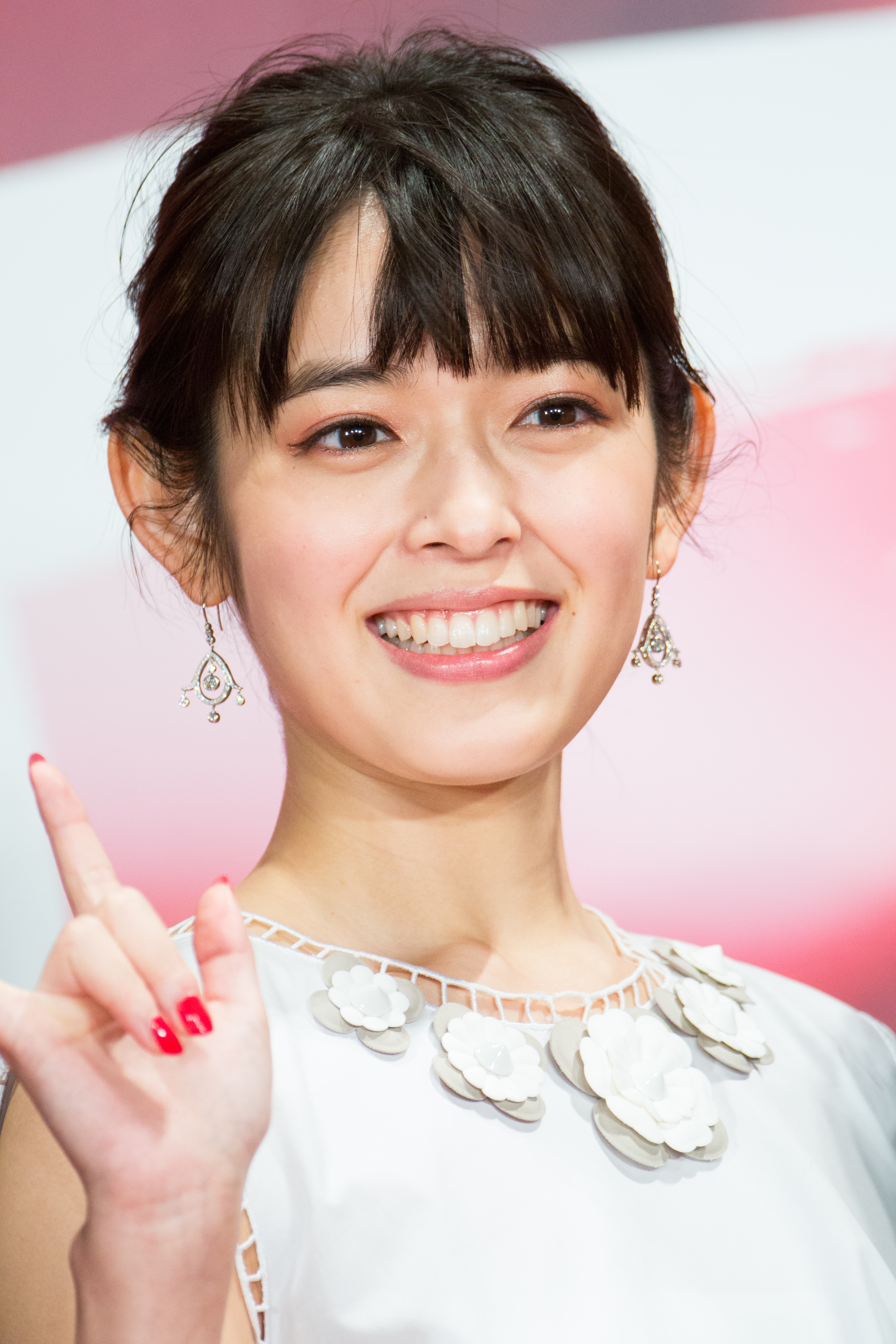
Honoka Yahagi, who plays the role of Kotoko Aihara

The film's protagonist, Kotoko, lost her mother at the age of four and lives with her father, a chef and owner of a Japanese family restaurant. Kotoko is innocent and naive, not particularly intelligent, but always strives for success. She has had a crush on Irie Naoki since watching him give a speech at her high school's opening ceremony, confessed her feelings to him unsuccessfully, and eventually moved in with Irie after their own home collapsed. Kotoko doesn't hesitate to confront Naoki about many things, but she can't let go of her special feelings for him. She has two close friends, Jinko and Satomi, who wholeheartedly support her, and she befriends Kinnosuke, who has also harbored a crush on her for many years.

- Yuki Furukawa as Naoki Irie

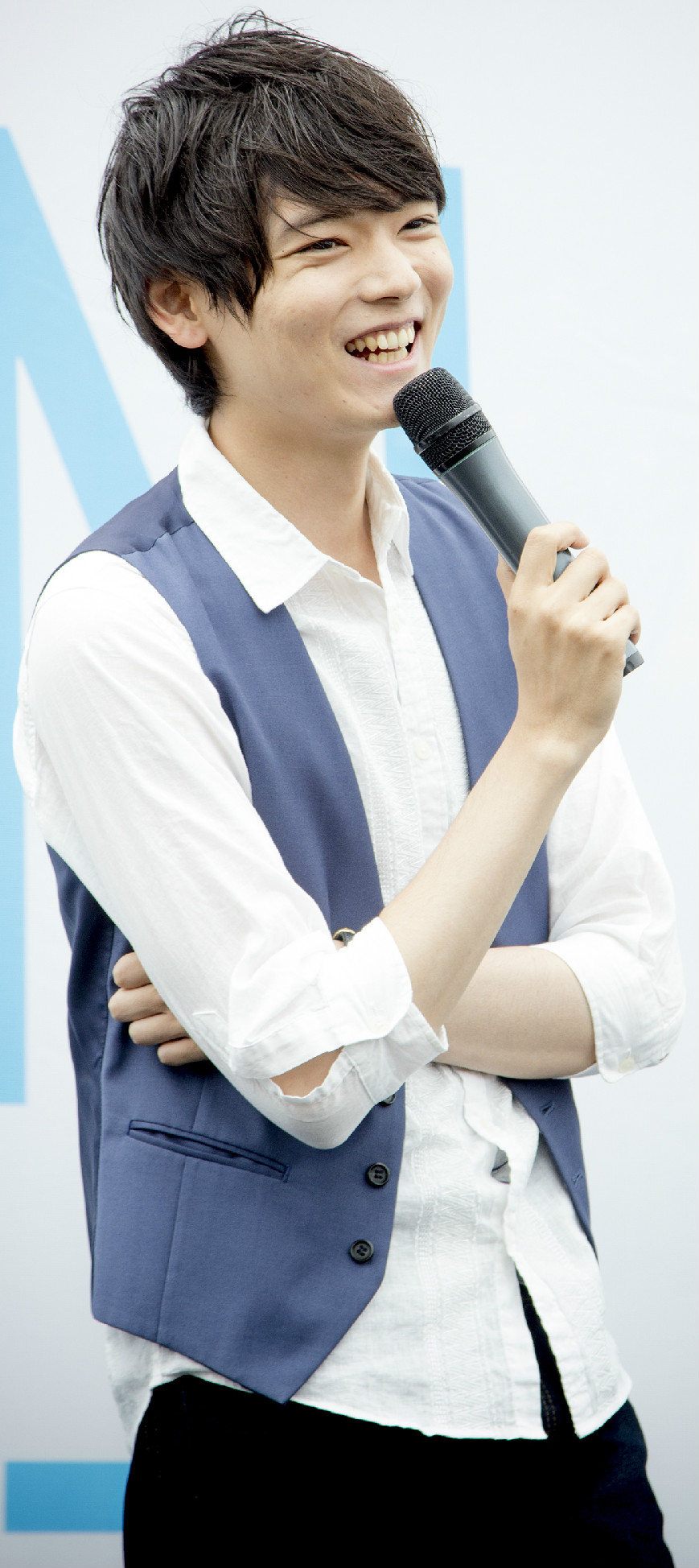
Yuki Furukawa, who plays the role of Naoki Irie

The male protagonist of the series, Naoki, is the most talented and popular boy at Tonan High School, possessing an IQ of 200 and admired by many girls and women from high school to university. Naoki comes from a wealthy and well-educated family, his father being the CEO of a large video game corporation. Although he is known as a "genius" with his superior intelligence and academic achievements, along with his illustrious reputation, he has low EQ and is unable to understand or express his own emotions. During high school, Naoki is known for his lack of interest in girls and his cold and mean attitude towards Kotoko. During the time he lives with Kotoko, Naoki admits that Kotoko changes him, helping him experience basic human emotions (like excitement and anxiety) that he had never felt before, and contributing to the development of his feelings for Kotoko. Because of Naoki's exceptional talent, he is also overly protected by his parents and expected to take over his father's company, making him afraid to confess his dream of becoming a doctor to them, though he later reveals his dream to Kotoko.

=== Supporting cast ===
- Yuki Yamada as Kinnosuke "Kin-chan" Ikezawa

Kinnosuke is Kotoko's best friend and classmate. He has had a crush on Kotoko for many years and is willing to do anything for her, even sacrifice himself. His friends call him "Kin-chan." Due to low grades, Kinnosuke failed to get into university and instead became a chef at Aihara's family restaurant thanks to her encouragement. Kinnosuke clashes with Naoki because of Naoki's cold treatment and attitude towards Kotoko, knowing that Kotoko loves Naoki. Kinnosuke has tried many ways to win Kotoko's heart, including proposing to her when Naoki was planning to marry Sahoko, but ultimately failed because of her intense love for Naoki. In Season 2, Kinnosuke works in the cafeteria of Tonan University and befriends with Christine Robbins, a British exchange student.

- Nanami Fujimoto as Jinko Komori

Jinko is one of Kotoko's best friends. She usually wears headphones around her neck and, along with Satomi, she looks out for Kotoko and adores her. Jinko is very into music, supported by her equally musical boyfriend. She has a habit of telling people things that are supposedly meant to be kept secret — such as when she told Naoki's mother that he and Kotoko had kissed and when she told Naoki that Kin-chan had proposed to Kotoko. She is well aware of Kotoko's feelings for Naoki and despite being aware of his cold attitude toward her, supports her friend to pursue this love.

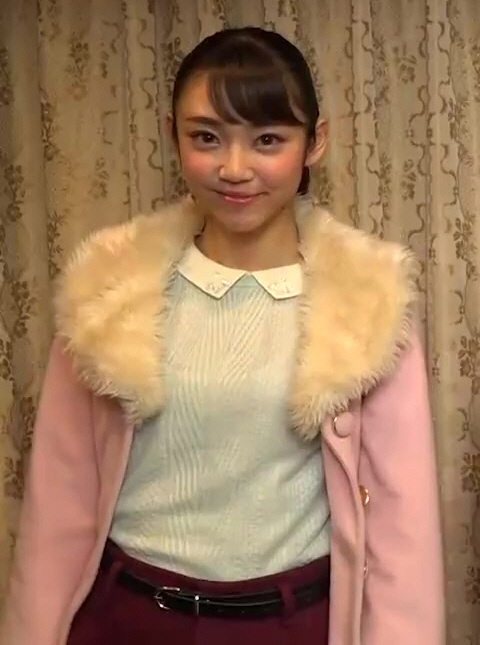
Kasumi Yamaya, who plays the role of Satomi Ishikawa

- Kasumi Yamaya as Satomi Ishikawa

Satomi is one of Kotoko's closest friends. She is passionate about design and dreams of working for a women's magazine.

- Tomomi Nishimura as Noriko Irie

Noriko Irie, who is referred to as "Mama" by her husband, is the mother of Naoki and Yuuki. She loves Kotoko more than anyone because she has always wanted a daughter and treats Kotoko as her own from day one. She acts very young and can be somewhat immature. She is a lot younger than her husband and is very bubbly, energetic and positive. When she first found out Kotoko loved Naoki, she was very happy and from there she would stop at nothing to make sure they end up together. She supports Kotoko in her endeavour to win Naoki's heart, aiming to foil anyone else's plans to get close to him. She can sometimes be seen as a bit controlling, in the sense that Naoki moved out because he wanted to live his own life and not one that his parents planned out for him. Despite this, she really loves her family and is ecstatic when Naoki confesses and proposes to Kotoko.

- Koura Kazumasa as Shigeki Irie

Referred to by Mama Irie as "Papa", Shigeki Irie is the father of Naoki and Yuuki, and also a longtime friend of Kotoko's father. He is a very jolly man, which surprises Kotoko because he looks and acts nothing like Naoki. He is hard working and is the head of a large company, which Naoki is supposed to take over in the future. He is somewhat controlling of Naoki's life, raising him to be his successor, though his son thinks differently. When he collapses due to health problems, Naoki takes over the company. It escalates to a point where he almost allows Naoki to marry the company partner's granddaughter to save the company. In the end, he supports Naoki's wishes to marry Kotoko instead (being fond of her cheerfulness) and allows Naoki to pursue his dream to become a doctor.

- Yuga Aizawa (until season 2, episode 12) / Yoshiaki Miyagi (from season 2, episode 13) as Yuuki Irie

Yuuki is Naoki's younger brother. He takes after Naoki and looks up to him, which makes him act cold toward Kotoko when she first moves in. As an elementary school student, in season 1, he is a genius and is smarter than Kotoko. Yuuki's room was given to Kotoko when she moved in and so Yuuki had to share a room with Naoki. Yuuki is diagnosed with appendictis and is rushed to hospital by Kotoko who was looking after him alone. This resulted in Naoki's interest in becoming a doctor and eventually changing his university course to study medicine. Yuuki witnesses Naoki kissing Kotoko from his hospital bed. In season 2, Yuuki attends Tonan Middle School and has his own room in the new house. He is befriended by Konomi Sagawa, a girl from F class, whom he reluctantly helps to study.

- Yoji Tanaka as Shigeru Aihara

Shigeru Aihara is the father of Kotoko. He works as a chef at his own restaurant named Aihara. He is good friends with Naoki's father. Mr. Aihara cares about his daughter very much and knows that Kotoko's love for Irie is one sided. On multiple occasions throughout the series, Mr. Aihara suggests that he and Kotoko move out of the Irie's house as he worries for his daughter. In season 1, Mr. Aihara employs Kin-chan after high school, Kotoko also does part-time work for his restaurant. In season 2, Chris works at Aihara's restaurant as well.

- Kanna Mori as Yuko Matsumoto

Yuko is one of Kotoko's rivals. She also likes Naoki. She is very good at tennis and convinces Naoki to join the tennis team with her. Yuko is very smart and beautiful but she chooses to go to a college that is below her standards is because she has been secretly in love with Naoki when she was in high school.

- Riho Takada as Sahoko Oizumi

Sahoko is Naoki's fiancé near the end of the first season of the series who has been described by Naoki as "perfectly fit" for him. She also fells in love with him at first sight. Sahoko is very jealous of Kotoko because Naoki's mother incredibly loves Kotoko.

==== Season 2 ====
- Noémie Nakai as Christine Robbins

Christine, who appears in the second season of the series and is referred to as "Chris", is a foreign exchange student from England. She has a blonde hair and is fluent in both English and Japanese. Chris initially meets Kotoko at the university where Kotoko studies looking for directions and becomes friends with her. She also meets Kinnosuke and quickly falls in love with him when she, Kotoko, and Naoki, meets for dinner in Kotoko's father's restaurant. As Chris tries to convince Kinnosuke to accept her love, Kinnosuke also constantly denies, says that he is still secretly in love with Kotoko, despite she is already married with Naoki, and that he cannot accept anyone else's love, which turns down Chris's feelings. When Chris is about to board her flight back to England, Kinnosuke quickly runs to the airport and shouts out his love for her, which holds Chris's back to him. Chris later works at the university's cafeteria along with Kinnosuke and gently develops their mutual love.

- Horii Arata as Keita Kamogari

Kotoko's classmate at nursing school, with a strong passion of becoming the best nurse in Japan. He develops strong feelings for Kotoko when observing how she is terribly ignored and discouraged by Naoki, and strives to pursue and make up for her pain caused by Naoki, but eventually gives up when seeing that Naoki admits his jealousy to Kotoko and makes up for the pain he caused for Kotoko.

- Mirai Suzuki as Motoki Kikyo

Kotoko's classmate at nursing school, referred to as "Moto-chan", a gay man who has the personality of a woman at heart. He is a big fan of Naoki Irie and roots hard for Kotoko and Naoki's love.

- Juria Kawakami as Marina Shinagawa

Kotoko's classmate at nursing school with a passionate personality, with a desire of marrying rich and intelligent men so her children can inherit exceptional DNA.

- Toshi Takeuchi as Seiichi Funatsu

Naoki's classmate at medical school who always competes with him to become the "number 1", befriends with Marina Shinagawa, and has a personality of a nerd.

=== Guest stars ===
- Aiko Sato as Nurse Kotoko Irie

The actress who portrayed Kotoko Aihara in the original series that aired in 1996. She was seen in Episode 10, talking to Kotoko while recalling her memories when she was at their age.

- Takashi Kashiwabara as Doctor Naoki Irie

The actor who portrayed Naoki Irie in the original series that aired in 1996. He was seen in Episode 15.

== Episodes ==
=== Season 1 (2013) ===
No.	Title	Original release date
1	"A Love Along with a Shooting Star"	March 29, 2013
2	"Introduction of Love Exam"	April 5, 2013
3	"Does Morning Coffee Smell of Love?"	April 12, 2013
4	"Chocolate Is a Love Amulet"	April 19, 2013
5	"Who Will Get the First Kiss?"	April 26, 2013
6	"A Rival Emerges!? Love With a Lot of Trouble"	May 10, 2013
7	"Love Aced"	May 17, 2013
8	"A Sudden First Date"	May 24, 2013
9	"Time to Give Up My Love"	May 31, 2013
10	"A Confession on a Snowy Night"	June 7, 2013
11	"My Boyfriend is Santa Claus"	June 14, 2013
12	"Beyond Each Dream"	June 21, 2013
13	"A Mischief of Fate"	June 28, 2013
14	"A Fork in the Path of Love"	July 5, 2013
15	"Goodbye, Irie"	July 12, 2013
16	"A Miracle from a Shooting Star"	July 19, 2013

=== Season 2 (2014–2015) ===
No.	Title	Original release date
1	"A Turbulent Honeymoon"	November 24, 2014
2	"My Marriage Still on Hold?!"	December 1, 2014
3	"Hello Baby!?"	December 15, 2014
4	"Excited First Date"	December 22, 2014
5	"Extreme!? Mates in White Coat"	December 29, 2014
6	"A Genius and Jealousy"	January 5, 2015
7	"A Vow with a Nurse Cap"	January 12, 2015
8	"Rivalry with Grandma Toyo"	January 19, 2015
9	"Here Comes a Cute Little Vixen"	January 26, 2015
10	"Naoki-san, Counting of You for Kotoko"	February 2, 2015
11	"Goodbye Kiss"	February 16, 2015
12	"And Love in KOBE"	February 23, 2015
13	"Overstep Flowers and Storm"	March 2, 2015
14	"Love and Fight"	March 9, 2015
15	"Proposal with Tears"	March 16, 2015
16	"The Best Birthday Gift"	March 23, 2015

== Awards and nominations ==
Year	Award	Category	Nominees	Result	Ref.
2013	2nd Annual DramaFever Awards	Best Couple	Honoka Yahagi; Yuki Furukawa	Nominated	
2013	2nd Annual DramaFever Awards	Best Couple Not Meant to Be	Honoka Yahagi; Yuki Yamada	Nominated	
2015	3rd Annual DramaFever Awards	Best Couple	Honoka Yahagi; Yuki Furukawa	Won	
