= Suzuki Sensei =

Japanese manga series

- Cover of the first manga volume

鈴木先生
- Manga
- Written by: Kenzi Taketomi
- Published by: Futabasha
- Magazine: Manga Action
- Original run: 2005 – January 2011
- Volumes: 11
- Television drama
- Original network: TV Tokyo
- Original run: April 2011 – June 2011
- Live-action film
- Directed by: Hayato Kawai
- Written by: Ryota Kosawa
- Released: January 12, 2013

Suzuki Sensei (鈴木先生) is a Japanese manga series written and illustrated by Kenzi Taketomi. It was adapted into a Japanese television drama series in 2011 and into a film that premiered on 12 January 2013.

== Cast ==
- Hiroki Hasegawa
- Asami Usuda
- Tomoko Tabata
