= Honoka Yahagi =

Japanese actress and model (born 1997)

- 矢作穂香
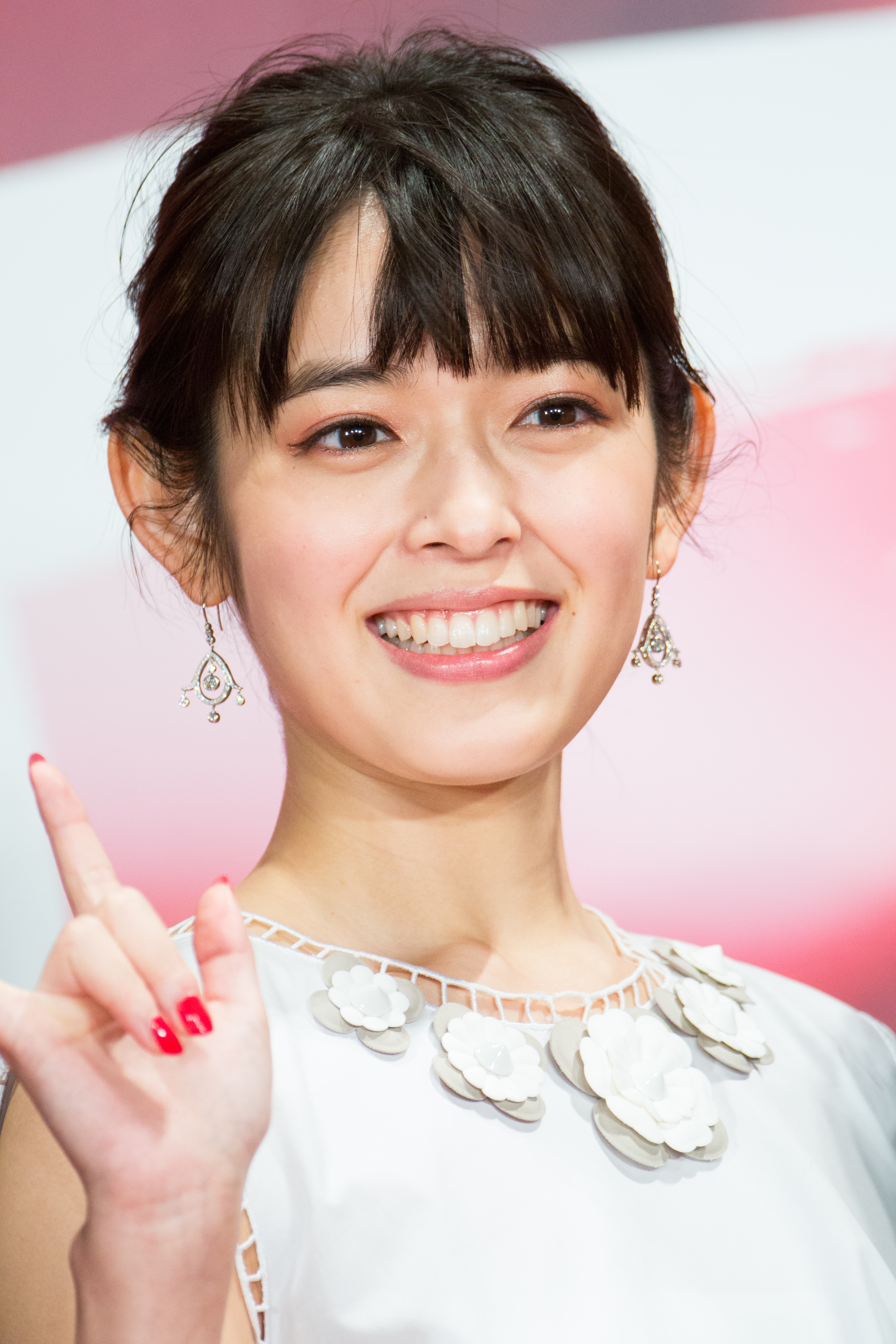
- Yahagi at the Tokyo International Film Festival in 2017
- Born: March 7, 1997 (age 29); Chiba Prefecture, Japan
- Other name: Honoka Miki
- Occupations: Actress; model
- Years active: 2010–present
- Agent: Ken-On
- Known for: Kamen Rider OOO; Mischievous Kiss: Love in Tokyo
- Spouse: Unknown (m. 2026)
- Website: ameblo.jp/honoka19737

Honoka Yahagi (Japanese: 矢作 穂香, Hepburn: Yahagi Honoka; born March 7, 1997), formerly known as Honoka Miki (未来 穂香, Miki Honoka), is a Japanese actress, fashion model and voice actress. Yahagi is best known for her role as Kotoko Aihara in Mischievous Kiss: Love in Tokyo and its sequel Mischievous Kiss 2: Love in Okinawa as Kotoko Irie. She is also known for portraying Mezool (Human State) in the tokusatsu series Kamen Rider OOO.

== Early life and career ==
Yahagi was born on 7 March 1997 in Chiba Prefecture, Japan. She has an elder brother and sister. Yahagi was first scouted while visiting Disneyland with her family in 2008. In April 2009, Yahagi began working as an exclusive model for teen fashion magazine Love Berry. Yahagi's special skills include classical ballet and her favorite musical group are NEWS and TVXQ.

In 2016, Yahagi changed her artist name from Honoka Miki to her birth name Honoka Yahagi because she wanted to honor the name she received from her parents.

== Personal life ==
On May 1, 2026, Yahagi announced her marriage through her personal Instagram account. The name of her spouse was not disclosed.

== Filmography ==
=== TV series ===
| Year | Title | Role | Notes | Ref. |
|---|---|---|---|---|
| 2010 | Kamen Rider OOO | Mezool | Human State | |
| 2010 | Clone Baby | Kanako Aoyagi | | |
| 2011 | Suzuki Sensei | Kana Nakamura | Student, Class 2-A | |
| 2011 | Asu no Hikari o Tsukame 2 | Yuka Kagami | | |
| 2012 | Toshi Densetsu no Onna | Rin Ishibashi | Guest, Season 1: Episode 7 | |
| 2012 | Kuro no Onna Kyoshi | Natsumi Sudo | Guest, Episode 1 | |
| 2013 | Mischievous Kiss: Love in Tokyo | Kotoko Aihara | | |
| 2013 | Tenma san ga Yuku | | Guest, Season 1: Episode 6 | |
| 2013 | Kasuka na Kanojo | Kana Okamoto | Student, Class 3-2 | |
| 2014 | Bokura wa Minna Shindeiru | Akane Yoshino | | |
| 2014 | Mischievous Kiss 2: Love in Tokyo | Kotoko Irie | | |
| 2017 | Kizoku Tantei | Maki Gudo | Guest ep.10-11 | |
| 2017 | Important Witness private detective" (Juyo Sankounin Tantei) | Luna Azuma | Guest ep.4 | |
| 2018 | Seigi no Se | Maria Machida | Guest ep.2 | |
| 2018 | Hoping to Give You a Big Hug Tonight | Riko Saeki | | |
| 2018 | Bokura wa Kiseki de Dekite Iru | Kotone Aoyama | | |
| 2019 | Secret Unrequited Love | Yurino Tamura | | |
| 2019 | Kaseifu no Mitazono 3 | Masako Genkaku | Guest ep.4 | |
| 2019 | Voice: 110 Emergency Control Room | Aoi Morishita | | |
| 2019 | Hey Sensei, Don't You Know? | Nanase Hoshino | | |
| 2020 | Peanut Butter Sandwich | Tsubaki Tachibana | | |
| 2020 | Oshaie Sommelier Oshako! | Oshako Jageger | | |
| 2020 | Ginza Kuroneko Monogatari | | | |
| 2022 | Servant | Aki Kitajima | | |
| 2022 | Smoke-filled Life | Kaoru Sayama | | |
| 2022 | Short Program | Nao Tanimura | Episode: "Spring Call" | |
| 2022 | Popular Indie Creator Nekoyashiki is Making His Yearning for Approval Worse | Koharu Yamada | | |
| 2022 | Tepachi | Aoi | Episode 10 | |
| 2023 | Hitomonchaku Nara Yorokonde | Hitomi Mamoru | Lead role | |
| 2023 | Something's Wrong 2 | Saku Minegishi | Episode 7 | |

=== Film ===
| Year | Title | Role | Notes | Ref |
|---|---|---|---|---|
| 2010 | Maria-sama ga Miteru | Yumi Fukuzawa | | |
| 2010 | Neck | Yukari | Ghost, Sugina's friend | |
| 2011 | Kamen Rider OOO Wonderful: The Shogun and the 21 Core Medals | Mezool | Human State | |
| 2012 | The Chasing World 4 | Yui | | |
| 2012 | The Chasing World 5 | Yui | | |
| 2013 | Suzuki Sensei Movie | Kana Nakamura | Student, Class 2-A | |
| 2013 | The Crone | Ayane | | |
| 2013 | Enoshima Prism | Kyōko | | |
| 2014 | Hokago Lost | Yuki | Episode 1: Little Trip | |
| 2014 | Finding Adolescence | Hasumi Takane | | |
| 2015 | Tunnel of Love: The Place For Miracles | Hitoha | | |
| 2017 | Hanagatami | Mina Ema | | |
| 2019 | Go Away, Ultramarine | | | |

== Awards and nominations ==
| Year | Award | Category | Work | Result | Ref. |
|---|---|---|---|---|---|
| 2013 | 2nd Annual DramaFever Awards | Best Couple (with Yuki Furukawa) | ItaKiss: Love in Tokyo | Nominated | |
| 2013 | 2nd Annual DramaFever Awards | Best Couple Not Meant to Be (with Yuki Yamada) | ItaKiss: Love in Tokyo | Nominated | |
| 2015 | 3rd Annual DramaFever Awards | Best Couple (with Yuki Furukawa) | ItaKiss 2: Love in Tokyo | Won | |
