= Tomoya Ishii =

Japanese alpine skier (born 1989)

Tomoya Ishii 石井 智也
Personal information
- Born: 23 May 1989 (age 37) Utashinai, Hokkaidō, Japan
- Height: 173 cm (5 ft 8 in) (2018)

Skiing career
- Sport: Alpine skiing ♂
- Club: Goldwin Ski Club
- Disciplines: Giant slalom, slalom

Olympics
- Teams: 1 – (2018)

Tomoya Ishii (石井 智也, Ishii Tomoya) is a Japanese alpine skier who competed for Japan at the 2018 Winter Olympics.

== Early life ==
Ishii was born on 23 May 1989 in Utashinai, Hokkaidō, Japan. He first skied at age 2 and took alpine skiing seriously during his first year of primary school in Utashinai. He studied at the Tokai University in Tokyo

== Career ==
Tomoya Ishii is part of Goldwin Ski Club a skiing organization based in Japan. In 2014 he moved to Austria to focus on his training as well as to compete in Europe. He trains under national coach Yasuyuki Takishita. He made his Olympic debut at the grand slalom event of the 2018 Winter Olympics on 18 February. He had a total time of 2:24.78 in two runs and placed 30th. In the first run he placed 35th. He is the best placed skier representing an Asian country.
