= Yōji Tanaka =

Japanese actor

- 田中 要次
- Born: August 8, 1963 (age 63); Kiso, Nagano, Japan
- Status: Married
- Other name: BoBA
- Occupations: Actor, tarento
- Years active: 1990-present

Yōji Tanaka (田中 要次, Yōji Tanaka; born 8 August 1963) is a Japanese actor and tarento. He is often credited as BoBA.

== Career ==
Born in Kiso, Nagano, Tanaka first began working for Japan National Railways after high school, but often went to the movies, including shows of indie and self-produced films. Becoming friends with young directors like Naoto Yamakawa, he left his job in 1990 and went to Tokyo, where he began working as an extra or lighting assistant on films by Naoto Takenaka, Junji Sakamoto, and others. After 1994 he concentrated on acting, eventually achieving fame in dramas like Hero. His first television show in a starring role, Outdoor Rock'n Roll, started broadcasting on BS Asahi in 2014.

== Filmography ==
=== Film ===
- Kanemasa (2020)
- The Grapes of Joy (2021)
- Your Turn to Kill: The Movie (2021)
- Ring Wandering (2022)
- What to Do with the Dead Kaiju? (2022), the Chief of Staff, Joint Staff
- The Broken Commandment (2022)
- Sun and Bolero (2022), Masamichi Endo
- Haw (2022)
- Thousand and One Nights (2022)
- The Dry Spell (2023), Hosokawa
- Detective of Joshidaikoji (2023)
- The Silent Service (2023)
- The Pearl Legacy (2023)
- Jigen Daisuke (2023)
- Dare to Stop Us 2 (2024)
- Demon Virus (2025)
- Kaiju Guy! (2025)
- Let's Meet at Angie's Bar (2025)
- See You Again (2025)
- Bullet Train Explosion (2025)
- Okaeri no Yu (2026)

=== Television ===
- Hero (2001)
- Part-Time Detective (2002) as Oshita
- Mischievous Kiss: Love in Tokyo (2013 - 2015)
- Reach Beyond the Blue Sky (2021) as Hagiwara Shirobei
- A Day-Off of Ryunosuke Kamiki (2022)
- The Silent Service (2024)
- The Tiger and Her Wings (2024) as Sasayama
- Brothers in Arms (2026) as Ryoun
