= Joe Cheng =

Taiwanese actor, model, and singer

Joseph Cheng
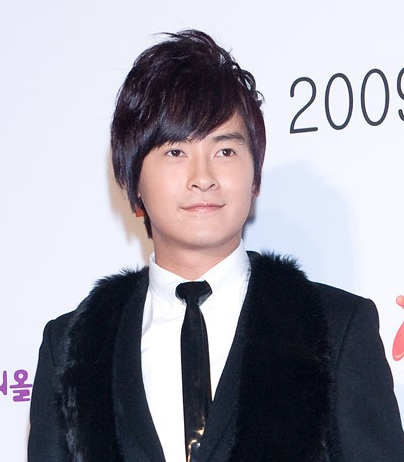
- Cheng in 2009
- Born: 19 June 1982 (age 43); Beitun, Taichung, Taiwan
- Occupations: Model; actor; singer
- Years active: 2003–present

Chinese name
- Traditional Chinese: 鄭元暢
- Simplified Chinese: 郑元畅
Transcriptions
Standard Mandarin
- Hanyu Pinyin: Zhèng Yuánchàng
- Musical career
- Also known as: Bryan Cheng
- Origin: Republic of China (Taiwan)
- Genres: Mandopop
- Label: Avex Taiwan (2009–present)
- Website: joesfamily.com.tw

Joseph Cheng (traditional Chinese: 鄭元暢; simplified Chinese: 郑元畅; pinyin: Zhèng Yuánchàng, born 19 June 1982) is a Taiwanese model, actor and singer. Although he started his career as a model, Cheng is well known for his role as Jiang Zhishu in Taiwanese drama serial version of Japanese manga Itazura Na Kiss, It Started with a Kiss. Cheng has gained much recognition as an actor in most parts of Asia, particularly Taiwan, China, Hong Kong, Singapore, Philippines and Japan. Cheng released his debut EP, Sing a Song, in October 2009.

== Early life ==
Joe Cheng, who was previously (prior to 2005) known as Bryan Cheng, grew up in Beitun District, Taichung, Taiwan. Since his parents' divorce when he was in primary school, he has lived with his father. He also has an elder sister, who lives with their mother.

== Acting career ==
Cheng began his career in the entertainment industry with Catwalk Modelling Agency. He reportedly achieved success as a model within one year of signing. Cheng is based in Taiwan and also counts China, Hong Kong, and Japan as his main target markets.

As a model, Cheng was featured in several music videos, including one of Heavenly King Jacky Cheung's. In 2003, he took on the role of the second male lead in The Rose, a Taiwanese drama serial which also starred Taiwanese girl band S.H.E and renowned actress Cecilia Yip. It was this role that kick-started his acting career. Following his rising popularity and the success of his first acting role, Cheng was asked to make a guest appearance as Lucifer in Taiwanese boyband Energy's first-ever idol drama, Dance with Michael, in the same year. Cheng starred as the main lead in two dramas, Nine-ball and Magic Ring in 2004. Although these two serials achieved lukewarm success, Cheng took the role of the main lead in It Started with a Kiss in the following year. This serial achieved high ratings in Taiwan and was popular with audiences throughout Asia. Cheng's popularity rose tremendously as a result. It Started with a Kiss was also Cheng's first collaboration with actress Ariel Lin. The two, who are often touted as one of Taiwan's most compatible on-screen couples, paired up again in the 2007 sequel to It Started with a Kiss, They Kiss Again; as well as Love or Bread (2008) which is unrelated to the Kiss series. Cheng has starred in numerous drama serials produced in Taiwan, China, and Japan, but remains most well known for his roles in The Rose and the Kiss series.

As a model, Cheng has modelled for several big-name brands including Puma AG (2003–2005) and adidas (2006–present). He has starred in numerous runway shows for brands such as Marc Jacob's (2003), Timberland, Levi's and Christian Dior (2007) He often also appears at flagship store openings including Hugo Boss (2009). Cheng also endorses several food, jewellery and clothing brands; the most recent being Chinese green tea brand Kang Shifu (for which Cheng starred and recorded a song with Mike He and Taiwanese actress Joe Chen) as well as casual wear brand N+a (with Taiwanese singer-actress Cyndi Wang). He also worked as a spokesperson for Shiatzy Chen.

Excluding drama serial memorabilia, Cheng has released three pictorial books in addition to four calendars and one mini pictorial in conjunction with the release of his EP in 2009. He has also authored two books and co-authored another on his hometown Taichung. He was also featured in a 2006 book on Catwalk Modelling Agency. Cheng has won multiple awards as a model and as a performing artiste. The most notable include one at the Asia Model Festival Awards 2009, in which he won the Asia Special Award. Cheng, together with Sylvia Chang and Mike He, was appointed as an ambassador for World Vision in December 2009.

== Music career ==
2009 was a quiet year for the television star, who spent the year busy with his theatre debut, Design for Living, starring opposite stage veterans Sylvia Chang and David Wang, under the directorship of Hong Kong stage director Edward Lam. The troupe made several sell-out shows in Hong Kong, China, Taiwan and Singapore. Cheng said that it has always been one of his goals to star in a stage play and was very honoured to have been able to star in the same production as Sylvia Chang. In the same year, he released his first EP, Sing a Song. Cheng is known by his friends in the industry as one who loves to sing. Album sales were fair and the EP topped certain charts in Taiwan but Cheng failed to convince music critics of the industry. Much to the dismay of his fans, Cheng did not star in any drama series in 2009.

In addition to his entertainment career, Cheng is completing his part-time university studies in tourism management at Hsing Wu College. As all males in Taiwan have to enlist for National Service, Cheng is due to enlist as soon as he completes his education. In 2010, Cheng represented Taiwan and performed at the 7th Asia Song Festival, organised by Korea Foundation for International Culture Exchange, at the Seoul Olympic Stadium.

== Personal life ==
=== Military service ===
Cheng is now discharged from military service in the second regiment of the Taiwan Coast Guard.

== Filmography ==
=== Films ===
- What on Earth Have I Done Wrong?! (2007)
- Ripples of Desire (2012)
- Time Archive (2012)
- The Queens (2015)
- The Beloved (2015)

=== Television series ===
| Year | Chinese Title | English Title | Role |
|---|---|---|---|
| 2003 | 蔷薇之戀 | The Rose | Han Kui (韓葵) |
| 2003 | 米迦勒之舞 | Dance With Michael | Lu Xi Fu / Lucifer |
| 2004 | 愛情魔戒 | Magic Ring | Du Jing Hang (杜競航) |
| 2005 | 撞球小子 | Nine-Ball | Kuai Da |
| 2005 | 惡作劇之吻 | It Started with a Kiss | Jiang Zhi Shu (江直樹) [Irie Naoki] Michael |
| 2006 | 第一桶金 | Di Yi Tong Jin | Ah Sheng |
| 2006 | 庚子風雲 | War and Destiny | Chen Ran |
| 2007 | 熱情仲夏 | Summer x Summer | Ouyang Lei (歐陽累) |
| 2007 | 惡作劇2吻 | They Kiss Again | Jiang Zhi Shu (江直樹) [Irie Naoki] Michael |
| 2008 | 蜂蜜幸運草 | Honey and Clover | Den Zhen Shan (鄧真山) [Mayama Takumi] |
| 2008 | 我的億萬麵包 | Love or Bread | Cai Jing Lai (蔡進來) / Frank |
| 2010 | 欢迎爱光临 | That Love Comes | Xia Tian (夏天) |
| 2010 | 國民英雄 | Channel-X | An Zai Yong (安在勇) |
| 2012 | 愛的蜜方 | Love Actually | Hao Feng |
| 2014 | 你照亮我星球 | You Light Up My Star | Liu Cheng Wei (劉城偉) |
| 2015 | 只因單身在一起 | Singles Villa | Qiao Sheng Yu |
| 2016 | 仙劍雲之凡 | Chinese Paladin 5 | Long You |
| 2017 | 天泪传奇之凤凰无双 | Legend of Heavenly Tear: Phoenix Warriors | Xiao Fengqing |
| 2018 | 合伙人 | Partners | Huo Zhiyuan |
| 2019 | 爵迹·临界天下 | L.O.R.D. Critical World | Yin Chen |
| 2019 | 半生緣 | Eighteen Springs | Shen Shijun |
| 2021 | 華燈初上 | Light the Night | Wu Shao-chiang |
| 2021 | 无神之地不下雨 | Rainless Love in a Godless Land | Fali |
| 2023 | 不良執念清除師 | Oh No! Here Comes Trouble | Yu Zhen Yuan (余鎮元) |
| 2023 | 有生之年 | Living | Gao Jia Yang |

=== Variety shows ===
| Year | English title | Mandarin Title | Notes |
|---|---|---|---|
| 2021 | Ace Actress | 我是女演员 | |
| 2017 | The Amazing Race China 4 | 極速前進中國版4 | With Wang Likun |
| 2017 | Challenger League | 挑战者联盟 | Guest |
| 2016 | Race the World | 非凡搭檔 | |
| 2015 | Real Hero | 真心英雄 | |

=== Awards and nominations ===
| Year | Awards | Category | Nominated work | Result |
|---|---|---|---|---|
| 2004 | China Fashion Awards | New Figure | None | Won |
| 2007 | Enlight Entertainment Awards | New Fashion Artist | None | Won |
| 2009 | Hong Kong Yahoo Popular Search Awards | Hong Kong Most Popular Taiwanese Artist | They Kiss Again | Won |
| 2009 | Hong Kong Yahoo Popular Search Awards | International Male Actor | They Kiss Again | Won |
| 2009 | Enlight Entertainment Awards | Most Influential Fashion Actor | | Won |
| 2009 | New Artist Awards | Best All-Around Artist | | Won |
| 2010 | China Original Music Chart | Favorite Idol | Sing a Song | Won |
| 2010 | China Original Music Chart | Outstanding New Singer | Sing a Song | Won |
| 2014 | Seoul International Drama Awards | People's Choice: Popular Actor | Love Actually | Won |
| 2016 | The Best Fashion Visionaries Award | Ten Best Dressed Personalities | | Won |
| 2016 | 2016 Mobile Video Festival | Fashion Pioneer | | Won |
| 2024 | 59th Golden Bell Award | Best Male Supporting Actor | 有生之年 Living - Gao Jia Yang | Won |

=== Music video appearances ===
- 2003 – "葉子" (Leaf) – The Rose OST by A-Sun
- "Bu Chao Bu Nao" (不吵不鬧)- Landy 溫嵐
- "Ji Ta Shou" (吉他手)- 陳綺貞
- "Gift" – Jacky Cheung
- "Ye Zi/Leaf" (叶子) – A Sun
- "E Zuo Ju" (恶作剧) (It Started with a Kiss OST) – Wang Lan Yin

=== Music videos ===
- "Bu Si Xin/Unwilling to Give Up" (不死心) – Joe Cheng
- "Chang Yi Shou Ge/Sing a Song" (唱一首歌)- Joe Cheng

== Discography ==
| Album Info | Track listing |
|---|---|
| Sing a Song Chang Yi Shou Ge (暢一首歌): Format: Extended Play (EP); Released: 2 October 2009 | 1. "不死心" (Unwilling to Give Up); 2. "王子復仇記" (Prince's Revenge Record); 3. "暢一首歌" (Chang Yi Shou Ge); 4. "彩色 Party" (Colorful Party); 5. "麵包的滋味" (The Taste of Bread); 6. "My Song, Your Sun" |

== Bibliography ==
- Yuan Wei Chang Kuai《元味暢快》(2005)
- Always Smile《籃球偶像事件簿》(2003)
- My Color My Style《我型我色——鄭元暢配色寶典》(2003)
