= Yuki Furukawa =

Japanese actor

- 古川 雄輝
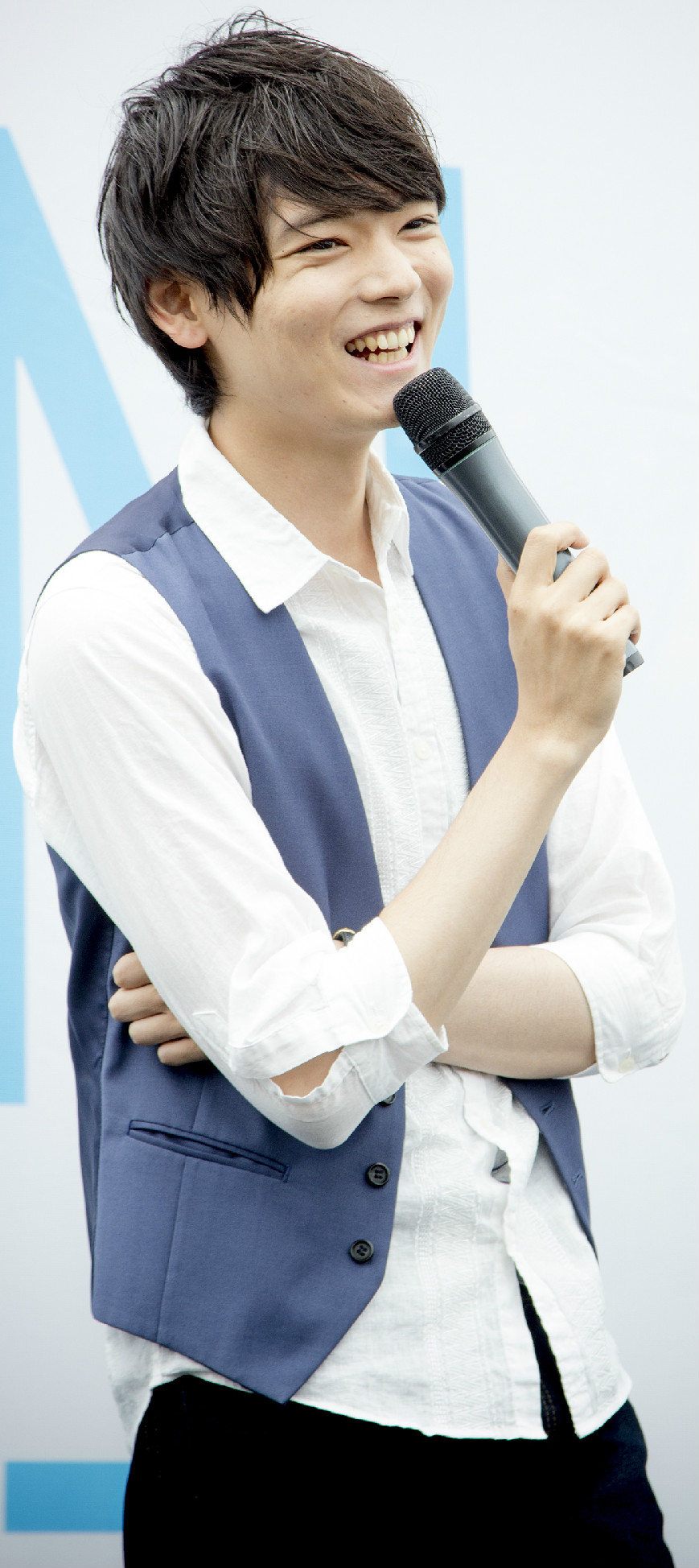
- Furukawa at the J-POP Summit Festival 2014 in San Francisco, California
- Born: December 18, 1987 (age 38); Tokyo, Japan
- Other name: Furupon (ふるぽん)
- Education: Keio University
- Occupation: Actor
- Years active: 2010–present
- Spouse: Unknown (m. 2019)
- Children: 1

Yuki Furukawa (古川 雄輝, Furukawa Yūki; born 18 December 1987) is a Japanese actor. He gained popularity as Naoki Irie in the 2013 J-Drama Mischievous Kiss: Love in Tokyo.

== Personal life ==
Furukawa was born on December 18, 1987, in Tokyo. He and his family moved to Canada when he was seven years old. He moved to the United States at the age of 16 during his high school years and returned to Japan to study Engineering at Keio University. In June 2019, he announced that he got married and was expecting his first child. In October 2019, Furukawa and his wife announced the birth of their first child, a daughter, via his agency and his Twitter.

In April 2024, Furukawa announced on his Instagram that he left Horipro and became freelance actor.

== Career ==
Furukawa is known for his 2013 breakthrough role in the Japanese television drama Mischievous Kiss: Love in Tokyo in which he played the lead role Naoki Irie. He presented a new image of the classical manga role of Irie Naoki, and starred opposite Honoka Yahagi who played his love interest. Within two months of joining Weibo, the Chinese equivalent of Twitter, the number of his followers increased to more than 500,000. Due to his popularity in China, he starred in the Fuji TV/iQiyi web-drama Mysterious Summer which was the first drama series co-produced by Japan and China. The series was viewed more than 60 million times on Chinese online video platform iQiyi and was distributed online in more than 35 countries worldwide.

He is the first Japanese actor to have had a fan meeting in Shanghai, China on July 21, 2013.

== Filmography ==
=== Television ===
Year	Title	Role	Notes	Ref.
2012	Rich Man, Poor Woman	Tomoki Kuga		
2013	Yae's Sakura	Hiromichi Kozaki	Taiga drama	
2013–14	Mischievous Kiss: Love in Tokyo	Naoki Irie	2 seasons	
2015	5→9 From Five to Nine	Mishima Satoshi		
2017	Erased	Satoru Fujinuma	Lead role	
2017	Beppinsan	Kentaro Murata	Asadora	
2020	Line no Kotae Awase: Otome to kanchigai	Yasui Tsukasa	Lead role	
2020	People Who Don't Work	Keita Nitta		
2020	O Maidens in Your Savage Season	Tomoaki Yamagishi		
2022	Kami-sama no Ekohiiki	Kami-sama		
2024	Golden Kamuy: The Hunt of Prisoners in Hokkaido	Yasaku Edogai	Episode 6	
2025–26	Kamen Rider ZEZTZ	Nox / Kensei Odaka / NOX Knight / Kamen Rider NOX	Tokusatsu	

=== Film ===
Year	Title	Role	Notes	Ref.
2011	High School Debut	Yui Asaoka		
2013	Beyond the Memories	Kiyomasa Komine		
2015	Poison Berry in My Brain	Ryoichi Saotome		
2018	Colours of Wind	Ryo / Ryu	Lead role	
2018	My Little Monster	Yuzan Yoshida		
2019	Murders at the House of Death	Haruya Tatsunami		
2020	Restart After Coming Back Home	Mitsuomi Kozuka	Lead role	
2020	Love Me, Love Me Not	Sōta Inui		

=== Music video ===
Year	Song	Artist	Notes	Ref.
2016	Heaven's Door: Hi no Ataru Basho	Chise Kanna		
