= Leshi Zhixin =

Chinese television manufacturer

Leshi Zhixin Electronic Technology (Tianjin)
- Trade name: LeTV Zhixin
- Type: Subsidiary
- Founded: 7 February 2012
- Headquarters: Tianjin, China
- Key people: Jia Yueting
- Net income: ▼ (CN¥730.6 million) (2015)
- Total equity: (CN¥238.0 million) (mid-2016)
Owner
Le.com	(39.3670%)
Sunac China	(32.7109%)
Leshi Holding	(17.9497%)
LeRan Investment	(3.9486%)
Truly International	(2.6667%)
Xinle Asset	(1.9313%)
Huaxia Insurance	(1.1045%)
Beimeihong Tech.	(0.6442%)
- Parent: Le.com
- Subsidiaries: LeTV Zhixin HK (100%)
- Footnotes; 2016 figures unaudited

Chinese name
- Simplified Chinese: 乐视致新电子科技（天津）有限公司
Transcriptions

Alternative Chinese name
- Simplified Chinese: 乐视致新
Transcriptions

Leshi Zhixin Electronic Technology (Tianjin) Co., Ltd. (also known as LeTV Zhixin) is a Chinese television manufacturer which was a subsidiary of Le.com (aka LeTV). In 2017 Sunac China bought a part of Leshi Zhixin's stake, as well as subscription of new shares. Other new investors of the company were Huaxia Life Insurance (1.1310%) and a private equity fund LeRan Investment.

The company produced TV that branded "Leshi SuperTV".

== History ==
=== 2016 ===
In late 2015, it was announced that Leshi Zhixin would bought the new shares of TCL Multimedia for HK$2.27 billion (HK$6.5 per share), a subsidiary of TCL Corporation. On 11 May 2016, the deal was completed, which Leshi Zhixin holds the stake via Hong Kong incorporated subsidiary Letv ZhiXin Investment (HK) Limited.

=== 2017 ===
On 13 January 2017 Sunac China (via Tianjin Jiarui Huixi (Chinese: 天津嘉睿汇鑫企业管理), a subsidiary of Tianjin Yingrui Huixi (Chinese: 天津盈瑞汇鑫企业管理), which Sunac China had a contract with Tianjin Yingrui Huixi that Sunac China used Tianjin Yingrui Huixi as a proxy to invest in China in order to bypass the law on restriction on foreign investment) acquired part of the stake of Leshi Zhixin from Le.com and a minority shareholder, private equity fund Xinle Asset Management Tianjin (Chinese: 鑫乐资产管理(天津), a fund for employee ownership), for CN¥2.302 billion and CN¥2.648 billion respectively. After the transaction, Leshi Zhixin would issue 10% new shares to Tianjin Jiarui for an additional CN¥3 billion (share capital and share premium combined). After the deals, Le.com would still be the largest shareholder but for 40.3118% only, it was followed by Tianjin Jiarui for 33.4959% and Leshi Holding Beijing for 18.3805%; Xinle would owned just 1.9777% as the fifth largest shareholder, as well as 5.86% would be owned by the others, including two new investors: private equity fund Ningbo Hangzhou Bay New District LeRan Investment Management (Chinese: 宁波杭州湾新区乐然投资管理) (Note: Le.com declared that LeRan was controlled by Jia Yueting himself. However, according to National Enterprise Credit Information Publicity System, Jia Yueting was the owner of the general partner and manager of LeRan Investment only (for 0.14% via an intermediate subsidiary owned by Leshi Holding Beijing), as well as an additional 14.27% stake owned by Leshi Holding Beijing; state-owned enterprises Yingda Capital Management and Linfen Investment Group, in fact owned 57.06% and 28.53% stake of LeRan Investment respectively as limited partner, since July 2016.) for 4.0434% stake and Hua Insurance for 1.1310% stake. LeRan Investment and Hua Insurance bought the stakes for CN¥1.43 billion and CN¥400 million respectively. As part of the deal, Tianjin Jiarui has rights to nominate one out of three directors of Leshi Zhixin.

In February 2017 Le.com formed an agreement with a supplier Truly International Holdings (SEHK: 732) for capital increase. Truly would own 2.3438% stake in Leshi Zhixin for CN¥720 million. However, after a legal mediation the new agreement was for Truly to own 2.6667% at the initial partial investment amount of RMB240 million.

In December 2017, the company was renamed to Xīn Lèshì Zhìjiā (Chinese: 新乐视智家电子科技（天津）有限公司; lit. 'New Leshi Smart Home Electronic Technology (Tianjin) Co.', 'Ltd.').

According to National Enterprise Credit Information Publicity System, as of 20 December 2016, Leshi Holding Beijing, a private company owned by the chairman of Le.com, had pledged all their Leshi Zhixin stake to China Minsheng Trust.

== Equity investments ==
- TCL Multimedia (20.09%)
