= LeEco =

Chinese company founded by Jia Yueting, the founder of Le.com

Leshi Holding 乐视控股
- Trade name: LeEco
- Type: Private
- Industry: Conglomerate
- Founded: 8 September 2011; 14 years ago
- Founder: Jia Yueting
- Defunct: 2017; 9 years ago
- Fate: Bankrupt
- Headquarters: Beijing, China
- Area served: Worldwide (China, India, United States and Russia mainly)
- Products: Automobiles, bicycles, mobile phones, televisions, film productions, virtual reality
- Brands: LeMall.com, EcoPass
- Subsidiaries: Le Vision Pictures (28.38%); Le Vision Entertainment; LeMusic; LeMobile; LeMall

LeEco (Chinese: 乐视集团) is a Chinese conglomerate founded by Jia Yueting, the founder of Le.com (formerly LeTV). The group maintains businesses in video streaming, cloud services, software development, consumer electronics, such as smartphones, smart TVs, VR, electric bicycles, electric cars, film production and distribution, real estate, wine, retail, eCommerce, and other business. LeEco has expanded to countries outside of China, such as the United States, India, and Russia.

From late 2016 onward, LeEco experienced financial limitations due to aggressive strategic expansion and difficulties in acquiring new funds. As of September 2018, LeEco has sold its remaining ownership of Leshi Zhixin Electronic Technology Co., Ltd. and Le Vision Pictures to Sunac. In October 2018, Le.com formally announced it is not for sale and is exploring solutions to address its financial issues.

== History ==
The predecessor of the diversified group, Letv (Chinese: 乐视视频; pinyin: lèshì shìpín; lit. 'Leshi Video'), was founded by Jia Yueting in Beijing in 2004 and was the first streaming video company in China to go public. Jia later founded Leshi Holding Beijing as a sister company of Letv to provide media content and products linked to its services, and use LeEco (Chinese: 乐视生态; pinyin: lèshì shēngtài; lit. 'Leshi Ecosystem') as the brand.

The Chinese company launched its video streaming service three years before Netflix—and it had started producing its own original content well before the arrival of the seminal Netflix series House of Cards.

In 2014, LeEco aggregate sales amounted to approximately US$1.6 billion. At the end of 2014, LeEco announced its Super Electric Ecosystem (SEE) Project — the company's first foray into automobiles.

In 2014, Le Vision Pictures, a subsidiary of LeEco, opened an office in West Los Angeles to build closer ties with filmmakers and to expand other lines of business, including eCommerce, large-screen TVs, smartphones, and electric cars.

In April 2015, Letv established its first US headquarters in Redwood City to build up its presence in Silicon Valley, and it announced opening another office in Los Angeles in the near future.

In 2015, LeEco introduced three models of its first-generation smartphone, the Le Superphone, in China. LeEco sold over 1 million Le Superphones within three months, and its online sales have topped Apple and Samsung in China. LeEco was also the first smartphone manufacturer to release its bill of materials worldwide.

In January 2016, both Letv services and electronics products that were previously marketed internationally under the Letv name were re-labeled under LeEco, when media services began under Le.com.

In February 2016, LeEco unofficially opened a new office in San Jose and began aggressively acquiring new talents from Silicon Valley's workforce.

In April, LeEco officially held a ribbon-cutting ceremony and press conference to formally establish its new, 80,000-square-foot North American headquarters in San Jose, which can hold up to 800 people. Chinese Consul General in San Francisco Luo Linquan, San Jose Mayor Sam Liccardo, and LeEco senior leadership spoke with the media and gave attendees a look into LeEco's full ecosystem of content, platforms, and, devices.

In May 2016, LeEco's San Jose office hit a headcount of about 300 and continued to acquire more talents. In the same month, staff from the Redwood City office moved to the San Jose office.

In July 2016, it was announced that LeEco would acquire American television manufacturer Vizio for $2 billion. Vizio was to be operated as an independent subsidiary in southern California, while Vizio's Inscape Data Services was going to be spun out into a privately held company.

On 19 October 2016, LeEco officially launched in the US at a debut event code-named "Big Bang" which was held in Innovation Hangar, San Francisco. The company unveiled its new flagship Le Pro 3, Le S3, and EcoTVs.

In November 2016, LeEco officially expanded into the US market, beginning sales of mobile phones, televisions, headphones, and eventually "smart bicycles" on its privately owned marketplace LeMall (Chinese: 乐视商城; pinyin: lèshì shāngchéng).

On 6 November 2016, CEO Jia Yuetin sent an internal letter to employees in hopes to make transparency and calming rumors, stating "We blindly sped ahead, and our cash demand ballooned. We got over-extended in our global strategy. At the same time, our capital and resources were in fact limited." He plans to invest US$10 million and reduce his base salary to US$0.15 in order to allow the company to expand into the United States. These issues within the company included cutting 10% of its workforce and considering selling non-core business units such as LeSEE and real estate ventures.

On 23 November 2016, Compal Electronics confirmed that LeEco failed to pay a debt of NT$ 4.25 billion, which was rescheduled and paid in time.

In late November 2016, a town hall meeting was held at the Silicon Valley headquarters with executives addressing concerns in response to its recent negative press coverage and company status. Executives told employees that the media was misreporting the story and that this was just "YT being YT". Employees were assured that there will be no layoffs and were promised year-end bonuses and raises.

In late November 2016, LeEco announced a partnership with American telecommunications company AT&T to include its Internet-based cable TV streaming service DirecTV Now on LeEco "ecophones" and "ecotvs".

On 1 December 2016, LeEco started selling products in the United States through national retail chains Amazon.com, Target, and Best Buy, as well as continuing sales and after-sales support through its LeMall.com marketplace.

In early December 2016, layoffs were conducted in Hong Kong, India (80% of the workforce), and the US. At the time, the company did not want to attract media attention to US operations. Therefore, only India and Hong Kong layoffs were reported. However, multiple reports concluded that the first wave of layoffs in the US started as early as November 2016, with the recruiting team being the first to let go, following employees from different departments.

On 5 January 2017, Haosheng Electronic Technology (NEEQ: 838701) announced that they sued LeMobile for non-performing debts of CN¥11,020,393.22 and US$5,929,259.14 respectively.

On 13 January 2017, a 15% stake in Le Vision Pictures was agreed to be sold from Leshi Holding to Tianjin Jiarui, a subsidiary of Tianjin Yingrui Huixin (a company managed by Sunac China in order to bypass restrictions on foreign investments) for CN¥1.05 billion. In a separate deal, Tianjin Jiarui acquired the rights to nominate a member to the board of supervisors of LeMobile. LeEco's minority stake in the TV manufacturing subsidiary of Le.com (Leshi Zhixin) would also be diluted to 18.3805% due to the subscription of new shares by Tianjin Jiarui and other investors.

In April 2017, the company announced that it had scrapped its acquisition of Vizio, citing "regulatory headwinds", but that it would "continue to explore opportunities".

In 2017, The company went bankrupt restructuring in the United States to address billions of dollars in outstanding personal debts left over from the collapse of the Chinese conglomerate.

On 22 May 2017, an email sent to CNBC revealed an internal meeting in the Silicon Valley office to give an advance two-month notice to soon lay off more than 325 employees, 70% of the workforce. The company will now only occupy 1/4th of the office, sub-leasing out the remaining spaces for other potential companies.

In July 2017, Jia has fled his home country in China to work at Faraday Future in southern California after his assets were frozen by a Shanghai court. He has since visited Hong Kong for a short period of time in an attempt to receive funding from investors.

In July 2017, Jia stepped down, and LeEco's board appointed Sun Hongbin as the chairman, who has previously served as the chairman of Sunac.

In March 2018, LeEco's operations in Hong Kong were shut down, due to an order requested by the High Court in Hong Kong.

In July 2018, LeEco announced to rebrand of its Chinese name (Chinese: 乐融致新; pinyin: lèróng zhìxīn; lit. 'Joy and Harmony For The New Era'), as well as updating its logo sign at its Beijing Headquarters.

In August 2018, Le.com published various new job postings for hiring interns for 2019 at its Beijing Headquarters.

In September 2018, LeEco established a new subsidiary and successfully acquired new venture capital funds from Tencent and JD.com. In the same month, the company announced a strategic partnership to be working with JD.com, BroadLink, Qinglianyun, and Rokid in various strategic initiatives, such as cloud, IoT, smart hardware, cyber security, NPL, etc. In the same month, LeEco sold its remaining ownership of Leshi Zhixin Electronic Technology Co., Ltd. and Le Vision Pictures to Sunac.

As of October 2018, Le.com stills shows a full lineup of up-to-date videos in all major categories. Furthermore, Le.com has formally announced that it is not for sale. Its management is actively exploring solutions to address its financial issues.

== Subsidiaries and acquisitions ==
=== LeMusic ===
LeMusic (Chinese: 乐视音乐; pinyin: lèshì yīnyuè) was launched in 2015. Its CEO is Yin Liang (尹亮) and Lei Zhenjian serving as chairman.

=== LeMobile ===
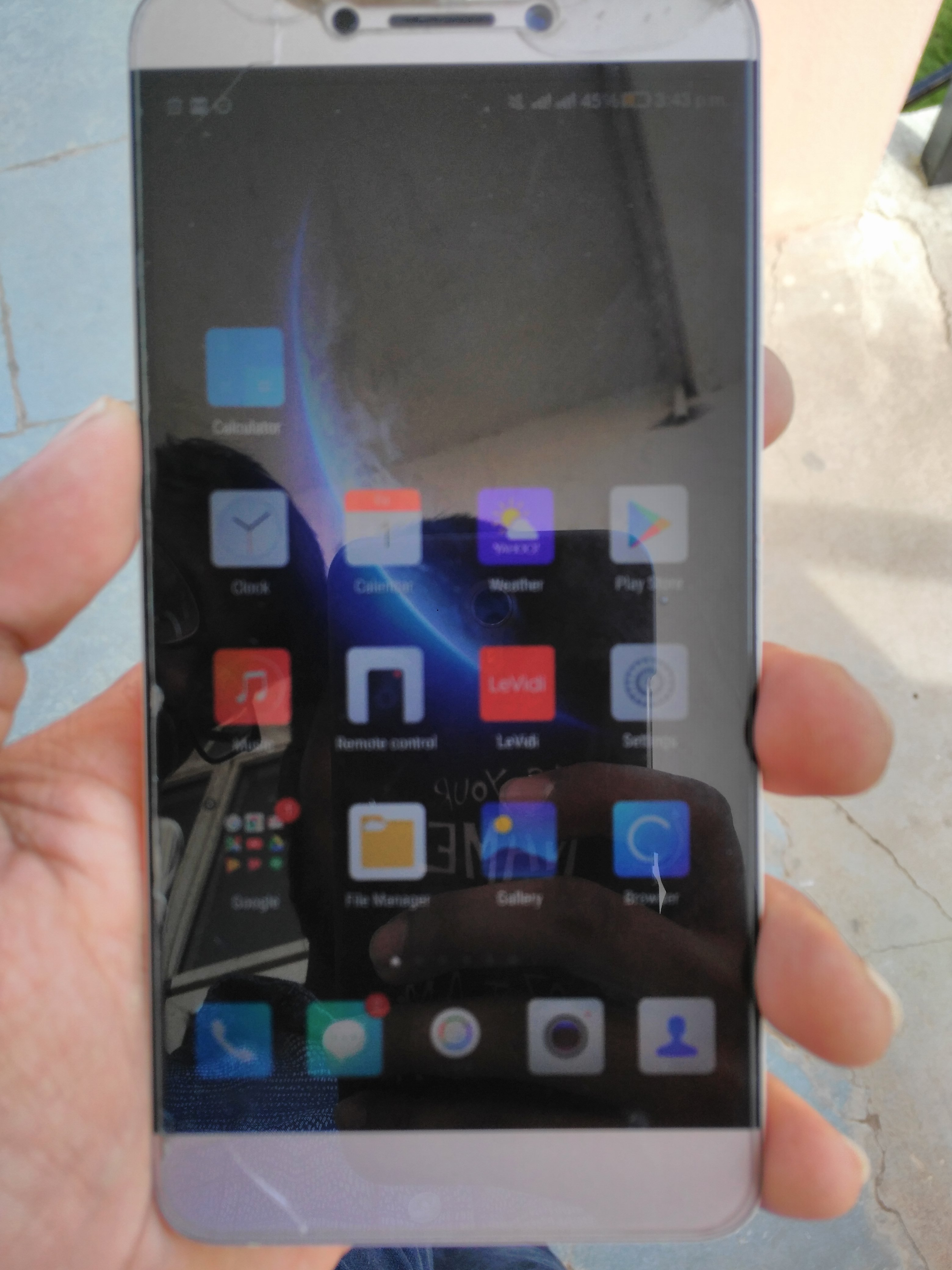
LeEco Le 1s model

LeMobile (Chinese: 乐视移动; pinyin: lèshì yídòng), a subsidiary of Leshi Holding, produces smartphones under the LeEco brand. Its most recent smartphones include the Le Pro 3 and Le S3.

List of LeEco Smartphones
Model	Code	Release date	Screen size	SoC	RAM	Headphone port
Le 1	X600		5.5"	Mediatek Helio X10	3 GB	3.5mm analog jack
Le 1s	X500 X501	2015.06	5.5"	Mediatek Helio X10	3 GB	3.5mm analog jack
Le 1 Pro	X800		5.5"	Qualcomm Snapdragon 810	4 GB	3.5mm analog jack
Le Max	X900		6.3"	Qualcomm Snapdragon 810	4 GB	3.5mm analog jack
Le Max Pro	X910	2016.01	6.3"	Qualcomm Snapdragon 820	4 GB	3.5mm analog jack
Le 2	X520	2016.04	5.5"	Qualcomm Snapdragon 652	3/4 GB	No (USB-C DAC only)
Le S3	X522	2016.10	5.5"	Qualcomm Snapdragon 652	3 GB	No (USB-C DAC only)
Le 2	X526	2016.10	5.5"	Qualcomm Snapdragon 652	3 GB	No (USB-C DAC only)
Cool1	C106		5.5"	Qualcomm Snapdragon 652	3 GB	3.5mm analog jack
Le 2	X620	2016.04	5.5"	MediaTek Helio X20	3 GB	No (USB-C DAC only)
Le 2 Pro	X625	2016.04	5.5"	MediaTek Helio X20	4 GB	No (USB-C DAC only)
Le Max 2	X820	2016.04	5.7"	Qualcomm Snapdragon 820	4/6GB	No (USB-C DAC only)
Le Pro 3	X722	2017.03	5.5"	Qualcomm Snapdragon 820	4 GB	No (USB-C DAC only)
Le Pro 3	X720	2016.09	5.5"	Qualcomm Snapdragon 820	4/6GB	No (USB-C DAC only)

=== LeSEE and Faraday Future ===
Leshi Holdings set up their electric vehicle branch in January 2015, LeSEE (Leshi Super Electric Car Company) and launched a concept model with Faraday Future at CES 2016. It also showed the Chinese-manufactured derivative at the 2016 Beijing Auto Show, the Le Supercar. The Le Car luxury vehicle with engineering talent from Lotus has also been shown. It also tried to lure in more talents in the field to develop their own products such as hiring Ni Kai (Chinese: 倪凯), who was the former director of Baidu's driverless car project. In April 2016, LeEco presented its very first model of its self-driving car named LeSEE (Super Electric Ecosystem) during a press conference in Beijing.

LeEco announced in the last week of December 2016 that they had broken ground for a US$3B (20B yuan) factory in Huzhou, Zhejiang. CarNewsChina reported that LeEco said the site will be 4,300 acres in size. LeEco plans to build a vehicle factory, a battery factory, and a traction motor factory. LeEco expects production rate to be around 200,000 cars a year at first, and then work up to a full capacity of 400,000 cars a year.

In August 2018, Faraday Future received US$854 million from Evergrande Health for a 45% stake in the company. In the same month, the company completed the first pre-production FF 91.

=== Film studios ===
LeEco is the owner of Le Vision Pictures. On 5 December 2015, it was announced that the film studio would be sold to Le.com. As of 8 November 2016, the deal was still in the phase of valuation.

In September 2016 the company announced the acquisition of Dichotomy Creative Group and the creation of Le Vision Entertainment, a US-based film studio.

As of May 2018, the company is still actively working on film development.

=== Le VR ===
Le VR (Chinese: 乐视虚拟现实; pinyin: lèshì xūnǐxiànshí) invests in virtual reality technology. The company was dissolved in the US due to financial constraints as of 2018.

== Sister companies ==
=== LeEco Global Holding ===
Jia Yueting also owned 28.83% shares of Hong Kong listed company Coolpad Group (as the largest shareholder and chairman of the board) via Cayman Islands-incorporated Lele Holding (and its subsidiary LeEco Global Holding), which had no parent-subsidiary relation with China-incorporated Leshi Holding (Beijing), the parent company of mainland China part of LeEco.

It was reported that LeEco Global Holding opened a call center in Russia in 2016.

=== Le.com ===
Leshi Holding (Beijing) owned 0.6% shares of Shenzhen listed company Le.com, which the largest shareholder was LeEco chairman Jia Yueting.

=== LeRan Investment Management ===
Ningbo Hangzhou Bay New District LeRan Investment Management, a private equity fund, was partially owned by Jia Yueting and Leshi Holding (who also owned the management company (general partner) of the fund). LeRan Investment Management was the shareholder of Leshi Zhixin for 3.9486% stake, which Leshi Holding (Beijing) owned 17.9497%.
