= Linfen Investment Group =

- Type: sovereign wealth fund
- Traded as: SSE: 124298 (bond)
- Industry: Utilities
- Founded: 17 January 2004
- Founder: Linfen Government; Party Committee of Linfen
- Headquarters: Linfen, China
- Area served: mainland China (mainly Linfen)
- Revenue: ▼CN¥1.428 billion (2015)
- Operating income: ▼ (CN¥436.7 million) (2015)
- Net income: ▲CN¥319.1 million (2015)
- Total assets: ▲CN¥34.165 billion (2015)
- Total equity: ▲CN¥13.641 billion (2015)
- Owner: Linfen Finance Bureau (100%)
- Website: lftzjt.com
- Footnotes in a consolidated basis

Linfen Investment Group Co., Ltd.
- Simplified Chinese: 临汾市投资集团有限公司
- Traditional Chinese: 臨汾市投資集團有限公司
Transcriptions

Linfen Investment Group Co., Ltd. is a Chinese sovereign wealth fund of Linfen Municipal Government, Shanxi Province. The company was the holding company of several utilities of the city.

In July 2016, Linfen Investment Group invested in a private equity fund based in Ningbo (Chinese: 宁波杭州湾新区乐然投资管理) for 28.53% stake, which in turn the fund owned 4.0434% stake of Leshi Zhixin, a subsidiary of Le.com. Founder of Le.com, Jia Yueting, was also from Linfen.
