= Coolpad =

Chinese telecommunications equipment company

Coolpad Group Limited
- Formerly: China Wireless Technologies
- Type: Public
- Traded as: SEHK: 2369
- Industry: Consumer electronics
- Founded: 29 April 1993; 33 years ago (as Yulong Computer); 2002 (as China Wireless Tech.)
Founder
Guo Deying	(as chairman)
Shenzhen University	(as shareholder)
Dickman Enterprises	(as shareholder)
Headquarters
Shenzhen, China	(general office)
Cayman Islands	(registered office)
Hong Kong	(second office)
- Area served: Worldwide
Key people
Chen Jiajun	(CEO)
Leung Siu Kee	(director)
Lam Ting Fung Freeman	(director)
Liang Rui	(director)
- Products: Smartphones
- Revenue: ▼HK$1,277 million (2018)
- Net income: ▲HK$ -409 million (2018)
- Total assets: ▼HK$3,117 million (2018)
- Total equity: ▼HK$414 million (2018)
Owner
Chen Jiajun	(17.83%)
Zeal	(10.95%)
Guo Deying	(9.21%)
- Number of employees: ▼637 (Dec.2018)
- Subsidiaries: Yulong Computer (100%)

Chinese name
- Simplified Chinese: 酷派集团有限公司
- Traditional Chinese: 酷派集團有限公司
- Hanyu Pinyin: Kùpài jítuán yǒuxiàn gōngsī
- Literal meaning: Coolpad Group Limited
Transcriptions
Standard Mandarin
- Hanyu Pinyin: Kùpài jítuán yǒuxiàn gōngsī

Chinese short name
- Simplified Chinese: 酷派
- Traditional Chinese: 酷派
- Hanyu Pinyin: Kùpài
- Literal meaning: Coolpad (Note: The Chinese word sound like "Coolpad", while 酷 itself was the translation of "cool"; 派 itself means "school of thought".)
Transcriptions
Standard Mandarin
- Hanyu Pinyin: Kùpài
- Website: www.coolpad.com www.coolpad.us (alternate US site)

Coolpad Group Limited (stylized in its lower logo coolpɑd) is a Chinese telecommunications equipment company headquartered in Shenzhen, Guangdong. It is incorporated in the Cayman Islands and listed on the Hong Kong Stock Exchange as SEHK: 2369. It was one of the largest smartphone companies in China. Since acquired by Jia Yueting, it was part of LeEco Group, but not under the group's mainland parent company Leshi Holding.

== History ==
=== Yulong Computer Telecommunication Scientific ===
Yulong Computer Telecommunication Scientific (Shenzhen) Co., Ltd. (Chinese: 宇龙计算机通信科技（深圳）有限公司) is a wholly owned subsidiary and predecessor of Coolpad Group, that was incorporated on 29 April 1993 in Shenzhen, China. It was a Sino-foreign joint venture, which Shenzhen University Culture Technology Services owned 52% stake, and a Hong Kong-incorporated company Dickman Enterprises owned 48%. Guo Deying (Chinese: 郭德英) was the first chairman of Yulong who later became the largest shareholder and chairman of Coolpad Group. Guo was an academic staff of the Shenzhen University, which he resigned in order to lead Yulong in that year. Dickman Enterprises was majority owned by Tsang Dick-man (Chinese: 曾迪民) for 60% shares, which Dickman Enterprises nominated him as the director of Yulong until July 2001.

In 1999, a 52% stake of Yulong, that was held by Shenzhen University, was sold to wife and mother-in-law of Guo for CN¥3.81 million. in June 2001, the remaining 48% was also acquired by Guo and his wife from Dickman Enterprises for CN¥1.488 million, making Guo, his wife and his mother-in-law owned 100% stake of Yulong.

Yulong at first was a maker of pagers and paging systems. In 2002 the company started to make mobile phones.

=== Coolpad Group ===
Coolpad was originally the smartphone brand of Yulong. In 2002, an overseas holding company, China Wireless Technologies Limited was incorporated in the Cayman Islands, for the shares of Yulong; China Wireless Technologie's shares were floated in Hong Kong stock exchange in 2004, which was considered as an international/offshore market for mainland Chinese companies and citizens.

In 2003, China Wireless made the first Chinese CDMA1X-based smartphone, with color display and hand writing input. In the next year, the company made a dual SIM-slot phone. In 2005 the company made a phone with dual SIM-slot which could operated simultaneity in both GSM and CDMA-based mobile networks, which was the first manufacturer in the world to invent it.

In 2012, Coolpad was one of the major brands that Chinese would buy in the domestic market, along with Chinese brands Lenovo, Huawei and ZTE (The big 4) and import brands Samsung, Apple Inc. and Nokia.

China Wireless was officially renamed Coolpad Group Limited at the end of 2013. In the eve of termination of the tie-in sales agreement with the majority state-owned mobile phone carrier China Mobile in 2014, the group started to sell their products via online stores.

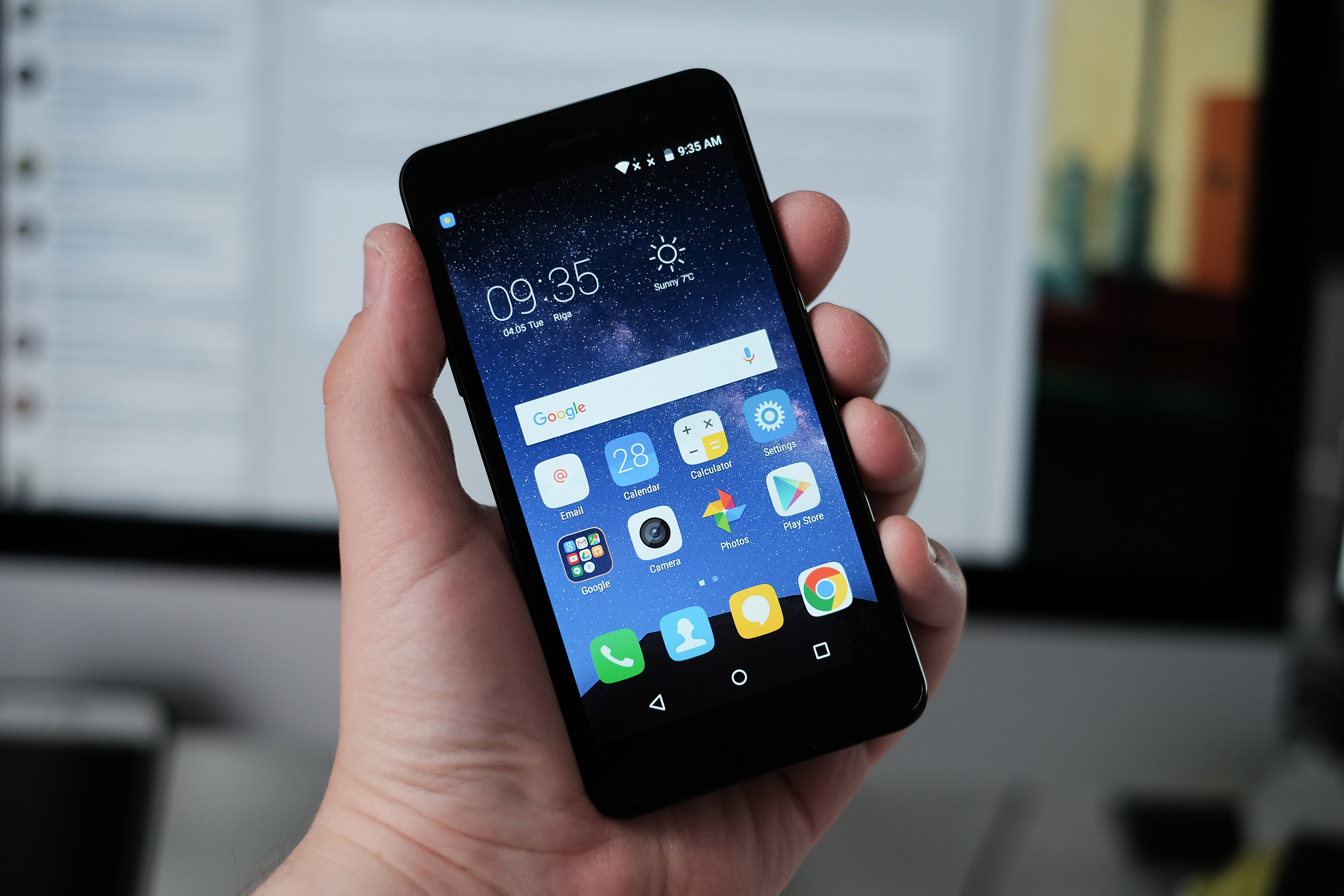
CoolPad

The group was included in Forbes' Asia's Fab(ulous) 50 Companies once, in 2015 edition. However, the company was suffered from the poor sales of their 3G smartphones in 2015 financial year, which saw a 41% drop in total revenue; thanks to 3% increase in revenue of 4G smartphones and extraordinary profit by selling part of the stake of Coolpad E-commerce, the company avoided a net loss but a net profit of HK$2.3 billion. In December 2014 the company formed Coolpad E-commerce, a joint venture with Qihoo 360 in 55-45 ratio, but in mid-2015, chairman and largest shareholder, Guo, sold part of the shares of Coolpad Group to Qihoo 360's competitor, Jia Yueting of LeEco Group, despite Jia used an overseas holding company Lele Holding, instead of domestic incorporated LeEco (a.k.a. Beijing Leshi Holding) to acquire the shares. LeMobile, a subsidiary of LeEco, was also a producer of smartphone.

In December 2016, Coolpad Group sold 80% stake of a subsidiary "Shenzhen Coolpad Mobile Tech" (Chinese: 深圳市酷派移动科技), which runs the smartphone brand "ivvi", to another Chinese technology company SuperD that specialize in virtual reality and augmented reality. Coolpad Group retained 20% stake in Coolpad Mobile.

According to a research by Canalys, neither Coolpad nor sister brand LeMobile (of Jia's Le.com) were the major brands of the domestic smartphone market, in any of 2016, nor in the first quarter of 2017.

Since acquired by Jia Yueting, Yulong/Coolpad Group also sold mobile phone parts to Lesai Mobile HK (Chinese: 樂賽移動香港), associate company of Coolpad Group (they shared the same largest shareholder Leview Mobile HK). The connected transaction was renewed on 16 May 2017; in 2016 the transaction value in the connected deal was HK$192.774 million. The shares of Coolpad Group was also suspended from trading since 31 March 2017, as the external auditor requested the company to provide more information, in order to verify the 2016 financial statements of the company.

In October 2017, the company also entered real estate industry by signing a cooperative agreement with a Chinese developer, in order to re-develop its old headquarters in Shenzhen: "Coolpad Information Harbor". In November 2017, Jia Yueting resigned as the chairman and a member of the board, 4 months after he was resigned from sister company Le.com. Two more non-executive directors also followed Jia to resign, including former CEO Liu Jiangfeng, who already resigned as CEO in mid-2017. Jia soon sold all the shares he held in January 2018.

Coolpad then shifted to sell phones in the United States market. However, days after vice-chairman and CEO Jiang Chao appearance in the Consumer Electronics Show, he was removed from the board and other positions in January 2019. In April 2019, after a net loss of HK$2,674 million in 2017 financial year, the company had announced that the net loss of 2018 financial year had decreased to HK$409 million, despite the revenue of the company had also decreased.

== Ownership ==
During 2015 Jia Yueting became the second largest shareholder of Coolpad; he became the largest shareholder in the next year. As of 31 December 2015 Jia owned 17.92% shares. (via "Leview Mobile HK" (Chinese: 樂風移動香港), a subsidiary of BVI-incorporated Lele Holding; Jia owned 100% stake of Lele Holding) In August 2016, Lele Holding purchased an additional 10.97% shares from the founder and former largest shareholder Guo Deying, making Lele Holding the largest shareholder for 28.83% shares. Guo retained 9.22% shares as the second largest shareholder.

However, it was also reported that the aforementioned 11% was owned by Le.com instead (was claimed by Le.com as the owner, via a private equity fund since 2016), which was owned by Zeal Limited since January 2018 according to Coolpad. The additional 18% that previously owned by Jia, was sold to Power Sun Ventures in the same month; Power Sun Ventures was owned by Chen Jiajun (Chinese: 陳家俊).

As of 31 December 2015, rest of the shares (about 61.95%) were small investors who were not require to disclose their interests to pursuant to Section 336 of the Securities & Futures Ordinance of Hong Kong. Despite all of the member of the board directors of Coolpad Group also owned small stakes that were required to disclose their interests to pursuant to another section of the ordinance: Jiang Chao (0.59%), Li Bin (1.58%), Li Wang (0.59%), as well as independent directors Chan King Chung (0.01%), Huang Dazhan (0.01%) and Xie Weixin (0.01%).

== Controversies ==
On 17 December 2014, Palo Alto Networks announced it had found a backdoor on many Coolpad handsets, and dubbed it "CoolReaper".
