= Jia Yueting =

Chinese entrepreneur

- Born: 15 December 1973 (age 52); Xiangfen, Shanxi, China
- Other name: YT Jia
- Education: Shanxi Provincial Finance and Taxation Vocational College
- Occupation: Businessman
- Known for: Founder and CPUO(Chief product and User Ecosystem Officer), Faraday Future, Founder and Ex-CEO, LeEco
Board member of
Faraday Future
- Spouse: Gan Wei (m. 2008–2020)
- Children: 3

Chinese name
- Simplified Chinese: 贾跃亭
- Traditional Chinese: 賈躍亭
Transcriptions
Standard Mandarin
- Hanyu Pinyin: Jiǎ Yuètíng

Jia Yueting (Chinese: 贾跃亭; born 15 December 1973, YT Jia) is a Chinese businessman who is the founder of Leshi Holding Group and the former CEO of Faraday Future. He previously founded LeEco and the Le.com subsidiary LeSports, and is the former chairman and CEO of Le.com as well as the former chairman of both Coolpad Group and Sinotel Technologies.

Jia has been involved in several financial controversies related to his companies. In 14 October 2019, he filed for bankruptcy with a personal debt of over US$3.6 billion.

In April 2025, Jia was appointed co-CEO of Faraday Future.

== Early life ==
Jia Yueting was born in Xiangfen, Shanxi, China in December 1973. Jia completed his undergraduate studies at Shanxi Provincial Finance and Taxation Vocational College (Chinese: 山西省财政税务专科学校) with concentration in finance. He once took executive courses in the private business school Cheung Kong Graduate School of Business (Chinese: 长江商学院) with unspecified time.

== Career ==
Jia started as a tech support personnel in a Shanxi Province tax office.

=== Sinotel Technologies / Xbell Communication ===
Jia was the owner of former Singapore-listed company Sinotel Technologies. Before the privatization of the company, Jia owned 26% of its shares. Sinotel Technologies was the parent company of Xbell Union Communication and second-tier subsidiaries Shanxi Xbell Communication (Chinese: 山西西贝尔通信科技). A subsidiary, Xbell Investment, was sold by Sinotel Technologies to LeEco (Leshi Holdings Beijing), another company owned by Jia Yueting.

=== Leshi, LeEco & Le.com ===
Jia founded Le.com and later LeEco (Leshi Holding Beijing). In 2015, he purchased Coolpad Group from Guo Deying via Lele Holding and intermediate holding company LeEco Global.

In July 2017, he resigned as the chairman and CEO of Le.com. He was replaced by Sun Hongbin, chairman of the second largest shareholder of Le.com, Sunac China. Le.com general manager Liang Jun and Le Vision Pictures chairman and CEO Zhang Zhao were also elected onto the board.

On 25 December 2017, the Beijing Bureau of China Securities Regulatory Commission publicly ordered Jia to return to China to take his responsibility as the controlling shareholder of Le.com. Jia refused to return, sending his wife instead to solve the financial issues, which sparked criticism from the Chinese government and the online community. Jia had sold part of the share of Le.com and lend the same amount of money he received to the listed company, which he made a written agreement with the company for the loan. However, the loan was not renewed, making the financial troubles of the company even worse.

=== Lucid Motors ===
Jia Yueting involvement with Lucid Motors started in 2014, when LeEco, along with other investors, invested $100 million into Atieva (Lucid Motors's former name). In April 2016, Jia Yueting used money he previously borrowed in China to purchase a stake of over 20 percent in Lucid Motors, a direct competitor of Faraday Future. The move was characterized by some industry observers as "a destructive strategy", with people pointing out that Jia actually did not want Lucid Motors to succeed.

As of February 2019, Jia still owns a large stake in Lucid Motors.

=== Faraday Future ===
Jia is a co-founder of Faraday Future. At the end of 2017, he became the CEO of the company, moving to California to perform his duties. He then sold the majority stake of Faraday Future to Evergrande Health, a subsidiary of Evergrande Group while remaining as the CEO of the company. He later sued Evergrande for withholding promised payments but reached an agreement to settle the litigation, after which Evergrande restructured its US$2 billion investment for a 32% stake.

On 5 July 2017, Jia moved to Los Angeles, claiming that his trip to the US was due to the related financial affairs of Faraday Future.

The first pre-production FF 91 model from Faraday Future has rolled off the line at the company's facility in Hanford, California on 28 August 2018. Jia tweeted that this is the "new species" of electric vehicle.

On 20 July 2021, Jia and Faraday Future announced that it had completed a merger with Property Solutions Acquisition Corp. (“PSAC”), a special purpose acquisition company, to commence trading on the Nasdaq Stock Market on 22 July 2021 under the ticker symbols “FFIE” and “FFIEW”, respectively. The listing raised $1 billion dollars to finance the production of the FF 91 and FF 81 electric vehicles.

On 10 November 2021, Jia and Faraday Future announced that it received the Certificate of Occupancy (“COO”) for its Hanford manufacturing facility, and on 13 December 2021, the company reached its third production milestone with the start of construction for all remaining production areas at the Hanford plant, including body, propulsion, warehouse and vehicle assembly.

Faraday Future announced on 9 February 2022, that Myoung Shin Co., Ltd., an automotive manufacturer headquartered in South Korea, had been contracted to manufacture Faraday Future’s second vehicle, the FF 81, with SOP scheduled for 2024. The FF 81 is a luxury, mass-market electric vehicle from FF, with advanced connectivity and a user experience tailored to a wider audience than the FF 91, which was scheduled to launch in Q3 2022. The plant in Gunsan, where the FF 81 will be manufactured, offers scale, flexibility, and port access. Pursuant to the agreement, Myoung Shin will maintain sufficient manufacturing capabilities and capacity to supply FF 81 vehicles in accordance with FF’s forecasts.

On 24 April, Jia was appointed Co-CEO of Faraday Future. According to FF, "this marks a fundamental change in top management structure and decision-making in the Company. YT also announced a series of key transformations he hopes will bring Company success. YT’s newly created equity incentive plan is directly linked to market capitalization and stock price."

=== Financial issues ===
In 2017, a court in Shanghai issued a freezing order on 1.2 billion renminbi worth of Jia Yueting's assets in China. After leaving China, Yueting spent at least US$21 million on beach houses and properties in California.

He has been dubbed by some English media outlets as "China's Steve Jobs", although lately it has been used to showcase the overexpansion of his technology companies. Jia has been dubbed by some Chinese media outlets as a "PowerPoint CEO", a reference to his long history of repetitively announcing vaporwares.

In December 2017, Jia was named to China's debt blacklist after he violated a court order by refusing to return to China to pay up more than 470 million RMB that he owed to Ping An Group.

In late 2018, courts in both British Virgin Islands and California, enforced freezing of Jia's assets, including his ownership stake in Faraday Future and the properties he owned in California.

In January 2019, Shimao Gongsan, a major shopping complex owned by Jia Yueting in Beijing's Sanlitun area, failed to be sold in an online auction.

In October 2019, Jia filed for Chapter 11 bankruptcy in Delaware, USA. Yueting owed billions of dollars to more than 100 creditors in China.

In December 2019, the Department of Justice accused Jia of engaging in dishonest behavior during the bankruptcy and filed a motion to have a new bankruptcy trustee appointed. The Office of the US Trustee criticized Jia and said that in general they had found him to be untrustworthy during their dealings with him.

On 21 May 2020 the United States Bankruptcy Court for the Central District of California entered an order officially confirming a chapter 11 reorganization plan for Jia.

== Personal life ==
He married Gan Wei in 2008. Gan Wei filed for divorce from Jia Yueting in late 2019.
