= Sun Jihai Youth Training Football Base =

Football academy in Chongqing, China

Sun Jihai & The European Garden for City Youth Training Football Base
- Address: The European Garden for City, Chongqing
- Owner: Sunac
- Type: Football Training Complex

Construction
- Built: 2015-16

The Sun Jihai & The European Garden for City Youth Training Football Base is a future football academy based in Chongqing in China. The brainchild of footballer and former China national team captain Sun Jihai, the academy will be funded by Sunac and based in their The European Garden for City complex.

== Facilities ==
The central feature of the academy will be its full-sized 11-a-side pitch, laid out to FIFA A-grade standard. In addition, the almost 99-acre development will feature three seven-a-side pitches and six five-a-side pitches.

== Affiliations ==
While owned and operated independently of any football club, the Youth Training Football Base will work in conjunction with renowned teams from around the world to bring in top-level youth football coaches, particularly from Valencia as well as those from Jihai's former club Manchester City. Additionally, in order to enhance the development and experience of the youths in the program, the academy will run various summer camps and events allowing its participants to travel to the academies of foreign clubs to train in Manchester as well as at other world class club facilities around Europe.
