= Huaxia Life Insurance =

Chinese insurance company

- Trade name: Hua Insurance
- Company type: private
- Industry: Financial services
- Founded: 30 December 2006
- Headquarters: Tianjin, China
- Services: life insurance
- Revenue: ▲CN¥27.563 billion (2015)
- Operating income: ▲CN¥2.344 billion (2015)
- Net income: ▲CN¥1.464 billion (2015)
- Total assets: ▲CN¥263.845 billion (2015)
- Total equity: ▲CN¥16.924 billion (2015)
- Footnotes / references in a consolidated basis, excluding minority interest

Huaxia Life Insurance Co., Ltd.
- Simplified Chinese: 华夏人寿保险股份有限公司
- Literal meaning: Huaxia Life Insurance, Company Limited by Shares

Alternative Chinese name
- Simplified Chinese: 华夏保险
- Literal meaning: Huaxia Insurance

Huaxia Life Insurance Co., Ltd. known also as Hua Insurance in English, is a Chinese insurance company based in Tianjin. In July 2020, the Chinese government announced that it would take over the company.

== Equity investments ==
As of 31 December 2015

- Guangzhou Aoyu (46.04%)
- Leshi Zhixin (1.1310%)
- Ping An Insurance (3.40%)

== Shareholders ==
As of 31 December 2015

- Chinese: 北京世纪力宏计算机软件 (20.00%)
- Chinese: 北京千禧世豪电子科技 (20.00%)
- Chinese: 山东零度聚阵商贸 (14.90%)
- Chinese: 北京中胜世纪科技 (13.40%)
- Chinese: 北京百利博文技术 (13.37%)
- Chinese: 天津华宇天地商贸 (11.24%)
- Tianjin Port Group (5.23%)
- Chinese: 内蒙古金平投资 (0.98%)
- Chinese: 北京龙达鑫锐科贸 (0.35%)
- Chinese: 中国京安信用担保 (0.30%)
- Chinese: 礼泉县袁家投资 (0.13%)
- Chinese: 北京国伦咨询顾问 (0.09%)
