= Faraday Future FF 91 =

American electric full-size SUV

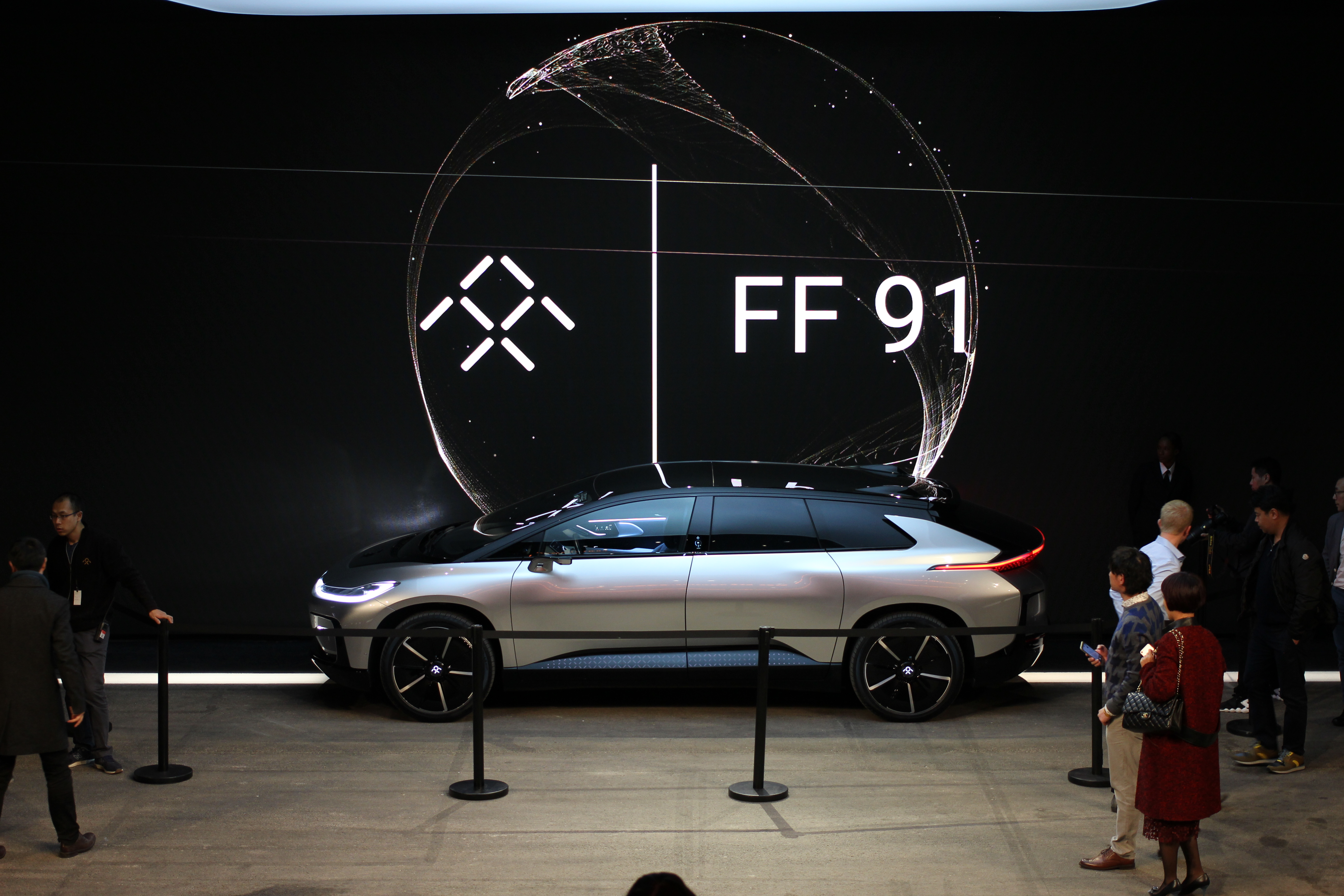
- The unveiling of the Faraday Future FF 91 at CES 2017

Overview
- Manufacturer: Faraday Future
- Production: 2023–present
- Assembly: Hanford, California, United States
- Designer: John Buckingham

Body and chassis
- Class: Full-size SUV
- Body style: 5-door crossover SUV
- Doors: 4

Powertrain
- Power output: 1,050 hp (783 kW)
- Transmission: Single-speed
- Battery: 142 kWh
- Range: 381 Miles, EPA
- Electric range: 381 Miles, EPA
- Plug-in charging: 15.3 kW AC; 500 kW DC Fast Charging

Dimensions
- Wheelbase: 3,200 mm (126.0 in)
- Length: 5,250 mm (206.7 in)
- Width: 2,283 mm (89.9 in)
- Height: 1,611 mm (63.4 in)

The Faraday Future FF 91 (F-F-Nine-One) is an electric full-size luxury crossover SUV produced by American EV startup Faraday Future since 2023 as the company's first production vehicle. By early 2025, several units of the FF 91 2.0 Futurist Alliance had been delivered to customers, including a boutique investment bank in New York, entrepreneur Luke Hans, and retail investor Jun He. Other deliveries went to public figures such as singer Chris Brown, racing driver Justin Bell, Hollywood agent Kelvin Sherman, and entrepreneur Emma Hernan.

== Overview ==
The Faraday Future FF 91 debuted on January 3, 2017, at the Consumer Electronics Show in Las Vegas, Nevada, United States, as a prototype. Production of the FF 91 began on March 29, 2023, after having been delayed since 2018, with deliveries of the car, as well as its $14,900 FF aiHypercar+ mobility ecosystem annual subscription service, starting on May 31, 2023.

The FF 91 has three variations: the FF 91 2.0 Futurist Alliance, the FF 91 2.0 Futurist, and the FF 91 2.0.

=== Design and development ===
The Faraday Future FF 91 was first presented as a concept vehicle at the Consumer Electronics Show (CES) in January 2017. Internally developed under the name "Project X," it was intended as the company’s flagship luxury electric vehicle. The exterior and interior design were overseen by Richard Kim, formerly a lead designer for BMW’s i-series vehicles, with an emphasis on aerodynamics and interior space.

The FF 91 is built on Faraday Future’s Variable Platform Architecture (VPA), a modular electric vehicle platform developed to support multiple body styles and powertrains. Engineering and development work took place at the company’s Los Angeles headquarters and at research and development facilities in China.

Between 2018 and 2022, the vehicle underwent testing and public prototype demonstrations, including an autonomous valet parking demonstration at CES 2017.

== Specifications ==
=== AI technology and autonomous driving ===
The FF 91 is equipped with the FF aiHyper 6x4 Architecture 2.0 operating system, which enables autonomous driving in the car as well as the integration of other AI-powered amenities.

=== Battery and performance ===
The FF 91 has an EPA-rated range of 381 mi (613 km), and a 0–60 mph (0–97 km/h) time of 2.27 seconds. It is equipped with a 142 kWh battery and tri-motor setup that outputs a combined 1,050 hp (780 kW) and 1,977 N⋅m (1,458 lb⋅ft) of torque. The projected top speed is 155 mph (249 km/h).

=== Powertrain ===
The tri-motor configuration provides all-wheel drive. The vehicle also incorporates integrated multi-axis torque technology for AI-assisted propulsion, steering, and braking, combining performance, range, and ride control.

=== Charging ===
The FF 91 2.0 supports DC fast charging up to 500 amps and AC charging at 15.3 kW. The company has indicated that vehicle-to-grid (V2G) and vehicle-to-load (V2L) functions are under development.

=== Chassis and dimensions ===
- Length: 5,250 mm (206.7 in)
- Wheelbase: 3,200 mm (126 in)
- Height: 1,611 mm (63.4 in)
- Curb weight: 2,922 kg (6,442 lbs)
- Cargo capacity: 376 liters (13.3 ft³)
- Wheels: 22-inch forged aluminum alloy
- Suspension: all-terrain AI body control technology system

=== Interior and features ===
The interior includes 11 displays in total, including a 27-inch rear passenger screen and a 17-inch front passenger display. Features include rear legroom of 48.9 in, zero-gravity seats with 60-degree recline, facial recognition entry, voice-activated controls, and over-the-air software update capability.

=== Connectivity ===
The FF 91 uses Nvidia Orin X as its ADAS/AD computing platform and dual Qualcomm 8155p processors for in-vehicle operations. It supports connectivity via three onboard 5G modules (Super AP 5G, multi-carrier). Additional features include the FFID recognition system for personalized user profiles and AI-based driving and cabin systems, marketed as aiDriving and AI Space & Internet Technology, which combine general AI, personalized AI, and one-on-one private AI functions.

=== Trim levels ===
The base-level FF 91, the 2.0 Futurist, has a starting price of $249,000. Faraday Future also commemorated the launch with the FF 91 2.0 Futurist Alliance edition priced at $309,000 and limited to 300 units.

== Variations ==
=== FF 91 2.0 Futurist Alliance ===
The FF 91 2.0 Futurist Alliance has three motors with a maximum of 1,050 horsepower. The electric motor output torque is 1,977 N⋅m (1,458 lb⋅ft) and wheel torque 13,285 N⋅m (9,799 lb⋅ft). The 0–60 mph (97 km/h) acceleration speed is 2.27 seconds, with a battery pack energy of 142 kWh, an EPA-certified range of 381 miles (613 km). In the US, it supports AT&T, Verizon and T-Mobile with an in-car network speed of 10 Gbit/s Ethernet. Additionally, the vehicle has 10+ screens with 100+ inch total display area.

The FF 91 2.0 Futurist Alliance is equipped with three motors producing a combined output of 1,050 horsepower and 1,977 N⋅m (1,458 lb⋅ft) of electric motor torque, with wheel torque reaching 13,285 N⋅m (9,799 lb⋅ft). It has a 142 kWh battery pack and an EPA-certified range of 381 miles (613 km). The vehicle accelerates from 0–60 mph (97 km/h) in 2.27 seconds.

The model incorporates a structural design described by the company as a “moat body structure” and “moat pack structure,” which integrate the aluminum body with the battery housing to provide a side-impact crumple zone and additional protection for both occupants and the high-voltage battery system.

In the United States, the vehicle supports AT&T, Verizon, and T-Mobile networks with in-car connectivity enabled by three 5G modems, designed to improve coverage and reduce latency. The system delivers in-car network speeds of up to 10 Gbit/s Ethernet. Additionally, the vehicle includes more than ten screens with a combined display area exceeding 100 inches.

Technology architecture

In 2025, Faraday Future announced an updated technology framework for the FF 91 2.0, referred to as the "FF aiHyper 6x4 Architecture 2.0." According to the company, the “6x4” designation refers to the integration of six technology platforms and four technology systems.

- Technology platforms: FF OpenApp, FF aiOS 2, FF aiHW 2.0, FF Mechanical, FF Cloud, and FF AI.
- Technology systems: Magic All-In-One, Hyper Multi-Vectoring, 3rd aiSpace, and FF aiDriving.

== Systems ==
=== Magic All-In-One ===
The Magic All-In-One system is described by the company as an AI-based body control technology that integrates performance, handling, and ride comfort. It combines control functions for propulsion, body, and suspension into a single computing module.

=== Hyper Multi-Vectoring ===
The Hyper Multi-Vectoring system is an AI-enabled torque vectoring system that adjusts power distribution, steering, and braking across multiple axes to optimize handling under varying driving conditions.

=== 3rd aiSpace ===
The 3rd aiSpace system incorporates three 5G modems, allowing the vehicle to connect simultaneously to multiple carriers. This setup is intended to provide redundancy and maintain connectivity if one or more networks are unavailable.

=== FF aiDriving ===
The FF aiDriving system refers to the vehicle’s driver-assistance technology. It uses AI-based software that combines elements of general AI and personalized AI for adaptive assisted driving functions.
