= Cixi, Zhejiang =

Cixi 慈溪市 Tzeki
- County-level city
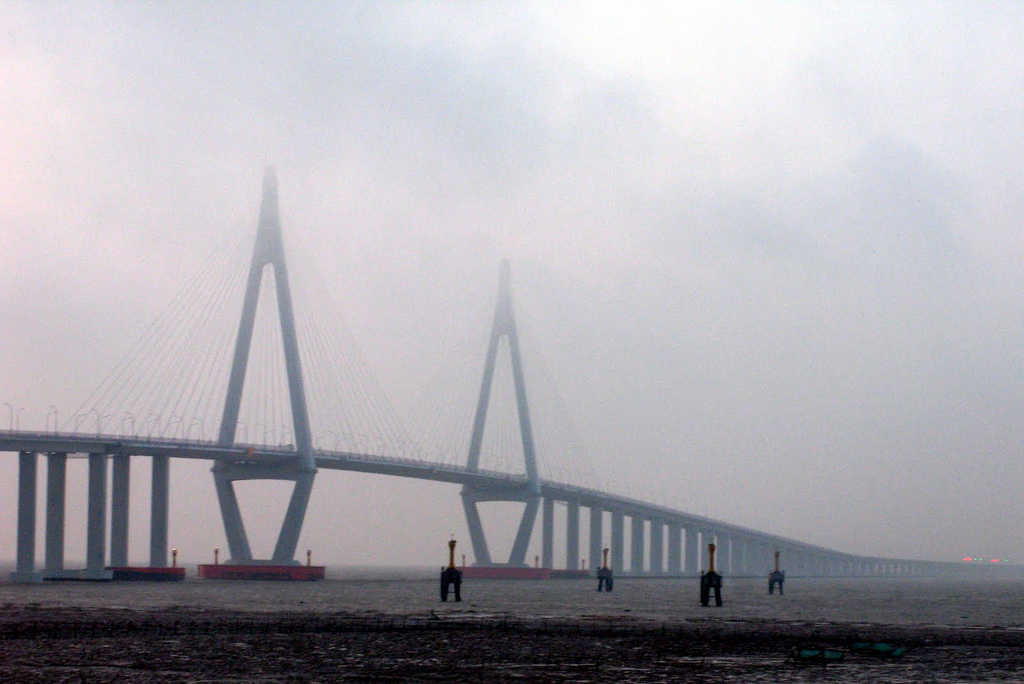
- Hangzhou Bay Bridge

- Cixi City in Ningbo City

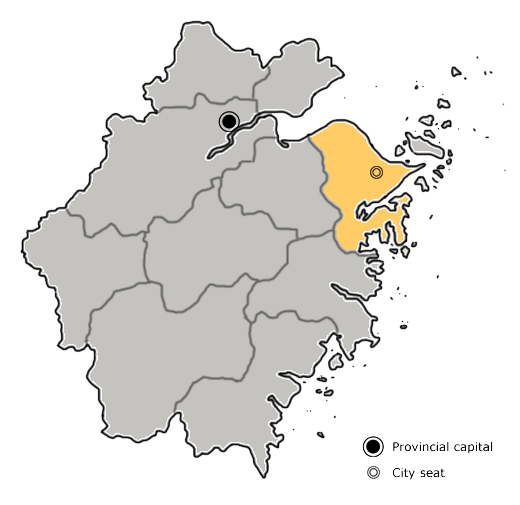
- Ningbo City in Zhejiang
- Coordinates: 30°10′N 121°14′E
- Country: People's Republic of China
- Province: Zhejiang
- Sub-provincial city: Ningbo

Area
  - County-level city: 1,360.63 km^{2} (525.34 sq mi)
  - Urban: 1,360.63 km^{2} (525.34 sq mi)
  - Metro: 2,861.43 km^{2} (1,104.80 sq mi)

Population (2020 census)
  - County-level city: 1,462,383
  - Density: 1,074.78/km^{2} (2,783.68/sq mi)
  - Urban: 1,829,488
  - Urban density: 1,344.59/km^{2} (3,482.47/sq mi)
  - Metro: 3,083,520
  - Metro density: 1,077.62/km^{2} (2,791.01/sq mi)
- Time zone: UTC+8 (China Standard)
- Postal code: 315300
- Area code: 330282
- Website: cixi.gov.cn

Cixi
- Traditional Chinese: 慈谿
- Simplified Chinese: 慈溪
- Postal: Tzeki
Transcriptions
Standard Mandarin
- Hanyu Pinyin: Cíxī
- Wade–Giles: Tz'u²-hsi¹
- IPA: t͡sʰz̩³⁵ɕi⁵⁵
Wu
- Romanization: zy^{去}shie^{平}

Cixi, formerly romanized as Tzeki, is a county-level city under the jurisdiction of the sub-provincial city of Ningbo, in northeastern Zhejiang province, China. As of the 2020 census, its population was 1,829,488. Its urban agglomeration built-up (or metro) area, largely contiguous with Cixi plus the county-level city of Yuyao, had 3,083,520 inhabitants.

== History ==
Cixi was part of the state of Yue in the Spring and Autumn period (770–476 B.C.). The county was set up in the Qin dynasty. At first it was called "Gouzhang" and has been using the name of "Cixi" since the Kaiyuan reign of the Tang dynasty (738 A.D.).

== Geography ==
Cixi City is located on the south of the economic circle of Yangtze River Delta, and is 60 km (37 mi) from Ningbo in the east, 148 km (92 mi) from Shanghai in the north and 138 km (86 mi) from Hangzhou in the west. Since 1047, the City has been constantly expanding into the sea, forming rings of roads and canals like a tree. There are twelve ring roads in June 2026.

=== Climate ===
Cixi is located in the Zhejiang Province of eastern China and has a subtropical monsoon climate with an average temperature of 17 °C (63 °F).

Climate data for Cixi, elevation 5 m (16 ft), (1991–2020 normals, extremes 1981–present)
Month	Jan	Feb	Mar	Apr	May	Jun	Jul	Aug	Sep	Oct	Nov	Dec	Year
Record high °C (°F)	24.2 (75.6)	28.1 (82.6)	33.8 (92.8)	35.6 (96.1)	36.3 (97.3)	38.1 (100.6)	40.6 (105.1)	39.9 (103.8)	37.5 (99.5)	33.6 (92.5)	31.3 (88.3)	24.4 (75.9)	40.6 (105.1)
Mean daily maximum °C (°F)	8.8 (47.8)	11.0 (51.8)	15.3 (59.5)	21.4 (70.5)	26.2 (79.2)	28.8 (83.8)	33.7 (92.7)	32.8 (91.0)	28.4 (83.1)	23.4 (74.1)	17.9 (64.2)	11.5 (52.7)	21.6 (70.9)
Daily mean °C (°F)	5.1 (41.2)	6.9 (44.4)	10.8 (51.4)	16.4 (61.5)	21.5 (70.7)	24.9 (76.8)	29.3 (84.7)	28.8 (83.8)	24.6 (76.3)	19.4 (66.9)	13.7 (56.7)	7.4 (45.3)	17.4 (63.3)
Mean daily minimum °C (°F)	2.3 (36.1)	3.6 (38.5)	7.2 (45.0)	12.2 (54.0)	17.5 (63.5)	21.7 (71.1)	25.8 (78.4)	25.6 (78.1)	21.6 (70.9)	16.0 (60.8)	10.2 (50.4)	4.2 (39.6)	14.0 (57.2)
Record low °C (°F)	−6.2 (20.8)	−4.4 (24.1)	−2.6 (27.3)	2.1 (35.8)	7.9 (46.2)	15.0 (59.0)	19.0 (66.2)	18.7 (65.7)	13.4 (56.1)	4.5 (40.1)	−2.0 (28.4)	−5.9 (21.4)	−6.2 (20.8)
Average precipitation mm (inches)	91.5 (3.60)	83.0 (3.27)	120.9 (4.76)	97.9 (3.85)	115.3 (4.54)	213.3 (8.40)	145.0 (5.71)	202.8 (7.98)	161.4 (6.35)	82.9 (3.26)	77.8 (3.06)	71.7 (2.82)	1,463.5 (57.6)
Average precipitation days (≥ 0.1 mm)	12.8	11.5	14.8	13.2	13.4	15.5	11.9	13.2	12.1	8.9	10.2	10.0	147.5
Average snowy days	2.4	1.7	0.6	0	0	0	0	0	0	0	0.1	0.9	5.7
Average relative humidity (%)	79	78	76	73	74	80	75	77	79	77	79	77	77
Mean monthly sunshine hours	100.3	108.3	133.5	159.8	172.8	139.5	224.4	208.8	157.4	153.4	121.3	118.8	1,798.3
Percentage possible sunshine	31	34	36	41	41	33	53	51	43	44	38	38	40
Source: China Meteorological Administration

== Administrative divisions ==
=== Subdistricts ===
- Baisha Road Subdistrict (白沙路街道), Gutang Subdistrict (古塘街道), Hushan Subdistrict (浒山街道), Kandun Subdistrict (坎墩街道), Zonghan Subdistrict (宗汉街道)

=== Towns ===
- Andong (庵东镇), Changhe (长河镇), Chongshou (崇寿镇), Fuhai (附海镇), Guanhaiwei (观海卫镇), Henghe (横河镇), Kuangyan (匡堰镇), Longshan (龙山镇), Qiaotou (桥头镇), Shengshan (胜山镇), Tianyuan (天元镇), Xiaolin (逍林镇), Xinpu (新浦镇), Zhangqi (掌起镇), Zhouxiang (周巷镇)

== Transportation ==
Highway connections are provided to all major cities, typical travel times are 1.5 hours or less by car, including access to the four major airports, Ningbo Lishe International Airport, Hangzhou Xiaoshan International Airport, Shanghai Hongqiao Airport, and Shanghai Pudong International Airport. Shanghai and Ningbo are also the closest sea ports. Hangzhou Bay Bridge connects Cixi to Jiaxing and Shanghai.

== Economy ==
The Hangzhou Bay New District is located in the city.

== Population ==
Cixi is accelerating the construction of a mid-scale modern city, covering a total land area of 1,361 km^{2} (525 sq mi) with a population of 1.83 million as of the 2020 census, including 1.04 million registered permanent residents and one million temporary residents. Fifteen towns and five subdistricts are under the jurisdiction of Cixi City and there are 325 administrative villages including committees and communities.

== Culture ==
The city houses many Yue Kiln Sites, which are widely regarded as one of the origin of Chinese porcelain.

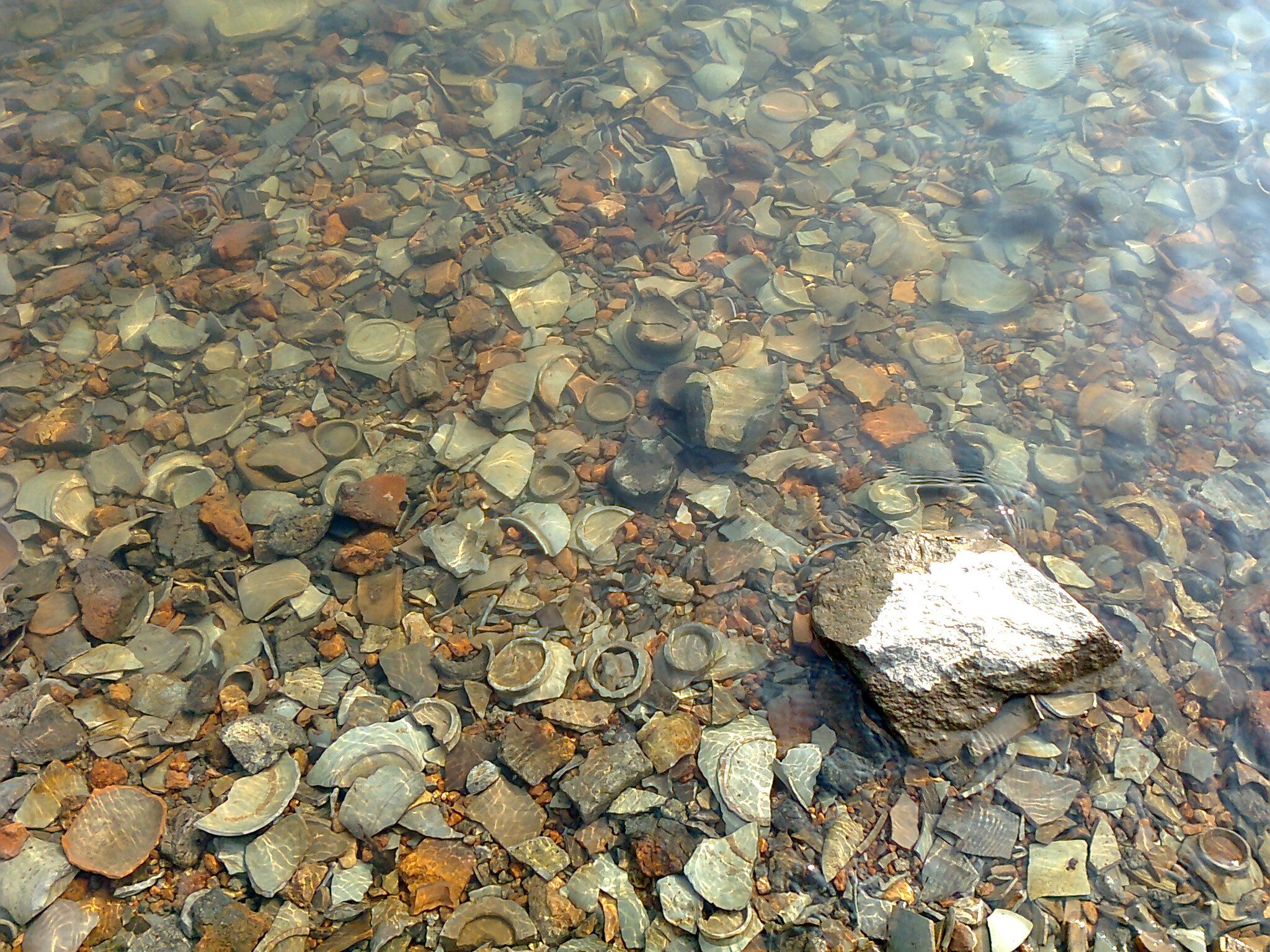
Celadon pieces in Yue Kiln Sites

Cixi has the tradition of advocating culture and emphasizing education, with several thousand years of historical relics and profound cultural background which cultivated three regional cultures, i.e. "celadon, reclamation and immigration". Shanglin Lake celadon has been sold overseas as a "Maritime Silk Road" to the world, historical tideland reclamation area has become one of the areas with the most abundant land reserve resources in Zhejiang Province, and the immigration culture has several years of history.

Cixi was listed as the "demonstration base for community digital learning in the national city and countryside" by the Ministry of Education in 2010 and 2011.

== Notable people ==
- Han Qide, medical scientist and Former President of the China Association for Science and Technology
- Han Zheng, member of Standing Committee of the CPC Central Committee Political Bureau
- Ing Chang-ki, Taiwan industrial magnate
- Lu Yongxiang, Academician and Former President of the Chinese Academy of Sciences
- Lu Zhangong, member of CPC 19th Central Committee
- Tan Jiazhen, founder of modern Chinese genetics
- Yang Xianjiang, educator
- Zhou Xinfang, Master of Beijing Opera
- Zhu Zuxiang, agricultural scientist

== See also ==
- List of twin towns and sister cities in China
