= Shanglin Lake Yue Kilns =

Archeological sites in Zhejiang, China

Coordinates: 30°07′22.08″N 121°20′13.24″E

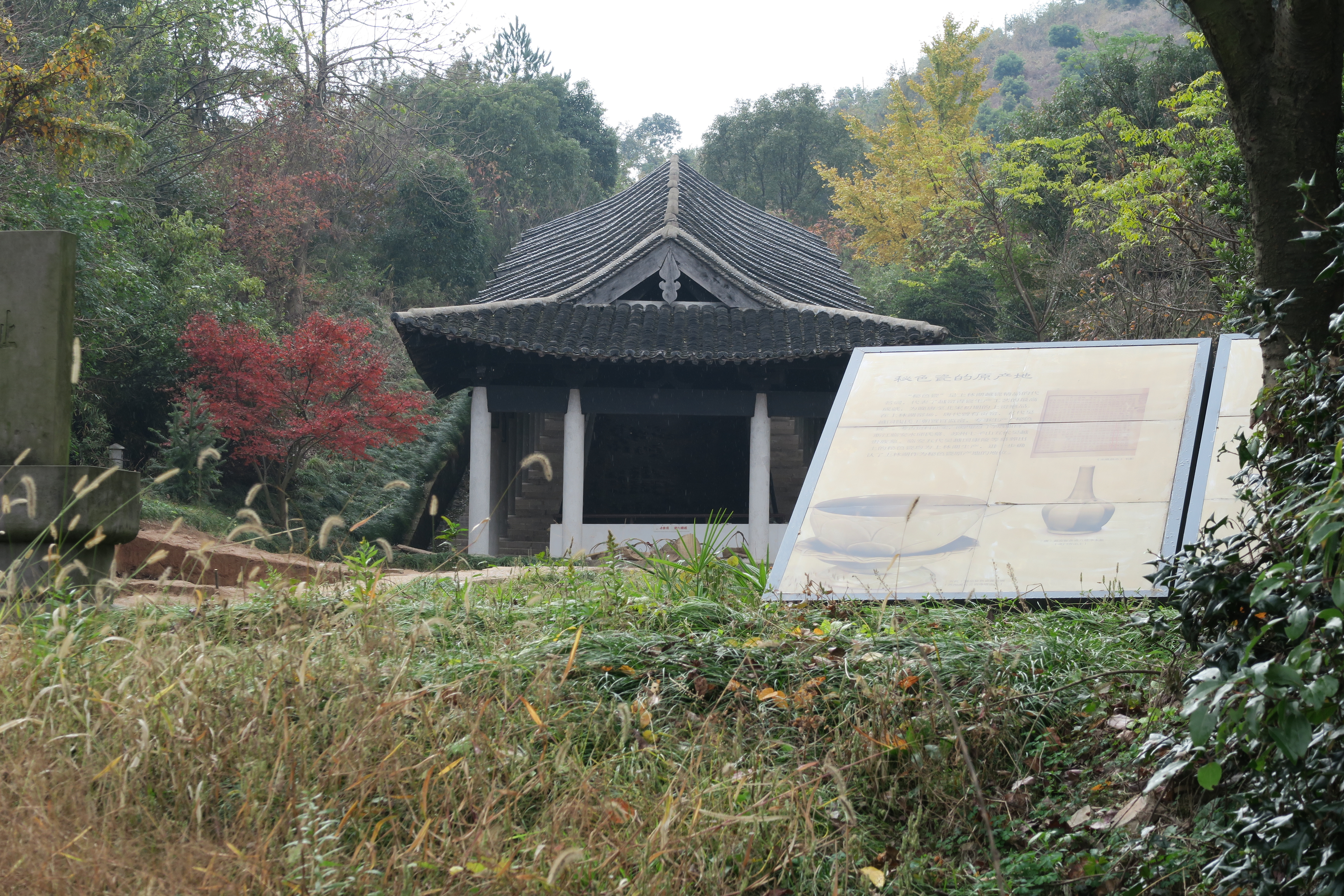

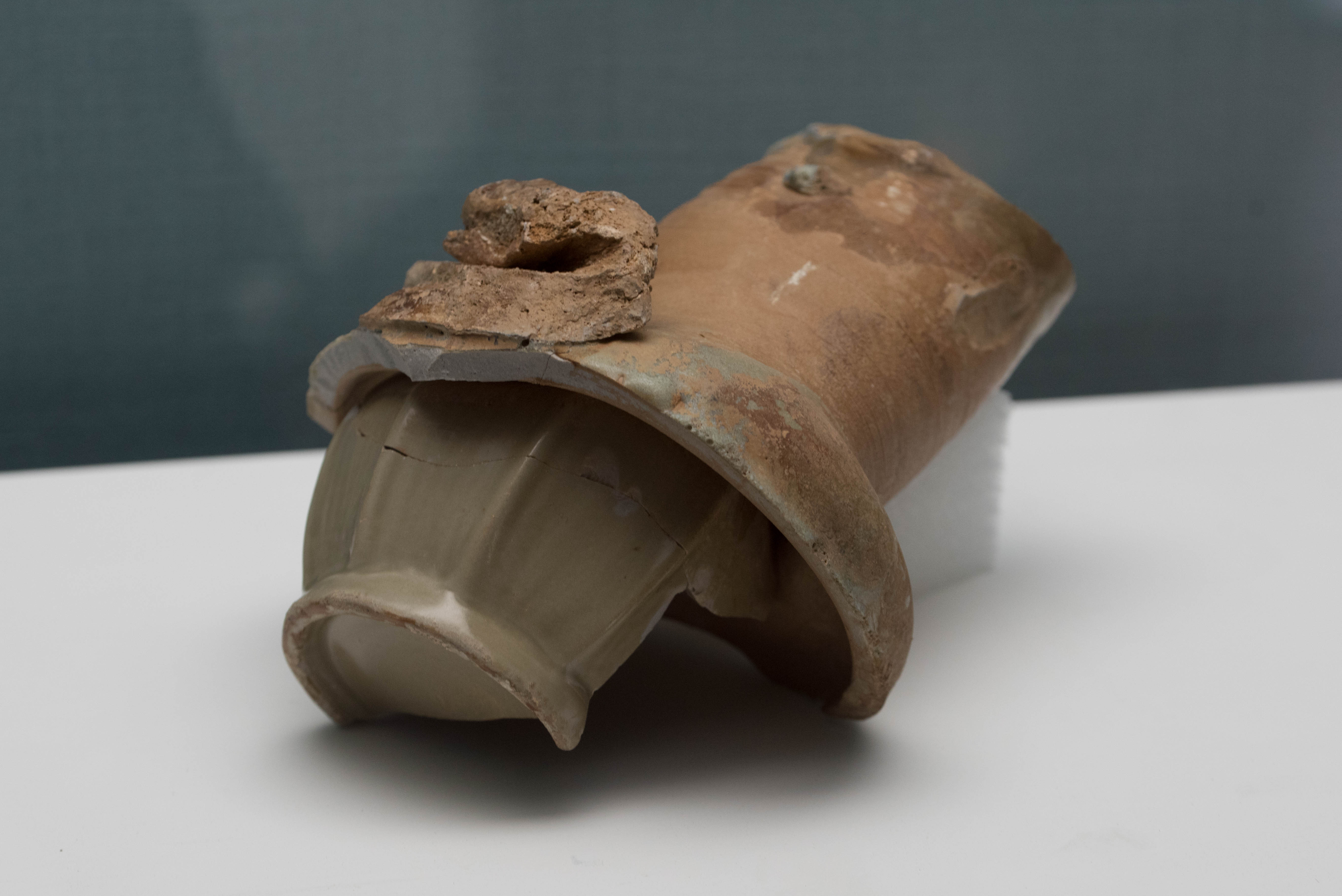
Excavated waster piece

The Shanglin Lake Yue Kilns (Chinese: 上林湖越窑遗址) are a cluster of archaeological sites where Yue ware was made, though they are by no means the only ones. They are located near Shanglin Lake, in Cixi City, Zhejiang, China. The kilns produced celadon around the Shanglin Lake area during the Tang, Han, and Song dynasties are referred to as such. A variety of different wares were manufactured during the kilns' history, including "jars, spittoons, wine pots, incense burners, cups, bowls, flasks, cases, writing-brush basins, dishes, handle-less cups, pots, wine cups, flat bowls, basins", and children's toys.

The roughly 179 kiln sites located in this area appear to have been the earliest original celadon producers in China and elsewhere. From the late Eastern Han dynasty to the Southern Song dynasty (~200–1200 A.D.), celadon was produced in vast amounts and traded in regional networks.

This collection of sites was added to the UNESCO World Heritage Tentative List on March 28, 2008, in the Cultural category.
