= List of Le original programming =

le.com, formerly known as LeTV, is a Chinese video hosting website started in 2004. In 2012, LeTV produced its first web series, Once Upon a Time in Northwest: 20 Years in Gangs, which was later banned by the country due to its violent content. Go Princess Go is one of the most popular shows produced by Le.

== Original programmings ==
=== Drama ===
Title	Genre	Premiere	Seasons	Length	Status
Let's Fun	Sitcom	March 7, 2017	40 episodes	9–11 min.	Ended
Man Comes to Tang Dynasty	Fantasy	May 22, 2013	2 seasons, 80 episodes	24–30 min.	Ended
Go Princess Go	Comedy drama	December 13, 2015	27 episodes	11–37 min.	Ended
Q Queen	Comedy/drama	August 30, 2015	40 episodes	23–40 min.	Ended
Who Sleeps My Bro	Comedy/drama	February 1, 2016	27 episodes	23–24 min.	Ended
Double Sweet Wife	Comedy/drama	May 2, 2017	33 episodes	25 min.	Ended
Inference Notes	Crime drama	November 3, 2017	20 episodes	22–25 min.	Ended
I Love My President Though He Is a Psycho	Comedy/drama	February 24, 2017	10 episodes	60–69 min.	Ended
Luan Ru Qian Kun	Comedy/drama	July 1, 2015	20 episodes	9–15 min.	Ended
Tai Na Ge Le Ba	Comedy	August 25, 2015	32 episodes	4–8 min.	Ended
Pei Jiao Ni Xi Shi Wu Suo	Comedy/fantasy	June 19, 2015	12 episodes	19–24 min.	Ended
Future Mr. Right	Romance/fantasy	July 21, 2015	40 episodes	20–29 min.	Ended
Genius, or Crazy	Drama	November 13, 2015	30 episodes	22–28 min.	Ended
Hua Man Lou	Drama	October 10, 2016	45 episodes	14–25 min.	Ended
Thieves	Comedy	November 17, 2014	20 episodes	11–16 min.	Ended
Diao's Overseas Season 2	Comedy	December 5, 2014	20 episodes	14–19 min.	Ended
Lei Nv Xin Jing	Comedy/drama	March 25, 2014	30 episodes	25–30 min.	Ended
PMAM 2	Drama	September 10, 2014	40 episodes	20–26 min.	Ended
PMAM 3	Drama	February 17, 2015	40 episodes	16–26 min.	Ended
Zhang Zhen Tells Stories	Horror	March 29, 2015	12 episodes	16–27 min.	Ended
STB Super Teacher	Comedy/drama	June 4, 2014	2 seasons, 80 episodes	22–27 min.	Season 1 removed
Xing Se Nan Nv	Comedy/drama	September 11, 2013	30 episodes	21–33 min.	Ended
XGirl	Comedy/drama	December 10, 2013	30 episodes	20–29 min.	Ended
My Name Is Hao Cong Ming	Comedy	March 12, 2013	25 episodes	26–30 min.	Ended
I'm Pregnant with Your Child	Drama	January 1, 2013	50 episodes	24–27 min.	Ended
Suddenly Seventeen	Romance	November 23, 2016	26 episodes	21 - 28 min.	Ended
Youth on the Road 2	Sitcom	November 27, 2014	20 episodes	20–26 min.	Ended
Fashion Together	Comedy	January 23, 2016	30 episodes	15–23 min.	Ended
I Am Shine On	Comedy	September 18, 2014	4 episodes	6–7 min.	Ended
Xue Jie Zhi Dao	Comedy	July 23, 2014	2 seasons, 30 episodes	7–25 min.	Ended
The Bendover	Comedy/sci-fi	December 24, 2012	5 episodes	14–16 min.	Ended
Qing Chun Da Bao Zha	Sitcom	November 26, 2012	20 episodes	24–27 min.	Ended
Finding Soul	Drama	July 11, 2016	25 episodes	15–21 min.	Ended
Tao Hua Yuan	Fantasy/romance	January 26, 2017	40 episodes	23–28 min.	Ended
Brain Burninng	Crime	May 19, 2015	7 episodes	4–9 min.	Ended
Wei Xiang	Drama	January 1, 2014	13 episodes	12 min.	Ended
All My Colleagues Are Sick	Comedy	October 13, 2013	10 episodes	10–16 min.	Ended
Long for You	Romance	February 14, 2017	21 episodes	24–25 min.	Ended
Topple Your Ex Girlfriend	Comedy	October 24, 2016	31 episodes	22–30 min.	Ended
The Twilight of the Pupil	Fantasy	September 7, 2016	17 episodes	22–26 min.	Ended
Breaking Bad Forture Teller	Fantasy	April 11, 2016	40 episodes	24–27 min.	Ended
Su Ranran Zhui Fu Ji	Drama	January 17, 2016	50 episodes	22–27 min.	Ended
Personal Assistant of Female President	Drama	May 20, 2016	2 seasons, 78 episodes	24–65 min.	Ended
Chao Nei 18th	Drama	May 20, 2015	30 episodes	19–23 min.	Ended
Zodiac Formula Season 2	Drama	May 6, 2013	12 episodes	17–29 min.	Ended
Super Hero Made in China	Comedy	May 28, 2015	6 episodes	5–12 min.	Ended
Jiu Xing Tian Chen Jue	Fantasy	March 17, 2015	10 episodes	12–14 min.	Ended
Kai Xin Ma Hua Theater	Comedy	January 19, 2012	10 episodes	13–18 min.	Ended
Idol Hunter	Drama	September 23, 2016	20 episodes	22–23 min.	Ended
Campus Baskerball	Teen drama	June 29, 2016	12 episodes	19–23 min.	Ended
Secrets Of Women	Comedy/drama	June 19, 2015	12 episodes	19–31 min.	Season 2 moved to Kankan.com
Evil Minds Season 2	Crime	December 3, 2016	25 episodes	28–46 min.	Picked up from iQiyi
Online Girls	Comedy	October 9, 2015	15 episodes	21–27 min.	Ended
Ao Hun Zhi Huo Si Ren	Fantasy	May 11, 2015	10 episodes	13–18 min.	Ended
