= Faraday Future =

American car manufacturer

Faraday Future Intelligent Electric Inc.
- Traded as: Nasdaq: FFAI
- Industry: Automotive
- Founded: April 2014; 12 years ago
- Founder: Jia Yueting
- Headquarters: Los Angeles, California, El Segundo, U.S.
- Key people: Yueting "YT" Jia (CEO); Jiawei "Jerry" Wang (Global Executive Chairman); Chad Chen (Lead Independent Director)
- Revenue: US$536,000 (2025)
- Operating income: ▼US$331 million (2025)
- Net income: ▼US$397.1 million (2025)
- Total assets: US$277.9 million (2025)
- Number of employees: 288
- Subsidiaries: Faraday X
- Website: ff.com faradayfuturecn.com

Faraday Future Intelligent Electric Inc. is an American electric vehicle company founded in 2014 and headquartered in El Segundo, California. It began customer deliveries of its FF 91 luxury vehicle in 2023 but had delivered only a small number of vehicles by 2025. In 2024 and 2025 the company shifted focus to a lower-priced second brand, Faraday X, centered on the FX Super One multi-purpose vehicle, and in early 2026 it expanded into robotics.

== Embodied-AI robotics ==
In February 2026, Faraday Future introduced an embodied-AI robotics line, branded FF EAI-Robotics, at the National Automobile Dealers Association Show in Las Vegas. The initial lineup consisted of two humanoid robot series, FF Futurist and FF Master, and a quadruped robot, FX Aegis. Gadgets 360 reported starting prices of $34,990 for FF Futurist, $19,990 for FF Master, and $2,499 for FX Aegis, with the products offered for pre-order.

The company said the first batch of robotics deliveries was scheduled to begin by the end of February 2026. In April 2026, Faraday Future said the FX Aegis quadruped robot had completed U.S. compliance certification, and that Aegis units previously delivered as pilots could be converted to formal deliveries.

In its first-quarter 2026 results, Faraday Future reported revenue of $512,000 and said its EAI robotics business had begun generating revenue. The company reported that it had shipped 68 EAI robots through April 30, 2026, and raised its full-year 2026 shipment target from more than 1,000 units to more than 1,500 units.

In May 2026, Faraday Future signed a memorandum of understanding with the robotics e-commerce platform RobotShop covering distribution of its EAI robots. The company also said it was pursuing education-related initiatives around its robotics products, including an education lab and summer-camp programs.

== History ==
Faraday Future was founded by Chinese businessman Jia Yueting in May 2014 and, at the time, was headquartered in Los Angeles, California, in the Harbor Gateway neighborhood adjacent to Carson, California. From its inception in 2014, the company grew to 1,000 employees by January 2016.

The company is named for a founding principle of electric motor technology known as Faraday's law of induction, which in turn is named after English scientist Michael Faraday who discovered electromagnetic induction.

In October 2024, Faraday Future and Master Investment Group of United Arab Emirates announced a co-investment agreement to launch operational and sales activities within the UAE in 2025 and 2026.

=== Factory plans ===
Faraday Future announced in November 2015 that it would invest up to $1 billion in its first manufacturing facility.

In December 2015, Faraday Future settled on a location in North Las Vegas for its manufacturing site, to be built by AECOM for $500 million. Construction began in April 2016 on infrastructure which Nevada agreed to build, but was suspended in November pending verification of Faraday Future's financial stability. The facility was spurred by a $215 million tax incentive, and a 4-mile (6 km) railway spur in 2018 to the 300 million sq ft (28 million m^{2}) future factory with 4,500 full-time employees.

On May 24, 2016, the City of Vallejo, California, announced a May 31 Special City Council meeting to consider an exclusive negotiating agreement. This represented the first step to bring Faraday Future to Mare Island. Following Karma Automotive's new plant in Moreno Valley, the project would be the second new automobile manufacturing facility to be built from the ground up in California within the last few years. It was projected to bring hundreds of millions of dollars in new investment to the local economy. On May 31, 2016, the City Council unanimously agreed to enter the 6-month agreement.

Due to plans to develop a production vehicle and plant in North Las Vegas, Faraday Future ended its exclusive agreement with the City of Vallejo in March 2017.

On July 10, 2017, the company announced it would no longer build a plant in North Las Vegas because of financial setbacks.

In August 2017, the company announced that it had signed a lease for a former Pirelli tire plant in Hanford, California. The company said that it could employ up to 1,300 people over time and build up to 10,000 cars a year at that location.

=== Concept vehicle and other planned vehicles ===
Faraday Future originally planned to launch its first fully electric vehicle in 2017, with the possibility of producing a larger range of vehicles over time. The company has implied plans to explore other aspects of the automotive and technology industries, such as alternative ownership and usage models, in-vehicle content, and autonomous driving.

In July 2015, Motor Trend revealed tentative specifications for Faraday Future's proposed electric vehicle: it will have 15 percent higher specific energy than a Tesla Model S, it utilizes a multi cell solution where both individual cells and groups of cells can be replaced, and it will have a modular design for improved mass-production methods.

At the November 2015 LA Auto Show, former Head of Design Richard Kim discussed his interest in creating a vehicle that featured internet access, in-car entertainment, aromatherapy technology, and ergonomic interior design.

On January 4, 2016, at the US Consumer Electronics Show, Faraday Future revealed its concept vehicle, 1,000 hp (750 kW), 200 mph (320 km/h), single seat sportscar FF ZERO1. Their video demonstrated how their Variable Platform Architecture (not in the concept vehicle) would allow for many body styles and battery configurations, but specific details or production schedules were not given for these potential car designs, only outlines of a crossover-like vehicle. Following the revelation, comments on social media expressed disappointment that the only design exhibited was a high-end concept race car that would never be produced.

Faraday Future planned to begin testing self-driving vehicles on California roads after winning approval from California in June 2016.

Faraday Future unveiled its luxury model FF 91 130 kWh crossover vehicle, its first production vehicle, at the January 2017 US Consumer Electronics Show, with connected car features. Faraday received 64,124 reservations within the first 36 hours, despite a demonstration that did not go particularly well. It is claimed to accelerate 0–60 mph (0–97 km/h) in less than 2.5 seconds, costing less than $300,000. Faraday Future plans several cars based on its Variable Platform Architecture.

In April 2019, Faraday Future announced a partnership with Chinese video game company, The9, to develop a minivan named the V9, exclusively for the China market.

=== Financial struggles ===
In late 2015, the company said that part of Faraday Future's revenue stream was expected to come from alternative sources, with the anticipated revenue structure closer to that of the smartphone than to that of standard automobile sales.

By 2016, Faraday had been the subject of speculation voiced by ex-employees and government officials who expressed doubts about the company's finances. The company had failed to fund even relatively small escrow accounts, which led to some analysts doubting the company's financial solidity and overall investment strategy. In July 2016, several investment officers and managers expressed concern over the company's finances.

Faraday Future suspended work on its Nevada site in November 2016 until the first $300 million of a claimed $600 million in funding would be realized. The delay was criticized by Nevada officials, which Jia refuted. Among FF's many financial challenges as of late 2016 was providing surety for a $140 million loan when LeEco bought a $250 million piece of land in California from Yahoo.

The majority shareholder for the company was founder Jia Yueting. In late 2017, then CFO Stefan Krause and CTO Ulrich Kranz departed Faraday Future in a dispute with owner Jia over financing and the impending exhaustion of cash. Krause and Kranz founded Evelozcity (now called Canoo) in late 2017, a competing electric car maker, and poached former Faraday Future employees. Jia then took over as CEO of the company, securing a round of financing, when the company was facing depletion of their cash supply, and started paying off debts to suppliers. At the time, Jia was in debt in China, with suppliers, creditors, and government, camping out at his Chinese company LeEco. The new financing involved US$1 billion for 25% of the outstanding shares in the company. In the followup to this round of financing, Jia had reiterated that the FF91 would debut on schedule, at the end of 2018.

In early 2018, Faraday Future acquired a $1.5 billion funding commitment from an undisclosed Hong Kong investor, with $550 million invested initially and the balance coming as the company met milestones. A report indicated that the new lifeline entailed a lien on the company's assets as collateral. By April 2018, Faraday Future secured a contract to build an assembly plant in a Guangzhou free zone area dedicated to the manufacture of smart equipment and new energy vehicles.

In May 2018, the company announced the appointment of Michael Agosta as vice president of finance for North America. Agosta was the previous CFO of Ford Motor Company Middle East and Africa. The announcement was seen as a commitment on the part of the organization to follow through on Jia Yueting's promise to produce its first EV, the FF 91, by 2018. An internal email sent by Jia Yueting showed that the vehicle was nearing delivery. This confirmed Agosta's prepared statement during his appointment that said "2018 is going to be an exceptional year for FF to deliver its first FF 91 to the market, and I will lead my team to make sure we are ready for this goal and beyond."

In August 2018, Faraday Future received US$854 million from Evergrande Group for a 45% stake in the company. However, in October 2018 the company sought to call off the deal, with Jia entering arbitration with Evergrande. Also in October 2018, the company announced layoffs, a 20% salary cut for all staff, and a revised salary of $1 for Jia. Co-founder Nick Sampson and senior vice president Peter Savagian resigned from the company following the announcement of layoffs. In December 2018 the company announced massive layoffs due to a cash crunch and financial pressure, and by the end of 2018 the staff was planned to be reduced by 40% (from 1000 to 600).

In March 2019, Faraday Future announced a new 50–50 joint venture with Chinese online game operator The9 to make EVs in China, with The9 announcing it would contribute up to $600 million for the project. In May 2019 it was reported that Faraday Future was undergoing restructuring and in June the company fired dozens of employees on unpaid leave.

The company's founder Jia Yueting filed for personal bankruptcy in United States federal court in Delaware on October 14, 2019. Following Jia's personal bankruptcy, he stepped down from his role as CEO of Faraday Future in order to assume a new position as the Chief Product and User Officer (CPUO). Jia was replaced as CEO by Carsten Breitfeld - former CEO at rival electric vehicle startup Byton.

In February 2024, the lessor of the company's headquarters in Gardena, Rexford Industrial, served a Notice to Pay Rent or Quit due to unpaid rent of $917,887.26. It required the company to either pay rent or forfeit the building within 5 days. This was followed by an eviction complaint filed by the Superior Court of California.

In April and May 2026, Faraday Future announced financing transactions totaling $70 million. On April 17, 2026, the company entered into a $45 million note purchase agreement with an accredited investor, consisting of a $15.78 million promissory note (Promissory Note A-1) and a $30 million secured promissory note (Secured Promissory Note B). On May 15, 2026, the company closed a $25 million sale of senior convertible notes to institutional investors; the company said $12.5 million was transferred to its operating account, while the remaining $12.5 million was placed in an investor-controlled regulatory account to be released upon specified conditions. The company said the financing would support the first phase of its EAI robotics strategy.

=== Becoming publicly traded ===
In January 2021, Faraday Future announced that the company would go public through a reverse merger with special-purpose acquisition company Property Solutions Acquisition Corp. The combined company would be valued at US$3.4 billion. Chinese automaker Geely was expected to become a strategic partner of Faraday Future. Faraday Future was expected to set up contract manufacturing operations in China through their partnership with Geely. Taiwanese manufacturer Foxconn was expected to serve as an additional strategic partner of Faraday Future in a yet to be determined capacity.

Faraday Future was listed on the Nasdaq stock exchange on July 22, 2021, initially trading under the ticker symbol FFIE. On March 10, 2025, the company changed its ticker symbol to FFAI. In March 2026, the company disclosed that it had received a notice from Nasdaq for falling below the $1 minimum bid price and was granted a 180-day period to regain compliance.

=== SEC investigation ===
On March 31, 2022, the U.S. Securities and Exchange Commission subpoenaed several members of Faraday Future's management team over inaccurate statements made to investors. On November 26, 2022, the board voted to remove Carsten Breitfeld and appoint Xuefeng Chen as CEO.

In July 2025, the SEC sent Wells Notices to Faraday Future and several executives, indicating that staff intended to recommend an enforcement action. On March 18, 2026, the SEC's Division of Enforcement informed the company that it did not intend to recommend an enforcement action; the notice stated that it "must in no way be construed as indicating that the party has been exonerated or that no action may ultimately result from the staff's investigation."

=== Production and deliveries ===
On March 29, 2023, Faraday Future started production of the FF 91 Futurist Alliance at its Hanford facility, with the first production build vehicle coming off the line on April 14, 2023. The FF 91 Futurist is the company's first production vehicle and flagship model that is expected to be offered in both the U.S. and China markets.

On June 8, 2023, Faraday Future announced the first three owners of the FF 91 Futurist: Rem D Koolhaas, Jason Oppenheim, and Private Collection Motors (PCM), a luxury car dealership based in Costa Mesa, California.

On August 12, 2023, Faraday Future delivered its first vehicle to PCM. The company also announced that Justin Bell, a second-generation world-champion race car driver from England, had signed a sales agreement, along with a collaboration agreement that comes with the title "Developer Co-Creation Officer", during the 2023 Monterey Car Week.

On September 13, 2023, Jason Oppenheim took delivery of an FF 91 Futurist Alliance at FF's "Delivery Co-Creation Day".

On September 19, 2023, business development manager Kelvin Sherman took delivery of a FF 91 Futurist Alliance at Faraday Future‘s headquarters. The company also announced that actress and entrepreneur Emma Hernan had also joined Faraday Future as its first female FF 91 Futurist Alliance owner and "Developer Co-Creation Officer".

On October 8, 2023, FF delivered an FF 91 Futurist Alliance to Jia Yueting.

According to TechCrunch, Faraday Future delivered four vehicles in 2025 and reported a net loss of nearly $400 million for the year.

On September 28, 2025, an FF 91 prototype on display at the company's Los Angeles facility caught fire, damaging a building on the property; no injuries were reported.

=== Stock short squeeze ===
On May 15, 2024, the Faraday Future stock become a target for meme stock investors who sought to 'squeeze' the large position of short sellers in a manner similar to that of the GameStop short squeeze of 2021.

=== Pivot to second brand Faraday X ===
The company delivered a total of 16 vehicles by January 2025, and after two late-2024 funding rounds totaling about $60 million it announced a pivot toward a lower-priced second brand, Faraday X. At CES 2025, the head of Faraday X described the sub-brand as aimed at electric vehicles and plug-in hybrids priced from roughly $20,000 to $50,000, well below the FF 91.

In July 2025, Faraday Future publicly unveiled the FX Super One, a multi-purpose vehicle (described in U.S. coverage as a minivan) under the Faraday X brand. Independent reporting described the vehicle as based on the Great Wall Motor Wey Gaoshan and noted that key specifications were not initially disclosed.

In December 2025, the company said the first FX Super One pre-production vehicle had rolled off the line at its Hanford, California, facility.

In May 2026, the company paused the original 400-volt Super One program and said it was evaluating an 800-volt electric version or an extended-range "AIHER" variant, with mass production subject to securing additional financing.

== Headquarters relocation ==
In March 2026, Commercial Observer reported that Faraday Future was downsizing and relocating its headquarters from a Rexford Industrial facility in Gardena to a roughly 99,000-square-foot building at 1990 East Grand Avenue in El Segundo.

== AIxCrypto investment ==
In 2025, Faraday Future said it invested about $30 million in Qualigen as part of a $41 million PIPE transaction, gaining a majority interest in a Nasdaq-listed AI- and crypto-focused company it referred to as AIxCrypto.

== Related-party transactions ==
According to a 2026 proxy filing and reporting by TechCrunch, Faraday Future paid about $7.5 million during 2025 to FF Global Partners LLC, an entity described in company filings as an affiliate of founder Jia Yueting. The payments included monthly $100,000 consulting fees, a $2 million bonus payment, and $1.7 million in loan repayments.

== Leadership ==
Following an 8-K filed in May 2026, the company's leadership includes:

- Yueting "YT" Jia – Founder and Chief Executive Officer
- Jiawei "Jerry" Wang – Global Executive Chairman
- Chad Chen – Lead Independent Director

=== Previous CEOs ===
- YT Jia (2017–2019)
- Carsten Breitfeld (2019–2022)
- Xuefeng Chen (2022–2024)
- Matthias Aydt (Co-CEO, 2024–2026)

== Models ==
Faraday Future vehicle names begin with "FF" for Faraday Future, followed by a two-digit number. The first digit indicates the market segment of the vehicle: a 9 represents a top-line product, while lower numbers signify progressively lower-cost segments, except for 0, which indicates a special car. When spelled out as "zero," it refers to a concept car. The second digit denotes successive iterations or generations within that segment. Each element is pronounced separately, so that the FF91 is F-F-9-1 and not FF-ninety-one. By January 2025, the company sold a total of 16 vehicles.

=== FF ZERO 1 ===
FF ZERO1

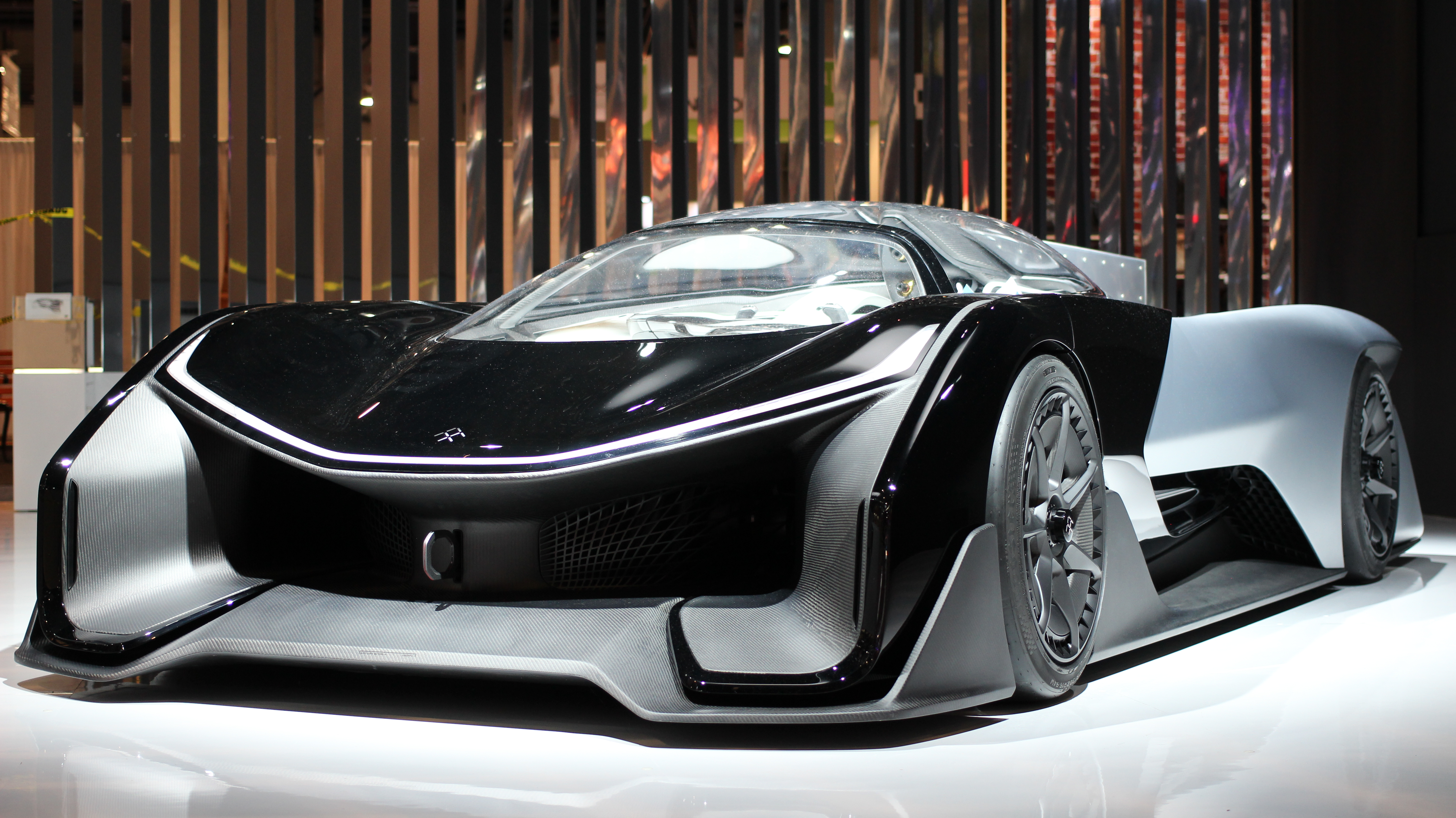
Front 3/4 view FFZERO1

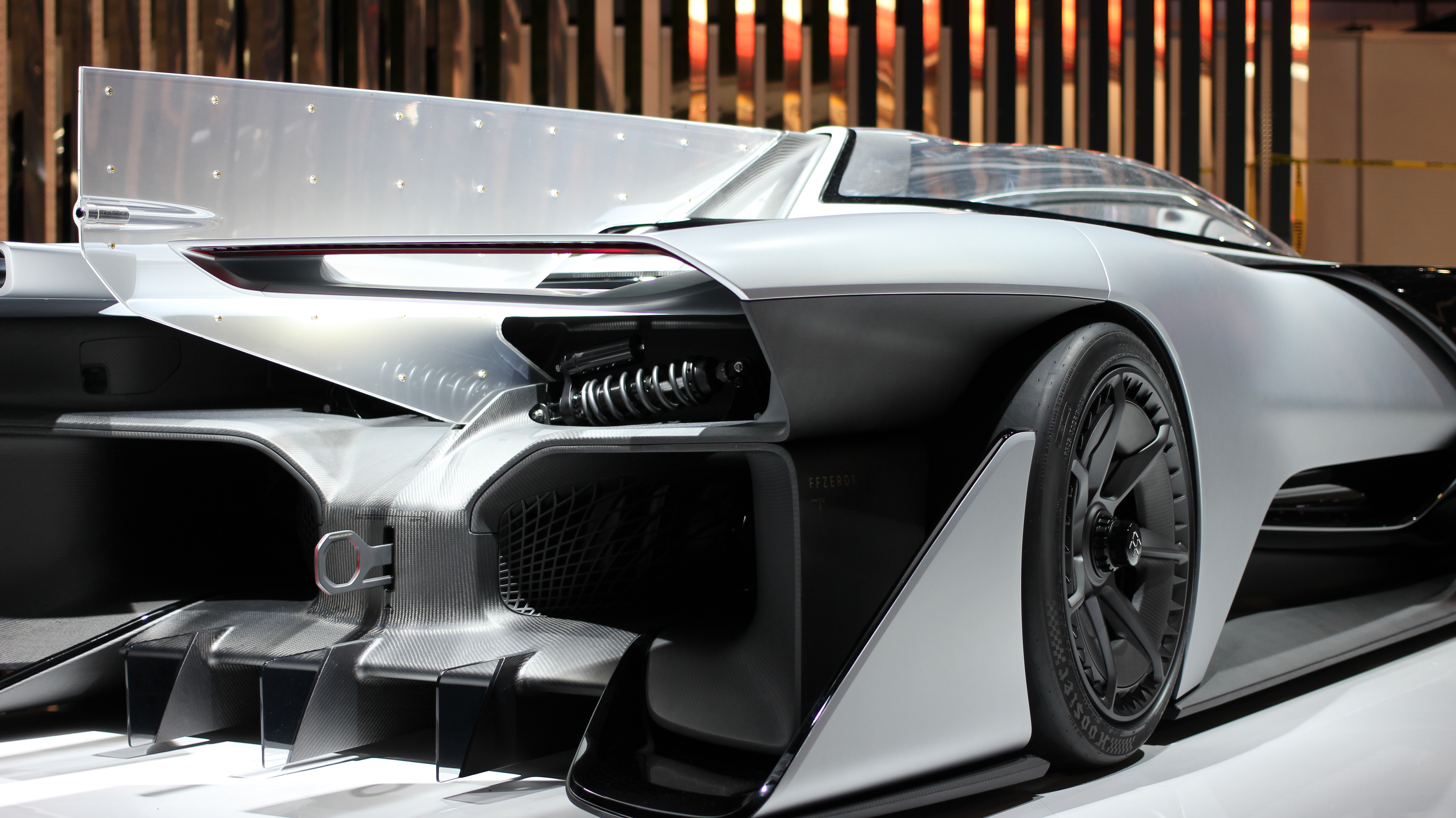
Rear 3/4 view FFZERO1

The FFZERO1 concept vehicle was unveiled in 2016, at CES. The "Zero" spelling indicates the concept vehicle status, the "1" indicates the first such model. The car was announced as having 1,000 hp (750 kW), a top speed over 200 mph (320 km/h), and a 0–60 mph (0–97 km/h) time under 3 seconds. The specifications were never validated as the vehicle was only a clay and styrofoam model. The car would have a glass roof, and a racecar style head and neck support system, with oxygen and water feeds to the driver's helmet. The car would have four electric motors, one for each wheel, and be a single seater.

=== FF 91 ===
The FF 91 (F-F-Nine-One) production model was unveiled in 2017. The "9" indicates a top-of-the-line model, analogous to the Genesis G90 or Volvo S90. The "1" indicates the first model in this market segment. This large crossover SUV is to have a 0–60 mph (0–97 km/h) time of 2.4s, 130 kWh (470 MJ) battery pack, giving a range of 289 mi (465 km). The rear doors are to be suicide doors, and all four doors would open automatically. There is a large infotainment screen in the middle of the front dash console. It would also similarly have a limited autonomous driving mode. The FF91 would be equipped with smartphone app car access and key capability and facial recognition door locks.

In August 2018, the company completed the first pre-production FF91. Production was planned to start in Hanford, California, in late 2020.

The production of the FF 91 officially started March 2023 in Hanford, California. Deliveries of the vehicle began in May 2023. The production version of the vehicle features a tri-motor configuration, providing 783 kW of total power and a 142 kWh battery pack for an estimated 381 miles (613 kilometers) of range under the US EPA standard. The pricetag of FF 91 Futurist Alliance is $309,000 US dollars, which is limited to 300 units worldwide. As of February 2024, the company announced it had delivered 11 FF 91 2.0 Futurist Alliance models to staff and selected influencers. By early 2025 several more had been delivered to customers.

=== FF 91 2.0 Futurist Alliance ===
FF 91 2.0 Futurist Alliance is the first product of Faraday Future. The FF 91 2.0 Futurist Alliance has three motors with a maximum output of 1,050 horsepower (780 kW). The electric motor torque output is 1,977 newton-meters (1,458 lb⋅ft) and wheel torque is 13,285 N⋅m (9,799 lb⋅ft). The 0–60 mph (97 km/h) acceleration speed is 2.27 seconds, with a battery pack capacity of 142 kWh, and an EPA-certified range of 381 miles (613 km). It uses an Nvidia DRIVE Orin and 2 Qualcomm 8155p SoCs, and a Super AP 5G modem. In the US, it supports AT&T, Verizon and T-Mobile with an in-car network speed of 10 Gbit/s. Additionally, the vehicle has 10+ screens with 100+ inch total display area. Deliveries of the electric vehicle were to begin in late 2022, but a delay was made by investor disputes.

=== FF 81 ===
The FF 81 was planned to be unveiled in 2018, though the expected car never happened. It was originally planned to be a mid-sized SUV built in California for the Chinese market.

In February 2022, Faraday Future signed a manufacturing deal with South Korean company Myoung Shin to build the FF81 in an ex-GM Korea factory, but no further announcements have been forthcoming.

=== 701-EV ===
The Faraday Future Dragon Racing Penske 701-EV for the 2016–2017 Formula E season, was an all-electric open-wheel open-cockpit battery-electric racecar for the Faraday Future Dragon Racing Team, a collaboration between Faraday Future and Dragon Racing, a team founded by Jay Penske.

== Motorsport ==
=== Pikes Peak International Hill Climb ===
Faraday raced a "beta level development" FF91 in the exhibition class race at the June 2017 annual Pikes Peak International Hill Climb in Colorado; the class also includes a performance-tuned Tesla Model S P100D. (In 2016, a Tesla Model S P90D set the production EV course record.)

=== Formula E ===
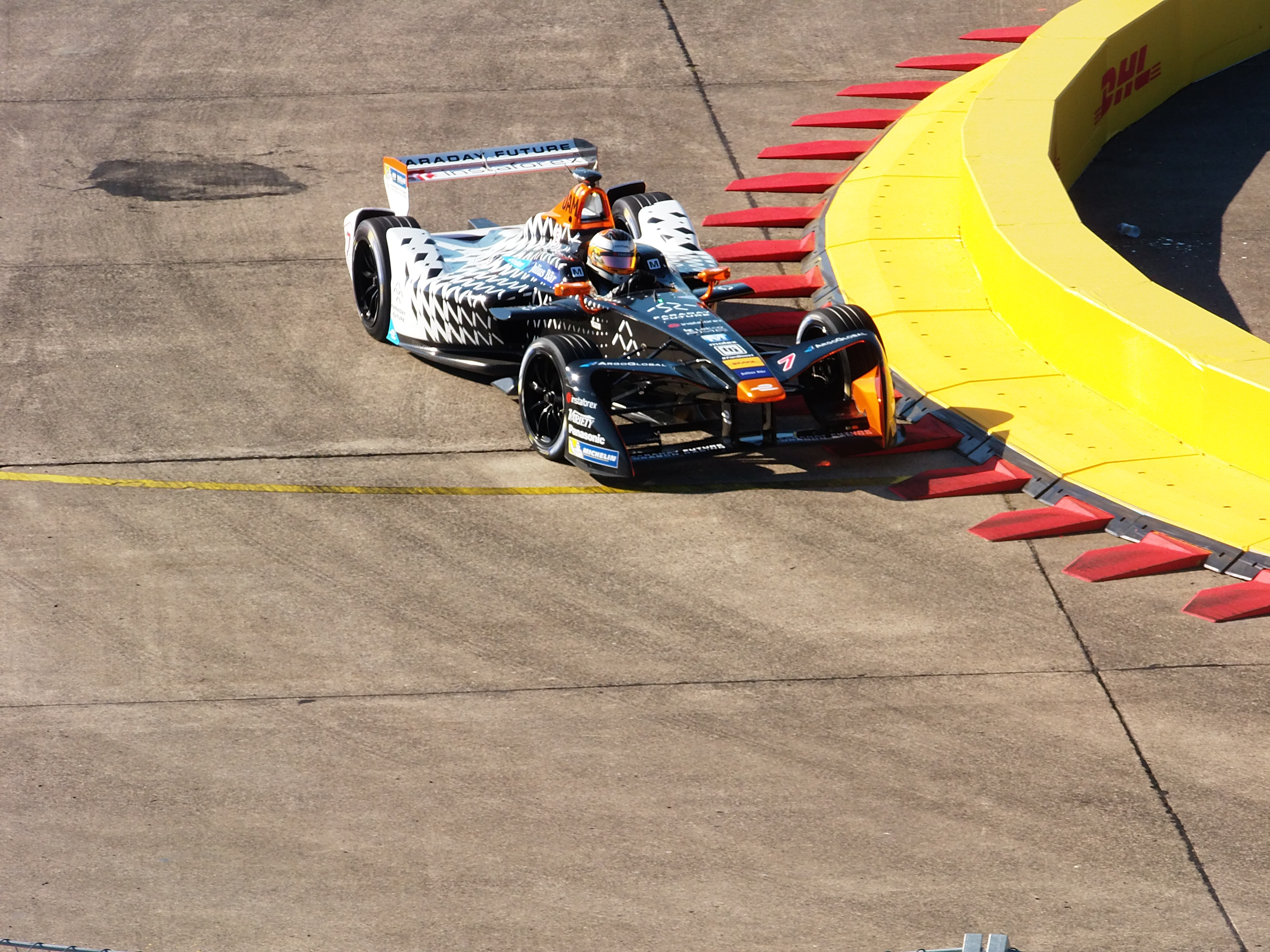
2017 FF Spark-Penske 701-EV

Faraday Future joined the FIA Formula E Championship for electric-powered cars through a collaboration with the existing Dragon Racing team for the series' third season, beginning in October 2016. Specifications for the car were released in November 2016.

In August 2017, due to a lack of cash, Faraday Future reduced its participation in Formula E. It was unable to maintain a sponsorship role in Dragon Racing, leading to the loss of the FF logo on their cars. Faraday Future said it would maintain a technical relationship with the team. By November 2017, due to its cash-strapped state, Faraday Future dropped its partnership with Dragon Racing, exiting Formula E.

== See also ==
- Plug-in electric vehicles in the United States
- Tesla, Inc.
- Fisker Inc.
- Karma Automotive
- Lucid Motors
- Rivian
