= Le.com =

Chinese technology company

Leshi Internet Information and Technology Corp. Beijing
- Trade name: Le.com; LeTV
- Type: Unlisted public company (formerly listed)
- Traded as: SZSE: 300104 (formerly)
- Founded: November 2004; 21 years ago
- Founder: Jia Yueting
- Headquarters: Chaoyang District, Beijing, China
- Area served: China
- Services: Streaming media
Owner
| Jia Yueting | (23.07%) |
| Jia Yuemin | (1.6%) |
| LeEco | (0.6%) |
| Sunac China | (8.56%) |
- Subsidiaries: Leshi Zhixin (former, now associate company)

Chinese name
- Simplified Chinese: 乐视网信息技术（北京）股份有限公司
- Traditional Chinese: 樂視網信息技術（北京）股份有限公司
- Literal meaning: Leshi Web Information Technology (Beijing), Company Limited by Shares
Transcriptions
Standard Mandarin
- Hanyu Pinyin: Lèshì Wǎng Xìnxī Jìshù (Běijīng) Gǔfèn Yǒuxiàn Gōngsī

Le.com (Chinese: 乐视网; pinyin: Lèshì Wǎng), known legally as Leshi Internet Information and Technology Corp., Beijing, is a Chinese technology company, and one of the largest online video companies in China. It is headquartered in Chaoyang District, Beijing.

Leshi Internet formerly did business as LeTV in English instead of Le.com. However, Leshi Internet still operates the brand Leshi Video in Chinese (Chinese: 乐视视频; pinyin: Lèshì Shìpín).

== History ==
Previous Leshi Internet logo, used until January 2016

Jia Yueting founded Letv.com in 2004. It was subsequently listed as a Chinese national high-tech enterprise and went public on the Shenzhen Stock Exchange on 12 August 2010. Le.com claims to be the world's first IPO company in its sector. As of 2015, the company claimed a market capitalization of $12 billion.

On 5 December 2015, Le.com announced that the listed company would acquire Le Vision Pictures from LeEco, a holding company majority owned by the largest shareholder, founder and chairman of Le.com, Jia Yueting, subject to the approval of the shareholders of the listed company. As at 8 November 2016, the deal has not been completed.

As of 31 December 2015, chairman Jia Yueting and his elder sister Jia Yuefang (Chinese: 贾跃芳) had pledged 630,994,920 shares of Le.com, which they owned just 782,545,454 shares in total (including shares held by LeEco). By percentage, they owned approximately 42.2% of the total share capital, but 80.6% of them were pledged. At the same time, Le.com borrowed CN¥3.472 billion from the Jia family. (Although Le.com also had CN¥10.84 million receivable from LeEco, and CN¥74.33 million payable to Le Vision Pictures.) The leverage of Le.com had made some media worried the financial health of both Le.com and Jia's privately owned LeEco. During 2016, Le.com also recapitalized by some private equity funds; former subsidiary LeSports was also recapitalized in 2015, making the stake held by Le.com, was diluted to just 10.34% stake.

On 13 January 2017 Sunac China, via a China-incorporated company Tianjin Jiarui Huixi (天津嘉睿汇鑫企业管理) as a proxy for the Caymans-incorporated listed company, bought 8.61% stake of Le.com from Jia Yueting, for approximately CN¥6.041 billion (CN¥35.39 per share). After the deal, Jia Yueting owned 25.84% shares of Le.com (additional 0.6% was owned via LeEco), while Tianjin Jiarui owned 8.61% stake as the second-largest shareholder. In a separate deal, Tianjin Jiarui bought 15% stake of Le Vision Pictures from LeEco. In a third deal, Tianjin Jiarui acquired part of the stake of Leshi Zhixin from Le.com and a minority shareholder, for CN¥2.302 billion and CN¥2.648 billion, respectively. After the deals, Le.com would still be the largest shareholder of Leshi Zhixin, but for 40.31% only, followed by Tianjin Jiarui for 33.5% and LeEco for 18.38%. In September 2018, Tianjin Jiarui also acquired additional stakes of Le Vision Pictures and Lerong Zhixin (Chinese: 乐融致新; pinyin: Lèróng Zhìxīn; former Leshi Zhixin) from Jia's private company LeEco. The stakes were auctioned by the liquidator of LeEco. Despite the stake that held by Le.com was unchanged at 36.4046%, Tianjin Jiarui suppressed Le.com as the largest shareholder (46.0507%) of Lerong Zhixin.

In February 2017 Le.com formed an agreement with a supplier Truly International Holdings for capital increase. Truly would own 2.3438% stake in Leshi Zhixin for CN¥720 million. However, in August Truly sued Leshi Zhixin in civil court in order to recover a paid-in investment of CN¥240 million, claiming the terms of the investment agreement had been breached.

In July 2017 Jia Yueting resigned as the chairman and CEO.

In July 2018, Leshi announced that it was at risk of being suspended from the Shenzhen Stock Exchange due to negative net assets. In April 2019, the company announced that they received a legal notice from a local arbitration chamber that requesting the company and sister companies such as LeSports, etc., to refund CN¥1.4 billion in total to two investment managers: a limited company 深圳市平银能矿投资管理 for CN¥1.335 billion and a limited partnership 嘉兴华启一期投资管理合伙企业 for CN¥65.00 million, respectively.

On 14 May 2020, Le.com was delisted by the exchange.

On 28 January 2021, the former CEO of LeTV posted that he will be ready to return to China.

== Products and services ==
=== Video streaming service ===
Le.com's video streaming service currently offers over 100,000 episodes of TV dramas and over 5,000 movie titles. The site draws an estimated 250 million pageviews per day, 350 million users per month, 100 million daily content viewers on mobile devices, and 10 million daily content viewers on large-screen TVs.

One of the most popular shows on Le.com's service has been the Go Princess Go series.

Le.com's online video streaming service has been receiving positive response in China. While Le.com mainly focuses on TV and movie streaming, its LIVE and LeVidi services focus on live broadcasting and short videos from YouTube and other content providers, respectively.

For its streaming service in the United States, Le.com partners with content providers Machinima Inc., Tastemade, Seeso, and Indieflix, among others. Its services Le, LeVidi, and LIVE are often marketed collectively as EcoPass.

=== Flat-screen TV ===
Le.com produced flat-screen smart TV via a non-wholly owned subsidiary Leshi Zhixin (Chinese: 乐视致新; pinyin: Lèshì zhìxīn). The subsidiary also owned a minor stake (20.09%) in TCL Multimedia, a subsidiary of TCL Corporation for 52.1% stake.

=== LeCloud ===
LeCloud, previously Letv Cloud, invented the VaaS (Video-as-a-Service) model in 2014, similar to other "as a service" technologies like IaaS, PaaS, and SaaS. VaaS model is based on cloud computing, big data, and video technologies. It is founded on Internet-wide content aggregation, combining aggregation, distribution and derivative capabilities.

The LeCloud team and Microsoft jointly held a press conference in Beijing in May 2015 and announced that the two parties have agreed to a deal for solution compatibility with Microsoft Azure.

== See also ==
- List of Le original programming
