= LeSports =

Video streaming company

LeSports (Chinese: 乐视体育; pinyin: lèshì tǐyù) is a company that Le.com owned 10.34% stake. Established in 2014, Letv Sports Culture Develop Ltd. has raised CN¥800 million in tranche A funding, valuing the video-streaming business at CN¥2.8 billion, setting some new records in funding capital and expected market value.

LeSports became title sponsor of the Beijing Wukesong Culture & Sports Center in 2016.
