= Hangzhou Bay New Zone =

Area of Cixi, Ningbo, China

Hangzhou Bay New Zone (simplified Chinese: 杭州湾新区; traditional Chinese: 杭州灣新區; pinyin: Hángzhōuwān Xīnqū) or Hangzhou Bay New Area is a development area in Cixi, Ningbo, Zhejiang province, China.

== History ==
The government of Ningbo decided to set up the new area for economic development in 2001. The area is also known by a number of names such as The Zhejiang Cixi Export Processing Zone or the Hangzhou Bay New Zone.

The economic development district is administered by the Zhejiang Cixi Economic Development Zone Administrator Committee which itself is subordinated to the Ningbo municipal government.

The development zone represents a strategic location in the southern tip of the Yangtze River Delta Economic Zone which is the manufacturing heartland of the region. It is also strategically near the emerging Chinese financial centre Shanghai, and manufacturing hubs of Suzhou and Hangzhou.

== Transport ==
The hub is served by the Hangzhou Bay Bridge which opened in 2008. The bridge reduces the time from Shanghai to Ningbo from four hours to about two hours. The authorities are planning the construction another bridge to speed up economic development in the region.

It is also close to the two major deep water ports of Shanghai, Yangshan and the Port of Ningbo. Both major cities are within two hours by road.
