= Sun Hongbin =

Chinese billionaire real estate developer

- Born: 1963 (age 62–63); Linyi, Shanxi, China
- Citizenship: United States
- Education: Wuhan Water Conservancy and Electric Power College (UG); Tsinghua University (MEng)
- Occupation: Businessman
- Known for: Founder, chairman and majority owner of Sunac
- Spouse: Married
- Children: 2

Sun Hongbin (Chinese: 孙宏斌; born 1963) is a Chinese-American businessman. He is the founder, chairman, and majority owner of Sunac.

== Early life ==
Sun was born in Shanxi province in 1963.

Sun received his undergraduate education at the Wuhan Water Conservancy and Electric Power College (which merged into Wuhan University in 2000) and graduated in 1981. He earned a Master of Engineering from Tsinghua University in 1985. Sun also attended a six-week advanced management program at Harvard Business School in 2000.

== Career ==
Sun is the chairman and majority shareholder of Sunac, the Chinese property group.

In 1992, he was jailed in China following an embezzlement conviction which was later overturned.

In October 2017 he was ordered to do "26 hours of re-education in corporate governance" after being censured for having broken the listing rules of the Hong Kong Stock Exchange.

== Personal life ==
Sun has citizenship of the United States, and lives in Tianjin, China. He is married with two children.
