= Truly International Holdings =

Truly Semiconductors Ltd 信利半導體有限公司
- Company type: Public
- Traded as: SEHK: 732
- Industry: LCD
- Founded: 1991
- Headquarters: Hong Kong
- Key people: Lam Wai Wah Steven (Chairman and CEO)
- Revenue: US$2.7 billion (2014)
- Number of employees: 35,000
- Website: truly.com.hk

Truly Semiconductors Ltd (Chinese: 信利半導體有限公司; pinyin: Xìnlì bàndǎotǐ yǒuxiàn gōngsī) is a company producing LCD panels and modules, established in 1991 with its headquarters in Hong Kong and manufacturing grounds in Shanwei, Guangdong, China.

== Overview ==
Truly Semiconductors Ltd manufactures LCDs, in panel, module, compact camera modules and touch panels for different industries like Automotive, Medical, Industrial, Defense, telecommunication etc...
