= Sunac =

Chinese property developer

Sunac China Holdings Limited
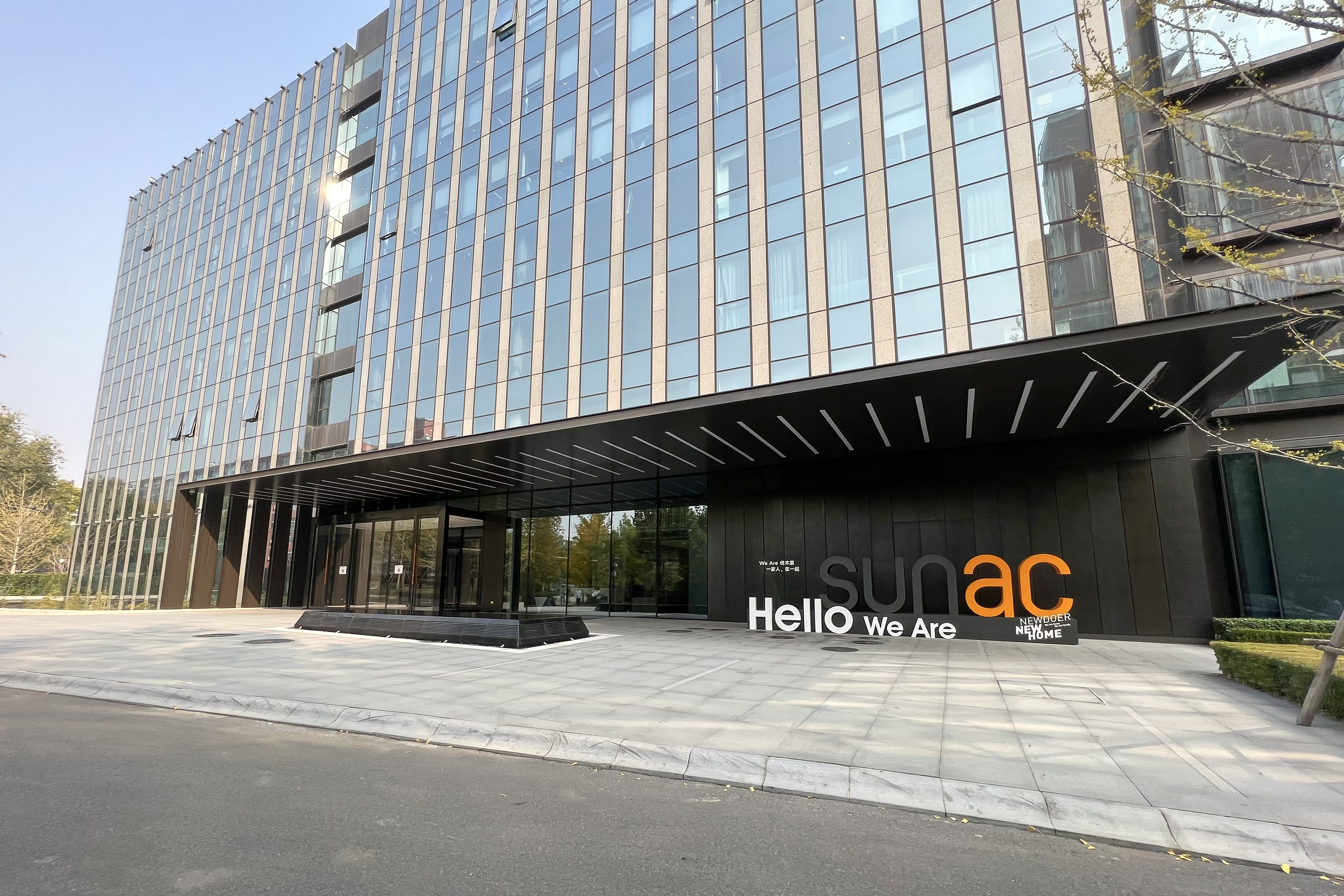
- Headquarters entrance at One Central, Dongzhimen, Beijing, China
- Native name: 融创中国控股有限公司
- Company type: public
- Traded as: SEHK: 1918
- Industry: Real estate
- Founded: 2003
- Founder: Sun Hongbin
- Number of locations: Beijing, China (general office 1); Tianjin, China (general office 2); Cayman Islands (registered office)
- Area served: China
- Key people: Sun Hongbin (Chairman)
- Number of employees: 24,105

Chinese name
- Simplified Chinese: 融创中国控股有限公司
- Traditional Chinese: 融創中國控股有限公司
Transcriptions
- Website: sunac.com.cn

Sunac China Holdings Limited, or Sunac (Chinese: 融创; pinyin: Róngchuàng), is a major property developer headquartered in Tianjin, China. The company focuses on large-scale, medium to high-end property developments. It does not only focus on its home market of Tianjin, but also has operations in Beijing, Chongqing, Wuxi and other cities.

In July 2017, Sunac reached a $9.3 billion deal to buy Dalian Wanda's tourism projects and hotels, forming the second-biggest real estate deal ever in China at the time.

== History ==
Sunac was founded in 2003 in Tianjin by Sun Hongbin, previously the founder, chairman, and CEO of Sunac Group. It was listed on the Hong Kong stock exchange on 7 October 2010 with the IPO price of HK$3.48 per share.

In July 2017, Sunac acquired 13 tourism projects from Dalian Wanda for US$6.6 billion. The Company also acquired a stake in Chinese streaming service le.com in 2017.

In March 2020, the Company reported profits of $3.7 billion in 2019, an increase of 57% from the previous year.

In April 2022, Sunac was among stocks that were suspended from trading after missing the deadline to report annual results, due to the 2021-2023 Chinese property sector crisis.

In September 2023, Sunac filed a petition for recognition under Chapter 15 of the United States Bankruptcy Code. In December 2023, the Court entered an order closing the Chapter 15 case.

In November 2023, Sunac announced that it has completed its holistic offshore debt restructuring.

In January 2025, China Cinda (HK) Asset Management filed a winding-up petition over Sunac's failure to repay a loan of US$30 million. In January 2026, Sunac announced that the winding-up petition has been dismissed.

In December 2025, Sunac announced that it has completed its second round of holistic offshore debt restructuring. The completion of the restructuring has thoroughly resolved the Company’s debt risks, achieving a sustainable capital structure. Furthermore, through the implementation of the Shareholding Structure Stability Arrangement and the ESOP, confidence among all stakeholders in the Group has been further strengthened. This will contribute to better advancing various tasks such as the mitigation of debt risks associated with onshore real estate projects and the revitalization of assets in the future, supporting the gradual recovery of the long-term credit profile and operations of the Group’s real estate development segment.

== Corporate affairs ==
The company has an office in Rongke Wangjing Center in Chaoyang District, Beijing, and one in Magnetic Plaza (奥城商业广场) in Nankai District, Tianjin.
