= Tarjei Sandvik Moe =

Norwegian actor (born 1999)

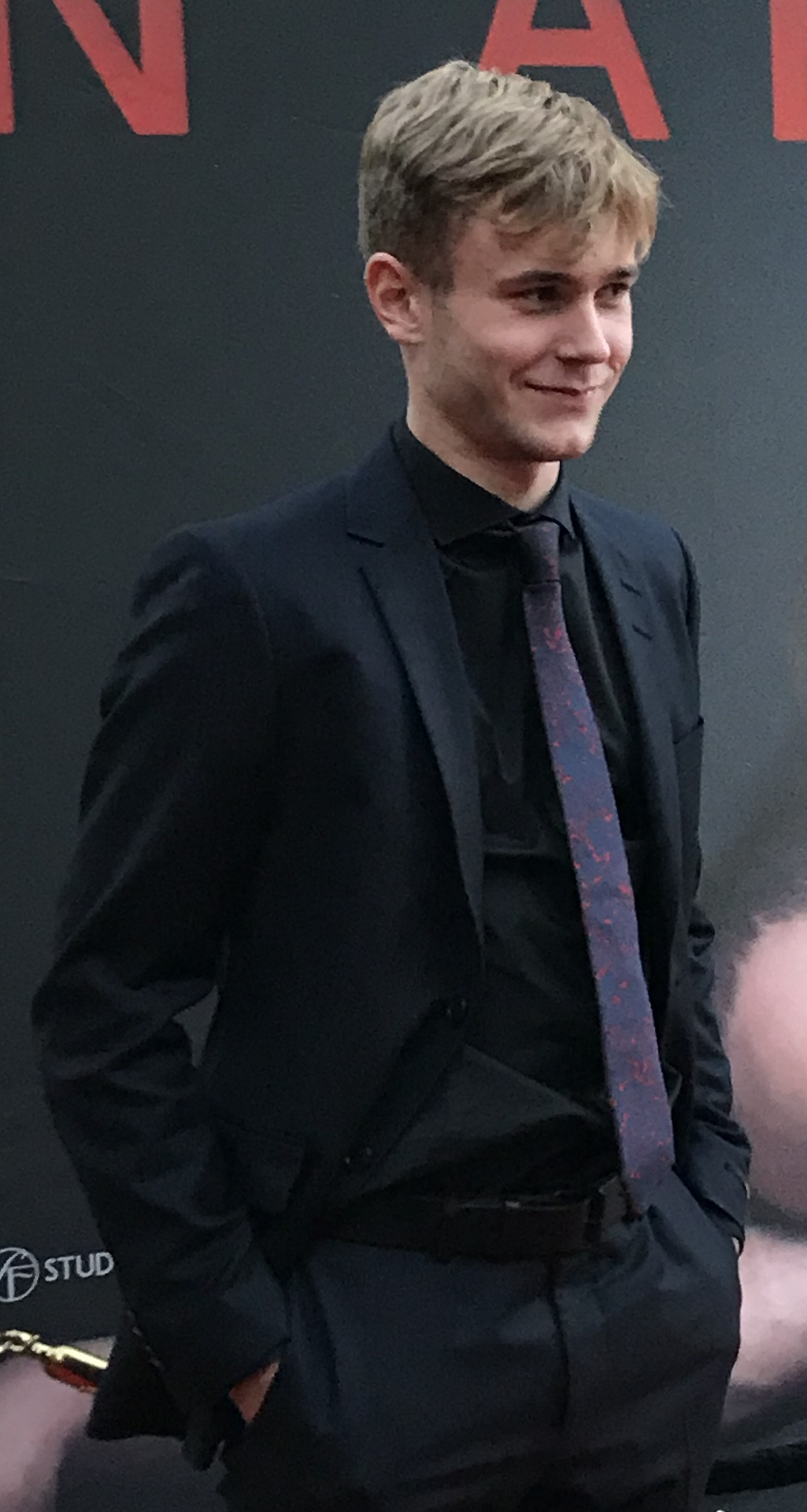
- Moe at the 2018 Oslo premiere of En affære
- Born: 24 May 1999 (age 27); Oslo, Norway
- Occupation: Actor
- Years active: 2015–present
- Awards: Gullruten Audience Award (2017)
- Website: agentfirman.com/client/tarjei-sandvik-moe

Tarjei Sandvik Moe (born 24 May 1999) is a Norwegian actor. He rose to fame with his portrayal of Isak Valtersen, the main character in the third season of Norwegian teen drama series Skam. His acting, and the third season of the series as a whole, received widespread critical acclaim for a non-stereotypical display of homosexuality, and resulted in him and co-star Henrik Holm winning two prestigious Norwegian awards.

Following the conclusion of Skam, Moe performed in the Norwegian theater adaptation of Grease and appeared in the 2018 erotic thriller film En affære (NO).

== Career ==
Tarjei Sandvik Moe portrayed Isak Valtersen in the Norwegian teen drama series Skam (2015-2017), appearing in all four seasons of the series, but receiving prominence as the main character in the third season. The season, as well as his character, received widespread acclaim for showing homosexual love without resorting to stereotypical presentations of storylines or personalities, and caused the series to become a global phenomenon, with international viewers following the series through unofficial translations on social media.

For his portrayal of the character, Sandvik Moe was nominated for "Best Actor" at the 2017 Gullruten awards, an annual Norwegian awards ceremony for the country's TV industry. Although he lost in that category, he nevertheless won two other major awards; the "Audience Award", shared along with co-star Henrik Holm, and "TV Moment of the Year", for the final scene in the penultimate episode of the third season. At the awards ceremony, the two men also made headlines in Norway for a spontaneous kiss on live television during a "kiss cam" moment, despite the fact that the event was not coordinated with the actors beforehand. The producer of the awards ceremony did not intend to force the actors to kiss, planning instead of making the award hosts humorously say that "we've seen it before" and make the camera pan out. Sandvik Moe and Holm told Norwegian press afterwards that they did not expect it, but described the scenario as "we're used to it", with reference to kissing as a frequently requested activity between them at parties they'd both attended in the past.

Sandvik Moe also appeared at Oslo Pride on 1 July 2017, with Skam co-star Carl Martin Eggesbø and producer Marianne Furevold-Boland, to accept the "Fryd" award for persons or organizations that break the norms in gender and sexuality in a positive manner. In February 2018, Moe, together with Iman Meskini, another co-star from the series, were invited to the Royal Palace for dinner, and had the opportunity meeting the Duke and Duchess of Cambridge, Prince William and Catherine, Duchess of Cambridge. Prince William and Catherine visited the school where Skam was filmed, where they discussed the impact of the TV show for people around the world with more members of the series' cast.

In June 2017, Sandvik Moe was announced as playing the character Doody in a Norwegian theater adaptation of Grease, which premiered in January 2018. The following month, he landed a role in the 2018 feature film An Affair, an erotic thriller centering on a teacher having an affair with a student. Also in August, Moe was the presenter for the Best Actress award at Norway's annual film awards, Amandaprisen, and was presenter of the announcement of nominees for the 2017 Nordic Council Film Prize.

== Personal life ==
Sandvik Moe attended the Norwegian school Hartvig Nissen.

In September 2018, Sandvik Moe guest-starred on the Norwegian talk show Senkveld and was asked about his decision to not disclose his sexual orientation to the public. He responded that his sexuality is a "private matter" and further elaborated: "A human is much more than their sexual orientation. I don't want there to be any big headlines that 'he's hetero' or 'he's gay' or anything like that. I am an actor, that's what I am. So that's what I'm trying to focus on, and that's why it's not important for me to put any focus on whether I like boys or girls".

== Filmography ==
=== Film and television ===
Year	Title	Role	Notes
2015–2017	Skam	Isak Valtersen	TV series
2017	Melk	Tinder guy	TV series
2017	The Emoji Movie	Alex	Norwegian dub
2018	En affære	Markus	
2019	Strømmeland	Himself	Comedy TV series
2019	On/Off		Short film. Alternative title: The Boyfriend Experience
2019	Skitten Snø	Nicolas	TV series
2020	Vi Burde Ha Vært På Film	Alvin	Short film. Script written by Tarjei.
2020	Gledelig Jul	Petter	
2021	Maxitaxi Driver	Johannes	TV series
2021	Hemale Education	Alvin	Short film
2022	Possession	Oscar Smith	
2023	Royalteen: Princess Margrethe	TÖS	
2023	Furia	Tarje	TV series

=== Theater ===
Year	Title	Role	Notes
2016	What Would Jesus Do		Antiteateret
2017	Det Går Bra		Antiteateret
2018	Grease	Doody	Chateau Neuf
2018	Nyanser Av Gris	Milan	Antiteateret
2018	Fru Guri av Edøy	Halvard	Smøla
2018	Snøfall	Håkon	Oslo Nye Teater
2019	En sporvogn til begjær		Oslo Nye Teater
2019	Min briljante venninne	Alfonso, Peppe, Dario	Oslo Nye Teater
2019	Snøfall	Håkon	Oslo Nye Teater
2020	Til Ungdommen		Oslo Nye Teater
2021	20. November	Sebastian Bosse	Oslo Nye Teater
