= Josefine Frida Pettersen =

Norwegian actress (born 1996)

- Born: 18 May 1996 (age 28); Sigdal, Norway
- Occupation: Actress
- Years active: 2014–present

Josefine Frida Pettersen (born 18 May 1996) is a Norwegian actress. She is best known for the role of Noora in the TV series Skam. Pettersen is from Sigdal.

She made her television debut in the TVNorge series Next Summer, but she has acquired fame for playing the role of Noora Amalie Sætre in Skam, which got her nominated in the 2016 Gullruten Awards in the Publikumsprisen category.

== Filmography ==
=== Film ===
Year	Title	Role
2019	Disco	Mirjam

=== Television ===
Year	Title	Role
2014–2015	Neste Sommer	Chairman's daughter
2015–2017	Skam	Noora Amalie Sætre
2021	Førstegangstjenesten	Aurora
2022	Dopamin	Ida

=== Theatre ===
Year	Title	Role
2017	Robin Hood - Rai Rai i Sherwood	Samantha
