= Oslo Pride =

Annual pride parade in Oslo, Norway

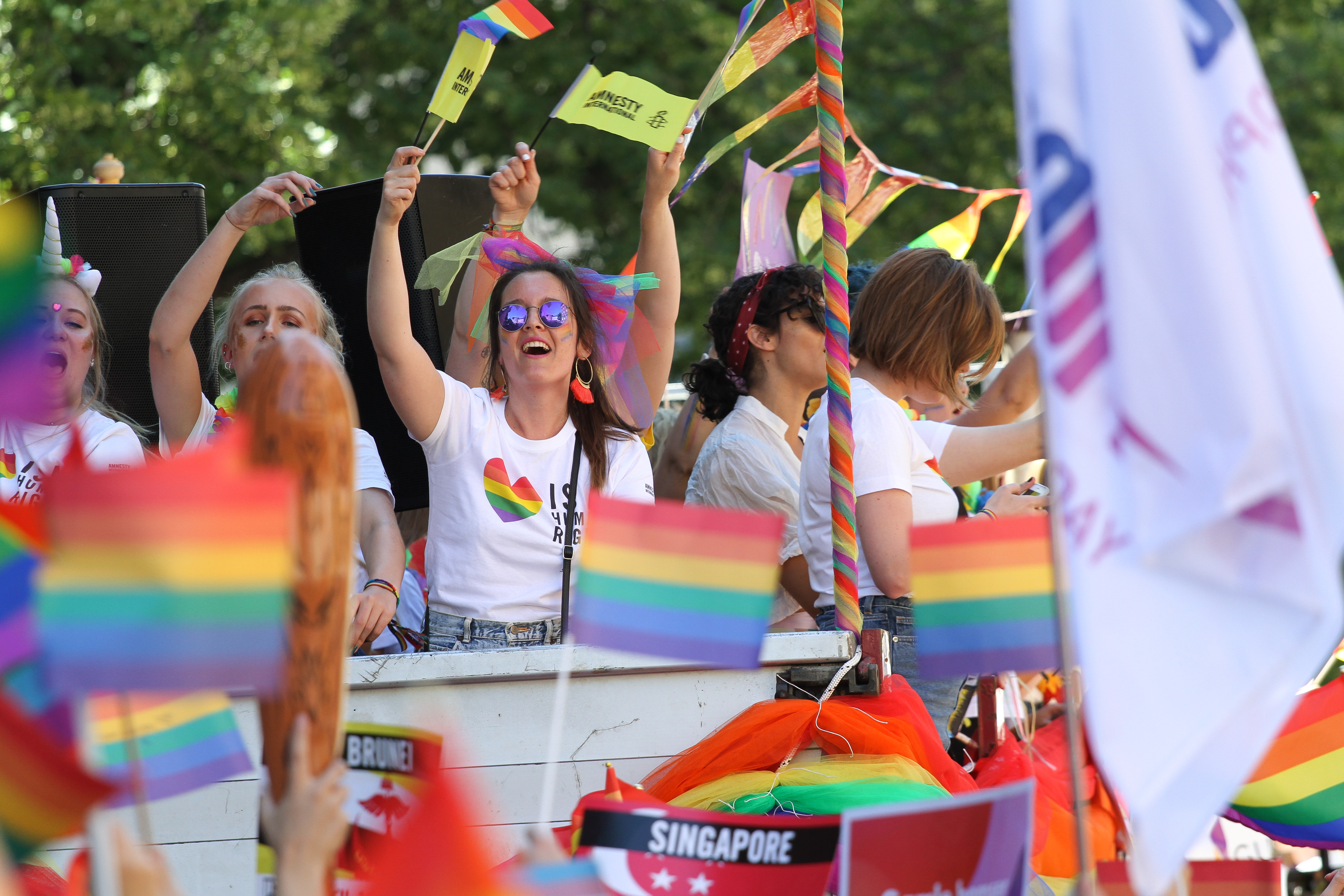
- Oslo Pride Parade in Oslo city center
- Genre: Pride festival
- Date: Latter half of June every year
- Location: Oslo city center
- Organizer: Fri Oslo and Viken

Oslo Pride is a festival and cultural event held annually in Oslo during the latter half of June. The festival welcomes everyone who supports or feels connected to the LGBTI+ community, including lesbians, gays, bisexuals, transgender people, and Intersex individuals.

Organized by Fri Oslo and Viken, Oslo Pride is Norway's largest pride festival, attracting approximately 450,000 visitors and participants over the course of its ten-day run. The program features seminars, film festivals, concerts, art exhibitions, performances, political debates, and a dedicated festival area at Kontraskjæret near Akershus Fortress.

The largest and most visible event of the festival is the Pride Parade, held on the final day. In recent years, the parade has drawn around 50,000 participants. In 2026, the number was estimated to be 90,000 participants.

== About the Festival ==
The festival's history dates back to June 27, 1974, when a group of queer activists organized the first public commemoration of the Stonewall uprising. The gathering brought together 250 people at University Square in Oslo. The first official event with a parade was held in 1982, and since then, the festival has steadily grown in scope. During the 1990s, it expanded into a ten-day program featuring seminars, lectures, debates, concerts, and parties across various venues in Oslo.

Oslo Pride consists of several key events: Pride Park, Pride House, Mini Pride, the Pride Parade, and the Oslo Pride Business Forum. Pride Park serves as the main hub of the festival and is constructed at Kontraskjæret. The park includes four stages (Main Stage, Bear Stage, Culture Stage, and Studio 72), along with bars, food vendors, and booths from various interest groups and partners of Oslo Pride. In 2023, the park was relocated to Kontraskjæret to expand both audience capacity and festival content. In 2024, the park was temporarily moved to Sofienberg Park as Kontraskjæret was rented out for a football event, but the festival will return to Kontraskjæret from 2025. Previously, Pride Park was held at City Hall Square (2013–2014) and Spikersuppa (2015–2022). In 2023, Mini Pride was hosted in the courtyard of Myntgata 2, Pride House was held at the House of Doctors, and the Oslo Pride Business Forum took place at Clarion Hotel Bjørvika.

According to the organizers, Oslo Pride attracted approximately 450,000 participants and visitors over the ten days of the festival in 2019.

The entire festival is planned and run by volunteers, including around 100 year-round volunteers and 450 more during the festival itself. As of 2023, the general manager of Oslo Pride is Dan Bjørke. The festival is owned by Fri Oslo og Viken, the regional branch of the national organization for gender and sexual diversity.

In 2020, the physical festival was canceled and instead held as a digital event due to the coronavirus pandemic. For the same reason, the 2021 festival was organized with cohort divisions and a limited number of attendees allowed in Pride Park at any given time.

=== Pride Parade ===
The largest single event during the festival is the parade, which takes place on the final Saturday. The parade begins on Grønlandsleiret and moves through Grønland, around Oslo City, via Kirkeristen, Stortorvet, Grensen, and Rosenkrantz' gate before ending on Karl Johans gate and at the festival area in Spikersuppa.

The parade brings together participants—both queer and heterosexual—from a wide range of businesses, associations, organizations, political parties, and government agencies. According to the organizers, the parade gathers around 50,000 participants, with up to 300,000 spectators lining the streets of downtown Oslo.

In 2020, the COVID-19 pandemic led to the parade being cancelled for the first time. As a replacement, a multi-hour digital parade show was produced as part of the festival's broader online program. Adam Schjølberg, Else Kåss Furuseth, and Frida Marida hosted the live-streamed event.

In 2024, Pride Park was temporarily relocated to Sofienberg Park, which led to an alternative route for the parade. That year, the parade began at Grønlandsleiret and continued through Grønland to Kirkeristen, then followed Storgata and Thorvald Meyers Gate before concluding at Sofienberg Park. Organizers estimated around 70,000 participants that year.

== History ==
The event was established as a gay pride festival organized by what was then LLH Oslo and Akershus in 1982. In its early years, the festival was known as Homodagene ("The Gay Days"), and later as Skeive dager ("Queer Days") before adopting its current name in 2014.

Oslo has served as the host city for the international pride event EuroPride on two occasions: first in 2005 and again in 2014.

== The Fryd Award and the Honorary Award ==
The Fryd Award, formerly known as the Homofryd Award, is an annual prize presented to one or more individuals, businesses, or organizations that have made a significant and positive contribution over the past year to the fight for the rights of gay, lesbian, bisexual, and transgender people. The award has been presented regularly since the early 1980s.

The Honorary Award, formerly known as Honorary Gay of the Year, is presented to an individual, group, or organization that has made an outstanding contribution to improving the status of queer people in Norwegian society. The award has been presented since 1992.

Together, the Fryd Award and the Honorary Award are considered the most prestigious honors within Norway's LGBTQ+ movement. Both are awarded during Oslo Pride.

=== Fryd Award ===
Year	Recipients
2024	Remi Johansen Hovda
2023	The support group for the June 25 Oslo mass shooting
2022	Lise Klaveness
2021	The Patient Organization for Gender Incongruence (PKI)
2020	The Snapchat and Instagram account Hverdagsskeiv
2019	The Health Center for Gender and Sexuality
2018	Kari Veiteberg
2017	Skam (TV series), including its actors and creator Julie Andem
2016	Self-Help for Immigrants and Refugees (SEIF)
2015	Skeivt arkiv (The Queer Archive)
2014	Amnesty International Norway
2013	Svolvær Parish
2012	Kristin Halvorsen
2011	Akershus Football Association
2010	The documentary series Jentene på Toten and its participants
2009	Norwegian Confederation of Trade Unions (LO)
2008	Magnhild Meltveit Kleppa
2007	The Natural History Museum (Oslo) for the exhibition Against Nature?
2006	Bishop Rosemarie Köhn
2005	The Council of the Oslo Diocese
2004	Wenche Foss
2003	Gry Jannicke "J-Diva" Jarlum
2002	Shabana Rehman
2001	Karita Bekkemellem
2000	Crown Prince Haakon
1999	Elisabeth Ohlson
1998	Unknown
1997	Simon Flem Devold
1996	Leo Burnett Advertising Agency
1995	Karol Svanøe and Halvor Moxnes
1994	Tronsmo Bookstore
1993	NRK's U editorial team, represented by Tonje Steinsland
1992	Berit Aalborg
1991	Trond Jensrud and Jan Erik Fåne
1990	Unknown
1989	Else Myklebust
1988	Kirkens Bymisjon in Oslo
1987	Ritha Jørgensen and Roy Larsen
1986	Fredrik Mellbye
1985	Yngve Horn and Wenche Lowzow
1984	The Parents’ Group for Parents of LGBTQ+ Individuals
1983	Unknown
1982	Unknown

=== Honorary Award ===
Year	Recipients
2024	Skeiv Ungdom and Aasmund Robert Vik
2023	Skeivt Art and Culture Center (SKOKS)
2022	Arne Kielland (posthumously)
2021	Oslo Fagottkor
2020	Guro Sibeko
2019	Reidar Engesbak
2018	HivNorge
2017	Esben Esther Pirelli Benestad
2016	Kim Fangen
2015	Luca Dalen Espseth
2014	Blikk
2013	Susanne Demou Øvergaard, Secretary General of Skeiv Verden
2012	Hanne Børke-Fykse at Rosa Kompetanse
2011	Svein Fuglestad, Cultural Leader at Aksept
2010	Kari Folvik
2009	André Oktay Dahl and Anette Trettebergstuen
2008	Kjell Erik Øie
2007	Erling Lae
2006	Gaysir
2005	Rolf Angeltvedt of the Health Committee for Better Gay Health
2004	Open Church Group
2003	Svein Skeid
2002	The Virus Group
2001	Sissel Hansen and Marianne Larsen of the venue Potpurriet
2000	Brita Møystad Engseth
1999	Arne Walderhaug
1998	Turid Eikvam
1997	The Gay Film Club Skeive Filmer
1996	Per Kristina Roghell
1995	Kjell Erik Øie
1994	Terje Strømdahl
1993	Kim Friele
1992	Karin Enderud

=== Homophobia Award ===
Until 2009, an award known as the "Homophobia Award" or "Homophobe of the Year" was also presented, given to a person or organization that had worked against the rights of homosexuals and queer individuals. In 2009, FRI Oslo and Viken (then known as LLH Oslo and Akershus) discontinued this award to shift focus to the positive recognitions: the Fryd Award and the Honorary Award.

Year	Recipient(s)
2008	Ulf Erik Knudsen
2007	Arne Bjørn Hansen, parish priest in Ås Parish
2006	Dagbladet newspaper
2005	The Norwegian Football Association
2004	The Progress Party
2003	The Salvation Army
2002	Lena Larsen, head of the Islamic Council of Norway
2001	Norwegian Psychoanalytic Society
2000	Norwegian Olympic and Paralympic Committee and Confederation of Sports
1999	Pentecostal churches in Norway
1998	Bondevik's First Cabinet
1997	Norwegian Armed Forces Command
1996	Per Sundby
1995	Rolf Nyhus
1994	Hans J. Røsjorde
1993	Finn Jarle Sæle, editor of the newspaper Dagen
1992	Svein Alsaker
1991	Andreas Aarflot
1990	Unknown
1989	Unknown
1988	Norwegian YMCA/YWCA
1987	Kåre Rånes, for the educational film *The Little Difference*
1986	NRK's programming editor Ada Haug
1985	Willoch's Cabinet
1984	Not awarded due to too many "worthy" recipients
1983	Unknown
1982	Unknown

== Gallery ==
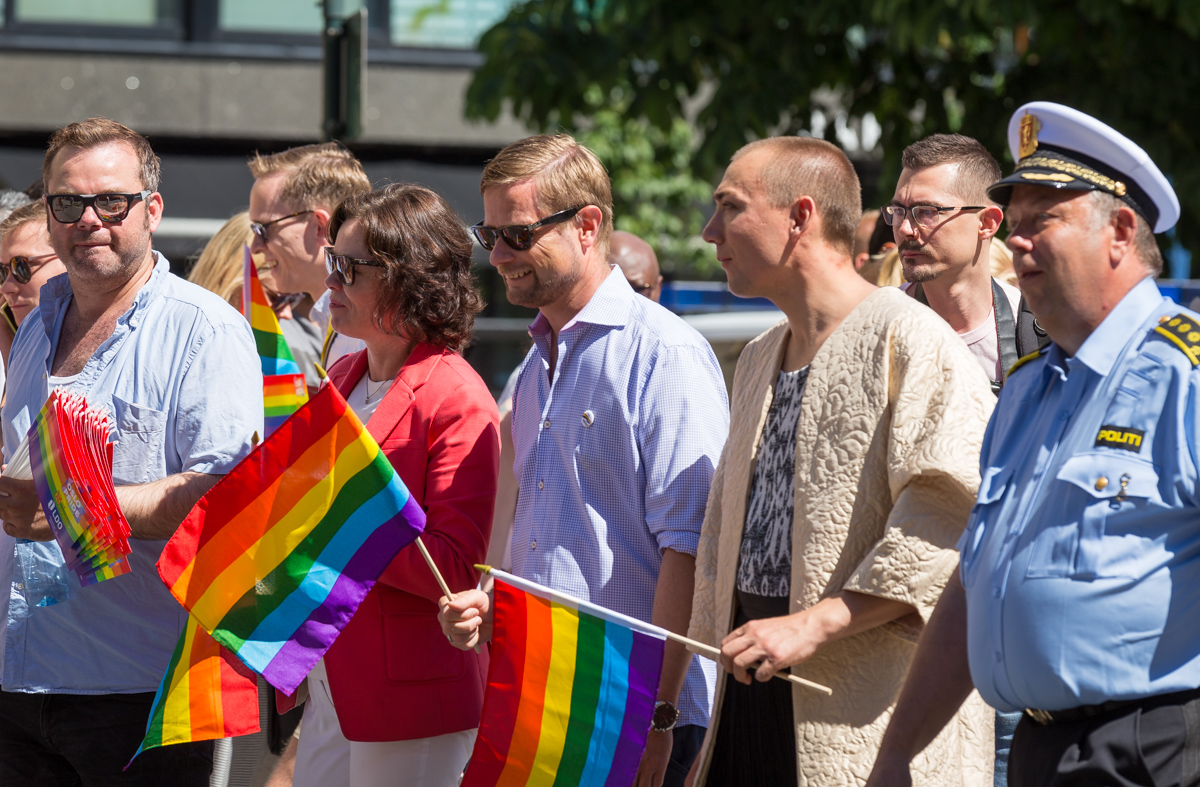
Solveig Horne and Bent Høie leading the Oslo Pride 2015 parade.

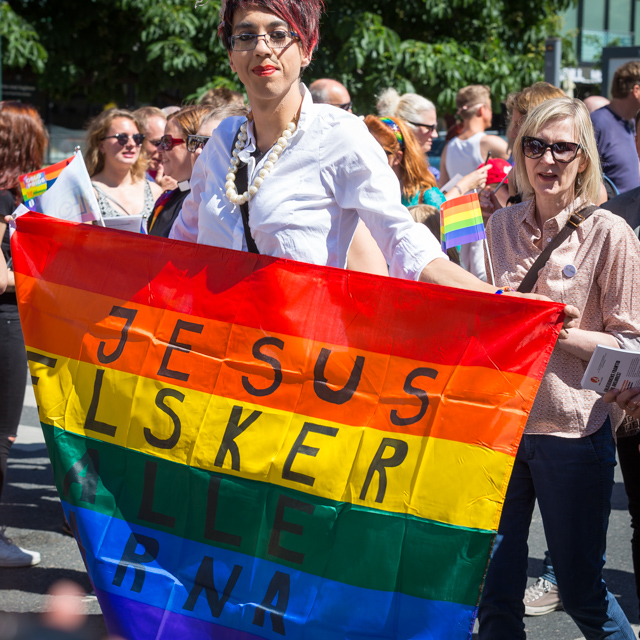
Participant with a Jesus inscription on the rainbow flag during the 2015 Pride Parade.

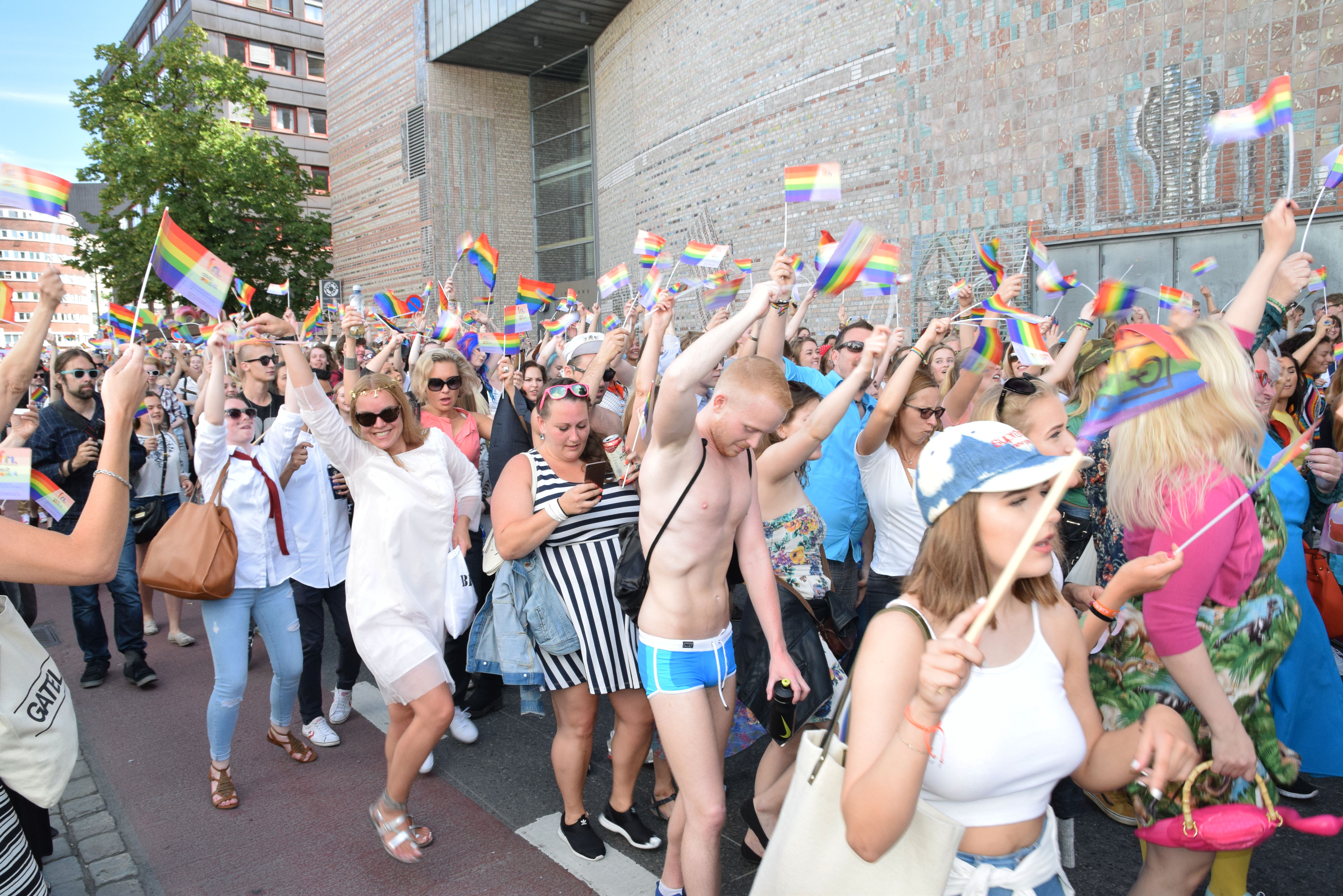
From the 2016 Pride Parade, near Oslo Spektrum.

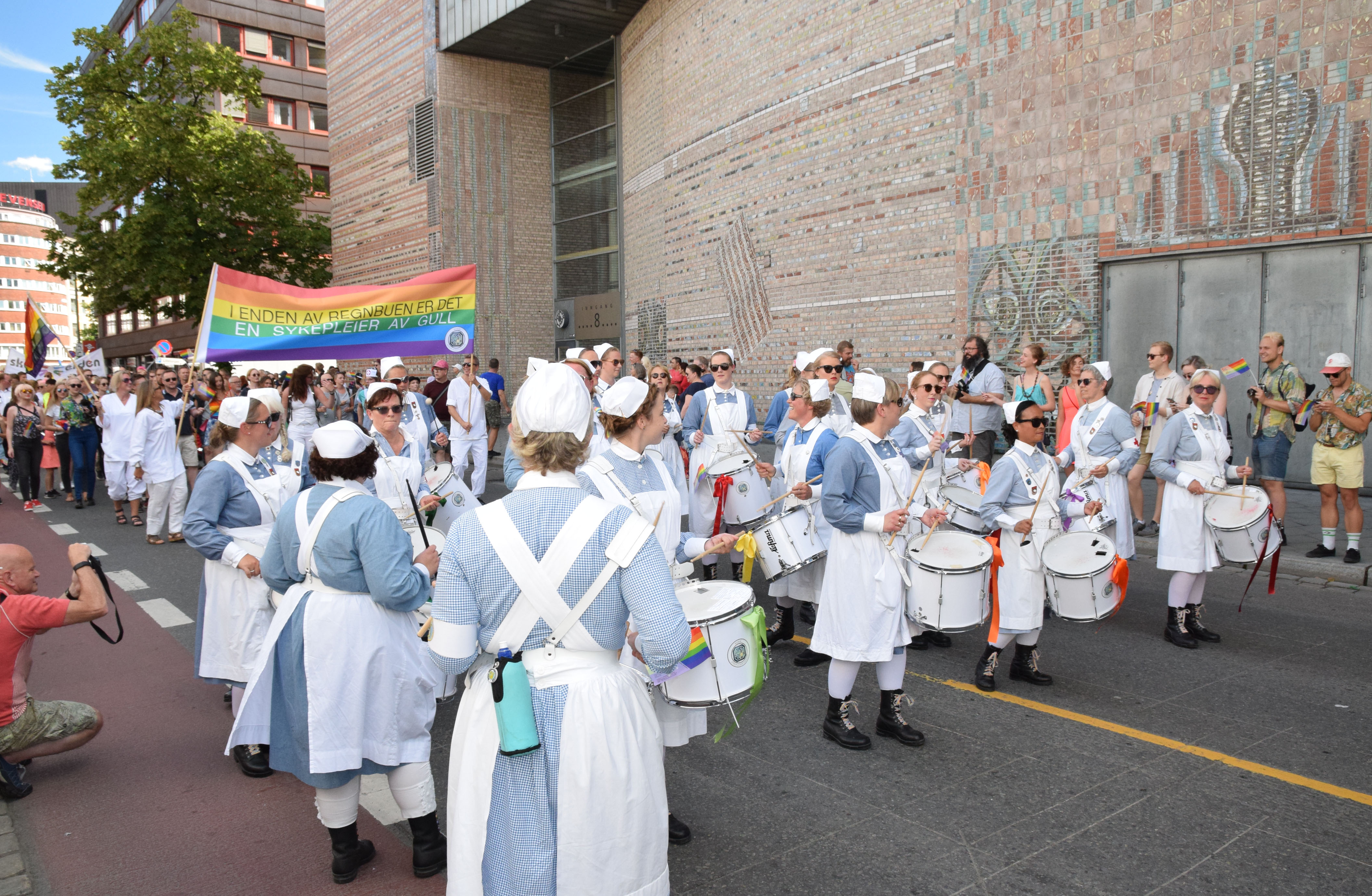
Nurses in traditional uniforms with drums during the 2016 parade.

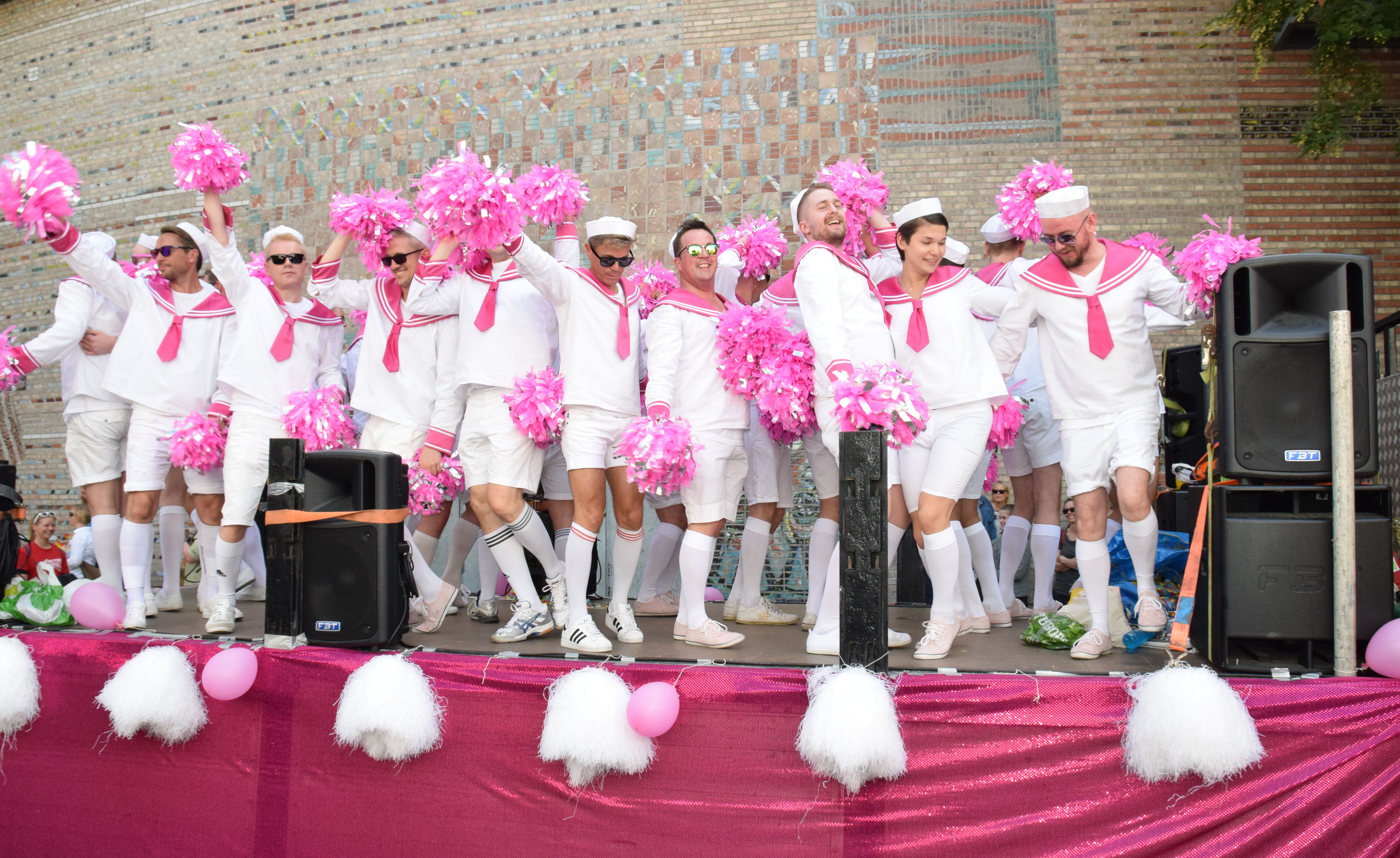
Marchers dressed in pink and white sailor suits during the 2016 parade.
