= Falch =

Falch is a surname. Notable people with the surname include:

- Anton Falch (1860–1936), American baseball player
- Aslak Falch (born 1992), Norwegian footballer
- Edgar Falch (1930–2013), Norwegian footballer
- Frank Meidell Falch (1920–2013), Norwegian media director
- Michael Falch (born 1956), Danish singer, guitarist, actor, and author
- Oswald Falch (1884–1977), Norwegian gymnast
- Ulrikke Falch (born 1996), Norwegian actress and author
