= Ingrid Halstensen =

Norwegian sportswriter

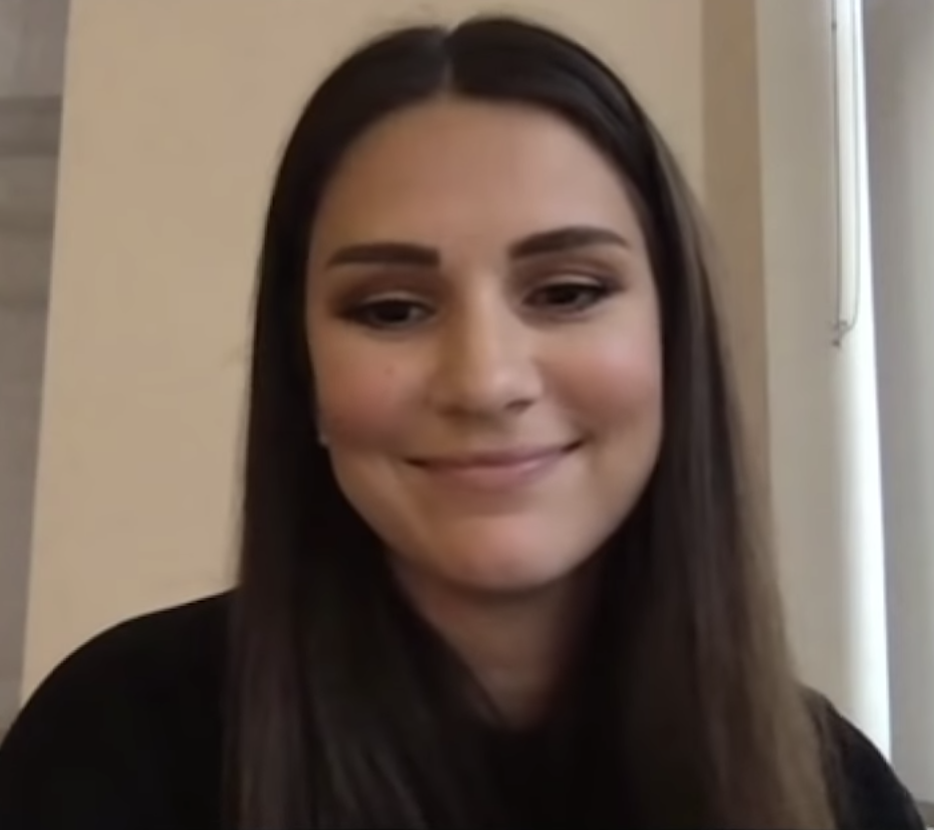
- Halstensen in 2019
- Born: 8 December 1987 (age 38)
- Occupations: sports journalist; journalist; film producer
- Employer: TV 2 sport (2010–)
- Title: Norwegian sportswriter

Ingrid Halstensen (born 8 December 1987) is a sports anchor for TV 2 and a Norwegian Premier League journalist.

== Biography ==
Halstensen started her journalistic career in 2010 by covering ice hockey for TV 2. She was TV 2's football correspondent in England from 2018 to 2020. She was nominated for Gullruten 2023 in the category of best presenter – news, sport or current affairs for TV 2's Champions League broadcasts.
