= Karen-Marie Ellefsen =

Norwegian journalist

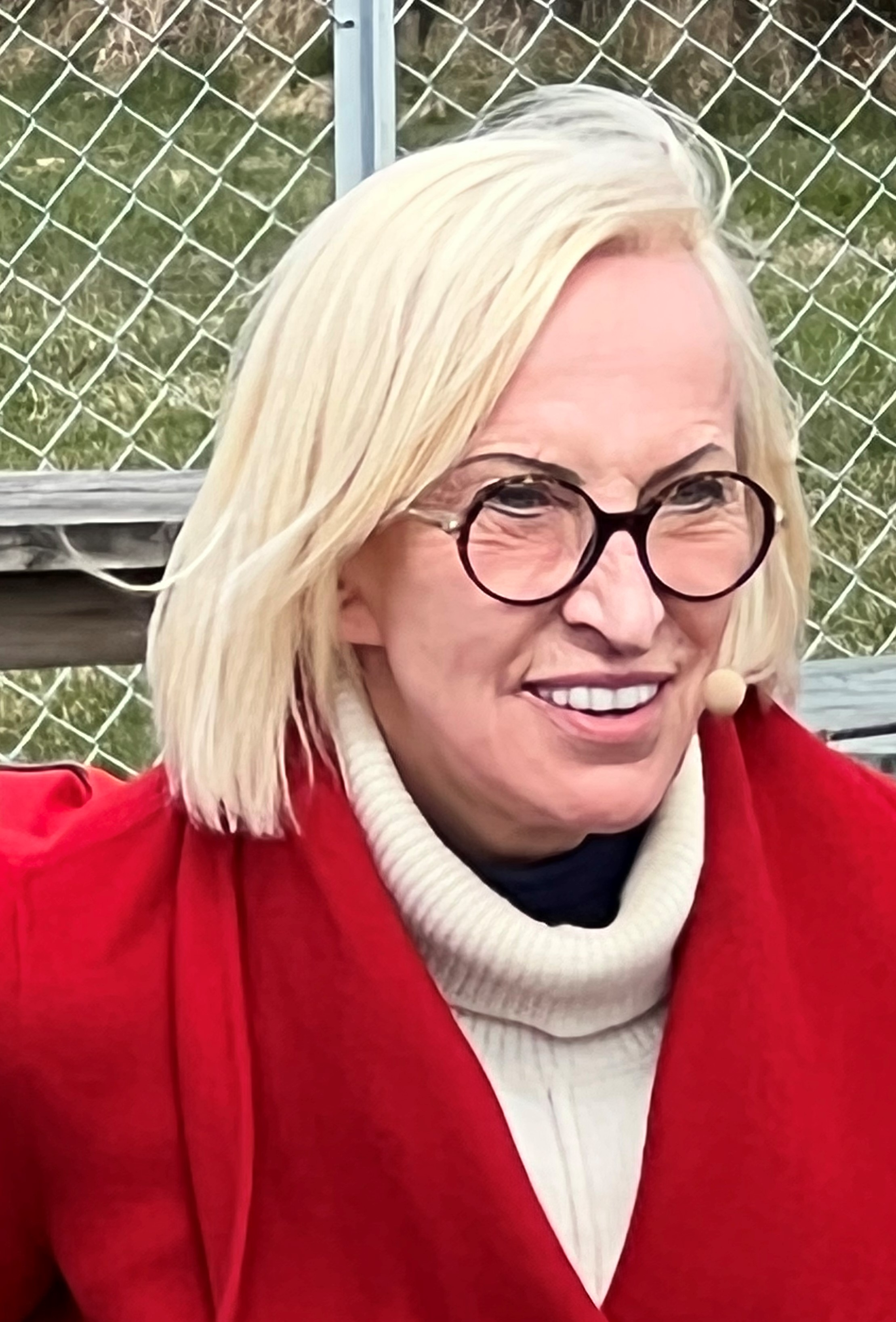
- Born: 25 August 1950 (age 76)
- Education: University of Oslo; Norsk Journalisthøgskole
- Occupations: Journalist and television host
- Years active: 1976—2020
- Employer: NRK
- Known for: Norway's first female sports reporter
- Awards: Gullruten honorary award (2011); King's Medal of Merit (2020)

Karen-Marie Ellefsen (born 25 August 1950) is a Norwegian journalist and television host. She was appointed at NRK from 1979 to 2020, and was the first Norwegian female sports reporter. Ellefsen attended Ringerike gymnasium, Skjeberg Folk High School and the University of Oslo before attending the Norwegian School of Journalism in Oslo.

== Career ==
Ellefsen studied at the University of Oslo, and graduated from Norsk Journalisthøgskole (later part of Oslo University College) in 1976. She started working as freelance for NRK from 1976, and eventually appointed as sports journalist for NRK from 1979 until her retirement in 2020. She was Norway's first female sports reporter. Her specialities included gymnastics and athletics. She covered every instance of the Summer Olympics from 1980 to 2016, the European and World Championships in Athletics, hosted events such as the 1994 Winter Olympics at Lillehammer, and was sports anchor for the daily evening news programme Dagsrevyen.

== Awards ==
Ellefsen received the Gullruten honorary award in 2011. In 2020, she was awarded the King's Medal of Merit.
