= Henrik Holm (actor) =

Norwegian actor and model (born 1995)

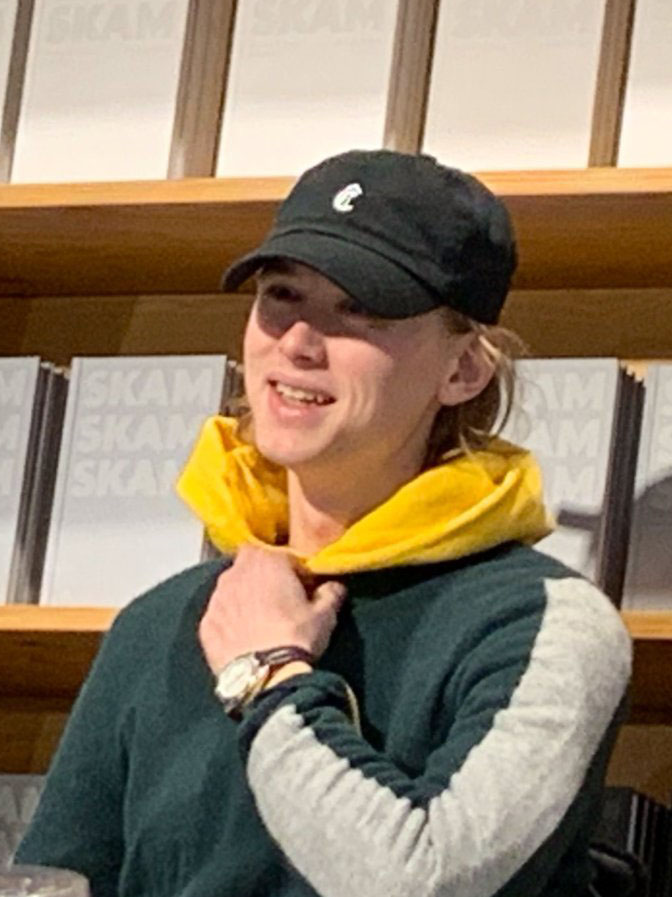
- Holm in 2018
- Born: September 12, 1995 (age 30); Oslo, Norway
- Occupations: Actor; model
- Years active: 2013–present
- Website: globalensembletalent.com/actors/henrik-holm/

Henrik Holm (born 12 September 1995) is a Norwegian actor and model. He is best known for his portrayal of Even Bech Næsheim in the third and fourth seasons of the teen drama series, Skam. Holm also played a role in the television series Halvbroren (The Half-Brother) in 2013.

Holm won the Gullruten Audience Award for his character, Even, along with co-star Tarjei Sandvik Moe's character Isak Valtersen. The Gullruten ceremony also awarded Best TV Moment of the Year to the Skam season 3 scene "O Helga Natt", in which Moe and Holm starred.

== Personal life ==
Holm dated Instagram personality Lea Meyer from 2016 to 2020.

In addition to his native Norwegian, Holm is fluent in English.

== Filmography ==
=== Film ===
Year	Title	Role	Notes
2019	Menneskets opprinnelse	Nora's Boyfriend (voice)	Short film
2019	Tunnelen	Haikeren	
2020	Poison	Lina's Boyfriend	Short film
2020	Animositet	The Pilgrim	Filming

=== Television ===
Year	Title	Role	Notes
2016–17	Skam	Even Bech Næsheim	
2013	Halvbroren	Young Peder	
2022	A Storm for Christmas	Oscar	
2023	Krypto Kings	Mikkel	
2024	Hjerte til hjerte	Henrik	
2025	Fantomet Philip	Philip Holst-Cappelen	
2025	Humoretaten	Humoretaten	

=== Theater ===
Year	Title	Role	Venue
2018	PRUMP- en musikal som stinker!		Bærum Kulturhus
2023	Benk		Nordic Black Theatre

== Awards ==
Year	Award	Category	Nominated work	Result	Ref.
2017	Gullruten	Audience Award	Skam	Won	
2026	Gullruten	Best Documentary Series	Fantomet Philip	Nominated	
