= Iman Meskini =

Norwegian actress (born 1997)

- Born: 3 March 1997 (age 28); Ski, Norway
- Occupation: Actress
- Spouse: Mourad Jarrari (m. 2019)
- Children: 1

Iman Meskini (born 3 March 1997) is a Norwegian actress. She is best known for playing the role of Sana Bakkoush in the teen drama series Skam.

== Personal life ==
Meskini grew up in the village of Langhus and identifies as a practicing Muslim. Her mother is from Norway and her father is from Tunisia. She played as a guard for the Høybråten Basketball Club during the 2016–2017 year. In 2016, Meskini majored in Arabic and Middle Eastern studies at the University of Oslo. She currently works with Norway's Air Forces. On 12 June 2019, Meskini married Mourad Jarrari from Morocco. In February 2025, Meskini gave birth to their first child, a daughter.

== Filmography ==
=== Film ===
Year	Title	Role	Notes
2018	B4		
2021	Pørni		
2023	Den første julen i Skomakergata		
2025	Second Victims	Alda	

=== Television ===
Year	Title	Role	Notes
2015–2017	Skam	Sana Bakkoush	Main role

== Skam ==
Meskini became known for her role as Sana Bakkoush from Julie Andem's teen web series's Skam, which is broadcast on NRK. Her character status was recurring from seasons 1–3, then later turned to lead in season 4.

=== Reception ===
Since her first appearance on Skam, and especially since the show's fourth season, in which she served as the primary lead, Sana has gathered a large number of fans. In addition to Sana's popularity, Meskini has been praised for her portrayal of the character and her representation of Muslim youth within Western societies, but especially female Muslim teenagers living in Norway.

Sana's appearance and portrayal on a show as popular as Skam at a time which saw a rise in Islamophobia across the globe was marked by many as essential in challenging stereotypes of hijab-wearing Muslim women and provided non-Muslim Norwegians with an alternative representation of their Muslim neighbours.

== Other projects ==
She also starred in B4 (2018) and Pørni (2021).
