= Thomas Hayes (actor) =

Norwegian-British actor and DJ (born 1997)

- Born: 7 March 1997 (age 29); Akershus, Norway
- Occupations: Actor, DJ
- Years active: 2015–present

Thomas Hayes (born 7 March 1997) is a Norwegian-British actor and DJ. He is best known for his role as William Magnusson in the Norwegian teen drama web series Skam.

== Filmography ==
=== Film ===
- Fuck Fossils (2017)

=== TV ===
- SKAM (2015–2017)
- Elven / The River (2017)
- His Name Is Not William (2018)

== Music ==
Hayes appeared in the music video "Ignite", released by K-391 & Alan Walker (feat. Julie Bergan & Seungri) on 12 May 2018.

He also appeared in the music video for "Electro House 2019", released by EJP.

Hayes recently released a song with Nico & Vinz called "Where I Belong", under his DJ/musician alias HAYES.
