= WtFOCK =

wtFOCK
- Also known as: Skam Belgium; wtFOCK: Ada; wtFOCK: Anaïs; Otis
- Genre: Teen drama
- Created by: Julie Andem
- Developed by: Kris Gaens; Bram Renders; Cecilia Verheyden
- Screenplay by: Bram Renders (season 1–4, 6–7, Otis); Rutger Beckers (season 2–4); Kris Gaens (season 2–4); Lise De Kam (season 5); Geert Verbanck (season 5); Julie Bovendaerde (season 6–7, Otis); Jasmien Vandermeeren (season 7)
- Directed by: Cecilia Verheyden (season 1); Tom Goris (season 2–3, 5); Bente Peters (season 4–5); Caroline De Maeyer (season 6–7); Jaap van Veen (Otis)
- Starring: Femke van der Steen; Veerle Dejaeger; Willem Herbots; Romi van Renterghem; Nora Dari; Ella van Remortel; Laura Bekaert; Mathis Mavuela
- Country of origin: Belgium (Flanders)
- Original language: Flemish
- No. of seasons: 8
- No. of episodes: 82

Production
- Production locations: Antwerp, Belgium
- Running time: 18–38 minutes
- Production company: Sputnik Media

Original release
- Network: VIER (2018, 2023); VIJF (2018–2020); Play More (2018–2020); Streamz (2020–2021); GoPlay (2021–present)
- Release: 1 October 2018 – present

WtFOCK (stylised as wtFOCK, pronounced as wha-teh-fock) is a Flemish teen drama web series broadcast by Play4 that follows the lives of teenagers in Antwerp. Broadcast was then taken over by Belgian streaming services Play More, Streamz, and GoPlay in preceding years. It is an adaptation of the popular Norwegian series SKAM. By the end of the first season, it was reported that around 100,000 people were watching wtFOCK every week. When the show returned with a sixth season, featuring a new cast and original storylines, it was estimated that wtFOCK episodes had been streamed over 3 million times since their release. Every season centers on a different character and their daily struggles. The show utilizes real time clip uploads, Instagram, and TikTok to give the characters a realistic feel.

== Concept ==
wtFOCK focuses on a group of friends in their teen life in Antwerp, specifically at Koninklijk Atheneum Berchem in the first five seasons, and then at Kunstkaai Secondary School from the sixth season onwards. The show deals with daily and current events, like friendship, love and the search for identity. Every season centers on a different character, their daily life, and their own struggles. The show occurs in real time, meaning when something happens at a certain date or time, scenes are uploaded to the show's website, called "clips." The show also utilizes Instagram, TikTok, and text message screenshots to give the characters a realistic feel.

After the end of season 7, the show subsequently dropped its wtFOCK branding. However, the show still utilizes official wtFOCK accounts for promotion. The show also still uses other aspects of the original format, such as the characters' social media accounts and by dropping clips daily, although no longer in real time.

== Premise ==
=== First Generation ===
The first season introduces viewers to Jana Ackermans, the new student at the school that her boyfriend Jens and her ex-best friend Britt attend. Jana only spends time with Jens and his friends, until she makes friends with a new group of girls that help her gain back her confidence and courage, and helps her rediscover who she really is.

The second season then focuses on Jana's new best friend, Zoë Loockx, who goes on a journey of self-growth and self-discovery as she balances her friendships with her new found feelings for Senne, a popular boy at school, which clashes with her feminist values. Other themes for the season include sexual assault.

The third season follows Robbe IJzermans, Jens' best friend, as he grapples with his coming out, as well as his balancing of his relationships with both his mother, who suffers from mental illness, and his love interest, Sander, who is bipolar.

Starting with season four, the show tackled original storylines surrounding a new character, Kato Fransen. This season was created around the COVID-19 pandemic, also dealing with topics of racism, social media, and self-harm, as Kato starts a new school, makes friends with the Girl Squad, and forms a romantic interest in Moyo, a friend of Robbe and Jens.

Season five pivoted back to the original storyline in Skam, focusing on Yasmina Ait Omar, a Muslim teenager who starts to question herself and those around her, as she falls for Younes, her brother's friend who isn't Muslim, and becomes isolated at school from her friend group due to racist and xenophobic incidents that occur while planning a school trip.

=== Second Generation ===
Starting from season six onwards, wtFOCK introduced a new set of original characters. These characters have no connections to the previous cast, and attend a different school. The main character of season 6 is Ada Konings, who struggles to understand her sexuality after hesitating to lose her virginity to her boyfriend, Finn, as well as struggling to balance that with her friendships and her relationship with her half-sister, Mila.

Season 7 focuses on one of Ada's friends, Anaïs Davis, who is considered the "mom" of their friend group. As her parents begin the divorce process, Anaïs begins to use alcohol and other substances to cope. She also meets Bobbie, who drags Anaïs into her own reckless life as they fall in love. However, one of their nocturnal escapades go awry, and hurts one of Anaïs' friends in the process. As a result, she feels torn between the girl she loves and her friends.

Otis, a rebranding of the show, centers around Ada and Anaïs' friend, Otis Rojas. In this season, Otis is approached by Liv, a model scout who invites him for a photo shoot: the beginning of a rollercoaster in which the world of glamour, the catwalk and parties take center stage.

== Cast and characters ==
=== Central characters ===
Actor	Character	Based on	First Generation						Second Generation		
Actor	Character	Based on	1	2	3	wtFOCKDOWN	4	5	6	7	Otis
Femke van der Steen	Jana Ackermans	Eva Kviig Mohn	Central	Main	Recurring	7 clips	Guest	Guest			
Veerle Dejaeger	Zoë Loockx	Noora Amalie Sætre	Main	Central	Main	9 clips	Main	Main			
Willem Herbots	Robbe IJzermans	Isak Valtersen	Main	Main	Central	10 clips	Main	Recurring			
Romi van Renterghem	Kato Fransen						Central	Main			
Nora Dari	Yasmina Ait Omar	Sana Bakkoush	Main	Main	Recurring	6 clips	Main	Central			
Ella van Remortel	Ada Konings								Central	Main	Recurring
Laura Bekaert	Anaïs Davis								Main	Central	Recurring
Mathis Mavuela	Otis Rojas								Main	Main	Central

=== Main characters ===
Actor	Character	Based on	First Generation						Second Generation		
Actor	Character	Based on	1	2	3	wtFOCKDOWN	4	5	6	7	Otis
Nona Janssens	Amber Snoeckx	Vilde Hellerud Lien	Main	Main	Recurring	7 clips	Main	Main			
Yara Veyt	Luca Lomans	Christina "Chris" Berg	Main	Main	Recurring	5 clips	Main	Main			
Nathan Bouts	Jens Stoffels	Jonas Noah Vasquez	Main	Recurring	Main	5 clips	Main	Recurring			
Lilith Pas	Britt Ingelbrecht	Ingrid Theis Gaupseth	Recurring	Main	Recurring			style="background: #FFE3E3; color:black; vertical-align: middle; text-align: center; " class="table-cast"| Recurring			data-sort-value="" style="background: var(--background-color-interactive, #ececec); color: var(--color-base, inherit); vertical-align: middle; text-align: center; " class="table-na" |
Lilith Pas	Britt Ingelbrecht	Sonja	Recurring	Main	Recurring			style="background: #FFE3E3; color:black; vertical-align: middle; text-align: center; " class="table-cast"| Recurring			data-sort-value="" style="background: var(--background-color-interactive, #ececec); color: var(--color-base, inherit); vertical-align: middle; text-align: center; " class="table-na" |
Lilith Pas	Britt Ingelbrecht	Sara Nørstelien	Recurring	Main	Recurring			style="background: #FFE3E3; color:black; vertical-align: middle; text-align: center; " class="table-cast"| Recurring			data-sort-value="" style="background: var(--background-color-interactive, #ececec); color: var(--color-base, inherit); vertical-align: middle; text-align: center; " class="table-na" |
Nathan Naenen	Senne De Smet	William Magnusson	Recurring	Main	Main	9 clips	Recurring	Recurring			
Willem De Schryver	Sander Driesen	Even Bech Næsheim			Main	10 clips	Recurring	Recurring			
Noa Izai Tambwe Kabati	Moyo Makadi	Mahdi Disi		style="background: #FFE3E3; color:black; vertical-align: middle; text-align: center; " class="table-cast"| Recurring		Main	4 clips	Main	Recurring		data-sort-value="" style="background: var(--background-color-interactive, #ececec); color: var(--color-base, inherit); vertical-align: middle; text-align: center; " class="table-na" |
Noa Izai Tambwe Kabati	Moyo Makadi	Elias		style="background: #FFE3E3; color:black; vertical-align: middle; text-align: center; " class="table-cast"| Recurring		Main	4 clips	Main	Recurring		data-sort-value="" style="background: var(--background-color-interactive, #ececec); color: var(--color-base, inherit); vertical-align: middle; text-align: center; " class="table-na" |
Aaron Roggeman	Aaron Jacobs	Magnus Fossbakken			Main	6 clips	Main	Recurring			
Lars Brinkman	Milan Hendrickx	Eskild Tryggvasson		Main	Main	5 clips	Recurring	Recurring			
Hanna Mensink	Noor Bauwens	Emma W. Larzen			Main		Guest				
Akram Saibari	Elias Ait Omar	Elias Bakkoush						Main			
Ismaïl L'Hamiti	Younes El Amrani	Yousef Acar						Main			
Mo Bakker	Finn Verschaeren								Main	Main	
Dara Oguntubi	Mila Minten								Main	Main	Recurring
Nona 't Jolle	Hanne Dewit								Main	Main	Main
Junes Callaert	Noah Wolfs								Main	Main	Guest
Jul Goossens	Bas Brosens								Main		
Willem Loobuyck	Miro Goris								Main		
Nell Cattrysse	Bobbie De Bruyn									Main	Recurring
Felix Meyer	Jules Ghesquire										Main
Lauren Versnick	Liv Staton										Main
Brecht Dael	Elias Paradiaens										Main

=== Recurring and guest characters ===
Actor	Character	Based on	First Generation						Second Generation		
Actor	Character	Based on	1	2	3	wtFOCKDOWN	4	5	6	7	Otis
Maarten Cop	Luka Lemmens	Christoffer "Penetrator-Chris" Schistad	Recurring	Recurring							
Britt Hellinx	Gill De Schepper	Mari Aspeflaten	Guest	Recurring							
Isabel Leybaert	Mama Jana	Mama Eva	Recurring	Guest (Note: Leybaert can be heard in the first episode of the second season, but she is not credited)							
Cassandra Krols	Marie Eggermont	Iben Sandberg	Recurring		Guest		Guest	Recurring			
Awa Ndiaye	Keisha Diallo	Argentina	Recurring	Guest	Guest						
Zoe Schools	Maud	Sara Nørstelien		Guest							
Louise Bergez	Lisa De Geyter	Linn Larsen Hansen		Recurring	Guest (Note: Bergez appears as Lisa in the first episode of Season 3, but is not credited)						
Stijn Coppens	Max Van Damme			Recurring	Guest						
Jonathan Michiels	Viktor Deruwe	Nikolai Magnusson		Recurring	Guest (Note: Michiels appears as Viktor in the sixth episode of Season 3, but is not credited)						
Amber van Asch	Helena Van Loon						Guest	Recurring			
Shayma Moustafa	Aïcha Noori	Jamilla Bikarim						Recurring			
Jamila Channouf	Salouah Ait Omar	Mama Sana						Recurring			
Abdellah Dari	Hassan Ait Omar	Papa Sana						Recurring			
Valentin Braeckman	Olivier										Guest
Bavo Buys	Janesh										Guest
Stefan Perceval	Luc										Guest
Shauni Goetz	Tina										Guest

== Episodes ==
=== Series overview ===
Season	Episodes	Originally released		
Season	Episodes	First released	Last released	Network
1	12	October 7, 2018	December 21, 2018	VIER; VIJF; Play More
2	10	April 26, 2019	June 28, 2019	VIJF; Play More
3	10	October 18, 2019	December 20, 2019	VIJF; Play More
4	10	September 4, 2020	November 7, 2020	VIJF; GoPlay; Streamz
5	10	April 19, 2021	June 25, 2021	GoPlay; Streamz
6	10	April 28, 2023	June 30, 2023	GoPlay
7	10	October 20, 2023	December 22, 2023	GoPlay; VIER
8	10	May 17, 2024	2024	GoPlay

=== Season 1 (2018) ===
Season 1 aired from 1 October to 21 December 2018 and comprised 12 episodes. Jana Ackermans is the central character and the season focuses on her relationship with her boyfriend Jens as well as themes of loneliness, identity and friendship.

No. overall	No. in season	Title	Duration	Original release date
1	1	"Ger ziet eruit als een hoer (You look like a slut)"	25 min	October 7, 2018
2	2	"Stap er op af, stel u voor, zeg hallo (Go to them, introduce yourself, say hello)"	21 min	October 13, 2018
3	3	"Wij zijn de grootste losers van't school (We're the biggest losers in the school)"	18 min	October 20, 2018
4	4	"Zuig hem helemaal leeg (Suck him completely dry)"	19 min	October 27, 2018
5	5	"Gij wordt geil van kleren en make-up? (Clothes and make-up make you horny?)"	23 min	November 3, 2018
6	6	"Iedereen weet toch dat jongens over alles liegen (Everyone knows guys lie about everything)"	21 min	November 10, 2018
7	7	"Ge had nog geen haar op uw ballen toen ge in het derde middelbaar zat (You didn't have hair on your balls in your first year of high school)"	21 min	November 17, 2018
8	8	"Moet ik het spellen? Het begint met een N en eindigt op EE. (Should I spell it? Starts with N ends with EE.)"	21 min	November 24, 2018
9	9	"Ik snap gewoon niet meer wie ge zijt (I just don't understand who you are anymore)"	23 min	December 1, 2018
10	10	"Please. Zeg dit niet tegen Jens... (Please. Don't tell Jens...)"	22 min	December 8, 2018
11	11	"Fuck, gij zijt sexy (Fuck, you are sexy)"	18 min	December 14, 2018
12	12	"Dat was gewoon kutadvies (It was just really stupid advice)"	27 min	December 21, 2018

=== Season 2 (2019) ===
Season 2 aired from 22 April to 28 June 2019 and comprised 10 episodes. Zoë Loockx is the central character and the season focuses on her relationship with Senne, a popular boy at school, and themes of friendship, self-image and sexual abuse.

No. overall	No. in season	Title	Duration	Original release date
13	1	"Ze is helemaal obsessed met een foute gast (She is completely obsessed with a bad guy)"	25 min	April 26, 2019
14	2	"Ik heb precies een aflevering gemist (It seems as if I missed an episode)"	34 min	May 4, 2019
15	3	"Gij hebt geen recht om pissed te zijn op mij! (You have no right to be pissed at me!)"	33 min	May 11, 2019
16	4	"Zoë Loockx, nu moet ge voorzichtig zijn (Zoë Loockx, now you have to be careful)"	28 min	May 17, 2019
17	5	"Stop met zo lekker to zijn (Stop being so hot)"	25 min	May 24, 2019
18	6	"Is hij wel goed genoeg voor u? (Is he good enough for you?)"	33 min	May 31, 2019
19	7	"Ik wil gewoon twee seconden alleen zijn (I just want to be alone for two seconds)"	29 min	June 7, 2019
20	8	"Iemand heeft last van examenstress (Someone's suffering from exam stress)"	31 min	June 14, 2019
21	9	"Het is alleen maar ingewikkeld als je het ingewikkeld maakt (It is only complicated if you make it complicated)"	24 min	June 21, 2019
22	10	"Hij mag hier niet mee wegkomen (He can't get away with this)"	30 min	June 28, 2019

=== Season 3 (2019) ===
Season 3 aired from 12 October to 20 December 2019 and comprised 10 episodes. Robbe IJzermans is the central character and the season focuses on his coming out as gay and his relationship with Sander, who struggles with bipolar disorder. It also deals with themes of sexual identity, homosexuality and mental health. Clips from Season 3 were viewed ten million times within seven weeks of the series starting.

No. overall	No. in season	Title	Duration	Original release date
23	1	"Gij zou u niet laten pijpen door haar? (You wouldn't let her give you a blowjob?)"	30 min	October 18, 2019
24	2	"Playing hard to get?"	22 min	October 25, 2019
25	3	"Wat heb ik te verliezen? (What have I got to lose?)"	31 min	November 1, 2019
26	4	"Ik twijfel een beetje (I doubt a bit)"	33 min	November 8, 2019
27	5	"Het ligt toch niet aan mij? (It's not me, is it?)"	38 min	November 15, 2019
28	6	"Het ging allemaal focking snel (It all went focking fast)"	26 min	November 22, 2019
29	7	"Ik heb het verpest. Ik weet het. (I ruined it. I know.)"	27 min	November 29, 2019
30	8	"Zo rap ben je nog niet van me af (You haven't got rid of me that fast)"	27 min	December 6, 2019
31	9	"Je bent gewoon zijn volgende obsessie (You're just his next obsession)"	25 min	December 13, 2019
32	10	"Ander onderwerp. Oké? (Another topic. Okay?)"	34 min	December 20, 2019

=== Season 4 (2020) ===
Season 4 aired from 29 August to 7 November 2020. The series diverged from the original SKAM storyline with a new character, Kato Fransen. The storyline deals with social media, racism, self-harm, drugs, and COVID-19.

No. overall	No. in season	Title	Duration	Original release date
33	1	"Focking kutvirus. (Fucking shitvirus.)"	23 min	September 4, 2020
34	2	"Die Moyo heeft wel iets. (There's something about Moyo.)"	20 min	September 11, 2020
35	3	"Nobody puts baby Kato in the corner."	21 min	September 18, 2020
36	4	"Wat een schmett. (What a schmett.)"	16 min	September 25, 2020
37	5	"Get the fock out."	22 min	October 2, 2020
38	6	"Ze zijn er echt over gegaan. (They really went too far.)"	26 min	October 9, 2020
39	7	"Alles vor de liefde. (Everything for love.)"	19 min	October 16, 2020
40	8	"Niemand luistert echt naar mij. (Nobody really listens to me.)"	20 min	October 23, 2020
41	9	"Ik denk niet dat dat zo slim is. (I don't think that that's smart.)"	20 min	October 30, 2020
42	10	"Sommige shit veroorzaakt ge zelf. (Some shit you caused yourself.)"	23 min	November 6, 2020

=== Season 5 (2021) ===
Season 5 started airing on 19 April 2021 and finished airing on 25 June 2021. Yasmina Ait Omar is the central character, with the season focusing on ideas of faith and religion, being Muslim in Belgium, and the holy month of Ramadan.

No. overall	No. in season	Title	Duration	Original release date
43	1	"Aflevering 1 (Episode 1)"	24 min	April 23, 2021
44	2	"Aflevering 2 (Episode 2)"	27 min	April 30, 2021
45	3	"Aflevering 3 (Episode 3)"	23 min	May 7, 2021
46	4	"Aflevering 4 (Episode 4)"	32 min	May 14, 2021
47	5	"Aflevering 5 (Episode 5)"	28 min	May 21, 2021
48	6	"Aflevering 6 (Episode 6)"	20 min	May 28, 2021
49	7	"Aflevering 7 (Episode 7)"	20 min	June 4, 2021
50	8	"Aflevering 8 (Episode 8)"	32 min	June 11, 2021
51	9	"Aflevering 9 (Episode 9)"	23 min	June 18, 2021
52	10	"Aflevering 10 (Episode 10)"	34 min	June 25, 2021

=== Season 6 (2023) ===
Season 6 began airing clips on 22 April 2023, ending on 30 June 2023. This season shifts to the perspective of a new class of students at Kunstkaai Secondary School, a school that focuses on artistic and creative pursuits. The central character is Ada Konings, who attempts to understand her sexuality as she hesitates to lose her virginity to her boyfriend, Finn. The season also follows her friendships and relationships with Hanne, Otis, Anaïs, Noah, and her older half-sister, Mila, who was held back a year in school.

No. overall	No. in season	Title	Duration	Original release date
53	1	"Aflevering Week 1 (Week 1)"	22 min	April 28, 2023
54	2	"Aflevering Week 2 (Week 2)"	25 min	May 5, 2023
55	3	"Aflevering Week 3 (Week 3)"	22 min	May 12, 2023
56	4	"Aflevering Week 4 (Week 4)"	24 min	May 19, 2023
57	5	"Aflevering Week 5 (Week 5)"	27 min	May 26, 2023
58	6	"Aflevering Week 6 (Week 6)"	23 min	June 2, 2023
59	7	"Aflevering Week 7 (Week 7)"	19 min	June 9, 2023
60	8	"Aflevering Week 8 (Week 8)"	22 min	June 16, 2023
61	9	"Aflevering Week 9 (Week 9)"	24 min	June 23, 2023
62	10	"Aflevering Week 10 (Week 10)"	23 min	June 30, 2023

=== Season 7 (2023) ===
Season 7 was confirmed to be forthcoming after the airing of the last clip of season six. Anaïs Davis is the central character, and the season focuses on her burgeoning romantic relationship with Bobbie. Themes of this season include alcohol abuse, substance abuse, divorce, reckless behavior, and friendship. The first clip of the season dropped on 14 October 2023. The season ended on December 22, 2023.

No. overall	No. in season	Title	Duration	Original release date
63	1	"De seks was goed, maar hij klonk echt als een deb (The sex was good, but he really sounded like an idiot)" / "Aflevering Week 1 (Week 1)"	21 min	October 20, 2023
64	2	"Sorry not sorry" / "Aflevering Week 2 (Week 2)"	22 min	October 27, 2023
65	3	"Is tequila sterke drank? (Is tequila a liquor?)" / "Aflevering Week 3 (Week 3)"	25 min	November 3, 2023
66	4	"What's with the tension, girls?" / "Aflevering Week 4 (Week 4)"	23 min	November 10, 2023
67	5	"Da's niet babbelen. Da's bitchen. (That's not talking. That's bitching.)" / "Aflevering Week 5 (Week 5)"	25 min	November 17, 2023
68	6	"Elke seconde telt. (Every second counts.)" / "Aflevering Week 6 (Week 6)"	23 min	November 24, 2023
69	7	"I mean, poseer nog wat meer... (I mean, pose some more...)" / "Aflevering Week 7 (Week 7)"	21 min	December 1, 2023
70	8	"Wie vertrouwt hier fucking wie niet? (Who doesn't fucking trust who here?)" / "Aflevering Week 8 (Week 8)"	23 min	December 8, 2023
71	9	"Mijn leven is fucked en da's door u! (My life is fucked and it's because of you!)" / "Aflevering Week 9 (Week 9)"	25 min	December 15, 2023
72	10	"Everybody's gotta learn sometime." / "Aflevering Week 10 (Week 10)"	24 min	December 22, 2023

=== Otis (2024) ===
The season premiered on Friday, 17 May 2024, with clips dropping daily afterwards. The season centers around Otis Rojas, Ada and Anaïs' friend, who is scouted for a modeling job and quickly drawn into an intoxicating environment of fashion, glamour and parties. Themes of this season include toxic relationships, self-image, alcohol abuse, drug abuse, and friendship. The season concluded with a two-hour finale on 12 July 2024.

No. overall	No. in season	Title	Duration	Original release date
73	1	"Aflevering Week 1 (Week 1)"	19 min	May 17, 2024
74	2	"Aflevering Week 2 (Week 2)"	23 min	May 24, 2024
75	3	"Aflevering Week 3 (Week 3)"	20 min	May 31, 2024
76	4	"Aflevering Week 4 (Week 4)"	21 min	June 7, 2024
77	5	"Aflevering Week 5 (Week 5)"	21 min	June 14, 2024
78	6	"Aflevering Week 6 (Week 6)"	24 min	June 21, 2024
79	7	"Aflevering Week 7 (Week 7)"	20 min	June 28, 2024
80	8	"Aflevering Week 8 (Week 8)"	23 min	July 5, 2024
81	9	"Aflevering Week 9 (Week 9)"	20 min	July 12, 2024
82	10	"Aflevering Week 10 (Week 10)"	21 min	July 12, 2024

== Webisodes ==
=== wtFOCKDOWN ===
Due to the COVID-19 pandemic, filming for the fourth season was halted. wtFOCKDOWN was a way to continue filming while social distancing. Starting on 1 April 2020, it follows the lives of the characters while in lockdown through video calls and messages. wtFOCKDOWN clips have been viewed over 2 million times as of May 2020.

No.	Title	Original release date
1	"Woensdag 18:45 (Wednesday 6:45pm)"	April 1, 2020
2	"Donderdag 18:06 (Thursday 6:06pm)"	April 2, 2020
3	"Vrijdag 17:54 (Friday 5:54pm)"	April 3, 2020
4	"Zaterdag 15:13 (Saturday 3:13pm)"	April 4, 2020
5	"Maandag 22:12 (Monday 10:12pm)"	April 6, 2020
6	"Dinsdag 17:54 (Tuesday 5:54pm)"	April 7, 2020
7	"Woensdag 18:32 (Wednesday 6:32pm)"	April 8, 2020
8	"Donderdag 21:27 (Thursday 9:27pm)"	April 9, 2020
9	"Vrijdag 18:37 (Friday 6:37pm)"	April 10, 2020
10	"Zaterdag 21:43 (Saturday 9:43pm)"	April 11, 2020
11	"Zondag 16:27 (Sunday 4:27pm)"	April 12, 2020
12	"Zondag 17:59 (Sunday 5:59pm)"	April 12, 2020
13	"Dinsdag 23:12 (Tuesday 11:12pm)"	April 14, 2020
14	"Woensdag 18:44 (Wednesday 6:44pm)"	April 15, 2020
15	"Donderdag 10:22 (Thursday 10:22am)"	April 16, 2020
16	"Vrijdag 16:12 (Friday 4:12pm)"	April 17, 2020
17	"Zaterdag 18:47 (Saturday 6:47pm)"	April 18, 2020
18	"Zondag 13:56 (Sunday 1:56pm)"	April 19, 2020
19	"Maandag 21:43 (Monday 9:43pm)"	April 20, 2020
20	"Dinsdag 14:17 (Tuesday 2:17pm)"	April 21, 2020
21	"Woensdag 12:14 (Wednesday 12:14pm)"	April 22, 2020
22	"Donderdag 17:11 (Thursday 5:11pm)"	April 23, 2020
23	"Vrijdag 14:37 (Friday 2:37pm)"	April 25, 2020
24	"Zaterdag 16:06 (Saturday 4:06pm)"	April 26, 2020
25	"Zondag 14:24 (Sunday 2:24pm)"	April 27, 2020
26	"Maandag 20:01 (Monday 8:01pm)"	April 28, 2020
27	"Dinsdag 19:12 (Tuesday 7:12pm)"	April 29, 2020
28	"Woensdag 19:04 (Wednesday 7:04pm)"	April 30, 2020
29	"Donderdag 21:27 (Thursday 9:27pm)"	May 1, 2020
30	"Vrijdag 14:38 (Friday 2:38pm)"	May 2, 2020
31	"Zaterdag 16:07 (Saturday 4:07pm)"	May 3, 2020
32	"Zondag 19:00 (Sunday 7:00pm)"	May 4, 2020
