= Battle: Freestyle =

- Directed by: Ingvild Søderlind
- Written by: Martina Cecelia; Maja Lunde
- Starring: Lisa Teige; Fabian Svegaard; Ellen Dorrit Petersen
- Production companies: Friland Produksjon; Netflix Studios; Paasan
- Distributed by: Netflix
- Release date: April 1, 2022
- Running time: 88 minutes
- Country: Norway
- Language: Norwegian

Battle: Freestyle is a 2022 Norwegian film directed by Ingvild Søderlind, written by Martina Cecelia and Maja Lundeand and starring Lisa Teige, Fabian Svegaard and Ellen Dorrit Petersen.

== Cast ==
- Lisa Teige as Amalie
- Fabian Svegaard Tapia as Mikael
- Ellen Dorrit Petersen as Vivian
- Bao Andre Nguyen as Moa
- Georgia May Anta as Alex
- Morad Aziman as Josef
- Keiona as Fabienne
- Léa Djyl as Maxine
- Lea Lavabre as Ella
- Adeline Tayoro as MC
- Ola G. Furuseth as Hans Christian
- Christine Grace Szarko as Gabrielle
- Philou
