= Lisa Teige =

Norwegian actress and dancer (born 1998)

- Born: 19 January 1998 (age 27); Bergen, Norway
- Occupations: Actress; dancer
- Years active: 2015–present

Lisa Teige (born 19 January 1998) is a Norwegian actress and dancer. She played Eva in the TV series Skam (2015–2017). In 2018, she played Amalie in the Norwegian film Battle.

== Filmography ==
=== Movies ===
Year	Title	Role	Note
2016	Forestillingen	Sara Danielsen	Norwegian short film
2018	Battle	Amalie	Norwegian
2022	Battle: Freestyle	Amalie	Norwegian

=== Television ===
Year	Title	Role	Note
2015–17	Skam	Eva Kviig Mohn	Norwegian
2018	Håbet a.k.a. Finding Home		Danish mini-series
