= Battle (2018 film) =

- Directed by: Katarina Launing
- Written by: Karsten Fullu; Maja Lunde
- Starring: Lisa Teige; Fabian Svegaard Tapia; Vebjørn Enger
- Distributed by: Netflix
- Release date: September 28, 2018
- Running time: 95 minutes
- Countries: Norway; Denmark; Netherlands; Sweden
- Languages: Norwegian; English

Battle is a 2018 drama film directed by Katarina Launing and written by Karsten Fullu and Maja Lunde.

== Plot ==
Dancer Amalie (Lisa Teige) is preparing for an upcoming dance competition, and all seems to be going well. Soon Amalie’s life takes a turn for the worse, though, putting her entire dance career at risk.

== Cast ==
- Lisa Teige as Amalie
- Fabian Svegaard Tapia as Mikael
- Vebjørn Enger as Aksel
- Stig R. Amdam as Bjørn
- Silje Marie Baltzersen as Ida
- Charlott Utzig as Charlotte
- Sofie Albertine Foss as Vanessa
- Georgia May Anta as Alex
- Sigyn Åsa Sætereng as Kim
- Morad Aziman as Josef
- Lucas Lute as The Loot
- Karen-Lise Mynster as Birgitta
- Bao Andre Nguyen as Moa
- Marius Vold as Elliot
- Rebekka Reienes Andresen as Camilla
