= Blank (TV series) =

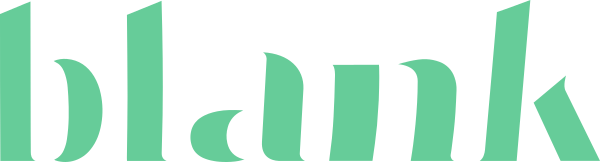
- Genre: Drama; Slice of life
- Created by: Knut Næsheim
- Written by: Knut Næsheim (season 1); Karianne Lund (season 2–3)
- Directed by: Knut Næsheim (season 1); Mikal Hovland (season 2–3)
- Starring: Cecilie Amlie Conesa; Ayyüce Kozanli; Alfred Ekker Strande
- Country of origin: Norway
- Original language: Norwegian
- No. of seasons: 3
- No. of episodes: 26

Production
- Producer: Åse Marie Hole
- Production locations: Oslo, Norway; Hadeland, Norway
- Running time: 16–43 minutes
- Production company: NRK

Original release
- Network: NRK3
- Release: 22 April 2018 – 22 December 2019

Blank is a Norwegian drama streaming television series about the daily lives of young adults after graduating from high school, and their coming of age. It was produced by NRK P3, which is part of the Norwegian public broadcaster NRK.

The series ended after its third season in 2019.

== Premise ==
After the worldwide success of Skam on the platform, NRK used the same format of release for Blank, meaning while the show was airing, a new clip, conversation, or social media post was published in real-time on the NRK website on a daily basis. Each season also focuses on particular topics, including relationships with friends and family, ethnicity, religion, romance, culture, and class differences. Blank also follows the tradition of focusing on one central character a season, however, unlike Skam, the main casts also change each season.

At the start of a week, a clip, conversation or social media post is posted on the Blank website. New material is posted on a daily basis, with the content unified and combined into one full episode on Sundays. The fictional characters have social media profiles where viewers can follow their activities.

== Cast and characters ==
=== Season 1 ===
- Cecilie Amlie Conesa as Ella Correia Midjo
- Maria Sunniva Aasen Sandvik as Susanne Gressum
- Jacob Fort as Simen Molstad
- William Greni Arnø as Mats Danielsen
- Mette Spjelkavik Enoksen as Louise
- Johan Hveem Maurud as Ragnar Henrikhaugen
- Kashayar Afshar as Parsa
- Ada Eide as Guro
- Erling Forland as Sussegutt
- Galvan Mehidi as Aref

=== Season 2 ===
- Ayyüce Kozanli as Zehra Demir
- Magnus Romkes Wold as Petter Heen
- Aima Hassan as Amina Iqbal
- Zoha Najeeb as Nadiya
- Sjur Vatne Brean as Martin
- Henrik Høven as Jakob
- Malin Landa as Celine
- Kristine Thorp as Selma
- Esrom Kidane as Daniel Kelati

=== Season 3 ===
- Alfred Ekker Strande as Markus Berg
- Sofie Albertine Foss as Karoline Ramstad
- Martin Lepperød as Fredrik
- Magan Gallery as Elias
- Ane Ulimoen Øverli as Ida Halvorsen
- Lea Myren as Jenny
- Oscar Wicken as Andreas
- Fredrik Ditlev-Simonsen as Eirik
- Rumen Raynov as Julian
- Eirik Hallert as Steinar
- Camilla Klaudiussen as Anna
- Nora Frølich as Julie

== Episodes ==
=== Series overview ===
Series	Episodes	Originally released	
Series	Episodes	First released	Last released
1	9	22 April 2018	23 June 2018
2	9	31 March 2019	2 June 2019
3	8	28 October 2019	22 December 2019

=== Season 1 (2018) ===
The first clip was made available on 14 April 2018, with the combined clips during the week premiering as a full episode on Sunday, 22 April 2018. The central character is Ella Correia Midjo, a 19-year-old girl who has decided to take a year off to work before starting college. The storyline deals with Ella's growing distance from her boyfriend, Mats, a student at the University of Oslo, her relationship with her roommate and best friend, Susanne, and her growing attraction towards coworker Simen.

No. overall	No. in season	Title	Duration	Original release date
1	1	"Skål for ung kjærlighet (Cheers to young love)"	43 min	22 April 2018
2	2	"Sees aldri (Never seen)"	28 min	29 April 2018
3	3	"Uten mål og mening (Without purpose and meaning)"	28 min	7 May 2018
4	4	"Opprørsstemning (Rebel mood)"	33 min	13 May 2018
5	5	"Som om ingenting har skjedd (As if nothing has happened)"	17 min	18 May 2018
6	6	"Glad vi ikke krangler (Glad we don't argue)"	16 min	3 June 2018
7	7	"Vet bare én ting (Know only one thing)"	28 min	10 June 2018
8	8	"Livet går videre (Life goes on)"	25 min	17 June 2018
9	9	"Ella Correia Midjo"	25 min	24 June 2018

=== Season 2 (2019) ===
The first clip was made available on 24 March 2019, with the combined clips airing as a full episode on Sunday, 31 March 2019. The main character is Zehra Demir, a 19-year-old Turkish-Norwegian girl who is struggling to balance the expectations of being a second-generation immigrant, expected to pursue pharmacology, with her true passion of music. Other subplots focus around slut-shaming, bodyshaming, anxiety, and interfaith relationships.

No. overall	No. in season	Title	Duration	Original release date
10	1	"Bare god stemning (Just good atmosphere)"	25 min	31 March 2019
11	2	"Dritt er veien til gull (Shit is the way to gold)"	23 min	7 April 2019
12	3	"Verden er skada (The world is damaged)"	20 min	14 April 2019
13	4	"Møtes ute (Meet outside)"	17 min	21 April 2019
14	5	"Satse alt (Bet everything)"	17 min	28 April 2019
15	6	"Spole tilbake (Rewind)"	18 min	12 May 2019
16	7	"Litt skummelt (A bit scary)"	18 min	19 May 2019
17	8	"Klarer ikke puste (Can't breathe)"	26 min	26 May 2019
18	9	"Zehra Demir"	19 min	2 June 2019

=== Season 3 (2019) ===
A trailer for the third season was released on 15 October 2019. The first clip was made available on 28 October 2019, with the first full episode of clips airing on Sunday, 3 November 2019. The central character is Markus Berg, a 19-year-old boy who has returned home to Hadeland after a failed stint in Oslo as an electrician. Markus used to be popular in high school, and now struggles to come to terms with the consequences of his actions and the growing distance to Karoline, his girlfriend who is still in high school, and beginning the Norwegian russ celebratory period. The main themes of the season are isolation, toxic masculinity, accountability, and adulthood.

No. overall	No. in season	Title	Duration	Original release date
19	1	"Det er Markus (It's Markus)"	30 min	3 November 2019
20	2	"Du er jo voksen (You are an adult)"	25 min	10 November 2019
21	3	"Et anna sted (Somewhere else)"	29 min	17 November 2019
22	4	"Ikke noen plan med Ida (No plan with Ida)"	22 min	24 November 2019
23	5	"Positiv vibe (Positive vibe)"	25 min	1 December 2019
24	6	"Det eneste jeg vil (The only thing I want)"	19 min	8 December 2019
25	7	"Akkurat som jeg trodde (Just as I thought)"	26 min	15 December 2019
26	8	"Det er ikke så farlig (It's no big deal)"	32 min	22 December 2019

== Production ==
After the success of Skam, a high school drama, NRK was interested in capturing the experiences of young adults entering the next part of their journey, particularly 19 year olds. Research and interviews the network conducted found that "many 19-year-olds are not well prepared for what awaits when the safe framework from growing up is gone. One in the age group told [NRK]: "I thought high school was difficult, but now I realize that life is difficult."

The first two seasons were filmed in Oslo, including scenes set at the University of Oslo and the Oslo Metropolitan University. The third season was set in Hadeland, and filmed scenes in and around the Hadeland upper secondary school. Students were utilized both as extras and production assistants.

Blank was conceived as a trilogy, with season 1 being about moving to the big city, season 2 talking about being young in a politically divided city, and season 3 focusing on being young in rural District Norway.

== Distribution ==
In Norway, the series is available on the radio channel NRK P3's website, and on the web television solution NRK TV. The weekly episodes were aired on Sundays on TV channel NRK3.
