= Ulrikke Falch =

Norwegian actress

- Born: 17 July 1996 (age 29); Oslo
- Education: Elvebakken Upper Secondary School
- Occupations: Actor, author

Ulrikke Falch (born 17 July 1996) is a Norwegian actress, author and public debater.

== Life and career ==
She is best known for her role as Vilde Lien Hellerud in the NRK series Skam. On social media, she has been involved in debates on body image and talked about her recovery from eating disorders. In 2017, the online newspaper Nettavisen named her one of the 25 most influential people on the internet in Norway.

In April 2018, Falch released a podcast through NRK P3, which covered everything from body image to religion. Later that year, in August 2018, she and co-author Sofie Frøysaa published the book Jenteloven ('Girl Law', a wordplay on Janteloven).

In August 2019, Falch came out with the documentary TV series F-ordet ('The F-word') on NRK, which tried to convince high school students that they were feminists.

Falch has had over a million followers on Instagram, but has in recent years withdrawn from social media. In March 2020, she deleted her account and did not return until one year later.

In June 2020, she released the documentary series Ulrikke uden SKAM ('Ulrikke without SKAM [lit. 'shame']') for the Danish channel TV 2 Play, which was never aired in Norway.

In 2021, she played the lead role of Line in the Swedish comedy-drama Ligga – konsten att komma över sitt ex ('Sleep [with] – the art of getting over your ex').

== Bibliography ==
- Jenteloven: Feministisk førstehjelp (with Sofie Frøysaa), Gyldendal, 2018, ISBN 9788205505872
