= Julie Andem =

Norwegian screenwriter, director, and television producer (born 1982)

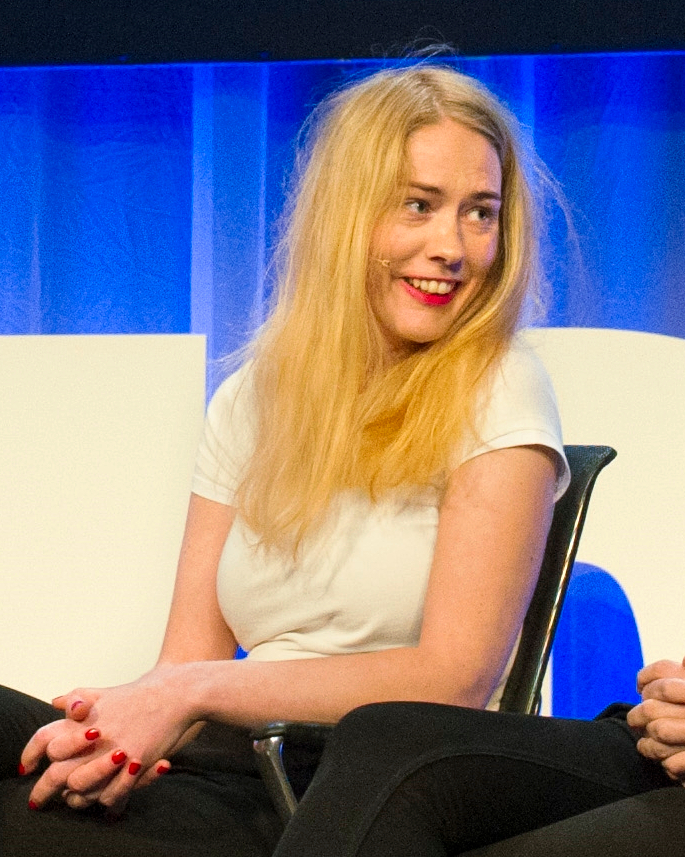
- Andem at Nordiske Mediedagers 2016
- Born: 4 July 1982 (age 44); Oslo, Norway
- Occupations: Screenwriter; Television producer Director
- Notable work: Skam; SKAM Austin
- Awards: Gullruten

Julie Annette Rovelstad Andem (born 4 July 1982) is a Norwegian screenwriter, director, and television producer. Andem is most famous for being the creator, screenwriter, director, and showrunner for the internationally acclaimed Norwegian young adult internet/television series Skam, which aired from 2015 to 2017 on Norway's public broadcasting network, NRK.

== Career ==
Andem worked in the children's division of NRK for several years. At NRK, she created and wrote the show Jenter, which means "girls" in Norwegian.

=== Skam ===
Skam began because NRK executives wanted to reach more teenage girls in its programming. Andem, along with Mari Magnus who later became the social media director of the series, spent six months traveling around Norway and interviewing teenagers about their lives. She auditioned over 1,200 young actors and then created characters around the cast.

Andem was the creator and showrunner of Skam, and she wrote and directed all 47 episodes throughout Skam's four seasons. Season 1 premiered on NRK in September 2015 and season 4 ended in June 2017.

The series was widely popular in Norway and globally. Many countries have made adaptations of Skam with Andem's storylines, including France's SKAM France, Germany's Druck, Italy's SKAM Italia, United States' SKAM Austin, Spain's SKAM España, Netherlands' SKAM NL, and Belgium's wtFOCK.

=== Other ventures ===
In October 2019, it was announced that Andem signed a two-year contract with HBO to create and develop shows for the network.

== Filmography ==
Year	Title	Country	Network	Creator	Showrunner	Screenwriter	Director
2013–2018	Jenter	Norway	NRK	Yes	Yes	Yes	Yes
2015–2017	Skam	Norway	NRK	Yes	Yes	Yes	Yes
2018	SKAM Austin	United States	Facebook Watch	Yes	Yes	Yes	Yes

== Awards ==
Year	Award	Category	Recipient	Result
2016	Gullruten	Best TV Drama	Skam	Won
2016	Gullruten	Innovation of the Year	Skam	Won
2016	Gullruten	Best New Show	Skam	Won
2016	Gullruten	Newcomer of the Year	Julie Andem; Mari Magnus	Won
2016	Foreningen Norden	Nordic Language Prize	Skam	Won
2016	C21Media International Drama Awards	Best Digital Original	Skam	Won
2017	Gullruten	Best TV drama	Skam	Nominated
2017	Gullruten	Best Writing for a Drama	Julie Andem	Won
2017	Gullruten	Best Directing for a Drama	Julie Andem	Won
2017	Gullruten	TV Moment of the Year	"O helga natt" from Skam (season 3)	Won
2017	Peer Gynt AS	Peer Gynt Prize	Skam	Won
2017	Nordiske Seriedagers Awards	Best Nordic TV Drama	Skam (season 4)	Won
2018	C21Media International Drama Awards	Best Digital Short Form Drama Series	SKAM Austin	Won
