= Førstegangstjenesten =

Norwegian comedy television series

- Genre: Comedy
- Created by: Herman Flesvig
- Written by: Herman Flesvig; Marit Støre Valeur; Rolf Magne Golten Andersen; Erlend Westnes; Åse Marie Hole; Karsten Fullu
- Directed by: Erlend Westnes
- Starring: Herman Flesvig; Jonas Kinge Bergland
- Country of origin: Norway
- Original language: Norwegian
- No. of seasons: 2
- No. of episodes: 12

Production
- Running time: 11–14 minutes

Original release
- Network: NRK
- Release: 13 December 2019

Førstegangstjenesten is a Norwegian comedy series airing on NRK, created and co-written by Herman Flesvig who stars as the four main characters. Its setting is the recruit school of the Norwegian Armed Forces.

NRK released two pilot episodes in December 2019. Modestly received by critics, the series thus far was given a "die throw" of 4 in VG and 3 in Dagbladet. However, in a matter of days, the two episodes had been streamed 370 000 and 335 000 times respectively. Thus NRK booked a full first season, with ten new episodes to be aired in 2020.

When released in October 2020, the new episodes had higher production value and received "die throws" of 5 in VG and 6 in Dagbladet.
