= Skam (TV series) =

Norwegian teen drama streaming television series

- Genre: Teen drama; Slice of life
- Created by: Julie Andem
- Developed by: Julie Andem
- Written by: Julie Andem
- Directed by: Julie Andem
- Starring: Lisa Teige; Josefine Frida Pettersen; Tarjei Sandvik Moe; Henrik Holm; Iman Meskini
- Composer: Christian Wibe
- Country of origin: Norway
- Original language: Norwegian
- No. of seasons: 4
- No. of episodes: 43

Production
- Producer: Marianne Furevold
- Production locations: Oslo, Norway
- Cinematography: Daniel McStay; Maja Holand; Ragnar Molstad
- Editors: Renate Henrikhaugen; Alec Thom; Ida Vennerød Kolstø; Stian Kjørstad Zethelius
- Running time: 15–59 minutes
- Production company: NRK

Original release
- Network: NRK1
- Release: 25 September 2015 – 24 June 2017

Related
- SKAM France; DRUCK; SKAM Italia; SKAM Austin; SKAM España; SKAM NL; wtFOCK; SRAM

Skam (stylized as SKAM; Norwegian pronunciation: [skɑm]; English: Shame) is a Norwegian teen drama series, created by Julie Andem for NRK P3. It follows the daily life of several teenagers who attend the Hartvig Nissen School, a gymnasium in the wealthy borough of Frogner in Oslo.

Despite little promotion ahead of its 2015 launch, Skam broke multiple viewership records in Norway. The first episode of season one is among the most-watched episodes in NRK's history, and Skam was responsible for half of NRK's online traffic by the release of the second season. With season three, the show had broken all streaming records in Norway, along with viewership records in neighboring countries Denmark, Finland, and Sweden. The show also attracted a significant international fanbase on social media, where fans reuploaded episodes of the show to other platforms with translated captions. It ended with its fourth season in 2017, and spawned multiple international adaptations.

== Release and promotion ==
When on air, a clip, conversation or social media post would be posted on the Skam website at the beginning of each week. New material from each episode would be posted on a daily basis, with the content unified and combined into one full episode on Fridays. The main character differs from season to season, and the fictional characters have social media profiles where viewers can follow their activities. The format has since been used in other NRK P3 series, such as Blank and Lovleg.

== Characters ==
The following are characters in Skam.

Character	Portrayed by	Seasons			
Character	Portrayed by	1	2	3	4
Eva Kviig Mohn	Lisa Teige	Central	Main	Recurring	Main
Noora Amalie Sætre	Josefine Frida Pettersen	Main	Central	Recurring	Main
Isak Valtersen	Tarjei Sandvik Moe	Main	Recurring	Central	Main
Sana Bakkoush	Iman Meskini	Main	Main	Main	Central
Christina "Chris" Berg	Ina Svenningdal [no; sv]	Main	Main	Recurring	Main
Vilde Hellerud Lien	Ulrikke Falch	Main	Main	Recurring	Main
Jonas Noah Vasquez	Marlon Langeland [da; sv]	Main	Recurring	Main	Recurring
William Magnusson	Thomas Hayes	Recurring	Main		Guest
Eskild Tryggvasson	Carl Martin Eggesbø [sv]		Main	Main	Recurring
Even Bech Næsheim	Henrik Holm			Main	Recurring
Magnus Fossbakken	David Stakston	Guest	Guest	Main	Recurring
Mahdi Disi	Sacha Kleber Nyiligira [sv]			Main	Recurring
Yousef Acar	Cengiz Al				Main
Christoffer "Penetrator-Chris" Schistad	Herman Tømmeraas	Recurring	Recurring	Guest	Guest
Ingrid Theis Gaupseth	Cecilie Martinsen	Recurring	Recurring	Guest	Recurring
Sara Nørstelien	Kristina Ødegaard	Recurring	Recurring	Guest	Recurring
Linn Larsen Hansen	Rakel Øfsti Nesje		Recurring	Recurring	Recurring
Mari Aspeflaten	Liv-Anne Trulsrud		Recurring		Guest
Emma W. Larzen	Ruby Dagnall [no; sv]			Recurring	Guest
Sonja	Theresa Frostad Eggesbø			Recurring	
Mikael Øverlie Boukhal	Yousef Hjelde Elmofty			Guest	Recurring
Elias Bakkoush	Simo Mohamed Elhbabi				Recurring
Adam Malik	Adam Ezzari [da]				Recurring
Mutasim Tatouti	Mutasim Billah				Recurring

^{1}In season one, David Stakston was credited as playing a character called David, though his name was never spoken in the show. This could be the character Magnus or Stakston was playing a different student. Stakston also makes an uncredited appearance in the last episode of season two.

^{2}In season three, Mikael appears uncredited in a video Isak finds on the Internet of Even.

=== Central cast ===
- Lisa Teige as Eva Kviig Mohn (born 2 June 1999) is the main character in the first season. When we first meet Eva, she recently started dating Jonas, who just ended a relationship with Eva's best friend Ingrid. Her relationship with Jonas is complicated and she finds it hard to trust him, eventually leading her to cheat on him and ultimately leading to their breakup at the end of season one. Eva lives at home with a busy mom and starts at the Hartvig Nissen school ("Nissen") in 2015 together with her friends and former classmates Jonas, Ingrid, Sara and Isak. Losing her former best friends Ingrid and Sara due to her relationship to Jonas, she starts up new friendships with Noora, Chris, Vilde and Sana at Nissen. After season one, Eva is mostly shown as an outgoing and promiscuous party-girl.
- Josefine Frida Pettersen as Noora Amalie Sætre (born 6 April 1999) is the main character in the second season. Noora is shown as a confident, smart and helpful character in seasons one and two. In the second season, it is however revealed that she has some insecurities after all. She lives with two roommates and does not have contact with her parents. Unlike her friends Eva, Chris and Vilde, Noora is not into drinking or hooking up with guys. When the school's playboy William continues to flirt with her despite several rejections, she eventually gets interested in him, but due to her prejudices against him, she finds it hard to accept. They end up in a relationship at the end of season two. In seasons three and four, Noora faces complications in her relationship with William.
- Tarjei Sandvik Moe as Isak Valtersen (born 21 June 1999) is the main character in the third season. Isak is a close friend of both Eva and Jonas in season one. At the end of the season, Noora and Eva find gay pornography on Isak's phone, raising suspicions about his sexual orientation. Season three follows Isak's struggles to accept his sexuality. He meets Even, and the two quickly fall in love and begin to secretly see each other. However, Isak unknowingly pushes Even (who has bipolar disorder) away by revealing that he does not want to be around people with mental disorders, due to traumatizing experiences with Isak's own mentally ill mother. Isak decides to come out to his best friends and tell them about Even. His friends help him getting back together with Even and afterwards to better understand and accept Even's bipolar disorder. In season four, Isak is shown as much happier, as he lives comfortably and publicly in a relationship with Even.
- Iman Meskini as Sana Bakkoush (born 24 December 1999) is the main character in the fourth season. Sana's biggest struggle throughout the series is to live the traditional Muslim lifestyle and the traditional Norwegian gymnasium-lifestyle at the same time. Sana is shown as decisive and eloquent, but faces constant prejudices from her classmates, her parents and people she meets on the street, which sometimes leads Sana to take irrational decisions. This peaks when Sana anonymously cyberbullies her classmate Sara, who wants to exclude Sana from their russefeiring-squad. Unlike Eva, Noora and Isak, she has a close relationship with her family. In season 4, she falls in love with Yousef, who she initially thinks is a Muslim, but turns out not to be. After initial attempts to distance herself from him, they appear to grow closer later in the season.

=== Main cast ===
- Marlon Valdés Langeland as Jonas Noah Vasquez (born 20 December 1999), Eva's boyfriend in the first season. He is also Isak's best friend and a classmate of all the main characters.
- Ulrikke Falch as Vilde Hellerud Lien (born 13 July 1999), the naive fourth member of the main girl squad. She is the enthusiastic initiator of russefeiring, revy and other social events for the squad.
- Ina Svenningdal as Christina "Chris" Berg (born 6 January 1999), the amusing fifth member of the girl squad. She usually avoids most conflicts and emotionally deep conversations.
- Thomas Hayes as William Magnusson (born 10 January 1997), the flirt and eventually boyfriend of Noora in the second season. He is two years older than the main cast, but also studies at Nissen in the first two seasons.
- Carl Martin Eggesbø as Eskild Tryggvasson (born 19 August 1995), the roommate of Noora in season two and four, and of Isak's in season three.
- Henrik Holm as Even Bech Næsheim (born 12 February 1997), the love affair and eventual boyfriend of Isak. Even is diagnosed with bipolar disorder at some point prior to season 3.
- David Stakston as Magnus Fossbakken (born 30 October 1999), Isak's awkward friend and classmate. In the fourth season he is in a relationship with Vilde.
- Sacha Kleber Nyiligira as Mahdi Disi (born 19 January 1999), Isak's friend and classmate. Member of the boys squad.
- Cengiz Al as Yousef Acar (born 21 September 1997), the atheist love interest of Sana and a former classmate of Even.

=== Recurring cast ===
- Herman Tømmeraas as Christoffer "Penetrator-Chris" Schistad (born 2 April 1997), the on-and-off love interest of Eva through all four seasons. He is also classmate and best friend of William.
- Cecilie Martinsen as Ingrid Theis Gaupseth (born 23 February 1999), Jonas's girlfriend and Eva's best friend prior to season one. Ingrid is a member of the russefeiring-squad "Pepsi Max", which often rivals the main characters' squad.
- Kristina Ødegaard as Sara Nørstelien (born 12 July 1999), Ingrid's best friend and leader of the "Pepsi Max" squad. Sara dates Isak in the second season.
- Rakel Øfsti Nesje as Linn Larsen Hansen (born 1 January 1996), the introverted roommate of Eskild and Noora/Isak.
- Simo Mohamed Elhbabi as Elias Bakkoush (born 5 March 1997), Sana's older brother and Yousef's best friend and former classmate.

== Episodes ==
=== Series overview ===
Series	Episodes	Originally released	
Series	Episodes	First released	Last released
1	11	25 September 2015	11 December 2015
2	12	4 March 2016	3 June 2016
3	10	7 October 2016	16 December 2016
4	10	14 April 2017	24 June 2017

=== Season 1 ===
The first clip from season 1 was made available on Tuesday, 22 September 2015, with the combined clips during the week premiering as a full episode on Friday, 25 September 2015. The season consists of 11 episodes; the main character is Eva Mohn. The storyline deals with Eva's difficult relationship with her boyfriend Jonas and the themes of loneliness, identity, belonging and friendship.

No. overall	No. in season	Title	Duration	Original release date
1	1	"Du ser ut som en slut (You look like a slut)"	20 min	25 September 2015
2	2	"Jonas, dette er helt dust (Jonas, this is totally dumb)"	17 min	2 October 2015
3	3	"Vi er de største loserne på skolen (We're the biggest losers at school)"	17 min	9 October 2015
4	4	"Go for it din lille slut (Go for it, you little slut)"	15 min	16 October 2015
5	5	"Hva er det som gjør deg kåt? (What turns you on?)"	19 min	23 October 2015
6	6	"Man vet når gutter lyver (You know when a boy is lying)"	23 min	30 October 2015
7	7	"Tenker alltid det er meg det er noe gale med (I always think it's me there's something wrong with)"	20 min	13 November 2015
8	8	"Hele skolen hater meg (The whole school hates me)"	24 min	20 November 2015
9	9	"Man er det man gjør (You are what you do)"	21 min	27 November 2015
10	10	"Jeg tenker du har blitt helt psyko (I think that you've become totally psycho)"	21 min	4 December 2015
11	11	"Et jævlig dumt valg (A really stupid choice)"	35 min	11 December 2015

=== Season 2 ===
The first clip from season 2 was made available on Monday, 29 February 2016, with the combined clips during the week premiering as a full episode on Friday, 4 March 2016. The season consists of 12 episodes; the main character is Noora Amalie Sætre. The season is about her relationship with William and deals with issues of friendship, feminism, eating disorders, self-image, violence, sexual violence and the contemporaneous refugee crisis in relation to Norwegian democracy.

No. overall	No. in season	Title	Duration	Original release date
12	1	"Om du bare hadde holdt det du lovet (If only you'd kept your promises)"	26 min	4 March 2016
13	2	"Du lyver til en venninne og skylder på meg (You lie to a friend and blame me)"	26 min	11 March 2016
14	3	"Er det noe du skjuler for oss? (Are you hiding something from us?)"	36 min	18 March 2016
15	4	"Jeg visste det var noe rart med henne (I knew there was something strange about her) (Easter Special)"	29 min	25 March 2016
16	5	"Jeg er i hvert fall ikke sjalu (I'm certainly not jealous)"	32 min	1 April 2016
17	6	"Jeg vil ikke bli beskytta (I don't want to be protected)"	24 min	22 April 2016
18	7	"Noora, du trenger pikk (Noora, you need cock)"	24 min	29 April 2016
19	8	"Du tenker bare på William (You're only thinking of William)"	41 min	6 May 2016
20	9	"Jeg savner deg så jævlig (I miss you so damn much)"	22 min	13 May 2016
21	10	"Jeg skal forklare alt (I'll explain everything)"	49 min	20 May 2016
22	11	"Husker du seriøst ingenting? (Do you seriously remember nothing?)"	30 min	27 May 2016
23	12	"Vil du flytte sammen med meg? (Will you move in with me?)"	50 min	3 June 2016

=== Season 3 ===
The first clip from season 3 was made available on Sunday, 2 October 2016, with the combined clips during the week premiering as a full episode on Friday, 7 October 2016. The season consists of 10 episodes; the main character is Isak Valtersen. The season deals with Isak's burgeoning relationship with Even Bech Næsheim and is principally a coming out story that deals with issues of love, sexual identity, authenticity, mental illness, religion and friendship.

No. overall	No. in season	Title	Duration	Original release date
24	1	"Lykke til, Isak (Good luck, Isak)"	27 min	7 October 2016
25	2	"Du er over 18, sant? (You're over 18, right?)"	26 min	14 October 2016
26	3	"Nå bånder dere i overkant mye" / "Hun er på (You're bonding too much/She is on)"	22 min	21 October 2016
27	4	"Keen på å bade" / "Da vorser vi sammen? (Feel like swimming/Then we pre-party together?)"	20 min	28 October 2016
28	5	"Samme tid et helt annet sted" / "Kan jeg bli her med deg for altid? (At the same time in a completely different place/Can I stay here with you forever?)"	30 min	4 November 2016
29	6	"Escobar season" / "Kan du ikke bare si det? (Escobar season/Can't you just say it?)"	19 min	18 November 2016
30	7	"Er du homo? (Are you gay?)"	23 min	25 November 2016
31	8	"Mannen i mitt liv" / "Drit i å ringe Isak (The man of my dreams/Stop fucking calling Isak)"	30 min	2 December 2016
32	9	"Det går over" / "Velkommen til mobilsvar (It will pass/Welcome to voicemail)"	18 min	9 December 2016
33	10	"Minutt for minutt" / "Jeg så deg første skoledag (Minute by minute/I saw you the first day of school)"	33 min	16 December 2016

- NRK TV and NRK P3 used different titles for 7 of the season 3 episodes.

=== Season 4 ===
The first clip from season 4 was made available on Monday, 10 April 2017, with the combined clips during the week premiering as a full episode on Friday, 14 April 2017. The season consisted of 10 episodes, and the main character is Sana Bakkoush. The season deals with the Islamic religion, forbidden love, cyberbullying, friendship, and the Norwegian russ celebratory period.

The series finale episode switches character clip-to-clip, focusing on short stories by characters not given their own, full season. The episode deals with parental depression, love rejection, jealousy, friendship, mutual relationship support, and fear of abandonment.

No. overall	No. in season	Title	Duration	Original release date
34	1	"Du hater å henge med oss (You hate hanging out with us)"	25 min	14 April 2017
35	2	"Jeg er gutt, jeg får ikke hat (I'm a boy, I don't get hate)"	18 min	21 April 2017
36	3	"Hva mener du om drikking? (What do you think about drinking?)"	28 min	28 April 2017
37	4	"Allah hadde digget deg (Allah would dig you)"	30 min	5 May 2017
38	5	"Hvis du er trist er jeg trist (If you're sad then I'm sad)"	27 min	12 May 2017
39	6	"Har du en dårlig dag? (Are you having a bad day?)"	30 min	26 May 2017
40	7	"Vi må stå sammen (We must stand together)"	36 min	2 June 2017
41	8	"De største loserne på skolen (The biggest losers at school)"	35 min	9 June 2017
42	9	"Livet smiler (Life smiles)"	48 min	16 June 2017
43	10	"Takk for alt (Thanks for everything)"	59 min	24 June 2017

== Production ==
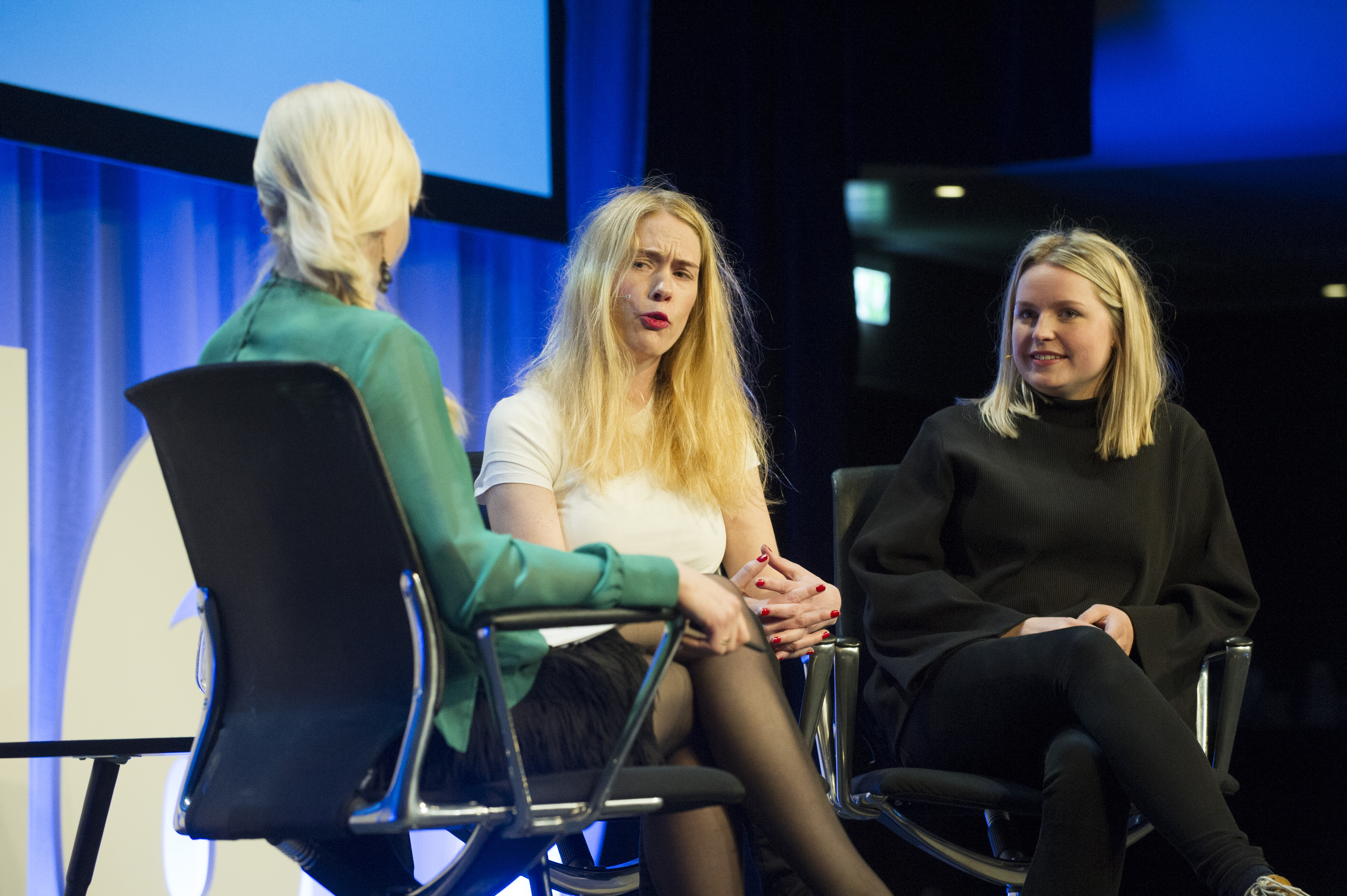
Julie Andem and Mari Magnus

Julie Andem created Skam. In an interview with Rushprint in April 2016, Andem discussed production of the series. Originally developed for 16-year-old girls, Andem made use of the "NABC" production model ("Needs/Approach/Benefit/Competition"), and instead of collecting information from a vast amount of sources, she had extensive, hours-long interviews with a single representative to uncover what needs that specific target audience had in order to cover that story. In contrast to American shows, which were the primary competition for shows attracting attention from teenagers, Andem stated that she had one advantage; knowing who the audience were and what culture they grew up in. One major area of exploration Andem found through research was pressure; she stated that "the pressure to perform is very high for this target audience. They strive to perform in so many ways. That's fine, and it doesn't necessarily have to be dangerous or unhealthy. But what is unhealthy is that many feel like they can't live up to the demands, and therefore feel that they failed. They are comparing themselves to each other, not themselves. And then a thought occurred: How to get them to let go of the pressure through a series like Skam". Andem wanted the show to be a combination of social realism, soap opera, and sitcom, transitioning between the genres as the scenes switch, for example from the comical scenes of a doctor's office to the make-out scenes on the stairs. She admitted it did not always work, saying that one particular scene change in episode 5 of season 1 from the stairs to the doctor's office was "a dramatic jump", and elaborated that "in a later scene, I told the photographer that we maybe should try to go a little closer. But we didn't get the humor, so: fuckit, we'll shoot sitcom-ish and blend the genres."

Andem created nine characters, without any backstory. Everyone was supposed to be able to lead a season, and the show was going to switch character season-to-season. 1,200 people auditioned for the roles in the first round of casting. As production started, Andem wrote scripts for the shows, and there was no improvisation. "A lot of people think much of the show is improvised. It's not. A lot is written for the actors. And before and after a scene, I'll wait for a while before I say thank you and let them play a little in the scene. If a scene doesn't work, we'll fix it and see what in the script doesn't work." Production had a short deadline, with scripts written in three days, one-and-a-half days to shoot, and four-to-five days to edit. "The plan must be there, and we just have to finish through". The series' use of real-time was planned from early on, and Andem wrote the series in episodic format, although the content also had to work for daily releases, including a cliffhanger ending in each scene. Andem read the comments for each day, and looked for feedback from the audience on how to end each season while still keeping her original plans in some way.

As the series premiered, there was little or no promotion for the show, due to the production's and NRK's wish for teenagers to find it on their own, spread the news through social media, and avoid the older generation even noticing the series. There were no launch interviews, no reviews, and the actors were shielded from the media, with NRK P3 editorial chief Håkon Moslet saying that "We want most of the focus to be on the show. These actors are very young, I think it's good they're being shielded a little. They do also notice the popularity of the series".

The Norwegian newspaper Dagbladet reported in December 2016 that the production of seasons 2 and 3 of Skam had cost a combined sum of NOK10 million. NRK P3 editorial chief Håkon Moslet stated: "For being a drama of high quality, Skam is a very cost-efficient production."

In December 2016, the series was renewed for a fourth season. In early April 2017, it was announced that the first clip from the fourth season would premiere on 10 April, and that it would be the last season of the series. NRK P3 editorial chief Håkon Moslet stated that the making of Skam had been "an extreme sport", and in an Instagram post, creator, writer and director Julie Andem wrote that "Skam has been a 24/7 job. It has also been amazingly fun to work on, and I really believe that has given the series a unique energy, and ensured that Skam continues to surprise and entertain. We recently decided that we won't be making a new season this fall. I know many of you out there will be upset and disappointed to hear this, but I'm confident this is the right decision."

On 23 June 2017, one day before the series finale, the entire cast officially met the press before the series' wrap party, answering questions from fans around the world and describing their experiences and memories from production. It was notably the first time all the actors were allowed to break their silence and speak to the public.

On 9 December 2018, NRK published the first of four official blooper reels from the series. The 9 December release featured never-before-seen content from the first season, with the remaining three blooper videos released throughout the following week.

== Distribution ==
In Norway, the series is available on the radio channel NRK P3's website, and on the web television solution NRK TV. The weekly episodes are also aired on Fridays on TV channel NRK3. The series has been licensed to air as a Nordvision co-production by public service broadcasters in other Nordic countries, specifically:

- In Denmark, the series is shown by DR on the DR TV streaming service and aired on TV channel DR3 since December 2016.
- In Finland, the series is shown by Yle on the Yle Areena streaming service since December 2016.
- In Iceland, the series is shown by RÚV on both its streaming service and television channel.
- In Sweden, the series is shown by SVT on the SVT Play streaming service since December 2016.

== Reception ==
Skam received critical acclaim and significant recognition for its portrayal of sexual abuse in the second season and homosexuality in the third. The series was also praised for its contributions to promote Norwegian language and culture internationally, as well as for its unique distribution format, adopting a new strategy of real-time, high-engagement, snippet-based distribution rather than rigidity and television schedules. It received multiple Norwegian awards throughout its run, being honored for its dramatic narrative, innovative storytelling format, writing, directing, and actors' performances.

=== Norway and Nordic countries ===
In Norway, on average, about 192,000 viewers watched the first season, with the first episode being one of the most viewed of all time on NRK TV online. In the first week of June 2016, streaming of Skam was responsible for over half of the traffic on NRK TV. Following the release of the third-season finale, NRK stated that the second season had an average audience of 531,000, while the third season broke all streaming records on its NRK TV service with an average audience of 789,000 people. The trailer for the fourth season, released on 7 April 2017, was watched by 900,000 people within four days. During the start of the fourth season, 1.2 million unique users had visited Skam's website, and the first episode had been watched by 317,000 people. NRK P3 editorial chief Håkon Moslet told Verdens Gang that "We see that there is high traffic and high interest for season 4. Since the end of the season we have seen a pattern around viewer interest. We lie high in the first week and towards the end of the season when the drama kicks in." In May 2017, NRK published a report on 2016 viewing statistics, writing that the third season broke both the streaming record for a series on NRK TV and for streaming of any series in Norway.

An October 2016 Aftenposten report detailed that Skam had become popular in Sweden, with "well over 5000" viewers with Swedish IP addresses watching the episodes, not counting the individual clips. A later report from Verdens Gang in January 2017 stated that Skam had "broken all records" in Sweden, with over 25 million plays on SVT Play. Following the series' licensing deal for broadcasting in Denmark, the series broke records in January 2017, with the show's first episode scoring 560,000 viewers on DR TV. In Finland, the first episode had more than 130,000 views by the end of February 2017, two and half months after its release, described by Yle audience researcher Anne Hyvärilä as "quite exceptional".

Skam has received critical acclaim. The newspaper NATT&DAG selected it as the best TV series of 2015. In its second season, Kripos, Norway's National Criminal Investigation Service, praised the series' handling of sexual abuse, including the girls' encouraging the victim, Noora, to go to the emergency room to explain the situation and gather evidence of the abuse, and Noora confronting her abuser with relevant laws he has broken to prevent the sharing of photographs showing her naked. The National Center for Prevention of Sexual Assault also praised the portrayal, adding that they wish for the series to become a syllabus in schools. In the third season, Martine Lunder Brenne of Verdens Gang praised the theme of homosexuality and wrote that "I praise it first and foremost because young homosexual people, both in and outside the closet, finally get some long-awaited and modern role models. It doesn't matter if it's a character in a fictional drama – right now, Skam is Norway's coolest show". In the fourth season, Christopher Pahle of Dagbladet praised a conversation about religion, writing: "two young people, with Muslim backgrounds, have a reflected, respectful and enlightening conversation about religion without arguing or taking it to the trenches. Think about that. They pick flowers and dribble a ball, and even if they don't necessarily convince each other, that's not the purpose either. The point is that they understand each other".

Skam has been recognised for its contributions to promote Norwegian language and culture, and to foster affinity between Nordic countries. In December 2016, the Nordic Association awarded Skam the annual Nordic Language Prize for its ability to engage a young Nordic audience, connecting with young people across the Nordic region and fostering positive attitudes about the region's neighbouring languages. In April 2017, Skam and its creator Julie Andem were awarded the Peer Gynt Prize, an award given to a person or institution that has had a positive impact on society and made Norway famous abroad. The show also led to popularisation of the word lø, which was noted by the Norwegian Language Council in 2016 when it chose it as one of the words of the year.

In June 2017, just prior to the show's ending, Aftenposten published a report featuring interviews with many well-known Norwegian television creators, writers and directors, all praising Skam showrunner Julie Andem for her creative work on the show. Praise was directed at the series' "unpolished" nature, her ability to maintain "such a high level of quality over a long period of time", the series' blend of different sexualities and ethnicities and use of dialogue to resolve issues, and the show's compassion, thereby its ability to truly capture its generational audience.

The show's series finale received positive reviews. Vilde Sagstad Imeland of Verdens Gang praised the final clip for being a "worthy and emotional ending". Cecilie Asker of Aftenposten wrote that "The very last episode of Skam leaves us with a big sorrow, a sore loss, and a craving for more. It couldn't have been better."

On 1 July 2017, during the celebration of Oslo Pride, Skam, its creator Julie Andem, and actors Tarjei Sandvik Moe, Henrik Holm and Carl Martin Eggesbø were awarded the "Fryd" award, an award given to persons or organizations that break the norms in gender and sexuality in a positive manner.

In February 2018, Prince William and Catherine, the then-Duke and Duchess of Cambridge and members of the British royal family, visited the Hartvig Nissen school to meet with the cast and learn more about Skam, its impact on the actors' lives and to discuss youth and mental health.

=== International success ===
Starting with season three, the show attracted an international audience, and NRK was therefore heavily asked to add English subtitles to the Skam episodes online. The requests were declined due to the license for the music presented throughout the series being restricted to a Norwegian audience, and that easy availability outside Norway would violate the terms of NRK's license agreements. An attorney for NRK elaborated that YouTube videos featuring more than 50% original Skam content would be automatically removed. When denied official subtitling, fans started making their own translations of the episodes into several world languages, greatly expanding the online fanbase. Norwegian viewers were quick to share translated clips quickly after availability through Google Drive, and also started blogs to cover additional material and language courses to explain Norwegian slang.

By the end of 2016, Skam had been trending globally several times on Twitter and Tumblr, and its Facebook, Instagram and Vine presence grew rapidly. On social media, fandoms developed creative paintings, screensavers, phone covers, and fan videos. Filming locations, including Sagene Church, and the Hartvig Nissen school, were visited by fans, and the actors were receiving worldwide attention. After being featured in an episode in the third season, Gabrielle's song "5 fine frøkner" saw a 3,018 percent increase in listening on Spotify, with over 13 million streams and, at one point, rising to eighth place on the Swedish top music rankings. Its social media popularity continued into its fourth season in April 2017, with over 20,000 tweets containing #skamseason4 registered in 24 hours at the time of season four's first clip, a substantial portion of which originated from the United States.

In January 2017, Skam was geoblocked for foreign viewers. NRK attorney Kari Anne Lang-Ree stated that "NRK has a right to publish content to the Norwegian audience and foreign countries. The music industry is reacting to the fact that many international viewers are listening to music despite NRK not having international licensing deals. NRK takes the concerns from the music industry seriously. We are in dialogue with [the music industry] to find a solution". NRK stated that "We want to thank our international fans and followers who have embraced SKAM. We are blown away by your dedication – it is something we never expected. That is why it hurts to tell you guys that due to a necessary clarification with the music right holders, SKAM will until further notice not be available outside Norway. We are working hard to figure out how to solve this issue so that the fans can continue to enjoy SKAM from where they are". When the fourth season premiered in April, the geoblock was removed for Nordic countries.

The series has received significant attention from international media publications for its unique distribution model of real-time snippet-based information.

Anna Leszkiewicz of New Statesman posted in March 2017 that she considered Skam "the best show on TV", highlighting the second season's handling of sexual assault. She praised the series for avoiding "shocking, gratuitous rape scenes", instead focusing on a single hand gesture by abuser Nico as a sign of predatory behavior. However, Leszkiewicz criticized the show for taking the "escape route", in which Noora finds the courage to speak to another girl who was at the party, who insists that, while Noora and Nico were in bed together, no sexual intercourse took place. Leszkiewicz commented that "So many women go through what Noora went through in Skam. Most of them don't get offered the same escape route. Instead, they have to live with the shame and confusion of an 'ambiguous' assault." The same month, Elite Daily's Dylan Kickham wrote that the international fanbase for Skam on social media was "much larger than I ever would have predicted", with major fan groups on Twitter, Facebook, and Tumblr. He credited the third season's storyline of homosexuality, calling it "incredibly intimate and profound", particularly praising a scene featuring a conversation about flamboyant attitudes between main character Isak and supporting character Eskild. While acknowledging highlights of the past two seasons, Kickham explained that "season three stands above the rest by shining a light on aspects of sexuality that are very rarely depicted in mainstream media", praising Eskild's "magnificent and timely take on the toxic 'masc-for-masc' discrimination within the gay community" in response to Isak's homophobic comments. "It's these small, incisive moments that show just how much Skam understands and cares about the issues it portrays", explained Kickham.

In March 2017, voters of E! Online's poll regarding "Top Couple 2017" declared characters Isak and Even, main stars of the show's third season, the winners. Verdens Gang wrote in April that Skam had become popular in China, where publicly discussing homosexuality is illegal. It reported that almost four million Chinese people had watched the third season through piracy and a total of six million had watched all episodes so far translated to Chinese. The report also stated that NRK has no plans to stop piracy in China, and NRK P3 editorial chief Håkon Moslet told Verdens Gang that "It was Isak and Even that captured a young Chinese audience. There's a lot of censorship in China, and they are role models and have a relationship that Chinese people have a need to see."

Anna Leszkiewicz wrote three more articles on Skam and its impact between April and December 2017. In the first report, she credited the series for having tackled multiple difficult topics with the use of universal emotions like loneliness rather than issue-based strategies. In the second, she specifically focused on the series' ending, noting that it originally had nine characters designed to each lead a season, and quoted fans with the sentiment that "It seems like such an abrupt decision. It doesn't serve the storyline at all." Acknowledging the pressure of the show's global popularity as potentially a key element to end Skam, Leszkiewicz highlighted some fans' disapproval of the storylines presented towards the ending; season four's main character Sana, a member of the Muslim religion who had been under-represented in the series, had a shorter amount of focus in her season than other main characters had at their respective times; the final moments of the series focused on short stories by characters not given their own season, one of which told the story of a minor character without significant relevancy to the series; and a lackluster conversation about Islamophobia between Sana and her white, non-Muslim friend Isak. Leszkiewicz quoted disgruntled fans, one of which said that "Sana has been disrespected and disregarded and erased and sidelined and that is fucking gross. She deserved better". Finally, in her last report, she focused on Skam's legacy as an American adaption was in production. NRK P3 editorial chief Håkon Moslet told her that "There was a lot of piracy", acknowledging that the show's global popularity was the result of fans illegally distributing content through Google Drive, though adding "But we didn't mind". Producer and project manager Marianne Furevold explained that "We were given a lot of time to do so much research, and I think that's a huge part of the success that we see today with Skam", referencing extensive in-depth interviews, attending schools and youth clubs, and immersing into teenagers' online lives, something that she did not think would have been possible with a commercial network. In regards to ending the series after its fourth season, while its popularity peaked, Moslet told Leszkiewicz that writer Julie Andem spent an enormous amount of time developing the series; "It was kind of an extreme sport to make, this series, especially for her. It was her life, 24/7, for two and a half years. It was enough, I think. And she wanted to end on a high. So that's the reason. I think it was the right thing". Andem had posted on Instagram that she "wouldn't have been able to make a season five as good as it deserved to be", though she had also written that she did not want to give away the producing job of the American version, opting to take on the responsibility of that adaptation. That decision itself disgruntled fans, who "found her decision to leave the Norwegian series just to take on another huge commitment with the American show disappointing". Moslet praised the series' diverse set of characters, concluding with the statement that "At a time of confusion and intolerance, it seems more important than ever" for content creators to embrace diversity and reject intolerant attitudes.

In December 2017, Tumblr released its list of the most talked-about shows of the year on its platform, with Skam topping the chart as number one, outranking hugely successful American series, such as Game of Thrones, Stranger Things, and The Walking Dead.

=== Scholarship ===
SKAM has been the subject of numerous academic studies. Vilde Schanke Sundet argues that the real-time quality of shows like SKAM help broadcasters to reconnect with younger audiences, and has examined viewers motives for engaging with the community online. Other scholars, such as Tore Rye Andersen and Sara Tanderup Linkis, analyse the narrative effect of what Ruth Page calls "real-time narration", while Jill Walker Rettberg analysed the use of social media narrative to include the viewer in a "we-narrative", a collective narration that emphasises the group above the individual.

=== Awards and nominations ===
Year	Organization	Category	Nominee(s)	Result	Ref.
2016	Gullruten	Best TV Drama	—N/a	Won	
2016	Gullruten	Best New Program Series	—N/a	Won	
2016	Gullruten	Innovation of the Year	—N/a	Won	
2016	Gullruten	Best Film Editing for a TV Drama	Ida Vennerød Kolstø	Won	
2016	Gullruten	Newcomer of the Year	Julie Andem; Mari Magnus	Won	
2016	Gullruten	Audience Award	Noora (Josefine Pettersen)	Nominated	
2016	C21Media International Drama Awards	Best Digital Original	—N/a	Won	
2016	Foreningen Norden	Nordic Language Prize	—N/a	Won	
2017	Gullruten	Best TV Drama	—N/a	Nominated	
2017	Gullruten	Best Actor	Tarjei Sandvik Moe	Nominated	
2017	Gullruten	Best Writing for a Drama	Julie Andem	Won	
2017	Gullruten	Best Directing for a Drama	Julie Andem	Won	
2017	Gullruten	TV Moment of the Year	"O helga natt"	Won	
2017	Gullruten	Audience Award	Henrik Holm; Tarjei Sandvik Moe	Won	
2017	Peer Gynt AS	Peer Gynt Prize	—N/a	Won	
2017	Nordiske Seriedagers Awards	Best Nordic TV-drama	Skam season 4	Won	

== Other media ==
=== Adaptations ===
In December 2016, Simon Fuller's XIX Entertainment production company signed a deal with NRK to produce an American version of the series, then-titled Shame. Development of the series continued in the following months, with a title change to SKAM Austin, casting calls taking place, and the announcement that Austin would air on Facebook's "Facebook Watch" original video platform and on the original's series network, NRK. It premiered in April 2018 and has been renewed for a second season.

In April 2017, the Danish theatre Aveny-T was reported to have acquired exclusive rights to produce a stage version of Skam. Four different plays will be made, one for each season, with the first show having taken place in Copenhagen on 15 September 2017, and the remaining three plays produced once a year through the year 2020.

In September 2017, French entertainment website AlloCiné reported on the imminent production of a French remake of the series.

In October 2017, Variety and The Hollywood Reporter reported that local adaptations of Skam would be produced in five European countries; Germany, France, Italy, Spain and the Netherlands. NRK CEO Thor Gjermund Eriksen said in a statement that "We are very excited about the tremendous interest that Skam/Shame has generated outside of Norway. The creators of Skam aimed to help 16-year-old-girls strengthen their self-esteem through dismantling taboos, making them aware of interpersonal mechanisms and showing them the benefits of confronting their fears. This is a vision we are proud to bring to other countries". Variety notes that each local production will be required to do its own local research into the dilemmas and dreams of its teenagers, rather than copying the original Norwegian production.

In October 2018, Belgium began airing its own adaptation.

On 3 April 2019, the educational Swedish broadcasting channel UR began broadcasting the first seasons of Druck (as Skam Deutschland), Skam España, and Skam France.

In April 2024. a Croatian remake was announced, marking the first Eastern European adaptation of the series. It was premiered on 27 October 2024.

Having achieved success, multiple remakes have been renewed for additional seasons, progressing in development at different speeds.

==== Counterparts ====
Currently airing season
Adaptation no longer in production
Upcoming season announced
Status of season/adaptation unknown

Country	Local title	Network	Premiere	Setting	Seasonal main character											
Country	Local title	Network	Premiere	Setting	1	2	3	4	5	6	7	8	9	10	11	12
Norway	SKAM	NRK TV; NRK3	25 September 2015	Hartvig Nissen School, Oslo	Eva Mohn	Noora Sætre	Isak Valtersen	Sana Bakkoush	Ended							
France	SKAM France	France.tv Slash; France 4	5 February 2018	Lycée Dorian, Paris	Emma Borgès	Manon Demissy	Lucas Lallemant	Imane Bakhellal	Arthur Broussard (Note: Skam France was the first in the franchise to continue past the original 4 season story, and create a brand new story with the character of Arthur (Mahdi's counterpart).)	Lola Lecomte (Note: Skam France season 6 was the first to introduce a main character who did not have a counterpart in the original series with Lola Lecomte, Daphné's (Vilde's counterpart) younger sister. With the start of Lola's season, Skam France focused on a "second generation" of original characters.)	Tiffany Prigent	Bilal Cherif	Maya Etienne	Anaïs Rocha	Rym Brahimi (Note: With Skam France season 11, the series again shifts focus to a new class of younger, original characters at Lycée Dorian. This is considered the beginning of the "third generation" of Skam France, according to official promotional materials.)	Maël Le Gall
Belgium (Wallonia)	SKAM France	RTBF Auvio; La Trois	5 February 2018	Lycée Dorian, Paris	Emma Borgès	Manon Demissy	Lucas Lallemant	Imane Bakhellal	Arthur Broussard	Lola Lecomte	Tiffany Prigent	Bilal Cherif	Maya Etienne	Anaïs Rocha	Rym Brahimi	Maël Le Gall
Germany	DRUCK	funk ZDFneo	24 March 2018	Barnim-Gymnasium, Berlin	Hanna Jung	Mia Winter	Matteo Florenzi	Amira Mahmood	Nora Machwitz (Note: From Season 5 onwards, Druck introduced a new generation of original characters, beginning with Kiki's (Vilde's counterpart) younger sister Nora.)	Fatou Jallow	Isi Inci	Mailin Richter	Ended			
Italy	SKAM Italia	TIMvision (s. 1–3) Netflix (s. 4–6)	29 March 2018	Liceo J. F. Kennedy, Rome	Eva Brighi	Martino Rametta (Note: Skam Italia switched the order of the season main characters compared to other productions, such that Martino (Isak's counterpart) is the main character of season 2 and Eleonora (Noora's counterpart) is the main character of season 3.)	Eleonora Sava	Sana Allagui	Elia Santini	Asia Giovannelli (Note: Asia Giovannelli is an original character who does not have a counterpart in the original Skam.)	Ended					
United States	SKAM Austin	Facebook Watch	27 April 2018	Bouldin High School, Austin, Texas	Megan Flores	Grace Olsen	Ended									
Spain	SKAM España	Movistar+	16 September 2018	Instituto Isabel la Católica, Madrid	Eva Vázquez Villanueva	Cris Soto Peña (Note: Skam España switched the order of the season main characters, so that Cristina "Cris" (Isak's counterpart) is the main character of season 2.)	Nora Grace / Viri Gómez García (Note: Skam España season 3 deviated from the original Skam, creating a season with a concurrent storyline that centered around both the Noora and Vilde counterparts.)	Amira Naybet	Ended							
Netherlands	SKAM NL	NPO 3	16 September 2018	St-Gregorius College, Utrecht	Isa Keijser	Liv Reijners	Ended									
Belgium (Flanders)	wtFOCK	VIER (s. 1, 7); VIJF (s. 1–4); Play More (s. 1–3); Streamz (s. 4–5) GoPlay (s. 4–)	10 October 2018	Koninklijk Atheneum Berchem, Antwerp (s. 1–5); Kunstkaai Secondary School, Antwerp (s. 6–)	Jana Ackermans	Zoë Loockx	Robbe IJzermans	Kato Fransen (Note: Kato Fransen is an original character who does not have a counterpart in the original Skam. wtFOCK chose to deviate from the original storyline in season 4, as a result of COVID-19 related production delays.)	Yasmina Ait Omar	Ada Konings (Note: Like Druck and Skam France, wtFOCK introduced a new set of original characters in season 6. These characters attend Kunstkaai Secondary School, unlike the characters of the first five seasons. Furthermore, wtFOCK chose to introduce a new cast unrelated to the original characters in any way.)	Anaïs Davis	Otis Rojas	Ended			
Croatia	SRAM	HRT 1	27 October 2024	Prirodoslovna škola Vladimira Preloga, Zagreb	Eva Šilović	Nora Klarić Selem	Lovro Dević	Vanessa Muranović	N/A							

=== Books ===
In September 2018, Julie Andem announced on her Instagram account that, in coordination with Norwegian book publishing company Armada Forlag, four Skam books, one for each season of the series, would be released to the public, including original, unedited manuscripts, featuring scenes that were never filmed, lines that were later cut, as well as Andem's personal comments and thoughts. The first book, focusing on season one, was made available for purchase on the day of the announcement, on Monday, 3 September 2018. In the press release from Armada Forlag, Andem said that "Releasing these unedited scripts, including typos and nerd comments, is right at the edge of my comfort zone", while adding that "I hope people think it's fun to read the scripts, and that maybe someone gets inspired to write themselves". Jonas Forsang, chairman of Armada Forlag, said that "This is not just TV-history, this is major literature". Norwegian press company Aftenposten noted at the time that the timeline for the release of the three remaining books was unclear.

A few days later, Andem signed a book contract with Swedish publishing company Salomonsson Agency, which included rights for the agency to distribute the Skam books outside of Norway. CEO Julia Angelin told Verdens Gang that "We are incredibly proud to be working with the genius Julie Andem. She has changed the entire Scandinavian culture", and added that "It will be incredibly fun to build her career as an author with this unique project. We have only seen the beginning". The report from Verdens Gang also stated that the first book had been sold "at record tempo" since its release just three days earlier, and that all four Skam books will be released before the 2018 Christmas holiday period. Andem told the publication that "The Skam fans are, as I've expressed before, 'the coolest fanbase on earth'. And they are always very enthusiastic and thankful. That is nice and moving". A later update to the same article clarified that the book had "already" been distributed to Finland and Sweden, without details of further distribution. Website Books From Norway, which provides English-language information on Norwegian literature, states that rights for international book release have also been sold to Denmark through the Høst & Søn agency, Italy through the Giunti agency, Poland through the Rebis agency, and Russia through the Popcorn Books agency, though the website does not specify release dates.
