= Gullruten =

Annual Norwegian television award

Gullruten ("Golden Screen") is an annual award for the Norwegian TV industry, founded in 1998 by Norske Film- og TV-produsenters forening. The awarding committee has representatives from the major national TV companies, NRK, TV 2, TV3 and TVNorge. In 1998, the show was hosted by Nadia Hasnaoui, and from 1999 to 2012, by Dorthe Skappel. From 2013, the show has been hosted by Henriette Steenstrup and John Brungot.

The prize categories have varied over the years. Some of the categories that have been awarded are: Best Entertainment Program, Best Reality, Best Documentary Soap, Best TV Drama, Best Comedy Show, Best Children's or Youth Program, Best Magazine- or Life Style Program, Best Fact- or Actuality Program, Best TV Documentary, Best Actress, Best Actor, Best Female Television Presenter and Best Male Television Presenter.

== 2018 Awards ==
- «Best Entertainment Program»: Truls Ala Helstrøm
- Beste konkurransedrevne Reality: Alt for Norge
- «Best Reality»: Ram og Tørnquist redder Norge
- «Best Docu-Soap»: I Kongens Klær
- «Best TV Drama»: Heimebane
- «Best Comedy Program»: Stories from Norway
- «Best Children's or Youth Program»: Temadager Overgrep
- «Best Lifestyle Program»: Helsekontrollen
- «Best Actuality- or News Program»: Faten tar valget
- «Best TV Documentary»: St.Halvardshjemmet
- «Best Documentary Series»: Søsken
- «Best Actress»: Ane Dahl Torp for her role in Heimebane
- «Best Actor»: Axel Bøyum for his role in Grenseland
- «Best Female Television Presenter»: Helene Sandvig – Helene sjekker in
- «Best Male Television Presenter»: Bård Tufte Johansen – Nytt på nytt
- Årets Deltaker: Viktor Johannes Sandal – Datoen
- «Best Innovation»: Da vi styrte landet
- «Best Event- or Sportsshow»: P3 Gull
- «Honorary Prize»: Thomas Numme and Harald Rønneberg
- «TV Moment of the Year»: Tangerudbakken – Gratis Kong Håkon
- «People's Choice Award»: Nicolay Ramm

== 2017 Awards ==
- «Best Entertainment Program»: Lindmo
- Beste konkurransedrevne Reality: Farmen Kjendis
- «Best Reality»: Petter Uteligger Fra Gata Til Nordkapp
- «Best Docu-Soap»: Fjorden Cowboys
- «Best TV Drama»: Valkyrien
- «Best Comedy Program»: Vikingane
- «Best Children's or Youth Program»: Snøfall
- «Best Lifestyle Program»: Live Redder Verden Litt
- «Best Actuality- or News Program»: Åsted Norge
- «Best TV Documentary»: Dugma - The Button
- «Best Documentary Series»: Flukt
- «Best Actress»: Ellen Dorrit Petersen for her role in Aber Bergen
- «Best Actor»: Pål Sverre Hagen for his role in Valkyrien
- «Best Female Television Presenter»: Solveig Kloppen – En Kveld Hos Kloppen
- «Best Male Television Presenter»: Leo Ajkic – Flukt
- Årets Deltaker: Nina Blomli – En Dag i Livet
- «Best Innovation»: The Stream
- «Best Event- or Sportsshow»: P3 Gull
- «Honorary Prize»: Wenche Andersen
- «TV Moment of the Year»: Skam – O Helga Natt
- «People's Choice Award»: Tarjei Sandvik Moe and Henrik Holm

== 2016 Awards ==
- «Best Entertainment Program»: Skavlan
- Beste konkurransedrevne Reality: Mesternes Mester
- «Best Reality»: Dama Til
- «Best Docu-Soap»: Villmarkas Voktere
- «Best TV Drama»: Skam
- «Best Comedy Program»: Neste Sommer
- «Best Children's or Youth Program»: Labyrint
- «Best Lifestyle Program»: Med Livet Som Innsats
- «Best Actuality- or News Program»: Edderkoppen
- «Best TV Documentary»: Drone
- «Best Documentary Series»: Petter Uteligger
- «Best Actress»: Ine Wilmann for her role in Det tredje øyet
- «Best Actor»: Eivind Sander for his role in Det tredje øyet
- «Best Female Television Presenter»: Line Jansrud – Newton Fødsel
- «Best Male Television Presenter»: Kristian Ødegård – Huskestue
- Årets Deltaker: Tone "Gullet" Knudsen - Datoen
- «Best New Program Series»: Skam
- «Best Event- or Sportsshow»: Special Olympics Mats and Erling in LA
- «Honorary Prize»: Anne Grosvold
- «Best Innovation»: Skam
- «TV Moment of the Year»: Hundepatruljen – "Toffen Taes Ut Av Tjeneste"

== 2012 Awards ==
- «Best Entertainment Program»: Hver gang vi møtes
- «Best Event»: Nasjonal Minneseremoni 22.7
- «Beste Comptitive Reality»: Alt for Norge
- «Best Reality»: Ingen grenser 2
- «Best Docu-Soap»: Valdres Teens
- «Best TV Drama»: Taxi
- «Best Comedy Program»: Helt perfekt
- «Best Children's or Youth Program»: Vaffelhjarte
- «Best Lifestyle Program»: Ut i naturen: Min ungdoms vår
- «Best Actuality- or News Program»: Dokument 2
- «Best TV Documentary»: Fakta på lørdag: Sjukammersfrontsøstrene
- «Best Actress»: Ine Jansen for her role in Helt perfekt
- «Best Actor»: Anders Baasmo Christiansen for his role in Dag
- «Best Female Television Presenter»: Linda Eide – Norsk attraksjon
- «Best Male Television Presenter»: Thomas Seltzer – Trygdekontoret
- «Best Innovation»: Hurtigruten minutt for minutt
- «TV Moment of the Year»: Paradise Hotel – "Iselin Michelsens rekehistorie"
- «Honorary Prize»: Odd Karsten Tveit

== 2011 Awards ==
- «Best Entertainment Program»: Ari og Per
- «Beste Comptitive Reality»: Alt for Norge
- «Best Reality»: Trekant
- «Best Docu-Soap»: Snøballkrigen
- «Best TV Drama»: Koselig med peis
- «Best Comedy Program»: Torsdag kveld fra Nydalen
- «Best Children's or Youth Program»: Supernytt
- «Best Lifestyle Program»: Svendsen om Hansen og Jensen
- «Best Actuality- or News Program»: Brennpunkt: Med NAV i sikte
- «Best TV Documentary»: Dokument2: Knut Sigve fra Folkestad
- «Best Actress»: Tuva Novotny for her role in Dag
- «Best Actor»: Anders Baasmo Christiansen for his role in Dag
- «Best Female Television Presenter»: Haddy N'jie – TV-aksjonen 2010
- «Best Male Television Presenter»: Jon Almaas – Nytt på nytt
- «Best Innovation»: Trekant
- «TV Moment of the Year»: Fingern henges i kroker
- «Honorary Prize»: Karen-Marie Ellefsen

== 2007 Awards ==
The 10th Gullruten Award was held in 2007.

- «Best Entertainment Program»: Gylne Tider
- «Best Newcomer»: Linn Skåber for Fra hjerte til hjerte
- «Best Actress»: Ane Dahl Torp for her role in Kodenavn Hunter
- «Best Actor»: Anders Baasmo Christiansen for his role in En udødelig mann (An Immortal Man)
- «Best Female Television Presenter»: Christine Koht for Koht i familien
- «Best Male Television Presenter»: Torkjell Berulfsen for Berulfsens fargerike
- «Best Magazine- or Lifestyle Program»: Migrapolis
- «Best TV Drama»: Størst av alt
- «Best Comedy Show»: Golden Goal
- «Best TV Documentary»: Kabal i hjerter
- «Best Actuality- or Facts Program»: Truet til taushet
- «Best Reality»: Alt for Rognan
- «Best Children's or Youth Program»: Gutta Boys
- «Honorary Prize»: Kjell Kristian Rike and Jon Herwig Carlsen (sports commentators)
