= List of Skam France characters =

Skam France is a French television teen drama series broadcast by France.tv Slash and based on the Norwegian television series, Skam, created by Julie Andem. Skam France was the first international remake of the show to surpass original storylines, originally focusing on two friend groups at Lycée Dorian in Paris, but then focusing on original, younger students at the same school as the series progressed. Each season of the show centers on one character, telling a story through their perspective, touching upon themes of loneliness, friendship, feminism, sexual assault, homosexuality, religion, deafness, substance abuse, bisexuality, pregnancy denial, food insecurity, HIV, grief, depression, anger issues, and asexuality.

The series has been incredibly popular. As of March 2023, it was reported that Skam France had "accumulated more than 400 million views on Slash and YouTube." It has even reached outside of the borders of France, with publication Le Parisien touching upon the popularity of the adaptation in South Korea. The characters and storylines featured on the show have also inspired several pieces of scholarship.

Due to the diversity of its cast, characters, and storylines, the series was awarded the "Out d'or" from the AJL association of LGBTQI journalists in France in 2019. The award "celebrates the visibility of LGBTI people (lesbian, gay, bisexual, trans and intersex) in the media," and specifically focused on the inclusion of the love story between Lucas and Eliott, two teenage boys. Skam France was also later awarded the Konbini Commitment Award at the CANNESERIES festival in 2022, which specifically mentioned that the show "is genuine... [and] makes it possible for the audience to identify to its characters. Rewarding SKAM France means celebrating youth, freedom of tone and multicultural speech."

The following is a list of characters by role type who have appeared over the twelve seasons of the show.

== Central characters ==
Name	Actor	Starring seasons	Recurring/guest seasons	Original series counterpart
Emma Borgés	Philippine Stindel	1, 2, 3, 4, 5	6, 7, 8	Eva Kviig Mohn
Emma Borgés (born 2002) is the central character of season 1, which focuses on Emma's relationship with her boyfriend Yann, who used to date her best friend, Ingrid. As a result of Emma and Yann beginning to date, she has lost Ingrid and Sarah as friends. Emma struggles with loneliness and insecurities throughout her season, including the fact that she believes Yann will cheat on her with Ingrid. These insecurities come to a head when she kisses another classmate, Alexandre, at a party. As Emma grows closer to Manon, Alexia, Daphne, and Imane, she finds strength in herself and forming her own opinions. The end of her season finds Emma breaking up with Yann, and choosing to focus on herself. Later seasons characterize Emma as a free-spirited, adventurous person. Emma likes to party, and also forms an on-and-off relationship with Alexandre, who she formed a connection with in the first season. She goes on to graduate from Dorian High School in season 6, and becomes a tattoo artist.
Manon Demissy	Marilyn Lima	1, 2, 3, 4	6	Noora Amalie Sætre
Manon Demissy (born June 2, 2002) is the central character of the second season, who recently started at Dorian High School. Manon is extremely self-motivated and independent, due to her parents' work moving their family around frequently. She used to live in Madrid, but moved to Paris to live with her cousin, Lisa. The second season follows Manon as she wrestles with her attraction towards Charles Munier, a popular boy at school, which also clashes with her feminist values. Manon also struggles with the fact that her friend, Daphné, is also attracted to Charles. Other storylines deal with eating disorders, as well as Manon's sexual assault at the hands of Charles' brother, Nicolas, which throws her relationship with Charles into further disarray. The beginning of the third season sees Manon having moved to London with Charles, but she quickly returns to the flat she shares with Lisa, Mickaël, and now Lucas, when their relationship breaks down. In season 4, she attempts to move on with Sofiane, but Charles returns to reconcile. Manon then drops out of Dorian High School to do humanitarian work with Charles and her parents, but returns briefly in season six to attend Daphné's birthday party.
Lucas Lallemant	Axel Auriant	1, 3, 4, 5	2, 6	Isak Valtersen
Lucas Lallemant (born July 11, 2002) is the central character of the third season. In the beginning of the series, he is shown as Yann's best friend and a close confidant of Emma's. His mother struggles with her mental health, and his father is mostly absent from his life. These familial struggles culminate in Lucas moving in with Lisa, Mickaël, and then Manon in the third season. Lucas's season primarily functions as a coming-out story, and his romantic relationship with new classmate, Eliott. Later seasons show Lucas as a more carefree, outgoing person. He supports both Imane and Arthur as they deal with racism and hearing loss, respectively. Season six, however, highlights Lucas's struggle to trust Lola as she befriends Eliott, as he sees her as a risk to Eliott's maintaining sobriety and a good mental health.
Imane Bakhellal	Assa Sylla	1, 2, 3, 4, 5	6	Sana Bakkoush
Imane Bakhallal (born 2002) is the central character of season 4. While early seasons showed her as self-assured, her season shows her wrestle with her identity as both a regular, French teenager, and her identity as a young, Black Muslim woman in her community. This is further complicated by her growing attraction to Sofiane, her brother's best friend, who also happens to be non-religious. Imane also struggles with the racism she faces both at school from her classmates, and from strangers on the street. At the time of the season's airing, Assa Sylla was the first Black Muslim woman to lead a French television series. Seasons 5 and 6 show Imane as a supportive friend to both Arthur and Daphné, while also continuing her studies and her romantic relationship with Sofiane. She then graduates from Dorian High School at the end of the sixth season.
Arthur Broussard	Robin Migné	3, 5	4, 6, 7	Mahdi Disi
Season 5 features Arthur Broussard (born 2002) as the central character. When Arthur is introduced in season 3, he is shown more typically as comic relief, and a supportive friend to Lucas as he navigates his coming-out journey. Arthur's season is the first Skam France season to feature wholly original storylines. Arthur begins to experience gradual hearing loss, which causes him to have to navigate a whole new culture and language in French Sign Language. Other storylines of his season include him juggling romantic feelings for both Alexia, and Noée, a Deaf girl he meets through a community organization for Deaf people, navigating a tough relationship with his father, and coming to terms with the end of his high school career. Arthur graduates from Dorian High School at the end of season 6, but returns as a guest star in season 7, where it is revealed he is now in a long-term romantic relationship with Noée.
Lola Lecomte	Flavie Delangle	6, 7, 8, 9, 10	5, 11	–
Season 6 features Lola Lecomte (born November 21, 2004) as the central character. Lola is introduced as Daphné's younger sister in season 5. Lola is the first Skam France character to have a season centered on them without a counterpart in the original Norwegian series. The two girls have a combative relationship, and are not close for much of season 6. Lola struggles with alcohol and substance abuse, and these issues are intensified as she copes with the recent death of her mother, and the revelation that she and Daphné do not have the same father. Lola becomes close with Eliott, who sees Lola as a kindred spirit, and helps her navigate sobriety. Lola also becomes close with Jo, Max, Sekou, and Maya, who like to do urban exploration and call themselves "La Mif." Maya and Lola also fall in love, and with the support of Maya, Daphné, Eliott, and her new friends, Lola decides to return to inpatient treatment to deal with her mental health and her addictions. Later seasons show Lola continue to struggle with her sobriety, and her relationship with Maya unravel. Despite these setbacks, she remains a loyal friend, and goes on to graduate from Dorian High School in the tenth season. She makes a cameo appearance in season 11, waiting outside a party with Jo, Max, and Anaïs.
Tiffany "Tiff" Prigent	Lucie Fagedet	7, 8, 9, 10	6	–
Tiffany Prigent (born August 25, 2004) is the central character of the seventh season. Tiffany is the class representative of Lola's grade in season 6, who expresses her condolences when Lola's mother passes. Unfortunately, this relationship quickly sours, and Tiffany, along with Anaïs and Louise, decide to bully Lola anonymously through Instagram. Tiffany is later reprimanded for this behavior. Season 7 provides more background to Tiffany, showing that she used to be a competitive gymnast until at a gymnastics meet, she traumatically gives birth to a baby — known as pregnancy denial. This creates a radical shift in Tiff, who begins to be a more kind, empathetic person. She grows closer to La Mif, especially Jo, and forms a romantic interest in Max, who is transgender. She also decides to keep her child, who she names Moïra, and learns how to co-parent with her former fling, Aurélien. Later seasons highlight Tiff as a supportive friend, particularly to Maya and Anaïs, and a committed mother who continues to navigate her responsibilities to varied success.
Bilal Cherif	Khalil Ben Gharbia	7, 8, 9	10	–
Bilal Cherif (born January 28, 2004) is the central character of the eighth season. Bilal is a new student to Dorian High School in season 7, and a recent addition to "La Mif." He has a vested interest in fashion and luxury, and is generally characterized as easygoing. The eighth season pulls back the true curtain on his life, where it's shown that Bilal, his brother, Zakaria, and his mother have lost their house as a consequence of the COVID-19 pandemic. Temporarily, Bilal and his brother stay at Lycée Dorian, Redouane's house, and Max's apartment. By the end of the season, Bilal and his family have found stable housing, Bilal has gotten a job at a kabab restaurant, and he is happily in a relationship with Jo, who Bilal supported through her HIV-positive diagnosis. Season 9 shows Bilal getting involved in Maya's fast-fashion activism actions, and continuing his relationship with Jo. He graduates from Dorian High School at the end of season 10 with the rest of La Mif.
Maya Etienne	Ayumi Roux	6, 7, 8, 9, 10	–	–
Season 9 focuses around Maya Etienne (born October 13, 2001). Maya lost her parents at an early age from a drunk-driving incident her father caused. As a result, Maya spent much of her life within the confines of the French foster care system. She dropped out of high school, and works at a supermarket during seasons 6 and 7. She also has a vested interest in activist causes, particularly ones about protecting the environment. She is in a long-term relationship with Lola Lecomte from season 6 to season 9. When she and Lola break up at the beginning of season 9, Maya begins to experience depression and stress that she has long kept buried. She tries to throw herself into a new job as a supervisor at Dorian High School, as well as her activist actions protesting fast fashion. She also attempts to move on from Lola with June and Éléonore, but these relationships don't pan out. Maya also reconnects with her paternal grandmother, who lives in a nursing home and struggles with Alzheimer's. At the end of the season, she recommits herself to her new job, her friends, and a renewed relationship with her grandmother. Maya loses her job at Dorian High School during season 10, but is seen celebrating her friends' graduation at the school at the end of the season.
Anaïs Rocha	Zoé Garcia	7, 9, 10	6, 8, 11	–
Season 10 focuses around Anaïs Rocha (born November 15, 2004). Anaïs is introduced in season 6 as one of Tiff's best friends, along with Louise, who helps her torment Lola at school. Season 7 shows her grow apart from Tiff after Tiff gives birth to Moïra. Despite their growing distance, Tiff asks her to be Moïra's godmother, which she accepts. Anaïs is a guest character in season 8, where she helps Louise pursue Bilal romantically. Anaïs returns as a main character in season 9, where she finds a new best friend in Sasha after Louise moves away. She also begins dating Hugo, and struggles with her parents' recent divorce. In the first episode of season 10, Hugo rapes Anaïs after a party when she is drunk, and cannot consent to the act. She struggles to come to terms with what has happened to her, and with the support of Le Mif, Sasha, and her new friend, Frida, who is a feminist activist, Anaïs finds the strength to speak out about her experience, and report the rape to the police. Anaïs graduates from Dorian High School at the end of season 10, but returns to make a cameo appearance in season 11, where she is shown waiting outside a party with Lola, Max, and Jo.
Rym Brahimi	Carla Souary	11, 12	–	–
The eleventh season centers on Rym Brahimi (born March 25, 2007). Rym is a new student to Lycée Dorian, where she transfers to in the middle of the year following a court decision that took her out of her mother's home following her escalating juvenile delinquency and her anger issues. During most of the season, she lives with her foster parents, Sophie and Florian, and is ordered to do therapy sessions with Inès, a specialised educator, and her mother, Naïma. She becomes close to "The Weirdos," which consist of the headmistress's son, Yanis Toussaint, quirky Jade Miller, and non-binary teen Cléo, who quickly becomes Rym's love interest. With their help and the support of Inès and her mother, Rym is able to confront her feelings surrounding the death of her grandmother, who was Rym's primary caregiver until she died. She later moves back in with her mother at the end of the season, and reaffirms her commitment to a relationship with Cléo. Season 12 shows Rym as a calmer, happier person, still dating Cléo. She supports Maël as he comes to terms with his asexuality.
Maël Le Gall	Miguel Vander Linden	11, 12	–	–
The twelfth season centers on Maël Le Gall (born 2007). Maël is introduced in season 11 as the class representative, and a member of "The Clones," as Cléo calls them, which consists of him, his girlfriend, Léonie, and their friends, Lisa, Pablo, and Felix. He helps Rym get a job babysitting during season 11, and is also at first distrustful of her, after finding out about her checkered past. Maël is an only child, and his mother is the breadwinner of the household, as his father struggles with depression that has left him unable to hold a steady job. In season 12, after he is unable to have sex with Léonie for the first time, he finds himself growing closer to The Weirdos, including his former best friend, Cléo, and Jade. His connection with Jade quickly becomes romantic, and she helps him come to terms with his asexuality. Maël also struggles with being publicly outed at school by Léonie and Lisa, but by the end of the season, he is able to make up with Felix and Pablo. The series ends with Maël happily committed to Jade, and celebrating the impending summer break with the rest of The Weirdos.

== Main characters ==
Name	Actor	Starring seasons	Recurring/guest seasons	Original series counterpart
Daphné Lecomte	Lula Cotton-Frapier	1, 2, 3, 4, 5, 6	–	Vilde Hellerud Lien
Daphné Lecomte (born May 3, 2002) is a main character from season 1 to season 6. When the series begins, Daphné is introduced after crying in the bathroom at a party, and Emma tries to comfort her. She later joins forces with Emma, Manon, Imane, and Alexia, her childhood best friend, to throw the biggest party first years have ever thrown. She is also shown being romantically interested in Charles Munier, one of the most popular boys in school, but he coldly rebuffs her in public in front of their friends and classmates. She later has a long-term relationship with Basile Savary. Later seasons show Daphné as being interested in organizing more school events, including redecorating the school's common room, and organizing a trip to St. Tropez with the girls and Ingrid in seasons 3 and 4. Daphné is also overly concerned with self-image and status, to the point where she is embarrassed of her apartment and refuses to have her friends over, and struggles with anxiety, and an eating disorder. These are focal points of season 6, which focuses on her younger sister, Lola. Daphné graduates from Dorian High School in season 6, but is continually mentioned by her sister in later seasons, where Daphné is mentioned to have gone to college and continued her studies.
Alexia Martineau	Coline Preher	1, 2, 3, 4, 5	6	Christina "Chris" Berg
Alexia Martineau (born 2002) is a main character from seasons 1 to 5, and a recurring character in the sixth season. Alexia has been best friends with Daphné since childhood, and is generally seen as easygoing and the "comic relief" of the group of girls. She is bisexual, and has dated both guys and girls, including Romain, Clara, and Arthur Broussard. Alexia is creative, and enjoys dancing and singing, hobbies that feature in seasons 4 and 5. She is a greater presence in season 5, as she and Arthur have begun dating. She supports him through his diagnosis of gradual hearing loss, however, they break up after Arthur admits having mutual feelings for Noée. She later graduates from Dorian High School in season 6, and is later mentioned to have gone on to pursue music studies in London, United Kingdom, and is in a new relationship.
Yann Cazas	Léo Daudin	1, 3, 5	2, 4, 6, 7	Jonas Noah Vasquez
Yann Cazas (born 2002) is a main character in seasons 1, 3, and 5, and recurs in seasons 2, 4, and 6. He returns as a guest in season 7. Yann has been best friends with Lucas since they were little, and in the first season, he dates Emma. He broke up with Emma's best friend, Ingrid, for Emma, and this drove a wedge between the girls. Yann encourages Emma to make new friends, but her continuing loneliness and inability to trust him eventually lead them to break up. They remain close friends. In season 3, Yann struggles to come to terms with Lucas' sexuality, but eventually comes to accept his best friend for who he is. In season 5, he also supports Arthur as he begins to lose his hearing. He later dates Chloé Jeanson, who was interested in Lucas before he came out, but that relationship soon ends as well. He graduates from Dorian High School in season 6, but returns in season 7 as a guest at a party thrown by Le Mif.
Charles Munier	Michel Biel	2	1, 4, 6	William Magnusson
Charles Munier (born 2000) is a main character in the second season, and a recurring character in seasons one and four. He returns as a guest in the sixth season. When the show begins, Charles is introduced as a popular, older student at Lycée Dorian, who dates and then discards many girls, including Daphné Lecomte. After Manon sticks up for Daphné and calls him out for his behavior, he quickly gains interest in Manon and wants to date her, which she constantly shuts down throughout seasons 1 and 2. Charles has a younger sister, Amelié, who died, and Charles has never fully recovered from that loss. His older brother, Nicolas, also has psychological issues. Later in season 2, Manon does eventually acknowledge that she does return Charles' feelings, and they begin to date, which is then complicated by Charles' brother, Nicolas, assaulting Manon. At the end of the season, she agrees to move to London with Charles, where he plans to work with his father as a stockbroker. However, they break up in season 3, and Manon returns to Paris soon after. Charles then returns in season 4 to rekindle their relationship, and they leave together to pursue humanitarian work. Charles returns in season 6 with Manon to celebrate Daphné's birthday.
Ingrid Spielman	Zoé Marchal	4	1, 2	Ingrid Theis Gaupseth
Ingrid Spielman (born 2002) is a main character in season 4, and a recurring character in seasons 1 and 2. As the series began, Ingrid was established as a cool, popular girl at school. It was later revealed that she used to date Yann, and she and Emma were best friends, until Yann broke up with her for Emma. Emma and Ingrid eventually agree to put their differences aside at the end of season 1, and they become friendly again. Her new best friend is Sarah Blum, until her and Sarah begin to have issues between seasons 3 and 4. After Sarah ends their friendship, Ingrid is welcomed by Emma to join their friend group on a trip to St. Tropez. She also begins to date Imane's brother, Idriss. However, because of Ingrid's thoughtless, racist comments towards Imane, her religion, and her neighborhood, she causes friction between Imane and the rest of the group. When the girls pick Imane over Ingrid, the trip is cancelled. Ingrid's last appearance is in season 4, however, it can be inferred that she also graduated from Dorian High School at the end of season 6.
Mickaël "Mika" Dolleron	Edouard Eftimakis	2, 3	4, 5	Eskild Tryggvasson
Mickaël Dolleron is a main character in season 2 and 3, and a recurring character in season 4 and 5. He is Lisa's best friend and roommates with her, Manon and Lucas in seasons 2 and 3. He and Lisa continue to live together after Manon and Lucas move out. He is very invested in both Manon's relationship with Charles, and Lucas' relationship with Eliott. Mika is gay, and eventually dates Camille in season 5. He works as a barman.
Basile Savary	Paul Scarfoglio	3, 5, 6	4, 7	Magnus Fossbakken
Basile Savary (born February 16, 2002) is a main character in the third, fifth, and sixth seasons, and is a recurring character in the fourth and seventh seasons. He is introduced as a good friend of Yann and Lucas, and is often seen as the "comic relief" of the group of boys, along with Arthur, who he considers to be his best friend. He supports Arthur after he experiences gradual hearing loss, and loves all his friends very much. Basile also has a crush on Daphné Lecomte for much of the third season, which isn't reciprocated at first. After they get together, he is a devoted boyfriend, and is often worried about her mental health, which he confides to Lola about in season 6. As Lucas comes out and wonders how to handle his feelings for Eliott, who has bipolar disorder, Basile explains that his mother also has the same disease, and he had to often cook and clean for himself during her depressive episodes. This helped him discover a love for cooking. He also has a grandfather, who he calls "Papa," and goes to visit him and his grandmother on their farm several times a year. After his friends graduate in season 6, Basile has to redo his final year due to poor grades in season 7. He eventually decides to move with his mother and finish his year at his grandparents' farm. Lola mentions in season 9 that Basile went on to become a police officer, and that he and Daphné are still seeing each other.
Eliott Demaury	Maxence Danet-Fauvel	3, 6	4, 5, 9	Even Bech Næsheim
Eliott Demaury (born June 25, 2000) is a main character in the third and sixth seasons, and a recurring character in the fourth and fifth season. He returns as a guest character in the ninth season. Eliott transferred to Lycée Dorian in the third season, and quickly drew the attention of Lucas. He quickly breaks it off with his girlfriend, Lucille to pursue Lucas, and the two fall deeply in love. Though it seems to be going well at first, Eliott begins to pull away and then has a manic episode, running naked into the night. It is revealed soon after that he has bipolar disorder, and has attempted suicide three times. Lucas reaffirms his commitment to Eliott, and helps him through his subsequent depressive disorder. Season 4 reveals that Eliott was actually once close with the Bakhellal family, but his undiagnosed bipolar disorder put a wedge between them, as well as Eliott's unreciprocated feelings for Idriss, Imane's older brother. Idriss and Eliott make amends late in the season, and Eliott continues his relationship with Lucas. Eliott also likes to draw and is also interested in learning about film production, a plotline that takes center stage in season 6. He enlists Lola and her new friends to help shoot his latest film, and also befriends Lola, seeing her as a kindred spirit. This causes friction between him and Lucas, who sees Lola as a threat to Eliott's sobriety. However, by the end of season 6, they are again in a good place. He graduates, and begins college to study film. He returns in season 9 to visit Lola, and they talk about Lucas and Maya.
Sofiane Alaoui	Laïs Salameh	4	5, 6	Yousef Acar
Sofiane Alaoui (born 2000) is a main character in the fourth season, a recurring character in the fifth season, and a guest character in the sixth season. He is the best friend of Idriss Bakhellal, and he took a gap year after his graduation, spending a year in Australia before returning to France. When he returns, he reunites with Idriss and Imane, who he shows a clear romantic interest in. While Imane returns these feelings, their relationship is complicated by Sofiane no longer believing in God, which he claims was influenced by Eliott and Islam's views on homosexuality. Sofiane goes on to date Manon in season 4, but breaks up with her because he is in love with Imane, and because Charles has returned to fix things with Manon. He and Imane kiss before he leaves for Morocco on the day of Eid, and reaffirm their feelings for each other. Season 5 and 6 continues to show Sofiane in a happy relationship with Imane.
Idriss Bakhallal	Moussa Sylla	4	–	Elias Bakkoush & Mikael Øverlie Boukhal
Idriss Bakhallal (born 2000) is a main character in the fourth season. Idriss is Imane's older brother, and Sofiane's best friend. Imane and Idriss are very close, but as season 4 continues, the two begin to clash over Idriss's use of drugs and alcohol, the fact that he has struggled to find employment, and the fact that he has begun seeing Ingrid, Imane's classmate, who has been antagonizing her with racist comments. Idriss eventually tells his sister to stay out of his relationship. The two later make up when he offers Imane advice about Sofiane. Idriss also used to be best friends with Eliott, but their friendship ended abruptly after Eliott tried to kiss him, and then disappeared. Imane eventually tells her brother that Eliott has bipolar disorder, which explains his past erratic behavior, and he decides to reach back out to Eliott. Idriss is last seen at his family's Eid celebration at the end of season 4.
Noée Daucet	Winona Guyon	5	7	–
Noée Daucet is a main character in the fifth season, and a guest character in the seventh season. She is introduced as the artistic coordinator at the AJSF organization, which specializes in providing support to deaf people in Paris. Arthur begins working with the AJSF, where he grows closer to Noée. As the two fall in love, it causes friction between Arthur and Alexia. Arthur eventually ends his relationship with Noée by the end of season 5, as he wants to focus on himself and his future, but in season 7, it's shown that the two have gotten back together. Noée is also best friends with Camille, and her name in French sign language means "Storm."
Jocelyne "Jo" Benezra	Louise Malek	6, 7, 8, 9, 10	11	–
Jocelyne "Jo" Benezra (born April 1, 2003) is a main character in seasons 6, 7, 8, 9, and 10. She also makes a cameo appearance in season 11. She is the second eldest child in her family, after Lili, and older than the twins, Mona and Ethan, and toddler Solal. Jo is proudly Jewish, and is also dyslexic. When she is introduced in season 6, she is seen as more awkward, and has an unrequited crush on Eliott. She is a founding member of Le Mif, and also likes to do urban exploration with the group. Jo takes a larger role in season 7 when she transfers to Dorian High School, and becomes close with Tiff, supporting her as she decides to raise Moïra. Tiff also encourages Jo to go out with Matteo, a boy she meets outside of school. They date for much of season 7, something that also sparks jealousy in Bilal. After the two break up, Bilal begins to pursue Jo during season 8, when it is revealed that Matteo has inadvertently given Jo HIV. As the two navigate their new relationship, Bilal supports Jo as she tells her family, goes to support groups, and is then publicly outed at school. Jo's sister, Lili, takes the news the hardest, as the two used to do parkour and outdoor exercise courses together. In later seasons, Jo is a supportive friend to Lola, Maya, and Anaïs, and remains a source of comic relief for the group. She graduates from Dorian High School in season 10, and reaffirms her relationship with Bilal. Jo later makes a cameo appearance during season 11, seen waiting outside a party with Lola, Max, and Anaïs.
Max Bernini	Sohan Pague	6, 7, 8, 9, 10	11	–
Max Bernini (born January 4, 2003) is a main character in seasons 6, 7, 8, 9, and 10. He also makes a cameo appearance in season 11. Max is a founding member of Le Mif, along with Jo, Sekou, and Maya, who assists with Eliott's film production. Throughout season 6, Max is wary of Lola, as he used to date Maya before coming out as a transgender man. Maya was very supportive of his transition, and they have remained close friends ever since. This is especially evident throughout season 9, as the two live together, and Max worries over Maya's mental state after her breakup with Lola. In season 7, Max transfers to Dorian High School, and forms a romantic connection with Tiffany Prigent, although he sometimes struggles with Tiff's commitments as a mother, and her close relationship with co-parent, Aurélien. The season also finds Max applying for official gender reassignment, which is eventually approved. Max graduates at the end of season 10 from Dorian High School, and reaffirms his commitment to Tiff and their relationship.
Sekou	Quentin Nanou	6	–	–
Sekou (born 2002 – 2003) is a main character in season 6. Sekou attended the same high school as Max, Maya, and Jo, eventually founding Le Mif over their shared love of urban exploration. Sekou is shown to be very gifted with technology and computers, particularly excelling in hacking and image editing. He also has an interest in history and quantum mechanics. Sekou is revealed to have moved in the season 7 premiere to Toronto, Ontario, in Canada to enroll at a school for "gifted" kids.
Louise	Charlie Losilier	7	6, 8	–
Louise (born 2004) is a main character in the seventh season, a guest character in the sixth season, and a recurring character in the eighth season. Louise was best friends with Tiff and Anaïs in season 6, helping Tiff to cyberbully Lola, and to taunt her at school. She was later reprimanded for this behavior. In season 7, Louise takes a larger role, struggling to understand Tiff's growing distance from her and Anaïs after having Moïra. Anaïs and Louise remain close, with the former helping Louise romantically pursue Bilal during season 8. Afterward, Louise is then revealed to have moved away during the periods between seasons 8 and 9.
Redouane Bedia	Abdallah Charki	7, 8, 9, 10	–	–
Redouane Bedia (born June 11, 2004) is a main character in the seventh, eighth, ninth, and tenth seasons. Redouane is Bilal's best friend, and the other new member of Le Mif introduced in the season 7 premiere. He has one older brother, and his family is close with Bilal's, as the boys have been friends since they were little. After Bilal loses his home, he and Zak stay at Redouane's home for a while, and his mother, a lawyer, helps Bilal's mother, Adila, find a job and stable housing. Redouane enjoys film production, making short videos that he posts on his Instagram account under the "Hyper Impossible" banner. This remains a large plot point in the series, particularly in season 10, when he and Anaïs are paired together on a project. They use his family's boxing gym as a venue to film interviews with their classmates, and he reveals to her that he wants to be a director and filmmaker, a point of contention with his parents, who want him to take over the boxing gym and pick a more traditionally successful career after school. Redouane is also a source of comfort of Anaïs after her rape, and they grow close throughout season 10. He graduates Dorian High School that same season, and formally commits to studying filmmaking.
Aurélien	Daouda Keita	7	–	–
Aurélien (born 2003) is a main character in season 7. He and Tiff hooked up once, and from that encounter, she became pregnant with Moïra, their daughter. Tiff struggles early on in season 7 to tell them about their child, especially since Aurélien is a popular student who has moved on with a new girlfriend, Judith. After he finds out about Moïra, Aurélien becomes a devoted father to his child, even wanting Tiff to move in with him and his mother to raise Moïra. They eventually agree to co-parent from separate households. Aurélien was also a friend to Basile after he had to return to Dorian High School in season 7 to redo his final year.
Zakaria Cherif	Louai El Amrousy	8	7	–
Zakaria Cherif (born 2007) is Bilal's younger brother. He is a main character in the eighth season, and a guest in the seventh season. Bilal was forced to take on a caretaker role after their mother sunk into a depressive episode after losing her job as a chef due to the COVID-19 pandemic. When their mother got work in the South of France as a waitress, she left Bilal and Zak in their apartment while she left for weeks at a time. After they're kicked out of their apartment, Bilal and Zak stay at Dorian High School, the Bedia home, and Max's apartment. Zakaria is very bright and independent. He likes video games, anime, and manga, and he wants pierced ears, a request Bilal eventually fulfills during season 8 with Emma's help. When their mom finds stable housing and a new job, Zak moves into their new home.
Clément Iniesta	Léo Mazo	9, 10	–	–
Clément Iniesta (born October 2, 2004) is a main character in the ninth and tenth seasons. He is a close friend of Le Mif, as well as Hugo Regnier. After Maya and Lola break up, Maya becomes jealous of her relationship with Clément. Lola eventually explains that he is also sober, and dealt with substance abuse issues in the past, which she can relate to. He then goes on to date Sasha, Anaïs' friend, throughout the rest of the ninth and tenth seasons. Season 10 reveals that Sasha struggles with being sexually intimate with Clément, something that she is eventually able to follow through with in the season finale. Clément also struggles with the revelation that Anaïs has accused Hugo of rape, but after speaking with Sasha and witnessing Hugo's behavior, he then supports Anaïs wholeheartedly as she pursues justice. Clément graduates from Dorian High School at the end of season 10.
Sasha Pudlowski	Jade Pedri	9, 10	–	–
Sasha Pudlowski (born 2004) is a main character in the ninth and tenth seasons. She is Anaïs' new best friend, as Louise moved away between seasons 8 and 9. Sasha is bubbly, compassionate, and fiercely protective of her friends. She begins dating Clément during season 9. When Anaïs confides in her about her rape at the hands of Hugo, Sasha tells her about how her maternal grandfather also abused her mother, and how that has affected her mother to this day. She encourages Anaïs to report her rape to the police, and speak up about her experience, helping her paste words on a wall outside Lycée Dorian to warn other students about Hugo. Sasha also struggles to have sex with Clément, but follows through with this after their high school graduation in the season 10 finale. Sasha's last name, Pudlowski, is a reference to podcaster Charlotte Pudlowski, and her series, "Or maybe one night," which touches on the topic of incest and her personal experiences.
Hugo Regnier	Nathan Japy	9, 10	–	–
Hugo Regnier (born 2004) is a main character in the ninth and tenth seasons. He is introduced as a friend of Clément, and begins dating Anaïs, while Clément begins dating Anaïs' friend, Sasha. The two couples would often hang out and go on dates together. Season 10 reveals that Hugo's parents are divorced, and he is closer with his father than his mother. He is also an avid handball player. After he rapes a drunken Anaïs one night after a party, the two begin experiencing problems, to which Hugo is oblivious to the cause of their issues. When she finally is able to confront him about his actions that night, and breaks up with him, Hugo initially denies any wrongdoing, and labels her as "crazy." He then quickly starts dating another girl at their school. When Anaïs reports her rape to the police, Hugo owns up to his behavior to her, but after being interviewed by the cops, he changes his story yet again to cover up any wrongdoing. After Anaïs confronts him a final time, Hugo admits his father encouraged him to lie, as this would follow him for the rest of his life and hurt any future job prospects he might have.
Frida	Farah Kassabeh	10	–	–
Frida (born 2002) is a main character in the tenth season. Frida befriends Anaïs after meeting her at the District Training Zone boxing gym owned by Redouane's family. After Anaïs confides in her rape, Frida reveals that she was also sexually assaulted in the past, and that she has started using boxing to boost up her confidence and as a method of self-defense. Frida also introduces Anaïs to the concepts of feminism, and invites her to join a support group of women who have been through similar experiences. She later also helps Anaïs paste words on the wall outside of Lycée Dorian to warn others about Hugo's behavior towards her.
Cléo	Alma Schmitt	11, 12	–	–
Cléo (born April 1, 2007) is a main character in seasons 11 and 12, and is a member of "The Weirdos." Cléo is non-binary, and prefers he/him pronouns. His mother is very supportive. He also welcomes Rym quickly into his circle of friends, and is often patient with Rym as she starts to open up about her past and her family. Cléo reveals later in season 11 that he used to be close friends with Maël in middle school, but they drifted apart after his transition, and Maël got new friends which Cléo dubbed as "The Clones," as they often dress in the same trendy clothing, think highly of their social standing, and bully others who exist outside of their norm. He and Rym then begin a romantic relationship which continues into season 12. Season 12 shows Cléo and Maël thrown back together as they agree to perform music together at Jade's dance recital. While initially cold and wary of Maël's attempts to reach out and be friendly, Cléo warms back up to him when Maël apologizes for his behavior after Cléo came out.
Yanis Toussaint	N'Landu Lubansu	11, 12	–	–
Yanis Toussaint (born 2007) is a main character in seasons 11 and 12, and is a member of "The Weirdos." His mother is Headmaster Toussaint, the new principal of Dorian High School. While he has a loving relationship with his mother, he has a contentious relationship with his dad, who he believes has abandoned him, and they barely speak unless Yanis is pressured to by his mother. In this regard, he feels like he can relate to Rym and her feelings surrounding her own mother and grandmother in some regard, and he offers her advice on how to handle negative feelings. Yanis also enjoys video games, and begins a relationship with another teenager who plays the same game. Although Yanis believes they are a girl at first, their friend is later revealed to be a boy named Cyril, which doesn't faze him. They begin to date, and the relationship continues into season 12. Yanis then tries to give Maël relationship advice when he and Léonie begin having problems. Yanis also owns three axolotls, Janet, Todd, and Malcolm.
Jade Miller	Romane Parc	11, 12	–	–
Jade Miller (born 2007) is a main character in seasons 11 and 12, and a member of "The Weirdos." She is an only child, and her dad is of Irish descent. Her mother, Poppy, runs a dance studio, and she performs as part of the troupe of dancers. In season 11 and 12, Jade and "The Weirdos" use her grandfather's old house as a clubhouse of sorts, until her mother decides to put the house up for sale. It is hinted at during season 11 that she has a crush on Maël, a storyline that takes center stage in season 12. In season 12, Jade convinces her mother to hire Cléo and Maël to play the music for the upcoming recital, bringing the former friends closer together. It is also revealed that Jade runs an anonymous Instagram account called "Env2v_dorian" to help her classmates facilitate conversations and ask questions about sexuality, sex, and love. When Maël begins to confide to the anonymous account about how he's feeling, Jade reveals his identity, and the two grow close. They eventually begin to date, and end the series happily together, partying with their friends. Jade also has a cat named Twist.
Felix	Victor Kerven	11, 12	–	–
Felix (born 2007) is a member of "The Clones," and Maël's best friend. Popular and handsome, he gets into conflicts with Cléo and Rym, because of their differences — Cléo, for being non-binary, and Rym for having run-ins with the law. This extends into season 12, when Felix struggles to accept Maël's asexuality, though they do make up at the end of the season. He begins a relationship with Léonie in the series finale.
Lisa Meniel	Margot Heckmann	11, 12	–	–
Lisa Meniel (born 2007) is a member of "The Clones," and Léonie's best friend. She has an older sister, born in 1999. Lisa is considered to be very trendy with her outfits and clothing. When Maël breaks up with Léonie in season 12, she helps her friend break into Jade's phone, and forcibly out Maël to the whole school online. She is later reprimanded for this behavior.
Léonie	Amalia Blasco	11, 12	–	–
Léonie (born between June 21 – July 22, 2007) is a member of "The Clones." She is Maël Le Gall's girlfriend through season 11 and the beginning of season 12. Leonie is a Cancer. However, they begin to have problems and break up after Maël cannot perform during sex, leading Léonie to believe that he doesn't find her attractive. Maël allows Léonie to believe this at first, as well as the lie that he cheated on her with Jade, because he is coming to grips with his identity as an asexual person. This leads her to seek out revenge on Maël with Lisa during a school hiking trip, where the girls take Jade's phone and discover Maël is actually asexual, putting the information out on Instagram publicly. She and Lisa are later reprimanded for this behavior, and she apologizes to Maël for her behavior. She later hooks up with Felix in the series finale.
Pablo	Luc Sitbon	11, 12	–	–
Pablo (born 2007) is a member of "The Clones." He is generally a source of comic relief for his friends, however, he struggles to understand Maël's asexuality after he is forcibly outed to the whole school through Instagram. Pablo also has a younger brother, who he is close to. Pablo is also Jewish, and is shown to wear traditional Jewish jewelry.

== Recurring and guest characters ==
Name	Actor	Recurring/guest seasons	Original series counterpart
School Nurse	Olivia Côte	1, 3, 4, 5, 6, 7, 8, 9	School Nurse
The School Nurse at Dorian High School makes an appearance in seasons 1, and then 3–9. She generally has meaningful conversations with each central or main character that crosses her path, ranging from sexual health to something as simple as a broken heart. The Nurse often also brings up her boyfriend, Jerôme, in conversations.
Alexandre "Alex" Delano	Théo Christine	1, 2, 3, 4	Christoffer "Penetrator-Chris" Schistad
Alexandre "Alex" Delano (born 2001) is a recurring character in seasons 1–4. A popular student at Dorian High School, and Charles Munier's best friend, he begins an on-and-off-again romantic relationship with Emma. He graduates from Dorian High School after the fourth season.
Sarah Blum	Julie Nguyen	1, 2	Sara Nørstelien
Sarah Blum is a recurring character during season 1 and 2. Sarah is a best friend of Ingrid's, and a former best friend of Emma's. During season 2, she enters into a relationship with Lucas Lallemant, openly making out with him at school. However, when Lucas gets together with Eliott during season 3, he admits to Mika that his relationship with Sarah was largely fake. Sarah and Ingrid begin having problems, and stop being friends by season 4. Sarah never makes up with Emma or Ingrid.
Lisa	Aliénor Barré	2, 3, 4, 5	Linn Larsen Hansen
Lisa is a recurring character in seasons 2, 3, and 5, and she makes a guest appearance in season 4. She is Manon Demissy's cousin and roommate, and the best friend and roommate of Mickaël Dolleron. In season 3, Lucas is also her roommate. Lisa works as a lifeguard.
Romain	Victor Le Blond	2, 3	Kasper
Romain is a guest character in seasons 2 and 3. He begins seeing Alexia Martineau after meeting her at her grandmother's cabin, where he works. When he finds out Alexia is bisexual, he wants to have a threesome with her, but the two can not agree on the person to ask. They end their relationship between seasons 3 and 4, and Alexia begins seeing Arthur soon after.
Nicolas Munier	Roberto Calvet	2	Nikolai Magnusson
Nicolas Munier is a recurring character in season 2. He is Charles' estranged older brother, who has psychological issues. When Charles and Manon have problems in their new relationship, Nicolas convinces Manon that Charles is cheating on her during a party, and plies her with alcohol. The next morning, she wakes up naked next to him, and is unsure what happened. She eventually ends up pressing charges against him due to his continued harassment.
Marie	Sabrina Ould Hammouda	1, 2	Mari Aspeflaten
Marie is a guest character in season 1, and a recurring character in season 2. She is a good friend of the Munier family, including Nicolas and Charles. After Manon is unsure of what occurred at Nicolas' party, she meets up with Marie, who assures her nothing happened.
Headmaster Vallès	Alain Bouzigues	3, 5, 6, 7, 8, 9	–
Headmaster Vallès is a guest character in seasons 3, and 6–9. He is a recurring character in season 5. In season 3, he allows Daphné and the others to redecorate the common room, and in season 5, he asks Arthur and a few other students to give a presentation on what Dorian High School can improve upon for disabled students. In later seasons, he is often reprimanding or punishing characters for their behaviors, including Lola, Tiff, and Bilal. He takes his job seriously, but in season 9, he offers Maya a supervisory position at the school, insisting that not having a diploma wasn't a bad thing, and that having experience and a good personality was key for the job. He resigned as headmaster sometime after in 2022, during which Headmaster Toussaint took his place.
Chloé Jeanson	Anne-Sophie Soldaini	3, 4	Emma W. Larzen
Chloé Jeanson (born 2003) is a recurring character in season 3, and a guest character in season 4. She began pursuing Lucas during the third season, but left him alone after she realized he was interested in Eliott. She has a brief relationship with Yann in season 4, but that also doesn't pan out.
Lucille	Lola Felouzis	3	Sonja
Lucille is a recurring character during season 3. When she is introduced, she is Eliott's long-term girlfriend. When Eliott breaks up with her for Lucas, she believes that this is nothing more than a manic episode, and she tells Lucas as much. She later apologizes for her comments after Lucas and Eliott reconcile.
Jamila	Sandrine Salyeres	4	Jamilla Bikarim
Jamila is a recurring character in season 4. She and Imane used to be good friends when they were younger, but have drifted apart over the years. Jamila is also a practicing Muslim, and also wears a hijab. When she and Imane reconnect, she offers advice about Sofiane, and the two also talk about their religion, and double standards for women and men.
Camille	Lucas Wild	5	–
Camille is a recurring character in season 5. Camille is an AJSF volunteer, and Noée's best friend. He becomes close with Arthur Broussard as well, and eventually begins dating Mika.
Carole Broussard	Anne Bouvier	5	–
Carole Broussard is a recurring character during season 5. She is Arthur's mother. After getting pregnant with Arthur in medical school, she dropped out to take care of him. She works as a secretary, and is kind and loving with her son. She tolerates Patrick's bad temper, but is devastated when she learns that Patrick hit Arthur hard enough to cause his gradual hearing loss.
Patrick Broussard	François Feroleto	5	–
Patrick Broussard is a recurring character during season 5. He is Arthur's father. He met Carole in medical school, and when she got pregnant, he continued with his studies, and became a surgeon. He often has a bad temper, and hit Arthur hard enough in the head to cause his gradual hearing loss. Patrick pushes Arthur to get a cochlear implant, even when his son is unsure of the procedure. When Arthur eventually confronts him about his past behavior, Patrick is remorseful.
Papy Savary	François Clavier	5	–
Papy Savary makes a guest appearance in season 5, when Basile takes his friends to visit his grandparents' farm. The two have a very close relationship. During season 7, Basile makes the decision to move out to his grandparents' farm and complete his studies there.
Thierry Lecomte	Régis Romele	6, 9	–
Thierry Lecomte is a recurring character in season 6, and a guest character in season 9. He is the biological father of Daphné Lecomte, and the legal father of Lola Lecomte. He has a combative relationship with Lola through most of season 6, mostly because Thierry and his wife sent Lola to a psychiatric facility after learning of her self-harming behaviors in 2016. He is devastated after losing his wife Julie to depression and alcoholism. As their family deals with their grief, Thierry grows closer to his daughters, and supports Lola as she reenters treatment. Thierry appears in a photo with Maya and Lola during season 9, and also reaches out via text to check on Maya and inquire about Lola's sobriety.
Judith	Lisa Do Couto Teixeira	7	–
Judith is a recurring character during season 7. She is Aurélien's new girlfriend, and a friend of Basile's, who also attends Dorian High School. She and Aurélien later break up due to her jealousy surrounding Tiff and Moïra.
Céline Prigent	Vahina Giocante	7	–
Céline Prigent is a recurring character during season 7, and she is Tiffany's mother. She and Constantin got together when they were young, and as a result, Céline has lived the life she wanted to have through her daughter, who is a successful gymnast. She is concerned with status and image, and is, at first, ashamed of her daughter's pregnancy. However, Céline later supports her daughter, and helps her raise Moïra at home. She grows more present and less strict in her daughter and granddaughter's lives. It is mentioned later that she and Constantin split up, and he moves out of their house.
Constantin Prigent	Alexis Loret	7	–
Constantin Prigent is a recurring character in the seventh season, and he is Tiffany's father. He and Céline are at odds when it comes to Tiff having custody of Moïra, as he would like to know his granddaughter. He is more helpful with Moïra when Tiff first brings her home, comforting and feeding the baby. It is mentioned later that he and Céline split up, and he moves out of their house. However, he maintains a large presence in his daughter and granddaughter's lives.
Adila Cherif	Alika Del Sol	8	–
Adila Cherif is a recurring character during season 8. She is Bilal and Zakaria's mother. Adila falls into a deep depression after losing her husband, and then her job in the aftermath of the COVID-19 pandemic, which forces her older son to take on a caretaker role. At the beginning of season 8, Adila is in the South of France, working as a waitress for low pay, but soon quits to return to Paris and be with her sons. Redouane's mother eventually helps her find stable housing and a new job, but her and her family first stay with the Bedias, and then in Max's apartment for a period of time.
Mathéo	Vincent Rialet	8	–
Mathéo is a recurring character during season 8, and is first mentioned in season 7, as a boy that Jo is seeing. During season 8, it is revealed that Mathéo gave Jo HIV through an unprotected sexual encounter. Because of their diagnoses, Mathéo and Jo keep in touch, and support each other, which is something that initially sparks jealousy in Bilal during the beginning of their relationship.
Sandra Benezra	Laurence Oltuski	8	–
Sandra Benezra is a recurring character during season 8. She is Jo's mother. Because of her job, she often enlists her two eldest daughters to help with childcare. Upon learning of her daughter's diagnosis, she and her husband attempt to be more level-headed about it. Sandra is Jewish.
Alain Benezra	Jean Patrick Delgado	8	–
Alain Benezra is a recurring character during season 8. He is Jo's father. Because of his job, he often enlists his two eldest daughters to help with childcare. Upon learning of his daughter's diagnosis, he and his wife attempt to be more level-headed about it. Alain is Jewish.
Lili Benezra	Elia-Carmine Robbe	8	–
Lili Benezra is Jo's older sister, and a recurring character during season 8. She is less supportive of Jo after finding out about her HIV diagnosis. It is mentioned that they used to do outdoor boot camps together before Jo was diagnosed. She often babysits her younger siblings. Lili is Jewish.
June	Angèle Mac	9	–
June (born between April 20 – May 20, 1999) is a recurring character in season 9. She is a part of the environmental activist group Planet A. She is friends with Maya, and they date for a brief period of time after she and Lola break up. June's former relationship with an activist did not work out, as they were always talking about activism-related things.
Suzanne Etienne	Monique Cardo Flores	9	–
Suzanne Etienne is Maya's paternal grandmother, and a recurring character in season 9. Suzanne has Alzheimer's, and often forgets that her son and his wife are dead, even going so far as to call Maya "Emiko," her mother's name. Maya stopped visiting, as reliving the death of her parents was very traumatic. After breaking up with Lola, Maya makes more of an effort to visit her grandmother and share her life with her.
Yann	Mayeul Durand	9	–
Yann is a recurring character during season 9. He works at the care facility where Suzanne Etienne lives, and mentions having worked taking care of her for about three years.
Ely	Léo Landon Barret	9	–
Ely is June's friend, and a recurring character during season 9. She is part of several activist associations, including one that organizes trips across Europe. Ely offers Maya a chance to go on one of these trips, but she eventually declines the offer to stay in Paris.
Éléonore	Loryn Nounay	9	–
Éléonore is a guest character during season 9, going on one date with Maya after she breaks up with Lola. She has a dog named Rocket, who she loves very much.
Valérie Rocha	Karen Dersé	10	–
Valérie Rocha is Anaïs' mother, and a recurring character during season 10. She is divorced from Vincent, and is now the primary caretaker of her daughter. She supports Anaïs after she is raped, and encourages her daughter to go to the police.
Vincent Rocha	Aliocha Itovitch	10	–
Vincent Rocha is Anaïs' father, and a recurring character during season 10. After he and Valérie divorce, he mainly sees Anaïs for dinners, on vacations, and on holidays. He is a businessman, and is very angry when her daughter reveals she's been raped. He supports her and encourages her to make a police report.
Police investigator	Alice Suquet	10	–
A recurring character during season 10, who takes the lead on the investigation into Anaïs' rape.
Gynecologist	Jade Herbulot	10	-
A guest character during season 10, who takes a rape kit from Anaïs when she reports the rape to the police.
Psychologist	Eléanore Gurrey	10	–
A guest character during season 10, who psychologically evaluates Anaïs after she reports her rape.
Police	Aurélien Boyer	10	–
A guest character during season 10, who helps investigate Anaïs' sexual assault.
Sophie	Elsa Pasquier	11	–
Sophie is Rym's foster mother, who is a recurring character in season 11. She is a writer, and she and Florian have one adult son. Rym destroys Sophie's computer after Sophie uses Rym's life as inspiration for her writings, and Rym moves out to move back in with her mother.
Florian	David Saada	11	–
Florian is Rym's foster father, who is a recurring character in season 11. He has an easier relationship with Rym than Sophie does. He and Sophie have one adult son. At the end of the season, Rym moves out of his home to move back in with her mother.
Headmistress Toussaint	Magaly Birdy	11, 12	–
Headmistress Toussaint is the new headmistress of Dorian High School, and Yanis Toussaint's mother. She recurs in both seasons 11 and 12. She is separated from her husband, and is considered to be tough, but fair. She allows Rym to stay at Dorian High School after Rym accidentally hurts a teacher during a fight with Felix and Maël, and reprimands Léonie and Lisa after forcibly outing Maël to his classmates.
Emilien (supervisor)	Martin Darondeau	11, 12	–
Emilien is a recurring character during seasons 11 and 12. He works at Dorian High School as a supervisor, working closely with Headmistress Toussaint. He is occasionally clueless about happenings around him.
Mr. Michelet	Soufiane Guerraoui	11	–
Mr. Michelet is a teacher at Dorian High School who recurs during the eleventh season. After he is injured during a fight between Rym, Felix, and Maël, he is vocal in wanting her expelled. When Rym is allowed to stay, he resigns from his position in anger.
Naïma Brahimi	Sofia Elabassi	11	–
Naïma Brahimi is a recurring character during season 11. She is Rym's biological mother. Naïma and Rym have a tough relationship, particularly because Naïma left Rym with her mother, who raised Rym until her recent death. When Rym begins to act out and becomes physically violent, Naïma asks the court to intervene, removing Rym from her custody. Naïma and Rym are required to do mandatory therapy sessions, and over the course of the season, Naïma and her daughter rebuild their relationship. She supports Rym in staying at Lycée Dorian, and eventually advocates for her daughter to return to her custody, which is granted.
Inès (specialised educator)	Léo Chalié	11	–
Inès is a recurring character during season 11. She is the therapist who helps Naïma and Rym rebuild their relationship, and also helps Rym to vocalize her feelings and understand her anger.
Zélie	Leina Djema	11	–
Zèlie is a recurring character in the eleventh season. She is Rym's former best friend, who stops talking to her after Rym's violent outburst, which she was witness to.
Nicolas	Odaha Sama	11	–
Nicolas is a guest character in season 11, who hires Rym to look after his son, Alexandre.
Cyril	Romain Baele	11, 12	–
Cyril is Yanis' boyfriend, who originally met him through a video game they both liked to play. Though Yanis originally thought Cyril was a girl, he is unfazed by his true identity. He is a recurring character in seasons 11 and 12.
Alexandre	Benjamin Lu	11	–
Alexandre is a recurring character in season 11. He is the child Rym is hired to look after, as she wants to make extra money.
Clara	Calista Jubely	11	–
Clara is a guest character during season 11. She is a classmate of The Weirdos and The Clones at Dorian High School.
Luana	Eglantine Razzouki	11	–
Luana is a guest character during season 11. She is a classmate of The Weirdos and The Clones at Dorian High School.
Judge	Thierry Desroses	11	–
A guest character during season 11, who presides over Rym's case in the French court system.
Idriss	Jean-Désiré Augnet	12	–
Idriss is a recurring character in season 12. He is part of the troupe of dancers at Poppy Miller's studio, and a former romantic interest of Jade Miller. Maël is jealous of Idriss at first, as he had his own romantic feelings for Jade. The two become friends as season 12 goes on.
Aude Le Gall	Karina Marimon	12	–
Aude Le Gall is a recurring character in the twelfth season. She is Maël's mother. Aude works in the medical field, and is the primary breadwinner of her household after her husband falls into severe depression, which leaves him unable to work. She is hurt and confused when her son steals her prescription pad to get Viagra, and also when her husband lies about reaching out to his former employer to see about a job opportunity. She believes Maël should get a more traditional job in medicine, rather than pursue music. After her son comes out as asexual, she struggles with this information, but comes around after seeing how happy he is performing at Jade's dance recital.
Eric Le Gall	Olivier Bas	12	–
Eric Le Gall is a recurring character during season 12. He is Maël's father. Eric struggles with depression, and is unable to hold a steady job. He lies to his wife about reaching out to his former employer about a job, which saddens her. He encourages his wife to accept their son's asexuality when he comes out to them.
Poppy Miller	Sabine Crossen	12	–
Poppy Miller is Jade's mother, and a recurring character in the twelfth season. She owns and runs a dance studio, and hires Cléo and Maël to perform the music for her annual recital. She later lets her daughter know that they will be putting her grandfather's house on the market.
Assa	Amina Conteh	12	–
Assa is a recurring character during season 12, and a classmate at Dorian High School. After Maël is outed as asexual, she confides in Maël that she is also asexual, and that he is not alone. She later brings him to a support group for asexual people.
Aline	Aline Laurent Mayard	12	-
Aline is a guest character during season 12, and is part of the asexual support group Maël attends.
Julie	Ariéle Bonte	12	–
Julie is a guest character during season 12, and is part of the asexual support group Maël attends.
Tom	Kim Tassel	12	–
Tom is a guest character during season 12, and is part of the asexual support group Maël attends.
Mrs. Ernandez	Véronique Caquineau	12	–
Mrs. Ernandez is a guest character in season 12. She is a Spanish teacher at Dorian High School.
Sport teacher	Jérémie Laure	12	–
A guest character during season 12, he supervises the hiking trip that The Weirdos and The Clones take, during which Maël is forcibly outed by his classmates.
