= Skam France =

French-Belgian teen drama television series

- Also known as: SKAM Belgique
- Genre: Teen drama
- Created by: Julie Andem
- Directed by: David Hourregue (season 1–6); Shirley Montserrat (season 7–10); Manon Gaurin (season 11–12)
- Starring: Philippine Stindel; Marilyn Lima; Axel Auriant; Assa Sylla; Robin Migné; Flavie Delangle; Lucie Fagedet; Khalil Ben Gharbia; Ayumi Roux; Zoé Garcia; Carla Souary; Miguel Vander Linden; Lula Cotton Frapier; Coline Preher; Maxence Danet-Fauvel; Théo Christine; Paul Scarfoglio
- Composers: Owlle (season 7–10); Pablo Arcansas (season 11–12)
- Countries of origin: France; Belgium (Wallonia)
- Original language: French
- No. of seasons: 12
- No. of episodes: 122 (+1 special)

Production
- Producers: Alban Etienne (season 1–8); Carole Della Valle (season 3–12)
- Production location: Paris
- Cinematography: Xavier Dolléans; Cyril Bron
- Running time: 16–33 minutes
- Production companies: Gétévé Productions; AT-Production; France Télévisions; RTBF

Original release
- Network: France.tv Slash; France 4; La Trois
- Release: 9 February 2018 – 14 July 2023

Skam France (titled Skam Belgique in Belgium; often stylized as SKAM) is a French-Walloon teen drama television series broadcast by France.tv Slash that follows the lives of teenagers in Paris. It is a French adaptation of the popular Norwegian series SKAM.

== Concept ==
SKAM France is based on the Norwegian series SKAM, created by Julie Andem, which follows the daily life of high school students and the problems that they face. The plot of each season focuses around a different central character and particular themes. Each adaptation of the original series follows a similar storyline. The series is aired via short clips published on the Internet in real-time which are compiled to form a longer episode at the end of each week. Characters also have in-universe Instagram accounts where text conversations are published.

== Premise ==
=== First Generation ===
Seasons 1–5 focused on the "first generation" of students at Lycée Dorian or Dorian High School in Paris, composed of characters based on the original Norwegian series. The first season introduces Emma Borgés, who starts her first year of high school after losing her friends Ingrid and Sarah the year before. With her new friends Manon, Daphné, Imane and Alexia, known as "The Crew," she attempts to organize the biggest party ever thrown by first years. However, she also struggles to trust her boyfriend, Yann, who used to date Ingrid, and tries to rediscover herself and redefine her relationship and friendships.

Season 2 focused on Emma's new best friend, Manon Demissy, who is considered to be more mature than the others in their friend group, however, the stormy relationship she has with Charles, the most popular guy at school puts Manon at odds with her feminist values, and her newfound friendship with the girls, most specifically Daphné, who harbors a crush on Charles.

The third season shifted focus to Yann's friend group, "The Gang." The season centers on his best friend, Lucas Lallemant, who struggles with coming out to Yann, Arthur and Basile after falling in love with the new student, Eliott. Other plots included Eliott's struggles with bipolar disorder, and Lucas helping Daphné and the girls renovate the school's common room.

Season 4 then shifted back to Emma and Manon's friend group, focusing on their friend, Imane Bakhellal, a Black Muslim teenager searching for her own autonomy and her identity while living up to the expectations of her family, friends, and what she believes to be a "good Muslim." This is complicated when she begins to fall for her brother's best friend, Sofiane, who is non-Muslim.

Season 5 was the first season to continue past the original Skam storylines, centering again on Yann and Lucas' friend group and the character of Arthur Broussard, who gradually begins losing his hearing, and must begin to figure out how to navigate the worlds of both hearing and non-hearing people. He also struggles to define his romantic relationships with Alexia and Noée, a girl he meets through an association that assists Deaf people in Paris. He also questions his future with the end of high school for him and his friends fast approaching.

=== Second Generation ===
Season 6–10 focused on a new class of students at Dorian High School, but did occasionally feature appearances from the cast of earlier seasons, most prominently in season six, which focused on Daphné's younger sister, Lola Lecomte. Daphné and her sister aren't close, particularly since Lola struggles with alcohol and substance abuse. After Lola returns home from another stint in rehab, the siblings must contend with the death of their mother, Lola's revelation that she and Daphné do not share the same father, and Daphné's eating disorder. With support from The Gang, The Crew, and Lola's new friends, "La Mif," which consists of Jo, Max, Sekou, and her love interest, Maya, the two sisters work to come back together again.

Season 7 focuses on Tiffany Prigent, a popular girl returning to school after a traumatic pregnancy denial, where she ended up giving birth at a gymnastics meet. Tiffany, having bullied Lola in the previous season, finds herself becoming closer to Lola and her friends, becoming close to Jo and forming a newfound romantic interest in Max. These new friendships threaten her other ones with Anaïs and Louise, other popular girls who used to consider themselves "The Trio." Tiffany also has to learn how to co-parent with her former fling, Aurélien.

Season 8 centers around Bilal Cherif, a new member of La Mif after Sekou moved away between seasons 6 and 7. He struggles with homelessness and food insecurity after his mother loses her job as a result of the COVID-19 pandemic. Bilal also has to contend with his romantic interest in Jo, and her HIV positive diagnosis throughout the season, requiring both of them to learn how to ask for support from their friend group.

The ninth season returns to storylines that originated in the sixth season. Maya Etienne is the central character, and her season deals with the fallout of her breakup with Lola, which brings up feelings of depression and heartbreak she hadn't fully dealt with since the death of her parents years ago. As a result, Maya reaches out to the grandmother she barely knows, and attempts to again bury her feelings through her activism work.

The tenth season revolves around Anaïs Rocha, Tiffany's former best friend. After she is raped by her boyfriend, she finds herself reaching out to La Mif, specifically Lola, Maya, Tiffany, Jo, and Redouane, as well as new friends Sasha and Frida, for support in confronting what has happened to her and how to move past it. Along the way, Anaïs discovers feminist causes, and how that can help her in her goals.

=== Third Generation ===
Seasons 11–12 again shifted focus to a new, younger class of students at Dorian High School. Characters from the previous generation make cameo appearances in season 11, which focuses on the character of Rym Brahimi, a girl who transfers late in the year following a court decision which places her in the French foster system. While attempting to contend with her anger issues, delinquency, the death of her grandmother, and her own distant mother, Rym forms new friendships with "The Weirdos." The Weirdos consist of the headmistress's son, Yanis Toussaint, quirky Jade Miller, and non-binary teen Cléo, who quickly becomes Rym's love interest.

Season 12 shifts to another friend group dubbed "The Clones" by Cléo, as they often dress in the same trendy clothing, think highly of their social standing, and bully others who exist outside of their norm. Maël Le Gall, a member of their group, struggles to live up to his friends' expectations when he and his girlfriend, Léonie, attempt to have sex for the first time. When Maël struggles to perform, he is quickly ostracized by his friends, and finds solace with "The Weirdos." He reforms his friendship with Cléo, and also finds himself drawn to Jade, who helps him accept that he identifies with asexuality.

== Cast and characters ==
The following are characters in Skam France, and their counterparts from the original Norwegian series:

=== Central characters ===
Actor	Character	Counterpart	First Generation					Second Generation					Third Generation	
Actor	Character	Counterpart	1	2	3	4	5	6	7	8	9	10	11	12
Philippine Stindel	Emma Borgès	Eva Kviig Mohn	Central	Main	Main	Main	Main	Recurring	Guest	Guest				
Marilyn Lima	Manon Demissy	Noora Amalie Sætre	Main	Central	Main	Main		Guest						
Axel Auriant	Lucas Lallemant	Isak Valtersen	Main	Recurring	Central	Main	Main	Recurring						
Assa Sylla	Imane Bakhellal	Sana Bakkoush	Main	Main	Main	Central	Main	Recurring						
Robin Migné	Arthur Broussard	Mahdi Disi			Main	Recurring	Central	Recurring	Guest					
Flavie Delangle	Lola Lecomte						Guest	Central	Main	Main	Main	Main	Guest	
Lucie Fagedet	Tiffany Prigent							Recurring	Central	Main	Main	Main		
Khalil Ben Gharbia	Bilal Cherif								Main	Central	Main	Guest		
Ayumi Roux	Maya Etienne							Main	Main	Main	Central	Main		
Zoé Garcia	Anaïs Rocha							Guest	Main	Recurring	Main	Central	Guest	
Carla Souary	Rym Brahimi												Central	Main
Miguel Vander Linden	Maël Le Gall												Main	Central

=== Main characters ===
Actor	Character	Counterpart	First Generation					Second Generation					Third Generation	
Actor	Character	Counterpart	1	2	3	4	5	6	7	8	9	10	11	12
Lula Cotton-Frapier	Daphné Lecomte	Vilde Hellerud Lien	Main	Main	Main	Main	Main	Main						
Coline Preher	Alexia Martineau	Christina "Chris" Berg	Main	Main	Main	Main	Main	Recurring						
Léo Daudin	Yann Cazas	Jonas Noah Vasquez	Main	Recurring	Main	Recurring	Main	Recurring	Guest					
Michel Biel	Charles Munier	William Magnusson	Recurring	Main		Recurring		Guest						
Zoé Marchal	Ingrid Spielman	Ingrid Theis Gaupseth	Recurring	Guest		Main								
Edouard Eftimakis	Mickaël Dolleron	Eskild Tryggvasson		Main	Main	Recurring	Recurring							
Paul Scarfoglio	Basile Savary	Magnus Fossbakken			Main	Recurring	Main	Main	Recurring					
Maxence Danet-Fauvel	Eliott Demaury	Even Bech Næsheim			Main	Recurring	Recurring	Main			Guest			
Laïs Salameh	Sofiane Alaoui	Yousef Acar				Main	Recurring	Guest						
Moussa Sylla	Idriss Bakhellal	Elias Bakkoush				Main								
Moussa Sylla	Idriss Bakhellal	Mikael Øverlie Boukhal				Main								
Winona Guyon	Noée Daucet						Main		Guest					
Louise Malek	Jo Benezra							Main	Main	Main	Main	Main	Guest	
Sohan Pague	Max Bernini							Main	Main	Main	Main	Main	Guest	
Quentin Nanou	Sekou							Main						
Charlie Loisilier	Louise							Guest	Main	Recurring				
Abdallah Charki	Redouane Bedia								Main	Main	Main	Main		
Daouda Keita	Aurélien								Main					
Louai El Amrousy	Zakaria Cherif									Main				
Léo Mazo	Clément Iniesta										Main	Main		
Jade Pedri	Sasha Pudlowski										Main	Main		
Nathan Japy	Hugo Regnier										Main	Main		
Farah Kassabeh	Frida											Main		
Alma Schmitt	Cléo												Main	Main
N’Landu Lubansu	Yanis Toussaint												Main	Main
Romane Parc	Jade Miller												Main	Main
Victor Kerven	Félix												Main	Main
Margot Heckmann	Lisa Meniel												Main	Main
Amalia Blasco	Léonie												Main	Main
Luc Sitbon	Pablo												Main	Main

=== Recurring and guest characters ===
Actor	Character	Counterpart	First Generation					Second Generation					Third Generation	
Actor	Character	Counterpart	1	2	3	4	5	6	7	8	9	10	11	12
Olivia Côte	School Nurse	School Nurse	Guest		Guest	Guest	Guest	Guest	Guest	Guest	Guest			
Théo Christine	Alexandre "Alex" Delano	Christoffer "Penetrator-Chris" Schistad	Recurring	Recurring	Recurring	Recurring								
Julie Nguyen	Sarah Blum	Sara Nørstelien	Recurring	Recurring										
Aliénor Barré	Lisa	Linn Larsen Hansen		Recurring	Recurring	Guest	Recurring							
Victor Le Blond	Romain	Kasper		Guest	Guest									
Roberto Calvet	Nicolas Munier	Nikolai Magnusson		Recurring										
Sabrina Ould Hammouda	Marie	Mari Aspeflaten	Guest	Recurring										
Alain Bouzigues	Headmaster Vallès				Guest		Recurring	Guest	Guest	Guest	Guest			
Anne Sophie Soldaini	Chloé Jeanson	Emma W. Larzen			Recurring	Guest								
Lola Felouzis	Lucille	Sonja			Recurring									
Sandrine Salyeres	Jamila	Jamilla Bikarim				Recurring								
Lucas Wild	Camille						Recurring							
Anne Bouvier	Carole Broussard						Recurring							
François Feroleto	Patrick Broussard						Recurring							
François Clavier	Papy Savary						Guest							
Régis Romele	Thierry Lecomte							Recurring			Guest			
Lisa Do Couto Teixeira	Judith								Recurring					
Vahina Giocante	Céline Prigent								Recurring					
Alexis Loret	Constantin Prigent								Recurring					
Alika Del Sol	Adila Cherif									Recurring				
Vincent Rialet	Mathéo									Recurring				
Laurence Oltuski	Sandra Benezra									Recurring				
Jean Patrick Delgado	Alain Benezra									Recurring				
Elia-Carmine Robbe	Lili Benezra									Recurring				
Angèle Mac	June										Recurring			
Monique Cardo Flores	Suzanne Etienne										Recurring			
Mayeul Durand	Yann										Recurring			
Léo Landon Barret	Ely										Recurring			
Loryn Nounay	Éléonore										Guest			
Karen Dersé	Valérie Rocha											Recurring		
Aliocha Itovitch	Vincent Rocha											Recurring		
Alice Suquet	Police investigator											Recurring		
Jade Herbulot	Gynecologist											Guest		
Eléanore Gurrey	Psychologist											Guest		
Aurélien Boyer	Police											Guest		
Elsa Pasquier	Sophie												Recurring	
David Saada	Florian												Recurring	
Magaly Birdy	Headmistress Toussaint												Recurring	Recurring
Martin Darondeau	Emilien (supervisor)												Recurring	Recurring
Soufiane Guerraoui	Mr. Michelet												Recurring	
Sofia Elabassi	Naïma Brahimi												Recurring	
Léo Chalié	Inès (specialised educator)												Recurring	
Leina Djema	Zélie												Recurring	
Odaha Sama	Nicolas												Guest	
Romain Baele	Cyril												Recurring	Recurring
Benjamin Lu	Alexandre												Recurring	
Calista Jubely	Clara												Guest	
Eglantine Razzouki	Luana												Guest	
Thierry Desroses	Judge												Guest	
Jean-Désiré Augnet	Idriss													Recurring
Karina Marimon	Aude Le Gall													Recurring
Olivier Bas	Eric Le Gall													Recurring
Sabine Crossen	Poppy Miller													Recurring
Amina Conteh	Assa													Recurring
Aline Laurent Mayard	Aline													Guest
Ariéle Bonte	Julie													Guest
Kim Tassel	Tom													Guest
Véronique Caquineau	Mrs. Ernandez													Guest
Jérémie Laure	Sport teacher													Guest

== Episodes ==
=== Series overview ===
Season	Episodes	Originally released		
Season	Episodes	First released	Last released	Network
1	9	February 9, 2018	April 6, 2018	France.tv Slash; France 4 La Trois
2	13	April 13, 2018	June 22, 2018	France.tv Slash; France 4 La Trois
3	10	January 25, 2019	March 29, 2019	France.tv Slash; France 4 La Trois
4	10	April 5, 2019	June 4, 2019	France.tv Slash; France 4 La Trois
5	10	January 10, 2020	March 6, 2020	France.tv Slash; France 4 La Trois
6	10	April 24, 2020	June 26, 2020	France.tv Slash; France 4 La Trois
7	10	January 22, 2021	March 19, 2021	France.tv Slash; France 4 La Trois
8	10	May 7, 2021	July 9, 2021	France.tv Slash; France 4 La Trois
9	10	January 14, 2022	March 18, 2022	France.tv Slash; France 4 La Trois
10	10	May 13, 2022	July 2, 2022	France.tv Slash; France 4 La Trois
11	10	March 10, 2023	May 5, 2023	France.tv Slash; France 4 La Trois
12	10	May 12, 2023	July 7, 2023	France.tv Slash; France 4 La Trois
Special		July 14, 2023		France.tv Slash; France 4 La Trois

=== Season 1 (2018) ===
Season 1 aired from 9 February to 6 April 2018 and comprised 9 episodes. Emma Borgès is the central character and the season focuses on her relationship with her boyfriend Yann, as well as themes of cyberbullying and friendship.

No. overall	No. in season	Title	Duration	Original release date
1	1	"Seule au monde (Alone in the world)"	22 min	February 9, 2018
2	2	"Ajouter un ami (Add a friend)"	21 min	February 16, 2018
3	3	"Un plan béton (A solid plan)"	20 min	February 23, 2018
4	4	"Passage à l'acte (From word to deed)"	18 min	March 2, 2018
5	5	"Question de confiance (Matter of trust)"	20 min	March 9, 2018
6	6	"Conséquences (Consequences)"	24 min	March 16, 2018
7	7	"Quel genre de fille es-tu? (What kind of girl are you?)"	21 min	March 23, 2018
8	8	"Girl Power"	20 min	March 30, 2018
9	9	"Tous ensemble (All together)"	20 min	April 6, 2018

=== Season 2 (2018) ===
Season 2 aired from 13 April to 22 June 2018 and comprised 13 episodes. Manon Demissy is the central character and the season focuses on her relationship with Charles, a popular boy at school, and themes of sexual abuse.

No. overall	No. in season	Title	Duration	Original release date
10	1	"Laisse Daphné tranquille (Leave Daphné alone)"	20 min	April 13, 2018
11	2	"Et laisse moi aussi (And leave me alone too)"	20 min	April 20, 2018
12	3	"Se repprocher (Moving closer)"	22 min	April 27, 2018
13	4	"Une nuit d'enfer (A hell of a night)"	18 min	April 29, 2018
14	5	"Tu pense qu'à toi (You only think about yourself)"	19 min	May 4, 2018
15	6	"Élément perturbateur (Disruptive element)"	20 min	May 11, 2018
16	7	"Tu jures que tu ne bouge pas (You swear you won't move)"	20 min	May 18, 2018
17	8	"T'es juste trop naïve (You're just too naïve)"	21 min	May 25, 2018
18	9	"Les jours d'après (The days after)"	21 min	June 1, 2018
19	10	"Jamais sortir du lit (Never get out of bed)"	18 min	June 3, 2018
20	11	"Menacée (Threatened)"	18 min	June 8, 2018
21	12	"Psychotage (Psychopath)"	19 min	June 15, 2018
22	13	"À jamais jeunes (Forever young)"	20 min	June 22, 2018

=== Season 3 (2019) ===
Season 3 aired from 25 January to 29 March 2019 and comprised 10 episodes. Lucas Lallemant is the central character, and the season deals with his homosexuality, coming out, and his relationship with Eliott, who is later revealed to be suffering from bipolar disorder, another major theme of the season.

No. overall	No. in season	Title	Duration	Original release date
23	1	"Je crois que je suis amoureux... (I think I'm in love...)"	24 min	January 25, 2019
24	2	"La curiosité (Curiosity)"	24 min	February 1, 2019
25	3	"Infiltration"	22 min	February 8, 2019
26	4	"Le garçon qui avait peur du noir (The boy who was afraid of the dark)"	22 min	February 15, 2019
27	5	"Au même moment à l'autre bout de l'univers (At the same time, in another universe)"	24 min	February 22, 2019
28	6	"Insomnie (Insomnia)"	19 min	March 1, 2019
29	7	"Assumer (Assume)"	24 min	March 8, 2019
30	8	"Coup de tête (Impulse)"	24 min	March 15, 2019
31	9	"Les gens sont comme ils sont (People are as they are)"	25 min	March 22, 2019
32	10	"Minute par minute (Minute by minute)"	28 min	March 29, 2019

=== Season 4 (2019) ===
Season 4 aired from 5 April to 4 June 2019 and comprised 10 episodes. It centers around Imane Bakhellal and themes of faith and racism. It was reported that Assa Sylla, who played Imane, was the first black Muslim woman to lead a French television series.

No. overall	No. in season	Title	Duration	Original release date
33	1	"Je te fais confiance (I trust you)"	24 min	April 5, 2019
34	2	"Juste toi et moi (Just you and me)"	20 min	April 12, 2019
35	3	"(presque) parfait ((almost) perfect)"	25 min	April 19, 2019
36	4	"Un peu seule parfois (A little lonely sometimes)"	21 min	April 26, 2019
37	5	"Friendzone"	26 min	May 3, 2019
38	6	"La nature humaine (Human nature)"	21 min	May 10, 2019
39	7	"Mauvaise stratégie (Bad strategy)"	21 min	May 17, 2019
40	8	"Seule (Alone)"	23 min	May 24, 2019
41	9	"Mes looseuses préférées (My favorite losers)"	27 min	May 31, 2019
42	10	"Le jour de l'Aïde (The day of Eid)"	25 min	June 4, 2019

=== Season 5 (2020) ===
Season 5 aired from 10 January to 6 March 2020 and comprised 10 episodes. Arthur Broussard is the main character and the series deals with themes of deafness, invisible disability and ableism.

No. overall	No. in season	Title	Duration	Original release date
43	1	"Le début de la fin (The beginning of the end)"	19 min	January 10, 2020
44	2	"En silence (In silence)"	28 min	January 17, 2020
45	3	"Tête de con (Doucheface)"	22 min	January 24, 2020
46	4	"Rien ne change (Nothing changes)"	20 min	January 31, 2020
47	5	"Le temps de s'habituer (Time to get used)"	27 min	February 7, 2020
48	6	"Entre potes (Between friends)"	27 min	February 14, 2020
49	7	"La sourd-Valentin (Deaf Valentine)"	22 min	February 15, 2020
50	8	"Faire un choix (Make a choice)"	26 min	February 21, 2020
51	9	"Rapports de force (Balance of power)"	27 min	February 28, 2020
52	10	"Plus jemais pareil (Never the same again)"	27 min	March 6, 2020

=== Season 6 (2020) ===
Season 6 aired from 24 April to 26 June 2020 and comprised 10 episodes. It centers around Lola Lecomte, Daphné's younger sister, and her struggles with addiction and self-destructive behavior. This season is the first of the second generation, as the focus shifts on younger students at Dorian High School.

No. overall	No. in season	Title	Duration	Original release date
53	1	"Presque parfaite (Almost perfect)"	22 min	April 24, 2020
54	2	"La mif (The fam)"	22 min	May 1, 2020
55	3	"L'une pour l'autre (There for each other)"	24 min	May 8, 2020
56	4	"La descente (The descent)"	24 min	May 15, 2020
57	5	"Un, deux, trois (One, two, three)"	23 min	May 22, 2020
58	6	"Un grand vide (A great void)"	20 min	May 29, 2020
59	7	"Mise au point (Focus)"	16 min	June 5, 2020
60	8	"Virage (Turns)"	23 min	June 12, 2020
61	9	"La rechute (The relapse)"	19 min	June 19, 2020
62	10	"L'ombre et la lumière (Shadow and light)"	27 min	June 26, 2020

=== Season 7 (2021) ===
Season 7 began on 22 January 2021 and ended on 19 March 2021. Tiffany Prigent is the central character and the season deals with issues of teen pregnancy, as well as pregnancy denial.

No. overall	No. in season	Title	Duration	Original release date
63	1	"Une autre vie (Another life)"	23 min	January 22, 2021
64	2	"Comme avant (Like before)"	22 min	January 29, 2021
65	3	"Au pied du mur (At the foot of the wall)"	30 min	February 5, 2021
66	4	"Page blanche (Blank page)"	27 min	February 12, 2021
67	5	"La famille (Family)"	27 min	February 19, 2021
68	6	"Un lien fort (A strong bond)"	29 min	February 26, 2021
69	7	"La peur au ventre (Fear in the stomach)"	19 min	February 28, 2021
70	8	"Choisir sa vie (Choose your life)"	22 min	March 5, 2021
71	9	"Princesse en détresse (Princess in distress)"	17 min	March 12, 2021
72	10	"Le village (The village)"	25 min	March 19, 2021

=== Season 8 (2021) ===
Season 8 began on 7 May 2021 and ended on 9 July 2021. The central character is Bilal Cherif, who struggles with issues of homelessness and food insecurity, while juggling a relationship with Jo Benezra, who has just been diagnosed with HIV.

No. overall	No. in season	Title	Duration	Original release date
73	1	"Sur le fil (On the wire)"	22 min	May 7, 2021
74	2	"Rien d'exceptionnel (Nothing exceptional)"	23 min	May 14, 2021
75	3	"Les apparences (Appearances)"	21 min	May 21, 2021
76	4	"Comme chez vous (Like home)"	21 min	May 28, 2021
77	5	"Jemais sans la MIF (Never without la MIF)"	21 min	June 4, 2021
78	6	"Lâcher prise (Let go)"	21 min	June 11, 2021
79	7	"Sous la carapace (Under the carapace)"	18 min	June 18, 2021
80	8	"Sans Issue (Hopeless)"	25 min	June 25, 2021
81	9	"Le bruit qui court (The rumors)"	18 min	July 2, 2021
82	10	"Horizons"	22 min	July 9, 2021

=== Season 9 (2022) ===
Season 9 aired from 14 January 2022 to 18 March 2022, centering around Maya Etienne. Maya and her long-time girlfriend, Lola, break up, causing Maya to reevaluate her life and confront feelings she has buried since the death of her parents when she was young.

No. overall	No. in season	Title	Duration	Original release date
83	1	"Tout va bien (Everything's fine)"	23 min	January 14, 2022
84	2	"Des raisons (Reasons)"	27 min	January 21, 2022
85	3	"Fissure (Crack)"	21 min	January 28, 2022
86	4	"Un pas en avant (One step forward)"	33 min	February 4, 2022
87	5	"La lune est magnifique (The moon is beautiful)"	29 min	February 11, 2022
88	6	"Lola"	25 min	February 18, 2022
89	7	"Dégage (Get out)"	21 min	February 25, 2022
90	8	"L'échappée belle (The great escape)"	21 min	March 4, 2022
91	9	"Le monde s'écroule (The world is falling apart)"	22 min	March 11, 2022
92	10	"Je vous aime (I love you guys)"	22 min	March 18, 2022

=== Season 10 (2022) ===
On 19 March 2022, it was confirmed that season 10 will be centered around Anaïs Rocha and the themes of rape and feminism. The season began airing on 13 May 2022 and finished airing on 2 July 2022.

No. overall	No. in season	Title	Duration	Original release date
93	1	"Le retour (The return)"	30 min	May 13, 2022
94	2	"Piégee (Trapped)"	25 min	May 20, 2022
95	3	"Ma faute (My fault)"	18 min	May 27, 2022
96	4	"Punching-ball (Punching bag)"	23 min	June 3, 2022
97	5	"Deuxième round (Second round)"	22 min	June 10, 2022
98	6	"Nos douleurs (Our pains)"	22 min	June 12, 2022
99	7	"Révélation (Revelation)"	21 min	June 17, 2022
100	8	"Warrior"	26 min	June 24, 2022
101	9	"Épreuve finale (Final match)"	22 min	July 1, 2022
102	10	"Promo 2022 (Class of 2022)"	16 min	July 2, 2022

=== Season 11 (2023) ===
It was confirmed on 23 February 2023 that Skam France would be returning for an eleventh season, again shifting focus to other students at Dorian High School. The central character is Rym Brahimi, a new student who transfers in the middle of the year, and the topics of her season focus on the French foster system, deliquency, and what it means to belong. The season began airing on 10 March 2023, completing its run on 5 May 2023.

No. overall	No. in season	Title	Duration	Original release date
103	1	"Faux départ (False start)"	18 min	March 10, 2023
104	2	"Pas si seule (Not so alone)"	21 min	March 17, 2023
105	3	"Bad trip"	22 min	March 24, 2023
106	4	"Tout brûler (Burn everything)"	15 min	March 25, 2023
107	5	"Mauvaise (Bad)"	24 min	March 31, 2023
108	6	"Plus la même (Not the same anymore)"	21 min	April 7, 2023
109	7	"Sur le fil (On the wire)"	22 min	April 14, 2023
110	8	"La meilleure solution (The best solution)"	26 min	April 21, 2023
111	9	"A bout de souffle (Breathless)"	17 min	April 28, 2023
112	10	"Préparer la suite (Preparing the future)"	22 min	May 5, 2023

=== Season 12 (2023) ===
It was confirmed on 23 February 2023 that Skam France would be returning for a twelfth season, alongside the eleventh season's announcement. The central character will be Maël Le Gall, another student at Dorian High School, and the topics of his season will focus on asexuality and teenage first love, confirmed by France.tvslash on 5 May 2023. The first clip of his season subsequently released on 7 May 2023. It was confirmed in an interview with cast and crew that season 12 would be the last broadcast by France Télévisions and its affiliates. The series finale aired on 7 July 2023.

No. overall	No. in season	Title	Duration	Original release date
113	1	"Le première fois (The first time)"	20 min	May 12, 2023
114	2	"Jamais simple (Never simple)"	21 min	May 19, 2023
115	3	"Garder la face (Save face)"	19 min	May 26, 2023
116	4	"La bonne personne (The right person)"	21 min	June 2, 2023
117	5	"Envie d'avoir envie (Wanting to want to)"	24 min	June 9, 2023
118	6	"Perte d'orientation (Loss of orientation)"	18 min	June 12, 2023
119	7	"Qui tu es (Who are you)"	21 min	June 16, 2023
120	8	"La vie rêvée (The dream life)"	20 min	June 23, 2023
121	9	"Épanoui (Blooming)"	22 min	June 30, 2023
122	10	"Staycations"	27 min	July 7, 2023

=== Special ===
A week after the final episode of Skam France aired, France.tvslash released a retrospective looking back on the making and production of seasons 11 and 12. This also showcased cast and crew speaking about how the show has touched them and the audiences the show had reached worldwide.

No. overall	No. in season	Title	Duration	Original release date
123	1	"Saison 11 & 12 - Le Making-of (The Making of Season 11 & 12)"	13 min	July 14, 2023
