= False pregnancy =

Signs and symptoms of pregnancy without the presence of a fetus

- Other names: Phantom pregnancy, hysterical pregnancy, pseudocyesis, delusional pregnancy
- Specialty: Psychiatry

False pregnancy (or pseudocyesis, from Ancient Greek pseudes 'false' and kyesis 'pregnancy') is the appearance of clinical or subclinical signs and symptoms associated with pregnancy although the individual is not physically carrying a fetus. The mistaken impression that one is pregnant includes signs and symptoms such as tender breasts with secretions, abdominal growth, delayed menstrual periods, and subjective feelings of a moving fetus. Examination, ultrasound, and pregnancy tests can be used to rule out false pregnancy.

False pregnancy has a prominent psychiatric component as well as physical manifestations of pregnancy. It can be caused by trauma (either physical or mental), a chemical imbalance of hormones, and some medical conditions. Contributing psychological factors include a strong desire for pregnancy or misinterpretation of objective bodily sensations. Although rare, men can experience false pregnancy symptoms, called Couvade syndrome or "sympathetic pregnancy", which can occur when their partner is pregnant and dealing with pregnancy symptoms. Psychotherapy, pharmacotherapy with antidepressants or antipsychotics, hormonal therapy, and uterine curettage are sometimes needed as treatment.

While extremely rare in the United States because of the frequent use of medical imaging, in developing regions such as India and sub-Saharan Africa, the incidence of false pregnancy is higher. Rural areas see more instances of false pregnancy because such women are less often examined by a health care professional or midwife during the duration of believed pregnancy.

== Classification ==
In the Diagnostic and Statistical Manual of Mental Disorders (DSM-5), false pregnancy is a somatic symptom disorder; it is listed as "not elsewhere classified", meaning it is in a category by itself, different from other somatic symptom disorders such as functional neurological symptom disorder (formerly known as conversion disorders). The word pseudocyesis comes from the Greek words pseudes which means "false" and kyesis which means "pregnancy".

False pregnancy is sometimes referred to as "delusional pregnancy", but the distinction between the two conditions is inexact. Delusional pregnancy is typically used when there are no physical signs of pregnancy, but false pregnancy can also be delusional. Some authors consider the two conditions able to be used interchangeably for research purposes.

== Signs and symptoms ==
The symptoms of pseudocyesis are similar to the symptoms of a true pregnancy. Signs of false pregnancy include amenorrhea (missed periods), galactorrhea (flow of milk from breast), breast enlargement, weight gain, abdominal growth, sensations of fetal movement and contractions, nausea and vomiting, changes in the uterus and cervix, and frequent urination.

Abdominal distention is the most common symptom. In pseudocyetic abdominal swellings, the abdomen becomes uniformly swollen, and the navel stays inverted. The wall of the abdomen adopts a muscular, tympanic character.

Duration of symptoms typically ranges from several weeks to nine months.

== Causes and mechanism ==
The exact mechanisms behind false pregnancy are not completely understood, but psychological and endocrine components may play a substantial role. Women who experience false pregnancy often experience related feelings of stress, fear, anticipation, and general emotional disturbance. These strong emotions, along with dysfunctional changes in hormonal regulation, can significantly increase prolactin levels. Prolactinemia (high prolactin levels) can lead to many of the symptoms of true pregnancy, such as amenorrhea, galactorrhea, and tender breasts. Heightened activity of the central nervous system may contribute to the abdominal distension, sensations of fetal movement, and assumed contraction pains experienced by many women with false pregnancy.

Endocrine changes observed in pseudocyesis include a decrease in dopamine levels, increase in nervous system activity, or dysfunction in the central nervous system. These changes may be responsible for amenorrhea, galactorrhea, and hyperprolactinemia seen in falsely pregnant women. Elevated sympathetic activity has been linked to the increase in abdominal size as well as the apparent feel of fetal movement and contractions.

How abdominal distension develops is not fully understood and several causes have been proposed. A buildup in fat around the abdominal cavity, heavy constipation, habitual lordosis, and other causes may produce the appearance of a distended abdomen, and the resulting swelling can remain for months. After women with false pregnancy are placed under anesthesia, or are successfully persuaded that they are not pregnant, the distention promptly disappears, indicating that the proposed mechanisms are supplementary factors behind, but not the ultimate causes of, abdominal swelling. Manipulation of abdominal wall muscles, such as the diaphragm, is the most likely contributor to abdominal distention. For example, continuously contracting the diaphragm may give the appearance of a distended abdomen while forcing the intestinal units downwards. The sensations of fetal movement may also be related to contractions of the abdominal wall due to peristalsis, or movements of the gastrointestinal tract.

About one in six false pregnancies is potentially influenced by concomitant medical or surgical conditions including gallstones, abdominal tumors, hyperprolactinaemia, constipation, tubal cysts, and esophageal achalasia.

Psychiatric disorders, such as anxiety or mood disorders, personality disorders, and schizophrenia are common among women with false pregnancy, and may be linked to its development. Some women with depression may gain weight due to decreased physical activity and poor eating habits. Antipsychotics can induce pregnancy-like symptoms such as amenorrhea, galactorrhea, breast tenderness, and weight gain via raising prolactin levels.

=== Risk factors ===
Psychological factors are associated with false pregnancy, including a strong desire for pregnancy; a misunderstanding of sensory changes in the body (for example, bloating or increased pressure on the pelvis); and depressive disorders that can lead to changes in the neuroendocrine system. Other social factors impacting include low educational status, marital issues, unstable relationship patterns, history of partner abuse, social deprivation, poverty, lower socioeconomic status, and unemployment. Other factors such as mental and physical trauma—like experiencing a miscarriage, infertility, loss of child, or sexual abuse—can manifest false pregnancy. Symptoms may arise in women who are experiencing grief after loss in their reproductive abilities, rejecting the idea of motherhood and pregnancy, or facing challenges in gender identity. Other psychological factors include recurrent miscarriages, stress of imminent menopause, tubal ligation (sterilization surgery), and hysterectomy.

== Diagnosis ==
Evaluation required to confirm false pregnancies includes a pelvic exam, a blood or urine pregnancy test, and an ultrasound. A pelvic exam can show if conception has occurred, blood and urine can be tested for hormones released in pregnancy, and ultrasound shows the absence of the fetus. An ultrasound can accurately distinguish between a false and true pregnancy. There is no universal laboratory profile for women with false pregnancy; measured concentrations for prolactin, progesterone, follicle stimulating hormone, estrogen, and luteinizing hormone vary widely.

In some cases, false pregnancy symptoms may mask underlying medical conditions such as abdominal tumors, central nervous tumors, ovarian cysts, or gallstones. Medical tests and imaging are recommended to rule out potentially life-threatening conditions.

=== Differential ===
Delusional pregnancy is distinct from false pregnancy; although the distinction is "blurred", physical signs of pregnancy are not present in delusional pregnancy, while false pregnancy includes symptoms of true pregnancy. According to Gogia et al. (2020), false pregnancy "involves a false belief that one is pregnant, but differs from delusional pregnancy in that it is a psychosomatic rather than psychotic or purely delusional belief". In delusional pregnancy, schizophrenia accounts for more than a third of cases.

The symptoms of false pregnancy can be misinterpreted by the individual as a true pregnancy when the symptoms are actually caused by diseases (like hormone-secreting tumors, alcoholic liver disease, cholecystitis, urinary tract infection, gallstones) or exposure to a substance (like a medication), or other conditions like constipation.

== Management ==
Additional interventions such as psychotherapy and pharmacotherapy are sometimes needed. Psychotherapy may be used when individuals have difficulty coming to terms with their false pregnancy, or remain symptomatic after knowing their false diagnosis. It allows patients to confront reality and accept the symptoms as illusions and provides an opportunity resolve other psychological stressors and trauma that may be implicated in manifestations of false pregnancy.

There is no direct evidence for treating false pregnancy with pharmacotherapy, but medications may be used to restore hormonal and neurotransmitter imbalances which are implicated in physical manifestations of false pregnancy. Reduction in catecholamine levels have been observed in people with symptoms such as hyperprolactinemia and abdominal distentions. For most people, psychotherapy, pharmacotherapy (with antidepressants or antipsychotics), hormonal therapy, and uterine tissue removal is adequate to treat the condition.

Antipsychotics have been shown to increase lactation and amenorrhea, and can trigger delusions. The delusion may be resolved with medication changes or adjustments. When underlying medical conditions or surgical conditions including gallstones, abdominal tumors, hyperprolactinemia, and constipation are identified, treatment may reduce the severity of the delusion.

== Epidemiology ==
The rate of pseudocyesis in the United States has declined significantly since 1940. The rate in 1940 of one occurrence for approximately every 250 pregnancies had dropped by 2007 to between one and six occurrences for every 22,000 births. In Nigeria, the frequency of false pregnancies was 1 in 344 true pregnancies, and in Sudan false pregnancies were reported to be 1 in 160. There were about 550 cases documented in the literature as of 2016, with most cases in those between the ages of 20 and 44.

Women of reproductive age comprise the majority of pseudocyesis occurrences. About 80% of women who experience pseudocyesis are married. False pregnancies are more common in societies with certain cultures and religions, particularly in areas where there is a high degree of pressure for women to have multiple children, and for those children to be male.

Although rare, pseudocyesis occurs more commonly in developing countries. It is reported more frequently in countries that place heavy emphasis on fertility and childbearing; such pronatalist beliefs are often highly prominent in developing countries. In sub-Saharan Africa, a woman is allowed to share her husband's property only if she bears children. In these countries (and other developing nations), infertile women often experience abuse, blame, and discrimination. Societal factors enforce the importance of female fertility in these countries, thus possibly contributing to pseudocyesis rates.

In addition to men, mothers of pregnant women may experience Couvade syndrome, and a woman can experience multiple episodes of pseudocyesis in her lifetime.

== History ==
The perception of false pregnancy has evolved over time. In the late 17th century, French obstetrician François Mauriceau believed that the enlarged abdomens of falsely pregnant patients were caused by bad air. Physicians slowly began to acknowledge other potential causes of pseudocyesis, including its origin in the mind and in the body. In 1877, a physician named Joshua Whittington Underhill observed that physical symptoms can convince a woman of pregnancy, or a "disordered brain" can convince her that ordinary abdominal pains or bowel movements are instead fetal movements. The idea that pseudocyesis could result from a woman's perception of herself led to investigation into the role of emotions in cases of pseudocyesis. An investigator in the early 20th century observed that strong emotions can dry a woman's milk supply. The investigator went on to infer that the opposite was also true, and it was believed that strong emotions could bring about its production in women who are not pregnant. Alternatively, some physicians questioned the legitimacy of pseudocyesis as a condition. For instance, French obstetrician Charles Pajot stated in the 19th century, "there are no false pregnancies, only false diagnoses."

== Society and culture ==
In the mid-1960s, a woman who appeared to be in labor was not properly examined because delivery appeared imminent; it was thought that her water broke but the expelled liquid was urine. In 2008, a woman in the United States who was suspected of being in labor was given a C-section but there was no fetus.

Gynecologist John Dewhurst studied the sequence of the supposed miscarriages of Anne Boleyn, second wife of King Henry VIII of England, which followed the birth of her first child, Elizabeth, in September 1533 and the series of reported miscarriages that followed. Excluding the miscarriage of a male child of almost four months' gestation in January 1536, he postulated that, instead of a series of miscarriages, Anne was experiencing pseudocyesis (false pregnancies), a condition "occur[ing] in women desperate to prove their fertility.". Henry's eldest daughter Queen Mary I had a false pregnancy. After coming to terms with it, she reportedly believed that God had not made her pregnant because she had not sufficiently punished heretics.

Anna O (Josef Breuer's patient as mentioned in 1895 by Breuer and Sigmund Freud in Studies on Hysteria), experienced false pregnancy in the context of preexisting mental health problems. After being diagnosed with hysteria, she believed she was pregnant by Breuer, her therapist. She even believed she was in labor as she was trying to have another session with Breuer. More recent publications suggest she had central neurological signs with a chronic cough that improved during high altitude stays. Those characteristics, as well as the ineffectiveness of psychoanalytic cures, seem to indicate a more organic diagnosis such as tuberculous meningitis or tuberculous encephalitis with partial temporal epileptic component.

== See also ==
- Denial of pregnancy
- Cryptic pregnancy
- Murder of Bobbie Jo Stinnett
