= Xavier Dolléans =

French cinematographer

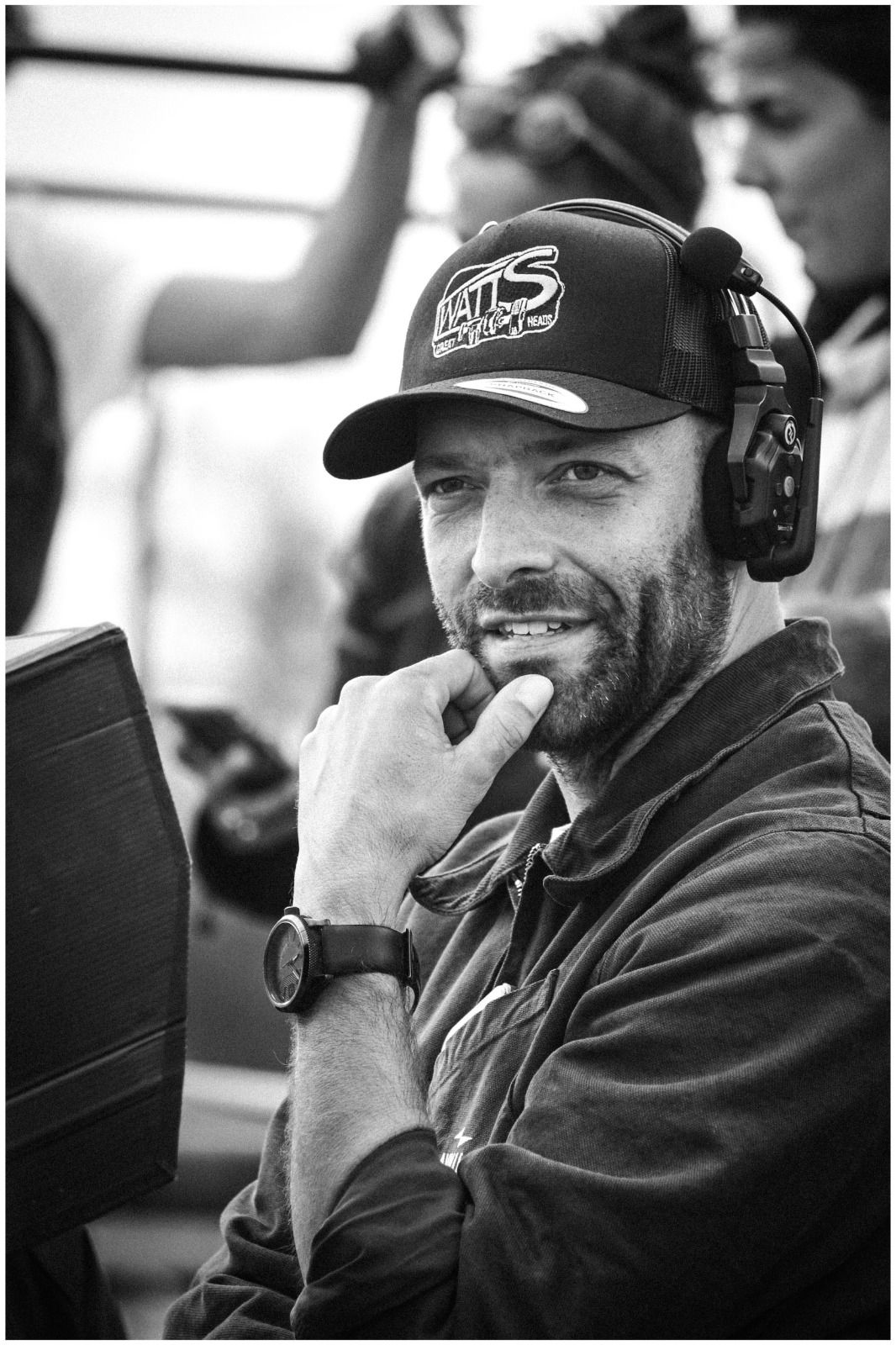
- Born: France
- Occupation: Cinematographer

Xavier Dolléans is a French cinematographer. He is known for his work on the television series Skam France, Germinal, and Mrs. Davis, and the feature film Marinette.

== Career ==
Xavier began his career working as a camera assistant and lighting technician on feature films and television series. He later worked as director of photography on multiple seasons of the series Skam France. He became an active member of the Association Française des Directeurs de la Photographie Cinématographique (AFC) in 2021.

== Selected filmography ==
=== Television ===
- 2026: High Value Target: The Hunt for Saddam
- 2025: Escort Boys
- 2025: Joseph
- 2023: Mrs. Davis
- 2021: Germinal
- 2018-2020: Skam France

=== Film ===
- 2023: Marinette

== Awards and nominations ==
| Year | Result | Award | Category | Work | Ref. |
|---|---|---|---|---|---|
| 2026 | Nominated | French Society of Cinematographers Awards | Best Cinematography For A Series | Escort Boys | |
| 2021 | Nominated | Camerimage | TV Series Competition | Germinal | |
| 2021 | Won | Series Mania | Audience award | Germinal | |
