= Axel Auriant =

French actor and drummer (born 1998)

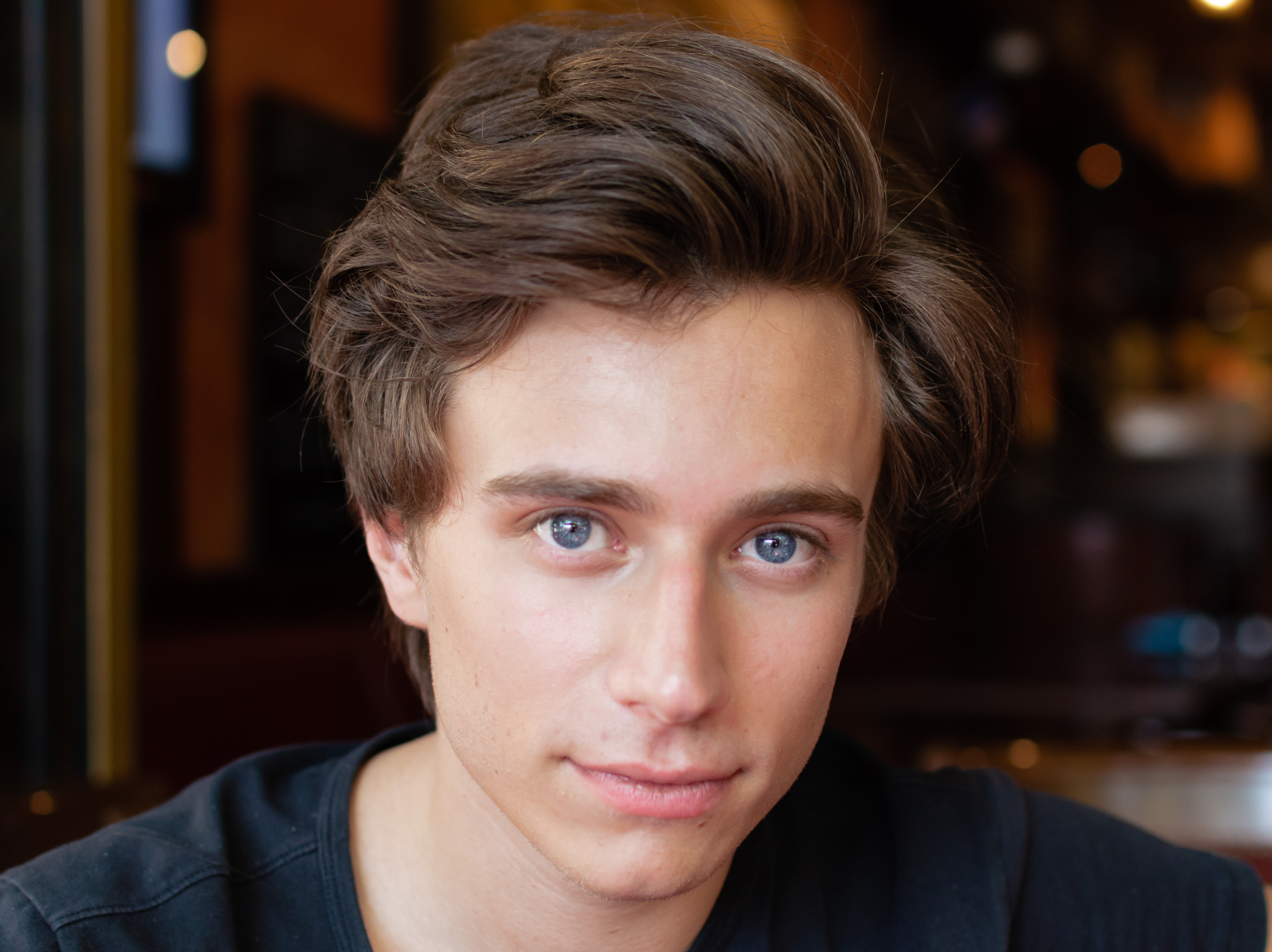
- Auriant at the Paris Pride March in 2019
- Born: 1 January 1998 (age 28); Besançon, Doubs, France
- Occupations: Actor; drummer

Axel Auriant (French: [aksɛl ɔʁjɑ̃]; born 1 January 1998) is a French actor and drummer. He is known for his role as Lucas Lallement in the French-Belgian TV drama series Skam France.

== Early life ==
Auriant was born on 1 January 1998 in Besançon. He studied at the École Alsacienne in Paris.

He started working in theatre drama in 2010, as part of the acting company Les Sales Gosses ('The Bad Boys') – a professional children's acting company. There, he met and worked with Olivier Solivérés, an author and director who, a few years later, gave him a role in his work Au pays du Père Noël ('In the Land of Father Christmas') in the Théâtre des Mathurins. He played this role for two years.

== Career ==
He decided to become a professional actor when he was about 16 years old, as a result of learning about Molière in literature classes at school. In 2016, he joined the Municipal Conservatoire Jaccques Ibert (affiliated with the Paris Conservatory) in the 19th arrondissement of Paris. (Note: This is one of the Conservatoires à rayonnement régional (CRR), see fr:Conservatoire de musique, danse et art dramatique en France.)

At the age of 19, Axel Auriant made his mark in theatre in the one-man show Une vie sur mesure ('A Unique Life') (Note: A story about an autistic teenager - the title literally means "A tailor-made life") by Cédric Chapuis. He played this role for more than a year at the Théâtre Tristan-Bernard. The show won the Etoile du Parisien award (Note: l'Etoile du Parisien is a recognition awarded by the French newspaper, Le Parisien) for best play of 2017.

He played Lucas in the French adaptation of the Norwegian teen drama Skam. His character was the protagonist of the third series, which was released in 2019. Upon this series' release, Skam France became the most watched online drama in France. It propelled Axel Auriant, as well as his on-screen counterpart Maxence Danet-Fauvel, to an international level.

In the same year, he began playing in Les 1001 vies des Urgences (The 1001 Emergency Lives) at the Théâtre des Béliers parisiens, a new one-man show adapted from the novel Alors voilà. Les 1001 vies des Urgences by Baptiste Beaulieu and produced by Arthur Jugnot. He played an abridged version of it at the thirtieth night of the Molières 2020 at the Théâtre du Châtelet, Paris. By the age of 21, Axel Auriant had made more than 500 appearances on stage.

In 2020, he appeared in Charlène Favier's Slalom, which was officially selected for the 2020 Cannes Film Festival, the 2020 Angoulême Francophone Film Festival and the Ornano-Valenti Prize at the 46th Deauville American Film Festival. Also in 2020, he took part in an advertising campaign for Cartier directed by Cédric Klapisch.

As well as being a professional actor, Axel Auriant is also a professional drummer. He began drumming in 2003.

== Filmography ==
=== Cinema ===
- 2015: Nos futurs ('Our Futures') directed by Rémi Bezançon: Léo
- 2016: Jamais contente ('Never Happy') directed by Émilie Deleuze: Tom
- 2020: Slalom directed by Charlène Favier: Maximillien
- 2021: Les Mains vides ('The Living Hands') (Where Is Madame Catherine?) directed by Arthur Dupont: Jacques

=== Television ===
- 2014: Nos chers voisins ('Our Dear Neighbours') directed by Roger Delattre: Jérémy
- 2014: Fais pas ci, fais pas ça ('Don't Do This, Don't Do That') directed by Laurent Tuel
- 2018: Meurtres à Lille ('Murders in Lille') directed by Laurence Katrian: Oscar d'Armentières
- 2018-2020: Skam France directed by David Hourrège: Lucas Lallemant
- 2019: Nina (TV series) directed by Eric Le Roux
- 2021: Plan B (2021 TV series) directed by Christophe Campos: Felix

=== Dubbing work ===
(The year given is when the dubbed work was released, not necessarily the same as the original)

- 2017: The Crossing directed by Florence Miailhe: Erdewan
- 2019: Dumbo directed by Tim Burton: extra voice
- 2019: Spider-Man: Far From Home directed by Jon Watts: Zach
- 2021: JoJo's Bizarre Adventure: BabyHead (TV animé series)

== Theatre ==
- 2008: Salles Gosses Show ('Bad Boys Show') by Sylvie Ferrié and Philippe Bretin at Le Divan du Monde and Théâtre de Ménilmontant
- 2015-2016: Au pays du Père Noël ('In the Land of Santa Claus') stage production by the author Olivier Solivérès, played at the Théâtre des Mathurins
- 2016: Les Petits Moyens ('The Little Ways') by Eugène Labiche, stage production by Loïc Berger
- 2017-2019: Une vie sur mesure by Cédric Chapuis, stage production by Stéphane Batle, played at the Théâtre Tristan-Bernard
- 2019-2020: Les 1001 Vies des Urgences by Baptiste Beaulieu, stage production by Arthur Jugnot, played at the théâtre des Béliers parisiens and the Théâtre du Splendid
- 2021: Times Square by Clément Koch, stage production by José Paul, played at the Théâtre de la Michodière (filmed for the France 2 TV channel)
- 2021: Saint-Exupéry ou le mystère de l’aviateur by Flavie Péan and stage production by the author, Arthur Jugnot, played at the Théâtre des Béliers (Avignon), and the Théâtre du Splendid

== Awards ==
- 2018: Étoile du Parisien - Play of the Year for Une vie sur mesure by Cédric Chapuis
