= The Last Mercenary (2021 film) =

- Theatrical release poster
- Directed by: David Charhon
- Screenplay by: David Charhon; Ismael Sy Savane
- Produced by: Jean-Charles Levy; Nicolas Manuel; Olivier Albou; Laurence Schonberg; David Charhon; Jakéma Charhon; Eponine Maillet; Olias Barco; Vlad Riashyn; Anna Vlasova; Karyna Bershadskaya
- Starring: Jean-Claude Van Damme; Alban Ivanov; Assa Sylla; Samir Decazza
- Distributed by: Netflix
- Release date: 30 July 2021
- Running time: 110 minutes
- Country: France
- Language: French

The Last Mercenary is a 2021 French action comedy film directed by David Charhon with a screenplay by Charhon and Ismael Sy Savane. The film stars Jean-Claude Van Damme in the lead role, along with a supporting cast that includes Alban Ivanov, Assa Sylla and Samir Decazza. It was released on Netflix on 30 July 2021.

== Plot ==
Richard Brumere is a secret agent who worked for the government. During an operation, Richard had impregnated the ex-wife of his friend Jouard. The two have a son named Archibald al Mahmoud. His wife asks that her son be given two things: money given by the government and someone to take care of him.

An agent by the name of Fernand was assigned to take care of him and did so for the past couple of years. Archibald never knew his father, so he always assumed Fernand was his dad. Meanwhile, at a bank, Ministre Sivardiere had discovered a fake employee providing Archibald al Mahmoud with money for the past couple of years. Also, Archibald al Mahmoud was considered a terrorist wanted for arms and drug trafficking. Sivardiere had shut down the money, which also erased the immunity, leading government agents to pursue him. Agents show up at his home, and with the use of a device only known as the Big Mac, Fernand has a heart attack after his pacemaker fails due to the Big Mac frying the electrical signal. Archibald tries to get away but is arrested. He is interrogated about his alleged activities but is passed out.

Richard finds out about his son and how he's being held by the government and stages a rescue. After a lengthy brawl with agents, Richard saves his son but does not disclose he is the father by using the alias, George.

While getting away and kidnapping a willing Sivardiere, Richard is exposed, and Archibald feels betrayed. Richard reminisces about his wife twirling the pendant around her finger. Archibald comes out and realizes he was the man who comforted him at the funeral, realizing he was never truly abandoned. After recovering the Big Mac, Jouard realizes that Richard still had to be taken in for the events of the prior operation Cup-and-Ball. Richard triggers the Big Mac killing the power in the building and escaping but still promises to be there for his son.

== Cast ==
- Jean-Claude Van Damme as Richard Brumère / The Mist
- Eric Judor as Paul Lesueur
- Miou-Miou as Marguerite
- Patrick Timsit as Commandant Jouard
- Alban Ivanov as Alexandre
- Assa Sylla as Dalila
- Samir Decazza as Archibald
- Valérie Kaprisky as Ministre Sivardière
- Michel Crémadès as Fernand
- Nassim Lyes as Simyon Novak
- Anna Vlasova as Female henchwoman(1)
- Karyna Bershadskaya as Female henchwoman(2)
- Oleksiy Gorbunov

== Reception ==
On the review aggregator website Rotten Tomatoes, 58% of 26 critics' reviews are positive, with an average rating of 5.3/10. Metacritic, which uses a weighted average, assigned the film a score of 48 out of 100, based on 9 critics, indicating "mixed or average" reviews.
