= Marinette (film) =

2023 biographical sports drama film

- Theatrical release poster
- Directed by: Virginie Verrier
- Screenplay by: Virginie Verrier
- Based on: Ne jamais rien lâcher by Marinette Pichon
- Produced by: Virginie Verrier
- Starring: Garance Marillier; Émilie Dequenne; Alban Lenoir; Fred Testot; Sylvie Testud; Caroline Proust
- Cinematography: Xavier Dolléans
- Edited by: Jérôme Bréau
- Music by: Jean-Fabien Dijoud
- Production companies: Vigo Films; France 3 Cinéma; Beside Films
- Distributed by: The Jokers Films
- Release date: 7 June 2023 (France)
- Running time: 95 minutes
- Country: France
- Language: French
- Budget: €5.5–7 million
- Box office: 331,108

Marinette is a 2023 French biographical sports drama film written, produced and directed by Virginie Verrier. The film stars Garance Marillier as Marinette Pichon, a pioneer of French women's football. It is based on Pichon's 2018 autobiography Ne jamais rien lâcher. It was theatrically released in France on 7 June 2023.

== Synopsis ==
Passionate about playing football since childhood, Marinette proved her skills in a boys' club, encouraged by the local coach, but had to leave at the age of 16 in accordance with rules of the federation.

At home, her mother is the victim of her abusive alcoholic father. Marinette works odd jobs before being recruited by the Saint-Memmie Olympique women's football club. She established herself as a talented striker and joined the France women's national football team, but the toxic atmosphere in the group pushed her to refuse a selection, for which she received a six-month suspension.

Recruited by the Philadelphia Charge women's football team in the United States, she left France with her mother, becoming the first French football player to sign on to an American professional league, where she earns a record in the number of goals per game. Marinette does not have to hide her sexual orientation in the U.S., but when the Women's United Soccer Association goes bankrupt, she returns to France.

Back in France, Marinette meets the love of her life and confronts homophobia. She also publicly campaigns for equal rights for women in French sports and for the professionalisation of women's football. By the end of the story, Marinette is regarded as one of the greatest female footballers in French history.

== Cast ==
- Garance Marillier as Marinette Pichon
- Émilie Dequenne as Marinette's mother
- Alban Lenoir as le père de Marinette's father
- Fred Testot as the coach in Brienne-le-Château
- Sylvie Testud as the coach of Saint-Memmie Olympique
- Caroline Proust as the coach of the France women's national football team
- June Benard as Marinette (child)
- Yamé Pertzing as Marinette (adolescent)
- Louisa Chas as Marinette's sister (adult)
- Franck Andrieux as Jean-Claude
- Éloïse Bernazzi as Marinette's sister (adolescent)
- Serge Dupire as village doctor
- Gore Abrams as the coach Mark Krikorian
- Éric Théobald as a press conference reporter

== Production ==
A biographical film project on Marinette Pichon, presented as "the portrait of a girl from a working-class background with nothing to predestine her to this extraordinary career", was first revealed in early 2022. The director-screenwriter Virginie Verrier admitted being partly inspired by the feature film I, Tonya (2017) about the American figure skater Tonya Harding. According to Verrier, the film's themes include "violence against women and within families, sports as a means of empowerment [...], homosexuality, disability, harassment." According to Première, the film is the first non-fictional biopic on a sportswoman made in France.

The first actress Verrier sent the script to was Garance Marillier, who accepted the offer immediately. Before being cast in the film, Marillier had been playing football for many years. Verrier had considered casting either a professional footballer who could be "taught to act" or a "sporty actress who could be taught to play football". She selected Marillier to play the lead after watching an Instagram video of Marillier talking about the fact that she played football. Marillier trained for months with two coaches and studied Marinette Pichon's movements and physical condition. She also spoke at length with Pichon, who gave her personal training.

The film was produced by Verrier through her own company Vigo Films in co-production with France 3 Cinéma and Beside Films, with the participation of Canal+, Ciné+, France Télévisions and Pictanovo, with the support of the Hauts-de-France region and the Somme department. When production began, the film was said to have a total budget of 5.5 million euros, which was later reported to be 7 million euros.

Principal photography began in Abbeville on 31 January 2022. Filming took place primarily in the Somme department: in Abbeville, Albert, Villers-Bretonneux and Montdidier. Additional filming took place in Valenciennes (Nord), Le Touquet (Pas-de-Calais) and in the Île-de-France region. Filming was originally planned to take place in Philadelphia, but according to Verrier it "logistically simpler to stay in France". Le Touquet was used to depict moments from Pichon's life in the United States. Filming lasted for a total of 39 days spread out until April 2022.

== Release ==
The film was theatrically released in France on 7 June 2023 by The Jokers Films. International sales are handled by Pulsar Content and Have A Good One (HAGO).

== Reception ==
On AlloCiné, the film received an average rating of 3.0 out of 5 stars, based on 22 reviews from French critics.

François Forestier of L'Obs wrote, "The power of the film comes from the contrast between the abject conditions Pichon experienced at home and her dazzling professional success within an industry dominated by men. Garance Marillier gives the film an electric charge: this girl is the bomb."
