= Assa Sylla =

French actress and writer (born 1996)

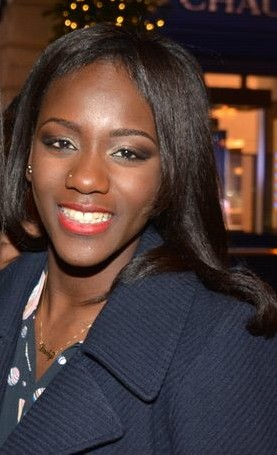
- Sylla in 2015
- Born: Assa Aïcha Sylla; 3 June 1996 (age 29); 15th arrondissement, Paris, France
- Occupation: Actress
- Years active: 2014–present

Assa Aïcha Sylla (born 3 June 1996) is a French actress and writer. She debuted in the film Girlhood (2014), which earned her César and Black Reel Award nominations. She has since starred in the French version of Skam (2018–2020), the Netflix series Mortel (2019), and the film The Last Mercenary (2021).

== Early life ==
Sylla was born in the 15th arrondissement of Paris south of the river to Soninke parents from Mauritania, her father a cleaner and her mother a stay-at-home mother, and grew up in the Barbès area of the 18th arrondissement north of the river. She has three sisters and two brothers. She is Muslim.

Sylla attended Lycée Edgar Quinet Filières Professionnelles. She was scouted at 17 by the Girlhood casting directors when she accompanied her friends to the auditions. Then, she played the role of the Franco-Malian boxer Aya Cissoko in Danbé, la tête haute - portraying the boxer's teenage years. For this role, she took intensive boxing lessons whilst continuing to study for her baccalauréat professionnel.

== Bibliography ==
- "Raising Hope" in My Profession is Not Black by Aïssa Maïga (2018)

== Filmography ==
=== Film ===
Year	Title	Role	Notes
2014	Girlhood (French: Bande de filles)	Lady / Sophie	
2016	Verdon Secret	Clara	
2016	Na tout pour elle	Aminata	Short film
2017	Accidental Family	Young Woman	
2017	Lola Pater	Caroline	
2017	Chateau	Starting Woman	
2018	Blue Queen	Nina	Short film
2019	Plus jamais je ne t'aimerai	Assa	Short film
2019	Numéro 10	Awa	Short film
2021	The Last Mercenary	Dalila	
2022	Umami		
2024	Le Roi des ombres		

=== Television ===
Year	Title	Role	Notes
2014	Danbé, Head Held High (French: Danbé, la tête haute)	16-year-old Aya Cissoko	Television film
2014	Spiral	Vanessa	1 episode
2014	Falco	Jennifer	Episode: "À l'état brut"
2018–2020	Skam France	Imane Bakhellal	Main role (seasons 1–5); Recurring role (season 6)
2019	Mortel	Nora Cissoko	Main role
2021	Regard noir	Herself	Documentary
2024	Nonkels	Safa Ngogo	Season 2

=== Web ===
Year	Title	Role	Notes
2019	Golden Moustache		Episode: "Le Nouveau Don Juan"

== Awards and nominations ==
Year	Award	Category	Work	Result	Ref
2015	César Awards	Most Promising Actress	Girlhood	Nominated	
2016	Black Reel Awards	Outstanding Breakthrough Performance – Female	Girlhood	Nominated	
