= Lycée Dorian =

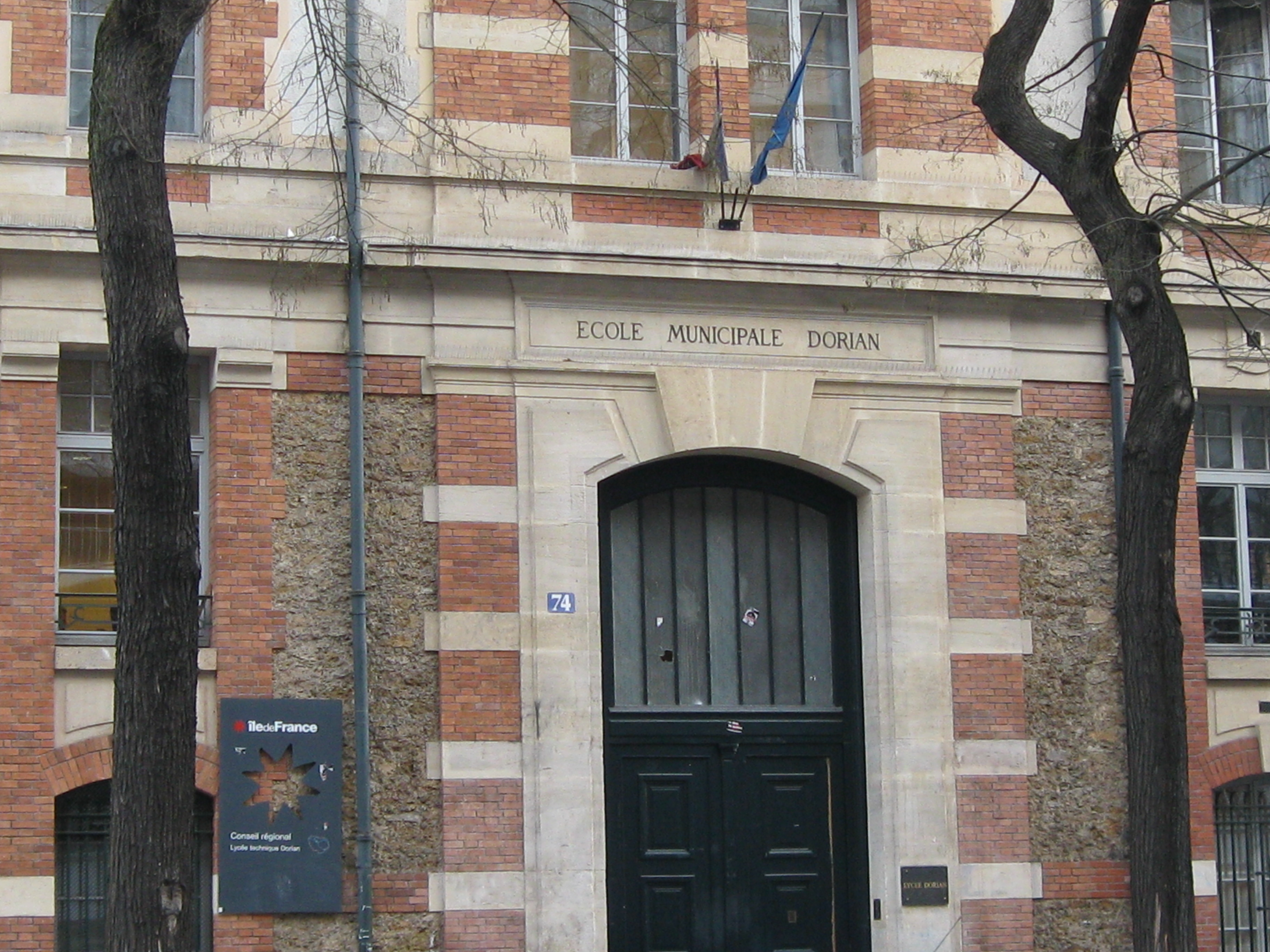
- Main entrance to the lycée Dorian, at 74 avenue Philippe-Auguste in the 11th arrondissement of Paris

Location
- 74 avenue Philippe-Auguste, Paris; France
- 48.854563°N 2.392678°E

Information
- Type: Établissement public local d'enseignement (EPLE)
- Established: 1887
- Enrollment: 758 students (in 2009)
- Website: lyc-dorian.ac-paris.fr

The lycée Dorian is a multi-functional school in the 11th arrondissement of Paris, founded in 1887, with a focus on science and technology.

== History ==
Founded in 1872 by Caroline Dorian, wife of Pierre-Frédéric Dorian, as an institution for the orphans of the Franco-Prussian War, it turned into a municipal primary boarding school in 1887, then successively into a professional upper primary school (1893), a municipal technical college (1945), a municipal technical lycée (1957) before finally being nationalised in 1976.

While the lycée Dorian is historically a technology college, it also runs general education and professional classes (second SES and preparation for the bac S and ES).

Building E, built in 1993, houses glass workshops and other dedicated technology classes, as well as boarders and catering. The older buildings were renovated between 2002 and 2005; the lycée is now a mix of old and modern architecture.

== Teaching ==
As of 2018, the school gives the following courses:

- Streams in general education and technology S, ES and STI2D (with options of SIN and ITEC, and AC since 2018),
- Training in arts and glasswork, with other trade techniques at CAP and BMA,
- BTS (geometry, maintenance, products, industrial product design, IT and production systems, IRIS),
- BT in topography,
- Licence professionnelle (optical instrumentation and visualisation) in partnership with the University of Paris VI,
- PT preparatory classes consisting of preparation for Arts et Métiers ParisTech opened in 1946.

The lycée has around 850 students, including 250 post-bac and 150 in the professional section who are at the boarding school.

=== Lycée ranking ===
In 2017, the lycée was ranked 91st out of 109 at départemental level in terms of teaching quality, and 1389th at national level. The ranking is based on 3 criteria: bac results, the proportion of students who obtained their results when studying for their last two years at the establishment, and "added value" (calculated based on social origin of the students, their age, and their national diploma results).

=== CPGE rankings ===
The national classes préparatoires aux grandes écoles (CPGE) rankings measure the proportion of students who go on to grandes écoles.

In 2017, L'Étudiant gave the following rankings for 2016:

Stream	Students admitted to a grande école^{*}	Admission rate^{*}	Average rate over 5 years	National ranking
PT / PT*	16 / 35 students	45,7 %	36,1 %	8th out of 64
Source: Classement 2017 des prépas - L'Étudiant (Concours de 2016). * the admission rate depends upon the grandes écoles included in the study. For scientific stream, there is a group of 11 eleven engineering schools selected by L'Étudiant for the PT stream.

== Transport ==
Thee lycée is accessible by the lines:

- Philippe Auguste and Alexandre Dumas
- Rue des Boulets
- Bus (RATP) RATP bus routes from 20 to 99#Ligne 56.
