= Pregnancy denial =

Unawareness of active pregnancy

Pregnancy denial (also called cryptic pregnancy) is an unawareness of one's active pregnancy.

== Causes ==
Pregnancy denial can be related to a psychiatric condition, past trauma, a subconscious desire not to be pregnant, and/or physical symptoms being suppressed and subsequently going unnoticed.

== Characteristics ==
A woman's significant others and physicians are usually unaware of the pregnancy as well.

== Management ==
When a psychotic pregnancy denial is discovered, preterm birth via caesarean section is to be considered due to the risk of the woman engaging in self-destructive behaviors during pregnancy or vaginal delivery that harm the fetus.

== See also ==
- False pregnancy
