= Maxence Danet-Fauvel =

French actor and model (born 1993)

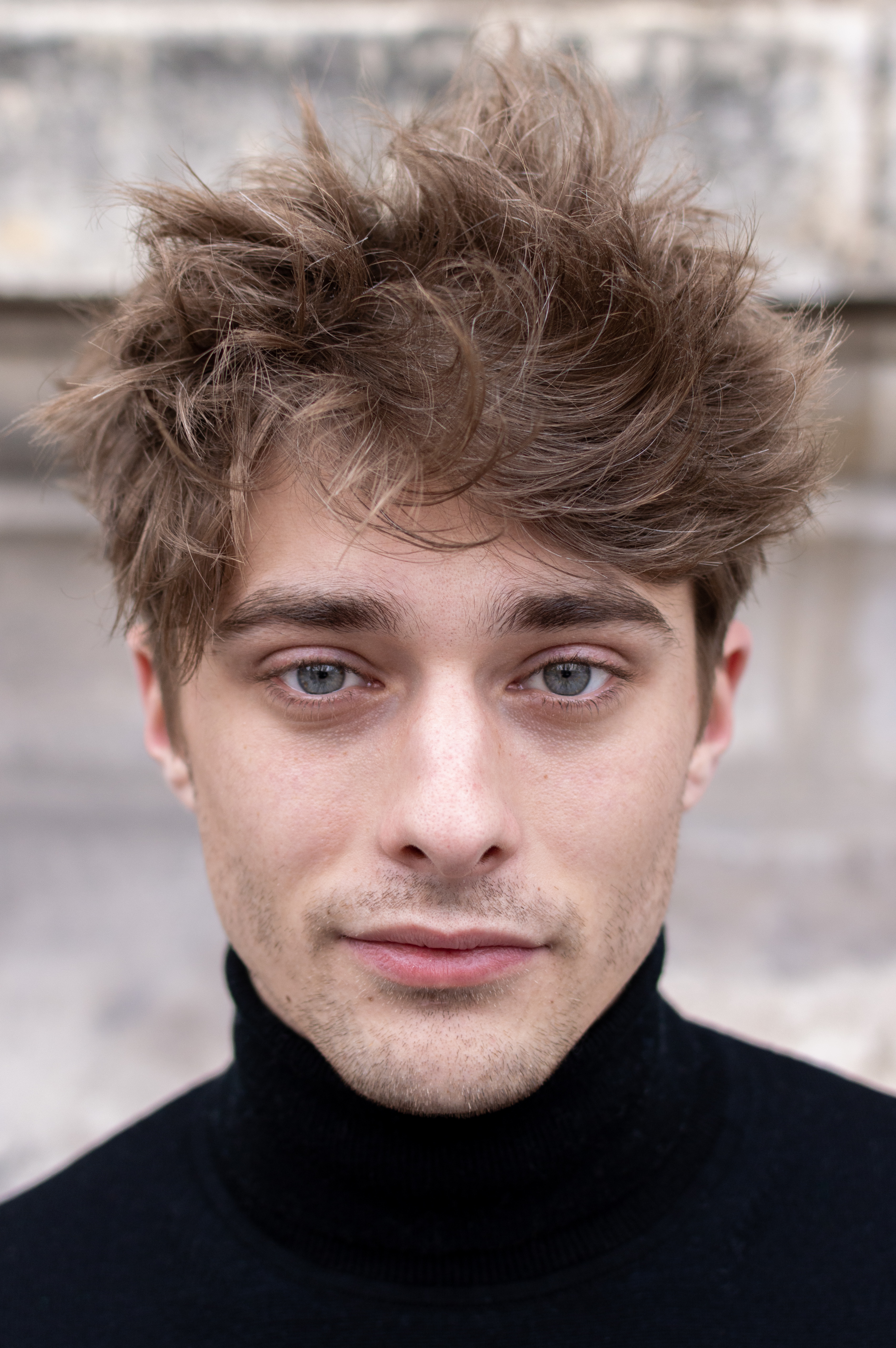
- Born: 27 June 1993 (age 33); Rouen, France
- Occupations: Actor, model
- Employer: Elite Model Management
- Organization: Actors Factory
- Known for: Skam France

Maxence Danet-Fauvel (born 27 June 1993) is a French actor and model.

He is best known for the role of Eliott Demaury in the TV series Skam France, an adaptation of Skam, portraying as the counterpart of Even Bech Næsheim. The House of Gaunt, Police de Caractères.

He started modeling in 2015 and works for Elite Model Management. In 2016, he joined the Actors Factory in Paris.

In 2021, he starred as Tom Riddle in The House of Gaunt: Lord Voldemort Origins, a non-commercial fan film.
