= List of Borgen episodes =

This is a list of episodes of the television series Borgen, a Danish political drama created by Adam Price with co-writers Jeppe Gjervig Gram and Tobias Lindholm and produced by DR, the Danish public broadcaster. Borgen is set in Copenhagen. Politician Birgitte Nyborg becomes the first female Prime Minister of Denmark against all the odds. Four series have been made, three of which consist of ten episodes each, and the fourth one eight.

The programme has also been broadcast in various countries outside Denmark, including the United Kingdom, the United States, Italy, Spain, the Netherlands, Belgium, Portugal and Australia. In the UK, the first season was aired on BBC Four during the first few weeks of 2012, and the second season was aired in January 2013. In the US, Link TV aired the first season in the fall of 2011 and the second in the summer of 2012.

Each episode of Borgen begins with an epigraph related to that episode's theme; these epigraphs are listed along with the episode summaries below.

== Series overview ==
Series	Episodes	Originally released	
Series	Episodes	First released	Last released
1	10	26 September 2010	28 November 2010
2	10	25 September 2011	27 November 2011
3	10	1 January 2013	10 March 2013
4	8	13 February 2022	3 April 2022

== Episodes ==
=== Series 1 (2010) ===
No. overall	No. in series	Title	Danish air date (DR1 and DR HD)	UK air date (BBC Four)	Danish ratings	UK ratings (BBC Four)
1	1	"Decency in the Middle" "Dyden i midten"	26 September 2010	7 January 2012	1,306,000 (DR1); 148,000 (DR HD)	776,000
Epigraph: "A prince should have no other aim or thought but war and its organisation and discipline." – Machiavelli Elections approach in Denmark with the governing Liberal Party and the opposition Labour Party neck and neck. Birgitte Nyborg, to the disbelief of her cynical spin doctor Kasper Juul, withdraws her centrist Moderate Party from the opposition bloc when Labour leader Michael Laugesen reverses his position on asylum seekers in a gambit for votes. Just when the Moderates' electoral prospects seem ruined, Kasper receives a call from his ex-girlfriend, TV1 journalist Katrine Fønsmark, who reveals that she has been having an affair with Prime Minister Lars Hesselboe's chief of staff, Ole Dahl, who has just died from a heart attack during one of their trysts. While removing the evidence of Katrine's presence after sending her home, Kasper finds a receipt among Ole's papers showing that Hesselboe made extravagant purchases for his wife in London using his government credit card. When Birgitte refuses to use the receipt, he gives it to Laugesen, who dramatically reveals it during an election debate. Furious, Birgitte fires Kasper, but the election results go in her favour: Laugesen's grandstanding and Hesselboe's financial wrongdoings result in losses for both Labour and the Liberals, while Birgitte's passionate and principled performance nets the Moderates historic gains. Suddenly it seems like Birgitte's party may be asked to form a government, with her as prime minister.
2	2	"Count to 90" "Tæl til 90"	3 October 2010	7 January 2012	1,366,000 (DR1); 123,000 (DR HD)	638,000
Epigraph: "The prince knows that it is far safer to be feared than loved." – Machiavelli Birgitte is appointed Royal Investigator by the Queen and begins to hold talks with the other parties. Laugesen, backed by the other left-wing parties, demands that she step down and recommend him to take her place, offering her the Foreign and Justice Ministries along with minor portfolios. Hesselboe, too, approaches her, offering her several ministries, including a new Ministry of International Development, if she joins a right-wing coalition under the Liberals. However, Laugesen's second-in-command Troels Höxenhaven, whose wishes to be Justice Minister have been dashed, secretly offers to release xenophobic e-mails written by Laugesen if she agrees to support him. Thinking Höxenhaven a better choice than Laugesen, she gives her consent, but Labour instead chooses Bjørn Marrot as its new leader. Despairing, Birgitte considers accepting Hesselboe's offer but decides to persevere after a talk with her mentor Bent Sejrø. She goes to Marrot and delivers an ultimatum: either Labour backs her, or she accepts Hesselboe's offer. She also courts the Greens with the new Ministry of International Development Hesselboe had offered her. Her gambit works, and Birgitte forms a Moderate-led center-left government with her at its head.
3	3	"The Art of the Possible" "Det muliges kunst"	10 October 2010	14 January 2012	1,279,000 (DR1); 171,000 (DR HD)	750,000
Epigraph: "Democracy is the worst form of government, except all the others that have been tried." – Churchill Birgitte faces her first major test as prime minister in passing a budget when two Labour MPs refuse to vote for it, forcing Birgitte to negotiate when she would rather be with her family for the holidays. The MPs demand a six-billion krone highway in exchange for their support, and Birgitte scrambles to find the funds. She soon realizes that the real cause for their revolt is because they remain loyal to Laugesen, now editor-in-chief at the tabloid Ekspres. Laugesen is using his new paper to spread rumours about Birgitte's government, including one that Birgitte is having an affair with her new spin doctor, the rhetoric professor Tore Gudme. When Tore delivers a tone-deaf, elitist response to Laugesen's insinuations on live TV, Birgitte fires him and reenlists Kasper Juul. Kasper convinces her to turn not to Lars Hesselboe but to Yvonne Kjær, leader of the Liberals' coalition partner, the New Right. In the meantime, Katrine Fønsmark discovers she is pregnant with Ole's child. She initially decides to keep it, despite Kasper urging her to terminate the pregnancy; only an awkward graveside exchange with Ole's widow convinces her that abortion is the right option.
4	4	"100 Days" "100 dage"	17 October 2010	14 January 2012	1,266,000 (DR1); 147,000 (DR HD)	571,000
Epigraph: "Denying the existence of a ghost will only make it grow bigger." – Greenlandic proverb Katrine receives evidence from an anonymous source that an American prisoner transport has been moving illegally detained prisoners through Greenland. Birgitte is stymied in her efforts to obtain this information from either the Americans or her own civil service. As Katrine investigates the story, first with the support of her superior Torben and then on her own, she receives a threatening visit from the police Special Branch. Eventually, TV1 obtains flight logs and images proving that the flights did occur and that the men are Afghani nationals detained illegally. The entire station is charged, and Torben's superiors force them to go ahead with a weaker version of the story. Finally, Katrine's source agrees to appear on television and tell his story, only to pull out at the last moment when he is threatened with the exposure of past misdeeds. Meanwhile, Birgitte visits Greenland, meeting with their prime minister, Jens Enok Berthelsen, and becoming acquainted with the dire situation there. She comes to believe that Denmark has played a substantial role in the nation's ongoing suffering, and commits to improving their situation in the future.
5	5	"Men Who Love Women" "Mænd der elsker kvinder"	24 October 2010	21 January 2012	1,300,000 (DR1); 170,000 (DR HD)	701,000
Epigraph: "Hence it comes that all armed prophets have been victorious and all unarmed prophets have been destroyed." – Machiavelli The episode title is a reference to The Girl with the Dragon Tattoo, which was titled Men Who Hate Women in Danish. A new bill requiring gender equality on the governing boards of all Danish corporations upsets Joachim Crohne, the country's most powerful industrialist. Birgitte's advisers tell her to give in, but she realizes that Crohne, a fierce Danish patriot, would never carry out his threat of pulling out of Denmark, so she calls his bluff and gets her bill. She allows Crohne to save face by allowing his company to be the first to meet the terms of the progressive legislation, a generous deal that earns his respect. In return, Crohne secretly reveals to Birgitte dirt he had on the minister promoting the new bill, forcing Birgitte to fire her.
6	6	"State Visit" "Statsbesøg"	31 October 2010	21 January 2012	1,354,000 (DR1); 157,000 (DR HD)	624,000
Epigraph: "Politics is war without bloodshed. War is politics with bloodshed" – Mao Zedong An official visit by the president of former Soviet republic Turgisia makes headlines when the president demands the arrest of a prominent political activist visiting Denmark at the same time. Birgitte's position is made difficult when the visiting president signs a green energy deal worth billions of krone with a Danish company but makes it conditional on the arrest of the activist, whose resistance activities he considers terrorism. Birgitte temporarily detains the activist, which proves controversial. However, she manages to save face by ensnaring the president into publicly saying that the deal wasn't conditional on the arrest by using a scheme hatched along with Kasper Juul and Katrine Fønsmark.
7	7	"See No Evil, Hear No Evil, Speak No Evil" "Ikke se, ikke høre, ikke tale"	7 November 2010	28 January 2012	1,299,000 (DR1); 167,000 (DR HD)	737,000
Epigraph: "Trust is good, control is better" – Lenin The discovery of illegal surveillance of the Solidarity Party prompts its leader Anne Sophie Lindenkrone, Birgitte's friend, to accuse the government of spying on political opponents. Höxenhaven, Birgitte's Justice Minister responds poorly to questioning in the Danish parliament. Höxenhaven reveals that several years before she entered politics, Lindenkrone was recorded threatening to kidnap Hesselboe's child. Birgitte tells him not to use the tape, but Höxenhaven leaks it to turn public opinion against Lindenkrone. Birgitte's friendship with Lindenkrone is damaged and she lets Höxenhaven remain as Justice Minister given the public's opinion on the case but tells him to consider himself fired.
8	8	"The Silly Season" "Agurketid"	14 November 2010	28 January 2012	1,317,000 (DR1); 158,000 (DR HD)	572,000
Epigraph: "History is a nightmare from which I am trying to wake." – James Joyce While the Prime Minister tries to take a family vacation to the Prime Minister's country manor amid marital problems with her husband Philip, the upcoming publication of a tell-all memoir by the former Labour leader puts the PM's spin doctor Kasper Juul on edge. Kasper Juul seeks to find a review copy of the book so he prepares for its claims. He is particularly worried that his role in handing Hesselboe's receipts to Laugesen will be revealed. Juul ultimately fails to get a copy of the book and deals with the death of his father (who had abused him when he was a child) at the same time. After the book is published, Juul deflects blame by claiming he took the receipt because it was ethical to reveal the Prime Minister's illegal activities and protect Katrine by refusing to disclose where he got them.
9	9	"Divide and Rule" "Del og hersk"	21 November 2010	4 February 2012	1,379,000 (DR1); 157,000 (DR HD)	781,000
Epigraph: "You won't know what hit you before it's too late." – American arms producer Labour Defence Minister, Hans Christian Thorsen comes under fire for accepting expensive gifts from lobbyists promoting the sale of the F-26 Defender to the Danish Air Force. To regain public trust, Birgitte launches a transparency campaign that includes her cabinet. Birgitte's husband, Phillip Christensen, is very upset when he is forced to resign from his new dream job as CEO of a technology company because the company makes a component of the new Danish aircraft.
10	10	"The First Tuesday in October" "Første tirsdag i oktober"	28 November 2010	4 February 2012	1,413,000 (DR1); 143,000 (DR HD)	661,000
Epigraph: "A prince never lacks legitimate reason to break his promise." – Machiavelli A year after taking office, the prime minister's approval ratings are low and her marriage is hanging by a thread. To try and rebuild her public image, she gets Kasper to arrange an interview with TV1 that would show her family as united. Kasper gets Torben to agree to give him full editorial control of the content, which he uses to pull the plug after Phillip asks for a divorce. Katrine finds out and is furious with Torben, and resigns to stand up for journalistic integrity. Kasper is also tasked with writing the annual address to parliament by the Prime Minister, which he struggles to do until he demands to know what Birgitte really wants for Denmark. He then writes a rousing speech that calls on Danes to pull together as a team, which Birgitte delivers to widespread praise.

=== Series 2 (2011) ===
No. overall	No. in series	Title	Danish air date (DR1 and DR HD)	UK air date (BBC Four)	Danish ratings	UK ratings (BBC Four)
11	1	"89,000 Children" "89.000 børn"	25 September 2011	5 January 2013	1,259,000 (DR1); 158,000 (DR HD)	1,187,700 (BBCFour); 147,100 (BBC HD)
Epigraph: "War is just when it is necessary." – Machiavelli A year has passed since our last glimpse of Birgitte Nyborg, who has been Prime Minister for almost two years now. She has become a respected politician, wise in the ways of the political gambit. Birgitte is visiting soldiers stationed in Afghanistan when their encampment comes under attack, claiming the lives of several soldiers. The time has come to choose: Send the troops home or stage a counter-attack. Katrine Fønsmark, now a reporter at the Ekspres, approaches the father of one of the fallen soldiers in order to write a story with a personal angle rather than attacking the Prime Minister as her boss, Laugesen, demands. Kasper Juul divides his time between his job as the PM's spin-doctor and his new girlfriend, Lotte, who is a journalist.
12	2	"In Brussels No One Can Hear You Scream" "I Bruxelles kan ingen høre dig skrige"	2 October 2011	5 January 2013	1,293,000 (DR1); 152,000 (DR HD)	1,026,700 (BBCFour); 90,300 (BBC HD)
Epigraph: "Keep your friends close to you, but your enemies closer." – Sun Tzu Prime Minister Birgitte Nyborg is about to appoint a new EU commissioner. Her old mentor, Sejrø, is an obvious candidate but refuses Birgitte's offer as he feels she is trying to get rid of him. This causes problems for the PM and leads to a tactical power play with serious consequences. Kasper prepares to move into a seaside, designer apartment with new girlfriend, Lotte; but his history with Katrine still haunts him, though they have less contact with each other these days. Katrine and Hanne Holm have become good colleagues, united in their daily battles with their boss, Michael Laugesen, about their journalistic principles. When Sejrø is suddenly taken ill, Birgitte discovers how her protégé, Jakob Kruse, has betrayed her trust and nominates him as commissioner instead.
13	3	"The Last Worker" "Den sidste arbejder"	9 October 2011	12 January 2013	1,269,000 (DR1); 151,000 (DR HD)	879,000 (BBC Four); 127,000 (BBC HD)
Epigraph: "Ours is one hell of a victory." – Thomas Nielsen, former leader of the LO Birgitte's government prepares to present a new reform package – "A Common Future" – which is being polished at a political seminar. But there is unrest in Labour when party leader Bjørn Marrot comes under personal attack in the media. Birgitte senses a rebellion brewing, and the seminar dissolves in chaos. Meanwhile, pressure grows on the home front, where Phillip has a new girlfriend. Katrine covers the political seminar for Laugesen, who has his own agenda, as it becomes clear that senior Labour minister Hans Christian Thorsen is working behind the scenes to make life difficult for Marrot. Marrot's working-class principles appear outdated in the new coalition environment and he is forced to resign.
14	4	"Battle Ready" "Op til kamp"	16 October 2011	12 January 2013	1,256,000 (DR1); 124,000 (DR HD)	822,000 (BBC Four); 85,200 (BBC HD)
Epigraph: "If an injury is to be done to a man, it should be so severe that his vengeance need not be feared." – Machiavelli After Bjørn Marrot's exit, Troels Höxenhaven steps up his profile as the new party leader, taking the opportunity to exploit the turn of events when pirates hijack a Danish ship off Somalia's coast. Höxenhaven diverts attention from Birgitte, who badly needs a success story. Meanwhile, compromising photos of Höxenhaven with a male lover turn up at the Ekspres. Laugesen wants to print them, but Katrine is skeptical. Birgitte's private life is in tatters, and she is tempted into a one-night stand with her official driver, Kim, who is subsequently moved to another ministry by Kasper. Katrine and Hanne discover how Laugesen has set up Höxenhaven in revenge for his manoeuvring Laugesen out of the party leadership, and refuse to participate in the exposure, but Laugesen approaches Höx in person, resulting in the latter going to Birgitte to hand in his resignation. A sympathetic Birgitte suggests he "come out" publicly, but, unable to face the disgrace, he steals some of her sleeping tablets and commits suicide later that night. Evidence of Laugesen's complicity reaches Birgitte, who makes him promise not to publish the photographs out of respect for Höx's family; Laugesen agrees but makes it clear that he knows all about Birgitte's relationship with Kim.
15	5	"Plant a Tree" "Plant et træ"	23 October 2011	19 January 2013	1,378,000 (DR1); 171,000 (DR HD)	972,000 (BBC Four)
Epigraph: "Much that passes as idealism is disguised love of power." – Bertrand Russell Birgitte Nyborg's government is about to negotiate the environmental element of the new reform package, "A Common Future". Birgitte wants a multi-party agreement and attempts to get the Liberals (led by former PM Lars Hesselboe) on board, but the Green leader, Amir Diwan, is unwilling to compromise. Kasper suggests leaking information about Amir's ownership of a vintage car, but the press reaction goes far beyond what she had intended, culminating in the Greens pulling out of the coalition and Amir resigning as an MP. Katrine receives the offer of a high-profile job as a spin doctor to Hesselboe, which puts her personal beliefs to the test; she agrees on the condition that the Freedom Party, led by Svend Åge Saltum, will have no part in a future Liberal-led coalition; when Hesselboe breaks his word, Katrine returns to her job as a TV1's news anchor and persuades Torben Friis to have Hanne Holm taken on as well. At home, Birgitte's children are clearly affected by their mother's work-related stress; Laura in particular struggles with her absence. When Birgitte forces her to go to summer camp, she has a panic attack and has to be collected by Phillip's girlfriend Cecilie. Birgitte learns that her efficient but unsympathetic secretary, Jytte, has failed to put through Laura's calls, and fires Jytte; she is replaced by Sanne, Birgitte's original secretary.
16	6	"Them and Us" "Dem & os"	30 October 2011	19 January 2013	1,421,000 (DR1); 141,000 (DR HD)	916,000 (BBC Four)
Epigraph: "Love your enemies and pray for those who persecute you." – Matthew 5:44 Just as Birgitte's new government is getting back on track after the Green Party's exit, internal strife erupts among coalition partners, as Svend Åge Saltum submits a bill to lower the age of criminal responsibility to 12 years. Birgitte is shocked by Kasper's violent reaction to Saltum's campaign. Meanwhile, her daughter Laura is recovering from a panic attack, but Birgitte refuses to accept Cecilie's suggestion of antidepressant medication until she has spoken to the psychiatrist in person. Things begin to look bad for the coalition when Saltum is assaulted by an under-age youth, and a parliamentary debate on Saltum's bill can only be won if the government can come up with better alternative wording. Kasper is in the process of clearing out his parents' house, and the experience brings him to the verge of a breakdown; Birgitte threatens to fire him, unaware of the reason for his increasingly unpredictable behaviour, but is moved by his comment that Saltum's bill will rob young people of their childhood. Kasper gives Katrine a videotape and newspaper cuttings revealing the truth about his own traumatic childhood, and they are reconciled. Birgitte, using wording suggested by her conversation with Kasper, wins the debate by one vote.
17	7	"What is Lost Inwardly Must Be Gained Outwardly"Part I "Hvad indad tabes, skal udad vindes"Del I	6 November 2011	26 January 2013	1,518,000 (DR1); 153,000 (DR HD)	939,000 (BBC Four)
Epigraph: "The Dane is a doubter, because Denmark's history is the story of the downfall of a powerful tribe." – Johannes V. Jensen Birgitte's government is losing steam and having difficulty passing legislation. As opinion polls indicate that the coalition will lose the next election, financier Joachim Crohne approaches her to intervene in an African republic where civil war is interfering with his oil business. At first, Birgitte rejects Crohne's suggestion that she put herself forward as an intermediary, but she changes her mind after Saltum criticises government policies on immigration. Having persuaded Amir to join the peace mission, and supported by Bent Sejrø, Birgitte secretly travels to Africa (leaving the children in the care of their father) and successfully negotiates with both sides, initiating peace talks that will take place back in Denmark. Kasper's attempt to keep the visit a secret is uncovered by Katrine, who is highly suspicious of Danish business interests in Africa, but Hanne explains to her why she should not use the information.
18	8	"What is Lost Inwardly Must Be Gained Outwardly"Part II "Hvad indad tabes, skal udad vindes"Del II	13 November 2011	26 January 2013	1,365,000 (DR1); 207,000 (DR HD)	807,000 (BBC Four)
Epigraph: "Take up the white man's burden / The savage wars of peace / Fill full the mouth of Famine / And bid the sickness cease." – Rudyard Kipling The leaders of North and South Kharun arrive in Copenhagen for peace talks, but almost immediately news arrives of an outbreak of hostilities in a disputed border region. Bent Sejrø persuades South Kharun to stay in Copenhagen, then negotiations are threatened again by the news that China is sending military helicopters to North Kharun which will enable them to win the war outright. Birgitte pleads with the Chinese, apparently to no avail, but they relent and the talks continue. Meanwhile, Hanne and Katrine discover that businessman Mikkelsen is involved in ethnic cleansing in Kharun. He diverts them by providing evidence that North Kharun has been cheating the South out of oil revenues, information that threatens the talks once again. When Kasper passes the information to Birgitte, she calls in the news team and begs them to withhold the details to prevent war; they reluctantly agree. When negotiations are almost over, the leader of North Kharun makes additional demands; Birgitte shows him the information she has about his fraudulent dealings and he agrees to compromise. Just as she is being congratulated on the successful conclusion of the peace talks, she is called home because Laura has suffered another panic attack, as a result of stopping her medication.
19	9	"The Sanctity of Private Life" "Privatlivets fred"	20 November 2011	2 February 2013	1,325,000 (DR1); 207,000 (DR HD)	869,000 (BBC Four) 111,000 (BBC HD)
Epigraph: "Success is not final, failure is not fatal: it is the courage to continue that counts." – Churchill Laura's illness has worsened over the past few months, and Birgitte feels guilty. When Laura's psychiatrist suggests admitting her to a private hospital, Birgitte and Phillip immediately agree, but Birgitte's own tax reforms force her to pay out of pocket instead of using insurance; nevertheless, the media find out about the hospital and Laugesen accuses her of hypocrisy. Katrine has told her boss Friis about her relationship with Kasper, and fears it will adversely affect her career, but Friis allows her to interview the prime minister on live television. Rather than backing off, the media become more intrusive, and the hospital manager asks Birgitte and Phillip to remove Laura in order to avoid trauma to the other patients. Birgitte asks for a delay of 24 hours. She makes the shock decision to take leave in order to concentrate on her family. Hans-Christian Thorsen, the Labour Party leader, is appointed to take over during her absence.
20	10	"An Extraordinary Remark" "En bemærkning af særlig karakter"	27 November 2011	2 February 2013	1,351,000 (DR1); 259,000 (DR HD)	857,000 (BBC Four), 107,000 (BBC HD)
Epigraph: "To be or not to be. That is the question" – Shakespeare, Hamlet Birgitte continues with her leave from being Prime Minister to focus on her daughter. She finds herself torn between whether or not she should return to work. She decides to remain on leave until Laura gets better. Meanwhile, as Kasper and Katrine hunt for an apartment, they argue about their having children. When Laura subsequently gets better and Liseholm states she can return home and regularly attend therapy; Birgitte decides to return as prime minister. During her absence, rumours of an election and her being unfit spreads. Laugesen takes it as far as asking if a woman is competent enough to be prime minister. Hesselboe defends Birgitte on television. Her reform bill is narrowly passed in Parliament. In a speech to Parliament after the vote, she responds to Laugesen’s criticism and cites the first three women elected to Parliament in 1918, while also announcing a snap election.

=== Series 3 (2013) ===
No. overall	No. in series	Title	Danish air date (DR1 and DR HD)	UK air date (BBC Four)	Danish ratings	UK ratings (BBC Four)
21	1	"A Child of Denmark" "I Danmark er jeg født"(patriotic song by Hans Christian Andersen); US Title: "In Denmark I was born"	1 January 2013	16 November 2013	1,674,000 (DR1)	1,090,000
Epigraph: "Halfway on my journey through life, I found myself in a dark wood." – Dante, The Divine Comedy Season 3 begins two and a half years later; Birgitte is a lecturer and board member of a pharmaceutical corporation. The Moderate Party, which is led by Kruse, supports the Hesselboe government. Birgitte re-enters politics and challenges him for the leadership. She fails on a close vote and plans to form a new party. Meanwhile, Katrine has split from Kasper and is raising their son with her mother's assistance. She leaves TV1 on becoming Birgitte's spin doctor. Alex Hjort is the new head of TV1.
22	2	"The Land is Built on Law" "Med lov skal land bygges"(first five words on page 4, of part 1, of the Codex Holmiensis); US Title: "With Law Shall Nation Be Built"	6 January 2013	16 November 2013	1,674,000 (DR1)	937,000
Epigraph: "We few, we happy few, we band of brothers…" – Shakespeare, Henry V Birgitte assembles the founding members of her party: the young Moderate MP Nete, her former education minister Jon, and (after some reluctance) the New Right deputy leader Erik Hoffman (who opposes the recent anti-immigrant legislation). Nete warns Birgitte that Jon is not to be trusted politically. Bent maintains his loyalty to the Moderates over his friendship with Birgitte, and attempts to broker a settlement with Kruse that would make her deputy leader but she refuses. Alex's wooing of Katrine to return to TV1 turns into a one-night stand; Torben is greatly offended to learn of this. When her mother calls her an irresponsible parent, Katrine refuses further child-care help. At a press conference she announces the party's name, the New Democrats, and Bent decides to join them.
23	3	"The Right Shade of Brown" "Den rigtige nuance af brun"	13 January 2013	23 November 2013	1,156,000 (DR1)	882,000
Epigraph: "Some men change their party for the sake of their principles — others their principles for the sake of their party." – Winston Churchill Many volunteers are attracted to the new party, mostly with single-issue agendas. Jon gets a large contribution from a banker, but Birgitte returns it when she discovers that Jon's proposed new financial policy includes concessions to the banker's wishes. Torben starts a business show at Alex's suggestion; when Alex objects to a new commentator's negative tone, Torben fires her and incites a staff revolt. The New Democrats enlist the commentator, who is of Pakistani ancestry, to be their immigration spokesperson until they discover her own rather conservative views on immigration. Katrine finds herself attracted to Kasper as they bond through shared parenting, and is frustrated when he does not reciprocate. Birgitte thanks the volunteers but dismisses them, saying the New Democrats must first agree on a common platform.
24	4	"Their Loss…" "Den enes død"(The death of one); US Title: "One Man's Loss"	27 January 2013	23 November 2013	1,322,000 (DR1)	879,000
Epigraph: "Danish pigs are healthy — they're bursting with penicillin." – Danish artist Mikael Witte, 1978 When Birgitte's English boyfriend Jeremy is taken ill at a restaurant, the New Democrats are able to manipulate the resulting media coverage into a debate with Svend-Åge over animal welfare and safety in the Danish pork industry. The end result is a crack in the governing coalition and public recognition of the new party by Hesselboe. Katrine takes Birgitte to her family pig farm to meet her brother for first-hand information. Torben defies Alex over the use of graphic images in the story, risking his job. Katrine and Kasper clash over both child care and her irritability caused by his promiscuity.
25	5	"Thou Shalt Not Commit Adultery" "Du skal ikke bedrive hor"	3 February 2013	30 November 2013	1,466,000 (DR1)	936,000
Epigraph: "The road to hell is paved with good intentions." – Old saying The parliament considers a bill against prostitution after a scandal about sex trade. All parties are in favor of this proposal but the New Democrats want time to investigate the matter more thoroughly. Jeremy reveals that he once visited a prostitute and Birgitte ponders her own point of view after this confession. The proposal is dismissed after revelations that the pressure group behind the bill amassed many subsidies through fraud.
26	6	"Sons of the Past" "Fortidens sønner"	10 February 2013	30 November 2013	1,352,000 (DR1)	838,000
Epigraph: "I like the dreams of the future better than the history of the past." – Thomas Jefferson Birgitte persuades her New Democrat colleagues to accept an academic economist and former communist as one of the party's candidates. However, media investigation uncovers revelations about his communist past that call into question his suitability. Torben feels increasingly under pressure at TV1 and bids to become the new political editor of the Ekspres, but is rejected as too old. Meanwhile Birgitte is told that she has precancerous cells in her breast and must have treatment immediately. She decides to keep the information secret from her colleagues and family.
27	7	"The Fall" "Faldet"	17 February 2013	7 December 2013	1,411,000 (DR1)	860,000
Epigraph: "You can fool some of the people all of the time, and all of the people some of the time, but you can not fool all of the people all of the time." – Abraham Lincoln Hesselboe shocks his political opponents and the media by announcing a snap general election. The New Democrats rush to get themselves ready to fight it. Katrine is furious when Birgitte rejects a TV1 proposal for her movements to be constantly tracked during the campaign. Birgitte's doctor warns her of the negative consequences of not sharing her ongoing medical treatment with her family. Poor preparation and exhaustion lead to a disastrous performance by Birgitte in a televised leaders’ debate.
28	8	"If You Never Change Your Mind" "Man har et standpunkt"(a well-known Jens Otto Krag quote)	24 February 2013	7 December 2013	1,487,000 (DR1)	838,000
Epigraph: "Know well what leads you forward and what holds you back,—and choose the path that leads to wisdom." – Buddha Birgitte admits to her colleagues and the media that she is receiving treatment for cancer. She discusses a joint election platform with the other opposition parties but is told that the New Democrats cannot influence the agreed manifesto. In a joint press conference, Birgitte is marginalised. Meanwhile Torben's wife leaves him after she finds out about his affair with Pia, and he comes under more pressure from Alex. The New Democrats try to emphasise their own policies only to find Kruse putting forward propositions identical to those of the New Democrats. Birgitte suspects a mole and a trap reveals that Nete is the betrayer. Birgitte decides that the New Democrats have to make a clear stand if they are to survive.
29	9	"Sense and Sensibility" "Fornuft og følelse"	3 March 2013	14 December 2013	1,469,000 (DR1)	884,000
Epigraph: “To dare is to lose one's footing momentarily. Not to dare is to lose oneself." – Søren Kierkegaard The opinion polls are predicting five seats for the New Democrats in the coming election. Birgitte is confident her strategy for the New Democrats to go it alone is working out, but believes she has to take on the Moderates to boost their support further, as the differences between the two parties are not that apparent to most voters. In a debate of 'moderate parties', she decides to boldly attack Jacob Kruse. In the final debate on TV1, Kruse is put under pressure by Birgitte about his manifesto and eventually lashes out against her and does not manage to recover from this mistake. Torben ignores the demands of Alex to turn the final TV debate into a game show-style format.
30	10	"The Election" "Valget"	10 March 2013	14 December 2013	1,658,000 (DR1)	883,000
Epigraph: "Nearly all men can stand adversity, but if you want to test a man's character, give him power." – Abraham Lincoln Torben is fired on the morning of election day after refusing to follow Alex's demands, but is reinstated later after his colleagues threaten to strike. Following Kruse's outburst against Nyborg during the last debate on TV1, support for the New Democrats surges on polling day and they manage to capture 13 seats compared to just 5 for the Moderates. Both the Red (left-leaning) and Blue (right-leaning) coalition try to pull the New Democrats into their government as both need the New Democrats to make a majority in parliament. Birgitte is offered the post of Prime Minister with the Red coalition, but this would include the Freedom Party whose anti-immigration policies are diametrically opposed to the values of the New Democrats. Ultimately she decides to join the Blue coalition, and the series ends with Birgitte on her way to Borgen as the new Minister for Foreign Affairs.

=== Series 4 (2022) Borgen – Power and Glory ===
No. overall	No. in series	Title	Danish air date (DR1 and DR HD)	UK air date (BBC Four)	Danish ratings	UK ratings (BBC Four)
31	1	"The Future Is Female"	13 February 2022	TBA	785,000 (DR1)	TBA
Epigraph: "Man is the only animal, whose desires increase as they are fed." – Henry George Oil has been discovered in Greenland, and their foreign minister, Hans Eliassen, announces the news against the advice of his Danish counterpart, Birgitte Nyborg. Having recently been elected on a climate change manifesto, Birgitte attempts to dissuade Greenland from opting to use the oil. Katrine Fønsmark, now in a relationship with Søren Ravn, starts her new job as head of news at TV1, to much applause from staff and high expectations. Birgitte discovers that her arctic ambassador, Kaare Mathiesen, leaked news to the media about the oil find in Greenland. She elevates his deputy, Asger Holm Kirkegaard, as acting ambassador. He uncovers that the Canadian oil company charged with handling the oil is actually owned by a Russian company headed by Mikhail Gamov, a former Russian minister and close friend of the Russian President. Prime Minister Signe Kragh's planned appointment of her former Labour party leader, Michael Laugesen, as her chief of staff is leaked by Birgitte, which forces her not to appoint him after pressure from the opposition due to him not being an MP or civil servant in such a powerful new role.
32	2	"The Lesser of Two Evils" "Pest eller kolera"	20 February 2022	TBA	679,000 (DR1)	TBA
Epigraph: "There is little difference between obstacle and opportunity. The wise are able to turn both to their advantage." – Machiavelli Birgitte learns from the Swedish foreign minister that Mikhail Gamov has past history with money laundering and having ties with the Russian mafia. Asger arrives in Greenland and is surprised that Hans Eliassen invites him to negotiate without advisers. He later joins Malik Johansen and his sister Tanja, the adopted children of Hans, at the drilling site. He confronts one of the company's leading members, Caroline Martin, about its connection with Gamov. Malik continues to be urged to spy on his employer, which he finally does by placing a bugged tea holder, and flees before Caroline can confront him. In Denmark, Birgitte shares her info about Gamov with the American ambassador, Richard Stranton. At a later meeting, he asks her to withhold the info about Gamov while the CIA works to pressure the Russians, also adding that the US considers her a candidate for the post of Secretary-General of the United Nations. She attends a meeting of the parliamentary foreign affairs committee, where she is unexpectedly confronted with info about Gamov from one of its members. Afterwards, she asks Rasmus Gren Lundbæk, the foreign ministry's permanent secretary, to look into the matter. Malik Johansen's body is found at the edge of an icy cliff.
33	3	"Inuit Nunaat: Land of the People" "Inuit Nunaat Menneskenes Land"	27 February 2022	TBA	608,000 (DR1)	TBA
Epigraph: "Nature is great, but man is greater still." – Knud Rasmussen Malik is buried and a funeral is held. Asger finds a common fascination for Knud Rasmussen with Emmy Rasmussen, the Greenlandic premier's department head, while also preparing environmental talking points. In Denmark, Magnus lands in trouble with the police for his involvement in breaking free a truck of pigs. Birgitte lands in hot water when TV1 learns of her question in the Foreign Committee about Gamov. The case grows and the opposition threatens a confidence vote after Jens Enok Berthelsen, now an MP for Greenland, withdraws his support. Signe Kragh urges Birgitte to solve her problems herself. She seeks advice from a now retired Bent, who recommends that she maintains her position. Katrine puts her news team on alert in an expectation for Birgitte to resign. Instead, she changes political standpoint in a live interview, vowing for a green and democratic oil exploration. Torben gains more info on the Gamov case, and Katrine uncovers text messages where Birgitte's personal secretary, Oliver Hjorth, requested a meeting with her Swedish counterpart prior to the Foreign Committee meeting.
34	4	"The Minister Doesn’t Wish to Comment" "Ministeren ønsker ikke at udtale sig"	6 March 2022	TBA	624,000 (DR1)	TBA
Epigraph: "How on earth are you going to manage in Great Big Denmark?" – Niviaq Korneliussen, Blomsterdalen TV1 confronts Birgitte with Oliver's text messages, who gets to keep his job despite his major mistake. Birgitte experiences discontent within her own party due to her stance change on Greenland's oil. Prime Minister Kragh calls her in for a meeting, calling it undemocratic how she declined to comment via email and recommends she come clean to the media. She learns from the Chinese ambassador, Tao Ying, that a Chinese company has bought into Gamov's oil company. Asger returns to Denmark for the oil revenue negotiations with Greenland. Birgitte lashes out at Hans for not looking at the independence prospect realistically, and he storms out of the negotiations. Rasmus recommends Birgitte appoint a spin doctor. Channel 2 publishes an article on Magnus' case. Asger goes out with Emmy, and Michael Laugesen surprisingly defends Birgitte on television.
35	5	"A Near-Arctic State"	13 March 2022	TBA	663,000 (DR1)	TBA
Epigraph: "Let China sleep, for when she wakens, the world will tremble." – Napoleon Bonaparte Hans returns to Greenland, putting a definitive end to the oil negotiations with Denmark. Birgitte appoints Laugesen as her spin doctor, who helps her coordinate her social media presence. Kragh and Birgitte hold a joint press conference to address the Greenland situation. Asger and Emmy return to Greenland, where he meets with the Chinese owners, and later speaks to a man named Josva Johansen about the Chinese wanting to build a harbour in his fishing area. Johansen reveals that he has already sold the area for the harbour to be built. Birgitte meets the United States Secretary of State, Ted Wayne, in Germany and is advised to make the Chinese leave Greenland. At TV1, Katrine's conflict with her lead evening news anchor, Narciza, reaches a breaking point when she diverts from her orders in an interview with the Chinese ambassador. After speaking to HR, they agree to fire Narciza. Birgitte and Magnus go on television to clear the air about the pig case. An unidentified drone crashes in Greenland.
36	6	"Power in Denmark" "Magtens Danmark"	20 March 2022	TBA	623,000 (DR1)	TBA
Epigraph: "Every battle is won before it's ever fought." – Sun Tzu Jon Berthelsen, the justice minister and Birgitte's party deputy leader, informs her that it would be impossible to go around the Chinese owners of the Greenland oil company without breaching the contract. Nadia Barazani, now the environment minister, goes to the media with expert statistics and concerns about the environment, breaking from the government's current stance on the issue. In Greenland, Asger is sent to the Arctic Command as the foreign ministry's representative. Birgitte hands Hans Eliassen an informal invitation to attend as well, and he sends Emmy as Greenland's representative. Sirius Patrol heads to the crash site of the unknown drone, discovering camouflaged soldiers attempting to retrieve something from it. They fire a warning shot, causing the soldiers to flee. Birgitte proposes a compromise to the US and China: everything must be authorised by and overseen by Denmark and Greenland via a joint buffer company. This pleases the US, and China reluctantly agrees. Katrine faces pressure from the board of TV1 to rehire Narciza. During a FaceTime call with Asger, Birgitte spots Emmy's necklace and is outraged that he slept with her. Barazani leaves Birgitte a voicemail, announcing her resignation as minister and departure from the New Democrats.
37	7	"Just Make It Go Away"	27 March 2022	TBA	585,000 (DR1)	TBA
Epigraph: "It is in the nature of power that it can also lead to abuse." – Immanuel Kant The US announces that the Russians violated Danish territory when their submarine surfaced simultaneously as the drone, revealed to be an unarmed Chinese copy of an American military drone, crashed. Birgitte speaks severely to Asger, but decides to keep him despite his affair with Emmy. He returns to Greenland, where Hans Eliassen proposes that only 25% of the oil revenue would go to Denmark. He also shares his suspicions about Malik not having committed suicide with Birgitte, believing he was part of an intelligence operation that went wrong. Katrine rehires Narciza as news anchor, on the condition she gets a larger salary. Torben is also made political editor, but after he makes an interview appearance with Narciza criticizing the government's evasion of journalistic scrutiny, TV1's new board chair tells Katrine to quiet Torben until their new media agreement with the government has been finalised. Oliver encounters Birgitte with Laugesen, and confides in Rasmus about loyalty, who tells him he should remain loyal to the ministry. TV1 invites Birgitte and Magnus to a TV interview on political families, after he criticises her on Instagram, where they harshly debate on climate issues. With growing discontent in the New Democrats, a group meeting is called and Birgitte is kept as party leader by a narrow majority in favour of her position against withdrawing from government after Birgitte had appointed one of Jon Berthelsen's supporters as new environment minister. In a cabinet meeting, the finance minister proposes a 50–50 share of oil revenue between Denmark and Greenland. Asger puts this to Eliassen, in addition to the establishment of an oil company involving Denmark, Greenland and China that was agreed to by the Americans as a condition for accepting a Chinese presence (along with a new American harbour to counter the new Chinese harbour). Kragh decides to appoint Birgitte as deputy prime minister. Berthelsen visits Birgitte and informs her that he will challenge her leadership in the party.
38	8	"Mother of the Sea" "Havets Moder"	3 April 2022	TBA	672,000 (DR1)	TBA
Epigraph: "It is not because things are difficult that we do not dare, it is because we do not dare that they are difficult." – Seneca Kragh asks Birgitte to head to Greenland to sign the oil contract between Denmark, Greenland and China. With American fighter jets disturbing her speech, Birgitte begins to have second thoughts after signing the agreement and having a disagreement with her Greenlandic counterpart. At the extraordinary party congress, Bent Sejrø surprisingly endorses Berthelsen for leader, stating that Birgitte has lost her humanising ways. In her own speech, having made last minute several changes, Birgitte acknowledges Sejrø's criticism and shockingly announces that she will step down as leader and endorses Berthelsen. Katrine resigns as head of news to take care of her family, and decides to make a book together with Torben, titled Power in Denmark. Birgitte gives Kragh an application for a nomination, which Kragh is intrigued by. The oil agreement between Denmark, Greenland and China is scrapped after the Americans grow impatient with China's continuous presence in Greenland. In a cabinet reshuffle, Berthelsen succeeds Birgitte as foreign minister, while rumours suggest that she might be nominated as Denmark's next EU commissioner.
