= Ragnarok (TV series) =

Norwegian fantasy television series

- Promotional poster
- Genre: Fantasy; Drama; Superhero
- Created by: Adam Price
- Written by: Adam Price; Simen Alsvik; Marietta von Hausswolff von Baumgarten; Christian Gamst Miller-Harris; Jacob Katz Hansen
- Directed by: Mogens Hagedorn; Jannik Johansen; Mads Kamp Thulstrup
- Starring: David Stakston; Jonas Strand Gravli; Herman Tømmeraas; Theresa Frostad Eggesbø; Emma Bones; Henriette Steenstrup; Gísli Örn Garðarsson; Synnøve Macody Lund
- Composer: Halfdan E
- Countries of origin: Norway; Denmark
- Original language: Norwegian
- No. of seasons: 3
- No. of episodes: 18

Production
- Executive producers: Adam Price; Meta Louise Foldager Sørensen
- Producer: Stine Meldgaard Madsen
- Production locations: Odda, Norway
- Production company: SAM Productions

Original release
- Network: Netflix
- Release: 31 January 2020 – 24 August 2023

Ragnarok is a Norwegian fantasy drama television series reimagining of Norse mythology from Netflix. It takes place in the present-day fictional Norwegian town of Edda in Hordaland, which is plagued by climate change and industrial pollution caused by factories owned by the local Jutul family. The Jutuls are actually four jötnar (supernatural beings, inexactly translated as "giants" in the English language overdub and closed captions) posing as a family. They are challenged by Magne, a teenage boy who is surprised to learn that he is the reincarnation of Thor, the Norse god of thunder. He begins to fight against those who are destroying the town after his friend dies under mysterious circumstances. In the second season, he is joined by more people who embody other Norse gods.

The series premiered in January 2020, with a second season released in May 2021. It is Netflix's third Norwegian-language TV series, following Home for Christmas and Lilyhammer. The series is produced by the Danish production company SAM Productions.

In November 2021, Herman Tømmeraas, who plays Fjor, confirmed that the series was returning for a third and final season. The third season was released on 24 August 2023.

== Cast and characters ==
=== Main ===
- David Stakston as Magne Seier, returns to Edda as a high school student. The reincarnation of Thor, god of thunder.
- Jonas Strand Gravli as Laurits Seier, Magne's younger half-brother, and Vidar's son. He is the reincarnation and reimaging of Loki, god of mischief.
- Herman Tømmeraas as Fjor, high-school-age "son" in the Jutul family of jötnar from Norse mythology.
- Theresa Frostad Eggesbø as Saxa, the high-school-aged "daughter" in the Jutul family.
- Emma Bones as Gry, Magne's and Fjor's love interest.
- Henriette Steenstrup as Turid Seier, Magne's and Laurits' mother, wife of Asbjorn.
- Synnøve Macody Lund as Ran, principal of the high school and "mother" in the Jutul family.
- Gísli Örn Garðarsson as Vidar, CEO of Jutul Industries, "father" in the Jutul family, and Laurits' biological father.

=== Supporting ===
- Odd-Magnus Williamson as Erik Eidsvoll, teacher at the high school, father of Magne's short-lived friend, Isolde, and later, step-father to both Magne and Laurits.
- Bjørn Sundquist as Wotan Wagner, elderly disabled aged care resident. The reincarnation of Odin, god of wisdom and king of the gods.
- Eli Anne Linnestad as Wenche, supermarket checkout operator. Her real identity is Völva. She awakens Magne's, Iman's and Wotan's powers.
- Tani Dibasey as Oscar Bjørnholt, high school student, hangs out with Fjor.
- Iselin Shumba Skjævesland as Yngvild Bjørnholt, local police chief, Oscar's mother.
- Danu Sunth as Iman Reza, new high school student. The reincarnation of Freyja, goddess of love, who can manipulate minds.
- Billie Barker as Signy Marie Kjærstad, Magne's new love interest.
- Benjamin Helstad as Harry Kristersen, mechanic, boxer. The reincarnation of Týr, god of war.
- Espen Sigurdsen as Halvor Lange, doctor at nursing home, "dark elf" or dwarven blacksmith.
- Fridtjov Såheim as Sindre, high school counselor.
- Vebjørn Enger as Jens, who Wotan later transforms into the reincarnation of Baldr, god of light.
- Ruben Rosbach as Kiwi, who Wotan later transforms into the reincarnation of Heimdall, god of foreknowledge.
- Ylva Bjørkaas Thedin as Isolde Eidsvoll

== Episodes ==
Series	Episodes	Originally released
1	6	31 January 2020
2	6	27 May 2021
3	6	24 August 2023

=== Season 1 (2020) ===
No. overall	No. in season	Title	Directed by	Written by	Original release date
1	1	"New Boy"	Mogens Hagedorn	Adam Price	31 January 2020
Magne, Laurits and Turid return to the Norwegian town of Edda. The boys' father had died in Edda under mysterious circumstances when they were children, and they moved away. As they drive into Edda, their car is slowed down behind Wotan in his mobility scooter, who comes to a halt trying to turn right. Magne gets out to help Wotan and he is approached by Wenche. She tells Magne he is a good boy, looks up at him intensely and blesses him by touching his forehead. A change flickers through his eyes. The brothers attend the local high school. Awkward Magne becomes friends with green advocate Isolde, who blames local pollution on the Jutul family. He and Isolde hike up to the glacier, which she has monitored. Vidar parks on the mountain. He strips, stalks a reindeer, tears out its heart and eats it. A text from Laurits sends Magne running swiftly down the mountain, but it turns out to be a false alarm. Magne watches, horrified, as Isolde paraglides into power lines and is killed. That night, a distraught Magne hurls his father's sledgehammer into a thunderstorm. It disappears into the clouds with a flash of lightning.
2	2	"541 Meters"	Mogens Hagedorn	Simen Alsvik	31 January 2020
Magne's hammer flies 1.5 kilometres, destroying Vidar's windshield. Turid recognizes it from news reports, blames Magne. Students mourn Isolde's death. Magne suspects it was no accident. Police report that Isolde was struck by lightning before hitting power lines. However, the lightning started an hour later. Wenche tells Turid: her son's heroic journey has started. Magne buys another sledgehammer and throws it 541 metres. Laurits scoffs when Magne brags of his hammer throws. Laurits wears his mother's stylish shirt to a school dance. Vidar and Ran discuss human flaws. Vidar admits he killed Isolde. He searches for her mobile: it has photos of Jutul Industries' illegal waste disposal. Strange things happen at the dance. Fjor puts on rock music in the Old Language, which affects the Jutuls. Ran is aroused, takes two schoolboys aside for sex. Fjor and Saxa dance strangely and are joined by Laurits. Laurits and Oscar watch Fjor urinate on Isolde's memorial. Oscar posts it on Instagram. Magne visits Erik; they share their grief. Vidar brutally beats Fjor as his urination was an insult to Vidar's work. Gry, who is staying overnight, sees Fjor's beating. The Seiers return from Isolde's funeral – their home was ransacked.
3	3	"Jutulheim"	Mogens Hagedorn	Marietta von Hausswolff von Baumgarten	31 January 2020
Seier brothers confront the junkie who stole Laurits' headphones. Junkie: house was ransacked before he got there; Vidar's car was at the scene. Magne tells Sindre of his frustration with the police and about suspicions of Vidar's involvement. Sindre tells Ran, who delivers the news to Vidar. Erik gives Isolde's computer to Magne. Fjor, Gry, Saxa and Laurits go driving. A bird hits the windshield. It is still alive, but Saxa eats it. When Magne confronts Bjornholt about inconsistencies surrounding Isolde's death; she challenges his own story. He traveled a distance, which takes 90 minutes in an hour. She tells him not to question some things. Later, Magne runs and times himself: 100 meters in 7 seconds. Vidar kills the junkie and sees a snowplow collide into Magne. He tells the other Jutuls that Magne is dead and informs them: not safe to have intimate relationships with humans. At school, Saxa is stunned to see Magne, unharmed. Magne and Laurits are invited to dine at Jutul's home, Jutulheim. Alcohol has no effect on Magne until they give him mead. Arm-wrestling Ran, he sees her true form and loses. Magnes reflection in the bathroom mirror shows a bearded, bloody warrior.
4	4	"Ginnungagap"	Jannik Johansen	Christian Gamst Miller-Harris	31 January 2020
Magne continues Isolde's work by investigating the Jutuls and their role in Edda's water pollution problems. He learns more about his own abilities while evading the increasingly suspicious Jutuls. Turid bonds with Erik; eventually they start a relationship. Both Magne and Fjor have a romantic interest in Gry. On a school camping trip into the mountains, Laurits tricks Magne into publicly confessing his love for Gry. She cares for Magne but does not love him, but instead chooses to go off with Fjor. After seeing Vidar cutting up raw reindeer meat, Magne realizes that it smells the same as the blood of Isolde's jacket at the time of her death. Magne deduces that Vidar was behind her death and warns Vidar that he will not get away with it. Vidar notices Magne's knife has the same marking as the hammer that destroyed his windshield. After Magne follows Fjor and Gry, Vidar sends Thrym, his hellhound, to kill Magne. Magne and Thrym struggle until Magne kills Thrym. When visiting the Jutul's home with Fjor, Gry notices something is wrong with the family: century-old photos and older artwork depict all the Jutuls as physically unchanged from the past into the present.
5	5	"Atomic Number 48"	Jannik Johansen	Christian Gamst Miller-Harris	31 January 2020
The Jutuls conspire to punish Magne because he killed Thrym, albeit in self-defense. When Magne proposes to write a critical assignment about Jutul Industries, he is confronted at a meeting attended by Ran, Sindre, Erik and Turid. He is forced to return Isolde's laptop to Erik. Nevertheless, Erik privately hands over Isolde's mobile to Magne, which Erik had found on the mountain. Magne unlocks it and finds incriminating photos of Jutul Industries' water pollution. He goes up the mountain and discovers 2,500 barrels in a newly exposed cave, which have leached toxic heavy metal wastes, including cadmium (element 48) into Edda's water supply. Magne reports the existence of the barrels to the police. However when police go to investigate, all the toxic barrels are gone. The police had felt obliged to pre-notified the Jutul Industries of their planned visit. Neither the police nor his high schools administration takes Magne's allegations seriously. Ran suspends Magne from school due to his disruptive behavior. Meanwhile he is ordered to attend psychological evaluation and treatment. Gry continues her relationship with Fjor even though she finds him odd, while his family increasingly puts pressure on him to break the relationship off.
6	6	"Yes, We Love This Country"	Jannik Johansen	Jacob Katz Hansen	31 January 2020
A Jutul-appointed psychiatrist misdiagnoses Magne with schizophrenia. He refuses to take antipsychotics. Turid criticizes Magne's anti-Jutul behavior. Fjor displays feelings for Gry and tries to help her family. He informs Magne that the toxic barrels from Jutul Industries are due to be shipped away. Jutuls order Fjor to kill Gry with Saxa threatening to do so, herself. Early on Constitution Day, Magne leaves toxic barrels at the police station. Police belatedly begin an investigation despite Vidar's attempts to intimidate Yngvild. Magne leaves Edda's local celebrations to follow Fjor and Gry to an abandoned warehouse. Fjor starts to attack Gry, but Magne saves her. Vidar arrives, identifies Magne as Thor and attacks. Before they battle, Magne warns Fjor and Gry to flee. Magne is almost overcome by Vidar but calls up lightning to direct a bolt at Vidar. Magne is hurt by the lightning, but survives. At the celebrations, Laurits dressed as Ran, gives a pretentious speech in front of the whole town, sarcastically pointing out how despite Norway being a democracy, no choice actually exists for common people while Jutuls exploit them. Due to their powerful position, Jutuls are least affected by climate change.

=== Season 2 (2021) ===
No. overall	No. in season	Title	Directed by	Written by	Original release date
7	1	"Brothers in Arms"	Mogens Hagedorn	Adam Price & Emilie Lebech Kaae	27 May 2021
Both Magne and Vidar survive their fight. Wenche watched, turned into an eagle and flew away. Wenche takes Magne to another reality where he learns he has to prepare for a battle, gather allies and create his weapon, Mjölnir. Jutuls conduct a war council, over Magne's growing powers. Fjor decides to leave Jutulheim and live with Gry. Magne informs Laurits that he is Thor reincarnated. Laurits asks if he is drugged. Magne explains that the Jutuls are jötnar, which have declared war against the gods and Magne. Laurits disbelieves Magne. Jutul Industries are queried regarding Edda's pollution. Saxa starts learning its businesses. New student, Iman joins Magne's fight against the Jutuls. The pair use her mental powers at Laurits' party. Laurits feels dumped because his love interest, Jens did not show. He confesses to Turid that he feels an outsider with no similarities to Asbjorn or Magne, and due to his sexuality. Turid confesses that she had an affair with Vidar, Laurits' biological father. Magne and Iman convince Harry to help make Mjölnir. On returning home, Magne finds Laurits and Vidar hugging. He cannot accept that Laurits is Vidars son. The Jutul patriarch had sworn to kill Magne.
8	2	"What Happened to the Nice, Old Lady?"	Mogens Hagedorn	Adam Price & Emilie Lebech Kaae	27 May 2021
Vidar takes Laurits on a motorcycle trip up the mountain and spends time bonding with him. He attempts to get Laurits to spy on Magne but Laurits immediately sees through the ploy and refuses. Vidar is not upset and continues to spend time with Laurits. When Magne tries to ban Laurits from visiting Vidar, they argue. Laurits accuses Magne of jealousy as Laurits now has a father, Vidar. Harry's mocked-up hammer does not return to his hand as Mjölnir should – it was improperly forged without ancient metal or a magical fire. Vidar invites Laurits to Jutulheim and proffers Old World mead. After drinking, Vidar performs a ritual to make Laurits one of the giants. Laurits stands in front of the bathroom mirror and sees himself as a dark-haired, shadowed figure with a tattoo, who blows him a kiss. Laurits realizes he is the embodiment of Loki and now believes what Magne had been saying. Laurits tells Magne that even if Vidar is his father, they are still brothers and informs him that Ran plans to kill Wenche as she was helping Magne. Magne rushes to Wenche but is too late to save her from Ran's Old World arrow.
9	3	"Power to the People"	Mogens Hagedorn	Adam Price & Emilie Lebech Kaae	27 May 2021
Before dying, Wenche leaves her magical necklace to Wotan, which summons Odin's spirit. Laurits manipulates Vidar into getting Jutulheim's key. Magne and Laurits sneak into Jutulheim's living room. They intend to use what they mistakenly think is an eternal flame to forge Mjölnir. Both are caught by Vidar and Laurits is labeled a traitor as they escape. Ran convinces Vidar to kill Laurits. Magne, Laurits, and Iman meet Wotan. Wotan does not allow Laurits to join: he is a giant and being traitorous is his nature. Angrily, Laurits steals Wotan's blood, injects himself to become half-god and half-giant. A protest against Jutul Industries includes local high school students. As Vidar's car is blocked, Laurits begs Vidar to let him rejoin, Vidar agrees. In Jutulheim, Vidar tells Laurits he is invulnerable to all weapons except for Old World ones. He takes an Old World axe intending to kill Laurits. Laurits who had begun to care for Vidar, freezes, in denial that his father would really try to kill him. Magne, who had followed Laurits, sees Vidar raising the axe, steps in and a fight ensues between the two, ending with Magne killing Vidar to save his own and Laurits' lives.
10	4	"God Is God, Though All Men Death Had Tasted"	Mogens Hagedorn	Adam Price & Emilie Lebech Kaae	27 May 2021
Magne feels guilty for killing Vidar and losing Laurits. Ran develops emotions but Saxa remains focused on her goals. Jutul Industries' regulations declare only an eldest son takes over. Saxa works to usurp the position. Fjor's feelings for Gry increase. Laurits refuses to acknowledge Vidar's killing attempt. Magne decides he cannot kill again, but Wotan declares that is impossible. Magne gives up the war. Laurits has an intestinal tapeworm. Gry tells Fjor: she will leave Edda. Fjor promises not to attend Vidar's funeral and join Gry. Iman fails to convince Magne to rejoin; Iman recruits Harry. Laurits has emergency surgery to remove his tapeworm, Jörmungandr. He takes it home. Laurits alters his appearance to match Vidar's. Saxa tries to change Fjor's mind and he grants Saxa total control over the Jutul Industries. She calls him a coward before leaving. On the day of the funeral, Magne, overwhelmed by his brother's new appearance, runs up to the mountains, wishing for normalcy. Arriving late to Vidar's funeral, Magne prays for removal of his powers, and they are lost. Fjor changes his mind about leaving Edda. He attends the funeral and decides to avenge Vidar. Gry leaves Edda while Fjor claims Vidar's Old World axe.
11	5	"Know Yourself"	Mads Kamp Thulstrup	Adam Price & Emilie Lebech Kaae	27 May 2021
Fjor takes over Jutul Industries, excluding Saxa. Neither Iman nor Harry acknowledge Magne anymore. Laurits returns to Jutulheim, where Ran demands his key. Ran confirms that Vidar had agreed to kill him. Turid finds Laurits keeping Jörmungandr, which she thinks is disgusting but allows him to continue. Magne tells Laurits he gave up his powers and they hug. Fjor fires Turid because she is Laurits' mother. Magne confronts Fjor but is knocked down easily. Magne asks Wotan to rejoin without killing anyone. After Fjor is back, Ran takes his side. Saxa decides to vote Fjor out with Laurits' help as a Jutul Industries member. Saxa offers the Jutulheim key and money. Ran drives Laurits home and warns him to stay out of her family. Laurits mocks Ran: even as a bastard, he was a relative of Vidar's, while the rest are not really family. Ran attacks Laurits, Magne tries to help but he is ineffectual. Magne decides to do whatever it takes to win the war and returns to Wotan to regain his powers. Wotan tells him that his greatest weapon is Mjölnir, his only chance against the Giants. Magne decides to lie to Laurits and get the Jutulheim key.
12	6	"All You Need Is Love"	Mads Kamp Thulstrup	Adam Price & Emilie Lebech Kaae	27 May 2021
Magne wants to impress Signy by hanging a banner at Jutul's warehouse and asks Laurits for Jutulheim's key. Wotan distracts guards but they inform Fjor. Inside the old warehouse, Iman keeps lookout while the rest locate an ancient forge. Iman and Harry fight Fjor; Harry loses part of his arm. Halvor crafts Mjölnir; Magne escapes. Iman and Halvor are fired. Magne tries throwing Mjölnir, but his powers do not return. Fjor announces their production relocating to Asia where governments are accommodating. Norwegian government realizes there would be massive job losses and intervenes to allow production. As storms appear Magne concludes that lightning created Thor. Laurits learns Magne lied. Magne awakens Mjölnir by holding it aloft until hit by lightning, and his powers return. At Jutulheim, Fjor and Ran find Saxa gave the key to Laurits and punish her. They leave to kill Laurits. Magne goes to Jutulheim to face Fjor, but finds an injured Saxa. They have intercourse. Fjor is about to kill Laurits when he claims he can kill Magne. As Fjor and Ran are about to leave, Magne appears in front and attacks them with Mjölnir, but they escape. Laurits releases Jörmungandr into the water; Ran and Fjor watch from the shore.

=== Season 3 (2023) ===
No. overall	No. in season	Title	Directed by	Written by	Original release date
13	1	"War Is Over"	Mogens Hagedorn	Adam Price & Emilie Lebech Kaae	24 August 2023
14	2	"Till Death Do Us Part"	Mogens Hagedorn	Adam Price & Emilie Lebech Kaae	24 August 2023
15	3	"Losing My Religion"	Mogens Hagedorn	Adam Price & Emilie Lebech Kaae	24 August 2023
16	4	"My Precious"	Mogens Hagedorn	Adam Price & Emilie Lebech Kaae	24 August 2023
17	5	"A Farewell to Arms"	Mogens Hagedorn	Adam Price & Emilie Lebech Kaae	24 August 2023
Before the final battle would begin Magne propose to lay down weapons. The boy which was accidentally hit by the arrow was shown playing with it.
18	6	"Ragnarok"	Mogens Hagedorn	Adam Price & Emilie Lebech Kaae	24 August 2023
After peace between Giants and Gods has been assured Saxa takes over the company. Magne passes his final exam. Laurits is moving out with Jens. During graduation Jens appears to be shot by Hod with the arrow, but nobody except for Magne seems to notice. This causes Ragnarok to start. In the fighting scenes that are overlaid with scenes from Magne’s comic of “Thor" the gods and giants slay each other one by one. The story is revealed to have been in Magne’s head, inspired by the comic and brought on by the tragic death of his father.

== Reception ==
On the review aggregator website Rotten Tomatoes, 70% of 10 critics' reviews are positive. The website's consensus reads: "Ragnarok might be too modest to match its apocalyptic mythology, but its intimate scale grounds Norse folklore in an approachable way that ought to appeal to young adult viewers."

Wired said Ragnarok was "angsty, eccentric" "climate change fiction" and compared it to Twilight. The A.V. Club also compared it to Twilight. The series was not well received by some Norwegian media. The newspaper Verdens Gang (VG) called it nonsensical, said that the characters, plots, and dialogue were a failure, and noted that even though it was filmed in Norway, using the Norwegian language, the series was a Danish production. Furthermore, VG noted that, despite being set in Western Norway, the characters do not speak in western dialect. The newspaper Dagbladet called it a stilted mixture of the teen drama series Skam and Norse mythology, "just as bad as it sounds".

IGN's K. Campbell praised season 1 as "compelling" and cited "the strength of its central concept, which depicts the end of the world as a slow creep...".

== See also ==
- Völuspá – Poem from the Poetic Edda
