= SAM Productions =

Danish television production company

SAM Productions ApS
- Company type: Anpartsselskab (ApS)
- Industry: Entertainment
- Founded: 2014; 12 years ago
- Founder: Søren Sveistrup; Adam Price; Meta Louise Foldager
- Headquarters: Copenhagen, Denmark
- Products: Television series
- Parent: StudioCanal (25%)
- Website: samproductions.dk

SAM Productions ApS is a Danish television production company founded by Søren Sveistrup, Adam Price, and Meta Louise Foldager. It is a subsidiary of StudioCanal.

== History ==
SAM Productions was founded in 2014 by Søren Sveistrup, Adam Price, and Meta Louise Foldager. StudioCanal holds a 25% stake in the company. In addition to its headquarters in Copenhagen, the company has also operated out of Stockholm since 2022.

== Filmography ==
Year	Title	Network	Ref.
2010–2022	Borgen	DR1	
2017	Something's Rockin'	TV 2 Charlie	
2017–2019	Below the Surface	Kanal 5	
2018–2020	Oda Upside Down	DR1	
2018–2020	Pros and Cons	TV3	
2020–2023	Ragnarok	Netflix	
2021–2026	The Chestnut Man	Netflix	
2022–present	The Orchestra	DR1	
2022–present	Elvira	Viaplay	
2023	The Nurse	Netflix	
TBA	Britta	TV 2	
TBA	By the Grace of God	TV 2	
TBA	Egeskov	TBA	
TBA	Murder in the Dark	Amazon Prime Video	
