= Borgen (TV series) =

Danish political drama television series by Adam Price

- Genre: Political drama
- Created by: Adam Price
- Written by: Adam Price; Jeppe Gjervig Gram; Tobias Lindholm
- Directed by: Søren Kragh-Jacobsen; Rumle Hammerich
- Starring: Sidse Babett Knudsen; Birgitte Hjort Sørensen; Pilou Asbæk; Søren Malling
- Composer: Halfdan E
- Country of origin: Denmark
- Original language: Danish
- No. of series: 4
- No. of episodes: 38 (list of episodes)

Production
- Producer: Camilla Hammerich
- Running time: 55–59 minutes
- Production companies: DR Drama (series 1–3); SAM Productions (series 4)

Original release
- Network: DR1
- Release: 26 September 2010 – 3 April 2022

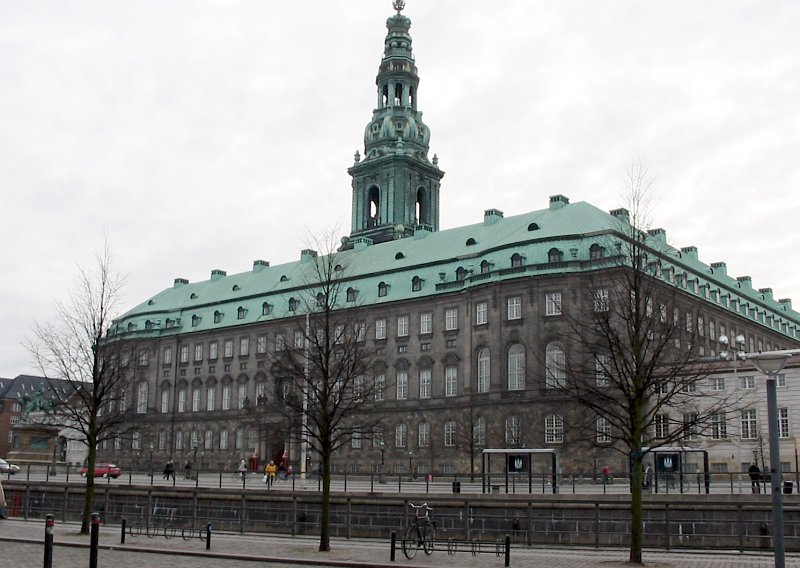
Christiansborg in 2004

Borgen (Danish pronunciation: [ˈpɒˀwn̩]) is a Danish political drama television series. Adam Price is the co-writer and developer of the series, together with Jeppe Gjervig Gram and Tobias Lindholm. The first three seasons were produced by the Danish public broadcaster DR, while season 4, Power & Glory, was produced by SAM Productions on behalf of DR, which previously produced The Killing. In Denmark, "Borgen" (lit. 'The Castle') is the informal name of Christiansborg Palace where all three branches of Danish government reside: the Parliament, the Prime Minister's Office, and the Supreme Court, and is often used as a stand in term for the Danish Parliament (Folketinget).

The programme tells how, against all the odds, Birgitte Nyborg Christensen (Sidse Babett Knudsen)—a minor centrist politician—becomes the first female prime minister of Denmark. Other main characters are Birgitte Hjort Sørensen as Katrine Fønsmark, a TV1 news anchor; Pilou Asbæk as Kasper Juul, a spin doctor; Søren Malling as Torben Friis, news editor for TV1; Mikael Birkkjær as Birgitte's husband, Phillip; and Benedikte Hansen as Hanne Holm, a journalist.

The first season of Borgen premiered in Denmark on 26 September 2010. Two more seasons, each also ten episodes long, followed in September 2011 and January 2013. Nine years later, in February 2022, the eight-episode fourth season (subtitled Power & Glory) was released in collaboration with Netflix.

== Birgitte Nyborg ==
Adam Price, the creator of the series, has stated, "I definitely want you to believe there is a shred of idealism in Birgitte Nyborg that is real. She's also become a very professional political being, but there is definitely that idealism, and that's important."

Sidse Babett Knudsen plays Nyborg. In describing her relationship with the character, she said, "They liked to see a woman feeling guilty and I didn't like that ... I think [Nyborg] should be responsible for her feelings. And when she has to make unsympathetic decisions, she should stand by them. I don't want her to feel sorry for herself or suddenly become a soppy mess in her private life, because you wouldn't believe her as a prime minister if she did that."

In the first episode, Birgitte is the leader of a minority political party, the "Moderates" (which corresponds with the Danish party of the Center-Left, as one of the Radical Parties of Western European nations, the Danish party known in English as the Danish Social Liberal Party and in Danish as "Radikale Venstre", or "Radikale B"). However, as a result of a sequence of events following a closely fought general election, she finds herself a compromise candidate for the role of prime minister and wins, juggling a variety of interests among her collaborators. She learns on the job and serves in this position until the end of the second series. In the first series, she is known as Birgitte Nyborg Christensen. She and her husband Philip Christensen separate, in part because of tensions arising from her job responsibilities and how it affects her family, including two children. The couple divorce at the end of the first episode of series two, and she uses the name Birgitte Nyborg.

In the elapsed time between the second and third series, Nyborg loses her position. She leaves the government and becomes a businesswoman and public speaker. She returns in the third series to form a new political party, the "New Democrats". The series ends with Nyborg taking up the position of the Danish foreign minister.

In the fourth season, titled Riget, Magten, og Æren (Power & Glory), Nyborg remains as foreign minister. She has to navigate the implication of oil being found in Greenland, which threatens to derail her party's green agenda, sparks an international crisis with the US, China, and Russia; and pushes the government to the brink of collapse.

The series ended with Nyborg having resigned as leader of the New Democrats and foreign minister. It also hints that Nyborg will become the next Danish Commissioner of the European Commission.

== Cast ==
Actor	Character	Role
Sidse Babett Knudsen	Birgitte Nyborg	Moderate party leader and prime minister (season 1 & 2); New Democrats party leader (season 3 & 4); Foreign Minister (season 3 & 4)
Nyborg-Christensen family
Mikael Birkkjær	Phillip Christensen	Birgitte Nyborg's husband – lecturer at Copenhagen Business School
Freja Riemann	Laura Christensen	Birgitte Nyborg-Christensen and Phillip Christensen's daughter
Emil Poulsen (season 1, 2 & 3); Lucas Lynggaard Tønnesen (season 4)	Magnus Christensen	Birgitte Nyborg-Christensen and Phillip Christensen's son
Birgitte Nyborg's staff
Pilou Asbæk	Kasper Juul	Communications chief for Birgitte Nyborg (season 1 & 2); Journalist (season 3)
Morten Kirkskov	Niels Erik Lund	Prime Minister's Office permanent secretary
Iben Dorner	Sanne	Prime Minister's Office personal assistant
Hanne Hedelund	Jytte	Prime Minister's Office secretary
Mikkel Boe Følsgaard	Asger Holm Kirkegaard	Deputy ambassador to the Arctic
Simon Bennebjerg	Oliver Hjorth	Ministry of Foreign Affairs personal assistant
Magnus Millang	Rasmus Gren Lundbæk	Ministry of Foreign Affairs permanent secretary
Channel TV1
Birgitte Hjort Sørensen	Katrine Fønsmark	TV1/Ekspres journalist (season 1 & 2); New Democrats Campaign Manager (season 3); TV1 Head of News (season 4)
Benedikte Hansen	Hanne Holm	Journalist on TV1 (season 1 & 3); Ekspres journalist (season 2)
Søren Malling	Torben Friis	TV1 news editor
Lisbeth Wulff	Pia Munk	TV1 editor
Thomas Levin	Ulrik Mørch	TV1 news anchor
Christian Tafdrup	Alexander 'Alex' Hjort	TV1 programme director
Anders Juul	Simon Bech	TV1 news anchor
Özlem Saglanmak	Narciza Aydin	TV1 news anchor
Nyborg's government
Lars Knutzon	Bent Sejrø	Finance minister (season 1), later Birgitte's advisor (seasons 2, 3 and 4)
Dar Salim	Amir Diwan	Green Party leader, Energy and Climate minister
Stine Stengade	Henriette Klitgaard	Business minister (Moderate Party)
Jens Jacob Tychsen	Jacob Kruse	EU Minister (Moderate Party), later EU Commissioner, later Moderate Party leader
New Democrats
Kristian Halken	Erik Hoffmann	Former vice-chairman of the New Right party
Julie Agnete Vang	Nete Buch	Former Moderate member of parliament
Jens Albinus	Jon Berthelsen	Former Moderate member of parliament Minister of Justice (season 4)
Laura Allen Müller	Nadia Barazani	New Democrats member of parliament Minister of Climate and Energy (season 4)
Lars Mikkelsen	Søren Ravn	New Democrats economics consultant
Labour Party
Peter Mygind	Michael Laugesen	Labour leader – Ekspres newspaper editor
Flemming Sørensen	Bjørn Marrot	Foreign minister, Labour leader (replacing Laugesen)
Lars Brygmann	Troels Höxenhaven	Justice minister and Labour deputy leader, later Foreign minister and Labour leader (replacing Marrot)
Bjarne Henriksen	Hans Christian Thorsen	Defence minister, later Foreign minister and Labour leader (replacing Höxenhaven)
Petrine Ager	Pernille Madsen	Equality minister, later Finance minister and Labour deputy leader
Johanne Louise Schmidt	Signe Kragh	Prime minister (season 4)
Party leaders
Søren Spanning	Lars Hesselboe	Liberal leader – Prime Minister (seasons 1 & 3)
Ole Thestrup	Svend Åge Saltum	Freedom leader
Marie Askehave	Benedikte Nedergaard	Freedom deputy leader
Jannie Faurschou	Yvonne Kjær	New Right leader
Signe Egholm Olsen	Anne Sophie Lindenkrone	Solidarity Party leader
Members of the Danish Parliament
Fadime Turan	Aicha Nagrawi	Solidarity
Claus Bue	Parly Petersen	Labour
Mette Kolding	Inger Hansen	Liberal
Greenlandic government
Angunnguaq Larsen	Jens Enok Berthelsen	Prime Minister for Greenland (seasons 1 & 2) / MP for Greenland (season 4)
Svend Hardenberg	Hans Eliassen	Resource minister
Nivi Pedersen	Emmy Rasmussen	Premier's office head of department
Other characters
Alastair Mackenzie	Jeremy Welsh	Birgitte Nyborg's boyfriend (season 3)
Claus Riis Østergaard	Ole Dahl	Communications chief for Lars Hesselboe (season 1)
Mille Dinesen	Cecilie Toft	Phillip Christensen's girlfriend – Paediatrician (season 2)

== Political parties and media ==
Parliament Seats, Series 1–2

Structure
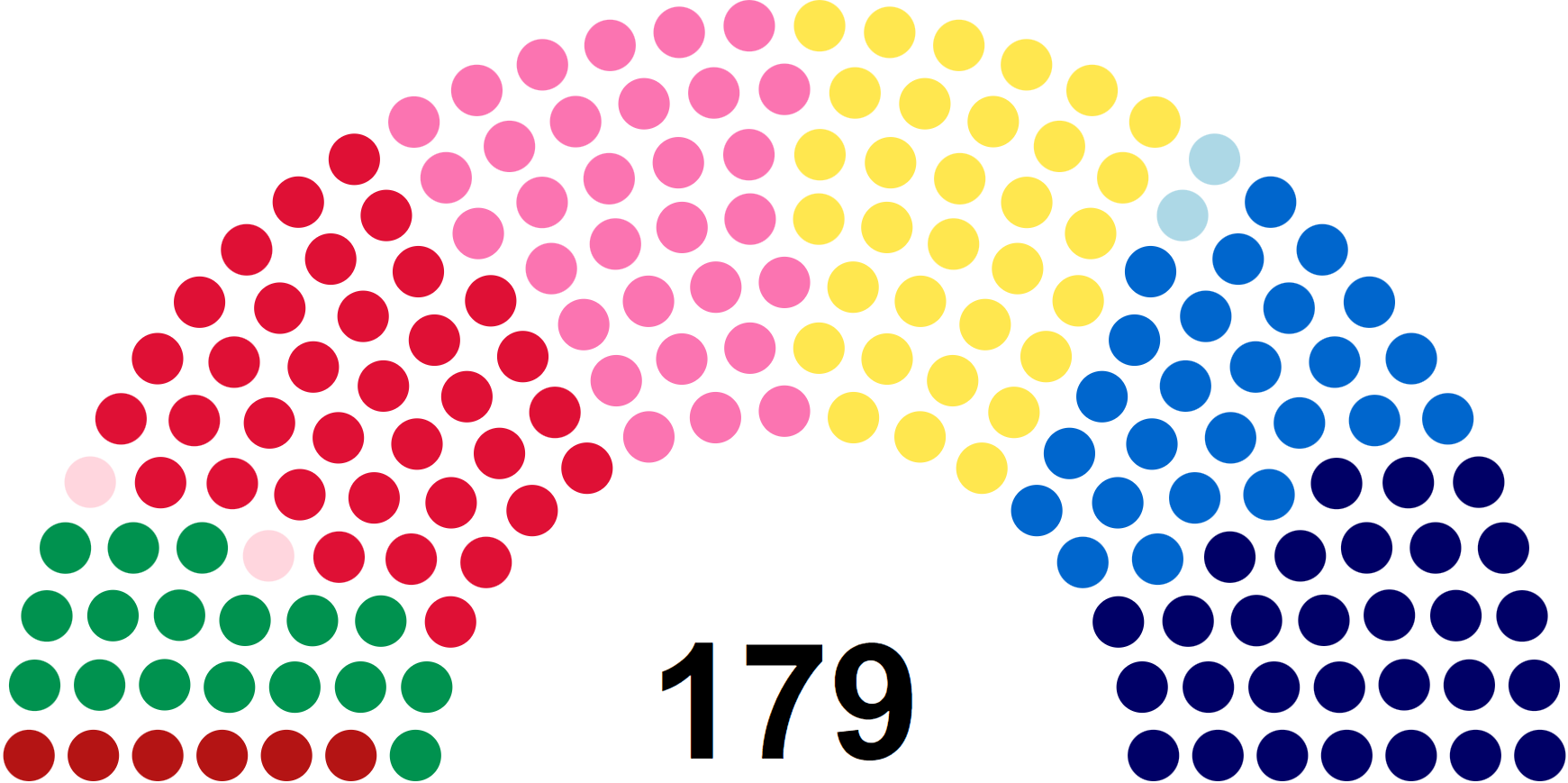
- Political groups: Government (83): Labour (35); Moderates (31); Greens (17); Supported by (8): Solidarity (6); Centre-left Greenland/Faroe Islands parties (2); Opposition (88): Liberals (32); Freedom Party (29); New Right (25); Centre-Right Greenland/Faroe Islands parties (2)

Parliament Seats, Season 3 Finale

Structure
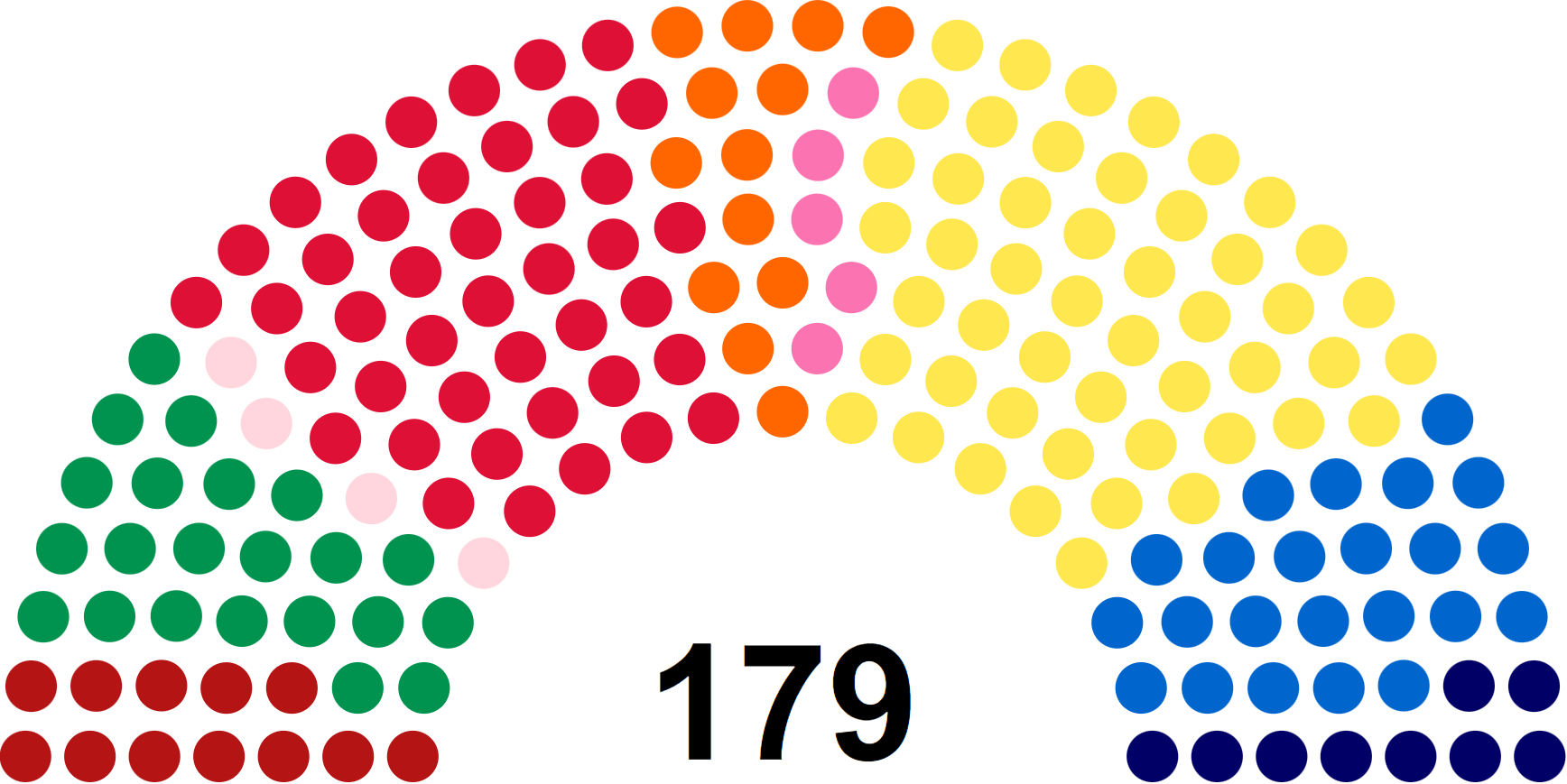
- Political groups: Government (85): Liberals (49); New Right (23); New Democrats (13); Supported by (5): Moderates (5); Opposition (89): Labour (42); Greens (22); Solidarity (12); Freedom Party (9); Greenland/Faroe Islands parties (4)

While the political parties in the series are fictional, they may be recognisable as their real-life equivalents.

- The Moderates (De Moderate), Birgitte Nyborg's centrist party in the first two series, is based on the Danish Social Liberal Party (Radikale Venstre)
- The centre-left Labour Party (Arbejderpartiet) is based on the Social Democrats (Socialdemokraterne)
- The left-wing environmentalist Green Party (Miljøpartiet) is similar to the Socialist People's Party (Socialistisk Folkeparti)
- The far-left Solidarity Collective (Solidarisk Samling) is similar to the Red-Green Alliance (Enhedslisten)
- The New Democrats (Nye Demokrater), Birgitte Nyborg's new centrist party in the third season is based on the New Alliance (Ny Alliance)
- The centre-right Liberal Party (De Liberale) is based on Venstre
- New Right (Ny Højre) is similar to the conservative Conservative People's Party (Konservative Folkeparti)
- The national-conservative Freedom Party (Frihedspartiet) is stated by party leader Svend Åge Saltum to be a successor party to Mogens Glistrup's Progress Party (Fremskridtspartiet), just like its real-life successor Danish People's Party (Dansk Folkeparti)

The fictional broadcasters and newspapers also have their real-life equivalents: the public broadcaster TV1 is based on DR1, the tabloid newspaper Ekspres is inspired by Ekstra Bladet, and the commercial 2'eren is similar to TV 2.

=== Election results ===
Season 1 starts with a general election that leads to a multi-party government that includes the Moderates, Labour and the Greens, supported by the Solidarity Collective. This continues into Season 2, with the Greens leaving government towards the end of that season.

Season 3 follows an election where the Liberals are back in power with the New Right, supported by the Freedom Party and the Moderates. The finale includes a snap election that ends with the Liberals forming a centre ground coalition with the New Right and the New Democrats, supported by the Moderates, with no involvement from the Freedom Party.

Season 4 begins with the Labour Party (the largest party) and the New Democrats (with 14 seats) in coalition, supported by the Greens, Solidarity and Greenlandic representatives. The government only has a majority of one based on this support. It is stated that the opposition includes the Liberals with 42 seats, the Freedom Party with 27 seats and the New Right with 18 seats.

Parliament Seats, Season 4 (Power&Glory)

Structure
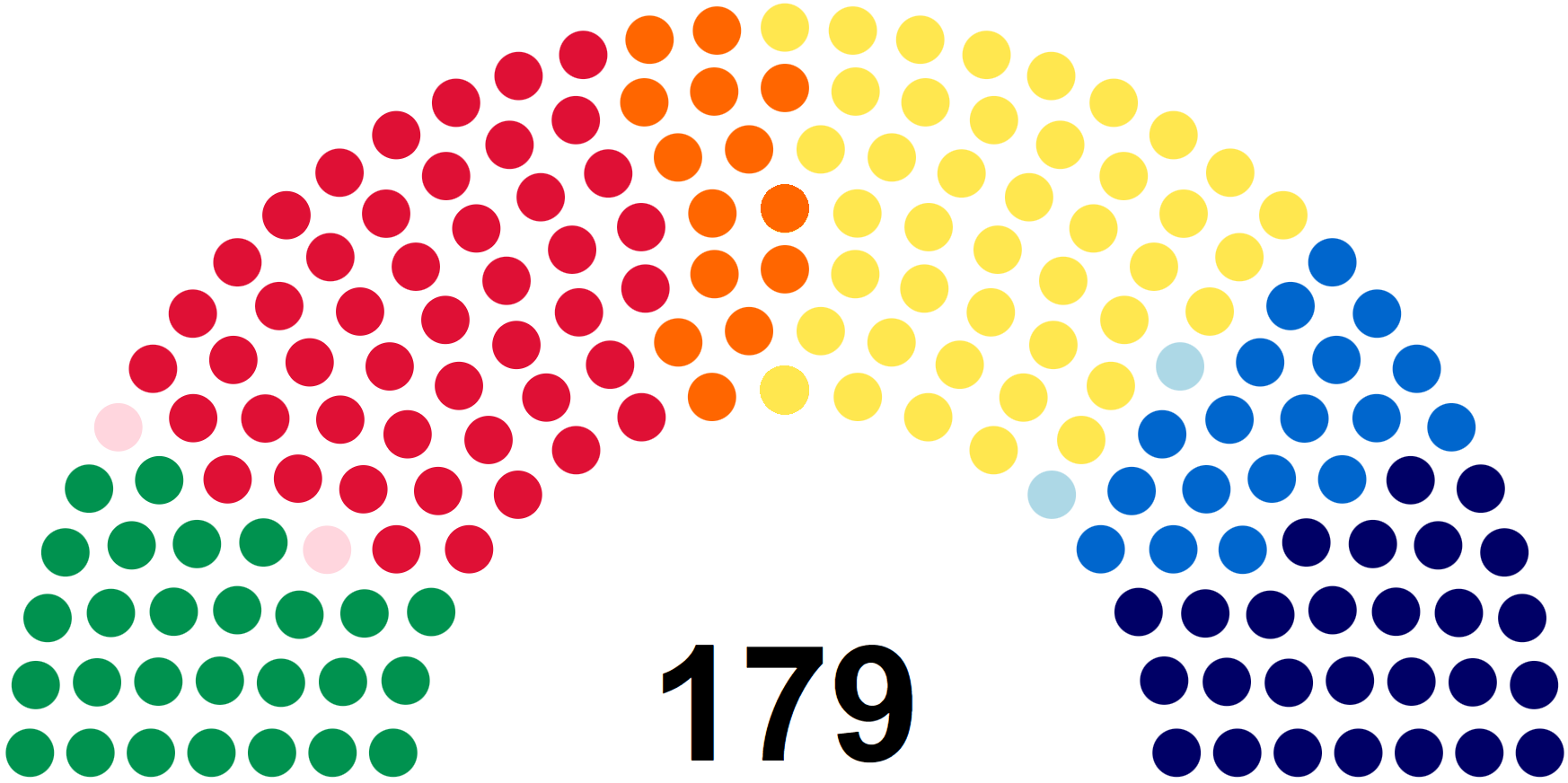
- Political groups: Government (61): Labour (47); New Democrats (14); Supported by (29): Greens and Solidarity (27); Centre-Left Greenland/Faroe Islands parties (2); Opposition (89): Liberals (42); New Right (18); Freedom Party (27); Centre-Right Greenland/Faroe Islands parties (2)

== Episodes ==
Series	Episodes	Originally released	
Series	Episodes	First released	Last released
1	10	26 September 2010	28 November 2010
2	10	25 September 2011	27 November 2011
3	10	1 January 2013	10 March 2013
4	8	13 February 2022	3 April 2022

== Reception ==
The series has been well received by critics and audiences alike. It became a hit in Denmark as well as Australia, the UK and the US (via Netflix), becoming one of several Danish series to do so in recent years. Maggie Brown of The Guardian cited the strong female characters, originality and an ability to "uncannily forecast actual developments in Danish politics" as reasons for its success. Jane Merrick of The Independent published a list of similarities from Series 2 to actual events in present-day UK politics following the conclusion of the series in the UK.

US critics have been similarly positive, with Newsweek dubbing Borgen "the best TV show you have never seen" and bestselling novelist and Entertainment Weekly columnist Stephen King put the series on the top of his top 10 list of the best TV shows of 2012. The New York Times also offered praise, describing Borgen as a "bleaker, Nordic version of The West Wing" and saying it "finds a remarkable amount of drama and suspense in center-left alliances, pension plans, and televised debates."

With several middle of the road 3/6 star ratings, the Danish media's reaction to the third series was noticeably less positive than for the first two series. Politiken commented that the third series "ended like a soap opera" and "never succeeded in breaking free from predictability"; with Berlingske's review declaring that while the third series "tied up the loose ends in pretty bows and was, like the rest of the series, well performed, it was also insidiously dull". Tabloid paper BT however claimed that the series "finished on a peak" and with this third season had "become the best Danish series in years". The critique came after several months where storylines from the third series in an unprecedented manner for a Danish drama series had sparked media headlines and created hefty debates in real life Danish politics on, among other issues, prostitution and pig farming, epitomised by Danish MP Mai Henriksen from Conservative People's Party, who was widely accused by colleagues and journalists of advocating a bill of rights for prostitutes, solely because she was inspired by Borgen.

For the fourth season, the review aggregator website Rotten Tomatoes reported an approval rating of 95% based on 19 reviews, with an average rating of 9.5/10. The website's critics consensus reads, "Borgen returns after an extended hiatus with its emotional heft and political intelligence wholly intact, reasserting itself as the best kind of brainy escapism."

== Awards ==
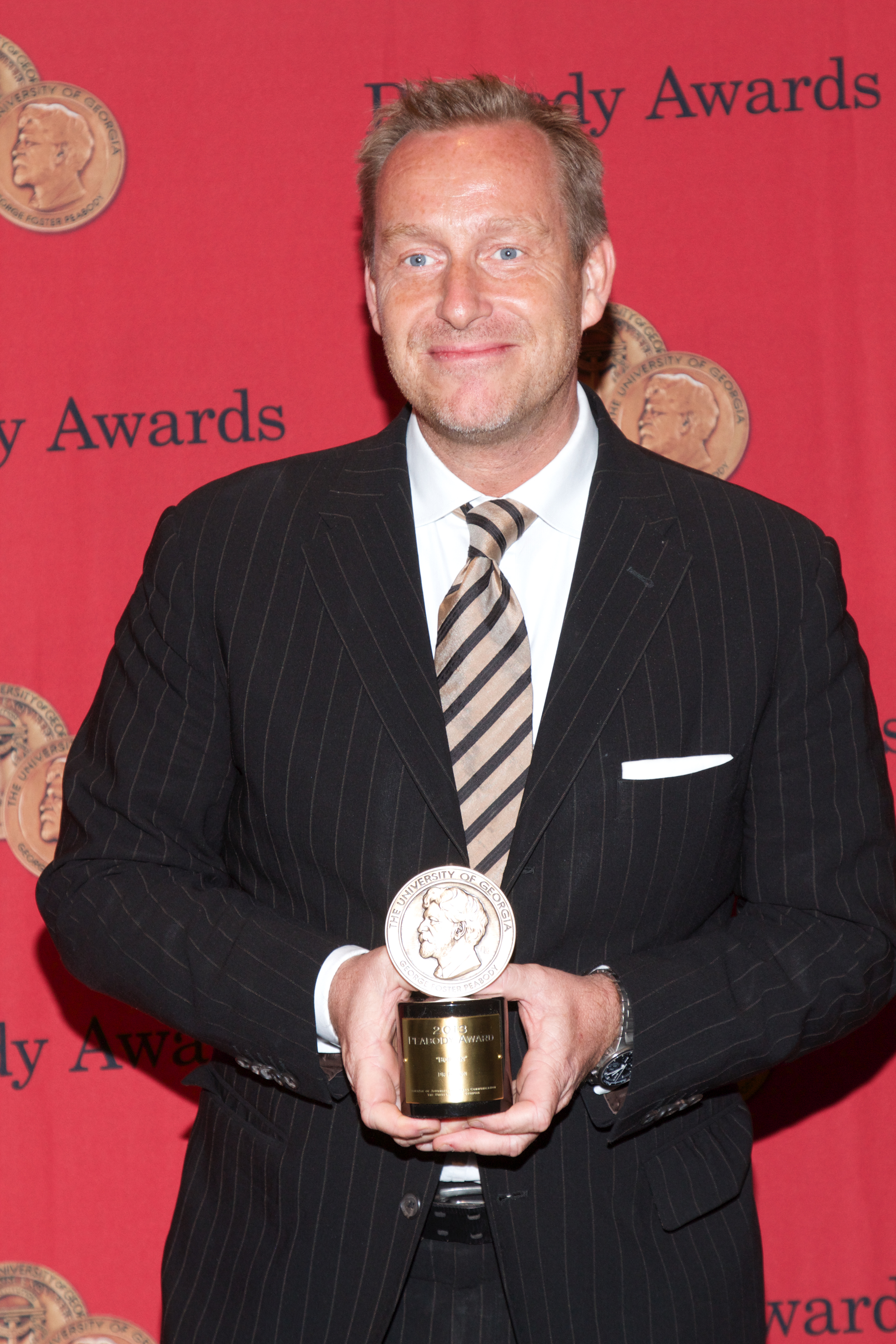
Adam Price with the Peabody Award for Borgen at the 73rd Annual Peabody Awards

Award Show	Year	Category	Nominee(s)	Result
International Emmy Award	2012	Best Performance by an Actress	Sidse Babett Knudsen	Nominated
Monte Carlo TV Festival	2011	Outstanding Actress in a Drama Series	Sidse Babett Knudsen	Won
Monte Carlo TV Festival	2013	Best International Drama TV Series	Borgen III	Nominated
Monte Carlo TV Festival	2013	Best European Drama TV Series	Borgen III	Won
Monte Carlo TV Festival	2013	Outstanding Actress in a Drama Series	Birgitte Hjort Sørensen	Nominated
British Academy Television Awards	2012	International Prize	Borgen	Won
British Academy Television Awards	2014	International Prize	Borgen	Nominated
Prix Italia	2010	Best TV Drama – Series and Serials	Borgen	Won
Festival International de Programmes Audiovisuels	2011	Best TV Series and Serials	Borgen	Won
Festival International de Programmes Audiovisuels	2011	TV series and Serials: Best Music	Halfdan E	Won
Peabody Award	2013	Area of Excellence	Borgen	Won
Critics' Choice Awards	2023	Best Foreign Language Series	Borgen	Nominated

Borgen won the award for Best International TV series at the 2012 British Academy Television Awards. Awards for the series include the 2010 Prix Italia for best drama series, a Golden Nymph to Sidse Babett Knudsen for Outstanding Actress in a drama series at the 2011 Monte-Carlo Television Festival, and the Fipa Grand Prize for Best TV Series as well as for Best Original Soundtrack at the 2011 Festival International de Programmes Audiovisuels.

== Radio ==
DR1 produced a spinoff radio serial, Udenfor Borgen ("Outside the Castle"), to accompany the release of the television show. The main character is Hans Gammelgard (voiced by Danish actor Finn Nielsen), private secretary in the Ministry of the Environment, who faces unexpected adversity after he tries to push for a controlled approach to the cultivation of genetically modified crops by Danish farmers.

Beginning in December 2013, BBC Radio 4 aired an English-language translation of the Danish radio serial, entitled Borgen: Outside the Castle, starring Tim Pigott-Smith as Hans Gammelgard. Reviewer Fiona Sturges of The Independent thought the radio version was "wholly pointless", and noted in particular that, unlike the television series, the radio program was "relegating its female characters to the fringes, casting them as secretaries and anxious mothers." On the other hand, Gillian Reynolds of The Telegraph gave the radio show a positive review, approving its complex treatment of the intricacies of the civil service. In 2015 Deutschlandfunk broadcast this radio serial with German explanations for some of the wordplays such as MOM=MON for Momentum=Monsanto.

== Remake ==
In September 2011, it was announced that NBC would produce a US remake of Borgen, with a pilot being developed by David Hudgins and Jason Katims of Friday Night Lights fame. The NBC remake never materialized, but in November 2013 it was confirmed by Adam Price that HBO and BBC Worldwide were set to begin production on a U.S. remake of the series.

== Merchandise ==
=== DVD ===
The first three series have been made available in Denmark and the UK on DVD. Both are coded Region 2 format and consist of the complete episodes as screened on DR1 and BBC4.

In the US, MHz Networks released all three series and the complete series box set on DVD coded Region 1.

DVD Name	Episodes	DVD release dates		
DVD Name	Episodes	Region 2 (Denmark)	Region 2 (UK)	Region 1 (US)
The Complete First Series	10	3 February 2012	6 February 2012	12 March 2013
The Complete Second Series	10	30 May 2012	4 February 2013	25 June 2013
The Complete First and Second Series	20	3 April 2013	4 February 2013	–
The Complete Third Series	10	14 November 2013	16 December 2013	21 January 2014
The Complete Series	30	–	16 December 2013	21 October 2014

=== Book ===
A novelisation of the first series of Borgen was released in Denmark, The Netherlands, and France on 19 February 2013. The Danish release from DR in conjunction with publisher Lindhardt & Ringhof is written by Jesper Malmose. Head of DR Sales Anders Kjærsgaard Sørensen hopes to have the book available in the UK soon.

=== Music ===
On 26 February 2013, DR Salg, the commercial distribution arm of DR, made Borgen (Original TV Series Soundtrack), nineteen tracks of Halfdan E's original compositions for the show, available for digital download on iTunes.

Based on the music from the show and entitled 'Borgen 2010', Halfdan E has also made a longer composition available through SoundCloud.
