= Herman Tømmeraas =

Norwegian actor

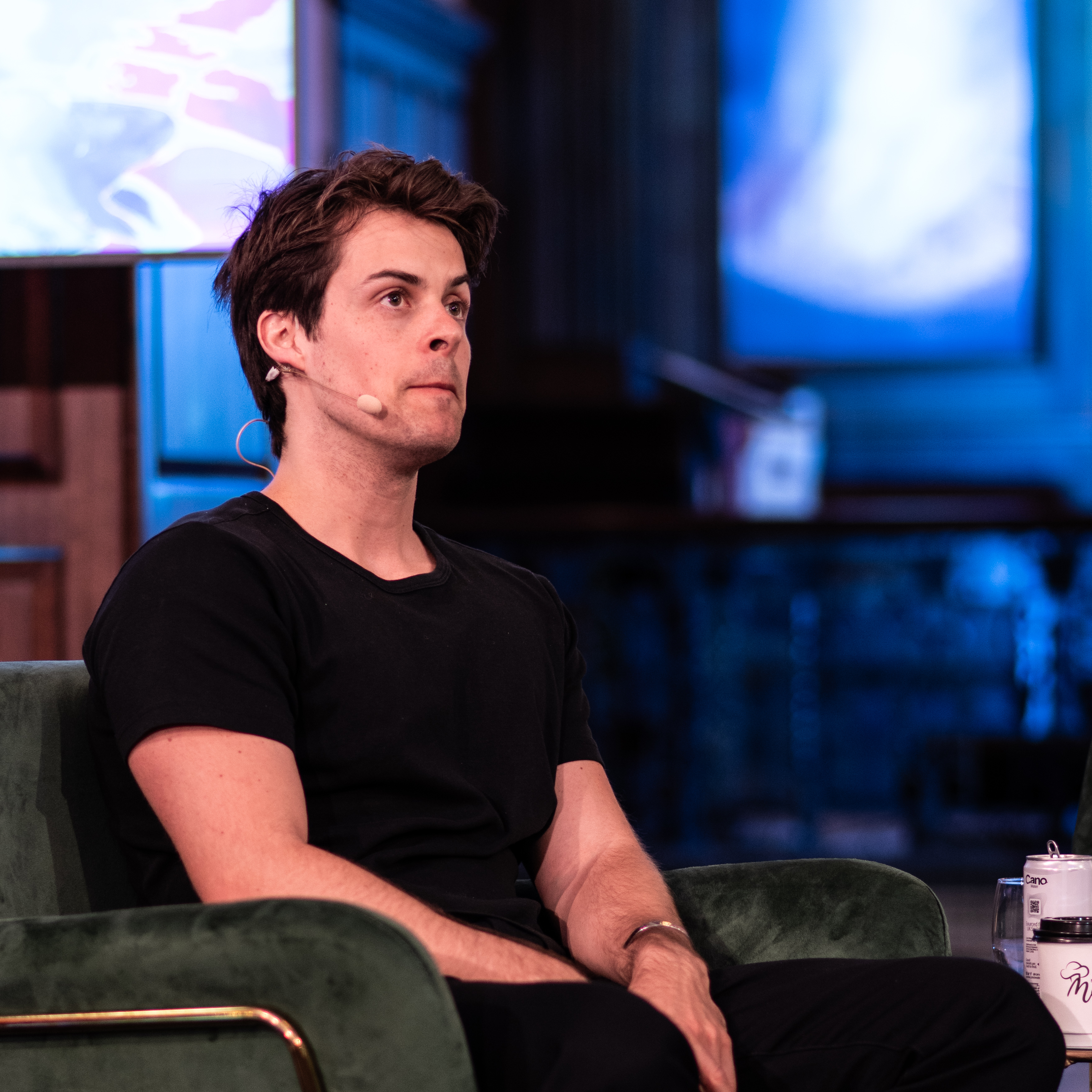
- Tømmeraas at SXSW London 2025
- Born: 2 April 1997 (age 29); Solbergelva, Norway
- Occupation: Actor
- Years active: 2011–present

Herman Tømmeraas (born 2 April 1997) is a Norwegian actor and dancer. He is best known for his role as Christoffer Schistad in the television teen drama series Skam (2015–2017).

== Early life ==
Tømmeraas was born in Solbergelva, a suburb in the city of Drammen. He grew up with his parents, Bjorn Olav and Runi Tømmeraas, in the town of Drammen. He has a younger brother, Teodor. He attended Killingrud Ungdomsskole. In 2017, Tømmeraas started serving Norway's compulsory military service for a year, finishing at the age of 20.

== Career ==
Tømmeraas began his acting career at the age of eleven in the short film Arkitektene in 2008. When he turned 13, he appeared in Stikk as part of a Norwegian TV production. Tømmeraas also danced with his group, We are 1

He almost gave up on acting as he had no roles till the age of 18, when he landed the role of Christoffer Schistad in the Norwegian teen drama web series Skam. He saw an ad and auditioned for the role of William but ended up with Chris's role, for which he is now best known for worldwide.

In 2017, Tømmeraas also starred and co-produced Semester, the first Scandinavian drama on Snapchat Shows, with Ulrik Imtiaz Rolfsen. He also starred in a music video with Astrid S for the song "Such a Boy". He voiced the character of Walter Beckett in the Norwegian-dubbed version of the American animated series Spies in Disguise (his character was voiced over by Tom Holland in the English version) in 2018. He also voiced the baby in Yngvild Sve Flikke's comedy Ninjababy.

Tømmeraas starred as the giant Fjor in Netflix's Ragnarok (2020-2023).

== Personal life ==
Tømmeraas dated football player Amalie Snøløs in 2018. As of 2023, he is in a relationship with Swedish actress Alicia Agneson.

== Filmography ==
=== Film ===
Year	Title	Role	Notes
2022	Leave	Stian Norheim	
2022	Nightmare	Robbie/Demon	
2021	Ninjababy	Ninjababy	Narration
2008	Arkitektene	Kristian	Short Film
2025	Sweetness	Payton Adler	

=== Television ===
Year	Title	Role	Notes
2011	Stikk	Himself	6 episodes
2015-2017	Skam	Christoffer Schistad	22 episodes
2018	Null	Erling	
2018-2019	Semester	Erling	10 episodes
2020–2023	Ragnarok	Fjor	18 episodes
