= David Stakston =

Norwegian-American actor

- Born: David Alexander Sjøholt; November 22, 1999 (age 25); Raleigh, North Carolina, U.S.
- Occupation: Actor
- Years active: 2015–present
- Height: 186 cm (6 ft 1 in)

David Stakston (born David Alexander Sjøholt; November 22, 1999) is a Norwegian-American actor. He is best known for his role as Magnus Fossbakken in the Norwegian teen drama Skam, and as Magne Seier in the Netflix fantasy drama series Ragnarok.

== Biography ==
Stakston was born on November 22, 1999, in Raleigh, North Carolina, and grew up in both Florida and Oslo, Norway.

In 2015, Stakston starred as one of the main characters in the Norwegian drama web series Skam, which became very popular in Nordic countries. In the following years he made a few shorter appearances on Norwegian television. Since 2020, he has played Magne Seier, the main character of the Norwegian Netflix fantasy drama series Ragnarok.

== Filmography ==
=== Film ===
Year	Title	Role	Notes
2018	Vill Ni Åka Mera	Jonas	Short film

=== Television ===
Year	Title	Role	Notes
2015–2017	Skam	Magnus Fossbakken	Main role (season 3); guest (seasons 1–2); recurring (season 4)
2020–2023	Ragnarok	Magne Seier / Thor	Main role
