= Jeppe Gjervig Gram =

Danish screenwriter (born 1976)

Jeppe Gjervig Gram (born 1976) is a Danish screenwriter.

He is one of the three screenwriters of the Danish political TV drama Borgen, co-creating and writing the series with the showrunner Adam Price and Tobias Lindholm. He has written 14 of the show's 30 episodes and is credited with storyline contributions to the rest.

In 2012 Gram received the award for best international series at the BAFTA, together with Adam Price, the show's director Søren Kragh-Jacobsen, and Borgen lead Sidse Babett Knudsen. The show was nominated for a BAFTA again in 2014, and the same year Gram, alongside Price, Lindholm, Kragh-Jacobsen and series producer Camilla Hammerich, was awarded a Peabody for his work on Borgen.
