= Sweetness (film) =

2025 thriller film

- Theatrical release poster
- Directed by: Emma Higgins
- Written by: Emma Higgins
- Produced by: Taj Critchlow; Daniel Quinn
- Starring: Kate Hallett; Herman Tømmeraas; Aya Furukawa; Justin Chatwin; Steven Ogg; Amanda Brugel
- Cinematography: Mat Barkley
- Edited by: Kat Webber
- Music by: Blitz//Berlin
- Production companies: Fela; When We Were Kids
- Distributed by: Elevation Pictures
- Release date: March 7, 2025 (SXSW)
- Running time: 93 minutes
- Country: Canada
- Language: English

Sweetness is a 2025 Canadian thriller film written and directed by Emma Higgins. The film stars Kate Hallett as Rylee Hill, a teenager who meets rock star Payton Adler (Herman Tømmeraas), and becomes obsessed with saving him from his demons when she realizes that he's a dysfunctional drug addict rather than a role model.

The cast also includes Justin Chatwin, Steven Ogg, Amanda Brugel, Erika Swayze, Aya Furukawa, Julius Cho, Kelly Reich, Kelsey Ruhl, Maureen Cassidy, Jude Zappala, Andrea Senior, Carter Belanger, Matt Lishman, Joan Bartley and Josh Reich in supporting roles.

It premiered at the 2025 South by Southwest Film & TV Festival on March 7. Saban Films acquired United States rights to the film with plans to release February 13, 2026.

== Plot ==
Rylee, an angsty, bullied teenage girl, obsessed with a rockstar, Payton Adler, whose music she deeply relies on. She has a disinterested cop dad who is often away, and she doesn't get along with his girlfriend. Rylee goes to a concert of Payton's band, Floorplan, with her only close friend, Sidney. Sidney (Sid) leaves early to meet with a boy she's seeing, Chris, while Rylee stays to try and meet Payton. Rylee is abandoned at the venue when Sid doesn't come back to pick her up.

Payton is an addict and reliant on drugs to function. His tour manager doesn't allow him access. Payton leaves after the show frantically to buy drugs and accidentally hits Rylee with his car, when she was in the parking lot drinking. Rylee isn't seriously injured, and Payton offers her a ride to avoid attention and hide his 'almost crime'.

During the ride, Payton is texting while driving, and makes a quick stop to buy and take drugs, while Rylee earnestly talks about being a fan of him. High and losing control, he runs a red light, and almost crashes, stopping a few blocks away from Rylee's empty house. Her guardians are away. She helps him inside, and gives him water. Her friend Sid comes back and is shocked to see Payton in Rylee's house. Payton is freaking out, drops pills in front of them, and locks himself in the bathroom, angry. Sid and Rylee help him and get him into bed. Rylee deliberates and gets the handcuffs, securing him to the bedpost since he was out of control.

In the morning, Rylee wants to keep Payton there to detox, but Sid disagrees. Rylee believes this is her purpose, the reason they met, to help Payton recover from addiction. Rylee convinces Sid to hold him for a few days. Payton's manager searches for him, though not believing anything serious happened due to Payton having relapses and disappearing often. Payton hits Sid and escapes when Sid and Rylee were trying to move him into the vacationing neighbours' empty house, despite Rylee having a gun. He runs through the neighbourhood, trying to get help, Rylee confronts him and they fight. Payton almost hits her with a plank, Sid arrives in time and hits him with a car.

They get him into the neighbours' house and restrain him. Sid is fed up and tries to leave, Rylee accidentally kills her while shushing her screams from a passer-by. Rylee frames Chris for the murder. Rylee has a heartfelt conversation about her mother's death and Floorplan's music saving her life with Payton, after he has a breakdown. Marnie, Rylee's dad's girlfriend finds Payton, he begs for help, but Rylee kills her with a bat. Rylee comforts Payton after the killing. She tells him she loves him, and gives him her mom's necklace. Payton pretends to reciprocate, showing her lyrics he wrote, then escapes. He drives away then it cuts to Rylee at breakfast. Rylee's dad is called away to duty to check a murder scene, where Payton is dead, and Marnie's dead body is in the car. Rylee's dad finds the necklace around Payton's neck and hides it. A year later, Rylee got away with it, and online they say Payton died of an overdose, his prints connect him to the murder of a victim, and his band made a song from his lyrics, winning an award, a posthumous Grammy.

== Cast ==
- Kate Hallett as Rylee
- Herman Tømmeraas as Payton
- Aya Furukawa as Sidney
- Justin Chatwin as Ron
- Steven Ogg as John
- Amanda Brugel as Marnie

== Production ==
In March 2024, it was announced that Canadian–American production company Fela stepped in to finance the project written and directed by Emma Higgins in her feature directorial debut. The film also received an additional $500,000 funding from the Ontario government through the Northern Ontario Heritage Fund.

The film was shot on location in North Bay, Ontario, from April 15 to May 8, 2024.

== Reception ==
On the review aggregator website Rotten Tomatoes, 89% of 35 critics' reviews are positive.

The film was a nominee for the DGC Award for Best Direction in a Feature Film at the Directors Guild of Canada awards in 2026.
