= James Price (composer) =

Danish composer and conductor

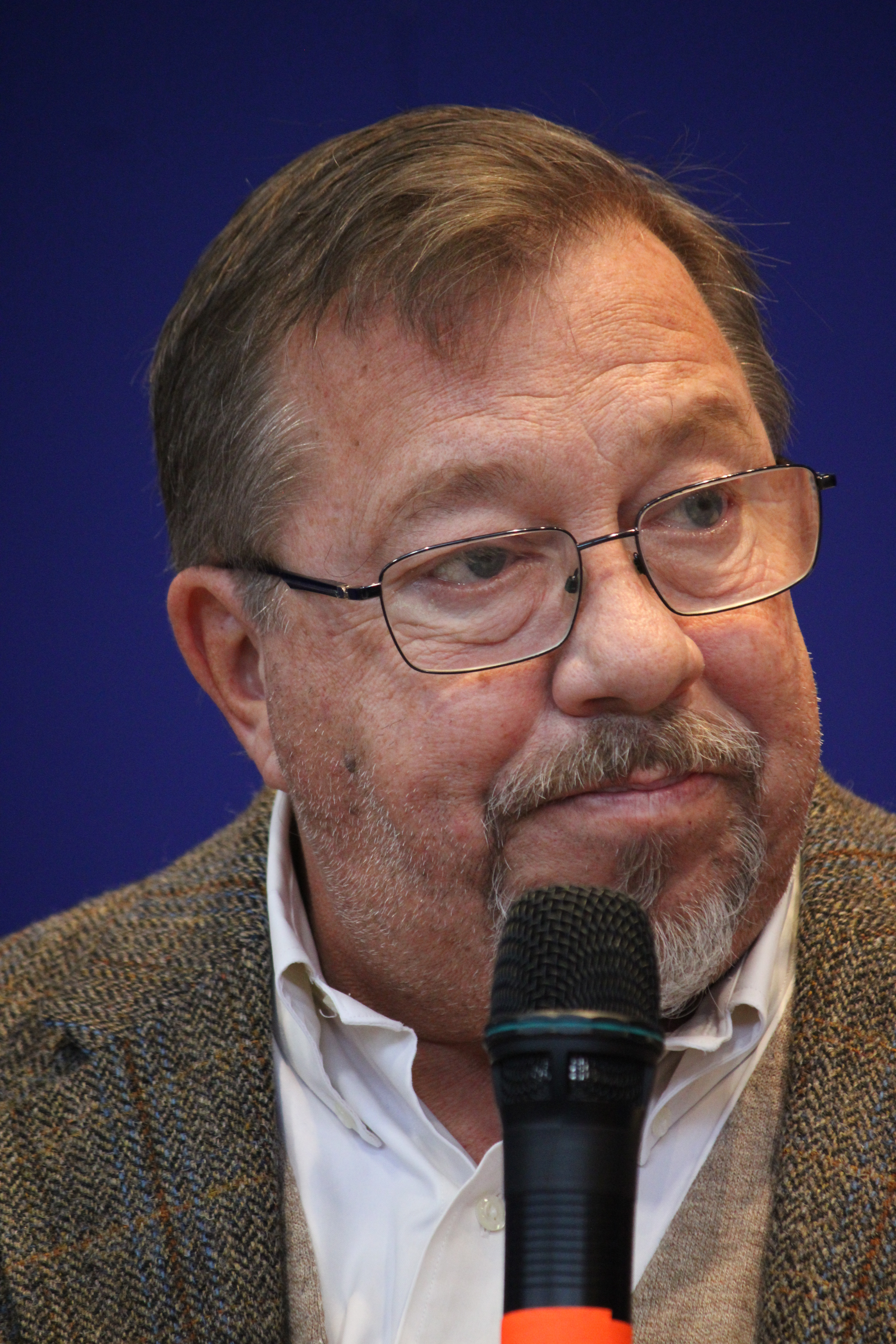
James Price in 2025 in Copenhagen

James Price (born November 20, 1959, in Copenhagen) is a Danish composer and conductor, as well as a celebrity TV chef, known especially for appearing along with his brother Adam Price on the Danish cooking show Spise med Price (Eating with the Prices). In terms of musical work, he is best known for having served as the conductor on the Danish revue, Cirkusrevyen from 1984 to 2021.

In 2020, Price began a YouTube channel for cooking videos called James' køkken "James' kitchen".

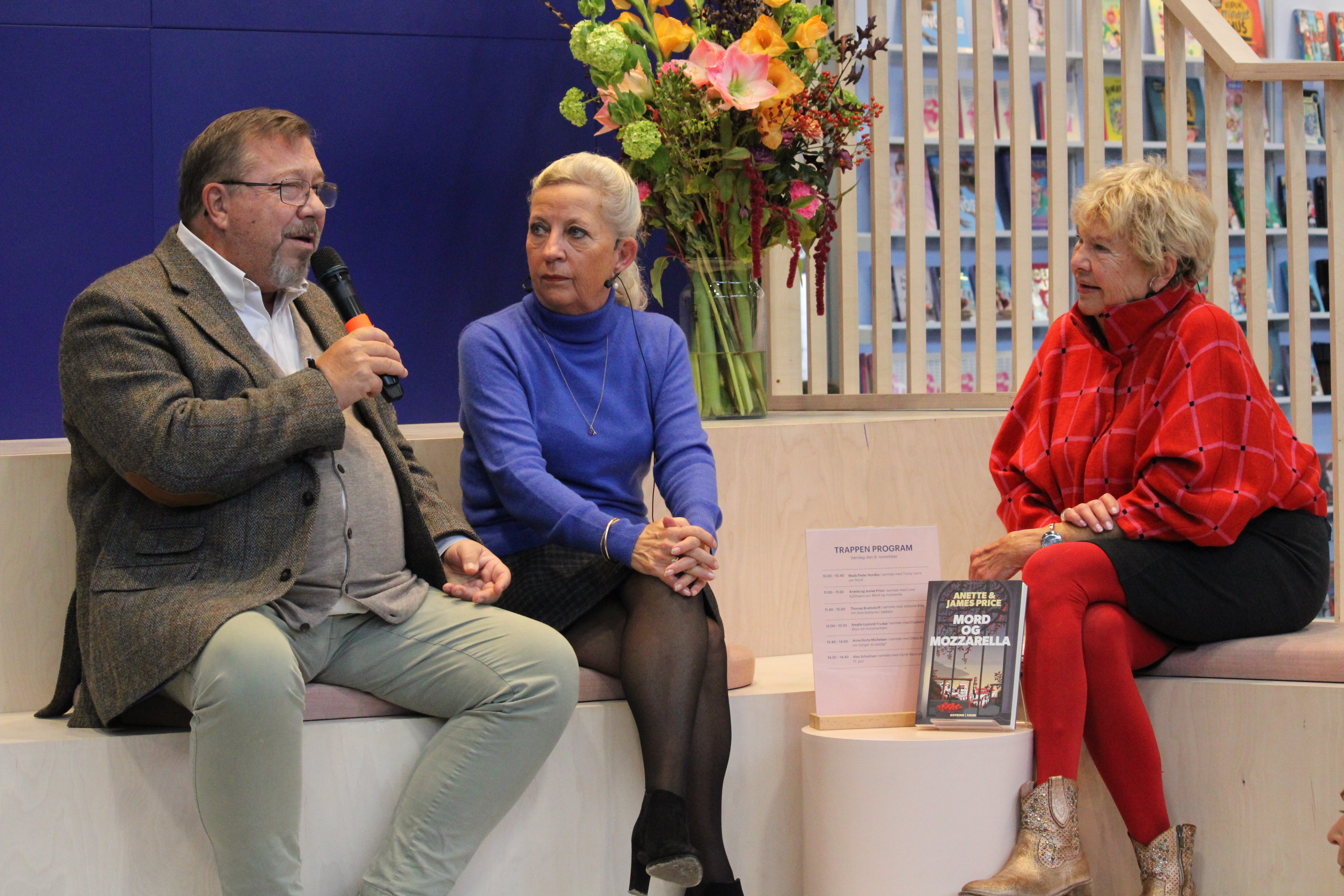
Price and his wife Anette Price being interviewed by Lone Kühlmann at Bogforum 2025

== See also ==
- List of Danish composers
