= Halfdan E =

Danish film composer (born 1965)

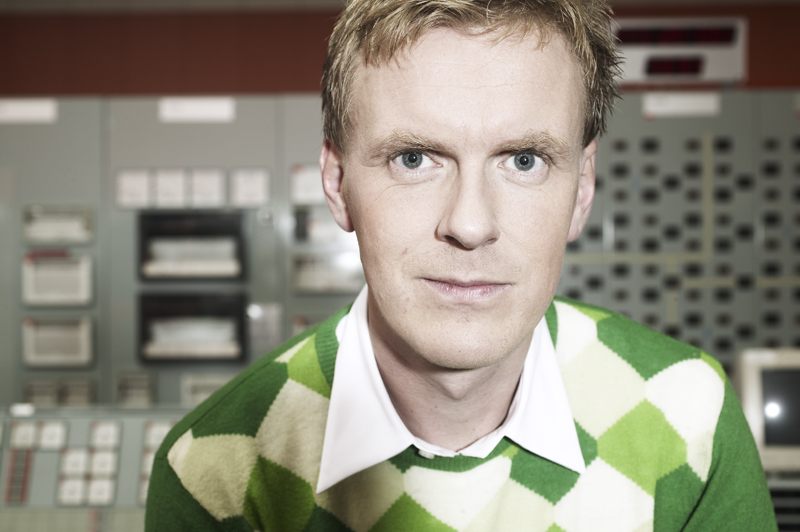
Halfdan E.

Halfdan E (Halfdan E Nielsen, born November 21, 1965) is a Danish film composer. His work has won two Danish Grammy Awards and three Danish Robert Awards. His music for the television series Borgen has also won the 2011 FIPA prize.

== Biography ==
Halfdan E was born in Copenhagen, Denmark. After stints as a session bass player in many different rock bands in the 1980s and early 1990s, followed by a degree from the Academy of Music in Copenhagen, Halfdan E collaborated with Danish poet Dan Turèll on the crossover project "Pas På Pengene", resulting in two CD recordings, which both won Danish Grammy awards. He continued to compose for film and television, working with film directors such as Per Fly and Hans Petter Moland, and to work as a pop and rock producer. He wrote the score for Per Fly's TV-series Forestillinger.

Halfdan E has been awarded three Danish Robert Awards out of five nominations. In 2012, he composed a new four-tone notification sound for the Banedanmark Danish state railway, replacing the three-tone sound composed by Niels Viggo Bentzon and used since the early 1980s.

== Filmography ==
- Seaside Hotel (TV Series; 2013-2022)
- Apple Tree Yard (2017)
- Borgen (2010)
- En ganske snill mann (2010)
- Lotto (2006)
- Drabet (2005)
- Popular Music (2004)
- Arven (2003)
- Okay (2002)
- Monas Verden (2001)
- The Bench (2000)
- Prop & Berta (2000)
