= Adam Price (screenwriter) =

Danish screenwriter and TV-chef

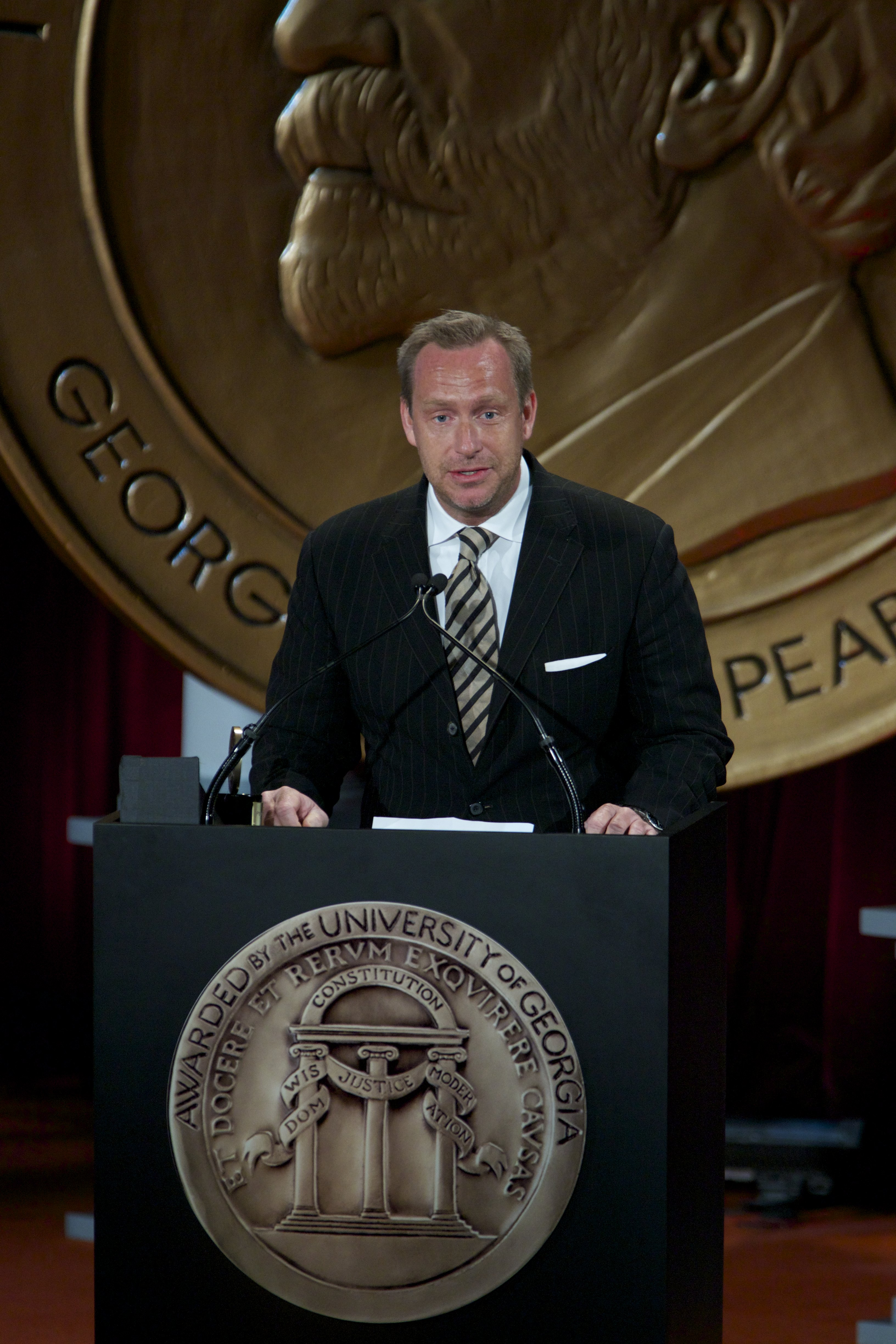
Price accepting the Peabody Award for Borgen (2014)

Adam Price (born 7 May 1967) is a Danish screenwriter, playwright, and restaurateur.

== Early life and education ==
Price's father John was a Danish actor and theatre director. His ancestors were British, and moved to Denmark from London in the late 18th century. Price studied law at the University of Copenhagen in the early 1990s, but had already begun professional script writing in the mid-1980s.

== Career ==
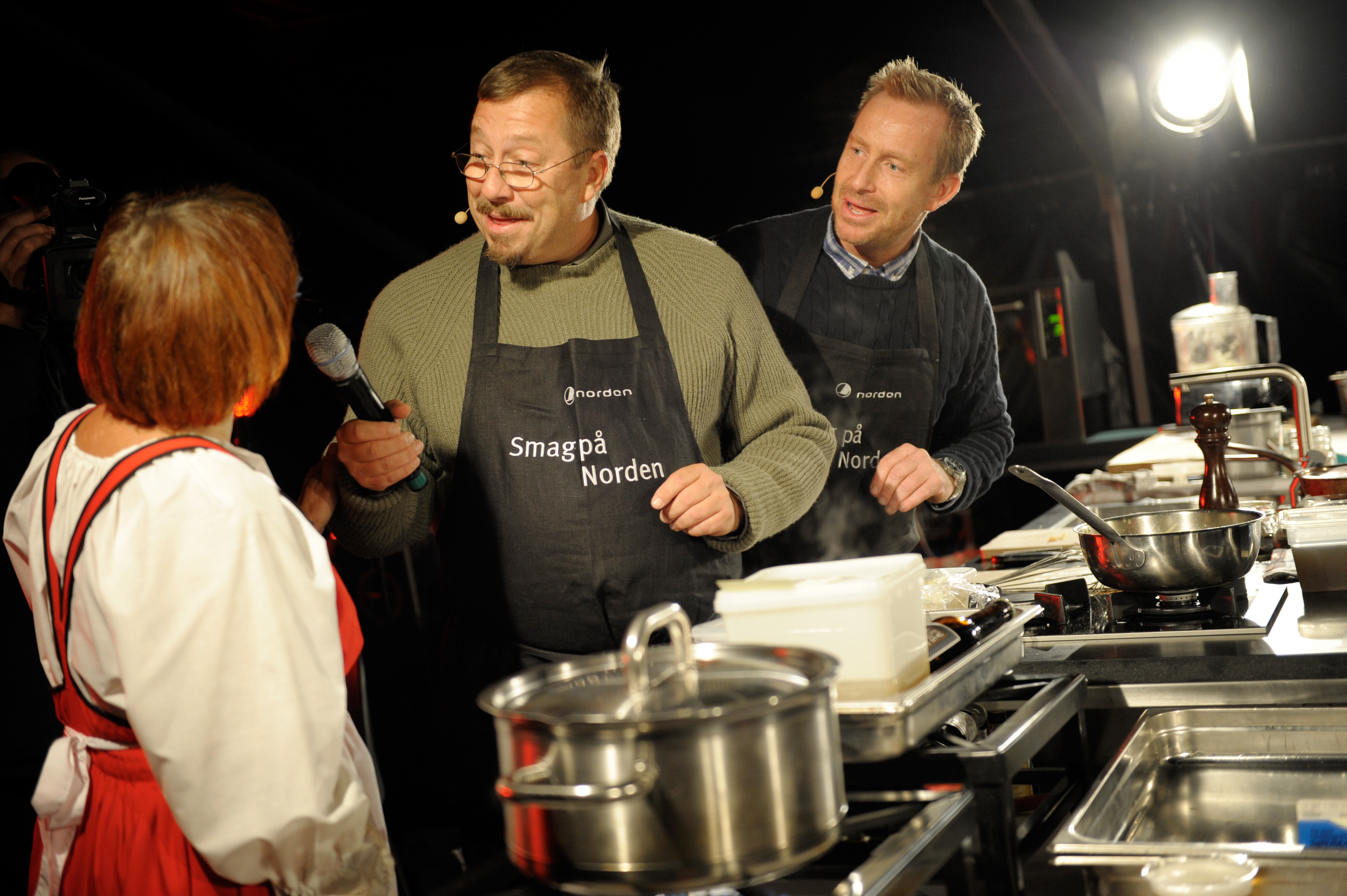
Adam Price (right) and his brother co-presenting Spise med Price in 2010.

Apart from writing, Price also stars as a television chef. With his brother, James Price, he co-hosts the Danish Broadcasting Corporation television programme Spise med Price (Eat with Price), which began in 2008, and entered its twelfth series in 2020. He is the writer of several cookbooks, and co-owns six Brdr. Price restaurants in Denmark. He has also worked as a freelance journalist, writing as a food-critic at the Danish newspaper Politiken. From 2001 to 2005 he was Head of Drama for the Danish broadcaster TV 2 (Denmark).

== Work ==
Price has written a number of television series that have reached a broad audience in many countries around the world. He was a staff writer on the television series Taxa for DR Drama (1997–98). His television series Ride Upon the Storm (DR, 2017 - 2018) has been sold widely around the world and was awarded the 2019 C21 Media international drama award in the category Best Non-English Language Drama. Price created the critically acclaimed television series Borgen (DR Drama 2008–2012), which was awarded a BAFTA award for Best International Drama. Price wrote Ragnarok (2020).

For the theatre, Price has written a number of plays and musicals, lately the critically acclaimed A Conversation Before Death (the Betty Nansen Theatre, Copenhagen 2014).

== Awards ==
- Danish TV Award for Best Drama in 2006 for his TV series Anna Pihl (TV 2 Drama)
- He was behind the original idea of the Emmy Award-winning Nikolaj og Julie (DR Drama).
