= Jack and the Cuckoo-Clock Heart =

2013 French animated musical film

- Theatrical release poster
- Directed by: Stéphane Berla; Mathias Malzieu
- Screenplay by: Mathias Malzieu
- Based on: La Mécanique du cœur by Mathias Malzieu
- Produced by: Luc Besson; Virginie Silla-Besson
- Edited by: Soline Guyonneau
- Music by: Dionysos
- Production companies: Duran; EuropaCorp; France 3 Cinéma; uFilm; Walking the Dog
- Distributed by: EuropaCorp Distribution
- Release dates: 17 November 2013 (Arras Film Festival); 5 February 2014 (France)
- Running time: 93 minutes
- Country: France
- Languages: English; French; Spanish
- Budget: €19.5 million
- Box office: $3.5 million

Jack and the Cuckoo-Clock Heart is a 2013 French animated musical romantic fantasy film based on the novel La Mécanique du cœur written by musician Mathias Malzieu and the concept album by French rock band Dionysos, which he is the frontman for and who also composed the film's music.

The original French version, Jack et la mécanique du cœur, which literally translates as Jack and the Mechanic of the Heart, was released in October 2013, with English, German, Finnish, and Spanish versions being released in 2014.

== Plot ==
In Edinburgh, Scotland in 1874, Jack is born on the coldest day on Earth, causing him to be born with a frozen heart that does not beat. A midwife, Madeleine saves his life by replacing his heart with a cuckoo clock. She then tells him of three rules to prevent his untimely death: he must never play with the clock's hands, lose his temper, or fall in love. Jack's mother decides that Madeleine will be a better mother than she ever would to raise Jack, and Madeleine, who is incapable of bearing children, raises and loves him as her own.

On Jack's tenth birthday, Madeleine repeats the three rules before taking him into town for the first time, where he meets and falls in love with a girl named Miss Acacia. Soon after, he starts school and meets Joe, a bully who is also in love with Miss Acacia and, along with his gang, torments Jack for the next four years. When Joe assaults Jack, the cuckoo of his clock heart gouges out Joe's eye, and Jack runs home believing he has murdered Joe. Madeleine, believing Jack to be a fugitive, helps him escape.

Jack, who wants to see Miss Acacia again, eventually meets up with Georges Méliès, a magician attempting to operate an early film camera. Georges, with his impeccable mustache helps repair his heart and agrees to join Jack in the search for Miss Acacia, which leads them to Andalusia, Spain.

After a journey, they arrive at a circus in Andalusia, where Jack finds Miss Acacia; however, Georges advises him not to reveal his identity to her. He befriends her and avoids sharing his feelings with her. Jack can’t help but admire her for her beauty, as well as her now grown up mannerisms. Jack begins spending time with her, falling deeper in love with her while ignoring each cog that falls from his heart every so often. Jack, after spending weeks with her, attempts to kiss her, but she declines, claiming her heart belongs to another from her past, which turns out to be Jack. Jack eventually finds a way to reveal himself and gives Miss Acacia a key that can be used to wind his heart.

Before Jack and Miss Acacia can run away together, Joe shows up, having been looking for an opportunity to further punish Jack. He explains to Miss Acacia the three rules of Jack's cuckoo clock heart in an attempt to sabotage their love, as well as Jack's happiness as he did when they were children. Miss Acacia, after talking with Joe, decides she does not want to cause Jack's death by allowing him to fall in love any further with her. She rejects him and leaves with Joe, and Jack tears off the door to the mechanics of his heart, making it start to slow down which made him weak.

While in the carriage with Miss Acacia, Joe tells her that soon after Jack escaped with help from Madeleine, she was sent to prison and died soon afterward, with rumors stating she died of a broken heart. Miss Acacia realizes she holds the key to Jack's survival and returns to search for him, learning that Jack had departed for his home in Edinburgh and learned what happened to Madeleine.

Miss Acacia finds Jack in front of Madeleine's grave and tries to use the key to turn his clock; however, he throws away the key and chooses to die in a last attempt to feel the love he's so desperately wanted. They kiss, and when Jack breaks the kiss, time has stopped for him. He looks at the love of his life, Miss Acacia, one last time, touching her cheek, then looks to the sky. The movie ends with Jack climbing up to heaven by using the frozen snowflakes as a ladder.

== Cast ==
- Mathias Malzieu (French) and Orlando Seale (English) as Jack
- Olivia Ruiz (French) and Samantha Barks (English) as Miss Acacia
- Grand Corps Malade (French) and Harry Sadeghi (English) as Joe
- Marie Vincent and Emily Loizeau (French) and Barbara Scaff (English) as Madeleine
- Jean Rochefort (French) and Stéphane Cornicard (English) as Georges Méliès
- Rossy de Palma (French) and Jessie Buckley (English version) as Luna
- Arthur H (French) and Richard Ridings (English) as Arthur
- Dani (French) and Michelle Fairley (English) as Brigette Heim
- Alain Bashung (French) and Howard Samuels (English) as Jack the Ripper
- Cali (French) and Steve Nicholson (English) as the crying man

== Production ==
In his first production, Mathias Malzieu adapts his novel La Mécanique du cœur from 2007. The book had also inspired the homonymous album of the group Dionysos, of which he is the lead member, which released the same year.

Singer-songwriter Olivia Ruiz voices the character Miss Acacia in the movie. Meanwhile, Grand Corps Malade and Arthur H, also singer-songwriters, both voice Joe and Arthur respectively as well as the actor Jean Rochefort playing as the director and illusionist Georges Méliès. For the choice of the latter, Malzieu explains: “There was a certain resemblance between the two: I cannot say if it is the mustache, the inventive side which is both a little depressive but also very playful or even the capacity for wonder still intact regardless of age.

Following the death of Alain Bashung in 2009, his recordings from the album were reused for the movie.

The film was directed by Stéphane Berla, the director of the band's previous video clips, and Mathias Malzieu. The film was originally set to be released on October 17, 2012 in France but was delayed until October 2013. It was later revealed that the bankruptcy of French animation studio Duran Duboi caused the delay.

== Reception ==
=== Critical response ===
On review aggregator Rotten Tomatoes, the film holds an approval rating of 77% based on 13 reviews, with an average score of 6.5/10. On Metacritic, which assigns a normalized rating to reviews, the film has a weighted average score of 56 out of 100, based on 6 critics, indicating "mixed or average reviews". Sandie Angulo Chen of Common Sense Media gave the film 3 out of 5 stars praising the humor and romance, but criticized the character building between Madeleine and her friends.

=== Recognition and award nominations ===
The film received recognition in the animation industry:

- It was chosen as the opening film for the 25th anniversary of the CineMagic film festival.
- It was one of three films nominated for the 2014 European Film Award for Best Animated Feature Film, but lost to The Art of Happiness.
- It was one of three films nominated for the 2015 César Award for Best Animated Film, but lost to Minuscule: Valley of the Lost Ants.
- It was one of twenty films submitted to the 87th Academy Awards for consideration in the Animated Feature Film category, but was not chosen.
