= La Mécanique du Cœur =

La mécanique du cœur

Studio album by Dionysos
- Released: 5 November 2007
- Recorded: March/April 2007, Valence
- Genre: Rock, art rock
- Length: 59:53
- Label: Barclay, Universal Music
- Producer: Mathias Malzieu, Mike Ponton

Dionysos chronology
Monsters in Love (2005)	La mécanique du cœur (2007)	Bird 'n' Roll (2012)

Professional ratings
Review scores
Source	Rating
RFI Musique	(not rated)

La Mécanique du Cœur is the sixth studio album by the French band Dionysos, released on 5 November 2007. The title can be translated as the mechanics of the heart; the album complements the book of the same name written by Mathias Malzieu, the band's frontman. The album has sold over 75,000 copies, making it a Gold Disc, and has been adapted into a film directed by Malzieu.

== Background ==
The album follows on from Monsters in Love, an album telling the stories of various monsters imagined by the band. There are several references from this album to the one that precedes it.

A lot of the band's oeuvre has been inspired by the work of Tim Burton, and the artwork from this album has strong influences from Corpse Bride. The music video from the first single ("Tais toi mon cœur") is animated in the same style. The songs alternate between French, English, and Spanish for Miss Acacia.

This album features many guest appearances from prominent French stars: Eric Cantona narrates the epilogue, Olivia Ruiz (the lead singer's partner) appears on several tracks, Grand Corps Malade co-writes two tracks, Jean Rochefort sings on one song to mention but a few.

The band's violinist "Babet" (Élisabeth Maistre) only appears on the track "Cunnilingus Mon Amour!" because she was busy working on her solo career whilst the album was being recorded. However, she is scheduled to appear on the March 2008 tour promoting the album.

== Story ==
The album follows a strong concept, based around the book of the same name (written by the band's lead singer Mathias Malzieu). It tells the story of Little Jack, a child born in Edinburgh in 1874 on the coldest day in the world. He is born with a frozen heart which the midwife, Docteur Madeleine, replaces with a cuckoo clock – it works, but means that he must "not touch the hands. Control his temper. And most importantly, never ever fall in love" or else the clock will explode through his skin.

Alas, he falls in love with an Andalucian singer Miss Acacia on the streets of Edinburgh which makes his heart malfunction. Docteur Madeleine fixes him but restates he must never fall in love.

In an attempt to find her again, he enrolls at school where he meets his nemesis Joe, who has also fallen in love with Miss Acacia. Joe threatens Jack so that he won't look for her. For Jack, school for the next four years is torment, being humiliated by Joe and bullied because of his clockwork heart. On his last day of school, Jack is desperate for Miss Acacia and asks Joe where he could find her. They fight, and Jack pierces Joe in the eye with the hands of his clock. Thinking he might be dead, he runs home to Madeleine and tells her what's happened.

Arthur appears saying the police are coming, so Jack is sent on his way to escape, with not much to his name and instructions to find a clocksmith, not a doctor, to look after his heart. He travels first to London where he meets Jack the Ripper who comes close to killing him due to his overcuriosity. Jack flees, leaving London to cross the channel to Paris. In Paris, Jack searches for a watchmaker. The first he meets is disgusted by his disfigurement and sends Jack away; the second man he meets doesn't fix him but sends him off to the 'magician' Georges Méliès. Méliès looks after not only his heart but gives him advice in love, and accompanies him on his voyage to Andalucia.

In Andalucia Jack searches for Acacia, seemingly to no avail, until they are guided by someone to some kind of carnival. Jack sees her for the first time since they first met, and is still in love. He creeps into her caravan after the show and gives her a bunch of glasses, and they agree to meet again. Jack gets a job working on the ghost train, with an evil employer Brigitte Heim – he is not particularly good at his job because people often leave the ride giggling.

After several years, Miss Acacia has become more famous, but Joe returns. He is at first unrecognized, but due to his missing eye is far better at scaring people so takes Little Jack's job at the ghost train. One night he goes to see Miss Acacia perform, where Jack encounters Joe. Joe slowly seems to be winning her away from Jack, and he becomes so jealous he breaks his own heart, jamming a knife into the gears.

Three years pass as Jack sleeps in a coma. Méliès has promised to replace his old wooden heart which he does before returning to Paris, leaving Jack in the care of a nurse he once womanized. Jack wakes up and tries to deal with his new body, which is hard even for himself to recognise due to the changes and developments – this gives him the chance to visit L'Extraordinarium to see Miss Acacia without her knowing his true identity. After some time he reveals who he is, presenting his old heart to her in a box. She realises it is him, and, believing him to have died three years previously and that his reappearance confirms her earlier suspicions of deceit, rejects him.

Jack's new body keeps growing – he becomes a giant (Giant Jack from the previous album Monsters in Love). In the epilogue he travels back to Scotland where he meets Arthur, who reveals the secret of Jack's life: he needed his clockwork heart to survive for the first few months of life, but after that his heart of flesh and blood functioned normally. Madeleine kept this a secret because she wanted to shelter him.

== Track listing ==
All songs: music by Dionysos, lyrics by Mathias Malzieu except for where stated.

No.	Title	Vocalist	Length
1.	"Le Jour Le Plus Froid Du Monde"	Emily Loizeau	4:53
2.	"La Berceuse Hip Hop Du Docteur Madeleine"	Emily Loizeau	3:38
3.	"When The Saints Go Marchin'in"	Arthur H	2:51
4.	"Flamme À Lunettes"	Olivia Ruiz	5:11
5.	"Symphonie Pour Horloge Cassée"		2:40
6.	"Cunnilingus Mon Amour!"	Babet & Rossy de Palma	3:00
7.	"Thème De Joe"	Grand Corps Malade	2:14
8.	"L'École De Joe"		2:59
9.	"L'Homme Sans Trucage"	Jean Rochefort	3:24
10.	"La Panique Mécanique"	Alain Bashung	4:06
11.	"King of the Ghost Train"		2:19
12.	"Mademoiselle Clé"	Olivia Ruiz	2:57
13.	"Candy Lady"	Olivia Ruiz	3:51
14.	"Le Retour De Joe"	Grand Corps Malade	2:08
15.	"Death Song"		3:17
16.	"Tais Toi Mon Coeur"	Olivia Ruiz	2:33
17.	"Whatever The Weather"		3:21
18.	"Épilogue"	Eric Cantona	4:31

== Production ==
This is Dionysos' first self-produced album. It was recorded by Mike Ponton (the lead guitarist) and produced by him with Mathias Malzieu (the lead singer). The album was recorded near Valence in March and April 2007, and mastered in Paris in May. The CD of the album is an Opendisc, which allows access to exclusive content including a video about how the album was made.

== Film adaptation ==
Luc Besson's production company EuropaCorp has bought the rights for a film adaptation of the accompanying book. Mathias will script and co-direct with Stéphane Berla, director of several of the band's music videos. Joann Sfar, cover artist, will help transfer the story from book to screen as artistic director. The original plan was for an animation in the style of the music video for "Tais Toi Mon Cœur", directed by Stéphane Berla.

== Personnel ==
=== The band ===
Mathias Malzieu — vocal, ukulele, folk guitar, glockenspiel
Mike Ponton — guitar, 'scratches', programming, ukulele
Eric Serra-Tosio — drums, percussion, whistle
Olivier Daviaud — cello, piano, melodica, glockenspiel, mellotron, keys, piano, arrangements
Stéphan Bertholio — banjo, keys, bass, glockenspiel, ukulele, baritone guitar, lapsteel guitar

=== Guests ===
Each of the guests play the part of one of the story's characters.

Emily Loizeau – plays the part of Docteur Madeleine, Jack's guardian
Arthur H – plays the part of retired alcoholic policeman Arthur
Olivia Ruiz – plays the part of Miss Acacia, the love interest who also features on the previous album
Rossy de Palma – plays Luna, a prostitute who teaches Jack things (including the word 'Cunnilingus', which he names his hamster)
Babet (aka Élisabeth Maistre) – plays another prostitute, Luna's friend Anna
Grand Corps Malade – plays the part of Joe, singing and writing the two relevant tracks
Jean Rochefort – plays Georges Méliès
Alain Bashung – plays Jack the Ripper
Eric Cantona – plays Giant Jack, a character from Monsters in Love, who narrates the epilogue

=== Additional musicians ===
Blaise Margail – trombone, beatbox
Martin Saccardy – trumpet, bugle
Guillaume Garidel – double bass, bass
Gérard Tempia Bonda – violin
Michel Schick – clarinet, bass clarinet, flute
Stéphane Blanc – double bass
Bertrand Belin – banjo, theremin

=== Art ===
Joann Sfar & Karim Friha – cover art
Flammarion Studio – calligraphy

== Bibliography ==
La mécanique du cœur book and album sleevenotes
