= Bird 'n' Roll =

Studio album by Dionysos
- Released: 26 March 2012
- Genres: Rock, Art Rock
- Labels: Barclay, Universal Music

Dionysos chronology
La Mécanique du Cœur (2007)	Bird 'n' Roll (2012)	Vampire en pyjama (2016)

Bird 'n' Roll[1] is the seventh studio album by the French rock band Dionysos, released 26 March 2012.  The album features songs in both French and English.

There are several links between this album and lead singer Mathias Malzieu's Métamorphose en bord de ciel, similar to other relationships between the band's discography and Mathias Malzieu's novels, such as La Mécanique du cœur. The first single Cloudman came out on 23 January 2012, following teasers that hinted that the music video would depict the transformation of Tom Cloudman as in the novel Métamorphose en bord de ciel.

For this album Babet participated actively in the band, after having taken only a minor role in their last album five years earlier, "La Mécanique du Cœur".

Some new instruments feature in this album, following the band's acoustic tour in 2009. The album itself has been described as "rock for birds", which supports its link to the novel, Métamorphose en bord de ciel. However, unlike La Mécanique du Cœur, only five tracks of the twelve link directly to the novel, taking the band back to the formula of the preceding album, Monsters in Love.

== Musicians and instruments ==
=== Band ===
- Mathias Malzieu: vocals, ukulele, folk guitar, harmonica
- Michaël Ponton: guitar, percussion, chorus
- Éric Serra-Tosio: drums, percussion, whistle, chorus
- Stéphan Bertholio: keys, banjo, musical saw, glockenspiel, lapsteel, guitar, chorus, music box, melodica
- Guillaume Garidel: bass, double bass, musical glasses, Moog synthesizer, chorus, mellotron
- Élisabeth Maistre: vocals, violon, stylophone, chorus, bells

=== Additional Musicians ===
- Olivier Daviaud: piano, whistle, chorus
- Lise Chemla: chorus, vocals
- Guillemette Foucard: chorus, vocals
- Johanna Hilaire: chorus, vocals

== Track listing ==
No.	Title	Length
1.	"Bird 'n' roll"	3.36
2.	"Cloudman"	2.43
3.	"La Sirène et le Pygmalion"	4.58
4.	"June Carter en slim"	3.08
5.	"Le Roi en pyjama"	2.58
6.	"Dreamoscope"	3.19
7.	"Le Grand Cheval aux yeux gris"	2.57
8.	"Sex with a Bird"	2.33
9.	"Dark Side"	4.24
10.	"Platini(s)"	3.34
11.	"Le Retour de Jack l'inventeur"	4.23
12.	"Spidergirl Blues"	3.16
