= Western sous la neige =

Studio album by Dionysos
- Released: 5.3.2002
- Recorded: 2002
- Genre: Rock, art rock
- Label: Trema, Universal Music
- Producer: Steve Albini

Dionysos chronology
Haïku	Western sous la neige	Monsters in Love

Western sous la neige is the fourth studio album by Dionysos, a French rock band, released 5 March 2002 and produced by Steve Albini. The title translates as western in the snow, and encapsulates the surrealist style of the album. The band's lead singer wrote a book 38 mini westerns in the same year.

This album broke the band into the mainstream thanks to their first radio hit Song for Jedi; this album is also a Gold Disc. The French edition of Rolling Stone magazine named this album the 92nd greatest French rock album (out of 100). It was also included in the book Philippe Manœuvre présente : Rock français, de Johnny à BB Brunes, 123 albums essentiels.

Two live albums Whatever the Weather (an acoustic and an electric version) were released, composed mainly of songs from this album. There is also a live DVD of the same name.

== Themes ==
There are several recurring themes throughout the album. The tennis player John McEnroe is repeatedly referenced - the lead singer aspired to be like his hero before an accident ended his tennis-playing career.

== Production ==
The album was recorded in just fifteen days, mixing included. The album has a more natural and live sound than its predecessor Haïku. It was mastered at Abbey Road Studios.

The album was originally released on the Trema label, which has since been bought over by Universal. The album is now under their Barclay label.

== Track listing ==
All songs by Dionysos

1. "Intro : theme from "Western sous la neige""
2. "Coiffeur d'oiseaux"
3. "Tokyo Montana"
4. "Longboard blues"
5. "Déguisé en pas moi"
6. "Mc Enroe's poetry"
7. "Don Diego 2000" intro
8. "Don Diego 2000"
9. "Surfin Frog"
10. "Coffin song"
11. "She is the Liquid Princess"
12. "Petit Colorado"
13. "Anorak"
14. "I love you"
15. "Longboard train"
16. "Song for Jedi"
17. "Rodéo" + hidden track "Mc Enroe folk"

== Personnel ==
=== The band ===
Mathias Malzieu – vocals, folk guitar, harmonica
Michael Ponton – electric guitar, 'scratches', keys, backing vocals
Eric Serra-Tosio – drums, maracas, whistle
Guillaume Garidel – bass, double bass, keys
Elisabeth Ferrer (now Maistre) – violin, piano, keys, castanets, "demi-lune", backing vocals

=== Guests ===
JP Maillard – bass on "Mc Enroe's poetry"
Greg – as John McEnroe
Lionel Darenne – handclaps on "Anorak"

=== Production ===
Produced by Steve Albini
Assistants: Lionel Darenne and J-P Maillard
Mixed by Steve Albini and Dionysos at Electrical Audio (Chicago)
Mastered at Abbey Road by Steve Rooke
