= Vampire en pyjama =

Studio album by Dionysos
- Released: 29 January 2016
- Genres: Rock, Art Rock
- Label: Columbia Records
- Producer: L'Extraordinarium

Dionysos chronology
Bird 'n' Roll (2012)	Vampire en pyjama (2016)

Vampire en pyjama is the eighth studio album by Dionysos, and was released on 29 January 2016, two days after Mathias Malzieu's novel, Journal d'un vampire en pyjama. The album was intended to be more acoustic than those before it and the lyrics are more personal. A mascote accompanies this album : a man with a heart for a head, Heartman, frequently drawn by the band and its fans in the streets of their own towns.

== Track listing ==
No.	Title	Length
1.	"Chanson d'été"	3.22
2.	"Guerrier de porcelaine"	2.41
3.	"Vampire de l'amour"	2.23
4.	"Hospital Blues"	3.50
5.	"L'Heure des lueurs"	2.37
6.	"Skateboarding sous morphine"	2.51
7.	"Know Your Anemy"	2.38
8.	"I Follow Rivers"	3.15
9.	"Dame Ocles"	3.08
10.	"Le Petit Lion"	2.26
11.	"Déguisé en moi"	3.14
12.	"Le Chant du mauvais cygne"	2.23
13.	"Vampire en pyjama"	2.34

== The tour ==
Dionysos announced the first date and the start of the band's tour on its Facebook page, planned for 3 May 2016 at the Grand Rex. Following this, the band has announced around forty dates across France.

== Musicians and instruments ==
=== Band ===
- Mathias Malzieu: vocals, folk guitar, harmonica
- Michaël Ponton: electric guitar, banjo, xylophone, glockenspiel, programming, dobro guitar, chorus
- Éric Serra-Tosio: drums, whistling, chorus
- Stéphan Bertholio: bass, keyboard, folk guitar, musical saw, chorus
- Élisabet Maistre: vocals, violin, banjo, chorus, programming, keyboards
- Olivier Daviaud: arrangement of horns, chords and chorus, piano, cello, keyboard, chorus, mellotron

=== Additional Musicians ===
Le Quatuor Akilone

- Émeline Concé: first violin
- Élise De-Bendelac: second violin
- Louise Desjardin: alto
- Lucie Mercat: cello

Horns

- Maxime Tomba
- Pierre Badol

=== Additional programming ===
- Matthieu Jay
- Pierrick Devin
- Clément Leveau
- Guest : Rosemary Texeira in Le petit Lion

== Features of the album ==
- La chanson I Follow Rivers is a cover of a song by Lykke Li.
- Chanson d'été follows on from the poem by Paul Verlaine, Chanson d'automne.
- Hospital Blues is sung at the beginning and at the by Mathias Malzieu in head voice.
- The songs are linked to Journal d'un vampire en pyjama by Mathias Malzieu, in a similar way to the links between the band's previous albums and Malzieu's novels.
- Hospital Blues and Chanson d'été were composed at the hospital Mathias Malzieu stayed at.

== Charts ==
=== Weekly charts ===
Chart (2016)	Peak position
Belgian Albums (Ultratop Wallonia)	37
French Albums (SNEP)	15
Swiss Albums (Schweizer Hitparade)	90

=== Year-end charts ===
Chart (2016)	Position
French Albums (SNEP)	190
