= A Mermaid in Paris =

2020 film by Mathias Malzieu

- Theatrical release poster
- French: Une sirène à Paris
- Directed by: Mathias Malzieu
- Written by: Mathias Malzieu; Stéphane Landowski
- Produced by: Grégoire Melin; Sébastien Delloye
- Starring: Nicolas Duvauchelle; Marilyn Lima; Romane Bohringer; Rossy de Palma; Tchéky Karyo; Alexis Michalik; Rodolphe Pauly
- Cinematography: Virginie Saint-Martin
- Edited by: Thibault Hague
- Music by: Dionysos
- Production companies: Overdrive Productions; Entre Chien et Loup; Sisters and Brother Mitevski Production; EuropaCorp; Proximus
- Distributed by: Sony Pictures Releasing France
- Release date: 11 March 2020 (France)
- Running time: 102 minutes
- Countries: France; Belgium; North Macedonia
- Languages: French; English
- Box office: $683,124

A Mermaid in Paris (French: Une sirène à Paris) is a 2020 fantasy romantic comedy film directed by Mathias Malzieu, who co-wrote the script with Stéphane Landowski. An international co-production of France, Belgium and North Macedonia, the film stars Nicolas Duvauchelle and Marilyn Lima and follows a crooner who rescues a mermaid in Paris and slowly falls in love with her.

The film was released in France on 11 March 2020 by the French division of Sony Pictures Releasing.

== Plot ==
In Paris, Gaspard Snow is a 40-year-old crooner at the Flowerburger, a bohemian-style cabaret on a barge founded by his grandmother in the early 1940s and currently owned by his aging father Camille. With the Flowerburger facing bankruptcy, Camille wants to sell it, but Gaspard refuses to part with his grandmother's legacy, struggling to cope with the death of both his mother and grandmother.

Walking home one night, Gaspard finds an unconscious mermaid washed ashore in the Seine and rushes her to a hospital. While he speaks to the receptionist, the mermaid is examined by a doctor, Victor, who is hypnotized by her singing and later dies suddenly. Unable to get her admitted to the hospital, Gaspard brings the mermaid to his apartment and places her in his bathtub. Regaining consciousness, she attempts to hypnotize Gaspard, but he is immune to her singing. As he tends to a wound on her tail, she introduces herself as Lula and tells him that she must return to the ocean in two days or she will die, but Gaspard insists that she stay until her wound is fully healed.

The next morning, Lula is surprised that Gaspard is still alive, as men who hear her singing usually fall so deeply in love with her that their hearts explode. He declares that he no longer believes in love due to a past heartbreak. After he leaves for work, Lula receives a visit from Rossy, Gaspard's nosy and eccentric next-door neighbor. Believing that Lula is Gaspard's new girlfriend, Rossy tells her the story of the Flowerburger and how important it is to Gaspard.

Meanwhile, Milena, Victor's pregnant girlfriend who is also a doctor, is devastated and confused by his sudden death. Investigating Victor's death, Milena finds a pop-up book left behind by Gaspard at the hospital; the book chronicles the history of the Flowerburger and was given to him by his grandmother before her death. Outside the hospital, Milena finds a gooey blue substance, which a biologist at the hospital determines is the blood of an unknown creature that cannot survive for long out of the ocean. After learning of a possible mermaid sighting in Paris, a vengeful Milena becomes determined to find the mermaid.

In Gaspard's bathtub, Lula tries smoking a cigarette left by Rossy but drops the lit cigarette, inadvertently starting a fire that nearly burns down the entire building. Rushing back home, Gaspard finds Lula hiding under his bathtub and takes her to Rossy's bathtub. Despite the incident, Gaspard and Lula grow closer, and he proposes a farewell party at the Flowerburger before returning her to the ocean.

That night at the Flowerburger, Gaspard introduces Lula to Camille, who is delighted that his son has seemingly found love. Lula tells Gaspard that her mother was killed by a sailor and that she has since killed several sailors in revenge. Shortly after Milena arrives at the Flowerburger looking for Lula, Gaspard takes Lula to a shark tank, where he dives in to swim with her and they kiss underwater.

The next morning, Gaspard is reluctant to let Lula go. While he leaves to get Lula a fish, she asks Rossy to help her escape as she fears for Gaspard's life. When Gaspard returns home, he finds Milena and the biologist collecting samples from his bathtub, as Milena declares her intention to prevent Lula from claiming more victims. Demanding to know Lula's whereabouts, Gaspard faints and is taken to the hospital, where Milena is keeping Lula and extracting her blood.

After Rossy poses as a nurse and creates a distraction, Gaspard leads Lula away from Paris, with Milena in pursuit. Gaspard plunges Lula into a river and she swims away. As he faints, Milena hallucinates that Gaspard is Victor, prompting her to revive Gaspard with CPR. Back home, Gaspard receives a bottle containing Lula's priceless tears of pearls from the biologist. He uses the pearls to buy the Flowerburger from his father and sets sail with it, hoping one day to be reunited with Lula.

== Cast ==
- Nicolas Duvauchelle as Gaspard
- Marilyn Lima as Lula
- Rossy de Palma as Rossy
- Tchéky Karyo as Camille
- Romane Bohringer as Milena
- Alexis Michalik as Victor
- Rodolphe Pauly as Henri
- Lola Bessis as the pin-up
- Nicolas Avinée as the biologist
- Cali as the fire chief
- Dionysos as themselves

== Production ==
Principal photography began on 29 August 2019 and concluded on 17 October 2019. Filming took place in North Macedonia over a period of six weeks, with locations including Bitola and a studio in Skopje, followed by two weeks of location shooting in Paris and Étretat, France.

== Reception ==
On the review aggregator website Rotten Tomatoes, the film holds an approval rating of 100% based on 13 reviews, with an average rating of 7.9/10. Wilson Kwong of Film Inquiry reviewed the film positively, stating, "A Mermaid in Paris is a refreshingly original film about what it means to believe in the things you love, and in doing that, makes a strong argument of why you should love the film itself." Eye for Film's Amber Wilkinson scored the film 3/5, saying, "You can get a way with a lot when you deliver it with this much panache."
