= Rossy de Palma =

Spanish actress and model

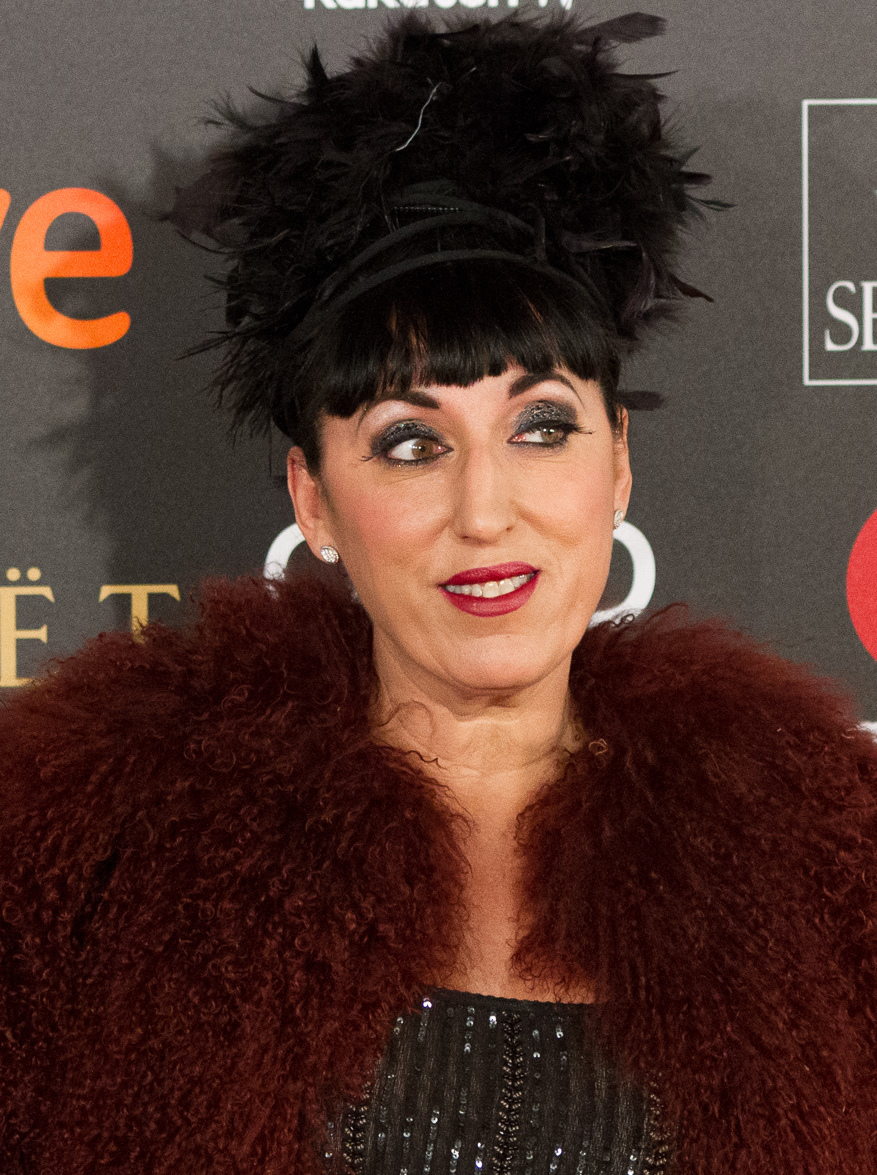
- De Palma in 2018
- Born: Rosa Elena García Echave; 16 September 1964 (age 62); Palma, Balearic Islands, Spain
- Occupations: Actress; model
- Years active: 1987–present

Rosa Elena García Echave (born 16 September 1964), known professionally as Rossy de Palma, is a Spanish actress and model. She is well known for her roles in films by Pedro Almodóvar such as Law of Desire, Women on the Verge of a Nervous Breakdown, Kika, The Flower of My Secret, Julieta, and Parallel Mothers.

== Life and career ==
Born in Palma de Mallorca, her parents are from Avilés, Asturias where she spent summers in her childhood. One of her nephews is TPA journalist Giuseppe Montoto. In the 1980s, during the Movida cultural movement, she moved to Madrid.

In 1984, she founded the pop music group Peor Impossible, for which she was a singer and a dancer. In 1986, she met Pedro Almodóvar in a café in Madrid. He was impressed by her performance during one of the group's concerts. He proposed a role in his next film, Law of Desire. Rossy lent some of her personal dresses to Carmen Maura, who was playing the lead trans female character of the film, Tina Quintero.

Her first major role was in 1988, in Almodóvar's Women on the Verge of a Nervous Breakdown, and she went on to be one of Almodóvar's recurring collaborators. She modeled for designers Jean-Paul Gaultier, Thierry Mugler, and Sybilla. She then appeared in Robert Altman's 1994 satirical fashion film Prêt-à-Porter, and in the music video of George Michael's "Too Funky" song.

She has two children and currently lives in Paris, where she acts and models. As of 2010, she is a theater actress, charity spokeswoman for the Ghanaian charity OrphanAid Africa, and the face of luxury ad campaigns. In 2007, she released a perfume line under her name with État libre d'Orange. In 2009, she posed nude in an information campaign on breast cancer for the magazine Marie Claire. She was selected to be on the jury for the main competition section of the 2015 Cannes Film Festival. In 2022, Rossy de Palma was appointed UNESCO Goodwill Ambassador for cultural diversity.

== Other work ==
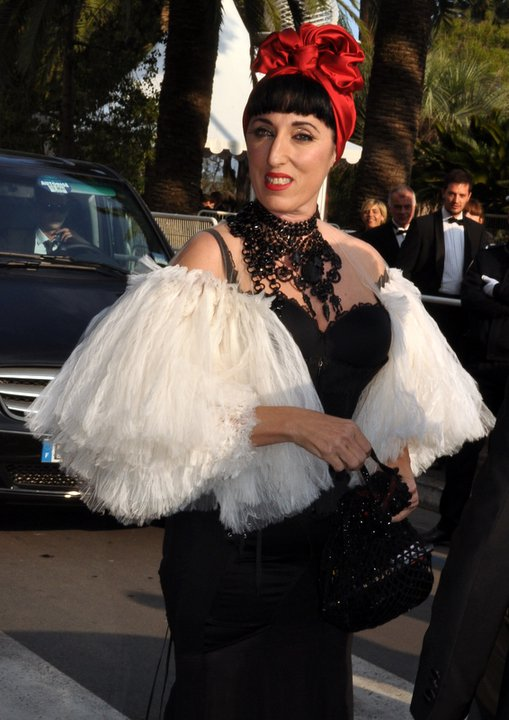
De Palma at the 2011 Cannes Film Festival

She is an ambassador for the charity OAfrica, which advocates for a family for every child in Ghana, West Africa, and the closure of illegal orphanages.

In 2011 she was one of the contestants during the first season of Danse avec les stars. With her partner Christophe Licata she finished in the 7th position (second-to-last).

In 2018 she collaborated with singer Rosalía for her second studio album El mal querer writing the song "Preso" with her and Ferrán Echegaray. Her vocals were also used in the song.

== Filmography ==
=== Cinema ===
Year	Title	Role	Director	Notes
1987	Law of Desire	TV Host	Pedro Almodóvar	
1988	Women on the Verge of a Nervous Breakdown	Marisa	Pedro Almodóvar	
1989	Tie Me Up! Tie Me Down!	Drug Dealer	Pedro Almodóvar	
1990	Nel giardino delle rose	Rosy	Luciano Martino	
1990	Alcune signore per bene	Donatella	Bruno Gaburro	
1990	Don Juan, mi querido fantasma	Prodini's widow	Antonio Mercero	
1992	Sam suffit	Chichi	Virginie Thévenet	
1992	Aquí, el que no corre... vuela	The neighbor	Ramón Fernández	
1992	Los gusanos no llevan bufanda	Lady 2	Javier Elorrieta	
1993	Kika	Juana	Pedro Almodóvar	
1993	Mutant Action	Luxury guest	Álex de la Iglesia	
1994	Fea		Dunia Ayaso and Félix Sabroso	
1994	Prêt-à-Porter	Pilar	Robert Altman	
1994	Chicken Park	Necrophelia Addams	Jerry Calà	
1994	Mejor no hables		Pedro Paz	Short
1995	El perquè de tot plegat	Librarian	Ventura Pons	
1995	Peggio di così si muore	Myrna	Marcello Cesena	
1995	The Flower of My Secret	Rosa	Pedro Almodóvar	
1996	Un cos al bosc	Lieutenant Cifuentes	Joaquim Jordà	
1996	The Blue Collar Worker and the Hairdresser in a Whirl of Sex and Politics		Lina Wertmüller	
1997	Airbag	Carmiña	Juanma Bajo Ulloa	
1997	La femme du cosmonaute	Catherine	Jacques Monnet	
1998	Hors jeu	Concepcion Alibera	Karim Dridi	
1998	Spanish Fly	Interviewee	Daphna Kastner	
1998	Talk of Angels	Elena	Nick Hamm	
1998	Franchesca Page	Veronica	Kelley Sane	
1999	Nag la bombe	Leïla	Jean-Louis Milesi	
1999	Esa Maldita Costilla	Margarita	Juan José Jusid	
1999	The Loss of Sexual Innocence	Blind Woman	Mike Figgis	
2000	La mule	The Colombian	Jean-Stéphane Sauvaire	Short
2001	L'origine du monde	The Sphynx	Jérôme Enrico	
2002	Le Boulet	Pauline Reggio	Alain Berbérian & Frédéric Forestier	
2003	Leave Your Hands on My Hips	Myriam Bardem	Chantal Lauby	
2004	People	Pilar	Fabien Onteniente	
2004	Double zéro	The Eyeglass	Gérard Pirès	
2004	Do You Know Claudia?	Claudia (Aldo's lover)	Massimo Venier	
2005	20 Centimeters	Ice Box	Ramón Salazar	
2006	Girlfriends	Marie's mother	Sylvie Ayme	
2006	Les Aristos	Maria de Malaga i Benidorm	Charlotte de Turckheim	
2006	La edad ideal		Ana Lozano	Short
2009	No pasaran	Inès	Emmanuel Caussé & Eric Martin	
2009	Broken Embraces	Julieta	Pedro Almodóvar	
2010	Gigola	Dominique	Laure Charpentier	
2010	Miss Tacuarembó	Patricia Peinado	Martín Sastre	
2012	30° couleur	Bianca	Lucien Jean-Baptiste & Philippe Larue	
2012	Run a Way	Cop 1	Diego Postigo	Short
2013	&Me	Mama Verona	Norbert ter Hall	
2013	Three Many Weddings	Mónica	Javier Ruiz Caldera	
2013	Jack and the Cuckoo-Clock Heart	Luna	Stéphane Berla & Mathias Malzieu	
2013	I Don't Know Whether to Slit My Wrists or Leave Them Long	Lola	Manolo Caro	
2014	Do Not Disturb	Maria	Patrice Leconte	
2014	Love of My Loves	Carmina	Manolo Caro	
2014	La Divanee	Narrator	Jessica Mitrani	Short
2014	Traveling Lady	Traveling Lady	Jessica Mitrani	Short
2014	Madre Quentina	Quentina	José Ramón Da Cruz	Short
2015	Graziella	Graziella	Mehdi Charef	
2015	Spy Time	Katia's mother	Javier Ruiz Caldera	
2015	Incidencias	The announcer	José Corbacho & Juan Cruz	
2015	Sólo química	Bárbara Sullivan	Alfonso Albacete	
2016	Julieta	Marian	Pedro Almodóvar	
2016	En tu cabeza	Milagros	Borja Cobeaga	
2017	Toc Toc	Ana María	Vicente Villanueva	
2017	Madame	Maria	Amanda Sthers	
2017	El Intercambio	Dómina	Ignacio Nacho	
2017	Lord, Give Me Patience	Maria	Álvaro Díaz Lorenzo	
2018	Brillantissime	Charline	Michèle Laroque	
2018	The Man Who Killed Don Quixote	Farmer's Wife	Terry Gilliam	
2019	I Miss You	Rosaura	Rodrigo Bellott	
2019	Despite Everything	Inés	Gabriela Tagliavini	
2019	À cause des filles ?	Artémis	Pascal Thomas	
2019	Los Rodríguez y el más allá	Doctor Pilar	Paco Arango	
2019	My Brother Chases Dinosaurs	Zia Rock	Stefano Cipani	
2020	Trash	Bliss	Francesco Dafano & Luca Della Grotta	
2020	A Mermaid in Paris	Rossy	Mathias Malzieu	
2021	El refugio		Macarena Astorga	
2021	Parallel Mothers	Elena	Pedro Almodóvar	
2021	Mystère à Saint-Tropez	Carmen Moreno	Nicolas Benamou	
2022	Rainbow		Paco León	
2022	House of Lust	Brigida	Anissa Bonnefont	
2023	Carmen	Masilda	Benjamin Millepied	
2023	Apaches	Sarah Bernardt	Romain Quirot	
2023	3 jours max	Alba Suarez	Tarek Boudali	
2024	Dear Paris	Dolorès	Marjane Satrapi	
TBA	The Opera!	Moire	Paolo Gep Cucco & Davide Livermore	Post-Production

=== Television ===
Year	Title	Role	Director	Notes
1989	Delirios de amor	Robertina	Ceesepe	TV series (1 episode)
1990	Os outros feirantes	Hermelina	Xosé Cermeño	TV mini-series
1994	Hermanos de leche	Berta	Carlos Serrano	TV series (5 episodes)
1994–97	Los ladrones van a la oficina	Eva Duarte	Ramón Fernández & Miguel Ángel Díez	TV series (12 episodes)
1996	Pastas Ardilla	Rossy	Pedro Almodóvar	TV Short
2010	Caterina e le sue figlie	Estrella Toledo	Alessandro Benvenuti, Riccardo Mosca, ...	TV series (8 episodes)
2011	Le monde à ses pieds	Caroline Fox	Christian Faure	TV movie
2013	Familia		Iñaki Mercero & José Ramos Paíno	TV series (1 episode)
2013	Esposados	Rossy	José Luis Moreno	TV series (3 episodes)
2014	La que se avecina	María Luisa	Laura Caballero	TV series (1 episode)
2015	Anclados	Palmira	Mario Montero, Roberto Monge, ...	TV series (8 episodes)
2017	The White Princess	Isabel la Católica	Alex Kalymnios	TV mini-series
2018	Haciendo cerveza	The visitor	Félix Fernández de Castro	TV series (1 episode)
2020	Little Birds	Contessa Mandrax	Stacie Passon	TV series (6 episodes)
2021	Carrément Craignos	Héléna	Jean-Pascal Zadi	TV mini-series
2022	Once Upon a Time... Happily Never After	Mamen	Manolo Caro	TV series (6 episodes)
2023	La mesías	Laia Mayor	Javier Ambrossi & Javier Calvo	TV series (1 episode)
2023	Escort Boys	Mimi	Ruben Alves	TV series (2 episodes)

=== Music video ===
Year	Song	Artist
1992	Too Funky	George Michael
1993	I Put a Spell on You	Bryan Ferry
2008	Bruja	Orishas
2022	Amour toujours	Clara Luciani

== Theater ==
Year	Title	Author	Director	Notes
2006	Le Chanteur de Mexico	Raymond Vincy & Jesus Maria de Arozamena	Emilio Sagi	Théâtre du Châtelet
2016	The Threepenny Opera	Bertolt Brecht & Kurt Weill	Damiano Michieletto	Piccolo Teatro di Milano
2017–18	Le Chanteur de Mexico	Raymond Vincy & Jesus Maria de Arozamena	Emilio Sagi	Lausanne Opera

== Awards and nominations ==
Year	Award	Category	Nominated work	Result
1988	Association of Latin Entertainment Critics	Best Supporting Actress	Women on the Verge of a Nervous Breakdown	Nominated
1993	Association of Latin Entertainment Critics	Best Supporting Actress	Kika	Won
1993	Goya Awards	Best Supporting Actress	Kika	Nominated
1993	Spanish Actors Union	Supporting Performance	Kika	Nominated
1995	Goya Awards	Best Supporting Actress	The Flower of My Secret	Nominated
1995	Spanish Actors Union	Supporting Performance	The Flower of My Secret	Nominated
1998	Locarno International Film Festival	Special Prize for acting	Hors jeu	Won
2013	Feroz Awards	Best Supporting Actress in a Film	Three Many Weddings	Nominated
2015	Gaudí Awards	Best Actress in a Supporting Role	Spy Time	Nominated
2016	CEC Awards	Best Supporting Actress	Julieta	Nominated
2016	Feroz Awards	Best Supporting Actress in a Film	Julieta	Nominated
2017	Gasparilla International Film Festival	Grand Jury Prize – Best Performance	Madame	Won
2017	Finalmente Club's Performing Arts Award			Won
