= Marilyn Lima =

French actress (born 1995)

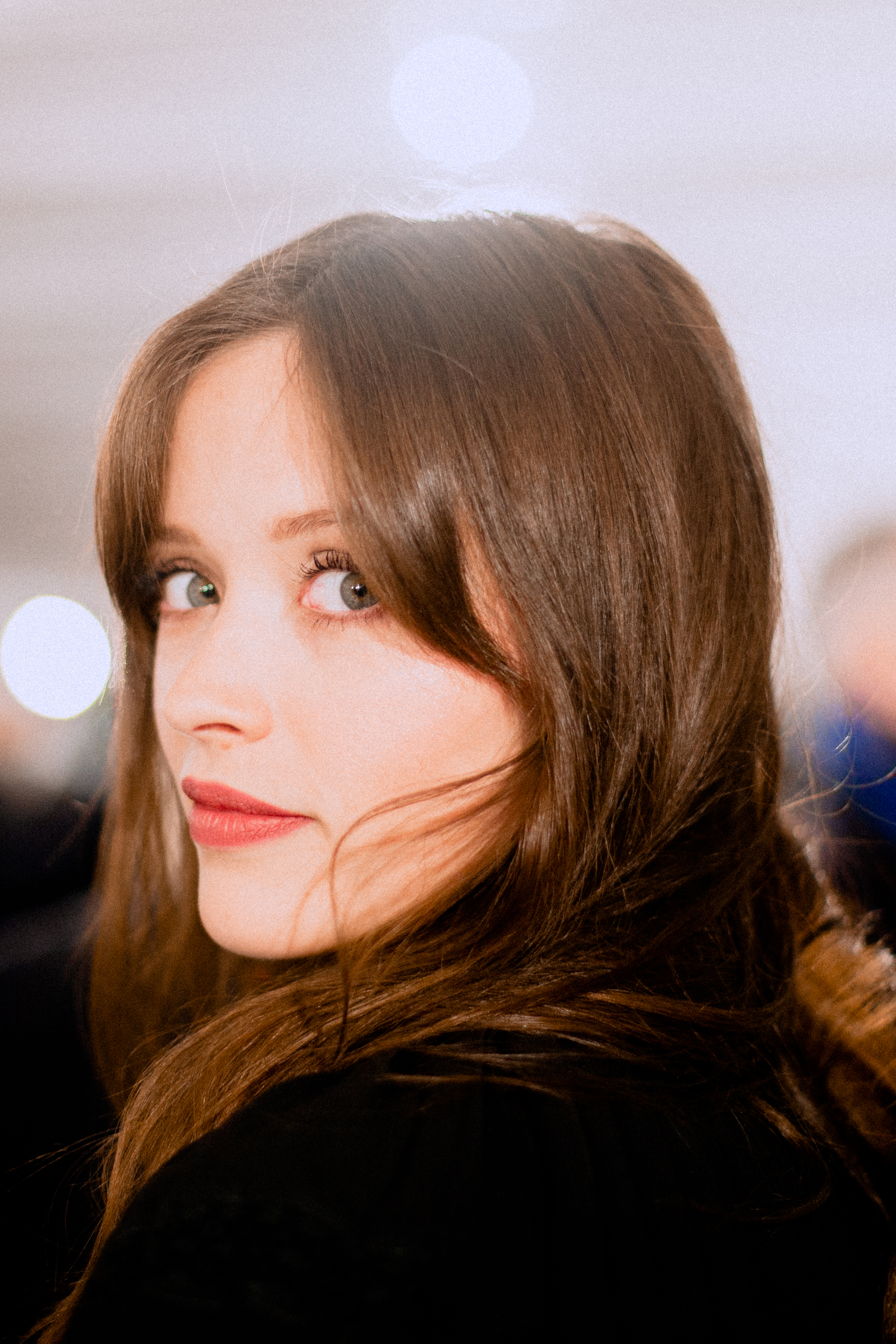
- Lima in 2020
- Born: Marilyn Lima; 28 September 1995 (age 30); Bordeaux, France
- Occupation: Actress
- Years active: 2015–present

Marilyn Lima (born 28 September 1995) is a French actress known for her roles in A Mermaid in Paris (2020), Bang Gang (A Modern Love Story) (2015), Skam France (2018–2020) and J'ai menti (2021).

== Career ==
Lima is originally from Bordeaux. Director Eva Husson discovered her Tumblr blog and, after an informal meeting at a café, chose Lima to play the character of George in her film Bang Gang (A Modern Love Story) (2015). Lima had no formal acting training.

Lima continued her career on television with the TV movie Entre deux mères (2016) (“Between two mums”) and Frank Bellocq's Des jours meilleurs (2017). In 2017, she was chosen to play Manon Demissy in the French adaptation of Skam.

On 23 April 2019 she announced, via Instagram, that she would be in the music video for DJ Petit Biscuit's song "We Were Young" featuring JP Cooper. On 5 November 2019 she announced, via Instagram, that she was filming for Julien Leclercq's Sentinelle. It was released on Netflix on 5 March 2021.

Screen Daily reported that Lima had been cast along with Nicolas Duvauchelle in A Mermaid in Paris, Mathias Malzieu's directorial debut based on his novel of the same name. The film secured a theatrical release on 11 March 2020, but was interrupted by the COVID-19 pandemic. When theatres began reopening following the initial stay-at-home order, the film was re-released on 22 June.

On 28 September 2020 FranceTV Pro announced that Lima was cast as Pauline in a mini-series called J'ai menti (“I lied”). Filming began in early September and concluded in December. The program aired on France 2 in August 2021.

On 8 September 2021 Coulisses TV announced that Lima was cast as Kimmy in a TV film remake of Constance aux enfers (1963), directed by Gaël Morel and starring Miou-Miou as Constance and Salim Kechiouche as Amine, Kimmy's boyfriend. Filming began in September 2021.

In 2022, Lima joined the team of Frank Bellocq (whom she'd previously worked with for Soda tele-series Des jours meilleurs) for a new tele-series called @venir, starring Kev Adams and Natacha Lindinger. Filming began August 2022 and wrapped later that year, while the broadcast premiered in February 2023 on TF1.

In January 2023, Lima began filming for a new project titled Brigade Anonymes. In March 2023, Lima was cast in a sci-fi series called Bugarach where she would play Emilie, a young university student investigating her father's mysterious death. In July 2023, Lima traveled to Tahiti to film for an upcoming horror-thriller movie titled Maraé. She is set to star as Alicia, one of four surfers who travel to Tahiti in their search to capture the perfect wave.

== Personal life ==
Lima is the youngest of three sisters. In an interview with Constellation magazine, she said that in her free time, she pursues her love of photography, which she has enjoyed since the early 2010s. She owns about 40 cameras, favoring her 35mm Pentax and Nikon models.

At the end of 2017, she started dating Michel Biel, whom she met while filming the series Skam France, and in which Biel played her onscreen boyfriend Charles Munier.

== Activism ==
One of Marilyn Lima's more passionate endeavors is combatting climate change. In her modeling, she chooses to work with brands whose values are in line with hers when it comes to climate change, ethical fashion and fabric sourcing. In January 2020, Marilyn walked the runway for Chaussettes Orphelines, a Parisian-based clothing brand committed to promoting ecological fashion and recycling worn clothes to combat textile pollution. Since 2020, Lima has modeled for Jolie Momes, a French lingerie brand that operates eco-responsibly by limiting their production lines to already-existing and locally sourced fabric stocks, and using green packaging for all purchases. Lima promotes environmental groups Project Rescue Ocean and YouthForClimate on her Instagram and her website. and she works alongside Plastic Free Ibiza, IbizaPreservation, and Project Rescue Ocean by running beach clean-up sites in the Basque region of France and Spain.

== Filmography ==
=== Film ===
Year	Title	Role	Notes
2014	What Doesn't Kill You, Makes You Strange	Girl	Short film
2015	Bang Gang (A Modern Love Story)	George	
2016	Lena	Lena	Short film
2017	Grain de poussière	Louise	Short film
2019	Plus jamais je ne t'aimerai	Marilyn	Short film
2020	A Mermaid in Paris	Lula	
2021	Sentinelle	Tania	Streaming film
2024	Maraé	Alicia	

=== Television ===
Year	Title	Role	Notes
2016	Entre deux mères	Alice (Lorie)	TV movie
2017	Des jours meilleurs	Charlie	11 episodes
2018–2020	Skam France	Manon Demissy	37 episodes
2019	ConneXion intime	Luna	TV movie
2021	J'ai menti	Pauline Layrac	6 episodes, Mini-series
2022	Capitaine Marleau	Magali Lenoir	1 episode
2022	Constance aux Enfers	Kimmy	TV movie
2023	Le Meilleur d'Entre Nous	Manon Mandrillon	4 episodes, Mini-series
2023	@venir	Eva Sax	6 episodes
2024	Bugarach	Emilie Ferrer	8 episodes
2024	Brigade Anonymes	Charlie	4 episodes, Mini-series

=== Music videos ===
Year	Title	Artist
2015	"Medulla"	GRS Club
2016	"Ocean Sun"	BENGALE
2017	"Blade Down" feat. Tessa B.	Synapson
2018	"Million Years"	Hugo Barriol
2019	"Bloody Mary"	Baptiste W. Hamon
2019	"Bonnie"	Odezenne
2019	"We Were Young" feat. JP Cooper	Petit Biscuit
2021	"Cashmere & rubies"	Neil Ferry
