= Bang Gang (A Modern Love Story) =

2015 film

- Theatrical release poster
- Directed by: Eva Husson
- Written by: Eva Husson
- Produced by: Didar Domehri; Laurent Baudens; Gaël Nouaille
- Starring: Finnegan Oldfield
- Cinematography: Mattias Troelstrup
- Edited by: Emilie Orsini
- Music by: White Sea
- Distributed by: Ad Vitam Distribution
- Release dates: 26 August 2015 (Festival du Film Francophone d'Angoulême); 13 January 2016 (France)
- Running time: 98 minutes
- Country: France
- Language: French
- Budget: $2.3 million
- Box office: $220,000

Bang Gang (A Modern Love Story) (French: Bang Gang (une histoire d'amour moderne)) is a French drama film directed by Eva Husson. It was shown in the Platform section of the 2015 Toronto International Film Festival. It is Husson's directorial debut.

== Plot ==
In Biarritz, teenager Alex temporarily lives alone (and later with his best friend Nikita) while his mother is abroad for work. In his house, he organizes sex parties (called bang gangs) with other teenagers, also including recreational drug use. Videos of the parties are posted on a password-protected website. A girl named George and her best friend Laetitia are active participants of the parties. George does not like that Laetitia has sex with Alex, with whom George had sex first. Gabriel does not like to attend the parties at first, but finally goes to one to have sex with George, in a separate room. Sexually transmitted infections, a teenage pregnancy and unintended posting of the videos on YouTube make the parties known to parents and other authorities, after which they are discontinued. Gabriel and George are concerned about publicized sex videos of George. Gabriel finds the boy who posted them and forces him to remove them. The infections are easily treated. The pregnant girl has an abortion. George and Gabriel start a regular relationship.

== Cast ==
- Finnegan Oldfield as Alex
- Marilyn Lima as George
- Daisy Broom as Laetitia
- Fred Hotier as Nikita
- Lorenzo Lefebvre as Gabriel

== Production ==
Principal photography began on 11 August 2014 in Biarritz. The film was shot between Biarritz, Anglet and Landes. It wrapped on 5 October.

== Reception ==
=== Critical response ===
On Rotten Tomatoes the film has an approval rating of 67% based on reviews from 36 critics, with an average rating of 6/10. On Metacritic the film has a score of 53 out of 100, based on 13 critics, indicating "mixed or average reviews".

Peter Debruge of Variety wrote: "The lack of a single clear character with whom to identify ultimately proves problematic." Boyd van Hoeij of The Hollywood Reporter wrote: "Originality or insight aren’t very high on the priority list of this drama."

=== Accolades ===
Year	Award	Category	Recipient	Result
2015	Les Arcs European Film Festival	Crystal Arrow	Eva Husson	Nominated
2015	BFI London Film Festival	First Feature Competition	Eva Husson	Nominated
2015	Toronto International Film Festival	Platform Prize	Eva Husson	Nominated
