= La Mécanique du cœur (novel) =

2007 book written by Mathias Malzieu

La mécanique du cœur
- Author: Mathias Malzieu
- Cover artist: Joann Sfar
- Language: French
- Genre: Romantic fantasy
- Publisher: Flammarion
- Publication date: October 2007
- Media type: Paperback
- Pages: 178
- ISBN: 978-2-0812-0816-2
- OCLC: 421701245
- Preceded by: Maintenant qu'il fait tout le temps nuit sur toi

La Mécanique du cœur (English version: The Boy with the Cuckoo-Clock Heart) is a book written by Mathias Malzieu, lead singer of the French rock band Dionysos (who have recorded a concept album based upon the story). The book has sold well in Malzieu's native France.

== Synopsis ==
The book opens in Edinburgh, Scotland in 1874. Little Jack is born on the coldest day ever, which causes his heart to be frozen solid, requiring a replacement. The makeshift Doctor, Madeleine, who provides midwifery and medical services to the poor and the desperate of Edinburgh, grafts a cuckoo clock to his heart of flesh and blood in order to save it. Due to Madeleine's "clientele" the children that she delivers are sometimes unwanted, and so she puts them up for adoption to good parents. Unfortunately, nobody wants Jack because of his strange clock heart, and so he ends up living with Madeleine as his adoptive mother.

She tells Jack that his clock heart is weak and so to avoid premature death, he must obey three golden rules: Never touch the hands of the clock, control his anger, and never fall in love. Life is relatively happy and carefree for a while as Jack lives with Madeleine in her surgery/workshop and is befriended by two 'working girls' named Anna and Luna. However, one day, he does fall in love; With a street singer named Miss Acacia, who takes a liking to him. Against Madeleine's initial wishes Jack demands that he be enrolled in the local school in order to receive an education, but his real motive is to look for, and hopefully be reunited with, Miss Acacia. At the school Jack doesn't find her but he does come across Joe, who becomes Jack's tormentor. Joe bullies him relentlessly until one day Jack accidentally strikes Joe in the eye with his clock, blinding him. Jack escapes the authorities and decides to travel all the way to Andalusia, where he's heard that Miss Acacia was now living. Whilst on this journey he encounters 'Jack the ripper' on a train and is nearly killed by him, only just escaping. Eventually he arrives in Paris and looks for someone who can properly readjust his clock heart. He meets a mechanically minded filmmaker named Georges Méliès, who performs the repairs and decides to travel to Andalusia with Jack for the attempt to reunite Jack with Miss Acacia.

Upon eventually arriving in Andalusia Jack finds Miss Acacia, who is now singing on stage in an amusement park, while Jack gains employment as a 'scarer' on the ghost train. He is not particularly successful at scaring people but becomes very popular as a figure of benevolent amusement. Life is very good for Jack for a while, as his romance with Miss Acacia blossoms and they become closer. During this time Jack is communicating with Madeleine, Anna and Luna in Edinburgh by means of a homing pigeon, and it is in one of these messages that he learns that Madeleine has died. One day Joe appears at the park. He tells Jack that he is in love with Miss Acacia and that's why he bullied Jack at school. Furthermore, Joe reveals that he has come to Andalusia to reclaim her. Joe immediately takes Jack's job as the ghost train 'scarer' as the owner sees Joe as being far more convincing in the role than Jack. Joe then starts the process of trying to reclaim Miss Acacia and reveals to her that Jack was responsible for the injury to his eye. Miss Acacia confronts Jack with this and a heated argument breaks out between the two of them. Miss Acacia accusing Jack of being a dishonest scoundrel and Jack claiming that she neither understands him nor fully comprehends how much he loves her. In a mixture of anger, frustration, and fear of losing Miss Acacia, Jack attempts to tear out his clock heart with his bare hands. He breaks the hands of the clock and feels an intense pain. There is also a rivulet of blood from his chest as he passes out.

Jack wakes up some time later in a bed with the figure of a woman beside him. His broken clock heart is on the bedside table and Jack's chest contains a new, more modern and quieter, clock heart that Méliès has installed to replace the broken one. Jack learns that three years have passed since he broke his original clock and slipped in to a coma. Méliès has returned to Paris and the woman by Jack's bed is one of Méliès' past lovers who decided to stay and look after Jack whilst he was unconscious. Furthermore, she reveals that Méliès has written a book about Jack and their adventures together. Unfortunately, this book contains a very disturbing claim. Méliès states that Jack's clock heart was entirely unnecessary and the fact that Jack thought it was required for his survival provided a curious fascination for Méliès. This news is initially incomprehensible and disturbing to Jack as he is torn between his disbelief at this and his knowledge of Méliès to be honest and trustworthy. Jack's confusion and self-doubt are soon short-lived, however, as he slowly regains his memories and begins thinking again of Miss Acacia.

Jack discovers that the three years he spent in a coma have transformed him from a teenager in to a young man. He has grown taller, his features have become more rugged and he now has a beard. He barely recognizes himself in the mirror and decides to use this as a means to subtly reacquaint himself with Miss Acacia. He dresses himself in one of Méliès' old suits and a hat and goes back to the amusement park, where he finds that Miss Acacia is still singing on the stage and Joe is still working on the ghost train. He also discovers that he has a grave and that everyone thinks he died the night he tried to tear out his heart. As he is no longer recognizable as his previous self Jack is able to develop a new friendship with Miss Acacia and they even begin lightly flirting with each other. After several weeks Jack decides that he's going to reveal his true self to Miss Acacia and take her back from Joe. As part of this plan he decides to make her a present of his old broken clock heart, and wraps it up in a box.

Upon their meeting Miss Acacia sees the box and is very hesitant. She explains that she can't accept a present from him because she's already in love and cannot be with anyone else. Jack is downcast and replies that he knows that she is in love with Joe, to which Miss Acacia says that it's not Joe that she is in love with but a former lover called Jack who died three years ago. With a feeling of confusion and elation Jack hands her the box and asks her to take it and open it anyway. When she sees the clock Jack expects her to be joyous at their reunion but instead, at finally realizing who he is, she regards him with a cold anger and tells Jack that because of him she has married a man she does not love (Joe) and that she has put flowers on his grave every day for three years. She tells Jack that as far as she is concerned he no longer exists. She looks through him without emotion and walks away. The book ends with Jack realizing that he has lost Miss Acacia forever.

In the epilogue it is told that Jack becomes a mere phantom of his previous self as he lives with the pain of having lost Miss Acacia for good. He travels back to Edinburgh and finally learns the truth of his clock heart from Anna and Luna. Madeleine had deliberately grafted the clock to his chest as a means of keeping him close to her, knowing that no adoptive parents would want such a strange boy and hoping that his belief that his heart could not tolerate love and anger would keep him with Madeleine and protect him from the harsh realities of life.

== Translations ==
- Chatto & Windus published an English-language translation by Sarah Ardizzone in August 2009 called The Boy with the Cuckoo-Clock Heart in the UK, and Alfred A. Knopf will publish the U.S. edition of the same in 2010
- Mondadori, Madrid, (Random House), transl. in Spanish by Vicente Tuset Mayoral, Octobre 2009: La mecánica del corazón. (Reservoir Books) ISBN 8439721951
- DEX, Istanbul, (Egmont Publishing) published a Turkish-language translation by Gülçin Şahin in August 2011 called Mekanik Kalp in Cyprus and Turkey. ISBN 9786050902723
- carl's books, München, (Random House) published a German-language translation by Sonja Finck in June 2012 called Die Mechanik des Herzens. ISBN 9783570585085

== Film adaptations ==
=== Jack and the Cuckoo-Clock Heart ===
Luc Besson has optioned the story to be made into an animated feature film that Malzieu would co-direct.

There are several notable differences between the book and the film:

In the film, Jack attempts to rip his clock out after a fight with Miss Acacia, but doesn't pass out. Instead he heads back to Edinburgh where he learns about Madeline's death. Miss Acacia follows him, since she holds the wind-up-key to his heart and without it he will die. They meet again by Madeleine's grave, where Jack throws away the key and dies after a kiss. This ending comes much quicker than in the book, Jack never goes into a coma or receives his second heart.

In the novel version, Madeleine doesn't fully remove Jack's heart. The clock is just here to help it beat. In the film version, Madeleine totally replaces Jack's heart with the clock. While the book outwardly states that the heart was only placebo, the film believes in it as genuinely as Jack himself and leaves more to interpretation.

=== Le distributeur d'aurore boréale ===
Le distributeur d'aurore boréale— translated literally: The Aurora Borealis Distributor– was a 2016 short film by Stéphane Landowski and Matthias Malzieu. The short follows a woman who collects cuckoo-clocks, and one day discovers one haunted by the ghost of Jack. Like many of Mathias' other projects, the short isn't a direct adaptation but features re-occurring characters such as Jack, a love interest, and an eccentric inventor.

Cast:

- Nicolas Avinée as Jack
- Lola Bessis as Lola
- Joyce Bibring as Lola's mother
- Mathieu Metral as the watchmaker

The 13-minute short was produced by Mon Voisin Productions and FullDawa Films, and distributed internationally by L'Agence du court métrage.

== Stage adaptation ==
While wandering through a book store, would-be director and writer of La mécanique du coeur - Le Spectacle Coralie Jayne discovered the novel, which had been a best seller for two years. Under the name "L'homme sans trucage"— "The Man Who Was no Hoax" after the book Meliez writes about Jack's life— it was first presented in October 2010 at the Festival Automnales. Four years later, with the name changed back to the book's title, it was presented again as part of Jayne's residency at Grange aux Histoires and again at Brèche in Aubervilliers. The show was still in its early workshop stage, but had gathered positive reviews.

It got its break in 2015 when it was given the chance to present at Festival D'Avignon OFF in 2015 by the company Cie le Moineau, and opportunities arose at a rapid pace. In 2016 Le Spectacle traveled to A la folie théâtre, and they returned for 33 shows in 2017.

Nicolas Avinée was now cast in the role of Jack, reprising the character after having been cast in 2016 to appear in the short Le distributeur d'aurore boréale. Malzieu himself attended a recent production, and gave his glowing words of approval to the adaption and the cast.

In 2018 the show was presented again at the Festival d'Avignon.

Several trailers and footage compilations of the show throughout its life have been found online, but no full recordings have yet surfaced— and of course, everything is in French. As far as it's known, the plot follows the book and only includes the occasional plot-relevant song, in contract to the film's featuring of the concept album.
