= Sentinelle =

2021 French film

- Directed by: Julien Leclercq
- Screenplay by: Julien Leclercq; Matthieu Serveau
- Produced by: Julien Madon
- Starring: Olga Kurylenko; Marilyn Lima; Michel Nabokoff
- Production companies: Labyrinthe Cinéma; Umedia
- Distributed by: Netflix
- Release date: 5 March 2021
- Running time: 80 minutes
- Country: France
- Language: French

Sentinelle is a 2021 French action thriller film directed by Julien Leclercq, written by Julien Leclercq and Matthieu Serveau, and starring Olga Kurylenko, Marilyn Lima and Michel Nabokoff. It is about a French soldier who has returned home from serving in the Middle East traumatized by the experience. After her sister is raped and left in a coma, she uses her military training to seek revenge on the perpetrators.

== Plot ==
Klara serves in Syria in the French Army as an interpreter for Opération Chammal. After the apprehension of a suspected terrorist, she witnesses the man's young son blow himself up at his father's behest with explosives hidden on his body. Traumatized by the blast and experiencing migraine headaches, she is transferred home to Nice and moves back in with her mother, Maria, and her sister, Tania, while serving as part of Opération Sentinelle. On patrol, her trauma manifests itself in impulsive, sometimes disproportionally violent behavior towards suspects. When her prescription painkillers run out, she begins to buy street drugs.

One night, Klara and Tania go out to a nightclub. Tania separates from Klara to join a party of Russians and signals to Klara that she is leaving with them. Klara also ends up leaving the club to have sex with a lesbian girl with whom she was dancing. The next day she is notified that Tania had been raped and savagely beaten into a coma. Klara starts her own investigation of the crime, inspects the club's security footage, finds out the name of the man Tania was with, and takes a screenshot of him. Captain Muller of the French Police, who is leading the investigation, identifies the suspect as Yvan Kadnikov, the son of Leonid Kadnikov who is an influential and well-connected Russian tycoon. Yvan is hiding out in his father's villa at Saint-Jean-Cap-Ferrat, but both have diplomatic passports and immunity, making them untouchable without a complicated legal process.

Unwilling to wait for justice, Klara catches Yvan at the nightclub and he tells her that he had not touched her sister. His friends come to his rescue and Klara is evicted after a fight with them. Later, she infiltrates Leonid's villa to find Yvan, but is captured by Leonid's bodyguards. Leonid taunts Klara, freely admitting that it was he who had raped Tania since his son was not interested in women because he was a homosexual. He leaves her to be drowned by his guards, but Klara fights free and escapes. Tania later awakens from her coma, but decides not to press charges despite Klara's urging her to do so. While outside her sister's hospital room, Klara sees a news report in which Leonid states that he will be returning to Russia soon. She notices a nurse rushing past her and right afterwards Tania has a sudden embolism. Suspecting an attempt on her sister's life, Klara pursues and catches and beats up the female assassin. Captain Muller informs Klara that she had been sent by Leonid.

Now fully bent on revenge, Klara steals several weapons from her garrison's armory and sneaks into Leonid's hideout. After killing the bodyguards, she pushes Leonid off a bannister when he tries to bribe her, and when she observes his body assumes he's been killed. Klara is stabbed by Yvan and shoots him dead. Seriously injured, she retreats as a tactical police unit arrives. Leonid, however, surprisingly survived the fall and regains consciousness.

Three months later, Leonid is in his Dubai hotel suite and asks the hostesses for room service. Disguised as one of them, Klara brings him a fruit basket, grabs a fork, and rapidly stabs Leonid several times in the jugular and around the neck. She secretly travels back to Nice to check in on Tania from a distance. Tania is hanging out with friends and has physically recovered from her ordeal. After observing Tania without her noticing and seeing that she is all right, Klara walks away, now as a fugitive from the law.

== Cast ==
- Olga Kurylenko as Klara
- Marilyn Lima as Tania
- Michel Nabokoff as Leonid Kadnikov
- Martin Swabey as Lieutenant Eric Jaubert
- Carole Weyers as Capitaine Catherine Muller
- Andrey Gorlenko as Yvan Kadnikov
- Gabriel Almaer as Armorer
- Antonia Malinova as Maria Kovalev, Klara and Tania's mother
- Blaise Afonso as Opération Sentinelle Soldier
- Guillaume Duhesme as Lieutenant Colonel
- Michel Biel as Aurélien

== Production ==
Produced by Labyrinthe Cinéma and Umedia, Sentinelle was filmed over 35 days in November and December 2019, in Brussels, Belgium, Nice, France, and Casablanca, Morocco. However, post-production was interrupted by the COVID-19 pandemic.

== Critical reception ==
On review aggregator Rotten Tomatoes, the film has a 70% rating based on reviews from 10 critics, and an average rating of 5.80/10. On the website Movie Nation, critic Roger Moore gave the film an unfavorable review, calling it a "tight but illogical skips-a step-or-three thriller". On the website The Last Thing I See, a review calls the film's plot "lean and spare, without much fat or wasted time" but praises Klara's character development. Decider reviewer Johnny Loftus says that "Sentinelle balances its beats of emotional trauma against the darker forces of vigilantism. It doesn’t forgive its main character’s drastic actions, but it illustrates...how she got there." Vulture critic Bilge Ebiri, who quips that this movie is "John Wick on the Riviera", praises the film's "lean, modest efficiency...that knows how to grab your attention and not overstay its welcome." Digital Spy reviewer Ian Sandwell gives a negative review, stating that "Sentinelle leans heavily on clichés, copious slow-motion shots and lingering silences to highlight Klara's mental state post-war", saying "[i]t's nothing we haven't seen before and contains no depth or exploration of the issues." Sandwell also states that the film gives its lead no "quirks" as a revenge-heroine, other than depicting her as not very good at her one-woman attacks; apart from this, he says "there are no other surprises in store plot-wise as events otherwise play out predictably."
