= Amanda Sthers =

French screenwriter, writer and playwright (born 1978)

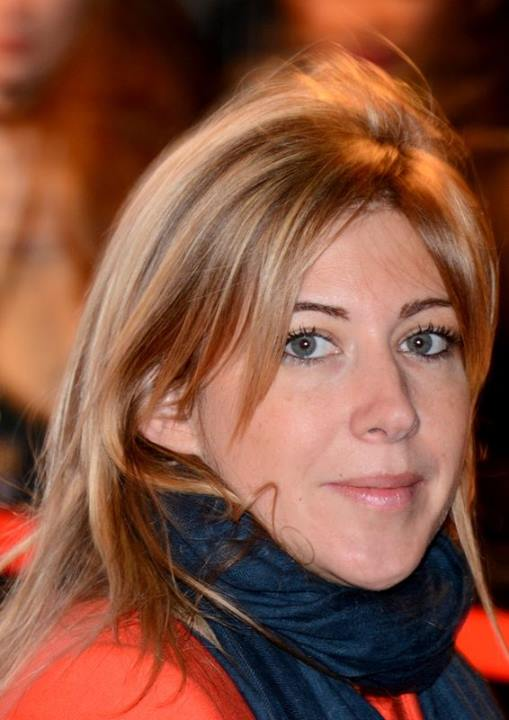
- Sthers in 2014
- Born: Amanda Queffélec-Maruani; 18 April 1978 (age 48); Paris, France
- Spouse: Patrick Bruel (m. 2004; div. 2007)
- Children: 2

Amanda Queffélec-Maruani (born 18 April 1978), known professionally as Amanda Sthers, is a French novelist, playwright, screenwriter and filmmaker.

== Biography ==
Sthers is of Tunisian Sefardi and Breton origins. She has written ten novels which have been translated in more than 14 countries.

Her first play, "Le Vieux Juif blonde" is today studied at Harvard University. Her play "Le Lien" has been performed in Paris and at the Avignon Festival in 2013, and was widely performed in Italy in 2016.

Sthers wrote and directed the movie Je vais te manquer in which she directed Carole Bouquet, Michael Lonsdale, and Mélanie Thierry.

In 2015, she wrote an adaptation of Les Terres Saintes / Holy Lands, which she later directed in English. Shooting took place during winter 2017 in Israel.

At the 2017 Zurich Film Festival, Madame, a feature film that she wrote and directed in English was screened, starring Toni Collette, Harvey Keitel, and Rossy de Palma.

== Personal life ==
On 21 September 2004, Sthers married singer and actor Patrick Bruel. The two have two children, Oscar and Léon, who was born 28 September 2005. The couple separated in 2007.

Sthers moved to Los Angeles with her two children in 2017 where she started a film production company.

== Awards and honours ==
- Sthers has been given the title of "Chevalier des Arts et des Lettres" by the French government.

== Works ==
- 2002: Caméra Café, TV series, writer
- 2004: Ma place sur la photo, novel (ISBN 2246659817)
- 2005: Chicken Street, novel (ISBN 2246690714)
- 2006: Le vieux juif blonde, play with Mélanie Thierry, directed by Jacques Weber (ISBN 2246717019)
- 2006: Le chat bleu, l’alouette et le canard timide, children book, drawings by Pierre Cornuel, Grasset Jeunesse (ISBN 2246715814)
- 2007: Thalasso, play
- 2007: Madeleine, novel
- 2007: Les pt'its legumes, children book (ISBN 978-2-916780-57-3)
- 2008: Keith Me, novel, Stock (ISBN 978-2-234-06150-7)
- 2010: Les terres saintes, novel, Stock (ISBN 9782234064225)
- 2010: Liberace, biography, Plon (ISBN 978-2259211154)
- 2011: Le carnet secret de Lili Lampion, children book, stage musical at the Théâtre de Paris
- 2012: Rompre le charme, novel, Stock
- 2012: Le lien, play
- 2013: Dans mes yeux, Johnny Hallyday biography, Plon (ISBN 978-2259218627)
- 2013: Les érections américaines, essay, Flammarion
- 2013: Mur, play
- 2015: Les promesses, novel, Grasset
- 2015: Conseil de famille, play, Théâtre de la Renaissance
- 2017: Madame, feature film, writer and director
- 2017: Holy Lands, feature film, writer and director
- 2020: Lettre d’amour sans le dire, novel, Grasset
- 2021: Promises, feature film, writer and director
- 2022: Le café suspendu, novel, Grasset
- 2023: Mafia Mamma, feature film, original story idea
