= Jacques Revaux =

French songwriter (born 1940)

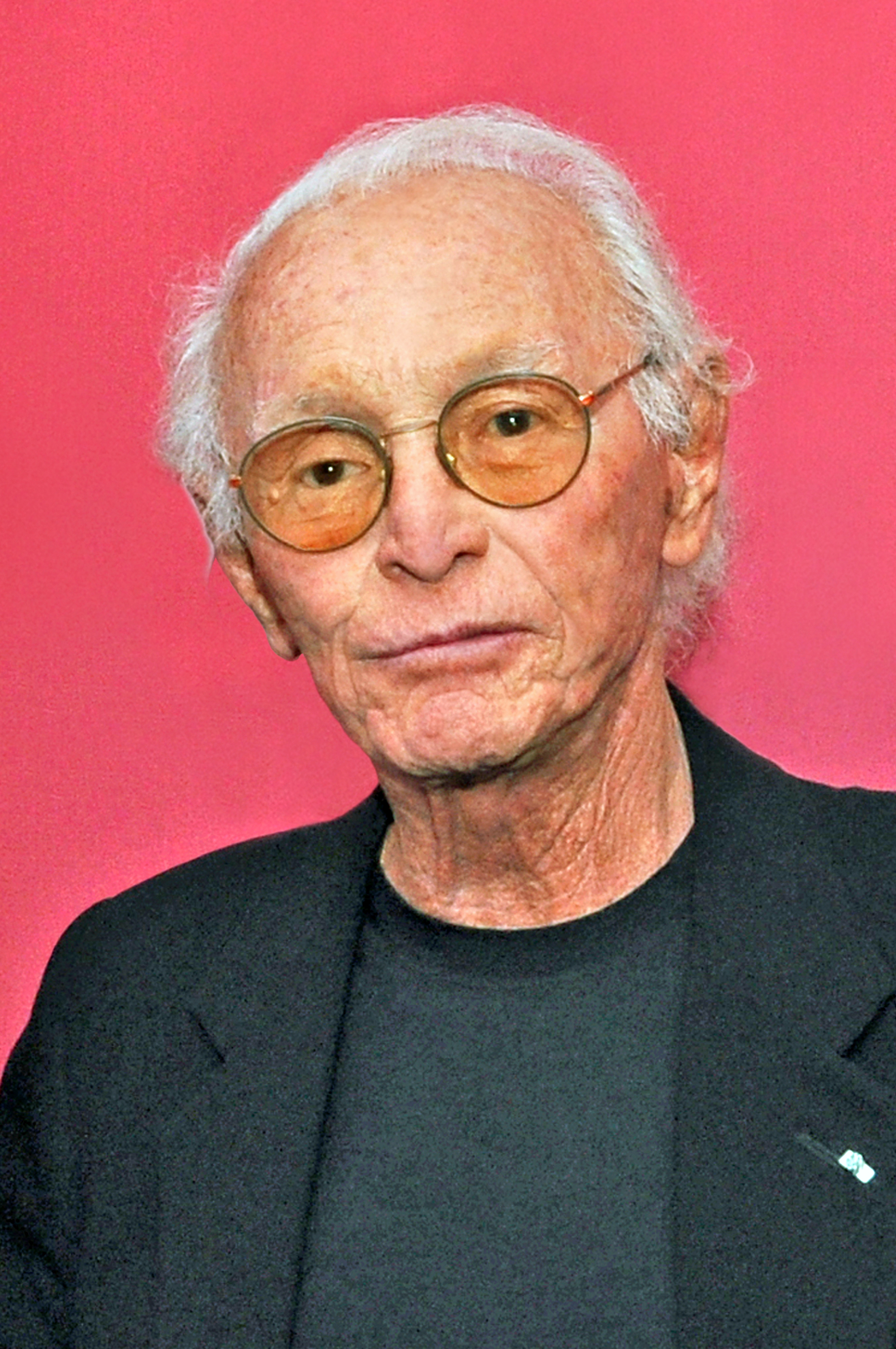
- Revaux in 2023

Background information
- Born: Jacques Abel Jules Revaud; 11 July 1940 (age 86); Azay-sur-Cher, Indre-et-Loire, France
- Genre: Pop
- Occupation: Songwriter
- Years active: 1960s–present
- Label: Trema

Jacques Abel Jules Revaud (French pronunciation: [ʒak abɛl ʒyl ʁəvo]; born 11 July 1940), known as Jacques Revaux (same pronunciation), is a French songwriter, most famous for his 1968 writing collaboration with singer Claude François on the song "Comme d'habitude", whose text was reworked by Canadian singer-songwriter Paul Anka into the English language as "My Way", which was in turn a hit first recorded by Frank Sinatra. He co-founded Trema Records with Regis Talar. Revaux also wrote many hit songs for another French singing star, Michel Sardou.
