= Etienne de Swardt =

French Perfumer

- Born: August 27, 1970 (age 55)
- Label: Etat libre d'Orange

Etienne de Swardt (born August 27, 1970 in Pretoria, Republic of South Africa), is a creator and publisher of French perfumes.

== Early life ==
Etienne de Swardt was born in 1970 to a South African father, an engineer, and a French mother, an associate professor of classical letters. In 1975, his parents left South Africa for New Caledonia. In 1993, Etienne de Swardt arrived in Paris, where he enrolled at ESSEC. After his studies, he joined LVMH in 1994 and wrote the concepts of Givenchy perfumes until 2000.

== Career as Perfume Creative Director ==
In May 2000, Etienne de Swardt launched the first line of perfumes for dogs: “Oh My Dog!" followed by "Oh My Cat!", marketed by the company Dog Generation. In 2004, he launched the perfume and body care range of the American boxing brand Everlast with the slogans “Made in Pain” and “Nothing soft comes out of the Bronx ”.

In 2006, Etienne de Swardt founded the Etat Libre d'Orange, a gallery located in Paris, where he invited perfumers to create perfumes outside the constraints and traditional codes of the industry. Etienne de Swardt wanted to create an enclave of absolute freedom and olfactory libertinism and wrote a declaration of independence which became the Orange Free State manifesto.
