= Madame (2017 film) =

- Theatrical release poster
- Directed by: Amanda Sthers
- Written by: Amanda Sthers
- Produced by: Cyril Colbeau-Justin; Jean-Baptiste Dupont; Didier Lupfer; Alain Pancrazi
- Starring: Harvey Keitel; Toni Collette; Rossy de Palma
- Cinematography: Régis Blondeau
- Edited by: Nicolas Chaudeurge
- Music by: Matthieu Gonet
- Production companies: Paris-based LGM; StudioCanal
- Distributed by: StudioCanal
- Release dates: 2 June 2017 (Zurich Film Festival); 22 November 2017 (France)
- Running time: 90 minutes
- Country: France
- Languages: English; French
- Budget: $5.5 million
- Box office: $5.4 million

Madame is a 2017 French comedy-drama film directed by Amanda Sthers. The film is a satire of the class divide in today's Paris.

== Plot ==
Anne and Bob, an American couple living in Paris, organize a dinner party and invite ten friends. Bob's son with another mother arrives by surprise and the total number of guests is now 13. The superstitious Anne asks her maid, Maria, to pretend to be a rich Spanish friend and join the table. Maria meets David, a well to do Irish art scholar. Bob’s son, who is not a fan of his stepmother Anne, tells David that Maria is actually royalty but will not admit it. They both like each other and start a relationship. When David tells Maria he knows who she really is, she believes he knows she is a maid. Anne is furious when she learns her maid has entered a relationship with David. Anne, who is also having an affair with her husband's friend is not ashamed of her own classism, is herself worried that she has outgrown her role as a younger wife and takes the blooming relationship with her friend and maid personally.

== Cast ==
- Harvey Keitel as Bob Fredericks
- Toni Collette as Anne Fredericks
- Rossy de Palma as Maria
- Michael Smiley as David Morgan
- Brendan Patricks as Toby
- Sonia Rolland as Marinette
- Stanislas Merhar as Antoine Bernard
- Sue Cann as Mandy
- Tom Hughes as Steven Fredericks
- Joséphine de La Baume as Fanny
- Ginnie Watson as Jane Millerton
- Tim Fellingham as Michael
- Violaine Gillibert as Hélène Bernard
- Alex Vizorek as Jacques
- Ariane Seguillon as Josiane
- Salomé Partouche as Gabriella

== Production ==
The film started shooting in Paris on 20 July 2016 for six weeks.

== Reception ==
On review aggregator website Rotten Tomatoes, the film has an approval rating of 44% based on 36 reviews, and an average rating of 5.42/10. The website's critics consensus reads "Madame's retrograde trappings are further weighted down by unlikable characters and an overall inability to do justice to its themes." On Metacritic, the film has a weighted average score of 45 out of 100, based on six critics, indicating "mixed or average reviews".
