= Carl's Books =

German publisher

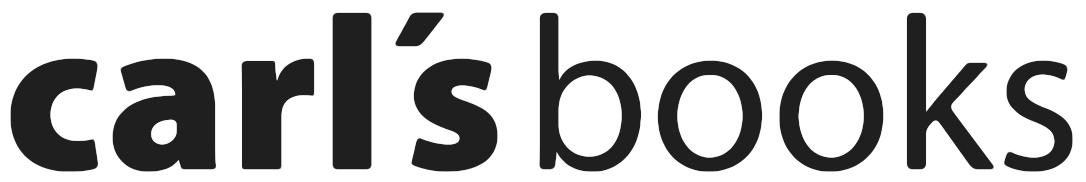
- Parent company: Random House
- Founded: 2011
- Country of origin: Germany
- Headquarters location: Munich
- Key people: Johannes Jacob
- Official website: www.randomhouse.de/Verlag/carl's-books/65000.rhd

Carl's Books (stylized as carl's books) is a German fiction publisher based in Munich. It was founded in 2011 and is part of Random House publishing group.

== History ==
The name Carl's Books refers to Carl Bertelsmann, the founder of C. Bertelsmann Publishing. The publisher purely published paperbacks and exclusively publishes original or German editions. A successful title of the first program was "The Hundred-Year-Old Man Who Climbed Out the Window and Disappeared" by Jonas Jonasson. The novel was published on September 1, 2011, in German, became a best seller and by the end of 2014, alone in Germany, sold more than two million copies. In Switzerland, this novel was also first place of the bestseller list for more than a year. The second novel by Jonas Jonasson, "Die Analphabetin, die rechnen konnte", was released on November 15, 2013, and had similar success. In addition, the program of Carl's Books includes, for example, the novel "Verschwiegen" by William Landay, and "Der Tod fährt Audi", the first German translated novel by Kristian Bang Foss. Until the end of 2014, a total of 45 titles from authors such as Christian v. Ditfurth, Daniel Depp, Mathias Malzieu, Tonino Benacquista and Vina Jackson were released.
