= État libre d'Orange =

French perfume brand

État libre d'Orange is a French brand of perfumes created in 2006 by Etienne de Swardt. The fragrance company created for the brand is Éditions des Sens.

== Etymology ==
In French, the État libre d'Orange is the name of the Orange Free State, an independent Boer sovereign republic in southern Africa during the second half of the 19th century, and later a British colony and a province of the Union of South Africa.

== Visual identity ==
The logo is a blue-white-red cockade over a white disc.

Every flask is identical, the only variants being the color, name, and embellishments surrounding the logo.
