= Monsters in Love =

Studio album by Dionysos
- Released: 29 August 2005
- Recorded: 2005, Moles Studio, Bath
- Genre: Rock, art rock
- Label: Barclay, Universal Music
- Producer: John Parish

Dionysos chronology
Western sous la neige (2002)	Monsters in Love (2005)	La mécanique du cœur (2007)

Professional ratings
Review scores
Source	Rating
RFI Musique	(not rated)

Monsters in Love is the fifth studio album by the French rock band Dionysos, released 29 August 2005 and produced by John Parish. The album features songs in both English and French.

== Background ==
This album was written by the band's lead singer after the death of his mother. A lot of the songs and characters began as short stories which he was writing to help deal with his bereavement. A book by the lead singer also accompanies the album: Maintenant qu'il fait tout le temps nuit sur toi.

There has also been a live album and DVD released (Monsters in Live) featuring many of the songs that appear on this album.

== Track listing ==
All songs: music and lyrics by Dionysos, except where stated

1. "Giant Jack's theme"
2. "Giant Jack"
3. "La métamorphose de Mister Chat"
4. "L'homme qui pondait des œufs"
5. "Broken bird"
6. "Miss Acacia"
7. "Le retour de Bloody Betty"
8. "Mon ombre est personne"
9. "I love Liou"
10. "Lips story in a chocolate river"
11. "Giant John et le sanglophone"
12. "Tes lacets sont des fées"
13. "Old child"
14. "Monsters in love"
15. "Midnight letter"
16. "Neige" + hidden track "I did acid with Caroline"

== Personnel ==
=== The band ===
Mathias Malzieu – vocals, acoustic guitar
Mike Ponton – guitar
Eric Serra-Tosio – drums, percussion
Élisabeth Maistre – violin, vocals
Stéphan Bertholio – keys, musical saw, melodica, glockenspiel, banjo

=== Guests ===
The Kills – vocals on "Old child"

=== Additional musicians ===
Sophie Whitehead – 'claquettes' (on "Le retour de Bloody Betty")
Silke Volland – violin and string arrangements
Tobias Unterberg – cello
Yvonne Fechner – violin (on "Broken bird", "Mon ombre est personne", "Monsters in love" and "I love Liou")
Bethany Porter – cello (on "Giant John et le sanglophone")
John Parish – tambourine (on "La métamorphose de Mister Chat" and "Broken bird"), maracas (on "Le retour de Bloody Betty), glockenspiel (on "L'homme qui pondait de œufs" and "La métamorphose de Mister Chat"), spoken word (on "Giant John et le sanglophone")
David Vernon – brass arrangements
Mike Daden – trombone (on "Tes lacets sont des fées")
Dolan Jones – trumpet (on "Tes lacets sont des fées")
Dan Jones – tuba (on "Tes lacets sont des fées")

=== Production ===
Produced and mixed by John Parish
Sound engineer Paul Corkett
Assistant Nick Joplin
Mastered by John Dent at Loud Mastering
