= Tréma (record label) =

Defunct French record label

Tréma was a record and video label founded in 1969 by Jacques Revaux and Régis Talar. The word tréma was an acronym for Talar Revaux Éditions Musicales Associées.

== History ==
Tréma was initially created to publish the recordings of Michel Sardou, whose parents used to buy meat from the parents of Jacques Revaux, but various other artists also joined it, such as Animo, Richard Anthony, Charles Aznavour, Pierre Billon, Carlos, Dani, Jean-Jacques Debout, Michel Delpech, Dionysos, Frédéric François, Michel Fugain, Pierre Groscolas, Michel Kricorian, Catherine Lara, Enrico Macias, Didier Marouani, K-Reen, Matmatah, Alexandra Roos, Patrick Topaloff, Serge Reggiani, and Hervé Vilard. Liz Mitchell (lead singer of Boney M) also has 3 singles and an album issued by the company in the late 80s, No one will force you (album) and "Get on up and dance" (promo 12inch single), "Marinero" (12'inch single promo) & Single Marinero b/w "Times is a river". Michel Sardou, by himself, made up 80% of the sales of the label.

The label was bought by Universal Music France in 2004.
