= Olivia Ruiz =

French singer

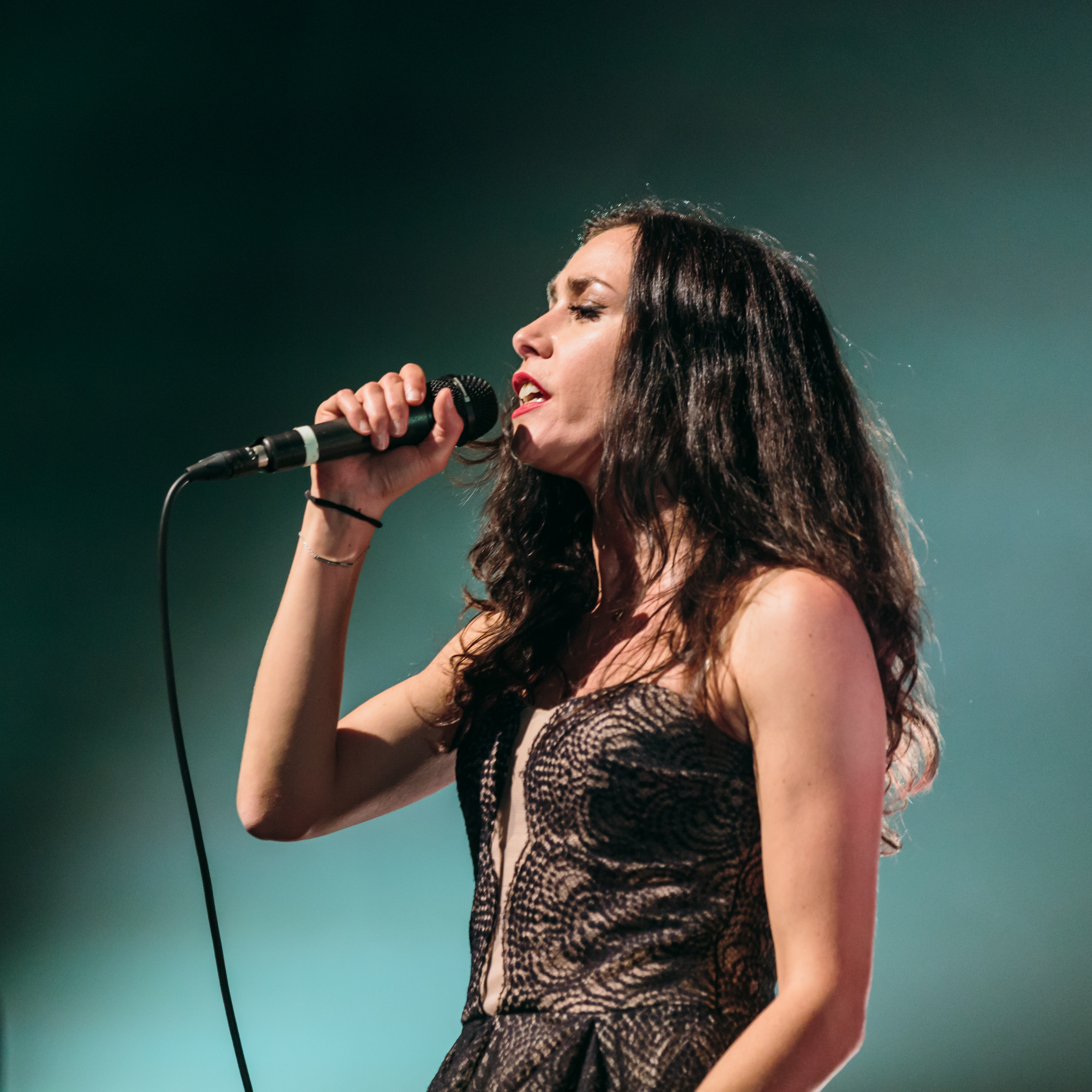

Background information
- Born: Olivia Blanc; 1 January 1980 (age 46); Carcassonne, Aude, France
- Genres: Nouvelle chanson
- Occupation: Singer
- Years active: 2001–present
- Label: Polydor
- Website: olivia-ruiz.com

Olivia Blanc (born 1 January 1980), known as Olivia Ruiz, is a French pop singer belonging to the nouvelle chanson genre. She gained fame after reaching the semi-finals of the French Star Academy series in 2001.

== Biography ==
Ruiz was born 1 January 1980 in Carcassonne, the daughter of musician Didier Blanc, though later taking her grandmother's maiden name, Ruiz. Her family on her mother's side is Spanish and fled Nationalist Spain to go to Marseillette, in the village's concert hall (subject of her second album). She has a brother, Anthony, born in 1985. He is a rap composer known by the nickname Toan. She studied in Carcassonne but went to college in Montpellier, where she studied performing arts, before changing to a BTS in communication.

At the age of 15, Ruiz started getting involved in music. She left her parents' house to live with her aunt in Narbonne, where she took theater and dance classes with her friends from Comigne, the band Rock Five. Together, they did some opening acts in order to make some money by singing the Cranberries' or Lenny Kravitz's songs. She also took dance classes at the Pelizzon School in Carcassonne and Trèbes. She entered the Médiévales de Carcassonne, a group of small artists, for their summer show. She started performing in different bars, along with Frank Marty (from the bands THC, Les Croquants and La Varda) a multi-instrumentalist from Narbonne. They mainly performed songs from old artists like Fréhel, Yves Montand and Gilbert Bécaud, but also songs from the new generation and Spanish standards.

In 2001, she was a prominent contestant in the first French edition of Star Academy, a popular TV reality show and musical contest. She was defeated in the semi-final by eventual winner Jenifer Bartoli but according to an interview on Europe 1 she claimed that she never wanted to win and, following a post-series tour, worked to distance herself from the Star Ac image.

For her second studio album La Femme Chocolat, Olivia Ruiz was recognised by the Victoires de la Musique as the Female Artist of the Year in 2007. For the live performances accompanying the record, she also received the prize in the category of Musical Show, Tour or Concert of the Year. The album topped the French chart and was certified as a diamond record for selling more than 750,000 copies in France and made it to the top 50 of the Walloon and Swiss charts. Off the album, the music videos of the tracks "J'traine des pieds" and "La femme chocolat" were placed on rotation on the MCM French TV channel in 2006. The singles made it to the top 50 of the French and Walloon charts.

Olivia Ruiz wrote all the lyrics for her third studio album Miss Météores, co-orchestrated the music and employed a crew of guest stars including the rapper Buck 65, the indie band Noisettes and the folk and dark cabaret project Lonely Drifter Karen and featured the styles of nouvelle chanson, punk, folk and Hispanic rock. The record topped the French and Walloon album charts in 2009. Off the album, the single "Elle panique", with the music written by Buck 65 peaked at #2 of the Walloon chart. The music video of the song was placed on rotation on the MCM in May 2009. Her ex-partner is Mathias Malzieu, the lead singer of the band Dionysos.

During an interview, Ruiz said that she did not want to "stuff people" with her music and preferred waiting at least two years before releasing a new studio album. From August to October 2011, she shared the screen with Gérard Jugnot and François Berléand in Un jour mon père viendra, a French movie by Martin Valente. She also participated in the project Les Françoise, with Jeanne Cherhal, Emily Loizeau, Camille, La Grande Sophie and Rosemary Standley (from the band Moriarty).

During an interview for L'Express, Ruiz said that she started recording her fourth album after going to Cuba alone to take a break. The title of her album is Le calme et la tempête. It was released on 3 December 2012. This album was also a success with 150 000 copies sold.

In February 2013, she won her third Globes de Cristal Award as the Female Artist of the Year. (2007, 2010, 2013).

In October 2013, she played Candela, the gypsy in L'Amour sorcier, a ballet d'action written by Manuel de Falla in 1915.

In May 2014, she announced that her fifth studio album would be released by the end of 2014 or the beginning of 2015. However, the album, entitled À Nos Corps-Aimants, was released on 18 November 2016.

== Discography ==
=== Albums ===
- 2003 : J'aime pas l'Amour, produced by Iso Diop & Mitch Olivier
- 2005 : La Femme Chocolat, produced by Alain Cluzeau, Mathias Malzieu (Dionysos) & Olivia Ruiz
- 2007 : Chocolat Show
- 2008 : La Chica Chocolate (La femme chocolat)
- 2009 : Miss Météores
- 2010 : Miss Météores Live
- 2012 : Le Calme et La Tempête
- 2016 : À nos Corps-Aimants

=== Singles ===
- 2001 : Gimme! Gimme! Gimme! (A Man After Midnight) - an ABBA cover sung by a group of Star Academy contestants including Ruiz and Jenifer Bartoli that reached No 1 in the French charts
- 2002 : Paris, songwriter Chet.
- 2003 : J'aime pas l'amour, songwriter Juliette.
- 2003 : Pas si vieille, songwriter Philippe Prohom.
- 2003 : Qui sommes nous ?, songwriter Chet and Jérôme Rebotier.
- 2004 : Le tango du qui, songwriter Stéphane Balmino and Denis Hénault-Parizel.
- 2004 : Les vieux amoureux, songwriter Chet and Jérôme Rebotier.
- 2005 : J'traîne des pieds, songwriter Olivia Ruiz and Ben Ricour.
- 2006 : La femme chocolat, songwriter Mathias Malzieu.
- 2007 : Non dits, songwriter Christian Olivier.
- 2007 : Goutez-moi, songwriter Mathias Malzieu.
- 2007 : Thérapie de Groupe
- 2008 : Bunny Maloney with Mathias Malzieu for the TV series of the same name.
- 2009 : Elle panique
- 2009 : Belle a en crever
- 2010 : Les crêpes aux champignons
- 2010 : Elle panique (Live)
- 2012 : My Lomo & Me (Je photographie des gens heureux)
- 2012 : Volver
- 2016 : Mon Corps, Mon Amour
- 2023 : La Réplique
- 2024 : Le Sel

=== DVDs ===
- 2007 : Chocolat Show (Live)
- 2010 : Miss Météores (Live)

== Charts ==
=== Albums ===
| Year | Title | Chart positions | | | Sales and certifications |
| Year | Title | BEL (WA) | FRA | SWI | Sales and certifications |
|---|---|---|---|---|---|
| 2001 | Star Academy, L'Album | 1 | 1 | 3 | Ruiz appears as one of the Star Academy team |
| 2001 | Star Academy, Le Live | 7 | 16 | 38 | Live versions of the Star Academy songs, Ruiz sings Paris |
| 2003 | J'aime pas l'amour | 95 | 87 | – | Silver record (more than 50,000 sold) in France |
| 2005 | La Femme Chocolat | 6 | 1 | 33 | Diamond record (more than 750,000 sold) in France |
| 2007 | Chocolat Show! | 40 | 54 | – | Live Album |
| 2008 | La Chica Chocolate | 60 | 185 | – | La Femme Chocolat rerecorded in Spanish |
| 2009 | Miss Météores | 1 | 1 | 7 | Over 400,000 copies sold |
| 2012 | Olivia Sings for the Red Star | – | 170 | – | |
| 2012 | Le calme et la tempête | 17 | 14 | 51 | 100,000 copies sold |
| 2016 | À nos corps-aimants | 58 | 29 | | |
| 2024 | La réplique | 28 | — | | |

=== Singles ===
| Year | Single | Peak positions | | | Album |
| Year | Single | BEL (WA) | FRA | SWI | Album |
|---|---|---|---|---|---|
| 2001 | "Gimme! Gimme! Gimme! (A Man After Midnight)" | 11 | 1 | – | as Star Ac 1 with Jenifer Bartoli and Carine Haddadou |
| 2007 | "La Femme Chocolat" | 31 | 42 | – | La Femme Chocolat |
| 2007 | "J'traîne des pieds" | 23 | 37 | – | La Femme Chocolat |
| 2009 | "Elle panique" | 2 | – | 74 | Miss Météores |
| 2009 | "Belle à en crever" | 63 | – | – | Miss Météores |
| 2010 | "Les crêpes aux champignons" | 22 | – | – | Miss Météores |
| 2012 | "My Lomo & Me" | 50 | 184 | – | Le calme et la tempête |
| 2016 | "Mon corps mon amour" | – | 116 | – | À nos corps-aimants |
