= Dionysos (French band) =

French band

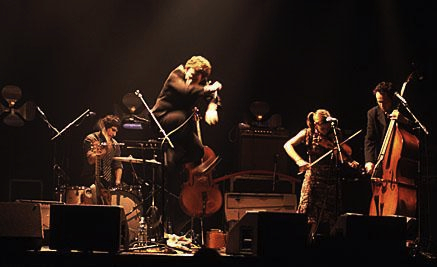

Background information
- Origin: Valence France
- Genres: Rock, art rock
- Years active: 1993–present
- Labels: Barclay, Universal
- Members: Mathias Malzieu; Éric Serra Tosio; Michaël Ponton; Guillaume Garidel; Élisabeth Maistre; Stéphan Bertholio
- Website: dionyweb.com

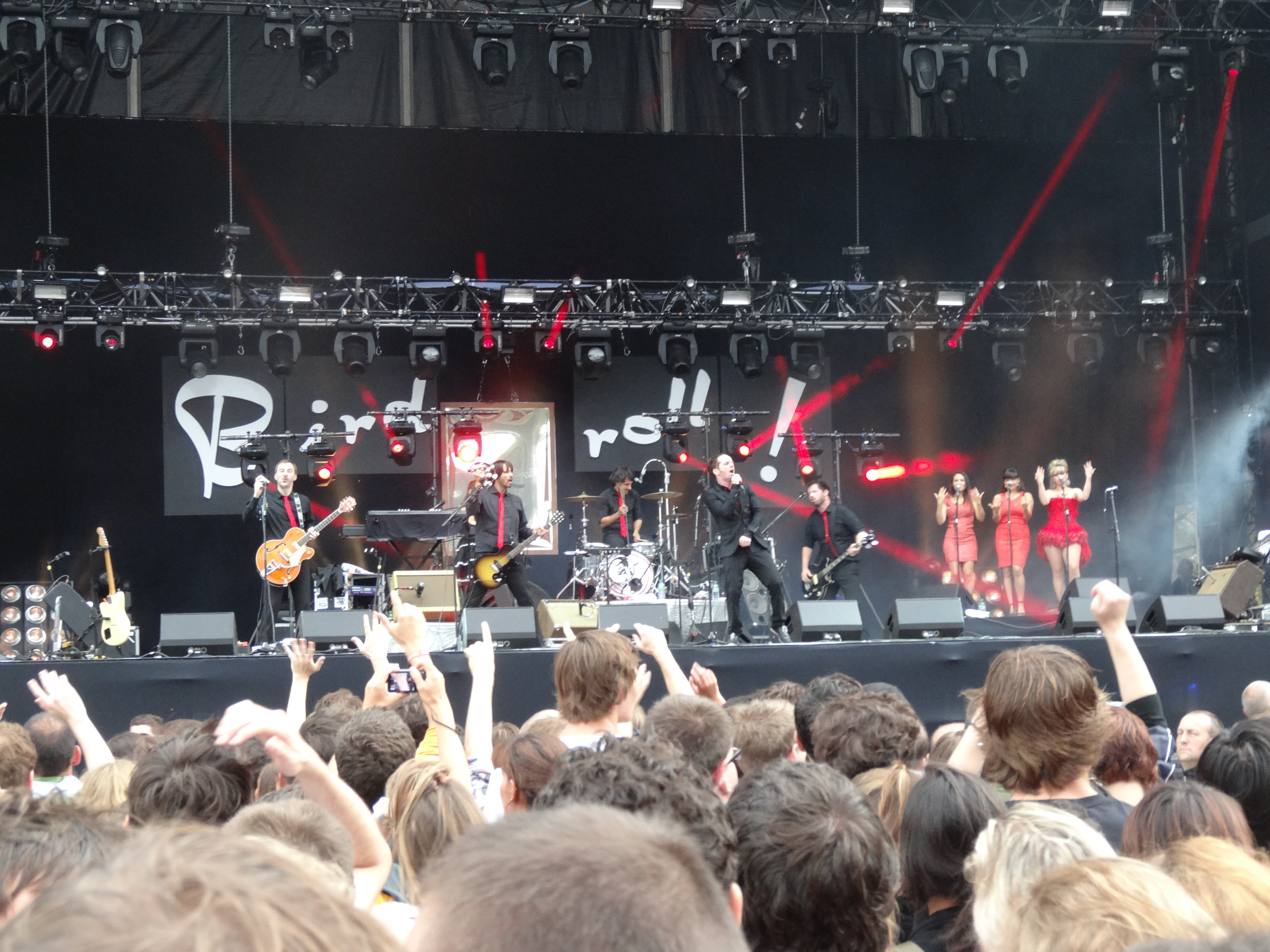
Dionysos at Rock en Seine 2012.

Dionysos is a French pop band that originated in Valence, Drôme, in 1993; their formation took place at their lycée. The group presents songs in both French and English and has produced six studio albums. They are particularly recognized in France for their surrealism and eccentricity.

Their debut album, Happening Songs, was entirely self-produced and featured lyrics exclusively in English. With their subsequent album The sun is blue like eggs in Winter (also self-produced), Babet joined the band in 1997. Then in 1999, they signed a deal with a major label (the now defunct Trema) and released Haïku, which propelled them into the public eye, largely owing to the success of the single "Coccinelle."

The name of the band comes from the ancient Greek god Dionysus, which in French is Dionysos.

== Influences ==
There are evident non-musical influences drawn from Tim Burton and Roald Dahl. Many of the songs carry a surreal quality, with a significant number featuring nonsense lyrics, such as the track "Surfin Frog." The albums Monsters in Love and La mécanique du cœur are situated in a fantastical world teeming with whimsical monsters and other extraordinary characters. This unique setting has been utilized by Mathias Malzieu as the backdrop for two original comic books. The cover art for these comic books, as well as for the two albums, was illustrated by Joann Sfar. Sfar's distinct and comical style of fantasy fiction, as showcased in the Donjon comic books, seamlessly aligns with the band's humor-infused fantasy albums.

The lead singer, Mathias Malzieu, is also working on other projects such as the career of Olivia Ruiz (his partner from 2005 to 2011), and his writing (published 4 books in 2002, 2005, 2007 and 2011). His second book is based on the same world as the album Monsters in Love, and his third book on the same world as the album La mécanique du cœur.

== Members ==
- Mathias Malzieu – vocals, ukulele, folk guitar, theremin, harmonica, glockenspiel

Mathias is the main songwriter and frontman. He has also written three books – 38 mini westerns (Pimientos, 2003), Maintenant qu'il fait tout le temps nuit sur toi (Flammarion, 2005), and La mécanique du cœur (Flammarion, 2007) – with inspiration drawn from the albums and the novels.

- Éric Serra Tosio a.k.a. Rico – drums, percussion, whistle
- Michaël Ponton a.k.a. Miky Biky – lead guitar, phonograph turntable, banjo, lapsteel, ukulele, programming

The Miky Biky co-produced La mécanique du cœur with Mathias.

- Guillaume Garidel a.k.a. Guillermo – bass guitar, contrabass, synthesizer
- Élisabeth Maistre a.k.a. Babet – vocals, violin, keys, banjo, theremin (member since 1998)

Babet has begun a solo career and released three albums: Drôle d'oiseau (5 March 2007), Piano Monstre (27 September 2010) and La promesse (15 June 2023).

- Stéphan Bertholio a.k.a. Stéphano – banjo, keys, bass, glockenspiel, ukulele, baritone guitar, lapsteel, musical saw, melodica (backliner, then official member since 2002)

Stéphan worked as the band's backliner on tour, but joined officially during the recording of Monsters in Love.

== Discography ==
=== Studio albums ===
- Happening Songs (self-produced, 1996)
- The Sun Is Blue Like the Eggs in Winter (self-produced, 1998)
- Haïku (Trema, 1999)
- Western sous la neige (Trema, 2002)
- Monsters in Love (Trema, 2005)
- La Mécanique du Cœur (Barclay, 2007)
- Bird 'n' Roll (Barclay, March 2012)
- Vampire en pyjama (L'Extraordinarium, January 2016)
- Surprisier (L'Extraordinarium, February 2020)

=== Live albums ===
- Whatever the Weather – Concert Électrique (Trema, 2003)
- Whatever the Weather – Concert Acoustique (Trema, 2003)
- Monsters in Live (2007)

=== DVDs ===
- Whatever the Weather (2003) – recorded 30 May 2003 at 'La Laiterie' in Strasbourg
- Monsters in Live (2007) – recorded 28 October 2006 at Le Zénith in Paris with the Synfonietta de Belfort orchestra

=== Other ===
- Yoghurt session (1997) – extremely rare vinyl
- Soon, on your radio (1998) – a CD featuring Dionysos alongside Mary's Child and Despondents
- Old School Recordings (Trema, 15 May 2001) – a collection of rare recordings
- Eats Music (Barclay, 12 October 2009) – another collection of rare recordings, demos and alternative or live versions of previous released tracks
