= Mathias Malzieu =

French musician, writer, and film director

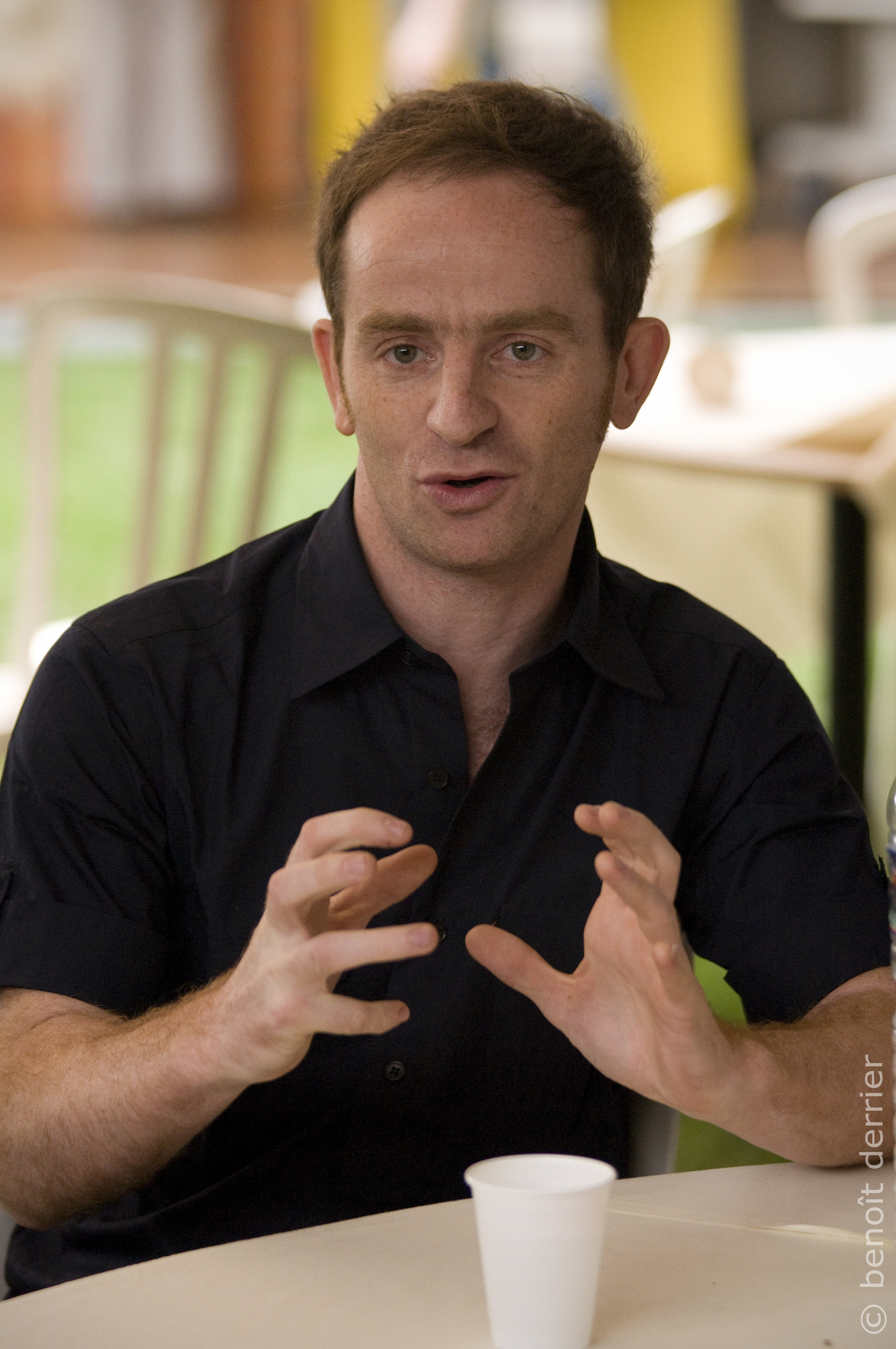
- Conference with Mathias Malzieu at Aux Zarbs festival 2008 (Auxerre, France)
- Born: 16 April 1974 (age 52)
- Other name: Mathias
- Occupations: Musician; Singer; Author; Film director; Scriptwriter
- Years active: 1993–present

Mathias Malzieu (born 1974) is a French singer, co-founder of the band Dionysos, as well as a scriptwriter, film director and writer.

== Music ==
Malzieu is the lead singer of the band Dionysos, which he co-founded in 1993 while living in Valence in Drôme (Auvergne-Rhône-Alpes). Three of his school friends – Eric Serra Tosio, Michael Ponton and Guillaume Garidel – were among the group's original members. For their musical production, they use the following instruments: guitar, ukulele, theremin, harmonica and glockenspiel.

=== With Dionysos band ===
On each album, Mathias Malzieu writes the song lyrics and composes the basic structure of the songs before working on them with the band.

- 1996 : Happening Songs
- 1998 : The Sun Is Blue Like the Eggs in Winter
- 1999 : Haïku
- 2002 : Western sous la neige
- 2005 : Monsters in Love
- 2007 : La Mécanique du cœur
- 2012 : Bird 'n' Roll
- 2016 : Vampire in pyjama
- 2020 : Surprisier

=== Solo Albums ===
- 2015 : Le guerrier de porcelaine
- 2022 : La symphonie du temps qui passe
- 2023 : Ultramour, la grande traversée
- 2025 : L'homme qui écoutait battre le cœur des chats

=== Other solo projects ===
- 2005 : composition of several tracks on the album La Femme Chocolat of Olivia Ruiz singer.
- 2006 : A cover of "Song 2" by Blur with Louise Attaque on the television set of Taratata show.
- 2007 : He plays the ukulele on the song "Petit Homme" from the album Tout n'est plus si noir... of the band Weepers Circus.
- 2008 : L'Espoir of Cali singer, production of part of the album and ukulele accompaniment by Mathias on Je ne te reconnais plus.
- 2008 : Duet with Grand Corps Malade on the stage of TV show Taratata : cover of the song "Les Dalton" by Joe Dassin.
- 2009 : Composition of most of the tracks on the album Miss Météores of Olivia Ruiz.
- 2010 : Cover of "Paint It Black" by the Rolling Stones on the Taratata television set during the Fête de la Musique.
- 2012 : Appearance on the track "Happy End" from Cali's album Vernet-les-Bains.
- 2016 : duo with Aldebert for the song "L'Apprenti Dracula" for the record Enfantillages 3.

== Bibliography ==
Malzieu has written the following books:

- 38 mini westerns avec des fantômes (2002)
- Maintenant qu'il fait tout le temps nuit sur toi (2005)
- La Mécanique du cœur (2007); English translation titled The Boy with the Cuckoo-Clock Heart released in September 2009
- Métamorphose en bord de ciel (2011)
- Le Plus Petit Baiser Jamais Recensé (2013)
- Journal d'un vampire en pyjama (2016); English translation titled Diary of a Vampire in Pyjamas released in May 2017
- Une sirène à Paris
- Le Dérèglement joyeux de la métrique amoureuse

== Filmography ==
=== Director ===
- 2014 : Jack and the Cuckoo-Clock Heart
- 2020 : A Mermaid in Paris
