= Teige =

Teige is a surname. Notable people with the surname include:

- Karel Teige (1900–1951), Czech graphic artist, photographer, and typographer
- Lisa Teige (born 1998), Norwegian actress and dancer
- Thomas Teige (born 1968), German martial artist, multiple world champion and world record holder in powerbreaking, vice world champion in breaking, multiple European champion in kickboxing and occasional actor
