= Thomas Teige =

German martial artist

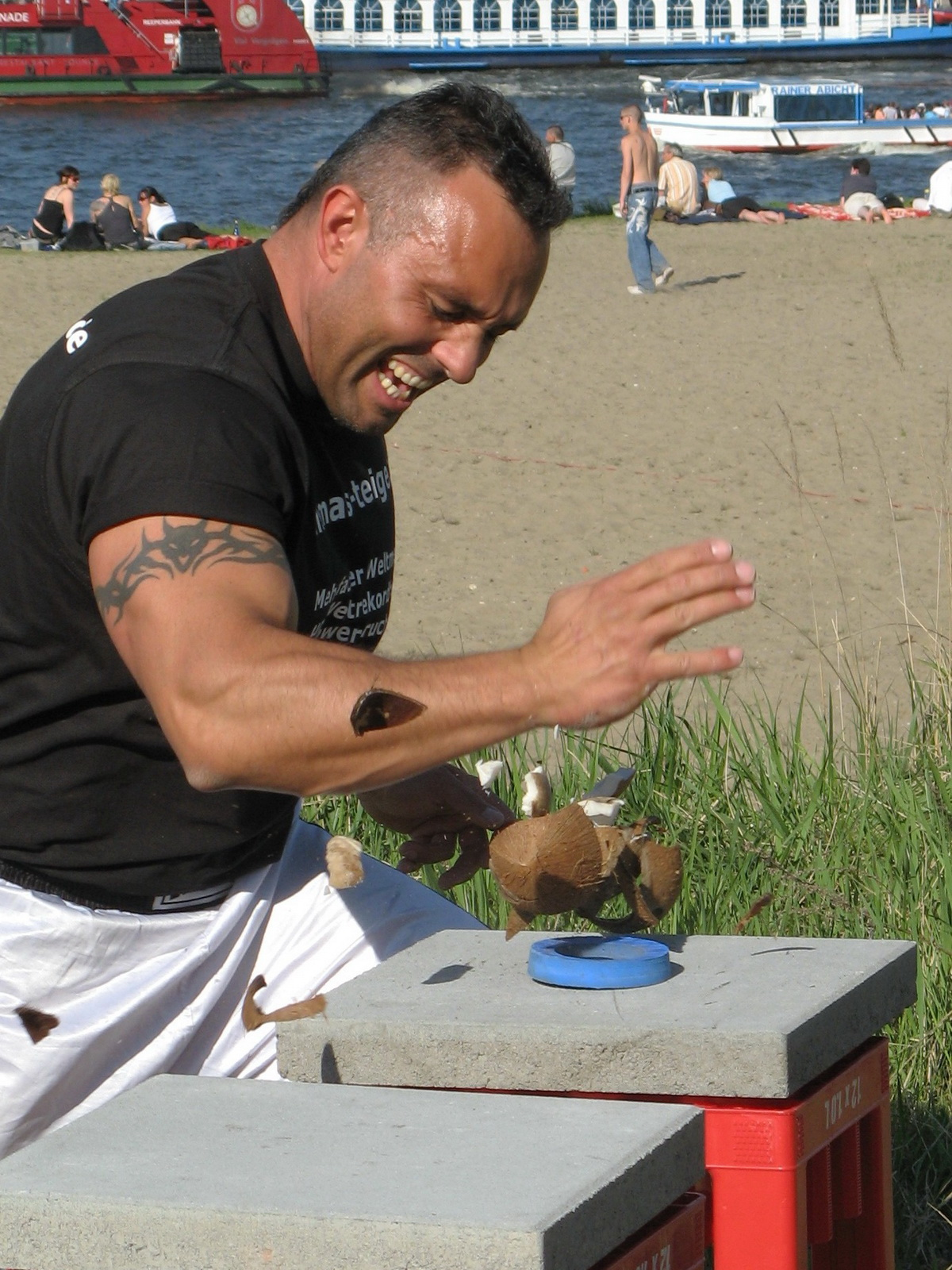
- Born: February 2, 1968 (age 57); Aachen, North Rhine-Westphalia, West Germany
- Other names: The Tiger, Hammerhand
- Height: 1.80 m (5 ft 11 in)
- Weight: 105 kg (231 lb; 16.5 st)
- Style: Kickboxing, Taekwondo
- Rank: 2nd dan black belt in Taekwondo; 1st dan in Judo

Other information
- Notable school(s): Fight-House Hamburg, Hamburg, Germany

Thomas Teige (born February 2, 1968, in Aachen, North Rhine-Westphalia) is a German martial artist.

== Career ==
Thomas Teige was born in Aachen (North Rhine-Westphalia, West Germany) and moved in 1980 to Hamburg, West Germany.

In 1986 at the age of 18 he received black belt in Judo and started training in Taekwondo. He is ranked with the 2nd Dan. Since 1989 he is wearing the black belt.

== Titles ==
In 2006 Thomas Teige was world champion (ETF) in powerbreaking. He broke 8 wooden boards (each 300 mm x 250 mm x 18 mm, not separated by spacers) with his hand at the ETF Euro-Cup 2006 Taekwondo & Martial Arts Championships in Kaltenkirchen (Germany).

On September 23, 2007, he repeats this world record at the ETF World-Cup 2007 in Hollenstedt (Germany).
